= Klaas Twisk =

Dutch racing driver

- Nationality: (Netherlands) Dutch
- Born: 13 July 1930
- Died: 4 March 1999 (aged 68) Wiltshire, England

Klaas Ysbrand "Jimmy" Twisk (13 July 1930 – 4 March 1999) was a Dutch racing driver. He competed in two Formula One non-championship races, the 1959 Silver City Trophy and the 1961 London Trophy, driving a Cooper T51. His best start position was 14th place, and his best result was 16th place.

He also drove in Formula Two and Formula Junior. In September 1960 he won a Formula Two race at Rufforth Circuit.

== Non-championship Formula One results ==
(key)

Year	Entrant	Chassis	Engine	1	2	3	4	5	6	7	8	9	10	11	12	13	14	15	16	17	18	19	20	21
1959	Tulip Stable	Cooper T51	Climax Straight-4	GLV	AIN	INT	OUL	SIL; 16																
1961	Tulip Stable	Cooper T51	Climax Straight-4	LOM	GLV	PAU	BRX	VIE	AIN	SYR	NAP	LON; Ret	SIL	SOL	KAN	DAN	MOD	FLG	OUL	LEW	VAL	RAN	NAT	RSA
