= British Racing Partnership =

British motor racing team and constructor

BRP
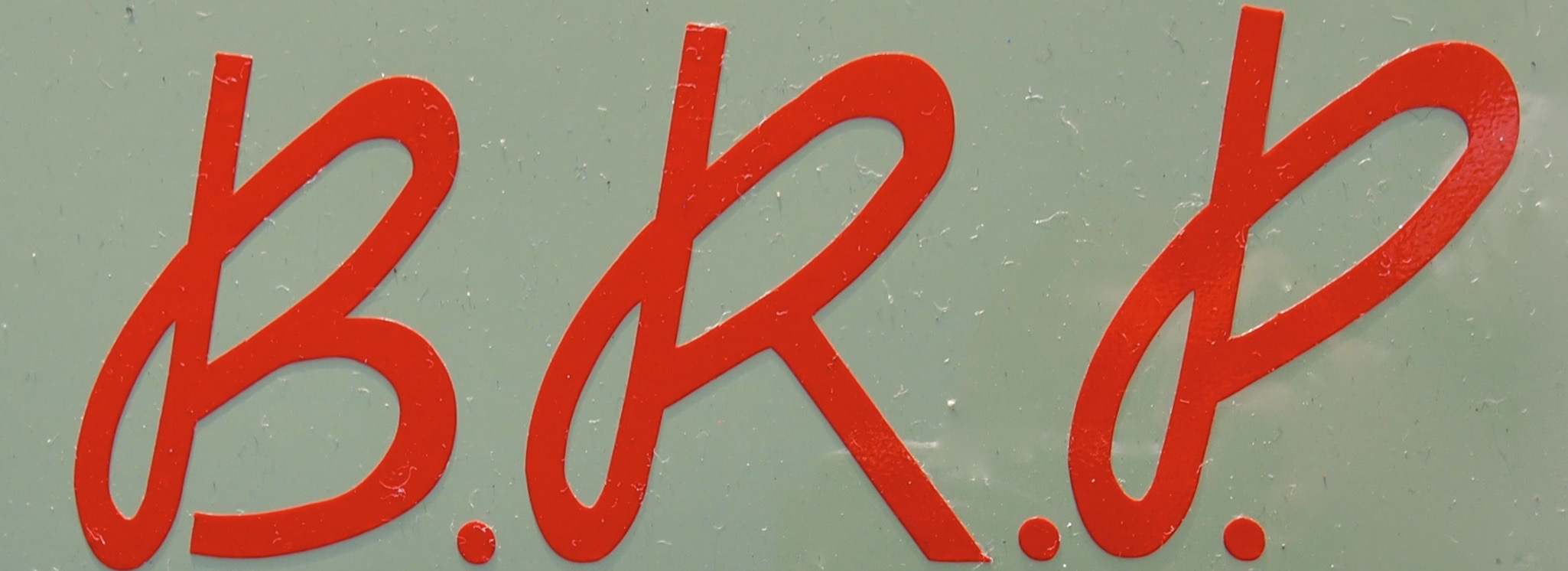
- Full name: British Racing Partnership
- Base: Tring, Hertfordshire, UK
- Founder(s): Alfred Moss; Ken Gregory
- Noted staff: Tony Robinson
- Noted drivers: (United Kingdom) Stirling Moss (United States) Masten Gregory (United Kingdom) Innes Ireland (United Kingdom) Trevor Taylor (United States) Jim Hall

Formula One World Championship career
- First entry: 1958 Moroccan Grand Prix
- Races entered: 43
- Constructors: Cooper, BRM, Lotus, BRP
- Engines: Borgward, BRM, Climax
- Race victories: 0
- Pole positions: 0
- Fastest laps: 2
- Final entry: 1964 Mexican Grand Prix

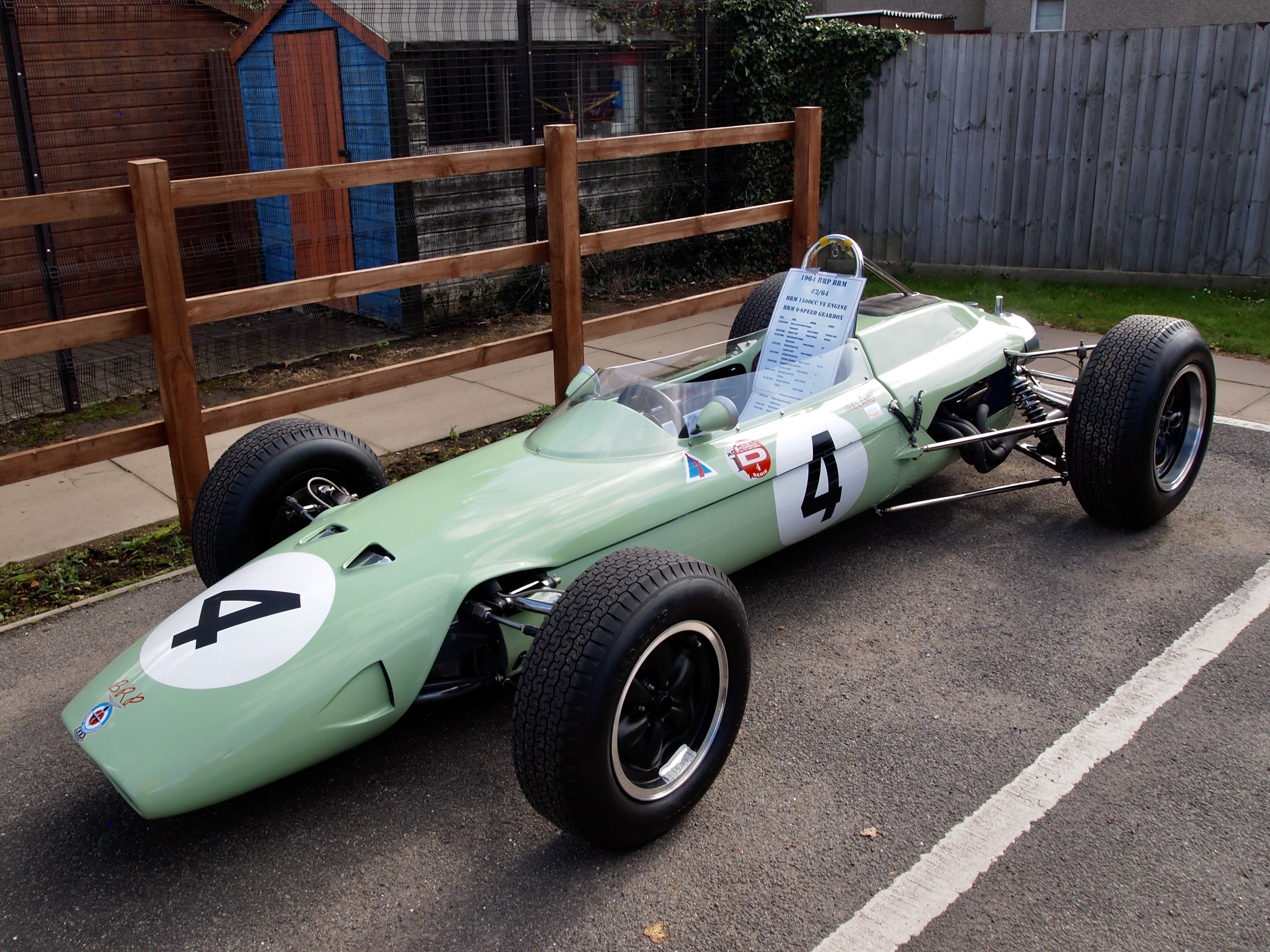
BRP–BRM chassis no. 2-64, BRM Celebration Day, Bourne, Lincolnshire, 2012

(United Kingdom) BRP as a Formula One chassis constructor
Formula One World Championship career
- Engines: BRM
- Entrants: British Racing Partnership
- First entry: 1963 Belgian Grand Prix
- Last entry: 1964 Mexican Grand Prix
- Races entered: 13
- Race victories: 0
- Pole positions: 0
- Fastest laps: 0

British Racing Partnership (BRP) was a racing team, and latterly constructor, from the United Kingdom. It was established by Alfred Moss and Ken Gregory – Stirling Moss's father and former manager, respectively – in 1957 to run cars for Stirling, when not under contract with other firms, along with other up-and-coming drivers.

== History ==
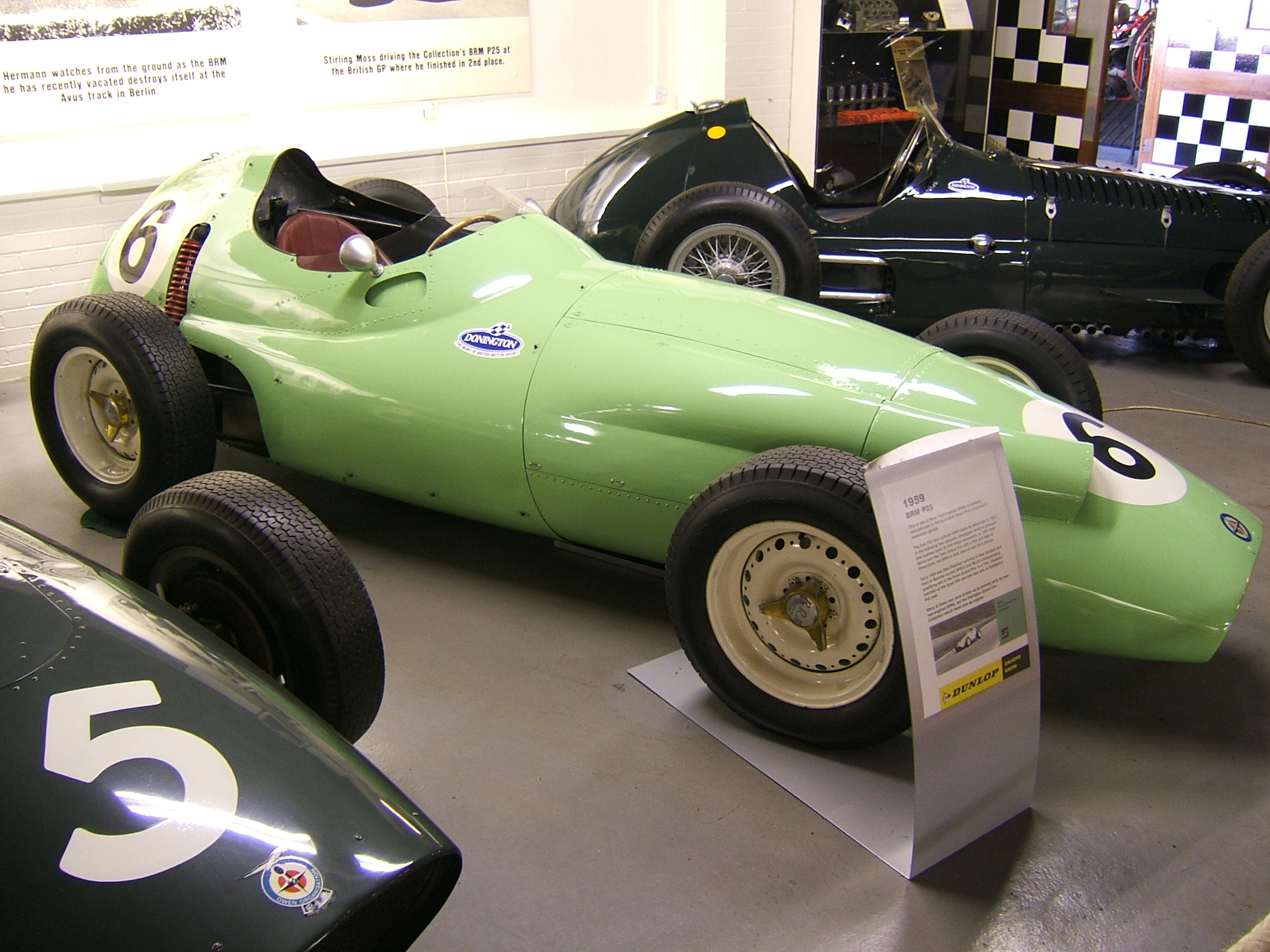
The BRP BRM P25 which Stirling Moss drove to second place in the 1959 British Grand Prix, BRP's best result.

BRP ran a Cooper-Borgward Formula Two car and occasionally a BRM Formula One car in 1959, the latter being demolished in a spectacular crash at the Avus street circuit. BRP was the first Formula One team to sell the entire identity of the team in return for sponsorship income; they were sponsored by the Yeoman Credit Ltd. hire-purchase company from August 1959 and became Yeoman Credit Racing for the 1960 season. BRP was given a sum of £40,000 just to buy their equipment plus £20,000/year to operate the team. The team ran Coopers in both Formula One and Formula Two during 1960, with mixed success. During this time two of the team's drivers were killed while racing their cars, and the Yeoman Credit management became concerned that the team was not generating solely positive publicity for their company. The Yeoman Credit deal was passed to Reg Parnell Racing at the end of the year, and for the 1961 and 1962 seasons BRP was renamed UDT Laystall Racing, as part of a new, similar sponsorship deal. UDT was United Dominions Trust, who among various holdings owned Laystall Engineering, the principal supplier of crankshafts to the British automotive and aviation industries.

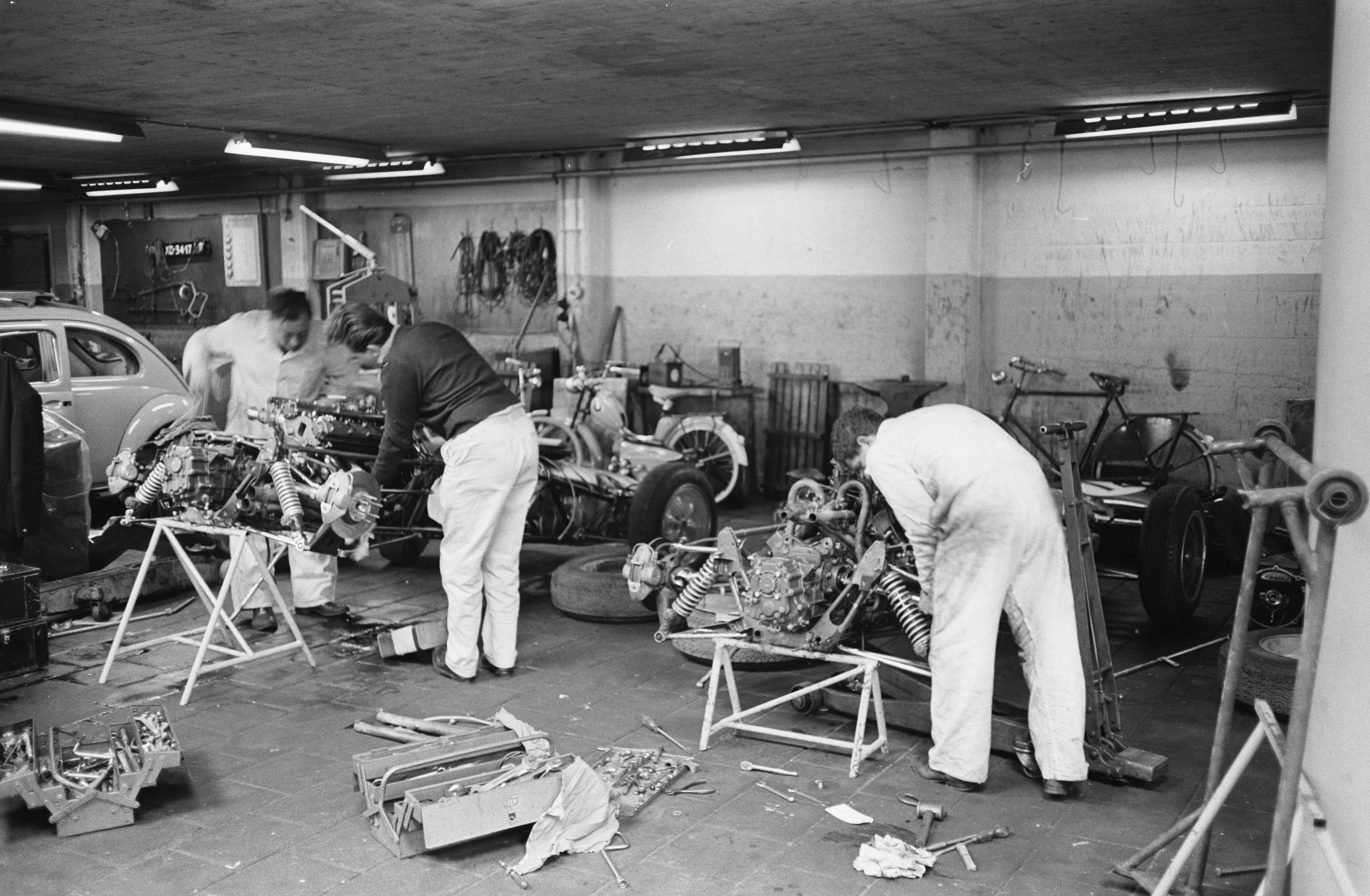
Mechanics work on the UDT Laystall team cars prior to the 1962 Dutch Grand Prix

For 1963, the team reverted to its original name and became a true constructor; they had been running Lotus 24s and Cooper T51s for the previous few seasons, and had tried to acquire the more modern, monocoque Lotus 25 without success. This caused chief designer, Tony Robinson, to design his own monocoque car, patterned very closely after the Lotus 25, but with a thicker skin and running a BRM V8 rather than the typical Coventry Climax engine run in the Lotus 25. This car is commonly referred to as the BRP-BRM and was raced by Innes Ireland and Trevor Taylor.

As a constructor, BRP took part in 13 Grand Prix rounds, scoring a total of 11 championship points. After 1964 the team was forced to withdraw from F1 when BRP were denied membership of the Formula 1 Constructors Association which effectively deprived them of start money, then a significant factor in a team's income. Instead, BRP was hired by Masten Gregory's stepfather George Bryant to build two cars for the 1965 Indianapolis 500, but enjoyed little success.

== Complete Formula One World Championship results ==
=== As a privateer ===
(key)

Year	Entrant	Chassis	Engine	Tyres	Driver	1	2	3	4	5	6	7	8	9	10	11
1958	British Racing Partnership	Cooper T45	Climax FPF 1.5 L4	D		ARG	MON	NED	500	BEL	FRA	GBR	GER	POR	ITA	MOR
1958	British Racing Partnership	Cooper T45	Climax FPF 1.5 L4	D	(United Kingdom) Tom Bridger											Ret
1959	British Racing Partnership					MON	500	NED	FRA	GBR	GER	POR	ITA	USA		
1959	British Racing Partnership	Cooper T51	Climax FPF 1.5 L4	D	(United Kingdom) Ivor Bueb	DNQ										
1959	British Racing Partnership	Cooper T51	Borgward 1500 RS 1.5 L4	D	(United Kingdom) Ivor Bueb					13						
1959	British Racing Partnership	Cooper T51	Borgward 1500 RS 1.5 L4	D	(United Kingdom) Chris Bristow					10						
1959	British Racing Partnership	BRM P25	BRM P25 2.5 L4	D	(United Kingdom) Stirling Moss				DSQ	2						
1959	British Racing Partnership	BRM P25	BRM P25 2.5 L4	D	(West Germany) Hans Herrmann						Ret					
1960	Yeoman Credit Racing Team	Cooper T51	Climax Straight-4	D		ARG	MON	500	NED	BEL	FRA	GBR	POR	ITA	USA	
1960	Yeoman Credit Racing Team	Cooper T51	Climax Straight-4	D	(United Kingdom) Chris Bristow		Ret		Ret	Ret						
1960	Yeoman Credit Racing Team	Cooper T51	Climax Straight-4	D	(United Kingdom) Tony Brooks		4		Ret	Ret		5	5		Ret	
1960	Yeoman Credit Racing Team	Cooper T51	Climax Straight-4	D	(United Kingdom) Henry Taylor				7		4	8	DNS		14	
1960	Yeoman Credit Racing Team	Cooper T51	Climax Straight-4	D	(Belgium) Olivier Gendebien					3	2	9	7		12	
1960	Yeoman Credit Racing Team	Cooper T51	Climax Straight-4	D	(United Kingdom) Bruce Halford						8					
1960	Yeoman Credit Racing Team	Cooper T51	Climax Straight-4	D	(United States) Phil Hill										6	
1961	UDT Laystall Racing Team	Lotus 18; 18/21	Climax FPF 1.5 L4	D		MON	NED	BEL	FRA	GBR	GER	ITA	USA			
1961	UDT Laystall Racing Team	Lotus 18; 18/21	Climax FPF 1.5 L4	D	(United Kingdom) Cliff Allison	8		DNS								
1961	UDT Laystall Racing Team	Lotus 18; 18/21	Climax FPF 1.5 L4	D	(United Kingdom) Henry Taylor	DNQ		DNP	10	Ret		11				
1961	UDT Laystall Racing Team	Lotus 18; 18/21	Climax FPF 1.5 L4	D	(Belgium) Lucien Bianchi				Ret	Ret						
1961	UDT Laystall Racing Team	Lotus 18; 18/21	Climax FPF 1.5 L4	D	(Argentina) Juan Manuel Bordeu				DNS							
1961	UDT Laystall Racing Team	Lotus 18; 18/21	Climax FPF 1.5 L4	D	(United States) Masten Gregory							Ret	Ret			
1962	UDT Laystall Racing Team					NED	MON	BEL	FRA	GBR	GER	ITA	USA	RSA		
1962	UDT Laystall Racing Team	Lotus 24; 18/21	Climax FWMV 1.5 V8; Climax FPF 1.5 L4	D	(United Kingdom) Innes Ireland	Ret	Ret	Ret	Ret	16		Ret	8	5		
1962	UDT Laystall Racing Team	Lotus 24; 18/21	Climax FWMV 1.5 V8; Climax FPF 1.5 L4	D	(United States) Masten Gregory	Ret				7						
1962	UDT Laystall Racing Team	Lotus 24	BRM P56 1.5 V8	D	(United States) Masten Gregory		DNQ	WD	Ret			12	6			
1963	British Racing Partnership	Lotus 24	BRM P56 1.5 V8	D		MON	BEL	NED	FRA	GBR	GER	ITA	USA	MEX	RSA	
1963	British Racing Partnership	Lotus 24	BRM P56 1.5 V8	D	(United States) Jim Hall	Ret	Ret	8	11	6	5	8	10	8		
1963	British Racing Partnership	Lotus 24	BRM P56 1.5 V8	D	(United Kingdom) Innes Ireland	Ret					Ret					
1964	British Racing Partnership	Lotus 24	BRM P56 1.5 V8	D		MON	NED	BEL	FRA	GBR	GER	AUT	ITA	USA	MEX	
1964	British Racing Partnership	Lotus 24	BRM P56 1.5 V8	D	(United Kingdom) Innes Ireland	DNS										
1964	British Racing Partnership	Lotus 24	BRM P56 1.5 V8	D	(United Kingdom) Trevor Taylor					Ret						

=== As a constructor ===
(key)

Year	Entrant	Chassis	Engine(s)	Tyres	Drivers	1	2	3	4	5	6	7	8	9	10	Points	WCC
1963	British Racing Partnership	BRP Mk1	BRM V8	D		MON	BEL	NED	FRA	GBR	GER	ITA	USA	MEX	RSA	6	6th
1963	British Racing Partnership	BRP Mk1	BRM V8	D	(United Kingdom) Innes Ireland		Ret	4	7	Ret		4				6	6th
1964	British Racing Partnership	BRP Mk1; BRP Mk2	BRM V8	D		MON	NED	BEL	FRA	GBR	GER	AUT	ITA	USA	MEX	5	7th
1964	British Racing Partnership	BRP Mk1; BRP Mk2	BRM V8	D	(United Kingdom) Innes Ireland			10	Ret	10		5	5	Ret	12	5	7th
1964	British Racing Partnership	BRP Mk1; BRP Mk2	BRM V8	D	(United Kingdom) Trevor Taylor	Ret		7	Ret			Ret	DNQ	6	Ret	5	7th

=== Non-championship F1 results ===
Year	Entrant	Chassis	Engine(s)	Drivers	1	2	3	4	5	6	7	8	9	10	11	12	13	14	15	16	17	18	19	20	21
1958	British Racing Partnership	Cooper T45	Climax L4	(United Kingdom) Tom Bridger	BUE	GLV; Ret	SYR	AIN	INT	CAE															
1958	British Racing Partnership	Cooper T45	Climax L4	(United Kingdom) Stuart Lewis-Evans	BUE	GLV	SYR	AIN; 5	INT; 7																
1958	British Racing Partnership	Cooper T43	Climax L4	(United Kingdom) Stuart Lewis-Evans						CAE; 5															
1959	British Racing Partnership	Cooper T51	Borgward 1500 RS 1.5 L4	(United Kingdom) Ivor Bueb	BUE	GLV	AIN; Ret	INT; 8	OUL	SIL															
1959	British Racing Partnership	Cooper T51	Borgward 1500 RS 1.5 L4	(United Kingdom) George Wicken	BUE	GLV	AIN; 8	INT	OUL	SIL															
1959	British Racing Partnership	Cooper T51	Borgward 1500 RS 1.5 L4	(United Kingdom) Chris Bristow						SIL; 5															
1959	British Racing Partnership	Cooper T51	Climax L4	(United Kingdom) Chris Bristow	BUE	GLV	AIN	INT	OUL; 3																
1960	Yeoman Credit Racing Team	Cooper T51	Climax L4	(United States) Harry Schell	BUE; 5	GLV; Ret	INT; DNS†	SIL	LOM	OUL															
1960	Yeoman Credit Racing Team	Cooper T51	Climax L4	(United Kingdom) Chris Bristow	BUE	GLV; 3	INT; DNS	SIL	LOM	OUL															
1960	Yeoman Credit Racing Team	Cooper T51	Climax L4	(United Kingdom) Henry Taylor	BUE	GLV	INT	SIL; 5	LOM; Ret	OUL; 7															
1960	Yeoman Credit Racing Team	Cooper T51	Climax L4	(United States) Dan Gurney	BUE	GLV	INT	SIL; 7	LOM	OUL															
1960	Yeoman Credit Racing Team	Cooper T51	Climax L4	(United Kingdom) Bruce Halford	BUE	GLV	INT	SIL; 8	LOM	OUL; 8															
1960	Yeoman Credit Racing Team	Cooper T51	Climax L4	(United Kingdom) Tony Brooks	BUE	GLV	INT	SIL; Ret	LOM	OUL															
1960	Yeoman Credit Racing Team	Cooper T51	Climax L4	(New Zealand) Denis Hulme	BUE	GLV	INT	SIL	LOM; 5	OUL															
1961	UDT-Laystall Racing Team	Lotus 18/21	Climax FPF 1.5 L4	(United Kingdom) Cliff Allison	LOM; 2	GLV; 8	PAU	BRX; 5	VIE	AIN; 15	SYR; WD	NAP	LON; 8	SIL; WD	SOL	KAN	DAN	MOD	FLG	OUL	LEW	VAL	RAN	NAT	RSA
1961	UDT-Laystall Racing Team	Lotus 18/21	Climax FPF 1.5 L4	(United Kingdom) Henry Taylor	LOM; 4	GLV; 6	PAU	BRX; Ret	VIE	AIN; Ret	SYR; WD	NAP	LON; 2	SIL; 8	SOL	KAN	DAN; 4	MOD; Ret	FLG	OUL; 8	LEW	VAL	RAN	NAT	RSA
1961	UDT-Laystall Racing Team	Lotus 18/21	Climax FPF 1.5 L4	(United Kingdom) Stirling Moss	LOM	GLV	PAU	BRX	VIE	AIN	SYR	NAP	LON	SIL; 1	SOL; Ret	KAN; 1	DAN; 1	MOD	FLG	OUL	LEW	VAL	RAN	NAT; 2	RSA; 2
1961	UDT-Laystall Racing Team	Lotus 18/21	Climax FPF 1.5 L4	(Sweden) Jo Bonnier	LOM	GLV	PAU	BRX	VIE	AIN	SYR	NAP	LON	SIL; 11	SOL	KAN	DAN	MOD	FLG	OUL	LEW	VAL	RAN	NAT	RSA
1961	UDT-Laystall Racing Team	Lotus 18/21	Climax FPF 1.5 L4	(Sweden) Carl Hammarlund	LOM	GLV	PAU	BRX	VIE	AIN	SYR	NAP	LON	SIL	SOL	KAN; Ret	DAN	MOD	FLG	OUL	LEW	VAL	RAN	NAT	RSA
1961	UDT-Laystall Racing Team	Lotus 18/21	Climax FPF 1.5 L4	(United States) Masten Gregory	LOM	GLV	PAU	BRX	VIE	AIN	SYR	NAP	LON	SIL	SOL	KAN	DAN; Ret	MOD; NC	FLG	OUL; 5	LEW	VAL	RAN; Ret	NAT; Ret	RSA; Ret
1962	UDT-Laystall Racing Team	Lotus 18/21	Climax FPF 1.5 L4	(United States) Masten Gregory	CAP; 4	BRX; Ret	LOM; Ret	LAV	GLV; 5	PAU	AIN; Ret			MAL; 5	CLP										
1962	UDT-Laystall Racing Team	Lotus 24	Climax FWMV 1.5 V8	(United States) Masten Gregory								INT; 8	NAP												
1962	UDT-Laystall Racing Team	Lotus 24	BRM P56 1.5 V8	(United States) Masten Gregory												RMS; Ret	SOL; DNA	KAN; 1	MED	DAN; 2	OUL; 6	MEX; 5	RAN	NAT	
1962	UDT-Laystall Racing Team	Lotus 18/21	Climax V8	(United Kingdom) Innes Ireland	CAP	BRX; 3	LOM; Ret	LAV	GLV; 3	PAU	AIN; Ret														
1962	UDT-Laystall Racing Team	Ferrari 156	Climax V8	(United Kingdom) Innes Ireland								INT; 4													
1962	UDT-Laystall Racing Team	Lotus 24	Climax V8	(United Kingdom) Innes Ireland									NAP	MAL	CLP; 1	RMS; 3	SOL; DNA	KAN; 4	MED	DAN; 3	OUL	MEX; 3	RAN; Ret	NAT	
1962	UDT-Laystall Racing Team	Lotus 18/21	Climax V8	(United Kingdom) Stirling Moss	CAP	BRX	LOM; 7	LAV	GLV; Ret	PAU	AIN	INT	NAP	MAL	CLP	RMS	SOL	KAN	MED	DAN	OUL	MEX	RAN	NAT	
1963	British Racing Partnership	Lotus 24	BRM V8	(United Kingdom) Innes Ireland	LOM; 3	GLV; 1	PAU	IMO	SYR	AIN; 2	INT; 4	ROM		KAN	MED	AUT	OUL; 13	RAN							
1963	British Racing Partnership	BRP Mk1	BRM V8	(United Kingdom) Innes Ireland									SOL; 3												
1963	British Racing Partnership	Lotus 24	BRM V8	(United States) Jim Hall	LOM; 6	GLV; 4	PAU	IMO	SYR	AIN; Ret	INT; Ret	ROM	SOL; 6	KAN	MED	AUT	OUL	RAN							
1963	British Racing Partnership	Lotus 24	BRM V8	(United Kingdom) Mike Beckwith	LOM	GLV	PAU	IMO	SYR	AIN	INT	ROM	SOL	KAN	MED	AUT	OUL; Ret	RAN							
1964	British Racing Partnership	BRP Mk1	BRM V8	(United Kingdom) Innes Ireland	DMT; 1	NWT; Ret	SYR	AIN; Ret	INT; 12	SOL; Ret	MED; 3	RAN													
1964	British Racing Partnership	BRP Mk1	BRM V8	(United Kingdom) Trevor Taylor				AIN; Ret	INT; Ret	SOL	MED; Ret	RAN													
1964	British Racing Partnership	Lotus 24	BRM V8	(United Kingdom) Trevor Taylor	DMT; Ret	NWT; 3	SYR			SOL; 6															
1966	Stirling Moss Racing Team	BRP Mk2	BRM V8	(United States) Richie Ginther	RSA; Ret	SYR	INT	OUL																	
1966	John Willment Automobiles	BRP	Climax V8	(United Kingdom) John Campbell-Jones	RSA	SYR	INT	OUL; DSQ																	

== Sources ==
- Forix article on BRP
- Team Profile at Grand Prix Encyclopedia
- F1 Database entry
- Results from Formula1.com
