= Gerry Ashmore =

British racing driver (1936–2021)

- Born: 25 July 1936; West Bromwich, Staffordshire, England, U.K.
- Died: 25 August 2021 (aged 85); Leamington Spa, Warwickshire, England

Formula One World Championship career
- Nationality: (United Kingdom) British
- Active years: 1961–1962
- Team: non-works Lotus
- Entries: 4 (3 starts)
- Championships: 0
- Wins: 0
- Podiums: 0
- Career points: 0
- Pole positions: 0
- Fastest laps: 0
- First entry: 1961 British Grand Prix
- Last entry: 1962 Italian Grand Prix

Joseph Frederick Harold Gerald "Gerry" Ashmore (25 July 1936 – 25 August 2021) was a British motor racing driver from England. He participated in four Formula One World Championship Grands Prix, scoring no championship points.

== Life ==
Ashmore started his career in Formula Junior along with his brother Chris, in 1960. His father Joe and uncle Fred were both racing drivers, Fred having taken part in a handful of Grands Prix. Later that year, he competed at Zeltweg and Innsbruck, finishing third behind Hans Herrmann and Wolfgang von Trips. In 1961 he moved up to Formula One with a privately run Lotus 18, and scored a second place in the Naples Grand Prix after taking pole position. Later that year, he took part in the British Grand Prix but retired after just a few laps. His last appearance in a World Championship event was in his Lotus in 1962 at Monza, when he failed to qualify.

Ashmore died from cancer in August 2021 at the age of 85.

== Complete Formula One World Championship results ==
(key)

Year	Entrant	Chassis	Engine	1	2	3	4	5	6	7	8	9	WDC	Points
1961	Gerry Ashmore	Lotus 18	Climax Straight-4	MON	NED	BEL	FRA	GBR; Ret	GER; 16	ITA; Ret	USA		NC	0
1962	Gerry Ashmore	Lotus 18/21	Climax Straight-4	NED	MON	BEL	FRA	GBR	GER	ITA; DNQ	USA	RSA	NC	0

=== Non-championship ===
(key) (Races in bold indicate pole position)

Year	Entrant	Chassis	Engine	1	2	3	4	5	6	7	8	9	10	11	12	13	14	15	16	17	18	19	20	21
1961	Tim Parnell	Lotus 18	Climax Str-4	LOM	GLV	PAU	BRX	VIE; Ret	AIN; 11	SYR	**NAP**; 2	LON	SIL	SOL	KAN	DAN	MOD	FLG	OUL					
1961	Gerry Ashmore	Lotus 18	Climax Str-4																	LEW; DNA	VAL	RAN	NAT	RSA
1962	Gerry Ashmore	Lotus 18/21	Climax Str-4	CAP	BRX	LOM	LAV; Ret	GLV; 9	PAU	AIN										OUL; 8	MEX	RAN	NAT	
1962	Derek Wilkinson	BRM P48/57	BRM V8								INT; DNA	NAP	MAL	CLP	RMS	SOL	KAN	MED	DAN					
