= Chris Bristow =

British racing driver (1937–1960)

- Born: 2 December 1937; Lambeth, London, England, UK
- Died: 19 June 1960 (aged 22); Circuit de Spa-Francorchamps, Liège, Belgium

Formula One World Championship career
- Nationality: (United Kingdom) British
- Active years: 1959–1960
- Team: non-works Cooper
- Entries: 4
- Championships: 0
- Wins: 0
- Podiums: 0
- Career points: 0
- Pole positions: 0
- Fastest laps: 0
- First entry: 1959 British Grand Prix
- Last entry: 1960 Belgian Grand Prix

Christopher William Bristow (2 December 1937 – 19 June 1960) was a British Formula One driver. Bristow was called the "wild man of British club racing", as he had spun or had collisions on almost every racetrack on which he had raced. He started four Formula One World Championship races and scored no championship points.

== Career ==
In his first Grand Prix in a Formula One car, the 1960 Monaco Grand Prix, Bristow recorded a joint-third qualifying time, although he was given the fourth starting spot. He retired on lap 17 due to gearbox issues. Bristow then out-qualified his British Racing Partnership team-mates at the Dutch GP, starting in 7th place, although he was forced to retire again in the opening laps due to an engine issue.

== Death ==
Bristow was killed during the 1960 Belgian Grand Prix at the very fast Spa-Francorchamps circuit, in warm, dry, sunny conditions. Bristow wrecked his Yeoman Credit Racing Cooper T51 at the Burnenville corner on lap twenty while fighting to stay in front of the Ferrari of Willy Mairesse. At 22, Bristow was the youngest-ever driver to die in a Formula One World Championship event.

Bristow and Alan Stacey died in close proximity and within a few minutes of one another. They both crashed at Burnenville, the same extended fast right-hand bend at which Stirling Moss had been severely injured the previous day. Cars regularly sped through the Burnenville corner at 120 miles per hour. There was a four-foot embankment there and barbed wire in the meadow about ten feet back from the road. Bristow's Cooper hit the bank and rolled over; he was hurled into the barbed wire, which decapitated him. As the crash occurred on the inside of the corner, his body continued back onto the track, where it sat for the rest of the Grand Prix. His and Stacey's accidents would cause many drivers, including future two-time World Champion Jim Clark, to develop a life-long dislike of the track.

With regard to Bristow's unruly driving style, a friend of his said after the accident, "We all knew this was going to happen. It does no good to say now, but Chris simply did not have the experience to drive that way in Grand Prix racing."

=== Legacy ===
Several decades after his death, British Racing Partnership team-boss Ken Gregory called Bristow "the early Schumacher of his day", saying "he [almost certainly] would have been a potential world champion". However, former team-mate and mentor Stirling Moss called this statement "extremely over-generous", saying Bristow was "probably like a Jean Alesi, if as quick".

The winner of the annual Autosport BRDC Award for promising young British drivers is also presented with the Chris Bristow Trophy.

== Complete Formula One World Championship results ==
(key)

Yr	Entrant	Chassis	Engine	1	2	3	4	5	6	7	8	9	10	WDC	Points
1959	British Racing Partnership	Cooper T51 (F2)	Borgward Straight-4	MON	500	NED	FRA	GBR; 10	GER	POR	ITA	USA		NC	0
1960	Yeoman Credit Racing Team	Cooper T51	Climax Straight-4	ARG	MON; Ret	500	NED; Ret	BEL; Ret	FRA	GBR	POR	ITA	USA	NC	0

=== Non-championship results ===
(key) (Races in bold indicate pole position) (Races in italics indicate fastest lap)

Year	Entrant	Chassis	Engine	1	2	3	4	5	6
1959	British Racing Partnership	Cooper T51	Climax Straight-4	BUE	GLV	AIN	INT	OUL; 3	SIL
1960	Yeoman Credit Racing Team	Cooper T51	Climax Straight-4	BUE	**GLV**; **3**	INT; DNA	SIL	LOM	OUL

Preceded by Harry Schell	Formula One fatal accidents 19 June 1960	Succeeded by Alan Stacey
