= Neville Lederle =

South African racing driver (1938–2019)

- Born: 25 September 1938; Theunissen, Winburg, Orange Free State, South Africa
- Died: 17 May 2019 (aged 80); Knysna, Western Cape Province, South Africa

Formula One World Championship career
- Nationality: (South Africa) South African
- Active years: 1962, 1965
- Team: non-works Lotus
- Entries: 2 (1 start)
- Championships: 0
- Wins: 0
- Podiums: 0
- Career points: 1
- Pole positions: 0
- Fastest laps: 0
- First entry: 1962 South African Grand Prix
- Last entry: 1965 South African Grand Prix

Neville Lederle (25 September 1938 – 17 May 2019) was a racing driver from South Africa, and the 1963 South African Drivers Champion. He participated in two World Championship Formula One Grands Prix, scoring a single championship point.

== Early life ==
Lederle was born in Theunissen, Orange Free State and schooled at St Andrews in Bloemfontein.

== Formula One career ==
Starting out in Formula One with his Ford-engined Lotus 18 in 1961, Lederle retired from the Rand Grand Prix and only managed 14th in the Cape Grand Prix in January 1962. Later that year, however, he acquired a Lotus 21 with a Climax engine and came fifth in the 1962 Rand Grand Prix and fourth in the Natal Grand Prix. This form led him to a sixth place in the World Championship South African Grand Prix and thus a World Championship point in his first event at that level.

In 1963, Lederle broke a leg in practice for the Rand 9 Hours sports car race and missed a large part of the 1964 season whilst recovering. He returned with his Lotus 21 for the end-of-season 1964 Rand Grand Prix where he finished 10th, but he narrowly failed to qualify for January's 1965 South African Grand Prix. After this disappointment, Lederle effectively retired from racing to concentrate on business interests, which included a Volkswagen dealership.

== Death ==
Lederle died at his home in Knysna on 17 May 2019.

== Complete Formula One World Championship results ==
(key)

Year	Entrant	Chassis	Engine	1	2	3	4	5	6	7	8	9	10	WDC	Points
1962	Neville Lederle	Lotus 21	Climax Straight-4	NED	MON	BEL	FRA	GBR	GER	ITA	USA	RSA; 6		18th	1
1963	Neville Lederle	Lotus 21	Climax Straight-4	MON	BEL	NED	FRA	GBR	GER	ITA	USA	MEX	RSA; DNA	NC	0
1965	Scuderia Scribante	Lotus 21	Climax Straight-4	RSA; DNQ	MON	BEL	FRA	GBR	NED	GER	ITA	USA	MEX	NC	0

=== Non-Championship ===
(key)

Year	Entrant	Chassis	Engine	1	2	3	4	5	6	7	8	9	10	11	12	13	14	15	16	17	18	19	20	21
1961	Neville Lederle	Lotus 18	Ford Straight-4	LOM	GLV	PAU	BRX	VIE	AIN	SYR	NAP	LON	SIL	SOL	KAN	DAN	MOD	FLG	OUL	LEW	VAL	RAN; DNA	NAT; Ret	RSA
1962	Neville Lederle	Lotus 18	Ford Straight-4	CAP; 14	BRX	LOM	LAV	GLV	PAU	AIN	INT	NAP	MAL	CLP	RMS	SOL	KAN	MED	DAN	OUL	MEX			
1962	Neville Lederle	Lotus 21	Climax Straight-4																			RAN; 5	NAT; 4	
1964	Scuderia Scribante	Lotus 21	Climax Straight-4	DMT	NWT	SYR	AIN	INT	SOL	MED	RAN; 10													

Sporting positions
Preceded by Ernest Pieterse	South African Formula One Championship; Champion; 1963	Succeeded by John Love
