= Ernie Pieterse =

South African racing driver (1938–2017)

- Born: 4 July 1938; Parow, Cape Town, South Africa
- Died: 1 November 2017 (aged 79); Johannesburg, South Africa

Formula One World Championship career
- Nationality: (South Africa) South African
- Active years: 1962–1963, 1965
- Team: non-works Lotus
- Entries: 3 (2 starts)
- Championships: 0
- Wins: 0
- Podiums: 0
- Career points: 0
- Pole positions: 0
- Fastest laps: 0
- First entry: 1962 South African Grand Prix
- Last entry: 1965 South African Grand Prix

Ernest Pieterse (4 July 1938 – 1 November 2017) was a racing driver from South Africa. He participated in three Formula One World Championship Grands Prix, debuting on 29 December 1962, but scored no championship points. He was the 1962 South African Drivers Champion.

== Complete Formula One World Championship results ==
(key)

Year	Entrant	Chassis	Engine	1	2	3	4	5	6	7	8	9	10	WDC	Points
1962	Ernest Pieterse	Lotus 21	Climax Straight-4	NED	MON	BEL	FRA	GBR	GER	ITA	USA	RSA; 10		NC	0
1963	Lawson Organisation	Lotus 21	Climax Straight-4	MON	BEL	NED	FRA	GBR	GER	ITA	USA	MEX	RSA; Ret	NC	0
1965	Lawson Organisation	Lotus 21	Climax Straight-4	RSA; DNQ	MON	BEL	FRA	GBR	NED	GER	ITA	USA	MEX	NC	0

=== Non-Championship ===
(key)

Year	Entrant	Chassis	Engine	1	2	3	4	5	6	7	8	9	10	11	12	13	14	15	16	17	18	19	20	21
1961	Scuderia Alfa	Heron	Alfa Romeo Str-4	LOM	GLV	PAU	BRX	VIE	AIN	SYR	NAP	LON	SIL	SOL	KAN	DAN	MOD	FLG	OUL	LEW	VAL	RAN; 6	NAT; Ret	RSA; Ret
1962	Scuderia Alfa	Heron	Alfa Romeo Str-4	CAP; 8	BRX	LOM	LAV	GLV	PAU	AIN	INT	NAP	MAL	CLP	RMS	SOL	KAN	MED	DAN	OUL	MEX			
1962	Ernest Pieterse	Lotus 21	Climax Str-4																			RAN; 11	NAT; 5	
1963	Lawson Organisation	Lotus 21	Climax Str-4	LOM	GLV	PAU	IMO	SYR	AIN	INT	ROM	SOL	KAN	MED	AUT	OUL	RAN; 5							
1964	Ernest Pieterse	Lotus 21	Climax Str-4	DMT	NWT	SYR	AIN	INT	SOL	MED	RAN; Ret													

Sporting positions
Preceded by Syd van der Vyver	South African Formula One Championship; Champion; 1962	Succeeded by Neville Lederle
