= Syd van der Vyver =

South African racing driver

- Born: 1 June 1920
- Died: 20 August 1989 (aged 69); Pennington, Natal, South Africa

Formula One World Championship career
- Nationality: (South Africa) South African
- Active years: 1962
- Team: privateer Lotus
- Entries: 1 (0 starts)
- Championships: 0
- Wins: 0
- Podiums: 0
- Career points: 0
- Pole positions: 0
- Fastest laps: 0
- First entry: 1962 South African Grand Prix

Syd van der Vyver (1 June 1920 – 20 August 1989) was a racing driver from South Africa, who won the South African Drivers Championship in 1960 and 1961.

== Career ==
After starting his motor sport career in speedway, van der Vyver switched to cars in the early 1950s, participating in both circuit racing and hillclimbing. He found success quickly, and by the end of the decade had established himself as one of the top drivers in the country. As well as winning the national championship twice in the early 1960s, he performed well in Formula One races against the top drivers in the world in the well-attended Rand Grand Prix, Natal Grand Prix and South African Grand Prix, finishing in the top 10 in all three races in 1961.

He had entered the World Championship 1962 South African Grand Prix, but had to withdraw after rolling and seriously damaging his new Lotus 24 the previous week in the 1962 Natal Grand Prix. This was his only entry to a World Championship Grand Prix. With the car repaired, he raced and won again in local events, but did not compete again in Formula One. After this car was destroyed in a fire, van der Vyver retired from the sport.

== Results ==
=== Complete Formula One World Championship results ===
(key)

Year	Entrant	Chassis	Engine	1	2	3	4	5	6	7	8	9	WDC	Points
1962	Syd van der Vyver	Lotus 24	Climax V8	NED	MON	BEL	FRA	GBR	GER	ITA	USA	RSA; DNA	NC	0

=== Non-Championship Formula One results ===
(key)

Year	Entrant	Chassis	Engine	1	2	3	4	5	6	7	8	9	10	11	12	13	14	15	16	17	18	19	20	21
1961	Syd van der Vyver	Lotus 18	Alfa Romeo L4	LOM	GLV	PAU	BRX	VIE	AIN	SYR	NAP	LON	SIL	SOL	KAN	DAN	MOD	FLG	OUL	LEW	VAL	RAN; 7	NAT; 5	RSA; 6
1962	Syd van der Vyver	Lotus 18	Alfa Romeo L4	CAP; 7	BRX	LOM	LAV	GLV	PAU	AIN	INT	NAP	MAL	CLP	RMS	SOL	KAN	MED	DAN	OUL	MEX			
1962	Syd van der Vyver	Lotus 24	Climax V8																			RAN; Ret	NAT; Ret	
