= 1959 Silver City Trophy =

- Non-championship race in the 1959 Formula One season

Race details
- Date: 10 October 1959
- Official name: IV Silver City Trophy
- Location: Snetterton Circuit, Norfolk
- Course: Permanent racing facility
- Course length: 4.36 km (2.71 miles)
- Distance: 25 laps, 109.03 km (67.75 miles)

Pole position
Driver	(United Kingdom) Ron Flockhart	BRM
- Time: 1:34.8

Fastest lap
Driver	(United Kingdom) Ron Flockhart	BRM
- Time: 1:33.6

Podium
First	(United Kingdom) Ron Flockhart	BRM
Second	(Australia) Jack Brabham	Cooper-Climax
Third	(United Kingdom) Bruce Halford	BRM

The 4th Silver City Trophy was a motor race, run to Formula One rules, held on 10 October 1959 at Snetterton Circuit, Norfolk. The race was run over 25 laps of the circuit, and was won by British driver Ron Flockhart in a BRM P25. Flockhart also took pole and fastest lap.

There were also several Formula Two entries in the field. Chris Bristow was highest-placed in that category, driving a Cooper T51, and fifth overall.

== Results ==
Note: a blue background indicates a car running under Formula 2 regulations.

Pos	No.	Driver	Entrant	Constructor	Time/Retired	Grid
1	2	(United Kingdom) Ron Flockhart	Owen Racing Organisation	BRM P25	39m 49.2s	1
2	1	(Australia) Jack Brabham	Cooper Car Company	Cooper T51-Climax	25 laps	6
3	3	(United Kingdom) Bruce Halford	Owen Racing Organisation	BRM P25	25 laps	4
4	6	(United Kingdom) David Piper	Dorchester Service Station	Lotus 16-Climax	24 laps	7
5	12	(United Kingdom) Chris Bristow	British Racing Partnership	Cooper T51-Borgward	24 laps	8
6	24	(United Kingdom) Mike McKee	Jim Russell	Cooper T45-Climax	24 laps	10
7	8	(United Kingdom) Ian Raby	Ian Raby Racing	Hume Cooper-Climax	23 laps	9
8	26	(United Kingdom) John Campbell-Jones	John Campbell-Jones	Cooper T45-Climax	23 laps	12
9	18	(United Kingdom) Trevor Taylor	Ace Garage Rotherham	Cooper T51-Climax	23 laps	15
10	9	(United Kingdom) Chris Summers	Equipe Arden	Cooper T51-Climax	22 laps	16
11	22	(Belgium) Andre Pilette	Ecurie Nationale Belge	Cooper T51-Climax	22 laps	17
12	25	(United Kingdom) Mike Parkes	David Fry	Fry-Climax	22 laps	18
13	21	(United Kingdom) Tim Parnell	Reg Parnell Racing	Cooper T45-Climax	22 laps	20
14	19	(United Kingdom) Dick Gibson	Dick Gibson	Cooper T43-Climax	22 laps	21
15	14	(United Kingdom) Ron Carter	Trentside Motor Co	Cooper T45-Climax	20 laps	22
16	15	(Netherlands) Klaas Twisk	Tulip Stable	Cooper T51-Climax	20 laps	23
Ret	27	(United Kingdom) Stan Hart	Oliver Hart	Cooper T43-Climax	18 laps - mechanical	11
Ret	4	(United Kingdom) Innes Ireland	Team Lotus	Lotus 16-Climax	15 laps - anti-roll bar	5
Ret	10	(United Kingdom) Roy Salvadori	High Efficiency Motors	Cooper T45-Maserati	11 laps - mechanical	2
Ret	5	(United Kingdom) Graham Hill	Team Lotus	Lotus 16-Climax	9 laps - drive shaft/steering	3
Ret	16	(United Kingdom) Brian Whitehouse	Westmount Garage	Cooper T43-Climax	2 laps - ignition	13
Ret	20	(United Kingdom) Keith Greene	Gilby Engineering	Cooper T43-Climax	2 laps - suspension	14
DNS	23	(Belgium) Lucien Bianchi	Ecurie Nationale Belge	Cooper T51-Climax	Mechanical	19
DNA	7	(United Kingdom) Bruce Halford	Horace Gould	Maserati 250F	Drove entry #3	-
DNA	11	(United Kingdom) Dennis Taylor	Dennis Taylor	Lotus 12-Climax		-
DNA	17	(United Kingdom) George Wicken	Wincheap Racing Association	Cooper T43-Climax		-

Previous race: 1959 International Gold Cup	Formula One non-championship races 1959 season	Next race: 1960 Glover Trophy
Previous race: 1958 Silver City Trophy	Silver City Trophy	Next race: 1960 Silver City Trophy
