= 1960 BRDC International Trophy =

- Non-championship race in the 1960 Formula One season
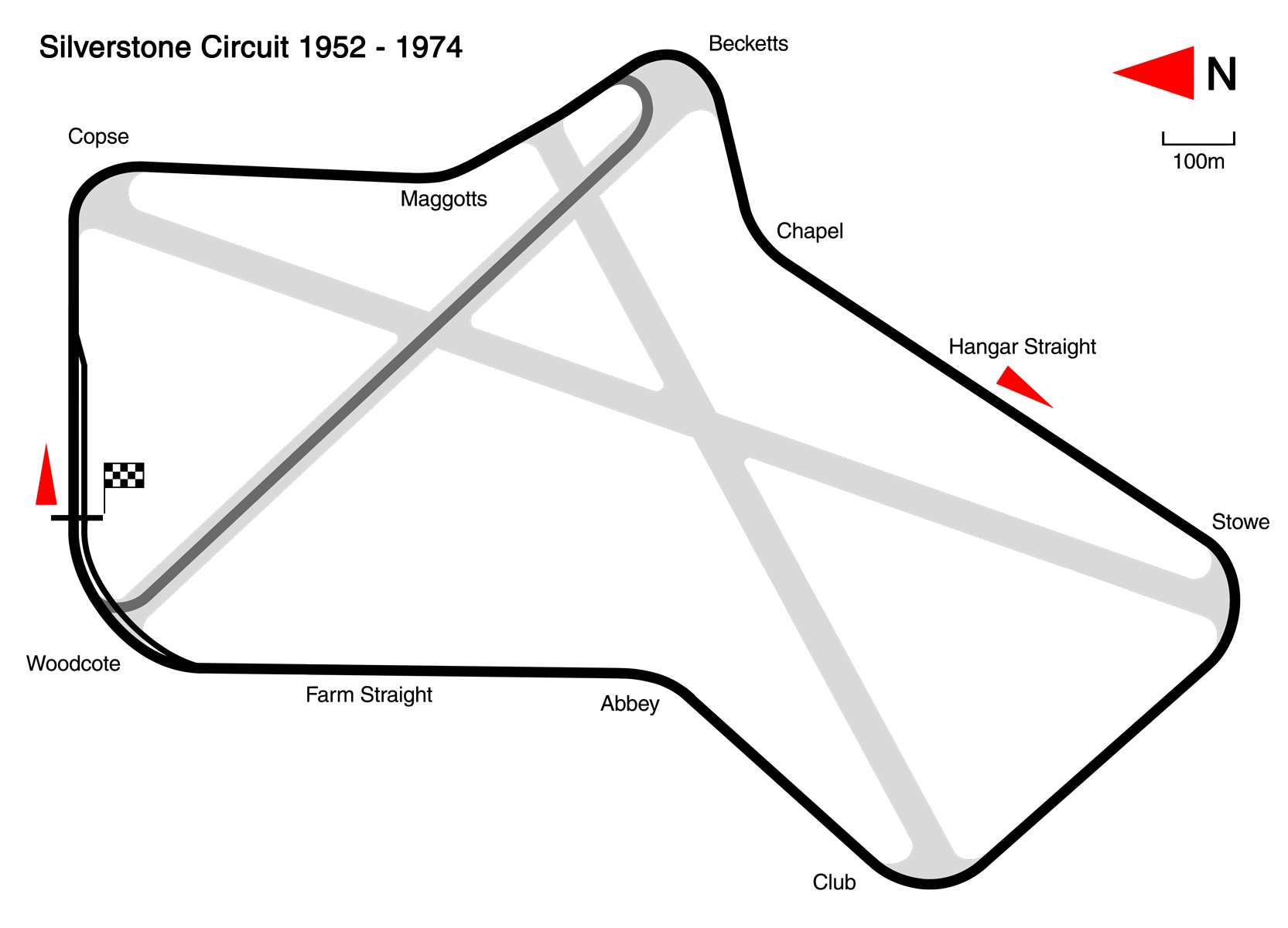

Race details
- Date: 14 May 1960
- Official name: XII BRDC International Trophy
- Location: Silverstone Circuit, Northamptonshire
- Course: Permanent racing facility
- Course length: 4.714 km (2.93 miles)
- Distance: 50 laps, 235.7 km (146.5 miles)
- Weather: Practice: wet Race: dry, sunny, windy

Pole position
Driver	(United Kingdom) Stirling Moss	Lotus-Climax
- Time: 1:50.4

Fastest lap
Driver	(United Kingdom) Innes Ireland	Lotus-Climax
- Time: 1:34.2

Podium
First	(United Kingdom) Innes Ireland	Lotus-Climax
Second	(Australia) Jack Brabham	Cooper-Climax
Third	(United Kingdom) Graham Hill	BRM

The 12th BRDC International Trophy was a motor race, run to Formula One rules, held on 14 May 1960 at the Silverstone Circuit, England. The race was run over 50 laps of the Silverstone Grand Prix circuit, and was won by British driver Innes Ireland in a Lotus 18. The race was marred by the death of experienced American driver Harry Schell in a violent accident during practice in wet conditions.

The field also included several Formula Two cars. They were the Coopers of Denis Hulme, Tony Marsh, John Campbell-Jones, Tim Parnell and Chris Bristow.

== Results ==
Pos	No.	Driver	Entrant	Constructor	Time/Retired	Grid
1	10	(United Kingdom) Innes Ireland	Team Lotus	Lotus-Climax	1.20:41.1	11
2	1	(Australia) Jack Brabham	Cooper Car Company	Cooper-Climax	+ 1.9 s	5
3	4	(United Kingdom) Graham Hill	Owen Racing Organisation	BRM	+ 1:10.6 s	8
4	11	(United Kingdom) Alan Stacey	Team Lotus	Lotus-Climax	49 laps	9
5	25	(United States) Phil Hill	Scuderia Ferrari	Ferrari	49 laps	4
6	9	(United States) Masten Gregory	Scuderia Centro Sud	Cooper-Maserati	48 laps	12
7	23	(United Kingdom) Jack Fairman	C.T. Atkins / High Efficiency Motors	Cooper-Climax	48 laps	13
8	24	(United Kingdom) Cliff Allison	Scuderia Ferrari	Ferrari	47 laps	7
9	8	(United Kingdom) Ian Burgess	Scuderia Centro Sud	Cooper-Maserati	46 laps	18
10	7	(France) Maurice Trintignant	David Brown Corporation	Aston Martin	46 laps	14
11	15	(United Kingdom) Brian Naylor	JBW Car Co.	JBW-Maserati	46 laps	25
12	29	(New Zealand) Denis Hulme	New Zealand International Grand Prix Team	Cooper-Climax (F2)	46 laps	21
13	17	(United Kingdom) Keith Greene	Gilby Engineering	Cooper-Maserati	46 laps	16
14	2	(New Zealand) Bruce McLaren	Cooper Car Company	Cooper-Climax	45 laps	15
15	31	(United Kingdom) Tony Marsh	Tony Marsh	Cooper-Climax (F2)	Fuel line	19
16	30	(United Kingdom) John Campbell-Jones	DRW Engineering Ltd	Cooper-Climax (F2)	Clutch	23
Ret	5	(Sweden) Jo Bonnier	Owen Racing Organisation	BRM	Brakes / overheating	2
Ret	16	(United Kingdom) Bruce Halford	Fred Tuck Cars	Cooper-Climax	Brakes	20
Ret	20	(United Kingdom) Stirling Moss	Rob Walker Racing Team	Cooper-Climax	Wishbone	1
NC	19	(United Kingdom) Mike Taylor	Taylor & Crawley Racing	Lotus-Climax	32 laps	24
Ret	18	(United Kingdom) David Piper	Robert Bodle Ltd	Lotus-Climax	Clutch	17
Ret	28	(United Kingdom) Tim Parnell	R.H.H. Parnell	Cooper-Climax (F2)	Overheating	22
Ret	12	(United Kingdom) John Surtees	Team Lotus	Lotus-Climax	Oil leak	6
Ret	3	(United States) Dan Gurney	Owen Racing Organisation	BRM	Engine	3
Ret	6	(United Kingdom) Roy Salvadori	David Brown Corporation	Aston Martin	Misfire	10
DNS	22	(United States) Harry Schell	Yeoman Credit Racing Team	Cooper-Climax	Fatal accident in practice	–
DNS	27	(United Kingdom) Chris Bristow	Yeoman Credit Racing Team	Cooper-Climax (F2)	Withdrawn	–
DNS	12	(United Kingdom) Jim Clark	Team Lotus	Lotus-Climax	Car driven by Surtees	–
DNA	26	(United Kingdom) Tony Brooks	Vandervell Products	Vanwall	Car not ready	–
DNA	8	(Argentina) Carlos Menditeguy	Scuderia Centro Sud	Cooper-Maserati	Car driven by Burgess	–
DNA	14	(United Kingdom) Ron Flockhart	Alan Brown Equipe	Cooper-Climax	Car not ready	–
DNA	21	(United Kingdom) Ken Gregory	Rob Walker Racing Team	Cooper-Climax	Car driven by Moss	–

=== Other cars ===
- Stirling Moss also practised in a different Cooper-Climax (car #20T) but it was damaged in an accident. He subsequently practised and raced Ken Gregory's car.
- John Surtees also practised in a privately entered Formula Two Cooper-Climax (car #32) but did not race it. He may also have been entered for the race in a Vanwall, but this is not confirmed.

Previous race: 1960 Glover Trophy	Formula One non-championship races 1960 season	Next race: 1960 Silver City Trophy
Previous race: 1959 BRDC International Trophy	BRDC International Trophy	Next race: 1961 BRDC International Trophy
