= 1962 Cape Grand Prix =

- Non-championship race in the 1962 Formula One season

Race details
- Date: 2 January 1962
- Official name: V Cape Grand Prix
- Location: Killarney Circuit, Cape Town
- Course: Permanent racing facility
- Course length: 3.312 km (2.058 miles)
- Distance: 60 laps, 198.71 km (123.47 miles)

Pole position
Driver	(United Kingdom) Jim Clark	Lotus-Climax
- Time: 1:28.4

Fastest lap
Driver	(United Kingdom) Jim Clark	Lotus-Climax
- Time: 1:29.1

Podium
First	(United Kingdom) Trevor Taylor	Lotus-Climax
Second	(United Kingdom) Jim Clark	Lotus-Climax
Third	(Sweden) Jo Bonnier	Porsche

The 5th Cape Grand Prix was a motor race, run to South African Formula One-style rules, held on 2 January 1962 at Killarney Motor Racing Complex, Cape Town, South Africa. The race was run over 60 laps of the circuit, and was won by British driver Trevor Taylor, in his Lotus 21.

There were no great differences between the local rules to which this race was run and the international Formula One rules, but for example sports car bodies were permitted, such as the Porsche special driven by Jennings.

The race was dominated by Taylor and Jim Clark, and they swapped the lead several times during the race, after Jo Bonnier had led for the first three laps. After Clark spun, Taylor was able to keep the lead for the last ten laps to take the victory.

Local driver Vic Proctor's homebuilt car with its Alfa Romeo engine was deemed unraceworthy by the race organisers, and was excluded before Proctor set a time in practice.

== Results ==
Pos	No.	Driver	Entrant	Constructor	Time/Retired	Grid
1	2	(United Kingdom) Trevor Taylor	Team Lotus	Lotus-Climax	1.30:54.0	2
2	1	(United Kingdom) Jim Clark	Team Lotus	Lotus-Climax	+ 0.6 s	1
3	5	(Sweden) Jo Bonnier	Porsche System Engineering	Porsche	+ 6.6 s	3
4	6	(United States) Masten Gregory	UDT Laystall Racing Team	Lotus-Climax	+ 38.6 s	4
5	8	(South Africa) Tony Maggs	Yeoman Credit Racing Team	Cooper-Climax	+ 42.0 s	6
6	4	(Germany) Edgar Barth	Porsche System Engineering	Porsche	59 laps	5
7	3	(South Africa) Syd van der Vyver	Syd van der Vyver	Lotus-Alfa Romeo	58 laps	8
8	7	(South Africa) Ernie Pieterse	Scuderia Alfa	Heron-Alfa Romeo	58 laps	9
9	21	(Federation of Rhodesia and Nyasaland) John Love	A.H. Pillman	LDS-Porsche	58 laps	6
10	16	(South Africa) Helmut Menzler	Ecurie Wolman	Lotus-Borgward	57 laps	11
11	22	(South Africa) Bob van Niekerk	Ted Lanfear	Lotus-Ford	56 laps	12
12	20	(South Africa) Fanie Viljoen	G.E. Mennie	LDS-Climax	55 laps	13
13	24	(South Africa) Bernard Podmore	Bernard Podmore	Lotus-Ford	54 laps	16
14	10	(South Africa) Neville Lederle	Neville Lederle	Lotus-Ford	48 laps	15
Ret	19	(South Africa) Bruce Jennings	Bill Jennings	Jennings-Porsche	Valve gear	19
Ret	23	(South Africa) Adrian Pheiffer	Adrian Pheiffer	Cooper-Alfa Romeo	Stub axle	10
Ret	18	(South Africa) Clive Trundell	Clive Trundell	Cooper-Climax	Engine	17
Ret	25	(South Africa) John Guthrie	Ecurie Rhodes	Cooper-Alfa Romeo	Engine	18
Ret	15	(Federation of Rhodesia and Nyasaland) Sam Tingle	Sam Tingle	LDS-Alfa Romeo	Engine	14
EX	17	(South Africa) Vic Proctor	Vic Proctor	Vic-Alfa Romeo		-
WD	9	(South Africa) Bruce Johnstone	Yeoman Credit Racing Team	Cooper-Climax	Car damaged	-
WD	11	(South Africa) Doug Serrurier	Scuderia Alfa	LDS-Alfa Romeo		-
WD	12	(South Africa) Doug Serrurier	Scuderia Lupini	Cooper-Maserati		-
WD	14	(South Africa) Don Philp	Don Philp	Quodra-Climax	Car not ready	-

Previous race: 1961 South African Grand Prix	Formula One non-championship races 1962 season	Next race: 1962 Brussels Grand Prix
Previous race: 1960 Cape Grand Prix	Cape Grand Prix	Next race: 1965 Cape Grand Prix
