= 1959 International Gold Cup =

- Non-championship race in the 1959 Formula One season

Race details
- Date: 26 September 1959
- Official name: VI International Gold Cup
- Location: Oulton Park Circuit, Cheshire
- Course: Permanent racing facility
- Course length: 4.44 km (2.76 miles)
- Distance: 55 laps, 244.41 km (151.86 miles)

Pole position
Driver	(United Kingdom) Stirling Moss	Cooper-Climax
- Time: 1:42.4

Fastest lap
Driver	(United Kingdom) Stirling Moss	Cooper-Climax
- Time: 1:41.8

Podium
First	(United Kingdom) Stirling Moss	Cooper-Climax
Second	(Australia) Jack Brabham	Cooper-Climax
Third	(United Kingdom) Chris Bristow	Cooper-Climax

The 6th International Gold Cup was a motor race, run to Formula One rules, held on 26 September 1959 at the Oulton Park Circuit, Cheshire. The race was run over 55 laps of the circuit, and was won by British driver Stirling Moss in a Cooper T51.

== Results ==
Pos	No.	Driver	Entrant	Constructor	Time/Retired	Grid
1	7	(United Kingdom) Stirling Moss	Rob Walker Racing	Cooper T51-Climax	1h34m37.2, 154.97 km/h	1
2	3	(Australia) Jack Brabham	Cooper Car Company	Cooper T51-Climax	1h34m42.4, +5.2s	2
3	2	(United Kingdom) Chris Bristow	British Racing Partnership	Cooper T51-Climax	1h36m14.8, +1m37.6s	3
4	4	(United Kingdom) Roy Salvadori	High Efficiency Motors	Cooper T45-Maserati	53 laps	6
5	1	(United Kingdom) Graham Hill	Team Lotus	Lotus 16-Climax	52 laps	4
6	18	(United Kingdom) Tony Marsh	Tony Marsh	Cooper T45-Climax	51 laps	7
7	17	(United Kingdom) Stan Hart	Oliver Hart	Cooper T43-Climax	49 laps	10
8	8	(United Kingdom) David Piper	Dorchester Service Station	Lotus 16-Climax	48 laps	8
9	16	(United Kingdom) Paul Emery	Emeryson Cars	Cooper T43-Alta	46 laps	13
Ret	19	(United Kingdom) Ian Raby	Ian Raby Racing	Cooper T43-Climax	22 laps - mechanical	11
Ret	6	(New Zealand) Bruce McLaren	Cooper Car Company	Cooper T51-Climax	9 laps - gearbox	5
Ret	11	(United Kingdom) Arthur Owen	Arthur Owen	Cooper T51-Climax	1 lap - spin	12
Ret	12	(United Kingdom) John Brown	John Brown	AFM-BMW	1 lap - mechanical	14
DNS	9	(United Kingdom) Bruce Halford	Horace Gould	Maserati 250F	Mechanical	9
DNS	14	(United Kingdom) Brian Naylor	JB Naylor	JBW-Maserati	Crash	-
DNS	15	(United Kingdom) Henry Taylor	United Racing Stable	Cooper T51-Climax	Mechanical	-
DNA	5	(United Kingdom) Brian Whitehouse	Brian Whitehouse	Cooper T43-Climax	Car not ready	-
DNA	10	(Sweden) Jo Bonnier	Owen Racing Organisation	BRM P25	Car not ready	-

Previous race: 1959 BRDC International Trophy	Formula One non-championship races 1959 season	Next race: 1959 Silver City Trophy
Previous race: 1958 International Gold Cup	International Gold Cup	Next race: 1960 International Gold Cup
