= 1959 BARC Aintree 200 =

1959 BARC "200"
- Non-championship race in the 1959 Formula One season

Race details
- Date: 18 April 1959
- Official name: XIV BARC "200"
- Location: Aintree Circuit, Merseyside
- Course: Permanent racing facility
- Course length: 4.83 km (3.00 miles)
- Distance: 67 laps, 323.61 km (201.00 miles)

Pole position
Driver	(United States) Masten Gregory	Cooper-Climax
- Time: 1:59.6

Fastest lap
Driver	(United Kingdom) Stirling Moss	Cooper-BRM
- Time: 1:58.8

Podium
First	(France) Jean Behra	Ferrari
Second	(United Kingdom) Tony Brooks	Ferrari
Third	(New Zealand) Bruce McLaren	Cooper-Climax

The 14th BARC "200" was a motor race, run to Formula One rules, held on 18 April 1959 at the Aintree Circuit, England. The race was run over 67 laps of the circuit, and was won by French driver Jean Behra in a Ferrari Dino 246.

The field also included many Formula Two cars, highest finisher being Mike Taylor who took fifth place in a Cooper T45.

== Results ==
Note: a blue background indicates a car running under Formula 2 regulations.

Pos	No.	Driver	Entrant	Constructor	Time/Retired	Grid
1	2	(France) Jean Behra	Scuderia Ferrari	Ferrari Dino 246	2h15m52.0s, 142.86 km/h	2
2	1	(United Kingdom) Tony Brooks	Scuderia Ferrari	Ferrari Dino 246	2h16m2.4s, +10.4s	8
3	12	(New Zealand) Bruce McLaren	Cooper Car Company	Cooper T45-Climax	2h17m45.8s, +1m53.8s	11
4	5	(Brazil) Hermano da Silva Ramos	Scuderia Centro Sud	Maserati 250F	63 laps	15
5	24	(United Kingdom) Mike Taylor	Equipe Alan Brown	Cooper T45-Climax	63 laps	12
6	28	(United Kingdom) Keith Greene	Gilby Engineering	Cooper T43-Climax	63 laps	13
7	30	(United Kingdom) Jackie Lewis	H&L Motors	Cooper T45-Climax	63 laps	20
8	22	(United Kingdom) George Wicken	British Racing Partnership	Cooper T51-Borgward	63 laps	25
9	31	(United Kingdom) Brian Naylor	JB Naylor	Cooper T45-Climax	62 laps	26
10	35	(United Kingdom) Henry Taylor	Tim Parnell	Cooper T45-Climax	62 laps	14
11	16	(United Kingdom) Graham Hill	Team Lotus	Lotus 16-Climax	61 laps	28
12	33	(United Kingdom) Dennis Taylor	Dennis Taylor	Lotus 12-Climax	60 laps	18
13	32	(United Kingdom) Trevor Taylor	Ace Garage Rotherham	Cooper T51-Climax	59 laps	22
14	27	(United Kingdom) Tony Marsh	Tony Marsh	Cooper T45-Climax	57 laps	17
15	4	(United States) Dale Duncan	Scuderia Centro Sud	Maserati 250F	57 laps	27
16	34	(United Kingdom) John Campbell-Jones	Cornwall Garage	Cooper T43-Climax		23
Ret	23	(United Kingdom) Ivor Bueb	British Racing Partnership	Cooper T51-Climax	50 laps - gearbox	10
Ret	29	(United Kingdom) Jack Fairman	High Efficiency Motors	Cooper T43-Climax	42 laps - gearbox	19
Ret	25	(United Kingdom) Peter Ashdown	Equipe Alan Brown	Cooper T45-Climax	38 laps - gearbox	16
Ret	21	(United Kingdom) Bruce Halford	John Fisher	Lotus 16-Climax	36 laps -	29
Ret	8	(France) Maurice Trintignant	Rob Walker Racing	Cooper T51-Borgward	34 laps – fuel pump	21
Ret	7	(United Kingdom) Stirling Moss	Rob Walker Racing	Cooper T45-BRM	30 laps - gearbox	6
Ret	20	(United Kingdom) David Piper	Dorchester Service Station	Lotus 16-Climax	29 laps - gearbox	24
Ret	14	(United States) Harry Schell	Owen Racing Organisation	BRM P25	28 laps - engine	3
Ret	11	(United States) Masten Gregory	Cooper Car Company	Cooper T51-Climax	19 laps - clutch	1
Ret	10	(Australia) Jack Brabham	Cooper Car Company	Cooper T51-Climax	18 laps – gasket	5
Ret	26	(United Kingdom) Jim Russell	Jim Russell	Cooper T45-Climax	12 laps - clutch	9
Ret	9	(United Kingdom) Roy Salvadori	High Efficiency Motors	Cooper T45-Maserati	10 laps - gearbox	7
Ret	15	(Sweden) Jo Bonnier	Owen Racing Organisation	BRM P25	2 laps – con-rod	4
DNA	3	(Italy) Giorgio Scarlatti	Scuderia Ugolini	Maserati 250F	entry withdrawn	-
DNA	6	(Australia) Ken Kavanagh	Ken Kavanagh	Maserati 250F	entry withdrawn	-
DNA	17	(United States) Pete Lovely	Team Lotus	Lotus 16-Climax	car not ready	-
DNA	18	(United Kingdom) Alan Stacey	Team Lotus	Lotus 16-Climax	no car available	-
DNA	19	(United Kingdom) Innes Ireland	Team Lotus	Lotus 16-Climax	no car available	-

Previous race: 1959 Glover Trophy	Formula One non-championship races 1959 season	Next race: 1959 BRDC International Trophy
Previous race: 1958 BARC Aintree 200	BARC 200	Next race: 1961 BARC "200"
