= 1961 Natal Grand Prix =

- Non-championship race in the 1961 Formula One season

Race details
- Date: 17 December 1961
- Official name: I Natal Grand Prix
- Location: Westmead Circuit, Durban
- Course: Permanent racing facility
- Course length: 3.62 km (2.2496 miles)
- Distance: 89 laps, 322.213 km (200.214 miles)

Pole position
Driver	(United Kingdom) Jim Clark	Lotus-Climax
- Time: 1:26.1

Fastest lap
Driver	(United Kingdom) Stirling Moss	Lotus-Climax
- Time: 1:24.8

Podium
First	(United Kingdom) Jim Clark	Lotus-Climax
Second	(United Kingdom) Stirling Moss	Lotus-Climax
Third	(Sweden) Jo Bonnier	Porsche

The 1st Natal Grand Prix was a motor race, run to South African Formula One-style rules, held on 17 December 1961 at Westmead Circuit, South Africa. The race was run over 89 laps of the circuit, and was won by British driver Jim Clark, in his Lotus 21.

There were no great differences between the local rules to which this race was run and the international Formula One rules, but for example sports car bodies were permitted, such as the Porsche special driven by Jennings.

Clark led the race from start to finish, with only Stirling Moss, who had started from the back of the grid, able to stay on the same lap by the end. The local South African entrants were outclassed, with the first of them finishing three laps down on Clark.

== Results ==
Pos	No.	Driver	Entrant	Constructor	Time/Retired	Grid
1	8	(United Kingdom) Jim Clark	Team Lotus	Lotus-Climax	2.13:58.4	1
2	7	(United Kingdom) Stirling Moss	UDT Laystall Racing Team	Lotus-Climax	+ 31.9 s	22
3	4	(Sweden) Jo Bonnier	Porsche System Engineering	Porsche	88 laps	2
4	5	(Germany) Edgar Barth	Porsche System Engineering	Porsche	87 laps	8
5	1	(South Africa) Syd van der Vyver	Syd van der Vyver	Lotus-Alfa Romeo	86 laps	7
6	11	(South Africa) Doug Serrurier	Scuderia Lupini	Cooper-Maserati	86 laps	10
7	25	(South Africa) Adrian Pheiffer	Adrian Pheiffer	Cooper-Alfa Romeo	86 laps	9
8	26	(South Africa) Trevor Blokdyk	Trevor Blokdyk	Cooper-Ford		19
9	19	(South Africa) Bruce Jennings	Bill Jennings	Jennings-Porsche		18
10	20	(South Africa) John Guthrie	Ecurie Rhodes	Cooper-Alfa Romeo		13
Ret	2	(South Africa) Bruce Johnstone	Yeoman Credit Racing Team	Cooper-Climax	Accident	6
Ret	14	(South Africa) Don Philp	Don Philp	Quodra-Climax	Engine	12
Ret	16	(South Africa) Helmut Menzler	Ecurie Wolman	Lotus-Borgward		14
Ret	29	(South Africa) Neville Lederle	Neville Lederle	Lotus-Ford		15
Ret	27	(South Africa) Bob van Niekerk	Equipe Judette	Lotus-Ford		16
Ret	10	(South Africa) Ernie Pieterse	Scuderia Alfa	Heron-Alfa Romeo	Suspension	11
Ret	23	(South Africa) Fanie Viljoen	G.E. Mennie	LDS-Climax		17
Ret	15	(Federation of Rhodesia and Nyasaland) Sam Tingle	Sam Tingle	LDS-Alfa Romeo		20
Ret	17	(South Africa) Dave Wright	Dave Wright	Cooper-Climax		21
Ret	3	(South Africa) Tony Maggs	Yeoman Credit Racing Team	Cooper-Climax	Overheating	5
Ret	9	(United Kingdom) Trevor Taylor	Team Lotus	Lotus-Climax	Accident	3
Ret	6	(United States) Masten Gregory	UDT Laystall Racing Team	Lotus-Climax	Cylinder head gasket	4
DNS	12	(Federation of Rhodesia and Nyasaland) John Love	A.H. Pillman	LDS-Porsche	Practice accident	-
WD	18	(South Africa) Clive Trundell	Clive Trundell	Cooper-Climax	Car not ready	-
WD	21	(South Africa) Bill Dunlop	Bill Dunlop	Cooper-Alfa Romeo	Car not ready	-
WD	22	(South Africa) Gordon Henderson	Gordon Henderson	Cooper-Alfa Romeo	Car not ready	-
WD	24	(South Africa) Gene Bosman	Scuderia Alfa	Lotus-Alfa Romeo	Car not ready	-
WD	28	(South Africa) Bernard Podmore	Bernard Podmore	Lotus-Ford	Car damaged	-
WD	30	(South Africa) Jack Holme	Jack Holme	Lotus-Climax	Car damaged	-

Previous race: 1961 Rand Grand Prix	Formula One non-championship races 1961 season	Next race: 1961 South African Grand Prix
Previous race: —	Natal Grand Prix	Next race: 1962 Natal Grand Prix
