= 1960 Buenos Aires Grand Prix =

Race details
- Date: 14 February 1960
- Official name: XIII Gran Premio Ciudad de Buenos Aires
- Location: Cordoba Province
- Course: Parque Sarmiento
- Course length: 3.100 km (1.926 miles)
- Distance: 75 laps, 232.478 km (144.450 miles)

Pole position
Driver	(Australia) Jack Brabham	Cooper-Climax
- Time: 1:27.3

Fastest lap
Driver	(New Zealand) Bruce McLaren	Cooper-Climax
- Time: 1:27.2

Podium
First	(France) Maurice Trintignant	Cooper-Climax
Second	(United States) Dan Gurney	BRM
Third	(Italy) Gino Munaron	Maserati

The 1960 Buenos Aires Grand Prix was a Formula Libre race over 75 laps of the Parque Sarmiento circuit in Cordoba. The race was won by Maurice Trintignant in a Cooper T51.

== Entry list ==
Pos	Driver	Entrant	Constructor	Time/Retired	Grid
1	(France) Maurice Trintignant	R.R.C. Walker Racing Team	Cooper T51-Climax	1:53:50.9, 122.53 km/h	2
2	(United States) Dan Gurney	Owen Racing Organisation	BRM P25	1:54:38.5 (+47.6s)	4
3	(Italy) Gino Munaron	Gino Munaron	Maserati 250F	70 laps	11
4	(Venezuela) Ettore Chimeri	Escuderia Sorocaima	Maserati 250F	63 laps	15
5	(Sweden) Jo Bonnier	Owen Racing Organisation	BRM P25	53 laps	3
Ret	(United Kingdom) Alan Stacey	Team Lotus	Lotus 16-Climax		9
Ret	(Argentina) Roberto Bonomi	Scuderia Centro Sud	Cooper T51-Maserati		13
Ret	(Australia) Jack Brabham	Cooper Car Company	Cooper T51-Climax		1
Ret	(Argentina) Carlos Menditéguy	Scuderia Centro Sud	Cooper T51-Maserati		5
Ret	(New Zealand) Bruce McLaren	Cooper Car Company	Cooper T45-Climax		7
Ret	(Argentina) José Froilán González	José Froilán González	Ferrari-Chevrolet		14
Ret	(Spain) Antonio Creus	Scuderia Centro Sud	Maserati 250F		16
Ret	(United States) Masten Gregory	Camoradi International	Behra-Porsche		12
Ret	(United Kingdom) Innes Ireland	Team Lotus	Lotus 18-Climax		6
Ret	(United States) Harry Schell	Ecurie Bleue	Cooper T51-Climax		8
DNS	(Argentina) Alberto Rodríguez Larreta	Team Lotus	Lotus 16-Climax		17
DNS	(Italy) Giorgio Scarlatti	Scuderia Centro Sud	Maserati 250F		10
