= 1960 International Gold Cup =

- Non-championship race in the 1960 Formula One season

Race details
- Date: 24 September 1960
- Official name: VII International Gold Cup
- Location: Oulton Park, Cheshire
- Course: Permanent racing facility
- Course length: 4.443 km (2.76 miles)
- Distance: 60 laps, 266.58 km (165.6 miles)
- Weather: Dry, sunny

Pole position
Driver	(United Kingdom) Stirling Moss	Lotus-Climax
- Time: 1:40.4

Fastest lap
Driver	(United Kingdom) Jim Clark	Lotus-Climax
- Time: 1:42.4

Podium
First	(United Kingdom) Stirling Moss	Lotus-Climax
Second	(Australia) Jack Brabham	Cooper-Climax
Third	(United Kingdom) Graham Hill	BRM

The VII International Gold Cup was a motor race, run to Formula One rules, held on 24 September 1960 at Oulton Park, Cheshire. The race was run over 60 laps of the circuit, and was won by British driver Stirling Moss in a Lotus 18.

The Scuderia Eugenio Castellotti team did not arrive after their transporter was involved in an accident and the cars were damaged. During the race, Ian Burgess was black-flagged due to his car grounding excessively.

This was the last European Formula One race run to the 2.5 litre Formula, with the new 1.5 litre Formula being introduced for 1961.

== Results ==
Pos	No.	Driver	Entrant	Constructor	Time/Retired	Grid
1	7	(United Kingdom) Stirling Moss	R.R.C. Walker Racing Team	Lotus-Climax	1.45:54.0	1
2	1	(Australia) Jack Brabham	Cooper Car Company	Cooper-Climax	+ 22.8 s	3
3	16	(United Kingdom) Graham Hill	Owen Racing Organisation	BRM	+ 47.4 s	4
4	2	(New Zealand) Bruce McLaren	Cooper Car Company	Cooper-Climax	+ 55.8 s	5
5	14	(Sweden) Jo Bonnier	Owen Racing Organisation	BRM	59 laps	10
6	15	(United States) Dan Gurney	Owen Racing Organisation	BRM	58 laps	8
7	8	(United Kingdom) Henry Taylor	Yeoman Credit Racing Team	Cooper-Climax	58 laps	11
8	9	(United Kingdom) Bruce Halford	Yeoman Credit Racing Team	Cooper-Climax	57 laps	12
Ret	3	(United Kingdom) Ron Flockhart	Jack Brabham	Cooper-Climax	Gearbox	14
Ret	4	(United Kingdom) Innes Ireland	Team Lotus	Lotus-Climax	Engine	6
Ret	12	(United Kingdom) Roy Salvadori	C.T. Atkins	Cooper-Climax	Steering	9
DSQ	22	(United Kingdom) Ian Burgess	Scuderia Centro Sud	Lotus-Maserati	Black-flagged	18
Ret	5	(United Kingdom) Jim Clark	Team Lotus	Lotus-Climax	Collision	2
Ret	18	(United Kingdom) Brian Naylor	JB Engineering	JBW-Maserati	Collision	13
Ret	19	(United Kingdom) Geoff Richardson	Geoff Richardson	Cooper-Connaught	Oil leak	15
Ret	6	(United Kingdom) John Surtees	Team Lotus	Lotus-Climax	Fuel pump	7
Ret	20	(United States) Masten Gregory	Scuderia Centro Sud	Cooper-Maserati	Gearbox	17
Ret	21	(France) Maurice Trintignant	Scuderia Centro Sud	Cooper-Maserati	Gearbox	16
DNA	10	(Italy) Giorgio Scarlatti	Scuderia Eugenio Castellotti	Cooper-Ferrari	Transporter crash	–
DNA	11	(Italy) Gino Munaron	Scuderia Eugenio Castellotti	Cooper-Ferrari	Transporter crash	–
DNA	17	(United Kingdom) David Piper	Robert Bodle Ltd	Lotus-Climax	Car not ready	–

Previous race: 1960 Lombank Trophy	Formula One non-championship races 1960 season	Next race: 1961 Lombank Trophy
Previous race: 1959 International Gold Cup	Oulton Park International Gold Cup	Next race: 1961 International Gold Cup
