= 1962 Natal Grand Prix =

- Non-championship race in the 1962 Formula One season

Race details
- Date: 22 December 1962
- Official name: II Natal Grand Prix
- Location: Westmead Circuit, Durban

Pole position
Driver	(United Kingdom) Jim Clark	Lotus-Climax
- Time: 1:22.11

Fastest lap
Driver	(United Kingdom) Trevor Taylor	Lotus-Climax
- Time: 1:24.2

Podium
First	(United Kingdom) Trevor Taylor	Lotus-Climax
Second	(United Kingdom) Jim Clark	Lotus-Climax
Third	(United States) Richie Ginther	BRM

The 2nd Natal Grand Prix was a motor race, run to South African Formula One-style rules, held on 22 December 1962 at Westmead Circuit, South Africa. The field was split into two heats, with a subsequent final. The heats consisted of 22 laps, and the final was run over 33 laps, and was won by British driver Trevor Taylor in his Lotus 25.

The event was marred by the death of Rhodesian driver Gary Hocking, who was killed in practice driving the Rob Walker Racing Team Lotus 24.

Jim Clark posted the fastest time in practice, and was on pole position for the first heat. However, after exchanging the lead several times with Richie Ginther, he experienced problems during the heat and was classified 12th. Ginther won the heat with local driver Bruce Johnstone finishing second. Graham Hill was on pole for the second heat, which was won by Taylor with Hill second, after a battle throughout the race.

Clark started at the back of the grid for the final, with Ginther, Taylor and Hill forming the front row. Hill's car suffered ignition failure, but Clark raced through the field to beat Ginther and take second behind Taylor, who led throughout.

== Qualifying ==
Pos	No.	Driver	Constructor	Lap	Gap
1	1	(United Kingdom) Jim Clark	Lotus-Climax	1:22.11	-
2	3	(United Kingdom) Graham Hill	BRM	1:22.67	+ 0.56
3	2	(United Kingdom) Trevor Taylor	Lotus-Climax	1:22.79	+ 0.68
4	4	(United States) Richie Ginther	BRM	1:24.06	+ 1.95
5	6	(Federation of Rhodesia and Nyasaland) Gary Hocking	Lotus-Climax	1:25.10	+ 2.99
6	26	(South Africa) Bruce Johnstone	BRM	1:25.95	+ 3.84
7	9	(South Africa) Neville Lederle	Lotus-Climax	1:26.20	+ 4.09
8	14	(South Africa) Syd van der Vyver	Lotus-Climax	1:26.62	+ 4.51
9	15	(Federation of Rhodesia and Nyasaland) John Love	Cooper-Climax	1:27.35	+ 5.24
10	12	(South Africa) Peter de Klerk	Alfa Special-Alfa Romeo	1:27.92	+ 5.81
11	7	(South Africa) Ernie Pieterse	Lotus-Climax	1:27.96	+ 5.85
12	11	(South Africa) Doug Serrurier	LDS-Alfa Romeo	1:28.89	+ 6.78
13	17	(South Africa) Bernard Podmore	Lotus-Climax	1:29.27	+ 7.16
14	10	(Federation of Rhodesia and Nyasaland) Sam Tingle	LDS-Alfa Romeo	1:30.17	+ 8.06
15	18	(South Africa) Fanie Viljoen	LDS-Climax	1:30.22	+ 8.11
16	21	(South Africa) Bob van Niekerk	Lotus-Climax	1:30.35	+ 8.24
17	16	(South Africa) Mike Harris	Cooper-Alfa Romeo	1:31.38	+ 9.27
18	25	(South Africa) Gene Bosman	LDS-Alfa Romeo	1:31.43	+ 9.32
19	31	(South Africa) Peter van Niekerk	Lotus-Ford	1:32.59	+ 10.48
20	35	(South Africa) Clive Trundell	Cooper-Maserati	1:33.54	+ 11.43
21	32	(South Africa) Brausch Niemann	Lotus-Ford	1:33.65	+ 11.54
22	19	(South Africa) Trevor Blokdyk	Cooper-Alfa Romeo	1:33.80	+ 11.69
23	29	(South Africa) Gordon Henderson	Scorpion-Alfa Romeo	1:34.28	+ 12.17
24	37	(Federation of Rhodesia and Nyasaland) Dave Riley	Cooper-BMC	1:34.97	+ 12.86
25	30	(South Africa) Vern McWilliams	Lotus-Borgward	1:36.44	+ 14.33
26	39	(South Africa) Jack Holme	Lotus-Climax	1:36.46	+ 14.35
27	33	(South Africa) Errol Hammon	LDS-Ford	1:36.61	+ 14.50
28	36	(South Africa) Dave Charlton	Lotus-Ford	1:36.83	+ 14.72
29	27	(South Africa) Bill Dunlop	Cooper-Alfa Romeo	1:37.13	+ 15.02
30	5	(South Africa) Bill Scheepers	Lotus-Alfa Romeo	1:37.23	+ 15.12
31	20	(Australia) Ray Cresp	Cooper-Alfa Romeo	1:37.94	+ 15.83
32	38	(South Africa) Eric Glasby	Cooper-Alfa Romeo	1:40.30	+ 18.19
33	24	(South Africa) Tony Neave	Cooper-Alfa Romeo	1:45.82	+ 23.71

=== Non-starters ===
Pos	No.	Driver	Entrant	Constructor
DNS	6	(Federation of Rhodesia and Nyasaland) Gary Hocking	Rob Walker Racing Team	Lotus-Climax
WD	8	(South Africa) John Guthrie	John Guthrie	Cooper-Alfa Romeo
WD	22	(South Africa) Neville Austin	Neville Austin	Cooper-Climax
WD	23	(South Africa) Doug Serrurier	Scuderia Lupini	Cooper-Maserati
WD	28	(South Africa) Tony Kotze	Bond Cars	Assegai-Alfa Romeo
WD	34	(South Africa) Lionel Wilmot	Lionel Wilmot	Lotus-Ford
WD	40	(South Africa) Peter Bosch	Windhoek Motor Club	Heron-Alfa Romeo
WD	41	(South Africa) Peter Bosch	Windhoek Motor Club	Cooper-Climax

- Car #23 was withdrawn by Serrurier, who drove #11 in the race. The withdrawn car was ultimately driven by Trundell and wore #35.

== Results ==
=== Heat one ===
Pos	Driver	Entrant	Constructor	Time/Retired	Grid
1	(United States) Richie Ginther	Owen Racing Organisation	BRM	31:56.8	2
2	(South Africa) Bruce Johnstone	Bruce Johnstone	BRM	+ 53.5 s	3
3	(South Africa) Syd van der Vyver	Syd van der Vyver	Lotus-Climax	+ 1:00.9	4
4	(Federation of Rhodesia and Nyasaland) Sam Tingle	Sam Tingle	LDS-Alfa Romeo		8
5	(South Africa) Fanie Viljoen	G.E. Mennie	LDS-Climax		9
6	(South Africa) Clive Trundell	Clive Trundell	Cooper-Maserati		10
7	(Federation of Rhodesia and Nyasaland) John Love	John Love	Cooper-Climax		5
8	(South Africa) Jack Holme	Jack Holme	Lotus-Climax		14
9	(South Africa) Peter van Niekerk	Ted Lanfear	Lotus-Ford		11
10	(South Africa) Doug Serrurier	Otelle Nucci	LDS-Alfa Romeo		6
11	(South Africa) Bill Dunlop	Bill Dunlop	Cooper-Alfa Romeo		15
12	(United Kingdom) Jim Clark	Team Lotus	Lotus-Climax		1
13	(South Africa) Bernard Podmore	Grosvenor Motors	Lotus-Climax		7
14	(South Africa) Vern McWilliams	Vern McWilliams	Lotus-Borgward		13
Ret	(South Africa) Brausch Niemann	Brausch Niemann	Lotus-Ford		12
Ret	(South Africa) Eric Glasby	Eric Glasby	Cooper-Alfa Romeo		16

=== Heat two ===
Pos	Driver	Entrant	Constructor	Time/Retired	Grid
1	(United Kingdom) Trevor Taylor	Team Lotus	Lotus-Climax	32:19.6	2
2	(United Kingdom) Graham Hill	Owen Racing Organisation	BRM	+ 2.2 s	1
3	(South Africa) Neville Lederle	Neville Lederle	Lotus-Climax	+ 51.0 s	3
4	(South Africa) Peter de Klerk	Otelle Nucci	Alfa Special	+ 1:15.6	4
5	(South Africa) Ernie Pieterse	Ernie Pieterse	Lotus-Climax	+ 1:22.2	5
6	(South Africa) Bob van Niekerk	Equipe Judette	Lotus-Climax		6
7	(South Africa) Gene Bosman	Gene Bosman	LDS-Alfa Romeo		8
8	(Australia) Ray Cresp	Hoffman Racing Team	Cooper-Alfa Romeo		15
9	(Federation of Rhodesia and Nyasaland) Dave Riley	Dave Riley	Cooper-BMC		11
10	(South Africa) Trevor Blokdyk	Hoffman Racing Team	Cooper-Alfa Romeo		9
11	(South Africa) Gordon Henderson	Gordon Henderson	Scorpion-Alfa Romeo		10
Ret	(South Africa) Mike Harris	Mike Harris	Cooper-Alfa Romeo		7
Ret	(South Africa) Errol Hammon	Errol Hammon	LDS-Ford		12
Ret	(South Africa) Dave Charlton	Ecurie Tomahawk	Lotus-Ford		13
Ret	(South Africa) Bill Scheepers	H. Muller	Lotus-Alfa Romeo		14
Ret	(South Africa) Tony Neave	A & G Conversions	Cooper-Alfa Romeo		16

=== Final ===
Pos	Driver	Entrant	Constructor	Time/Retired	Grid
1	(United Kingdom) Trevor Taylor	Team Lotus	Lotus-Climax	48:08.7	2
2	(United Kingdom) Jim Clark	Team Lotus	Lotus-Climax	+ 6.1 s	22
3	(United States) Richie Ginther	Owen Racing Organisation	BRM	+ 22.1 s	1
4	(South Africa) Neville Lederle	Neville Lederle	Lotus-Climax	32 laps	6
5	(South Africa) Ernie Pieterse	Ernie Pieterse	Lotus-Climax	32 laps	8
6	(Federation of Rhodesia and Nyasaland) John Love	John Love	Cooper-Climax	32 laps	13
7	(South Africa) Peter de Klerk	Otelle Nucci	Alfa Special	32 laps	7
8	(Federation of Rhodesia and Nyasaland) Sam Tingle	Sam Tingle	LDS-Alfa Romeo	31 laps	9
9	(South Africa) Gene Bosman	Gene Bosman	LDS-Alfa Romeo		14
10	(South Africa) Doug Serrurier	Otelle Nucci	LDS-Alfa Romeo		18
11	(South Africa) Bob van Niekerk	Equipe Judette	Lotus-Climax		12
12	(South Africa) Fanie Viljoen	G.E. Mennie	LDS-Climax		10
13	(South Africa) Clive Trundell	Clive Trundell	Cooper-Maserati		11
14	(South Africa) Jack Holme	Jack Holme	Lotus-Climax		16
15	(United Kingdom) Graham Hill	Owen Racing Organisation	BRM		3
16	(Australia) Ray Cresp	Hoffman Racing Team	Cooper-Alfa Romeo		15
Ret	(Federation of Rhodesia and Nyasaland) Dave Riley	Dave Riley	Cooper-BMC		19
Ret	(South Africa) Peter van Niekerk	Ted Lanfear	Lotus-Ford		17
Ret	(South Africa) Trevor Blokdyk	Hoffman Racing Team	Cooper-Alfa Romeo		20
Ret	(South Africa) Bill Dunlop	Bill Dunlop	Cooper-Alfa Romeo		21
Ret	(South Africa) Bruce Johnstone	Bruce Johnstone	BRM	Oil leak	4
Ret	(South Africa) Syd van der Vyver	Syd van der Vyver	Lotus-Climax	Accident	5

Previous race: 1962 Rand Grand Prix	Formula One non-championship races 1962 season	Next race: 1963 Lombank Trophy
Previous race: 1961 Natal Grand Prix	Natal Grand Prix	Next race: —
