= 1961 Rand Grand Prix =

- Non-championship race in the 1961 Formula One season
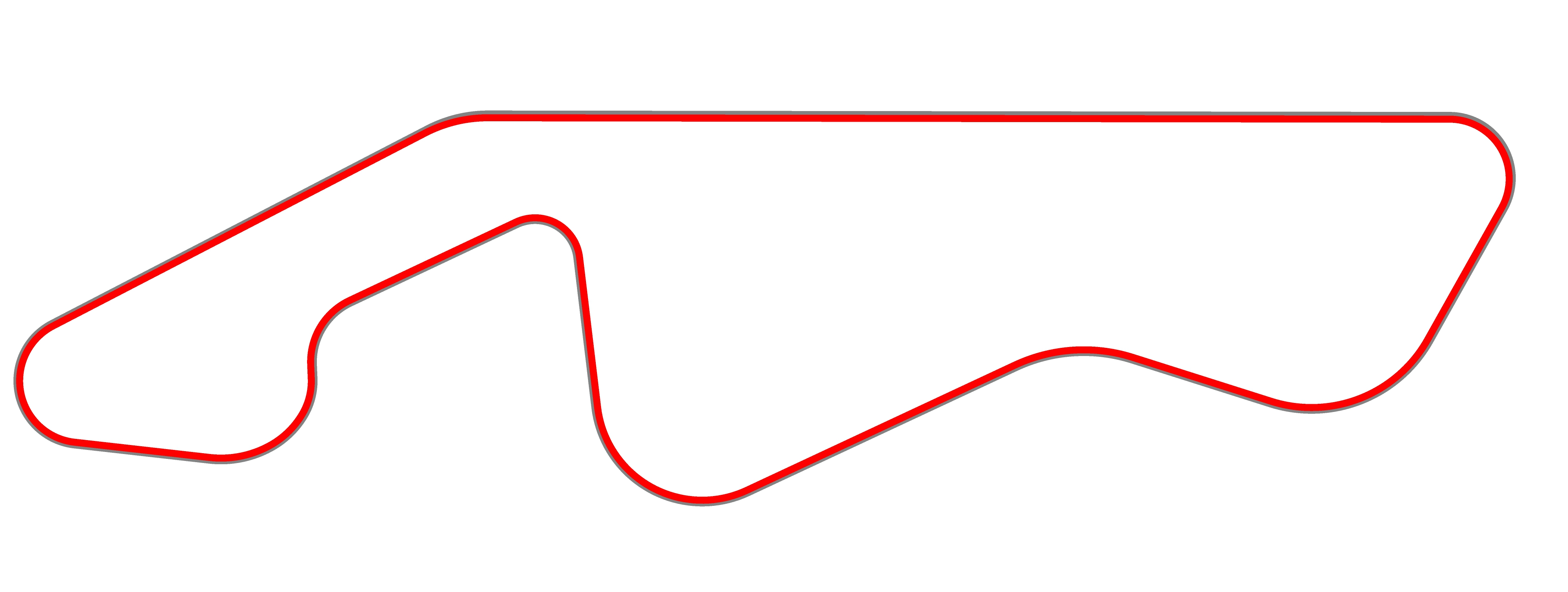

Race details
- Date: 9 December 1961
- Official name: IV Rand Grand Prix
- Location: Kyalami, Johannesburg
- Course: Permanent racing facility
- Course length: 4.096 km (2.545 miles)
- Distance: 75 laps, 307.184 km (190.875 miles)

Pole position
Driver	(United Kingdom) Jim Clark	Lotus-Climax
- Time: 1:38.5

Fastest lap
Driver	(Sweden) Jo Bonnier	Porsche
- Time: 1:39.1

Podium
First	(United Kingdom) Jim Clark	Lotus-Climax
Second	(United Kingdom) Trevor Taylor	Lotus-Climax
Third	(Sweden) Jo Bonnier	Porsche

The 4th Rand Grand Prix was a motor race, run to South African Formula One-style rules, held on 9 December 1961 at Kyalami, South Africa. The race was run over 75 laps of the circuit, and was won by British driver Jim Clark, who led from start to finish in his Lotus 21.

There were no great differences between the local rules to which this race was run and the international Formula One rules, but for example sports car bodies were permitted, such as those driven by Jennings and Bosman.

== Results ==
Pos	Driver	Entrant	Constructor	Time/Retired	Grid
1	(United Kingdom) Jim Clark	Team Lotus	Lotus-Climax	2.06:26.3	1
2	(United Kingdom) Trevor Taylor	Team Lotus	Lotus-Climax	+ 0.1 s	2
3	(Sweden) Jo Bonnier	Porsche System Engineering	Porsche	+ 22.0 s	4
4	(Germany) Edgar Barth	Porsche System Engineering	Porsche	74 laps	9
5	(South Africa) Bruce Johnstone	Yeoman Credit Racing Team	Cooper-Climax	73 laps	8
6	(South Africa) Ernie Pieterse	Scuderia Alfa	Heron-Alfa Romeo	72 laps	7
7	(South Africa) Syd van der Vyver	Syd van der Vyver	Lotus-Alfa Romeo	72 laps	6
8	(South Africa) Fanie Viljoen	G.E. Mennie	LDS-Climax	70 laps	16
9	(South Africa) Bob van Niekerk	Equipe Judette	Lotus-Ford	70 laps	13
10	(South Africa) Doug Serrurier	Scuderia Lupini	Cooper-Maserati	69 laps	15
11	(South Africa) Bruce Jennings	Bill Jennings	Jennings-Porsche	67 laps	19
Ret	(United States) Masten Gregory	UDT Laystall Racing Team	Lotus-Climax	Overheating	3
Ret	(Federation of Rhodesia and Nyasaland) Sam Tingle	Sam Tingle	LDS-Alfa Romeo	Gearbox	14
Ret	(South Africa) Bernard Podmore	Bernard Podmore	Lotus-Ford	Accident	21
Ret	(South Africa) Helmut Menzler	Ecurie Wolman	Lotus-Borgward	Overheating	10
Ret	(South Africa) John Guthrie	Ecurie Rhodes	Cooper-Alfa Romeo	Water pipe	17
Ret	(South Africa) Tony Maggs	Yeoman Credit Racing Team	Cooper-Climax	Overheating	5
Ret	(South Africa) Bill Dunlop	Bill Dunlop	Cooper-Alfa Romeo	Engine	23
Ret	(South Africa) Don Philp	Don Philp	Quodra-Climax	Overheating	11
Ret	(South Africa) Rauten Hartmann	Rauten Hartmann	Netuar-Peugeot	Engine	24
Ret	(South Africa) Gene Bosman	Scuderia Alfa	Lotus-Alfa Romeo	Engine	20
Ret	(South Africa) Jack Holme	Jack Holme	Lotus-Climax	Accident	22
Ret	(South Africa) Trevor Blokdyk	Trevor Blokdyk	Cooper-Ford	Accident	18
Ret	(South Africa) Clive Trundell	Clive Trundell	Cooper-Climax	Puncture	25
DNS	(South Africa) Adrian Pheiffer	Adrian Pheiffer	Cooper-Alfa Romeo	Engine in practice	(12)
WD	(South Africa) Neville Lederle	Neville Lederle	Lotus-Ford	Car not ready	-
WD	(Federation of Rhodesia and Nyasaland) John Love	A.H. Pillman	LDS-Porsche	Car not ready	-
WD	(South Africa) Dawie Gous	Dawie Gous	Porsche RSK	Car not ready	-

- Bonnier was still on his warm-up lap when the race started, thus he was half a lap down at the start.

Previous race: 1961 Coppa Italia	Formula One non-championship races 1961 season	Next race: 1961 Natal Grand Prix
Previous race: 1956 Rand Grand Prix	Rand Grand Prix	Next race: 1962 Rand Grand Prix
