= 1960 Lombank Trophy =

- Non-championship race in the 1960 Formula One season

Race details
- Date: 17 September 1960
- Official name: I Lombank Trophy
- Location: Snetterton Motor Racing Circuit, Norfolk
- Course: Permanent racing facility
- Course length: 4.360 km (2.71 miles)
- Distance: 37 laps, 161.33 km (100.25 miles)

Pole position
Driver	(United Kingdom) Graham Hill	BRM
- Time: 1:34.6

Fastest lap
Driver	(United Kingdom) Jim Clark	Lotus-Climax
- Time: 1:32.6

Podium
First	(United Kingdom) Innes Ireland	Lotus-Climax
Second	(United Kingdom) Jim Clark	Lotus-Climax
Third	(Sweden) Jo Bonnier	BRM

The First Lombank Trophy was a motor race, run to Formula One rules, held on 17 September 1960 at Snetterton Motor Racing Circuit, England. The race was run over 37 laps of the circuit, and was won by British driver Innes Ireland in a Lotus 18.

The field included a large number of Formula Two cars.

== Results ==
Pos	No.	Driver	Entrant	Constructor	Time/Retired	Grid
1	6	(United Kingdom) Innes Ireland	Team Lotus	Lotus-Climax	58:33.8	5
2	8	(United Kingdom) Jim Clark	Team Lotus	Lotus-Climax	+ 13.0 s	2
3	2	(Sweden) Jo Bonnier	Owen Racing Organisation	BRM	+ 1:02.8 s	3
4	9	(United Kingdom) Roy Salvadori	C.T. Atkins / High Efficiency Motors	Cooper-Climax	+ 1:29.4 s	7
5	4	(New Zealand) Denis Hulme	Yeoman Credit Racing Team	Cooper-Climax	36 laps	8
6	22	(United Kingdom) Jack Lewis	H & L Motors	Cooper-Climax (F2)	35 laps	14
7	27	(United Kingdom) Bruce Halford	John Fisher	Cooper-Climax (F2)	35 laps	12
8	19	(United Kingdom) John Whitmore	Essex Racing Team	Cooper-Climax (F2)	35 laps	17
9	14	(United Kingdom) Tom Dickson	Ecurie Ecosse	Cooper-Climax	34 laps	16
10	16	(United Kingdom) Ian Raby	Empire Cars, Brighton	Hume-Cooper-Climax (F2)		19
11	25	(United Kingdom) Keith Finney	Keith Finney	Lotus-Climax (F2)		21
12	24	(United Kingdom) Marcus Niven	Marcus Niven	Lotus-Climax (F2)		22
13	21	(United Kingdom) Keith Ballisat	Equipe Prideaux / Dick Gibson	Cooper-Climax (F2)		18
14	26	(United Kingdom) Bob Hicks	Team Thercel	Lotus-Climax (F2)		20
Ret	5	(United Kingdom) Henry Taylor	Yeoman Credit Racing Team	Cooper-Climax	Engine	6
Ret	1	(United Kingdom) Graham Hill	Owen Racing Organisation	BRM	Engine	1
Ret	18	(South Africa) Tony Maggs	Essex Racing Team	Cooper-Climax (F2)		11
Ret	7	(United Kingdom) John Surtees	Team Lotus	Lotus-Climax	Mechanical	4
Ret	17	(United Kingdom) Mike McKee	Jim Russell Racing Drivers School	Cooper-Climax (F2)	Accident damage	15
Ret	11	(United Kingdom) Geoff Richardson	Geoff Richardson	Cooper-Connaught		13
Ret	12	(United Kingdom) Brian Naylor	JBW Car Co.	JBW-Maserati		10
DNS	3	(United States) Dan Gurney	Owen Racing Organisation	BRM	Transmission	(9)
DNS	15	(United Kingdom) Tony Brooks	Vandervell Products	Lotus-Vanwall	Engine	–
DNA	10	(United Kingdom) David Piper	Robert Bodle Ltd	Lotus-Climax	Car not ready	–
DNA	20	(United Kingdom) Gordon Jones	Gordon Jones	Cooper-Climax (F2)		–
DNA	23	(United Kingdom) Peter Ashdown	G. Smith	Lola-Climax (F2)		–

- A number of other Formula One cars may have been entered for this race but are not confirmed. These were New Zealander George Lawton in a Cooper-Climax, possibly entered by Yeoman Credit Racing; a second Team Thercel entry (#26), a Lotus-Climax driven by British driver Richard Utley; and two Scuderia Eugenio Castellotti Cooper-Ferraris without named drivers.

Previous race: 1960 Silver City Trophy	Formula One non-championship races 1960 season	Next race: 1960 International Gold Cup
Previous race: —	Lombank Trophy	Next race: 1961 Lombank Trophy
