= 1962 BRDC International Trophy =

- Non-championship race in the 1962 Formula One season
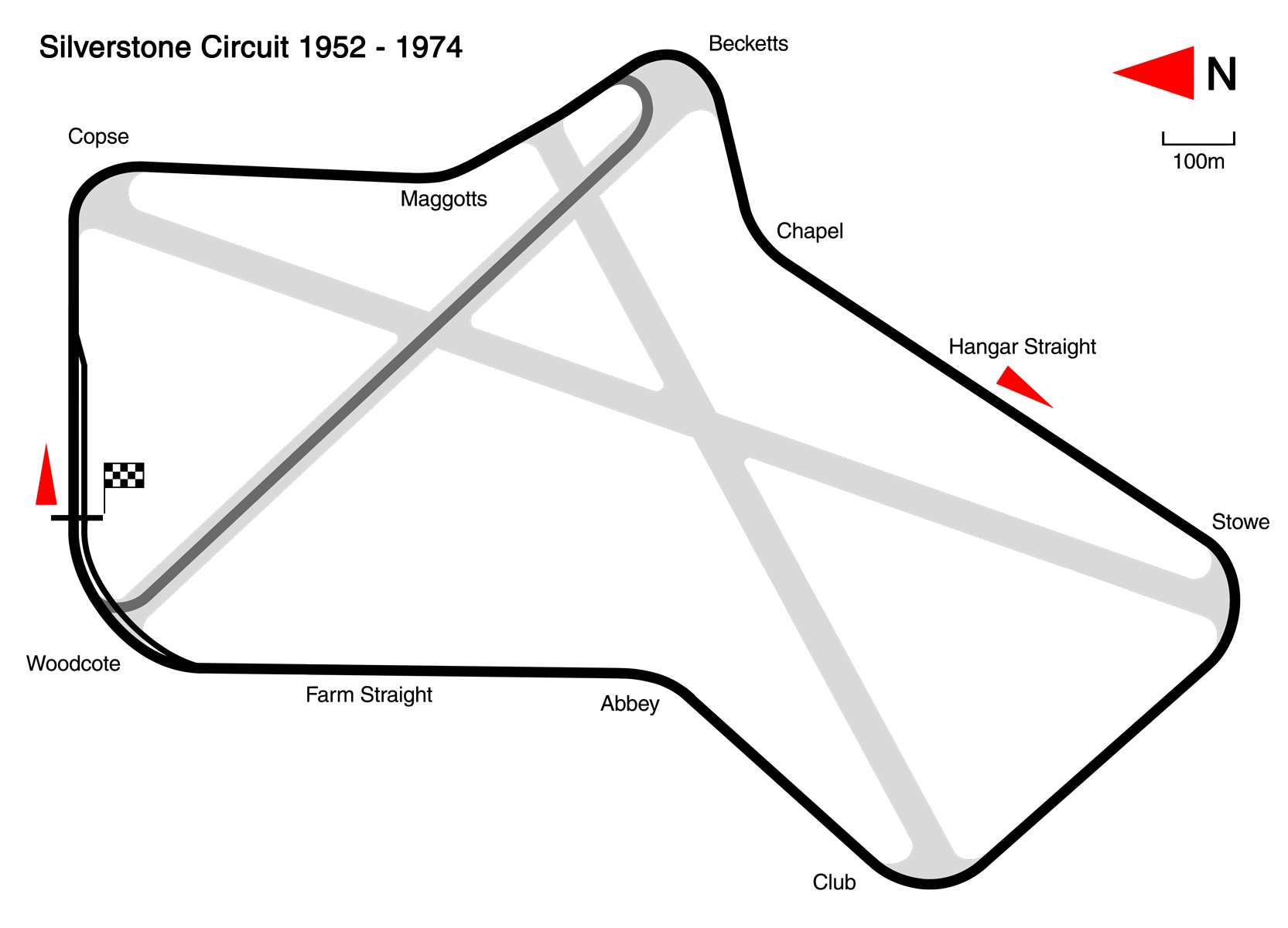

Race details
- Date: 12 May 1962
- Official name: XIV BRDC International Trophy
- Location: Silverstone Circuit, Northamptonshire
- Course: Permanent racing facility
- Course length: 4.711 km (2.927 miles)
- Distance: 52 laps, 244.972 km (152.204 miles)

Pole position
| Driver | (United Kingdom) Graham Hill | BRM |
- Time: 1:34.6

Fastest lap
| Driver | (United Kingdom) Jim Clark | Lotus-Climax |
- Time: 1:36.4

Podium
| First | (United Kingdom) Graham Hill | BRM |
| Second | (United Kingdom) Jim Clark | Lotus-Climax |
| Third | (United Kingdom) John Surtees | Lola-Climax |

The 14th BRDC International Trophy was a motor race, run for cars complying with the Formula One rules, held on 12 May 1962 at the Silverstone Circuit, England. The race was run over 52 laps of the Silverstone Grand Prix circuit, and was won by British driver Graham Hill in a BRM P57.

== Results ==
| Pos | Driver | Entrant | Constructor | Time/Retired | Grid |
|---|---|---|---|---|---|
| 1 | (United Kingdom) Graham Hill | Owen Racing Organisation | BRM | 1.31:34.2 | 1 |
| 2 | (United Kingdom) Jim Clark | Team Lotus | Lotus-Climax | + 0.0 s | 2 |
| 3 | (United Kingdom) John Surtees | Bowmaker Racing Team | Lola-Climax | + 1:56.4 s | 3 |
| 4 | (United Kingdom) Innes Ireland | UDT-Laystall Racing Team | Ferrari | 51 laps | 6 |
| 5 | (New Zealand) Bruce McLaren | Cooper Car Company | Cooper-Climax | 51 laps | 7 |
| 6 | (Australia) Jack Brabham | Brabham Racing Organisation | Lotus-Climax | 51 laps | 13 |
| 7 | (United Kingdom) Tony Marsh | Owen Racing Organisation | BRM | 51 laps | 11 |
| 8 | (United States) Masten Gregory | UDT-Laystall Racing Team | Lotus-Climax | 51 laps | 8 |
| 9 | (United Kingdom) Jack Lewis | Ecurie Galloise | BRM | 50 laps | 5 |
| 10 | (United Kingdom) Trevor Taylor | Team Lotus | Lotus-Climax | 50 laps | 9 |
| 11 | (United Kingdom) John Campbell-Jones | Emeryson Cars | Emeryson-Climax | 49 laps | 10 |
| 12 | (Sweden) Jo Bonnier | Scuderia SSS Republica di Venezia | Porsche | 49 laps | 14 |
| 13 | (United Kingdom) John Rhodes | Gerard Racing | Cooper-Ford | 49 laps | 17 |
| 14 | (United States) Tony Settember | Emeryson Cars | Emeryson-Climax | 48 laps | 19 |
| 15 | (United Kingdom) Keith Greene | Gilby Engineering | Gilby-Climax | 47 laps | 15 |
| 16 | (United States) Jay Chamberlain | Jay Chamberlain | Lotus-Climax | 46 laps | 22 |
| 17 | (United Kingdom) David Piper | Gerry Ashmore | Lotus-Climax | 45 laps | 21 |
| 18 | (United Kingdom) Ian Burgess | Anglo-American Equipe | Cooper-Climax | 43 laps | 24 |
| Ret | (France) Maurice Trintignant | Rob Walker Racing Team | Lotus-Climax | Ignition | 16 |
| Ret | (Italy) Nino Vaccarella | Scuderia SSS Republica di Venezia | Lotus-Climax | Valve | 18 |
| Ret | (United Kingdom) Tim Parnell | Tim Parnell | Lotus-Climax | Oil pressure | 23 |
| Ret | (United States) Richie Ginther | Owen Racing Organisation | BRM | Accident | 4 |
| Ret | (New Zealand) Tony Shelly | John Dalton | Lotus-Climax | Accident | 20 |
| Ret | (United Kingdom) Roy Salvadori | Bowmaker Racing Team | Lola-Climax | Accident | 12 |
| WD | (United Kingdom) Gerry Ashmore | Derek Wilkinson | BRM | Car not ready | - |
| WD | (New Zealand) Ross Greenville | Ross Greenville | Cooper-Climax | Driver in New Zealand | - |

| Previous race: 1962 Aintree 200 | Formula One non-championship races 1962 season | Next race: 1962 Naples Grand Prix |
| Previous race: 1961 BRDC International Trophy | BRDC International Trophy | Next race: 1963 BRDC International Trophy |
