= 1960 Silver City Trophy =

- Non-championship race in the 1960 Formula One season

Race details
- Date: 1 August 1960
- Official name: V Silver City Trophy
- Location: Brands Hatch
- Course: Permanent racing facility
- Course length: 4.264 km (2.65 miles)
- Distance: 50 laps, 213.2 km (132.5 miles)

Pole position
Driver	(United Kingdom) Jim Clark	Lotus-Climax
- Time: 1:39.4

Fastest lap
Drivers	(Australia) Jack Brabham	Cooper-Climax
	(United Kingdom) Jim Clark	Lotus-Climax
- Time: 1:40.6

Podium
First	(Australia) Jack Brabham	Cooper-Climax
Second	(United Kingdom) Graham Hill	BRM
Third	(New Zealand) Bruce McLaren	Cooper-Climax

The 5th Silver City Trophy was a motor race, run to Formula One rules, held on 1 August 1960 at Brands Hatch Circuit. The race was run over 50 laps of the circuit, and was won by Australian driver Jack Brabham who led from start to finish in a Cooper T53.

== Results ==
Pos	No.	Driver	Entrant	Constructor	Time/Retired	Grid
1	2	(Australia) Jack Brabham	Cooper Car Company	Cooper-Climax	1.25:36.6	2
2	44	(United Kingdom) Graham Hill	Owen Racing Organisation	BRM	+ 4.4 s	4
3	4	(New Zealand) Bruce McLaren	Cooper Car Company	Cooper-Climax	+ 49.4 s	8
4	40	(United States) Phil Hill	Scuderia Ferrari	Ferrari	1:13.6 s	18
5	12	(United Kingdom) Henry Taylor	Yeoman Credit Racing Team	Cooper-Climax	49 laps	9
6	36	(United Kingdom) John Surtees	Team Lotus	Lotus-Climax	49 laps	6
7	8	(United States) Dan Gurney	Yeoman Credit Racing Team	Cooper-Climax	49 laps	10
8	10	(United Kingdom) Bruce Halford	Yeoman Credit Racing Team	Cooper-Climax	49 laps	12
9	42	(United States) Richie Ginther	Scuderia Ferrari	Ferrari	48 laps	13
10	30	(United Kingdom) Ian Burgess	Scuderia Centro Sud	Cooper-Maserati	48 laps	16
11	46	(United Kingdom) Brian Naylor	J.B. Naylor	JBW-Maserati	47 laps	23
12	26	(United Kingdom) Keith Greene	Gilby Engineering	Cooper-Maserati	47 laps	15
13	22	(Italy) Gino Munaron	Scuderia Eugenio Castellotti	Cooper-Ferrari	45 laps	19
14	24	(United Kingdom) Geoff Richardson	Geoff Richardson	Cooper-Connaught	45 laps	21
Ret	14	(United Kingdom) Roy Salvadori	C.T. Atkins / High Efficiency Motors	Cooper-Climax	Collision	7
Ret	38	(United Kingdom) David Piper	Robert Bodle Ltd	Lotus-Climax	Collision	17
Ret	28	(United States) Masten Gregory	Scuderia Centro Sud	Cooper-Maserati	Gearbox	22
Ret	34	(United Kingdom) Jim Clark	Team Lotus	Lotus-Climax	Gearbox	1
Ret	6	(United Kingdom) Tony Brooks	Yeoman Credit Racing Team	Cooper-Climax	Overheating	5
Ret	32	(United Kingdom) Innes Ireland	Team Lotus	Lotus-Climax	Oil pressure	3
Ret	16	(United Kingdom) George Wicken	C.T. Atkins / High Efficiency Motors	Cooper-Climax	Clutch	11
Ret	18	(Belgium) Lucien Bianchi	Fred Tuck Cars	Cooper-Climax	Engine	14
Ret	20	(Italy) Giorgio Scarlatti	Scuderia Eugenio Castellotti	Cooper-Ferrari	Gearbox	20
DNA	40	(Belgium) Willy Mairesse	Scuderia Ferrari	Ferrari		–

Previous race: 1960 BRDC International Trophy	Formula One non-championship races 1960 season	Next race: 1960 Lombank Trophy
Previous race: 1959 Silver City Trophy	Silver City Trophy	Next race: 1961 Silver City Trophy
