= 1964 Daily Mirror Trophy =

- Non-championship race in the 1964 Formula One season

Race details
- Date: 14 March 1964
- Official name: II Daily Mirror Trophy
- Location: Snetterton Motor Racing Circuit, Norfolk
- Course: Permanent racing facility
- Course length: 4.361 km (2.71 miles)
- Distance: 35 (reduced from 50) laps, 152.635 km (94.85 miles)
- Weather: Cold, sleet, snow

Pole position
Driver	(United Kingdom) Jim Clark	Lotus-Climax
- Time: 1:32.8

Fastest lap
Driver	(United Kingdom) Peter Arundell	Lotus-Climax
- Time: 1:51.2

Podium
First	(United Kingdom) Innes Ireland	BRP-BRM
Second	(Sweden) Jo Bonnier	Cooper-Climax
Third	(New Zealand) Bruce McLaren	Cooper-Climax

The 2nd Daily Mirror Trophy was a motor race, run to Formula One rules, held on 14 March 1964 at Snetterton Motor Racing Circuit, England. The race was run over 35 laps of the circuit, and was won by British driver Innes Ireland in a BRP.

The weather conditions for this race were atrocious, with driving sleet and snow, and the length of the race was cut from 50 laps to 35. Three of the favourites were out of contention early in the race, as Jim Clark and Jack Brabham suffered badly from their cars being fitted with smaller wheels than the others, while Graham Hill had an accident on lap 6, aquaplaning into an earth bank while leading. Peter Arundell led from then until lap 22 when his gearbox failed, and after Jo Bonnier led briefly, Ireland took the lead on lap 26 and pulled away to take the victory.

Giancarlo Baghetti was unable to make the start after his car's engine failed while it was being practised by Phil Hill.

== Results ==
Pos	No.	Driver	Entrant	Constructor	Time/Retired	Grid
1	14	(United Kingdom) Innes Ireland	British Racing Partnership	BRP-BRM	1.12:53.4	17
2	20	(Sweden) Jo Bonnier	Rob Walker Racing Team	Cooper-Climax	+ 20.0 s	6
3	9	(New Zealand) Bruce McLaren	Cooper Car Company	Cooper-Climax	+ 1:03.0 s	4
4	11	(United States) Phil Hill	Scuderia Centro Sud	BRM	+ 1:36.2	8
5	17	(New Zealand) Chris Amon	Reg Parnell Racing	Lotus-BRM	33 laps	9
6	25	(United Kingdom) Jackie Epstein	Epstein-Eyre Racing Team	BRM	32 laps	14
7	26	(Belgium) André Pilette	Equipe Scirocco Belge	Scirocco-Climax	31 laps	16
Ret	18	(United States) Peter Revson	Revson Racing (America)	Lotus-BRM	Accident	11
Ret	19	(United Kingdom) Ian Raby	Ian Raby (Racing)	Brabham-BRM	Accident	12
Ret	2	(United Kingdom) Peter Arundell	Team Lotus	Lotus-Climax	Gearbox	3
Ret	5	(Australia) Jack Brabham	Brabham Racing Organisation	Brabham-Climax	Scavenge pump	5
Ret	1	(United Kingdom) Jim Clark	Team Lotus	Lotus-Climax	Ignition	1
Ret	16	(United Kingdom) Mike Hailwood	Reg Parnell (Racing)	Lotus-BRM	Engine	18
Ret	15	(United Kingdom) Trevor Taylor	British Racing Partnership	Lotus-BRM	Engine	7
Ret	3	(United Kingdom) Graham Hill	Owen Racing Organisation	BRM	Accident	2
Ret	23	(United Kingdom) Jock Russell	Jock Russell	Lotus-Climax	Engine	15
Ret	22	(France) Bernard Collomb	Bernard Collomb	Lotus-Climax	Engine	13
DNS	12	(Italy) Giancarlo Baghetti	Scuderia Centro Sud	BRM	Engine	(10)
WD	4	(United States) Richie Ginther	Owen Racing Organisation	BRM	Car not ready	-
WD	21	(United Kingdom) Bob Anderson	DW Racing Enterprises	Brabham-Climax	Car not delivered	-
WD	24	(United Kingdom) Graham Eden	Graham Eden	Cooper Arden-Climax	Car not ready	-

Scuderia Ferrari had entered two cars, numbered 7 and 8, but withdrew before naming drivers. Brabham and Cooper entered cars given numbers 6 and 10 respectively, which were also withdrawn.

Previous race: 1963 Rand Grand Prix	Formula One non-championship races 1964 season	Next race: 1964 News of the World Trophy
Previous race: 1961 Daily Mirror Trophy	Daily Mirror Trophy	Next race: 1965 Daily Mirror Trophy
