= 1959 BRDC International Trophy =

- Non-championship race in the 1959 Formula One season
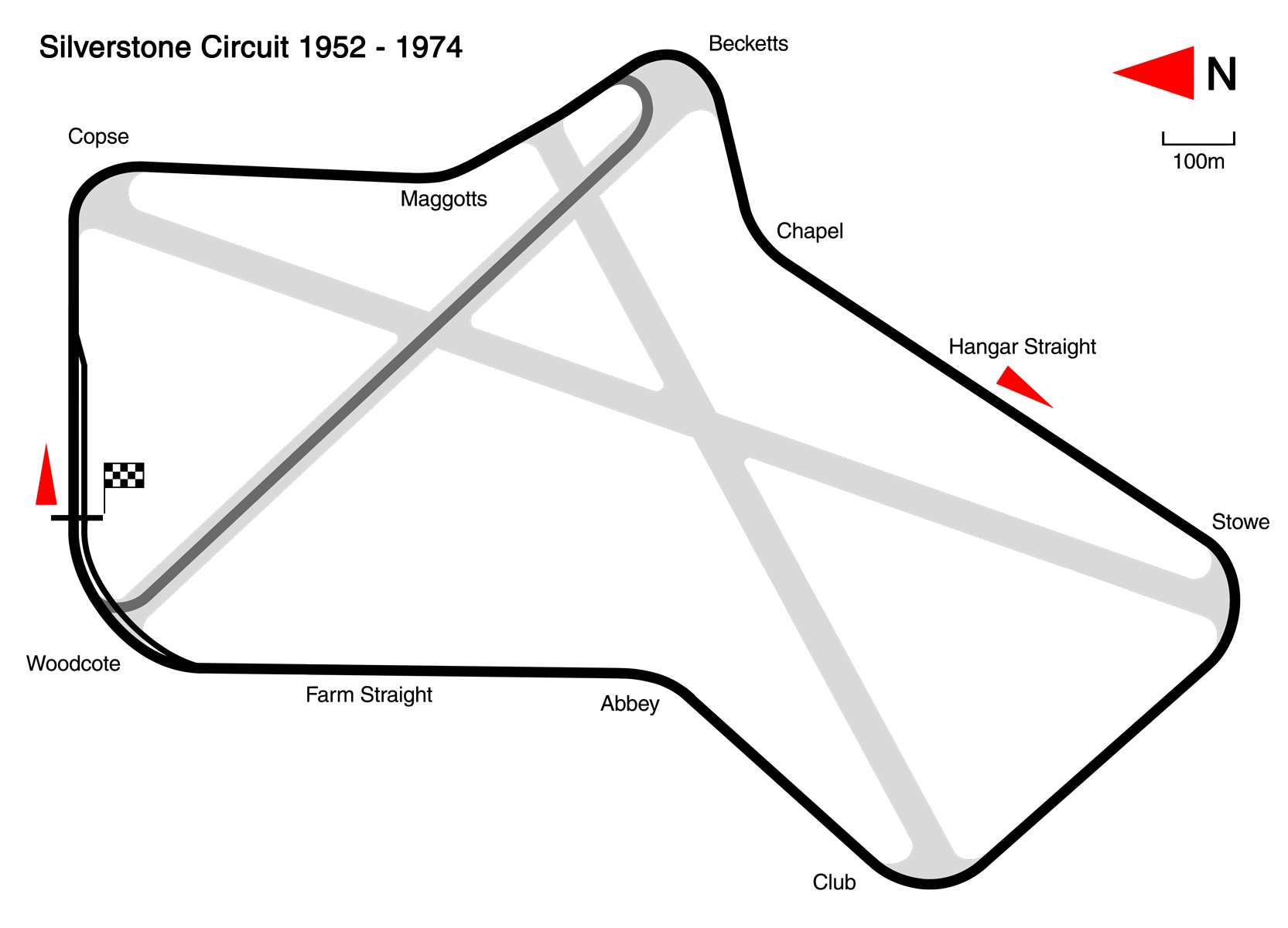

Race details
- Date: 2 May 1959
- Official name: XI BRDC International Trophy
- Location: Silverstone Circuit, Northamptonshire
- Course: Permanent racing facility
- Course length: 4.714 km (2.93 miles)
- Distance: 50 laps, 235.7 km (146.5 miles)

Pole position
Driver	(United Kingdom) Stirling Moss	BRM
- Time: 1:39.2

Fastest lap
Driver	(United Kingdom) Roy Salvadori	Aston Martin
- Time: 1:40.0

Podium
First	(Australia) Jack Brabham	Cooper-Climax
Second	(United Kingdom) Roy Salvadori	Aston Martin
Third	(United Kingdom) Ron Flockhart	BRM

The 11th BRDC International Trophy was a motor race, run to Formula One rules, held on 2 May 1959 at the Silverstone Circuit, England. The race was run over 50 laps of the Grand Prix circuit, and was won by Australian driver Jack Brabham in a Cooper T51.

The race marked the debut of Aston Martin's entry into Formula One motor racing. Both cars performed well, placing third and sixth in practice, and Roy Salvadori achieved fastest lap on his way to second place. However, their performance flattered to deceive, and they were never as competitive again.

The field also included several Formula Two cars, highest finisher being Jim Russell in a Cooper T45.

== Results ==
Note: a blue background indicates a car running under Formula 2 regulations.

Pos	No.	Driver	Entrant	Constructor	Time/Retired	Grid
1	3	(Australia) Jack Brabham	Cooper Car Company	Cooper-Climax T51	1h25m28.6, 165.34 km/h	4
2	1	(United Kingdom) Roy Salvadori	David Brown Corporation	Aston Martin DBR4/250	1h25m46.2 (+15.6s)	3
3	6	(United Kingdom) Ron Flockhart	Owen Racing Organisation	BRM P25	1h25m53.2 (+24.6s)	5
4	9	(United States) Phil Hill	Scuderia Ferrari	Ferrari Dino 246/59	49 laps	10
5	5	(United Kingdom) Jack Fairman	High Efficiency Motors	Cooper-Climax T45	49 laps	8
6	2	(United States) Carroll Shelby	David Brown Corporation	Aston Martin DBR4/250	48 laps - lubrication	6
7	21	(United Kingdom) Jim Russell	Jim Russell	Cooper-Climax T45	48 laps	12
8	26	(United Kingdom) Ivor Bueb	British Racing Partnership	Cooper-Borgward T51	48 laps	17
9	4	(United Kingdom) Ian Burgess	High Efficiency Motors	Cooper-Climax T43	48 laps	15
10	19	(United Kingdom) Tony Marsh	Tony Marsh	Cooper-Climax T45	48 laps	16
11	24	(United Kingdom) Innes Ireland	Team Lotus	Lotus-Climax 16	48 laps	14
12	23	(United Kingdom) Bill Moss	United Racing Stable	Cooper-Climax T51	46 laps	20
13	22	(United Kingdom) Tim Parnell	Tim Parnell	Cooper-Climax T45	46 laps	21
14	18	(United Kingdom) Mike Taylor	Cooper Car Company	Cooper-Climax T51	45 laps	11
NC	12	(United States) Pete Lovely	Team Lotus	Lotus-Climax 16	44 laps	7
Ret	10	(United Kingdom) Brian Naylor	JB Naylor	JBW-Maserati	41 laps - gearbox	no time
Ret	14	(Italy) Maria Teresa de Filippis	Scuderia Ugolini	Maserati 250F	40 laps - transmission	23
Ret	19	(New Zealand) Bruce McLaren	Cooper Car Company	Cooper-Climax T45	39 laps - transmission	13
Ret	8	(United Kingdom) Tony Brooks	Scuderia Ferrari	Ferrari Dino 246	29 laps - valve	2
Ret	17	(Brazil) Hermano da Silva Ramos	Scuderia Centro Sud	Maserati 250F	16 laps - gearbox	19
Ret	11	(United Kingdom) Graham Hill	Team Lotus	Lotus-Climax 16	9 laps - brake pipe	9
Ret	15	(Italy) Giorgio Scarlatti	Scuderia Ugolini	Maserati 250F	5 laps - split tank	18
Ret	7	(United Kingdom) Stirling Moss	Owen Racing Organisation	BRM P25	3 laps - brakes	1
DNS	16	(Germany) Hans Herrmann	Scuderia Centro Sud	Maserati 250F	-	22
DNA	25	(United Kingdom) Alan Stacey	Team Lotus	Lotus-Climax 16	car not ready	-

Previous race: 1959 BARC Aintree 200	Formula One non-championship races 1959 season	Next race: 1959 International Gold Cup
Previous race: 1958 BRDC International Trophy	BRDC International Trophy	Next race: 1960 BRDC International Trophy
