= 1961 Lombank Trophy =

- Non-championship race in the 1961 Formula One season

Race details
- Date: 26 March 1961
- Official name: II Lombank Trophy
- Location: Snetterton Motor Racing Circuit, Norfolk
- Course: Permanent racing facility
- Course length: 4.361 km (2.71 miles)
- Distance: 37 laps, 161.36 km (100.27 miles)
- Weather: Sunny, cool

Pole position
Driver	(United Kingdom) Innes Ireland	Lotus-Climax
- Time: 1:34.4

Fastest lap
Driver	(United Kingdom) Innes Ireland	Lotus-Climax
- Time: 1:33.6

Podium
First	(Australia) Jack Brabham	Cooper-Climax
Second	(United Kingdom) Cliff Allison	Lotus-Climax
Third	(United Kingdom) John Surtees	Cooper-Climax

The 2nd Lombank Trophy was a motor race, run to Formula One rules, held on 26 March 1961 at Snetterton Motor Racing Circuit, England. The race was run over 37 laps of the circuit, and was won by Australian driver Jack Brabham in a Cooper T53.

This was the first Formula One event in Europe to be run to the new 1.5 litre rules, and the field was bolstered by a number of Intercontinental Formula cars, i.e. cars that conformed to the old 2.5 litre Formula One. Only two of the Intercontinental Formula cars finished the race, but they were a lap ahead of the other finishers. Some of the cars conforming to the new Formula One regulations were converted Formula Two cars.

== Results ==
Note: a blue background indicates an Intercontinental Formula entrant.

Pos	No.	Driver	Entrant	Constructor	Time/Retired	Grid
1	1	(Australia) Jack Brabham	Tommy Atkins	Cooper-Climax	59:31.6	2
2	4	(United Kingdom) Cliff Allison	UDT-Laystall Racing Team	Lotus-Climax	+ 1:21.6 s	3
3	3	(United Kingdom) John Surtees	Yeoman Credit Racing Team	Cooper-Climax	36 laps	4
4	5	(United Kingdom) Henry Taylor	UDT-Laystall Racing Team	Lotus-Climax	36 laps	7
5	2	(United Kingdom) Roy Salvadori	Yeoman Credit Racing Team	Cooper-Climax	35 laps	5
6	7	(United Kingdom) Jim Clark	Team Lotus	Lotus-Climax	35 laps	6
7	19	(United Kingdom) Tim Parnell	Tim Parnell	Lotus-Climax	34 laps	11
8	16	(United Kingdom) Shane Summers	Terry Bartram	Cooper-Climax	32 laps	10
Ret	18	(United Kingdom) George Morgan	Tommy Atkins	Cooper-Climax	Engine	9
Ret	6	(United Kingdom) Innes Ireland	Team Lotus	Lotus-Climax	Gearbox	1
Ret	9	(United Kingdom) Brian Naylor	JBW Cars	JBW-Maserati	Engine	8
Ret	10	(France) Bernard Collomb	Bernard Collomb	Cooper-Climax	Engine	13
Ret	14	(United Kingdom) Graham Eden	Graham Eden	Cooper-Climax	Accident	14
Ret	15	(United Kingdom) John Langton	Ronald Wrenn	Hume Cooper-Climax	Engine	12
WD	8	(United Kingdom) Jack Fairman	Tommy Atkins	Cooper-Climax	Car not ready	-
WD	11	(United Kingdom) Geoff Richardson	Geoff Richardson	Cooper-Connaught	Car not ready	-
WD	12	(United Kingdom) John Campbell-Jones	John Campbell-Jones	Cooper-Climax		-
WD	17	(United Kingdom) Keith Greene	Gilby Engineering	Gilby-Climax	Car not ready	-
WD	20	(United Kingdom) Gerry Ashmore	Gerry Ashmore	Lotus-Climax	Car not delivered	-

Previous race: 1960 International Gold Cup	Formula One non-championship races 1961 season	Next race: 1961 Glover Trophy
Previous race: 1960 Lombank Trophy	Lombank Trophy	Next race: 1962 Lombank Trophy
