= 1961 South African Grand Prix =

- Non-championship race in the 1961 Formula One season

Race details
- Date: 26 December 1961
- Official name: 8th International RAC South African Grand Prix
- Location: Prince George Circuit, East London, South Africa
- Course: Temporary road circuit
- Course length: 3.92 km (2.436 miles)
- Distance: 80 laps, 313.6 km (194.88 miles)

Pole position
Driver	(United Kingdom) Jim Clark	Lotus-Climax
- Time: 1:33.9

Fastest lap
Driver	(United Kingdom) Jim Clark	Lotus-Climax
- Time: 1:33.1

Podium
First	(United Kingdom) Jim Clark	Lotus-Climax
Second	(United Kingdom) Stirling Moss	Lotus-Climax
Third	(Sweden) Jo Bonnier	Porsche

The 1961 South African Grand Prix, formally titled the 8th International RAC South African Grand Prix, was a non-championship Formula One motor race held at Prince George Circuit, East London, South Africa on 26 December 1961. The race, run over 80 laps of the circuit, was won from pole position by Scotland's Jim Clark, driving a works Lotus-Climax. Englishman Stirling Moss finished second in a private Lotus-Climax, while Swede Jo Bonnier was third in a Porsche.

== Results ==
Pos	Driver	Entrant	Constructor	Laps	Time/Retired	Grid
1	(United Kingdom) Jim Clark	Team Lotus	Lotus-Climax	80	2.06:49.2	1
2	(United Kingdom) Stirling Moss	UDT Laystall Racing Team	Lotus-Climax	80	+ 15.7	2
3	(Sweden) Jo Bonnier	Porsche System Engineering	Porsche	79	+ 1 Lap	4
4	(South Africa) Tony Maggs	Yeoman Credit Racing Team	Cooper-Climax	79	+ 1 Lap	6
5	(Germany) Edgar Barth	Porsche System Engineering	Porsche	78	+ 2 Laps	7
6	(South Africa) Syd van der Vyver	Syd van der Vyver	Lotus-Alfa Romeo	77	+ 3 Laps	8
7	(South Africa) Doug Serrurier	Scuderia Lupini	Cooper-Maserati	77	+ 3 Laps	12
8	(Federation of Rhodesia and Nyasaland) Sam Tingle	Sam Tingle	LDS-Alfa Romeo	76	+ 4 Laps	15
9	(South Africa) Bob van Niekerk	Ted Lanfear	Lotus-Ford	76	+ 4 Laps	16
10	(South Africa) Helmut Menzler	Ecurie Wolman	Lotus-Borgward	75	+ 5 Laps	14
11	(South Africa) Adrian Pheiffer	Adrian Pheiffer	Cooper-Alfa Romeo	75	+ 5 Laps	10
12	(South Africa) Bill Jennings	Bill Jennings	Jennings-Porsche	71	+ 9 Laps	17
13	(South Africa) John Guthrie	Ecurie Rhodes	Cooper-Alfa Romeo	71	+ 9 Laps	19
14	(South Africa) Don Philp	Don Philp	Quodra-Climax	70	+ 10 Laps	11
15	(South Africa) Dave Wright	Dave Wright	Cooper-Climax	65	+ 15 Laps	21
Ret	(South Africa) Fanie Viljoen	G. E. Mennie	LDS-Climax	59	Engine	13
Ret	(South Africa) Bill Dunlop	Bill Dunlop	Cooper-Alfa Romeo	31	Engine	23
Ret	(South Africa) Gene Bosman	Scuderia Alfa	Lotus-Alfa Romeo	31	Accident	20
Ret	(South Africa) Clive Trundell	Clive Trundell	Cooper-Climax	27	Ignition	22
Ret	(United Kingdom) Trevor Taylor	Team Lotus	Lotus-Climax	16	Radiator	3
Ret	(United States) Masten Gregory	UDT Laystall Racing Team	Lotus-Climax	9	Brake Pipe	5
Ret	(South Africa) Ernie Pieterse	Scuderia Alfa	Heron-Alfa Romeo	7	Gearbox	9
Ret	(South Africa) Bernard Podmore	Bernard Podmore	Lotus-Ford	5	Con-rod	18
DNS	(South Africa) Bruce Johnstone	Yeoman Credit Racing Team	Cooper-Climax		Practice Accident	
WD	(Federation of Rhodesia and Nyasaland) John Love	A. H. Pillman	LDS-Porsche		Car Damaged	

== Notes ==
- Pole position: Jim Clark – 1:33.9
- Fastest Lap: Jim Clark – 1:33.1
- Doug Serrurier was also entered by Scuderia Alfa, to drive an LDS-Alfa Romeo, but did not drive this car during the event.

Previous race: 1961 Natal Grand Prix	Formula One non-championship races 1961 season	Next race: 1962 Cape Grand Prix
Previous race: 1960 VII South African Grand Prix	South African Grand Prix	Next race: 1962 South African Grand Prix
