= 1961 International Gold Cup =

- Non-championship race in the 1961 Formula One season

Race details
- Date: 23 September 1961
- Official name: VIII Gold Cup
- Location: Oulton Park, Cheshire
- Course: Permanent racing facility
- Course length: 4.4434 km (2.761 miles)
- Distance: 60 laps, 266.6 km (165.66 miles)

Pole position
Driver	(New Zealand) Bruce McLaren	Cooper-Climax
- Time: 1:44.6

Fastest lap
Driver	(United Kingdom) Stirling Moss	Ferguson-Climax
- Time: 1:46.4

Podium
First	(United Kingdom) Stirling Moss	Ferguson-Climax
Second	(Australia) Jack Brabham	Cooper-Climax
Third	(New Zealand) Bruce McLaren	Cooper-Climax

The 8th Gold Cup was a motor race, run to Formula One rules, held on 23 September 1961 at Oulton Park, England. The race was run over 60 laps of the circuit, and was won by British driver Stirling Moss in a Ferguson P99.

This is the only time a Formula One race was won by a four-wheel drive car, the damp conditions proving ideal for the car's extra traction.

== Results ==
Pos	Driver	Entrant	Constructor	Time/Retired	Grid
1	(United Kingdom) Stirling Moss	Rob Walker Racing Team	Ferguson-Climax	1.51:53.8	2
2	(Australia) Jack Brabham	Jack Brabham	Cooper-Climax	+ 46.0 s	6
3	(New Zealand) Bruce McLaren	Tommy Atkins	Cooper-Climax	+ 53.6 s	1
4	(United Kingdom) Tony Brooks	Owen Racing Organisation	BRM	+ 56.8 s	5
5	(United States) Masten Gregory	UDT-Laystall Racing Team	Lotus-Climax	58 laps	8
6	(United Kingdom) Ian Burgess	Ian Burgess	Cooper-Climax	57 laps	16
7	(United Kingdom) Tony Marsh	Tony Marsh	BRM	56 laps	9
8	(United Kingdom) Henry Taylor	UDT-Laystall Racing Team	Lotus-Climax	56 laps	12
9	(United Kingdom) Brian Naylor	JBW Car Co.	JBW-Climax	56 laps	15
10	(Germany) Wolfgang Seidel	Scuderia Colonia	Lotus-Climax	56 laps	18
11	(United Kingdom) David Piper	Gilby Engineering	Gilby-Climax	55 laps	14
12	(United Kingdom) Chris Summers	Ansty Garage	Cooper-Climax	54 laps	20
Ret	(United Kingdom) Trevor Taylor	Team Lotus	Lotus-Climax	Exhaust	13
Ret	(United Kingdom) Graham Hill	Owen Racing Organisation	BRM	Valve	3
Ret	(United Kingdom) John Surtees	Yeoman Credit Racing Team	Cooper-Climax	Magneto	7
Ret	(United Kingdom) Jim Clark	Team Lotus	Lotus-Climax	Rear suspension	4
Ret	(United Kingdom) Innes Ireland	Team Lotus	Lotus-Climax	Engine	10
Ret	(United Kingdom) Chris Ashmore	Dennis Taylor	Cooper-Climax	Gearbox	23
Ret	(United Kingdom) Roy Salvadori	Yeoman Credit Racing Team	Cooper-Climax	Gearbox	11
Ret	(France) Bernard Collomb	Bernard Collomb	Cooper-Climax	Front suspension	22
Ret	(United Kingdom) Jack Lewis	H & L Motors	Cooper-Climax	Puncture	17
Ret	(United Kingdom) Tim Parnell	Tim Parnell	Lotus-Climax	Fuel pump	21
Ret	(United Kingdom) Graham Eden	Graham Eden	Cooper-Climax	Accident	19
DNS	(United Kingdom) Jack Fairman	Emeryson Cars	Emeryson-Climax	Practiced unofficially	-
WD	(Sweden) Jo Bonnier	Porsche System Engineering	Porsche		-
WD	(United States) Dan Gurney	Porsche System Engineering	Porsche		-
WD	(United Kingdom) John Campbell-Jones	John Campbell-Jones	Cooper-Climax	Driver injured	-
WD	(Switzerland) Michael May	Scuderia Colonia	Lotus-Climax	No car	-
DNA	(France) Roger Revol	Roger Revol	BRM-Climax		-

Previous race: 1961 Flugplatzrennen	Formula One non-championship races 1961 season	Next race: 1961 Lewis-Evans Trophy
Previous race: 1960 International Gold Cup	Oulton Park International Gold Cup	Next race: 1962 International Gold Cup
