= John Campbell-Jones =

British racing driver (1930–2020)

- Born: 21 January 1930; Leatherhead, Surrey, England
- Died: 24 March 2020 (aged 90); Camden, London, England

Formula One World Championship career
- Nationality: (United Kingdom) British
- Active years: 1962–1963
- Team(s): Non-works Cooper, Lotus and Lola
- Entries: 2
- Championships: 0
- Wins: 0
- Podiums: 0
- Career points: 0
- Pole positions: 0
- Fastest laps: 0
- First entry: 1962 Belgian Grand Prix
- Last entry: 1963 British Grand Prix

Michael John Churchill Campbell-Jones (21 January 1930 – 24 March 2020) was a Formula One driver from England. He participated in two World Championship Grands Prix, debuting on 17 June 1962. He scored no championship points. He also participated in numerous non-Championship Formula One races.

After some success in sports car racing in 1958, Campbell-Jones entered Formula Two whilst entering minor Formula One races. In 1962, he joined the Emeryson team but achieved little; his one World Championship entry was in the Belgian Grand Prix, where the Emeryson's gearbox failed in practice. He raced a borrowed Lotus which he retired with gearbox failure, although he was classified 11th. However, he did achieve some minor placings in lesser Formula One races that year. In the 1962 Solitude Grand Prix (non-championship) he had an accident in practice and was badly burnt.

In 1963, Campbell-Jones moved to Tim Parnell's team which were running Lolas, but he struggled again with his single Championship entry seeing him finish 13th at the British Grand Prix. After that season, Campbell-Jones faded from the scene.

== Complete Formula One World Championship results ==
(key)

| Year | Entrant | Chassis | Engine | 1 | 2 | 3 | 4 | 5 | 6 | 7 | 8 | 9 | 10 | WDC | Pts. |
|---|---|---|---|---|---|---|---|---|---|---|---|---|---|---|---|
| 1961 | John Campbell-Jones | Cooper T51 | Climax L4 | MON | NED | BEL | FRA | GBR | GER; DNA | ITA | USA | | | NC | 0 |
| 1962 | Emeryson Cars | Lotus 18 | Climax L4 | NED | MON | BEL; 11 | FRA | GBR | GER | ITA | USA | RSA | | NC | 0 |
| 1963 | Tim Parnell | Lola Mk4 | Climax V8 | MON | BEL | NED | FRA | GBR; 13 | GER | ITA | USA | MEX | RSA | NC | 0 |
