= Roy Salvadori =

British racing driver (1922–2012)

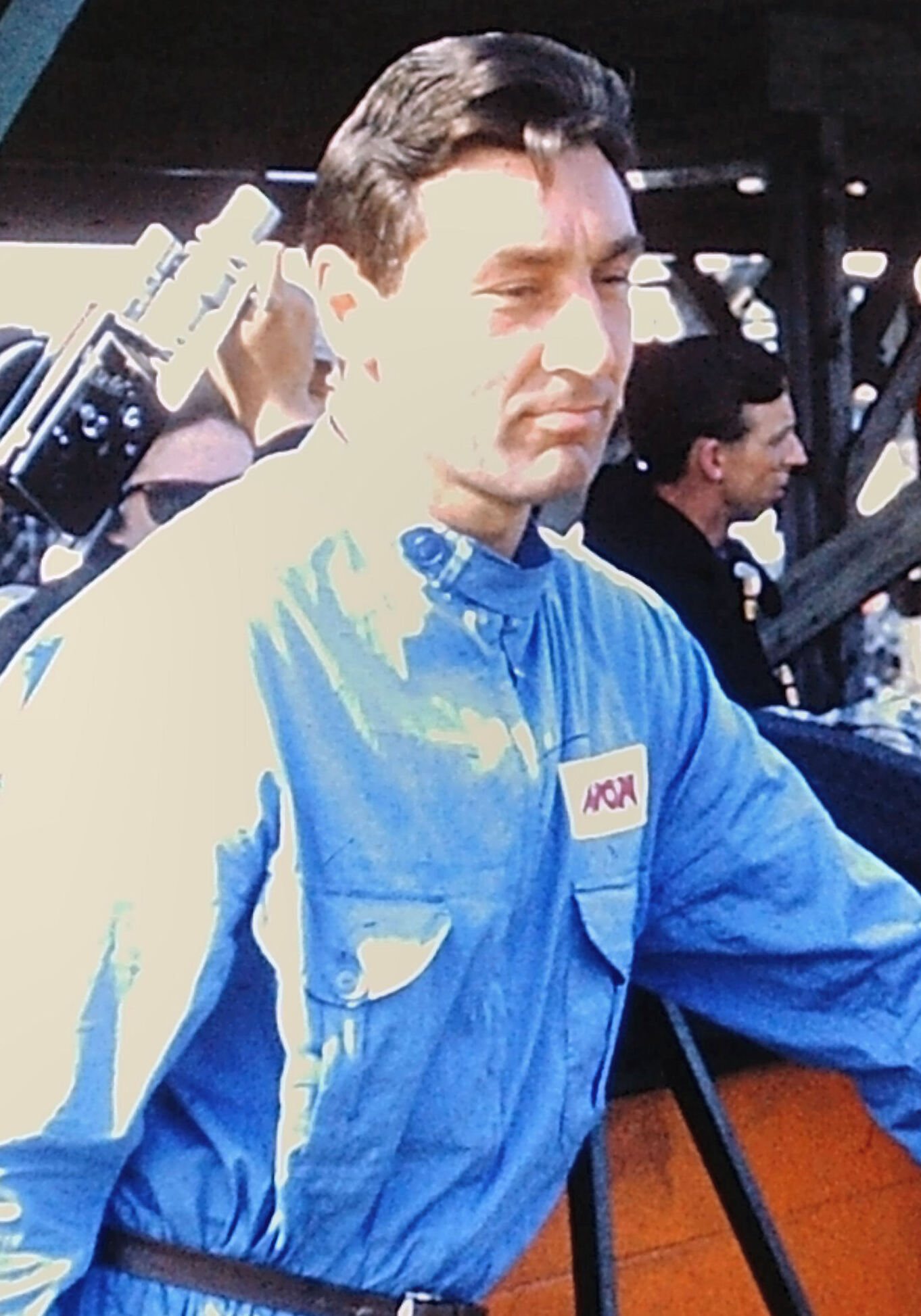
- Salvadori at the 1958 12 Hours of Sebring
- Born: Roy Francesco Salvadori; 12 May 1922; Dovercourt, Essex, England,
- Died: 3 June 2012 (aged 90); Monte Carlo, Monaco
- Spouse: Susan Hindmarsh (m. 1960)
- Relatives: Johnny Hindmarsh (father-in-law); Violette Cordery (mother-in-law)

Formula One World Championship career
- Nationality: (United Kingdom) British
- Active years: 1952–1962
- Team(s): Privateer Ferrari, Connaught, Gilby, Maserati, BRM, Vanwall, Cooper, privateer Cooper, Aston Martin, Parnell
- Entries: 50 (47 starts)
- Championships: 0
- Wins: 0
- Podiums: 2
- Career points: 19
- Pole positions: 0
- Fastest laps: 0
- First entry: 1952 British Grand Prix
- Last entry: 1962 South African Grand Prix

24 Hours of Le Mans career
- Years: 1953–1963
- Teams: Aston Martin, Border Reivers, Jaguar
- Best finish: 1st (1959)
- Class wins: 2 (1959, 1962)

Roy Francesco Salvadori (12 May 1922 – 3 June 2012) was a British racing driver and motorsport executive, who competed in Formula One from 1952 to 1962. In endurance racing, Salvadori won the 24 Hours of Le Mans in 1959 with Aston Martin.

Born in Dovercourt to parents of Italian descent, Salvadori began competing in Grand Prix motor racing after World War II. His early career successes at tracks such as Silverstone and Snetterton earned him the nickname "King of the Airfields". He graduated to Formula One by 1952 and competed regularly until 1962 for a succession of teams including Cooper, Vanwall, BRM, Aston Martin and Connaught. Also a competitor in other formulae, he won the 1959 24 Hours of Le Mans in an Aston Martin with co-driver Carroll Shelby.

In 47 starts, Salvadori achieved two F1 Championship podium finishes: third place at the 1958 British Grand Prix and second place at that year's German Grand Prix, and won non-championship races in Australia, New Zealand and England. In 1961, he was lying second in the United States Grand Prix when his Cooper's engine failed. At the end of 1962, he retired from F1, and stopped racing altogether a couple of years later to concentrate on the motor trade. He returned to the sport in 1966 to manage the Cooper-Maserati squad for two seasons, and eventually retired to Monaco.

== Racing career ==
=== Early career ===
With his ambition thwarted by World War II, Salvadori began his career in 1946, racing purely for pleasure, in minor events, in a MG and an ex-Brooklands offset Riley racer before stepping up to an ex-Tazio Nuvolari Alfa Romeo P3 in 1947. It was with this car, he raced in the 1947 Grand Prix des Frontières, where late into the race, his Alfa would remain stuck in top gear. Despite this, Salvadori still cruised home to record an impressive fifth place. He then decided to become a professional racing driver, and drove a number of different makes as his career progressed.

In the May 1951 BRDC International Trophy race at Silverstone, Salvadori had a serious accident when his Frazer Nash Le Mans Replica somersaulted two and a half times, ejecting him into the hay bales. He was in a critical condition, suffering a fractured skull and other severe injuries which left him so close to death he was given the last rites.

=== King of the Airfields ===
Salvadori knew his limitations, and realized that chasing the likes of Stirling Moss at circuits like steeply cambered, high-banked Dundrod or Pescara, with its blind bends and flat-out blinds, was futile, verging on suicidal. Though he was not alone in that, he became known as "King of the Airfields", accumulating wins at Silverstone, Snetterton and flat English airfield tracks.

Salvadori twice won the Oulton Park's International Gold Cup where there were plenty of trees to hit and a lake to plunge into, which he did once driving a Jaguar Mk.II 3.8 saloon. Nor was the Le Mans Mulsanne Straight at night a place for the careless or nervous, nevertheless he scored his most notable success there in an Aston Martin DBR1/300 in 1959.

Salvadori's association with tractor magnate David Brown and his Feltham-built Aston Martin sports cars, GTs and F1 underscored his career; he joined Brown's team in mid-1953, and would label his 1963 defeat of Ferrari's 250 GTO at Monza in its DP214 in the Inter-Europa Cup, as his favourite victory.

=== Formula One ===
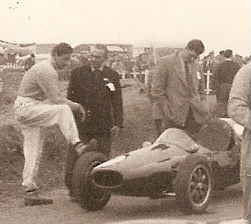
1956 Silverstone GP Formula 2 race winner Salvadori with foot on tyre of Cooper T41

Salvadori recovered sufficiently from his Silverstone accident to make his first entry into Grand Prix racing in 1952 when he drove a two-litre four cylinder Ferrari 500 in the British Grand Prix for G. Caprara, finishing eighth, three laps down. He would continue to race the Ferrari, winning the Joe Fry Memorial Trophy. For the 1953 season, Salvadori joined the Connaught team and competed in five Grands Prix with the Connaught "A type" but retired from all of them. However, he did secured a number of non-championship victories during the season.

Between 1954 and 1956, Salvadori drove a Maserati 250F in Formula One for Syd Greene's Gilby Engineering team, taking a numerous good results in predominantly non-championship F1 races, with one entry for Officine Alfieri Maserati in the 1954 Swiss Grand Prix where he did not start and the car was driven by Sergio Mantovani. It was in the 1956 RAC British Grand Prix at Silverstone when only a similarly 250F mounted Moss shaded him and a possible victory was lost to a fuel line problem, marked him out as a potential top-level driver. However, he remained particularly active in domestic motor sport and in sports cars for Aston Martin.

Following his Championship debut in 1952, Salvadori would experience retirement after retirement. Out of the ten races contested between 1953 and 1956, he would retire early in every single one of them. But this all changed in 1957, when he signed with Cooper achieving only one fifth place at RAC British Grand Prix. However, 1958 (as teammate to Jack Brabham) was his most successful season, finishing fourth in the World Drivers' Championship for Cooper, behind Mike Hawthorn, Stirling Moss and Tony Brooks. Over the course of the season, he would earn two podium finishes, including a second place in the German Grand Prix. However he was not retained by Cooper for 1959 (when Brabham would win the first of his titles) but drove a privately entered Cooper, as well as the works Aston Martin, in which he achieved two sixth-place finishes. The Aston Martin was a traditional front engined car, which was soon outclassed by the Cooper rear engined concept. He did, however, win the London Trophy at Crystal Palace with a Formula Two Cooper. The Aston Martin team continued into 1960 but again without success and Salvadori also continued with the privately entered Cooper.

For 1961, Salvadori moved to Reg Parnell's Yeoman Credit Racing team as partner to John Surtees, competing in five Grands Prix and achieving three sixth-place finishes with the team's 1.5-litre Cooper T53-Climax. The Cooper now had strong competition in the form of Colin Chapman's Lotus cars, but Salvadori was catching Innes Ireland for the lead in the United States Grand Prix at Watkins Glen when the engine failed. He continued with Parnell for 1962, now under the Bowmaker Racing Team name with the Lola Mk4-Climax, but eight attempts yielded seven retirements and one failure to start (as John Surtees took the car). 1962 was Salvadori's last season in Formula One. The season had begun with a nasty accident in a Cooper during qualifying for the Warwick Farm '100' in Australia, which left him with a temporary facial paralysis.

=== Sports cars ===
Throughout his Formula One career, Salvadori continued to participate in many other classes, particularly within the United Kingdom and became very well-known domestically as a result. Throughout 1951 and 1952 seasons, while taking part in sportscar races throughout England, he would become a regular on the podium and would win his first race at the BARC Goodwood in 1952. He would follow this victory up with another at Snetterton and Goodwood later on in the season. He would then sweep all of the events as part of the National meeting at Thruxton. 1953 would see Salvadori earn more podium finishes with a few victories. However, his first attempt at the 24 Hours of Le Mans, driving a works Aston Martin would not fare well. Co-driving with George Abecassis, the clutch failure would lead to the pair retiring early. He impressed with his aggressive press-on attitude, when he finished second in the Internationales ADAC-1000 km Rennen Weltmeisterschaftslauf Nürburgring in an Ecurie Ecosse Jaguar C-Type, shared with Ian Stewart

Ever since he started racing sportscars in the upper levels during the 1950s, he was usually a sure bet to finish in the top five, whether it was in national or international races. However, in 1959, he would achieve a run of success of which even the best would find themselves envious. Although he only finished one race in the year to March, over the next three months Salvadori would go on an incredible run of success. The run started with a second place in the British Empire Trophy race but followed that with two straight victories in the Aintree 200 and an International race at Silverstone. And then, a pair of second-place finishes and another victory, this time at the National Open race at Crystal Palace in the middle of May. It was on to the Circuit de la Sarthe for the 24 Hours of Le Mans.

=== 1959 24 Hours of Le Mans ===
Salvadori was entered in the race by David Brown Racing Dept. in an Aston Martin DBR1/300, partnered by the same co-driver he had had at the 12 Hours of Sebring earlier on in the year, Texan Carroll Shelby. Attrition would be a constant participant and the field would be down to just 13 cars, heading the surviving cars was that of Salvadori and Shelby. The Englishman would bring the car across the finish line giving himself and Brown the Le Mans victory each had been longing for many years. This would be the high point of his sports car career, especially as Shelby was afflicted by dysentery, therefore Salvadori did the lion's share of the driving. Before the end of the season, he would score four more victories to make it his best season.

Salvadori followed the '59 season with another successful season in 1960, scoring five victories, including a run of four wins in five races. While at Le Mans, he allowed his co-driver, Jim Clark sufficient scope to express himself, but provided enough wise counsel for the pairing to finish third in the Border Reivers' DBR1. 1961 would see him take two victories at Crystal Palace on the same day, plus a string of other podium finishes He returned to the winning ways at the Circuit de la Sarthe in 1962, when he shared a Jaguar E-Type with Briggs Cunningham. The pair finished fourth overall, but won their class. A year later, he spun on oil dropped by Bruce McLaren's Aston Martin DP214 during the early stages of the race and flipped his E-Type onto its roof; the car then burst into flames. Jean-Pierre Manzon in his Aerodjet LM6 hit Salvadori and stopped in the middle of the track. Christian Heins was unable to avoid the wreckage; his car swerved out of control, hit another car, spun into a lamp car, and exploded in flames. Salvadori and Manzon were both injured; Heins died instantly. The accident ultimately led to Salvadori retiring from racing in early 1965, after finished second in the Whitsun Trophy race at Goodwood, abroad a Ford GT40. His last sportscar victory came the season before in the Scott-Brown Memorial at Snetterton.

Salvadori returned to Formula One as a team manager for the Cooper racing team in 1966 and 1967. However, after a disagreement with the team, he left and focussed on his own business. Away from the track, he was involved with a car dealership in Surrey between 1968-1969. Salvadori was also involved in the early stages of the Ford GT40 project but resigned, when the machine's handling appeared problematic, without accepting a fee for his services.

Salvadori retired to Monaco in the late 1960s. He died in Monaco on 3 June 2012 at the age of 90, three weeks after the death of his co-driver at Le Mans in 1959, Carroll Shelby.

== Family life ==
Salvadori married Susan Hindmarsh, one of the daughters of racing driver, long distance record breaker and 'round the world' driver Violette Cordery and her husband, the racing driver and aviator John Stuart Hindmarsh.

== Racing record ==
=== Career highlights ===
Season	Series	Position	Team	Car
1952	Joe Fry Memorial Trophy	**1st**	G, Caprara	Ferrari 500
1952	Goodwood Nine Hours	3rd	G. Caprara	Ferrari 225 S
1952	Charterhall International	3rd	B. Baird	Ferrari 225 S
1953	WECC Trophy	**1st**	Connaught Engineering	Connaught-Les Francis Type A
1953	Madgwick Cup	**1st**	Connaught Engineering	Connaught-Les Francis Type A
1953	Lavant Cup	2nd	Connaught Engineering	Connaught-Les Francis Type A
1953	AMOC Trophy	2nd		Ferrari
1953	Daily Express BRDC International Trophy	2nd	Connaught Engineering	Connaught-Les Francis Type A
1953	Crystal Palace Trophy	2nd	Connaught Engineering	Connaught-Les Francis Type A
1953	Internationales ADAC-1000 km Rennen Weltmeisterschaftslauf Nürburgring	2nd	Ecurie Ecosse	Jaguar C-Type
1953	Newcastle Journal Trophy	3rd	Connaught Engineering	Connaught-Les Francis Type A
1954	Curtis Trophy	**1st**	Gilby Engineering	Maserati 250F
1954	WECC Trophy	**1st**	Gilby Engineering	Maserati 250F
1954	British Empire Trophy	2nd	Gilby Engineering	Maserati A6GCS
1954	Lavant Cup	2nd	Gilby Engineering	Maserati 250F
1954	Chichester Cup	2nd	Gilby Engineering	Maserati 250F
1954	August Cup	2nd	Gilby Engineering	Maserati 250F
1954	Penya Rhin Grand Prix	2nd	Ecurie Ecosse	Jaguar C-Type
1954	Whitsuntide Race	3rd		Maserati 250F
1954	Grand Prix de Rouen-les-Essarts	3rd	Gilby Engineering	Maserati 250F
1954	Goodwood Trophy	3rd	Gilby Engineering	Maserati 250F
1955	Glover Trophy	**1st**	Gilby Engineering	Maserati 250F
1955	Lavant Cup	**1st**	John Young	Connaught-Les Francis Type A
1955	WHDCC Trophy	**1st**		Maserati 250F
1955	WECC Trophy	**1st**		Maserati 250F
1955	Curtis Trophy	**1st**	Gilby Engineering	Maserati 250F
1955	Daily Telegraph Trophy	**1st**	Gilby Engineering	Maserati 250F
1955	Chichester Cup	2nd		Maserati 250F
1955	BRDC International Trophy	2nd	Gilby Engineering	Maserati 250F
1955	Silverstone International	2nd	Aston Martin	Aston Martin DB3S
1955	Snetterton International	2nd	Gilby Eng.	Maserati 250F
1955	BARC Trophy	2nd		Maserati 250F
1955	London Trophy	3rd	Gilby Engineering	Maserati 250F
1955	Aintree International	3rd	Roy Salvadori	Aston Martin DB3S
1956	Circuito do Porto [S1.5]	**1st**	Cooper Car Company	Cooper-Climax T39
1956	RAC British F2 Grand Prix	**1st**	Cooper Car Co.	Cooper-Climax T41
1956	Vanwall Trophy	**1st**	Gilby Engineering	Maserati 250F
1956	Bank Holiday F2 Race	**1st**	Cooper Car Co.	Cooper-Climax T41
1956	Sussex Trophy	**1st**	Cooper Car Co.	Cooper-Climax T41
1956	International Gold Cup	**1st**	Cooper Car Co.	Cooper-Climax T41
1956	Glover Trophy	2nd	Gilby Engineering	Maserati 250F
1956	British Empire Trophy	3rd	Cooper	Cooper-Climax T39
1956	Rheinland-Pfalz Preis Nürburgring	3rd	Cooper Car Co.	Cooper-Climax T39
1956	Grand Prix de Caen	3rd	Gilby Engineering	Maserati 250F
1957	Woodcote Cup	**1st**	Cooper Car Co.	Cooper-Climax T43
1957	British Empire Trophy	2nd	D. Brown (Aston Martin) Ltd.	Aston Martin DBR1
1957	Sussex Trophy	2nd	Aston Martin	Aston Martin DBR1
1957	Grand Prix de Spa	2nd	Aston Martin	Aston Martin DBR1
1957	London Trophy	2nd	Cooper Car Co.	Cooper-Climax T43
1957	Aintree International	2nd	Aston Martin	Aston Martin DBR1
1957	Grand Prix de Caen	2nd		Cooper-Climax T43
1957	FIA Formula One World Championship	18th	Owen Racing Organisation; Vandervell Products; Cooper Car Company	BRM P25; Vanwall VW5; Cooper-Climax T43
1958	Aintree 200	2nd	David Brown	Aston Martin DBR2
1958	Daily Express BRDC International Trophy	2nd	Cooper Car Co.	Cooper-Climax T45
1958	Großer Preis von Deutschland	2nd	Cooper Car Company	Cooper-Climax T45
1958	RAC Tourist Trophy	2nd	David Brown Ltd.	Aston Martin DBR1/300
1958	Glover Trophy	3rd		Cooper-Climax T45
1958	RAC British Grand Prix	3rd	Cooper Car Company	Cooper-Climax T45
1958	FIA Formula One World Championship	4th	Cooper Car Company	Cooper-Climax T45
1958	USAC Road Racing Championship	14th	Cooper Car Company	Cooper-Climax T45
1959	Aintree 200	**1st**	John Coombs	Cooper-Maserati Monaco T49
1959	London Trophy	**1st**	High Efficiency Motors	Cooper-Climax T43
1959	1959 24 Hours of Le Mans	**1st**	David Brown Racing Dept.	Aston Martin DBR1/300
1959	Lavant Cup	2nd	High Efficiency Motors	Cooper-Climax T43
1959	Fordwater Trophy for Saloon Cars	2nd	John Coombs Racing Organisation	Jaguar 3.4
1959	Daily Express BRDC International Trophy	2nd	David Brown Corporation	Aston Martin DBR4/250
1959	British Empire Trophy	2nd	John Coombs	Cooper-Maserati Monaco T49
1959	John Davy Trophy	2nd	High Efficiency Motors	Cooper-Climax T43
1959	BRSCC British Saloon Car Championship	9th	John Coombs Racing Organisation	Jaguar 3.4
1960	Sussex Trophy	**1st**	John Coombs	Cooper-Maserati Monaco T49
1960	Aintree 200	**1st**	John Coombs	Cooper-Maserati Monaco T49
1960	Lancashire & Cheshire C.C. F2	**1st**	High Efficiency Motors	Cooper-Climax T51
1960	Silverstone International – Sports Cars	**1st**	John Coombs	Cooper-Maserati Monaco T49
1960	Brands Hatch International	**1st**	J. Coombs	Cooper-Climax Monaco T49
1960	Fordwater Trophy	2nd	John Coombs Racing Organisation	Jaguar Mk II
1960	RAC Tourist Trophy	2nd	Essex Racing Team	Aston Martin DB4 GT
1960	Oulton Park Trophy	3rd	High Efficiency Motors	Cooper-Climax T51
1960	1960 24 Hours of Le Mans	3rd	Border Reivers	Aston Martin DBR1/300
1960	Lavant Cup	3rd	High Efficiency Motors	Cooper-Climax T51
1960	International Formula Libre Grand Prix	3rd	John Coombs	Cooper-Climax Monaco T49
1961	Longford Trophy	**1st**	Ecurie Vitesse	Cooper-Climax T51
1961	Lombank Trophy	**1st**	J. Ogier	Aston Martin DB4 GT
1961	London Trophy	**1st**	Yeoman Credit Racing Team	Cooper-Climax T53
1961	Silverstone International – Sports Car	2nd	John Coombs Racing Organisation	Cooper-Climax Monaco T49
1961	Peco Trophy	2nd	John Coombs	Jaguar E-Type
1961	Scott-Brown Memorial Trophy	2nd	John Coombs	Jaguar E-Type
1961	Molyslip Trophy	2nd		Jaguar E-Type
1961	Glover Trophy	3rd	Yeoman Credit Racing Team	Cooper-Climax T53
1961	B.R.D.C. International Trophy	3rd	Yeoman Credit Racing Team	Cooper-Climax T53
1961	Peco Trophy	3rd	John Coombs	Jaguar E-Type
1961	RAC Tourist Trophy	3rd	Essex Racing Team	Aston Martin DB4 GT Zagato
1961	Grote Prijs van Danske	3rd	Yeoman Credit Racing Team	Cooper-Climax T53
1961	BRSCC British Saloon Car Championship	5th	John Coombs	Jaguar Mk II 3.8
1961	Inter-Continental Championship	6th	Yeoman Credit Racing Team	Cooper-Climax T53
1961	FIA Formula World Championship	17th	Yeoman Credit Racing Team	Cooper-Climax T53
1962	Lavant Cup	2nd		Lola-Climax T4
1962	Crystal Palace Trophy	2nd		Lola-Climax T4
1962	Kanonloppet	2nd	Bowmaker Racing Team	Lola-Climax T4
1962	Peco Trophy	2nd	John Coombs	Ferrari 250 GTO
1963	Lavant Cup	**1st**		Cooper-Climax Monaco T61
1963	Aintree 200	**1st**	C. T. Atkins	Cooper-Climax Monaco T61
1963	Silverstone International – Sports Cars	**1st**	C. T. Atkins	Cooper-Climax Monaco T61
1963	The Motors 6 Hours	**1st**	Tommy Atkins	Jaguar Mk II 3.8
1963	Coppa Inter-Europa (+2.0)	**1st**	David Brown/Aston Martin Lagonda	Aston Martin DP214
1963	St. Mary's Trophy	2nd	Tommy Atkins	Jaguar Mk II 3.8
1963	Norbury Trophy	2nd	Tommy Atkins	Jaguar Mk II 3.8
1963	Guards Trophy	2nd	C. T. Atkins	Cooper-Climax Monaco T61
1963	Sussex Trophy	3rd	Tommy Atkins	Jaguar E-Type
1963	Grovewood Trophy	3rd	C. T. Atkins	Jaguar E-Type Lightweight
1963	The Slip Molyslip Trophy	3rd	Tommy Atkins	Jaguar Mk II 3.8
1963	RAC Tourist Trophy	3rd	C. T. Atkins	Jaguar E-Type Lightweight
1963	BRSCC British Saloon Car Championship	4th	Tommy Atkins	Jaguar Mk II 3.8
1964	Whitsun Trophy	**1st**	Tommy Atkins	Cooper-Maserati
1964	Coppa Inter-Europa	2nd	Maranello Concessionaires	Ferrari 250 LM
1965	Whitsun Trophy	2nd	F. English Ltd.	Ford GT40

=== Complete Formula One World Championship results ===
(key)

Year	Entrant	Chassis	Engine	1	2	3	4	5	6	7	8	9	10	11	WDC	Pts.
1952	G. Caprara	Ferrari 500	Ferrari I4	SUI	500	BEL	FRA	GBR; 8	GER	NED	ITA				NC	0
1953	Connaught Engineering	Connaught Type A	Lea-Francis I4	ARG	500	NED; Ret	BEL	FRA; Ret	GBR; Ret	GER; Ret	SUI	ITA; Ret			NC	0
1954	Gilby Engineering Ltd.	Maserati 250F	Maserati I6	ARG	500	BEL	FRA; Ret	GBR; Ret	GER		ITA	ESP			NC	0
1954	Officine Alfieri Maserati	Maserati 250F	Maserati I6							SUI; DNS†					NC	0
1955	Gilby Engineering Ltd.	Maserati 250F	Maserati I6	ARG	MON	500	BEL	GER	GBR; Ret	ITA					NC	0
1956	Gilby Engineering Ltd.	Maserati 250F	Maserati I6	ARG	MON	500	BEL	FRA	GBR; Ret	GER; Ret	ITA; 11				NC	0
1957	Owen Racing Organisation	BRM P25	BRM I4	ARG	MON; DNQ	500									19th	2
1957	Vandervell Products Ltd.	Vanwall	Vanwall I4				FRA; Ret								19th	2
1957	Cooper Car Company	Cooper T43	Climax I4					GBR; 5		PES; Ret	ITA				19th	2
1957	Cooper Car Company	Cooper T43 (F2)	Climax I4						GER; Ret						19th	2
1958	Cooper Car Company	Cooper T45	Climax I4	ARG	MON; Ret			BEL; 8	FRA; 11	GBR; 3	GER; 2	POR; 9	ITA; 5	MOR; 7	4th	15
1958	Cooper Car Company	Cooper T44	Climax I4			NED; 4	500								4th	15
1959	High Efficiency Motors	Cooper T45	Maserati I6	MON; 6	500		FRA; Ret					USA; Ret			NC	0
1959	David Brown Corporation	Aston Martin DBR4/250	Aston Martin I6			NED; Ret		GBR; 6	GER	POR; 6	ITA; Ret				NC	0
1960	High Efficiency Motors	Cooper T51	Climax I4	ARG	MON; Ret	500							USA; 8		NC	0
1960	David Brown Corporation	Aston Martin DBR4/250	Aston Martin I6				NED; DNS	BEL	FRA						NC	0
1960	David Brown Corporation	Aston Martin DBR5/250	Aston Martin I6							GBR; Ret	POR	ITA			NC	0
1961	Yeoman Credit Racing Team	Cooper T53	Climax I4	MON	NED	BEL	FRA; 8	GBR; 6	GER; 10	ITA; 6	USA; Ret				17th	2
1962	Bowmaker-Yeoman Racing Team	Lola Mk4	Climax V8	NED; Ret	MON; Ret	BEL	FRA; Ret	GBR; Ret	GER; Ret	ITA; Ret	USA; DNS	RSA; Ret			NC	0

† Car driven, in the race, by Sergio Mantovani.

=== Non-championship results ===
(key)

Year	Entrant	Chassis	Engine	1	2	3	4	5	6	7	8	9	10	11	12	13	14	15	16	17	18	19	20	21	22	23	24	25	26	27	28	29	30	31	32	33	34	35
1952	Giovanni Caprara	Ferrari 166	Ferrari 2.0 V12	RIO	SYR	VAL	RIC	LAV	PAU	IBS	MAR	AST	INT	ELÄ	NAP	EIF	PAR	ALB	FRO	ULS	MNZ	LAC	ESS	MAR	SAB	CAE	DMT; Ret	COM	NAT	BAU								
1952	Giovanni Caprara	Ferrari 500	Ferrari 2.0 L4																															MAD; 7	AVU	JOE; 1	NEW	RIO
1952	Leslie Hawthorn	Cooper T20	Bristol BS1 2.0 L6																												MOD; Ret	CAD	SKA					
1953	Connaught Engineering	Connaught Type A	Lea-Francis 2.0 L4	SYR	PAU	**LAV**; 2	AST	BOR	INT; 2	ELÄ	NAP	ULS; Ret	WIN	FRO	COR; DNA	SNE; Ret	EIF	ALB	PRI	ESS; 4	MID	ROU	CRY; 2	AVU		LAC	BRI	CHE	SAB	LON	MOD; Ret	**MAD**; 1	JOE; Ret	CUR; Ret	NEW; 2	CAD	RED	SKA
1953	Roy Salvadori	Frazer Nash FN48	Bristol BS 2.0 L6																						USF; 7													
1954	Gilby Engineering	Maserati 250F	Maserati 250F1 2.5 L6	SYR	PAU	**LAV**; 2	BOR	INT; 10	BAR	**CUR**; 1	ROM	FRO	COR	BRC; 2	CRY; DNA	ROU; 3	CAE	AUG; 2	COR	OUL; Ret	RED; DNA	PES	JOE; DNA	CAD	BER	GOO; 3	DTT; 7											
1955	Gilby Engineering	Maserati 250F	Maserati 250F1 2.5 L6	BUE	VLN	PAU	GLV; 1	BOR	**INT**; 2	NAP	ALB	**CUR**; 1	CRN	LON; 3	DRT	RDX; 5	DTT; 1	OUL; 5	AVO; 4	SYR; Ret																		
1956	Gilby Engineering	Maserati 250F	Maserati 250F1 2.5 L6	BUE	GLV; 2	SYR	AIN	INT; 9	NAP		**VNW**; 1	**CAE**; 3	BRH; 3																									
1956	High Efficiency Motors	Connaught Type A	Lea-Francis 2.0 L4							100; 4																												
1957	Owen Racing Organisation	BRM P25	BRM 2.5 L4	BUE	SYR	GLV; Ret	NAP																															
1957	Vandervell Products	Vanwall VW 7	Vanwall 254 2.5 L4					RMS; 5																														
1957	Cooper Car Company	Cooper T43	Climax FPF 2.5 L4						CAE; 2	INT; 8	MOD	MOR; Ret																										
1958	Cooper Car Company	Cooper T45	Climax FPF 2.0 L4	BUE	GLV; 3	SYR	AIN; 4	**INT**; 2																														
1959	High Efficiency Motors	Cooper T45	Maserati 250S 2.5 L6	GLV; 8	AIN; Ret		OUL; 4	SIL; Ret																														
1959	David Brown Corporation	Aston Martin DBR4/250	Aston Martin RB6 2.5 L6			INT; 2																																
1960	High Efficiency Motors	Cooper T51	Climax FPF 2.5 L4	GLV; Ret		SIL; Ret	LOM; 4	OUL; Ret|																														
1960	David Brown Corporation	Aston Martin DBR4/250	Aston Martin RB6 2.5 L6		**INT**; Ret																																	
1961	Yeoman Credit Racing	Cooper T53P	Climax FPF 1.5 L4	LOM	GLV; 3	PAU	BRX; NC	VIE	AIN; 8	SYR; 5	NAP; 7	**LON**; 1	SIL; 4	SOL	KAN; 4	DAN; 3	MOD; Ret	FLG; Ret	OUL; Ret	LEW	VAL	RAN	NAT	RSA														
1962	Bowmaker Racing	Cooper T56	Climax FPF 1.5 L4	CAP	BRX; NC	LOM; Ret																																
1962	Bowmaker Racing	Lola Mk4	Climax FWMV 1.5 V8				LAV; 2	GLV; 4	PAU	AIN; Ret	INT; Ret	NAP	MAL	**CLP**; 2	RMS; 6	SOL	KAN; 2	MED	DAN; NC	OUL; Ret	MEX; Ret	RAN	NAT															

=== Complete British Saloon Car Championship results ===
(key) (Races in bold indicate pole position; races in italics indicate fastest lap.)

Year	Team	Car	Class	1	2	3	4	5	6	7	8	9	10	11	DC	Pts	Class
1959	John Coombs	Jaguar 3.4-Litre	D	**GOO**; 2	AIN; 2	SIL; 2	GOO	SNE	BRH	BRH					NC	0	NC
1960	John Coombs	Jaguar Mk II 3.8	+2600cc	BRH	SNE	MAL	OUL	SNE	BRH; 1*	BRH	BRH				NC*	0*	
1961	John Coombs	Jaguar Mk II 3.8	D	SNE; Ret	GOO; Ret	AIN; 1	SIL; Ret	**CRY**; 1	**SIL**; Ret	**BRH**; 2	OUL; 1	SNE; 2			5th	37	**2nd**
1962	John Coombs	Jaguar Mk II 3.8	D	SNE; 4	GOO; 2	AIN; 2	SIL; Ret	**CRY**; 1	AIN	**BRH**; 3	OUL; DNS				9th	28	4th
1963	Tommy Atkins	Jaguar Mk II 3.8	D	SNE; 1	OUL; DSQ	GOO; 2	AIN; 2	SIL; 2	CRY; 2	SIL	BRH; 3				4th	38	**2nd**
1963	Alan Brown Racing Ltd	Ford Galaxie	D									**BRH**; 12	OUL; 7	SNE	4th	38	**2nd**

- Car over 1000cc - Not eligible for points.

=== Complete 24 Hours of Le Mans results ===
Year	Team	Co-Drivers	Car	Class	Laps	Pos.	Class Pos.
1953	(United Kingdom) Aston Martin Ltd.	(United Kingdom) George Abecassis	Aston Martin DB3S	S3.0	72	DNF; Clutch	
1954	(United Kingdom) David Brown	(United Kingdom) Reg Parnell	Aston Martin DB3S	S5.0	222	DNF; Head gasket	
1955	(United Kingdom) Aston Martin Ltd.	(United Kingdom) Peter Walker	Aston Martin DB3S	S3.0	105	DNF; Engine	
1956	(United Kingdom) David Brown	(United Kingdom) Peter Walker	Aston Martin DB3S	S3.0	175	DNF; Accident	
1957	(United Kingdom) D. Brown	(United Kingdom) Les Leston	Aston Martin DBR1/300	S3.0	112	DNF; Oil pipe	
1958	(United Kingdom) David Brown Racing Dept.	(United Kingdom) Stuart Lewis-Evans	Aston Martin DBR1/300	S3.0	49	DNF; Accident	
1959	(United Kingdom) David Brown Racing Dept.	(United States) Carroll Shelby	Aston Martin DBR1/300	S3.0	323	**1st**	**1st**
1960	(United Kingdom) Border Reivers	(United Kingdom) Jim Clark	Aston Martin DBR1/300	S3.0	306	3rd	3rd
1961	(United Kingdom) Essex Racing Team	(South Africa) Tony Maggs	Aston Martin DBR1/300	S3.0	243	DNF; Fuel leak	
1962	(United States) Briggs Cunningham	(United States) Briggs Cunningham	Jaguar E-Type	GT4.0	310	4th	**1st**
1963	(United States) Briggs S. Cunningham	(United States) Paul Richards	Jaguar E-Type Lightweight	GT+3.0	40	DNF; Accident => fire	

=== Complete 12 Hours of Sebring results ===
Year	Team	Co-Drivers	Car	Class	Laps	Pos.	Class Pos.
1954	(United Kingdom) Aston Martin Ltd.	(United Kingdom) Reg Parnell	Aston Martin DB3S	S3.0	24	DNF; Engine	
1956	(United Kingdom) David Brown & Sons, Ltd.	(United States) Carroll Shelby	Aston Martin DB3S	S3.0	187	4th	**1st**
1957	(Italy) Maserati Factory	(United States) Carroll Shelby	Maserati 250S	S3.0	68	DISQ; Illegal refuel	
1958	(United Kingdom) David Brown	(United States) Carroll Shelby	Aston Martin DBR1/300	S3.0	62	DNF; Transmission	
1959	(United Kingdom) David Brown-Aston Martin	(United States) Carroll Shelby	Aston Martin DBR1/300	S3.0	32	DNF; Gear level	

=== Complete 24 Hours of Daytona results ===
Year	Team	Co-Drivers	Car	Class	Laps	Pos.	Class Pos.
1964	(United Kingdom) Dawnay Racing	(United Kingdom) Mike Salmon	Aston Martin DP214	GT+2.0	34	DNF (Engine)	

=== Complete 12 Hours of Reims results ===
Year	Team	Co-Drivers	Car	Class	Laps	Pos.	Class Pos.
1953		(United Kingdom) Tony Crook	Frazer Nash Le Mans Replica	S2.0		started result unknown	
1954		(United Kingdom) Cliff Davis	Maserati A6GCS			DNS; Engine	

=== Complete 12 Hours of Casablanca results ===
Year	Team	Co-Drivers	Car	Class	Pos.	Class Pos.
1953	(France) "Mike Sparken"	(France) "Mike Sparken"	Aston Martin DB3	S+2.0	4th	3rd

Sporting positions
Preceded by Olivier Gendebien; Phil Hill	Winner of the 24 Hours of Le Mans; 1959; With: Carroll Shelby	Succeeded by Olivier Gendebien; Paul Frère
