= Glover Trophy =

The Glover Trophy was a motor racing trophy awarded at various events at Goodwood Circuit, West Sussex between 1950 and 1963.

In the 1962 race, Stirling Moss, who had won the race on two previous occasions and was considered one of the world's best racing drivers at the time, crashed at St Mary's corner on the 37th lap. The accident left him in a coma for several weeks and ended his career. The damaged helmet he was wearing at the time is currently on display as part of the Donington Grand Prix Collection.

In recent years the title has been revived as a historic racing event, forming a central part of the annual Goodwood Revival meeting.

== Winners ==
Year	Race	Winner	Car	Report
1950	500 International Trophy Race	(United Kingdom) 'Curly' Dryden	Cooper	Report
1951	500 International Trophy Race	(United Kingdom) Ken Gregory	Kieft	Report
1952	500 International Trophy Race	(United Kingdom) Bob Gerard	Cooper	Report
1953	Richmond Formula Libre Race	(United Kingdom) Ken Wharton	BRM P15	Report
1954	Richmond Formula Libre Race	(United Kingdom) Reg Parnell	Ferrari 500	Report
1955	Richmond Formula 1 Race	(United Kingdom) Roy Salvadori	Maserati 250F	Report
1956	Richmond Formula 1 Race	(United Kingdom) Stirling Moss	Maserati 250F	Report
1957	Richmond Formula 1 Race	(United Kingdom) Stuart Lewis-Evans	Connaught B-Alta	Report
1958	Goodwood International 100	(United Kingdom) Mike Hawthorn	Ferrari 246	Report
1959	Goodwood International 100	(United Kingdom) Stirling Moss	Cooper T51-Climax	Report
1960	Goodwood International 100	(United Kingdom) Innes Ireland	Lotus 18-Climax	Report
1961	Goodwood International 100	(United Kingdom) John Surtees	Cooper T53-Climax	Report
1962	Goodwood International 100	(United Kingdom) Graham Hill	BRM P57	Report
1963	Goodwood International 100	(United Kingdom) Innes Ireland	Lotus 24-BRM	Report
