= Innes Ireland =

British racing driver (1930–1993)

Lieutenant Innes Ireland
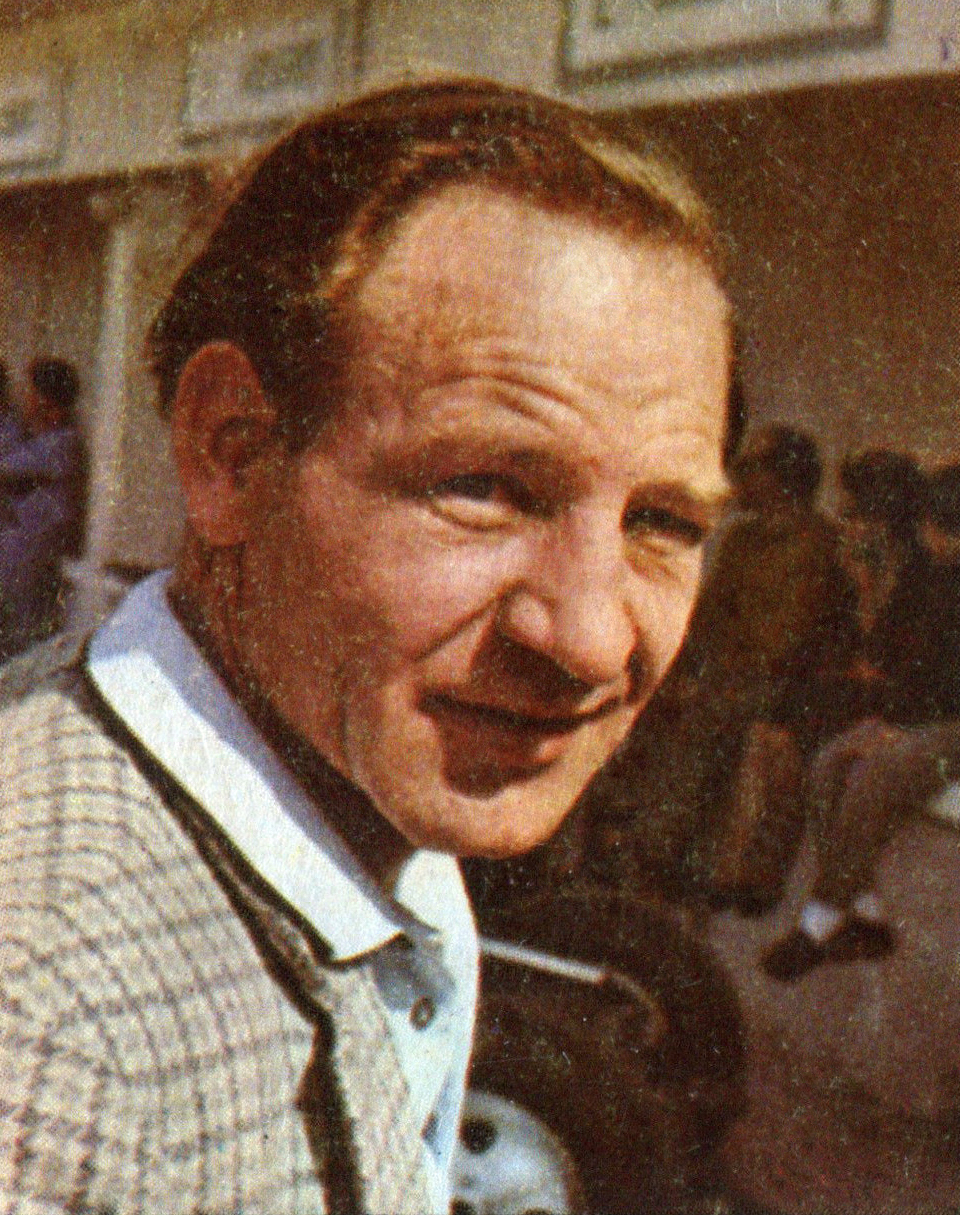
- Ireland in 1966
- Born: Robert McGregor Innes Ireland; 12 June 1930; Mytholmroyd, West Riding of Yorkshire, England
- Died: 22 October 1993 (aged 63); Reading, Berkshire, England
- Spouses: Norma Thomas (m. 1954; div. 1967) Edna Humphries (m. 1967; div. 1972) Jean Mander (m. 1993)
- Children: 3

Formula One World Championship career
- Nationality: (United Kingdom) British
- Active years: 1959–1966
- Team(s): Lotus, BRP, Parnell, White
- Entries: 53 (50 starts)
- Championships: 0
- Wins: 1
- Podiums: 4
- Career points: 47
- Pole positions: 0
- Fastest laps: 1
- First entry: 1959 Dutch Grand Prix
- First win: 1961 United States Grand Prix
- Last entry: 1966 Mexican Grand Prix

24 Hours of Le Mans career
- Years: 1958–1960, 1962–1966
- Teams: Lotus, Ecurie Ecosse, BRP, Aston Martin, Ferrari, Ford
- Best finish: 6th (1964)
- Class wins: 0
- Military career
- Allegiance: United Kingdom
- Branch: British Army
- Service years: 1953–1958
- Rank: Lieutenant
- Commands: Territorial Army (1955–1958); Parachute Regiment (1953–1954); King's Own Scottish Borderers (1953)

Robert McGregor Innes Ireland (12 June 1930 – 22 October 1993) was a British racing driver and journalist, who competed in Formula One from 1959 to 1966. Ireland won the 1961 United States Grand Prix with Lotus.

Born in Mytholmroyd and raised in Scotland, Ireland initially served in the British Army, reaching the rank of lieutenant in 1955. Ireland competed in Formula One for Lotus, BRP, Reg Parnell Racing and Bernard White Racing, winning the United States Grand Prix in 1961 with the former, as well as finishing fourth in the 1960 World Drivers' Championship and taking victories at eight non-championship races. He entered eight editions of the 24 Hours of Le Mans from 1958 to 1966, and was a race-winner in the British Saloon Car Championship.

Upon retiring from motor racing, Ireland started a career as a journalist in the late-1980s for ESPN, later working with automobile magazines Road & Track and Autocar. He was the president of the British Racing Drivers' Club from 1992 until his death the following year.

== Early life ==
Ireland was born 12 June 1930 in Mytholmroyd, West Riding of Yorkshire, England, the son of a Scottish veterinary surgeon. His family returned to Kirkcudbright, Dumfries and Galloway, Scotland during his youth, and he trained as an engineer with Rolls-Royce, first in Glasgow and later in London. Commissioned as a second lieutenant in the King's Own Scottish Borderers, he served with the Parachute Regiment in the Suez Canal Zone during 1953 and 1954. In 1955 he transferred to the Territorial Army and was promoted to lieutenant, and in 1958 he was placed on the Reserve of Officers.

== Racing career ==
Ireland began racing a Riley 9 in 1954. His first year of nationally competitive events was 1957, by which time he was running a small engineering firm in Surrey. Success in sports car racing saw him make his Formula One debut for Team Lotus in 1959. In 1960 he won three non-championship Formula One races and finished fourth in the World Drivers Championship. Badly injured in the 1961 Monaco Grand Prix, Ireland recovered to win the Solitude Grand Prix and Flugplatzrennen races, then finished the season with a victory in the United States Grand Prix at Watkins Glen. He was sacked at the end of the season as team boss Colin Chapman considered Jim Clark a better bet.

Ireland entered a Ferrari in the 24 Hours of Daytona, with motorcycle racer Mike Hailwood as his intended co-driver, but broke down with gearbox problems after 3 1/2 hours, before Hailwood was scheduled to participate.

Ireland was encouraged by Bill France Sr., founder of NASCAR, to participate in the 1967 Daytona 500, one of the last races of his career, where the V8 engine of his year-old Dodge exploded opposite the stands.

Ireland worked as a journalist for ESPN for several F1 races in the late 1980s, as well as the American Road & Track magazine and Autocar magazine. He also operated fishing trawlers in the North Atlantic. Towards the end of his life, he was elected president of the British Racing Drivers' Club, a post he still held at the time of his death from cancer on 22 October 1993, in Reading, Berkshire.

== Writing ==
As a writer, Ireland produced an autobiography, All Arms and Elbows (1967; ISBN 0-85184-050-7). Another book, Marathon in the Dust (1970), is Ireland's account of the gruelling 1968 Daily Express London-Sydney Marathon, which he completed with two friends, fellow Formula One competitor Michael Taylor and British bobsledder Andy Hedges, in a Mercedes Benz 280 SE.

== Personal life ==
On 30 October 1954, Ireland married Scarborough schoolteacher Norma Thomas. They had two daughters before divorcing in 1967. He then married Edna Humphries also in 1967. Ireland married his third wife Jean Mander (née Howarth), a former fashion model, on 11 June 1993 at Newbury register office. Jean had been engaged to Mike Hawthorn at the time of Hawthorn's death in 1959. Ireland also had a son who died in 1992.

Ireland was described as a larger-than-life character who, according to a rival team boss, "lived without sense, without an analyst, and provoked astonishment and affection from everyone."

== Racing record ==
=== Complete Formula One World Championship results ===
(key) (Races in italics indicate fastest lap)

Year	Entrant	Chassis	Engine	1	2	3	4	5	6	7	8	9	10	WDC	Pts.
1959	Team Lotus	Lotus 16	Climax FPF 2.5 L4	MON	500	NED; 4	FRA; Ret	GBR	GER; Ret	POR; Ret	ITA; Ret	USA; 5		14th	5
1960	Team Lotus	Lotus 18	Climax FPF 2.5 L4	ARG; 6	MON; 9	500	NED; 2	BEL; Ret	FRA; 7	GBR; 3	POR; 6	ITA	USA; 2	4th	18
1961	Team Lotus	Lotus 21	Climax FPF 1.5 L4	MON; DNS	NED	BEL; Ret	FRA; 4	GBR; 10	GER; Ret		USA; 1			6th	12
1961	Team Lotus	Lotus 18/21	Climax FPF 1.5 L4							ITA; Ret				6th	12
1962	UDT-Laystall Racing Team	Lotus 24	Climax FWMV 1.5 V8	NED; Ret	MON; Ret	BEL; Ret	FRA; Ret	GBR; 16	GER	ITA; Ret	USA; 8	RSA; 5		16th	2
1963	British Racing Partnership	Lotus 24	BRM P56 1.5 V8	MON; Ret					GER; Ret					9th	6
1963	British Racing Partnership	BRP Mk1	BRM P56 1.5 V8		BEL; Ret	NED; 4	FRA; 9	GBR; Ret		ITA; 4	USA	MEX	RSA	9th	6
1964	British Racing Partnership	Lotus 24	BRM P56 1.5 V8	MON; DNS	NED									14th	4
1964	British Racing Partnership	BRP Mk1	BRM P56 1.5 V8			BEL; 10	FRA; Ret							14th	4
1964	British Racing Partnership	BRP Mk2	BRM P56 1.5 V8					GBR; 10	GER	AUT; 5	ITA; 5	USA; Ret	MEX; 12	14th	4
1965	Reg Parnell Racing	Lotus 25	BRM P56 1.5 V8	RSA	MON	BEL; 13	FRA; Ret	GBR; Ret	NED; 10	GER				NC	0
1965	Reg Parnell Racing	Lotus 33	BRM P56 1.5 V8								ITA; 9	USA; Ret	MEX; DNS	NC	0
1966	Bernard White Racing	BRM P261	BRM P60 1.9 V8	MON	BEL	FRA	GBR	NED	GER	ITA	USA; Ret	MEX; Ret		NC	0

=== Non-championship Formula One results ===
(key) (Races in bold indicate pole position)

Year	Entrant	Chassis	Engine	1	2	3	4	5	6	7	8	9	10	11	12	13	14	15	16	17	18	19	20	21
1957	Equipe Endeavour	Cooper T43 F2	Climax FPF 1.5 L4	BUE	SYR	GLV	NAP	RMS	CAE	INT; Ret	MOD	MOR												
1959	Team Lotus	Lotus 16 F2	Climax FPF 1.5 L4	GLV	AIN	INT; 11	OUL																	
1959	Team Lotus	Lotus 16	Climax FPF 2.5 L4					SIL; Ret																
1960	Team Lotus	Lotus 18	Climax FPF 2.5 L4	BUE; Ret	GLV; 1	INT; 1	SIL; Ret	LOM; 1	OUL; Ret															
1961	Team Lotus	Lotus 18	Climax FPF 1.5 L4	**LOM**; Ret	GLV; 5	PAU	BRX; 9	VIE	AIN; 10	SYR; Ret	NAP	LON	SIL		KAN; Ret		MOD; DNQ							
1961	Team Lotus	Lotus 21	Climax FPF 1.5 L4											SOL; 1		DAN; 2		**FLG**; 1	OUL; Ret	LEW	VAL	RAN	NAT	RSA
1962	UDT-Laystall Racing Team	Lotus 18/21	Climax FPF 1.5 L4	CAP	BRX; 3	LOM; Ret	LAV	GLV; 3	PAU	AIN; Ret														
1962	UDT-Laystall Racing Team	Ferrari 156	Ferrari 178 1.5 V6								INT; 4													
1962	UDT-Laystall Racing Team	Lotus 24	BRM P56 1.5 V8									NAP	MAL	CLP; 1										
1962	UDT-Laystall Racing Team	Lotus 24	Climax FWMV 1.5 V8												RMS; 3	SOL; DNA	KAN; 4	MED	DAN; 3	OUL; Ret	MEX; 3	RAN; Ret	NAT	
1963	British Racing Partnership	Lotus 24	BRM P56 1.5 V8	LOM; 3	GLV; 1	PAU	IMO	SYR	AIN; 2	**INT**; 4	ROM		KAN	MED	AUT	OUL; Ret	RAN							
1963	British Racing Partnership	BRP Mk1	BRM P56 1.5 V8									SOL; 3												
1964	British Racing Partnership	BRP Mk1	BRM P56 1.5 V8	DMT; 1	NWT; Ret	SYR																		
1964	British Racing Partnership	BRP Mk2	BRM P56 1.5 V8				AIN; Ret	INT; Ret	SOL; Ret	MED; 3	RAN													
1965	Reg Parnell Racing	Lotus 25	BRM P56 1.5 V8	ROC	SYR; Ret	SMT	INT	MED; 5																
1965	Reg Parnell Racing	Lotus 25/33^{1}	BRM P60 2.0 V8						RAN; 6															
1966	Reg Parnell Racing	Lotus 25/33^{1}	BRM P60 2.0 V8	RSA; Ret	SYR	INT																		
1966	Bernard White Racing	BRM P261	BRM P60 1.9 V8				OUL; 4																	

^1 The Parnell Lotus driven by Ireland in 1965 and 1966 was a written-off 25 rebuilt around a 33 monocoque.

=== Complete British Saloon Car Championship results ===
(key) (Races in bold indicate pole position; races in italics indicate fastest lap.)

Year	Team	Car	Class	1	2	3	4	5	6	7	8	Pos.	Pts	Class
1962	Ford Motor Company	Ford Zodiac Mk 3	C	SNE	GOO	AIN	SIL ovr:? cls:1	CRY	AIN	BRH	OUL	17th	9	**2nd**
1964	McKechnie Racing	Ford Cortina Lotus	B	SNE	GOO	OUL	AIN	SIL ovr:7 cls:4	CRY	BRH	OUL	27th	2	11th

=== 24 Hours of Le Mans results ===
Year	Team	Co-Drivers	Car	Class	Laps	Pos.	Class Pos.
1958	(United Kingdom) Team Lotus	(United Kingdom) Mike Taylor	Lotus 11	S 1.1	162	DNF	DNF
1959	(United Kingdom) Ecurie Ecosse	(United States) Masten Gregory	Jaguar D-Type	S 3.0	70	DNF	DNF
1960	(United Kingdom) Team Lotus	(United Kingdom) John Whitmore	Lotus Elite Mk. 14	S 2.0	0	DNS	DNS
1962	(United Kingdom) UDT Laystall Racing Team	(United States) Masten Gregory	Ferrari 250 GTO	GT 3.0	165	DNF	DNF
1963	(United Kingdom) David Brown Racing Dept.	(New Zealand) Bruce McLaren	Aston Martin DP214	GT +3.0	59	DNF	DNF
1964	(United Kingdom) Maranello Concessionaires	(South Africa) Tony Maggs	Ferrari 250 GTO	GT 3.0	328	6th	**2nd**
1965	(United Kingdom) Ford Advanced Vehicles	(United Kingdom) John Whitmore	Ford GT40	GT 5.0	72	DNF	DNF
1966	(United Kingdom) F.R. English Ltd. \ Comstock Racing	(Austria) Jochen Rindt	Ford GT40 Mk I	S 5.0	8	DNF	DNF

=== NASCAR: Grand National ===
==== Daytona 500 ====
Year	Team	Manufacturer	Start	Finish
1967	Ray Fox	'66 Dodge Charger	20	27

== See also ==
- Formula One drivers from the United Kingdom

== Bibliography ==
- Oliver, Michael (2003). Innes Ireland: The Garter King. Veloce Publishing. ISBN 978-1-90370-671-8.

Sporting positions
Preceded by Jack Brabham	BRDC International Trophy; Winner; 1960	Succeeded by Stirling Moss
Preceded by Gerald Lascelles	BRDC President; 1992–1993	Succeeded by The Lord Hesketh
