= 1962 Glover Trophy =

- Non-championship race in the 1962 Formula One season

Race details
- Date: 23 April 1962
- Official name: X Glover Trophy
- Location: Goodwood Circuit, West Sussex
- Course: Permanent racing facility
- Course length: 3.862 km (2.4 miles)
- Distance: 42 laps, 162.2 km (100.8 miles)

Pole position
Driver	(United Kingdom) Stirling Moss	Lotus-Climax
- Time: 1:34.2

Fastest lap
Drivers	(United Kingdom) John Surtees	Lola-Climax
	(United Kingdom) Stirling Moss	Lotus-Climax
- Time: 1:22.0

Podium
First	(United Kingdom) Graham Hill	BRM
Second	(New Zealand) Bruce McLaren	Cooper-Climax
Third	(United Kingdom) Innes Ireland	Lotus-Climax

The 10th Glover Trophy was a motor race, run for Formula One cars, held on 23 April 1962 at Goodwood Circuit, England. The race was run over 42 laps of the circuit, and was won by British driver Graham Hill in a BRM P57.

This race was held directly after the 1962 Lavant Cup, on the same day at the same circuit. Bruce McLaren, who had won the Lavant Cup, finished second in this race. Another Formula One race, the 1962 Pau Grand Prix, was also held on the same day.

This event was particularly notable for the serious accident suffered by Stirling Moss, which ended his Formula One career.

== Results ==
Pos	Driver	Entrant	Constructor	Time/Retired	Grid
1	(United Kingdom) Graham Hill	Owen Racing Organisation	BRM	58:55.2	2
2	(New Zealand) Bruce McLaren	Cooper Car Company	Cooper-Climax	+ 43.4 s	3
3	(United Kingdom) Innes Ireland	UDT-Laystall Racing Team	Lotus-Climax	41 laps	4
4	(United Kingdom) Roy Salvadori	Bowmaker Racing Team	Lola-Climax	41 laps	10
5	(United States) Masten Gregory	UDT-Laystall Racing Team	Lotus-Climax	41 laps	8
6	(New Zealand) Tony Shelly	John Dalton	Lotus-Climax	40 laps	7
7	(United Kingdom) Keith Greene	Gilby Engineering	Gilby-Climax	39 laps	14
8	(United States) Tony Settember	Emeryson Cars	Emeryson-Climax	38 laps	9
9	(United Kingdom) Gerry Ashmore	Gerry Ashmore	Lotus-Climax	38 laps	16
10	(United States) Richie Ginther	Owen Racing Organisation	BRM	38 laps	6
11	(Germany) Wolfgang Seidel	Autosport Team Wolfgang Seidel	Porsche	38 laps	13
Ret	(United Kingdom) Stirling Moss	UDT-Laystall Racing Team	Lotus-Climax	Accident	1
Ret	(United Kingdom) John Surtees	Bowmaker Racing Team	Lola-Climax	Engine	5
Ret	(United Kingdom) Graham Eden	Gerry Ashmore	Emeryson-Climax	Engine	15
Ret	(United States) Jay Chamberlain	Jay Chamberlain	Lotus-Climax	Water leak	12
WD	(Germany) Günther Seiffert	Autosport Team Wolfgang Seidel	Lotus-Climax	Car damaged at previous race	-
WD	(United Kingdom) John Campbell-Jones	Emeryson Cars	Emeryson-Climax	Engine in previous race	(11)

Previous race: 1962 Lavant Cup	Formula One non-championship races 1962 season	Next race: 1962 Pau Grand Prix
Previous race: 1961 Glover Trophy	Glover Trophy	Next race: 1963 Glover Trophy
