= 1962 Crystal Palace Trophy =

- Non-championship race in the 1962 Formula One season
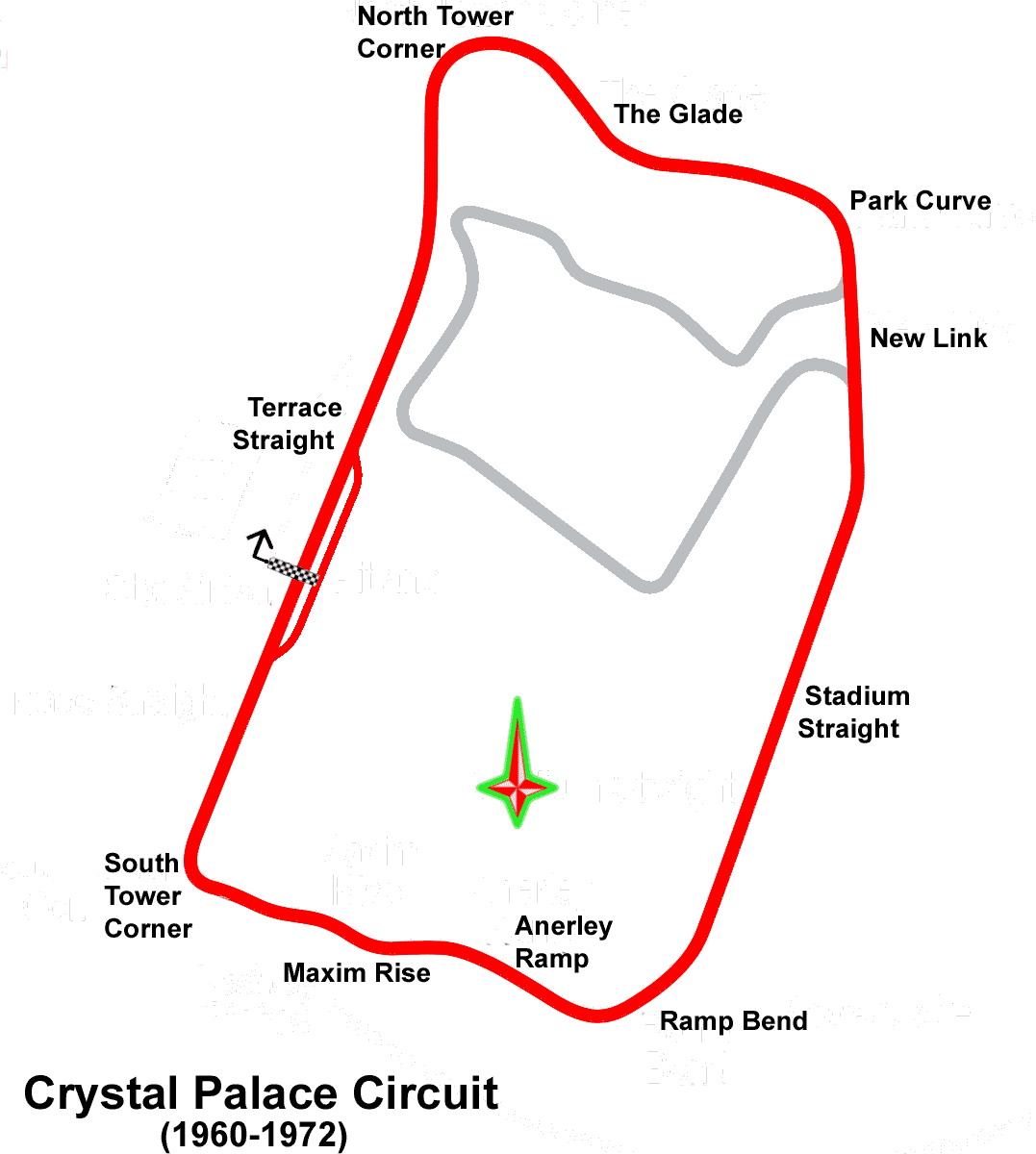

Race details
- Date: 11 June 1962
- Official name: XIII Crystal Palace Trophy
- Location: Crystal Palace Circuit, London
- Course: Permanent racing facility
- Course length: 2.240 km (1.390 miles)
- Distance: 36 laps, 79.2 km (50.04 miles)

Pole position
Driver	(United Kingdom) Roy Salvadori	Lola-Climax
- Time: 58.0

Fastest lap
Driver	(United Kingdom) Innes Ireland	Lotus-BRM
- Time: 57.2

Podium
First	(United Kingdom) Innes Ireland	Lotus-BRM
Second	(United Kingdom) Roy Salvadori	Lola-Climax
Third	(New Zealand) Bruce McLaren	Cooper-Climax

The 13th Crystal Palace Trophy was a motor race, run for Formula One cars, held on 11 June 1962 at the Crystal Palace Circuit, London. The race was run over 36 laps of the circuit, and was won by British driver Innes Ireland in a Lotus 24.

Ireland arrived too late to take part in practice and had to start from the back of the grid. He won anyway, taking the lead in the first few laps. John Campbell-Jones' car retired with fuel feed problems, and he later admitted he suspected foul play.

Another Formula One race was held on the same day, the 1962 International 2000 Guineas, at Mallory Park.

== Results ==
Pos	No.	Driver	Entrant	Constructor	Time/Retired	Grid
1	4	(United Kingdom) Innes Ireland	UDT-Laystall Racing Team	Lotus-BRM	34:46.4	11
2	1	(United Kingdom) Roy Salvadori	Bowmaker Racing Team	Lola-Climax	+ 20.2 s	1
3	2	(New Zealand) Bruce McLaren	Cooper Car Company	Cooper-Climax	+ 22.6 s	2
4	11	(United States) Tony Settember	Emeryson Cars	Emeryson-Climax	35 laps	5
5	9	(United Kingdom) Brian Hart	Brian Hart	Lotus-Ford	35 laps	8
6	6	(United Kingdom) David Piper	Speed Sport	Lotus-Climax	34 laps	7
7	14	(United Kingdom) Keith Greene	Gilby Engineering	Gilby-Climax	32 laps	6
Ret	3	(United Kingdom) Trevor Taylor	Team Lotus	Lotus-Climax	Ignition	3
Ret	5	(West Germany) Günther Seiffert	Autosport Team Wolfgang Seidel	Lotus-Climax	Gearbox	10
Ret	10	(United Kingdom) John Campbell-Jones	Emeryson Cars	Emeryson-Climax	Fuel feed	4
Ret	7	(United States) Jay Chamberlain	Jay Chamberlain	Lotus-Climax	Con-rod	12
Ret	12	(United Kingdom) Graham Eden	Gerry Ashmore	Lotus-Climax	Gearbox	9
WD	8	(United Kingdom) Philip Robinson	A. Robinson & Sons	Lotus-Climax	Car not ready	-

Previous race: 1962 International 2000 Guineas	Formula One non-championship races 1962 season	Next race: 1962 Reims Grand Prix
Previous race: 1954 Crystal Palace Trophy	Crystal Palace Trophy	Next race: —
