= 1961 Glover Trophy =

- Non-championship race in the 1961 Formula One season

Race details
- Date: 3 April 1961
- Official name: IX Glover Trophy
- Location: Goodwood Circuit, West Sussex
- Course: Permanent racing facility
- Course length: 3.862 km (2.4 miles)
- Distance: 42 laps, 162.2 km (100.8 miles)

Pole position
Driver	(United Kingdom) Stirling Moss	Lotus-Climax
- Time: 1:27.8

Fastest lap
Driver	(United Kingdom) John Surtees	Cooper-Climax
- Time: 1:28.0

Podium
First	(United Kingdom) John Surtees	Cooper-Climax
Second	(United Kingdom) Graham Hill	BRM
Third	(United Kingdom) Roy Salvadori	Cooper-Climax

The 9th Glover Trophy was a motor race, run to Formula One rules, held on 3 April 1961 at Goodwood Circuit, England. The race was run over 42 laps of the circuit, and was won by British driver John Surtees in a Cooper T53. The event was held on the same day as the 1961 Pau Grand Prix, which compromised the quality of the entry at both meetings.

== Results ==
Pos	Driver	Entrant	Constructor	Time/Retired	Grid
1	(United Kingdom) John Surtees	Yeoman Credit Racing Team	Cooper-Climax	1.03:10.0	2
2	(United Kingdom) Graham Hill	Owen Racing Organisation	BRM	+ 26.6 s	4
3	(United Kingdom) Roy Salvadori	Yeoman Credit Racing Team	Cooper-Climax	+ 1:09.4 s	3
4	(United Kingdom) Stirling Moss	Rob Walker Racing Team	Lotus-Climax	+ 1:23.6 s	1
5	(United Kingdom) Innes Ireland	Team Lotus	Lotus-Climax	41 laps	5
6	(United Kingdom) Henry Taylor	UDT-Laystall Racing Team	Lotus-Climax	41 laps	7
7	(United Kingdom) Tony Marsh	Tony Marsh	Lotus-Climax	41 laps	9
8	(United Kingdom) Cliff Allison	UDT-Laystall Racing Team	Lotus-Climax	40 laps	8
9	(United Kingdom) Bruce Halford	Emeryson Cars	Emeryson-Climax	40 laps	11
10	(United Kingdom) John Campbell-Jones	John Campbell-Jones	Cooper-Climax	39 laps	13
11	(United Kingdom) Keith Greene	Gilby Engineering	Gilby-Climax	39 laps	12
12	(United Kingdom) George Morgan	Tommy Atkins	Cooper-Climax	38 laps	14
Ret	(United Kingdom) Tony Brooks	Owen Racing Organisation	BRM	Accident	6
Ret	(United Kingdom) Shane Summers	Terry Bartram	Cooper-Climax	Accident	10
DNS	(United States) Lloyd Casner	Camoradi International	Lotus-Climax	Car not ready	-

Previous race: 1961 Lombank Trophy	Formula One non-championship races 1961 season	Next race: 1961 Pau Grand Prix
Previous race: 1960 Glover Trophy	Glover Trophy	Next race: 1962 Glover Trophy
