= 1953 Curtis Trophy =

Race details
- Date: 17 October 1953
- Official name: I Curtis Trophy
- Location: Snetterton Circuit, Norfolk
- Course: Permanent racing facility
- Course length: 4.361 km (2.719 miles)
- Distance: 15 laps, 65.43 km (40.78 miles)

Fastest lap
| Driver | (United Kingdom) Bob Gerard | Cooper-Bristol |
- Time: 2:08.8

Podium
| First | (United Kingdom) Bob Gerard | Cooper-Bristol |
| Second | (United Kingdom) Les Leston | Cooper-JAP |
| Third | (United Kingdom) Jimmy Somervail | Cooper-Bristol |

The 1st Curtis Trophy was a Formula Two motor race held on 17 October 1953 at Snetterton Circuit, Norfolk. The race was run over 15 laps of the circuit, and was won by British driver Bob Gerard in a Cooper T23-Bristol, who also set fastest lap. Les Leston in a Cooper T26-JAP and Jimmy Somervail in a Cooper T20-Bristol were second and third.

== Results ==
| Pos | Driver | Entrant | Constructor | Time/Retired |
|---|---|---|---|---|
| 1 | (United Kingdom) Bob Gerard | F.R. Gerard | Cooper T23-Bristol | 33:45.0, 116.32kph |
| 2 | (United Kingdom) Les Leston | Les Leston | Cooper T26-JAP | +2:28.4 |
| 3 | (United Kingdom) Jimmy Somervail | Border Reivers | Cooper T20-Bristol | +1 lap |
| 4 | (United Kingdom) Paul Emery | Emeryson Cars | Emeryson-Aston Martin | +1 lap |
| 5 | (United Kingdom) Horace Gould | Gould's Garage (Bristol) | Cooper T23-Bristol | |
| Ret. | (United Kingdom) Kenneth McAlpine | Connaught Engineering | Connaught Type A-Lea Francis | accident |
| Ret. | (United Kingdom) Eric Thompson | Cooper Car Company | Cooper T24-Alta | |
| Ret. | (United Kingdom) Roy Salvadori | Connaught Engineering | Connaught Type A-Lea Francis | |
| Ret. | (United Kingdom) Ron Flockhart | Connaught Engineering | Connaught Type A-Lea Francis | 0 laps, gearbox |
| DNS | (United Kingdom) Rodney Nuckey | Rodney Nuckey | Cooper T23-Bristol | accident in practice |

| Previous race: 1953 Joe Fry Memorial Trophy | Formula One non-championship races 1953 season | Next race: 1954 Syracuse Grand Prix |
| Previous race: — | Curtis Trophy | Next race: 1954 Curtis Trophy |
