= 1958 Glover Trophy =

- Non-championship race in the 1958 Formula One season

Race details
- Date: 7 April 1958
- Official name: VI Glover Trophy
- Location: Goodwood Circuit, West Sussex
- Course: Permanent racing facility
- Course length: 3.862 km (2.4 miles)
- Distance: 42 laps, 100.8 km (162.2 miles)

Pole position
Driver	(United Kingdom) Stirling Moss	Cooper-Climax

Fastest lap
Drivers	(United Kingdom) Mike Hawthorn	Ferrari
	(United Kingdom) Stirling Moss	Cooper-Climax
- Time: 1:28.8

Podium
First	(United Kingdom) Mike Hawthorn	Ferrari
Second	(Australia) Jack Brabham	Cooper-Climax
Third	(United Kingdom) Roy Salvadori	Cooper-Climax

The 1958 Glover Trophy was a motor race, run to Formula One rules, held on 7 April 1958 at Goodwood Circuit, England. The race was run over 42 laps of the circuit, and was won by British driver Mike Hawthorn in a Ferrari Dino 246.

== Results ==
Pos	No.	Driver	Entrant	Constructor	Time/Retired	Grid
1	1	(United Kingdom) Mike Hawthorn	Scuderia Ferrari	Ferrari	1.03:44.4	3
2	19	(Australia) Jack Brabham	Cooper Car Company	Cooper-Climax	+ 36.0 s	6
3	18	(United Kingdom) Roy Salvadori	Cooper Car Company	Cooper-Climax	41 laps	4
4	22	(United Kingdom) Cliff Allison	Team Lotus	Lotus-Climax	41 laps	7
5	14	(United Kingdom) Stuart Lewis-Evans	B.C. Ecclestone	Connaught-Alta	40 laps	10
6	12	(United Kingdom) Archie Scott Brown	B.C. Ecclestone	Connaught-Alta	40 laps	8
7	27	(United Kingdom) Tony Marsh	Tony Marsh	Cooper-Climax	40 laps	12
8	20	(United Kingdom) Ian Burgess	Cooper Car Company	Cooper-Climax	40 laps	9
9	6	(Australia) Keith Campbell	Keith Campbell	Maserati	38 laps	17
NC	15	(United Kingdom) Geoff Richardson	Geoff Richardson	Connaught-Alta	37 laps	16
NC	10	(United Kingdom) Bruce Halford	Bruce Halford	Maserati	33 laps	15
Ret	7	(United Kingdom) Stirling Moss	Rob Walker Racing Team	Cooper-Climax	Con-rod	1
Ret	4	(United States) Harry Schell	Owen Racing Organisation	BRM	Brakes	5
Ret	9	(United Kingdom) Tommy Bridger	British Racing Partnership	Cooper-Climax	Accident	11
Ret	3	(France) Jean Behra	Owen Racing Organisation	BRM	Brakes / accident	2
Ret	17	(United Kingdom) Paul Emery	Emeryson Cars	Emeryson-Jaguar	Engine	14
Ret	21	(United Kingdom) Graham Hill	Team Lotus	Lotus-Climax		13
DNS	5	(Australia) Ken Kavanagh	Ken Kavanagh	Maserati	Mechanical	–
DNA	8	(France) Maurice Trintignant	Rob Walker Racing Team	Cooper-Climax	Driver racing elsewhere	
DNA	11	(United Kingdom) Horace Gould	Gould's Garage	Maserati		
DNA	16	(United Kingdom) Verdun Edwards	Verdun Edwards	Connaught-Alta		
DNA	28	(United Kingdom) Dennis Taylor	Dennis Taylor	Lotus-Climax		
DNA	29	(United Kingdom) Brian Naylor	Brian Naylor	Cooper-Climax		

- A second Ferrari was entered by Scuderia Ferrari and shown in entry lists as #2, but no driver was assigned and the car did not run.

Previous race: 1957 Moroccan Grand Prix	Formula One non-championship races 1958 season	Next race: 1958 Syracuse Grand Prix
Previous race: 1957 Glover Trophy	Glover Trophy	Next race: 1959 Glover Trophy
