= 1954 Richmond Trophy =

- Formula Libre race

Race details
- Date: 19 April 1954
- Location: Goodwood Circuit, West Sussex
- Course: Permanent racing facility
- Course length: 3.830 km (2.388 miles)
- Distance: 21 laps, 80.43 km (50.15 miles)
- Weather: Dry, sunny
- Attendance: 55,000

Fastest lap
| Drivers | (United Kingdom) Ken Wharton | BRM |
| | (United Kingdom) Roy Salvadori | Maserati |
- Time: 1:37.8

Podium
| First | (United Kingdom) Ken Wharton | BRM |
| Second | (United Kingdom) Kenneth McAlpine | Connaught |
| Third | (United Kingdom) Leslie Marr | Connaught |

The 1954 Richmond Trophy was a Formula Libre motor race held at the Goodwood Circuit, West Sussex on 19 April 1954. The winner was also awarded the Glover Trophy. The race was won by Ken Wharton in a BRM Type 15, setting joint fastest lap in the process. Roy Salvadori in a Maserati 250F equalled Wharton's time but retired after colliding with him. Kenneth McAlpine and Leslie Marr were second and third in their Connaught A Type-Lea Francises.

== Results ==
| Pos | No | Driver | Entrant | Car | Time/Retired |
|---|---|---|---|---|---|
| 1 | 5 | (United Kingdom) Ken Wharton | A.G.B. Owen | BRM Type 15 | 35:00.0; 139.05kph |
| 2 | 40 | (United Kingdom) Kenneth McAlpine | Connaught Engineering | Connaught A Type-Lea Francis | +40.0s |
| 3 | 18 | (United Kingdom) Leslie Marr | Connaught Engineering | Connaught A Type-Lea Francis | +1:00.4 |
| 4 | 6 | (United Kingdom) Ron Flockhart | A.G.B. Owen | BRM P30 | +1:08.0 |
| 5 | 39 | (United Kingdom) Peter Whitehead | Peter Whitehead | Cooper T24-Alta | +1 lap |
| 6 | 56 | (United Kingdom) Charles Boulton | Connaught Engineering | Connaught A Type-Lea Francis | +1 lap |
