= 1963 Glover Trophy =

- Non-championship race in the 1963 Formula One season

Race details
- Date: 15 April 1963
- Official name: XI Glover Trophy
- Location: Goodwood Circuit, West Sussex
- Course: Permanent racing facility
- Course length: 3.862 km (2.4 miles)
- Distance: 42 laps, 162.2 km (100.8 miles)

Pole position
Driver	(United Kingdom) Graham Hill	BRM
- Time: 1:22.0

Fastest lap
Driver	(United Kingdom) Graham Hill	BRM
- Time: 1:22.4

Podium
First	(United Kingdom) Innes Ireland	Lotus-BRM
Second	(New Zealand) Bruce McLaren	Cooper-Climax
Third	(South Africa) Tony Maggs	Lotus-Climax

The 11th Glover Trophy was a motor race, run to Formula One rules, held on 15 April 1963 at Goodwood Circuit, England. The race was run over 42 laps of the circuit, and was won by British driver Innes Ireland in a Lotus 24, after polesitter Graham Hill suffered fuel injection problems while leading in his BRM.

Another Formula One race, the 1963 Pau Grand Prix, was also held on the same day.

== Results ==
Pos	Driver	Entrant	Constructor	Time/Retired	Grid
1	(United Kingdom) Innes Ireland	British Racing Partnership	Lotus-BRM	59:02.4	4
2	(New Zealand) Bruce McLaren	Cooper Car Company	Cooper-Climax	+ 5.0 s	2
3	(South Africa) Tony Maggs	Reg Parnell (Racing)	Lotus-Climax	41 laps	8
4	(United States) Jim Hall	British Racing Partnership	Lotus-BRM	41 laps	6
5	(New Zealand) Chris Amon	Reg Parnell (Racing)	Lola-Climax	40 laps	7
6	(Australia) Jack Brabham	Brabham Racing Organisation	Brabham-Climax	40 laps	3
7	(United Kingdom) Ian Raby	Ian Raby (Racing)	Gilby-BRM	39 laps	9
8	(United Kingdom) Philip Robinson	A. Robinson & Sons	Lotus-Climax	39 laps	10
9	(United Kingdom) Graham Hill	Owen Racing Organisation	BRM	38 laps	1
Ret	(United States) Richie Ginther	Owen Racing Organisation	BRM	Valve	5
WD	(Germany) Günther Seiffert	Autosport Team Wolfgang Seidel	Lotus-BRM	Car not ready	-
WD	(United Kingdom) Ian Raby	Autosport Team Wolfgang Seidel	Lotus-BRM	Car not ready (drove Gilby instead)	-

Previous race: 1963 Lombank Trophy	Formula One non-championship races 1963 season	Next race: 1963 Pau Grand Prix
Previous race: 1962 Glover Trophy	Glover Trophy	Next race: 1964 News of the World Trophy
