= 1960 Glover Trophy =

- Non-championship race in the 1960 Formula One season

Race details
- Date: 18 April 1960
- Official name: VIII Glover Trophy
- Location: Goodwood Circuit, West Sussex
- Course: Permanent racing facility
- Course length: 3.862 km (2.4 miles)
- Distance: 42 laps, 162.2 km (100.8 miles)

Pole position
Driver	(United Kingdom) Chris Bristow	Cooper-Climax
- Time: 1:24.8

Fastest lap
Driver	(United Kingdom) Stirling Moss	Cooper-Climax
- Time: 1:24.0

Podium
First	(United Kingdom) Innes Ireland	Lotus-Climax
Second	(United Kingdom) Stirling Moss	Cooper-Climax
Third	(United Kingdom) Chris Bristow	Cooper-Climax

The 8th Glover Trophy was a motor race, run to Formula One rules, held on 18 April 1960 at Goodwood Circuit, England. The race was run over 42 laps of the circuit, and was won by British driver Innes Ireland in a Lotus 18. This was the first Formula 1 win for the Lotus marque in an international race (there had been an earlier win at Davidstow, Cornwall in 1954 in a national race).

== Results ==
Pos	Driver	Entrant	Constructor	Time/Retired	Grid
1	(United Kingdom) Innes Ireland	Team Lotus	Lotus-Climax	1.00:14.8	4
2	(United Kingdom) Stirling Moss	Rob Walker Racing Team	Cooper-Climax	+ 2.8 s	2
3	(United Kingdom) Chris Bristow	Yeoman Credit Racing Team	Cooper-Climax	+ 1:05.0 s	1
4	(New Zealand) Bruce McLaren	Cooper Car Company	Cooper-Climax	+ 1:17.6 s	6
5	(United Kingdom) Graham Hill	Owen Racing Organisation	BRM	41 laps	9
6	(Sweden) Jo Bonnier	Owen Racing Organisation	BRM	41 laps	10
7	(United Kingdom) Tony Brooks	G.A. Vandervell	Vanwall	41 laps	8
Ret	(United Kingdom) Roy Salvadori	C.T. Atkins / High Efficiency Motors	Cooper-Climax	Transmission	5
Ret	(United States) Harry Schell	Yeoman Credit Racing Team	Cooper-Climax	Throttle	3
Ret	(United Kingdom) Mike Taylor	Taylor & Crawley	Lotus-Climax	Engine	13
Ret	(United Kingdom) Keith Greene	Gilby Engineering	Cooper-Climax		12
Ret	(United Kingdom) Alan Stacey	Team Lotus	Lotus-Climax	Oil pipe	11
Ret	(United States) Dan Gurney	Owen Racing Organisation	BRM	Accident	7
WD	(Australia) Jack Brabham	Cooper Car Company	Cooper-Climax		-
WD	(United Kingdom) Geoff Richardson	Geoff Richardson	Cooper		-

Previous race: 1959 Silver City Trophy	Formula One non-championship races 1960 season	Next race: 1960 BRDC International Trophy
Previous race: 1959 Glover Trophy	Glover Trophy	Next race: 1961 Glover Trophy
