= 1961 Flugplatzrennen =

- Non-championship race in the 1961 Formula One season
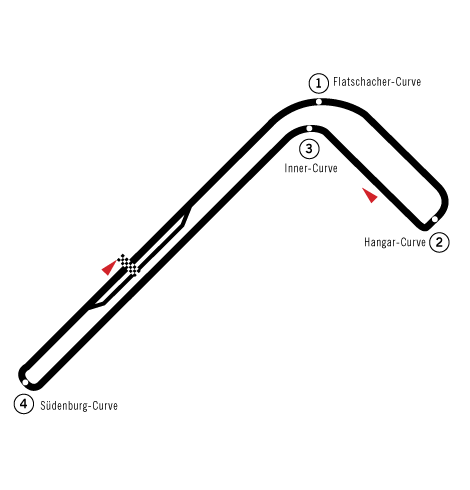

Race details
- Date: 17 September 1961
- Official name: III Flugplatzrennen / V Flugplatzrennen
- Location: Zeltweg Airfield
- Course: Permanent racing facility
- Course length: 3.2 km (1.988 miles)
- Distance: 80 laps, 256 km (159.071 miles)

Pole position
Driver	(United Kingdom) Innes Ireland	Lotus-Climax
- Time: 1:15.6

Fastest lap
Driver	(United Kingdom) Innes Ireland	Lotus-Climax
- Time: 1:13.6

Podium
First	(United Kingdom) Innes Ireland	Lotus-Climax
Second	(Australia) Jack Brabham	Cooper-Climax
Third	(Sweden) Jo Bonnier	Porsche

The Flugplatzrennen (known alternately as either 3rd Flugplatzrennen or 5th Flugplatzrennen) was a motor race, run for cars complying with Formula One rules, held on 17 September 1961 at Zeltweg Airfield, Austria. The race was run over 80 laps of the circuit, and was dominated by British driver Innes Ireland in a Lotus 21.

Ireland took both pole position and the fastest lap, and finished a lap ahead of the rest of the field. He led all but the first two laps, after Jim Clark took the lead at the start.

Lorenzo Bandini did not start the race after he suffered engine problems in practice, but shared his team-mate Renato Pirocchi's car in the race.

== Qualifying ==
Pos	No.	Driver	Constructor	Time	Gap
1	4	(United Kingdom) Innes Ireland	Lotus-Climax	1:15.6	-
2	5	(United Kingdom) Jim Clark	Lotus-Climax	1:16.3	+ 0.7
3	8	(United Kingdom) John Surtees	Cooper-Climax	1:16.6	+ 1.0
4	1	(Australia) Jack Brabham	Cooper-Climax	1:17.2	+ 1.6
5	9	(United Kingdom) Roy Salvadori	Cooper-Climax	1:17.5	+ 1.9
6	16	(Germany) Wolfgang Seidel	Lotus-Climax	1:17.5	+ 1.9
7	6	(United Kingdom) Tony Marsh	BRM-Climax	1:17.6	+ 2.0
8	2	(Sweden) Jo Bonnier	Porsche	1:18.1	+ 2.5
9	18	(Italy) Ernesto Prinoth	Lotus-Climax	1:18.4	+ 2.8
10	19	(United Kingdom) Ian Burgess	Cooper-Climax	1:18.5	+ 2.9
11	10	(Italy) Lorenzo Bandini	Cooper-Maserati	1:19.6	+ 4.0
12	15	(United Kingdom) Tim Parnell	Lotus-Climax	1:20.5	+ 4.9
13	12	(Netherlands) Carel Godin de Beaufort	Porsche	1:20.9	+ 5.3
14	17	(France) Jo Schlesser	Cooper-Climax	1:23.0	+ 7.4
15	11	(Italy) Renato Pirocchi	Cooper-Maserati	1:23.0	+ 7.4
16	14	(Belgium) André Pilette	Emeryson-Maserati	1:25.8	+ 10.2

== Results ==
Pos	No.	Driver	Entrant	Constructor	Laps	Time/Retired	Grid
1	4	(United Kingdom) Innes Ireland	Team Lotus	Lotus-Climax	80	1.44:22.2	1
2	1	(Australia) Jack Brabham	Jack Brabham	Cooper-Climax	79		4
3	2	(Sweden) Jo Bonnier	Porsche System Engineering	Porsche	79		8
4	5	(United Kingdom) Jim Clark	Team Lotus	Lotus-Climax	77		2
5	19	(United Kingdom) Ian Burgess	Camoradi International	Cooper-Climax	76		10
6	12	(Netherlands) Carel Godin de Beaufort	Ecurie Maarsbergen	Porsche	76		13
7	15	(United Kingdom) Tim Parnell	Tim Parnell	Lotus-Climax	74		12
8	17	(France) Jo Schlesser	Inter-Autocourse	Cooper-Climax	73		14
9	14	(Belgium) André Pilette	Equipe Nationale Belge	Emeryson-Maserati	72		16
10	8	(United Kingdom) John Surtees	Yeoman Credit Racing Team	Cooper-Climax	60		3
11	11	(Italy) Renato Pirocchi (Italy) Lorenzo Bandini	Scuderia Centro Sud	Cooper-Maserati	47		15
Ret	6	(United Kingdom) Tony Marsh	Tony Marsh	BRM-Climax	50	Engine	7
Ret	16	(Germany) Wolfgang Seidel	Scuderia Colonia	Lotus-Climax	36	Engine	6
Ret	9	(United Kingdom) Roy Salvadori	Yeoman Credit Racing Team	Cooper-Climax	10	Accident	5
Ret	18	(Italy) Ernesto Prinoth	Scuderia Dolomiti	Lotus-Climax	6	Accident	9
DNS	10	(Italy) Lorenzo Bandini	Scuderia Centro Sud	Cooper-Maserati		Engine in practice	(11)
WD	8	(United Kingdom) Jackie Lewis	H & L Motors	Cooper-Climax			-
WD	20	(United Kingdom) Alan Markelson	Alan Markelson	Lister-Alfa Romeo		No car	-

- Porsche System Engineering entered a second car, given #3, but withdrew the entry.

Previous race: 1961 Modena Grand Prix	Formula One non-championship races 1961 season	Next race: 1961 International Gold Cup
Previous race: —	Flugplatzrennen	Next race: —
