= 1956 Glover Trophy =

- Non-championship race in the 1956 Formula One season
- Goodwood Circuit

Race details
- Date: 2 April 1956
- Official name: IV Glover Trophy
- Location: Goodwood Circuit, United Kingdom
- Course: Permanent racing facility
- Course length: 3.862 km (2.399 miles)
- Distance: 32 laps, 123.571 km (76.783 miles)

Pole position
Driver	(United Kingdom) Stirling Moss	Maserati
- Time: 1:32.0

Fastest lap
Driver	(United Kingdom) Stirling Moss	Maserati
- Time: 1:30.0

Podium
First	(United Kingdom) Stirling Moss	Maserati
Second	(United Kingdom) Roy Salvadori	Maserati
Third	(United Kingdom) Les Leston	Connaught-Alta

The 1956 Glover Trophy was a non-championship Formula One race, held on 2 April 1956 at Goodwood Circuit, England. The race was won by Stirling Moss after a set distance of 32 laps.

== Entry list ==
No	Driver	Entrant	Car	Engine
2	(United Kingdom) Stirling Moss	Stirling Moss Ltd	Maserati 250F	Maserati
2	(France) Robert Manzon	Equipe Gordini	Gordini T32	Gordini
3	(France) Élie Bayol	Equipe Gordini	Gordini T16	Gordini
4	(United Kingdom) Mike Hawthorn	Owen Racing Organisation	BRM P25	BRM
5	(United Kingdom) Tony Brooks	Owen Racing Organisation	BRM P25	BRM
6	(United Kingdom) Archie Scott-Brown	Connaught Engineering	Connaught Type B	Alta
7	(United Kingdom) Les Leston	Connaught Engineering	Connaught Type B	Alta
8	(United Kingdom) Bob Gerard	Connaught Engineering	Connaught Type B	Alta
9	(United Kingdom) Reg Parnell	R.R.C. Walker Racing Team	Connaught Type B	Alta
10	(United Kingdom) Roy Salvadori	Gilby Engineering	Maserati 250F	Maserati
12	(United Kingdom) Ken Wharton	Ecurie Rosier	Ferrari 500	Ferrari
14	(France) Louis Rosier	Ecurie Rosier	Maserati 250F	Maserati

== Classification ==
=== Qualifying ===
Pos	No	Driver	Constructor	Time	Gap
1	1	(United Kingdom) Stirling Moss	Maserati	1:32.0	-
2	6	(United Kingdom) Archie Scott-Brown	Connaught-Alta	1:32.6	+0.6
3	4	(United Kingdom) Mike Hawthorn	BRM	1:33.8	+1.8
4	8	(United Kingdom) Bob Gerard	Connaught-Alta	1:34.2	+2.2
5	10	(United Kingdom) Roy Salvadori	Maserati	1:36.2	+4.2
6	9	(United Kingdom) Reg Parnell	Connaught-Alta	1:36.6	+4.6
7	7	(United Kingdom) Les Leston	Connaught-Alta	1:37.4	+5.4
8	2	(France) Robert Manzon	Gordini	1:38.8	+6.8
9	14	(France) Louis Rosier	Maserati	1:42.0	+10.0
10	3	(France) Élie Bayol	Gordini	1:43.0	+11.0
11	12	(United Kingdom) Ken Wharton	Ferrari	1:57.4	+25.4
12	5	(United Kingdom) Tony Brooks	BRM	-	-

=== Race ===
Pos	No	Driver	Constructor	Laps	Time/Retired
1	1	(United Kingdom) Stirling Moss	Maserati	32	48:50.4
2	10	(United Kingdom) Roy Salvadori	Maserati	32	+1:03.2
3	7	(United Kingdom) Les Leston	Connaught-Alta	32	+1:35.4
4	8	(United Kingdom) Bob Gerard	Connaught-Alta	31	+1 Lap
5	9	(United Kingdom) Reg Parnell	Connaught-Alta	31	+1 Lap
6	2	(France) Robert Manzon	Gordini	30	+2 Laps
7	14	(France) Louis Rosier	Maserati	0	-
8	3	(France) Élie Bayol	Gordini	0	-
Ret	4	(United Kingdom) Mike Hawthorn	BRM	23	Lost wheel/Accident
Ret	6	(United Kingdom) Archie Scott-Brown	Connaught-Alta	17	Engine
Ret	5	(United Kingdom) Tony Brooks	BRM	9	Oil Pressure
Ret	12	(United Kingdom) Ken Wharton	Ferrari	1	Engine

Previous race: 1955 Syracuse Grand Prix	Formula One non-championship races 1956 season	Next race: 1956 Syracuse Grand Prix
Previous race: 1955 Glover Trophy	Glover Trophy	Next race: 1957 Glover Trophy
