= 1957 Glover Trophy =

- Non-championship race in the 1957 Formula One season

Race details
- Date: April 22, 1957
- Official name: V Glover Trophy
- Location: Goodwood Circuit, West Sussex
- Course: Permanent racing facility
- Course length: 3.862 km (2.4 miles)
- Distance: 32 laps, 123.584 km (76.8 miles)

Pole position
Driver	(United Kingdom) Stirling Moss	Vanwall
- Time: 1:28.2

Fastest lap
Driver	(United Kingdom) Tony Brooks	Vanwall
- Time: 1.29.6

Podium
First	(United Kingdom) Stuart Lewis-Evans	Connaught-Alta
Second	(United Kingdom) Jack Fairman	Connaught-Alta
Third	(United Kingdom) Ron Flockhart	BRM

The 1957 Glover Trophy was a motor race, run to Formula One rules, held on 22 April 1957 at Goodwood Circuit, England. The race was run over 42 laps of the circuit, and was won by British driver Stuart Lewis-Evans in a Connaught B Type.

The Team Lotus and Cooper Car Company works entries were Formula Two cars.

== Classification ==
Pos	No.	Driver	Entrant	Constructor	Time/Retired	Grid
1	4	(United Kingdom) Stuart Lewis-Evans	Connaught Engineering	Connaught-Alta	50:49.8	5
2	5	(United Kingdom) Jack Fairman	Connaught Engineering	Connaught-Alta	+ 6.8 s	7
3	2	(United Kingdom) Ron Flockhart	Owen Racing Organisation	BRM	32 laps	4
4	10	(Australia) Jack Brabham	Cooper Car Company	Cooper-Climax (F2)	31 laps	8
5	8	(United Kingdom) Jim Russell	Gilby Engineering	Maserati	31 laps	11
6	6	(United Kingdom) Tony Brooks	Vandervell Products	Vanwall	27 laps	2
Ret	7	(United Kingdom) Stirling Moss	Vandervell Products	Vanwall	Throttle linkage	1
Ret	3	(United Kingdom) Archie Scott Brown	Connaught Engineering	Connaught-Alta	Oil pressure	3
Ret	9	(United Kingdom) Paul Emery	Emeryson Cars	Emeryson-Alta		10
Ret	1	(United Kingdom) Roy Salvadori	Owen Racing Organisation	BRM	Brakes	6
DNS	14	(United Kingdom) Cliff Allison	Team Lotus	Lotus-Climax (F2)	Transmission	(9)
DNA	12	(United Kingdom) Keith Hall	Team Lotus	Lotus-Climax (F2)		–

- The Cooper Car Company had entered a second Formula Two Cooper (#11), but no driver was allocated and the car did not arrive.

Previous race: 1957 Pau Grand Prix	Formula One non-championship races 1957 season	Next race: 1957 Naples Grand Prix
Previous race: 1956 Glover Trophy	Glover Trophy	Next race: 1958 Glover Trophy
