= 1952 Richmond Trophy =

1952 Goodwood Trophy
- Non-championship race in the 1952 Formula One season

Race details
- Date: 14 April 1952
- Official name: IV Richmond Trophy
- Location: Chichester, West Sussex, UK
- Course: Goodwood Circuit
- Course length: 3.830 km (2.388 miles)
- Distance: 12 laps, 45.960 km (28.656 miles)

Pole position
Driver	(Argentina) José Froilán González	Ferrari

Fastest lap
Driver	(Argentina) José Froilán González	Ferrari
- Time: 1:36

Podium
First	(Argentina) José Froilán González	Ferrari
Second	(United Kingdom) Mike Hawthorn	Cooper-Bristol
Third	(United Kingdom) Duncan Hamilton	Talbot-Lago

The 4th Richmond Trophy was a non-championship Formula One motor race held at the Goodwood Circuit on 14 April 1952. The race was won by José Froilán González in a Ferrari 375, setting fastest lap in the process. Mike Hawthorn in a Cooper T20-Bristol was second and Duncan Hamilton third in a Talbot-Lago T26C.

== Results ==
Pos	No	Driver	Entrant	Car	Time/Retired	Grid
1	50	(Argentina) José Froilán González	G.A. Vandervell	Ferrari 375	19:35.0, 88.53mph	1
2	10	(United Kingdom) Mike Hawthorn	L.D. Hawthorn	Cooper T20-Bristol	+26.0s	7
3	60	(United Kingdom) Duncan Hamilton	D. Hamilton	Talbot-Lago T26C	+33.1s	5
4	34	(United Kingdom) George Abecassis	Hersham and Walton Motors	HWM-Alta	+40.2s	2
5	52	(United Kingdom) Graham Whitehead	G. Whitehead	ERA B-Type	+57.1s	4
6	4	(United Kingdom) Eric Brandon	Ecurie Richmond	Cooper T20-Bristol	+1:26.1	8
7	59	(United Kingdom) John James	J. James	Maserati 4CLT/48	+1 lap	9
8	57	(Republic of Ireland) Joe Kelly	J. Kelly	Alta F2	+1 lap	12
9	61	(United Kingdom) Bobby Baird	B. Baird	Maserati 4CLT/48	+1 lap	10
10	33	(United Kingdom) Bill Dobson	Scuderia Ambrosiana	Ferrari 125	+1 lap	11
11	36	(United Kingdom) Gordon Watson	G. Watson	Alta F2	+1 lap	13
Ret	42	(Australia) Tony Gaze	T. Gaze	Alta F2	9 laps	14
Ret	6	(United Kingdom) Bob Gerard	R.F. Gerard	ERA B-Type	4 laps, engine	6
Ret	53	(United Kingdom) Tony Rolt	Rob Walker Racing	Delage 15S8-ERA	3 laps, engine	3

Previous race: 1952 Valentino Grand Prix	Formula One non-championship races 1952 season	Next race: 1952 Lavant Cup
Previous race: 1951 Richmond Trophy	Richmond Trophy	Next race: 1953 Richmond Trophy
