= 1953 Joe Fry Memorial Trophy =

Race details
- Date: 3 October 1953
- Official name: II Joe Fry Memorial Trophy
- Location: Castle Combe Circuit, Wiltshire, UK
- Course: Airfield circuit
- Course length: 2.961 km (1.840 mi)
- Distance: 20 laps, 59.22 km (36.80 mi)

Fastest lap
| Driver | (United Kingdom) Bob Gerard | Cooper-Bristol |
- Time: 1:16.2

Podium
| First | (United Kingdom) Bob Gerard | Cooper-Bristol |
| Second | (United Kingdom) Horace Gould | Cooper-Bristol |
| Third | (United Kingdom) Ken Wharton | Cooper-Bristol |

The 2nd Joe Fry Memorial Trophy was a non-championship Formula Two motor race held at Castle Combe Circuit on 3 October 1953. The race was won by Bob Gerard in a Cooper T23-Bristol, setting fastest lap in the process. Horace Gould and Ken Wharton were second and third, also in Cooper T23s.

== Results ==
| Pos | No | Driver | Entrant | Car | Time/Retired |
|---|---|---|---|---|---|
| 1 | 50 | (United Kingdom) Bob Gerard | F.R. Gerard | Cooper T23-Bristol | 25:56.2, 137.03kph |
| 2 | 45 | (United Kingdom) Horace Gould | Gould's Garage Bristol | Cooper T23-Bristol | +23.8s |
| 3 | 44 | (United Kingdom) Ken Wharton | Ken Wharton | Cooper T23-Bristol | +46.8s |
| 4 | 49 | (United Kingdom) Leslie Marr | Leslie Marr | Connaught Type A-Lea Francis | 20 laps |
| | 42 | (United Kingdom) John Webb | John Webb | Turner-Lea Francis | |
| | 46 | (United Kingdom) Austen Nurse | Austen Nurse | HWM-Alta | |
| | 51 | (United Kingdom) Lawrence Mitchell | H.R. Mitchell | Frazer Nash High Speed | |
| | 57 | (United Kingdom) Dickie Stoop | Richard Stoop | Frazer Nash Mille Miglia | |
| | 59 | (United Kingdom) Guy Jason-Henry | Ecurie Brittanique | Connaught Type A-Lea Francis | |
| Ret | 52 | (United Kingdom) Les Leston | Les Leston | Cooper T26-JAP | 9 laps, chain |
| Ret | 40 | (United Kingdom) Roy Salvadori | Connaught Engineering | Connaught Type A-Lea Francis | 5 laps |
| Ret | 41 | (United Kingdom) Ron Searles | Oliver Simpson | Rover Special-BMW 328 | 0 laps, rear wheel |
| Ret | 53 | (United Kingdom) Kenneth McAlpine | Connaught Engineering | Connaught Type A-Lea Francis | 0 laps, engine |
| Ret | 47 | (United Kingdom) Tony Rolt | R.R.C. Walker Racing Team | Connaught Type A-Lea Francis | 0 laps, stopped to assist Moss |
| Ret | 43 | (United Kingdom) Stirling Moss | Cooper Car Company | Cooper T12-JAP | 0 laps, accident |

| Previous race: 1953 Madgwick Cup | Formula One non-championship races 1953 season | Next race: 1953 Curtis Trophy |
| Previous race: 1952 Joe Fry Memorial Trophy | Joe Fry Memorial Trophy | Next race: 1954 Joe Fry Memorial Trophy |
