= 1953 Richmond Trophy =

- Formula Libre race

Race details
- Date: 6 April 1953
- Official name: V Richmond Trophy
- Location: Goodwood Circuit, West Sussex
- Course: Permanent racing facility
- Course length: 3.830 km (2.388 miles)
- Distance: 15 laps, 57.45 km (35.82 miles)
- Weather: Cold and wet
- Attendance: 50,000

Pole position
Driver	(United Kingdom) Ken Wharton	BRM
- Time: 1:35.0

Fastest lap
Driver	(United Kingdom) Ken Wharton	BRM
- Time: 1:33.2

Podium
First	(United Kingdom) Ken Wharton	BRM
Second	(Italy) Piero Taruffi	Ferrari
Third	(Switzerland) Emmanuel de Graffenried	Maserati

The 5th Richmond Trophy was a Formula Libre motor race held at the Goodwood Circuit, West Sussex on 6 April 1953. The race was won from pole position by Ken Wharton in a BRM Type 15, setting fastest lap in the process. Piero Taruffi in the Thinwall Special Ferrari 375 was second and Emmanuel de Graffenried third in a Maserati A6GCM.

== Results ==
Pos	No	Driver	Entrant	Car	Time/Retired	Grid
1	2	(United Kingdom) Ken Wharton	A.G.B. Owen	BRM Type 15	23:53.0, 90.47mph	1
2	3	(Italy) Piero Taruffi	G.A. Vandervell	Thinwall Special Ferrari 375	+6.0s	5
3	5	(Switzerland) Emmanuel de Graffenried	Baron de Graffenried	Maserati A6GCM	+22.8s	7
4	21	(United Kingdom) Roy Salvadori	Connaught Engineering	Connaught A Type-Lea Francis	+54.4s	2
5	8	(United Kingdom) Tony Rolt	R.R.C. Walker	Connaught A Type-Lea Francis	+1:04.0	4
6	16	(United Kingdom) Bob Gerard	F.R. Gerard	Cooper T23-Bristol	+1:15.6	6
7	12	(United Kingdom) Ron Flockhart	W.R. Flockhart	ERA D-Type	+1 lap	8
Ret	27	(United Kingdom) John Coombs	Connaught Engineering	Connaught A Type-Lea Francis	8 laps	9
Ret	15	(United Kingdom) Peter Whitehead	Atlantic Stable	Cooper T24-Alta	6 laps	10
Ret	1	(United Kingdom) Reg Parnell	A.G.B. Owen	BRM Type 15	4 laps, supercharger drive	3
