= 1959 Glover Trophy =

- Non-championship race in the 1959 Formula One season

Race details
- Date: 30 March 1959
- Official name: VII Glover Trophy
- Location: Goodwood Circuit, West Sussex
- Course: Permanent racing facility
- Course length: 3.862 km (2.4 miles)
- Distance: 42 laps, 100.8 km (162.2 miles)

Pole position
Driver	(United States) Harry Schell	BRM
- Time: 1:39.0

Fastest lap
Driver	(United Kingdom) Stirling Moss	Cooper-Climax
- Time: 1:31.8

Podium
First	(United Kingdom) Stirling Moss	Cooper-Climax
Second	(Australia) Jack Brabham	Cooper-Climax
Third	(United States) Harry Schell	BRM

The 1959 Glover Trophy was a motor race, held on 30 March 1959 at Goodwood Circuit, England. To avoid competing with the Lavant Cup race the Glover Trophy was decreed to be strictly for Formula One cars only and as such, ran to Formula One rules. The race was watched by The 40,000 people, ran for 42 laps of the circuit, and was won by British driver Stirling Moss in a Cooper T51.

== Results ==
Pos	No.	Driver	Entrant	Constructor	Time/Retired	Grid
1	7	(United Kingdom) Stirling Moss	Rob Walker Racing Team	Cooper-Climax	1.06:58.0	5
2	10	(Australia) Jack Brabham	Cooper Car Company	Cooper-Climax	+ 16.6 s	3
3	1	(United States) Harry Schell	Owen Racing Organisation	BRM	+ 17.6 s	1
4	2	(Sweden) Jo Bonnier	Owen Racing Organisation	BRM	+ 18.2 s	4
5	8	(United States) Masten Gregory	Cooper Car Company	Cooper-Climax	41 laps	7
6	9	(New Zealand) Bruce McLaren	Cooper Car Company	Cooper-Climax	40 laps	6
7	4	(United Kingdom) Jack Fairman	Scuderia Centro Sud	Maserati	39 laps	12
8	11	(United Kingdom) Roy Salvadori	High Efficiency Motors	Cooper-Climax	39 laps	2
NC	15	(United Kingdom) David Piper	Dorchester Service Station	Lotus-Climax	36 laps	8
Ret	3	(Brazil) Hermano da Silva Ramos	Scuderia Centro Sud	Maserati	Accident	11
Ret	5	(Italy) Giorgio Scarlatti	Scuderia Ugolini	Maserati	Gearbox	9
Ret	12	(United Kingdom) Graham Hill	Team Lotus	Lotus-Climax	Brakes	13
Ret	6	(Australia) Ken Kavanagh	Ken Kavanagh	Maserati	Accident	10
DNA	14	(United States) Pete Lovely	Team Lotus	Lotus-Climax	No car	–

Previous race: 1958 Caen Grand Prix	Formula One non-championship races 1959 season	Next race: 1959 BARC Aintree 200
Previous race: 1958 Glover Trophy	Glover Trophy	Next race: 1960 Glover Trophy
