= 1961 Pau Grand Prix =

- Non-championship race in the 1961 Formula One season

Race details
- Date: 3 April 1961
- Official name: XXI Pau Grand Prix
- Location: Pau Circuit, Pau
- Course: Temporary street circuit
- Course length: 2.758 km (1.714 miles)
- Distance: 100 laps, 275.842 km (171.4 miles)

Pole position
Driver	(Australia) Jack Brabham	Cooper-Climax
- Time: 1:32.7

Fastest lap
Driver	(United Kingdom) Jim Clark	Lotus-Climax
- Time: 1:34.1

Podium
First	(United Kingdom) Jim Clark	Lotus-Climax
Second	(Sweden) Jo Bonnier	Lotus-Climax
Third	(Italy) Lorenzo Bandini	Cooper-Maserati

The 21st Pau Grand Prix was a non-Championship motor race, run to Formula One rules, held on 3 April 1961 at Pau Circuit, the street circuit in Pau. The race was run over 100 laps of the circuit, and was won by Jim Clark in a Lotus 18. This was Clark's first Formula One victory.

The cars entered by Scuderia Centro Sud were fitted with engines that were bigger than the 1.5 litres allowed by the regulations. Lorenzo Bandini had a 2.5-litre engine, and Mário Cabral a 2-litre.

== Results ==
Pos	Driver	Entrant	Constructor	Time/Retired	Grid
1	(United Kingdom) Jim Clark	Team Lotus	Lotus-Climax	2.39:35.5	2
2	(Sweden) Jo Bonnier	Scuderia Colonia	Lotus-Climax	+ 1:30.8 s	10
3	(Italy) Lorenzo Bandini	Scuderia Centro Sud	Cooper-Maserati	98 laps	5
4	(Portugal) Mário Cabral	Scuderia Centro Sud	Cooper-Maserati	97 laps	9
5	(United Kingdom) Jack Lewis	H & L Motors	Cooper-Climax	96 laps	4
6	(United Kingdom) Graham Eden	Graham Eden	Cooper-Climax	92 laps	12
7	(France) Jo Schlesser	Inter-Autocourse	Cooper-Climax	77 laps - Misfire	11
Ret	(France) Maurice Trintignant	Scuderia Serenissima	Cooper-Climax	Ignition	3
Ret	(United Kingdom) Trevor Taylor	Team Lotus	Lotus-Climax	Gearbox	6
Ret	(Germany) Wolfgang Seidel	Scuderia Colonia	Lotus-Climax	Gearbox	15
Ret	(Belgium) Olivier Gendebien	Equipe Nationale Belge	Emeryson-Maserati	Accident	8
Ret	(Belgium) Lucien Bianchi	Equipe Nationale Belge	Emeryson-Maserati	Accident	7
Ret	(United Kingdom) Ian Burgess	Camoradi International	Lotus-Climax	Gearbox	16
Ret	(Australia) Jack Brabham	Jack Brabham	Cooper-Climax	Fuel pump	1
Ret	(Switzerland) André Wicky	André Wicky	Cooper-Climax	Big-end bearings	14
Ret	(Italy) Gino Munaron	Gino Munaron	Cooper-Alfa Romeo	Con-rod	13
DNS	(France) François Santé	François Santé	Cooper-Climax	Engine in practice	-
WD	(United States) Masten Gregory	Camoradi International	Cooper-Climax	Car not ready	-
WD	(Germany) Wolfgang von Trips	Scuderia Colonia	Lotus-Climax	Seidel drove car	-
WD	(France) Bernard Collomb	Bernard Collomb	Cooper-Climax	No car	-

Previous race: 1961 Glover Trophy	Formula One non-championship races 1961 season	Next race: 1961 Lavant Cup
Previous race: 1957 Pau Grand Prix	Pau Grand Prix	Next race: 1962 Pau Grand Prix
