= 1962 International 2000 Guineas =

- Non-championship race in the 1962 Formula One season

Race details
- Date: 11 June 1962
- Official name: I International 2000 Guineas
- Location: Mallory Park, Leicestershire
- Course: Permanent racing facility
- Course length: 2.173 km (1.35 miles)
- Distance: 75 laps, 162.975 km (101.25 miles)

Pole position
Driver	(United Kingdom) Jim Clark	Lotus-Climax
- Time: 51.0

Fastest lap
Driver	(United Kingdom) John Surtees	Lola-Climax
- Time: 50.8

Podium
First	(United Kingdom) John Surtees	Lola-Climax
Second	(Australia) Jack Brabham	Lotus-Climax
Third	(United Kingdom) Graham Hill	Lotus-Climax

The 1st International 2000 Guineas was a motor race, for Formula One cars, held on Monday 11 June 1962 (the Whit Monday bank holiday in the UK) at Mallory Park, Leicestershire. The meeting was organised by the Nottingham Sports Car Club and live coverage was featured in the BBC's Bank Holiday Grandstand.

The race was run over 75 laps of the circuit, and was won by British driver John Surtees in a Lola Mk4.

This race represented the Formula One debut of Mike Parkes.

Another Formula One race was held on the same day, the 1962 Crystal Palace Trophy, at Crystal Palace Circuit.

== Results ==
Pos	No.	Driver	Entrant	Constructor	Time/Retired	Grid
1	4	(United Kingdom) John Surtees	Bowmaker Racing Team	Lola-Climax	1.05:03.6	4
2	8	(Australia) Jack Brabham	Brabham Racing Organisation	Lotus-Climax	+ 18.2 s	2
3	12	(United Kingdom) Graham Hill	Rob Walker Racing Team	Lotus-Climax	+ 28.2 s	3
4	2	(United Kingdom) Mike Parkes	Bowmaker Racing Team	Cooper-Climax	74 laps	10
5	7	(United States) Masten Gregory	UDT-Laystall Racing Team	Lotus-Climax	74 laps	7
6	10	(Sweden) Jo Bonnier	Scuderia SSS Republica di Venezia	Porsche	73 laps	5
7	11	(United Kingdom) Colin Davis	Scuderia SSS Republica di Venezia	Lotus-Climax	73 laps	12
8	1	(New Zealand) Tony Shelly	John Dalton	Lotus-Climax	72 laps	11
9	85	(Netherlands) Carel Godin de Beaufort	Ecurie Maarsbergen	Porsche	72 laps	6
10	15	(United Kingdom) Ian Burgess	Anglo-American Equipe	Cooper Special-Climax	71 laps	8
Ret	86	(United Kingdom) John Rhodes	Gerard Racing	Cooper-Ford	Ignition	9
Ret	6	(United Kingdom) Jim Clark	Team Lotus	Lotus-Climax	Oil pressure	1
Ret	3	(United Kingdom) John Dalton	Tim Parnell	Lotus-Climax	Fuel feed	13
WD	1	(United States) Phil Hill	SEFAC Ferrari	Ferrari	Entry taken by Dalton	-
WD	5	(United Kingdom) Peter Arundell	Team Lotus	Lotus	No car	-
WD	9	(United Kingdom) Tony Marsh	Tony Marsh	BRM	Car not ready	-

- Team Lotus also originally entered a car and an unnamed driver with No.14, but this entry was withdrawn.

Previous race: 1962 Naples Grand Prix	Formula One non-championship races 1962 season	Next race: 1962 Crystal Palace Trophy
Previous race: —	International 2000 Guineas	Next race: —
