= Gilby Engineering =

British general engineering company

Gilby
- Full name: Gilby Engineering
- Founder(s): Syd Greene
- Noted staff: Len Terry
- Noted drivers: (United Kingdom) Roy Salvadori (United Kingdom) Ivor Bueb (United Kingdom) Keith Greene

Formula One World Championship career
- First entry: 1954 French Grand Prix
- Races entered: 12 (10 starts)
- Constructors: Maserati, Cooper, Gilby
- Engines: Maserati I6, Climax I4, Maserati I4, BRM V8
- Constructors' Championships: 0
- Drivers' Championships: 0
- Race victories: 0
- Podiums: 0
- Points: 0
- Pole positions: 0
- Fastest laps: 0
- Final entry: 1962 Italian Grand Prix

Gilby Engineering was a British general engineering company and Formula One constructor owned by Syd Greene.

== History ==
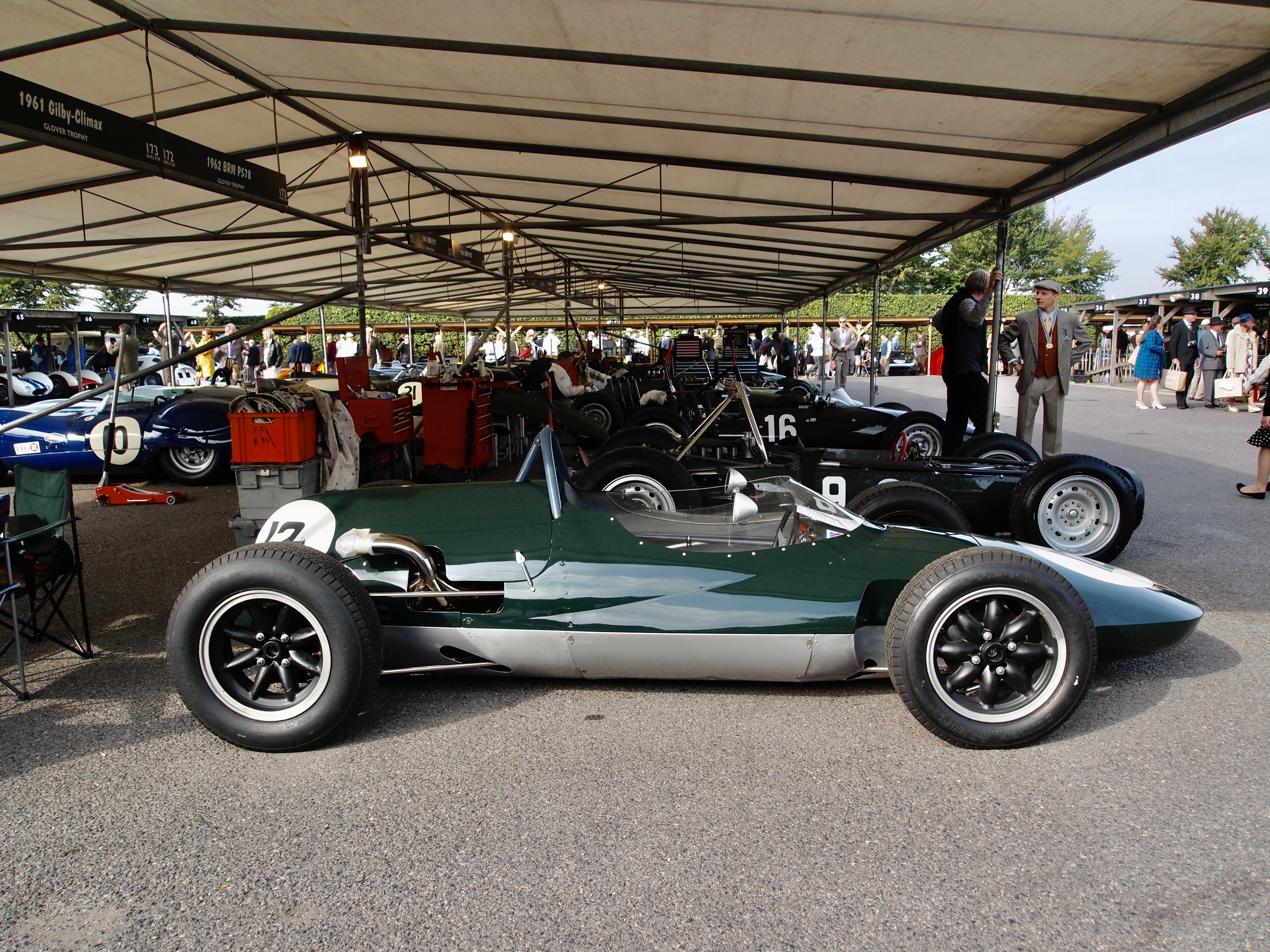
1961 model Gilby-Climax at the Goodwood Revival, 2014

Greene had lost an arm in a bicycle accident at 16 but went on to compete in many UK speed trials very successfully in the early 1950s. After he stopped competing, he fed his enthusiasm for motor racing by founding a motor racing team named after his company and later constructing the Gilby racing car. The team competed in 12 Formula One World Championship Grands Prix, including 6 with cars of their own construction, but scored no World Championship points. The Gilby cars were constructed by Syd Greene for his son Keith to drive, having previously entered a Maserati 250F for Roy Salvadori and Ivor Bueb and also a Cooper for Greene Jr. Keith Greene later became better known as a team manager in Formula One and sports car racing. Gilby made its debut in the 1954 French Grand Prix with the Maserati, for Salvadori, who also drove for the team in 1955 and 1956, and the team's last event was the 1962 Italian Grand Prix. After the team ceased competing in Formula One, the final Gilby car was purchased and entered in three events in 1963 by privateer Ian Raby. Keith Greene achieved a third-place finish in the non-championship Naples Grand Prix of 1962, with the BRM-engined car, behind the works Ferrari's of Willy Mairesse and Lorenzo Bandini.

== Complete Formula One World Championship results ==
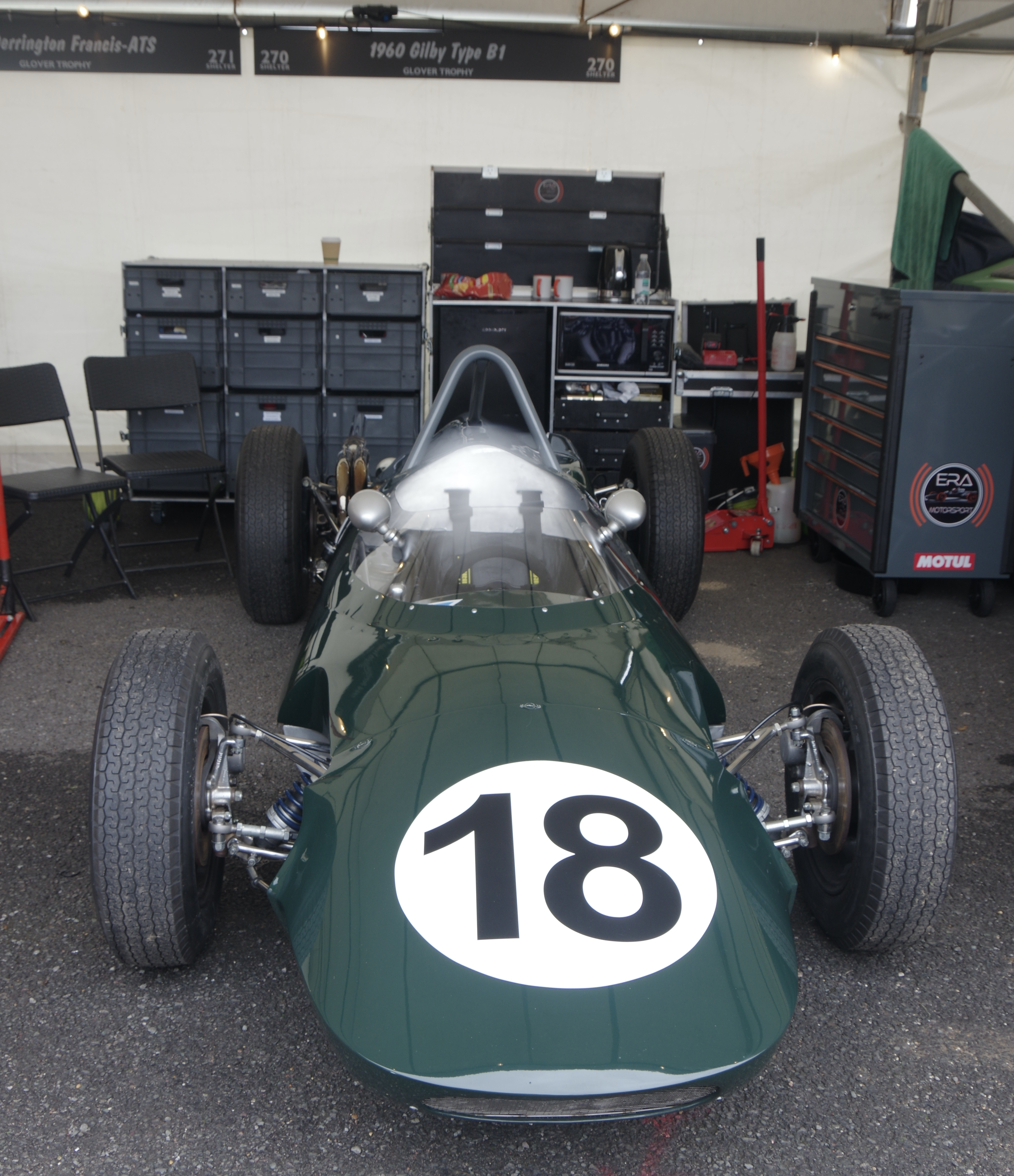
1960 Gilby B1

=== Non-constructor entries ===
(key)

| Year | Chassis | Engine | Tyres | Drivers | 1 | 2 | 3 | 4 | 5 | 6 | 7 | 8 | 9 | 10 | Points | WCC |
|---|---|---|---|---|---|---|---|---|---|---|---|---|---|---|---|---|
| 1954 | Maserati 250F | Maserati I6 | D | | ARG | 500 | BEL | FRA | GBR | GER | SUI | ITA | ESP | | -* | n/a* |
| 1954 | Maserati 250F | Maserati I6 | D | Roy Salvadori | | | | Ret | Ret | | | | | | -* | n/a* |
| 1955 | Maserati 250F | Maserati I6 | D | | ARG | MON | 500 | BEL | NED | GBR | ITA | | | | -* | n/a* |
| 1955 | Maserati 250F | Maserati I6 | D | Roy Salvadori | | | | | | Ret | | | | | -* | n/a* |
| 1956 | Maserati 250F | Maserati I6 | D | | ARG | MON | 500 | BEL | FRA | GBR | GER | ITA | | | -* | n/a* |
| 1956 | Maserati 250F | Maserati I6 | D | Roy Salvadori | | | | | | Ret | Ret | 11 | | | -* | n/a* |
| 1957 | Maserati 250F | Maserati I6 | D | | ARG | MON | 500 | FRA | GBR | GER | PES | ITA | | | -* | n/a* |
| 1957 | Maserati 250F | Maserati I6 | D | Ivor Bueb | | | | | NC | | | | | | -* | n/a* |
| 1959 | Cooper T43 | Climax I4 | D | | MON | 500 | NED | FRA | GBR | GER | POR | ITA | USA | | -* | n/a* |
| 1959 | Cooper T43 | Climax I4 | D | Keith Greene | | | | | DNQ | | | | | | -* | n/a* |
| 1960 | Cooper T45 | Maserati I4 | D | | ARG | MON | 500 | NED | BEL | FRA | GBR | POR | ITA | USA | -* | n/a* |
| 1960 | Cooper T45 | Maserati I4 | D | Keith Greene | | | | | | | Ret | | | | -* | n/a* |
| 1961 | Gilby 61 | Climax I4 | D | | MON | NED | BEL | FRA | GBR | GER | ITA | USA | | | 0 | NC |
| 1961 | Gilby 61 | Climax I4 | D | Keith Greene | | | | | 15 | | | | | | 0 | NC |
| 1962 | Gilby 62 | BRM V8 | D | | NED | MON | BEL | FRA | GBR | GER | ITA | USA | RSA | | 0 | NC |
| 1962 | Gilby 62 | BRM V8 | D | Keith Greene | | | | | | Ret | DNQ | | | | 0 | NC |

* Gilby did not compete as a constructor

=== Constructor entries ===
(key)

| Year | Entrant | Chassis | Engine | Tyres | Drivers | 1 | 2 | 3 | 4 | 5 | 6 | 7 | 8 | 9 | 10 |
|---|---|---|---|---|---|---|---|---|---|---|---|---|---|---|---|
| 1963 | Ian Raby | Gilby 62 | BRM V8 | D | | MON | BEL | NED | FRA | GBR | GER | ITA | USA | MEX | RSA |
| 1963 | Ian Raby | Gilby 62 | BRM V8 | D | Ian Raby | | | | | Ret | DNQ | DNQ | | | |
