= Emeryson =

British racing car manufacturer

Emeryson as a Formula One chassis constructor
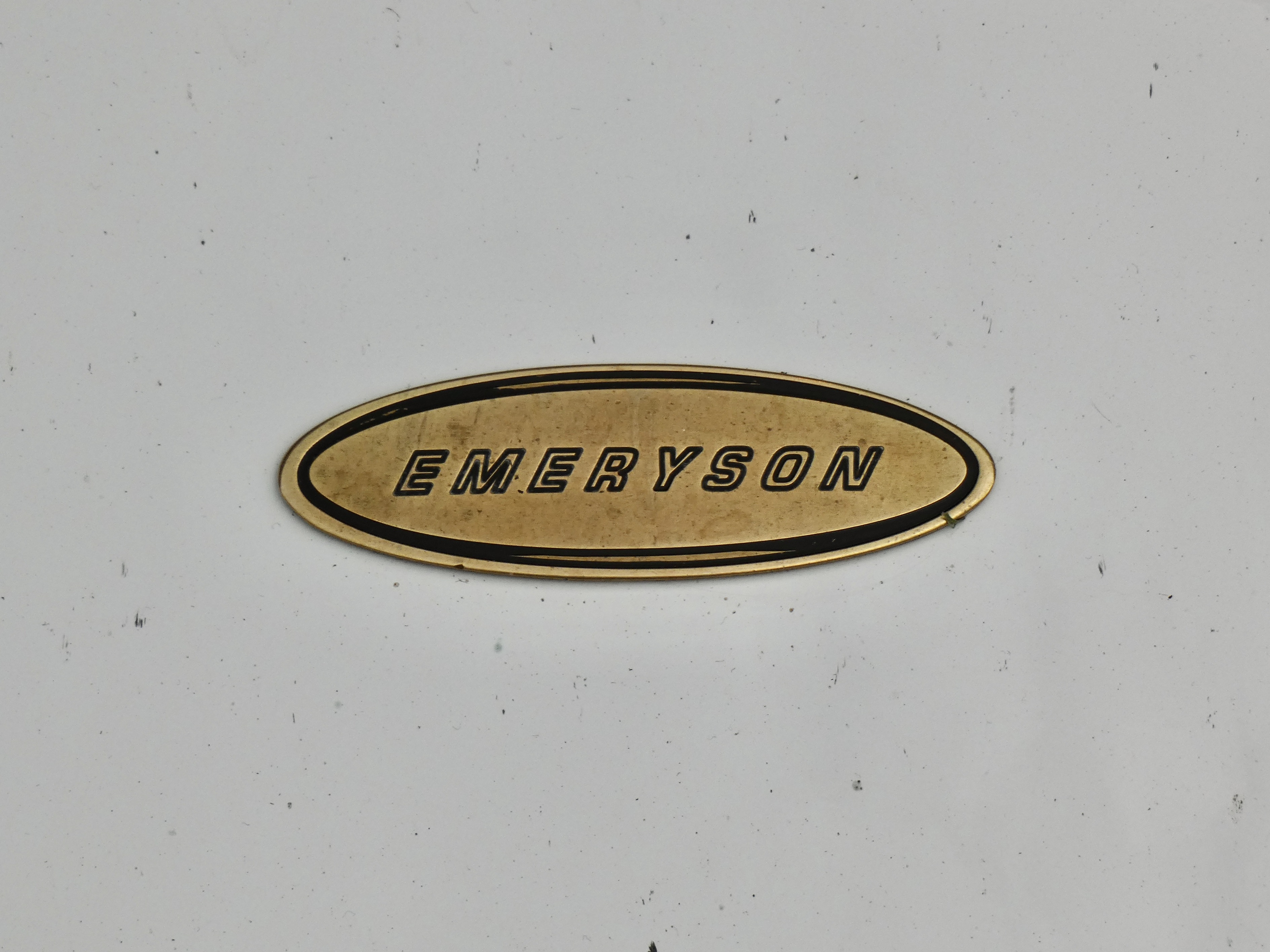
- Founder(s): Paul Emery

Formula One World Championship career
- Engines: Alta S4, Climax S4, Maserati S4
- Entrants: Emeryson, André Pilette, Ecurie Nationale Belge, Ecurie Maarsbergen
- First entry: 1956 British Grand Prix
- Last entry: 1962 Monaco Grand Prix
- Races entered: 7 (4 starts)
- Race victories: 0
- Constructors' Championships: 0
- Drivers' Championships: 0
- Pole positions: 0
- Fastest laps: 0

Emeryson was a Formula One constructor briefly in 1956, and then again briefly in 1961 and 1962.

== History ==
The company was named for Paul Emery, whose father George had built specials before the war; in 1948, one of the specials was extended to take a 4 litre Duesenberg engine for the Northern Irish racer Bobbie Baird, and entered for the 1948 British Grand Prix, but various issues prevented the car from starting.

In 1949, George and his brother Peter built a 500cc formula racing car, which Paul raced. The company continued building cars to the formula for much of the 1950s, while Paul himself built an Alta-engined Formula 2 car in 1953, followed by an Aston Martin-engined special which qualified for the new Formula 1 in 1954.

The car made its Formula 1 debut in the hands of Colin Chapman at the 1954 BRDC International Trophy, but, proving slow and unreliable, finished 17th and last, so Emery replaced the engine with an Alta engine bored out to 2.5 litres. In this configuration, the car proved much more of a prospect, Emery finishing second in the London Trophy at Crystal Palace in 1956 after dicing for the win with Stirling Moss' Maserati 250F, and Emery made his sole world championship start in the 1956 British Grand Prix, albeit retiring early with an ignition problem after running last.

In 1960, Emery teamed up with Alan Brown and planned a run of 50 two-litre racing cars. The outcome was a run of Formula Junior cars and a new Formula 1 model, with a Coventry Climax engine; the Ecurie Nationale Belge team bought three cars, fitting two with Maserati engines, and one of the latter recorded a 4th place in the 1961 Brussels Grand Prix with Lucien Bianchi driving.

During the year, American heir Hugh Powell bought the company with a view to running Tony Settember in the car. Settember was joined by John Campbell-Jones in 1962 and by the end of the year the cars had been modified into the new Scirocco marque.

== Complete Formula One World Championship results ==
=== Works entries ===
(key)

Year	Chassis	Engine	Tyres	Drivers	1	2	3	4	5	6	7	8	9	Points	WCC
1956	Emeryson Mk1	Alta S4	D		ARG	MON	500	BEL	FRA	GBR	GER	ITA		-*	-*
1956	Emeryson Mk1	Alta S4	D	Paul Emery						Ret				-*	-*
1962	Emeryson Mk2	Climax S4	D		NED	MON	BEL	FRA	GBR	GER	ITA	USA	RSA	0	NC
1962	Emeryson Mk2	Climax S4	D	Tony Settember					11		Ret			0	NC

* Constructors' Championship not awarded until 1958

=== Results of other Emeryson cars ===
(key)

Year	Entrant	Chassis	Engine	Tyres	Drivers	1	2	3	4	5	6	7	8	9
1961						MON	NED	BEL	FRA	GBR	GER	ITA	USA	
1961	Equipe Nationale Belge	Emeryson P	Climax S4	D	André Pilette							DNQ		
1961	Equipe Nationale Belge	Emeryson 1001; Emeryson Mk2	Maserati S4	D	Lucien Bianchi	DNQ								
1961	Equipe Nationale Belge	Emeryson 1001; Emeryson Mk2	Maserati S4	D	Olivier Gendebien	DNQ								
1962						NED	MON	BEL	FRA	GBR	GER	ITA	USA	RSA
1962	Ecurie Maarsbergen	Emeryson 1006	Climax S4	D	Wolfgang Seidel	NC								

== Gallery ==
Emeryson racing cars
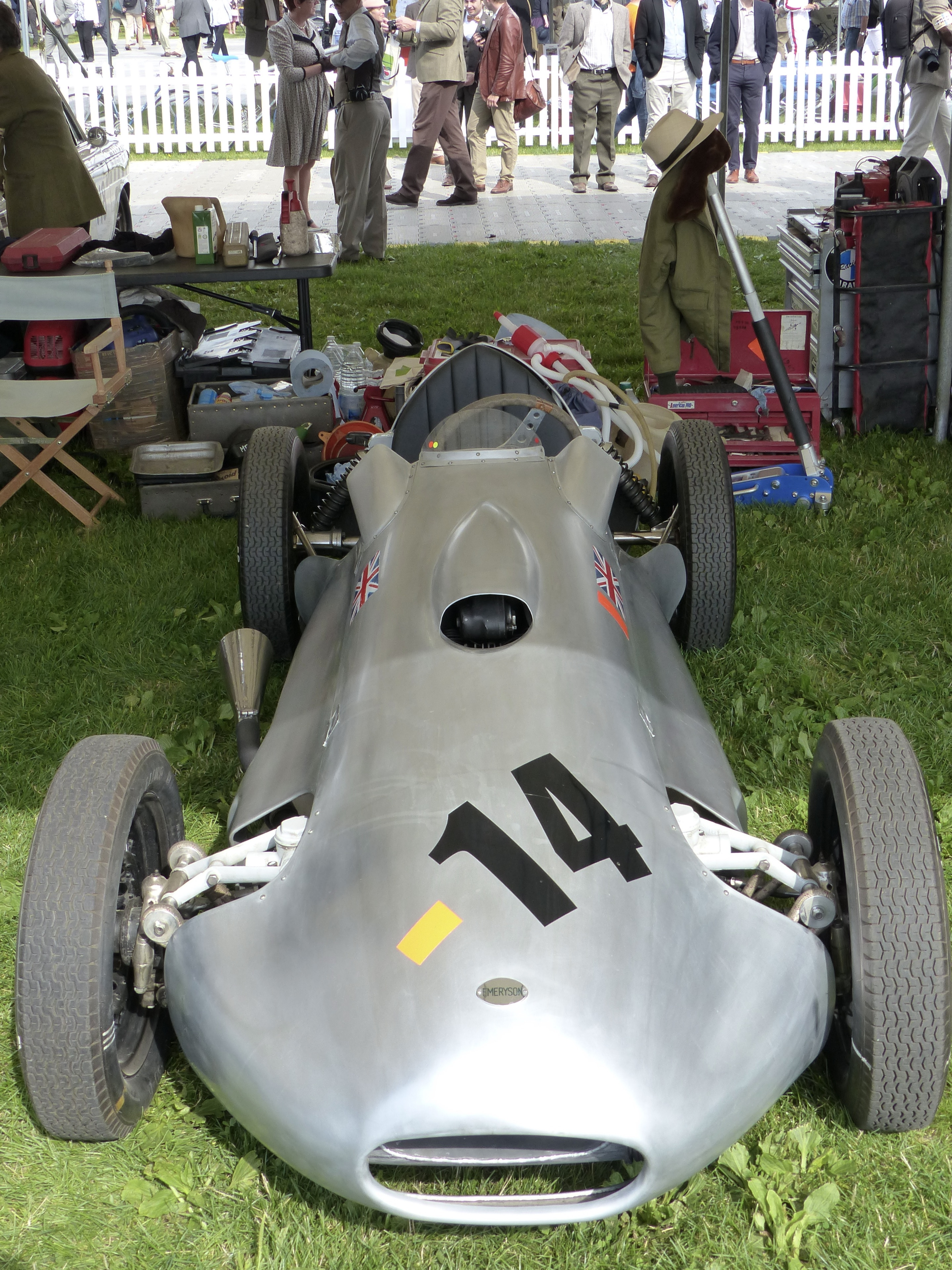
1953 Emeryson F3 car

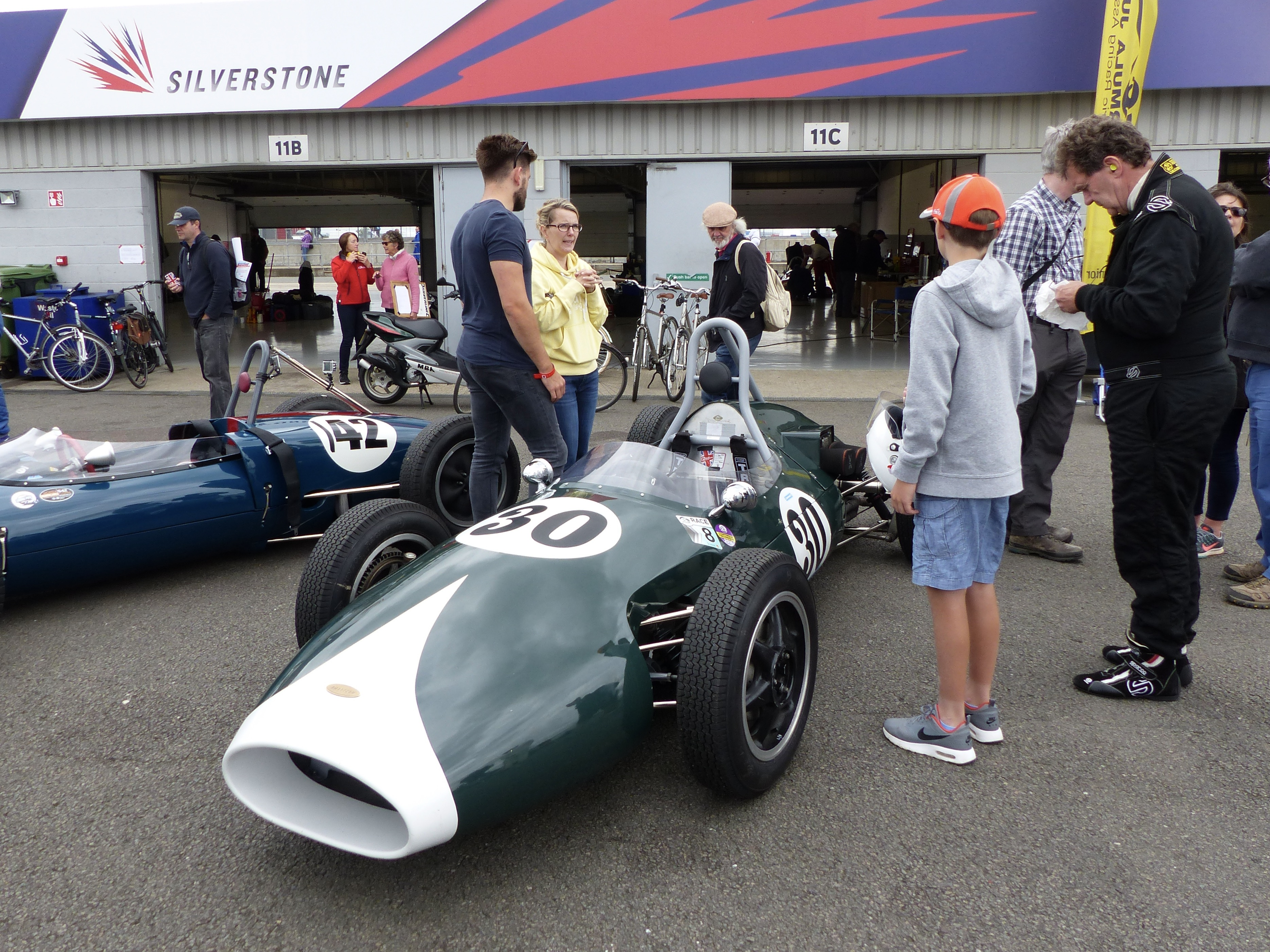
1960 Emeryson FJ car

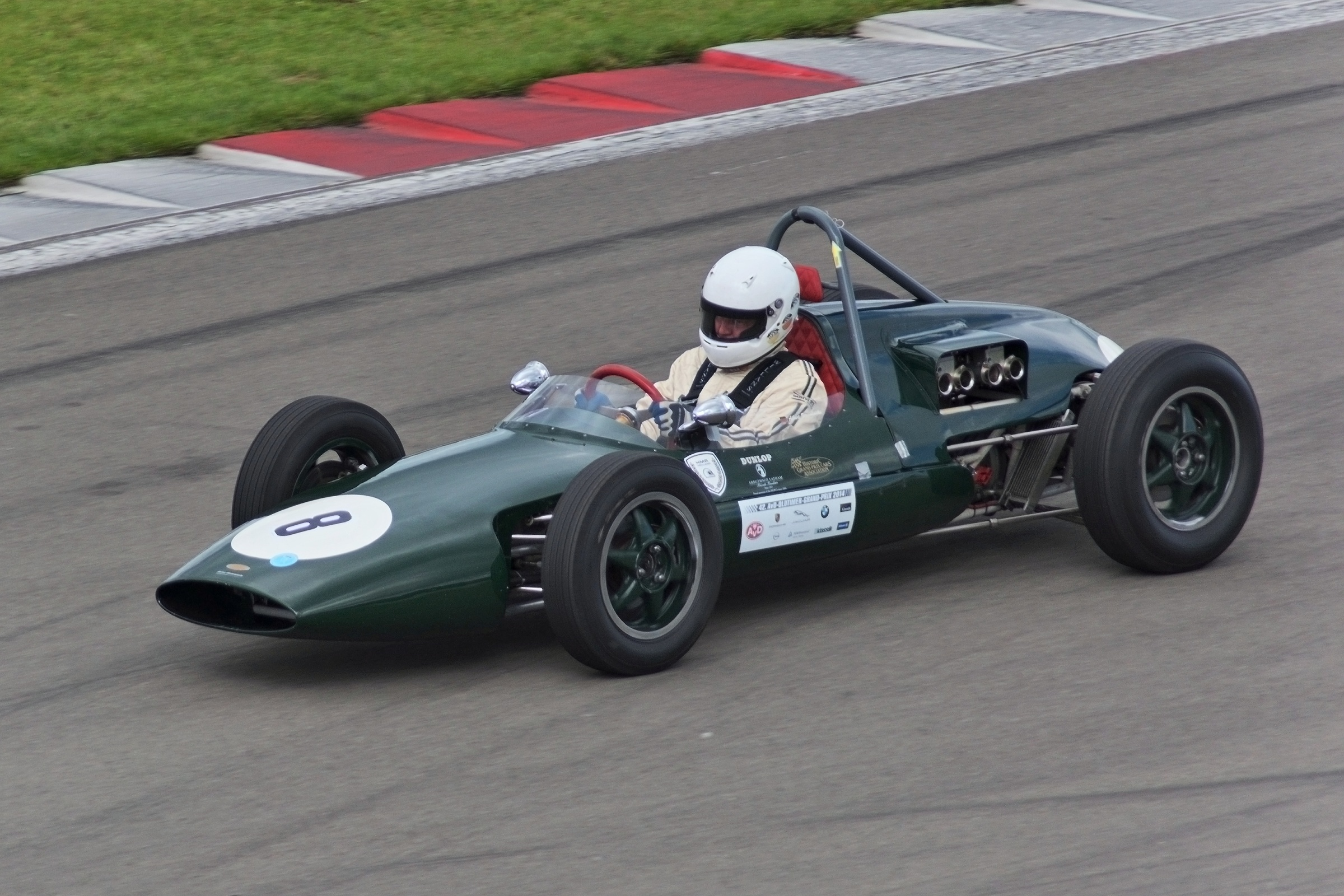
1961 Emeryson F1 car

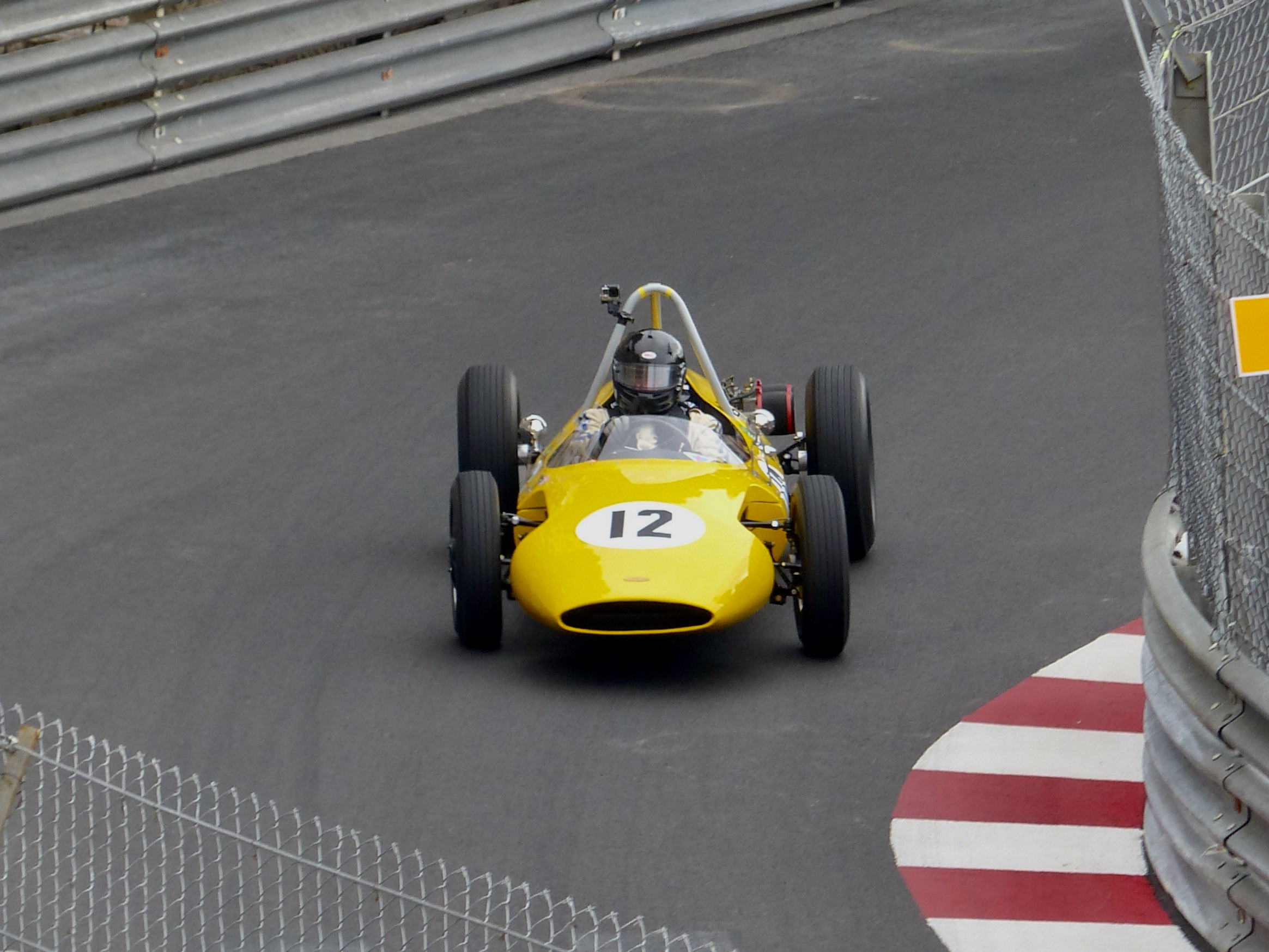
1961 Emeryson-Climax in ENB colours
