= Bruce Johnstone (racing driver) =

South African racing driver (1937–2022)

- Born: 30 January 1937; Durban, South Africa
- Died: 3 March 2022 (aged 85); Cape Town, South Africa

Formula One World Championship career
- Nationality: (South Africa) South African
- Active years: 1962
- Team: BRM
- Entries: 1
- Championships: 0
- Wins: 0
- Podiums: 0
- Career points: 0
- Pole positions: 0
- Fastest laps: 0
- First entry: 1962 South African Grand Prix

William Bruce Gordon Johnstone (30 January 1937 – 3 March 2022) was a South African racing driver. He participated in one Formula One (F1) World Championship Grand Prix, on 29 December 1962. He scored no championship points. He also competed in the F1 non-championship 1962 Oulton Park Gold Cup where he finished fourth and in the South African Formula 1 Championship.

Johnstone died on 3 March 2022, at the age of 85.

== Complete Formula One World Championship results ==
(key)

Year	Entrant	Chassis	Engine	1	2	3	4	5	6	7	8	9	WDC	Points
1962	Owen Racing Organisation	BRM P48/57	BRM V8	NED	MON	BEL	FRA	GBR	GER	ITA	USA	RSA; 9	NC	0
