= Lotus 21 =

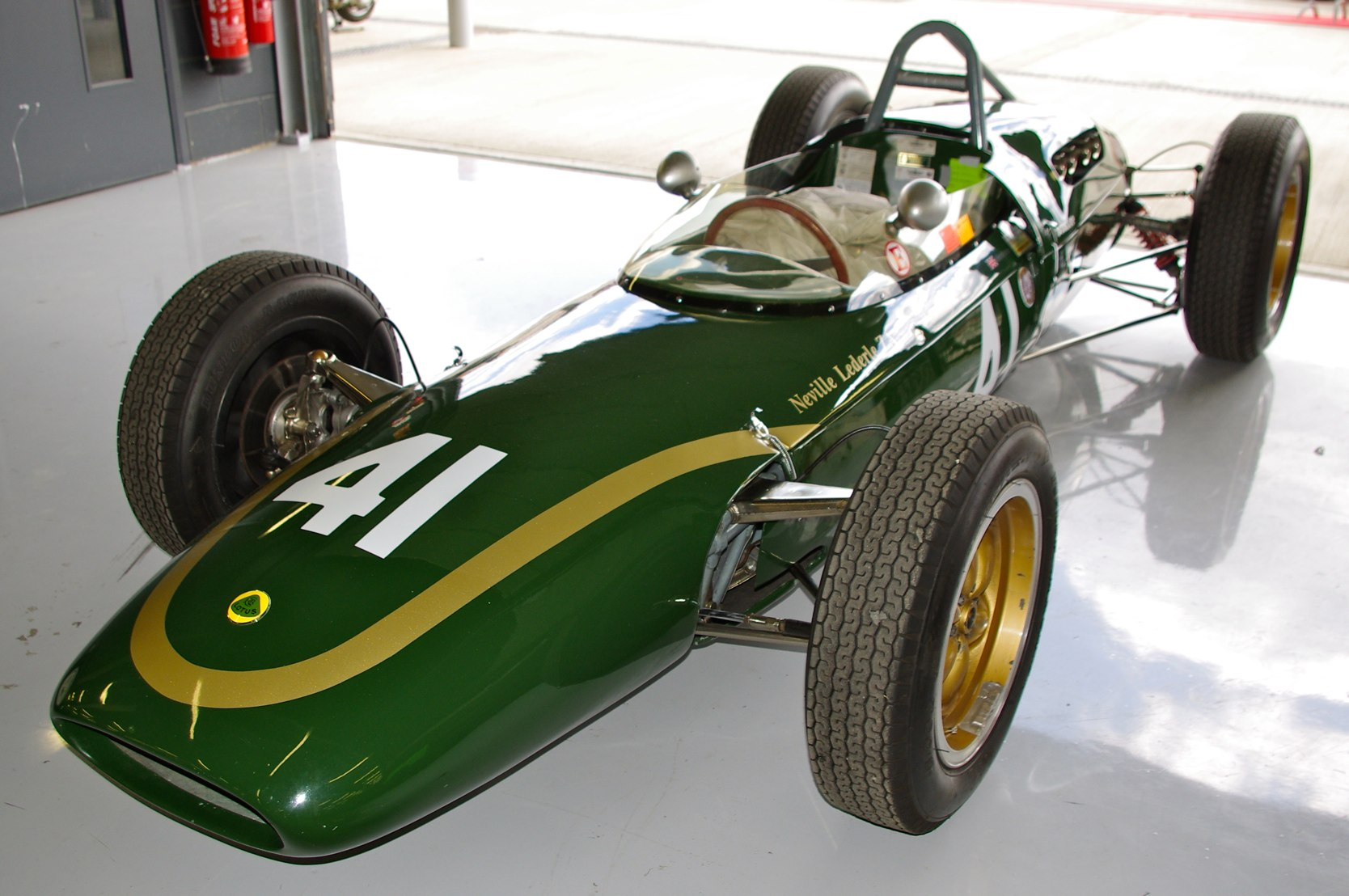

Overview
- Manufacturer: Team Lotus
- Production: 1961

Body and chassis
- Class: Formula One
- Body style: Open wheel

Powertrain
- Engine: Coventry Climax FPF
- Transmission: ZF 5DS10

Chronology
- Predecessor: Lotus 18
- Successor: Lotus 24 / Lotus 25

The Lotus 21 was a Formula One racing car designed by Colin Chapman. It was a mid-engined design using a tubular spaceframe structure skinned with fibreglass panels, of a more advanced build than seen in the Lotus 18. Powered by the 1.5-litre Coventry Climax FPF 4-cylinder engine, it used disc brakes all round.

Used by the works Lotus team and the privateer Rob Walker Racing Team in 1961, the 21 was the first works Lotus to win a Formula One Grand Prix, in the hands of Innes Ireland at the 1961 United States Grand Prix. (Previous victories were taken by Rob Walker's team). Customer teams continued to use it up to 1965. It was soon rendered obsolete by the Lotus 24 and the monocoque Lotus 25 introduced for the 1962 Formula One season.

== Scale models and die cast ==
- Meccano Dinky Toys; No. 241 (production 1963–1969), approximately O scale (1:44).

== Complete Formula One World Championship results ==
Year	Entrant	Engine	Tyre	Driver(s)	1	2	3	4	5	6	7	8	9	10	Points	WCC
1961	Team Lotus	Climax FPF 1.5 L4	D		MON	NED	BEL	FRA	GBR	GER	ITA	USA			32^{1}	2nd
1961	Team Lotus	Climax FPF 1.5 L4	D	(United Kingdom) Jim Clark	10	3^{F}	12	3	Ret	4	Ret	7			32^{1}	2nd
1961	Team Lotus	Climax FPF 1.5 L4	D	(United Kingdom) Innes Ireland	DNS		Ret	4	10	NC		1			32^{1}	2nd
1961	R.R.C. Walker Racing Team	Climax FPF 1.5 L4	D	(United Kingdom) Stirling Moss							Ret				32^{1}	2nd
1962	Ecurie Nationale Suisse	Climax FPF 1.5 L4	D		NED	MON	BEL	FRA	GBR	GER	ITA	USA	RSA		36 (38)^{2}	2nd
1962	Ecurie Nationale Suisse	Climax FPF 1.5 L4	D	(Switzerland) Jo Siffert		DNQ									36 (38)^{2}	2nd
1962	Ecurie Filipinetti	Climax FPF 1.5 L4	D	(Switzerland) Jo Siffert			10			12					36 (38)^{2}	2nd
1962	Jim Hall	Climax FPF 1.5 L4	D	(United States) Jim Hall								DNS			36 (38)^{2}	2nd
1962	Ernie Pieterse	Climax FPF 1.5 L4	D	(South Africa) Ernie Pieterse									10		36 (38)^{2}	2nd
1962	Neville Lederle	Climax FPF 1.5 L4	D	(South Africa) Neville Lederle									6		36 (38)^{2}	2nd
1963	Lawson Organisation	Climax FPF 1.5 L4	D		NED	MON	BEL	FRA	GBR	GER	ITA	USA	MEX	RSA	54 (74)^{2}	1st
1963	Lawson Organisation	Climax FPF 1.5 L4	D	(South Africa) Ernie Pieterse										Ret	54 (74)^{2}	1st
1965	Lawson Organisation	Climax FPF 1.5 L4	D		RSA	MON	BEL	FRA	GBR	NED	GER	ITA	USA	MEX	54 (58)^{2}	1st
1965	Lawson Organisation	Climax FPF 1.5 L4	D	(South Africa) Ernie Pieterse	DNQ										54 (58)^{2}	1st
1965	Scuderia Scribante	Climax FPF 1.5 L4	D	(South Africa) Neville Lederle	DNQ										54 (58)^{2}	1st

^{1} 17 points were scored using the Lotus 21, the other 15 points were scored using other Lotus models
^{2} All points were scored using other Lotus models
