= 1962 Lombank Trophy =

- Non-championship race in the 1962 Formula One season

Race details
- Date: 14 April 1962
- Official name: III Lombank Trophy
- Location: Snetterton Motor Racing Circuit, Norfolk
- Course: Permanent racing facility
- Course length: 4.361 km (2.71 miles)
- Distance: 50 laps, 218.07 km (135.5 miles)

Pole position
| Driver | (United Kingdom) Stirling Moss | Lotus-Climax |
- Time: 1:34.2

Fastest lap
| Driver | (United Kingdom) Stirling Moss | Lotus-Climax |
- Time: 1:33.6

Podium
| First | (United Kingdom) Jim Clark | Lotus-Climax |
| Second | (United Kingdom) Graham Hill | BRM |
| Third | (Sweden) Jo Bonnier | Porsche |

The 3rd Lombank Trophy was a motor race, run for cars complying with Formula One rules, held on 14 April 1962 at Snetterton Motor Racing Circuit, England. The race was run over 50 laps of the circuit, and was won by British driver Jim Clark in a Lotus 24.

After Graham Hill had led for the first five laps, Stirling Moss passed him and stretched ahead, his car using the new Coventry Climax V8 engine. However, he experienced throttle problems after 17 laps and had to make a number of pitstops, leaving Clark to dominate the rest of the race. Clark's car was the only other Climax-engined runner to use the new V8 engine.

Prior to the race, two of the entrants withdrew after accidents: Richie Ginther crashed his BRM P57 in testing and suffered injuries which left him unable to race, and Jack Brabham's Lotus 21 had been damaged in a fire at his workshop.

== Results ==
| Pos | No. | Driver | Entrant | Constructor | Time/Retired | Grid |
|---|---|---|---|---|---|---|
| 1 | 3 | (United Kingdom) Jim Clark | Team Lotus | Lotus-Climax | 1.20:25.6 | 2 |
| 2 | 9 | (United Kingdom) Graham Hill | Owen Racing Organisation | BRM | + 57.4 s | 3 |
| 3 | 2 | (Sweden) Jo Bonnier | Scuderia SSS Republica di Venezia | Porsche | 49 laps | 8 |
| 4 | 20 | (United Kingdom) Keith Greene | Gilby Engineering | Gilby-Climax | 49 laps | 10 |
| 5 | 15 | (New Zealand) Tony Shelly | John Dalton | Lotus-Climax | 47 laps | 12 |
| 6 | 17 | (Germany) Wolfgang Seidel | Autosport Team Wolfgang Seidel | Porsche | 46 laps | 13 |
| 7 | 7 | (United Kingdom) Stirling Moss | UDT-Laystall Racing Team | Lotus-Climax | 45 laps | 1 |
| 8 | 18 | (United Kingdom) Chris Ashmore | Gerry Ashmore | Cooper-Climax | 42 laps | 15 |
| Ret | 14 | (United Kingdom) Tim Parnell | Tim Parnell | Lotus-Climax | Overheating | 9 |
| Ret | 12 | (United Kingdom) John Surtees | Bowmaker Racing Team | Lola-Climax | Overheating | 4 |
| Ret | 16 | (United Kingdom) Graham Eden | Gerry Ashmore | Emeryson-Climax | Clutch | 14 |
| Ret | 4 | (United Kingdom) Trevor Taylor | Team Lotus | Lotus-Climax | Engine | 7 |
| Ret | 6 | (United Kingdom) Innes Ireland | UDT-Laystall Racing Team | Lotus-Climax | Accident | 6 |
| Ret | 8 | (United States) Masten Gregory | UDT-Laystall Racing Team | Lotus-Climax | Accident | 5 |
| Ret | 11 | (United Kingdom) Roy Salvadori | Bowmaker Racing Team | Cooper-Climax | Engine | 11 |
| WD | 1 | (Australia) Jack Brabham | Brabham Racing Organisation | Lotus-Climax | Car damaged | - |
| WD | 5 | (United Kingdom) Peter Arundell | Team Lotus | Lotus-Climax | No car | - |
| WD | 10 | (United States) Richie Ginther | Owen Racing Organisation | BRM | Driver unfit | - |
| WD | 19 | (New Zealand) Ross Greenville | Ross Greenville | Cooper-Climax | Driver unfit | - |
| WD | 21 | (United Kingdom) Ian Burgess | Anglo-American Equipe | Cooper-Climax | Car not ready | - |
| WD | 22 | (United States) Tony Settember | Emeryson Cars | Emeryson-Climax | Car not ready | - |

| Previous race: 1962 Brussels Grand Prix | Formula One non-championship races 1962 season | Next race: 1962 Lavant Cup |
| Previous race: 1961 Lombank Trophy | Lombank Trophy | Next race: 1963 Lombank Trophy |
