= 1962 Formula One season =

16th season of FIA Formula One motor racing

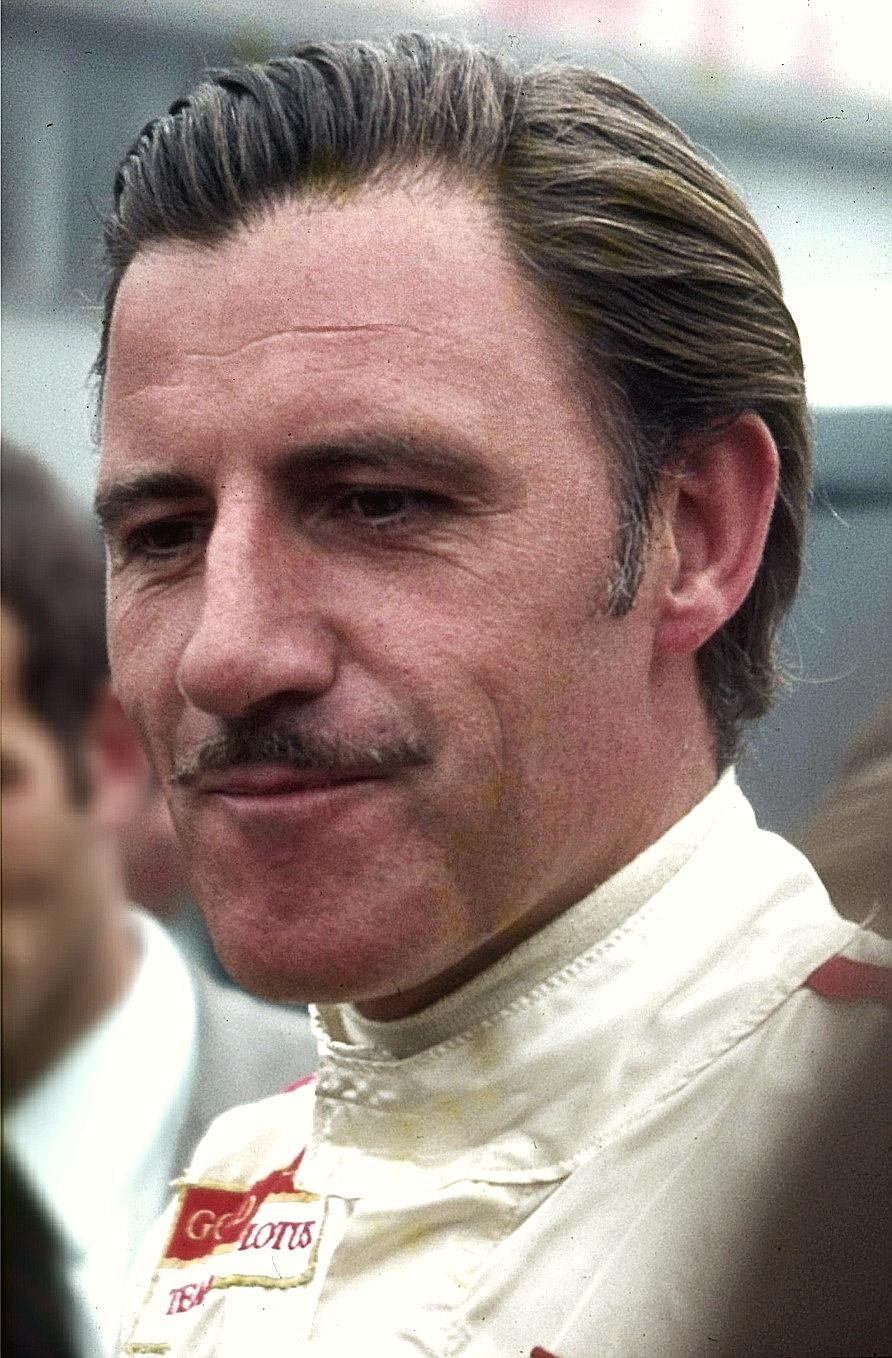
Graham Hill won the first of his two championships, driving for BRM.

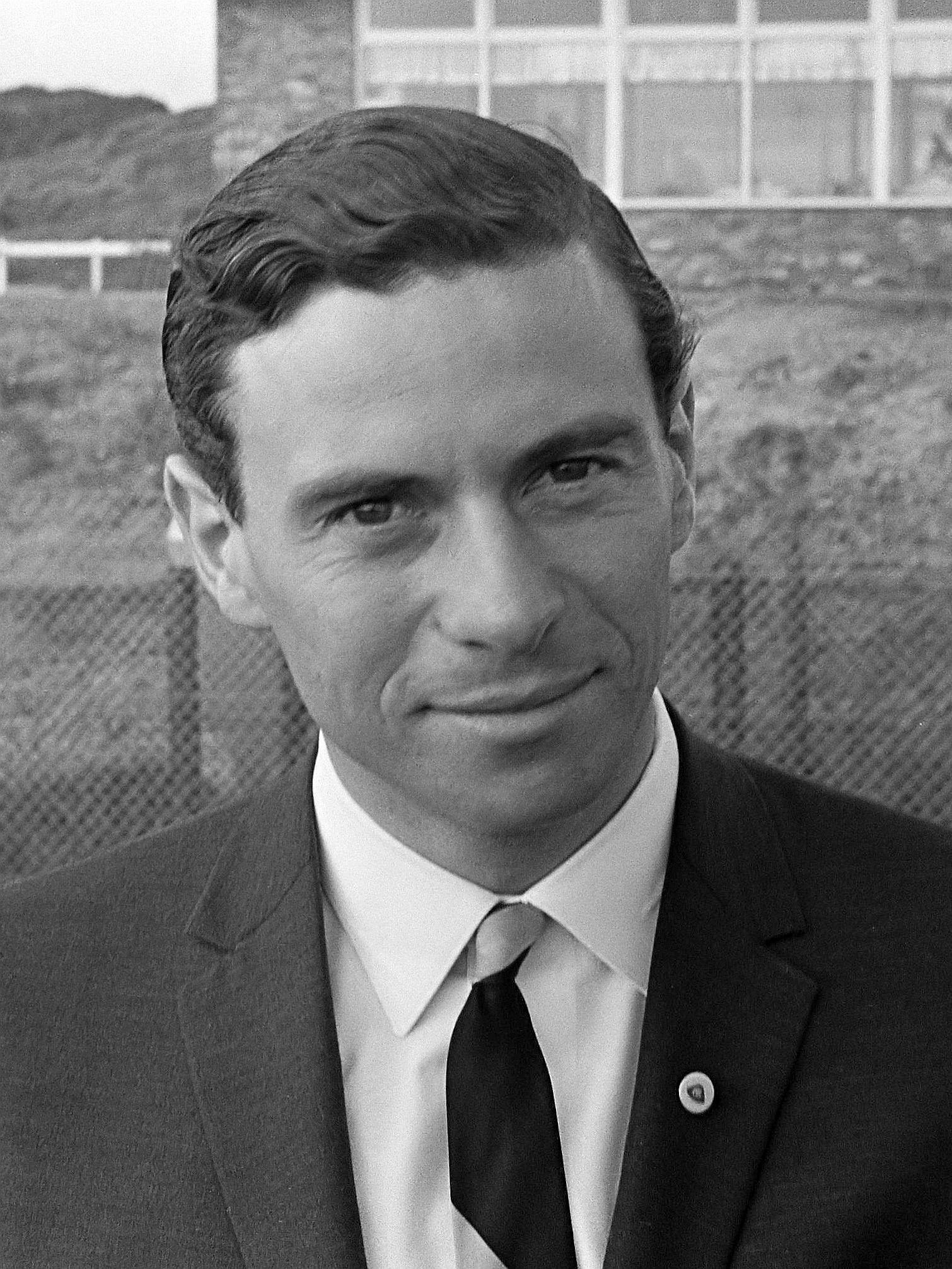
Jim Clark (pictured in 1965) finished as runner-up in the World Drivers' Championship.

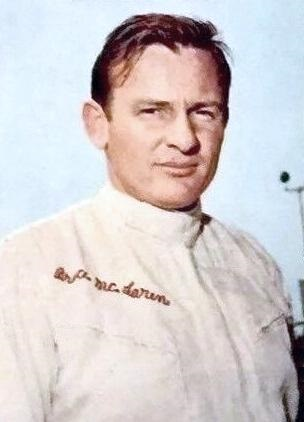
Bruce McLaren finished third in the World Drivers' Championship.

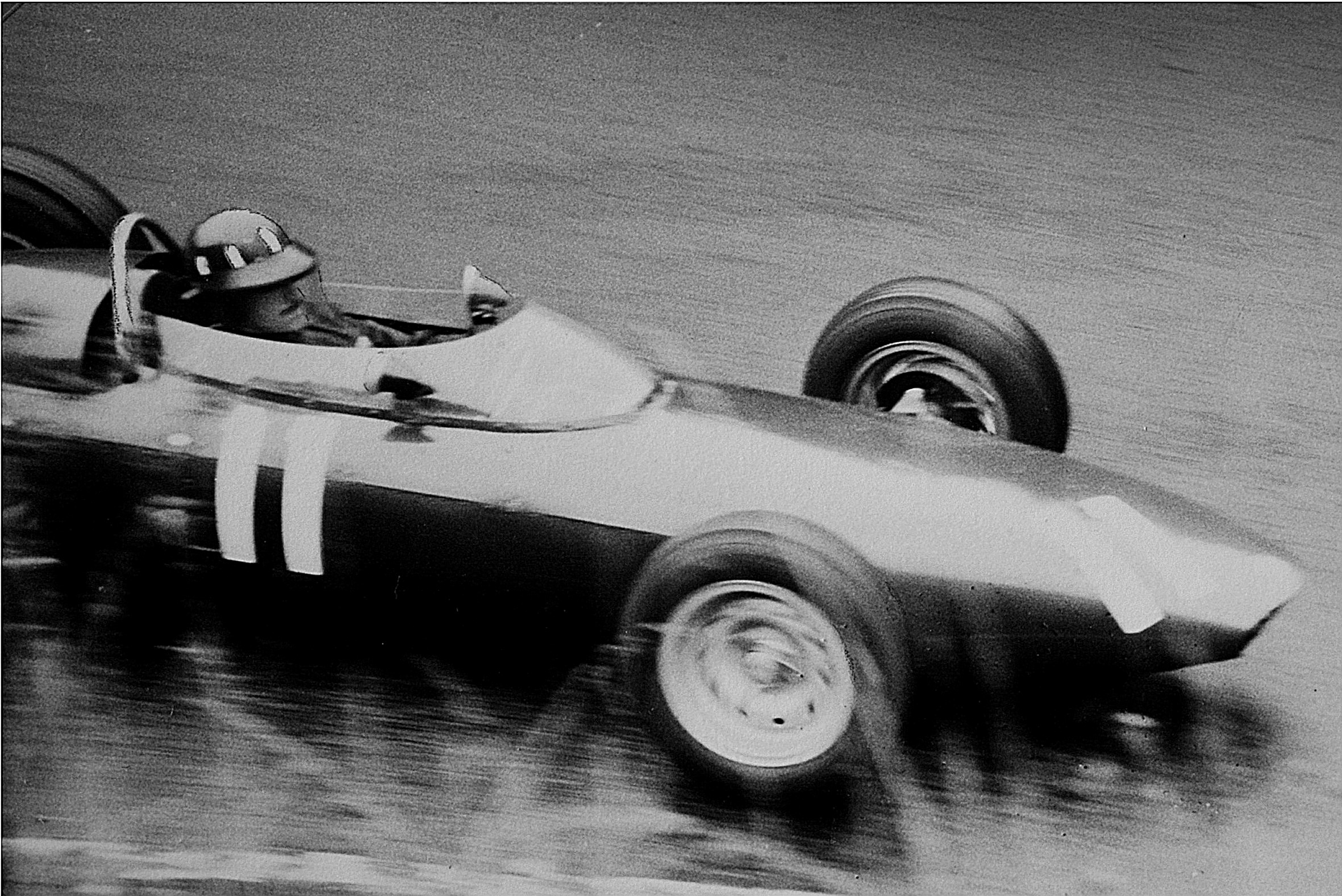
BRM won the International Cup for F1 Manufacturers with the BRM P48/57 & P57.

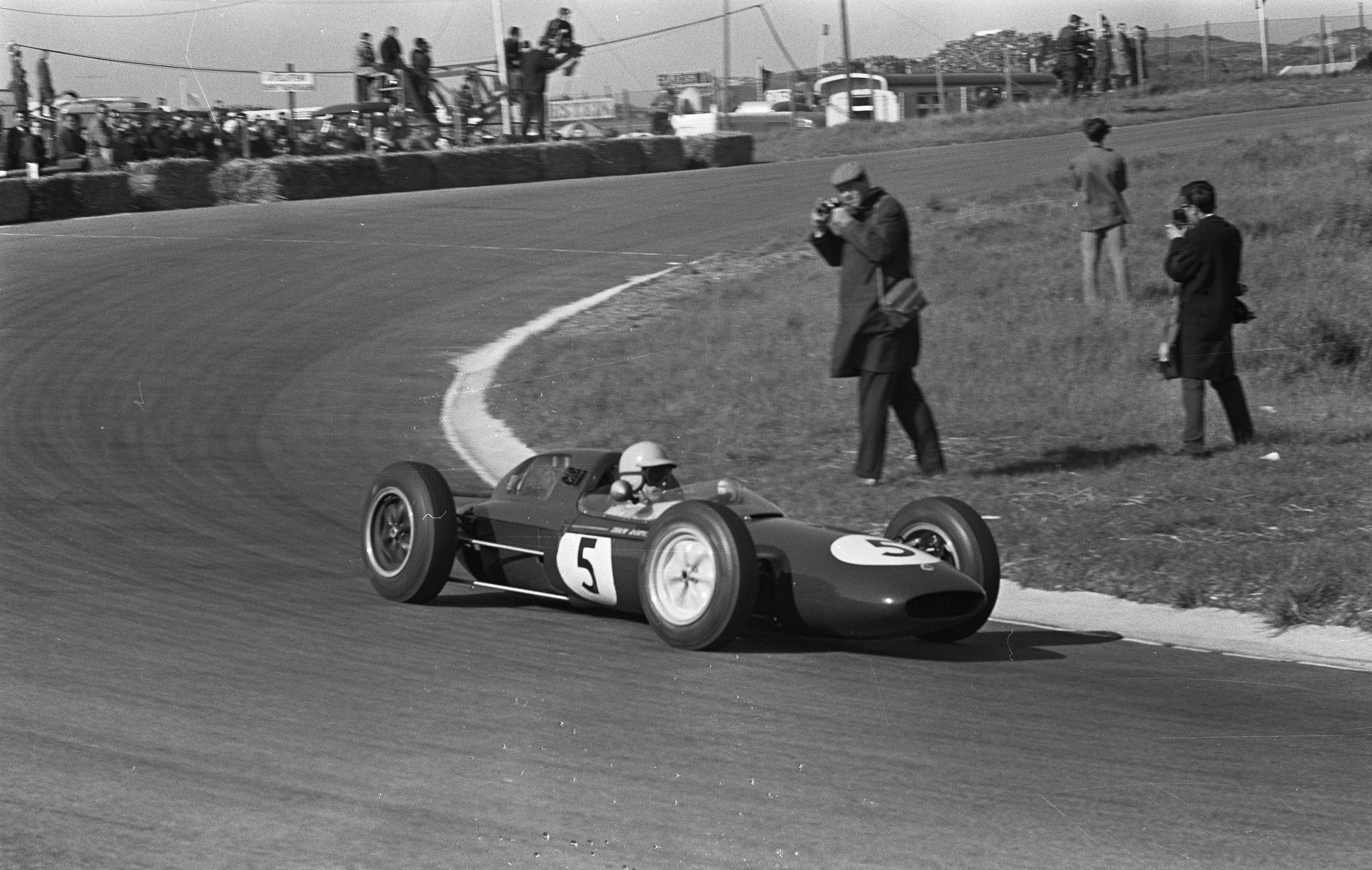
Lotus finished second in the International Cup for F1 Manufacturers with the Lotus 24 and 25.

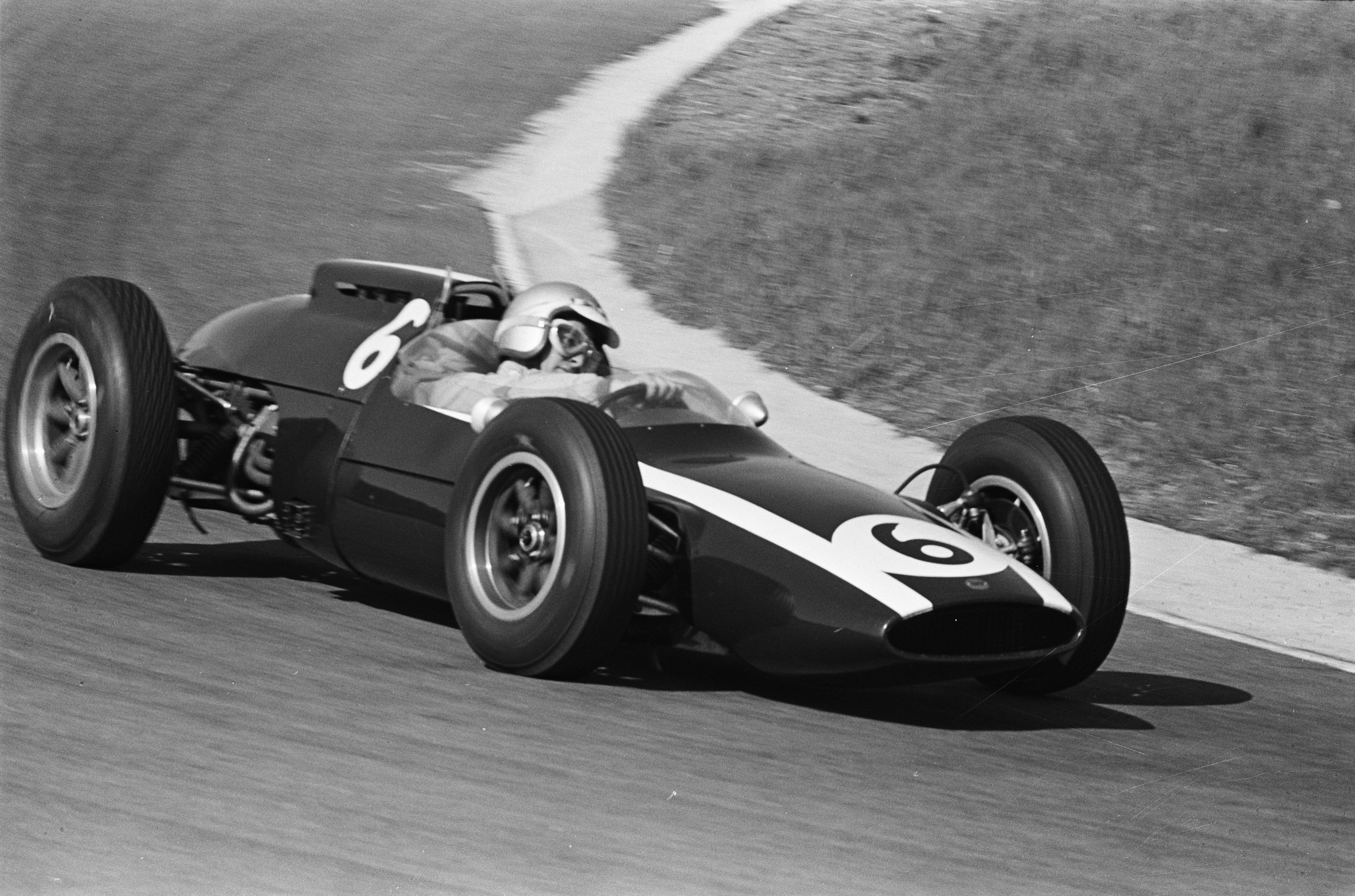
Cooper finished third in the International Cup for F1 Manufacturers with the Cooper T53, T55 & T60.

The 1962 Formula One season was the 16th season of FIA Formula One motor racing. It featured the 13th World Championship of Drivers, the 5th International Cup for F1 Manufacturers, and numerous non-championship Formula One races. The World Championship was contested over nine races between 20 May and 29 December 1962.

Graham Hill driving for BRM won his first Drivers' Championship when rival Jim Clark retired from the last race due to an oil leak in the 62nd lap while he was leading the race. BRM also won the Manufacturers' Championship for the first time, and it would be the only time.

Double World Champion Jack Brabham formed his own team and debuted the Brabham BT3 in the United States Grand Prix, becoming the first ever F1 driver to score championship points in a car bearing his own name.

Ricardo Rodríguez suffered a fatal crash during practice for his home race, the non-championship Mexican Grand Prix. He had been the youngest ever driver for Scuderia Ferrari, but also became the youngest ever F1 driver to die.

== Teams and drivers ==
The following teams and drivers competed in the 1962 FIA World Championship. All teams competed with tyres supplied by Dunlop.

Entrant	Constructor	Chassis	Engine	Driver	Rounds
(Italy) Scuderia Ferrari SpA SEFAC	Ferrari	156	Ferrari 178 1.5 V6	(United States) Phil Hill	1–3, 5–7
(Italy) Scuderia Ferrari SpA SEFAC	Ferrari	156	Ferrari 178 1.5 V6	(Italy) Giancarlo Baghetti	1, 3, 6–7
(Italy) Scuderia Ferrari SpA SEFAC	Ferrari	156	Ferrari 178 1.5 V6	(Mexico) Ricardo Rodríguez	1–3, 6–7
(Italy) Scuderia Ferrari SpA SEFAC	Ferrari	156	Ferrari 178 1.5 V6	(Italy) Lorenzo Bandini	2, 6–7
(Italy) Scuderia Ferrari SpA SEFAC	Ferrari	156	Ferrari 178 1.5 V6	(Belgium) Willy Mairesse	2–3, 7
(United Kingdom) Team Lotus	Lotus-Climax	25; 24	Climax FWMV 1.5 V8	(United Kingdom) Jim Clark	All
(United Kingdom) Team Lotus	Lotus-Climax	25; 24	Climax FWMV 1.5 V8	(United Kingdom) Trevor Taylor	All
(United Kingdom) Cooper Car Company	Cooper-Climax	T60; T55; T53	Climax FWMV 1.5 V8; Climax FPF 1.5 L4	(New Zealand) Bruce McLaren	All
(United Kingdom) Cooper Car Company	Cooper-Climax	T60; T55; T53	Climax FWMV 1.5 V8; Climax FPF 1.5 L4	(South Africa) Tony Maggs	All
(United Kingdom) Cooper Car Company	Cooper-Climax	T60; T55; T53	Climax FWMV 1.5 V8; Climax FPF 1.5 L4	(United States) Timmy Mayer	8
(United Kingdom) Brabham Racing Organisation	Lotus-Climax	24	Climax FWMV 1.5 V8	(Australia) Jack Brabham	1–5
(United Kingdom) Brabham Racing Organisation	Brabham-Climax	BT3	Climax FWMV 1.5 V8	(Australia) Jack Brabham	6, 8–9
(United Kingdom) UDT Laystall Racing Team	Lotus-Climax	24; 18/21	Climax FWMV 1.5 V8; Climax FPF 1.5 L4	(United Kingdom) Innes Ireland	1–5, 7–9
(United Kingdom) UDT Laystall Racing Team	Lotus-Climax	24; 18/21	Climax FWMV 1.5 V8; Climax FPF 1.5 L4	(United States) Masten Gregory	1, 5
(United Kingdom) UDT Laystall Racing Team	Lotus-BRM	24	BRM P56 1.5 V8	(United States) Masten Gregory	2–4, 7–8
(West Germany) Porsche System Engineering	Porsche	804; 718	Porsche 753 1.5 F8; Porsche 547/3 1.5 F4	(Sweden) Jo Bonnier	1–2, 4–8
(West Germany) Porsche System Engineering	Porsche	804; 718	Porsche 753 1.5 F8; Porsche 547/3 1.5 F4	(United States) Dan Gurney	1–2, 4–8
(West Germany) Porsche System Engineering	Porsche	804; 718	Porsche 753 1.5 F8; Porsche 547/3 1.5 F4	(United States) Phil Hill	8
(Netherlands) Ecurie Maarsbergen	Porsche	718; 787	Porsche 547/3 1.5 F4	(Netherlands) Carel Godin de Beaufort	All
(Netherlands) Ecurie Maarsbergen	Porsche	718; 787	Porsche 547/3 1.5 F4	(Netherlands) Ben Pon	1
(Netherlands) Ecurie Maarsbergen	Emeryson-Climax	61	Climax FPF 1.5 L4	(West Germany) Wolfgang Seidel	1
(United Kingdom) Owen Racing Organisation	BRM	P57; P48/57	BRM P56 1.5 V8	(United Kingdom) Graham Hill	All
(United Kingdom) Owen Racing Organisation	BRM	P57; P48/57	BRM P56 1.5 V8	(United States) Richie Ginther	All
(United Kingdom) Owen Racing Organisation	BRM	P57; P48/57	BRM P56 1.5 V8	(South Africa) Bruce Johnstone	9
(United Kingdom) Bowmaker-Yeoman Racing Team	Lola-Climax	Mk4	Climax FWMV 1.5 V8	(United Kingdom) John Surtees	All
(United Kingdom) Bowmaker-Yeoman Racing Team	Lola-Climax	Mk4	Climax FWMV 1.5 V8	(United Kingdom) Roy Salvadori	1–2, 4–9
(United Kingdom) Ecurie Galloise	Cooper-Climax	T53	Climax FPF 1.5 L4	(United Kingdom) Jackie Lewis	1, 4–6
(United Kingdom) Ecurie Galloise	BRM	P48/57	BRM P56 1.5 V8	(United Kingdom) Jackie Lewis	2
(United Kingdom) R.R.C. Walker Racing Team	Lotus-Climax	24	Climax FWMV 1.5 V8	(France) Maurice Trintignant	2–4, 6–8
(Switzerland) Ecurie Nationale Suisse (Switzerland) Ecurie Filipinetti	Lotus-Climax	21	Climax FPF 1.5 L4	(Switzerland) Jo Siffert	2–3, 6
(Switzerland) Ecurie Nationale Suisse (Switzerland) Ecurie Filipinetti	Lotus-BRM	24	BRM P56 1.5 V8	(Switzerland) Jo Siffert	4, 7
(Switzerland) Ecurie Nationale Suisse (Switzerland) Ecurie Filipinetti	Lotus-BRM	24	BRM P56 1.5 V8	(Switzerland) Heinz Schiller	6
(Switzerland) Ecurie Nationale Suisse (Switzerland) Ecurie Filipinetti	Porsche	718	Porsche 547/3 1.5 F4	(Switzerland) Heini Walter	6
(Italy) Scuderia SSS Republica di Venezia	Lotus-Climax	18/21; 24	Climax FPF 1.5 L4	(Italy) Nino Vaccarella	2, 7
(Italy) Scuderia SSS Republica di Venezia	Porsche	718	Porsche 547/3 1.5 F4	(Italy) Nino Vaccarella	6
(United Kingdom) Emeryson Cars	Lotus-Climax	18	Climax FPF 1.5 L4	(United Kingdom) John Campbell-Jones	3
(United Kingdom) Emeryson Cars	Emeryson-Climax	61	Climax FPF 1.5 L4	(United States) Tony Settember	5, 7
(Belgium) Equipe Nationale Belge	Lotus-Climax	18/21	Climax FPF 1.5 L4	(Belgium) Lucien Bianchi	3
(Belgium) Equipe Nationale Belge	ENB-Maserati	F1	Maserati Tipo 6 1.5 L4	(Belgium) Lucien Bianchi	6
(West Germany) Autosport Team Wolfgang Seidel	Lotus-BRM	24	BRM P56 1.5 V8	(United States) Dan Gurney	3
(West Germany) Autosport Team Wolfgang Seidel	Lotus-BRM	24	BRM P56 1.5 V8	(West Germany) Wolfgang Seidel	5–6
(West Germany) Autosport Team Wolfgang Seidel	Lotus-BRM	24	BRM P56 1.5 V8	(West Germany) Gunther Seiffert	6
(West Germany) Autosport Team Wolfgang Seidel	Lotus-BRM	24	BRM P56 1.5 V8	(New Zealand) Tony Shelly	7
(United Kingdom) Anglo-American Equipe	Cooper-Climax	T59	Climax FPF 1.5 L4	(United Kingdom) Ian Burgess	5–7
(United States) Ecurie Excelsior	Lotus-Climax	18	Climax FPF 1.5 L4	(United States) Jay Chamberlain	5–7
(United Kingdom) John Dalton	Lotus-Climax	18/21	Climax FPF 1.5 L4	(New Zealand) Tony Shelly	5–6
(United Kingdom) Gilby Engineering	Gilby-BRM	62	BRM P56 1.5 V8	(United Kingdom) Keith Greene	6–7
(France) Bernard Collomb	Cooper-Climax	T53	Climax FPF 1.5 L4	(France) Bernard Collomb	6
(Italy) Scuderia de Tomaso	De Tomaso	801	De Tomaso 1.5 F8	(Argentina) Nasif Estéfano	7
(Italy) Scuderia Settecolli	De Tomaso-OSCA	F1	OSCA 372 1.5 L4	(Italy) Roberto Lippi	7
(United Kingdom) Gerry Ashmore	Lotus-Climax	18/21	Climax FPF 1.5 L4	(United Kingdom) Gerry Ashmore	7
(Italy) Scuderia Jolly Club	Lotus-Climax	18	Climax FPF 1.5 L4	(Italy) Ernesto Prinoth	7
(United States) Dupont Team Zerex	Lotus-Climax	24	Climax FWMV 1.5 V8	(United States) Roger Penske	8
(United States) Hap Sharp	Cooper-Climax	T53	Climax FPF 1.5 L4	(United States) Hap Sharp	8
(United States) Jim Hall	Lotus-Climax	21	Climax FPF 1.5 L4	(United States) Jim Hall	8
(United States) John Mecom	Lotus-Climax	24	Climax FPF 1.5 L4	(United States) Rob Schroeder	8
(South Africa) Ernie Pieterse	Lotus-Climax	21	Climax FPF 1.5 L4	(South Africa) Ernie Pieterse	9
(Federation of Rhodesia and Nyasaland) John Love	Cooper-Climax	T55	Climax FPF 1.5 L4	(Federation of Rhodesia and Nyasaland) John Love	9
(South Africa) Neville Lederle	Lotus-Climax	21	Climax FPF 1.5 L4	(South Africa) Neville Lederle	9
(South Africa) Otelle Nucci	LDS-Alfa Romeo	Mk 1	Alfa Romeo Giulietta 1.5 L4	(South Africa) Doug Serrurier	9
(Federation of Rhodesia and Nyasaland) Mike Harris	Cooper-Alfa Romeo	T53	Alfa Romeo Giulietta 1.5 L4	(Federation of Rhodesia and Nyasaland) Mike Harris	9

=== Team and driver changes ===
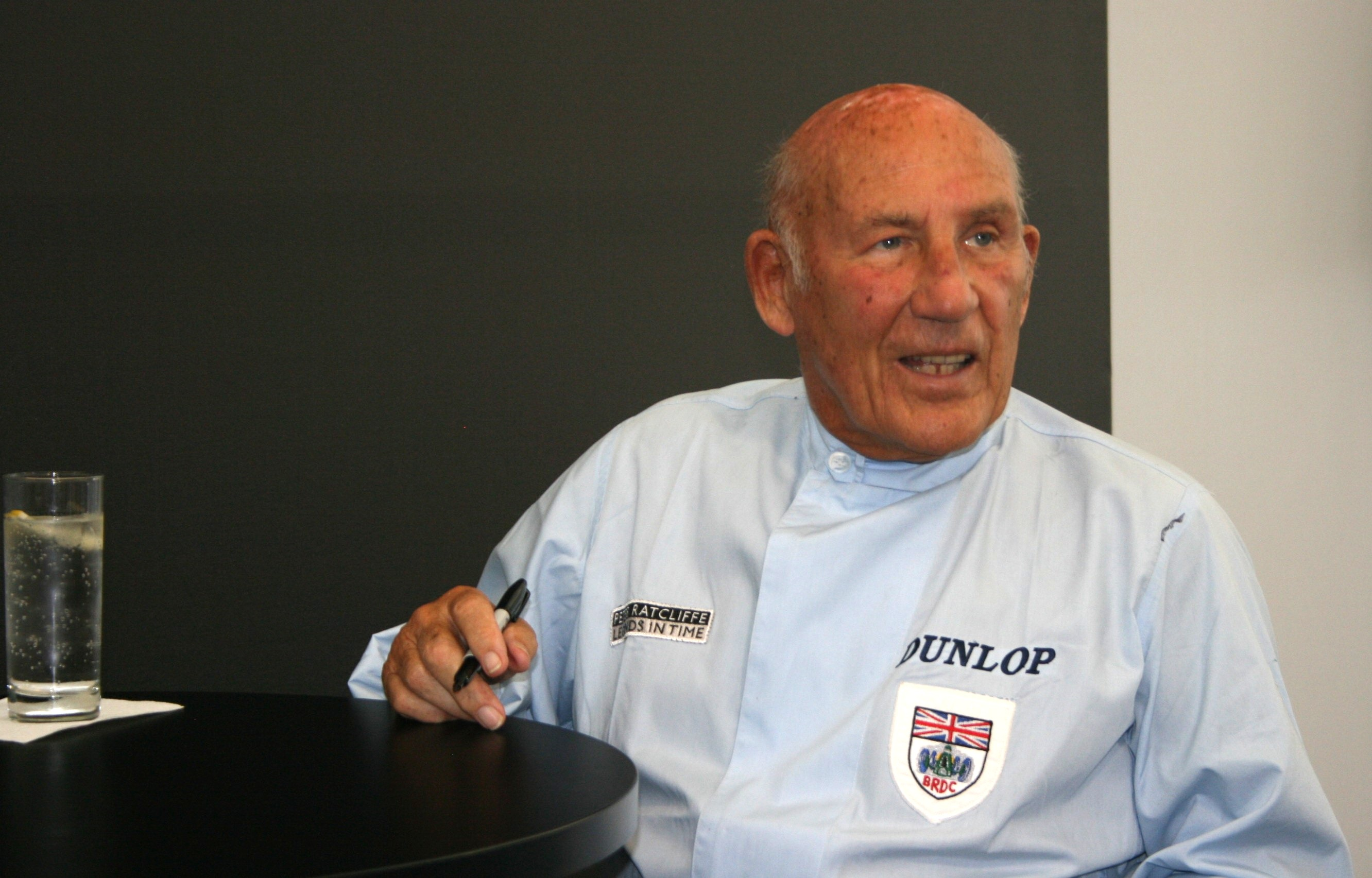
Stirling Moss (pictured in 2011) had signed with Ferrari for 1962, but a pre-season accident meant the end of his racing career.

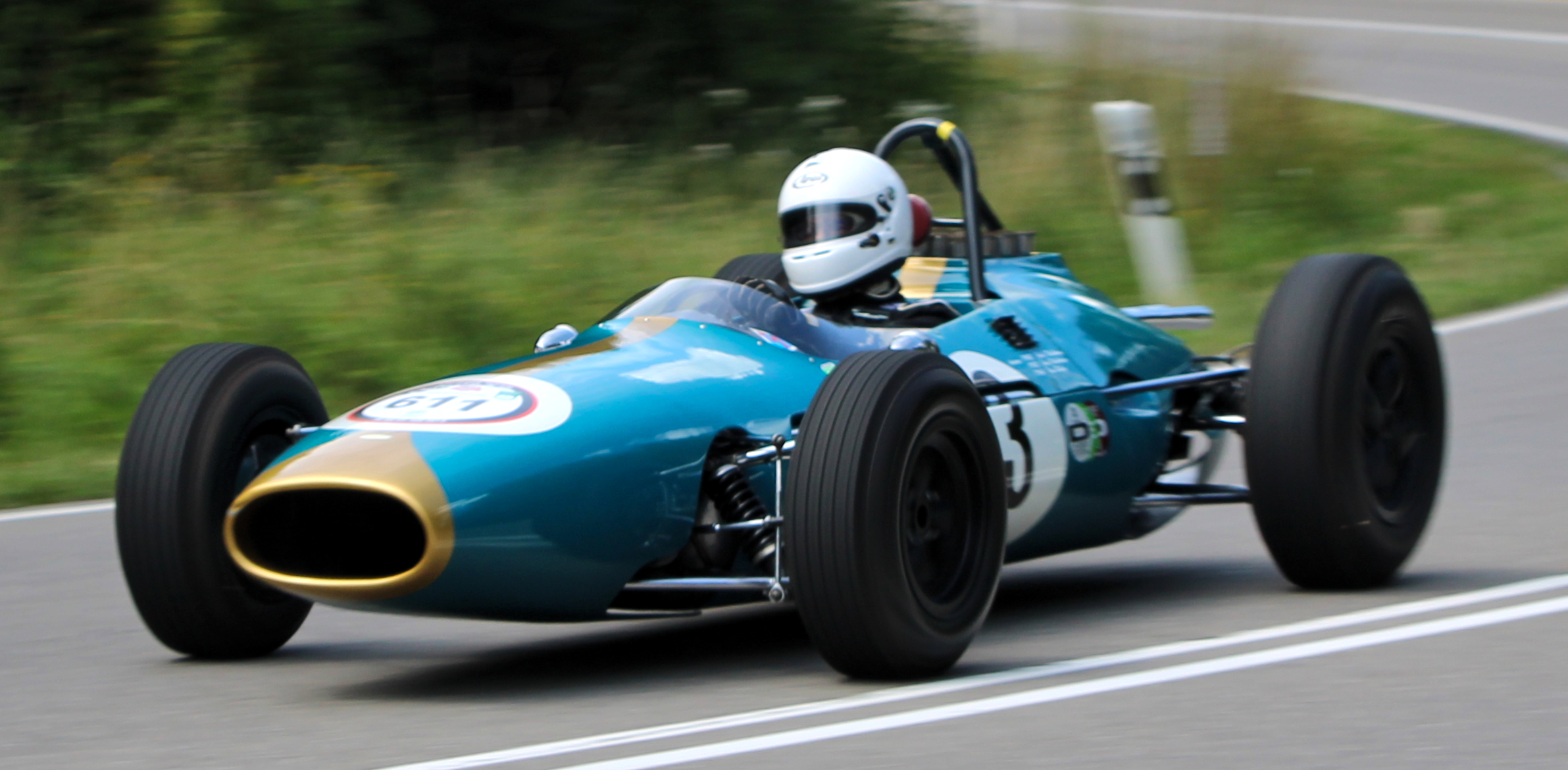
Double World Champion Jack Brabham set up his own team for 1962 and had his own chassis designed: the BT3 (pictured in 2019).

- Like in 1961, Ferrari entered most races with three cars. Stirling Moss was due to drive for them, but suffered an accident during the non-championship Glover Trophy. He went into a coma for a month and the left side of his body was paralysed for six months. Giancarlo Baghetti was granted the seat, having proven himself worthy by winning the 1961 French Grand Prix and multiple non-championship races in a privately run Ferrari.
- Richie Ginther moved from Ferrari to BRM, where Tony Brooks had retired. The team introduced their own V8 engine for this season, after they had had to rely on Climax engines the year before.
- Lotus hired Taylor after Innes Ireland was fired and went to the BRP team (renamed UDT Laystall Racing).
- Double World Champion Jack Brabham started his own team, Brabham, at first running a Lotus chassis but later debuting the BT3, with which he became the first F1 driver ever to score points in a car bearing his own name. Tony Maggs replaced him at Cooper.
- Bowmaker Racing (what would later become Reg Parnell Racing) entered the season with a Lola Mk4, the first ever F1 chassis by Lola Cars.

==== Mid-season changes ====
- Lorenzo Bandini and Willy Mairesse joined Scuderia Ferrari on a part-time basis, expanding the squad to five cars for the Italian Grand Prix.
- After a brief appearance in 1956, Emeryson was back on the grid as a works team. They ran a Lotus chassis once before debuting a self-designed car in the British Grand Prix.
- The ENB team debuted a self-made chassis in the German Grand Prix, powered by a Maserati engine.

== Calendar ==
Round	Grand Prix	Circuit	Date
1	Dutch Grand Prix	(Netherlands) Circuit Zandvoort, Zandvoort	20 May
2	Monaco Grand Prix	Circuit de Monaco, Monte Carlo	3 June
3	Belgian Grand Prix	(Belgium) Circuit de Spa-Francorchamps, Stavelot	17 June
4	French Grand Prix	(France) Rouen-Les-Essarts, Orival	8 July
5	British Grand Prix	(United Kingdom) Aintree Motor Racing Circuit, Merseyside	21 July
6	German Grand Prix	(West Germany) Nürburgring, Nürburg	5 August
7	Italian Grand Prix	(Italy) Autodromo Nazionale di Monza, Monza	16 September
8	United States Grand Prix	(United States) Watkins Glen International, New York	7 October
9	South African Grand Prix	(South Africa) Prince George Circuit, East London	29 December

=== Calendar changes ===
- The Monaco Grand Prix was moved back three weeks, making the Dutch Grand Prix the season opener.
- The French Grand Prix was moved from Reims-Gueux to Rouen-Les-Essarts for a year, as it was the tradition to do every five years (after 1952 and 1957).
- The South African Grand Prix made its debut on the championship calendar. The race was held at the Prince George Circuit as the season finale on 29 December.

== Championship report ==
=== Rounds 1 to 3 ===
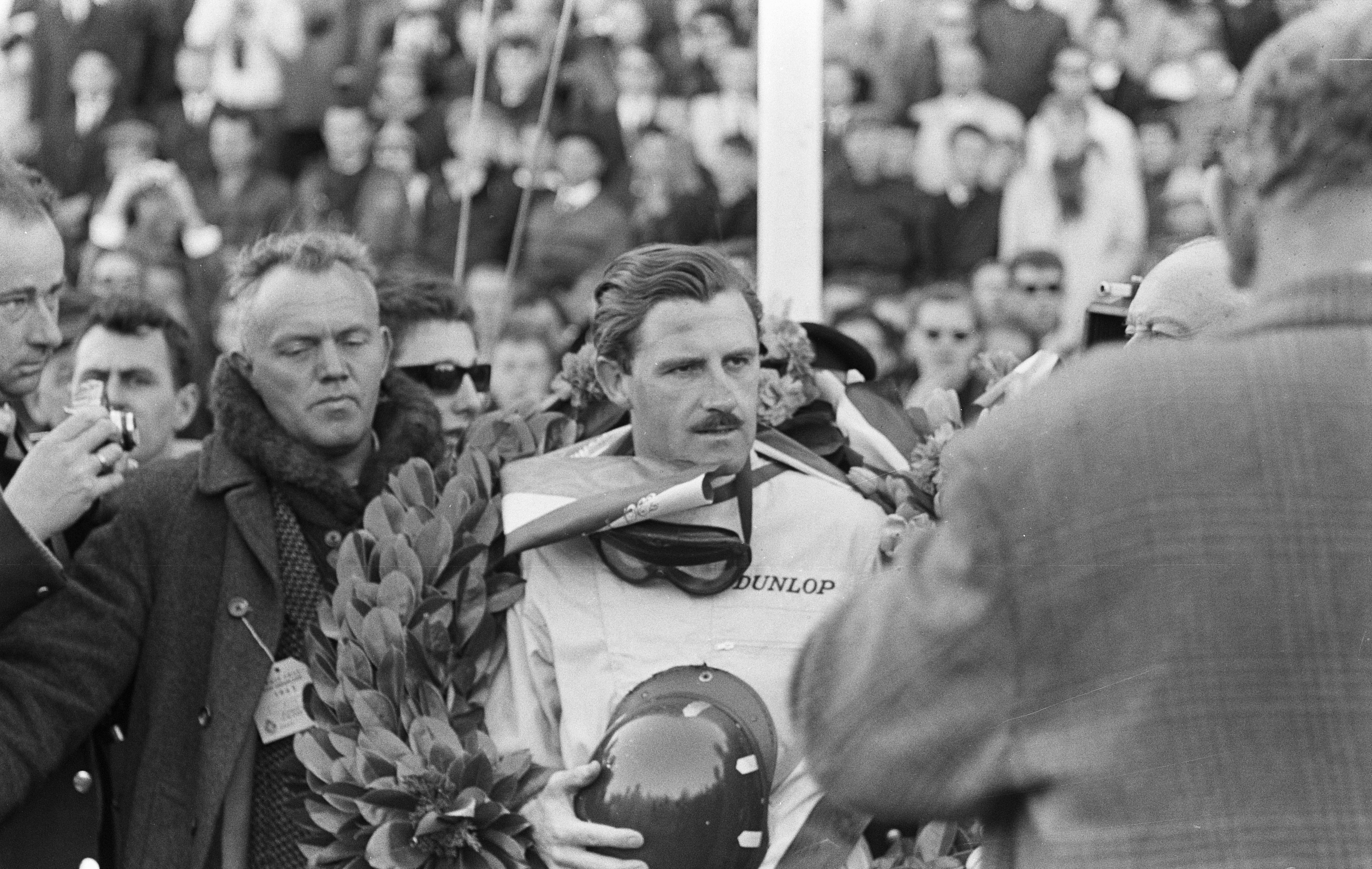
Graham Hill (BRM) won the season opener, the Dutch Grand Prix.

The Dutch Grand Prix hosted the season opener for the first time and was granted the honorary designation of European Grand Prix for this year. Lotus turned up with a revolutionary new chassis, the Lotus 25 being the first car built around an aluminium monocoque instead of a space frame. However, it was John Surtees who took pole position in the privately run Lola, ahead of Graham Hill for BRM. Lotus's Jim Clark qualified third, but this meant he had the inside line to the first corner and he managed to take the lead. Dan Gurney in the Porsche had a wonderful start from eighth to take third behind Hill and ahead of Surtees. The top three were steady in the opening phase, but then, both Clark and Gurney ran into technical troubles. Around the same time, the front wishbone broke on Surtees's Lola and he had a heavy crash but escaped unhurt. Graham Hill led away and scored the victory. Bruce McLaren (Cooper) was running second before he retired with a broken gearbox. Reigning champion Phil Hill (Ferrari) was running third at the time, inheriting second but later being overtaken by Trevor Taylor (Lotus).

Jim Clark scored his first career pole in the Monaco Grand Prix, ahead of Graham Hill and Bruce McLaren. But due to a confusing start procedure, it was Willy Mairesse in the Ferrari who went by, touching wheels with Clark and Hill in the process and locking up his wheels into the first corner. A chain reaction led to an accident with six drivers, three of whom retired on the spot. Mairesse took the lead but spun his car in the second hairpin, making the order at the end of the first lap: McLaren, Graham Hill, Phil Hill. McLaren was relegated back to second by lap 7, and then third by Clark, who was recovering from a bad start, was setting multiple fastest laps and started challenging Hill for the lead. On lap 55, however, his clutch gave out and he had to retire. But Hill was not yet out of the woods, with his BRM engine starting to smoke and McLaren, back in second, getting ever closer. On lap 93, Hill's engine gave up with a bang, although he still scored a point, as he was classified in sixth. McLaren was challenged by Phil Hill but held on to score his first win in two years. Lorenzo Bandini finished third in his first race for Ferrari.

The Belgian Grand Prix saw Graham Hill qualify on pole, ahead of McLaren, Taylor and home hero Mairesse. In the first phase of the race, those four were fighting over the lead in close combat and their relative positions changed all the while. Clark had started in twelfth, but joined the leading group. On lap 11, Clark set the fastest lap and took the lead, with teammate Taylor holding back their rivals. Clark held on to take the win, but getting up to the final corner of lap 26, Taylor crashed with Mairesse, the Lotus cutting down a telegraph pole and the Ferrari landing upside down on fire. Both drivers were flung out and suffered minor injuries. Graham Hill finished second, Phil Hill third. Ricardo Rodríguez came home in fourth, becoming the youngest F1 driver ever to score points. This record stood until Jenson Button broke it in the 2000 Brazilian Grand Prix.

In the Drivers' Championship, Graham Hill (BRM) was leading with 16 points, ahead of 1961 champion Phil Hill (Ferrari) with 14 and Jim Clark (Lotus) with 9. In the Manufacturers' Championship, BRM went ahead with 16 points, ahead of Lotus (15) and Ferrari (14).

=== Rounds 4 to 6 ===
The French Grand Prix saw Jim Clark qualify on pole position in his Lotus, ahead of championship leader Graham Hill for BRM and Bruce McLaren for Cooper. Although Ferrari had withdrawn from the event due to strike actions, the first three rows were occupied by seven different teams and five different constructors. Fifth-starting John Surtees was in second after the first lap and challenged Hill for the lead, but had to pit when his engine had trouble picking up fuel. Jackie Lewis was lapped by Hill but then suddenly lost his brakes and rear-ended the leader. Clark took the lead, but was caught by Hill within three laps, confirming to the Lotus team that their car was not running well, and they decided to retire from the race. Further drama ensued when Hill's BRM engine had jammed with ten laps to go, paving the way for Dan Gurney taking his first and Porsche's only win. South African Tony Maggs was second for Cooper, scoring his first podium, and Richie Ginther third for BRM.

During the British Grand Prix, Clark scored his third pole position of the year, this time ahead of Surtees and Ireland. The latter, however, could not get his Lotus to fire up and was passed at by everyone at the start. McLaren took over third place. The top three remained unchanged throughout the race, with Clark taking an unchallenged win and even getting close to lapping championship leader Hill, who came home in fourth.

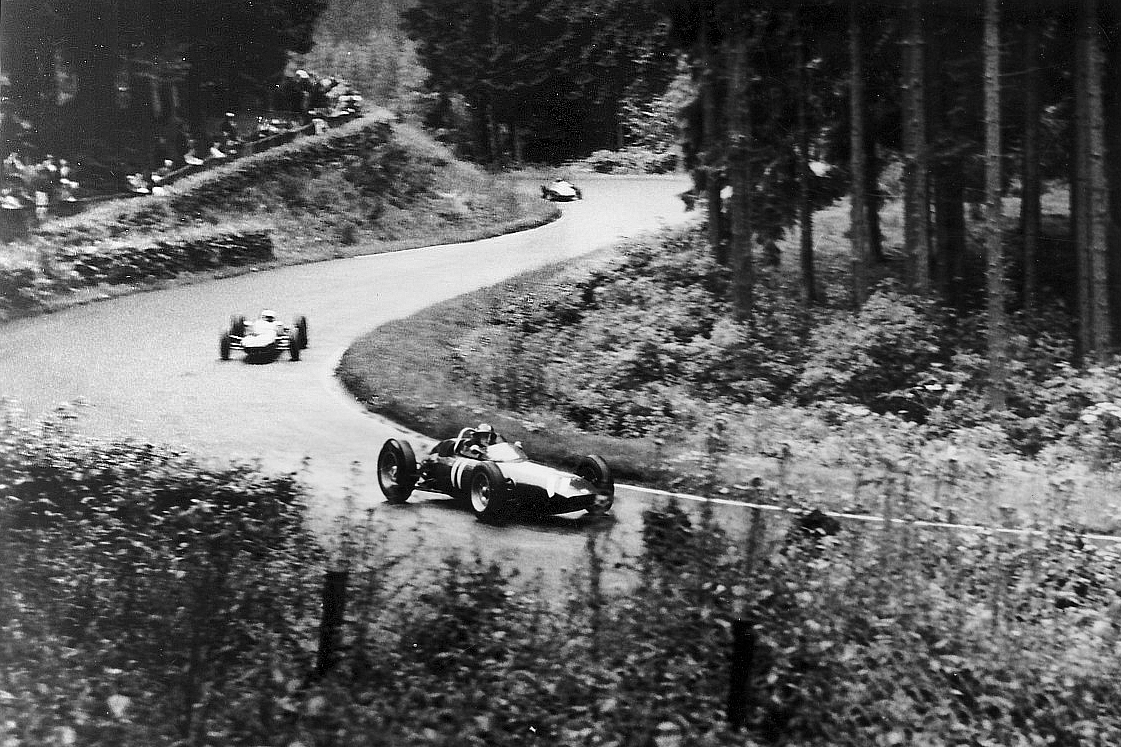
In the German Grand Prix, the top three (Hill, Surtees, Gurney) finished within five seconds of each other.

The German Grand Prix saw the debut of Brabham's first F1 chassis, designed by Ron Tauranac. Scuderia Ferrari, having recovered from strikes in Italy, brought an upgraded chassis and gave it to Lorenzo Bandini to try it out. During practice, Carel Godin de Beaufort was running his Porsche with a large camera mounted to the rear by the German television crew. The device fell off, however, and championship leader Hill was the unlucky victim, unable to avoid it, breaking his oil lines and quickly spinning off the track. Tony Maggs then slid on Hill's oil and had a similar accident, but both drivers were unhurt. Gurney started on pole, ahead of Hill and Clark, but the race was delayed for over an hour, after a sudden downpour made the track incredibly slippery. When the race got underway, Clark stalled his engine and fell back, but he passed 17 cars on the first lap. The leading pair went side-by-side as they started the third lap and it was Hill who came out on top. Surtees had inherited third place from Clark and this top three got away from the rest. Surtees got second place when Gurney's battery came loose and the American had to secure by hand. At half-distance, Clark had recovered to fourth place, mastering the wet conditions and gaining at least five seconds per lap on the leading trio. After almost losing the car twice at high speed, however, the Scot settled down. Surtees tried to push Hill into making a mistake but the Brit held on, taking the win, with Surtees and Gurney finishing within the next five seconds.

In the Drivers' Championship, Graham Hill (BRM) was still holding onto the lead with 28 points, ahead of Jim Clark (Lotus) with 21 and John Surtees (Lola) with 19. In the Manufacturers' Championship, BRM were leading with 31, ahead of Lotus (27) and Cooper (23).

=== Rounds 7 to 9 ===
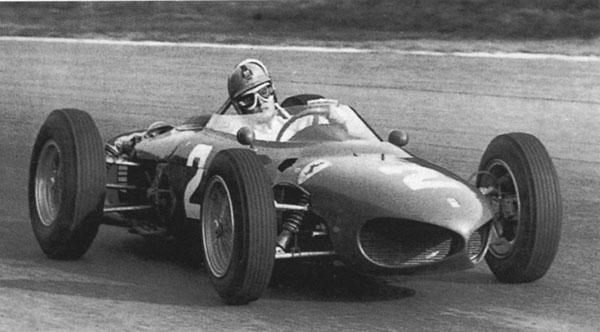
Ferrari entered five cars in their home race, two of which, including Giancarlo Baghetti (pictured), finished in the points.

The Italian Grand Prix was run on the road circuit of Monza, abandoning the fearsome banked oval. Jim Clark, second in the championship, qualified on pole position, ahead of championship leader Graham Hill and his teammate Richie Ginther. Hill took the lead at the start and led a group eight cars. Ferrari had brought five cars to their home race but they were all down in the second group. Clark pitted with transmission problems, while Hill managed to create some space between him and the rest. BRM scored a comfortable 1–2, while close fighting and a light rain shower provided exciting battles, from which Bruce McLaren came up to complete the podium.

F1 moved overseas for the United States Grand Prix at Watkins Glen. In repeat of this year's French GP and last year's US GP, Ferrari withdrew from this race and the next because of ongoing strikes in Italy. Clark qualified on pole, ahead of Ginther and Hill, and the Lotus was fastest at the start. Hill went into second, trying everything to stay with his rival. This paid off on lap 12, when Clark was held up by a backmarker and Hill swooped by. On lap 19, however, Clark snatched the lead back and held on to take the win, ten seconds ahead of Hill. The rest of the field, all at least a lap down, were led by third-placed McLaren.

Coming to the season finale, the South African Grand Prix, Clark had a nine-point deficit to Hill. If Clark would manage to win the race, then Hill could finish second at best, which meant that his result would not count - only the five best results of the season counted towards the championship. This would result in a tie on points, and Clark would win the title on countback - he would have four wins against Hill's three.

Clark started off well, scoring his sixth pole position of the season, with Hill starting alongside him. He held the lead at the start and then pulled away by a second per lap. He had an immense lead of half a minute when, suddenly, blue smoke started pouring from his engine. After stopping in the pits, it was found that a bolt was missing from the crankcase, which had allowed oil to leak out. The smoke was caused by the oil leaking on the exhaust. The Lotus mechanics did not have a fix, which meant Clark had to retire and give up the championship. Hill could cruise to the finish but still won the race almost 50 seconds ahead of McLaren and home hero Tony Maggs.

The Drivers' Championship was settled with Graham Hill (BRM) on 42 points, winning his first title, ahead of Jim Clark (Lotus) on 30 and Bruce McLaren (Cooper) on 27. The Manufacturers' Championship was won by BRM with 42 points, ahead of Lotus (36) and Cooper (29).

== Results and standings ==
=== Grands Prix ===
Round	Grand Prix	Pole position	Fastest lap	Winning driver	Winning constructor	Tyre	Report
1	(Netherlands) Dutch Grand Prix	(United Kingdom) John Surtees	(New Zealand) Bruce McLaren	(United Kingdom) Graham Hill	(United Kingdom) BRM	D	Report
2	Monaco Grand Prix	(United Kingdom) Jim Clark	(United Kingdom) Jim Clark	(New Zealand) Bruce McLaren	(United Kingdom) Cooper-Climax	D	Report
3	(Belgium) Belgian Grand Prix	(United Kingdom) Graham Hill	(United Kingdom) Jim Clark	(United Kingdom) Jim Clark	(United Kingdom) Lotus-Climax	D	Report
4	(France) French Grand Prix	(United Kingdom) Jim Clark	(United Kingdom) Graham Hill	(United States) Dan Gurney	(West Germany) Porsche	D	Report
5	(United Kingdom) British Grand Prix	(United Kingdom) Jim Clark	(United Kingdom) Jim Clark	(United Kingdom) Jim Clark	(United Kingdom) Lotus-Climax	D	Report
6	(West Germany) German Grand Prix	(United States) Dan Gurney	(United Kingdom) Graham Hill	(United Kingdom) Graham Hill	(United Kingdom) BRM	D	Report
7	(Italy) Italian Grand Prix	(United Kingdom) Jim Clark	(United Kingdom) Graham Hill	(United Kingdom) Graham Hill	(United Kingdom) BRM	D	Report
8	United States Grand Prix	(United Kingdom) Jim Clark	(United Kingdom) Jim Clark	(United Kingdom) Jim Clark	(United Kingdom) Lotus-Climax	D	Report
9	(South Africa) South African Grand Prix	(United Kingdom) Jim Clark	(United Kingdom) Jim Clark	(United Kingdom) Graham Hill	(United Kingdom) BRM	D	Report

=== Scoring system ===
Points were awarded to the top six classified finishers. Only the best five results counted towards the championship.

The International Cup for F1 Manufacturers only counted the points of the highest-finishing driver for each race. Additionally, like the Drivers' Championship, only the best five results counted towards the cup.

Numbers without parentheses are championship points; numbers in parentheses are total points scored. Points were awarded in the following system:

Position	1st	2nd	3rd	4th	5th	6th
Race	9	6	4	3	2	1

=== World Drivers' Championship standings ===
Pos.	Driver	NED (Netherlands)	MON (Monaco)	BEL (Belgium)	FRA (France)	GBR (United Kingdom)	GER (West Germany)	ITA (Italy)	USA (United States)	RSA (South Africa)	Pts.
1	(United Kingdom) Graham Hill	1	(6)	2^{P}	9^{F}	(4)	1^{F}	1^{F}	(2)	1	42 (52)
2	(United Kingdom) Jim Clark	9	Ret^{P}^{F}	1^{F}	Ret^{P}	1^{P}^{F}	4	Ret^{P}	1^{P}^{F}	Ret^{P}^{F}	30
3	(New Zealand) Bruce McLaren	Ret^{F}	1	Ret	(4)	3	(5)	3	3	2	27 (32)
4	(United Kingdom) John Surtees	Ret^{P}	4	5	5	2	2	Ret	Ret	Ret	19
5	(United States) Dan Gurney	Ret	Ret	DNS	1	9	3^{P}	13	5		15
6	(United States) Phil Hill	3	2	3		Ret	Ret	11	DNS		14
7	(South Africa) Tony Maggs	5	Ret	Ret	2	6	9	7	7	3	13
8	(United States) Richie Ginther	Ret	Ret	Ret	3	13	8	2	Ret	7	10
9	(Australia) Jack Brabham	Ret	8	6	Ret	5	Ret		4	4	9
10	(United Kingdom) Trevor Taylor	2	Ret	Ret	8	8	Ret	Ret	12	Ret	6
11	(Italy) Giancarlo Baghetti	4		Ret			10	5			5
12	(Italy) Lorenzo Bandini		3				Ret	8			4
13	(Mexico) Ricardo Rodríguez	Ret	DNS	4			6	14			4
14	(Belgium) Willy Mairesse		7	Ret				4			3
15	(Sweden) Jo Bonnier	7	5		10	Ret	7	6	13		3
16	(United Kingdom) Innes Ireland	Ret	Ret	Ret	Ret	16		Ret	8	5	2
17	(Netherlands) Carel Godin de Beaufort	6	DNQ	7	6	14	13	10	Ret	11	2
18	(United States) Masten Gregory	Ret	DNQ	Ret	Ret	7		12	6		1
19	(South Africa) Neville Lederle									6	1
—	(France) Maurice Trintignant		Ret	8	7		Ret	Ret	Ret		0
—	(United Kingdom) Jackie Lewis	8	DNQ		Ret	10	Ret				0
—	(Federation of Rhodesia and Nyasaland) John Love									8	0
—	(Italy) Nino Vaccarella		DNQ				15	9			0
—	(Belgium) Lucien Bianchi			9			16				0
—	(United States) Roger Penske								9		0
—	(South Africa) Bruce Johnstone									9	0
—	(Switzerland) Jo Siffert		DNQ	10	Ret		12	DNQ			0
—	(United States) Rob Schroeder								10		0
—	(South Africa) Ernie Pieterse									10	0
—	(United Kingdom) Ian Burgess					12	11	DNQ			0
—	(United States) Tony Settember					11		Ret			0
—	(United Kingdom) John Campbell-Jones			11							0
—	(United States) Hap Sharp								11		0
—	(Switzerland) Heini Walter						14				0
—	(United States) Jay Chamberlain					15	DNQ	DNQ			0
—	(West Germany) Wolfgang Seidel	NC				Ret	DNQ				0
—	(United Kingdom) Roy Salvadori	Ret	Ret		Ret	Ret	Ret	Ret	DNS	Ret	0
—	(New Zealand) Tony Shelly					Ret	DNQ	DNQ			0
—	(United Kingdom) Keith Greene					DNS	Ret	DNQ			0
—	(Netherlands) Ben Pon	Ret									0
—	(Switzerland) Heinz Schiller						Ret				0
—	(France) Bernard Collomb						Ret				0
—	(United States) Timmy Mayer								Ret		0
—	(South Africa) Doug Serrurier									Ret	0
—	(Federation of Rhodesia and Nyasaland) Mike Harris									Ret	0
—	(West Germany) Günther Seiffert						DNQ				0
—	(United Kingdom) Gerry Ashmore							DNQ			0
—	(Italy) Ernesto Prinoth							DNQ			0
—	(Italy) Roberto Lippi							DNQ			0
—	(Argentina) Nasif Estéfano							DNQ			0
—	(United States) Jim Hall								DNS		0
Pos.	Driver	NED (Netherlands)	MON (Monaco)	BEL (Belgium)	FRA (France)	GBR (United Kingdom)	GER (West Germany)	ITA (Italy)	USA (United States)	RSA (South Africa)	Pts.

Key
Colour	Result
Gold	Winner
Silver	Second place
Bronze	Third place
Green	Other points position
Blue	Other classified position
Blue	Not classified, finished (NC)
Purple	Not classified, retired (Ret)
Red	Did not qualify (DNQ)
Black	Disqualified (DSQ)
White	Did not start (DNS)
White	Race cancelled (C)
Blank	Did not practice (DNP)
Blank	Excluded (EX)
Blank	Did not arrive (DNA)
Blank	Withdrawn (WD)
Blank	Did not enter (empty cell)
Annotation	Meaning
P	Pole position
F	Fastest lap

- Only the best 5 results counted towards the championship. Numbers without parentheses are championship points; numbers in parentheses are total points scored.
- Italics indicate fastest lap
- **Bold** indicates pole position

=== International Cup for F1 Manufacturers standings ===
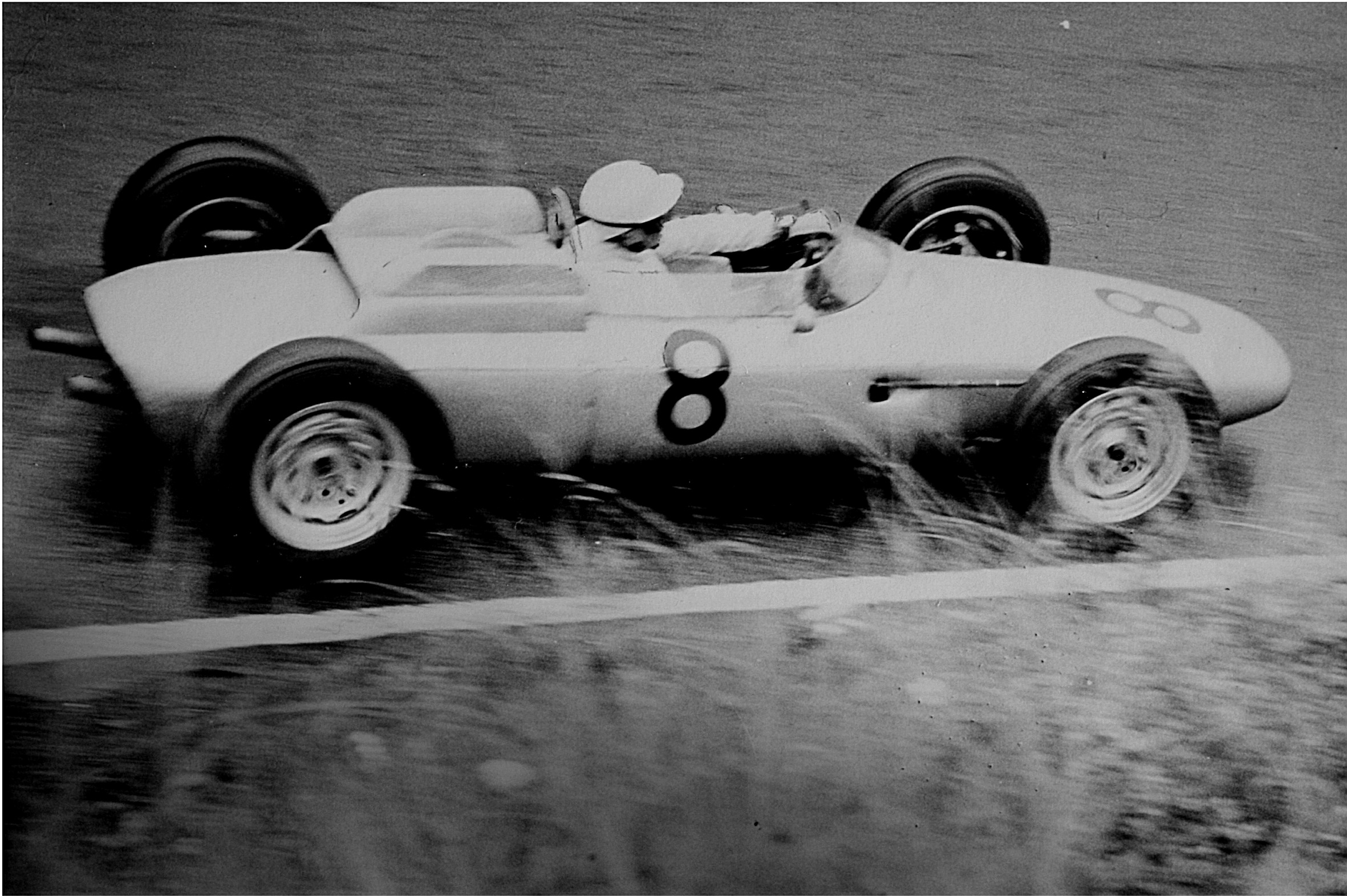
Porsche placed fifth in the 1962 International Cup for F1 Manufacturers

Pos.	Manufacturer	NED (Netherlands)	MON (Monaco)	BEL (Belgium)	FRA (France)	GBR (United Kingdom)	GER (West Germany)	ITA (Italy)	USA (United States)	RSA (South Africa)	Pts. (Note: Only the best 5 results counted towards the championship. Numbers without parentheses are championship points; numbers in parentheses are total points scored.)
1	(United Kingdom) BRM	**1**	(6)	**2**	(3)	(4)	**1**	**1**	(2)	**1**	42 (56)
2	(United Kingdom) Lotus-Climax	**2**	8	**1**	7	**1**	**4**	9	**1**	(5)	36 (38)
3	(United Kingdom) Cooper-Climax	(5)	**1**	Ret	**2**	**3**	(5)	**3**	(3)	**2**	29 (37)
4	(United Kingdom) Lola-Climax	Ret	**4**	**5**	**5**	**2**	**2**	Ret	Ret	Ret	19
5	(West Germany) Porsche	**6**	**5**	7	**1**	9	**3**	(6)	**5**	11	18 (19)
6	(Italy) Ferrari	**3**	**2**	**3**	WD	Ret	**6**	**4**	WD		18
7	(United Kingdom) Brabham-Climax						Ret		**4**	**4**	6
8	(United Kingdom) Lotus-BRM		DNQ	Ret	Ret	Ret	Ret	12	**6**		1
—	(United Kingdom) Emeryson-Climax	NC				11		Ret		WD	0
—	(Belgium) ENB-Maserati						16				0
—	(United Kingdom) Gilby-BRM					WD	Ret	DNQ			0
—	(South Africa) LDS-Alfa Romeo									Ret	0
—	(United Kingdom) Cooper-Alfa Romeo									Ret	0
—	(Italy) De Tomaso							DNQ			0
—	(Italy) De Tomaso-OSCA							DNQ			0
Pos.	Manufacturer	NED (Netherlands)	MON (Monaco)	BEL (Belgium)	FRA (France)	GBR (United Kingdom)	GER (West Germany)	ITA (Italy)	USA (United States)	RSA (South Africa)	Pts.

- Only the best five results counted towards the championship. Numbers without parentheses are championship points; numbers in parentheses are total points scored.
- **Bold** results counted to championship totals.

== Non-championship races ==
The following Formula One races which did not count towards the World Championship of Drivers or the International Cup for F1 Manufacturers, were also held in 1962.

Race name	Circuit	Date	Winning driver	Constructor	Report
(South Africa) V Cape Grand Prix	Killarney	2 January	(United Kingdom) Trevor Taylor	(United Kingdom) Lotus-Climax	Report
(Belgium) IV Brussels Grand Prix	Heysel	1 April	(Belgium) Willy Mairesse	(Italy) Ferrari	Report
(United Kingdom) III Lombank Trophy	Snetterton	14 April	(United Kingdom) Jim Clark	(United Kingdom) Lotus-Climax	Report
(United Kingdom) XIV Lavant Cup	Goodwood	23 April	(New Zealand) Bruce McLaren	(United Kingdom) Cooper-Climax	Report
(United Kingdom) X Glover Trophy	Goodwood	23 April	(United Kingdom) Graham Hill	(United Kingdom) BRM	Report
(France) XXII Pau Grand Prix	Pau	23 April	(France) Maurice Trintignant	(United Kingdom) Lotus-Climax	Report
(United Kingdom) VII Aintree 200	Aintree	28 April	(United Kingdom) Jim Clark	(United Kingdom) Lotus-Climax	Report
(United Kingdom) XV BRDC International Trophy	Silverstone	12 May	(United Kingdom) Graham Hill	(United Kingdom) BRM	Report
(Italy) XX Naples Grand Prix	Posillipo	20 May	(Belgium) Willy Mairesse	(Italy) Ferrari	Report
(United Kingdom) I International 2000 Guineas	Mallory Park	11 June	(United Kingdom) John Surtees	(United Kingdom) Lola-Climax	Report
(United Kingdom) XIII Crystal Palace Trophy	Crystal Palace	11 June	(United Kingdom) Innes Ireland	(United Kingdom) Lotus-BRM	Report
(France) III Grand Prix de Reims	Reims	1 July	(New Zealand) Bruce McLaren	(United Kingdom) Cooper-Climax	Report
(West Germany) XII Solitude Grand Prix	Solitudering	15 July	(United States) Dan Gurney	(West Germany) Porsche	Report
(Sweden) VIII Kanonloppet	Karlskoga	12 August	(United States) Masten Gregory	(United Kingdom) Lotus-BRM	Report
(Italy) I Mediterranean Grand Prix	Enna-Pergusa	19 August	(Italy) Lorenzo Bandini	(Italy) Ferrari	Report
(Denmark) III Danish Grand Prix	Roskilde Ring	25–26 August	(Australia) Jack Brabham	(United Kingdom) Lotus-Climax	Report
(United Kingdom) IX Gold Cup	Oulton Park	1 September	(United Kingdom) Jim Clark	(United Kingdom) Lotus-Climax	Report
(Mexico) I Mexican Grand Prix	Magdalena Mixhuca	4 November	(United Kingdom) Jim Clark (United Kingdom) Trevor Taylor	(United Kingdom) Lotus-Climax	Report
(South Africa) V Rand Grand Prix	Kyalami	15 December	(United Kingdom) Jim Clark	(United Kingdom) Lotus-Climax	Report
(South Africa) II Natal Grand Prix	Westmead	22 December	(United Kingdom) Trevor Taylor	(United Kingdom) Lotus-Climax	Report
