= 1962 Reims Grand Prix =

Coordinates: 49°15′14.67″N 3°55′50.02″E

- Non-championship race in the 1962 Formula One season
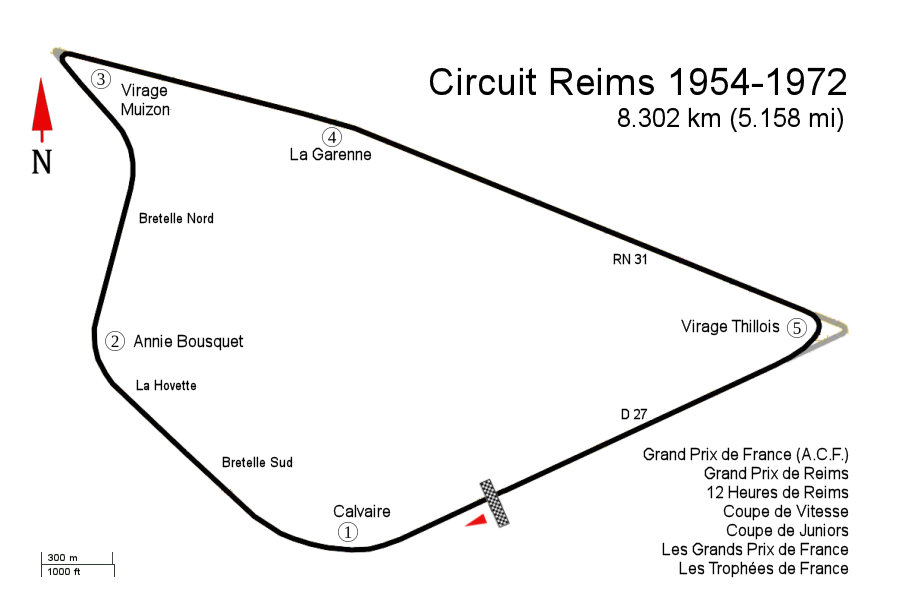

Race details
- Date: July 1, 1962
- Official name: III Grand Prix de Reims
- Location: Reims-Gueux, Reims
- Course: Permanent racing facility
- Course length: 8.3 km (5.158 miles)
- Distance: 50 laps, 415 km (257.9 miles)

Pole position
Driver	(United Kingdom) Jim Clark	Lotus-Climax
- Time: 2:22.9

Fastest lap
Driver	(United Kingdom) Graham Hill	BRM
- Time: 2:24.0

Podium
First	(New Zealand) Bruce McLaren	Cooper-Climax
Second	(United Kingdom) Graham Hill	BRM
Third	(United Kingdom) Innes Ireland	Lotus-Climax

The 3rd Reims Grand Prix was a Formula One motor race, held on July 1, 1962, at the Reims-Gueux circuit, near Reims in France. The race was run over 50 laps of the 8.302 km circuit and was won by New Zealand driver Bruce McLaren in a Cooper T60.

Reims-Gueux hosted the French Grand Prix under Grand Prix regulations in 1932, 1938 and 1939 due to the popularity of the Grand Prix de la Marne, a Grand Prix racing series dating back to 1925. Post war changes in political and financial structures moved the 1962 Grand Prix de France to the Rouen-Les-Essarts circuit. Reims secured a separate non-championship Formula One event instead. Most of the Formula One teams entered the competition except for Ferrari and Porsche.

== Results ==
Pos	No.	Driver	Entrant	Constructor /Car	Time/Retired	Grid
1	6	(New Zealand) Bruce McLaren	Cooper Car Company	Cooper-Climax T60	2.02:30.2	4
2	2	(United Kingdom) Graham Hill	Owen Racing Organisation	BRM P57-8	+ 8.0 s	2
3	30	(United Kingdom) Innes Ireland	UDT-Laystall Racing Team	Lotus-Climax 24	+ 1:36.3 s	7
4	22	(Australia) Jack Brabham	Brabham Racing Organisation	Lotus-Climax 24	+ 2:03.6 s	5
5	24	(France) Maurice Trintignant	Rob Walker Racing Team	Lotus-Climax 24	49 laps	8
6	28	(United Kingdom) Roy Salvadori	Bowmaker Racing Team	Lola-Climax Mk4	49 laps	10
7	46	(Netherlands) Carel Godin de Beaufort	Ecurie Maarsbergen	Porsche 718	48 laps	11
8	36	(Sweden) Jo Bonnier	Scuderia Serenissima	Porsche 718	48 laps	14
9	40	(Switzerland) Jo Siffert	Ecurie Filipinetti	Lotus-Climax 21	46 laps	15
10	34	(United Kingdom) Jack Lewis	Ecurie Galloise	Cooper-Climax	46 laps	18
11	44	(United Kingdom) Ian Burgess	Anglo-American Equipe	Cooper-Climax Special (Aiden Cooper)	45 laps	17
Ret	14	(United Kingdom) Peter Arundell (United Kingdom) Jim Clark	Team Lotus	Lotus-BRM 24	Out of fuel	13
Ret	4	(United States) Richie Ginther	Owen Racing Organisation	BRM P57-8	Gearbox	9
Ret	26	(United Kingdom) John Surtees	Bowmaker Racing Team	Lola-Climax Mk4	Valve spring	3
Ret	38	(Italy) Carlo Abate	Scuderia Serenissima	Lotus-Climax 18/21	Accident	20
Ret	8	(South Africa) Tony Maggs	Cooper Car Company	Cooper-Climax T55	Oil pressure	16
Ret	10	(United Kingdom) Jim Clark	Team Lotus	Lotus-Climax 25	Header tank	1
Ret	12	(United Kingdom) Trevor Taylor	Team Lotus	Lotus-Climax 24	Accident	12
Ret	42	(New Zealand) Tony Shelly	John Dalton	Lotus-Climax 18/21	Head gasket	19
Ret	32	(United States) Masten Gregory	UDT-Laystall Racing Team	Lotus-BRM 24	Accident on grid	6
WD	16	(Italy) Giancarlo Baghetti	Scuderia Ferrari	Ferrari 156	Strike in Italy	-
WD	18	(Italy) Lorenzo Bandini	Scuderia Ferrari	Ferrari 156	Strike in Italy	-
WD	18	(Mexico) Ricardo Rodríguez	Scuderia Ferrari	Ferrari 156	Strike in Italy	-
WD	20	(Belgium) Willy Mairesse	Scuderia Ferrari	Ferrari 156	Strike in Italy	-
WD	42	(United Kingdom) Tony Marsh	Tony Marsh	BRM P48/57	Car not ready	-

Previous race: 1962 Crystal Palace Trophy	Formula One non-championship races 1962 season	Next race: 1962 Solitude Grand Prix
Previous race: 1957 Reims Grand Prix	Reims Grand Prix	Next race: —
