= 1962 Lavant Cup =

- Non-championship race in the 1962 Formula One season

Race details
- Date: 23 April 1962
- Official name: XIV Lavant Cup
- Location: Goodwood Circuit, West Sussex
- Course: Permanent racing facility
- Course length: 3.862 km (2.4 miles)
- Distance: 21 laps, 81.1 km (50.4 miles)

Pole position
Driver	(New Zealand) Bruce McLaren	Cooper-Climax
- Time: 1:37.0

Fastest lap
Driver	(New Zealand) Bruce McLaren	Cooper-Climax
- Time: 1:25.4

Podium
First	(New Zealand) Bruce McLaren	Cooper-Climax
Second	(United Kingdom) Roy Salvadori	Lola-Climax
Third	(New Zealand) Tony Shelly	Lotus-Climax

The 14th Lavant Cup was a motor race, run for Formula One cars, held on 23 April 1962 at Goodwood Circuit, England. The race was run over 21 laps of the circuit, and was won by New Zealand driver Bruce McLaren in a Cooper T55.

This race was held directly before the 1962 Glover Trophy, on the same day at the same circuit, with some drivers taking part in both events. Another Formula One race, the 1962 Pau Grand Prix, was also held on the same day. The Lavant Cup was normally a Formula Two race, but for 1962 it was open to Formula One cars with four-cylinder engines, thus excluding the BRMs and those cars using the Climax V8 engine. The V6 Ferraris were at the Pau event, so they were not affected by this rule.

McLaren won the race comfortably after John Surtees' car was hit by Günther Seiffert at the chicane while the Briton was lapping him.

== Results ==
Pos	No.	Driver	Entrant	Constructor	Time/Retired	Grid
1	22	(New Zealand) Bruce McLaren	Cooper Car Company	Cooper-Climax	30:31.8	1
2	6	(United Kingdom) Roy Salvadori	Bowmaker Racing Team	Lola-Climax	+ 45.8 s	5
3	17	(New Zealand) Tony Shelly	John Dalton	Lotus-Climax	+ 56.2 s	2
4	18	(United Kingdom) Keith Greene	Gilby Engineering	Gilby-Climax	20 laps	9
5	16	(United States) Jay Chamberlain	Jay Chamberlain	Lotus-Climax	19 laps	7
6	15	(United Kingdom) Graham Eden	Gerry Ashmore	Emeryson-Climax	19 laps	10
7	11	(Germany) Wolfgang Seidel	Autosport Team Wolfgang Seidel	Porsche	19 laps	8
Ret	14	(United Kingdom) Gerry Ashmore	Gerry Ashmore	Lotus-Climax	Oil pipe	12
Ret	10	(United States) Tony Settember	Emeryson Cars	Emeryson-Climax	Oil / water leaks	4
Ret	21	(United Kingdom) John Surtees	Bowmaker Racing Team	Lola-Climax	Accident	3
Ret	12	(Germany) Günther Seiffert	Autosport Team Wolfgang Seidel	Lotus-Climax	Accident	11
DNS	19	(United Kingdom) John Campbell-Jones	Emeryson Cars	Emeryson-Climax	Engine on grid	(6)
WD	24	(New Zealand) Ross Greenville	Ross Greenville	Cooper-Climax	Driver unfit	-

- Team Lotus entered a car for this race and was given No. 3, but withdrew without designating a driver.

Previous race: 1962 Lombank Trophy	Formula One non-championship races 1962 season	Next race: 1962 Glover Trophy
Previous race: 1961 Lavant Cup	Lavant Cup	Next race: 1963 Lavant Cup
