= Keith Greene =

British racing driver (1938–2021)

- Born: Keith Anthony Greene; 5 January 1938; Leytonstone, Essex, England
- Died: 8 March 2021 (aged 83); Totland Bay, Isle of Wight, England

Formula One World Championship career
- Nationality: (United Kingdom) British
- Active years: 1959–1962
- Team(s): Gilby non-works Cooper and Lotus
- Entries: 6 (3 starts)
- Championships: 0
- Wins: 0
- Podiums: 0
- Career points: 0
- Pole positions: 0
- Fastest laps: 0
- First entry: 1959 British Grand Prix
- Last entry: 1962 Italian Grand Prix

Keith Anthony Greene (5 January 1938 – 8 March 2021) was a British racing driver from England. He raced in Formula One from 1959 to 1962, participating in six World Championship Grands Prix and numerous non-Championship races.

Prior to Formula One, Greene had a successful career in sportscars. In 1956 using a Cooper T39, he competed in 11 national level races finishing outside the top six on only one occasion, with two wins and three other podium finishes.

After retiring from driving, Greene became a team manager in Formula 5000 and sports car racing. He worked for Hexagon of Highgate in London, running their newly formed motorcycle business in the mid-1970s. At that time he also managed Alain de Cadenet's Le Mans racing team. He died from cardiac arrest on 8 March 2021 at the age of 83.

== Racing record ==
=== Complete Formula One World Championship results ===
(key)

Year	Entrant	Chassis	Engine	1	2	3	4	5	6	7	8	9	10	WDC	Pts
1959	Gilby Engineering	Cooper T43	Climax FPF 1.5 L4	MON	500	NED	FRA	GBR; DNQ	GER	POR	ITA	USA		NC	0
1960	Gilby Engineering	Cooper T45	Maserati 250S 2.5 L4	ARG	MON	500	NED	BEL	FRA	GBR; Ret	POR	ITA	USA	NC	0
1961	Gilby Engineering	Gilby 61	Climax FPF 1.5 L4	MON	NED	BEL	FRA	GBR; 15	GER	ITA	USA			NC	0
1962	John Dalton	Lotus 18/21	Climax FPF 1.5 L4	NED	MON	BEL	FRA	GBR; PO‡						NC	0
1962	Gilby Engineering	Gilby 62	BRM P56 1.5 V8						GER; Ret	ITA; DNQ	USA	RSA		NC	0

‡ At the 1962 British Grand Prix, Greene drove the Lotus 18 entered by John Dalton in practice only. The car was driven in the race by Tony Shelly.

=== Complete British Saloon Car Championship results ===
(key) (Races in bold indicate pole position; races in italics indicate fastest lap.)

Year	Team	Car	Class	1	2	3	4	5	6	7	8	9	10	11	12	Pos.	Pts	Class
1963	John Willment Automobiles	Ford Cortina GT	B	SNE	OUL	GOO	AIN; 6	SIL	CRY	SIL	BRH	BRH	OUL	SIL		35th	4	13th
1966	Alan Foster	BMW 2000 TI	C	SNE	GOO	SIL; 8	CRY	BRH	BRH; Ret	OUL	BRH					30th	4	9th
1971	Wylie's of Glasgow	Ford Escort RS1600	C	BRH	SNE; 6											27th	6	9th
1971	VMW Motors	Ford Escort 1300 GT	B			THR; DNS	SIL	CRY	SIL	CRO	SIL	OUL	BRH	MAL	BRH	27th	6	NC
