= Tony Shelly =

New Zealand racing driver (1937–1998)

- Born: 2 February 1937; Wellington, New Zealand
- Died: 4 October 1998 (aged 61); Taupō, New Zealand

Formula One World Championship career
- Nationality: (New Zealand) New Zealander
- Active years: 1962
- Team: non-works Lotus
- Entries: 3 (1 start)
- Championships: 0
- Wins: 0
- Podiums: 0
- Career points: 0
- Pole positions: 0
- Fastest laps: 0
- First entry: 1962 British Grand Prix
- Last entry: 1962 Italian Grand Prix

Anthony Lionel Shelly (2 February 1937 – 4 October 1998) was a racing driver from New Zealand. He competed in Formula One in 1962, participating in three World Championship Grands Prix, and several non-Championship races. He scored no World Championship points. He also owned a BMW dealership called Shelly Motors in Honolulu. The business had previously belonged to Shelly's father and had been sold on his death. Shelly subsequently re-acquired the business and became an American citizen in 1975. He divided his time between a home in Honolulu and one in New Zealand, where he died.

== Career ==
Shelly made his motor racing debut in January 1955, entering a Morgan in the Sports Car class for the New Zealand Grand Prix. Shelly qualified but did not start the race. Shelly won "the first big race he contested" at Teretonga in 1958 driving a Cooper and went on to become a leading driver in Australia and New Zealand before moving to race in Europe in 1962. He drove mainly for John Dalton, usually in non-championship events with moderate success, a fifth in the Lombank Trophy and a third in the Lavant Cup being the highlights of his season. He was entered to 1962 Le Mans in June by Colin Chapman to co-drive with Les Leston with a Lotus 23, but the race organizer, ACO, denied the entry in the famous Lotus Le Mans debacle. He also entered three Formula One World championship events, at Aintree, where he retired with a failed cylinder head gasket, and at the Nürburgring and Monza, where he failed to qualify on each occasion. At the end of the season, he returned to New Zealand where he continued to race in 1963 and 1964, following which he retired, although he did compete occasionally thereafter.

== Complete Formula One World Championship results ==
(key)

Year	Entrant	Chassis	Engine	1	2	3	4	5	6	7	8	9	WDC	Points
1962	John Dalton	Lotus 18/21	Climax Straight-4	NED	MON	BEL	FRA	GBR; Ret	GER; DNQ				NC	0
1962	Autosport Team Wolfgang Seidel	Lotus 24	BRM V8							ITA; DNQ	USA	RSA	NC	0

=== Complete Formula One Non-Championship results ===
(key) (Races in bold indicate pole position) (Races in italics indicate fastest lap)

Year	Entrant	Chassis	Engine	1	2	3	4	5	6	7	8	9	10	11	12	13	14	15	16	17	18	19	20
1962	John Dalton	Lotus 18/21	Climax Straight-4	CAP	BRX	LOM; 5	LAV; 3	GLV; 6	PAU	AIN; 7	INT; Ret	NAP; 6	MAL; 8	CLP	RMS; Ret	SOL	KAN	MED	DAN	OUL; 5	MEX	RAN	NAT
