= Lombank Trophy =

Layout of the Snetterton Motor Racing Circuit (1951-1964)

The Lombank Trophy was a non-championship Formula One race held during the early 1960s at Snetterton Motor Racing Circuit in Norfolk, England.

The event took place early in the season and was sometimes the first Formula One race of the year. The 1961 race was the first event in Europe to be run according to the new 1.5-litre regulations for Formula One.

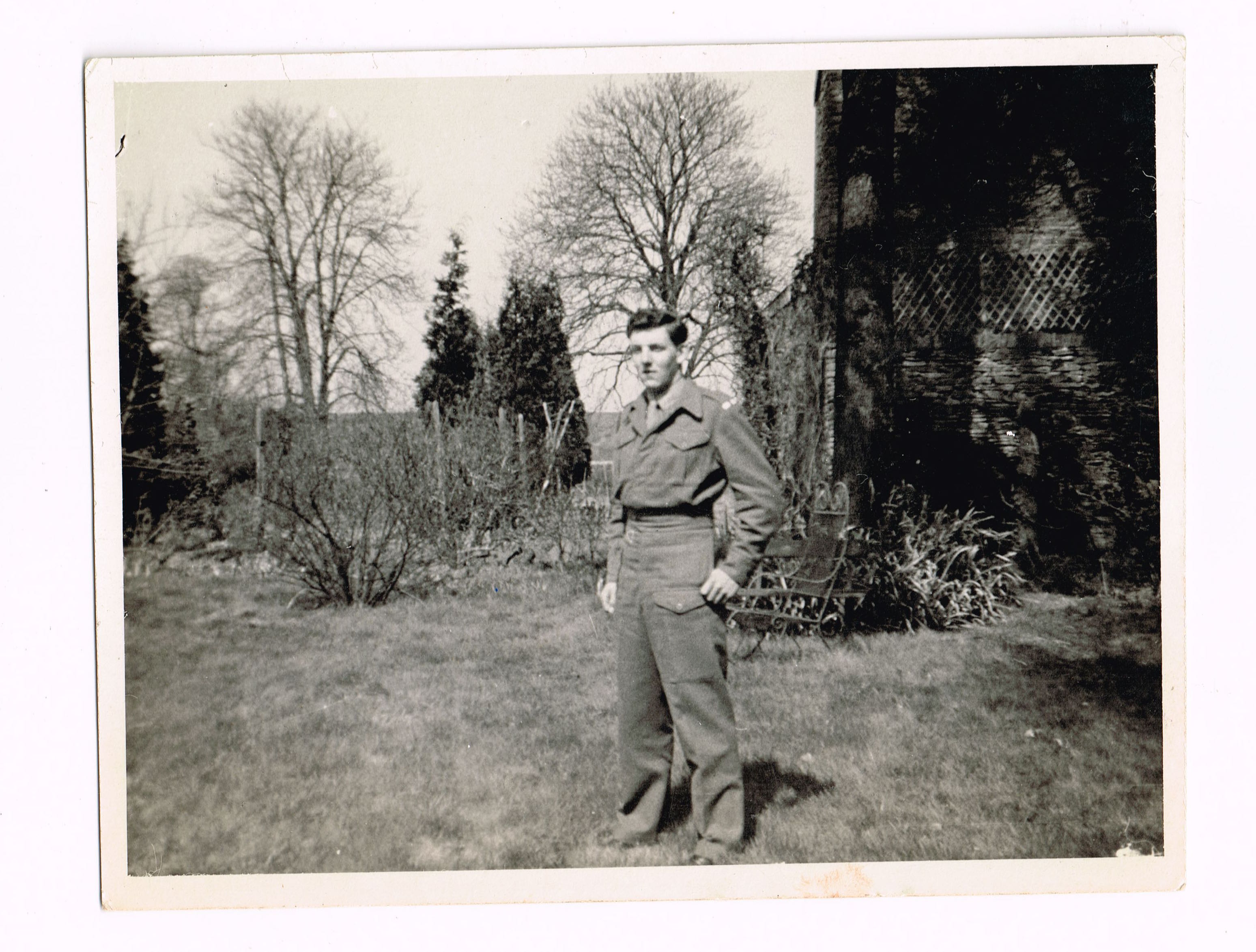
George Reid Crossman, April 1946

After the event was dropped from the Formula One calendar, the Lombank Trophy was held for Formula 3 cars at Brands Hatch Circuit in Kent in 1965. This race was marred by the fatal accident suffered by George Crossman. Crossman had previously served in the Royal Lancers, Catterick, a cavalry regiment that fought in Palestine and trained as a pilot in the Royal Air Force. When he came out of the army he started farming in Somerset and continued when he moved to Withycombe a few years later.

Later in the 1960s, the race was run as a Formula Libre event at Ingliston.

Lombank, part of the Lombard North Central finance company, also sponsored the British Formula Three Championship in the late 1960s and early 1970s. Under the Lombard name, the company also sponsored the RAC Rally for many years until the 1990s.

== Lombank Trophy Formula One results ==
Year	Winner	Car	Report
1960	(United Kingdom) Innes Ireland	Lotus 18-Climax	Report
1961	(Australia) Jack Brabham	Cooper T53-Climax	Report
1962	(United Kingdom) Jim Clark	Lotus 24-Climax	Report
1963	(United Kingdom) Graham Hill	BRM P57	Report
