= 1962 Italian Grand Prix =

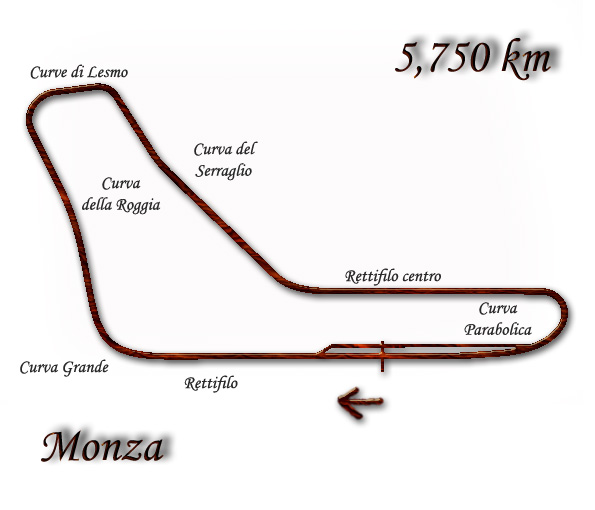

Race details
- Date: 16 September 1962
- Official name: XXXIII Gran Premio d'Italia
- Location: Autodromo Nazionale di Monza; Monza, Italy
- Course: Permanent racing facility
- Course length: 5.750 km (3.573 miles)
- Distance: 86 laps, 494.500 km (307.268 miles)
- Weather: Dry, with rain later

Pole position
| Driver | (United Kingdom) Jim Clark | Lotus-Climax |
- Time: 1:40.35

Fastest lap
| Driver | (United Kingdom) Graham Hill | BRM |
- Time: 1:42.30 on lap 3

Podium
| First | (United Kingdom) Graham Hill | BRM |
| Second | (United States) Richie Ginther | BRM |
| Third | (New Zealand) Bruce McLaren | Cooper-Climax |

The 1962 Italian Grand Prix was a Formula One motor race held at Monza on 16 September 1962. It was race 7 of 9 in both the 1962 World Championship of Drivers and the 1962 International Cup for Formula One Manufacturers. The 86-lap race was won by BRM driver Graham Hill after he started from second position. His teammate Richie Ginther finished second and Cooper driver Bruce McLaren came in third.

== Race report ==
Jim Clark started on pole position, but the Lotus team still looked worried as the team had gone through all of their gearboxes over the weekend. Two crates of spare parts were flown down, but nonetheless Clark and Trevor Taylor started with no more spares available. After only two laps Clark pitted with the expected transmission trouble; he made it back onto the track for another ten laps but that was it. Teammate Taylor managed 25 laps before his race ended. Hill kept stretching his lead out and finished nearly a half minute before Richie Ginther in the other BRM. Ginther had been duelling with Surtees throughout the race, but on lap 38 Surtees slowed down and five laps later he retired with engine troubles. Behind these two, there was a race long three-way fight between Dan Gurney's Porsche and the Coopers of McLaren and Maggs. The cars swapped positions constantly, coming down the straight on the fiftieth lap three abreast. Maggs had to stop for more fuel, unlike McLaren whose car had been fitted with 170-litre (45 US gal) fuel tanks to enable him to run the entire distance. Meanwhile, Willy Mairesse in the new non-sharknose Ferrari 156 had caught up to the third-place contenders and brought Jo Bonnier and Giancarlo Baghetti with him.

Gurney's car was pressed too hard and he retired on the 66th lap with a broken rear differential. After this, the positions stabilized a bit, although not until after Baghetti had briefly led the pack to the appreciation of local fans. Bonnier's clutch began slipping and Baghetti also fell back. Mairesse took third on the eightieth lap, and built up a three-second lead over McLaren. Stirling Moss, who was watching from the speaker tower, began betting people that McLaren would take third and he was right: in the first curve of the last lap, McLaren passed Mairesse and he took third by only 0.4 seconds. Bonnier's clutch troubles allowed Baghetti to pass him for fifth place near the end of the race. Phil Hill had to suffer being lapped before half of the race was over, and had to make a long pit stop with engine troubles and finished twelfth. Rodríguez' Ferrari lost oil pressure, Innes Ireland had a good race until something snapped in the steering, and Masten Gregory's car was overheating and then only ran in fourth gear for the last laps. The fire extinguisher in Roy Salvadori's Bowmaker-Yeoman Lola exploded in his face during practice.

== Classification ==
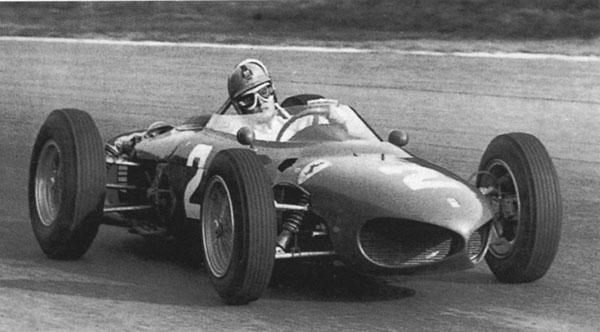
Giancarlo Baghetti placed fifth in the race driving a Ferrari 156

=== Qualifying ===
| Pos | No | Driver | Constructor | Qualifying times | | Gap |
| Pos | No | Driver | Constructor | Q1 | Q2 | Gap |
|---|---|---|---|---|---|---|
| 1 | 20 | (United Kingdom) Jim Clark | Lotus-Climax | 1:41.5 | 1:40.35 | — |
| 2 | 14 | (United Kingdom) Graham Hill | BRM | 1:40.7 | 1:40.38 | +0.03 |
| 3 | 12 | (United States) Richie Ginther | BRM | 1:42.8 | 1:41.1 | +0.75 |
| 4 | 28 | (New Zealand) Bruce McLaren | Cooper-Climax | 1:41.8 | 1:41.8 | +1.45 |
| 5 | 40 | (United Kingdom) Innes Ireland | Lotus-Climax | 1:42.0 | 1:41.8 | +1.45 |
| 6 | 38 | (United States) Masten Gregory | Lotus-BRM | 1:41.9 | No time | +1.55 |
| 7 | 16 | (United States) Dan Gurney | Porsche | 1:42.2 | 1:41.9 | +1.55 |
| 8 | 46 | (United Kingdom) John Surtees | Lola-Climax | 1:42.4 | No time | +2.05 |
| 9 | 18 | (Sweden) Jo Bonnier | Porsche | 1:43.0 | 1:42.6 | +2.25 |
| 10 | 8 | (Belgium) Willy Mairesse | Ferrari | 1:42.9 | 1:42.8 | +2.45 |
| 11 | 4 | (Mexico) Ricardo Rodríguez | Ferrari | 1:43.1 | No time | +2.75 |
| 12 | 30 | (South Africa) Tony Maggs | Cooper-Climax | 1:46.2 | 1:43.2 | +2.85 |
| 13 | 44 | (United Kingdom) Roy Salvadori | Lola-Climax | 1:43.9 | 1:43.3 | +2.95 |
| 14 | 24 | (Italy) Nino Vaccarella | Lotus-Climax | 1:50.8 | 1:43.4 | +3.05 |
| 15 | 10 | (United States) Phil Hill | Ferrari | 1:43.4 | No time | +3.05 |
| 16 | 22 | (United Kingdom) Trevor Taylor | Lotus-Climax | 1:45.4 | 1:44.2 | +3.85 |
| 17 | 6 | (Italy) Lorenzo Bandini | Ferrari | 1:44.4 | 1:44.3 | +3.95 |
| 18 | 2 | (Italy) Giancarlo Baghetti | Ferrari | 1:45.1 | 1:44.4 | +4.05 |
| 19 | 36 | (France) Maurice Trintignant | Lotus-Climax | 1:44.4 | No time | +4.05 |
| 20 | 32 | (Netherlands) Carel Godin de Beaufort | Porsche | 1:47.4 | 1:46.8 | +6.45 |
| 21 | 48 | (United States) Tony Settember | Emeryson-Climax | 1:49.1 | No time | +8.75 |
| 22 | 60 | (New Zealand) Tony Shelly | Lotus-BRM | No time | 1:51.6 | +11.25 |
| 23 | 56 | (United Kingdom) Keith Greene | Gilby-BRM | 1:52.0 | No time | +11.65 |
| 24 | 52 | (United Kingdom) Gerry Ashmore | Lotus-Climax | 1:54.2 | 1:52.9 | +12.55 |
| 25 | 62 | (United Kingdom) Ian Burgess | Cooper-Climax | 1:53.1 | No time | +12.75 |
| 26 | 42 | (Switzerland) Jo Siffert | Lotus-BRM | 1:55.8 | No time | +15.45 |
| 27 | 54 | (Italy) Ernesto Prinoth | Lotus-Climax | 1:57.7 | No time | +17.35 |
| 28 | 50 | (Italy) Roberto Lippi | De Tomaso-O.S.C.A. | 1:58.6 | No time | +18.25 |
| 29 | 26 | (United States) Jay Chamberlain | Lotus-Climax | 1:59.7 | No time | +19.35 |
| 30 | 34 | (Argentina) Nasif Estéfano | De Tomaso | 6:18.4 | No time | +4:38.05 |

* Grid limited to 22 cars, provided their time was within 110% of 2nd place. As only 19 drivers managed to be fulfilled the requirements, the grid was reduced to 21 cars.

=== Race ===
| Pos | No | Driver | Constructor | Laps | Time/Retired | Grid | Points |
|---|---|---|---|---|---|---|---|
| 1 | 14 | (United Kingdom) Graham Hill | BRM | 86 | 2:29:08.4 | 2 | 9 |
| 2 | 12 | (United States) Richie Ginther | BRM | 86 | + 29.8 | 3 | 6 |
| 3 | 28 | (New Zealand) Bruce McLaren | Cooper-Climax | 86 | + 57.8 | 4 | 4 |
| 4 | 8 | (Belgium) Willy Mairesse | Ferrari | 86 | + 58.2 | 10 | 3 |
| 5 | 2 | (Italy) Giancarlo Baghetti | Ferrari | 86 | + 1:31.3 | 18 | 2 |
| 6 | 18 | (Sweden) Jo Bonnier | Porsche | 85 | + 1 Lap | 9 | 1 |
| 7 | 30 | (South Africa) Tony Maggs | Cooper-Climax | 85 | + 1 Lap | 12 | |
| 8 | 6 | (Italy) Lorenzo Bandini | Ferrari | 84 | + 2 Laps | 17 | |
| 9 | 24 | (Italy) Nino Vaccarella | Lotus-Climax | 84 | + 2 Laps | 14 | |
| 10 | 32 | (Netherlands) Carel Godin de Beaufort | Porsche | 81 | + 5 Laps | 20 | |
| 11 | 10 | (United States) Phil Hill | Ferrari | 81 | + 5 Laps | 15 | |
| 12 | 38 | (United States) Masten Gregory | Lotus-BRM | 77 | + 9 Laps | 6 | |
| 13 | 16 | (United States) Dan Gurney | Porsche | 66 | Differential | 7 | |
| 14 | 4 | (Mexico) Ricardo Rodríguez | Ferrari | 63 | Ignition | 11 | |
| Ret | 40 | (United Kingdom) Innes Ireland | Lotus-Climax | 45 | Suspension | 5 | |
| Ret | 46 | (United Kingdom) John Surtees | Lola-Climax | 42 | Engine | 8 | |
| Ret | 44 | (United Kingdom) Roy Salvadori | Lola-Climax | 41 | Engine | 13 | |
| Ret | 22 | (United Kingdom) Trevor Taylor | Lotus-Climax | 25 | Gearbox | 16 | |
| Ret | 48 | (United States) Tony Settember | Emeryson-Climax | 18 | Engine | 21 | |
| Ret | 36 | (France) Maurice Trintignant | Lotus-Climax | 17 | Electrical | 19 | |
| Ret | 20 | (United Kingdom) Jim Clark | Lotus-Climax | 12 | Gearbox | 1 | |
| DNQ | 60 | (New Zealand) Tony Shelly | Lotus-BRM | | | | |
| DNQ | 56 | (United Kingdom) Keith Greene | Gilby-BRM | | | | |
| DNQ | 52 | (United Kingdom) Gerry Ashmore | Lotus-Climax | | | | |
| DNQ | 62 | (United Kingdom) Ian Burgess | Cooper-Climax | | | | |
| DNQ | 42 | (Switzerland) Jo Siffert | Lotus-BRM | | | | |
| DNQ | 54 | (Italy) Ernesto Prinoth | Lotus-Climax | | | | |
| DNQ | 50 | (Italy) Roberto Lippi | De Tomaso-O.S.C.A. | | | | |
| DNQ | 26 | (United States) Jay Chamberlain | Lotus-Climax | | | | |
| DNQ | 34 | (Argentina) Nasif Estéfano | De Tomaso | | | | |
| WD | 58 | (Germany) Kurt Kuhnke | Lotus-Borgward | | Car not ready | | |

== Championship standings after the race ==
Drivers' Championship standings

| | Pos | Driver | Points |
|---|---|---|---|
| | 1 | (United Kingdom) Graham Hill | 36 (37) |
| 2 | 2 | (New Zealand) Bruce McLaren | 22 |
| 1 | 3 | (United Kingdom) Jim Clark | 21 |
| 1 | 4 | (United Kingdom) John Surtees | 19 |
| | 5 | (United States) Phil Hill | 14 |

Constructors' Championship standings

| | Pos | Constructor | Points |
|---|---|---|---|
| | 1 | (United Kingdom) BRM | 37 (41) |
| | 2 | (United Kingdom) Lotus-Climax | 27 |
| | 3 | (United Kingdom) Cooper-Climax | 25 (27) |
| | 4 | (United Kingdom) Lola-Climax | 19 |
| 1 | 5 | (Italy) Ferrari | 18 |

- Notes: Only the top five positions are included for both sets of standings. Only the best 5 results counted towards the Championship. Numbers without parentheses are Championship points; numbers in parentheses are total points scored.

| Previous race: 1962 German Grand Prix | FIA Formula One World Championship; 1962 season | Next race: 1962 United States Grand Prix |
| Previous race: 1961 Italian Grand Prix | Italian Grand Prix | Next race: 1963 Italian Grand Prix |
