= 1962 British Grand Prix =

5th race of the 1962 Formula One Championship

Race details
- Date: 21 July 1962
- Official name: 15th RAC British Grand Prix
- Location: Aintree Motor Racing Circuit; Aintree, England
- Course: Permanent racing facility
- Course length: 4.828 km (3.000 miles)
- Distance: 75 laps, 362.100 km (225.000 miles)
- Weather: Sunny

Pole position
Driver	(United Kingdom) Jim Clark	Lotus-Climax
- Time: 1:53.6

Fastest lap
Driver	(United Kingdom) Jim Clark	Lotus-Climax
- Time: 1:55.0 on lap 36

Podium
First	(United Kingdom) Jim Clark	Lotus-Climax
Second	(United Kingdom) John Surtees	Lola-Climax
Third	(New Zealand) Bruce McLaren	Cooper-Climax

The 1962 British Grand Prix was a Formula One motor race held at Aintree on 21 July 1962. It was race 5 of 9 in both the 1962 World Championship of Drivers and the 1962 International Cup for Formula One Manufacturers. This was the last race at Aintree. From 1963 onwards, the race would be held at Silverstone or Brands Hatch. Scotsman Jim Clark dominated the race, driving a Lotus 25. It was considered a power track, benefitting the light and powerful Lotus and Lola cars in particular. Ferrari were still sidelined due to the Italian metal workers' strike but managed to send one car for Phil Hill.

== Race ==
It was not a particularly exciting race, with Clark leading from start to finish and fairly large gaps between the cars. Out of the twentyone starters, six still had four-cylinder engines while the rest were multi-cylinder cars. These cars were in a sort of class of their own, with Jackie Lewis finishing best of the four-cylinder cars. John Surtees' Lola started and finished in second place, in spite of having lost second gear on the tenth lap. Dan Gurney was hopeful after winning in France and at the non-championship Solitude race in the preceding two weeks. He began the race in third but had a slipping clutch and slid steadily down the field, ending in ninth position. His teammate Jo Bonnier had to retire with a broken transmission. Bruce McLaren (Cooper) passed Gurney after twelve laps and finished in third. Graham Hill pushed his BRM hard but had to settle for fourth, and was threatened by Jack Brabham in the closing stages. Brabham, however, had burns on his right foot since lap 40 and was in a lot of pain. He finished fifth, ahead of Tony Maggs' Cooper. Brabham had hoped to start in his own car after his mechanics had worked days and nights, but at 3 am the morning before the race it was discovered that they had been supplied with the wrong exhaust system. The Brabham BT3 had to wait until Nürburgring two weeks later to make its first appearance.

Innes Ireland had perhaps the day's biggest disappointment. After having qualified his Climax-engined UDT/Laystall Lotus 24 on the first row, the gear shifter bent on his first lap, leaving him with only three gears. He had to pit immediately after start and finished last, after having spent several laps repairing the car. Trevor Taylor was anxious to have a good race after several recent collisions and started well. Soon, however, he had to pit with a loose carburettor, and only managed an eighth place in his Lotus 24. Phil Hill's Ferrari, meanwhile, was totally outclassed by the British cars in spite of its new six-speed gearbox. He never ran higher than tenth and had to retire with ignition troubles.

== Classification ==
=== Qualifying ===
Pos	No	Driver	Constructor	Qualifying times				Gap
Pos	No	Driver	Constructor	Q1	Q2	Q3	Q4	Gap
1	20	(United Kingdom) Jim Clark	Lotus-Climax	1:55.6	1:54.0	1:55.0	1:53.6	—
2	24	(United Kingdom) John Surtees	Lola-Climax	1:55.8	1:55.0	1:54.2	1:58.8	+0.6
3	32	(United Kingdom) Innes Ireland	Lotus-Climax	1:55.2	1:55.8	1:54.4	No time	+0.8
4	16	(New Zealand) Bruce McLaren	Cooper-Climax	2:02.0	1:56.6	1:54.6	1:54.6	+1.0
5	12	(United Kingdom) Graham Hill	BRM	1:55.8	No time	1:55.0	1:54.6	+1.0
6	8	(United States) Dan Gurney	Porsche	1:55.2	1:54.8	1:56.8	1:55.8	+1.2
7	10	(Sweden) Jo Bonnier	Porsche	1:56.0	1:55.2	2:00.6	1:55.4	+1.6
8	14	(United States) Richie Ginther	BRM	1:55.2	1:55.6	1:55.2	1:56.8	+1.6
9	30	(Australia) Jack Brabham	Lotus-Climax	No time	1:55.8	1:56.0	1:55.4	+1.8
10	22	(United Kingdom) Trevor Taylor	Lotus-Climax	1:56.8	1:56.4	1:56.0	1:56.4	+2.4
11	26	(United Kingdom) Roy Salvadori	Lola-Climax	1:57.4	1:57.4	1:56.2	1:59.0	+2.6
12	2	(United States) Phil Hill	Ferrari	1:58.6	1:57.8	1:56.6	1:56.2	+2.6
13	18	(South Africa) Tony Maggs	Cooper-Climax	No time	2:06.0	1:59.0	1:57.0	+3.4
14	34	(United States) Masten Gregory	Lotus-Climax	1:58.0	1:57.2	1:58.6	1:57.4	+3.6
15	42	(United Kingdom) Jackie Lewis	Cooper-Climax	2:08.6	2:02.4	2:00.4	1:59.4	+5.8
16	36	(United Kingdom) Ian Burgess	Cooper-Climax	No time	2:01.6	2:01.6	2:00.6	+7.0
17	54	(Netherlands) Carel Godin de Beaufort	Porsche	2:02.0	2:01.4	No time	2:01.4	+7.8
18	48	(New Zealand) Tony Shelly	Lotus-Climax	2:03.6	2:02.4	2:08.2	No time	+8.8
19	40	(United States) Tony Settember	Emeryson-Climax	2:06.0	2:03.2	2:02.4	2:03.6	+8.8
20	46	(United States) Jay Chamberlain	Lotus-Climax	No time	2:05.6	2:04.6	2:03.4	+9.8
21	44	(Germany) Wolfgang Seidel	Lotus-BRM	No time	No time	2:25.6	2:11.6	+18.0

=== Race ===
Pos	No	Driver	Constructor	Laps	Time/Retired	Grid	Points
1	20	(United Kingdom) Jim Clark	Lotus-Climax	75	2:26:20.8	1	9
2	24	(United Kingdom) John Surtees	Lola-Climax	75	+ 49.2	2	6
3	16	(New Zealand) Bruce McLaren	Cooper-Climax	75	+ 1:44.8	4	4
4	12	(United Kingdom) Graham Hill	BRM	75	+ 1:56.8	5	3
5	30	(Australia) Jack Brabham	Lotus-Climax	74	+ 1 Lap	9	2
6	18	(South Africa) Tony Maggs	Cooper-Climax	74	+ 1 Lap	13	1
7	34	(United States) Masten Gregory	Lotus-Climax	74	+ 1 Lap	14	
8	22	(United Kingdom) Trevor Taylor	Lotus-Climax	74	+ 1 Lap	10	
9	8	(United States) Dan Gurney	Porsche	73	+ 2 Laps	6	
10	42	(United Kingdom) Jackie Lewis	Cooper-Climax	72	+ 3 Laps	15	
11	40	(United States) Tony Settember	Emeryson-Climax	71	+ 4 Laps	19	
12	36	(United Kingdom) Ian Burgess	Cooper-Climax	71	+ 4 laps	16	
13	14	(United States) Richie Ginther	BRM	70	+ 5 Laps	8	
14	54	(Netherlands) Carel Godin de Beaufort	Porsche	69	+ 6 Laps	17	
15	46	(United States) Jay Chamberlain	Lotus-Climax	64	+ 11 Laps	20	
16	32	(United Kingdom) Innes Ireland	Lotus-Climax	61	+ 14 Laps	3	
Ret	2	(United States) Phil Hill	Ferrari	47	Engine	12	
Ret	26	(United Kingdom) Roy Salvadori	Lola-Climax	35	Battery	11	
Ret	10	(Sweden) Jo Bonnier	Porsche	27	Differential	7	
Ret	44	(Germany) Wolfgang Seidel	Lotus-BRM	11	Brakes	21	
Ret	48	(New Zealand) Tony Shelly	Lotus-Climax	6	Engine	18	
DNS	48	(United Kingdom) Keith Greene	Lotus-Climax		Practice only - Shelly's car		
WD	28	(France) Maurice Trintignant	Lotus-Climax		Car damaged		
WD	38	(United Kingdom) John Campbell-Jones	Emeryson-Climax		Driver unfit		
WD	50	(United Kingdom) Keith Greene	Gilby-BRM		Car not ready		
WD	52	(Switzerland) Jo Siffert	Lotus-BRM		Insufficient starting money		

- Scuderia Ferrari withdrew their other two entries, cars #4 and #6, to which drivers had not been allocated.

== Championship standings after the race ==
Drivers' Championship standings

	Pos	Driver	Points
	1	(United Kingdom) Graham Hill	19
2	2	(United Kingdom) Jim Clark	18
	3	(New Zealand) Bruce McLaren	16
2	4	(United States) Phil Hill	14
2	5	(United Kingdom) John Surtees	13

Constructors' Championship standings

	Pos	Constructor	Points
2	1	(United Kingdom) Lotus-Climax	24
1	2	(United Kingdom) BRM	23
1	3	(United Kingdom) Cooper-Climax	21
	4	(Italy) Ferrari	14
1	5	(United Kingdom) Lola-Climax	13

- Notes: Only the top five positions are included for both sets of standings.

Previous race: 1962 French Grand Prix	FIA Formula One World Championship; 1962 season	Next race: 1962 German Grand Prix
Previous race: 1961 British Grand Prix	British Grand Prix	Next race: 1963 British Grand Prix
