= 1962 United States Grand Prix =

Race details
- Date: October 7, 1962
- Official name: V United States Grand Prix
- Location: Watkins Glen Grand Prix Race Course; Watkins Glen, New York
- Course: Permanent road course
- Course length: 3.78 km (2.35 miles)
- Distance: 100 laps, 378 km (235 miles)
- Weather: Sunny

Pole position
Driver	(United Kingdom) Jim Clark	Lotus-Climax
- Time: 1:15.8

Fastest lap
Driver	(United Kingdom) Jim Clark	Lotus-Climax
- Time: 1:15.0 on lap 70

Podium
First	(United Kingdom) Jim Clark	Lotus-Climax
Second	(United Kingdom) Graham Hill	BRM
Third	(New Zealand) Bruce McLaren	Cooper-Climax

The 1962 United States Grand Prix was a Formula One motor race held on October 7, 1962, at the Watkins Glen Grand Prix Race Course in Watkins Glen, New York. It was race 8 of 9 in both the 1962 World Championship of Drivers and the 1962 International Cup for Formula One Manufacturers. The 100-lap race was won by Lotus driver Jim Clark after starting from pole position. Graham Hill finished second for the BRM team and Cooper driver Bruce McLaren came in third.

By taking his third win of the season, Clark maintained his slim title hopes heading into the final round of the season with a nine-point-deficit over title rival Graham Hill with nine points up for grabs. McLaren, however, was mathematically eliminated from championship contention after this round.

== Summary ==
New Lotus star Jim Clark of Scotland took his third victory of the season, and the third of his career, to keep alive his hopes of catching Graham Hill for the 1962 World Driver's Championship with one race remaining. Hill finished nine seconds back in second place for BRM, while Bruce McLaren was third, despite being a lap down.

For the third consecutive year, Ferrari had decided not to make the trip across the Atlantic for the American race. It had been a miserable year for the team, finishing sixth in the eight-team Constructor's Championship (without a victory), after winning it the year before. The powerful new V8 engines built by Climax and BRM for the second year of the 1.5-liter formula had taken the series by storm, and Ferrari's advantage from 1961 had been completely erased.

Also, as a result, defending World Champion Phil Hill was again without a drive in his home country, and, worse yet, the American learned from a reliable source at The Glen that he had been fired. In Saturday's Q2, when bad weather prevented improvements of Q1 times, he drove some laps with the No. 11 Porsche of Jo Bonnier.

In Friday's qualifying session, Graham Hill, Hill's BRM teammate Richie Ginther, Clark and Jack Brabham (using his own BT3 model for just the second time) all bettered the previous year's lap record of 1:18.2. Clark then went out and shattered the absolute course record, set under the 2.5-liter formula by Stirling Moss, with a staggering 1:15.8. Damp and misty conditions on Saturday prohibited anyone improving their Friday time, so the top six were Clark in the Lotus, Ginther and Hill's BRM's, American Dan Gurney in a Porsche, Brabham, and McLaren's Cooper.

By race time on Sunday, there were 40,000 fans braving the cold winds and a threat of rain. At the start, Clark led off the grid, while Hill jumped into second behind him. With Ginther, Brabham, Gurney and McLaren following, the two Championship rivals pulled away, already lowering the F1 track record on lap 3. Gurney got by Brabham and Ginther and briefly took third place, but on lap 11, Ginther retook the spot behind his teammate when Gurney slid half off the track, inches from the Armco, on a patch of oil in the Loop.

On lap 12, the two leaders were already coming up to lap the tail-enders. When Clark was delayed in the traffic, Hill took the lead away from him. By lap 19, however, Clark had lowered the lap record to 1:15.4, well under his qualifying time, and retaken the lead for good. Ginther was struggling with a deteriorating gearbox and began to fall back until a missed shift on lap 35 blew the engine and ended a fine run.

As Clark continued comfortably ahead of Hill, McLaren was now hounding Gurney for third place. The New Zealander's Cooper slid by on lap 57, and soon after, Gurney began losing power in the Porsche's engine. Brabham closed the gap between them, and when he grabbed fourth place from the American on lap 69, he claimed the first Championship points ever scored by the Brabham make.

Clark and Hill were the only cars on the lead lap toward the end as both lapped repeatedly under their grid times. Clark eventually clocked a 1:15.0 on lap 70 for the fastest lap of the race, and eased off from his biggest lead of 17 seconds to take the second consecutive American Grand Prix win for Team Lotus. "I planned to get in front and stay there," Clark said. "I set up the car for dry weather just before we started. I sure am glad the weather held up!" Indeed, moments after the Scot had taken the checkered flag, a drizzle began to fall.

== Classification ==
=== Qualifying ===
Pos	No	Driver	Constructor	Qualifying times		Gap
Pos	No	Driver	Constructor	Q1	Q2	Gap
1	8	(United Kingdom) Jim Clark	Lotus-Climax	1:15.8	1:22.1	—
2	5	(United States) Richie Ginther	BRM	1:16.6	1:24.0	+0.8
3	4	(United Kingdom) Graham Hill	BRM	1:16.7	1:22.1	+0.9
4	10	(United States) Dan Gurney	Porsche	1:16.9	1:24.2	+1.1
5	17	(Australia) Jack Brabham	Brabham-Climax	1:16.9	1:27.8	+1.1
6	21	(New Zealand) Bruce McLaren	Cooper-Climax	1:17.1	1:24.5	+1.3
7	16	(United States) Masten Gregory	Lotus-BRM	1:17.9	No time	+2.1
8	9	(United Kingdom) Trevor Taylor	Lotus-Climax	1:18.0	1:28.7	+2.2
9	11	(Sweden) Jo Bonnier	Porsche	1:19.0	1:28.4	+3.2
10	22	(South Africa) Tony Maggs	Cooper-Climax	1:19.7	1:30.8	+3.9
11	19	(United Kingdom) Roy Salvadori	Lola-Climax	1:19.8	1:33.5	+4.0
12	23	(United States) Timmy Mayer	Cooper-Climax	1:20.7	1:29.2	+4.9
13	14	(United States) Roger Penske	Lotus-Climax	1:21.3	1:28.9	+5.5
14	12	(Netherlands) Carel Godin de Beaufort	Porsche	1:21.8	1:26.3	+6.0
15	24	(United States) Hap Sharp	Cooper-Climax	1:22.4	No time	+6.6
16	15	(United Kingdom) Innes Ireland	Lotus-Climax	1:24.0	1:25.8	+8.2
17	26	(United States) Rob Schroeder	Lotus-Climax	1:24.0	1:28.8	+8.2
18	25	(United States) Jim Hall	Lotus-Climax	1:24.7	No time	+8.9
19	6	(France) Maurice Trintignant	Lotus-Climax	1:25.8	1:28.5	+10.0
20	18	(United Kingdom) John Surtees	Lola-Climax	(1:18.1)	1:29.2	+13.4
	11	(United States) Phil Hill	Porsche	—	1:32.6	+16.8

=== Race ===
Pos	No	Driver	Constructor	Laps	Time/Retired	Grid	Points
1	8	(United Kingdom) Jim Clark	Lotus-Climax	100	2:07:13.0	1	9
2	4	(United Kingdom) Graham Hill	BRM	100	+ 9.2	3	6
3	21	(New Zealand) Bruce McLaren	Cooper-Climax	99	+ 1 Lap	6	4
4	17	(Australia) Jack Brabham	Brabham-Climax	99	+ 1 Lap	5	3
5	10	(United States) Dan Gurney	Porsche	99	+ 1 Lap	4	2
6	16	(United States) Masten Gregory	Lotus-BRM	99	+ 1 Lap	7	1
7	22	(South Africa) Tony Maggs	Cooper-Climax	97	+ 3 Laps	10	
8	15	(United Kingdom) Innes Ireland	Lotus-Climax	96	+ 4 Laps	16	
9	14	(United States) Roger Penske	Lotus-Climax	96	+ 4 Laps	13	
10	26	(United States) Rob Schroeder	Lotus-Climax	93	+ 7 Laps	17	
11	24	(United States) Hap Sharp	Cooper-Climax	91	+ 9 Laps	15	
12	9	(United Kingdom) Trevor Taylor	Lotus-Climax	85	+ 15 Laps	8	
13	11	(Sweden) Jo Bonnier	Porsche	79	+ 21 Laps	9	
Ret	5	(United States) Richie Ginther	BRM	35	Engine	2	
Ret	6	(France) Maurice Trintignant	Lotus-Climax	32	Brakes	19	
Ret	23	(United States) Timmy Mayer	Cooper-Climax	31	Ignition	12	
Ret	18	(United Kingdom) John Surtees	Lola-Climax	19	Engine	20	
Ret	12	(Netherlands) Carel Godin de Beaufort	Porsche	9	Accident	14	
DNS	19	(United Kingdom) Roy Salvadori	Lola-Climax		Car raced by Surtees		
DNS	25	(United States) Jim Hall	Lotus-Climax		Engine in practice		
DNS	11	(United States) Phil Hill	Porsche		Car raced by Bonnier		

- Scuderia Ferrari were entered for the race as #1, 2 and 3, but nominated neither cars nor drivers.
- #7 was allocated to Rob Walker Racing Team, but this entry was not fulfilled either.

== Championship standings after the race ==
Drivers' Championship standings

	Pos	Driver	Points
	1	(United Kingdom) Graham Hill	39 (43)
1	2	(United Kingdom) Jim Clark	30
1	3	(New Zealand) Bruce McLaren	24 (26)
	4	(United Kingdom) John Surtees	19
1	5	(United States) Dan Gurney	15

Constructors' Championship standings

	Pos	Constructor	Points
	1	(United Kingdom) BRM	39 (47)
	2	(United Kingdom) Lotus-Climax	36
	3	(United Kingdom) Cooper-Climax	27 (31)
	4	(United Kingdom) Lola-Climax	19
1	5	(Germany) Porsche	18 (19)

- Notes: Only the top five positions are included for both sets of standings. Only the best 5 results counted towards the Championship. Numbers without parentheses are Championship points; numbers in parentheses are total points scored.

Previous race: 1962 Italian Grand Prix	FIA Formula One World Championship; 1962 season	Next race: 1962 South African Grand Prix
Previous race: 1961 United States Grand Prix	United States Grand Prix	Next race: 1963 United States Grand Prix
