= 1962 Belgian Grand Prix =

3rd round of the 1962 Formula One championship

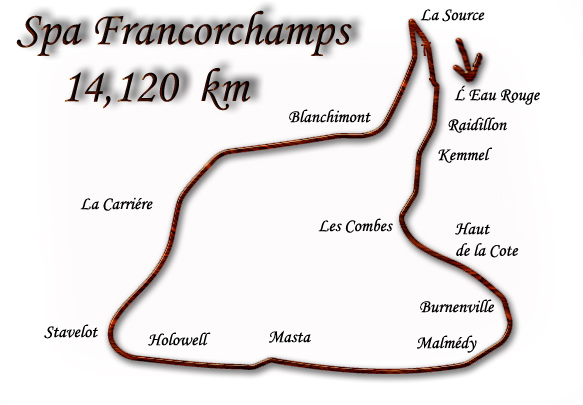

Race details
- Date: 17 June 1962
- Official name: XXII Grand Prix de Belgique
- Location: Circuit de Spa-Francorchamps; Spa, Belgium
- Course: Temporary road circuit
- Course length: 14.100 km (8.761 miles)
- Distance: 32 laps, 451.200 km (280.363 miles)
- Weather: Sunny

Pole position
Driver	(United Kingdom) Graham Hill	BRM
- Time: 3:57.0

Fastest lap
Driver	(United Kingdom) Jim Clark	Lotus-Climax
- Time: 3:55.6 on lap 15

Podium
First	(United Kingdom) Jim Clark	Lotus-Climax
Second	(United Kingdom) Graham Hill	BRM
Third	(United States) Phil Hill	Ferrari

The 1962 Belgian Grand Prix was a Formula One motor race held at Spa-Francorchamps on 17 June 1962. It was race 3 of 9 in both the 1962 World Championship of Drivers and the 1962 International Cup for Formula One Manufacturers. This race was notable for being the first Grand Prix win for Jim Clark, and the first of four consecutive victories at Spa for the Scotsman (despite thoroughly disliking the circuit) and Team Lotus. It was also the first win for the famous Lotus 25, and the beginning of the famous 6-year-long rivalry between Clark and Graham Hill. This race was held the same day as the 1962 FIFA World Cup Final in Santiago, Chile, but that event took place later in the day from this Grand Prix.

The Porsche factory team skipped this race due to large metal workers' union strikes in (West) Germany. While Carel Godin de Beaufort raced his private 718, Jo Bonnier remained absent and Dan Gurney practised with a private Lotus-BRM, but did not start.

Ricardo Rodríguez became the youngest driver to score championship points (20 years, 123 days), a record which stood for 38 years before Jenson Button, aged 20 years, 67 days, broke it at the 2000 Brazilian Grand Prix. Trevor Taylor and Willy Mairesse were fighting for 2nd place until the 2 cars touched, crashed into a ditch and Mairesse's car landed upside down and caught fire. Both drivers were thrown out of their cars, but were unhurt.

== Classification ==
=== Qualifying ===
Pos	No	Driver	Constructor	Qualifying times		Gap
Pos	No	Driver	Constructor	Q1	Q2	Gap
1	1	(United Kingdom) Graham Hill	BRM	4:01.2	3:57.0	—
2	25	(New Zealand) Bruce McLaren	Cooper-Climax	4:04.7	3:58.8	+1.8
3	17	(United Kingdom) Trevor Taylor	Lotus-Climax	3:59.3	4:00.5	+2.3
4	9	(United States) Phil Hill	Ferrari	3:59.8	3:59.6	+2.6
5	20	(United Kingdom) Innes Ireland	Lotus-Climax	4:05.1	3:59.8	+2.8
6	10	(Belgium) Willy Mairesse	Ferrari	4:01.4	3:59.8	+2.8
7	12	(Mexico) Ricardo Rodríguez	Ferrari	4:05.1	4:01.0	+4.0
8	21	(United States) Masten Gregory	Lotus-BRM	4:05.7	4:01.0	+4.0
9	2	(United States) Richie Ginther	BRM	4:04.3	4:01.4	+4.4
10	26	(South Africa) Tony Maggs	Cooper-Climax	4:22.6	4:03.6	+6.6
11	5	(United Kingdom) John Surtees	Lola-Climax	4:29.0	4:04.4	+7.4
12	16	(United Kingdom) Jim Clark	Lotus-Climax	4:09.2	4:04.9	+7.9
13	7	(Netherlands) Carel Godin de Beaufort	Porsche	4:12.6	4:07.7	+10.7
14	11	(Italy) Giancarlo Baghetti	Ferrari	4:08.0	No time	+11.0
15	15	(Australia) Jack Brabham	Lotus-Climax	No time	4:08.2	+11.2
16	18	(France) Maurice Trintignant	Lotus-Climax	4:35.5	4:09.2	+12.2
17	22	(Switzerland) Jo Siffert	Lotus-Climax	4:11.6	4:17.1	+14.6
18	19	(Belgium) Lucien Bianchi	Lotus-Climax	4:25.4	4:18.0	+21.0
19	4	(United Kingdom) John Campbell-Jones	Lotus-Climax	No time	4:26.9	+29.9
20	23	(United States) Dan Gurney	Lotus-BRM	No time	6:42.2	+2:45.2

=== Race ===
Pos	No	Driver	Constructor	Laps	Time/Retired	Grid	Points
1	16	(United Kingdom) Jim Clark	Lotus-Climax	32	2:07:32.3	12	9
2	1	(United Kingdom) Graham Hill	BRM	32	+ 44.1	1	6
3	9	(United States) Phil Hill	Ferrari	32	+ 2:06.5	4	4
4	12	(Mexico) Ricardo Rodríguez	Ferrari	32	+ 2:06.6	7	3
5	5	(United Kingdom) John Surtees	Lola-Climax	31	+ 1 Lap	11	2
6	15	(Australia) Jack Brabham	Lotus-Climax	30	+ 2 Laps	15	1
7	7	(Netherlands) Carel Godin de Beaufort	Porsche	30	+ 2 Laps	13	
8	18	(France) Maurice Trintignant	Lotus-Climax	30	+ 2 Laps	16	
9	19	(Belgium) Lucien Bianchi	Lotus-Climax	29	+ 3 Laps	18	
10	22	(Switzerland) Jo Siffert	Lotus-Climax	29	+ 3 Laps	17	
11	4	(United Kingdom) John Campbell-Jones	Lotus-Climax	16	+ 16 Laps	19	
Ret	17	(United Kingdom) Trevor Taylor	Lotus-Climax	25	Accident	3	
Ret	10	(Belgium) Willy Mairesse	Ferrari	25	Accident	6	
Ret	2	(United States) Richie Ginther	BRM	22	Gearbox	9	
Ret	26	(South Africa) Tony Maggs	Cooper-Climax	22	Gearbox	10	
Ret	25	(New Zealand) Bruce McLaren	Cooper-Climax	19	Wheel bearing	2	
Ret	21	(United States) Masten Gregory	Lotus-BRM	13	Withdrew	8	
Ret	20	(United Kingdom) Innes Ireland	Lotus-Climax	8	Suspension	5	
Ret	11	(Italy) Giancarlo Baghetti	Ferrari	3	Ignition	14	
DNS	23	(United States) Dan Gurney	Lotus-BRM		Car unraceworthy		
WD	3	(United Kingdom) Tony Marsh	BRM		Car not ready		
WD	4	(United Kingdom) Jackie Lewis	BRM				
WD	4	(United Kingdom) Gerry Ashmore	BRM				
WD	6	(United Kingdom) Roy Salvadori	Lola-Climax				
WD	8	(Switzerland) Heinz Schiller	Porsche				
WD	24	(Sweden) Jo Bonnier	Porsche				

- Dan Gurney practiced in a Lotus-BRM owned by Wolfgang Seidel, but after a few laps he deemed the car unraceworthy. Gurney was also entered by the works Porsche team, along with Jo Bonnier, but the team withdrew after the factory was hit by strike action.
- The #4 entry was originally allocated to Lewis, then to Ashmore on Lewis' withdrawal. After Ashmore also withdrew, the slot was filled by John Campbell-Jones.
- Lucien Bianchi was originally entered as #14, in a Porsche prepared by Scuderia SSS Republica di Venezia, but withdrew. He later took #19 and drove Equipe National Belge's Lotus.

== Championship standings after the race ==
Drivers' Championship standings

	Pos	Driver	Points
	1	(United Kingdom) Graham Hill	16
	2	(United States) Phil Hill	14
11	3	(United Kingdom) Jim Clark	9
1	4	(New Zealand) Bruce McLaren	9
1	5	(United Kingdom) Trevor Taylor	6

Constructors' Championship standings

	Pos	Constructor	Points
1	1	(United Kingdom) BRM	16
2	2	(United Kingdom) Lotus-Climax	15
	3	(Italy) Ferrari	14
3	4	(United Kingdom) Cooper-Climax	11
	5	(United Kingdom) Lola-Climax	5

- Notes: Only the top five positions are included for both sets of standings.

Previous race: 1962 Monaco Grand Prix	FIA Formula One World Championship; 1962 season	Next race: 1962 French Grand Prix
Previous race: 1961 Belgian Grand Prix	Belgian Grand Prix	Next race: 1963 Belgian Grand Prix
