= Doug Serrurier =

South African racing driver (1920–2006)

- Born: 9 December 1920; Germiston, South Africa
- Died: 4 June 2006 (aged 85)

Formula One World Championship career
- Nationality: (South Africa) South African
- Active years: 1962–1963, 1965
- Team: LDS
- Entries: 3 (2 starts)
- Championships: 0
- Wins: 0
- Podiums: 0
- Career points: 0
- Pole positions: 0
- Fastest laps: 0
- First entry: 1962 South African Grand Prix
- Last entry: 1965 South African Grand Prix

Louis Douglas Serrurier (9 December 1920 – 4 June 2006) was a racing driver and racing car constructor from South Africa. He participated in three Formula One World Championship Grands Prix in the 1960s, only racing in the South African Grand Prix event, debuting on 29 December 1962. He scored no championship points.

== Racing car constructor ==
Serrurier built a series of racing cars under the name of LDS, after his initials. The first was based on a Cooper, and later cars were based on Brabhams. The cars were raced mainly by Serrurier himself, and Sam Tingle. From the Cobra Club South Africa: "Louis Douglas Serrurier built about 20 LDS Cobras during the course of his race car building history. They were all once offs, with different engine, chassis, suspension and brakes depending on the year they were built".

A handful of other custom built bodies found their home on LDS chassis in the 70s. Mainly laid up from fibreglass, but also aluminium Coupe and Convertibles.

== Racing record ==
=== Complete Formula One World Championship results ===
(key)

Year	Entrant	Chassis	Engine	1	2	3	4	5	6	7	8	9	10	WDC	Pts
1962	Otelle Nucci	LDS Mk1	Alfa Romeo Giulietta 1.5 L4	NED	MON	BEL	FRA	GBR	GER	ITA	USA	RSA; Ret		NC	0
1963	Otelle Nucci	LDS Mk1	Alfa Romeo Giulietta 1.5 L4	MON	BEL	NED	FRA	GBR	GER	ITA	USA	MEX	RSA; 11	NC	0
1965	Otelle Nucci	LDS Mk2	Climax FPF 1.5 L4	RSA; DNQ	MON	BEL	FRA	GBR	NED	GER	ITA	USA	MEX	NC	0

=== Non-Championship Formula One results ===
(key)

Year	Entrant	Chassis	Engine	1	2	3	4	5	6	7	8	9	10	11	12	13	14	15	16	17	18	19	20	21
1961	Scuderia Lupini	Cooper T51	Maserati 6-1500 1.5 L4	LOM	GLV	PAU	BRX	VIE	AIN	SYR	NAP	LON	SIL	SOL	KAN	DAN	MOD	FLG	OUL	LEW	VAL	RAN; 10	NAT; 6	RSA; 7
1962	Scuderia Lupini	Cooper T51	Maserati 6-1500 1.5 L4	CAP; DNA	BRX	LOM	LAV	GLV	PAU	AIN	INT	NAP	MAL	CLP	RMS	SOL	KAN	MED	DAN	OUL	MEX			
1962	Otelle Nucci	LDS Mk1	Alfa Romeo Giulietta 1.5 L4																			RAN; 6	NAT; 10	
1963	Otelle Nucci	LDS Mk1	Alfa Romeo Giulietta 1.5 L4	LOM	GLV	PAU	IMO	SYR	AIN	INT	ROM	SOL	KAN	MED	AUT	OUL	RAN; 8							
1964	Doug Serrurier	LDS Mk2	Climax FPF 1.5 L4	DMT	NWT	SYR	AIN	INT	SOL	MED	RAN; 6													
1965	Doug Serrurier	LDS Mk3	Climax FPF 2.0 L4	ROC	SYR	SMT	INT	MED	RAN; 8															
1966	Doug Serrurier	LDS Mk3	Climax FPF 2.0 L4	RSA; 10	SYR	INT	OUL																	
