= Trevor Blokdyk =

South African racing driver (1935–1995)

- Born: 30 November 1935; Krugersdorp, Transvaal, South Africa
- Died: 19 March 1995 (aged 59); Hekpoort, near Krugersdorp, South Africa

Formula One World Championship career
- Nationality: (South Africa) South African
- Active years: 1963, 1965
- Team: non-works Cooper
- Entries: 2 (1 start)
- First entry: 1963 South African Grand Prix
- Last entry: 1965 South African Grand Prix

Speedway career
Career history
- 1958–1959: Poole Pirates
- 1961–1962: Ipswich Witches
- 1962: Leicester Hunters

John Trevor Blokdyk (30 November 1935 – 19 March 1995) was a South African motorcycle speedway rider and Formula One driver who participated in two World Championship Grands Prix, although qualifying for only one. He earned six caps for the South Africa national speedway team.

== Career ==
Blokdyk rode in speedway in Britain in the late 1950s and early 1960s for Poole Pirates and Ipswich Witches. In 1962, he signed for Leicester Hunters but after one match for the team announced that he was quitting speedway to concentrate on motor racing.

Blokdyk competed in Formula One for the first time in the non-Championship Rand Grand Prix at Kyalami in 1961, in a Cooper, but spun out early on. He was more successful at his next race, the Natal Grand Prix at Westmead, where he finished eighth.

Coventry Bees attempted to sign Blokdyk from Ipswich Witches in June 1962 but failed to contact him to seal the transfer.

In late 1962, Blokdyk went to Europe to pursue a career in Formula Junior and was soon a front-runner, until he ran short of finances and returned to South Africa. In 1963, he started his only World Championship race at East London, driving a three-year-old Cooper-Maserati prepared by Scuderia Lupini, and coming in 12th. He also finished third in the Mozambique Grand Prix in 1963 and 1964.

Blokdyk continued in the South African Formula One Championship in 1964 and then moved back to Europe and drove in Formula 3, scoring some good results, including a win at Magny-Cours and Nogaro. He returned to South Africa for the 1964 Rand Grand Prix, where he retired his Cooper-Alfa Romeo with engine problems, and he failed to qualify for the 1965 South African Grand Prix.

Later in 1965, Blokdyk continued in European Formula 3, and suffered serious pelvic and leg injuries in a crash at Albi which ended his season. On his return in 1966, he finished sixth at Rouen-Les-Essarts, and continued to race in Europe in F3 until 1969, before returning permanently to compete in South Africa. On his retirement he became a farmer, but died following a heart attack aged 59.

== Complete Formula One World Championship results ==
(key)

| Year | Entrant | Chassis | Engine | 1 | 2 | 3 | 4 | 5 | 6 | 7 | 8 | 9 | 10 | WDC | Points |
|---|---|---|---|---|---|---|---|---|---|---|---|---|---|---|---|
| 1963 | Scuderia Lupini | Cooper T51 | Maserati Straight-4 | MON | BEL | NED | FRA | GBR | GER | ITA | USA | MEX | RSA; 12 | NC | 0 |
| 1965 | Trevor Blokdyk | Cooper T59 | Ford Straight-4 | RSA; DNQ | MON | BEL | FRA | GBR | NED | GER | ITA | USA | MEX | NC | 0 |

=== Complete Formula One non-championship results ===
(key) (Races in bold indicate pole position) (Races in italics indicate fastest lap)

| Year | Entrant | Chassis | Engine | 1 | 2 | 3 | 4 | 5 | 6 | 7 | 8 | 9 | 10 | 11 | 12 | 13 | 14 | 15 | 16 | 17 | 18 | 19 | 20 | 21 |
|---|---|---|---|---|---|---|---|---|---|---|---|---|---|---|---|---|---|---|---|---|---|---|---|---|
| 1961 | Trevor Blokdyk | Cooper T52 | Ford | LOM | GLV | PAU | BRX | VIE | AIN | SYR | NAP | LON | SIL | SOL | KAN | DAN | MOD | FLG | OUL | LEW | VAL | RAN; Ret | NAT; 8 | RSA |
| 1962 | Hoffman Racing Team | Cooper T59 | Alfa Romeo | CAP | BRX | LOM | LAV | GLV | PAU | AIN | INT | NAP | MAL | CLP | RMS | SOL | KAN | MED | DAN | OUL | MEX | RAN; DNQ | NAT; Ret | |
| 1963 | Scuderia Lupini | Cooper T51 | Maserati | LOM | GLV | PAU | IMO | SYR | AIN | INT | ROM | SOL | KAN | MED | AUT | OUL | RAN; Ret | | | | | | | |
| 1964 | Hoffman Racing | Cooper T59 | Alfa Romeo | DMT | NWT | SYR | AIN | INT | SOL | MED | RAN; Ret | | | | | | | | | | | | | |
| 1965 | Hoffman Racing | Cooper T59 | Ford | CAP; NC | ROC | SYR | SMT | INT | MED | RAN | | | | | | | | | | | | | | |
