= Peter de Klerk =

South African racing driver (1935–2015)

- Born: 16 March 1935; Pilgrim's Rest, Transvaal
- Died: 11 July 2015 (aged 80); Johannesburg, South Africa

Formula One World Championship career
- Nationality: (South Africa) South African
- Active years: 1963, 1965, 1969–1970
- Team(s): Alfa Special and non-works Brabham
- Entries: 4
- Championships: 0
- Wins: 0
- Podiums: 0
- Career points: 0
- Pole positions: 0
- Fastest laps: 0
- First entry: 1963 South African Grand Prix
- Last entry: 1970 South African Grand Prix

Peter David de Klerk (16 March 1935 – 11 July 2015) was a racing driver from South Africa. He participated in four Formula One World Championship Grands Prix, debuting on 28 December 1963. He scored no championship points.

== Alfa Special ==
Alfa Special
- Category: Formula One
- Designer: Peter de Klerk
- Predecessor: Alfa Romeo 158/159 Alfetta
- Successor: Brabham BT20 (Peter de Klerk); Alfa Romeo 177 (Alfa Romeo)

Technical specifications
- Length: 3,575 millimetres (140.7 in)
- Width: 1,600 millimetres (63 in)
- Height: 700 millimetres (28 in)
- Axle track: 1,350 millimetres (53 in) (Front); 1,365 millimetres (53.7 in) (Rear)
- Wheelbase: 2,300 millimetres (91 in)
- Engine: Alfa Romeo Giulietta 1,489 cubic centimetres (90.9 cu in; 1.489 L) Inline 4
- Transmission: 5-speed Manual
- Power: 205 metric horsepower (202 hp; 151 kW) @ 8,700 rpm 165 newton-metres (122 lbf⋅ft) @ 6,000 rpm
- Weight: 426 kilograms (939 lb)

Competition history
Entries	Races	Wins	Podiums	Poles
9	8	0	1	0

In 1962, De Klerk created a custom-made, single-seater racing special built for the South African Formula One Championship, powered by an Alfa Romeo Giulietta 1.5-litre straight-4 engine, which was christened as the "Alfa Special". The Special participated in two World Championship Grands Prix, retiring at the 1963 South African Grand Prix and finishing 10th at the 1965 South African Grand Prix. It also entered five non-championship Grands Prix, scoring a podium finish at the 1963 Rand Grand Prix.

== Complete Formula One World Championship results ==
(key) (Races in bold indicate pole position)

Year	Entrant	Chassis	Engine	1	2	3	4	5	6	7	8	9	10	11	12	13	WDC	Points
1963	Otello Nucci	Alfa Special	Alfa Romeo Giulietta 1.5 L4	MON	BEL	NED	FRA	GBR	GER	ITA	USA	MEX	RSA; Ret				NC	0
1965	Otello Nucci	Alfa Special	Alfa Romeo Giulietta 1.5 L4	RSA; 10	MON	BEL	FRA	GBR	NED	GER	ITA	USA	MEX				NC	0
1969	Jack Holme	Brabham BT20	Repco-Brabham RB620 3.0 V8	RSA; NC	ESP	MON	NED	FRA	GBR	GER	ITA	CAN	USA	MEX			NC	0
1970	Team Gunston	Brabham BT26	Ford Cosworth DFV 3.0 V8	RSA; 11	ESP	MON	BEL	NED	FRA	GBR	GER	AUT	ITA	CAN	USA	MEX	NC	0

== Complete Formula One non-championship results ==
(key) (Races in bold indicate pole position) (Races in italics indicate fastest lap)

Year	Entrant	Chassis	Engine	1	2	3	4	5	6	7	8	9	10	11	12	13	14	15	16	17	18	19	20
1962	Otello Nucci	Alfa Special	Alfa Romeo Giulietta 1.5 L4	CAP	BRX	LOM	LAV	GLV	PAU	AIN	INT	NAP	MAL	CLP	RMS	SOL	KAN	MED	DAN	OUL	MEX	RAN; 7	NAT; 7
1963	Otello Nucci	Alfa Special	Alfa Romeo Giulietta 1.5 L4	LOM	GLV	PAU	IMO	SYR	AIN	INT	ROM	SOL	KAN	MED	AUT	OUL	RAN; 3						
1964	Otello Nucci	Alfa Special	Alfa Romeo Giulietta 1.5 L4	DMT	NWT	SYR	AIN	INT	SOL	MED	RAN; 15												
1965	Otello Nucci	Alfa Special	Alfa Romeo Giulietta 1.5 L4	CAP; 4	ROC	SYR	SMT	INT	MED														
1965	Otello Nucci	Brabham BT11	Climax FPF 2.8 L4							RAN; 2													
1966	Otello Nucci	Brabham BT11	Climax FPF 2.8 L4	RSA; Ret	SYR	INT	OUL																
