= Sam Tingle =

Rhodesian racing driver (1921–2008)

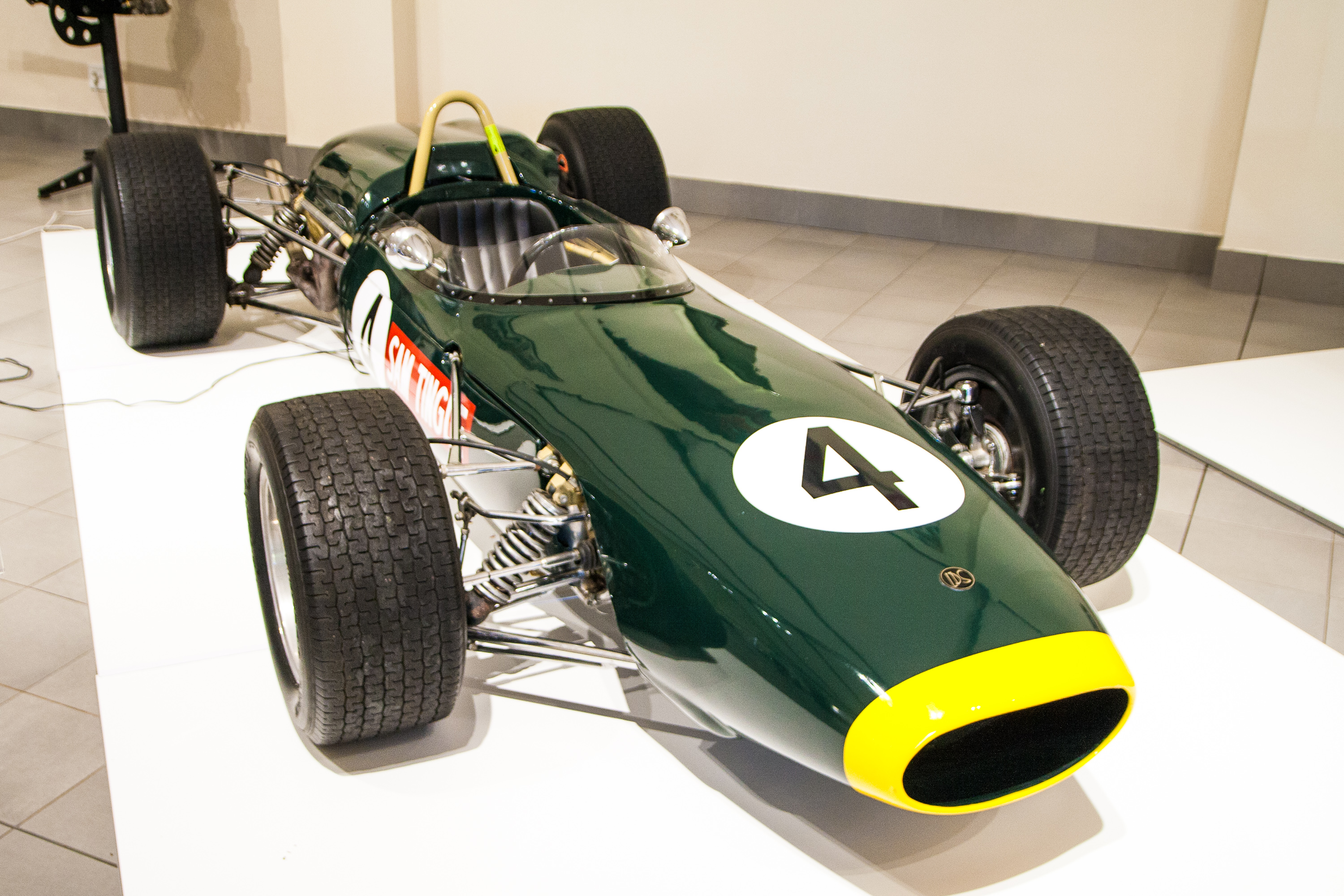
- LDS F1 car driven by Tingle in 1965
- Born: 24 August 1921; Manchester, England, UK
- Died: 19 December 2008 (aged 87); Somerset West, South Africa

Formula One World Championship career
- Nationality: Federation of Rhodesia and Nyasaland (1963); Rhodesian (1964) (1965, 1967–1968); Rhodesian (1969)
- Active years: 1963, 1965, 1967–1969
- Team(s): LDS, non-works Brabham
- Entries: 5
- Championships: 0
- Wins: 0
- Podiums: 0
- Career points: 0
- Pole positions: 0
- Fastest laps: 0
- First entry: 1963 South African Grand Prix
- Last entry: 1969 South African Grand Prix

Sam Ashworth Tingle (24 August 1921 – 19 December 2008) was an English-born racing driver from Rhodesia, now Zimbabwe.

Tingle was born in Manchester, United Kingdom, and made his Formula One debut on 28 December 1963.

Tingle was one of only two drivers from Rhodesia to successfully enter a Formula One race, the other being John Love. A third Rhodesian racer, Clive Puzey, failed to qualify in his Formula One attempt. He died in Somerset West, South Africa, aged 87.

He won the National Rhodesian Championship five times from 1959 to 1964 and the Border Trophy in 1966.

== Complete Formula One World Championship results ==
(key)

| Year | Entrant | Chassis | Engine | 1 | 2 | 3 | 4 | 5 | 6 | 7 | 8 | 9 | 10 | 11 | 12 | WDC | Points |
|---|---|---|---|---|---|---|---|---|---|---|---|---|---|---|---|---|---|
| 1963 | Sam Tingle | LDS Mk1 | Alfa Romeo Giulietta 1.5 L4 | MON | BEL | NED | FRA | GBR | GER | ITA | USA | MEX | RSA; Ret | | | NC | 0 |
| 1965 | Sam Tingle | LDS Mk2 | Alfa Romeo Giulietta 1.5 L4 | RSA; 13 | MON | BEL | FRA | GBR | NED | GER | ITA | USA | MEX | | | NC | 0 |
| 1967 | Sam Tingle | LDS Mk3 | Climax FPF 2.7 L4 | RSA; Ret | MON | NED | BEL | FRA | GBR | GER | CAN | ITA | USA | MEX | | NC | 0 |
| 1968 | Team Gunston | LDS Mk3 | Repco 620 3.0 V8 | RSA; Ret | ESP | MON | BEL | NED | FRA | GBR | GER | ITA | CAN | USA | MEX | NC | 0 |
| 1969 | Team Gunston | Brabham BT24 | Repco 620 3.0 V8 | RSA; 8 | ESP | MON | NED | FRA | GBR | GER | ITA | CAN | USA | MEX | | NC | 0 |

== Complete Formula One non-championship results ==
(key)

| Year | Entrant | Chassis | Engine | 1 | 2 | 3 | 4 | 5 | 6 | 7 | 8 | 9 | 10 | 11 | 12 | 13 | 14 | 15 | 16 | 17 | 18 | 19 | 20 | 21 |
|---|---|---|---|---|---|---|---|---|---|---|---|---|---|---|---|---|---|---|---|---|---|---|---|---|
| 1961 | Sam Tingle | LDS Mk1 | Alfa Romeo Giulietta 1.5 L4 | LOM | GLV | PAU | BRX | VIE | AIN | SYR | NAP | LON | SIL | SOL | KAN | DAN | MOD | FLG | OUL | LEW | VAL | RAN; Ret | NAT; Ret | RSA; 8 |
| 1962 | Sam Tingle | LDS Mk1 | Alfa Romeo Giulietta 1.5 L4 | CAP; Ret | BRX | LOM | LAV | GLV | PAU | AIN | INT | NAP | MAL | CLP | RMS | SOL | KAN | MED | DAN | OUL | MEX | RAN; 8 | NAT; 8 | |
| 1963 | Sam Tingle | LDS Mk1 | Alfa Romeo Giulietta 1.5 L4 | LOM | GLV | PAU | IMO | SYR | AIN | INT | ROM | SOL | KAN | MED | AUT | OUL | RAN; Ret | | | | | | | |
| 1964 | Sam Tingle | LDS Mk2 | Alfa Romeo Giulietta 1.5 L4 | DMT | NWT | SYR | AIN | INT | SOL | MED | RAN; 4 | | | | | | | | | | | | | |
| 1965 | Sam Tingle | LDS Mk2 | Alfa Romeo Giulietta 1.5 L4 | CAP; 5 | ROC | SYR | SMT | INT | MED | | | | | | | | | | | | | | | |
| 1965 | Sam Tingle | LDS Mk3 | Climax FPF 2.7 L4 | | | | | | | RAN; 7 | | | | | | | | | | | | | | |
| 1966 | Sam Tingle | LDS Mk3 | Climax FPF 2.7 L4 | RSA; 5 | SYR | INT | OUL | | | | | | | | | | | | | | | | | |
