= Formula One drivers from Rhodesia =

List of Formula One drivers who competed as Rhodesian

- Drivers: 6
- Grands Prix: 10
- Entries: 19
- Starts: 15
- Best season finish: 11th (1967)
- Wins: 0
- Podiums: 1
- Pole positions: 0
- Fastest laps: 0
- Points: 6
- First entry: 1962 South African Grand Prix
- Latest entry: 1972 South African Grand Prix

There were 6 Formula One drivers from Rhodesia (both Northern Rhodesia and Southern Rhodesia, which from 1953 to 1963 existed as one country, Federation of Rhodesia and Nyasaland, before breaking down into individual countries again), with 3 of them having started in races.

== Former drivers ==
Six Formula One drivers have raced under a Rhodesian racing license, including:

- John Love, born in South Rhodesia, is the most successful Rhodesian driver. He had 10 separate entries and 9 starts, spanning across 10 seasons. During the 1967 South African Grand Prix, Love finished in second, marking the only podium and points finish for any Rhodesian driver.
- Sam Tingle was an English driver who competed under a Rhodesian license. He had a total of 5 starts over a span of 5 seasons. Of these five races, he had three retirements. His highest finishing position was 8th during the 1969 South African Grand Prix.
- Mike Harris was a driver from North Rhodesia. He started in the 1962 South African Grand Prix, but retired from the race on lap 31.
- Gary Hocking was a Welsh driver who grew up in South Rhodesia. He was entered into the 1962 South African Grand Prix, but never started the race due to a fatal accident while practicing for the 1962 Natal Grand Prix.
- Clive Puzey and Ray Reed were both South Rhodesian drivers who were entered into the 1965 South African Grand Prix, but did not start the race.

== Timeline ==
Drivers	Active Years	Entries	Wins	Podiums	Career Points	Poles	Fastest Laps
John Love	1962–1965, 1967–1972	10 (9 starts)	0	1	6	0	0
Mike Harris	1962	1	0	0	0	0	0
Gary Hocking	1962	1 (0 starts)	0	0	0	0	0
Sam Tingle	1963, 1965, 1967–1969	5	0	0	0	0	0
Clive Puzey	1965	1 (0 starts)	0	0	0	0	0
Ray Reed	1965	1 (0 starts)	0	0	0	0	0
