= David Clapham =

South African racing driver and motor sport journalist

Dave Clapham
- Born: 17 May 1931; Rawmarsh, Yorkshire, England, UK
- Died: 22 October 2005 (aged 74); Sunninghill, Gauteng, South Africa

Formula One World Championship career
- Nationality: (South Africa) South African
- Active years: 1965
- Team: privateer Cooper
- Entries: 1 (0 starts)
- Championships: 0
- Wins: 0
- Podiums: 0
- Career points: 0
- Pole positions: 0
- Fastest laps: 0
- First entry: 1965 South African Grand Prix

David Philip Clapham (17 May 1931 – 22 October 2005) was a racing driver and motor sport journalist from South Africa.

== Career ==
Clapham participated at many levels of motor sport in South Africa, including Formula Vee, Formula Ford and saloon car racing, as well as the South African Formula One Championship. He was instrumental in bringing Formula Vee and Formula Ford to South Africa, and helped Jody Scheckter move to Europe where he got his big break into international motorsport.

He took part in the Formula One Rand Grand Prix in 1963 and 1964, blowing the engine of his Cooper in the latter. He had entered the 1965 South African Grand Prix two weeks later, but he withdrew the entry before the meeting took place.

Clapham also wrote articles and columns in the South African motor sport press, both during and after his racing career, and later remained in the sport in various administrative capacities. He died in 2005 after a short illness, leaving behind his wife Margaret, son Jeremy and daughter Bridget.

== Results ==
=== Complete Formula One World Championship results ===
(key)

Yr	Entrant	Chassis	Engine	1	2	3	4	5	6	7	8	9	10	WDC	Points
1965	Lawson Organisation	Cooper T51	Maserati Straight-4	RSA; WD	MON	BEL	FRA	GBR	NED	GER	ITA	USA	MEX	NC	0

=== Non-Championship Formula One results ===
(key)

Year	Entrant	Chassis	Engine	1	2	3	4	5	6	7	8	9	10	11	12	13	14
1963	Scuderia Los Amigos	LDS	Climax Straight-4	LOM	GLV	PAU	IMO	SYR	AIN	INT	ROM	SOL	KAN	MED	AUT	OUL	RAN; 17
1964	Lawson Organisation	Cooper T51	Maserati Straight-4	DMT	NWT	SYR	AIN	INT	SOL	MED	RAN; Ret						
