= Clive Puzey =

Rhodesian racing driver (born 1941)

- Born: 11 July 1941 (age 85); Bulawayo, Southern Rhodesia

Formula One World Championship career
- Nationality: Rhodesian
- Active years: 1965
- Team: non-works Lotus
- Entries: 1 (0 starts)
- Championships: 0
- Wins: 0
- Podiums: 0
- Career points: 0
- Pole positions: 0
- Fastest laps: 0
- First entry: 1965 South African Grand Prix

Clive Puzey (born 11 July 1941) is a Rhodesian former racing driver. He began taking part in the South African Formula One Championship in 1963 with a Lotus 18/21, finishing seventh in the Rand Grand Prix the following year. He was born in Bulawayo.

Puzey's only Formula One World Championship Grand Prix attempt came when he entered the 1965 South African Grand Prix with his Lotus-Climax, but he failed to pre-qualify. He was one of only six drivers from Rhodesia (divided in modern-day Zambia and Zimbabwe) to enter a World Championship Formula One race.

He continued to race in the South African Formula One Championship until 1969, winning the Rand Autumn Trophy in 1964 and scoring three podiums in 1966. After his racing career ended, Puzey ran a garage in his home town of Bulawayo until 2000. Being an outspoken critic of Robert Mugabe's government, he was repeatedly threatened until he left the country and moved to Australia.

== Complete Formula One World Championship results ==
(key)

Yr	Entrant	Chassis	Engine	1	2	3	4	5	6	7	8	9	10	WDC	Points
1965	Clive Puzey Motors	Lotus 18	Climax Straight-4	RSA; DNPQ	MON	BEL	FRA	GBR	NED	GER	ITA	USA	MEX	NC	0

=== Non-championship Formula One results ===
(key)

Yr	Entrant	Chassis	Engine	1	2	3	4	5	6	7	8	9	10	11	12	13	14
1963	Clive Puzey	Lotus 18	Climax Straight-4	LOM	GLV	PAU	IMO	SYR	AIN	INT	ROM	SOL	KAN	MED	AUT	OUL	RAN; Ret
1964	Clive Puzey Motors	Lotus 18	Climax Straight-4	DMT	NWT	SYR	AIN	INT	SOL	MED	RAN; 7						
1965	Clive Puzey Motors	Lotus 18	Climax Straight-4	ROC	SYR	SMT	INT	MED	RAN; 9								
1966	Clive Puzey Motors	Lotus 18	Climax Straight-4	RSA; 7	SYR	INT	OUL										

== Notes and references ==
- "The Formula One Record Book" - John Thompson, 1974.
- www.forix.com
