= Bob Anderson (racing driver) =

British motorcycle racer and racing driver (1931–1967)

- Anderson in Imola,1963
- Born: 19 May 1931; Hendon, London, UK
- Died: 14 August 1967 (aged 36); Northampton, UK
Motorcycle racing career statistics
Grand Prix motorcycle racing
Active years	1958–1960
First race	1958 350cc Isle of Man Junior TT
Last race	1960 350cc Nations Grand Prix
Starts / Wins / Podiums / Poles / F. laps / Points; 13 / 0 / 3 / N/A / 1 / 35
Isle of Man TT career
TTs contested	3 (1958–1960)
TT wins	0
First TT win	–
Last TT win	–
TT podiums	2
Formula One World Championship career
Nationality	(United Kingdom) British
Active years	1963–1967
Team	DW Racing Enterprises (non-works Brabham or Lola)
Entries	29 (25 starts)
Championships	0
Wins	0
Podiums	1
Career points	8
Pole positions	0
Fastest laps	0
First entry	1963 British Grand Prix
Last entry	1967 British Grand Prix

Robert Hugh Fearon Anderson (19 May 1931 – 14 August 1967) was a British Grand Prix motorcycle road racer and racing driver. He competed in Grand Prix motorcycle racing from 1958 to 1960 and in Formula One from 1963 to the 1967 seasons. He was also a two-time winner of the North West 200 race in Northern Ireland. Anderson was one of the last independent privateer drivers in Formula One before escalating costs made it impossible to compete without sponsorship.

== Racing career ==
=== Motorcycle racing ===
Anderson was born in Hendon in the north of London and later lived in Haynes, Bedfordshire. He trained as an agricultural engineer, though left after a year and got a job as a mechanic in a local machinery dealer. He began his motorcycle racing career in 1953 competing on a 500cc Triumph Special at Cadwell Park. By 1955 he was racing a Matchless G45 at circuits such as Crystal Palace and Castle Combe and placed 8th at the 1955 Senior Manx Grand Prix. Switching to a Norton in 1956, he finished second to Jimmy Buchan at the Senior Manx Grand Prix and won the 500cc North West 200.

Anderson established himself as one of the top national competitors in 1957 with victories at Cadwell Park, Crystal Palace, Snetterton, Brands Hatch and won the 350cc North West 200. He finished second to world champion John Surtees at the 1958 Senior TT race at the Isle of Man, then considered the most prestigious motorcycle race on the world championship circuit. Anderson began to compete in the Grand Prix world championships in 1958, scoring another second place result behind Geoff Duke at the 350cc Swedish Grand Prix.

=== Switch to auto racing ===
At the end of 1960, Anderson sustained a back injury while racing in South Africa, which led him to switch to auto racing at the relatively late age of 29. In 1961 he drove a Lola in a Formula Junior race at Snetterton. He continued to race cars and eventually competed as a Team Lotus driver in the Formula Junior championship, winning a race at Autodrome de Montlhéry and finishing second at Monaco.

Anderson entered Formula One in 1963 with his own Lola Mk4 car, under the guise of DW Racing Enterprises, a small team compared to other private outfits such as Scuderia Filipinetti or Rob Walker Racing Team. DW was actually only composed of Anderson and a small team of mechanics. Despite this hindrance, he took the flexible little Lola to victory in the non-Championship Rome Grand Prix in that first year. In later years he ran private Brabham cars under the same banner, with his best result a third place in the 1964 Austrian Grand Prix. He was awarded the Von Trips Memorial Trophy as the most successful private entrant of 1964.

In 1967, Anderson suffered an accident while testing at Silverstone, in which he slid off the track in wet conditions and hit a marshal's post. Anderson suffered serious chest and neck injuries and died later in Northampton General Hospital.

== Racing record ==
=== Motorcycle Grand Prix results ===
**Position**	1	2	3	4	5	6
**Points**	8	6	4	3	2	1

(key) (Races in bold indicate pole position; races in italics indicate fastest lap)

Year	Class	Team	1	2	3	4	5	6	7	8	Points	Rank	Wins
1958	350cc	Norton	IOM; 8	NED	BEL	GER; 5	SWE; 2	ULS	NAT; 4		11	5th	0
1958	500cc	Norton	IOM; 2	NED	BEL; 6	GER	SWE	ULS	NAT		7	8th	0
1959	350cc	Norton	FRA; 4	IOM; 5	GER			SWE	ULS	NAT	5	9th	0
1959	500cc	Norton	FRA	IOM; NC	GER	NED	BEL; 6		ULS	NAT	1	15th	0
1960	125cc	MZ		IOM; 5	NED	BEL		ULS	NAT		2	9th	0
1960	250cc	MZ		IOM; NC	NED	BEL	GER	ULS	NAT		0	–	0
1960	350cc	Norton	FRA	IOM; 6	NED; 3			ULS; 4	NAT; 5		9	5th	0
1960	500cc	Norton	FRA	IOM; 8	NED	BEL	GER	ULS	NAT		0	–	0

=== Complete Formula One World Championship results ===
(key)

Year	Entrant	Chassis	Engine	1	2	3	4	5	6	7	8	9	10	11	WDC	Pts
1963	DW Racing Enterprises	Lola Mk4	Climax FWMV 1.5 V8	MON	BEL	NED	FRA	GBR; 12	GER	ITA; 12	USA	MEX	RSA		NC	0
1964	DW Racing Enterprises	Brabham BT11	Climax FWMV 1.5 V8	MON; 7	NED; 6	BEL; DNS	FRA; 12	GBR; 7	GER; Ret	AUT; 3	ITA; 11	USA	MEX		11th	5
1965	DW Racing Enterprises	Brabham BT11	Climax FWMV 1.5 V8	RSA; NC	MON; 9	BEL; DNS	FRA; 9	GBR; Ret	NED; Ret	GER; DNS	ITA	USA	MEX		NC	0
1966	DW Racing Enterprises	Brabham BT11	Climax FPF 2.8 L4	MON; Ret	BEL	FRA; 7	GBR; NC	NED; Ret	GER; Ret	ITA; 6	USA	MEX			17th	1
1967	DW Racing Enterprises	Brabham BT11	Climax FPF 2.8 L4	RSA; 5	MON; DNQ	NED; 9	BEL; 8	FRA; Ret	GBR; Ret	GER	CAN	ITA	USA	MEX	16th	2

=== Non-Championship Formula One results ===
(key) (Races in bold indicate pole position) (Races in italics indicate fastest lap)

Year	Entrant	Chassis	Engine	1	2	3	4	5	6	7	8	9	10	11	12	13	14
1963	DW Racing Enterprises	Lola Mk4	Climax FWMV 1.5 V8	LOM; Ret	GLV	PAU; Ret	IMO; 3	SYR; 4	AIN	INT	ROM; 1	SOL; 8	KAN; 8	MED; 6	AUT	OUL; Ret	RAN
1964	DW Racing Enterprises	Brabham BT11	Climax FWMV 1.5 V8	DMT	NWT	SYR	AIN	INT; Ret	SOL; 3	MED	RAN; 3						
1965	DW Racing Enterprises	Brabham BT11	Climax FWMV 1.5 V8	ROC; Ret	SYR; 6	SMT; DSQ	INT; NC	MED	RAN								
1966	DW Racing Enterprises	Brabham BT11	Climax FPF 2.8 L4	RSA; DSQ	SYR; DNS	INT; 7	OUL; Ret										
1967	DW Racing Enterprises	Brabham BT11	Climax FPF 2.8 L4	ROC; Ret	SPR; 7	INT; 8	SYR	OUL	ESP								

Preceded by Lorenzo Bandini	Formula One fatal accidents 14 August 1967	Succeeded by Jo Schlesser
