= Realpha =

Formula One racing car

RE
- Full name: Realpha
- Base: Rhodesia
- Founder(s): Ray Reed
- Noted drivers: (Rhodesia) Ray Reed (Rhodesia) Peter Huson

Formula One World Championship career
- First entry: 1965 South African Grand Prix
- Races entered: 1 (0 starts)
- Engines: Alfa Romeo
- Constructors' Championships: 0
- Drivers' Championships: 0
- Race victories: 0
- Points: 0
- Pole positions: 0
- Fastest laps: 0
- Final entry: 1965 South African Grand Prix

The Realpha, also known as RE, was a Rhodesian Formula One racing car. The car was built by Ray Reed at his base in Gwelo, and was structurally based on a Cooper. Like many South African home-built Formula One cars of the time, it was fitted with an Alfa Romeo Giulietta engine.

Under the "Ray's Engineering" banner, Reed entered the car in the non-championship Rand Grand Prix Formula One event in South Africa in late 1964, but retired due to an engine failure during the first heat. He also entered the 1965 South African Grand Prix, but the entry was withdrawn before the race.

The car later appeared at the 1966 Rhodesian Grand Prix, the last round of that year's South African Drivers Championship, entered by local driver Peter Huson, but he retired from the race after an accident.

== Results ==
=== Complete Formula One World Championship results ===
Year	Chassis	Engine	Tyres	Driver	1	2	3	4	5	6	7	8	9	10	Points	WCC
1965	RE	Alfa Romeo	D		RSA	MON	BEL	FRA	GBR	NED	GER	ITA	USA	MEX	0	NC
1965	RE	Alfa Romeo	D	Ray Reed	WD										0	NC

=== Complete Formula One non-championship results ===
Year	Chassis	Engine	Tyres	Driver	1	2	3	4	5	6	7	8
1964	RE	Alfa Romeo	D		DMT	NWT	SYR	AIN	INT	SOL	MED	RAN
1964	RE	Alfa Romeo	D	Ray Reed								Ret

=== Complete South African Drivers Championship results ===
Year	Chassis	Engine	Driver	1	2	3	4	5	6	7	8	9	10	11	12	13	Points	Ch.
1966	RE	Alfa Romeo		CSE	RAT	EAS	BUL	REP	NAT	BOR	GOV	RWT	PFT	VRT	RST	RHO	0	NC
1966	RE	Alfa Romeo	Peter Huson													Ret	0	NC
