= Giorgio Bassi =

Italian racing driver (born 1934)

- Born: 20 January 1934 (age 92); Milan, Kingdom of Italy

Formula One World Championship career
- Nationality: (Italy) Italian
- Active years: 1965
- Team: Scuderia Centro Sud
- Entries: 1
- Championships: 0
- Wins: 0
- Podiums: 0
- Career points: 0
- Pole positions: 0
- Fastest laps: 0
- First entry: 1965 Italian Grand Prix

Giorgio Bassi (born 20 January 1934 in Milan) is a former Formula One driver from Italy who raced in the 1965 Italian Grand Prix for the Scuderia Centro Sud team. He was also a regular participant in Italian Formula 3 and took a class win in the 1965 Targa Florio in a 1-litre ASA Prototype.

== Complete Formula One results ==
(key)

Year	Entrant	Chassis	Engine	1	2	3	4	5	6	7	8	9	10	WDC	Points
1965	Scuderia Centro Sud	BRM P57	BRM V8	RSA	MON	BEL	FRA	GBR	NED	GER	ITA; Ret	USA	MEX	NC	0
