= Ray Reed (racing driver) =

- Born: 30 April 1932; Gwelo, Southern Rhodesia
- Died: 8 May 1970 (aged 38); South Africa

Formula One World Championship career
- Nationality: (Rhodesia) Rhodesian
- Active years: 1965
- Team: RE
- Entries: 1 (0 starts)
- Championships: 0
- Wins: 0
- Podiums: 0
- Career points: 0
- Pole positions: 0
- Fastest laps: 0
- First entry: 1965 South African Grand Prix

Raymond William Reed (30 April 1932 – 8 May 1970) was a Rhodesian racing driver born in Gwelo, Southern Rhodesia. He was entered in the 1965 South African Grand Prix in his self-built RE-Alfa Romeo, but did not take part and had earlier participated in the non-championship 1964 Rand Grand Prix. Reed was killed along with his three children in an aircraft accident on 8 May 1970 near Nottingham Road, Natal in South Africa. He had been deemed to be flying in weather conditions under which he was not qualified or legally permitted to fly.

== Racing record ==
=== Complete Formula One World Championship results ===
(key)

Yr	Entrant	Chassis	Engine	1	2	3	4	5	6	7	8	9	10	WDC	Points
1965	Ray's Engineering	RE	Alfa Romeo Straight-4	RSA; WD	MON	BEL	FRA	GBR	NED	GER	ITA	USA	MEX	NC	0

=== Non-championship Formula One results ===
(key)

Year	Entrant	Chassis	Engine	1	2	3	4	5	6	7	8
1964	Ray's Engineering	RE	Alfa Romeo Straight-4	DMT	NWT	SYR	AIN	INT	SOL	MED	RAN; Ret
