= 1964 Rand Grand Prix =

- Non-championship race in the 1964 Formula One season
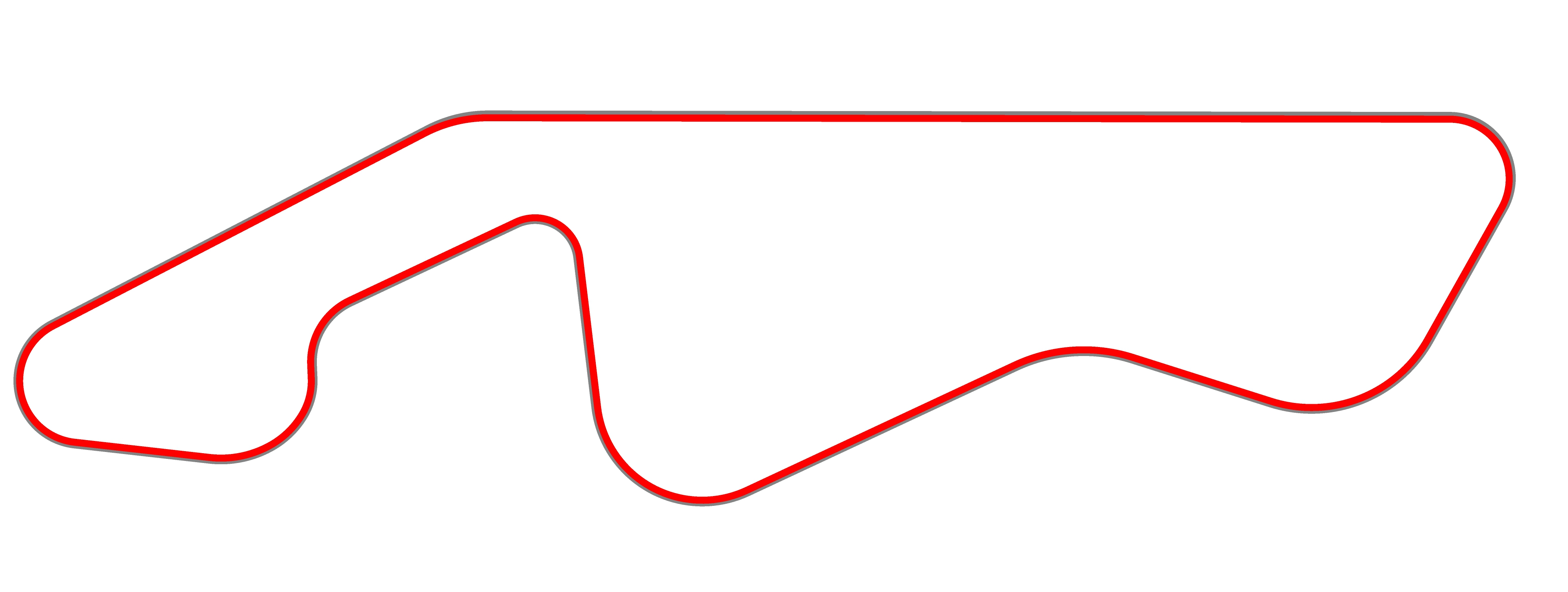

Race details
- Date: 12 December 1964
- Official name: VII Rand Grand Prix
- Location: Kyalami, Johannesburg
- Course: Permanent racing facility
- Course length: 4.096 km (2.545 miles)
- Distance: 25 x 2 laps, 204.8 km (127.25 miles)

Pole position
Driver	(United Kingdom) Jackie Stewart	Lotus-Climax
- Time: 1:35.0

Fastest lap
Drivers	(United Kingdom) Mike Spence (Heat 1)	Lotus-Climax
	(United Kingdom) Jackie Stewart (Heat 2)	Lotus-Climax
- Time: 1:38.6 (Heat 1) / 1:36.0 (Heat 2)

Podium
First	(United Kingdom) Graham Hill	Brabham-BRM
Second	(Australia) Paul Hawkins	Brabham-Ford
Third	(United Kingdom) Bob Anderson	Brabham-Climax

The 7th Rand Grand Prix was a motor race, run to Formula One rules, held on 12 December 1964 at Kyalami, South Africa. The race was run over two heats, each of 25 laps of the circuit, and was won overall by British driver Graham Hill in a Brabham BT11.

This race was the Formula One debut for future triple world champion Jackie Stewart, who secured pole position for the first heat. His car failed on the grid, and Hill won with Mike Spence in second. Stewart took the second heat, but Hill came second to claim the overall victory. Brabham cars filled the first three places, each with different makes of engine.

== Results ==
Pos	Driver	Entrant	Constructor	Time/Retired	Grid	Heat 1 / 2
1	(United Kingdom) Graham Hill	John Willment Automobiles	Brabham-BRM	1.22:48.7	24	1st / 2nd
2	(Australia) Paul Hawkins	John Willment Automobiles	Brabham-Ford	+ 52.9	4	3rd / 4th
3	(United Kingdom) Bob Anderson	DW Racing Enterprises	Brabham-Climax	+ 1:25.0	5	4th / 3rd
4	(Rhodesia) Sam Tingle	Sam Tingle	LDS-Alfa Romeo	+ 3:31.1	14	7th / 5th
5	(South Africa) Brausch Niemann	Ted Lanfear	Lotus-Ford	+ 3:55.8	10	9th / 6th
6	(South Africa) Doug Serrurier	Otelle Nucci	LDS-Climax	49 laps	11	8th / 7th
7	(Rhodesia) Clive Puzey	Clive Puzey Motors	Lotus-Climax	49 laps	15	10th / 9th
8	(Rhodesia) John Love	John Love	Cooper-Climax	46 laps	7	5th / 12th
9	(South Africa) Bob Hay	Bob Hay	Lotus-Ford	46 laps	19	13th / 11th
10	(South Africa) Neville Lederle	Scuderia Scribante	Lotus-Climax	45 laps	13	15th / 8th
11	(South Africa) David Hume	Team Valencia	Heron-Alfa Romeo	45 laps	16	11th / 13th
12	(South Africa) Alex Blignaut	Team Valencia	LDS-Alfa Romeo	44 laps	21	12th / 14th
13	(South Africa) Steve Mellet	Stan Mellet	LDS-Alfa Romeo	40 laps	25	16th / 15th
14	(South Africa) Rauten Hartmann	Rauten Hartmann	Netuar-Peugeot	37 laps / Engine	20	14th / Ret
15	(South Africa) Peter de Klerk	Otelle Nucci	Alfa Special-Alfa Romeo	27 laps / Accident	8	6th / Ret
16	(United Kingdom) Mike Spence	Team Lotus	Lotus-Climax	26 laps / Rose joint	2	2nd / Ret
17	(United Kingdom) Jackie Stewart	Team Lotus	Lotus-Climax	Driveshaft / 25 laps	1	Ret / 1st
18	(United Kingdom) David Prophet	David Prophet Racing	Brabham-Ford	Water in petrol / 23 laps	9	Ret / 10th
19	(Rhodesia) Ray Reed	Rays Engineering	RE-Alfa Romeo	23 laps / Engine	17	Ret / DNS
Ret	(South Africa) Trevor Blokdyk	Hoffman Racing	Cooper-Alfa Romeo	Gearbox / Engine	6	Ret / Ret
Ret	(South Africa) David Clapham	Lawson Organisation	Cooper-Maserati	Engine	18	Ret / DNS
Ret	(South Africa) Ernie Pieterse	Ernie Pieterse	Lotus-Climax	Accident	12	Ret / DNS
DNS	(South Africa) Tony Maggs	Reg Parnell Racing	Lotus-BRM	Camshaft in practice	(3)	/ -
DNS	(South Africa) Dave Charlton	Ecurie Tomahawk	Lotus-Ford	Fire in practice	(22)	/ -
DNS	(South Africa) Jackie Pretorius	Jackie Pretorius	LDS-Alfa Romeo	Withdrawn after practice	(23)	/ -
DNP	(South Africa) Lionel Wilmot	Lionel Wilmot	LDS-Alfa Romeo	Oil leak	-	/ -

Previous race: 1964 Mediterranean Grand Prix	Formula One non-championship races 1964 season	Next race: 1965 Race of Champions
Previous race: 1963 Rand Grand Prix	Rand Grand Prix	Next race: 1965 Rand Grand Prix
