= Mike Spence =

British racing driver (1936–1968)

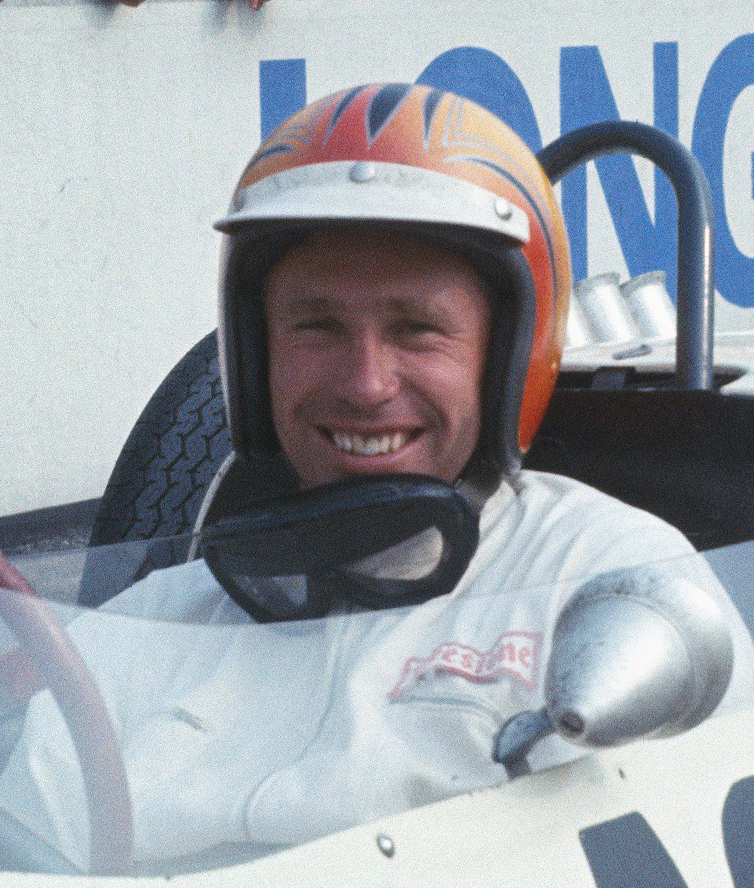
- Spence at the 1966 Italian Grand Prix
- Born: Michael Henderson Spence; 30 December 1936; Purley, Surrey, England
- Died: 7 May 1968 (aged 31); Indianapolis, Indiana, U.S.

Formula One World Championship career
- Nationality: (United Kingdom) British
- Active years: 1963–1968
- Team(s): Lotus (incl. non-works), BRM
- Entries: 37 (36 starts)
- Championships: 0
- Wins: 0
- Podiums: 1
- Career points: 27
- Pole positions: 0
- Fastest laps: 0
- First entry: 1963 Italian Grand Prix
- Last entry: 1968 South African Grand Prix

24 Hours of Le Mans career
- Years: 1967
- Teams: Chaparral Cars
- Best finish: DNF (1967)
- Class wins: 0

Michael Henderson Spence (30 December 1936 – 7 May 1968) was a British racing driver from Surrey in England. He participated in 37 Formula One World Championship Grands Prix, debuting on 8 September 1963. He achieved one podium, and scored a total of 27 championship points. He also participated in numerous non-Championship Formula One races, as well as sports car racing.

== Early career ==
Spence was born in Purley, Surrey, and began his motorsport career driving his father's Turner and an AC Ace sports car. Spence moved into open-wheel racing in Formula Junior in 1960. Spence drove the Emeryson in two non-Championship Formula One races in 1961, the Solitude Grand Prix near Stuttgart and the Lewis-Evans Trophy at Brands Hatch. He retired early from the Solitude race with a gearbox failure, but finished second behind Tony Marsh's BRM in the Lewis-Evans Trophy. These results prompted moves to the privateer Ian Walker Racing FJ team for 1962, driving a Lotus 22, and then to the works Lotus Formula Junior squad in 1963.

Despite disappointing results in his first Formula Junior season with a major team, with fourth place in the British Grand Prix FJ support race his best result, towards the end of 1963, Spence was called up to the Lotus Formula One team, taking the place of the injured Trevor Taylor at the Italian Grand Prix. Driving the Lotus 25, Spence qualified ninth and was classified 13th in the race despite the car's oil pressure fading near the end, while team-mate Jim Clark took the win and with it the Drivers' Championship.

== Formula One ==
With Lotus signing Peter Arundell as Clark's team-mate for 1964, Spence spent most of the early season driving in Formula Two events. However, shortly before the British Grand Prix, Arundell suffered a severe accident in an F2 race at Reims-Gueux, and Spence was called up to replace him in the F1 team for the rest of the season. Driving both the Lotus 25 and the Lotus 33, Spence managed points finishes in two World Championship races, sixth in Italy and fourth at the season finale in Mexico. This gave him four points, placing him equal 12th in the Drivers' Championship.

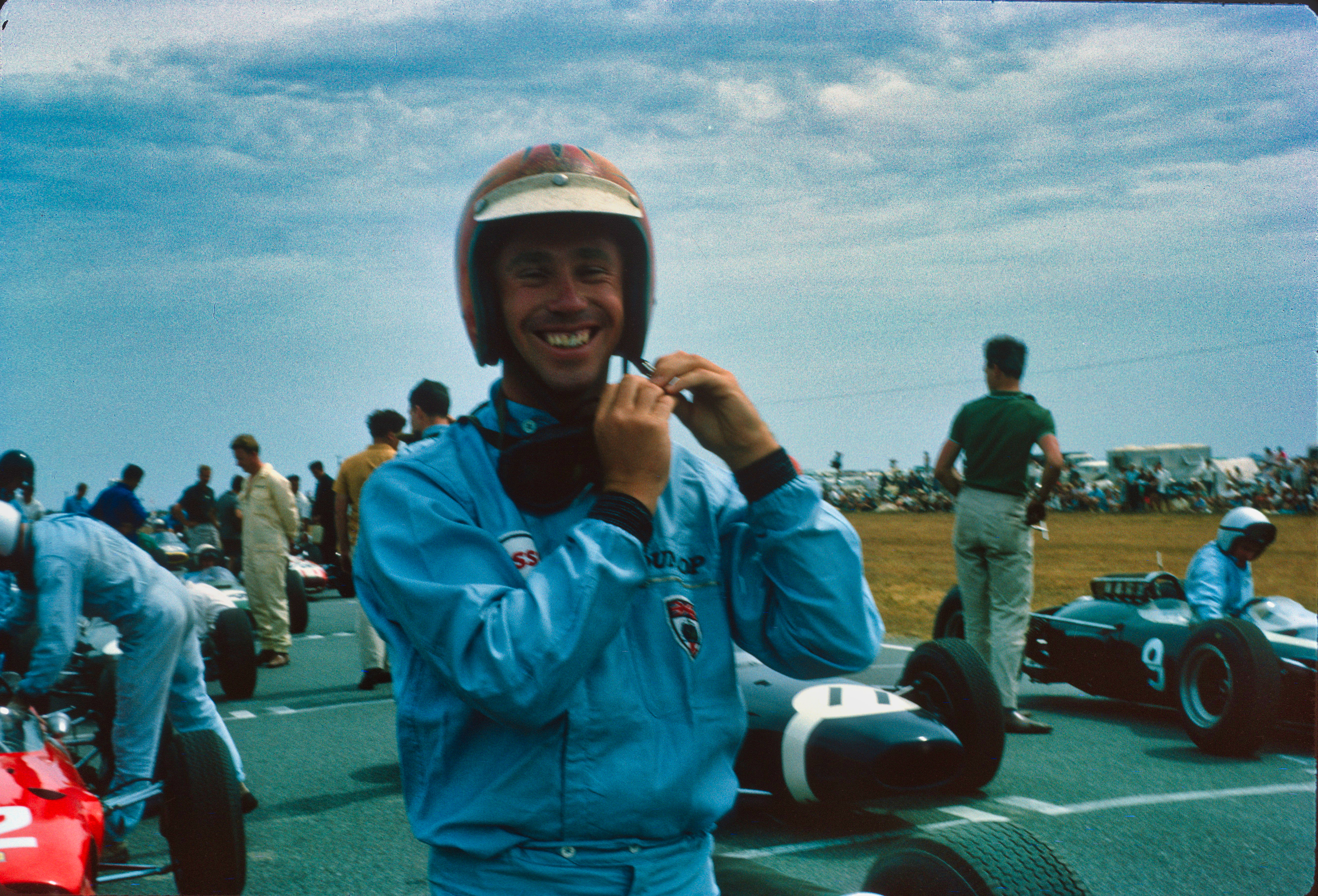
Spence at the 1965 South African Grand Prix

Staying with Lotus for 1965, Spence finished fourth in the season opener in South Africa, then won the prestigious Race of Champions at Brands Hatch and finished third in the International Trophy at Silverstone. But over the rest of the Championship, while Clark won his second Drivers' title with ease, Spence could only record two more points finishes, coming fourth again in Britain and third in the season finale in Mexico, behind American duo Richie Ginther and Dan Gurney, in what would turn out to be his only podium finish in a Championship race. With ten points, he was eighth in the Drivers' Championship.

The 1966 season began with victory in another non-Championship race, in South Africa. However, Lotus boss Colin Chapman then took back the recovered Arundell, leaving Spence out of a drive. Before the Championship began in May at Monaco, Spence signed for the privateer Reg Parnell Racing team, but the BRM-powered Lotus 25 he drove was elderly and unreliable and he finished only twice, in the Netherlands and Italy, although he was fifth on both occasions. The four points thus earned placed him 13th in the Drivers' Championship.

At the end of 1966, Graham Hill left the works BRM team to join Lotus, and Spence was chosen as his replacement. Driving the BRM P83 over the course of the 1967 Championship, Spence achieved points finishes in five races, though these consisted of four fifths and a sixth. He thus finished tenth in the Drivers' Championship with nine points. Continuing with BRM at the start of 1968, Spence drove the P115 in the season opener in South Africa and the P126 in the Race of Champions and the International Trophy; he retired from all three races but performed strongly in the latter two, hinting at a great potential for the rest of the season.

== Sports car racing ==
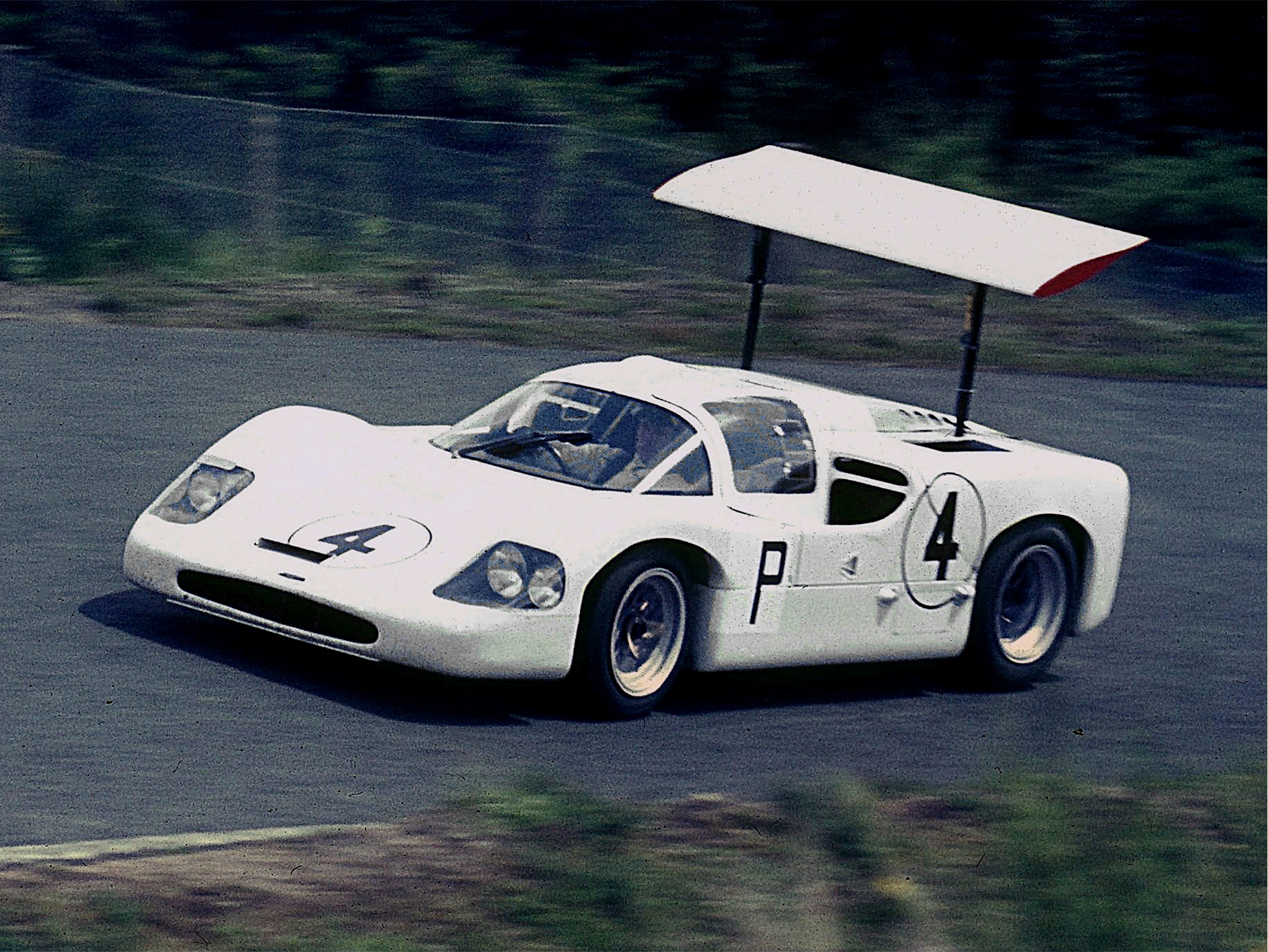
Spence driving the Chaparral 2F at the Nürburgring in 1967

In 1967, Jim Hall hired Spence as part of his Chaparral sports car team. One of the most innovative engineers in 1960s motorsport, Hall pioneered many advances in racing technology. For 1967, the great advance was the addition of aerodynamic wings to the rear of his cars, generating extra downforce to improve grip levels and hence cornering speeds. Driving the Chaparral 2F with regular partner Phil Hill, Spence managed to make a great impression on the sports car scene. Fastest laps in the 12 Hours of Sebring and 1000km Spa races were just the prelude to a dominant win in the 1967 BOAC 500 race at Brands Hatch. Spence and Hill finished half a lap ahead of the Jackie Stewart/Chris Amon Ferrari 330P, who were themselves three laps ahead of everybody else.

For 1968, Spence moved to the Ford-backed Alan Mann Racing team. He became one of the few people ever to drive the ill-fated Ford P68 in competition, although an engine mount failure on his own entry, followed by a driveshaft failure on the team's second car during the race, prevented Spence from reaching the chequered flag.

== Death ==
Following Clark's death at Hockenheim in early April 1968, Colin Chapman invited Spence back to Lotus as part of their Indianapolis 500 team, with the race in late May. Spence was due to race the revolutionary Lotus 56 gas turbine car. During practice at the Indianapolis Motor Speedway on Tuesday, 7 May, Spence, driving the No. 60 Lotus 56 turbocar (later qualified and driven by Joe Leonard), ran a lap of 169.555 mph (272.9 km/h) – fastest of the month and second-fastest in track history.

Later in the afternoon, Colin Chapman was asked by Andy Granatelli if Spence could take out turbocar No. 30 for a test run after driver Greg Weld had difficulty getting the car up to speed. Spence quickly got the car to a lap of 163 mph (262 km/h), but early in the second lap, he misjudged his entry to turn one and collided heavily with the concrete wall. The right-front wheel of the Lotus swiveled backwards into the cockpit and struck Spence on the helmet; he died in the hospital later that evening at 9:45 pm from massive head injuries. His fastest lap speed set earlier that day was unsurpassed for the next five practice days.

== Racing record ==
=== Complete Formula One World Championship results ===
(key)

Year	Entrant	Chassis	Engine	1	2	3	4	5	6	7	8	9	10	11	12	WDC	Points
1963	Team Lotus	Lotus 25	Climax V8	MON	BEL	NED	FRA	GBR	GER	ITA; 13	USA	MEX	RSA			NC	0
1964	Team Lotus	Lotus 25	Climax V8	MON	NED	BEL	FRA	GBR; 9					MEX; 4			12th	4
1964	Team Lotus	Lotus 33	Climax V8						GER; 8	AUT; Ret	ITA; 6	USA; 7^{1}				12th	4
1965	Team Lotus	Lotus 33	Climax V8	RSA; 4	MON	BEL; 7	FRA; 7	GBR; 4		GER; Ret	ITA; 11	USA; Ret	MEX; 3			8th	10
1965	Team Lotus	Lotus 25	Climax V8						NED; 8							8th	10
1966	Reg Parnell Racing Ltd	Lotus 25/33^{2}	BRM V8	MON; Ret	BEL; Ret	FRA; Ret	GBR; Ret	NED; 5	GER; Ret	ITA; 5	USA; Ret	MEX; DNS				13th	4
1967	Owen Racing Organisation	BRM P83	BRM H16	RSA; Ret	MON; 6	NED; 8	BEL; 5	FRA; Ret	GBR; Ret	GER; Ret	CAN; 5	ITA; 5	USA; Ret	MEX; 5		10th	9
1968	Owen Racing Organisation	BRM P115	BRM H16	RSA; Ret	ESP	MON	BEL	NED	FRA	GBR	GER	ITA	CAN	USA	MEX	NC	0

^{1}Shared drive with Jim Clark.
^{2}The Parnell Lotus driven by Spence in 1966 was a written-off 25 rebuilt around a 33 monocoque.

=== Non-Championship results ===
(key) (Races in bold indicate pole position) (Races in italics indicate fastest lap)

Year	Entrant	Chassis	Engine	1	2	3	4	5	6	7	8	9	10	11	12	13	14	15	16	17	18	19	20	21
1961	Emeryson Cars	Emeryson 1001	Climax S4	LOM	GLV	PAU	BRX	VIE	AIN	SYR	NAP	LON	SIL	SOL; Ret	KAN	DAN	MOD	FLG	OUL					
1961	Emeryson Cars	Emeryson 1004	Climax S4																	LEW; 2	VAL	RAN	NAT	RSA
1964	Team Lotus	Lotus 25	Climax V8	DMT	NWT	SYR; 3			SOL; Ret	MED; 5														
1964	Team Lotus	Lotus 33	Climax V8								RAN; 16													
1964	Team Lotus	Lotus 32	Cosworth S4				AIN; 6	INT																
1965	Team Lotus	Lotus 33	Climax V8	ROC; 1	SYR; Ret	SMT; DNS	INT; 3	MED; Ret	RAN; WD															
1966	Team Lotus	Lotus 33	Climax V8	RSA; 1	SYR																			
1966	Reg Parnell Racing Ltd	Lotus 25/33^{1}	BRM V8			INT; Ret	OUL; Ret																	
1967	Owen Racing Organisation	BRM P83	BRM H16	ROC; 7	SPR; 6																			
1967	Reg Parnell Racing Ltd	BRM P261	BRM V8			INT; 6	SYR; Ret	OUL	ESP															
1968	Owen Racing Organisation	BRM P126	BRM V12	ROC; Ret	INT; Ret	OUL																		

^{1}The Parnell Lotus driven by Spence in 1966 was a written-off 25 rebuilt around a 33 monocoque.

=== 24 Hours of Le Mans results ===
Year	Team	Co-drivers	Car	Class	Laps	Pos.	Class pos.
1967	(United States) Chaparral Cars Inc.	(United States) Phil Hill	Chaparral 2F	P +5.0	225	DNF	DNF

== See also ==
- List of Indianapolis fatalities

Sporting positions
Preceded by Inaugural	Brands Hatch Race of Champions; Winner; 1965	Succeeded by Dan Gurney (1967)
