= 1963 Rand Grand Prix =

- Non-championship race in the 1963 Formula One season
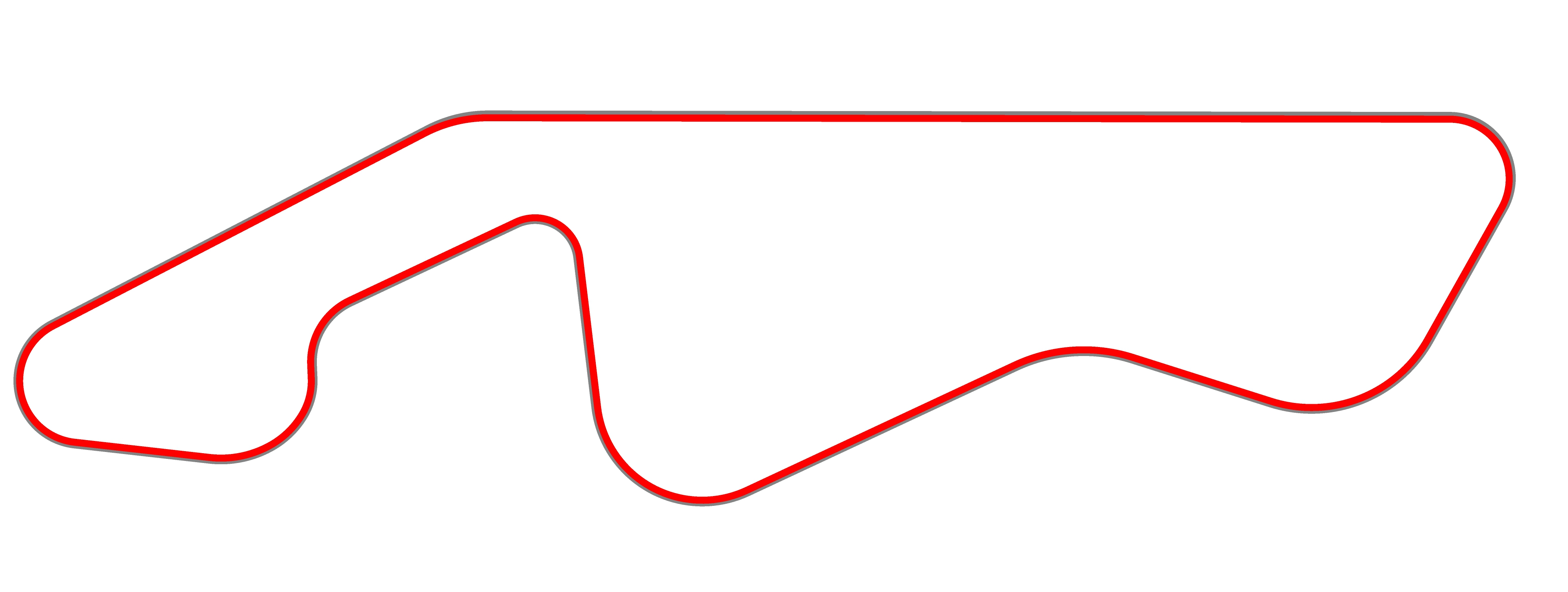

Race details
- Date: 14 December 1963
- Official name: VI Rand Grand Prix
- Location: Kyalami, Johannesburg
- Course: Permanent racing facility
- Course length: 4.096 km (2.545 miles)
- Distance: 25 x 2 laps, 204.8 km (127.25 miles)

Pole position
Driver	(United Kingdom) John Surtees	Ferrari
- Time: 1:34.1

Fastest lap
Driver	(United Kingdom) John Surtees	Ferrari
- Time: 1:34.8 (Heat 1) / 1:35.5 (Heat 2)

Podium
First	(United Kingdom) John Surtees	Ferrari
Second	(Italy) Lorenzo Bandini	Ferrari
Third	(South Africa) Peter de Klerk	Alfa Romeo Special

The 6th Rand Grand Prix was a motor race, run to Formula One rules, held on 14 December 1963 at Kyalami, South Africa. The race was run over two heats, each of 25 laps of the circuit, and was won overall by British driver John Surtees in a Ferrari 156.

Surtees secured pole position for the first heat, and won with team-mate Lorenzo Bandini in second. This result was repeated in the second heat for the Ferraris to take the 1-2 positions very comfortably. Local drivers took the minor placings after Team Lotus suffered from fuel vaporisation problems.

== Results ==
Pos	Driver	Entrant	Constructor	Time/Retired	Grid	Heat 1 / 2
1	(United Kingdom) John Surtees	SEFAC Ferrari	Ferrari	1:20:11.0	1	1st / 1st
2	(Italy) Lorenzo Bandini	SEFAC Ferrari	Ferrari	+ 1:26.2	3	2nd / 2nd
3	(South Africa) Peter de Klerk	Otelle Nucci	Alfa Special-Alfa Romeo	+ 2:19.3	5	3rd / 4th
4	(Federation of Rhodesia and Nyasaland) John Love	John Love	Cooper-Climax	+ 2:19.5	6	4th / 3rd
5	(South Africa) Ernie Pieterse	Lawson Organisation	Lotus-Climax	+ 4:03.8	7	7th / 8th
6	(United Kingdom) David Prophet	David Prophet	Brabham-Ford	+ 4:19.0	12	9th / 7th
7	(South Africa) Paddy Driver	Selby Auto Spares	Lotus-BRM	49 laps	10	11th / 9th
8	(South Africa) Doug Serrurier	Otelle Nucci	LDS-Alfa Romeo	40 laps	9	5th / 11th
9	(South Africa) Gene Bosman	Gene Bosman	LDS-Alfa Romeo	48 laps	14	12th / 10th
10	(United Kingdom) Trevor Taylor	Team Lotus	Lotus-Climax	46 laps	2	17th / 6th
11	(South Africa) Dave Charlton	Ecurie Tomahawk	Lotus-Ford	46 laps	18	13th / 17th
12	(South Africa) Alex Blignaut	Team Valencia	Cooper-Climax	46 laps	19	14th / 15th
13	(South Africa) Jack Holme	Jackie Holme	Lotus-Climax	46 laps	17	16th / 14th
14	(South Africa) Rauten Hartmann	Rauten Hartmann	Netuar-Peugeot	46 laps	20	15th / 16th
15	(South Africa) Clive Trundell	Clive Trundell	Cooper-Climax	44 laps	13	18th / 13th
16	(United Kingdom) Jim Clark	Team Lotus	Lotus-Climax	43 laps	4	19th / 5th
17	(South Africa) David Clapham	Scuderia Los Amigos	LDS-Climax	37 laps	15	20th / 18th
18	(South Africa) George van Straaten	George van Straaten	LDS-Ford	34 laps / Engine	16	Ret / 12th
Ret	(Federation of Rhodesia and Nyasaland) Sam Tingle	Sam Tingle	LDS-Alfa Romeo	Mechanical	21	8th / Ret
Ret	(South Africa) Brausch Niemann	Ted Lanfear	Lotus-Ford	Lost wheel / Ignition	8	Ret / Ret
Ret	(South Africa) Trevor Blokdyk	Scuderia Lupini	Cooper-Maserati	Oil line	11	6th / Ret
Ret	(Federation of Rhodesia and Nyasaland) Clive Puzey	Clive Puzey	Lotus-Climax	Gearbox	22	Ret / DNS
WD	(South Africa) Bruce Huntley	Bruce Huntley	Cooper-Alfa Romeo		-	/ -
WD	(South Africa) Bob Hay	Bob Hay	Lotus-Climax		-	/ -
WD	(South Africa) Clive Underwood	Clive Underwood	Cooper-Alfa Romeo		-	/ -

- Blokdyk also entered his Cooper-Alfa Romeo and recorded a faster practice time in this car than in the car he ultimately raced.
- Ferrari entered a third car but withdrew it without designating a driver.

Previous race: 1963 International Gold Cup	Formula One non-championship races 1963 season	Next race: 1964 Daily Mirror Trophy
Previous race: 1962 Rand Grand Prix	Rand Grand Prix	Next race: 1964 Rand Grand Prix
