= 1965 Rand Grand Prix =

- Non-championship race in the 1965 Formula One season
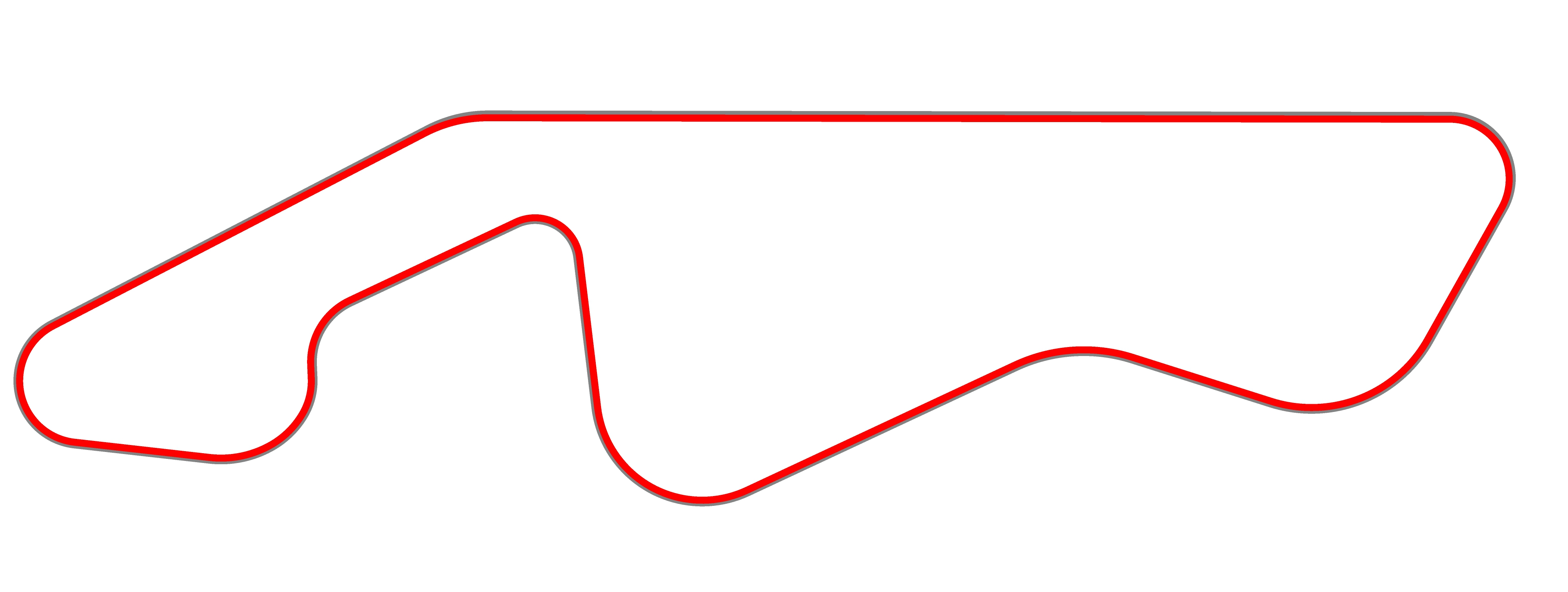

Race details
- Date: 4 December 1965
- Official name: VIII Rand Grand Prix
- Location: Kyalami, Johannesburg
- Course: Permanent racing facility
- Course length: 4.087 km (2.5395 miles)
- Distance: 50 laps, 204.35 km (126.98 miles)

Pole position
Driver	(Australia) Jack Brabham	Brabham-Climax
- Time: 1:30.8

Fastest lap
Driver	(Australia) Jack Brabham	Brabham-Climax
- Time: 1:31.5

Podium
First	(Australia) Jack Brabham	Brabham-Climax
Second	(South Africa) Peter de Klerk	Brabham-Climax
Third	(Australia) Paul Hawkins	Lotus-Climax

The 8th Rand Grand Prix was a motor race, run to Formula One-style rules, held on 4 December 1965 at Kyalami, South Africa. The race was run over 50 laps of the circuit, and was won by Australian driver Jack Brabham in a Brabham BT11.

The Formula One rules for 1966 were to dispense with the old 1.5-litre engines in favour of 3-litre engines. The South African Drivers' Championship had already been run to these rules throughout 1965, so this race was the first in which some of the established drivers and teams from the World Championship competed under the new rules, while the local drivers already had experience with them.

== Results ==
Pos	Driver	Entrant	Constructor	Time/Retired	Grid
1	(Australia) Jack Brabham	Scuderia Scribante	Brabham-Climax	1.18:11.2	1
2	(South Africa) Peter de Klerk	Otelle Nucci	Brabham-Climax	+ 5.9 s	3
3	(Australia) Paul Hawkins	Reg Parnell (Racing)	Lotus-Climax	+ 1:23.4 s	7
4	(Rhodesia) John Love	John Love Motors	Cooper-Climax	49 laps	2
5	(Switzerland) Jo Siffert	Rob Walker Racing Team	Brabham-BRM	49 laps	8
6	(United Kingdom) Innes Ireland	Reg Parnell (Racing)	Lotus-BRM	49 laps	5
7	(Rhodesia) Sam Tingle	Sam Tingle	LDS-Climax	49 laps	9
8	(South Africa) Doug Serrurier	Doug Serrurier	LDS-Climax	47 laps	10
9	(Rhodesia) Clive Puzey	Clive Puzey Motors	Lotus-Climax	46 laps	11
10	(South Africa) Tony Jefferies	John Love Motors	Cooper-Climax	46 laps	15
11	(South Africa) Jack Holme	Jack Holme	LDS-Ford	42 laps	14
Ret	(United Kingdom) Bob Anderson	DW Racing Enterprises	Brabham-Climax	Oil pressure	4
Ret	(South Africa) Brausch Niemann	Ted Lanfear	Lotus-Ford		13
Ret	(Sweden) Jo Bonnier	Rob Walker Racing Team	Lotus-Climax	Radiator	6
Ret	(South Africa) Jackie Pretorius	Scuderia Scribante	Lotus-Climax	Overheating	12
Ret	(United Kingdom) David Prophet	David Prophet (Racing)	Lotus-Maserati	Camshaft	16
DNS	(South Africa) Dave Charlton	Ecurie Tomahawk	Lotus-Ford	Engine in practice	-
DNS	(South Africa) David Hume	Team Valencia	LDS-Climax		-
WD	(United Kingdom) Mike Spence	Scuderia Scribante	Lotus-Climax		-

- Jackie Pretorius was also entered under his own name to drive an LDS-Alfa Romeo but did not race this car.

Previous race: 1965 Mediterranean Grand Prix	Formula One non-championship races 1965 season	Next race: 1966 South African Grand Prix
Previous race: 1964 Rand Grand Prix	Rand Grand Prix	Next race: —
