= Netuar =

South African racing car constructor

Netuar was a South African racing car constructor, which competed in 22 non-World Championship Formula One races.

== Overview ==
Netuar was founded by Rauten Hartman in 1961. The name Netuar is "Rauten" spelled backwards. They raced in non-championship Formula One races from 1961 to 1964 and again in 1966 and 1967. Their first race was the 1961 Rand Grand Prix, and their last was the 1967 Pat Fairfield Trophy. Their best result was 5th in the 1966 Easter Grand Prix. The driver for all the races was Rauten Hartman. They used Peugeot 403 engines in all races except the 1967 races, when they used Alfa Romeo engines. Netuar competed in other open-wheel races in southern Africa as early as 1958 and also took part in hill-climb races in the region. The car was designed and built from scratch by Hartman himself. As of 2019 the car has been rebuilt to its 1964 specification and has begun to race again, driven by South African born driver Arnout Kok.
