= 1963 South African Grand Prix =

Race details
- Date: 28 December 1963
- Official name: 10th International RAC Grand Prix of South Africa
- Location: Prince George Circuit; East London, South Africa
- Course: Temporary road circuit
- Course length: 3.920 km (2.436 miles)
- Distance: 85 laps, 333.175 km (207.025 miles)
- Weather: Hot, dry and windy

Pole position
| Driver | (United Kingdom) Jim Clark | Lotus-Climax |
- Time: 1:28.9

Fastest lap
| Driver | (United States) Dan Gurney | Brabham-Climax |
- Time: 1:29.1 on lap 33

Podium
| First | (United Kingdom) Jim Clark | Lotus-Climax |
| Second | (United States) Dan Gurney | Brabham-Climax |
| Third | (United Kingdom) Graham Hill | BRM |

The 1963 South African Grand Prix, formally titled the 10th International RAC Grand Prix of South Africa, was a Formula One motor race held at East London on 28 December 1963. It was the tenth and final race in both the 1963 World Championship of Drivers and the 1963 International Cup for Formula One Manufacturers. The 85-lap race was won from pole position by Jim Clark in a works Lotus-Climax, the Scottish driver achieving his seventh win of the 1963 Championship. Dan Gurney finished second in a Brabham-Climax, while Graham Hill was third in a BRM. It would be the last Formula One race in December until the 2019 Abu Dhabi Grand Prix.

== Classification ==
=== Qualifying ===
| Pos | No | Driver | Constructor | Qualifying times | | | Gap |
| Pos | No | Driver | Constructor | Q1 | Q2 | Q3 | Gap |
|---|---|---|---|---|---|---|---|
| 1 | 1 | (United Kingdom) Jim Clark | Lotus-Climax | 1:30.2 | 1:28.9 | 1:29.7 | — |
| 2 | 8 | (Australia) Jack Brabham | Brabham-Climax | 1:30.1 | 1:29.0 | 1:31.3 | +0.1 |
| 3 | 9 | (United States) Dan Gurney | Brabham-Climax | 1:30.2 | 1:29.1 | 1:29.7 | +0.2 |
| 4 | 3 | (United Kingdom) John Surtees | Ferrari | 1:29.8 | 1:30.2 | 1:30.8 | +0.9 |
| 5 | 4 | (Italy) Lorenzo Bandini | Ferrari | 1:31.0 | 1:30.2 | 1:31.5 | +1.3 |
| 6 | 5 | (United Kingdom) Graham Hill | BRM | 1:31.2 | 1:30.4 | 1:30.3 | +1.4 |
| 7 | 6 | (United States) Richie Ginther | BRM | 1:32.6 | 1:31.2 | 1:30.4 | +1.5 |
| 8 | 2 | (United Kingdom) Trevor Taylor | Lotus-Climax | 1:31.4 | 1:30.4 | No time | +1.5 |
| 9 | 10 | (New Zealand) Bruce McLaren | Cooper-Climax | 1:31.3 | 1:31.2 | 1:32.2 | +2.3 |
| 10 | 11 | (South Africa) Tony Maggs | Cooper-Climax | 1:32.4 | 1:31.5 | No time | +2.6 |
| 11 | 12 | (Sweden) Jo Bonnier | Cooper-Climax | 1:32.4 | No time | 1:32.0 | +3.1 |
| 12 | 7 | (South Africa) Ernie Pieterse | Lotus-Climax | 1:34.5 | 1:35.0 | 1:34.6 | +5.6 |
| 13 | 19 | (Federation of Rhodesia and Nyasaland) John Love | Cooper-Climax | 1:34.6 | No time | 1:34.6 | +5.7 |
| 14 | 22 | (United Kingdom) David Prophet | Brabham-Ford | 1:46.4 | No time | 1:35.5 | +6.6 |
| 15 | 21 | (South Africa) Brausch Niemann | Lotus-Ford | 1:36.4 | 1:35.6 | 1:36.8 | +6.7 |
| 16 | 18 | (South Africa) Peter de Klerk | Alfa Special-Alfa Romeo | 1:35.7 | 1:36.1 | No time | +6.8 |
| 17 | 20 | (Federation of Rhodesia and Nyasaland) Sam Tingle | LDS-Alfa Romeo | 1:35.8 | No time | 1:37.3 | +6.9 |
| 18 | 16 | (South Africa) Doug Serrurier | LDS-Alfa Romeo | 1:36.4 | 1:36.8 | 1:38.2 | +7.5 |
| 19 | 23 | (South Africa) Trevor Blokdyk | Cooper-Maserati | 1:36.5 | No time | 1:41.7 | +7.6 |
| 20 | 14 | (Netherlands) Carel Godin de Beaufort | Porsche | 1:37.1 | 1:36.6 | No time | +7.7 |
| 21 | 15 | (South Africa) Paddy Driver | Lotus-BRM | 1:38.7 | 1:36.9 | 1:37.5 | +8.0 |

=== Race ===
| Pos | No | Driver | Constructor | Laps | Time/Retired | Grid | Points |
|---|---|---|---|---|---|---|---|
| 1 | 1 | (United Kingdom) Jim Clark | Lotus-Climax | 85 | 2:10:36.9 | 1 | 9 |
| 2 | 9 | (United States) Dan Gurney | Brabham-Climax | 85 | +1:06.8 | 3 | 6 |
| 3 | 5 | (United Kingdom) Graham Hill | BRM | 84 | +1 lap | 6 | 4 |
| 4 | 10 | (New Zealand) Bruce McLaren | Cooper-Climax | 84 | +1 lap | 9 | 3 |
| 5 | 4 | (Italy) Lorenzo Bandini | Ferrari | 84 | +1 lap | 5 | 2 |
| 6 | 12 | (Sweden) Jo Bonnier | Cooper-Climax | 83 | +2 laps | 11 | 1 |
| 7 | 11 | (South Africa) Tony Maggs | Cooper-Climax | 82 | +3 laps | 10 | |
| 8 | 2 | (United Kingdom) Trevor Taylor | Lotus-Climax | 81 | +4 laps | 8 | |
| 9 | 19 | (Federation of Rhodesia and Nyasaland) John Love | Cooper-Climax | 80 | +5 laps | 13 | |
| 10 | 14 | (Netherlands) Carel Godin de Beaufort | Porsche | 79 | +6 laps | 20 | |
| 11 | 16 | (South Africa) Doug Serrurier | LDS-Alfa Romeo | 78 | +7 laps | 18 | |
| 12 | 23 | (South Africa) Trevor Blokdyk | Cooper-Maserati | 77 | +8 laps | 19 | |
| 13 | 8 | (Australia) Jack Brabham | Brabham-Climax | 70 | Spun off | 2 | |
| 14 | 21 | (South Africa) Brausch Niemann | Lotus-Ford | 66 | +19 laps | 15 | |
| Ret | 18 | (South Africa) Peter de Klerk | Alfa Special-Alfa Romeo | 53 | Gearbox | 16 | |
| Ret | 22 | (United Kingdom) David Prophet | Brabham-Ford | 49 | Oil pressure | 14 | |
| Ret | 3 | (United Kingdom) John Surtees | Ferrari | 43 | Engine | 4 | |
| Ret | 6 | (United States) Richie Ginther | BRM | 43 | Halfshaft | 7 | |
| Ret | 7 | (South Africa) Ernie Pieterse | Lotus-Climax | 3 | Engine | 12 | |
| Ret | 20 | (Federation of Rhodesia and Nyasaland) Sam Tingle | LDS-Alfa Romeo | 2 | Halfshaft | 17 | |
| DNS | 15 | (South Africa) Paddy Driver | Lotus-BRM | | Practice accident | 21 | |
| WD | 17 | (South Africa) Neville Lederle | Lotus-Climax | | Driver injured | | |
| WD | | (United Kingdom) Mike Hailwood | Lola-Climax | | | | |

== Notes ==
- This was the Formula One World Championship debut for South African drivers Paddy Driver, Peter de Klerk, Brausch Niemann, and Trevor Blokdyk. It was also the debut for Rhodesian driver Sam Tingle and British driver David Prophet.
- This race marked the first fastest lap for the Brabham team.

== Final Championship standings ==
Drivers' Championship standings

| | Pos | Driver | Points |
|---|---|---|---|
| | 1 | (United Kingdom) Jim Clark | 54 (73) |
| 1 | 2 | (United Kingdom) Graham Hill | 29 |
| 1 | 3 | (United States) Richie Ginther | 29 (34) |
| | 4 | (United Kingdom) John Surtees | 22 |
| 2 | 5 | (United States) Dan Gurney | 19 |

Constructors' Championship standings

| | Pos | Constructor | Points |
|---|---|---|---|
| | 1 | (United Kingdom) Lotus-Climax | 54 (74) |
| | 2 | (United Kingdom) BRM | 36 (45) |
| 1 | 3 | (United Kingdom) Brabham-Climax | 28 (30) |
| 1 | 4 | (Italy) Ferrari | 26 |
| | 5 | (United Kingdom) Cooper-Climax | 25 (26) |

- Notes: Only the top five positions are included for both sets of standings. Only the best 6 results counted towards the Championship. Numbers without parentheses are Championship points; numbers in parentheses are total points scored.

| Previous race: 1963 Mexican Grand Prix | FIA Formula One World Championship; 1963 season | Next race: 1964 Monaco Grand Prix |
| Previous race: 1962 South African Grand Prix | South African Grand Prix | Next race: 1965 South African Grand Prix |
