= 1965 South African Grand Prix =

Race details
- Date: 1 January 1965
- Official name: 11th International RAC Grand Prix of South Africa
- Location: Prince George Circuit; East London, South Africa
- Course: Temporary road circuit
- Course length: 3.920 km (2.436 miles)
- Distance: 85 laps, 333.175 km (207.025 miles)

Pole position
Driver	(United Kingdom) Jim Clark	Lotus-Climax
- Time: 1:27.2

Fastest lap
Driver	(United Kingdom) Jim Clark	Lotus-Climax
- Time: 1:27.6 on lap 80

Podium
First	(United Kingdom) Jim Clark	Lotus-Climax
Second	(United Kingdom) John Surtees	Ferrari
Third	(United Kingdom) Graham Hill	BRM

The 1965 South African Grand Prix was a Formula One (F1) motor race held at East London on 1 January 1965. While originally scheduled to be the last race of the 1964 season, it was moved back a week and thus became race 1 of 10 in the 1965 Formula One season. This scheduling change meant that the cars which were fielded were 1964 season cars, as no one had had the time to develop their 1965 designs as of yet. The 85-lap race was won by Lotus driver Jim Clark after he started from pole position. John Surtees finished second for the Ferrari team and BRM driver Graham Hill came in third. This was the World Championship debut race of the future world champion Jackie Stewart.

== Race report ==
Jim Clark celebrated Hogmanay by dominating the race, leading from pole and winning by half a minute from Graham Hill and John Surtees who were never able to threaten. He even had time to complete an extra lap after the chequered flag was waved a lap too early. Clark also made the first ever lap of the East London circuit at over 100 mph in practice. Clark's teammate Mike Spence was in second place until he spun on oil on the sixtieth lap; he finished in fourth. Bruce McLaren and Championship débutant Jackie Stewart completed the points positions. Jack Brabham had been in competition for second place but his car broke down with ignition troubles four laps from the end.

== Classification ==
=== Pre-qualifying ===
A special pre-qualifying session was run for "local" drivers whereby they had to lap the circuit in under 1:37 in order to advance to qualifying proper, which all but three of them did.

Pos	No	Driver	Constructor	Time
—	18	(Australia) Paul Hawkins	Brabham-Ford	-1:37.0
—	19	(United Kingdom) David Prophet	Brabham-Ford	-1:37.0
—	20	(South Africa) Peter de Klerk	Alfa Special-Alfa Romeo	-1:37.0
—	21	(South Africa) Doug Serrurier	LDS-Climax	-1:37.0
—	22	(South Africa) Ernie Pieterse	Lotus-Climax	-1:37.0
—	23	(South Africa) Neville Lederle	Lotus-Climax	-1:37.0
—	25	(Rhodesia) Sam Tingle	LDS-Alfa Romeo	-1:37.0
—	27	(South Africa) Brausch Niemann	Lotus-Ford	-1:37.0
—	28	(South Africa) Trevor Blokdyk	Cooper-Ford	-1:37.0
—	24	(Rhodesia) Clive Puzey	Lotus-Climax	+1:37.0
—	29	(South Africa) Jackie Pretorius	LDS-Alfa Romeo	+1:37.0
—	32	(South Africa) Dave Charlton	Lotus-Ford	+1:37.0

=== Qualifying ===
Pos	No	Driver	Constructor	Time	Gap
1	5	(United Kingdom) Jim Clark	Lotus-Climax	1:27.2	—
2	1	(United Kingdom) John Surtees	Ferrari	1:28.1	+0.9
3	7	(Australia) Jack Brabham	Brabham-Climax	1:28.3	+1.1
4	6	(United Kingdom) Mike Spence	Lotus-Climax	1:28.3	+1.1
5	3	(United Kingdom) Graham Hill	BRM	1:28.6	+1.4
6	2	(Italy) Lorenzo Bandini	Ferrari	1:29.3	+2.1
7	11	(Sweden) Jo Bonnier	Brabham-Climax	1:29.3	+2.1
8	9	(New Zealand) Bruce McLaren	Cooper-Climax	1:29.4	+2.2
9	8	(United States) Dan Gurney	Brabham-Climax	1:29.5	+2.3
10	10	(Austria) Jochen Rindt	Cooper-Climax	1:30.4	+3.2
11	4	(United Kingdom) Jackie Stewart	BRM	1:30.5	+3.3
12	14	(United Kingdom) Bob Anderson	Brabham-Climax	1:31.0	+3.8
13	15	(South Africa) Tony Maggs	Lotus-BRM	1:31.3	+4.1
14	12	(Switzerland) Jo Siffert	Brabham-BRM	1:31.8	+4.6
15	16	(Australia) Frank Gardner	Brabham-BRM	1:32.3	+5.1
16	18	(Australia) Paul Hawkins	Brabham-Ford	1:33.1	+5.9
17	20	(South Africa) Peter de Klerk	Alfa Special-Alfa Romeo	1:33.3	+6.1
18	17	(Rhodesia) John Love	Cooper-Climax	1:33.8	+6.6
19	19	(United Kingdom) David Prophet	Brabham-Ford	1:33.9	+6.7
20	25	(Rhodesia) Sam Tingle	LDS-Alfa Romeo	1:34.6	+7.4
21	28	(South Africa) Trevor Blokdyk	Cooper-Ford	1:35.2	+8.0
22	23	(South Africa) Neville Lederle	Lotus-Climax	1:35.2	+8.0
23	21	(South Africa) Doug Serrurier	LDS-Climax	1:35.7	+8.5
24	27	(South Africa) Brausch Niemann	Lotus-Ford	1:36.2	+9.0
25	22	(South Africa) Ernie Pieterse	Lotus-Climax	1:37.9	+10.7

=== Race ===
Pos	No	Driver	Constructor	Laps	Time/Retired	Grid	Points
1	5	(United Kingdom) Jim Clark	Lotus-Climax	85	2:06:46.0	1	9
2	1	(United Kingdom) John Surtees	Ferrari	85	+29.0 secs	2	6
3	3	(United Kingdom) Graham Hill	BRM	85	+31.8 secs	5	4
4	6	(United Kingdom) Mike Spence	Lotus-Climax	85	+54.4 secs	4	3
5	9	(New Zealand) Bruce McLaren	Cooper-Climax	84	+1 Lap	8	2
6	4	(United Kingdom) Jackie Stewart	BRM	83	+2 Laps	11	1
7	12	(Switzerland) Jo Siffert	Brabham-BRM	83	+2 Laps	14	
8	7	(Australia) Jack Brabham	Brabham-Climax	81	+4 Laps	3	
9	18	(Australia) Paul Hawkins	Brabham-Ford	81	+4 Laps	16	
10	20	(South Africa) Peter de Klerk	Alfa Special-Alfa Romeo	79	+6 Laps	17	
11	15	(South Africa) Tony Maggs	Lotus-BRM	77	+8 Laps	13	
12	16	(Australia) Frank Gardner	Brabham-BRM	75	+10 Laps	15	
13	25	(Rhodesia) Sam Tingle	LDS-Alfa Romeo	73	+12 Laps	20	
14	19	(United Kingdom) David Prophet	Brabham-Ford	71	+14 Laps	19	
15	2	(Italy) Lorenzo Bandini	Ferrari	66	Ignition	6	
NC	14	(United Kingdom) Bob Anderson	Brabham-Climax	50	+35 Laps	12	
Ret	11	(Sweden) Jo Bonnier	Brabham-Climax	42	Clutch	7	
Ret	10	(Austria) Jochen Rindt	Cooper-Climax	39	Electrical	10	
Ret	17	(Rhodesia) John Love	Cooper-Climax	20	Halfshaft	18	
Ret	8	(United States) Dan Gurney	Brabham-Climax	11	Ignition	9	
DNQ	28	(South Africa) Trevor Blokdyk	Cooper-Ford				
DNQ	23	(South Africa) Neville Lederle	Lotus-Climax				
DNQ	21	(South Africa) Doug Serrurier	LDS-Climax				
DNQ	27	(South Africa) Brausch Niemann	Lotus-Ford				
DNQ	22	(South Africa) Ernie Pieterse	Lotus-Climax				
DNPQ	24	(Rhodesia) Clive Puzey	Lotus-Climax				
DNPQ	29	(South Africa) Jackie Pretorius	LDS-Alfa Romeo				
DNPQ	32	(South Africa) Dave Charlton	Lotus-Ford		Fire in practice		
WD	26	(Rhodesia) Ray Reed	RE-Alfa Romeo				
WD	30	(South Africa) Brian Raubenheimer	Lotus-Ford		Gearbox		
WD	31	(South Africa) David Clapham	Cooper-Maserati				
WD	33	(South Africa) Alex Blignaut	Cooper-Climax				
WD	34	(United Kingdom) Richard Attwood	BRM				

== Notes ==
- This was the Formula One World Championship debut race for British driver and future World Champion Jackie Stewart, Australian driver Paul Hawkins, Rhodesian deiver Clive Puzey and South African drivers Jackie Pretorius and Dave Charlton.
- Jim Clark won the South African Grand Prix for a record two times. Equally, Lotus was record holder with two South African Grand Prix wins. Also, this was the second time a Coventry Climax-powered car won the South African Grand Prix, a new record.
- RE made its Formula One World Championship debut as the first Rhodesian constructor. The car was withdrawn before the start however, and never again made it an appearance.

== Championship standings after the race ==
Drivers' Championship standings

Pos	Driver	Points
1	(United Kingdom) Jim Clark	9
2	(United Kingdom) John Surtees	6
3	(United Kingdom) Graham Hill	4
4	(United Kingdom) Mike Spence	3
5	(New Zealand) Bruce McLaren	2

Constructors' Championship standings

Pos	Constructor	Points
1	(United Kingdom) Lotus-Climax	9
2	(Italy) Ferrari	6
3	(United Kingdom) BRM	4
4	(United Kingdom) Cooper-Climax	2

- Notes: Only the top five positions are included for both sets of standings.

Previous race: 1964 Mexican Grand Prix	FIA Formula One World Championship; 1965 season	Next race: 1965 Monaco Grand Prix
Previous race: 1963 South African Grand Prix	South African Grand Prix	Next race: 1966 South African Grand Prix
