= Rand Grand Prix =

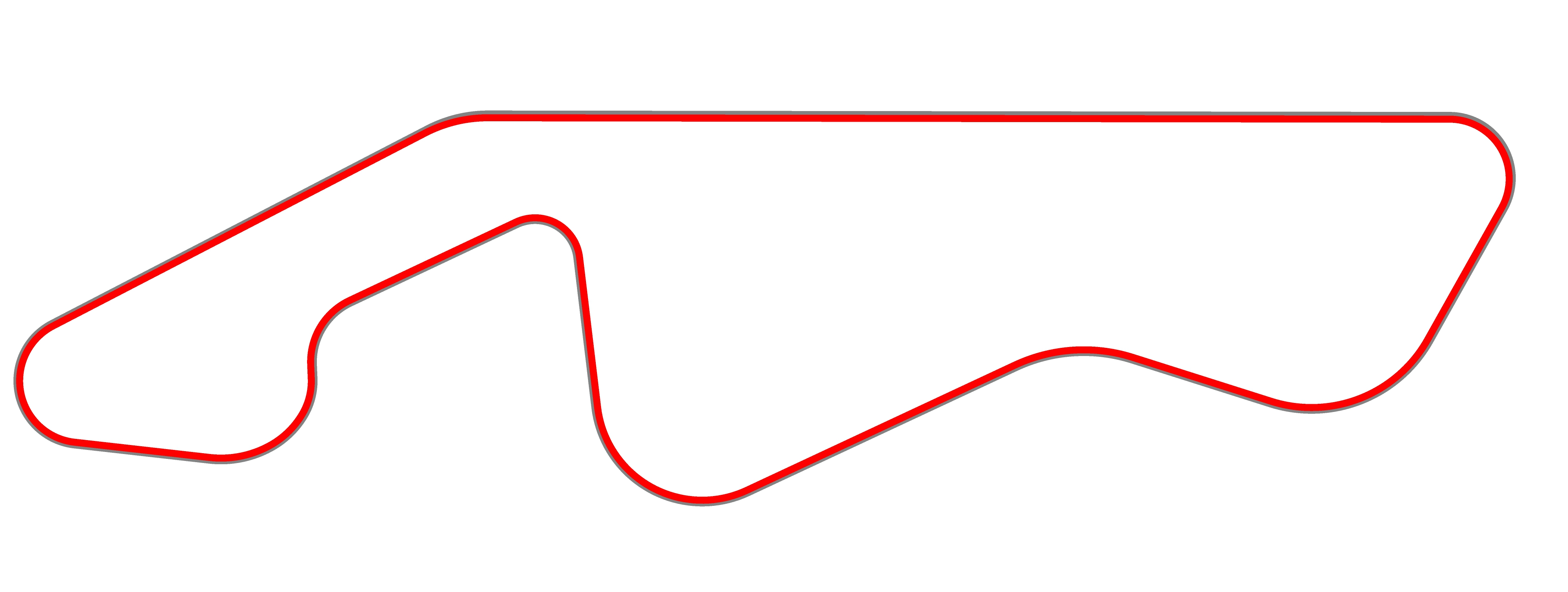
Layout of the Kyalami circuit (1961–1967)

The Rand Grand Prix was a motor race held at various circuits in South Africa. The first event took place in 1937 but it was not held regularly until the 1960s, when it was run to Formula One rules and formed part of the non-championship calendar. At that time, it represented an annual warm-up race before the South African Grand Prix.

== Results ==
- Races shown with a pink background indicate non-Formula One races.

Year	Date	Circuit	Winning driver	Winning constructor	Report
1937 (I)	30 January	Lord Howe Circuit	(United Kingdom) Pat Fairfield	ERA	Report
1937 (II)	16 December	Lord Howe Circuit	(South Africa) Douglas van Riet	Austin	Report
1956	24 March	Palmietfontein	(United Kingdom) Peter Whitehead	Ferrari	Report
1961	9 December	Kyalami	(United Kingdom) Jim Clark	Lotus-Climax	Report
1962	15 December	Kyalami	(United Kingdom) Jim Clark	Lotus-Climax	Report
1963	14 December	Kyalami	(United Kingdom) John Surtees	Ferrari	Report
1964	12 December	Kyalami	(United Kingdom) Graham Hill	Brabham-BRM	Report
1965	4 December	Kyalami	(Australia) Jack Brabham	Brabham-Climax	Report
