= 1965 Race of Champions =

- Non-championship race in the 1965 Formula One season

Race details
- Date: 13 March 1965
- Official name: I Daily Mail Race of Champions
- Location: Brands Hatch
- Course: Permanent racing facility
- Course length: 4.265 km (2.65 miles)
- Distance: 2 x 40 laps, 341.181 km (212 miles)

Pole position
Driver	(United Kingdom) Jim Clark	Lotus-Climax
- Time: 1:34.9

Fastest lap
Driver	(United Kingdom) Jim Clark	Lotus-Climax
- Time: 1:35.4

Podium
First	(United Kingdom) Mike Spence	Lotus-Climax
Second	(United Kingdom) Jackie Stewart	BRM
Third	(Sweden) Jo Bonnier	Brabham-Climax

The 1st Race of Champions was a non-Championship motor race, run to Formula One rules, held on 13 March 1965 at Brands Hatch circuit in Kent, England. The race was run over two heats of 40 laps of the circuit, and was won overall by Mike Spence in a Lotus 33.

The first heat was won by Jim Clark, with Dan Gurney second, and Spence in third place. However, both Clark and Gurney retired from the second heat, which Spence won from Jo Bonnier and Frank Gardner. Jackie Stewart finished seventh in the first heat and fourth in the second, to take second overall.

== Results ==
Pos.	Driver	Entrant	Constructor	Time/Retired	Grid	Heat 1 / 2
1	(United Kingdom) Mike Spence	Team Lotus	Lotus-Climax	2.11:42.0	3	3rd / 1st
2	(United Kingdom) Jackie Stewart	Owen Racing Organisation	BRM	+ 59.4 s	6	7th / 4th
3	(Sweden) Jo Bonnier	Rob Walker Racing Team	Brabham-Climax	79 laps	4	8th / 2nd
4	(Australia) Frank Gardner	John Willment Automobiles	Brabham-BRM	79 laps	15	9th / 3rd
5	(New Zealand) Bruce McLaren	Cooper Car Company	Cooper-Climax	79 laps	10	12th / 5th
6	(Switzerland) Jo Siffert	Rob Walker Racing Team	Brabham-BRM	79 laps	12	11th / 6th
7	(Austria) Jochen Rindt	Cooper Car Company	Cooper-Climax	78 laps	9	13th / 7th
8	(United Kingdom) John Taylor	Gerard Racing	Cooper-Climax	77 laps	17	14th / 8th
9	(United Kingdom) Ian Raby	Ian Raby (Racing)	Brabham-BRM	75 laps	16	15th / 9th
10	(Australia) Paul Hawkins	DW Racing Enterprises	Lotus-Climax	37 laps	-	DNS / 10th
11	(United Kingdom) John Rhodes	Gerard Racing	Cooper-Ford	31 laps	-	DNS / 11th
Ret	(Australia) Jack Brabham	Brabham Racing Organisation	Brabham-Climax	Oil leak	5	4th / Ret
Ret	(United Kingdom) Richard Attwood	Reg Parnell (Racing)	Lotus-BRM	Water hose	11	10th / Ret
Ret	(United Kingdom) Rodney Bloor	Sports Motors (Manchester)	Brabham-Ford	Steering	-	DNS / Ret
Ret	(United Kingdom) Graham Hill	Owen Racing Organisation	BRM	Overheating	2	5th / Ret
Ret	(United States) Dan Gurney	Brabham Racing Organisation	Brabham-Climax	Ignition	13	2nd / Ret
Ret	(United Kingdom) Jim Clark	Team Lotus	Lotus-Climax	Accident	1	1st / Ret
Ret	(United Kingdom) Mike Hailwood	Reg Parnell (Racing)	Lotus-BRM	Accident (both heats)	14	Ret / Ret
Ret	(United Kingdom) John Surtees	SEFAC Ferrari	Ferrari	Fuel injection	7	6th / Ret
Ret	(United Kingdom) Bob Anderson	DW Racing Enterprises	Brabham-Climax	Accident (H1) / Throttle (H2)	8	Ret / Ret
DSQ	(Italy) Ludovico Scarfiotti	Scuderia Centro Sud	BRM	Push start	18	DSQ / -
DSQ	(France) Jo Schlesser	John Willment Automobiles	Brabham-Ford	Outside assistance	20	DSQ / -
Ret	(United States) Masten Gregory	Scuderia Centro Sud	BRM	Driveshaft	19	Ret / -
DNS	(United Kingdom) Alan Rees	John Willment Automobiles	Brabham-Ford		-	-
WD	(Italy) Lorenzo Bandini	SEFAC Ferrari	Ferrari		-	-
WD	(United Kingdom) Alan Rees	Roy Winkelmann Racing	Brabham-Ford	Car not ready	-	-
Sources:

- Bloor, Hawkins and Rhodes were reserves for the first heat and did not take part. All three started the second heat after the disqualifications of Scarfiotti and Schlesser, and Gregory's mechanical problems prevented him from continuing.

Previous race: 1964 Rand Grand Prix	Formula One non-championship races 1965 season	Next race: 1965 Syracuse Grand Prix
Previous race: —	Race of Champions	Next race: 1967 Race of Champions
