= 1965 Mediterranean Grand Prix =

- Non-championship race in the 1965 Formula One season

Race details
- Date: 15 August 1965
- Official name: IV Gran Premio del Mediterraneo
- Location: Autodromo di Pergusa, Sicily
- Course: Permanent racing facility
- Course length: 4.803 km (2.985 miles)
- Distance: 60 laps, 288.172 km (179.1 miles)

Pole position
Driver	(United Kingdom) Jim Clark	Lotus-Climax
- Time: 1:15.8

Fastest lap
Driver	(United Kingdom) Jim Clark	Lotus-Climax
- Time: 1:15.8

Podium
First	(Switzerland) Jo Siffert	Brabham-BRM
Second	(United Kingdom) Jim Clark	Lotus-Climax
Third	(Australia) Frank Gardner	Brabham-BRM

The 4th Mediterranean Grand Prix was a motor race, run to Formula One rules, held on 15 August 1965 at the Autodromo di Pergusa, Sicily. The race was run over 60 laps of the circuit, and was won for the second year in succession by Swiss driver Jo Siffert in a Brabham BT11.

== Results ==
Pos	Driver	Entrant	Constructor	Time/Retired	Grid
1	(Switzerland) Jo Siffert	Rob Walker Racing Team	Brabham-BRM	1.17:05.2	3
2	(United Kingdom) Jim Clark	Team Lotus	Lotus-Climax	+ 0.3 s	1
3	(Australia) Frank Gardner	John Willment Automobiles	Brabham-BRM	59 laps	6
4	(New Zealand) Denny Hulme	Brabham Racing Organisation	Brabham-Climax	59 laps	5
5	(United Kingdom) Innes Ireland	Reg Parnell (Racing)	Lotus-BRM	59 laps	10
6	(Australia) Jack Brabham	Brabham Racing Organisation	Brabham-Climax	58 laps	8
Ret	(New Zealand) Chris Amon	Reg Parnell (Racing)	Lotus-BRM	Holed radiator	4
Ret	(United Kingdom) John Rhodes	Gerard Racing	Cooper-Climax	Handling	12
Ret	(Italy) Giampiero Biscaldi	Scuderia Centro Sud	BRM	Oil pressure	15
Ret	(United Kingdom) Mike Spence	Team Lotus	Lotus-Climax	Accident	2
Ret	(Sweden) Jo Bonnier	Rob Walker Racing Team	Brabham-Climax	Oil pressure	7
Ret	(United Kingdom) Alan Rees	Roy Winkelmann Racing	Brabham-Ford	Piston	9
Ret	(Austria) Jochen Rindt	Roy Winkelmann Racing	Brabham-Ford	Driveshaft joint	11
DSQ	(United States) Masten Gregory	Scuderia Centro Sud	BRM	Changed drivers	13
Ret	(Italy) Giancarlo Baghetti	Scuderia Centro Sud	BRM	Holed radiator	14
DNQ	(United Kingdom) Piers Courage	Gerard Racing	Cooper-Ford		-
DNQ	(United Kingdom) Colin Davis	Scuderia Nord-Ouest	Lotus-Climax		-
WD	(United Kingdom) Bob Anderson	DW Racing Enterprises	Brabham-Climax	Car damaged	-
WD	(Australia) Paul Hawkins	DW Racing Enterprises	Lotus-Climax		-
WD	(United Kingdom) Brian Gubby	Brian Gubby	Lotus-Climax		-

- Masten Gregory was disqualified after a driver change with Giampiero Biscaldi.

Previous race: 1965 BRDC International Trophy	Formula One non-championship races 1965 season	Next race: 1965 Rand Grand Prix
Previous race: 1964 Mediterranean Grand Prix	Mediterranean Grand Prix	Next race: 1967 Mediterranean Grand Prix
