= 1964 Mediterranean Grand Prix =

- Non-championship race in the 1964 Formula One season

Race details
- Date: 16 August 1964
- Official name: III Gran Premio del Mediterraneo
- Location: Autodromo di Pergusa, Sicily
- Course: Permanent racing facility
- Course length: 4.803 km (2.985 miles)
- Distance: 60 laps, 288.172 km (179.1 miles)

Pole position
Driver	(Switzerland) Jo Siffert	Brabham-BRM
- Time: 1:17.1

Fastest lap
Driver	(United Kingdom) Mike Spence	Lotus-Climax
- Time: 1:16.0

Podium
First	(Switzerland) Jo Siffert	Brabham-BRM
Second	(United Kingdom) Jim Clark	Lotus-Climax
Third	(United Kingdom) Innes Ireland	BRP-BRM

The 3rd Mediterranean Grand Prix was a motor race, run to Formula One rules, held on 16 August 1964 at the Autodromo di Pergusa, Sicily. The race was run over 60 laps of the circuit, and was won by Swiss driver Jo Siffert in a Brabham BT11.

British driver Mike Hailwood was involved in an accident during the race, in which his Lotus 25 ended up in Pergusa Lake.

== Results ==
Pos	Driver	Entrant	Constructor	Time/Retired	Grid
1	(Switzerland) Jo Siffert	Siffert Racing Team	Brabham-BRM	1.17:59.3	1
2	(United Kingdom) Jim Clark	Team Lotus	Lotus-Climax	+ 0.1	3
3	(United Kingdom) Innes Ireland	British Racing Partnership	BRP-BRM	+ 2.1	4
4	(New Zealand) Chris Amon	Reg Parnell Racing	Lotus-BRM	59 laps	6
5	(United Kingdom) Mike Spence	Team Lotus	Lotus-Climax	58 laps	5
6	(United States) Peter Revson	Revson Racing (America)	Lotus-BRM	58 laps	9
7	(United Kingdom) John Taylor	Gerard Racing	Cooper-Climax	57 laps	11
8	(Belgium) André Pilette	Equipe Scirocco Belge	Scirocco-Climax	54 laps	14
9	(United Kingdom) Jackie Epstein	Epstein-Eyre Racing Team	BRM	50 laps	15
Ret	(Australia) Frank Gardner	John Willment Automobiles	Brabham-Ford	Piston	13
Ret	(United Kingdom) Trevor Taylor	British Racing Partnership	BRP-BRM	Radius arm	2
Ret	(Australia) Paul Hawkins	John Willment Automobiles	Lola-Cosworth	Gearbox	12
Ret	(Italy) Luigi Malanca	Luigi Malanca	Lotus-Ford	Oil pressure	16
Ret	(United Kingdom) Mike Hailwood	Reg Parnell Racing	Lotus-BRM	Accident	7
DNS	(United Kingdom) Brian Gubby	Brian Gubby	Lotus-Climax	Practice accident	(8)
DNS	(Switzerland) Jean-Claude Rudaz	Fabre Urbain	Cooper-Climax	Engine in practice	(10)
WD	(United Kingdom) Bob Anderson	DW Racing Enterprises	Brabham-Climax		-
WD	(Italy) Giacomo Russo	Scuderia Sorocaima	Lotus	No car	-
WD	(United Kingdom) Ian Raby	Ian Raby (Racing)	Brabham-BRM		-

Previous race: 1964 Solitude Grand Prix	Formula One non-championship races 1964 season	Next race: 1964 Rand Grand Prix
Previous race: 1963 Mediterranean Grand Prix	Mediterranean Grand Prix	Next race: 1965 Mediterranean Grand Prix
