= 1965 Italian Grand Prix =

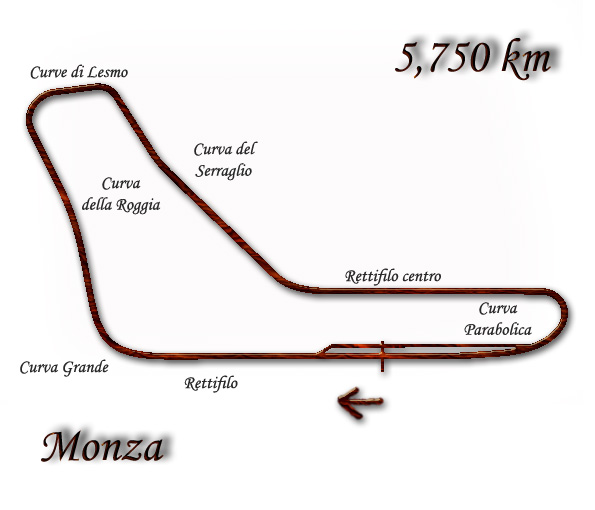

Race details
- Date: 12 September 1965
- Official name: XXXVI Gran Premio d'Italia
- Location: Autodromo Nazionale di Monza; Monza, Italy
- Course: Permanent racing facility
- Course length: 5.750 km (3.573 miles)
- Distance: 76 laps, 437.000 km (271.539 miles)

Pole position
Driver	(United Kingdom) Jim Clark	Lotus-Climax
- Time: 1:35.9

Fastest lap
Driver	(United Kingdom) Jim Clark	Lotus-Climax
- Time: 1:36.4 on lap 46

Podium
First	(United Kingdom) Jackie Stewart	BRM
Second	(United Kingdom) Graham Hill	BRM
Third	(United States) Dan Gurney	Brabham-Climax

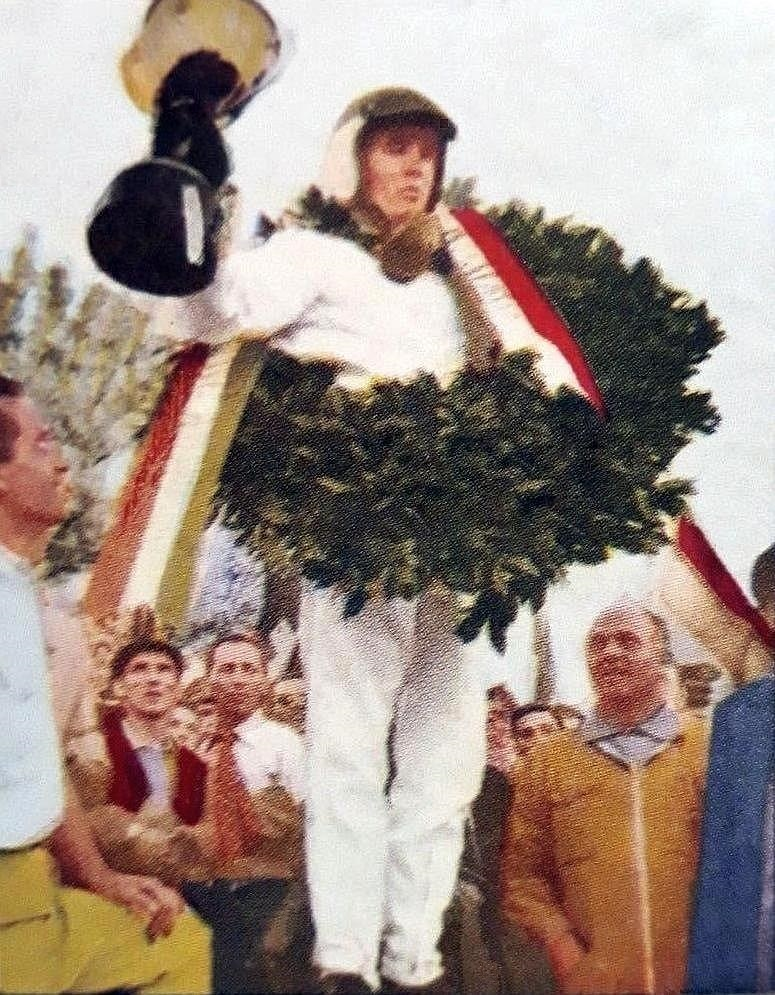
The race was Jackie Stewart's first win in Formula One.

The 1965 Italian Grand Prix (formally the XXXVI Gran Premio d'Italia) was a Formula One motor race held at Monza on 12 September 1965. It was race 8 of 10 in both the 1965 World Championship of Drivers and the 1965 International Cup for Formula One Manufacturers. The race was won by Jackie Stewart who took his first Grand Prix victory, whilst driving for the BRM team. His teammate - Graham Hill - finished second after a closely contested race between both the pair and pole-sitter and Jim Clark, who driving for the Lotus-Climax team, had secured the 1965 Drivers' Championship at the previous race. Clark's fuel-pump failed with a handful of laps to go; this, combined with the preceding retirement of Ferrari driver John Surtees, ensured that Dan Gurney of the Brabham-Climax team picked up the final position on the podium.

== Race report ==
Jim Clark duelled for the lead through the first two-thirds of the race with Graham Hill, Jackie Stewart and John Surtees (who dropped out with clutch problems), until lap 64 when his fuel pump failed. Stewart took up the lead and it was expected that he would move over to give his team leader the victory. The enthusiastic crowd were waiting for the BRM cars to come over the line in formation. However, on the approach to the Parabolica on the last time, Hill moved over too far and bounced across the grass, struggling to maintain grip on the mud and gravel. Stewart therefore claimed his first win in a BRM 1–2 from Hill. Dan Gurney took the final podium place and Lorenzo Bandini, Bruce McLaren and Richard Attwood completed the placings. The race featured 42 lead changes between four drivers (all British), the most ever in a Formula One motor race.

== Classification ==
=== Qualifying ===
Pos	No	Driver	Constructor	Time	Gap
1	24	(United Kingdom) Jim Clark	Lotus-Climax	1:35.9	—
2	8	(United Kingdom) John Surtees	Ferrari	1:36.1	+0.2
3	32	(United Kingdom) Jackie Stewart	BRM	1:36.6	+0.7
4	30	(United Kingdom) Graham Hill	BRM	1:37.1	+1.2
5	4	(Italy) Lorenzo Bandini	Ferrari	1:37.2	+1.3
6	22	(United States) Ronnie Bucknum	Honda	1:37.3	+1.4
7	18	(Austria) Jochen Rindt	Cooper-Climax	1:37.7	+1.8
8	26	(United Kingdom) Mike Spence	Lotus-Climax	1:37.8	+1.9
9	12	(United States) Dan Gurney	Brabham-Climax	1:38.1	+2.2
10	44	(Switzerland) Jo Siffert	Brabham-BRM	1:38.1	+2.2
11	16	(New Zealand) Bruce McLaren	Cooper-Climax	1:38.3	+2.4
12	14	(New Zealand) Denny Hulme	Brabham-Climax	1:38.3	+2.4
13	40	(United Kingdom) Richard Attwood	Lotus-BRM	1:38.8	+2.9
14	42	(Sweden) Jo Bonnier	Brabham-Climax	1:38.9	+3.0
15	6	(Italy) Nino Vaccarella	Ferrari	1:38.9	+3.0
16	46	(Australia) Frank Gardner	Brabham-BRM	1:39.0	+3.1
17	20	(United States) Richie Ginther	Honda	1:39.6	+3.7
18	38	(United Kingdom) Innes Ireland	Lotus-BRM	1:39.8	+3.9
19	10	(Italy) Giancarlo Baghetti	Brabham-Climax	1:40.9	+5.0
20	28	(Italy) Geki	Lotus-Climax	1:41.7	+5.8
21	50	(Italy) Roberto Bussinello	BRM	1:41.7	+5.8
22	52	(Italy) Giorgio Bassi	BRM	1:45.4	+9.5
23	48	(United States) Masten Gregory	BRM	1:45.6	+9.7

=== Race ===
Pos	No	Driver	Constructor	Laps	Time/Retired	Grid	Points
1	32	(United Kingdom) Jackie Stewart	BRM	76	2:04:52.8	3	9
2	30	(United Kingdom) Graham Hill	BRM	76	+3.3	4	6
3	12	(United States) Dan Gurney	Brabham-Climax	76	+16.5	9	4
4	4	(Italy) Lorenzo Bandini	Ferrari	76	+1:15.9	5	3
5	16	(New Zealand) Bruce McLaren	Cooper-Climax	75	+1 lap	11	2
6	40	(United Kingdom) Richard Attwood	Lotus-BRM	75	+1 lap	13	1
7	42	(Sweden) Jo Bonnier	Brabham-Climax	74	+2 laps	14	
8	18	(Austria) Jochen Rindt	Cooper-Climax	74	+2 laps	7	
9	38	(United Kingdom) Innes Ireland	Lotus-BRM	74	+2 laps	18	
10	24	(United Kingdom) Jim Clark	Lotus-Climax	63	Fuel pump	1	
11	26	(United Kingdom) Mike Spence	Lotus-Climax	62	Alternator	8	
12	6	(Italy) Nino Vaccarella	Ferrari	58	Engine	15	
13	50	(Italy) Roberto Bussinello	BRM	58	Oil pressure	21	
14	20	(United States) Richie Ginther	Honda	56	Ignition	17	
Ret	14	(New Zealand) Denny Hulme	Brabham-Climax	46	Suspension	12	
Ret	46	(Australia) Frank Gardner	Brabham-BRM	45	Engine	16	
Ret	44	(Switzerland) Jo Siffert	Brabham-BRM	43	Gearbox	10	
Ret	28	(Italy) Geki	Lotus-Climax	37	Gearbox	20	
Ret	8	(United Kingdom) John Surtees	Ferrari	34	Clutch	2	
Ret	22	(United States) Ronnie Bucknum	Honda	27	Ignition	6	
Ret	48	(United States) Masten Gregory	BRM	22	Gearbox	23	
Ret	10	(Italy) Giancarlo Baghetti	Brabham-Climax	12	Engine	19	
Ret	52	(Italy) Giorgio Bassi	BRM	8	Engine	22	

== Notes ==
- This was the Formula One World Championship debut race for Italian driver Giorgio Bassi.

== Championship standings after the race ==
- **Bold text** indicates the World Champion.

Drivers' Championship standings

Pos	Driver	Points
1	(United Kingdom) **Jim Clark**	54
2	(United Kingdom) Graham Hill	34 (38)
3	(United Kingdom) Jackie Stewart	33 (34)
4	(United Kingdom) John Surtees	17
5	(United States) Dan Gurney	13

Constructors' Championship standings

Pos	Constructor	Points
1	(United Kingdom) Lotus-Climax	54
2	(United Kingdom) BRM	42 (52)
3	(Italy) Ferrari	24
4	(United Kingdom) Brabham-Climax	19
5	(United Kingdom) Cooper-Climax	13

- Notes: Only the top five positions are included for both sets of standings. Only best 6 results counted toward the championship. Numbers without parentheses are championship points, numbers in parentheses are total points scored.

Previous race: 1965 German Grand Prix	FIA Formula One World Championship; 1965 season	Next race: 1965 United States Grand Prix
Previous race: 1964 Italian Grand Prix	Italian Grand Prix	Next race: 1966 Italian Grand Prix
