= 1965 French Grand Prix =

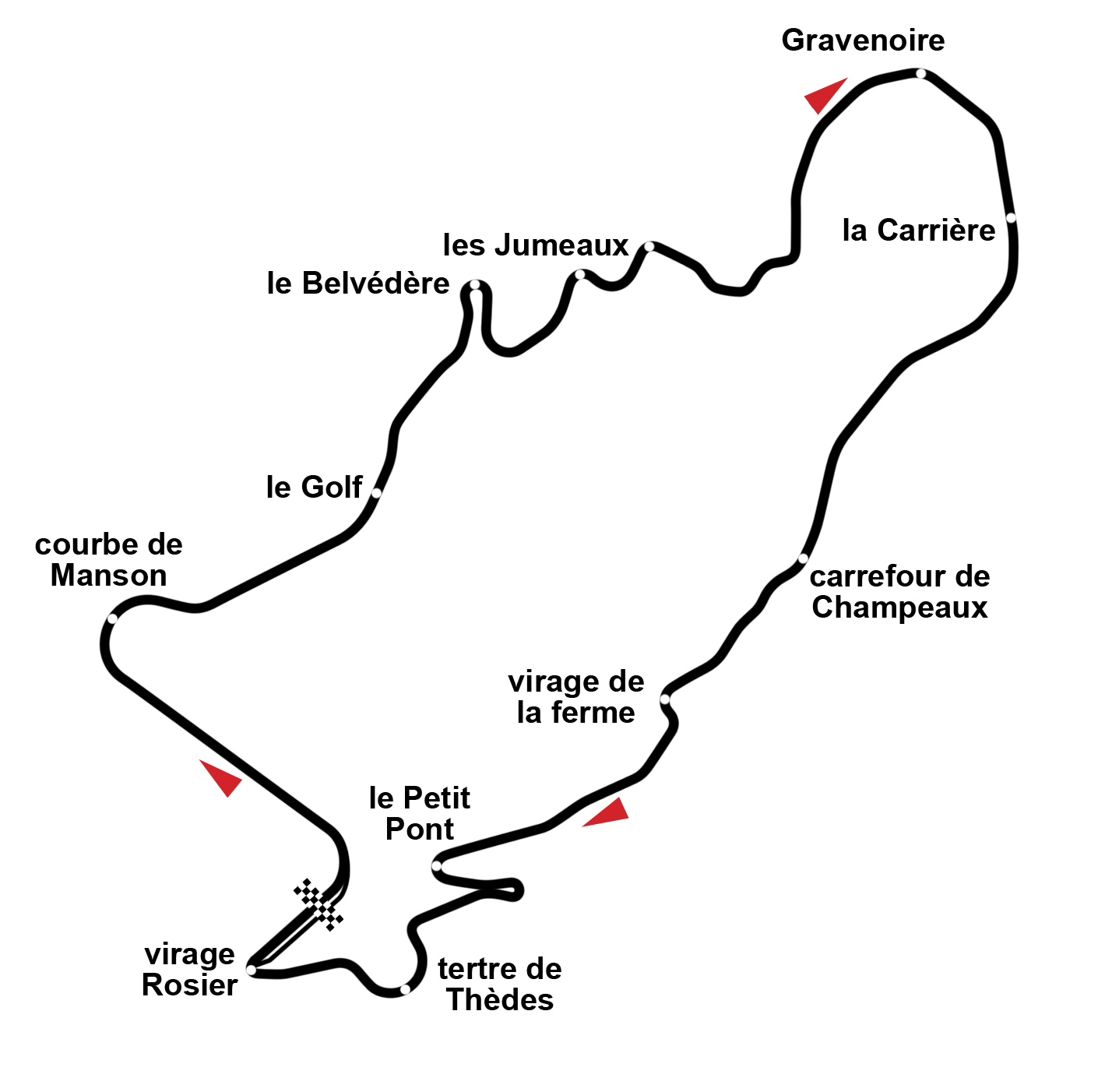
- The Circuit de Charade (1958-1988)

Race details
- Date: 27 June 1965
- Official name: 51e Grand Prix de l'ACF
- Location: Circuit de Charade; Clermont-Ferrand, Auvergne, France
- Course: Permanent racing facility
- Course length: 8.055 km (5.005 miles)
- Distance: 40 laps, 322.2 km (200.2 miles)
- Weather: Sunny

Pole position
Driver	(United Kingdom) Jim Clark	Lotus-Climax
- Time: 3:18.3

Fastest lap
Driver	(United Kingdom) Jim Clark	Lotus-Climax
- Time: 3:18.9 on lap 34

Podium
First	(United Kingdom) Jim Clark	Lotus-Climax
Second	(United Kingdom) Jackie Stewart	BRM
Third	(United Kingdom) John Surtees	Ferrari

The 1965 French Grand Prix was a Formula One motor race held at the Circuit de Charade, Clermont-Ferrand on 27 June 1965. It was race 4 of 10 in both the 1965 World Championship of Drivers and the 1965 International Cup for Formula One Manufacturers.

The 40-lap race was won by Scotland's Jim Clark. Driving the Climax-engined Lotus 25, Clark took pole position, led every lap and set the fastest lap. It was his third win in four races, and his second Grand Slam of the season. Fellow Scottish driver Jackie Stewart finished second in a BRM, with Englishman John Surtees third in a Ferrari.

== Classification ==
=== Qualifying ===
Pos	No	Driver	Constructor	Time	Gap
1	6	(United Kingdom) Jim Clark	Lotus-Climax	3:18.3	—
2	12	(United Kingdom) Jackie Stewart	BRM	3:18.8	+0.5
3	4	(Italy) Lorenzo Bandini	Ferrari	3:19.1	+0.8
4	2	(United Kingdom) John Surtees	Ferrari	3:19.1	+0.8
5	14	(United States) Dan Gurney	Brabham-Climax	3:19.8	+1.5
6	16	(New Zealand) Denny Hulme	Brabham-Climax	3:20.5	+2.2
7	26	(United States) Richie Ginther	Honda	3:21.4	+3.1
8	24	(New Zealand) Chris Amon	Lotus-BRM	3:23.0	+4.7
9	18	(New Zealand) Bruce McLaren	Cooper-Climax	3:23.2	+4.9
10	8	(United Kingdom) Mike Spence	Lotus-Climax	3:23.4	+5.1
11	34	(Sweden) Jo Bonnier	Brabham-Climax	3:23.4	+5.1
12	20	(Austria) Jochen Rindt	Cooper-Climax	3:23.6	+5.3
13	10	(United Kingdom) Graham Hill	BRM	3:23.7	+5.4
14	36	(Switzerland) Jo Siffert	Brabham-BRM	3:25.2	+6.9
15	30	(United Kingdom) Bob Anderson	Brabham-Climax	3:26.0	+7.7
16	28	(United States) Ronnie Bucknum	Honda	3:26.3	+8.0
17	22	(United Kingdom) Innes Ireland	Lotus-BRM	3:30.5	+12.2

=== Race ===
Pos	No	Driver	Constructor	Laps	Time/Retired	Grid	Points
1	6	(United Kingdom) Jim Clark	Lotus-Climax	40	2:14:38.4	1	9
2	12	(United Kingdom) Jackie Stewart	BRM	40	+ 26.3	2	6
3	2	(United Kingdom) John Surtees	Ferrari	40	+ 2:33.5	4	4
4	16	(New Zealand) Denny Hulme	Brabham-Climax	40	+ 2:53.1	6	3
5	10	(United Kingdom) Graham Hill	BRM	39	+ 1 Lap	13	2
6	36	(Switzerland) Jo Siffert	Brabham-BRM	39	+ 1 Lap	14	1
7	8	(United Kingdom) Mike Spence	Lotus-Climax	39	+ 1 Lap	10	
8	4	(Italy) Lorenzo Bandini	Ferrari	36	Accident	3	
9	30	(United Kingdom) Bob Anderson	Brabham-Climax	34	Fuel System	15	
Ret	18	(New Zealand) Bruce McLaren	Cooper-Climax	23	Suspension	9	
Ret	34	(Sweden) Jo Bonnier	Brabham-Climax	21	Alternator	11	
Ret	24	(New Zealand) Chris Amon	Lotus-BRM	20	Fuel System	8	
Ret	22	(United Kingdom) Innes Ireland	Lotus-BRM	18	Gearbox	17	
Ret	14	(United States) Dan Gurney	Brabham-Climax	16	Engine	5	
Ret	26	(United States) Richie Ginther	Honda	9	Ignition	7	
Ret	28	(United States) Ronnie Bucknum	Honda	4	Ignition	16	
Ret	20	(Austria) Jochen Rindt	Cooper-Climax	3	Accident	12	

== Championship standings after the race ==
Drivers' Championship standings

Pos	Driver	Points
1	(United Kingdom) Jim Clark	27
2	(United Kingdom) Graham Hill	17
3	(United Kingdom) Jackie Stewart	17
4	(United Kingdom) John Surtees	13
5	(New Zealand) Bruce McLaren	8

Constructors' Championship standings

	Pos	Constructor	Points
1	1	(United Kingdom) Lotus-Climax	27
1	2	(United Kingdom) BRM	25
	3	(Italy) Ferrari	16
	4	(United Kingdom) Cooper-Climax	8
	5	(United Kingdom) Brabham-Climax	6

- Notes: Only the top five positions are included for both sets of standings.

Previous race: 1965 Belgian Grand Prix	FIA Formula One World Championship; 1965 season	Next race: 1965 British Grand Prix
Previous race: 1964 French Grand Prix	French Grand Prix	Next race: 1966 French Grand Prix
