= Ferrari 330 TRI/LM =

1962 racing sports car

Ferrari 330 TRI/LM Spyder (0808) Ferrari 250 TRI/60 (0780TR)
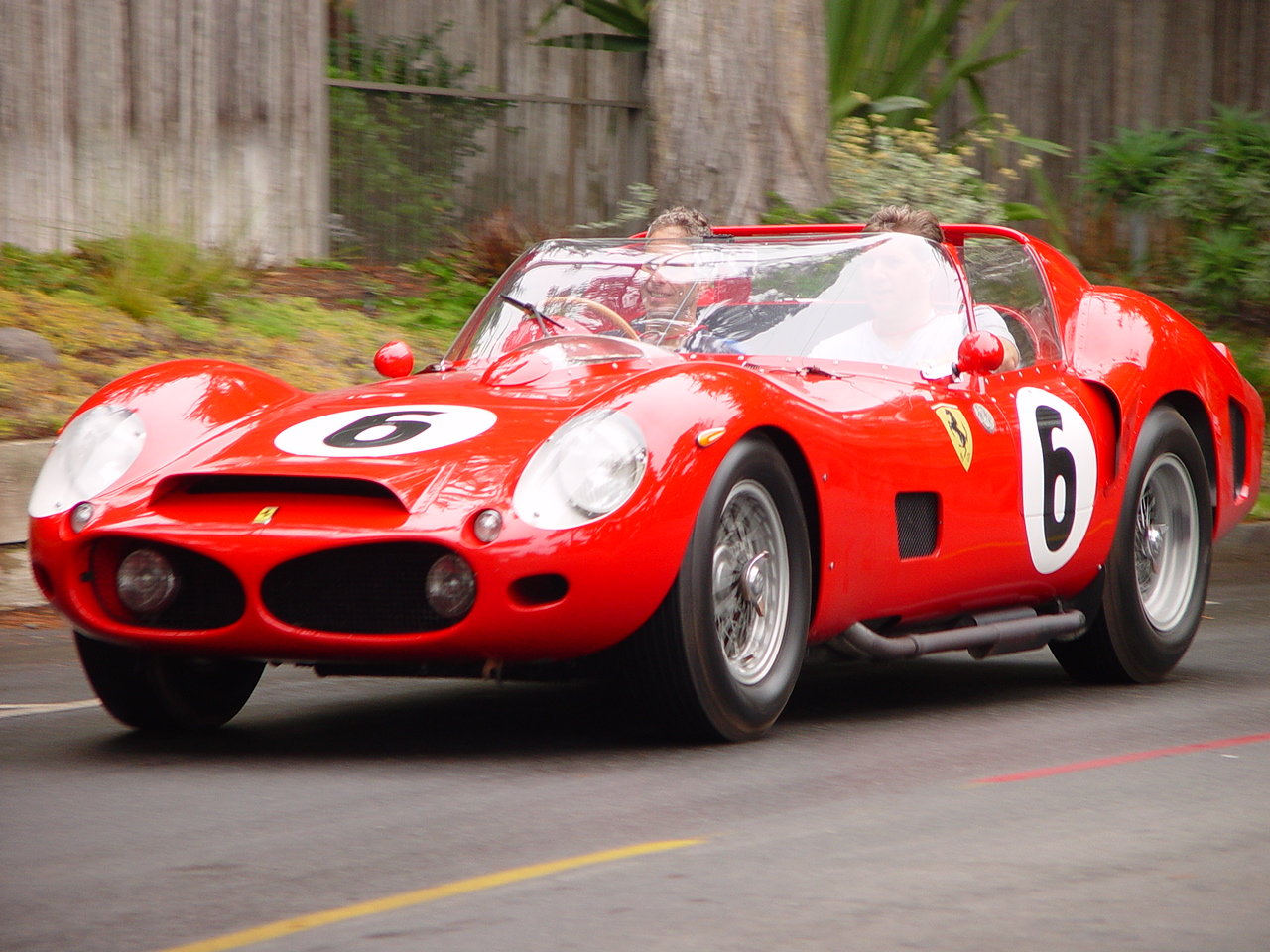
- Category: Sports car racing
- Constructor: Ferrari
- Designer: Medardo Fantuzzi

Technical specifications
- Chassis: tubular steel spaceframe
- Suspension (front): Coil spring and independent wishbone
- Suspension (rear): Coil spring and independent wishbone
- Length: 178 in (452.1 cm)
- Width: 62.6 in (159.0 cm)
- Height: 41.3 in (104.9 cm)
- Axle track: F: 56 in (142.2 cm); R: 55.7 in (141.5 cm)
- Wheelbase: 94.5 in (2,400.3 mm)
- Engine: Tipo 163 3,967 cc (242.1 cu in) V12 naturally-aspirated front-engine, longitudinally mounted
- Transmission: Tipo 568 5-speed manual transmission
- Weight: 820 kg (1,807.8 lb)
- Tyres: F: 6.00 x 16; R: 7.00 x 16

Competition history
- Notable entrants: Scuderia Ferrari; North American Racing Team
- Notable drivers: Olivier Gendebien; Masten Gregory; Graham Hill; Phil Hill; Roger Penske; Pedro Rodriguez; Ricardo Rodríguez
- Debut: 1962 24 Hours of Le Mans
- First win: 1962 24 Hours of Le Mans
- Last win: 1962 Bridgehampton Double 400
- Last event: 1963 24 Hours of Le Mans
Entries	Races	Wins	Podiums
10	8	2	6
Poles	F/Laps		
3	2		

The Ferrari 330 TRI/LM Spyder (chassis number 0808) is a unique racing sports car purpose-built in 1962 by Ferrari to achieve victory at the 24 Hours of Le Mans. It was the last Ferrari racing sports car with a front-mounted engine and the last of a series of Ferrari race cars known as the Testa Rossas. The "I" in its designation indicates that the car has an independent rear suspension (indipendente in Italian).

Beginning in 1960 as a 250 TRI/60 Fantuzzi Spyder (chassis 0780TR), the car was badly damaged in a crash during a practice session for the 1960 Targa Florio road race (its debut). It was rebuilt, failing to finish at the 1960 24 Hours of Le Mans then finishing second at the 1961 12 Hours of Sebring, before being damaged again in its second Targa Florio outing. After finishing second at the 1961 Nürburgring 1000km and 1961 24 Hours of Le Mans, it won at the 1961 Pescara 4 Hours.

Following Pescara, regulatory changes allowed Ferrari to rebuild 0780TR into its final form as the 330 TRI/LM (chassis 0808), with a larger 4.0 liter V12 engine and a new body. The 330 TRI/LM won the 1962 24 Hours of Le Mans, the last front-engine car to win the race. It was then sold to Luigi Chinetti's NART, competing in North America with some success before returning to the 1963 24 Hours of Le Mans. The car was running in third place into the night against newer, factory-mid-engine Ferrari prototypes when it crashed and dropped out of the race.

The 330 TRI/LM's racing career ended after the 1963 24 Hours of Le Mans and it was subsequently repaired and rebuilt as a road car. Since then, it has been owned by several different collectors and restored back to 1962 specification. The car most recently sold to Gregorio Pérez Companc, who paid €7,000,000 in 2007.

== Background ==
The Testa Rossa family began in 1956 with a customer request for a two-liter, four-cylinder sports car capable of defeating arch-rival Maserati's 200 S. This resulted in the creation of the 500 TR, a two-seater spider with engine and suspension based on the Tipo 500 Formula Two car. The 500 TR first raced at the 1956 1000 km Monza, where Peter Collins and Mike Hawthorn took it to its maiden win, with 500 TRs also placing 2nd and 4th.

The unlimited-displacement class of the World Sportscar Championship was ended in response to the accident at the 1957 Mille Miglia, as the ruling bodies of motor racing attempted to make racing safer by reducing engine power and thus overall speed. The World Sportscar Championship then imposed a three-liter displacement limit, which Ferrari supported to accommodate American racer-customers. In response, Ferrari developed the 1957 250 TR, based on the 500 TR chassis but now powered by a highly tuned version of the 250 series Colombo-designed V12. The 250 TR achieved great racing success from 1957 though 1961, although by the end of the 1961 season the 3 liter engine and front-engine, rear-wheel-drive chassis were showing their age. The 330 TRI/LM was the final development of the Testa Rossa platform, before mid-engined cars such as the 250 P took over this racing category.

== History ==
=== Origin as a 250 TRI60 ===
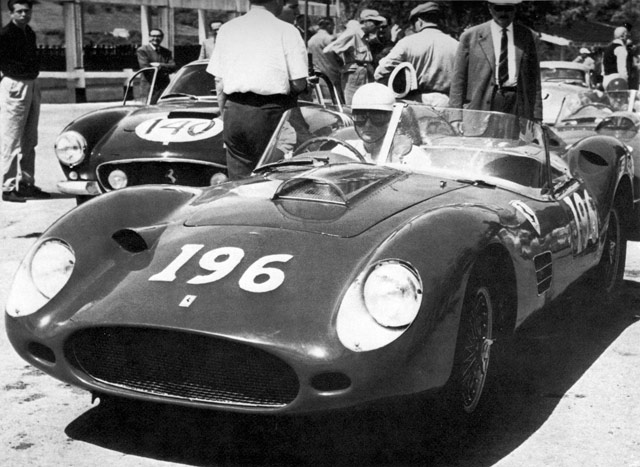
The car, then as 250 TRI/60 s/n 0780TR, at the 1960 Targa Florio.

The car was originally built as a Fantuzzi-bodied 250 TRI60 (0780TR), leaving the factory in March 1960. The car debuted with Scuderia Ferrari at the 1960 Targa Florio, where it was badly damaged by Cliff Allison during a practice session following a tire blowout. The car was rebuilt with parts from a wrecked 250 TR59/60 (0772TR) and subsequently raced at the 1960 24 Hours of Le Mans. Driven by Willy Mairesse and Richie Ginther, it retired with a broken driveshaft in the Sunday morning. The car returned to the factory to be modified with a TRI61-style high rear body with Kamm tail, retaining its 250 TRI/60 front end. In this form the car was used as an aerodynamic test bed by Carlo Chiti and Giotto Bizzarrini to develop the new 1961 TRI61 body.

It returned to racing in the 1961 season for the 12 Hours of Sebring, driven by Giancarlo Baghetti, Mairesse, Ginther and Wolfgang von Trips, finishing second overall behind teammates Phil Hill and Olivier Gendebien. At the Targa Florio it was the team's sole front-engine entry, with Mairesse and Pedro Rodríguez driving. They retired after one of the drivers crashed during practice. 0780TR returned to the factory for repairs and modification of its nose to TRI/61 style. This was completed in time for the car to be run by the factory-supported North American Racing Team in the 1961 1000 km Nürburgring. Driven by Pedro Rodríguez and his younger brother Ricardo, the car finished second behind the Maserati Tipo 61 of Lloyd Casner and Masten Gregory. The Rodriguez brothers had to pit late in the race after destroying a front wheel, eliminating any chance of a win. The car then was entered by Scuderia Ferrari in the 1961 24 Hours of Le Mans, driven by Mairesse and Mike Parkes. After a poor start, they finished second, again behind Hill and Gendebien. They ran third for much of the race, achieving second when the Rodríguez brothers' 250 TRI61 retired with broken pistons with two hours to go. In the season-ending Pescara Grand Prix, 0780TR was driven to victory by Scuderia Ferrari's Lorenzo Bandini and Giorgio Scarlatti, despite an oil leak that saw Bandini fall back to 27th. From this position, he regained second place with his rapid pace and won when the leading Camoradi Maserati Tipo 61 retired.

=== Rebirth as 330 TRI/LM ===
Ferrari had dominated sports-car racing since 1958, with three World Sportscar Championships and three 24 Hours of Le Mans victories in four attempts. In 1962, the CSI (Commission Sportive Internationale) and ACO (Automobile Club de l'Ouest) restructured their rules and classifications to emphasize GT cars and make the three-litre sports-racing class (dominated by cars like the 250 TR) obsolete. The displacement limit for GT cars and the new experimental class was raised to four litres. At this time, Ferrari replaced its sports racers with mid-engine designs and V6s or V8s and decided to rebuild chassis 0780TR as the 330 TRI/LM for the experimental class. This chassis was to be the only 330 TRI/LM ever built.

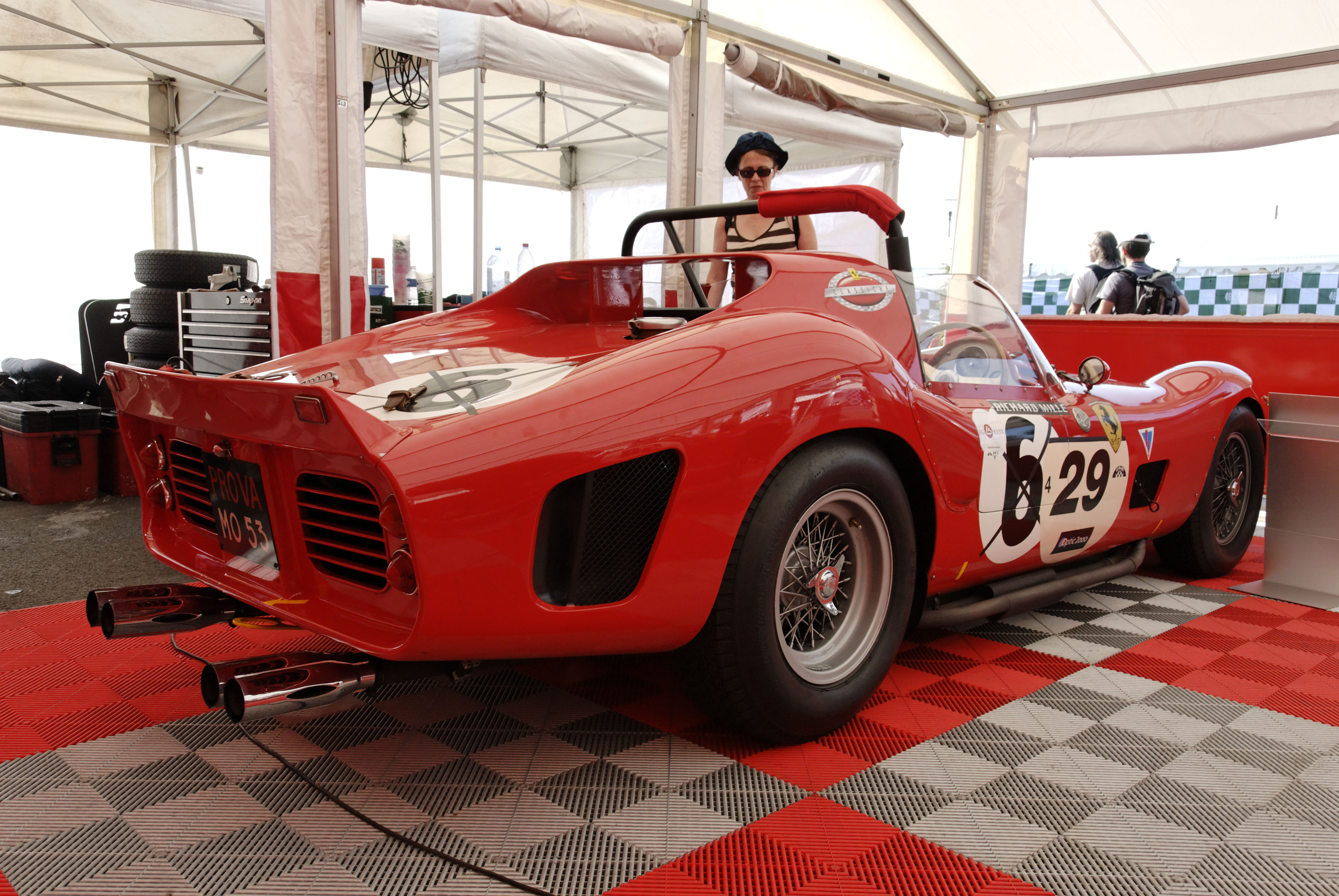
Rear view

The transformation of 250 TRI60 0780TR to the 330 TRI/LM involved significant changes to the engine, body and chassis. The 3 liter 250 series engine was replaced by a Tipo 163 4-litre Colombo V12 with free-breathing cylinder heads, larger valves, six twin-barrel Weber 42DCN carburetors and dry sump lubrication. This engine provided 390 horsepower (290 kW) at 7500 rpm, 50 bhp more than the 250 TR and with a power/displacement ratio of almost 100 hp/liter. The five-speed transaxle was modified with strengthened gears to handle the additional power. The new 4-liter V12 was 4 inches (10 cm) longer than the 250TR's 3-litre Colombo engine, necessitating a new chassis frame to suit the engine and to comply with the new regulations. The frame was 6.3 centimetres (2.5 in) longer to the 250 TR's for better balance, strengthened to accommodate the increased power and torque and accommodated the TRI/61's independent coil-spring suspension system. The transformation was completed with a new body by Fantuzzi with aerodynamic roll hoop as well as a new chassis number, 0808.

=== 1962 24 Hours of Le Mans ===
The 330 TRI/LM made its debut on the second day of the Le Mans test sessions in April. Driven by defending winners Phil Hill and Olivier Gendebien for Scuderia Ferrari, it recorded the fastest lap of the day (4 minutes, 10.8 seconds) despite the wet weather. The 330 TRI/LM skipped the next two World Championship races in favor of further in-house development.

During the race's practice session, the car was 3 1/2 seconds quicker than the competition when Hill broke Mike Hawthorn's lap record. It was not difficult to drive, as Hill said in Road & Track:

Although the 330 was something of a brute in concept, it was not a brutish car to drive. It was also a damn fast car and with it ... The independent two A-arm suspension front and rear made this a very decent-handling, well balanced car.

— Phil Hill, in Carey (2011)

The 330 TRI/LM did not have the aerodynamic lift which had caused steering problems at high speed that plagued earlier Ferraris. According to Hill, "It didn’t exhibit that schizophrenic nature" of being pleasant to drive on slow, tight portions of the circuit but unpleasant on faster portions (for example, the White House turn). He concluded that "[without the] strange nose or tail liftings the 330 was a nice, almost pleasant car to drive."

Co-driver Gendebien had a different opinion of the car, describing it as:

A strange, 4-litre, experimental Ferrari, whose lack of homogeneity conveyed the unpleasant feeling of driving a 2CV which had been fitted with a powerful Mercedes or Ferrari engine. A shaky clutch, fragile gearbox and transmission, inadequate brakes...

— Olivier Gendebien, in Prunet (1983), p. 206

The drivers had problems with a slipping clutch since the first practice session, when the engine was at peak torque as the car accelerated. This was resolved by "treat[ing] the car as gently as possible" and correct shift timing requiring the drivers to shift "a gear higher" than usual). Hill and Gendebien did not expect the car to last the entire duration of the race.

Despite a slow start by Gendebien and ongoing clutch slippage, the 330 TRI/LM's speed enabled him to gain the lead, fending off the Ferrari 246 SP of the Rodríguez brothers and briefly, the Aston Martin DP212 of Graham Hill and Richie Ginther. When the Rodríguez brothers retired at 4.30 am with gearbox issues, Hill and Gendebien inherited a four-lap lead which they increased to five by the end. They thus became the first triple winner driver pairing, with Gendebien becoming the first four-time winner. The 330 TRI/LM was the last front-engine car to achieve an overall win at the 24 Hours of Le Mans.

=== Racing history after 1962 Le Mans ===
Following its victory, the 330 TRI/LM was ineligible to compete in any more European races as intended by Ferrari that season. Chinetti's NART, responsible for Ferrari's North American operations, acquired it as a middle man for Don Rodríguez to enable his son Pedro to race in North America. Upon receiving the car, NART mechanics immediately removed the aerodynamic roll hoop as Chinetti believed it increased drag. The younger Rodríguez won the 1962 Bridgehampton Grand Prix at Bridgehampton and finished second in the 1962 Canadian Grand Prix at Mosport. For the 1962 Nassau Trophy, Masten Gregory substituted for Rodríguez, who was unable to drive after his brother fatally crashed at the Mexican Grand Prix. Gregory finished fourth.

In 1963, Graham Hill and Rodríguez drove the 330 TRI/LM to a third-place finish at the 12 Hours of Sebring behind newer Scuderia Ferrari mid-engine 250 P prototypes. At one point, they held a 3-lap lead over the 250 Ps until mechanical and electrical problems slowed the car down, as well as the driver having to deal with exhaust fumes caused by split exhaust manifold. NART entered the 330 TRI/LM in the 1963 24 Hours of Le Mans to defend its title, upgraded with wider tires. Pedro Rodríguez and Roger Penske drove. They started the race from the pole position but trailed in second place against the Scuderia Ferrari entries until the ninth hour when the engine threw a connecting rod. Oil spilled on the rear tires, causing the car to crash and taking along Jo Bonnier's Porsche 718/8 GTR with it. Driver Penske was uninjured but the car was severely damaged and never raced again.

=== Collector ownership ===
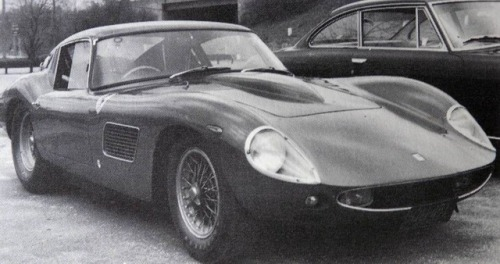
The rebuilt 330 TRI/LM in Fantuzzi body

Following the crash at the 1963 24 Hours of Le Mans, the 330 TRI/LM was sent to the Ferrari factory for repair. At this time a new coupé body was made by Fantuzzi and the car was subsequently returned to Chinetti in the United States as a road car. Hisashi Okada of Long Island brought the car in 1965 and drove it daily on the streets of Manhattan before trading it for a 250 LM in 1974. The car was then sold via Stanley Nowak to Pierre Bardinon. Like Okada, Bardinon also drove the car in New York City up through 1993. In 1974, he commissioned Fantuzzi to restore the car back to its 1962 form, whilst the coupé body was transferred to a 250 GT Coupé (chassis 1087GT). The car was later sold by Bardinon on June 12, 2002, to Rob Myers for US$5,800,000. It was then put up for auction by RM Sotheby's in Monterey, CA on August 17, 2002. It sold at this auction for US$6,500,000 including buyer's premium to Jim Spiro, a money manager from New Orleans. Spiro drove it in road rallies and frequently used it to commute in city traffic. The car narrowly avoided the 2005 devastation of Hurricane Katrina when, two days before the storm, Spiro drove it 10 miles (16 km) west of New Orleans to his friend's garage. The 330 TRI/LM was last sold at RM Sotheby's 2007 Maranello auction, after an unsuccessful auction attempt two years earlier. The buyer was Gregorio Pérez Companc, who paid €7,000,000 including buyer's premium.

== Works cited ==
- Batchelor, Dean (1975). Ferrari - The Early Spyders & Competition Roadsters. Incline Village, NV: DB Publications. ISBN 0914792016. OCLC 1365055.
- Bluemel, Keith (June 2004). "330 TRI/LM, s/n 0808 (Part I)". Cavallino. 141: 36–47.
- Bluemel, Keith; Massini, Marcel (August 2004). "0780 / 0808 (Part II)". Cavallino. 142: 50–58.
- Boddy, William (June 1960). "44th Targa Florio". Motor Sport. Teesdale Publishing Company.
- Boddy, William (July 1961a). "The A.D.A.C. 1,000 Kilometers". Motor Sport. Teesdale Publishing Company.
- Boddy, William (July 1961b). "Les Vingt-Quatre Heures du Mans". Motor Sport. Teesdale Publishing Company.
- Boddy, William (August 1962). "Le Mans 24-Hour race". Motor Sport. Teesdale Publishing Company.
- Carey, Rick (4 January 2011). "Ferrari 330 TRI/LM Testa Rossa". Archived from the original on 4 March 2016.
- Jenkinson, Denis (August 1960). "The Le Mans 24-Hours Race". Motor Sport. Teesdale Publishing Company.
- Jenkinson, Denis (September 1961). "The Four Hours of Pescara". Motor Sport. Teesdale Publishing Company.
- Jenkinson, Denis (July 1963). "The 24 Hours of Le Mans (June 15/16th)". Motor Sport. Teesdale Publishing Company.
- Lamm, John; Queener, Chuck (2007). Ferrari: Stories from Those Who Lived the Legend. Motorbooks International. ISBN 978-0760328330.
- Melissen, Wouter (22 July 2010). "1962 Ferrari 330 TRI/LM". Ultimatecarpage.com.
- Nye, Doug (December 2009). "Ferrari's Fifth Amendment". Motor Sport. Motor Sport Ltd.
- Prunet, Antoine (1983). Ferrari: Sport Racing and Prototypes Competition Cars. New York: Norton. ISBN 0393017990. OCLC 10382200.
- Sheringham, Sam (18 May 2007). "Ferrari Testa Rossa That Won Le Mans May Fetch $10.1 Million". Bloomberg.com. Archived from the original on 6 November 2012.
- Tanner, Hans; Nye, Doug (1984). Ferrari (6th ed.). Sparkford, Yeovil, Somerset: Haynes. ISBN 0854293507. OCLC 12418956.
- Traver Adolphus, David (12 April 2007). "28 Days of Ferrari: Day IV". Hemmings Motor News. Archived from the original on 17 June 2016.
