= 1961 24 Hours of Le Mans =

29th 24 Hours of Le Mans endurance race

Previous: 1960	Next: 1962
Index: Races | Winners

The 1961 24 Hours of Le Mans was a motor race for Sports cars and Grand Touring cars staged at the Circuit de la Sarthe, Le Mans, France on 10 and 11 June 1961. It was the 29th Grand Prix of Endurance and the fourth race of the 1961 World Sportscar Championship. Ferrari and Maserati were the main contenders, with Aston Martin an outside chance.

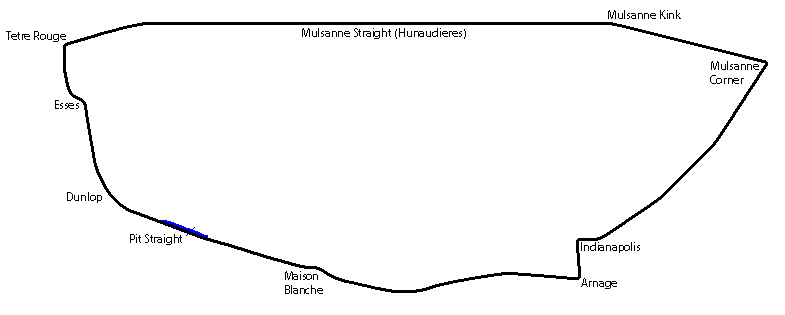
Le Mans in 1961

Ferrari's competition soon wilted in the race – the Maseratis were fast but fragile. The Aston Martins, though reliable, couldn't match the Italian cars’ pace. In the end it was a race between the two works team cars and the North American Racing Team entry driven by the Rodriguez brothers. When the private entry failed with just two hours to go, it was a clear 1-2 result for the Ferrari works team with the Olivier Gendebien, Phil Hill Ferrari 250 TRI/61 winning from the similar car driven by Mike Parkes and Willy Mairesse. A privately entered Ferrari GT 250 was third with an American-run Maserati Tipo 63 fighting it way back up to fourth, a full 22 laps behind the winning car.

== Regulations ==
The second year of the new FIA regulations did not see significant changes. The controversial windscreen rules regarding minimum height and width were also updated with a maximum slope, which closed the loophole that Maserati had cleverly worked around in the previous year.

For its part, race-organisers, the Automobile Club de l'Ouest (ACO) increased the maximum continuous driving stint up from 52 to 60 laps, given the faster speeds the cars were running at. However, the total driving time remained at 14 hours per driver. The time to complete the final lap time-limit was shortened from 30 to 20 minutes to reduce the incidents of slow or stationary cars out on the circuit trying to run down the clock to finish.

Scrutineering was moved from the Place des Jacobins in Le Mans city to the circuit. Finally, this year the ACO trialled a new IBM race-timing computer system (which had a few teething problems) and opened the first French automobile museum.

== Entries ==
With the dropping interest in the World Championship, from both manufacturers and fans, there were only 65 entries in total for the race. With two entries rejected, there were 55 starters and 8 reserves. It could be said that the modern Le Mans started in 1961 with the presence of significant mid- and rear-engined cars.

Official ‘works’ entries numbered 26, although Maserati and Aston Martin both gave support to their customer teams. Biggest team presence was the 5-strong Deutsch & Bonnet team, with 4-car entries from the Scuderia Ferrari, Porsche, Abarth and NART teams.

Category	Classes	Sports entries	GT entries	Total entries
Large-engines	5.0+, 5.0, 4.0, 3.0, 2.5L	11	10 (+2 reserves)	21
Medium-engines	2.0, 1.6, 1.3L	7 (+1 reserve)	11 (+1 reserves)	18
Small-engines	1.15, 1.0, 0.85L	16 (+3 reserves)	0	16
Total Cars		34 (+4 reserves)	21 (+3 reserves)	55 (+7 reserves)

Once again Ferrari dominated the entry list with 11 cars spreads across both the Sport and GT divisions. The racing division of the company was now entitled Societa Esercizio Fabbriche Automobili e Corse (SEFAC) and it arrived with four cars. Two were the latest iteration of the proven Testarossa race-winner, for their best endurance-racing partnership: Phil Hill / Olivier Gendebien as well as Willy Mairesse with Ferrari-debutante Mike Parkes. There was also the new, very fast, mid-engined Ferrari 246 SP which had already impressed in the season to be driven Ferrari's lead F1 drivers Wolfgang von Trips / Richie Ginther. The 2.4-litre V6 engine developed 270 bhp. The final works entry was a prototype of the new GT car being built for the upcoming 1962 rules changes. It still had the 3-litre V12 engine used in the Testarossa and was driven by Giancarlo Baghetti and Fernand Tavano (who had won the GT-division in the 1960 race as a Ferrari privateer). The North American Racing Team (NART) was also entered, with the TR61 car that had won the Sebring race. It would be driven by the very fast, young, Rodriguez brothers, Pedro and Ricardo

Maserati arrived with a new model, the Tipo 63, with a mid-mounted, 3-litre variant of the famous 250F V12 Grand Prix engine. It was said to be capable of 300 kp/h (185 mph) on the Mulsanne Straight. Two were entered by Briggs Cunningham, who had raced it at Sebring and a third for the Scuderia Serenissima, who had run it in the Targa Florio. Camoradi did not send its cars this year. Cunningham himself was entered with Bill Kimberley in a longtail 2-litre T60.

Representing Great Britain was Aston Martin and Cooper. Jaguar was a notable absentee for the first time since 1950. The Border Reivers, the only team to break up the Ferrari monopoly at the previous year's results, returned with their DBR1/300. This year Jim Clark was paired with two-time winner Ron Flockhart. His former team, Ecurie Ecosse, ran the new Cooper T57. Running with the 2.6-litre FPF Climax engine it was underpowered on the straights, but excellent handling kept it competitive.

Porsche arrived with three of their new RS61 cars, each with a different Flat-four engine. The 2-litre variant now developed 185 bhp with a top speed of 155 mph (250 kp/h). It was driven by Masten Gregory and Bob Holbert. The two coupés were driven by the Porsche F1 team drivers Hans Herrmann / Edgar Barth and Jo Bonnier/Dan Gurney.

Completing the 2-litre field, Triumph once again entered three cars in the Sports division, as its TR4 had not been homologated for GT racing as yet.

The smaller-engined classes were well supported once again, with Abarth, Austin Healey and OSCA taking on the dominant Deutsch et Bonnet cars. As well as the standard, reliable HBR-4 cars, DB also introduced its new mid-engined HBR-5 spyder for Vidilles/Moynet.

Six Abarth entries included four works cars. The little 701cc Fiat engine developed a mere 64 bhp. A special 850cc-variant (developing 73 bhp and doing 120 mph on the Mulsanne straight) was in the reserves to be driven by New Zealanders Denis Hulme/Angus Hyslop. OSCA arrived with one of their successful 750 Sport cars as a works entry and an up-engined 988cc entered by NART for the Index prizes.

Once again the GT division was dominated by Ferrari with seven privateer entries. Stirling Moss was back, with Graham Hill, this time in a Ferrari co-entered by Rob Walker and NART. This year, their main competition would come from the Aston Martin DB4s of John Ogier's new Essex Racing Team (who also ran a DBR1/300 in the Sports division) and French privateer Jean Kerguen. Re-styled by Zagato, they were the biggest cars in the field with their 3.7-litre engines.

Otherwise, the mid-range GT classes were rather limited. A pair of French AC Aces were the only entries in the 2-litre class, Lotus had the 1.3-litre category to itself with five Elites entered including two works cars. There was competition in the 1.6-litre class though, with Porsche up against Sunbeam returning to Le Mans after over 30 years away

Curiously, Chris Lawrence's Morgan 4+4 entry was rejected by the ACO because it looked, essentially, too old-fashioned and not meeting the ‘spirit of the race’.

== Practice ==
Over the April test weekend, the Ferrari 246 SP was fastest, three seconds ahead of Hill in the Testarossa and fully nine seconds from the Maserati Tipo 63s. The Ferrari 250 GT was fully 20 seconds faster than its Aston Martin competition. However, Jo Schlesser crashed one of the GTs, breaking his arm and leg, keeping him out of the race.

In official practice, Ginther in the 246 SP was again fastest. Mike Parkes, who had never driven a Testarossa before, was immediately on the pace with 4th fastest time.

== Race ==
=== Start ===
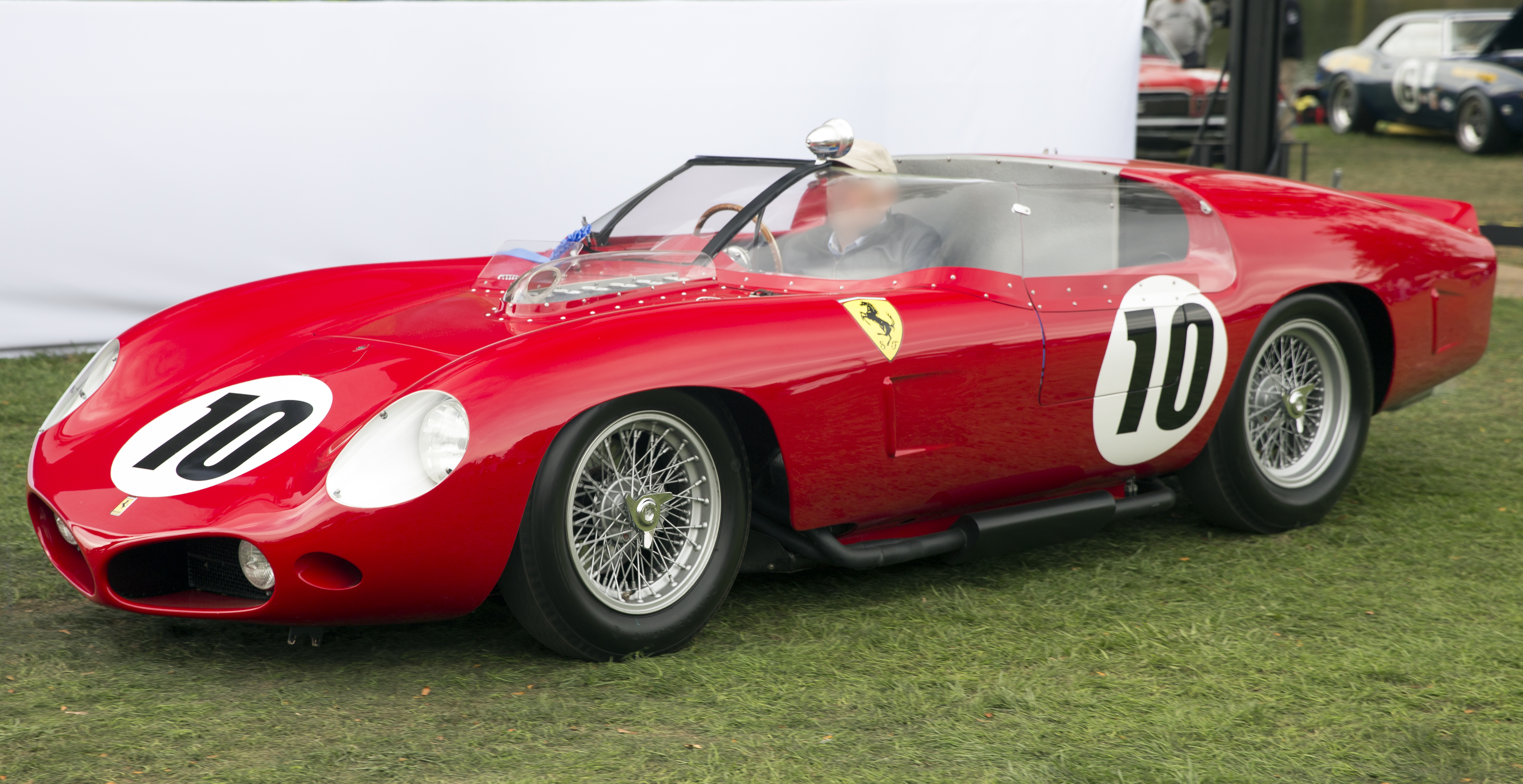
The winning Ferrari 250 TRI/61 of Gendebien and Hill

The day of the race started with light showers, but by the time 4pm came around the overcast conditions had dried out the circuit. Moss, as always, was quick but by dint of starting further up the grid, Jim Clark's Aston Martin was first car under the Dunlop bridge. Two of the last to get away were Mike Parkes’ Ferrari and Augie Pabst's Maserati. But at the end of the first lap, Ginther in the 246 SP led Hill's Testarossa, Hansgen's Maserati then Pedro Rodriguez in the NART Ferrari, Clark, Moss & Salvadori. Within five laps, Rodriguez had got to the front and together with Ginther and Hill they built a gap from the chasing pack, swapping places often. The first pitstops and driver-changes came after 90 minutes of racing. The 246SP was able to run up to 15 minutes longer before refuelling, therefore building up a bit of a lead.

The showers returned around 6pm, wet enough to make the track very slippery. Walt Hansgen went off at speed at Tertre Rouge, while running fourth. The impact broke his arm and cracked some vertebrae. Bill Halford, running 7th in the Ecosse Cooper soon after taking the wheel, went off at the Dunlop Curve, hitting the embankment at nearly 200 km/h (120 mph). The car rolled, throwing Halford out but he luckily escaped with just scratches and bruises. Then Bill McKay crashed the Ecosse Sprite at Maison Blanche also breaking his arm.

Stirling Moss & Graham Hill had been putting in incredible lap-times with their Ferrari GT, easily leading the GT division, but also ahead of the Aston Martin and Maserati prototypes. Moss even recorded the 7th fastest racing lap ever on the circuit. By 7pm they were running fifth overall.

At 8pm, after four hours and two pitstops, the race order was the Ferraris of von Trips, P.Rodriguez, P.Hill and Parkes. Salvadori was 5th, the last car on the lead lap. Then came the Ferrari GTs of Moss, Tavano and Noblet with Clark in 9th. The UDT Lotus was leading the Index of Performance, with von Trips in second .

=== Night ===
The rain continued into the early evening. Then about 10.30pm Ginther had to pit to have its lights fixed that cost them 10 minutes and several laps. This left Hill/Gendebien ahead of the rival Rodriguez brothers then their teammates Parkes/Mairesse. What prevented the race becoming a dull, repetitive procession was the inter-team rivalry between NART and the works team. Close racing in a damp night meant the lead changed repeatedly through the night. At 1am, after 9 hours, the two leading cars had done 123 laps, Parkes-Mairesse 3 laps back, then Ginther/von Trips, Moss/Hill and Salvadori/Maggs all on 118 laps. Seventh was the Pabst/Thompson Maserati two laps further back.

However, at 1.30am the Walker Ferrari was nobbled by a dislodged fan blade slicing a radiator hose, ending its fine run. The Ferrari GT prototype had been running very well, staying in the top ten, stalking the Walker 250 GT, however in the early hours of Sunday it was retired with engine issues. Not long before that Clark's Aston Martin had blown its engine on the Mulsanne straight while he was running 5th. The Essex Aston Martin of Salvadori/Maggs moved up to fifth place.

At 4am, the Rodriguez brothers led from the three works Ferraris, then the Aston Martin and the recovering Maserati. Noblet's Ferrari GT was 7th, ahead of Tavano's GT prototype, the leading Porsche (Bonnier/Gurney) and Trintignant's GT. The privateer DB of Masson/Armagnac was leading the Index of Performance from the Contrillier/Foitek Abarth.

=== Morning ===
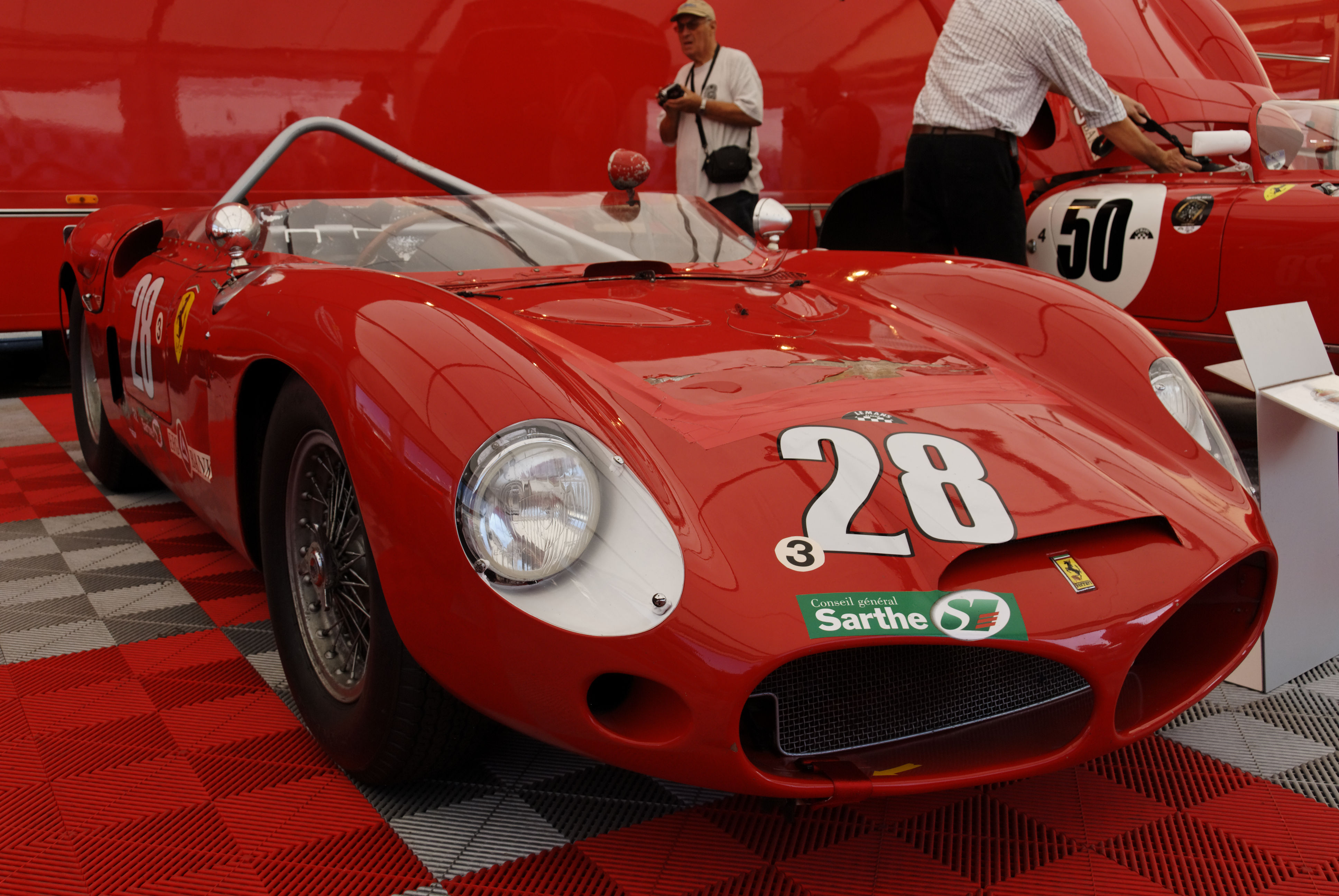
The Ferrari 246 SP driven by Ginther/Von Trips, which retired after running out of fuel.

By dawn the track was drying again. But at 7.30am, the NART car came into the pits with a bad misfire, and it took half an hour to fix. Von Trips and Ginther had driven hard after their delay and managed to get back up to second place, four laps behind Hill/Gendebien. But then at 8am, another bad miscalculation by the Ferrari team ran von Trips out of fuel in consecutive Le Mans. The Essex Aston Martin had been lapping consistently, moving up to 4th when the Ferrari retired. However it was retired mid-morning with a split, leaking, oil tank.

Another hard pursuit, this time by the NART Ferrari trying to make up their lost half hour, kept the spectators interested. By midday they had overtaken Mairesse and was in second. But the strain finally told on the engine and at 2pm, with just 2 hours to go, the Rodriguez’ Ferrari crawled into the pits with terminal engine issues. Bonnier and Gurney had been running a strong 5th but became the first Porsche retirement when its engine broke after 12.30pm. The French Aston Martin GT had been running well, 3rd in class behind the Ferraris and 9th overall. But with an hour to go, at its last pitstop, a mechanic left a spanner in the engine and it short-circuited the battery.

=== Finish and post-race ===
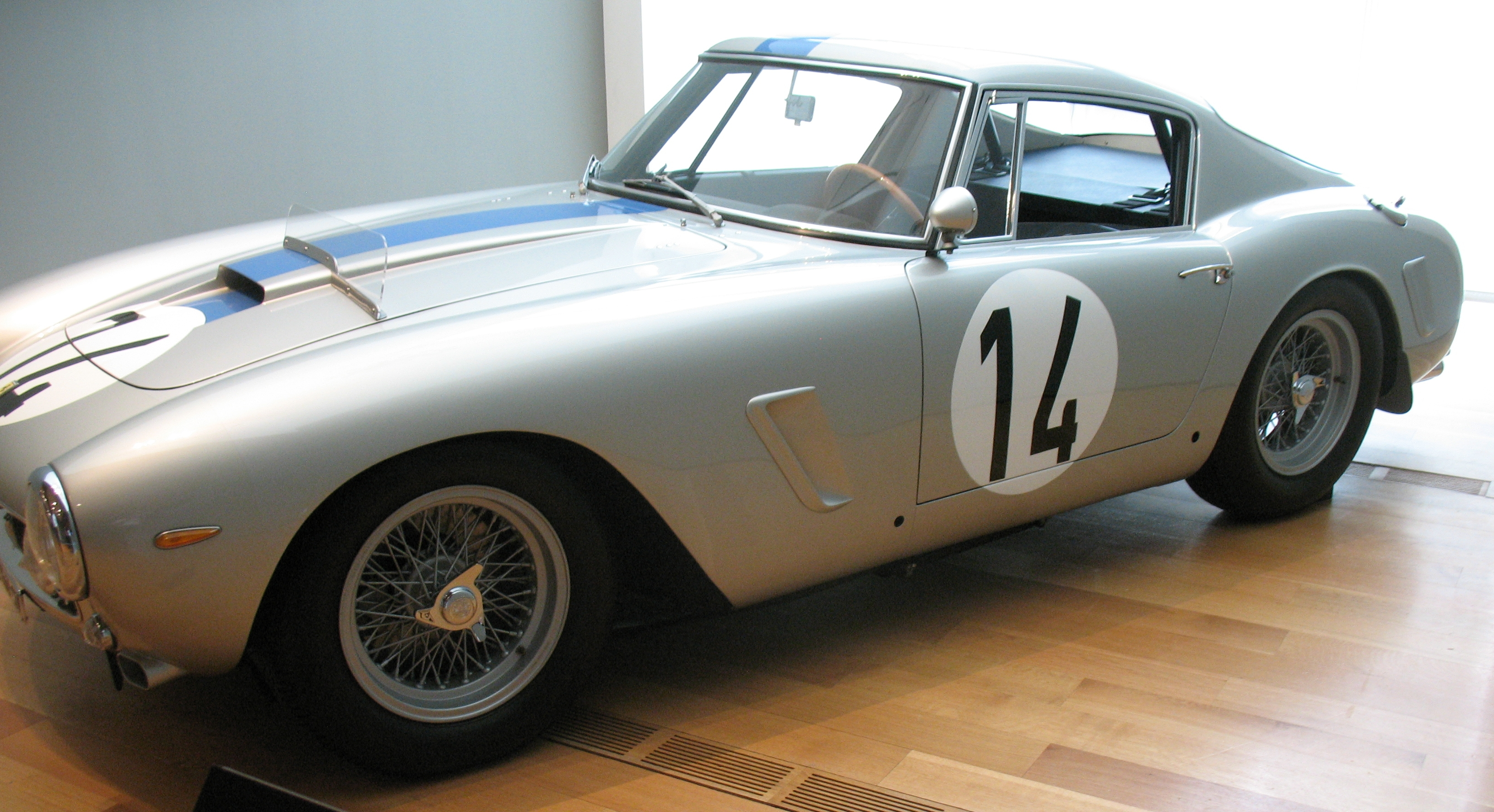
The Ferrari 250 GT which placed third outright and won the GT 3000 class in the hand of Pierre Noblet and Jean Guichet.

From there on, the team Ferraris held station with the race finishing under soft rain. Hill and Gendebien, the 1958 winners, won again finishing three laps (37.86 km (23.53 mi)) ahead of their teammates Parkes/Mairesse. Third place, and thirteen laps further back, was the privateer Ferrari GT of Noblet/Guichet ahead of the Pabst/Thompson Maserati. Porsche had a better race this year, with the all-American Gregory/Holbert works car finishing an excellent 5th, after consistently running in the top-10 from Saturday night. The Herrmann/Barth car came in 7th, while the Porsche GT of Linge/Pon was 10th, easily winning its class.

Briggs Cunningham had an uncomplicated race in the 2-litre Maserati, never missing a beat as it finished 8th. In fact, it was the car that spent the shortest time in the pits during the race. Triumph again staged a formation finish, however this year its three cars were classified, the best one finishing 9th. In the competitive 850cc class, it was the two ‘Kiwis’ in the Abarth 850 that beat the chasing DBs home by a clear six laps. The Foitek/Condrillier Abarth had the great misfortune to break an oil-pipe on the penultimate lap preventing the Italian marque claiming a 1-2 class finish.

This 5th win for Ferrari put it on equal footing with Bentley and Jaguar for most victories. The win contributed to a significant year for Ferrari. Bandini and Scarfiotti won the final round at the new race at Pescara securing the World Championship. Baghetti went on a purple streak winning his first three F1 races and becoming the only driver to win an F1 World Championship race in his first opportunity, at Reims. Ferrari won the F1 Constructor's Championship and Phil Hill and Wolfgang von Trips were the two contenders for the Driver's title that was sadly decided when von Trips was killed at Monza.

This was also the last Le Mans for Stirling Moss who had a career-ending crash at Goodwood early in the next year. In his ten appearances he never won, but his speed and competitiveness was always a highlight for the spectators.

The Index of Performance again went to a DB, but not the works team. Instead it was the small Equipe Chardonnet which won the prize. The special Sunbeam coupé won the Index of Thermal Efficiency, and the company promptly produced a short run of the “Harrington Le Mans” model to capitalise on its success.

This was the last year of the Sportscar World Championship (in its current form) as the FIA had decreed that going forward, the Championship would be based around GT cars.

== Official results ==
=== Finishers ===
Results taken from Quentin Spurring's book, officially licensed by the ACO Class winners are in Bold text.

Pos	Class	No	Team	Drivers	Chassis	Engine	Laps
1	S 3.0	**10**	(Italy) **SEFAC Ferrari**	(Belgium) **Olivier Gendebien** (United States) **Phil Hill**	Ferrari 250 TRI/61	Ferrari 3.0L V12	333
2	S 3.0	11	(Italy) SEFAC Ferrari	(Belgium) Willy Mairesse (United Kingdom) Mike Parkes	Ferrari 250 TRI/61	Ferrari 3.0L V12	330
3	**GT**; **3.0**	**14**	(Belgium) **P. Noblet** (private entrant)	(Belgium) **Pierre Noblet** (France) **Jean Guichet**	Ferrari 250 GT SWB	Ferrari 3.0L V12	317
4	S 3.0	7	(United States) Briggs Cunningham	(United States) Augie Pabst (United States) Dick Thompson	Maserati Tipo 63	Maserati 3.0L V12	311
5	**S** **2.0**	**33**	(West Germany) **Porsche KG**	(United States) **Masten Gregory** (United States) **Bob Holbert**	Porsche RS61 Spyder	Porsche 1967cc F4	309
6	GT; 3.0	20	(Belgium) Equipe Nationale Belge	(United States) Bob Grossman (Belgium) André Pilette	Ferrari 250 GT SWB	Ferrari 3.0L V12	309
7	S 2.0	32	(West Germany) Porsche KG	(Germany) Edgar Barth (Germany) Hans Herrmann	Porsche RS61 Coupé	Porsche 1606cc F4	306
8	S 2.0	24	(United States) B.S. Cunningham	(United States) Briggs Cunningham (United States) Bill Kimberley	Maserati Tipo 60	Maserati 1989cc S4	303
9	S 2.0	27	(United Kingdom) Standard Triumph Ltd	(United Kingdom) Peter Bolton (United Kingdom) Keith Ballisat	Triumph TR4S	Triumph 1985cc S4	284
10	**GT**; **1.6**	**36**	(West Germany) **Porsche KG**	(Germany) **Herbert Linge** (Netherlands) **Ben Pon**	Porsche 356 B Carrera GTL Abarth	Porsche 1588cc S4	284
11	S 2.0	26	(United Kingdom) Standard Triumph Ltd	(United Kingdom) Les Leston (Netherlands) Rob Slotemaker	Triumph TR4S	Triumph 1985cc S4	279
12	**GT**; **1.3**	**38**	(United Kingdom) **Team Lotus Engineering**	(United Kingdom) **Trevor Taylor** (United Kingdom) **Bill Allen**	Lotus Elite	Coventry Climax 1216cc S4	268
13	GT; 1.3	40	(France) Ecurie Edger	(France) Bernard Kosselek (France) Pierre Messenez	Lotus Elite	Coventry Climax 1216cc S4	267
14	**S** **850**	**60** (reserve)	(Italy) **Abarth & Cie**	(New Zealand) **Denny Hulme** (New Zealand) **Angus Hyslop**	Abarth 850S	Fiat 847cc S4	263
15	S 2.0	25	(United Kingdom) Standard Triumph Ltd	(France) Marcel Becquart (United States) Mike Rothschild	Triumph TR4S	Triumph 1985cc S4	262
16	GT; 1.6	34	(United Kingdom) Sunbeam Talbot	(United Kingdom) Peter Harper (United Kingdom) Peter Procter	Sunbeam Alpine Harrington	Sunbeam 1592cc S4	261
17	**GT**; **2.0**	**28**	(France) **Equipe Chardonnet**	(France) **Jean-Claude Magne** (France) **Georges Alexandrovitch**	AC Ace	Bristol 1971cc S6	261
18	S 850	53	(France) Automobiles; Deutsch et Bonnet	(France) Gérard Laureau (France) Robert Bouharde	D.B. HBR-4 Spyder	Panhard 702cc F2	257
19	S 850	45	(France) Automobiles; Deutsch et Bonnet	(France) André Moynet (France) Jean-Claude Vidilles	D.B. HBR-5 Spyder	Panhard 848cc F2	243
20	S 850	48	(France) Automobiles; Deutsch et Bonnet	(France) André Guilhaudin (France) Jean-François Jaeger	D.B. HBR-4	Panhard 848cc F2	243
21	S 850	47	(France) Automobiles; Deutsch et Bonnet	(France) Edgar Rollin (France) René Bartholoni	D.B. HBR-4	Panhard 848cc F2	239
22	S 850	52	(France) Automobiles; Deutsch et Bonnet	(France) Jean-Claude Caillaud (France) Robert Mougin	D.B. HBR-4 Rallye	Panhard 848cc F2	237

=== Did not finish ===
Pos	Class	No	Team	Drivers	Chassis	Engine	Laps	Reason
DNF	S 3.0	17	(United States) North American Racing Team	(Mexico) Pedro Rodríguez (Mexico) Ricardo Rodríguez	Ferrari 250 TRI/61	Ferrari 3.0L V12	305	engine (23hr)
DNF	GT; 4.0	1	(France) J. Kerguen (private entrant)	(France) Jean Kerguen (France) "Franc" (Jacques Dewez)	Aston Martin DB4 GT Zagato	Aston Martin 3.7L S6	286	battery (24hr)
DNF	S 2.0	30	(West Germany) **Porsche KG**	(Sweden) Joakim ‘Jo’ Bonnier (United States) Dan Gurney	Porsche RS61 Coupé	Porsche 1679cc F4	262	engine (23hr)
DNF	GT; 1.6	37	(France) A. Veuillet (private entrant)	(France) Pierre Monneret (France) Robert Buchet	Porsche 356 B Carrera GTL Abarth	Porsche 1588cc S4	261	engine (23hr)
DNF	S 850	55	(Italy) Abarth & Cie	(France) Paul Condrillier (Switzerland) Karl Foitek	Abarth 700S	Fiat 701cc S4	255	oil pipe (24hr)
DNF	GT; 3.0	21	(United Kingdom) Ecurie Chiltern	(United Kingdom) John Bekaert (United Kingdom) Richard “Dickie” Stoop	Austin-Healey 3000	BMC 2.9L S6	254	engine (23hr)
DNF	S 3.0	4	(United Kingdom) Essex Racing Team	(United Kingdom) Roy Salvadori (South Africa) Tony Maggs	Aston Martin DBR1/300	Aston Martin 3.0L S6	243	split oil tank (19hr)
DNF	S 2.5	23	(Italy) SEFAC Ferrari	(Germany) Wolfgang von Trips (United States) Richie Ginther	Ferrari 246 SP	Ferrari 2.4L V6	231	out of fuel (17hr)
DNF	S 850	54	(France) R. Masson (private entrant)	(France) Roger Masson (France) Paul Armagnac	D.B. HBR-4	Panhard 702cc F2	208	engine (20hr)
DNF	GT; 1.3	39	(United Kingdom) Team Lotus Engineering	(United Kingdom) John ‘Mac’ Wyllie (United Kingdom) David Buxton	Lotus Elite	Coventry Climax 1216cc S4	193	overheating (20hr)
DNF	S 3.0	12	(Italy) SEFAC Ferrari	(France) Fernand Tavano (Italy) Giancarlo Baghetti	Ferrari 250 GT SWB	Ferrari 3.0L V12	163	engine (13hr)
DNF	GT; 3.0	16	(Italy) Scuderia Serenissima	(France) Maurice Trintignant (Italy) Carlo Maria Abate	Ferrari 250 GT SWB	Ferrari 3.0L V12	162	transmission (13hr)
DNF	S 3.0	5	(United Kingdom) Border Reivers	(United Kingdom) Jim Clark (United Kingdom) Ron Flockhart	Aston Martin DBR1/300	Aston Martin 3.0L S6	132	clutch (11hr)
DSQ	GT; 1.6	35	(United Kingdom) Sunbeam Talbot	(United Kingdom) Peter Jopp (United Kingdom) Paddy Hopkirk	Sunbeam Alpine	Sunbeam 1592cc S4	130	premature refill (12hr)
DNF	S 1.0	43	(United States) North American Racing Team	(United States) Ed Hugus (United States) David Cunningham	O.S.C.A. Sport 1000	OSCA 988c S4	125	clutch (13hr)
DNF	S 850	8	(Italy) Scuderia Serenissima	(Italy) Piero Frescobaldi (Italy) Raffaele Cammarota	Abarth 700 S Spider	Fiat 701cc S4	124	suspension (12hr)
DNF	GT; 3.0	18	(United States) North American Racing Team (United Kingdom) Rob Walker Racing Team	(United Kingdom) Stirling Moss (United Kingdom) Graham Hill	Ferrari 250 GT SWB	Ferrari 3.0L V12	121	water hose (10hr)
DNF	GT; 2.0	29	(Switzerland) Ecurie Lausannoise	(Switzerland) André Wicky (Switzerland) Edgar Berney	AC Ace	Bristol 1971cc S6	115	overheating (11hr)
DNF	S 850	56	(Italy) Abarth & Cie	(Italy) Giancarlo Sala (Italy) Giancarlo Rigamonti	Abarth 700S	Fiat 701cc S4	111	dynamo (13hr)
DNF	S 850	51	(United Kingdom) UDT Laystall Racing Team	(United Kingdom) Cliff Allison (United Kingdom) Mike McKee	Lotus Elite	Coventry Climax FWMC 742cc S4	102	engine (11hr)
DNF	GT; 1.3	41	(France) Ecurie Los Amigos	(France) Jean-François Malle (United Kingdom) Robin Carnegie	Lotus Elite	Coventry Climax 1216cc S4	86	out of fuel (10hr)
DNF	S 850	50	(Italy) Automobili OSCA	(France) Jean Laroche (United Kingdom) Colin Davis	O.S.C.A. Sport 750	OSCA 746cc S4	85	overheating (10hr)
DNF	GT; 3.0	19	(United States) North American Racing Team	(United States) George Arents (United States) George Reed	Ferrari 250 GT SWB	Ferrari 3.0L V12	76	electrical (7hr)
DNF	S 1.0	42	(United Kingdom) Donald Healey Motor Company	(United States) John K. Colgate Jr. (Australia) Paul Hawkins	Austin-Healey Sebring Sprite	BMC 994cc S4	64	engine (8hr)
DNF	GT; 3.0	15	(Belgium) Ecurie Francorchamps	(Belgium) Lucien Bianchi (Belgium) Georges Berger	Ferrari 250 GT SWB	Ferrari 3.0L V12	60	clutch (7hr)
DNF	S 3.0	9	(Italy) Scuderia Serenissima	(Italy) Ludovico Scarfiotti (Italy) Nino Vaccarella	Maserati Tipo 63	Maserati 3.0L V12	53	engine (7hr)
DNF	S 1.0	46	(United Kingdom) Ecurie Ecosse	(United Kingdom) Ninian Sanderson (United Kingdom) Alan McKay	Austin-Healey Sebring Sprite	BMC 994cc S4	40	accident (4hr)
DNF	S 3.0	22	(United Kingdom) Ecurie Ecosse	(United Kingdom) Tommy Dickson (United Kingdom) Bruce Halford	Cooper T57 ‘Monaco’	Coventry Climax 2.6L S4	32	accident (3hr)
DNF	S 3.0	6	(United States) B.S. Cunningham	(United States) Walt Hansgen (New Zealand) Bruce McLaren	Maserati Tipo 63	Maserati 3.0L V12	31	accident (3hr)
DNF	GT; 4.0	3	(United Kingdom) Essex Racing Team	(Australia) Lex Davison (Australia) Bib Stillwell	Aston Martin DB4 GT Zagato	Aston Martin 3.7L S6	25	engine (3hr)
DNF	GT; 4.0	2	(United Kingdom) Essex Racing Team	(United Kingdom) Jack Fairman (France) Bernard Consten	Aston Martin DB4 GT Zagato	Aston Martin 3.7L S6	22	engine (3hr)
DNF	S 850	49	(Italy) Abarth & Cie	(Italy) Teodoro Zeccoli (France) Jean Vinatier	Abarth 700 S Spider	Fiat 701cc S4	15	accident (2hr)
DNF	S 2.0	58 (reserve)	(United Kingdom) T. Lund (private entrant)	(United Kingdom) Ted Lund (South Africa) Bob Olthoff	MG MGA Twin Cam	MG 1762cc S4	14	engine (2hr)

=== Did not start ===
Pos	Class	No	Team	Drivers	Chassis	Engine	Reason
DNS	GT; 1.3	31	(United Kingdom) Team Lotus Engineering	(United Kingdom) Trevor Taylor (United Kingdom) Peter Arundell	Lotus 19	Coventry Climax 1964cc S4	Withdrawn
DNS	S 1.0	44	(Belgium) Equipe Nationale Belge	(Belgium) Claude Dubois (France) Gerhard Langlois van Ophem	Abarth 1000S	Fiat 982cc S4	Withdrawn
DNS	GT; 3.0	57 (reserve)	(France) R. de Lageneste (private entrant)	(France) Roger de Lageneste (France) “Loustel” (Pierre Dumay)	Ferrari 250 GT SWB	Ferrari 3.0L V12	Not required
DNS	S 850	59 (reserve)	(France) M. Martin (private entrant)	(France) Maurice Martin (France) Jean-François Jaeger	D.B. HBR	Panhard 851cc F2	Not required
DNS	GT; 3.0	61 (reserve)	(United Kingdom) Cambridge Racing	(United Kingdom) Jim Clark (United Kingdom) Trevor Taylor	Austin-Healey 3000	BMC 2.9L S6	Not required
DNS	GT; 1.3	62 (reserve)	(France) M. Porthault (private entrant)	(France) Maurice Porthault (France) Jean Devos	Lotus Elite	Coventry Climax 1216cc S4	Not required
DNS	S 850	63 (reserve)	(France) C. Faucher (private entrant)	(Italy) Christian Faucher (France) J-J Petit	BMW 700S	BMW 700cc S4	Not required

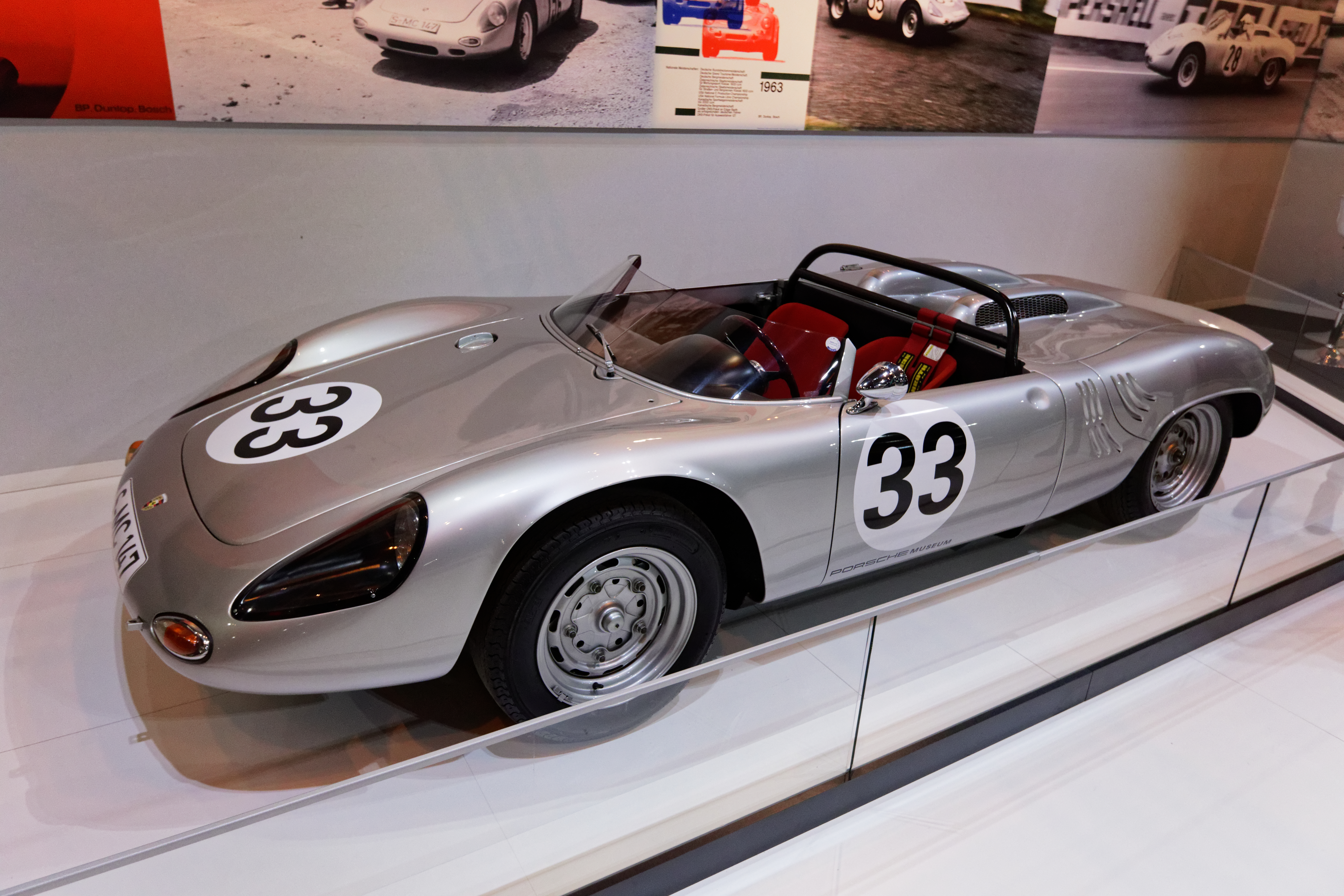
The winner of the Sports 2000 class, a works Porsche 718 RS61 Spyder driven by Gregory and Holbert

=== Class winners ===
Class	Winners!				
Sports 4000	not eligible		Grand Touring 4000	no finishers	
Sports 3000	#10 Ferrari 250 TRI/61	Gendebien / Hill	Grand Touring 3000	#14 Ferrari 250 GT SWB	Noblet / Guichet
Sports 2500	no finishers		Grand Touring 2500	no entrants	
Sports 2000	#33 Porsche RS61 Spyder	Gregory / Holbert	Grand Touring 2000	#28 AC Ace	Magne / Alexandrovitch
Sports 1600	no entrants		Grand Touring 1600	#36 Porsche 356 B Carrera GTL Abarth	Linge / Pon
Sports 1300	no entrants		Grand Touring 1300	#38 Lotus Elite	Taylor / Allen
Sports 1150	no entrants		Grand Touring 1150	no entrants	
Sports 1000	no finishers		Grand Touring 1000	no entrants	
Sports 850	#60 Abarth 850S	Hulme / Hyslop	Grand Touring 850	not eligible	

=== Index of Thermal Efficiency ===
Pos	Class	No	Team	Drivers	Chassis	Score
1	GT; 1.6	34	(United Kingdom) Sunbeam Talbot	(United Kingdom) Peter Harper (United Kingdom) Peter Procter	Sunbeam Alpine Harrington	1.07
2=	GT; 1.3	40	(France) Ecurie Edger	(France) Bernard Kosselek (France) Pierre Messenez	Lotus Elite	1.03
2=	S 850	48	(France) Automobiles; Deutsch et Bonnet	(France) André Guilhaudin (France) Jean-François Jaeger	D.B. HBR-4	1.03
4	S 2.0	32	(West Germany) Porsche KG	(Germany) Edgar Barth (Germany) Hans Herrmann	Porsche RS61 Coupé	1.02
5=	S 850	47	(France) Automobiles; Deutsch et Bonnet	(France) Edgar Rollin (France) René Bartholoni	D.B. HBR-4	0.99
5=	GT; 1.6	36	(West Germany) Porsche KG	(Germany) Herbert Linge (Netherlands) Ben Pon	Porsche 356 B Carrera GTL Abarth	0.99
7=	S 850	60	(Italy) Abarth & Cie	(New Zealand) Denny Hulme (New Zealand) Angus Hyslop	Abarth 850S	0.98
7=	S 2.0	33	(West Germany) Porsche KG	(United States) Masten Gregory (United States) Bob Holbert	Porsche RS61 Spyder	0.98
9	S 3.0	10	(Italy) SEFAC Ferrari	(Belgium) Olivier Gendebien (United States) Phil Hill	Ferrari 250 TRI/61	0.93

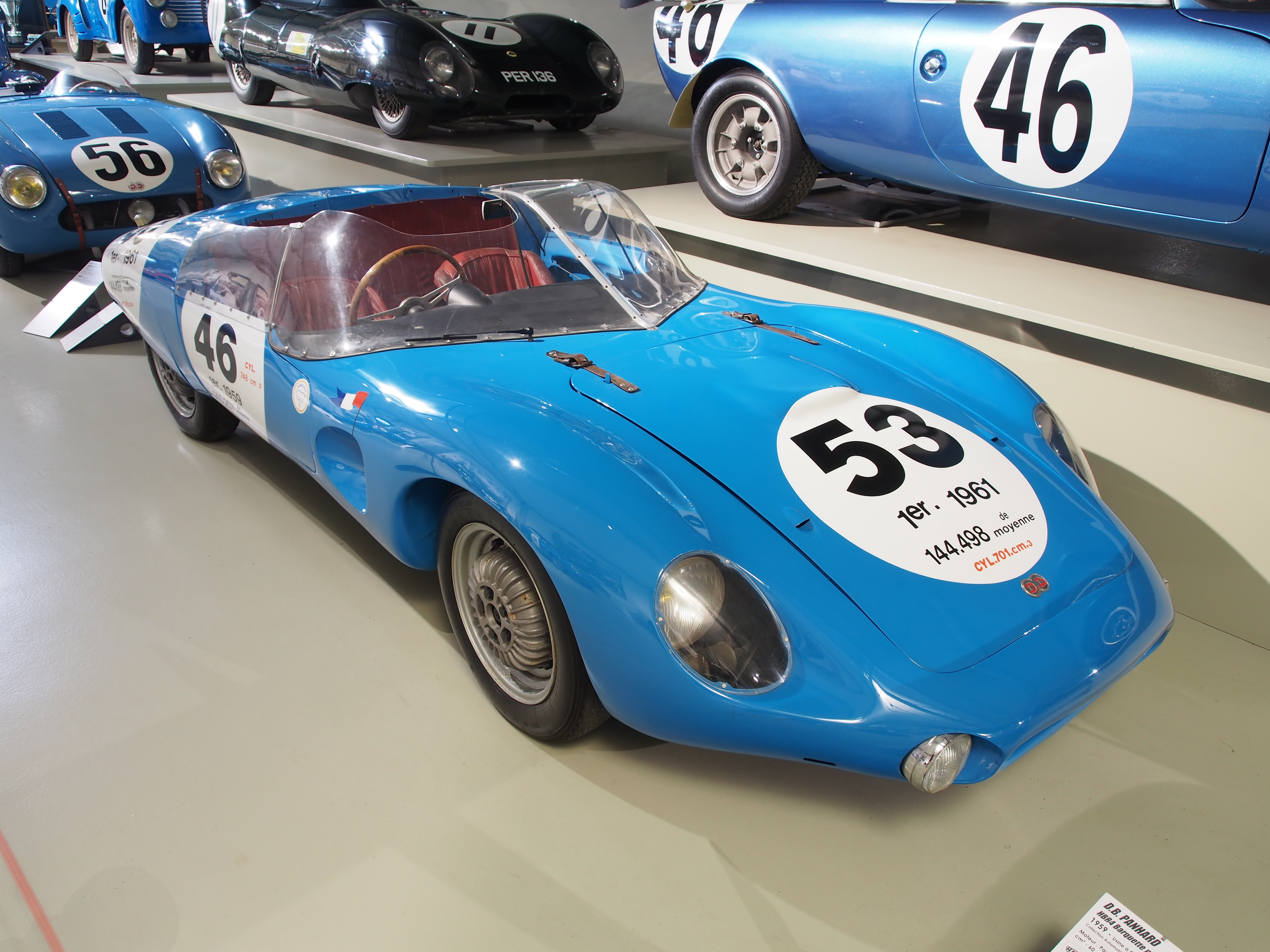
Winner of the Index of Performance, a DB Panhard HBR4 driven by Laureau/Bouharde.

=== Index of Performance ===
Pos	Class	No	Team	Drivers	Chassis	Score
1	S 850	53	(France) Automobiles; Deutsch et Bonnet	(France) Gérard Laureau (France) Robert Bouharde	D.B. HBR-4 Spyder	1.265
2	S 3.0	10	(Italy) SEFAC Ferrari	(Belgium) Olivier Gendebien (United States) Phil Hill	Ferrari 250 TRI/61	1.228
3=	S 850	60	(Italy) Abarth & Cie	(New Zealand) Denny Hulme (New Zealand) Angus Hyslop	Abarth 850S	1.219
3=	S 2.0	32	(West Germany) Porsche KG	(Germany) Edgar Barth (Germany) Hans Herrmann	Porsche RS61 Coupé	1.219
5	S 3.0	11	(Italy) SEFAC Ferrari	(Belgium) Willy Mairesse (United Kingdom) Mike Parkes	Ferrari 250 TRI/61	1.218
6	S 2.0	33	(West Germany) Porsche KG	(United States) Masten Gregory (United States) Bob Holbert	Porsche RS61 Spyder	1.194
7=	GT; 3.0	14	(Belgium) P. Noblet (private entrant)	(Belgium) Pierre Noblet (France) Jean Guichet	Ferrari 250 GT SWB	1.168
7=	S 2.0	24	(United States) B.S. Cunningham	(United States) Briggs Cunningham (United States) Bill Kimberley	Maserati Tipo 60	1.168
9	S 3.0	7	(United States) B.S. Cunningham	(United States) Augie Pabst (United States) Dick Thompson	Maserati Tipo 63	1.146
10	GT; 3.0	20	(Belgium) Equipe Nationale Belge	(United States) Bob Grossman (Belgium) André Pilette	Ferrari 250 GT SWB	1.138

- Note: Only the top ten positions are included in this set of standings. A score of 1.00 means meeting the minimum distance for the car, and a higher score is exceeding the nominal target distance.

=== Statistics ===
Taken from Quentin Spurring's book, officially licensed by the ACO

- Fastest lap in practice – Ginther, #23 Ferrari 246 SP – 4m 02.8s; 199.59 km/h (124.02 mph)
- Fastest lap – Ricardo Rodriguez, #17 Ferrari 250 TRI/61 – 3:59.5secs; 201.20 km/h (125.02 mph)
- Distance – 4,476.58 km (2,781.62 mi)
- Winner's average speed – 186.53 km/h (115.90 mph)

=== FIA World Sportscar Championship: post-race standings ===
Pos	Championship	Points
1	(Italy) Ferrari	24 (30)
2	(Italy) Maserati	14
3	(West Germany) Porsche	11

Citations
