= 1961 Targa Florio =

The 45° Targa Florio took place on 30 April 1961, on the Circuito Piccolo delle Madonie, (Sicily, Italy). It was the second round of the F.I.A. World Sports Car Championship, and third round of the FIA GT Cup.

== Report ==
=== Entry ===
The event attracted fewer cars than in previous seasons, with 64 racing cars registered for this event, instead of the 78 in 1960. 57 of the 64 arrived for practice. Of these, 54 qualified for, and started the race.

Ferrari never had won a Formula One Constructor Championship, losing to British cars since it was introduced in 1958, but once again was the reigning World Sportscar Champion - barely, though. In the 1960 World Sportscar Championship Maranello had won only 2 of 5 events, one of them Le Mans which requires strong engines, while the small capacity Porsche won also two events and a second place, with the tie breaker having been the amount of third places. Of the four proper Targa races from 1956 (Non-Championship) to 1960, Ferrari had won only in 1958 with the 3-liter V12 Testa Rossa mounted in the front, with the nimble mid-rear engine 1500cc Porsche 550 and 718 winning three. Having lost in 1959, Ferrari in 1960 entered the lighter V6-powered Dino 246S with 2.4 liter engine size, but Porsche had upgraded its flat-4 DOHC Type 547 Fuhrmann engine to 1.6 liter and took a third win.

For 1961, Ferrari finally adopted the mid-engine layout, putting a Dino-V6 behind (Posteriore) the driver both in F1 and in some sportscars, which were designated SP. Ferrari entered two of their 2.4 litre mid-V6 Ferrari 246 SP and a traditional 3-liter front-V12 250 TRI 61 for their squad of drivers; Willy Mairesse, Ricardo Rodríguez, Wolfgang von Trips, Olivier Gendebien, Phil Hill and Richie Ginther. As in 1960, there were no other factory entrants in the S3.0 class. The main opposition would come once again from the works Porsche 718 RS 61s of Hans Herrmann & Edgar Barth, Jo Bonnier & Dan Gurney, Graham Hill and Stirling Moss. Despite the fact that these were smaller engined cars and less powerful, they had beaten Ferrari in the last two Targa Florios. This time, Porsche enlarged the engine some more, conservative 1700cc for the No. 132 car of the German drivers, and nearly the maximum of the S2.0 class with 1966cc in the two other 718.

=== Race ===
At the start, Moss in the No. 136 Porsche took an immediate lead, which would eventually build up to around 90 seconds, with his team-mate Bonnier in second place. The leading Ferrari was No. 162 of von Trips, it seemed the Ferrari 246 SP just couldn’t match the overall performance of the nimble Porsches The other V6 Ferrari of Phil Hill and Ginther suffered an accident on the very first lap, and was one of 24 cars that didn’t reach half distance. The V12 works Ferrari was also out early.

After a few laps, Moss would have to hand the car over to Graham Hill. Despite having finished 5th in 1960, and Porsche testing a lot before Targas like Mercedes did in 1955, Hill’s inexperience of the event was coming into play. While he stayed out of trouble and had a decent pace, it wasn't fast enough. The Ferrari of von Trips and Gendebien took the overall lead by nearly 80 seconds, while Bonnier/Gurney fell back to third. Still, Hill had done his job, he completed a couple of laps and handed the car back to the 1955 winner Moss for the remainder of the race.

Moss picked up the pace quite dramatically and was soon right back up with the leading Ferrari which also was the last remaining one, with three works Porsche in the hunt. Thus, Moss wasn’t going to be stopped and was soon back in the lead. In reply, von Trips set an amazing fastest lap, with an average speed of 67.019 mph. Still, heading into the final lap, he followed Moss in the running order. Moss headed into the last lap with a lead of more than a minute over the Ferrari. By this point he had covered more than 440 miles, when the differential failed. He was just a few miles from victory, but the enlarged engine and his pace was too much for the drivetrain.

The 2.4 liter Ferrari of von Trips/Gendebien inherited the lead, to take the victory, completing 10 laps, covering 447.388 miles in just under 7½ hours of racing, averaging a speed of 64.272 mph. Second and third place went to the other works Porsche 718 RS 61. The 2.0 liter of Bonnier and Gurney finished second, albeit over 4½ mins adrift. The podium was completed by the smaller 1.7 liter works Porsche of Herrmann and Barth who were a further 12 mins behind.

== Official Classification ==
Class Winners are in Bold text.

Pos	No	Class	Driver		Entrant	Chassis	Laps	Reason Out
1st	**162**	**S3.0**	(West Germany) **Wolfgang von Trips**	(Belgium) **Olivier Gendebien**	**SEFAC Ferrari**	**Ferrari 246 SP**	**6hr 57:39.4, 10**	
2nd	**134**	**S2.0**	(Sweden) **Jo Bonnier**	(United States) **Dan Gurney**	**Porsche KG**	**Porsche 718 RS 61**	**7hr 02:03.5, 10**	
3rd	132	S2.0	(West Germany) Hans Herrmann	(East Germany) Edgar Barth	Porsche KG	Porsche 718 RS 61	7hr 14:14.0, 10	
4th	152	S3.0	(Italy) Nino Vaccarella	(France) Maurice Trintignant	Scuderia Serenissima	Maserati Tipo 63	7hr 28:49.3, 10	
5th	158	S3.0	(Italy) Umberto Maglioli	(Italy) Giorgio Scarlatti	Scuderia Serenissima	Maserati Tipo 63	7hr 40:04.2, 10	
6th	**92**	**GT2.5**	(West Germany) **Paul-Ernst Strähle**	(Italy) **Antonio Pucci**	**Porsche KG**	**Porsche 356B Carrera Abarth GTL**	**7hr 48:25.8, 10**	
7th	96	GT2.5	(West Germany) Herbert Linge	(West Germany) Huschke von Hanstein	Porsche KG	Porsche 356B Carrera Abarth GTL	7hr 50:53.5, 10	
8th	**38**	**GT1.3**	(France) **José Rosinki**	(France) **Bernard Consten**	**José Rosinki**	**Alfa Romeo Giulietta Sprint Zagato**	**7hr 59:08.0, 10**	
9th	4	GT1.3	(Italy) Vito Coco	(Italy) Sand	Scuderia Etna	Alfa Romeo Giulietta Sprint Zagato	8hr 06:14.0, 10	
10th	30	GT1.3	(Italy) “Kim”	(Italy) “Tom”	Scuderia Sant’Ambroeus	Alfa Romeo Giulietta Sprint Zagato	8hr 13:54.0, 10	
11th	10	GT1.3	(Italy) Baldassare Taormina	(Italy) Pasquale Tacci	Baldassare Taormina	Alfa Romeo Giulietta Sprint Zagato	8hr 06:48.0, 10	
12th	18	GT1.3	(West Germany) Hans Bauer	(Italy) Roberto Sgorbati	Scuderia Sant’Ambroeus	Alfa Romeo Giulietta Sprint Zagato	10	
13th	26	GT1.3	(Italy) Emanuele Trapani	(Italy) Bartolomeo Donato	Balarm	Alfa Romeo Giulietta Sprint Speciale	10	
14th	34	GT1.3	(Italy) Enzo Buzzetti	(Italy) Renzo Sinibaldi	Montegrappa	Alfa Romeo Giulietta Sprint Zagato	10	
15th	**70**	**S1.0**	(Italy) **Umberto Bini**	(Italy) **Giancarlo Riagmonti**	**Scuderia Sant’Ambroeus**	**Osca S1000**	**10**	
16th	12	GT1.3	(Italy) Giuseppe Grasso	(Italy) Vito Sabbia	Scuderia Etna	Alfa Romeo Giulietta Sprint Zagato	10	
17th	92	GT2.5	(Italy) Giulio Cabianca	(Italy) Elio Zagato	Scuderia Sant’Ambroeus	Lancia Flaminia Sport Zagato	10	
18th	98	GT2.5	(Italy) Franco Lisitano	(Italy) Benedetto Catano	San Rizzo	Fiat 8V	10	
19th	56	S1.0	(Italy) Massimo Natili	(Italy) Giuseppe Cucchiarelli	Alto Lazio	Giaur Giannini 1000	10	
NC	16	GT1.3	(Italy) Pietro Laureati	(Italy) Domenico Santoleri	Pescara	Alfa Romeo Giulietta Sprint Zagato	10	over time limit
NC	138	S2.0	(Italy) Paolo Samona	(Italy) Giuseppe de Sarzana	Paolo Samona	Maserati A6GCS/53	10	over time limit
NC	154	S3.0	(Italy) Pietro Ferraro	(Italy) Armando Zampiero	San Marco	Ferrari 250 GT SWB	10	over time limit
NC	156	S3.0	(Italy) Giuseppe Gasso	(Italy) Giovanni Giordano	Scuderia Etna	Ferrari 250 GT LWB	10	over time limit
DNF	120	S1.6	(Italy) Ludovico Scarfiotti	(United Kingdom) Colin Davis	Osca	Osca S1500 SF392	9	did not finish
DNF	136	S2.0	(United Kingdom) Stirling Moss	(United Kingdom) Graham Hill	Porsche KG	Porsche 718 RS 61	9	Differential
DNF	28	GT1.3	(Italy) Ivanhoe Avorio	(Italy) Carlo Facetti	Scuderia Sant’Ambroeus	Alfa Romeo Giulietta Sprint Veloce	7	did not finish
DNF	74	S1.0	(Italy) Gregorio Filippone	(Italy) Francesco Patané	Scuderia Etna	Osca MT4 1000	7	did not finish
DNF	40	GT1.3	(Italy) Gianni Bulgari	(Italy) Maurizio Grana	Campidoglio	Alfa Romeo Giulietta Sprint Zagato	6	did not finish
DNF	60	S1.0	(Italy) Marcello de Luca di Lizzano	(Italy) Attilio Brandi	Bardahl Italy	Osca S1000	6	did not finish
DNF	66	S1.0	(Italy) Massiom Leto di Priolo	(Italy) Ottavio Prandoni	Scuderia Ambrosiana	Fiat-Abarth 1000	6	did not finish
DNF	72	S1.0	(Italy) Mario Raimondo	(Italy) Aldebaran	Balarm	Osca MT4 1000	6	did not finish
DNF	6	GT1.3	(Italy) Antonio Accardi	(Italy) Alessandro Federico	Antonio Accardi	Alfa Romeo Giulietta Sprint Zagato	5	did not finish
DNF	14	GT1.3	(Italy) Guido Garufi	(Italy) Franco Tagliavia	Guido Garufi	Alfa Romeo Giulietta Sprint Zagato	5	did not finish
DNF	20	GT1.3	(Italy) Ermete Bosco	(Italy) Bruno Bevilacqua	Pescara	Alfa Romeo Giulietta Sprint Speciale	5	Accident
DNF	22	GT1.3	(Italy) Mario Tropia	(Italy) Giuseppe Parla	Nissena	Alfa Romeo Giulietta Spider	5	did not finish
DNF	24	GT1.3	(Italy) Michele Allegrini	(Italy) Clemente Avventurieri	Sila	Alfa Romeo Giulietta Sprint Zagato	5	did not finish
DNF	54	S1.0	(France) Gérard Laureau	(France) François Jaeger	Automobiles Deutsch et Bonnet	D.B.-Panhard HBR5	5	Gearbox
DNF	64	S1.0	(Italy) Domenico Rotolo	(Italy) Salvatore Sirchia	Monte Pellegrino	Osca MT4 1000	5	did not finish
DNF	100	GT2.5	(Italy) Sergio Mantia	(Italy) Giovanni Napoli	Monte Pellegrino	Fiat 8V Zagato	5	did not finish
DNF	106	GT2.5	(Italy) Gian Carlo Carfi	(Italy) Comar	Scuderia Etna	Lancia Flaminia Sport Zagato	5	did not finish
DNF	112	S1.6	(United States) William Schuldt	(United States) Pat Garret	William Schuldt	Stanguellini-Climax 1100	5	did not finish
DNF	78	S1.0	(Italy) Francesco de Leonibus	(Italy) Gino Munaron	Virgilio Conrero	Lotus-Climax Eleven	4	Gearbox
DNF	114	S1.6	(Italy) Pietro Termini	(Italy) Rosario Montalbano	Balarm	Ermini-Alfa Romeo 1500	4	Accident
DNF	142	S2.0	(Italy) Mennato Boffa	(Italy) Nino Todaro	Scuderia Serenissima	Maserati Tipo 60	4	Oil pipe
DNF	8	GT1.3	(Italy) Salvatore Leto di Priolo	(Italy) Corrado Manfredini	Scuderia Ambrosiana	Alfa Romeo Giulietta Sprint Zagato	3	did not finish
DNF	62	S1.0	(Italy) Carlo Maria Abate	(Italy) Gianni Balzarini	Scuderia Serenissima	Fiat-Abarth 1000 S	3	Oil pump
DNF	160	S3.0	(Mexico) Ricardo Rodríguez	(Belgium) Willy Mairesse	SEFAC Ferrari	Ferrari 250 TRI/61	3	Fuel tank
DNF	102	GT2.5	(France) Joseph Thomas	(West Germany) Siegfried Günther	Joseph Thomas	Porsche 356B Super 90	2	did not finish
DNF	2	GT1.3	(Italy) Salvatore Russo	(Italy) Giulio Pernice	Scuderia Etna	Alfa Romeo Giulietta Sprint Veloce	1	Accident
DNF	108	GT2.5	(Italy) Francesco di Benedetto	(Italy) Giuseppe D’Amico	Balarm	Alfa Romeo 2500	1	did not finish
DNF	144	S2.0	(Italy) Giuseppe Allotta	(Italy) Silvestre Semilia	Giuseppe Allotta	Maserati A6GCS/53	1	Accident
DNF	104	GT2.5	(Italy) Marino Guarnieri	(United Kingdom) Brian Whitehouse	Scuderia Sant’Ambroeus	Lancia Flaminia Sport Zagato	0	did not finish
DNF	140	S2.0	(Italy) Vincenzo Riolo	(Italy) Franco Bernabei	Centro-Sud	Maserati 200S I	0	did not finish
DNF	164	S3.0	(United States) Phil Hill	(United States) Richie Ginther	SEFAC Ferrari	Ferrari 246 SP	0	Accident
DNS	32	GT1.3	(Italy) ”Kim”	(Italy) Tommaso Carletti	Scuderia Sant’Ambroeus	Alfa Romeo Giulietta Sprint Zagato		did not start
DNS	36	GT1.3	(Italy) Luciano Conti	(Italy) Giancarlo Venturi	Scuderia Sant’Ambroeus	Alfa Romeo Giulietta Sprint Zagato		did not start
DNS	52	S1.0	(Italy) Camillo Giuliani	(Italy) Angelo Rizzo	Sila	Fiat Ciolino		did not start
DNS	58	S1.0	(Italy) Giuseppe D’Amico	(Italy) U. Fichera	Scuderia Etna	Fiat Ciolino		did not start
DNS	68	S1.0	(Italy) Remo Cattini	(Italy) Giuseppe Bonomo	Remo Cattini	Fiat-Abarth 1000 S		did not start
DNS	76	S1.0	(Italy) Alfonso Vella	(Italy) Giuseppe Virgilio	Alfonso Vella	Fiat Ciolino		did not start
DNS	80	S1.0	(Italy) Michele Paratore	(Italy) Seire	Michele Paratore	Fiat-Abarth 1000 S		did not start
DNS	116	S1.6	(Italy) Ada Pace	(Italy) Gianfranco Stanga	Osca	Osca S1100		did not start
DNS	118	S1.6	(Italy) Gaspare Cavaliere	(Italy) Gaetano Starrabba	Segesta	Porsche 718 RSK		did not start
DNS	T	S2.0	(United States) Dan Gurney		Porsche KG	Porsche 718 RS 61		Practiced only (Accident)

- Fastest Lap: Wolfgang von Trips, 40:03.2secs (67.019 mph)

=== Class Winners ===
Class	Winners		
Sports 3000	162	Ferrari 246 SP	von Trips / Gendebien
Sports 2000	134	Porsche 718 RS 61	Bonnier / Gurney
Sports 1600	No classified finisher		
Sports 1000	70	Osca S100	Bini / Rigamonti
Grand Touring 2500	9	Porsche 356B Carrera Abarth GTL	Strähle / Pucci
Grand Touring 1300	38	Alfa Romeo Giulietta Sprint Zagato	Rosinski / Consten

== Standings after the race ==
Pos	Championship	Points
1	(Italy) Ferrari	16
2	(West Germany) Porsche	8
3	(Italy) Maserati	3

- Note: Only the top five positions are included in this set of standings.

Championship points were awarded for the first six places in each race in the order of 8-6-4-3-2-1. Manufacturers were only awarded points for their highest finishing car with no points awarded for positions filled by additional cars. Only the best 3 results out of the 5 races could be retained by each manufacturer. Points earned but not counted towards the championship totals are listed within brackets in the above table.

World Sportscar Championship
Previous race: 12 Hours of Sebring	1961 season	Next race: 1000km Nürburgring

FIA GT Cup
Previous race: 12 Hours of Sebring	1961 season	Next race: Coppa Ascari
