= Barbadirame =

Italian artist (1923–2010)

Mario Raimondo, known as Barbadirame (1923–2010), was an Italian artist.

== Life ==
Barbadirame was a close associate of Pablo Picasso from when the pair first met in the 1950s until Picasso's death in 1973. Speaking about Barbadirame in 1963 Pablo Picasso said: “To speak about young painters it is not my habit. The Italian painter ‘Raimondo' known as ‘Barbadirame', is a true painter, serious, like the workers of his earth. He implements his works decisively and with simplicity. The stone walls, the mediterranean olive trees, all have the same humanity of their agriculturists, the eternity. He is an artist that counts”.

Mario Raimondo was born in Dolceacqua, Italy, in 1923. He began his professional life as a decorator, painting numerous frescoes in private residences and castles while wandering the Riviera dei Fiori and the Costa Azzurra. Barbadirame was a complete artist, equally at home in different mediums. A painter and a sculptor, one of his most famed sculptures is the huge statue he created, in collaboration with Mario Agrifoglio, in honor of the astronomer Gian Domenico Cassini (1625–1712).

During his life Barbadirame's exhibitions were attended by celebrities including Jean Cocteau, Picasso, Grace Kelly and her husband, the prince of Monaco. Towards the end of his career, Barbardirame received the Biamonti Prize, a prize for art and literature portraying the true essence of Italy's Liguria region. The prize was named after Francesco Biamonti (1933–2001), a celebrated Italian novelist from Liguria. Biamonti himself wrote of Barbardirame's work: “His peasants, his women, his Christs have lost every crudeness, without losing the truth of their solidity…”

Barbadirame died in Bordighera, Italy, on 15 January 2010.
