= 1961 World Sportscar Championship =

Racing tournament

Seasons
- ← 1960 1962 →

The 1961 World Sportscar Championship was the ninth season of FIA World Sportscar Championship motor racing. It was contested over a five race series, which ran from 25 March to 15 August 1961. The title was won by Italian manufacturer Ferrari.

== Season schedule and results ==
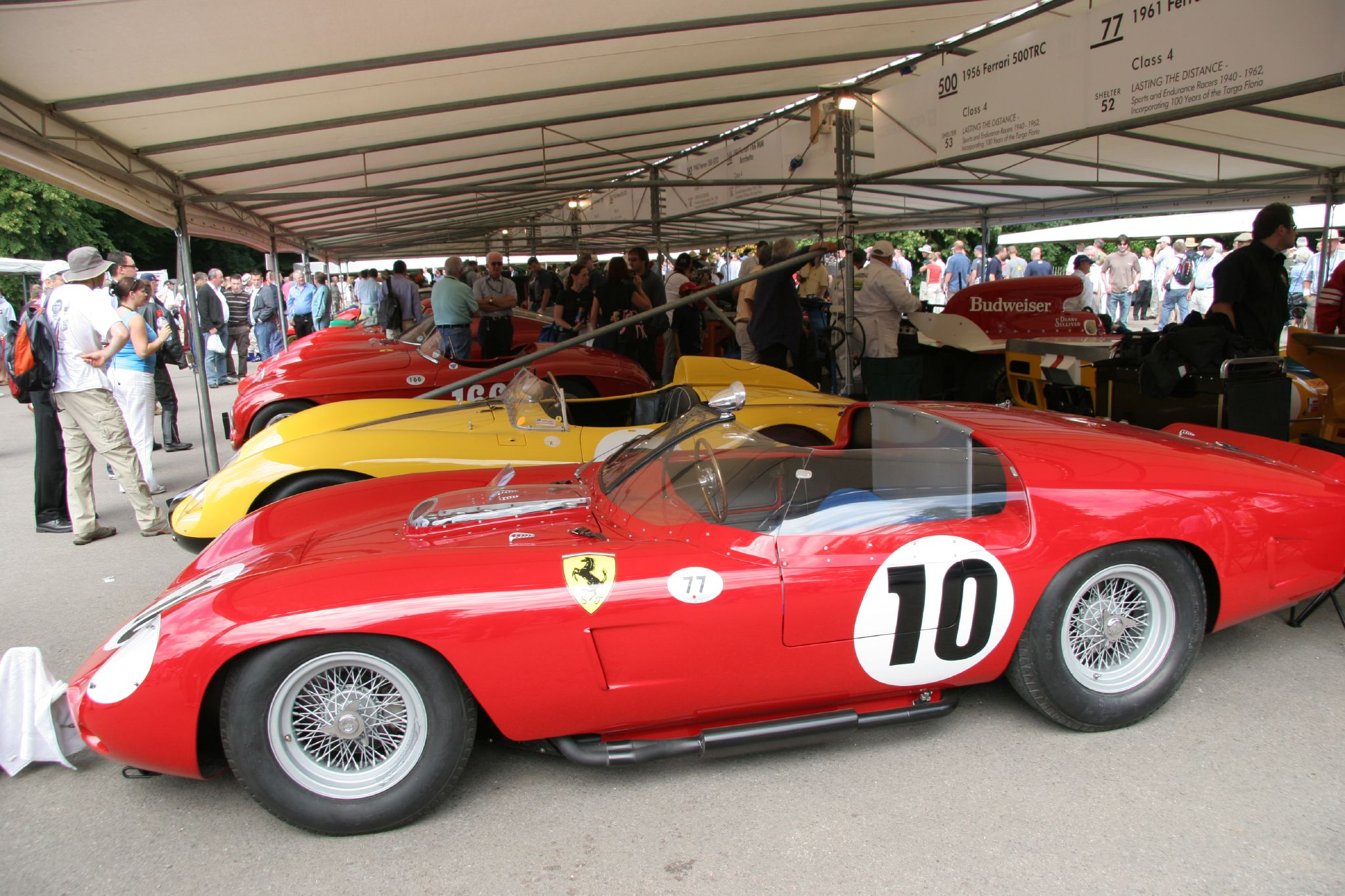
Ferrari won the 1961 World Sports Car Championship with their 250 TR61 (pictured) and 246 SP models

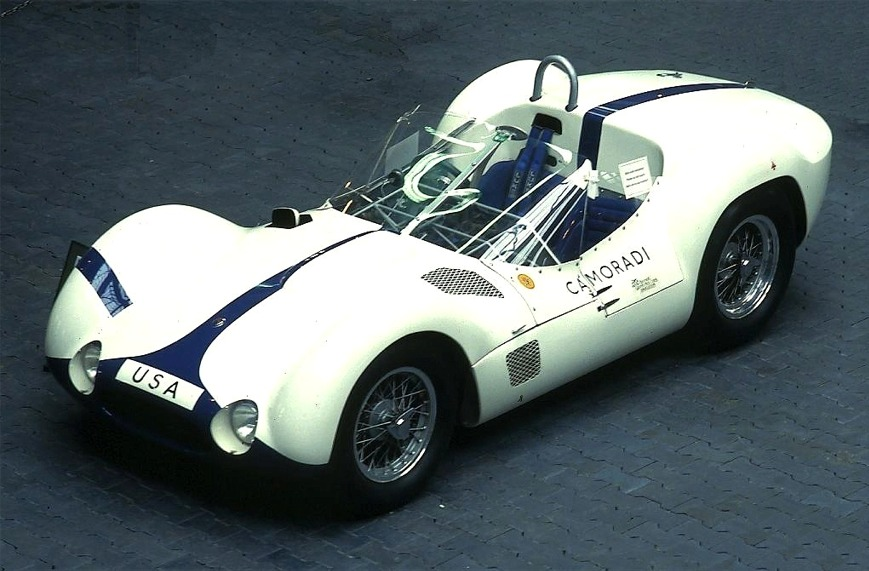
Maserati placed second with their Tipo 61 (pictured) and Tipo 63 models

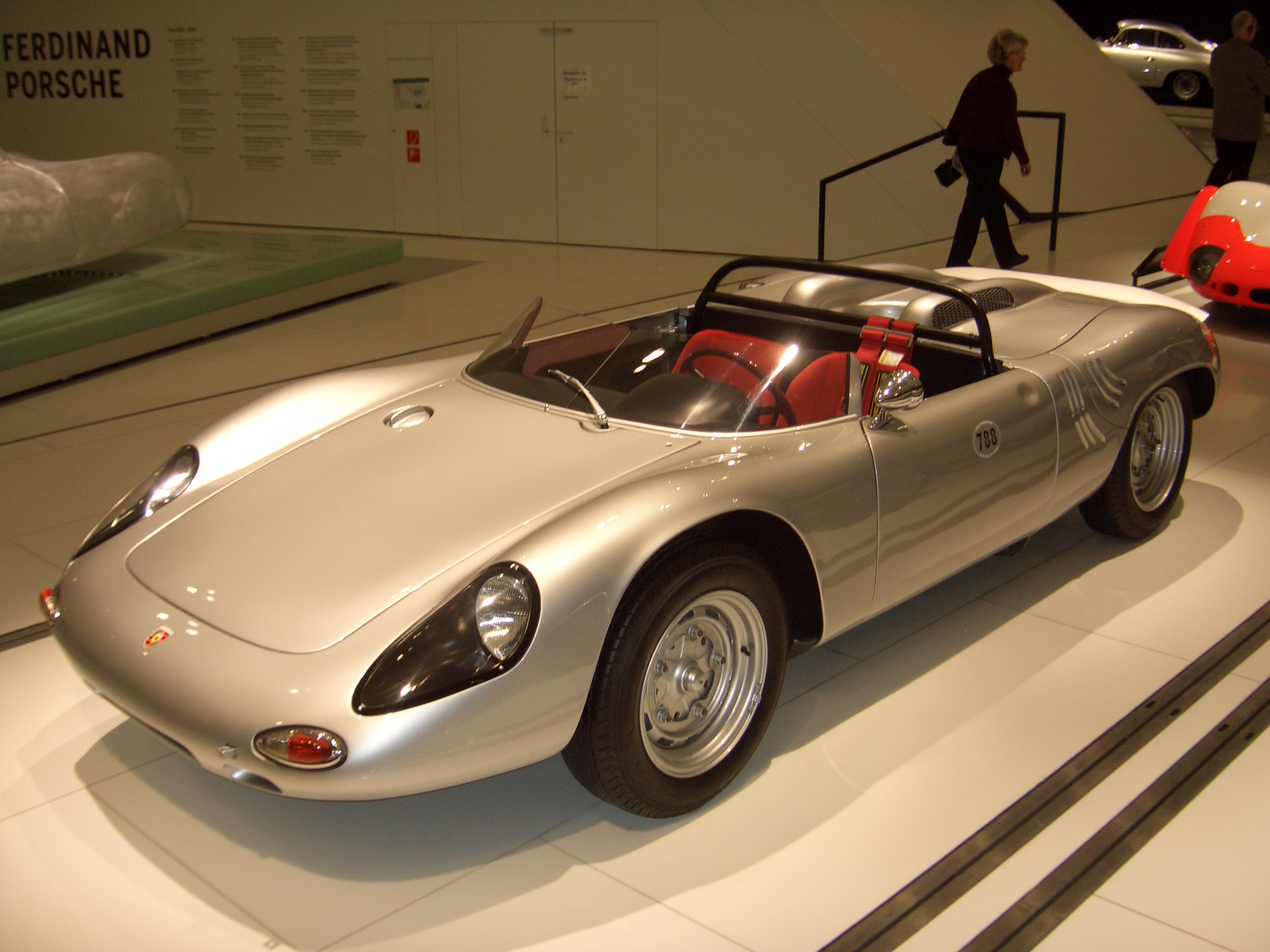
Porsche placed third with their 718 RS61 model (pictured)

=== Schedule with results ===
Round	Date	Race	Circuit	Location	Winning Team	Winning drivers	Winning car	Results
1	March 25	(United States) 12 Hours of Sebring	Sebring International Raceway	Sebring, Florida, United States	(Italy) #14 Scuderia Ferrari	(United States) Phil Hill (Belgium) Olivier Gendebien	Ferrari 250 TR61	Results
2	April 30	(Italy) Targa Florio	Circuito delle Madonie	Cerda, Sicily, Italy	(Italy) #162 Scuderia Ferrari	(Germany) Wolfgang von Trips (Belgium) Olivier Gendebien	Ferrari 246 SP	Results
3	May 28	(Germany) 1000km Nürburgring	Nürburgring	Nürburg, Rhineland-Palatinate, Germany	(United States) #1 Camoradi USA	(United States) Masten Gregory (United States) Lloyd Casner	Maserati Tipo 61	Results
4	June 10-11	(France) 24 Hours of Le Mans	Circuit de la Sarthe	Le Mans, Sarthe, France	(Italy) #10 Scuderia Ferrari	(United States) Phil Hill (Belgium) Olivier Gendebien	Ferrari 250 TR61	Results
5	August 15	(Italy) 4 Hours of Pescara	Pescara Circuit	Pescara, Italy	(Italy) #4 Scuderia Centro Sud	(Italy) Lorenzo Bandini (Italy) Giorgio Scarlatti	Ferrari 250 TR61	Results

=== Manufacturers Championship ===
Points were awarded to the top 6 places, in the order of 8-6-4-3-2-1, however manufacturers were only awarded points for their highest finishing car in each race, with no points awarded to places filled by other cars from the same manufacturer..

Only half points were awarded at the Pescara race as it was staged over a four-hour duration, which was less than the FIA’s minimum requirement of six hours or 1000km.

Only the best 3 results out of the 5 race season counted towards the championship totals of each manufacturer. Discarded points are shown within brackets.

Pos	Manufacturer	(United States) SEB	(Italy) TGA	(West Germany) NÜR	(France) LMS	(Italy) PES	Total
1	(Italy) Ferrari	8	8	(6)	8	(4)	24
2	(Italy) Maserati		3	8	3	(2)	14
3	(Germany) Porsche	2	6	(1)	(2)	3	11
4	(Italy) O.S.C.A.					1	1

=== The cars ===
The following models contributed to the nett points totals of their respective manufacturers in the 1961 World Sports Car Championship.

- Ferrari 250 TR61 & Ferrari 246 SP
- Maserati Tipo 61 & Maserati Tipo 63
- Porsche 718 RS61
- O.S.C.A. S1600
