= 1961 12 Hours of Sebring =

Sports car endurance race

Sebring International Raceway in 1952-1966

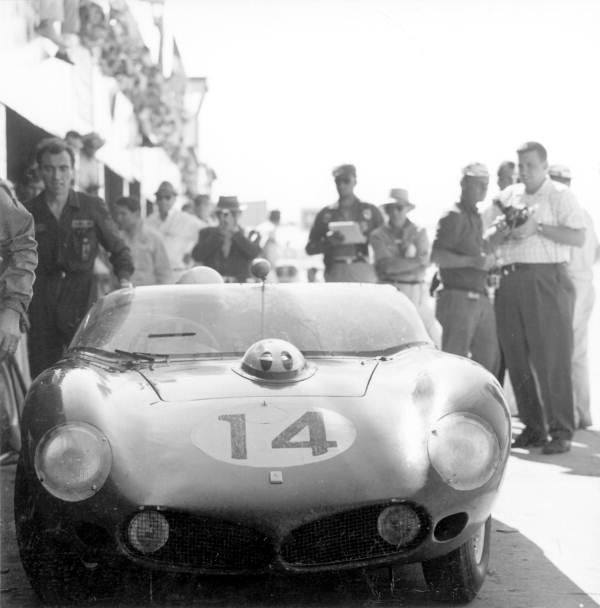
Ferrari 250 TRI

The Sebring 12-Hour Florida International Grand Prix of Endurance for the Alitalia Group took place on 25 March 1961, on the Sebring International Raceway, (Florida, United States). It was the opening round of the F.I.A. World Sports Car Championship. This was also the second round of the F.I.A. GT Cup.

== Report ==
=== Entry ===
A massive total of 74 racing cars were registered for this event, of which 67 arrived for practice. Out of these, 65 qualified for, and started the race.

=== Qualifying ===
As was the norm for Sebring and because there was no qualifying sessions to set the grid, the starting positions were decided according to engine size with the 4.6 litre Chevrolet Corvette C1 of Don Yenko and Ben Moore being given first place.

=== Race ===
Most of the 40,000 spectators expected Phil Hill to win the race in his Ferrari 250 TRI/61, provided the car lasted the distance.

Stirling Moss had a bad start due to his Maserati Tipo 61 having problems starting as the battery was flat. It took the Englishman over six minutes to coax the car into life. However, after driving flat out for two hours, he handed the car over to Graham Hill. During the third hour, the car was withdrawn as it exhaust system fell apart.

After 12 hours of racing, the race was won the Sefac Automobile Ferrari of Phil Hill and Olivier Gendebien, two laps clear of their teammates. Giancarlo Baghetti, Willy Mairesse, Richie Ginther and Wolfgang von Trips. The winning cars, completed 210 laps, covering 1,081.6 miles after 12 hours of racing, averaging a speed of 89.861 mph. The podium was complete by another Ferrari of Pedro Rodríguez (racing driver) and his brother Ricardo who were a further lap behind.

== Official Classification ==
Class Winners are in Bold text.

Pos	No	Class	Driver		Entrant	Chassis	Laps	Reason Out
1st	**14**	**S3.0**	(United States) **Phil Hill**	(Belgium) **Olivier Gendebien**	**Sefac Automobile Ferrari**	**Ferrari 250 TRI/61**	**12hr 02:11.00, 210**	
2nd	415	S3.0	(Italy) Giancarlo Baghetti (United States) Richie Ginther	(Belgium) Willy Mairesse (West Germany) Wolfgang von Trips	Sefac Automobile Ferrari	Ferrari 250 TRI/60	208	
3rd	17	S3.0	(Mexico) Pedro Rodríguez	(Mexico) Ricardo Rodríguez	NART	Ferrari 250 TR 59/60	207	
4th	10	S3.0	(United States) Hap Sharp	(United States) Ronnie Hissom	Hap Sharp	Ferrari 250 TR 59	203	
5th	**51**	**S1.6**	(United States) **Bob Holbert**	(United States) **Roger Penske**	**Brumos Porsche Company**	**Porsche 718 RS 61**	**199**	
6th	**22**	**S2.5**	(United States) **Jim Hall**	(United States) **George Constantine**	**NART**	**Dino 246 S**	**199**	
7th	47	S1.6	(United States) Don Sesslar (United States) Ernie Erickson	(United States) Bob Donner	Bob Donner	Porsche 718 RS 61	199	
8th	16	S3.0	(United States) George Reed	(United States) Bill Sturgis	McCook Window Company	Ferrari 250 TR 59/60	196	
9th	39	S1.6	(Canada) Peter Ryan (Canada) Ludwig Heimrath	(Canada) Francis Bradley	Eglinton Caledonia Motors	Porsche 718 RS 61	189	
**10th**	**12**	**GT3.0**	(United States) **Denise McCluggage**	(United States) **Allen Eager**	**Denise McCluggage**	**Ferrari 250 GT SWB**	**183**	
**11th**	**4**	**GT+3.0**	(United States) **Delmo Johnson**	(United States) **Dave Morgan**	**Johnson Chevrolet**	**Chevrolet Corvette C1**	**181**	
12th	18	GT3.0	(Switzerland) Gaston Andrey (United States) Robert Publicker	(United States) Allen Newman	Scuderia Serenissima	Ferrari 250 GT California	180	
**13th**	**64**	**S1.15**	(United States) **Charles Kurtz**	(United States) **Millard Ripley**	**Lola America**	**Lola-Climax Mk.1**	**179**	
14th	**44**	**GT1.6**	(United States) **Jack Flaherty**	(United States) **Jim Parkinson**	**British Motors Corp. (USA)**	**MG A**	**175**	
15th	66	S1.15	(United States) Joe Buzzetta	(United States) Glenn Carlson	Donald Healey	Austin-Healey Sebring Sprite	174	
16th	43	GT1.6	(United Kingdom) Peter RIley	(United Kingdom) John Whitmore	British Motors Corp. (USA)	MG A	173	
17th	42	GT1.6	(United Kingdom) Peter Procter (South Africa) Bob Olthoff	(United Kingdom) Peter Harper	Jack Brabhams Motors	Sunbeam Alpine	173	
18th	**37**	**S2.0**	(United States) **William Helburn** (United States) **John Fulp**	(United States) **Skip Hudson**	**NART**	**Dino 196 S**	**173**	
19th	31	S2.0	(United States) Briggs Cunningham (United States) Walt Hansgen	(United States) William Kimberly	Momo Corporation	Maserati Tipo 60	171	
20th	**71**	**S850**	(United States) **George Peck** (United States) **Bob Richardson**	(United States) **John Hoffman**	**Clearwater Motors**	**Osca S750**	**171**	
20th	**32**	**GT2.0**	(United States) **Max Goldman**	(United States) **Ralph Durbin**	**S. H. Arnolt**	**Arnolt Deluxe**	**166**	
22nd	83	GT+3.0	(United States) Bud Gates	(United States) Harry Heuer	Chevrolet Corvette C	Bud Gates, Inc.	166	
23rd	87	GT2.0	(United States) Bud Seaverns	(United States) Robert Hil	S. H. Arnolt	Arnolt Deluxe	164	
24th	33	GT2.0	(United States) Tom Payne	(United States) Ray Cuomo	S. H. Arnolt	Arnolt Deluxe	163	
25th	65	S1.15	(Canada) Ed Leavens	(United States) John Colgate	Donald Healey	Austin-Healey Sebring Sprite	161	
26th	30	GT2.0	(United States) Al Rogers	(United States) James Bailey	Salter Auto Imports	Morgan 4/4	156	
27th	**58**	**GT1.3**	(United States) **Ross Durant**	(United States) **Art Swanson**	**Arthur Swanson**	**Alfa Romeo Giuletta Veloce**	**155**	
28th	60	GT1.3	(Mexico) Fred van Beuren	(Mexico) Carlos Sales	Autosport S. A.	Alfa Romeo Giulietta Sprint Speciale	155	
29th	26	GT2.0	(United States) Ike Williamson	(United States) George Waltman	George Waltman	Triumph TR3	154	
30th	29	GT2.0	(United States) James Rushin	(United States) Don Parsons	Suburban Foreign Cars	Triumph TR3	153	
31st	55	GT1.6	(United States) Filippo Theodoli	(United States) Freddie Barrette	Filippo Theodoli	Sunbeam Alpine	153	
32nd	1	GT+3.0	(United States) Don Yenko	(United States) Ben Moore	Yenko Chevrolet	Chevrolet Corvette C1	151	
33rd	59	GT1.3	(United States) Allan Jacobson (United States) Jim O'Brien	(United States) Tom O'Brien	Thomas O'Brien	Alfa Romeo Giulietta Sprint Speciale	151	
34th	40	GT1.6	(United Kingdom) Paddy Hopkirk	(United Kingdom) Peter Jopp	Rootes Motors, Inc.	Sunbeam Alpine	149	
35th	46	GT1.6	(United States) Ed Gelder (United States) Bill Fuller	(United States) Peggy McClure	Carl Haas Automotive	Elva Courier	149	
36th	45	GT1.6	(United States) Don Horn	(United States) Ed Tucker	Carl Haas Automotive	Elva Courier	144	
37th	67	S1.15	(United Kingdom) Cyril Simson	(Australia) Paul Hawkins	John Sprinzel	Austin-Healey Sebring Sprite	144	
NC	3	S1.6	(United States) George Robertson (United States) Bill Warren	(United States) Ben Burroughs	Red Vogt	Chevrolet Corvette C1	133	
DNF	50	S2.0	(West Germany) Hans Herrmann	(East Germany) Edgar Barth	Porsche Auto	Porsche 718 RS 61		Engine
DNF	60	S2.0	(Sweden) Jo Bonnier	(United States) Dan Gurney	Porsche Auto	Porsche 718 RS 61		Clutch
DNF	57	GT1.3	(United States) Ralph Troiano	(United States) Harry Theodoracopulos	Lou Comito	Alfa Romeo Giulietta Zagato	103	
NC	80	S1.15	(United States) Lars Giertz	(United States) Bob Liess	Abarth DFL Co.	Fiat-Abarth Record Monza	110	Water & oil leak
DISQ	56	GT1.3	(United States) Charlie Rainville	(United States) Jake Kaplan	Jake Kaplan	Alfa Romeo Giulietta Sprint Speciale		Illegal refuel
DNF	25	S3.0	(United States) Dave Causey	(United States) Luke Stear	Rallye Motors	Maserati Tipo 61		
DNF	68	S1.15	(United States) L. Fritz Taylor	(United States) James Calhoun	Abarth DFL Co.	Fiat-Abrath 1000 S		Broken head stud
DNF	63	S1.15	(United States) Chuck Hall	(United States) Alan Ross	Lola America	Lola-Climax Mk.1		Ignition failure
DNF	26	S2.5	(United States) Ed Hugus	(United States) Alan Connell	NART	Dino 246 S		Transmission
DNF	69	S850	(United States) David Cunningham (United States) Tom Fleming	(United States) Kent Price	NART	Osca S1000		Transmission
DNF	20	S3.0	(United States) Walt Hansgen	(New Zealand) Bruce McLaren	Momo Corporation	Maserati Tipo 63		Rear axle
DNF	8	GT+3.0	(United States) Sherman Decker	(United States) Bob Bucher	David Ash	Aston Martin DB4 GT		Broken hub
DNF	48	S1.6	(United States) Chuck Cassel	(United States) David Lane	Association Automovilisti Santaneca	Porsche 718 RS 61		Blown engine
DNF	36	GT2.0	(United States) Frank Laughton	(United Kingdom) Robert Bowers	A.C. Cars Ltd.	AC Ace		
DNF	70	S850	(United States) Gene Beach (United States) John Bentley	(United States) Henry Grady	Begra Cars	Begra-Saab Mk II		Engine
DNF	11	GT3.0	(France) Fernand Tavano	(United States) George Arents	Scuderia Serenissima	Ferrari 250 GT SWB		Differential
DNF	7	GT+3.0	(United States) Bob Grossman	(United States) Duncan Black	David Ash	Aston Martin DB4 GT		Broken hub
DNF	2	GT+3.0	(United States) Roy Reardon	(United States) John Kilbourn	Yenko Chervrolet	Chevrolet Corvette C1		Blown engine
DNF	24	S3.0	(United States) Masten Gregory (United Kingdom) Stirling Moss	(United States) Lloyd Casner	Camoradi USA	Maserati Tipo 63		Suspension
DNF	27	S2.5	(United States) Richie Ginther	(West Germany) Wolfgang von Trips	Sefac Automobile Ferrari	Ferrari 246 SP		Steering arm
DNF	41	GT1.6	(United States) Ed Wilson	(United States) Vince Tamburo	Rootes Motors, Inc.	Sunbeam Alpine		Oil leak
DNF	21	S3.0	(United States) John Fitch	(United States) Dick Thompson	Mono Corporation	Maserati Tipo 61		Transmission
DNF	23	S3.0	(United Kingdom) Stirling Moss	(United Kingdom) Graham Hill	Camoradi USA	Maserati Tipo 61		Exhaust manifold
DNF	38	S1.6	(United States) Bill Wuesthoff	(United Kingdom) Augie Pabst	Porsche Car Import	Porsche 718 RS 60		Main seal
DNF	35	GT2.0	(United States) Leo May	(United States) James Johnston	A.C. Cars Ltd.	AC Ace		Accident
DNF	72	S850	(United States) Howard Hanna	(United States) Frank Manley	YBH Sales	D.B. Le Mans		Valve failure
DNF	9	S3.0	(United States) Pete Lovely	(United States) Jack Nethercutt	Jack Nethercutt	Ferrari 250 TR 59		Oil pump
DNS	5	GT+3.0	(United States) Jack Moore	(United States) Bob Johnson	Glenn Campbell Chevrolet	Chevrolet Corvette C1		Reserve
DNS	53	S2.5	(United States) Robert Publicker	(United States) Charlie Kolb	Robert Publicker	Lotus-Climax 19		Engine
DNS	86	S1.6	(United States) Herb Swan	(United States) Ed Johnson	Lester Castings	Porsche 718 RSK		Reserve
DNS	1P	GT3.0			Yenko Chevrolet	Chevrolet Corvette C1		T-car

- Fastest Lap: Stirling Moss, 3:13.2secs (96.894 mph)

=== Class Winners ===
Class	Winners		
Sports 3000 – Class S-12	14	Ferrari 250 TRI/61	Hill / Gendebien
Sports 2500 – Class S-11	22	Dino 246 S	Hall / Constantine
Sports 2000 – Class S-10	37	Dino 196 S	Helburn / Hudson / Fulp
Sports 1600 – Class S-9	51	Porsche 718 RS 61	Holbert / Penske
Sports 1150 – Class S-7	64	Lola-Climax Mk.1	Kurtz / Ripley
Sports 850 – Class S-5	71	Osca S750	Peck / Hoffman / Richardson
Grand Touring +3000 – Class GT-13/15	4	Chevrolet Corvette C1	Johnson / Morgan
Grand Touring 3000 – Class GT-11/12	12	Ferrari 250 GT SWB	McCluggage / Eager
Grand Touring 2000 – Class GT-10	32	Arnolt Deluxe	Goldman / Durbin
Grand Touring 1600 – Class GT-9	44	MGA	Flaherty / Parkinson
Grand Touring 1300 – Class GT-8	58	Alfa Romeo Giuletta Spider Veloce	Durant / Swanson

== Standings after the race ==
Pos	Championship	Points
1	(Italy) Ferrari	8
2	(West Germany) Porsche	2

- Note: Only the top five positions are included in this set of standings.

Championship points were awarded for the first six places in each race in the order of 8-6-4-3-2-1. Manufacturers were only awarded points for their highest finishing car with no points awarded for positions filled by additional cars. Only the best 3 results out of the 5 races could be retained by each manufacturer. Points earned but not counted towards the championship totals are listed within brackets in the above table.

World Sportscar Championship
Previous race: 24 Hours of Le Mans	1961 season	Next race: Targa Florio

FIA GT Cup
Previous race: 4 Hours of Sebring	1961 season	Next race: Targa Florio
