= Alfa Romeo Giulietta Sprint Speciale =

Alfa Romeo Giulietta Sprint Speciale Alfa Romeo Giulia Sprint Speciale
- Alfa Romeo Giulia Sprint Speciale

Overview
- Manufacturer: Alfa Romeo
- Also called: Giulietta SS; Giulia SS
- Production: 1959–1966
- Assembly: Portello, Italy
- Designer: Franco Scaglione at Bertone

Body and chassis
- Class: Sports car (S)
- Body style: 2-door coupé
- Layout: Front-engine, rear-wheel-drive
- Related: Alfa Romeo Giulietta Sprint; Alfa Romeo Giulietta Sprint Zagato; Alfa Romeo Giulia Sprint

Powertrain
- Engine: 1.3 L AR 00120 DOHC I4; 1.6 L AR 00121 DOHC I4
- Transmission: 5-speed manual

Dimensions
- Wheelbase: 2,250 mm (88.6 in)
- Length: 4,120 mm (162.2 in)
- Width: 1,660 mm (65.4 in)
- Height: 1,245 mm (49.0 in)
- Kerb weight: 860 kg (1,900 lb) (Giulietta); 950 kg (2,090 lb) (Giulia)

The Alfa Romeo Giulietta Sprint Speciale (Tipo 750 SS/101.20, Italian for "Type 750 SS/101.20") and Alfa Romeo Giulia Sprint Speciale (Tipo 101.21), also known as Giulietta SS and Giulia SS, are sports cars manufactured by Italian automaker Alfa Romeo from 1959 to 1966.

== Giulietta Sprint Speciale ==
The Giuletta Sport Speciale traces its roots in the Berlinetta Aerodinamica Tecnica (B.A.T.) concept cars penned by Franco Scaglione at Bertone in the 1950s. These concept cars featured some of the most revolutionary aerodynamics at the time and a B.A.T. concept car was reported to have achieved a drag co-efficient of just 0.19, the lowest of any car at the time.

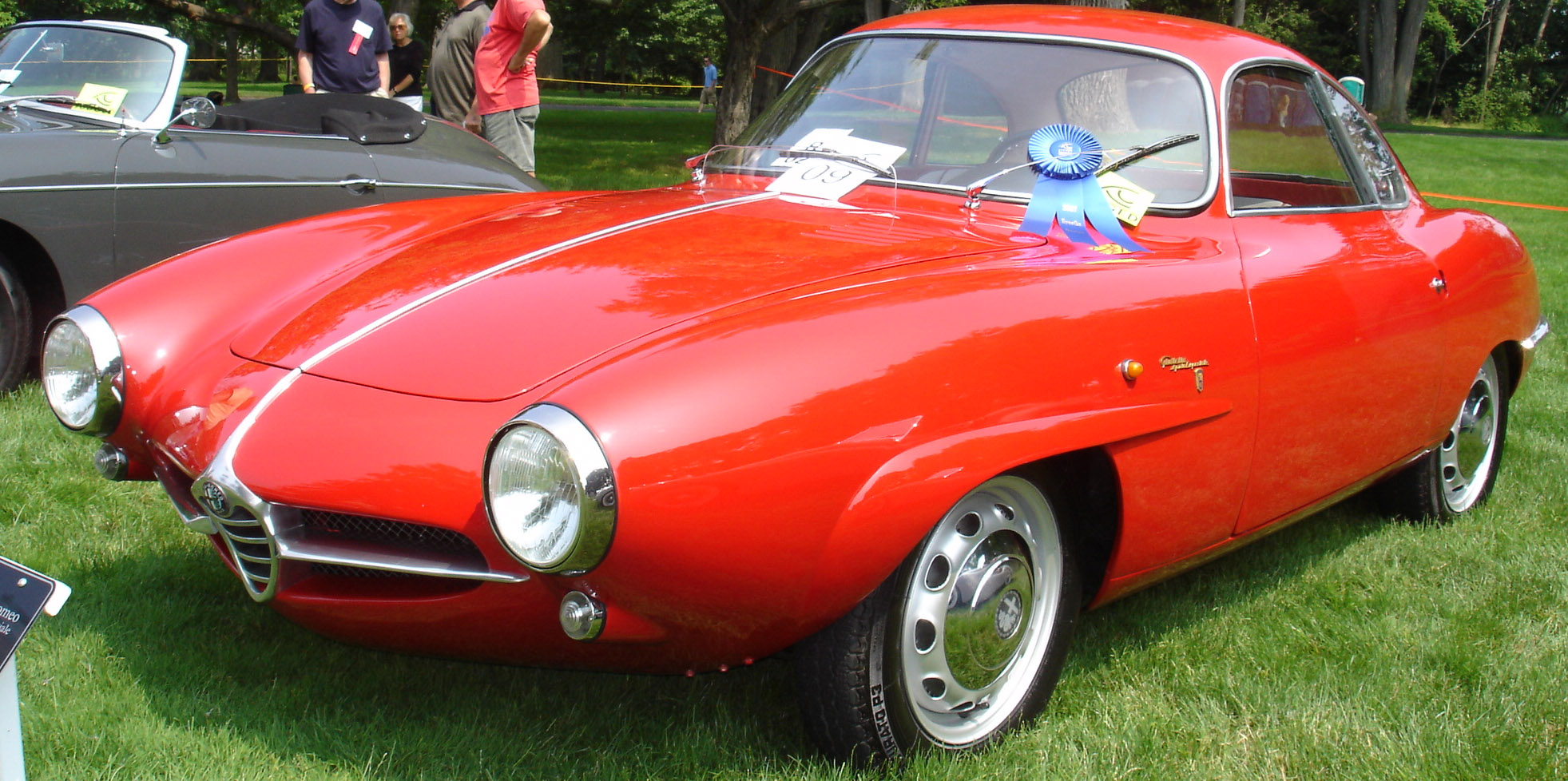
"Low nose" Giulietta Sprint Speciale.

The very first prototype of the Giulietta SS was presented in 1957 at the Turin Motor Show. After two more prototypes were unveiled, the production version of the car was presented on 24 June 1959 at the Monza race track. The first 101 cars produced had "low nose" and 750 SS designation. A minimum of 100 cars were needed to homologate the car for the FIA regulations. While the production run included some cars with all-aluminium bodies, the majority of these cars had steel bodies with aluminium doors, engine bonnet and boot lid. The early production examples were also equipped with Weber 40 DCO3 carburettors, later changed to the 40 DCOE2. The Sprint Speciale has a drag coefficient of 0.28, the same as a modern day Chevrolet Corvette (C6), which was not surpassed for more than twenty years. The engine is a 1,290 cc (1.3 L) Alfa Romeo Twin Cam engine, a 4-cylinder design with hemispheric combustion chambers and valves controlled directly by twin overhead camshafts. The early low-nose examples of the Giuletta SS are considered to be a popular choice amongst collectors.

Some small changes to the later production models which included steel doors, Weber 40 DCOE2 carburetors, a higher front nose and the removal of plexiglass windows. Bumpers were fitted front and rear and the cars had a minimal level of sound-proofing. With 100 hp (74 kW) of power, the maximum top speed was quoted to be around 200 km/h (124 mph). The engine and gearbox were the same units as used in the race-oriented Giulietta Sprint Zagato. All cars have three-shoe drum brakes at the front wheels and drum brakes at the rear. The side badges of the car have the "Giulietta Sprint Speciale" script in gold. US market models received an internal designation of 101.17.

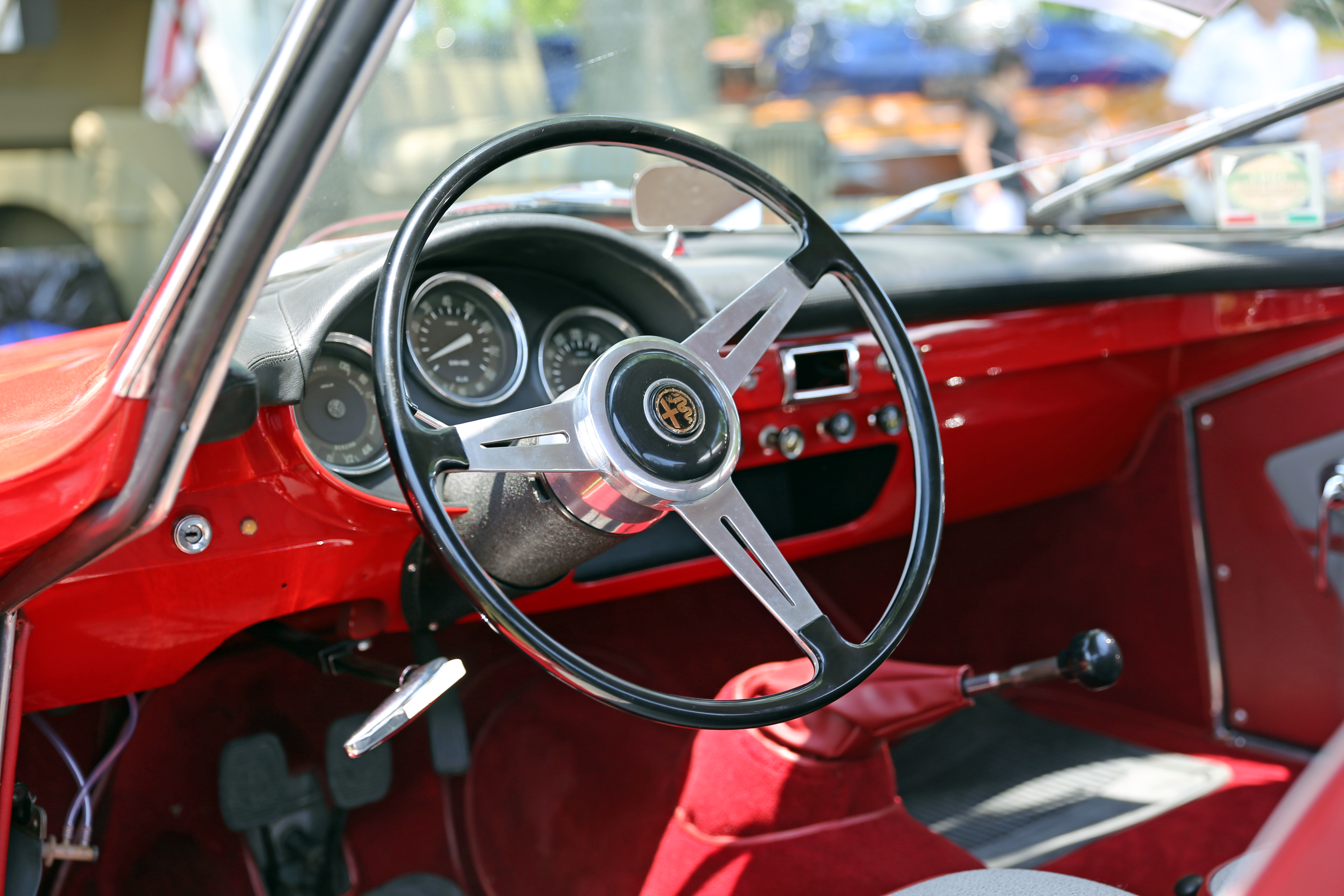
Dashboard of a 1961 Giulietta Sprint Speciale.

== Giulia Sprint Speciale ==
=== Giulia Sprint Speciale Bertone Prototipo ===
There was a prototype by Bertone of a replacement for Giulietta SS, named "Giulia SS Bertone Prototipo", but the new design did not enter production, and the next generation of the Giulia SS carried over an unchanged Giulietta SS body. The car was designed in 1965 by Giorgetto Giugiaro during the end of his stay at Bertone.

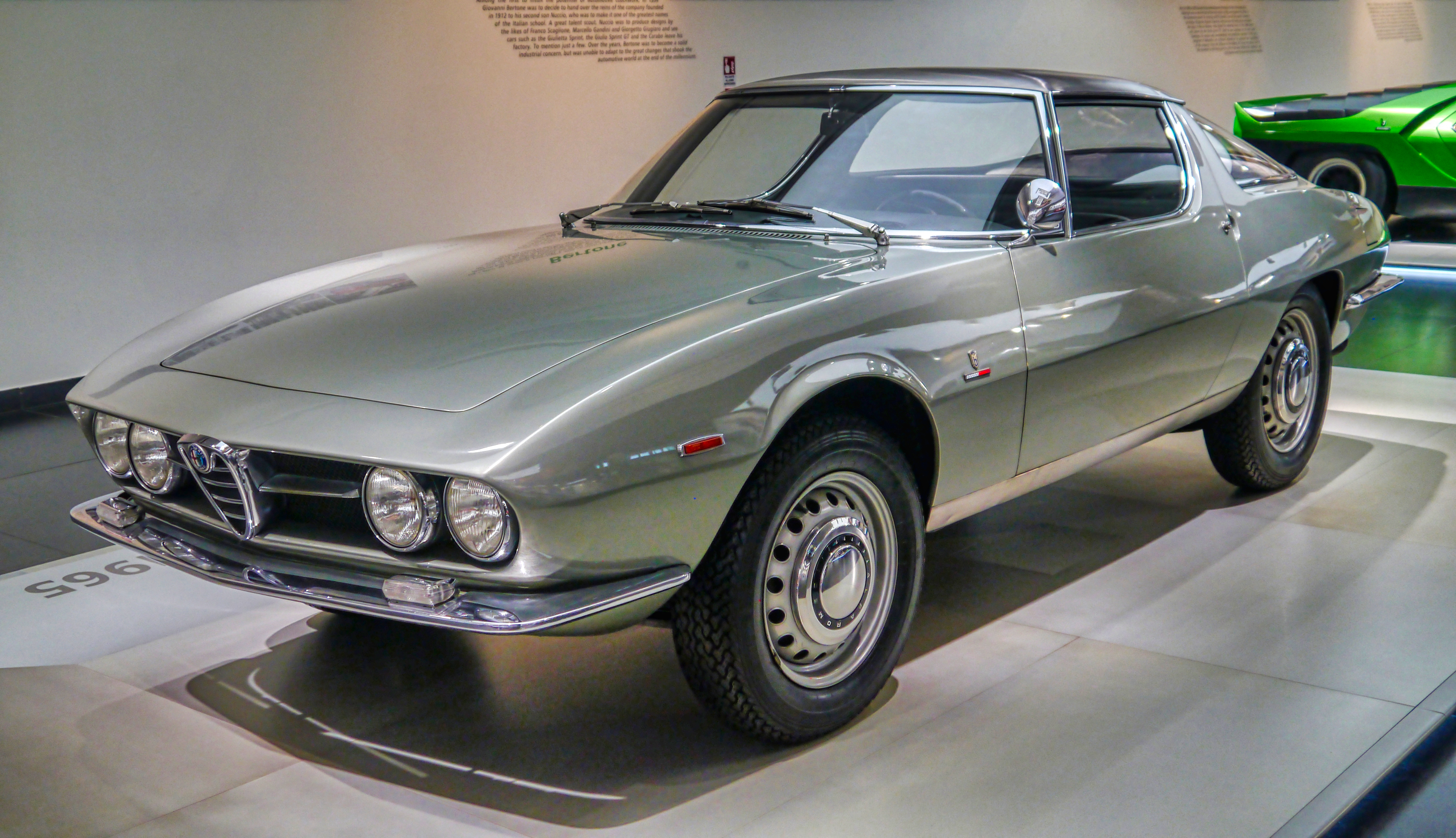
Giulia Sprint Speciale Bertone Prototipo

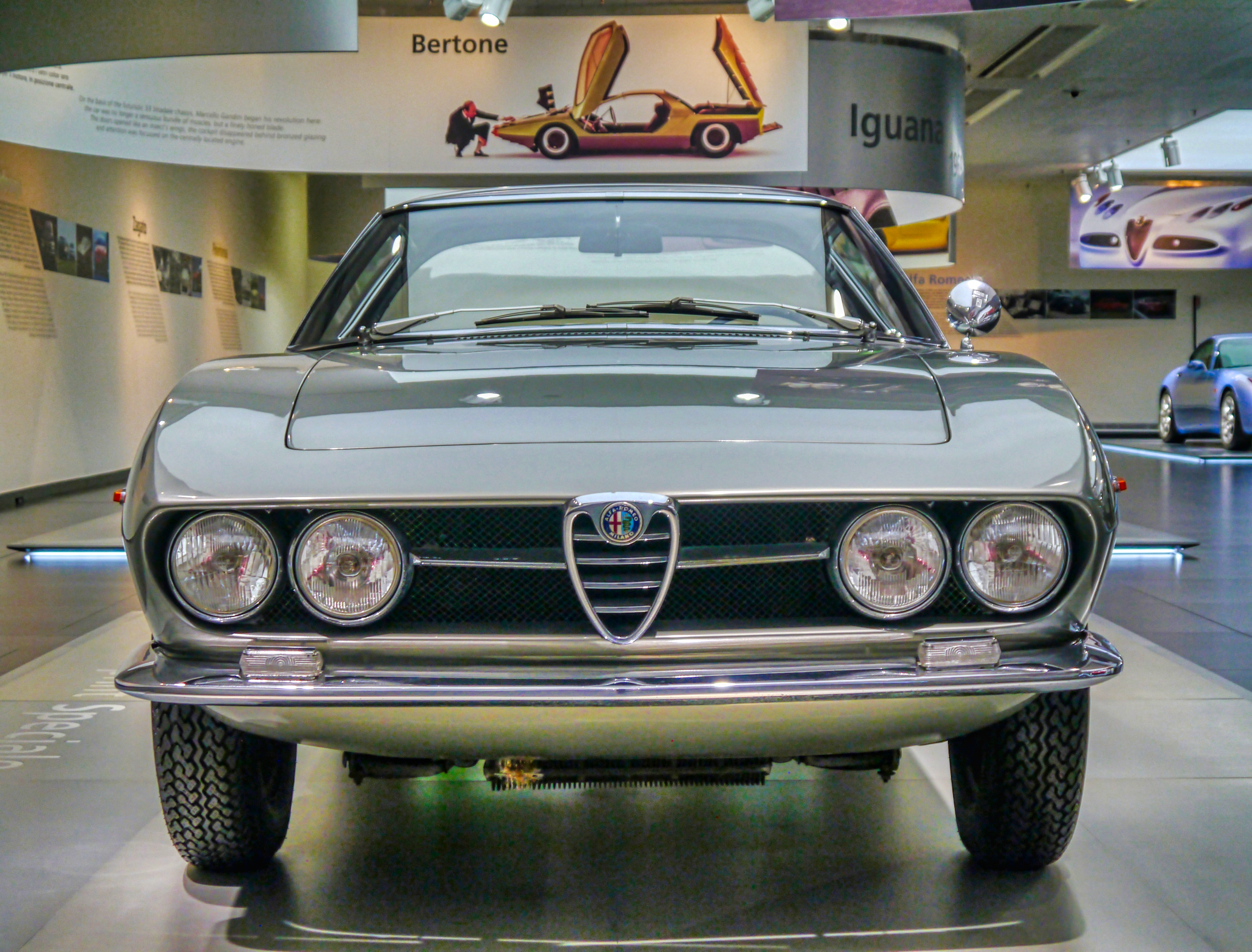

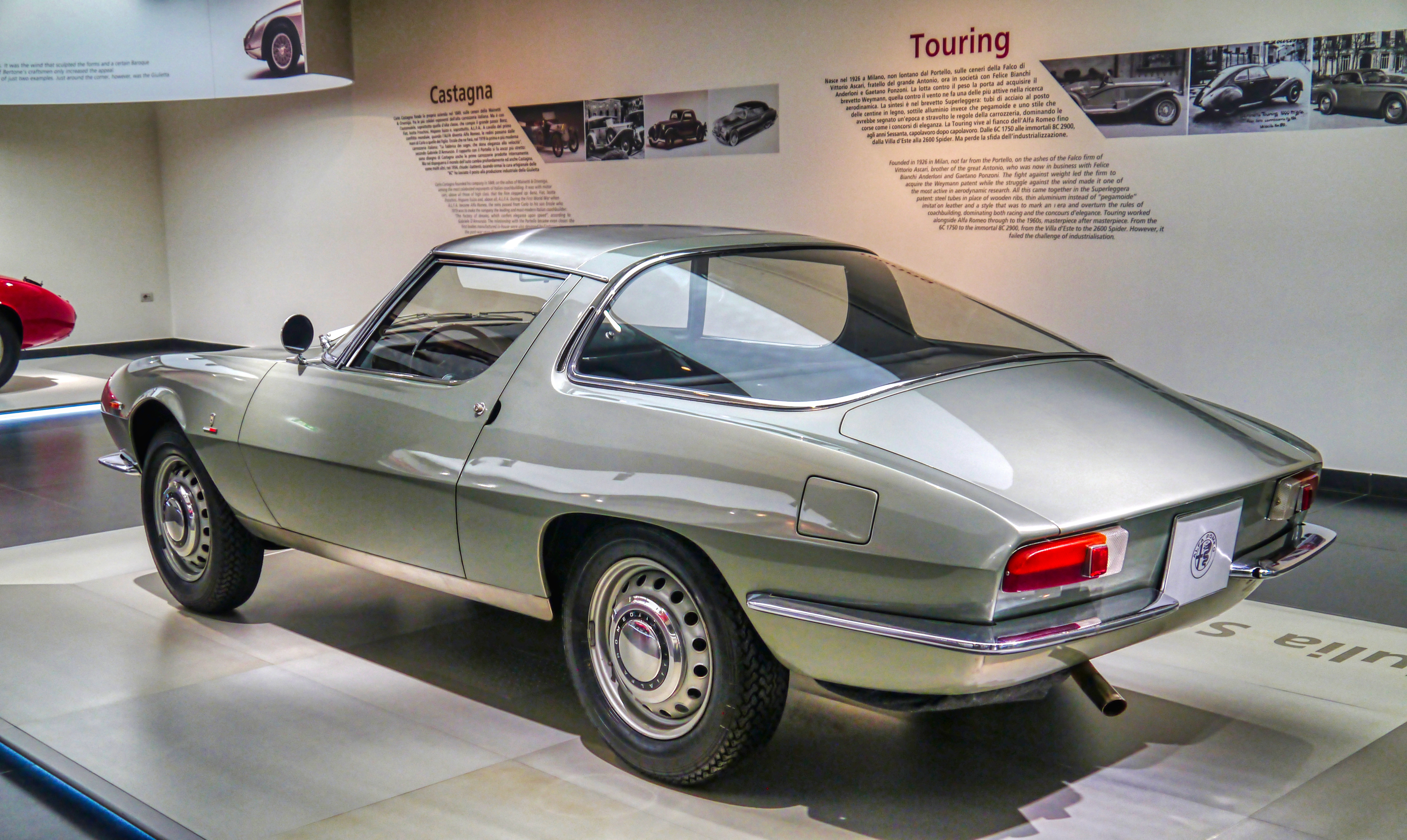

=== Tipo 101.21 ===
The Giulia series having a larger replaced the Giulietta and was introduced at the 1963 Geneva Motor Show in March. As the Giulietta name is a diminutive for Giulia in Italian, the new Giulia name was a wordplay hinting that the new car was a grown-up version of the Giulietta. The large engine allowed for a top speed of 160 km/h (99 mph). The 1,570 cc (1.6 L) engine with Weber 40 DCOE2 carburetors was shared with the Giulia Sprint Veloce and has a maximum power output of 110 hp (82 kW) at 6,500 rpm. Most of the cars have disc brakes at the front wheels. An easy way to distinguish the Giulia SS from the Giulietta SS is by the dashboard. The Giulia has a leather underside with the glovebox at a different angle than the main fascia. The dashboard in the Giulietta has sloping design and is painted body colour without a leather underside. The Side badges carried "Giulia SS" scripts.

Production ended in 1965, with one last single Sprint Speciale completed in 1966. The production totaled 1,366 cars for the Giulietta Sprint Speciale and 1,400 cars for the Giulia Sprint Speciale. 25 cars were converted to right hand drive by RuddSpeed.

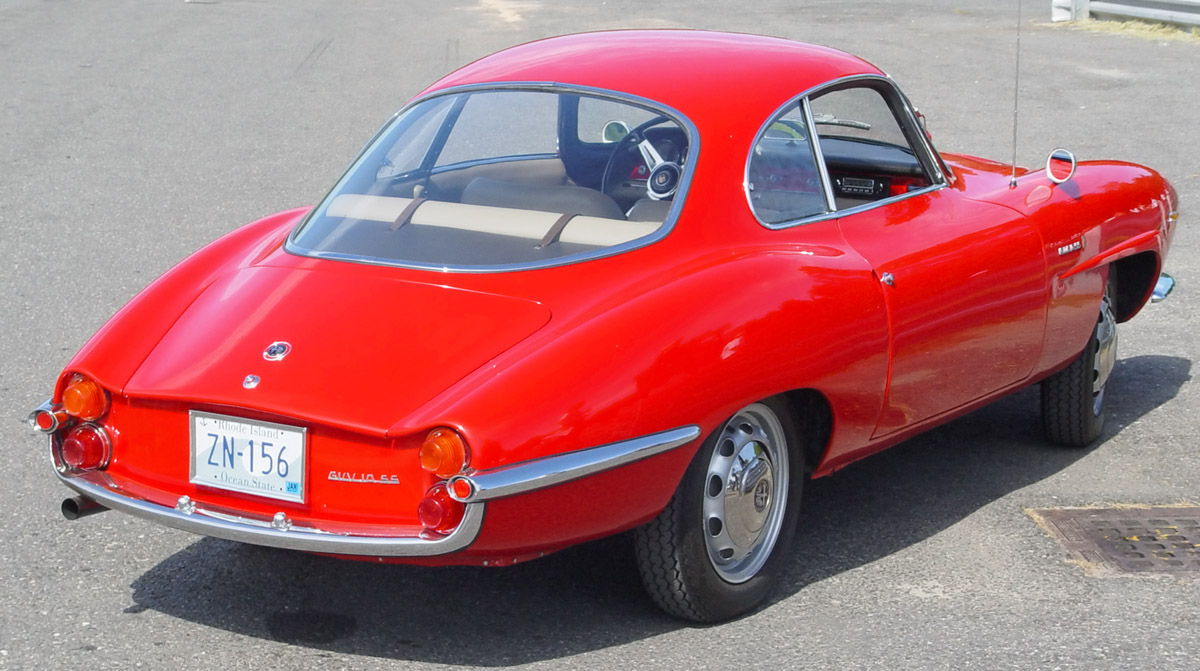
Alfa Romeo Giulia Sprint Speciale; rear view

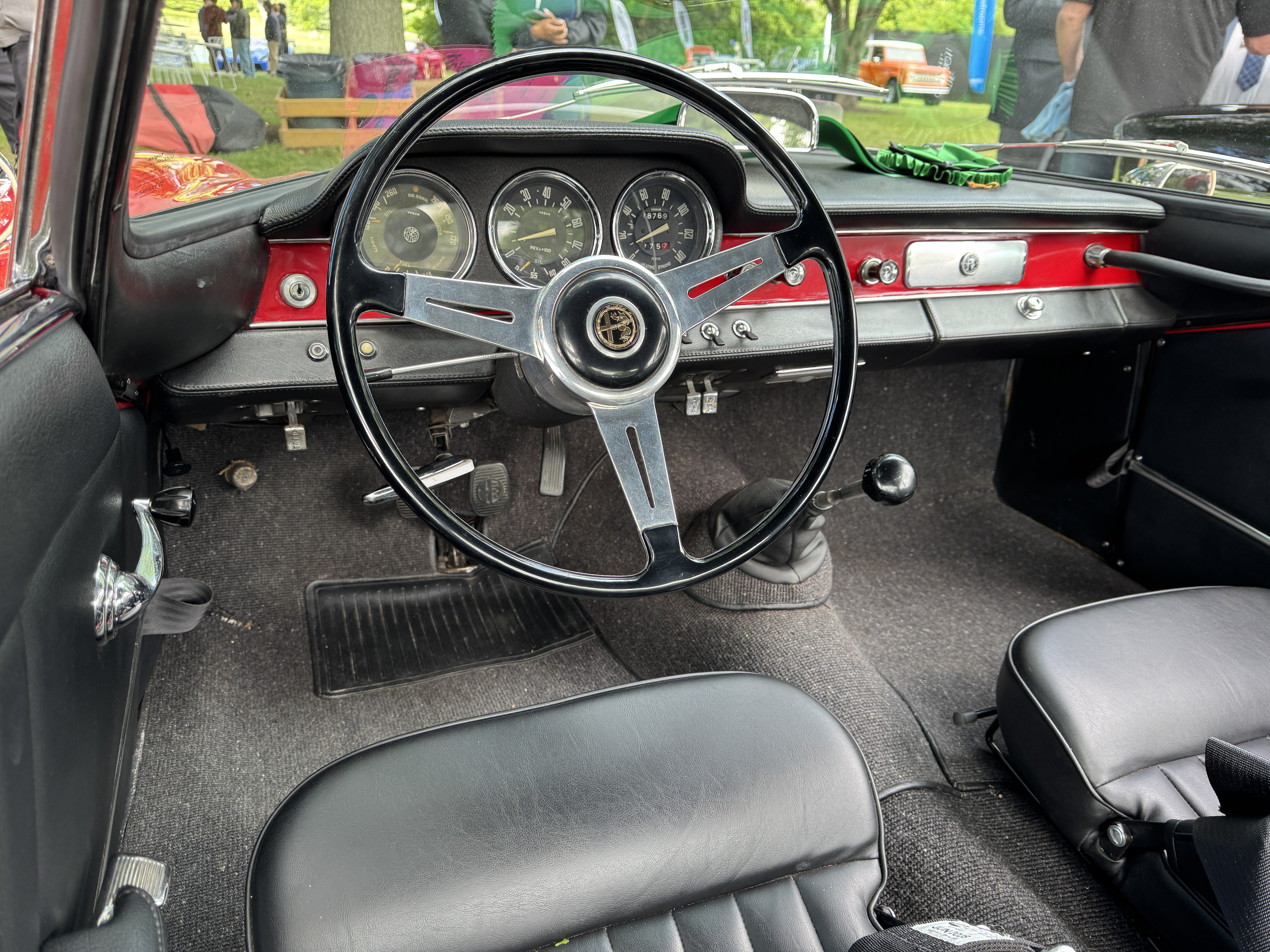
The revised dashboard of the Giulia Sprint Speciale

== See also ==
- Alfa Romeo Giulietta (750/101)
- Alfa Romeo Giulia
- SSZ Stradale
