= 1962 Daytona Continental =

Sportscar race in Daytona

Previous: First	Next: 1963
Index: Races | Winners

The 1962 Daytona Continental 3 Hour Grand Touring and Sports Car Race was an endurance race at the 6.132 km (3.8102 mile) road circuit at the Daytona International Speedway, Daytona Beach, Florida, USA, that took place on February 11, 1962. It was the first race of the 1962 World Sportscar Championship.

== Race ==
The race took place on a cold and dry day, in front of 14,000 spectators. It was won by Dan Gurney driving a Lotus 19 Monte Carlo for Frank Arciero, with an average speed of 167.534 km/h (104.101 mph). Phil Hill and Ricardo Rodríguez finished second, 48 seconds behind in their Ferrari 246 SP, while Jim Hall finished third in his Chaparral 1.

== Official results ==
Pos	Class	No	Team	Driver(s)	Chassis	Engine	Laps
1	S2.5	96	(United States) Frank Arciero	(United States) Dan Gurney	Lotus 19 Monte Carlo	Climax 2.5L I4	82
2	S2.5	1	(United States) North American Racing Team	(United States) Phil Hill (Mexico) Ricardo Rodríguez	Ferrari 246 SP	Ferrari 2.4L V6	82
3	S+5.0	66	(United States) Jim Hall	(United States) Jim Hall	Chaparral 1	Chevrolet 5.227L V8	82
4	GT3.0	18	(United States) North American Racing Team	(United Kingdom) Stirling Moss	Ferrari 250 GT SWB EXP	Ferrari 3.0L V12	80
5	S3.0	49	(United States) John Bunch	(United States) George Constantine	Ferrari 250 TR 59/60	Ferrari 3.0L V12	79
6	S+5.0	0	(United States) Peter Hand Brewery	(United States) Dick Rathmann (United States) Harry Heuer	Chaparral 1	Chevrolet 5.227L V8	79
7	S2.0	14	(United States) Holbert's Garage	(United States) Bob Holbert	Porsche 718 RSK	Porsche 1.690L Flat-4	79
8	S2.5	9	(United States) North American Racing Team	(United States) John Fulp (United States) Skip Hudson	Dino 246 S	Ferrari 2.4L V6	78
9	S2.0	16	(United States) Brumos Racing	(United States) Chuck Cassel	Porsche 718 RSK 60	Porsche 1.690L Flat-4	78
10	S2.0	99	(United States) Herb Swan	(United States) Herb Swan	Porsche 718 RSK 61	Porsche 1.687L Flat-4	78
11	S1.6	23	(United States) Robert Donner	(United States) Bob Donner	Porsche 718 RSK 61	Porsche 1.585L Flat-4	77
12	GT3.0	22	(United States) North American Racing Team	(United States) Fireball Roberts	Ferrari 250 GT SWB	Ferrari 3.0L V12	77
13	GT+5.0	11	(United States) I. Grady Davis	(United States) Dick Thompson	Chevrolet Corvette C1	Chevrolet 5.36L V8	76
14	S1.6	6	(United States) Peter DaCosta	(United States) Peter DaCosta	Porsche 718 RSK 61	Porsche 1.687L Flat-4	76
15	S3.0	50	(United States) North American Racing Team	(Mexico) Ricardo Rodríguez (Canada) Peter Ryan	Ferrari 250 TRI/61	Ferrari 3.0L V12	76
16	GT3.0	28	(Italy) Scuderia Serenissima	(Belgium) Olivier Gandebien	Ferrari 250 GT SWB	Ferrari 3.0L V12	75
17	GT4.0	62	(United States) Briggs Cunningham	(United States) Walt Hansgen	Jaguar E-Type	Jaguar 3.781L I6	75
18	GT3.0	77	(United States) North American Racing Team	(United States) Doug Thiem	Ferrari 250 GT	Ferrari 3.0L V12	75
19	GT+5.0	10	(United States) I. Grady Davis	(United States) Don Yenko	Chevrolet Corvette C1	Chevrolet 5.36L V8	75
20	GT+5.0	20	(United States) Red Vogt	(United States) Marvin Panch	Chevrolet Corvette C1	Chevrolet 5.36L V8	75
21	GT+5.0	25	(United States) Johnson Chevrolet	(United States) Dave Morgan	Chevrolet Corvette C1	Chevrolet 5.36L V8	73
22	S3.0	80	(Italy) Sorocarima Team	(Italy) Guido Lollobrigida	Maserati 300S	Maserati 3.0L I6	72
23	GT+5.0	75	(United States) Walker Motor Sales	(United States) Jack Knab	Chevrolet Corvette C1	Chevrolet 5.36L V8	71
24	GT1.3	83	(Italy) Alfa Romeo	(United States) Charlie Kolb	Alfa Romeo Giulietta Sprint Zagato	Alfa Romeo 1.29L I4	70
25	GT1.3	44	(United States) Brumos Racing	(United States) Pat Corrigan	Porsche 356B 1600	Porsche 1.587L B4	70
26	GT1.3	82	(Italy) Alfa Romeo	(United States) Paul Richards	Alfa Romeo Giulietta Sprint Zagato	Alfa Romeo 1.29L I4	70
27	GT4.0	21	(United States) Nichels Engineering	(United States) Rodger Ward	Pontiac Tempest	Pontiac 3.27L I4	67
28	GT1.3	91	(United States) Ross Durant Jr.	(United States) Ross Durant	Alfa Romeo Giulietta Sprint Zagato	Alfa Romeo 1.29L I4	65
29	GT1.3	30	(United States) Peter Berry	(United Kingdom) Jim Clark	Lotus Elite	Climax 1.216L I4	60
30	GT1.3	48	(United States) William Storey	(United States) Bill Story	Lotus Elite	Climax 1.216L I4	58
31	S+5.0	8	(United States) Bill Frick	(United States) Joe Weatherly	Lister Costin	Chevrolet 5.227L V8	57
32	GT1.3	27	(United States) Milo Vega	(United States) Milo Vega	Lotus Elite	Climax 1.216L I4	51
33	GT2.0	63	(United States) Robert Keyes	(United States) Robert Keyes	AC Ace	Bristol 1.971L I6	51
34	S5.0	51	(United States) Dr. David Lane	(United States) Anson Johnson	Lister	Chevrolet 4.414 V8	30

=== Did not finish ===
Class	No	Team	Driver(s)	Chassis	Engine	Laps	Reason
GT1.6	15	(Germany) Porsche System Engineering	(Sweden) Jo Bonnier	Porsche 356B Carrera Abarth GTL	Porsche 1.587L Flat-4	70	engine
S2.5	46	(United States) Roger Penske	(United States) Roger Penske	Cooper Monaco T57	Climax 2.5L N/A	66	oil pressure
GT3.0	7	(United Kingdom) UDT Laystall Racing Team	(United Kingdom) Innes Ireland	Ferrari 250 GT SWB	Ferrari 3.0L V12	59	brakes
S+5.0	24	(United States) Art Huttinger	(United States) Art Huttinger	Lister	Chevrolet 5.227L V8	54	unknown
GT+5.0	17	(United States) Ronny Kaplan Engineering	(United States) Bob Johnson	Chevrolet Corvette C1	Chevrolet 5.388L V8	42	unknown
GT+5.0	29	(United States) Fred Kappler	(United States) Jef Stevens	Chevrolet Corvette C1	Chevrolet 5.2L V8	37	engine
GT+5.0	35	(United States) R. D. Doane	(United States) Skip Hudson	Chevrolet Corvette C1	Chevrolet 5.332L V8	34	unknown
GT+5.0	78	(United States) John Mecom Jr.	(United States) Bob Schroeder	Chevrolet Corvette C1	Chevrolet 5.36L V8	31	unknown
S2.5	12	(United States) Rosebud Racing	(Mexico) Pedro Rodríguez	Lotus 19	Climax 2.5L N/A	28	suspension
GT1.6	47	(United States) Brumos Racing	(United States) David Lane	Porsche 356B 1600	Porsche 1.587L B4	20	unknown
GT4.0	32	(United States) Peter Berry	(United Kingdom) David Hobbs	Jaguar E-Type	Jaguar 3.781L I6	15	fuel system
GT4.0	42	(United States) Nichels Engineering	(United States) Harry Heuer	Pontiac Tempest	Pontiac 3.27L I4	14	gearbox
GT1.6	71	(United States) Bill Bencker	(United States) Bill Bencker	Porsche 356B Super 90 1600	Porsche 1.582L Flat-4	12	unknown
S3.0	5	(United States) Alan Conell Jr.	(United States) Alan Conell	Maserati Tipo 61	Ferrari 3.0L V12	7	oil pressure
GT+5.0	19	(United States) Nichels Engineering	(United States) Paul Goldsmith	Pontiac Tempest	Pontiac 3.27L I4	2	differential
GT+5.0	53	(United States) Nichels Engineering	(United States) A. J. Foyt	Pontiac Tempest	Pontiac 3.27L I4	2	engine

=== Did not start ===
Class	No	Team	Driver(s)	Chassis	Engine	Reason
GT+5.0	33	(United States) R. D. Doane	(United States) Rob Spooner	Chevrolet Corvette C1	Chevrolet 5.332L V8	unknown
S3.0	36	(United States) Bob Hurt	(United States) Bob Hurt	Ferrari 250 TR 59	Ferrari 3.0L V12	unknown
S2.0	60	(United States) Anson Johnson	(United States) Anson Johnson	Ferrari 500 TRC	Ferrari 2.0L I4	unknown
S3.0	61	(United States) Briggs Cunningham	(United States) Augie Pabst	Maserati Tipo 61	Maserati 2.894L N/A	accident in practice
