= 1962 Targa Florio =

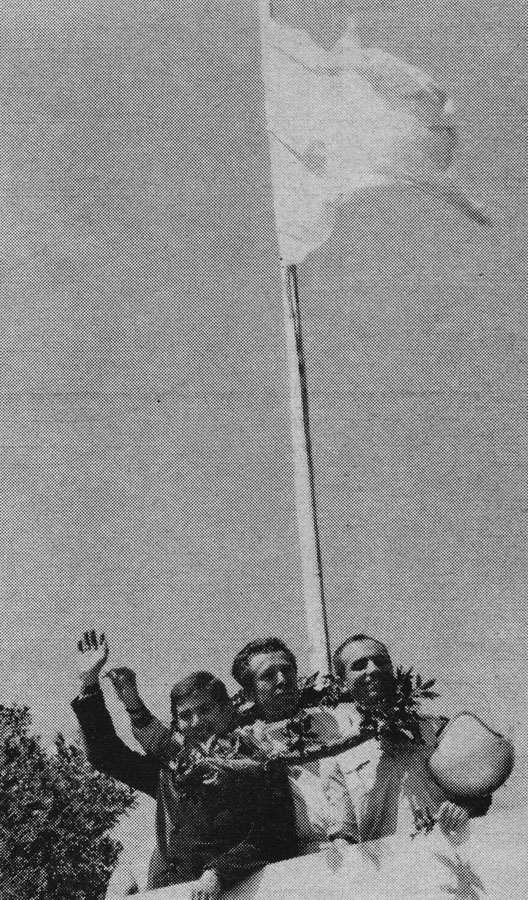
1962 winners, from left: Ricardo Rodriguez, Olivier Gendebien and Willy Mairesse

The 46° Targa Florio was a motor race which took place on 6 May 1962, on the Circuito Piccolo delle Madonie, Sicily, Italy. Like in 1961, a mid-engine V6 Ferrari won, and this time another finished second, with the best Porsche finishing only third. The race was part of the 1962 World Sportscar Championship which was contested in various categories and classes, including Grand Touring.

== Race ==
Ferrari did bring only one V12 front engine car to Sicily, a 250 GTO that was only a T-car for testing. One of the mid-engine SP chassis was fitted with a 2.6 liter V8-version of the Dino V6, but this 268 SP was crashed in practice. The two other SP cars had V6 in two sizes to compete in two classes, the 246 SP in S3.0, the 196 SP in S2.0.

Porsche had lost in 1961 because Ferrari had also adopted the mid-engine layout, but with a bigger stronger V6 engine. The flat-4 DOHC Porsche 547 engine was aging, thus the engineers were trying out a new prototype version of the 718, combining the two-litre flat-8 Type 771 engine (developed along with the 1.5 litre Porsche 753 engine for the 1962 Porsche 804 Formula 1 car, and also seen in testing for 1962 Le Mans) with the new coupé bodywork which had thus far only been used with the four-cylinder DOHC engine. The factory in Zuffenhausen, like Ferrari being busy also with the 1962 Formula One season but not comfortable with single seater racing, outsourced the effort for the Targa, which usually included weeks of practise drives on the public roads in Sicily, to Count Volpi's Scuderia SSS Republica di Venezia. As Mercedes had done in the 1920s wins, some of the cars were painted red instead of the German white or silver. Worries about reliability, which had cost them the 1961 race, were another reason. The second car was driven by Graham Hill and Dan Gurney, but the latter crashed it after a brake failure. The other prototype car finished in third place but also had brake problems as Porsche were still coming to grips with disc brakes.

Ferrari dominated most of the 1962 race, with a double victory for the SP sportscars and with two privateer GT finishing fourth and fifth. Ferrari won both sports car and the GT3.0 trophies, with Porsche winning the GT1.6 category with a Carrera 1600.

== Official Classification ==
Class Winners are in Bold text.

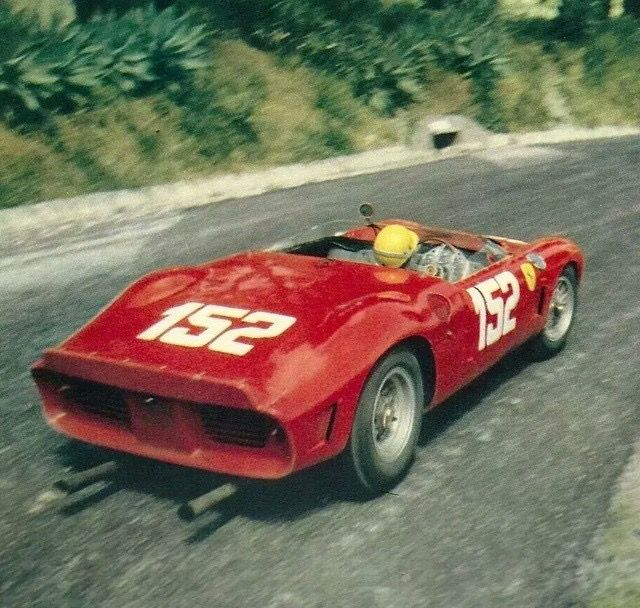
No. 152 Ferrari 246SP

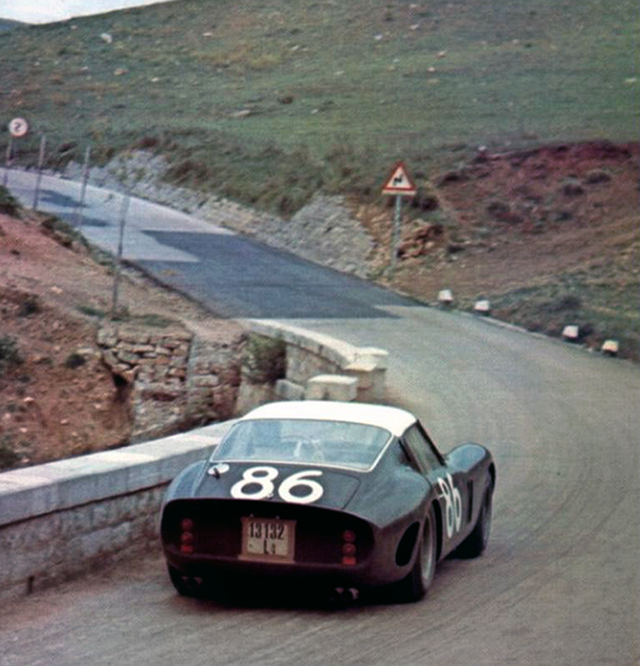
No. 86 Ferrari 250GT

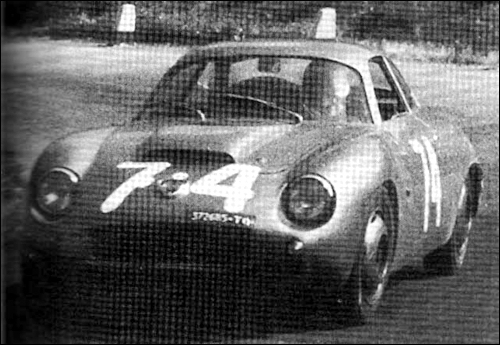
No. 74 Lancia

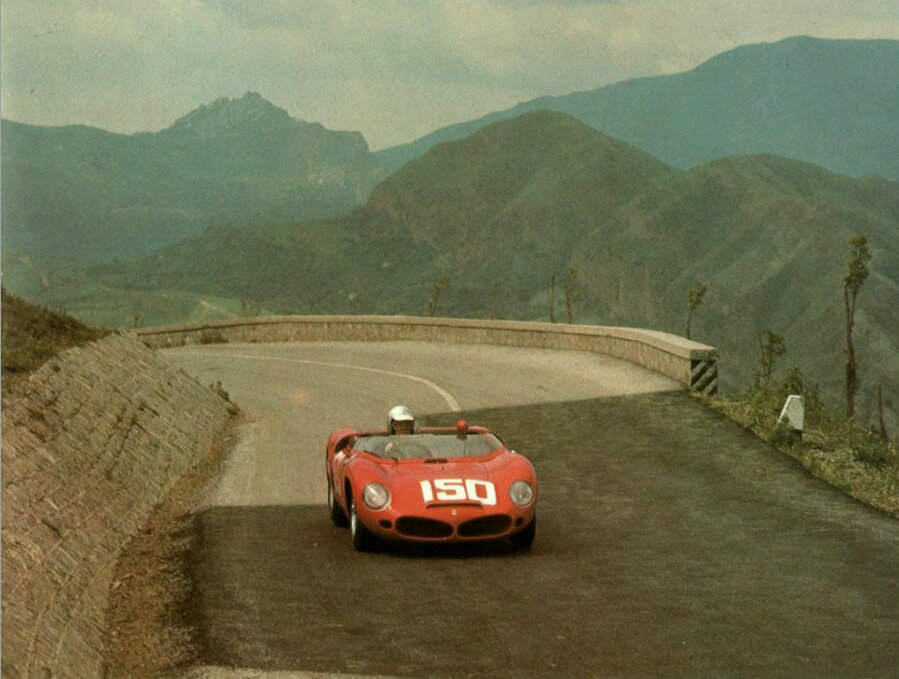
No. 150 Ferrari 268SP

Pos	No	Class	Driver		Entrant	Chassis	Time Laps
1st	**152**	**S3.0**	(Belgium) **Willy Mairesse/Olivier Gendebien**	(Mexico) **Ricardo Rodriguez**	**Scuderia Ferrari**	**Ferrari 246 SP**	**7:02'56.3**, 10
2nd	**120**	**S2.0**	(Italy) **Giancarlo Baghetti**	(Italy) **Lorenzo Bandini**	**Scuderia Ferrari**	**Ferrari 196 SP**	**7:14'24.0**, 10
3rd	**108**	**P2.0**	(Sweden) **Joakim Bonnier**	(Italy) **Nino Vaccarella**	**Scuderia SSS Republica di Venezia**	**Porsche 718 GTR Coupé**	**7:17'20.0**, 10
4th	**86**	**GT3.0**	(Italy) **Giorgio Scarlatti**	(Italy) **Pietro Ferraro**	**San Marco**	**Ferrari 250 GTO**	**7:22'08.0**, 10
5th	92	GT3.0	(France) Roger Delageneste	(France) Jean Rolland		Ferrari 250 GT SWB	7:44'33.0, 10
6th	**42**	**GT1.6**	(West Germany) **Hans Herrmann**	(West Germany) **Herbert Linge**	**Scuderia SSS Republica di Venezia**	**Porsche 356B Carrera Abarth GTL**	**7:46'26.0**, 10
7th	**14**	**GT1.3**	(Italy) **Vito Coco**	(Italy) **Salvatore Arena**	**Scuderia Etna**	**Alfa Romeo Giulietta Sprint Zagato**	**7:50'36.0**, 10
8th	**74**	**GT2.5**	(Italy) **Piero Frescobaldi**	(Italy) **Alessandro Federico**	**Jolly Club**	**Lancia Flaminia Sport Zagato**	**7:51'38.0**, 10
9th	56	GT1.3	(Italy) Alfonso Thiele	(France) Jean Guichet	Scuderia Sant' Ambroeus	Alfa Romeo Giulietta Sprint Zagato	7:56'39.0, 10
10th	44	GT1.6	(Italy) Antonio Pucci	(West Germany) Edgar Barth	Scuderia SSS Republica di Venezia	Porsche 356B Carrera Abarth GTL	8:00'05.0, 10
11th	34	GT1.3	(Italy) Giuseppe Virgilio	(Italy) Giuseppe Sciacchitano	Scuderia Etna	Alfa Romeo Giulietta Sprint Zagato	8:07'05.0, 10
12th	8	GT1.3	(Italy) Francesco Susinno	(Italy) Giulio Pernice	Scuderia Etna	Alfa Romeo Giulietta Sprint Veloce	8:21'56.0, 10
13th	52	GT1.6	(Italy) Alfonso Vella	(Italy) Pietro Termini	Balarm	Porsche 356B Carrera	8:22'50.0, 10
14th	6	GT1.3	(Italy) Girolamo Capra	(Italy) Giuseppe Dalla Torre	Scuderia Sant' Ambroeus	Alfa Romeo Giulietta Sprint Veloce	8:25'27.0, 10
15th	4	GT1.3	(Italy) Giancarlo Sala	(Italy) Sergio Pedretti ("Kim")	Scuderia Sant' Ambroeus	Alfa Romeo Giulietta Sprint Veloce	8:26'44.0, 10
16th	40	GT1.6	(Italy) Raffaello Ciarpaglini	(Italy) Ottavio Prandoni	Scuderia Ambrosiana	Porsche 356B Carrera Reutter	8:39'13.3, 10
17th	28	GT1.3	(Italy) Angelo Bonaccorsi	(Italy) Vito Sabbia	Scuderia Etna	Alfa Romeo Giulietta Sprint Veloce	8:41'10.2, 10
18th	10	GT1.3	(Italy) Franco Tagliavia	(Italy) Guido Garufi		Alfa Romeo Giulietta Sprint Veloce	8:53'21.0, 10
19th	82	GT3.0	(Italy) Umberto de Bonis	(Italy) Roberto Fusina		250 GT California Spyder SWB	8:55'56.2, 10
20th	64	GT2.0	(Italy) Giuseppe Ramirez	(Italy) Luigi Ramirez		Lancia Aurelia B20	9:34'12.0, 10

World Sportscar Championship
Previous race: 12 Hours of Sebring	1962 season	Next race: ADAC 1000km Nürburgring
