= Ferrari SP =

1960s sports prototype racing car series

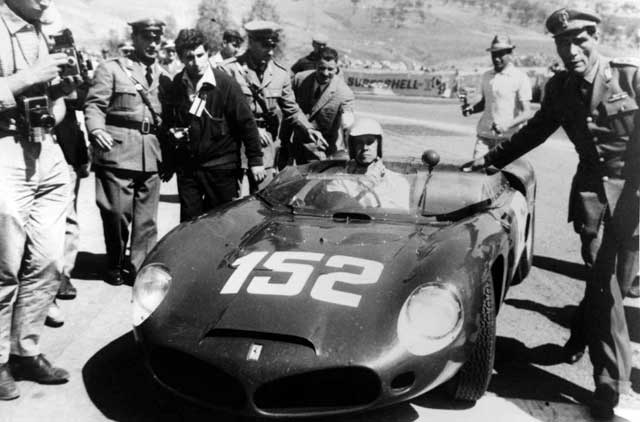
- 1961 Ferrari 246 SP

Overview
- Manufacturer: Ferrari
- Also called: Ferrari Dino SP
- Production: 1961–1962
- Designer: Carrozzeria Fantuzzi

Body and chassis
- Body style: Spyder
- Layout: Rear mid-engine, rear-wheel-drive

Powertrain
- Engine: Dino 60° & 65° V6; Chiti 90° V8
- Transmission: 5-speed manual

Dimensions
- Wheelbase: 2,320 mm (91.3 in)

Chronology
- Predecessor: Dino 246 S
- Successor: Ferrari P; Dino 166 P

The Ferrari SP (also known as the Ferrari Dino SP) was a series of Italian sports prototype racing cars produced by Ferrari during the early 1960s. All featured a rear mid-engine layout, a first for a Ferrari sports car. Major racing accolades include the 1962 European Hill Climb Championship, two overall Targa Florio victories, in 1961 and 1962, and "1962 Coupe des Sports" title.

At first the SP-series used Vittorio Jano-designed, V6 Dino engines in both SOHC 60° and DOHC 65° forms. Later, Ferrari introduced a new SOHC 90° V8 engine designed by Carlo Chiti. All used dry sump lubrication and were mated to a 5-speed manual transmission.

In total only six chassis were produced with various engine configurations. Many times they were modified and converted into a different specification. The tubular steel chassis, tipo 561, featured all-round independent suspension and disc brakes. All shared the same wheelbase and open body style with some variations.

The rear mid-engine layout experience was soon carried over to the V12-powered Ferrari P-series of sports prototypes. They arrived in 1963. Later, by 1965, Ferrari introduced their first mid-engined Dino sports prototype, the 166 P, powered by a V6 engine. The Chiti V8 engine did not carry over to any successor.

== 246 SP ==
Ferrari 246 SP
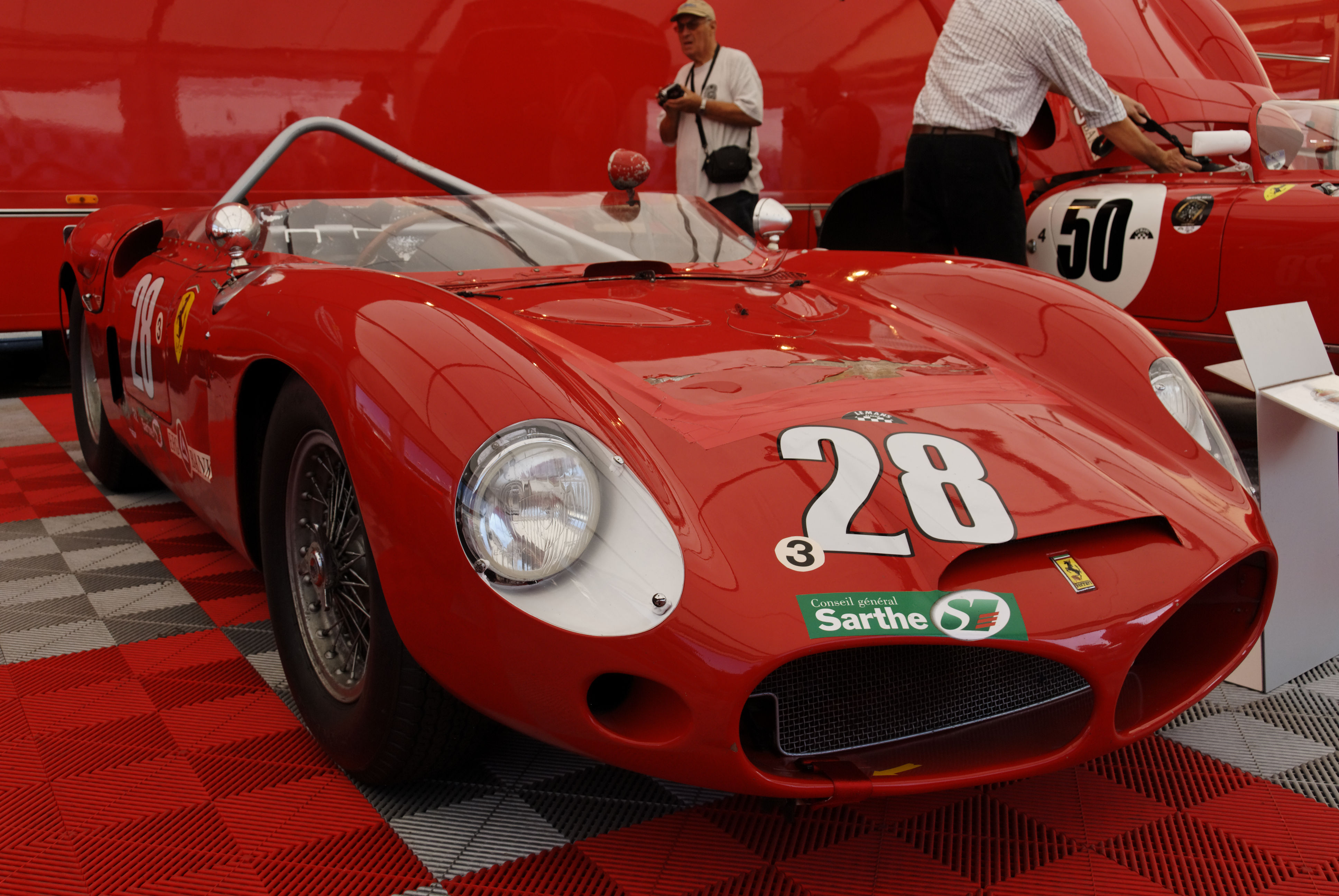

Overview
- Also called: Ferrari Dino 246 SP
- Production: 1961; 2 produced

Powertrain
- Engine: 2.4 L (2417.33 cc) Tipo 171S Dino 65° V6
- Power output: 270 PS

Dimensions
- Curb weight: 590 kg (1,301 lb) (dry)

At the 1961 special press conference, Ferrari unveiled their first mid-engined sports car, the Ferrari 246 SP. Although the front-engined 250 Testa Rossa had many racing successes during the late 1950s, the emergence of rear engine competitors in Grand Prix and sports car racing indicated that Ferrari required new design to stay competitive. Enzo Ferrari publicly denied in January 1959 that a rear engine car was in the works, however during this same year he privately tasked Carlo Chiti with developing both a rear engine Formula One car and a rear engine sports car, to be introduced by the 1961 racing season. Chiti decided Jano's existing 2.4 litre 65° Dino V6 design was suitable for use in both of these designs, due to its light weight and compact size. Development work proceeded through 1960 and early 1961, with the 246 SP completed in time for the 13 February 1961 press conference where it was introduced to the public. The model proved its capabilities at the 1961 Targa Florio, which Wolfgang von Trips and Olivier Gendebien had won outright. With this the 246 SP scored one more point for the 1961 World Sportscar Championship for Ferrari. For the 1962 World Sportscar Championship in the Sportscar class cars under 3000 cc, the 246 SP won two out of three rounds, including the 1962 Targa Florio and "1962 Coupe des Sports" title for Ferrari. Only two cars were produced (chassis 0790 and 0796) and both were later converted into other types, with 0790 becoming a 196 SP in early 1963 and 0796 becoming a 250 P test mule before being destroyed in a crash.

=== Bodywork ===
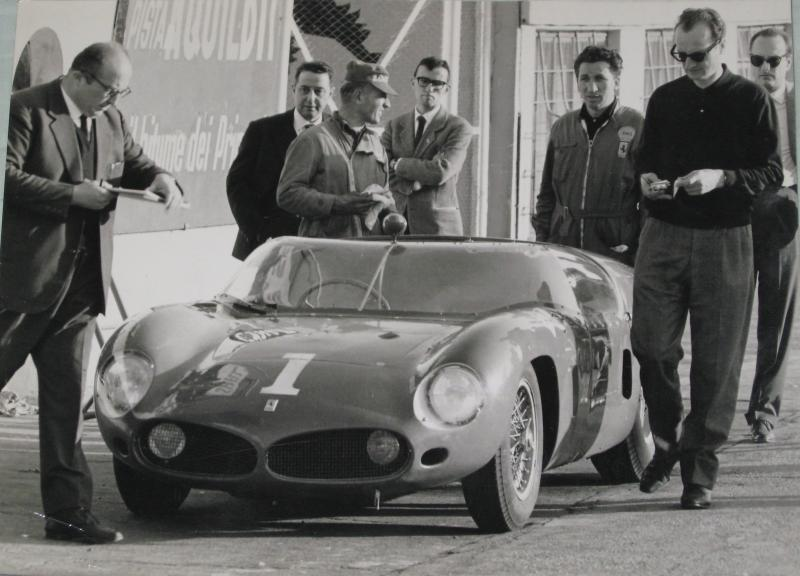
Early tests of original 246 SP on Monza track in March 1961, with tail fin already removed. Carlo Chiti visible in front of the car.

The 246 SP's bodywork was a collaboration between Carlo Chiti and Medardo Fantuzzi, the owner of the Carrozzeria Fantuzzi. During the design process, solutions to reduce drag were tested in a wind tunnel. This resulted in the adoption of several new, innovative features, including a very low bonnet, high rear bodywork flush with the windscreen top and a vertical tail fin. A prominent detail were the two apertures, or air intakes in the front of the car. This solution was concurrently introduced on the 1961 Ferrari 156 Formula One car, dubbed the "sharknose," and on the 1961 250 TRI61. This front end styling had first appeared on a trio of Maserati 250Fs that Fantuzzi re-bodied in 1958 for racer Ross Jensen and team owner Temple Buell (son of the architect with the same name). Fantuzzi's suggestion that the twin intakes would improve air penetration was confirmed by Chiti's wind tunnel testing, leading to the adoption of this style throughout Ferrari's 1961 racing cars.

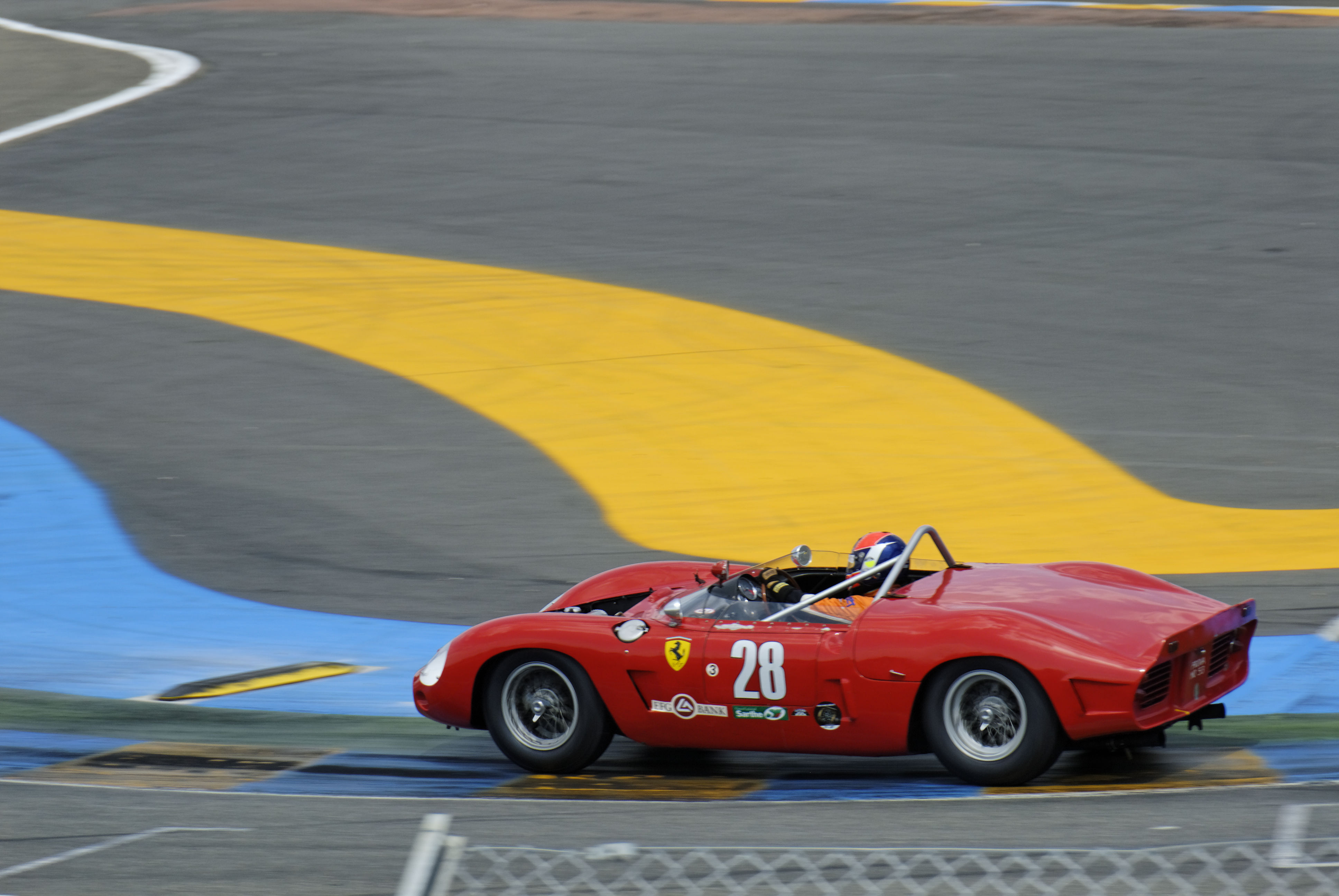
Ferrari 246 SP during 2010 Le Mans Classic

The bodywork was hand-shaped in Fantuzzi's workshop from 22 gauge aluminium sheet over wire forms. Major panels were designed to be detachable for easy maintenance access. Fantuzzi assigned one individual worker to oversee construction of each body shell. This division of labor, coupled with the use of traditional hand-built fabrication, resulted in slight differences between individual bodies.

During the course of early testing by Wolfgang von Trips and Ritchie Ginther, Ferrari engineers discovered that the aerodynamics of the body caused instability at high speeds. This aerodynamic instability was thought to be the cause of a dramatic rollover crash during testing at Modena Autodrome, which resulted in bruising for test driver von Trips and minor cosmetic damage to the vehicle. The issue was solved by the removal of the vertical fin seen at the car's introduction and the addition of a 5 inches (13 cm) tall rear spoiler, suggested by Ginther based on his wartime experience with aircraft.

For the 1962 racing season, Ferrari introduced a slightly changed body style for all Dino SP cars, including the two 246 SPs which were re-bodied. All windscreens and rear bodywork were lowered in response to an FIA regulation change, improving aerodynamics and driver visibility. Chassis 0796 received a body with a slightly longer front end (often called the "long-nose" style), matching those of the newer SP-series cars, however 0790 remained with the earlier "short-nose" front bodywork.

Numerous other body modifications were performed during the course of the 246 SP's competition career, including many changes in intake/vent configuration to optimize air flow to the engine, brakes and driver. All SPs retained the "sharknose" front end until 1963, when even the 246 SPs were converted to a single front intake style. Windshield heights were also changed and side windows modified and/or removed, in order to improve visibility and cockpit temperatures. Despite these improvements, the 246 SP gained a reputation for having an extremely hot cockpit, with von Trips reportedly remarking "You could grow tomatoes in the cockpit during a seven-hour race."

=== Engine and transmission ===
The engine, mounted longitudinally and amidships, was a Tipo 171S 65° Dino V6 unit based on the earlier Tipo 143 used in the 246 F1. The block and heads were cast from Silumin alloy. The total capacity of 2,417.33 cc (2.4 L; 147.5 cu in) from 85 by 71 mm (3.3 by 2.8 in) of bore and stroke was the same as the engines used in the 246 F1 and the 1960 Dino 246 S. The 65° engine had twin overhead camshafts per cylinder bank driven by a timing chain, two valves per cylinder, and a 9.8:1 compression ratio. Resulting power was 270 PS (199 kW; 266 hp) at 8000 rpm. The engine was fed by three Weber 42DCN carburettors and used two 14mm Marchal spark plugs per cylinder with two coils and Magnetti Marelli distributors. A dry sump lubrication system was used, with pumps for oil pressure/scavenging driven off the cams. The oil cooler and reservoir were located in the front of the vehicle. Two engine short blocks were manufactured for each 246 SP chassis, with a single set of cylinder heads swapped between them as needed.

The 246 SP used a 5 speed transaxle designed by Engineer Giorgio Salvarani, similar to that used in the 156 F1. It was mounted to the rear of the car, behind the engine. It integrated in a compact package 5 straight cut, non-synchromesh forward gears, one reverse gear, a hydraulically actuated multi-plate clutch, a ZF-style limited slip differential and mountings for inboard disc brakes. This transmission was shared among all Dino SP series cars.

=== Chassis, suspension and brakes ===
The 246 SP chassis was a tubular space frame constructed from round steel tubing by oxygen-acetylene welding. Durability was prioritized over weight savings during chassis design and construction, as Ferrari engineers attempted to ensure reliability during harsh endurance races. Fully independent double wishbone suspension was used on all four corners, with coil springs and Koni shock absorbers. The suspension design was extremely similar to that of the 156 F1. Rack and pinon steering was also used, a new technology for Ferrari.

Disc brakes manufactured by Dunlop were used on both the front and rear. Front and rear discs were both 12 inches (30 cm) in diameter. Front discs were conventionally mounted outboard at the hub uprights, while the rear brakes were mounted inboard at the transaxle.

=== Racing ===
==== Chassis 0790 ====
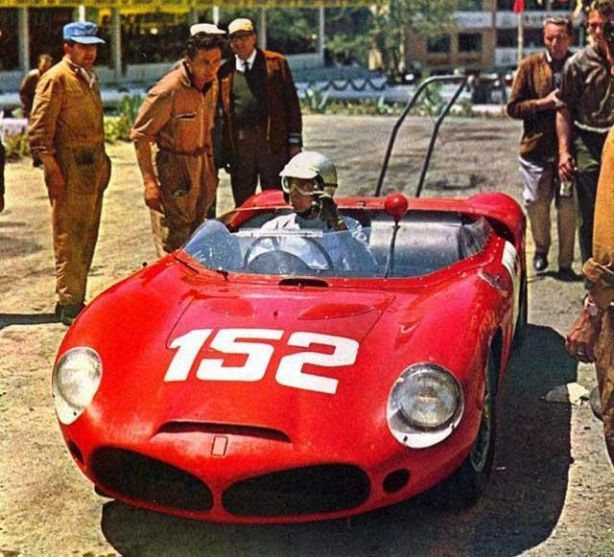
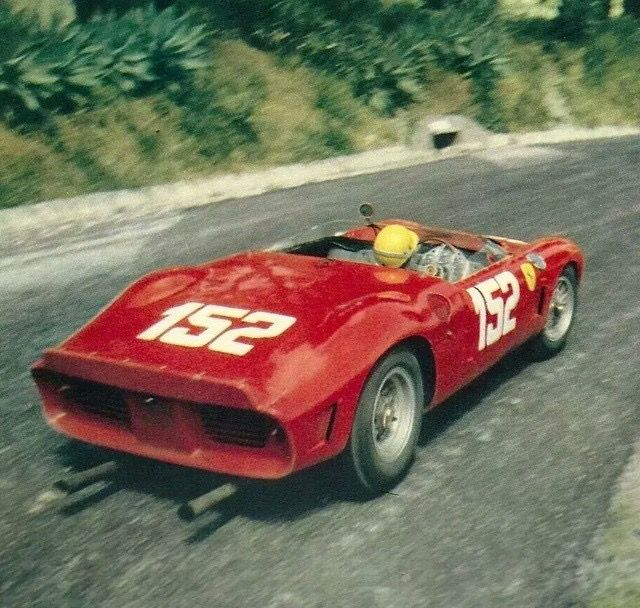
Willy Mairesse, Rodriguez and Gendebien win 1962 Targa Florio in 246 SP s/n 0796

The first example produced, s/n 0790 was presented at the 1961 press conference. Its first outing after a couple of tests was the 12 Hours of Sebring, with Richie Ginther and Wolfgang von Trips driving. Although the car performed well, comfortably leading the field 3 hours into the race, it did not finish due to von Trips breaking a steering arm after jumping a curb and going off-track. The first major victory for the car and its series came at the 1961 Targa Florio race. The winning team consisted of Wolfgang von Trips, Richie Ginther and Olivier Gendebien. Later, the same trio scored a third place in the 1000 km Nürburgring despite engine and handling issues caused by wet, cold weather. The 246 SP 0790 was entered in the 1961 24 Hours of Le Mans with Ginther and von Trips as drivers. They managed to set the fastest lap in practice but retired when the car ran out of fuel on the Mulsanne straight due to a miscalculation. Later the same year, another broken steering component during practice prevented Richie Ginther and Giancarlo Baghetti from completing the 4 Hours of Pescara.

1962 started slowly, when an engine problem hindered the Rodriguez brothers from completing the 12 Hours of Sebring, in which they represented the N.A.R.T. team. Later in May, Phil Hill and Olivier Gendebien took a first place at the 1000 km Nürburgring, again under rainy conditions. 0790 was then airfreighted to Mosport Park to compete in the Players 200 Trophy race with driver Innes Ireland. Ireland retired on lap 13 with engine problems. In August, Mike Parkes won the Guards Trophy at the Brands Hatch, driving 0790 against Innes Ireland's Lotus 19. By 1963, 0790 was converted into 196 SP specification.

==== Chassis 0796 ====
The second car of the series, s/n 0796, was also built in 1961. It competed alongside 0790 in the 1961 Targa Florio, driven by Phil Hill and Olivier Gendebien, but crashed during the first lap with Hill driving. After the car was re-bodied, Hill and von Trips competed at the 1961 1000 km Nürburgring, but again retired after a crash with Hill at the wheel. 0796 was not seen in competition until the following season.

In 1962 Phil Hill and Ricardo Rodríguez drove 0796 for N.A.R.T. at the 3 Hours of Daytona Continental, finishing second. Later the same year, Rodriguez and Gendebien aided by Willy Mairesse won in 0796 at the Targa Florio. Afterwards the car was extensively modified for its Le Mas participation, which it entered but did not finish due to a transmission failure. The Rodriguez brothers retired after 14 hours. By the end of the year 0796 was used as a development mule for the 250 P, having a 3.0-litre V12 engine installed amidships on an extended chassis.

== 196 SP ==
Ferrari 196 SP
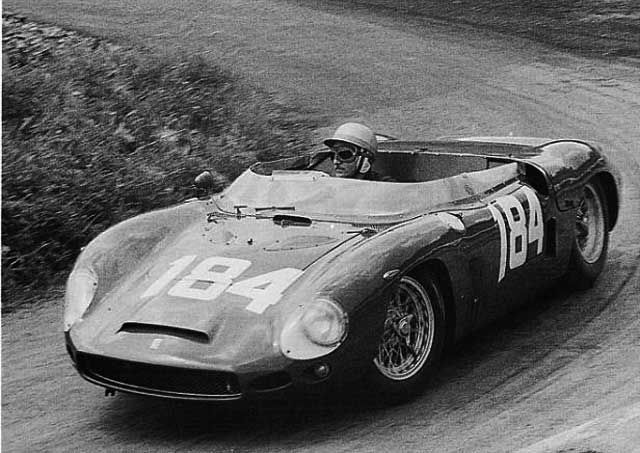
- 196 SP driven by Edoardo Lualdi-Gabardi at 1963 Targa Florio. Visible is the single intake front bodywork characteristic of post-1963 SP series cars.

Overview
- Also called: Ferrari Dino 196 SP
- Production: 1962–1963; 4 made (including 3 converted)

Powertrain
- Engine: 2.0 L (1983.72 cc) Tipo 190 Dino 60° V6
- Power output: 210 PS

Dimensions
- Curb weight: 600 kg (1,323 lb) (dry)

The 1962 Ferrari 196 SP was a smaller-engined variation on the original 246 SP design, equipped with a 2.0-litre, SOHC 60° V6 Tipo 190 engine. The 5 speed transmission, chassis, brakes and suspension were all unchanged from the 246 SP. The 196 SP was introduced at Ferrari's 24 February 1962 press conference alongside the 248 SP, 286 SP, the 250 GTO and the 156 F1.

At the model's introduction in 1962, a single 196 SP chassis (s/n 0804) existed. By 1963 chassis 0790, 0802 and 0806 were converted to 196 SP specification, resulting in a total of four of this type made. Thanks to the 196 SP and driver Ludovico Scarfiotti, Ferrari claimed the 1962 European Hill Climb Championship in the Sports Cars class. Scuderia Ferrari 196 SPs also claimed two 2,000 cc class wins at the 1962 and 1963 Targa Florio.

=== Specifications ===
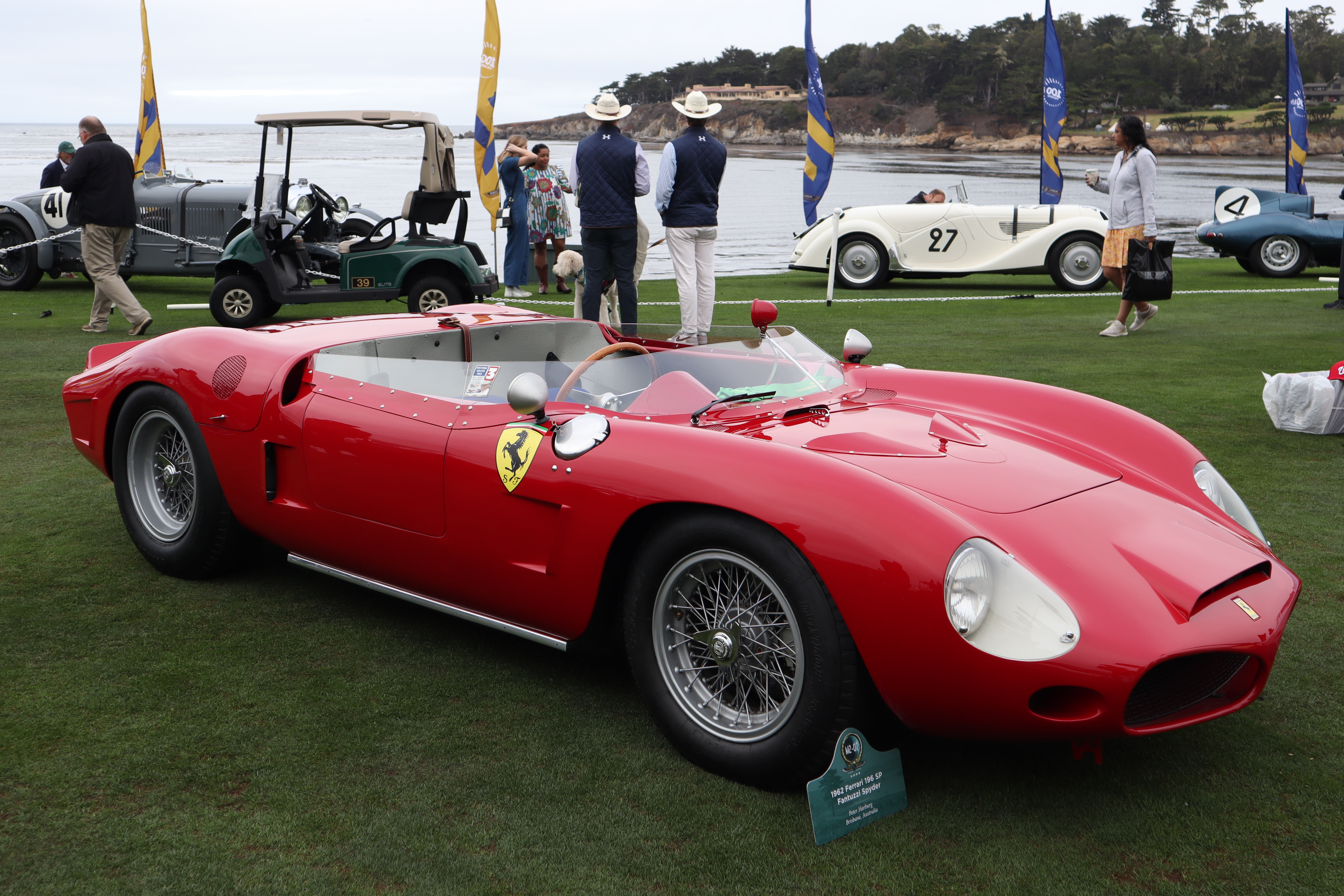
196 SP, chassis 0806, at the 2022 Pebble Beach Concours d'Elegance.

The 2.0-litre V6 engine was mounted in the middle of the car, at its rear. The 60° angle engine was configured with only a single overhead camshaft and two valves per cylinder. Bore and stroke were 77 by 71 mm (3.0 by 2.8 in) respectively, and the resulting capacity was 1,983.72 cc (2.0 L; 121.1 cu in). Those measurements were identical to those of the Dino 196 S engine, from which this engine was heavily derived. The power output was 210 PS (154 kW; 207 hp) at 7500 rpm, thanks to three Weber 42DCN carburettors and a 9.8:1 compression ratio. The engine used a single spark plug with two ignition coils.

All SP series models introduced in 1962, including the first 196 SP, were initially fitted with Fantuzzi bodywork in the style of the later "long-nose" 246 SP bodies. This included the distinctive twin front air intakes first seen in 1961 and the low windscreen, slightly longer front, and lower rear bodywork that distinguished the later 1962 bodies from the original 1961 246 SP bodies. Later in 1963, SP series cars raced by Scuderia Ferrari were converted to a single front air intake. Some 196 SPs have since been converted back to twin front intake bodywork.

=== Racing ===
==== Chassis 0804 ====
The chassis s/n 0804 was the only original Ferrari 196 SP. In 1962, it was entered at the Targa Florio race. Lorenzo Bandini and Giancarlo Baghetti finished second overall, winning the 2,000cc class. Later in May 1962, the same duo contested the 1000 km Nürburgring but did not finish the race after the engine sump plate cracked.

Ferrari decided to compete in 1962 European Hill Climb Championship with a 196 SP. Chassis 0804 was loaned to Scuderia Sant'Ambroeus along with driver Ludovico Scarfiotti. As Scuderia Sant'Ambroeus was managed by the Ferrari sporting director Eugenio Dragoni and factory personnel were used for race support, this was a Scuderia Ferrari entry in all but name. Scarfiotti won five of the six hillclimb races the team entered between June and August, against competition including Porsche drivers Heini Walter and Jan Greger. These results allowed Scuderia Sant'Ambroeus and therefore Ferrari to win the 1962 European Hill Climb championship title.

In November 1962, 0804 was sold to NART and subsequently resold to an independent racing driver named Buck Fulp. Fulp raced the car at several events during the December 1962 Nassau Trophy Races. He finished first at the "5 Lap Governor's Trophy under 2-litres heat" and fourth overall (second in class) at the "17 Lap Governor's Trophy". He failed to finish the main Nassau Trophy race, but was classified 34th overall in the race results.

==== Other chassis ====
The s/n 0802 was converted into the 196 SP specification in 1962, after being rebuilt from an accident. It had previously been configured as a 286 SP and a 268 SP. In 1963, the car was entered by Scuderia Ferrari in the Targa Florio, driven by Lorenzo Bandini, Ludovico Scarfiotti and Willy Mairesse. They finished second place overall, also scoring a class win.

The V8-powered 268 SP s/n 0806, was also converted into a 196 SP. In 1963 the car was raced by Doug Thiem in the US in various races under the USRRC series. At the 1963 Bahamas Speed Week, Bob Grossman drove the 196 SP to a class win in Sport 2.0 category in the 25 Lap Governor's Trophy, being seventh overall. Later during the same meeting, he finished 15th overall and second in class at the Nassau Trophy. In 1964, Tibor von Imrey used the car in the SCCA series.

The last of the 196 SP race cars was converted from a 246 SP chassis, s/n 0790. It would also be the last of the SP-series cars as the conversion took place in 1963. Edoardo Lualdi-Gabardi and Ugo Bini contested the Targa Florio of the same year, to no avail. Driving for the Scuderia Sant'Ambroeus, Lualdi-Gabardi won six hillclimb races out of twelve he entered in 1963. At the challenging Trento-Bondone hillclimb he scored a respectable sixth place. In 1964, Leandro Terra raced 0790 and won the Vermicino-Rocca di Papa hillclimb. Then he entered the Targa Florio with Cesare Toppetti but did not finish it. His last race in the 196 SP was with a fourth place at the GP Campagnano on Vallelunga.

== 286 SP ==
Ferrari 286 SP

Overview
- Also called: Ferrari Dino 286 SP
- Production: 1962; 1 produced

Powertrain
- Engine: 2.9 L (2862.78 cc) Dino 60° V6
- Power output: 260 PS

Dimensions
- Curb weight: 620 kg (1,367 lb) (dry)

The Ferrari 286 SP was the second model to make its debut at the 1962 press conference and was similar to the 196 SP. Like the 196 SP and the revised 1962 246 SP, it had revised bodywork with a redesigned windscreen and tail to comply with new regulations.

Only one example was produced, but never raced. S/n 0802 was presented to the press in February and converted into the 268 SP by May, the same year. The 286 SP had no successor because the large-capacity V6 was soon discarded in favour of the new Chiti-designed V8 engines, that could deliver similar performance.

=== Specifications ===
The single overhead camshaft, 60° Dino V6 engine received a wider bore and longer stroke at 90 by 75 mm (3.5 by 3.0 in) respectively. The resulting total capacity was 2,862.78 cc (2.9 L; 174.7 cu in). Those measurements did not exist on any previous Dino-engined model. A compression ratio of 9.5:1 combined with three Weber 42DCN carburettors helped produce a power output of 260 PS (191 kW; 256 hp) at 6800 rpm. Also a single spark plug per cylinder with a single coil were used.

== 248 SP ==
Ferrari 248 SP
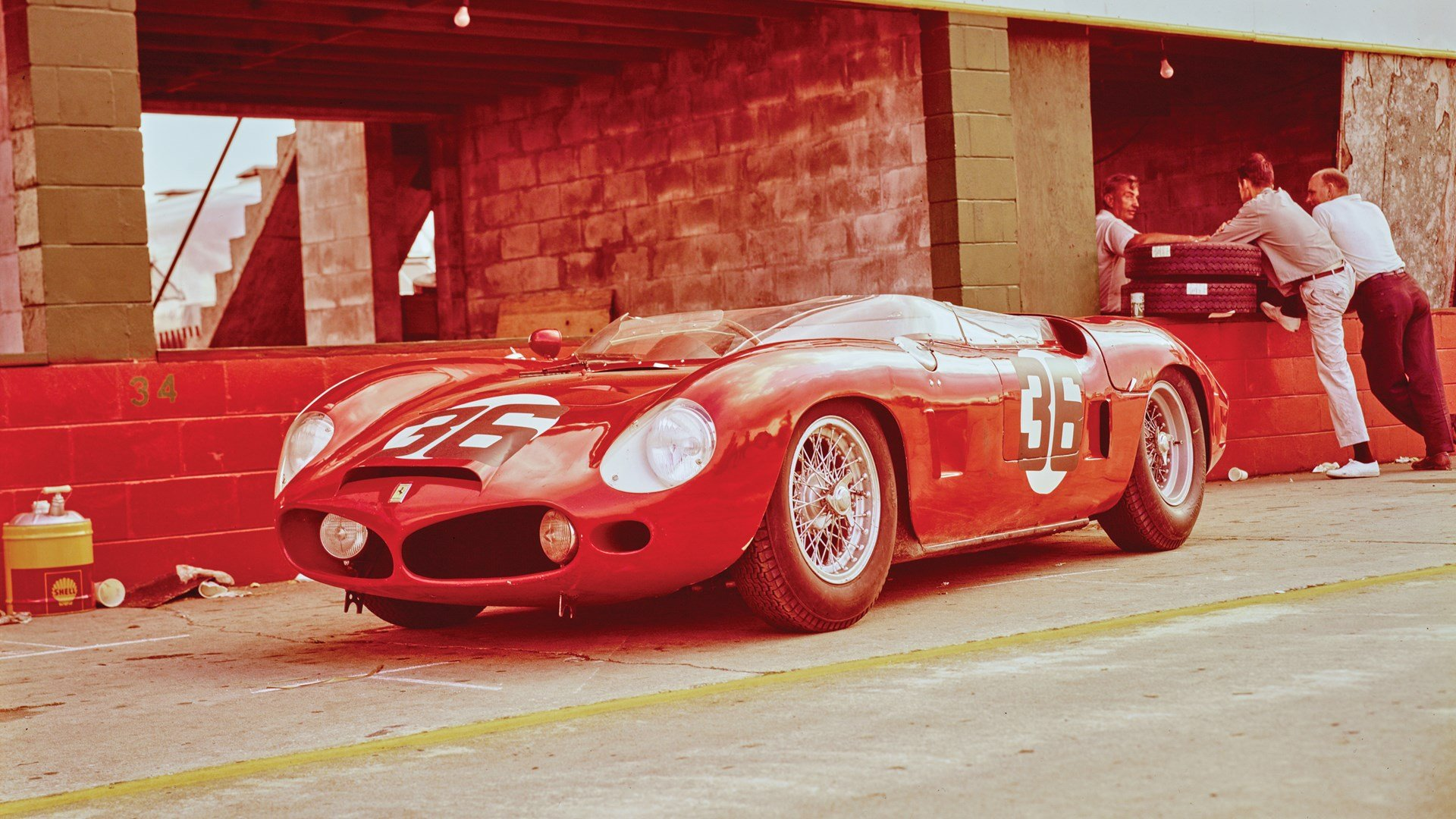

Overview
- Also called: Ferrari Dino 248 SP
- Production: 1962; 2 produced

Powertrain
- Engine: 2.5 L (2458.70 cc) Tipo 199 Chiti 90° V8
- Power output: 250 PS

Dimensions
- Curb weight: 640 kg (1,411 lb) (dry)

The Ferrari 248 SP was the third new variation of the SP series introduced at the 1962 press conference. The 248 SP was fitted with a single overhead camshaft, 2.4-litre V8 engine, this time fed by four twin-choke Weber carburettors. It was the first fully Ferrari-developed 90° V8 engine, as the Ferrari 801 powerplant was Lancia-based. Designed by Carlo Chiti as a replacement for the Dino V6, but the engine was only used in two models and did not bear any successors. Two examples were produced and both were subsequently modified to become larger displacement 268 SP models.

=== Specifications ===
The new tipo 199 V8 had a total capacity of 2,458.70 cc (2.5 L; 150.0 cu in) from 77 by 66 mm (3.0 by 2.6 in) of bore and stroke. It was designed with a single overhead camshaft per cylinder bank configuration. The engine used four twin-choke Weber 40IF2C "Speciali" carburettors which mounted directly to the cylinder heads without manifolds. The barrels of this unusual carburetor design were angled at 45°, resulting in a reduced overall height of the engine. Following testing, these were thought to inhibit induction and were replaced with more conventional Weber 40DC carburetors on the 268 SP. The 248 SP engine produced 250 PS (184 kW; 247 hp) at 7400 rpm. A single spark plug per cylinder and a single ignition coil were mounted. The compression ratio was 9.8:1.

=== Racing ===
The first V8-engined, SP-series car was created in 1962. The s/n 0798, was demonstrated at the start of season press conference by Ferrari in February and before April, not being involved in any racing, the engine was modified with a longer stroke to a 2.6-litre specification.

The second Ferrari 248 SP, s/n 0806, was also created in 1962 but actually participated in racing. It was entered by N.A.R.T. in the 12 Hours of Sebring, the same year. Bob Fulp with Peter Ryan arrived at the finish line on a thirteenth position overall and a third in class. After only a single race, by May 1962 the car was converted into the 268 SP.

== 268 SP ==
Ferrari 268 SP
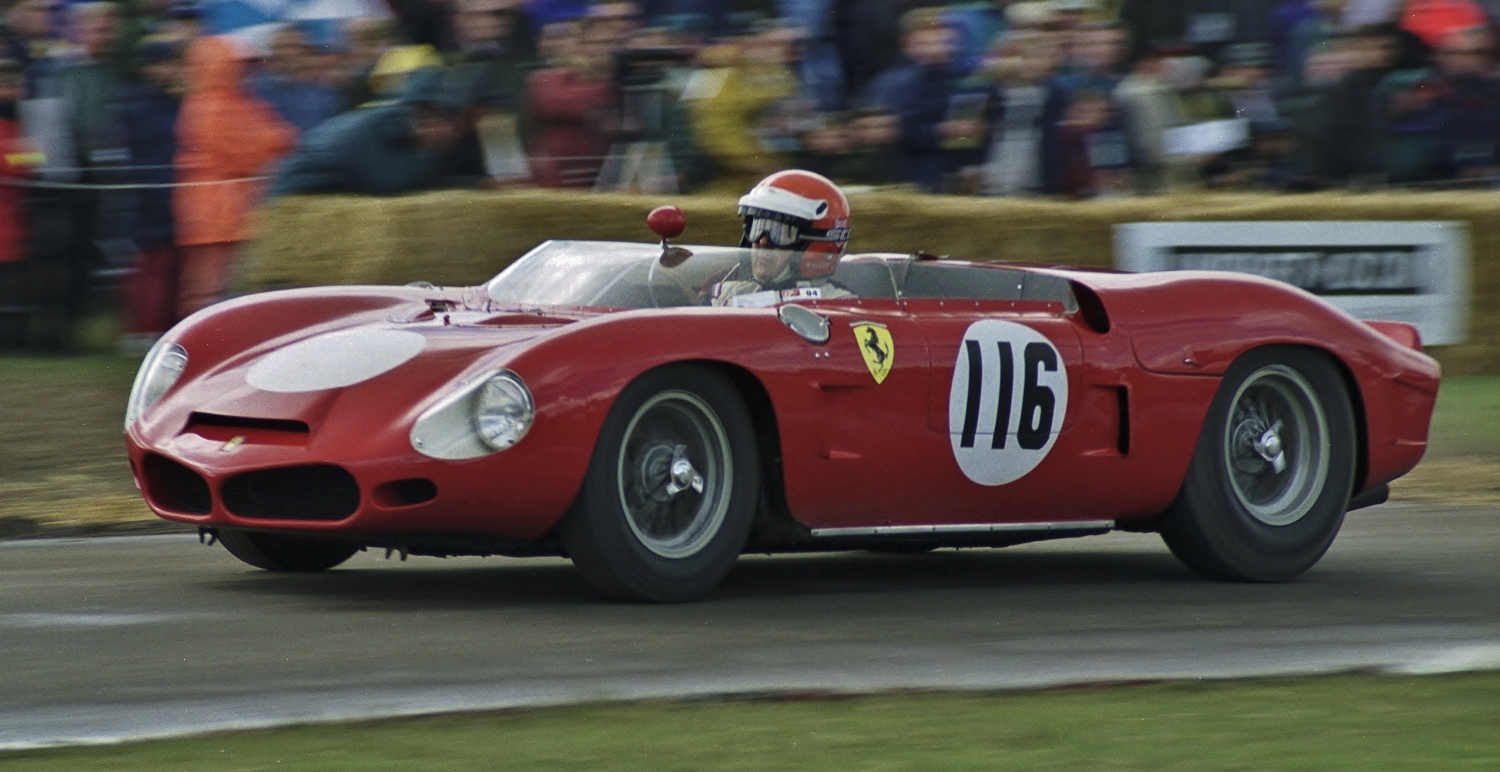

Overview
- Also called: Ferrari Dino 268 SP
- Production: 1962; 3 converted

Powertrain
- Engine: 2.6 L (2644.96 cc) Tipo 202 Chiti 90° V8
- Power output: 265 PS

Dimensions
- Length: 4,060mm
- Width: 1,480mm
- Height: 970mm
- Curb weight: 660 kg (1,455 lb) (dry)

The Ferrari 268 SP was a derivative version of the 248 SP also fitted with a V8 engine. It featured a bigger displacement with a stroke increased to 71 mm (2.8 in). The resulting capacity was 2.6 L, intended to be more competitive in the 3.0-litre Sport and Prototype classes. Only three examples existed, but all were converted from other models and only one (chassis 0798) remains in 268 SP configuration.

=== Specifications ===
The new tipo 202, updated V8 engine had 77 by 71 mm (3.0 by 2.8 in) of bore and stroke. The resulting capacity was now 2,644.96 cc (2.6 L; 161.4 cu in). The cylinder bore was unchanged from the 248 SP engine, with the increased capacity derived from a 2.5 mm longer crankshaft throw. Weber 40DC carburetors mounted on individual manifolds replaced the 40IF2C carburetors used on the 248 SP, in an attempt to improve air induction. SOHC configuration and single ignition remained the same as on the 248 SP. The new engine also had the same (9.8:1) or slightly lower (9.6:1) compression ratio as on the 2.4-litre V8. The power output rose to 265 PS (195 kW; 261 hp) at 7000 rpm, only slightly more than the 286 SP could produce.

=== Racing ===
==== Chassis 0798 ====
The first Ferrari 268 SP was converted from a 248SP chassis, s/n 0798. The engine was enlarged to 2.6-litres. The car's bodywork was further enhanced for improved aerodynamics, including a full-width windscreen. Scuderia Ferrari drivers Giancarlo Baghetti and Ludovico Scarfiotti drove 268 SP chassis 0798 in the 1962 24 Hours of Le Mans, but they retired after 18 hours due to transmission failure. Later the same year, 0798 was acquired by Luigi Chinetti's N.A.R.T., and entered in the Nassau Trophy. Driven by Lorenzo Bandini, 0798 finished eighth overall and third in class in the trophy race.

In 1963, 0798 was sold by N.A.R.T. to independent racing driver John 'Buck' Fulp, who entered it into a series of races in the United States. At the 1963 12 Hours of Sebring he and Harry Heuer placed 34th place overall and eighth in class, despite retiring early with a broken suspension. Fulp then competed at the 1963 Bahamas Speed Week, placing fifth overall and second in class at the "25 Lap Governor's Trophy", and eleventh overall and another second in class at the Nassau Trophy.

Subsequently, 0798 was bought back by Luigi Chinetti and sold again, racing in SCCA events through the 1960s until it was purchased by Ferrari collector Pierre Bardinon. 0798 is the only extant 268 SP and retains its original 2.6 L engine, although it underwent numerous bodywork modifications during its racing career that were reversed during a restoration by Bardinon.

==== Chassis 0802 ====
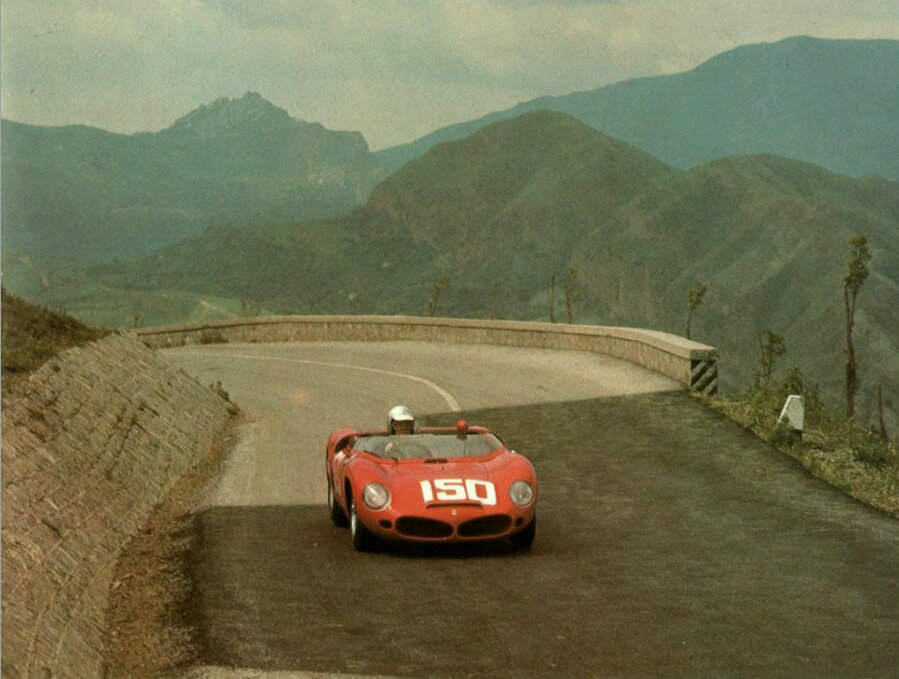
Chassis 0802 after being converted to 268 SP, attending practice of 1962 Targa Florio race, with Phil Hill driving

In 1962, the 286 SP chassis 0802 had a tipo 202 V8 engine installed, becoming the second 268 SP. During a practice at the 1962 Targa Florio with Phil Hill driving, 0802 suffered a major accident due to a stuck throttle. 0802 was unable to compete due to major damage. Phil Hill was sidelined and co-driver Olivier Gendebien was reassigned as a third driver for the 246 SP chassis 0796, the eventual winner of the race. Chassis 0802 was subsequently rebuilt and converted into a 196 SP.

==== Chassis 0806 ====
The last 268 SP, s/n 0806, was modified from a 248 SP in 1962. Scuderia Ferrari entered it at the 1000 km Nürburgring with the Rodriguez brothers driving. They did not finish the race as Pedro Rodriguez crashed on the 8th lap. Later in 1962, 0806 was repaired and converted into 196 SP specification.

== Technical Data ==
Technical data	246 SP	196 SP	286 SP	248 SP	268 SP
Engine:	65° 6-cylinder V-engine	60° 6-cylinder V-engine		90° 8-cylinder V-engine
displacement:	2417 cm³	1984 cm³	2863 cm³	2459 cm³	2645 cm³
Bore x stroke:	85 x 71 mm	77 x 71 mm	90.0 x 75.0 mm	77 x 66 mm	77 x 71 mm
Compression:	9.8:1		9.5:1	9.8:1	9.6:1
Max power at rpm:	270 PS at 8000 rpm	210 PS at 7500 rpm	260 PS at 6800 rpm	250 PS at 7400 rpm	265 PS at 7000 rpm
Valve control:	Double Overhead Camshafts per cylinder bank, 2 valves per cylinder	One overhead camshaft per cylinder bank, 2 valves per cylinder
Carburetor:	3 Weber 42 DCN			4 Weber 40 IF2C
Gearbox:	5-speed manual
suspension front & rear:	Double cross links, coil springs
Brakes:	Hydraulic disc brakes
Chassis & body:	Fackverks steel frame with aluminum body
Wheelbase:	2,320 mm (91.3 in)
Dry weight:	590 kg	600 kg		660 kg

== See also ==
- Ferrari P
- Ferrari 333 SP, a 1994 sports prototype
