= 1962 World Sportscar Championship =

Racing tournament

Seasons
- ← 1961 1963 →

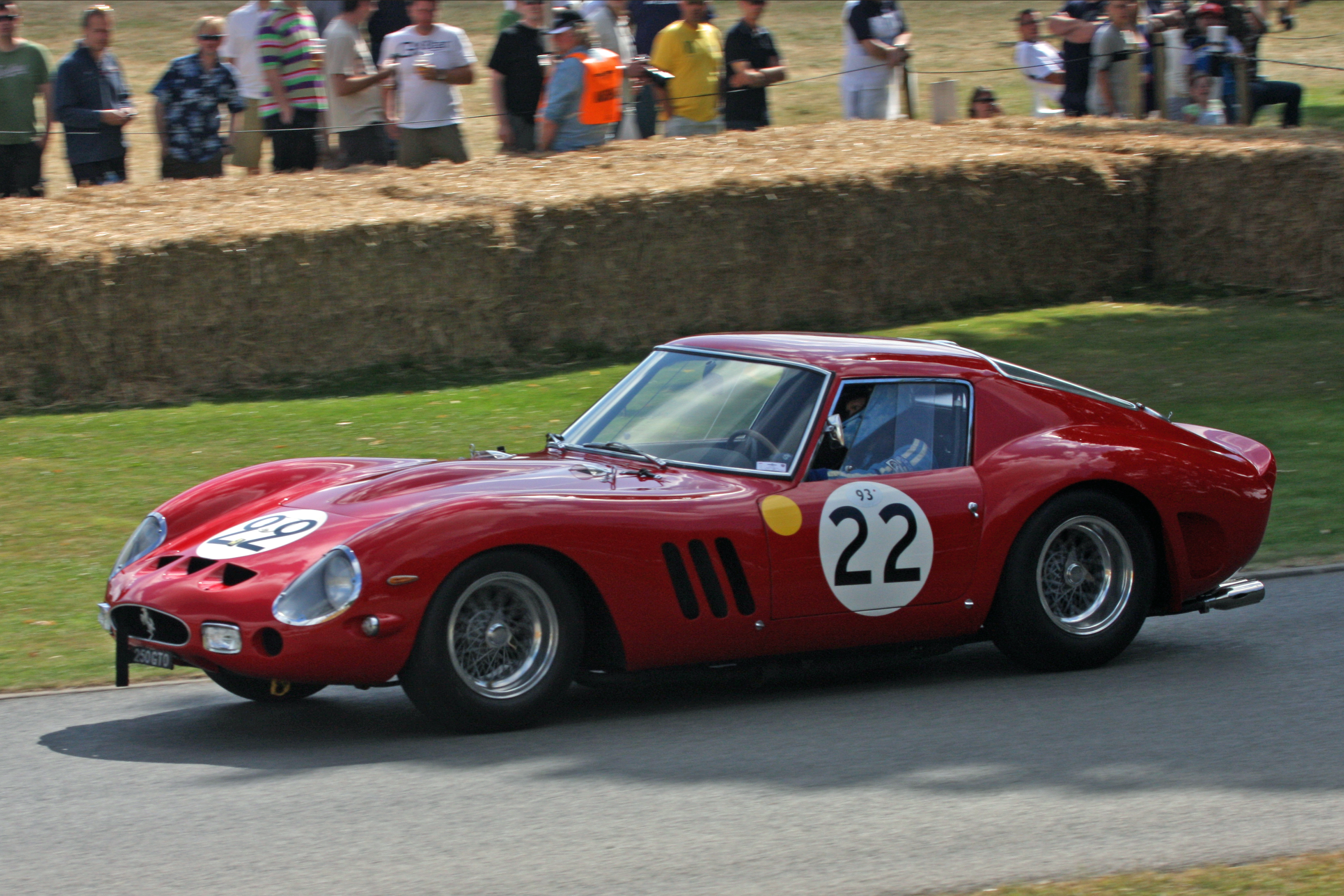
Ferrari won the over 2.0 litre GT class award with its 250 GT Berlinetta SWB and 250 GTO (pictured)

The 1962 World Sportscar Championship season was the 10th season of FIA World Sportscar Championship motor racing. It featured the 1962 International Championship for GT Manufacturers, which was contested in three engine capacity divisions, and the 1962 Coupe des Sports, which was contested in three engine capacity divisions. The season ran from 11 February 1962 to 21 September 1962 over 15 events. For this season the FIA shifted the focus to production based GT cars and the World Sportscar Championship title was discontinued. This was also the first year that each class had its own championship, instead of a single overall title.

== Schedule ==
Although composed of 15 races, each class did not compete in all events. Some events were for one class, while others were combined events.

Round	Race	Circuit or Location	Competitors	Date
1	(United States) 3 Hours of Daytona Continental	Daytona International Speedway	Both	11 February
2	(United States) Sebring 3 Hours	Sebring International Raceway	GT	23 March
3	(United States) 12 Hours of Sebring	Sebring International Raceway	Both	24 March
4	(Italy) Coppa Maifredi	Circuito del Garda	GT	1 May
5	(Italy) Targa Florio	Circuito delle Madonie	Both	6 May
6	(Germany) Berlin Grand Prix	AVUS	GT	13 May
7	(Germany) International ADAC 1000km Nürburgring	Nürburgring	Both	27 May
8	(France) 24 Hours of Le Mans	Circuit de la Sarthe	Both	23 June; 24 June
9	(France) Trophée d'Auvergne	Charade Circuit	Both	15 July
10	(Italy) Coppa Citta di Enna	Autodromo di Pergusa	GT	15 August
11	(United Kingdom) RAC Tourist Trophy	Goodwood Circuit	GT	18 August
12	(Germany) International ADAC 500 km Nürburgring	Nürburgring	GT	2 September
13	(United States) Double 400 km	Bridgehampton Race Circuit	GT2.0	15 September
14	(United States) Double 400 km	Bridgehampton Race Circuit	GT+2.0	16 September
15	(France) 1000 km de Paris	Autodrome de Montlhéry	GT	21 October

== Season results ==
Round	Circuit	Sportscar Winning Team	GT Winning Team	Results
Round	Circuit	Sportscar Winning Drivers	GT Winning Drivers	Results
1	Daytona	(United States) #96 Frank Arciero	(United States) #18 NART	Results
1	Daytona	(United States) Dan Gurney	(United Kingdom) Stirling Moss	Results
2	Sebring	Did Not Participate	(United States) #8 Briggs Cunningham	Results
2	Sebring	Did Not Participate	(New Zealand) Bruce McLaren	Results
3	Sebring	(Italy) #23 Scuderia SSS Venezia	(United States) #24 NART	Results
3	Sebring	(Sweden) Jo Bonnier (Belgium) Lucien Bianchi	(United States) Phil Hill (Belgium) Olivier Gendebien	Results
4	Circuito del Garda	Did Not Participate	(Italy) #56 No Team Name	Results
4	Circuito del Garda	Did Not Participate	(Italy) Ludovico Scarfiotti	Results
5	Palermo	(Italy) #152 SEFAC Ferrari	(Italy) #86 San Marco	Results
5	Palermo	(Belgium) Willy Mairesse (Belgium) Olivier Gendebien (Mexico) Ricardo Rodríguez	(Italy) Giorgio Scarlatti (Italy) Pietro Ferraro	Results
6	AVUS	Did Not Participate	(Switzerland) #40 No Team Name	Results
6	AVUS	Did Not Participate	(Switzerland) Robert Jenny	Results
7	Nürburgring	(Italy) #92 SEFAC Ferrari	(Germany) #51 Peter Nöcker	Results
7	Nürburgring	(United States) Phil Hill (Belgium) Olivier Gendebien	(Germany) Peter Nöcker (Germany) Wolfgang Seidel	Results
8	Le Mans	(Italy) #6 SpA Ferrari SEFAC	(Belgium) #19 Pierre Noblet	Results
8	Le Mans	(United States) Phil Hill (Belgium) Olivier Gendebien	(Belgium) Pierre Noblet (France) Jean Guichet	Results
9	Charade	(United Kingdom) #18 Essex Racing Team	(Italy) #3 Scuderia SSS Venezia	Results
9	Charade	(United Kingdom) Alan Rees	(Italy) Carlo Maria Abate	Results
10	Pergusa	Did Not Participate	(Italy) #58 Abarth	Results
10	Pergusa	Did Not Participate	(Italy) "Pam" (Italy) Giancarlo Scotti	Results
11	Goodwood	Did Not Participate	(United Kingdom) #15 UDT-Laystall	Results
11	Goodwood	Did Not Participate	(United Kingdom) Innes Ireland	Results
12	Nürburgring	Did Not Participate	(Italy) #86 Abarth	Results
12	Nürburgring	Did Not Participate	(Germany) Eberhard Mahle	Results
13	Bridgehampton (2.0)	Did Not Participate	(United States) #31 Chuck Cassel	Results
13	Bridgehampton (2.0)	Did Not Participate	(United States) Bob Holbert	Results
14	Bridgehampton (+2.0)	(United States) #3 NART	(United States) #17 Bob Grossman	Results
14	Bridgehampton (+2.0)	(Mexico) Pedro Rodríguez	(United States) Bob Grossman	Results
15	Montlhéry	Did Not Participate	(United States) #1 NART	Results
15	Montlhéry	Did Not Participate	(Mexico) Pedro Rodríguez (Mexico) Ricardo Rodríguez	Results

== Manufacturers' Championship ==
All championships scored points to the top six competitors in each class, in the order of 9-6-4-3-2-1. Constructors were only awarded points for their highest finishing car. Other finishers from the same manufacturer were merely skipped in the points count.

Only the best 5 results counted towards the championship. Points earned but not counted towards the championship total are listed in italics.

=== GT +2.0 ===
This championship was for all GT class cars over 2000 cc. GT +2.0 did not participate in Rounds 2, 4, 6, 10, 12, and 13.

Pos	Manufacturer	(United States) DAY	(United States) SEB	(Italy) TGA	(West Germany) NÜR	(France) LMS	(France) CHA	(United Kingdom) GWD	(United States) BHA	(France) MTY	Total
1	(Italy) Ferrari	9	9	9	9	9	9	9	9	9	45
2	(United Kingdom) Jaguar	2	3			4		3	4		16
3	(United States) Chevrolet	4	2						3		9
4	(Italy) Lancia			4							4
5	(United Kingdom) Aston Martin						1				1

=== GT 2.0 ===
This championship was for all GT class cars under 2000 cc but above 1000 cc. GT 2.0 did not participate in Rounds 2, 4, 6, 10, 12, and 14.

Pos	Manufacturer	(United States) DAY	(United States) SEB	(Italy) TGA	(West Germany) NÜR	(France) LMS	(France) CHA	(United Kingdom) GWD	(United States) BHA	(France) MTY	Total
1	(Germany) Porsche	6	9	9	9	9	9	3	9	9	45
2	(Italy) Alfa Romeo	9	4	6	2	4	4		4	2	27
3	(United Kingdom) Lotus	2			1	6		9		3	21
4	(United Kingdom) Morgan					1		6			7
5	(France) Abarth-Simca									4	4
6	(United Kingdom) Sunbeam		2					1			3
7	(United Kingdom) TVR							2			2
8	(United Kingdom) MG		1								1

=== GT 1.0 ===
This championship was for all GT class cars under 1000 cc. GT 1.0 only participated in Rounds 2, 4, 6, 10, 12, and 13.

Pos	Manufacturer	(United States) SEB	(Italy) GDA	(West Germany) AVU	(Italy) PER	(West Germany) NÜR	(United States) BHA	Total
1	(Italy) Fiat-Abarth	9	9	9	9	9	9	45
2	(South Africa) GSM			2		3		5
3	(United Kingdom) Austin-Healey	4						4

== Coupe des Sports ==
=== S 3.0 ===
This championship was for all Sportscar class cars under 3000 cc and over 2000 cc. Sportscars only scored points in Rounds 3, 5, and 7. The last two rounds were won by the Ferrari 246 SP.

Pos	Manufacturer	(United States) SEB	(Italy) TGA	(West Germany) NÜR	Total
1	(Italy) Ferrari	9	9	9	27
2=	(United Kingdom) Cooper	6			6
2=	(United Kingdom) Aston Martin			6	6
4	(Switzerland) Cegga-Ferrari			4	4

=== S 2.0 ===
This championship was for all Sportscar class cars under 2000 cc but above 1000 cc.

Porsche was the only manufacturer to finish a race in this class in the three scoring rounds, and were declared the champion.

=== S 1.0 ===
This championship was for all Sportscar class cars under 1000 cc. Sportscars only scored points in Rounds 3, 5, and 7.

Pos	Manufacturer	(United States) SEB	(Italy) TGA	(West Germany) NÜR	Total
1	(Italy) Fiat-Abarth	9		4	13
2	(United Kingdom) Lotus			9	9
3=	(Italy) O.S.C.A.	6			6
3=	(United Kingdom) Austin-Healey			6	6
5	(France) D.B.	4			4
