= Ferrari 250 Testa Rossa =

Racing sports car built by Ferrari from 1957 to 1961

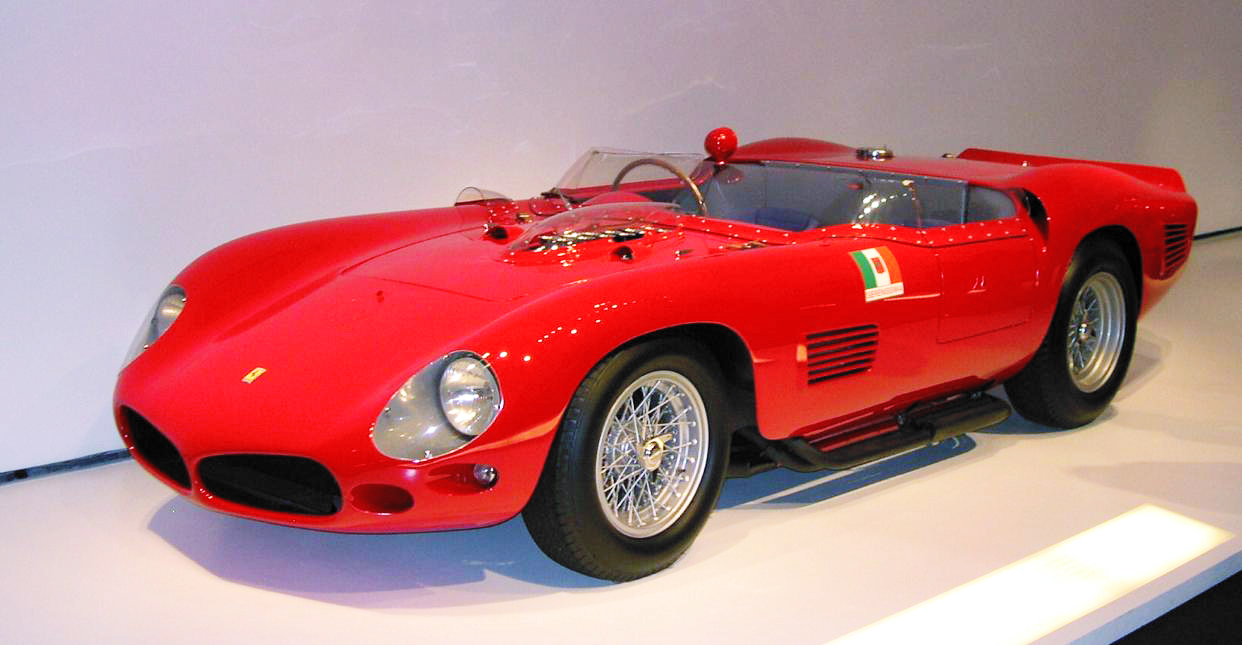
- 1961 250 TRI61 Spyder Fantuzzi, chassis 0792TR (Ralph Lauren collection)

Overview
- Manufacturer: Ferrari
- Also called: Ferrari 250 TR; Ferrari Testa Rossa
- Production: 1957–1961; 33 produced
- Assembly: Italy: Maranello
- Designer: Pinin Farina; Fantuzzi; Scaglietti; Carlo Chiti; Giotto Bizzarrini

Body and chassis
- Body style: Spyder
- Layout: Front mid-engine, rear-wheel-drive
- Related: Ferrari 250; Ferrari 500 TR; Ferrari 500 TRC

Powertrain
- Engine: 3.0 L (2953.21 cc) Tipo 128 Colombo V12
- Transmission: 4-speed manual 5-speed manual

Dimensions
- Wheelbase: 2,350 mm (92.5 in)
- Length: 3,959 mm (155.9 in)
- Width: 1,523 mm (60.0 in)
- Kerb weight: 800 kg (dry)

Chronology
- Predecessor: Ferrari 500 TR
- Successor: Ferrari 250 P

The Ferrari 250 Testa Rossa, or 250 TR, is a sports racing car built by Ferrari from 1957 to 1961. It was introduced at the end of the 1957 racing season in response to rule changes that enforced a maximum engine displacement of 3 litres for the 24 Hours of Le Mans and World Sports Car Championship races. The 250 TR was closely related to earlier Ferrari sports cars, sharing many key components with other 250 models and the 500 TR.

The 250 TR achieved many racing successes, with variations winning 10 World Sports Car Championship races including the 24 Hours of Le Mans in 1958, 1960, and 1961, the 12 Hours of Sebring in 1958, 1959 and 1961, the Targa Florio in 1958, the 1000 Km Buenos Aires in 1958 and 1960 and the Pescara 4 Hours in 1961. These results led to World Sports Car Championship constructor's titles for Ferrari in 1958, 1960 and 1961.

== Design and development ==
The 250 Testa Rossa was initially developed to compete in the 1957 World Sportscar Championship racing season, in response to rule changes planned for the upcoming 1958 season that would enforce a maximum engine displacement of 3 litres. The objective was to improve on the existing 4-cylinder 2.0L 500 TR/500 TRC Testa Rossa by integrating the more powerful Colombo-designed 3.0L V12 as used in 250 GT series. Along with the new engine, Ferrari improved the existing Testa Rossa chassis and bodywork. As with other Ferrari racing cars, Enzo Ferrari demanded absolute reliability from all components, resulting in a somewhat conservative design approach that aimed for endurance racing success through durability rather than overall speed. Carlo Chiti was the chief designer during 250 TR development and his continual experimentation counterbalanced Mr. Ferrari's conservatism and led to the many revisions that kept the car competitive through 1962. Other Ferrari engineers had major contributions to the 250 TR, notably Giotto Bizzarrini, who helped with aerodynamic improvements for the 1961 season, and Andrea Fraschetti, who helped develop the first 250 TR prototype before his 1957 death during a test drive.

The 250 TR was raced and continually developed by Scuderia Ferrari from 1957 through 1962. In total, 33 250 TRs of all types were built between 1957 and 1962. Included in this total are 19 "customer versions" of the 250 TR sold to independent racing teams, replacing the 500 TRC for this market. All customer cars had left hand drive Scaglietti "pontoon fender" bodies and live rear axles. They did not benefit from the continual improvements to Scuderia Ferrari cars, although many independent teams modified their 250 TRs or purchased ex-Scuderia Ferrari cars in order to stay competitive.

=== Engine and drivetrain ===
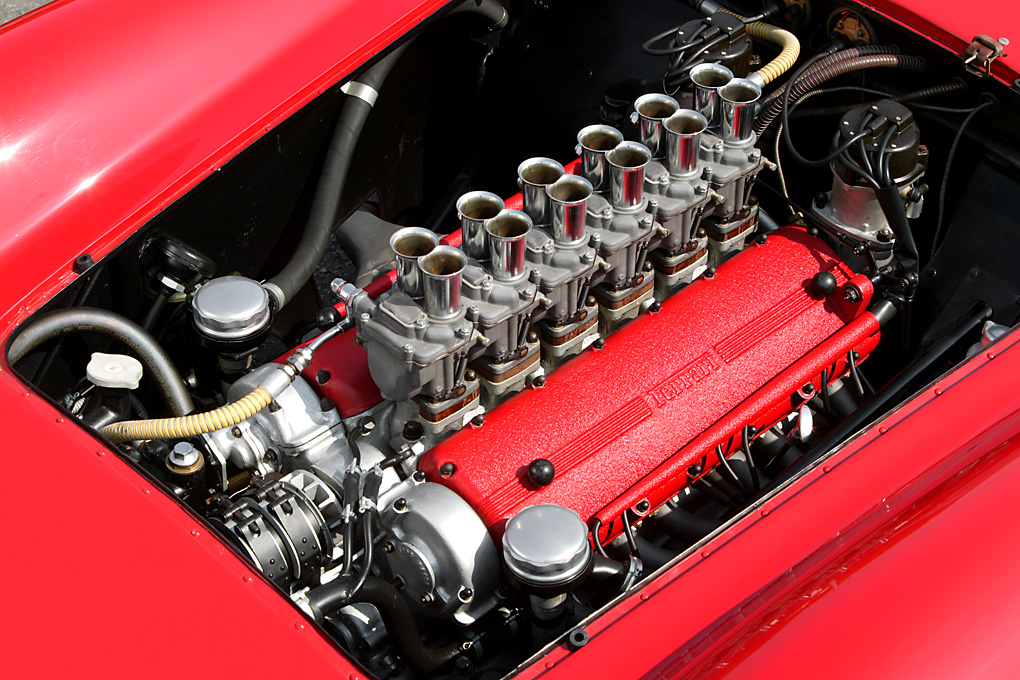
250 Testa Rossa Tipo 128 V-12 Engine

The 250 Testa Rossa engine was based on Colombo-designed 3.0L V12 used in 250 GT road and racing cars. Carlo Chiti and other Ferrari engineers made several modifications to increase the performance of this already proven engine. The starting point was a 1953-style cylinder block with an overall capacity of 2953 cc, a 73 mm bore and 58.8 mm stroke. Six two-barrel Weber 38 DCN carburetors fed the engine, increased from the 3 carburetors typical for 250 GT engines. The cylinder heads used single overhead cams, 2 valves per cylinder and helical double-coil valve springs (a first for Ferrari).

The helical valve springs were much smaller than previously used torsion springs, allowing the cylinder heads to be strengthened and secured with 24 studs rather than 18 in previous 250 engines. This increased the overall reliability of the engine by improving head gasket sealing. One spark plug was used per cylinder and the position was changed from earlier 250 designs, now located outside the engine vee between exhaust ports. This allowed for a better spark position and more efficient combustion. Piston connecting rods were now machined from steel billet, rather than forged, which resulted in more stress-resistance at higher RPM. The cam covers were painted bright red, the source of the name "Testa Rossa" (literally, "Red Head"). This tradition and name originated with the 500 TR.

The resulting engine was designated Tipo 128 and generated 300 hp (220 kW) at 7000 rpm. The power/displacement ratio of 100 hp/litre was a particular point of pride for Ferrari, as it demonstrated how Ferrari's engineering prowess could create a competitive engine even under rules restricting displacement. The engineering team improved a well understood, proven design by incorporating new technology and strengthening known weak points. They created an exceptionally durable engine, a massive benefit in endurance racing. Other Ferrari racing cars (250 GTO, 250 P) achieved racing success with the same basic engine well into the 1960s, years after the 250 TR chassis was obsolete.

1957–1958 250 TRs used a 4-speed transmission, followed by a 5-speed transmission in 1959. Customer cars were equipped with a 250 GT-style transmission positioned directly behind the engine, while Scuderia Ferrari team cars sometimes used rear-mounted transaxles for better weight distribution.

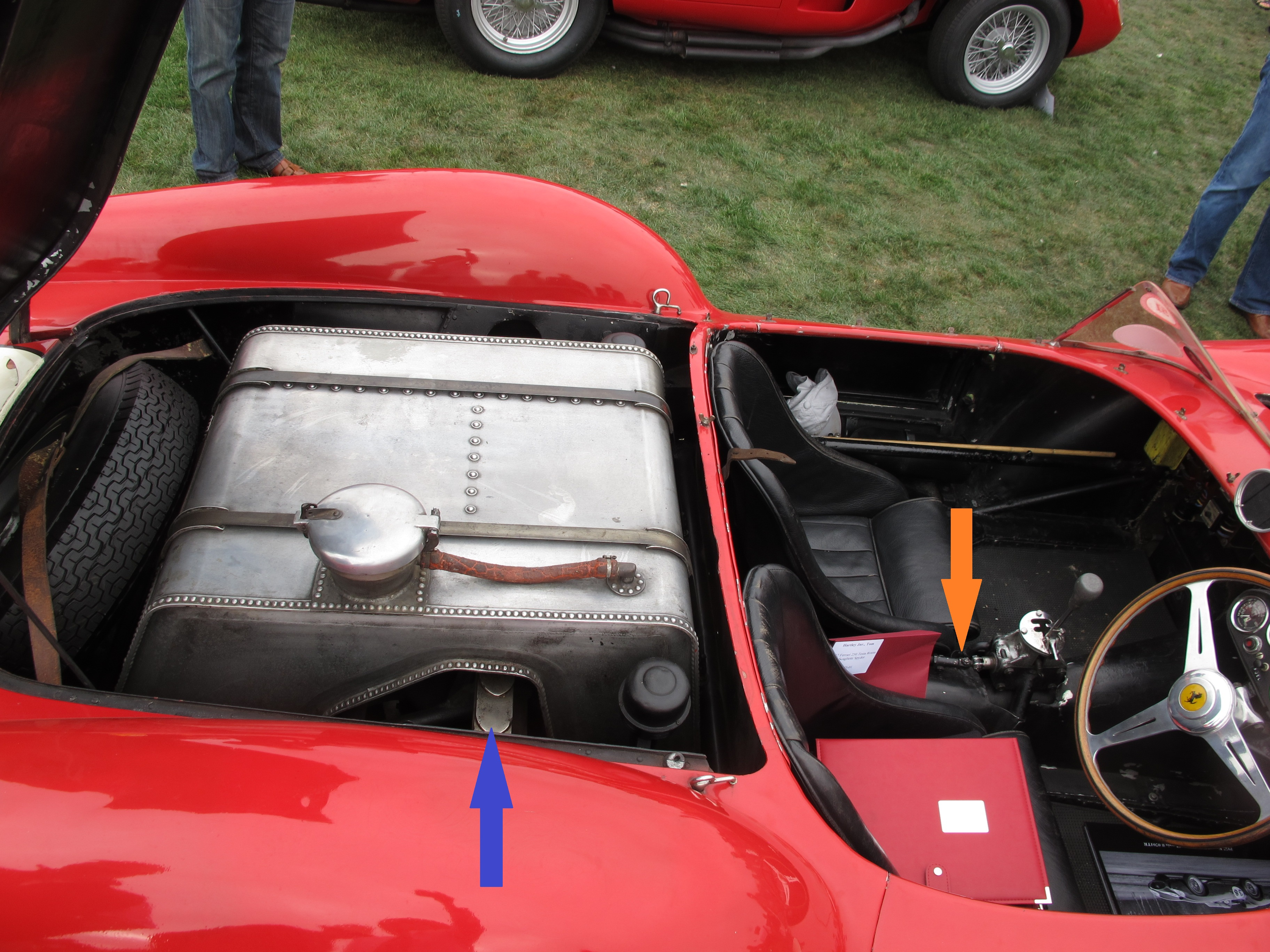
1957 - 1958 factory team car. Orange arrow: shifter shaft to transaxle. Blue arrow: Leaf spring for de Dion suspension.

=== Chassis, brakes and suspension ===
The 250 Testa Rossa used a tubular steel spaceframe chassis, similar to that used in the 500 TR. Compared to the 500 TR, the wheelbase was extended by 10 cm to 2.35 meters. The chassis gained a reputation for durability, as it was designed according to Enzo Ferrari's desire for absolute reliability even at the expense of excess weight.

All 250 TRs used independent front suspension with coil springs. All customer cars had live rear axles. Pre-1960 factory team cars used either live or de Dion rear axles while the 1960 250 TRI60 and 1961 250 TRI61 used independent rear suspension.

1957 and 1958 250 TRs were equipped with drum brakes on all four wheels. Enzo Ferrari insisted on the use of drum brakes in the early 250 TRs as he believed they were more reliable and predictable in how they faded compared to more powerful but relatively new disc brakes. Drum brakes were unpopular with drivers as they required tremendous physical exertion to operate, due to lack of servo assist and the extremely hard, long-lasting pads used for endurance races. Despite the extensive air cooling used in the 1958 "pontoon fender"-bodied cars, drum brakes were still subject to heat-induced fade. They were finally replaced with Dunlop disc brakes in all Scuderia Ferrari cars for the 1959 race season.

=== Bodywork and interior ===
All 250 TRs had 2-seater spider bodies, as did the earlier 4-cylinder Testa Rossas. At the time, this was considered the lightest and most aerodynamic configuration for a racing sports car.

The first 250 Testa Rossa prototype (chassis number 0666TR) debuted at the 1957 Nürburgring 1000km. This hastily prepared prototype was based on a 290 MM chassis and had conventional bodywork by Scaglietti very similar to that of the 4-cylinder 500 TR, except for a large hood bulge.

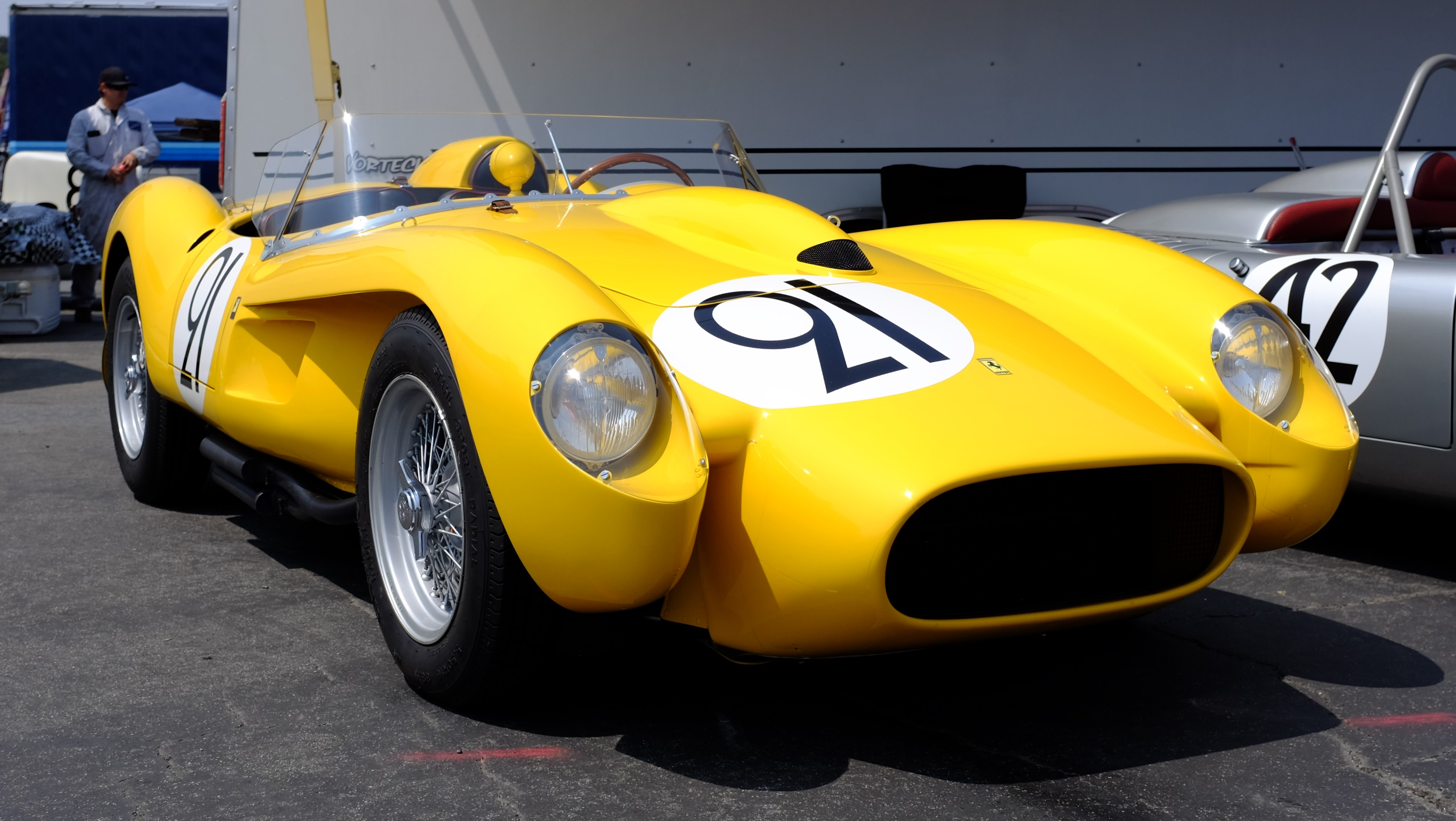
1958 250 TR with "pontoon fender" Scaglietti body. The channels for front brake cooling are clearly visible

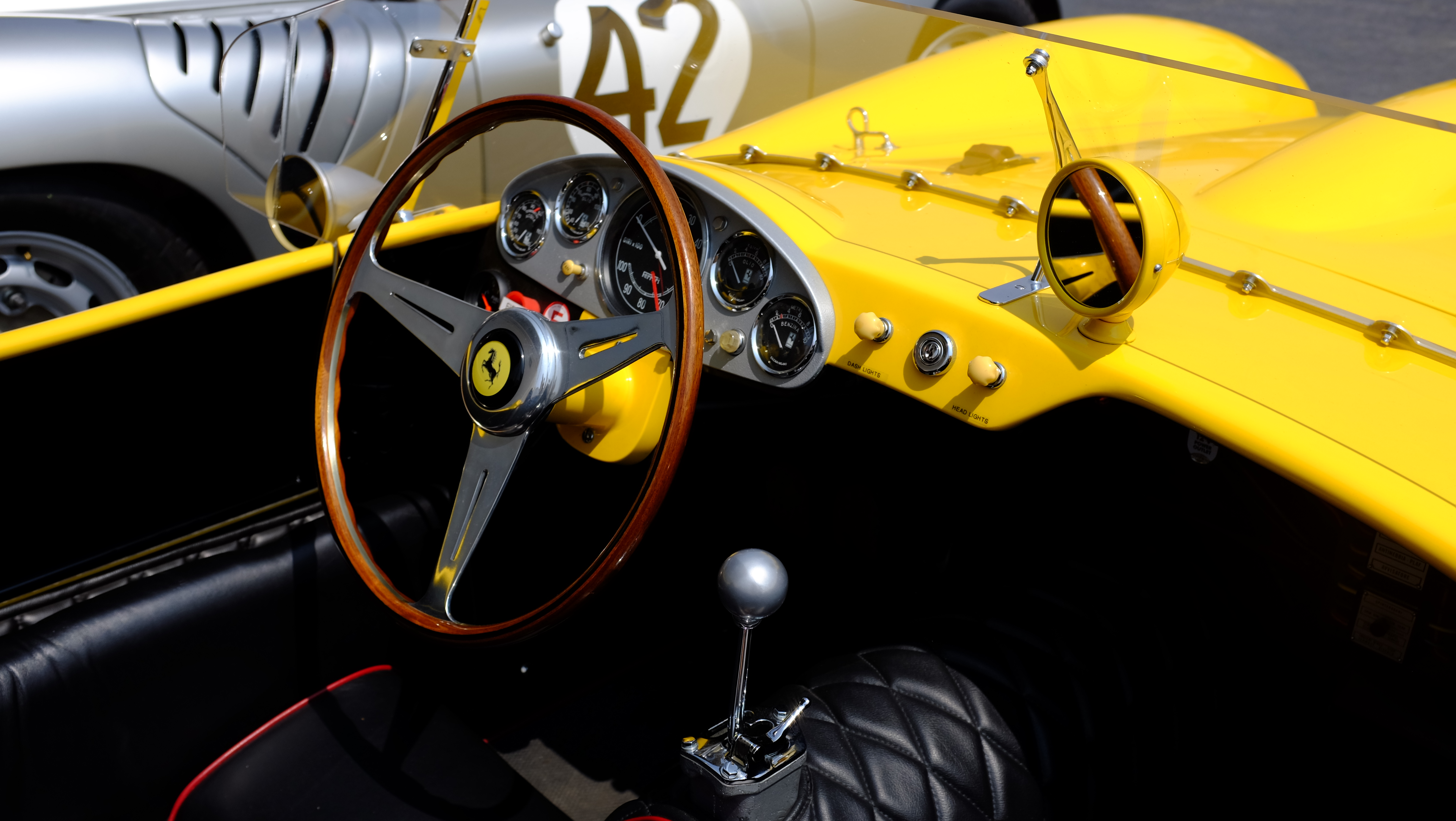
Interior of 1958 250 TR.

For the 1958 250 TR, new bodywork was developed in collaboration between Scaglietti and Chiti with several innovations on the previous 4-cylinder Testa Rossa body. Instead of the conventional fully enclosed front end, the new body had a distinctive cut-away nose reminiscent of a Formula 1 car. The protuberant central air intake was now flanked by deep channels and the headlights were set into nacelle- or pontoon-like fenders that enveloped each front wheel. The purpose of this design was to funnel cooling air inwards towards the brake drums, mitigating the persistent problem of heat-related fade. The lower body was recessed inwards behind the front wheels in order to vent heat from the brakes and exhaust. The front hood was topped with a large bulge and air intake (forward facing on some cars, reverse facing on others) to provide clearance for the vertically oriented carburetors. The rear bodywork was more conventional, including a tapered fairing behind the driver's head and two small brake lights set into vertical fins.

The distinctive cutaway-nose bodywork of the 1958 cars became the most iconic 250 TR style and was used on all cars sold new to private customers. This resulted in the colloquial name for early Scaglietti-bodied 250 TRs: "pontoon fender." Despite their radical appearance, racing and test runs soon showed that this design generated a significant amount of aerodynamic drag and high speed instability. This was especially noticeable when competing on high speed courses such as the Circuit de la Sarthe against more aerodynamic cars such as the Maserati Tipo 61 and Jaguar D-Type. As a result, the Scaglietti bodywork was soon revised and a wide variety of alternative styles were created from 1958 through 1961. Even during 1958, some Scuderia Ferrari cars were equipped with more conventional bodies in the style of the 1957 prototype.

The 250 TR's open interior was simple and utilitarian, lacking the luxury trimmings found in Ferrari GT cars. The instrumentation and controls were completely focused around the driver. Like other 1950s and 1960s Ferrari sports cars, 250 TRs were equipped with an open gated shifter and a Nardi wooden steering wheel.

=== Variants and further development ===
The 250 TR was subject to continual iteration and refinement from 1957 to 1961, resulting in numerous differences between individual cars that may or may not coincide with different chassis production dates. As was common with Ferrari racing cars of the 1950s and 1960s, 250 TRs were frequently modified and updated by the Ferrari factory and/or private owners. Bodywork was often changed to improve performance or to repair crash damage. Ferrari historians track these changes with a numbering suffix based on year of production (such as 250 TR61 for a 1961-style car) as well as descriptors such as "Spider Fantuzzi" to denote cars with bodies fabricated by Fantuzzi. Despite this historiographical systematization, the low-production, hand-built nature of these cars and their use and modification in period mean that differences are most thoroughly explained in the context of an individual chassis' history.

==== 1959: TR59 ====
For the 1959 season, the 250 TR body design was lightly revised by Pinin Farina, with fabrication of the bodies handled by Fantuzzi. The cutaway nose with pontoon fenders was gone, replaced by a more aerodynamic design that still incorporated many ventilation grilles and air inlets.

The 1959 250 TR was the first Ferrari sports car to use disc brakes (manufactured by Dunlop). Disc brakes are much less susceptible to heat build-up and fade than drum brakes, so the extra air cooling provided by the 1958 Scaglietti body was no longer necessary.

A 5-speed transmission mounted directly behind the engine was also introduced in 1959.

==== 1960: TR60 and TRI60 ====
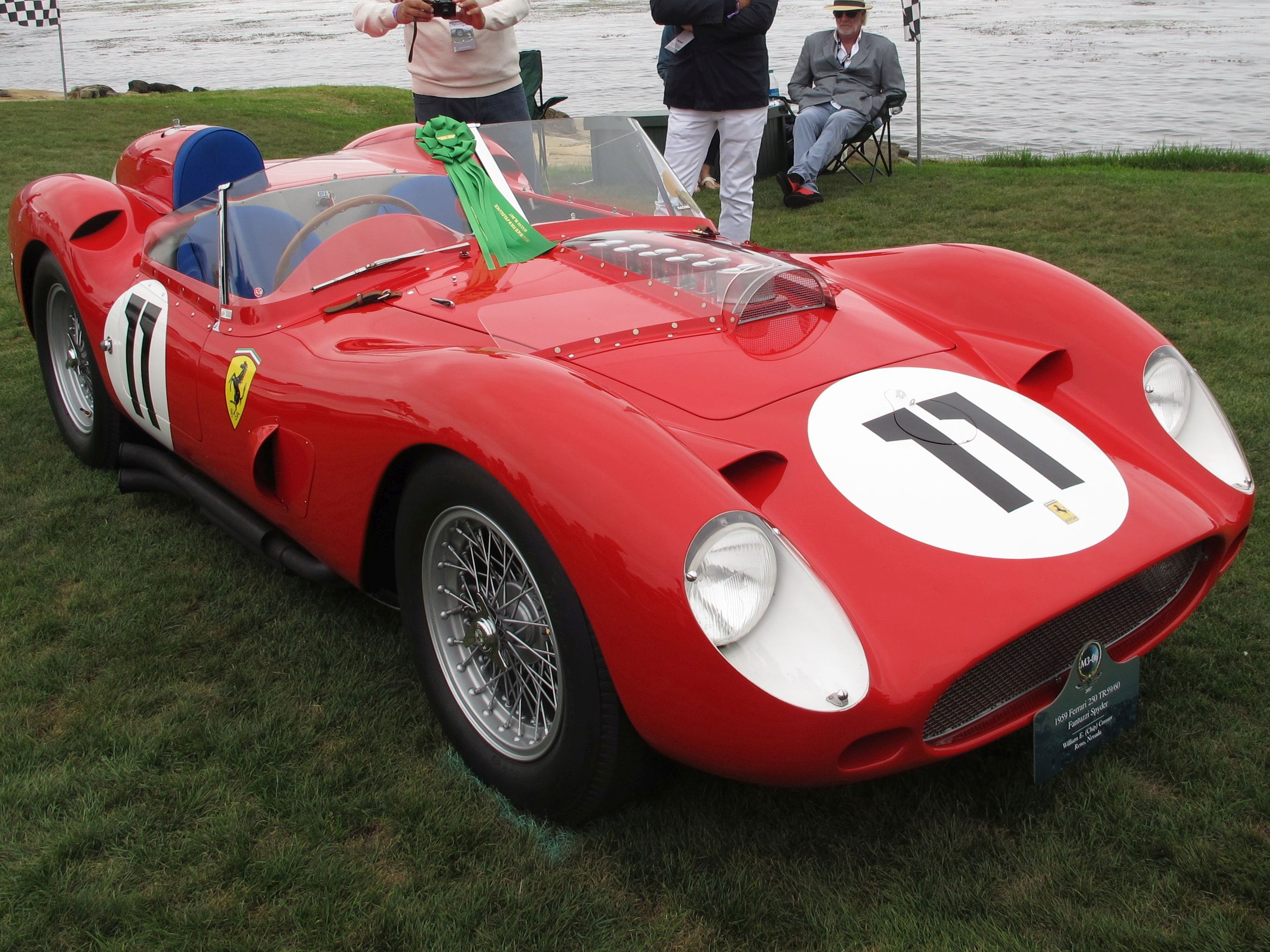
1959 250 TR59/60 Spider Fantuzzi, showing the tall windshield used on 1960 cars

Dry sump lubrication systems became standard equipment for all 250 TRs in 1960. This allowed the engine to sit lower in the chassis, lowering the car's center of mass for improved handling and enabling a lower, more aerodynamic front profile.

Rear independent suspension was introduced to the 250 TR in 1960. The car equipped with independent suspension was designated the 250 TRI60 (chassis 0780TR) and throughout the season raced alongside the 250 TR60 equipped with a conventional de Dion rear axle.

The body of the 250 TR again changed for the 1960 season, primarily due to new regulations requiring a windshield with a vertical height of 25 cm. The new, larger windshield was immediately disliked by drivers, as it was difficult to see over, the plexiglass material could not be effectively cleared by windshield wipers, and the much larger surface area increased drag. The excess drag resulted in a top speed of 161 mph (259 km/h) down the Mulsanne Straight at Le Mans. In comparison, during the same race Masten Gregory's Maserati Tipo 61 reached approximately 175 mph (282 km/h).

1959 cars that were updated to 1960 specification (minus independent rear suspension) are often designated as 250 TR59/60.

==== 1961: TRI61 ====
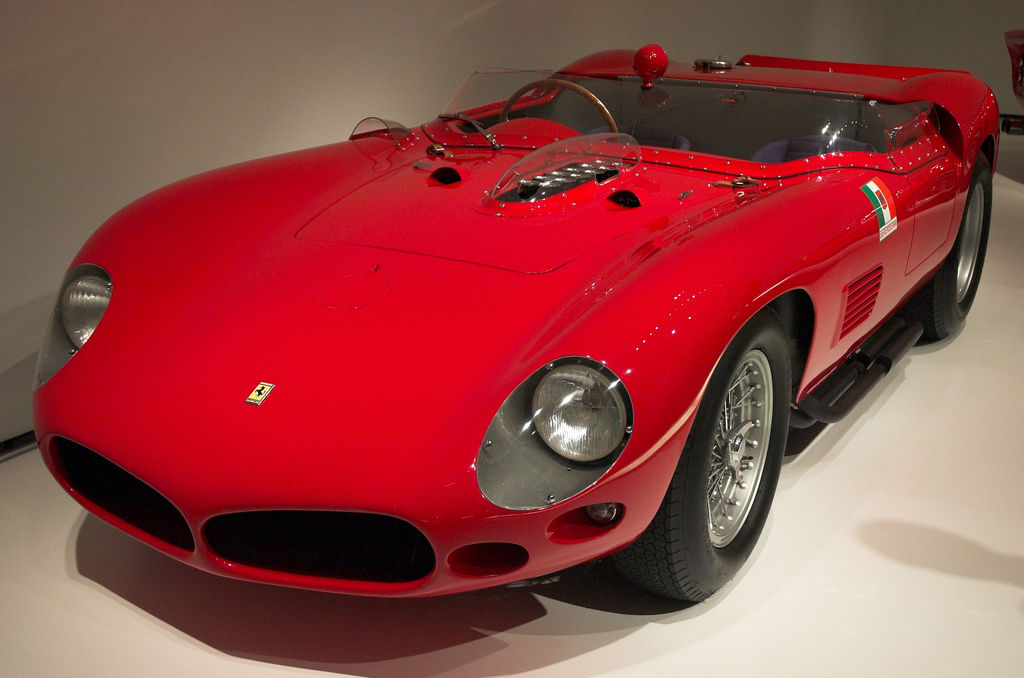
1961 250 TRI61 Spider Fantuzzi

All 1961 250 Testa Rossas were designated 250 TRI61 as independent rear suspension was now standard.

Due to high drag and visibility problems with the TR60 body style, Ferrari engineers including Giotto Bizzarrini and Carlo Chiti were tasked with completely re-designing the 250 TR bodywork for the 1961 racing season. As a result, the new Fantuzzi-built TRI61 body incorporated a number of dramatic changes, informed by new aerodynamic theories and wind-tunnel testing. The windshield now had a more gradual slope and wrapped around both sides of the cockpit to meet the rear bodywork. Instead of the rounded tail with fairing for the driver's head, the TRI61 had a very high rear body that met the trailing edge of the side windows and tapered to a truncated, slightly concave Kamm tail. This bodystyle was called an "open coupe" and was very similar to bodies used on mid-engined Ferrari sports racers such as the 1961 246 SP.

The front air inlet was now split into two openings, introducing the distinctive "sharknose" or "nostril" style that was also used on other Ferrari sports racing cars such as the 246 SP and the 156 Formula 1 car. This front end styling had first appeared on a trio of Maserati 250Fs that Fantuzzi re-bodied in 1958 for racer Ross Jensen and team owner Temple Buell (son of the architect with the same name). Fantuzzi's suggestion that the twin intakes would improve air penetration was confirmed by Chiti's wind tunnel testing, leading to the adoption of this style throughout Ferrari's 1961 racing cars.

During testing of the 250 TRI61, a full-width angled "deflector" panel was installed along the top edge of the rear bodywork. This was initially installed to prevent exhaust fumes from entering the cockpit under deceleration. After testing the prototype with the deflector, driver Richie Ginther commented that high-speed stability seemed to improve with only a slight reduction in top speed, leading to the inclusion of this feature on all 1961 bodies. The Ferrari engineers had in effect created a rear spoiler, well before engineers understood the aerodynamic theory behind them and integrated them into many car designs.

==== 1962: 330 TRI/LM ====
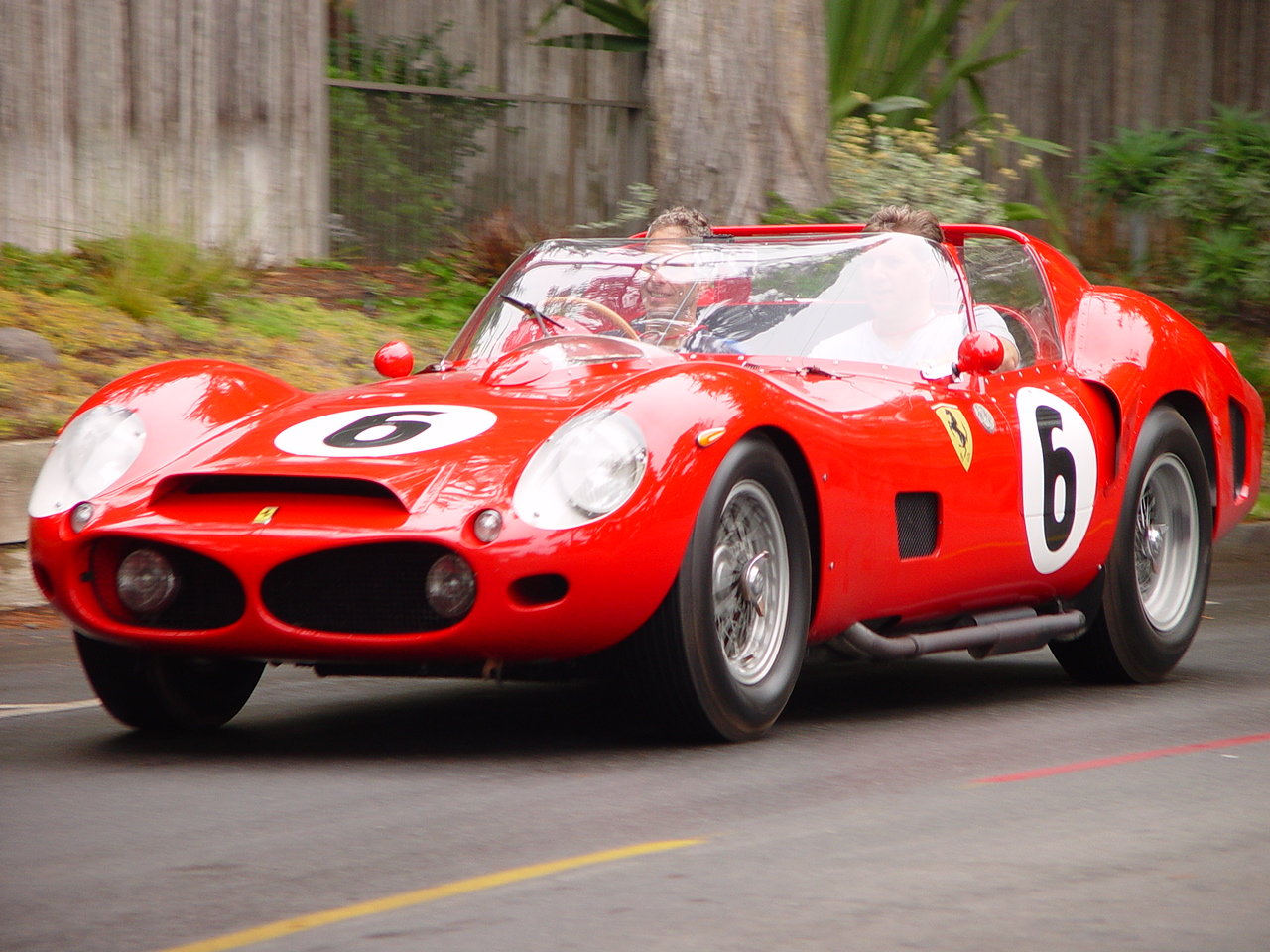
1962 Ferrari 330 TRI/LM

For the 1962 season, Ferrari developed the final iteration of the front-engined Testa Rossa, the 330 TRI/LM (LM standing for Le Mans). The biggest change from the 250 TR was a Tipo 163 4.0 litre Colombo V12 developed from the engine of the 400 Superamerica, further improved with Testa Rossa cylinder heads and other modifications seen on 250 TR engines. This engine produced 390 hp (290 kW) at 7500 rpm, significantly more power than the 250-series 3.0L unit. This engine design would be used again in the 1964 330 P.

The single 330 TRI/LM (chassis number 0808) was built from a damaged 250 TRI60 (chassis 0780TR). The original chassis was lengthened and a TRI61-style spider body by Fantuzzi was fitted. At the 1962 24 Hours of Le Mans, this car was driven by Olivier Gendebien and Phil Hill and became the last front-engine car to win an overall victory at Le Mans.

== Racing history ==
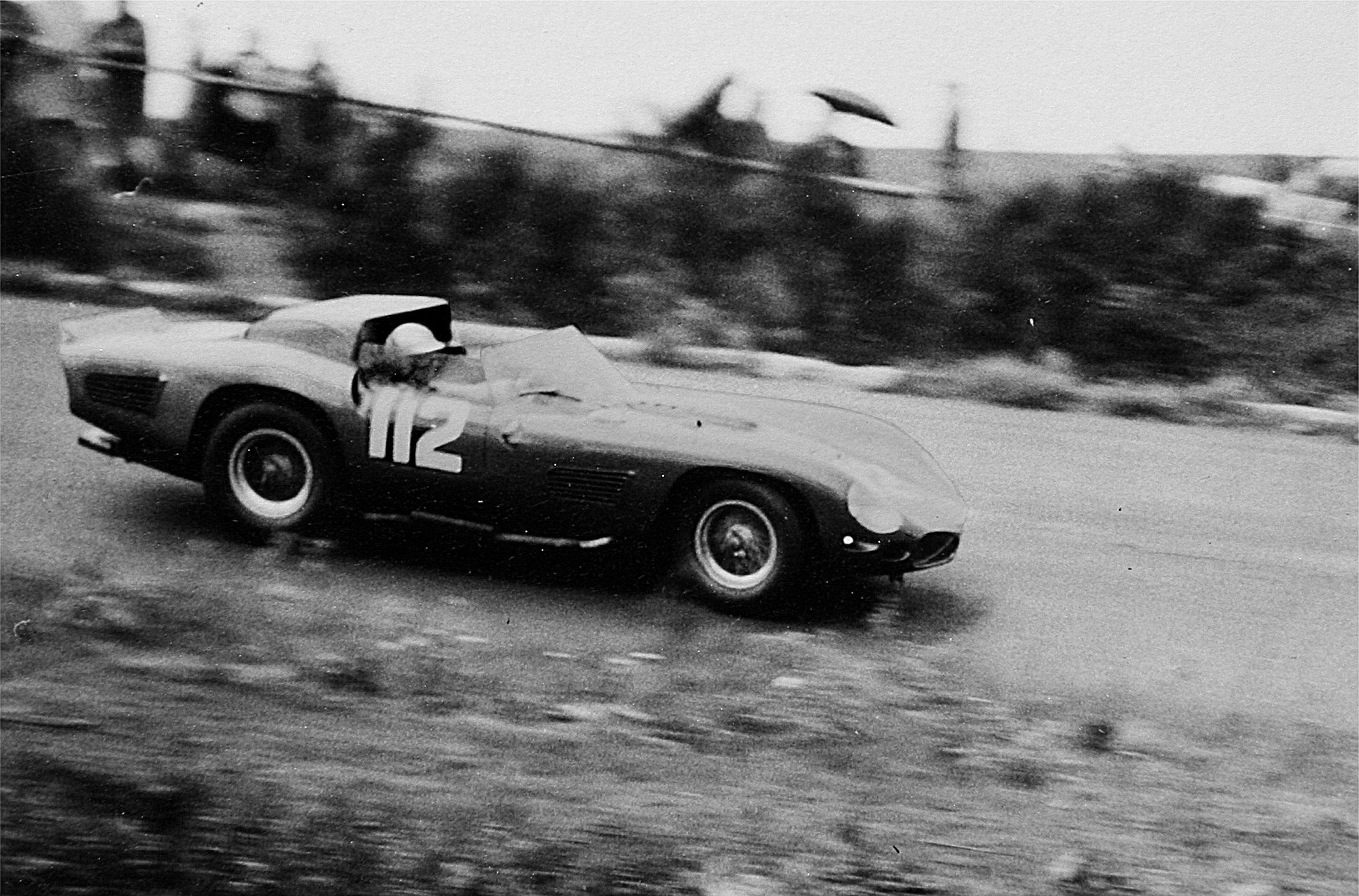
The 250 TRI61 of Abate/Maglioli, driving for Scuderia Serenissima at the 1963 Nürburgring 1000km.

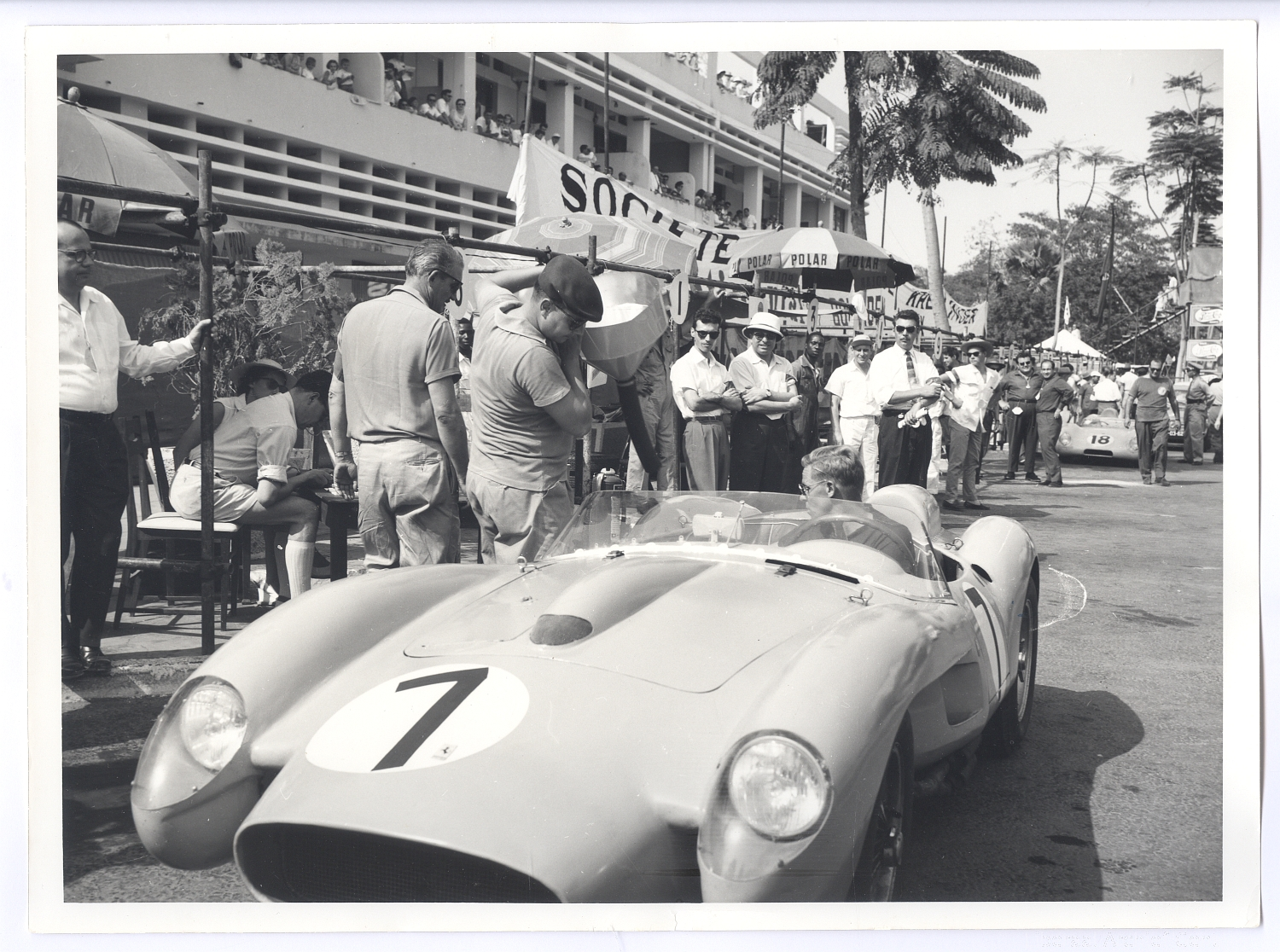
250 TR (chassis 0736) at the 1958 GP Léopoldville, with Paul Frère driving

The 250 Testa Rossa was raced successfully throughout the late 1950s and early 1960s. Independent teams raced the 250 TR alongside Scuderia Ferrari cars from 1958 on, although the most developed versions of the car were restricted to factory-sanctioned teams only.

250 TRs were extremely competitive during this time, winning 10 World Sportscar Championship races including the 1958, 1960, and 1961 24 Hours of Le Mans, the 1958, 1959 and 1961 12 Hours of Sebring, the 1958 Targa Florio, the 1958 and 1960 1000 km Buenos Aires and the 1961 4 hours of Pescara. Notable drivers included Phil Hill, Olivier Gendebien, Luigi Musso, Peter Collins, Dan Gurney, Wolfgang von Trips and Mike Hawthorn, among them.

The excellent results of 250 TRs and Scuderia Ferrari's skilled drivers earned Ferrari the 1958, 1960 and 1961 Constructor's World Sportscar Championship titles.

The similar Aston Martin DBR1 and the small 1.5 litre rear mid engine Porsche 718 were the 250 TR's closest competitors during this time. Stirling Moss drove a DBR1 to win first place against strong Ferrari opposition at the 1958 1000km Nürburgring, and DBR1s would go on to win over 250 TRs at the 1959 Le Mans, Nürburgring, and Tourist Trophy races, depriving Ferrari of the Constructor's World Championship in 1959. Porsche won the Targa Florio in 1956, 1959, 1960 and the 1960 12 Hours of Sebring, with Porsche leading the five-race 1960 World Sportscar Championship standings until getting overpowered in Le Mans. Tied in the end with 22 points each from two wins and a second, the tie breaker was in favor of Ferrari with two 3rd places over the single 3rd of Porsche. In the 1961 season, still run with five events, also Ferrari adopted the mid-engine concept, starting with V6 engine cars, and Porsche remained winless.

New rules were introduced for the 1962 World Sportscar Championship season that expanded to no less than 15 races, some of them counting towards GT car categories with up to 750cc, 850, 1000, 1300, 1600, 2000, 2500, 3000, and 3000+. Sports cars were divided into 1000cc, 2000 and 3000cc classes, and had only three races, Sebring, Targa, and Nürburgring, but not '62 Le Mans were the organizers allowed "experimental" sportscars with up to 4000cc. For that race, Ferrari built the one-off Ferrari 330 TRI/LM, and it did win over Maseratis and Astons with similar large engines. It was the last Le Mans win for a front engine car, as the '63 Le Mans was won by the first mid-engine V12 Ferrari, the Ferrari 250 P.

== Influence ==
The Tipo 128 Colombo-designed 3.0L V12 developed for the 250 Testa Rossa would continue to be used in Ferrari sports racing cars through the early 1960s. The 250 GTO, 250 P and 250 LM achieved racing success with this engine.

Experimentation on 250 TR body styles from 1957 through 1962 provided Ferrari engineers with valuable experience in developing both low-drag and stability-promoting aerodynamic bodywork. The 250 GTO, SP sports racers, and 250/275/330 P were the immediate beneficiaries of this knowledge.

Ferrari named the 1984-1991 Testarossa road car as a homage to the 500 TR and 250 TR. In contrast to the front-engine V12-powered 250 TR, the Testarossa is a mid-engine design using a flat-12 engine and was designed as a road-going sports car, rather than a racer.

== Collectibility ==
The 250 Testa Rossa is one of the most valuable vintage Ferraris (and therefore one of the most valuable cars of any type), due to their low production (33 total including all 250 TR variants), racing success and historical influence. The 250 GTO is generally considered to have a greater monetary value, although true market values are difficult to determine due to how seldom either model is sold at auction. 250 TRs are often seen at prestigious auto shows such as the Pebble Beach Concours d'Elegance and the Goodwood Festival of Speed.

A 1957 250 TR (chassis 0714TR) sold for €9,020,000 at RM Sotheby's 2009 Maranello auction. The 1957 250 TR prototype (chassis 0666TR) sold for $16.39 million at the 2011 Gooding & Co Pebble Beach auction. 250 TR chassis 0704 reportedly sold privately in 2014 for $39.8 million.

Fashion designer Ralph Lauren's extensive auto collection contains two 250 TRs, a 1958 Scaglietti-bodied car (chassis 0734TR) and a 1961 250 TR/61 Spider Fantuzzi (chassis 0792TR).

The value, performance and historical significance ascribed to the 250 TR have motivated many individuals and companies to create reproduction automobiles. Sold as a "replica", "recreation" or "reproduction", these can vary widely in historical accuracy and sophistication, sometimes using Ferrari engines and chassis or simply attempting to replicate the body style of the original with unrelated mechanical underpinnings. Some of these reproductions have been unscrupulously represented as original, factory-built 250 TRs.

As 250 TR values rose, some extremely damaged or destroyed 250 TRs were reconstructed using varying amounts of newly fabricated or non-original components. In at least one instance, this has resulted in a case of disputed identity, whereby multiple reconstructed or reproduced cars lay claim to a particular factory chassis number.
