= Ricardo Rodríguez (racing driver) =

Mexican racing driver (1942–1962)

- Rodriguez at the Kiwanis Grand Prix, Riverside, California, July 1959
- Born: 14 February 1942; Mexico City, Mexico
- Died: 1 November 1962 (aged 20); Mexico City, Mexico

Formula One World Championship career
- Nationality: (Mexico) Mexican
- Active years: 1961–1962
- Team: Ferrari
- Entries: 6 (5 starts)
- Wins: 0
- Podiums: 0
- Career points: 4
- Pole positions: 0
- Fastest laps: 0
- First entry: 1961 Italian Grand Prix
- Last entry: 1962 Italian Grand Prix

24 Hours of Le Mans career
- Years: 1959–1962
- Teams: OSCA Automobili; N.A.R.T. SpA Ferrari SEFAC
- Best finish: 2nd (1960)

Ricardo Valentín Rodríguez de la Vega (14 February 1942 – 1 November 1962) was the first Mexican driver ever to take part in a Formula One Grand Prix, competing in the 1961 and 1962 Formula One seasons.

At the age of 19 years and 208 days, when first racing for Ferrari at the 1961 Italian Grand Prix, Rodríguez became the youngest Formula One driver to race for the Italian team, a title he held until the 2024 Saudi Arabian Grand Prix, where his record was broken by Briton Oliver Bearman at 18 years and 305 days old. At this Italian Grand Prix, he also became the youngest driver to start a Formula One race until the 1980 Canadian Grand Prix, and the youngest driver to start from the first row until the 2016 Belgian Grand Prix, and at the 1962 Belgian Grand Prix he also became the youngest driver to score points in Formula One, a record he held until the 2000 Brazilian Grand Prix. His death at the age of 20 in a crash during practice for the 1962 Mexican Grand Prix made him the youngest Formula One driver to die.

Rodríguez's elder brother, Pedro, was also a noted racing driver who had much success in both sports car racing and (starting in 1963) Formula One, including a season with Ferrari in 1969, who was killed in a crash during a sportscar race at the Norisring in 1971.

== Personal life ==
Rodríguez was born in Mexico City and was a child cycling champion who switched to motorcycles in domestic competition from the age of 11. He was the third son from the marriage of Pedro Natalio Rodríguez and Concepción "Conchita" (née de la Vega), he had three brothers and one sister, Pedro, Federico, Conchita and Alejandro.

Rodríguez was married to Sara (née Cardoso) in July 1961 but left no children. In the summer of 1962, his close friend, Jo Ramírez, would accompany him to his adventure in Europe.

== Career ==
Rodríguez won several national motorcycle titles, before taking up saloon car racing in his own Fiat Topolino. In 1957 he made his international debut at Riverside, beating all comers in the under 1.5 litre class in a Porsche RS. He then won his class in a Porsche Spyder in the Nassau Tourist Trophy. He often raced for the North American Racing Team (NART) with his brother Pedro, although he would also enter cars under his own team's name, Scuderia Rodríguez.

Rodríguez was refused an entry at Le Mans in 1958 because he was too young (16 years and 106 days), but went back in 1959 to race an OSCA in the 750cc class. In the edition of 24 Hours of Le Mans in 1960 he partnered André Pilette to second place. At 18 years and 133 days of age, he is the youngest driver ever to stand on the podium at Le Mans.

Rodríguez was given a guest drive by Ferrari for the 1961 Italian Grand Prix, qualifying a surprise second and becoming the youngest driver in history to start from front row (19 years and 208 days), a record that would not be beaten until the 2016 Belgian Grand Prix by Max Verstappen. In the race he exchanged the lead with Phil Hill and Richie Ginther many times, until a fuel pump failure ended his race. 1962 saw a full works drive with Ferrari, who used him sparingly considering his age and rough edges. Whenever used, Rodríguez shone, taking second at the Pau Grand Prix, fourth at the Belgian Grand Prix and sixth at the German Grand Prix in a tough year in Formula One for Ferrari. He also won the 1962 Targa Florio edition with Olivier Gendebien and Willy Mairesse in a Ferrari 246 SP.

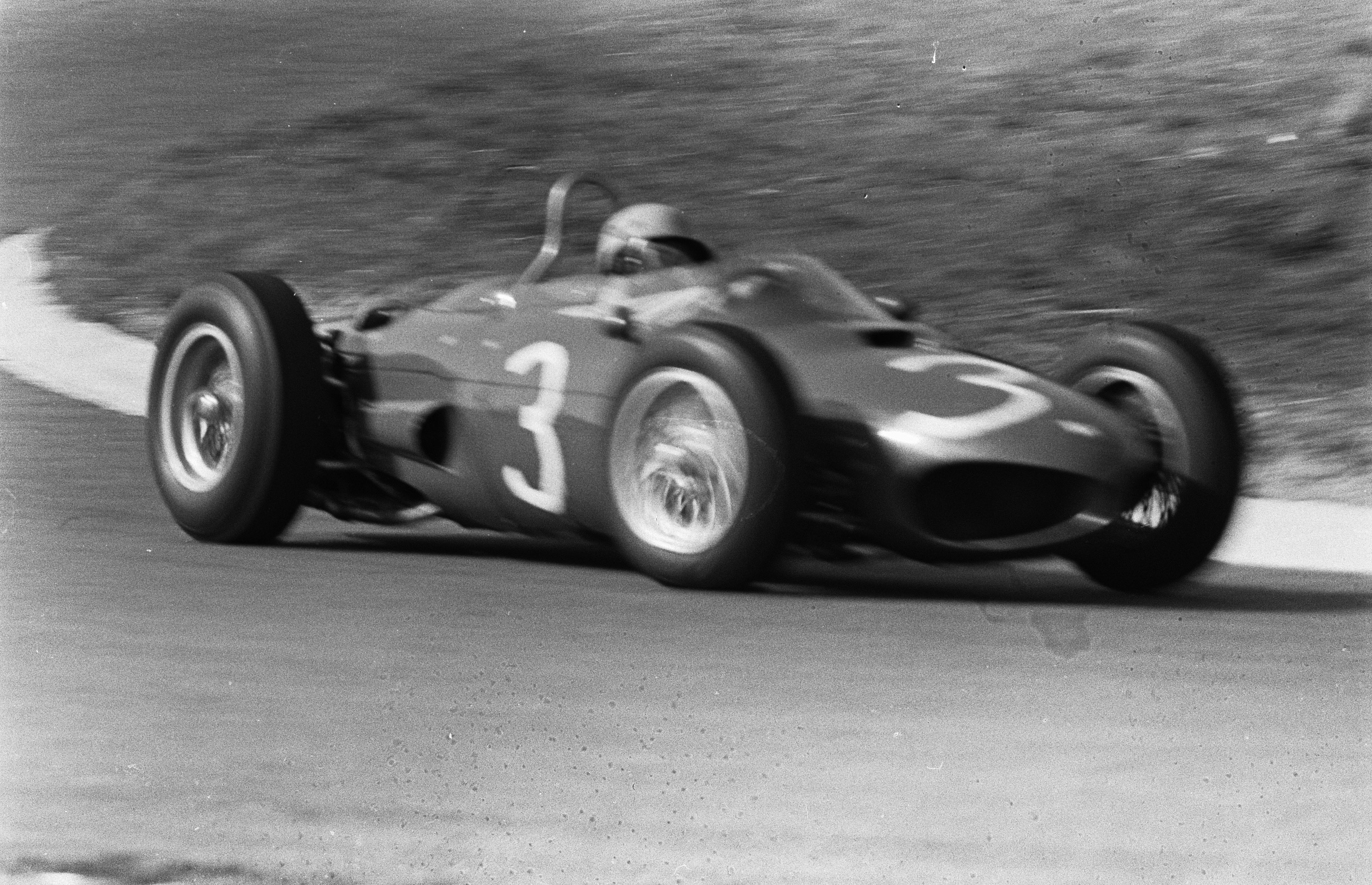
Ricardo Rodriguez, Ferrari 156, Practice, 1962 Dutch Grand Prix

Rodríguez was considered a potential future champion already, but was left without a drive when Ferrari opted not to enter the non-Championship 1962 Mexican Grand Prix at the Magdalena Mixiuhca Circuit, Mexico City. He signed to drive Rob Walker's Lotus 24, but died during the first day of unofficial practice, when the Lotus' rear right suspension failed at the fearsome Peraltada turn, and it hit the barriers, killing him almost instantaneously. He was 20 years old and his death provoked national mourning in Mexico.

The Scuderia Rodríguez A.C. (a friends and family foundation) keeps his memory and that of his brother alive. It serves as register for Rodríguez memorabilia and cars, certifying them, and its Secretary General Carlos Jalife published their biography in 2006, and a second edition came in 2015. He did an English translation that was published in 2009 and won the Motor Press Guild Book of the Year.

== Racing record ==
=== Complete Formula One World Championship results ===
(key)

| Year | Entrant | Chassis | Engine | 1 | 2 | 3 | 4 | 5 | 6 | 7 | 8 | 9 | WDC | Points |
|---|---|---|---|---|---|---|---|---|---|---|---|---|---|---|
| 1961 | Scuderia Ferrari | Ferrari 156 | Ferrari V6 | MON | NED | BEL | FRA | GBR | GER | ITA; Ret | USA | | NC | 0 |
| 1962 | Scuderia Ferrari | Ferrari 156 | Ferrari V6 | NED; Ret | MON; DNS | BEL; 4 | FRA | GBR | GER; 6 | ITA; 14† | USA | RSA | 13th | 4 |

† Driver did not finish the race, but was still classified.

=== Formula One non-championship results ===
(key) (Races in bold indicate pole position) (Races in italics indicate fastest lap)

| Year | Entrant | Chassis | Engine | 1 | 2 | 3 | 4 | 5 | 6 | 7 | 8 | 9 | 10 | 11 | 12 | 13 | 14 | 15 | 16 | 17 | 18 | 19 | 20 |
|---|---|---|---|---|---|---|---|---|---|---|---|---|---|---|---|---|---|---|---|---|---|---|---|
| 1962 | Scuderia Ferrari | Ferrari 156 | Ferrari V6 | CAP | BRX | LOM | LAV | GLV | PAU; 2 | AIN | INT | NAP | MAL | CLP | RMS; WD | SOL | KAN | MED | DAN | OUL | | | |
| 1962 | Rob Walker Racing Team | Lotus 24 | Climax V8 | | | | | | | | | | | | | | | | | | MEX; DNS | RAN | NAT |

=== Ricardo Rodríguez in the 24 Hours of Le Mans ===
| Year | Team | Num. | Car | Cat. | Co-driver | Grid | Laps | Result |
| Year | Team | Num. | Engine | Cat. | Co-driver | Grid | Hours | Result |
|---|---|---|---|---|---|---|---|---|
| 1958 | (United States) North American Racing Team | 25 | Ferrari 500 TR58 | S 2.0 | (France) José Behra | – | – | Did not start* |
| 1958 | (United States) North American Racing Team | 25 | Ferrari 2.0 L4 | S 2.0 | (France) José Behra | – | – | Did not start* |
| 1959 | (Italy) OSCA Automobili | 51 | OSCA Sport 750TN | S 750 | (Mexico) Pedro Rodríguez | 11° | 32 | Retire (Water pump) |
| 1959 | (Italy) OSCA Automobili | 51 | OSCA 0.7L L4 | S 750 | (Mexico) Pedro Rodríguez | 11° | 5h | Retire (Water pump) |
| 1960 | (United States) North American Racing Team | 17 | Ferrari 250 TRI/59 | S 3.0 | (Belgium) André Pilette | 9° | 310 | 2nd |
| 1960 | (United States) North American Racing Team | 17 | Ferrari 3.0L V12 | S 3.0 | (Belgium) André Pilette | 9° | 24h | 2nd |
| 1961 | (United States) North American Racing Team | 17 | Ferrari 250 TRI/61 | S 3.0 | (Mexico) Pedro Rodríguez | 2° | 305 | Retire (Engine) |
| 1961 | (United States) North American Racing Team | 17 | Ferrari 3.0L V12 | S 3.0 | (Mexico) Pedro Rodríguez | 2° | 23h | Retire (Engine) |
| 1962 | (Italy) SpA Ferrari SEFAC | 28 | Ferrari Ferrari 246 SP | E 3.0 | (Mexico) Pedro Rodríguez | 32° | 174 | Retire (Gear box) |
| 1962 | (Italy) SpA Ferrari SEFAC | 28 | Ferrari 2.4L V6 | E 3.0 | (Mexico) Pedro Rodríguez | 32° | 13h | Retire (Gear box) |

- On 1958 24 Hours of Le Mans judged to be too young, 16-year-old Ricardo Rodríguez was not allowed to start by the organisers, Automobile Club de l'Ouest, so was replaced by José Behra, brother of Jean, to accompany his older brother, Pedro Rodríguez.

| Preceded by Wolfgang von Trips | Formula One fatal accidents 1 November 1962 | Succeeded by Gary Hocking |
Records
| Preceded by Troy Ruttman; 20 years, 80 days (1950 Indianapolis 500) | Youngest driver to start a Formula One race 19 years, 208 days (1961 Italian Grand Prix) | Succeeded by Mike Thackwell; 19 years, 182 days (1980 Canadian GP) |
| Preceded by Bruce McLaren; 21 years, 253 days (1959 Monaco GP) | Youngest driver to score points in Formula One; 20 years, 123 days (1962 Belgian Grand Prix) | Succeeded by Jenson Button; 20 years, 67 days (2000 Brazilian GP) |
