= 1960 24 Hours of Le Mans =

28th 24 Hours of Le Mans endurance race

Previous: 1959	Next: 1961
Index: Races | Winners

The 1960 24 Hours of Le Mans was the 28th 24 Hours of Le Mans Grand Prix of Endurance, and took place on 25 and 26 June 1960, on Circuit de la Sarthe. It was the fifth and final round of the F.I.A. World Sports Car Championship as well as being the fifth round of the inaugural FIA GT Cup. It was held just a week after the tragic Belgian F1 GP in which two drivers were killed and Stirling Moss and another driver were seriously injured. The prospect of a duel between the 3-litre (180 cu in) Ferrari versus the 2-litre (120 cu in) Porsche championship-leaders was enough to draw large crowds to the 24 Hours race and some 200,000 spectators had gathered for Europe's classic sports car race, around the 13.5 km (8.4 mi) course.

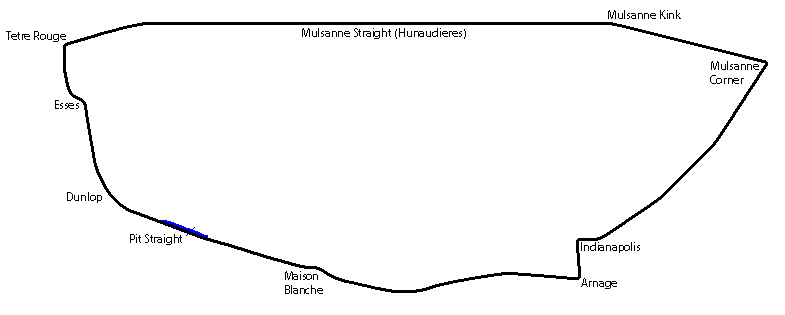
Le Mans in 1960

Faced with a must-win result to take the World Championship, Ferrari came well-prepared and with 13 entries, from the works and privateer teams. Their main competition would come from Maserati and the British teams, although American Corvettes also made an appearance in the GT-category. The race was barely three hours old when torrential rain hit the circuit causing a number of accidents and issues as water got into the engines. More and more rivals fell away through the night leaving Ferrari to dominate the race. In the end its Sports and GT cars taking 7 of the top 8 places, with only the Aston Martin of the Scottish Border Reivers team in 3rd breaking the sequence. Belgian Olivier Gendebien got his second victory, this time with his countryman, sports journalist/racing-driver, Paul Frère in the works car. Through fast, but reliable, driving they were never seriously threatened, finishing four laps and over 50 km ahead of the second-placed Ferrari.

== Regulations ==
After its overhaul of the GT classes in its Appendix J regulations, the CSI (Commission Sportive Internationale - the FIA’s regulations body) looked at retro-fitting them to the Appendix C rules for Sports Cars.

There were fourteen classes based on engine capacity (with a maximum of 5 L (305 cu in) although the World Championship was only open to a 3-litre (180 cu in) maximum) with corresponding set fuel tank sizes. But it was the minimum height and width of widescreens (based on those of GT cars) that caused controversy and after the first round in Argentina a number of senior drivers had protested about the danger in poor weather. There were also new provisions for minimum luggage space, carrying the spare wheel inboard, a minimum ground clearance of 120 mm (4.7 in) and a maximum turning-circle of 13.5 metres (44 ft).

Classes	Capacity	Fuel tank size
13 / 14 / 15	4.0, 5.0, 5.0+L	140 litres
11 / 12	2.5, 3.0L	120 litres
9 / 10	1.5-1.6, 2.0L	100 litres
7 / 8 / 9	1.15, 1.3, to 1.5L	80 litres
4 / 5 / 6	0.7, 0.85, 1.0L	60 litres

GT cars had to be at least 1,000 cc (61 cu in) and needed a minimum of 100 cars manufactured within 12 months. Although some bodywork changes could be done the net weight could not change by more than 5%.

With the new fuel-tank sizes, the Automobile Club de l'Ouest (ACO) dropped the minimum distance between fuel refills but kept the 25-lap limit for the other fluids. The maximum single-stint for a driver was increased to 52 laps (about 4 hours), although the total driver time was still 14 hours. To be classified, cars had to complete the last lap in less than 30 minutes, and stay within 20% of their nominated Index distance at every 6 hour interval.

To promote their new Index of Thermal Efficiency fuel-economy competition, this year the ACO increased the prize money at the expense of the older Index of Performance. After the 1960 currency devaluation, the winner's purse was now 30000 New Francs (about £6750 equivalent at the time) and 2000 New Francs respectively (and 50000 New Frances for the overall distance winner). The Index calculations were also tweaked slightly to account for the bigger windscreens reducing top speeds.

== Entries ==
The ACO received 72 entries for the event, of which only 58 were allowed to practice trying to qualify for the 55 places on the grid (increasing by one from the 54 of previous years). Official ‘works’ entries numbered 27, but a number of companies gave strong support to their customer teams. Going into the last race of the championship both Scuderia Ferrari and Porsche arrived with 4-car teams.

Category	Classes	Sports Entries	GT Entries	Total Entries
Large-engines	5.0+, 5.0, 4.0, 3.0, 2.5L	12	13	25
Medium-engines	2.0, 1.6, 1.3L	10 (+1 reserve)	7 (+2 reserves)	17
Small-engines	1.15, 1.0, 0.85L	13 (+4 reserves)	0	13
Total Cars		35 (+5 reserves)	20 (+2 reserves)	55 (+7 reserves)

With last year's winner Aston Martin having withdrawn from sports car racing to concentrate on Formula One, Ferrari were once again favourites, even though they had only won the opening round of the championship in Argentina and were trailing Porsche in the championship standings. Four works cars arrived: two were updated Testarossas and two were the new TRI chassis with independent suspension. Driving the updated TR59/60s this year the experienced pairing of Gendebien & Phil Hill were split up. Belgian Gendebien was paired with compatriot Paul Frère (who had been second in 1959 for Aston Martin), while Hill was driving with fellow Ferrari F1 team-member Wolfgang von Trips. One of the newer TRIs were driven by the other Scuderia F1 drivers Willy Mairesse/Richie Ginther and the second by Ludovico Scarfiotti/ Pedro Rodríguez. A 1959-model Testarossa was also run by Luigi Chinetti’s North American Racing Team (NART), driven by the younger Rodriguez brother, Ricardo and André Pilette.

Even though the company was still having financial difficulties, this year marked the successful return of Maserati to sports car racing with the highly competitive Tipo 61 ‘Birdcage’, raced by American Lloyd Casner's Camoradi Racing Team. The new team, sponsored by Goodyear tyres, had just caused an upset winning the previous race in the championship at the Nürburgring. Three cars were entered, driven by Casner himself with Jim Jeffords, Gino Munaron/Giorgio Scarlatti, while Masten Gregory and Chuck Daigh drove the updated original prototype. Designer Giulio Alfieri had carefully interpreted the CSI windscreen rules which specified a height but not an angle. So with a windscreen almost half the length of the car, it was very aerodynamic and very fast – reaching 170 mph (275 km/h) on the Mulsanne straight, compared to the Testarossa's 160 mph (255 km/h).

This year there were four British cars in the premier class. Ecurie Ecosse entered the 6-year old D-Type that had finished 2nd in 1957, modified with an enlarged windscreen and luggage hump, detracting from its formerly elegant lines. It was driven by Ron Flockhart and Bruce Halford. Their local rivals, Jock McBain's Border Reivers team ran an equally modified Aston Martin DBR, with the previous year's winner Roy Salvadori this year partnered with rising star Jim Clark. The Aston Martin that won that race had been bought by Ian Baillie, a Major in the Grenadier Guards who had Jack Fairman as co-driver.

The other British car caused a sensation and marked a welcome return to Le Mans for American Briggs Cunningham. Jaguar Cars had worked with Cunningham, their New York dealer, to prepare one of their new E-type prototypes for competition. The 3-litre XK-engine developed 290 bhp (against the Testarossa's 300 bhp) giving a top speed of 158 mph (254 km/h). Americans Dan Gurney and Walt Hansgen were the drivers.

After two outright wins (at Sebring and the Targa Florio) Porsche came to Le Mans as leaders of the Championship with its new RS60 variant. But with a top speed of only 145 mph (235 kp/h) they would be no match for the bigger cars on the long straight. Working with the new rules, they fitted two cars with special 1606cc engines (generating 180 bhp) to put them into the 2-litre category with the consequent bigger fuel tank. They were also the only team to fit wipers on both the inside and outside of the windscreens. This year the works cars were driven by Jo Bonnier/Graham Hill and Hans Herrmann/ Maurice Trintignant. Edgar Barth / Wolfgang Seidel drove the regular RS60, supported again by the two privateer entries from Carel Godin de Beaufort and Jean Kerguen.

Triumph returned to take on the Porsches with their TRS prototype of the upcoming TR4, led once again by former winner Ninian Sanderson. The privateer MG that raced the previous year also returned. In the smaller classes there were single entries from Alfa Romeo and the new Lola company competing in the S-1150 class. The Lola Mk 1 was fitted with the Coventry Climax FWA engine, developing 90 bhp. It was also the lightest car in the field, only 567 kg (1,250 lb)

In the next class down, S-1000, two works DB-Panhards would vie with Austin-Healey returning to the circuit with their new Sprite. In the busy smallest class there were eleven entries including four DB-Panhards, as well as Stanguellini, OSCA and a trio of cars from Fiat performance-specialists Abarth. Reflecting changing times, the six DB-Panhard sports were the only French cars in the field this year.

There were 22 entries in the GT classes. The largest cars in the race were four 4.6-litre (280 cu in) V8 Chevrolet Corvettes after a good showing at Sebring. The Rochester smallblock engine generated over 300 bhp and got up to 150 mph (240 km/h). Stopping the heavy cars would be an issue and many thought they would suffer from brake problems on the tight corners like at the end of the long Mulsanne Straight. Three were entered by Briggs Cunningham, returning to Le Mans after five years away. He drove one with Bill Kimberly, with the others by Dick Thompson/Fred Windridge and Cunningham team-regular John Fitch/Bob Grossman. The fourth Corvette was entered by the Camoradi team.

Up against them was a squadron of eight Ferrari 250 GT Berlinettas. Forghieri's new short-wheelbase variant had just been homologated on raceweek. The V12 3-litre engine produced 280 bhp with a top speed of 160 mph (255 km/h). Three were entered by Chinetti's NART, two more by the Belgian Ecurie Francorchamps and Equipe Nationale Belge. There were also entries from the new Italian Scuderia Serenissima, Graham Whitehead (changing from running Jaguar and Aston Martin) and Le Mans local Fernand Tavano who had only received his car at the start of the week.

Lotus dominated the middle categories with the five Elites. One of the three works cars had been given the 2-litre (120 cu in) FPF Climax engine to enter the GT-2000 class against a pair of privateer AC Aces. Porsche entered a new coupé version of the 356, styled by Abarth and capable of over 140 mph (225 km/h). It would be driven by Herbert Linge and Heini Walter.

== Practice ==
After the success last year, the ACO was again able to close the public roads on 9 April. Fourteen cars took advantage of the 10 hours of extended testing time.

Official qualifying was held over two sessions for a total of 540 minutes over the two days and there were two major accidents. On Wednesday evening after having just done a fast qualifying lap, Dan Gurney in his Jaguar E2A collided at 150 mph (240 km/h) with Fritz d’Orey's Sc. Serenissima Ferrari GT. D’Orey's car speared off the track and hit a roadside tree with such force that it broke the car in two. The young Brazilian suffered severe head injuries that kept him in hospital for 8 months. On Thursday, Jonathon Sieff's Team Lotus car had catastrophic suspension collapse while on the Mulsanne straight. He hit a small hut and the Marks & Spencer heir was badly injured. Out of caution, Lotus withdrew its 2-litre (120 cu in) GT as it was fitted with the same suspension units.

On Friday, when the roads were public domain once again, the repaired Jaguar went out for test laps finding its handling was not perfect.

== Race ==
=== Start ===
With no Stirling Moss at the race, it was the equally fleet-footed Jim Clark who was first away in his Aston Martin. But he was soon overtaken, firstly by Walt Hansgen in the Jaguar prototype, then the extremely fast Camoradi Maserati. After a delayed start Masten Gregory blasted past twenty cars to be leading at the end of the first lap. He set about building a considerable lead, getting out to 70 seconds at the end of an incident-free first hour. The five Testarossas, led by Gendebien, were 2nd through 6th, then came the Ecosse Jaguar, Scarlatti's Maserati and Tavano leading the GT classes ahead of Clark in 10th.

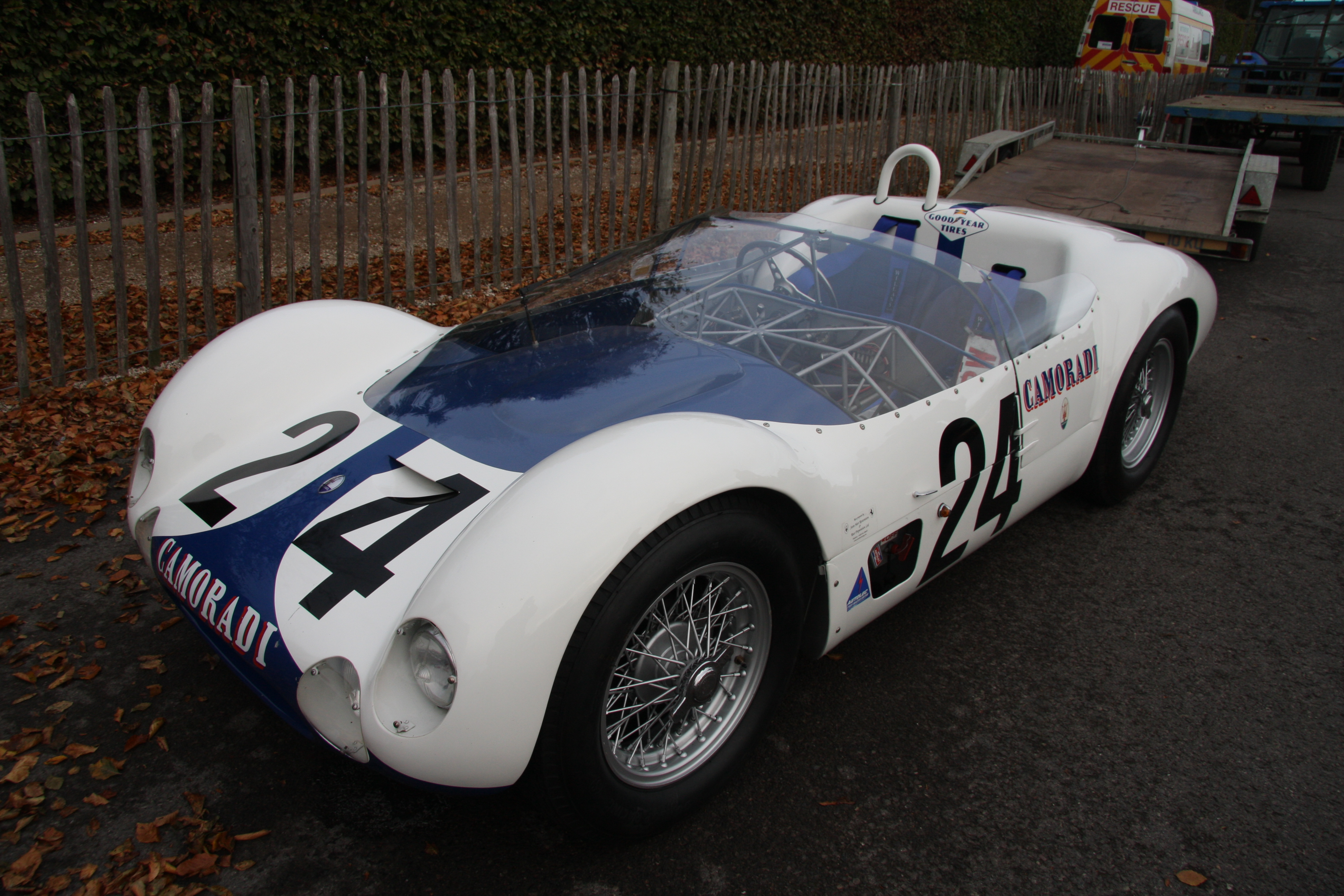
The Maserati Tipo 61 of Gregory and Daigh, which led early but retired due to electrical issues.

But it was as the first pit-stops were approaching that things started going wrong. The increased drag on the enlarged windscreens meant fuel consumption was increased. Two of the Ferraris, pushing hard to keep up with the Maserati were caught out and both von Trips and Scarfiotti ran out of fuel ending up marooned out on the track on their 22nd lap. Gendebien was extremely lucky to run out just as he approached the pits, and coasted into his pit-box. Then when Gregory brought in the Maserati from the lead to refuel and change drivers the car refused to restart. They lost nearly an hour, and 11 laps, while the starter motor was replaced. Rejoining in 46th place they made up 17 places before soaked electrics put them out after midnight. Refueled, Frère, then Gendebien, took a lead they would never relinquish.

Going into the third hour it started to rain heavily, even hailing at times, creating havoc on the track. With the windscreens impossible to see through, many drivers pitted for cushions to allow them to see over the screens. Bill Kimberley had just taken over Cunningham's Corvette, sent out by his team manager on slick tyres when he aquaplaned off at Maison Blanche, rolled end-over-end twice then slid down the grass ending right side up. Fortunately Kimberly was unhurt.

At 8pm, after four hours, Gendebien and Frère had a lap's lead over the field. Gunther/Mairesse led the chase ahead of the NART Ferrari and Ecosse Jaguar then, a lap further back, the Aston Martin & Tavano leading the GT classes.

=== Night ===
Going into the night, with the better handling Aston Martin, and superb car control, Clark and Salvadori were able to catch up and overtake the Ferraris, getting up to second place soon after 11pm. The rain then eased allowing the power of the Ferraris to come to bear again. At midnight, after 8 hours racing, Gendebien still led from Ginther/Mairesse, then the Aston Martin, Rodriguez’ Ferrari and the Ecosse Jaguar. In 6th was Whitehead's Ferrari leading the GTs, chased by the Fitch/Grossman Corvette and the French & Belgian Ferrari GTs. In 10th was the first Porsche, of Barth/Seidel, with a handy lead over the rest of the smaller cars.

The final Maserati (Casner's own) retired with engine issues likely caused by debris from Casner's slip into the Tertre Rouge sand-trap. The E-type lost three laps at the start with fuel-injection issues, had fought back to the edge of the top-10, lost time again with burnt pistons, then retired with a blown head gasket after midnight.

Later through the night, Pedro Rodriguez put in very fast laps moving up from 5th to catch, pass and then lap Mairesse into 2nd, only to lose it again when he was stopped for ten minutes to fix a misfire. The Ecosse Jaguar had been running alternately 3rd and 4th through the night until at dawn at 5.30am, when it came to a halt at Arnage with a broken camshaft. The D-type couldn't go back to racing for the rest of the event.

=== Morning ===
By Sunday morning, the rain had cleared and the sun was shining. About 8.15am, with Gendebien/ Frère now holding a 5-lap lead, the Ginther/Mairesse Ferrari's gearbox gave up, handing second place back to the NART car, now well ahead of the Aston Martin. Through most of the race the Laureau/Armagnac DB had been leading the Index of Performance from the Guichet/Condriller Abarth, with one of the Porsches back in 3rd. The Porsches had been falling away through the night. After being delayed at the start, the Hill/Bonnier car had got back up to 14th until it too was stopped with engine problems. It was the smaller car of Barth/Seidel that had been the best performer, getting up to 9th and mixing it with the Ferrari and Corvette GTs before it started getting gearbox problems.

The Ferrari GTs had all been running strongly. The Whitehead/Taylor car, after initially leading the GT pack until midnight, had been chasing the French Ferrari of Tavano running in 4th. Then at 12.45, when Taylor was travelling at full speed down the Mulsanne straight, the engine detonated with such force it blew the bonnet off the car.

=== Finish and post-race ===
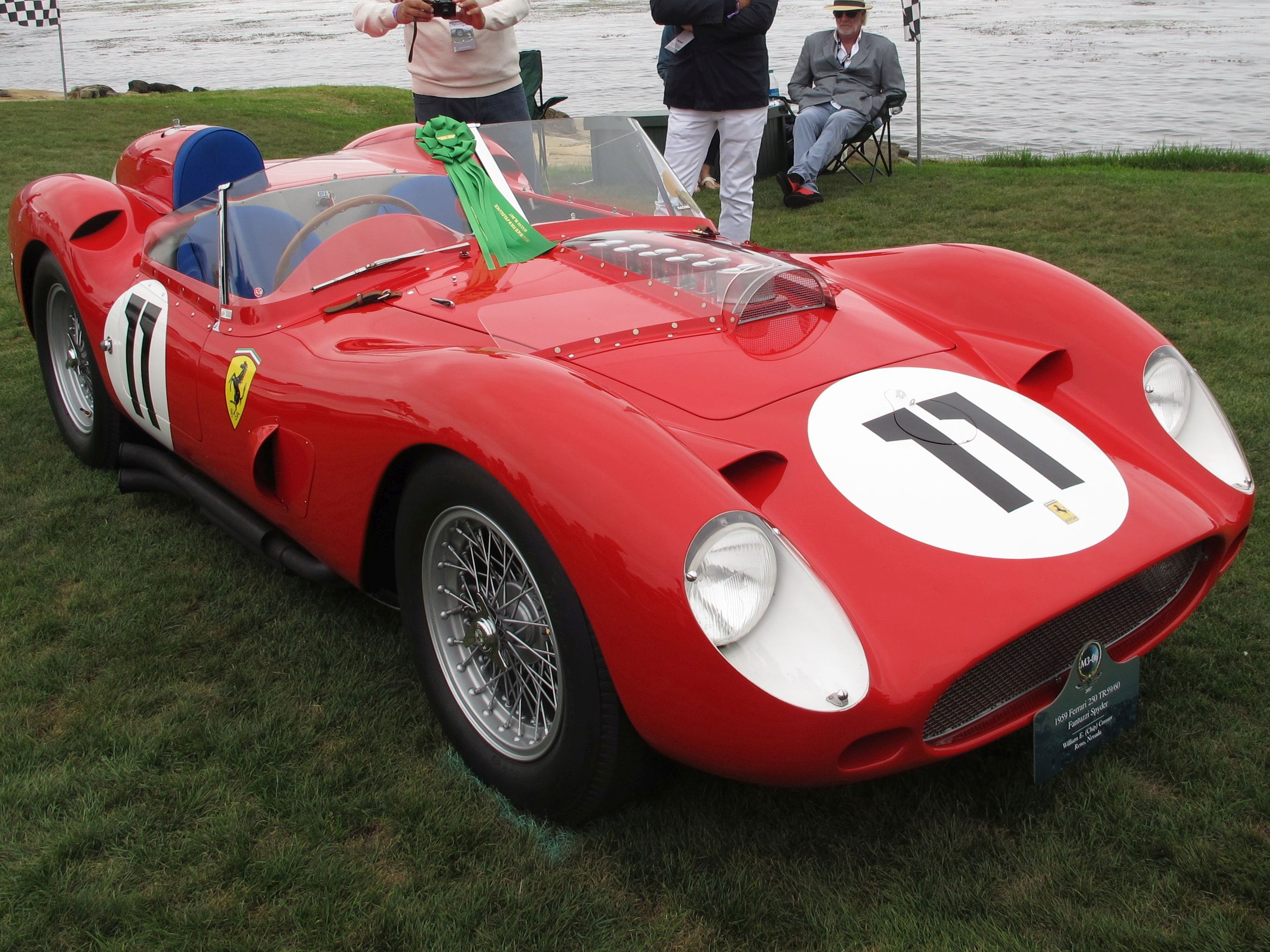
The winning Ferrari 250 TR59/60 of Gendebien and Frère.

With the retirements, the remaining Corvette of Fitch/Grossman had moved up to 6th. Then with barely two hours Grossman came in with no water, well before the next fluid refill. Fetching ice from their VIP tent, the crew packed it around the engine instructing the driver to do 10-minute laps, attracting great attention from the crowd. Then the gearbox of the Barth Porsche lost three of it gears with a couple of hours to go. The team parked it up waiting for the last quarter-hour to make a fraught final lap. In the meantime it was overtaken by the Porsche GT that finished 10th.

Otherwise, the last part of the race was processional. The winning partnership of Gendebien and Frère, averaged a speed of 106.201 mph (170.914 km/h), and their winning margin over the second placed crew was four laps, driven by Ricardo Rodríguez and André Pilette. Coming home third, a further four laps adrift, was 1959 winner Roy Salvadori with Jim Clark in their Aston Martin, breaking up the Ferrari train. The Ferrari GTs followed up their 3-4-5-6 result in 1959 with a 4-5-6-7, forming up in a formation finish behind the leading Testarossas. The Corvette struggled on, finishing 8th, before the engine seized completely just after the finishing line. The other Aston Martin, despite leaking oil for most of the race, stayed consistent and finished 9th.

Once again the bullet-proof Panhard-engined DBs performed very well, four of the five cars finishing. The 851 cc (51.9 cu in) coupé of Bouharde and Jaeger ran an impressive 32 mpg_{‑imp} (8.8 L/100 km; 27 mpg_{‑US}) fuel economy. The open-top spyder of Armagnac and Laureau comfortably won the Index of Performance going over 25% than its nominal distance. They were also the final winners of the Biennial Cup for best performance over consecutive years.

But it was the two surviving Lotus Elites that carried off the Thermal Efficiency prize – the works car just beating the French privateer entry. The three Triumphs staged a formation finish, however after battling valve problems all race none could cover their mandatory distance and were not classified. British cars also won class trophies – the privateer MG was first 2-litre car home and the Austin-Healey Sprite beat the DBs in the 1-litre class.

Three of four drivers from the first two cars were Belgian. The Belgian Prince de Mérode was the honorary starter in his role as President of the FIA, and was on hand to congratulate his countrymen at the end of the race. Likewise, the Belgian king sent telegrams of congratulations to the drivers. After this success, Paul Frère retired from racing, resuming his regular employment as a motoring journalist and consultant on motor-racing regulations.

== Official results ==
=== Finishers ===
Results taken from Quentin Spurring's book, officially licensed by the ACO Class winners are in Bold text.

Pos	Class	No	Team	Drivers	Chassis	Engine	Laps
1	**S3.0**	**11**	(Italy) **Scuderia Ferrari**	(Belgium) **Olivier Gendebien** (Belgium) **Paul Frère**	Ferrari 250 TR59/60	Ferrari 3.0L V12	314
2	S3.0	17	(United States) North American Racing Team	(Belgium) André Pilette (Mexico) Ricardo Rodríguez	Ferrari 250 TR59	Ferrari 3.0L V12	310
3	S3.0	7	(United Kingdom) Border Reivers	(United Kingdom) Roy Salvadori (United Kingdom) Jim Clark	Aston Martin DBR1/300	Aston Martin 3.0L S6	306
4	**GT3.0**	**16**	(France) **F. Tavano** (private entrant)	(France) **Fernand Tavano** (France) **“Loustel” (Pierre Dumay)**	Ferrari 250 GT SWB	Ferrari 3.0L V12	302
5	GT3.0	18	(United States) North American Racing Team	(United States) George Arents (United States) Alan Connell, Jr	Ferrari 250 GT SWB	Ferrari 3.0L V12	300
6	GT3.0	22	(Belgium) Ecurie Francorchamps	(Belgium) “Eldé” (Leon Dernier) (Belgium) Pierre Noblet	Ferrari 250 GT SWB	Ferrari 3.0L V12	300
7	GT3.0	19	(United States) North American Racing Team	(United States) Ed Hugus (United States) Augie Pabst	Ferrari 250 GT SWB	Ferrari 3.0L V12	299
8	**GT5.0**	**3**	(United States) **B.S. Cunningham**	(United States) **John Fitch** (United States) **Bob Grossman**	Chevrolet Corvette C1 Coupé	Chevrolet 4.6L V8	281
9	S3.0	8	(United Kingdom) Maj I.B. Baillie (private entrant)	(United Kingdom) Ian Baillie (United Kingdom) Jack Fairman	Aston Martin DBR1/300	Aston Martin 3.0L S6	281
N/C*	GT5.0	4	(United States) Camoradi USA	(United States) Fred Gamble (United States) Leon Lilley	Chevrolet Corvette C1 Coupé	Chevrolet 4.6L V8	275
10	**GT1.6**	**35**	(West Germany) **Porsche KG**	(West Germany) **Herbert Linge** (West Germany) **Hans Walter**	Porsche 356 B Carrera GTL Abarth	Porsche 1588cc F4	269
11	**S1.6**	**39**	(West Germany) **Porsche KG**	(East Germany) **Edgar Barth** (West Germany) **Wolfgang Seidel**	Porsche 718 RS60/4	Porsche 1498cc F4	264
12	**S2.0**	**32**	(United Kingdom) **E. Lund** (private entrant)	(United Kingdom) **Ted Lund** (United Kingdom) **Colin Escott**	MG MGA Twin Cam Coupé	BMC 1762cc S4	262
13	**GT1.3**	**44**	(France) **R. Masson** (private entrant)	(France) **Roger Masson** (France) **Claude Laurent**	Lotus Elite	Coventry Climax; FWE 1216cc S4	261
14	GT1.3	41	(United Kingdom) Team Lotus Engineering	(United Kingdom) John Wagstaff (United Kingdom) Tony Marsh	Lotus Elite	Coventry Climax; FWE 1216cc S4	257
N/C*	S2.0	28	(United Kingdom) Standard Triumph Ltd	(United Kingdom) Keith Ballisat (France) Marcel Becquart	Triumph TRS	Triumph 1985cc S4	256
15	**S850**	**48**	(France) **Automobiles**; **Deutsch et Bonnet**	(France) **Gérard Laureau** (France) **Paul Armagnac**	D.B. HBR-4 LM	Panhard 702cc supercharged F2	253
N/C*	S2.0	59 (reserve)	(United Kingdom) Standard Triumph Ltd	(United Kingdom) Les Leston (United States) Mike Rothschild	Triumph TRS	Triumph 1985cc S4	252
N/C*	S2.0	29	(United Kingdom) Standard Triumph Ltd	(United Kingdom) Ninian Sanderson (United Kingdom) Peter Bolton	Triumph TRS	Triumph 1985cc S4	249
16	**S1.0**	**46**	(United Kingdom) **Donald Healey Motor Company**	(United Kingdom) **John Dalton** (United States) **John Colgate**	Austin-Healey Sprite Spyder.	BMC 571cc S4	246
17	S1.0	47	(France) Automobiles; Deutsch et Bonnet	(France) Pierre Lelong (France) Maurice van der Bruwaene	D.B. HBR-5	Panhard 851cc F2	244
N/C*	GT2.0	30	(Switzerland) Ecurie Lausannoise	(Switzerland) André Wicky (Switzerland) Georges Gachnang	AC Ace Coupé	Bristol 1971cc S6	239
18	S850	54	(United States) E. Hugus (private entrant)	(United States) John Bentley (United States) John Gordon	O.S.C.A. Nuevo Sport 750	OSCA 746cc S4	237
19	S1.0	56	(France) Automobiles; Deutsch et Bonnet	(France) Robert Bourharde (France) Jean-François Jaeger	D.B. HBR-4 Coupé	Panhard 851cc F2	228
20	S1.0	52	(France) Automobiles; Deutsch et Bonnet	(France) René Bartholoni (France) Bernard de Saint-Auban	D.B. HBR-4 Super Rallye	Panhard 851cc F2	223

- Note *: Not Classified because car failed to complete 80% of its Index of Performance distance.

=== Did not finish ===
Pos	Class	No	Team	Drivers	Chassis	Engine	Laps	Reason
DNF	GT3.0	15	(United Kingdom) A.G. Whitehead (private entrant)	(United Kingdom) Graham Whitehead (United Kingdom) Henry Taylor	Ferrari 250 GT SWB	Ferrari 3.0L V12	258	Engine (21hr)
DNF	GT3.0	20	(United States) North American Racing Team	(France) Jo Schlesser (United States) Bill Sturgis	Ferrari 250 GT California	Ferrari 3.0L V12	253	Engine (22hr)
DNF	GT5.0	2	(United States) B.S. Cunningham	(United States) Dick Thompson (United States) Fred Windridge	Chevrolet Corvette C1 Coupé	Chevrolet 4.6L V8	207	Fire (20hr)
DNF	S3.0	10	(Italy) Scuderia Ferrari	(United States) Richie Ginther (Belgium) Willy Mairesse	Ferrari 250 TRI/60	Ferrari 3.0L V12	204	Gearbox (17hr)
DNF	S2.0	33	(West Germany) Porsche KG	(Sweden) Joakim ‘Jo’ Bonnier (United Kingdom) Graham Hill	Porsche 718 RS60/4	Porsche 1606cc F4	191	Engine (18hr)
DNF	S1.6	38	(Netherlands) G. de Beaufort (private entrant)	(Netherlands) Carel Godin de Beaufort (United Kingdom) Richard “Dickie” Stoop	Porsche 718 RS60/4	Porsche 1587cc F4	180	Engine (17hr)
DNF	S850	50	(Italy) Abarth & Cie	(France) Jean Guichet (France) Paul Condrillier	Abarth 850S	Fiat 847cc S4	174	Clutch (17hr)
DNF	GT1.3	43	(United Kingdom) G. Baillie (private entrant)	(United Kingdom) Sir Gawaine Baillie (United Kingdom) Mike Parkes	Lotus Elite	Coventry Climax; FWE 1216cc S4	169	Gearbox (17hr)
DNF	S3.0	5	(United Kingdom) Ecurie Ecosse	(United Kingdom) Ron Flockhart (United Kingdom) Bruce Halford	Jaguar D-Type	Jaguar 3.0L S6	168	Crankshaft (14hr)
DNF	GT1.3	42	(United Kingdom) Team Lotus Engineering	(United Kingdom) David Buxton (United Kingdom) Bill Allen	Lotus Elite	Coventry Climax; FWE 1216cc S4	157	Clutch (18hr)
DNF	S1.15	45	(United Kingdom) Lola Ltd.	(Switzerland) Charles Vögele (United Kingdom) Peter Ashdown	Lola Mk. 1	Coventry Climax; FWA 1098cc S4	148	Engine (19hr)
DNF	GT2.0	57	(France) J. Rambaud (private entrant)	(France) Jean Rambaud (France) Pierre Boutin	AC Ace	Bristol 1971cc S6	130	Piston (14hr)
DNF	S850	55	(Italy) Automobili Stanguellini	(Italy) Raymond Quilico (Portugal) Carlos Manuel Reis	Stanguellini Sport	Fiat 741cc S4	103	Engine (20hr)
DNF	S1.15	40	(Italy) Squadra Virgilio Conrero	(France) Bernard Costen (Italy) Francesco de Leonibus	Conrero-Alfa Romeo 1150 Sport	Alfa Romeo 1147cc S4	96	Gearbox (17hr)
DNF	S3.0	25	(United States) Camoradi USA	(United States) Lloyd 'Lucky' Casner (United States) Jim Jeffords	Maserati Tipo 61	Maserati 2.9L S4	95	Gearbox (11hr)
DNF	S1.6	36	(France) J. Kerguen (private entrant)	(France) Jean Kerguen (Morocco) Robert La Caze	Porsche 718 RS60/4	Porsche 1587cc F4	92	Camshaft (8hr)
DNF	GT3.0	23	(United Kingdom) J.G. Sears (private entrant)	(United Kingdom) Jack Sears (United Kingdom) Peter Riley	Austin-Healey 3000	BMC 2.9L S6	89	Bearing (11hr)
DNF	S3.0	6	(United States) B.S. Cunningham	(United States) Dan Gurney (United States) Walt Hansgen	Jaguar E2A	Jaguar 3.0L S6	89	Head gasket (10hr)
DNF	S850	49	(Italy) Abarth & Cie	(France) Jacques Féret (Switzerland) Tony Spychiger	Abarth 850S	Fiat 847cc S4	86	Clutch (13hr)
DNF	S3.0	24	(United States) Camoradi USA	(United States) Masten Gregory (United States) Chuck Daigh	Maserati Tipo 60/61	Maserati 2.9L S4	82	Electrics (9hr)
DNF	S850	53	(Italy) Automobili OSCA	(France) André Simon (France) Jean Laroche	O.S.C.A. Nuevo Sport 750	OSCA 746cc S4	66	Engine (7hr)
DNF	GT1.3	63 (reserve)	(Italy) G. Ubezzi (private entrant)	(Italy) Giorgio Ubezzi (France) José Rosinski	Alfa Romeo Giulietta Sprint Zagato	Alfa Romeo 1290cc S4	66	Transmission (10hr)
DNF	S2.0	34	(West Germany) Porsche KG	(West Germany) Hans Herrmann (France) Maurice Trintignant	Porsche 718 RS60/4	Porsche 1606cc F4	57	Piston (6hr)
DNF	GT5.0	1	(United States) B.S. Cunningham	(United States) Briggs Cunningham (United States) Bill Kimberley	Chevrolet Corvette C1 Coupé	Chevrolet 4.6L V8	32	Accident (3hr)
DNF	S850	60 (reserve)	(Italy) Abarth & Cie	(Italy) Giancarlo Rigamonti (Italy) Remo Cattini	Abarth 700S	Fiat 705cc S4	31	Engine (4hr)
DNF	S850	51	(France) Automobiles; Deutsch et Bonnet	(France) Jean-Claude Vidilles (France) Jean Vinatier	D.B. HBR-4	Panhard 702cc F2	30	Engine (4hr)
DNF	GT3.0	21	(Belgium) Equipe Nationale Belge	(Belgium) “Beurlys” (Jean Blaton) (Belgium) Lucien Bianchi	Ferrari 250 GT SWB	Ferrari 3.0L V12	29	Accident (3hr)
DNF	S3.0	26	(United States) Camoradi USA	(Italy) Gino Munaron (Italy) Giorgio Scarlatti	Maserati Tipo 61	Maserati 2.9L S4	22	Electrics (3hr)
DNF	S3.0	12	(Italy) Scuderia Ferrari	(Italy) Ludovico Scarfiotti (Mexico) Pedro Rodríguez	Ferrari 250 TRI/60	Ferrari 3.0L V12	22	Out of fuel (3hr)
DNF	S3.0	9	(Italy) Scuderia Ferrari	(United States) Phil Hill (West Germany) Wolfgang von Trips	Ferrari 250 TR59/60	Ferrari 3.0L V12	22	Out of fuel (3hr)

=== Did not start ===
Pos	Class	No	Team	Drivers	Chassis	Engine	Reason
DNS	GT3.0	14	(Italy) Scuderia Serenissima	(Brazil) Frederico ‘Fritz’ d’Orey (Italy) Carlo Maria Abate	Ferrari 250 GT SWB	Ferrari 3.0L V12	Practice Accident
DNS	GT1.3	62 (reserve)	(United Kingdom) Team Lotus Engineering	(United Kingdom) Jonathon Sieff (United Kingdom) Chris Martin	Lotus Elite	Coventry Climax; FWE 1216cc S4	Practice Accident
DNS	S2.0	31	(United Kingdom) Team Lotus Engineering	(United Kingdom) Innes Ireland (United Kingdom) Sir John Whitmore	Lotus Elite	Coventry Climax FPF 1964cc S4	Withdrawn
DNA	S2.0	58	(Belgium) C. Goethals (private entrant)	(Belgium) Christian Goethals (Belgium) André Pilette	Porsche 356 GS	Porsche 1588cc F4	Withdrawn
DNA	S750	61 (reserve)	(Italy) Automobili Stanguellini	(France) Paul Guiraud (France) Gilbert Foury	Stanguellini 750 Sport	Fiat 741cc S4	Withdrawn
DNA	S850	64 (reserve)	(France) Automobiles; Deutsch et Bonnet	(France) Paul Justamond (France) Gérard Laureau	D.B. HBR-5	Panhard 851cc F2	Withdrawn
DNA	S850	65 (reserve)	(France) Société E.F.A.C.		Stanguellini EFAC 750 Sport	Fiat 701cc S4	Withdrawn

=== Class winners ===
Class	Winners		Class	Winners	
Sports 5000	no entrants		Grand Touring 5000	#3 Chevrolet Corvette C1 Coupé	Fitch / Grossman
Sports 4000	no entrants		Grand Touring 4000	no entrants	
Sports 3000	#11 Ferrari 250 TR 59/60	Gendebien / Frère	Grand Touring 3000	#16 Ferrari 250 GT SWB	Tavano / Loustel
Sports 2500	no entrants		Grand Touring 2500	no entrants	
Sports 2000	#32 MGA Twin Cam Coupé	Lund / Escott	Grand Touring 2000	no classified finishers	
Sports 1600	#39 Porsche 718 RS60/4	Barth / Seidel	Grand Touring 1600	#35 Porsche 356 B Carrera GTL Abarth	Linge / Walter
Sports 1300	no entrants		Grand Touring 1300	#44 Lotus Elite	Masson / Laurent
Sports 1150	no finishers		Grand Touring 1150	no entrants	
Sports 1000	#46 Austin-Healey Sprite Spyder	Dalton / Colgate	Grand Touring 1000	no entrants	
Sports 850	#48 D.B. HBR-4 LM	Laureau / Armagnac	Grand Touring 850	no entrants	

=== Index of Thermal Efficiency ===
Pos	Class	No	Team	Drivers	Chassis	Score
1	GT1.3	41	(United Kingdom) Team Lotus Engineering	(United Kingdom) John Wagstaff (United Kingdom) Tony Marsh	Lotus Elite	1.04
2	GT1.3	44	(France) R. Masson (private entrant)	(France) Roger Masson (France) Claude Laurent	Lotus Elite	1.03
3	S1.0	56	(France) Automobiles; Deutsch et Bonnet	(France) Robert Bourharde (France) Jean-François Jaeger	D.B. HBR-4 Coupé	0.98
4	S3.0	7	(United Kingdom) Border Reivers	(United Kingdom) Roy Salvadori (United Kingdom) Jim Clark	Aston Martin DBR1/300	0.95
5	S1.0	46	(United Kingdom) Donald Healey Motor Company	(United Kingdom) John Dalton (United States) John Colgate	Austin-Healey Sprite Spyder	0.95
6	S1.0	52	(France) Automobiles; Deutsch et Bonnet	(France) René Bartholoni (France) Bernard de Saint-Auban	D.B. HBR-4 Super Rallye	0.91
7	GT3.0	16	(France) F. Tavano (private entrant)	(France) Fernand Tavano (France) “Loustel” (Pierre Dumay)	Ferrari 250 GT SWB	0.89
8	S850	48	(France) Automobiles; Deutsch et Bonnet	(France) Gérard Laureau (France) Paul Armagnac	D.B. HBR-4 LM	0.86
9	S1.6	39	(West Germany) Porsche KG	(East Germany) Edgar Barth (West Germany) Wolfgang Seidel	Porsche 718 RS60/4	0.71

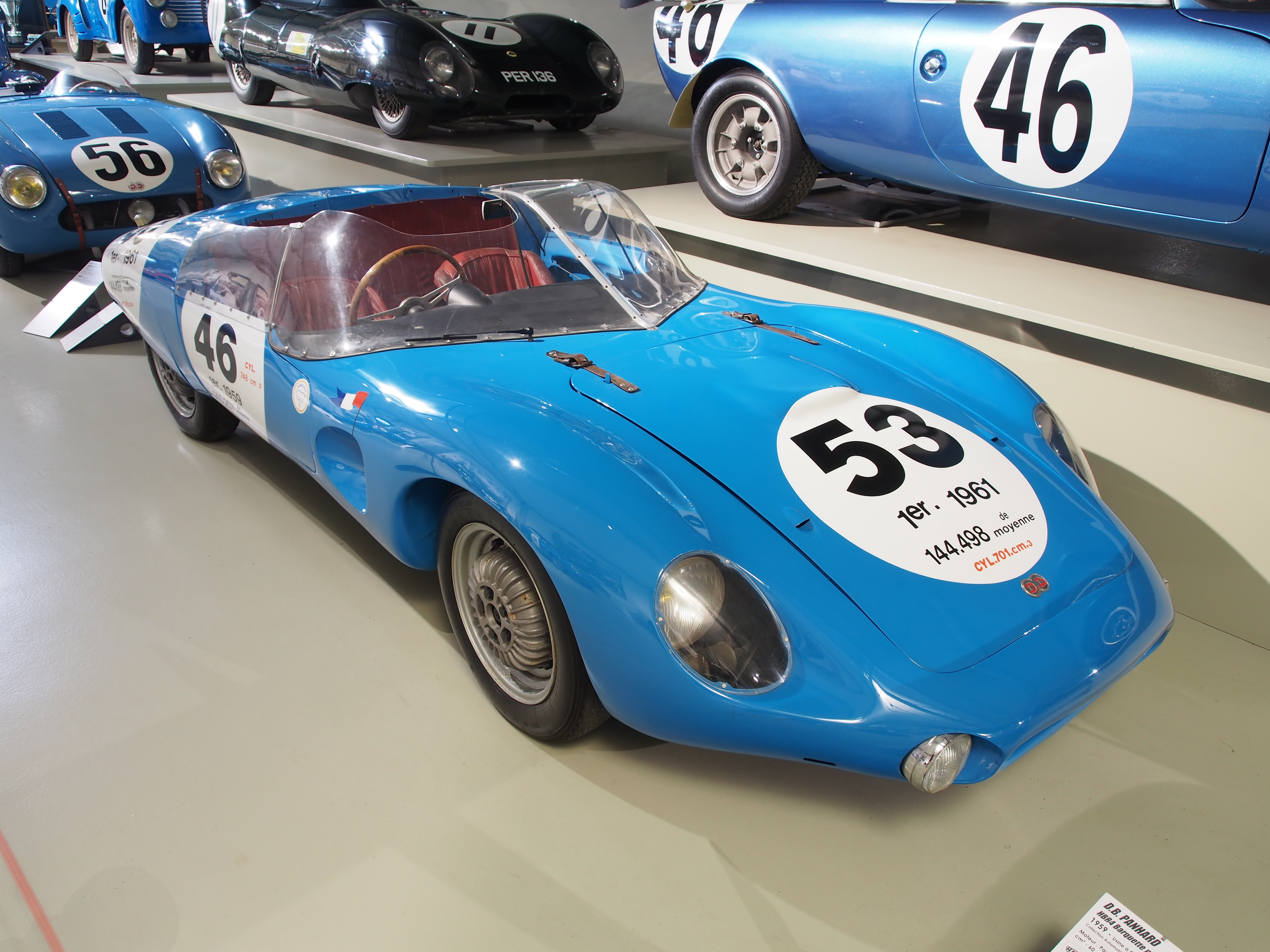
The DB HBR4 Spyder of Laureau/Armagnac, which won the Sports 850 class and the Index of Performance.

=== Index of Performance ===
Pos	Class	No	Team	Drivers	Chassis	Score
1	S850	48	(France) Automobiles; Deutsch et Bonnet	(France) Gérard Laureau (France) Paul Armagnac	D.B. HBR-4 LM	1.257
2	S3.0	11	(Italy) Scuderia Ferrari	(Belgium) Olivier Gendebien (Belgium) Paul Frère	Ferrari 250 TR59/60	1.157
3	S850	54	(United States) E. Hugus (private entrant)	(United States) John Bentley (United States) John Gordon	O.S.C.A. Nuevo Sport 750	1.151
4	S3.0	17	(United States) North American Racing Team	(Belgium) André Pilette (Mexico) Ricardo Rodríguez	Ferrari 250 TR59	1.142
5	S1.0	47	(France) Automobiles; Deutsch et Bonnet	(France) Pierre Lelong (France) Maurice van der Bruwaene	D.B. HBR-5	1.130
6	S3.0	7	(United Kingdom) Border Reivers	(United Kingdom) Roy Salvadori (United Kingdom) Jim Clark	Aston Martin DBR1/300	1.128
7	GT3.0	16	(France) F. Tavano (private entrant)	(France) Fernand Tavano (France) “Loustel” (Pierre Dumay)	Ferrari 250 GT SWB	1.113
8	GT3.0	18	(United States) North American Racing Team	(United States) George Arents (United States) Alan Connell, Jr	Ferrari 250 GT SWB	1.106
9	GT3.0	22	(Belgium) Ecurie Francorchamps	(Belgium) “Eldé” (Leon Dernier) (Belgium) Pierre Noblet	Ferrari 250 GT SWB	1.105
10	GT3.0	19	(United States) North American Racing Team	(United States) Ed Hugus (United States) Augie Pabst	Ferrari 250 GT SWB	1.100

- Note: Only the top ten positions are included in this set of standings. A score of 1.00 means meeting the minimum distance for the car, and a higher score is exceeding the nominal target distance.

=== 26th Rudge-Whitworth Biennial Cup (1959/1960) ===
Pos	Class	No	Team	Drivers	Chassis	Score
1	S850	48	(France) Automobiles; Deutsch et Bonnet	(France) Gérard Laureau (France) Paul Armagnac	D.B. HBR-4 LM	1.257
	only 4 other cars eligible					

- Note: this was the final awarding of the Biennial Cup.

=== Statistics ===
Taken from Quentin Spurring's book, officially licensed by the ACO

- Fastest lap in practice – Dan Gurney, #6 Jaguar E2A – 4:04.5secs; 123.10 mph (198.11 km/h)
- Fastest lap – Masten Gregory, #24 Maserati T60/61 – 4:04.0secs; 198.60 km/h (123.40 mph)
- Distance – 4,217.53 km (2,620.65 mi)
- Winner's average speed – 175.72 km/h (109.19 mph)

=== FIA World Sportscar Championship ===
Pos	Championship	Points
1	(Italy) Ferrari	22 (30)
2	(West Germany) Porsche	22 (26)
3	(Italy) Maserati	11
4	(United Kingdom) Aston Martin	4

Championship points were awarded for the first six places in each race in the order of 8-6-4-3-2-1. Manufacturers were only awarded points for their highest finishing car with no points awarded for additional cars finishing. Only the best 4 results out of the 5 races would be included for the final score. Total points earned are shown within brackets.

Citations

World Sportscar Championship
Previous race: 1000km of Nürburgring	1960 season	Next race: 1961 12 Hours of Sebring

FIA GT Cup
Previous race: 6 Hours of Hockenheim	1960 season	Next race: GT Gran Premio di Monza
