= Triumph TR4 =

British drophead coupé automobile (1961–1965)

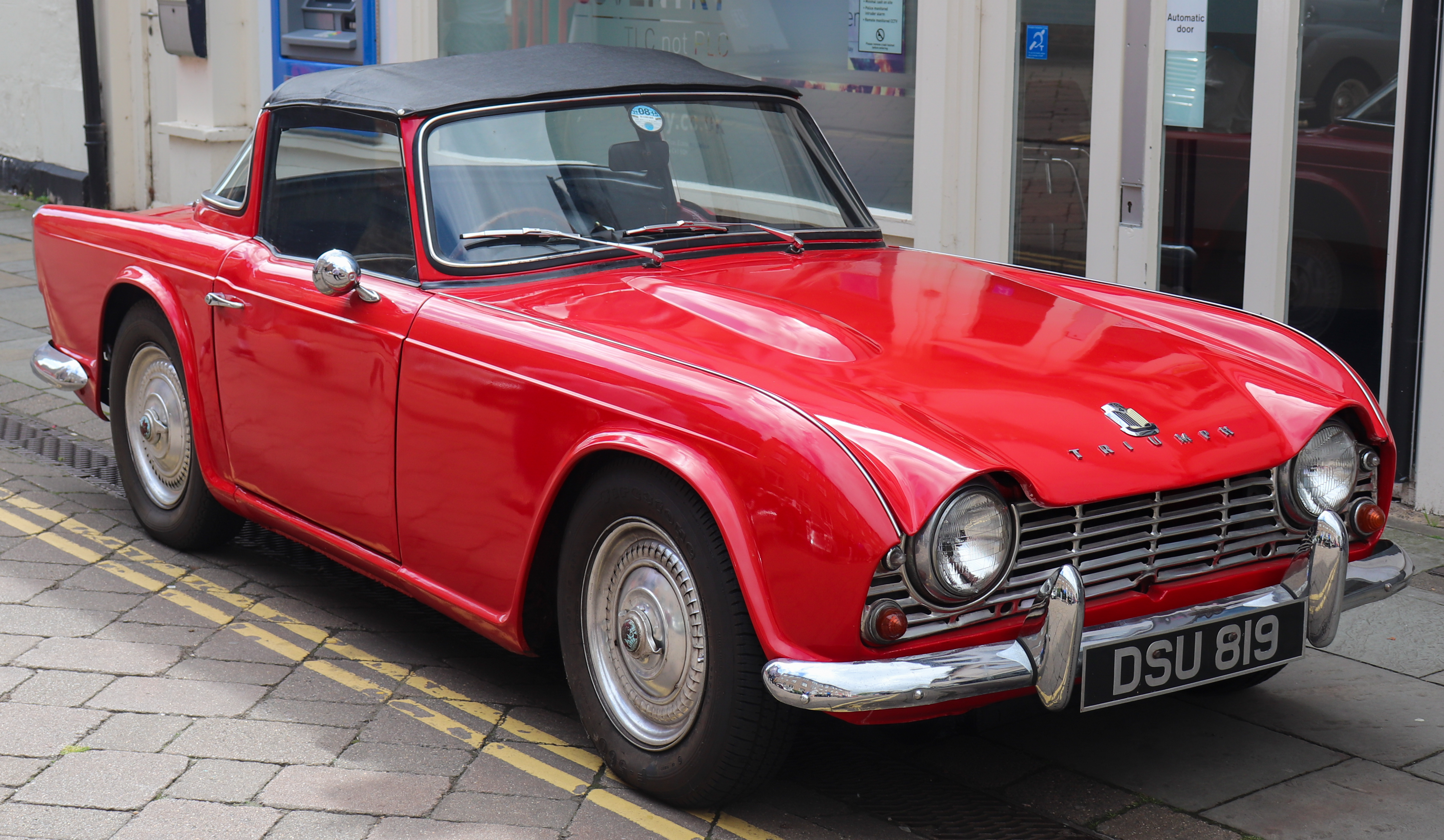

Overview
- Manufacturer: Triumph Motor Company
- Production: 18 July 1961 – 6 January 1965
- Assembly: United Kingdom: Canley, Coventry; Belgium: Mechelen, Antwerp; Italy: Borgo Panigale, Bologna (Ducati)
- Designer: Giovanni Michelotti

Body and chassis
- Class: Sports car
- Body style: 2-door Drophead coupé
- Layout: FR layout

Powertrain
- Engine: 2,138 cc (130.5 cu in) I4
- Transmission: 4-speed manual

Dimensions
- Wheelbase: 2,238 mm (88.1 in)
- Length: 3,962 mm (156.0 in)
- Width: 1,461 mm (57.5 in)
- Height: 1,270 mm (50.0 in)
- Kerb weight: 966 kg (2,130 lb)

Chronology
- Predecessor: Triumph TR3
- Successor: Triumph TR4A

The Triumph TR4 is a sports car produced by the Triumph Motor Company from 1961 to 1965. Successor to the TR3A, the TR4's chassis and drivetrain are closely related to those of its predecessor, but with an updated body designed by Michelotti.

== Development ==
Triumph began planning a successor to the TR3 as early as 1956. At the time, the company was facing a number of challenges. Lack of capital to fund development was partly relieved by the sale of Triumph's tractor division to Massey-Harris of Canada. A long overdue refresh of their small sedans was further complicated by the departure of chief stylist Walter Belgrove over a disagreement with the direction of the redesign.

After being introduced to Giovanni Michelotti, Triumph managing director Alick Dick invited the Italian designer to produce a concept car for the British company. Michelotti responded with the Triumph TR3 Speciale, also called the "TR Dream Car".

Built by Vignale on an unmodified TR3 chassis, Michelotti's TR Dream Car incorporated many styling cues from contemporary American practice, including tailfins, a full-width grille, lidded headlamps in the tops of the front wings, and a two-tone paint treatment. The TR3 Speciale debuted at the Geneva International Motor Show in March 1957. Triumph deemed the car too expensive to put into production, but did give the job of designing the new Triumph Herald to Michelotti.

Later in 1957 Standard-Triumph commissioned Michelotti to develop a serious proposal for a revised TR. A prototype, code-named Zest and built on a TR3A chassis, was complete by 1958. The Zest received a full-width body style, with headlamps that were inset from the sides and set high in the grille to stand above the bonnet, which was shaped into cowls over the lamps.

Around this time Triumph's Competitions department was working on a new high-performance engine with the development label 20X, later named Sabrina after contemporary British actress Norma Ann Sykes, the 20X is an inline four cylinder engine with dual overhead camshafts, and was expected to develop 160 hp (119 kW). To accommodate the engine, a chassis was created that widened the track by four inches and extended the wheelbase by six inches over those of the TR3.

In late 1958 Triumph commissioned Michelotti to create a body for the 20X development chassis. The new shape, named Zoom, was a full-width body, with tall doors having wind-down windows, and headlamps moved to the tops of the front wings. Two prototypes were complete by 1959; one convertible and one coupé with a removable roof panel.

The Zoom body was used for the three Triumph TRS race cars fielded at the 1960 24 Hours of Le Mans, which were powered by three 20X DOHC engines. The cars staged a formation finish, but were unclassified due to having failed to cover their mandatory distance. The cars were revised and entered again in the 1961 race, where they finished ninth, eleventh, and fifteenth overall, and claimed the manufacturer's team prize for Triumph.

By the middle of 1960, Triumph had two potential TR replacements — Zest and Zoom — with a combined program cost of £676,000. Originally, Zest had been conceived as the TR3's replacement, while Zoom was considered for production as an upmarket model. Having seen Zoom, some at Triumph wanted it to become the next TR, but the cost to produce a detuned 20X engine killed the project.

Ultimately management decided that neither Zest nor Zoom adequately addressed the target market, so the final design for the TR4 was based on Zest, but included some features from Zoom, including the wider track and hardtop option.

== Features ==
=== Body and chassis ===
The TR4's new body, produced in Triumph's Speke factory, does away with the cutaway door design and sloping boot lid of the previous TRs. The taller doors allow room for wind-down windows in place of the previous side-curtains, making the TR4 a true convertible. The taller, more squared-off rear body line encloses a capacious boot for a sports car.

The car's bonnet has a power bulge or "bubble" offset to one side to clear the engine's two carburettors. Early cars have a short bubble, while cars after CT 6429 have a longer bubble.

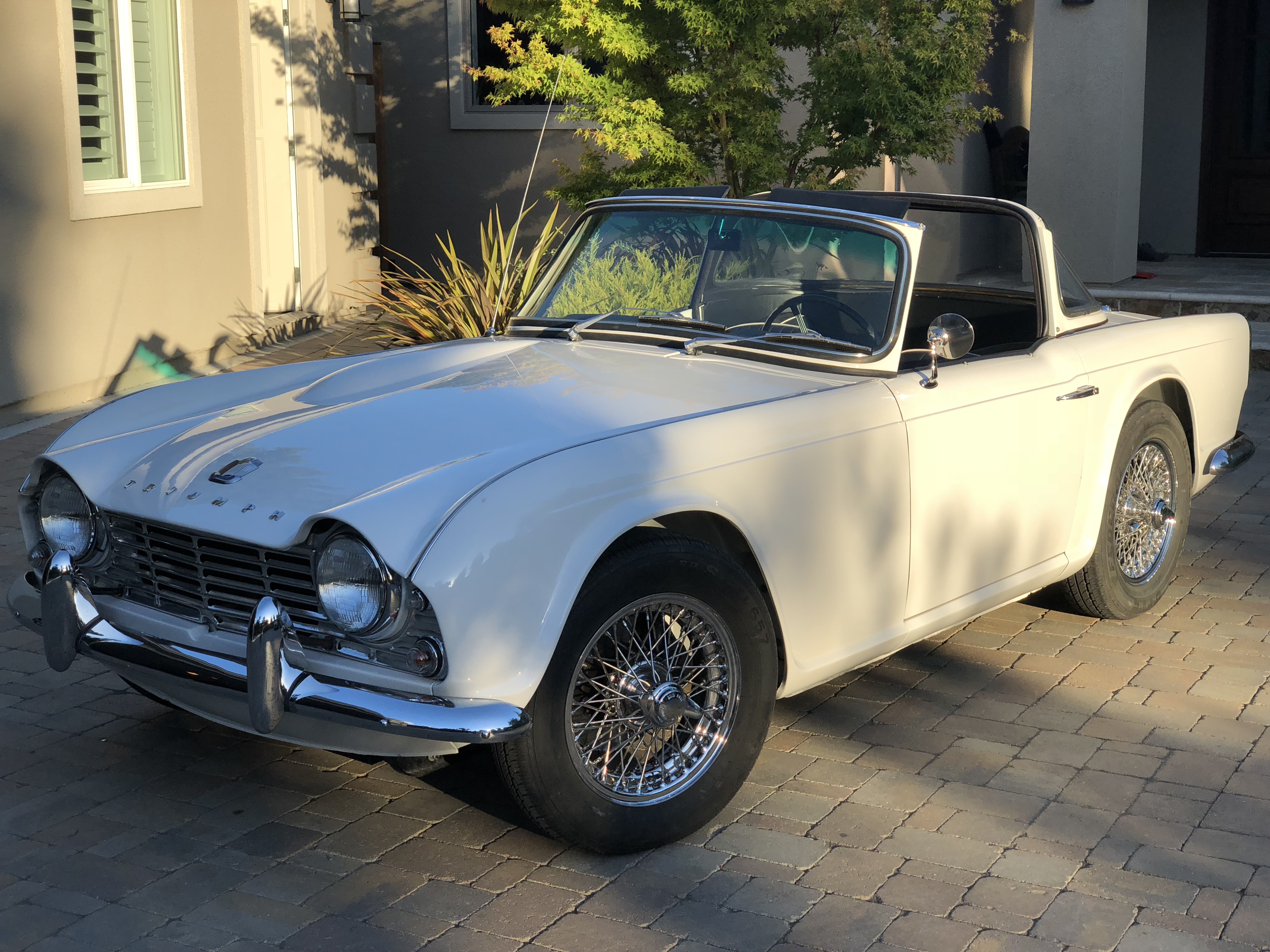
Hardtop with centre panel removed

The TR4 offered an optional hard top consisting of a fixed glass backlight with integral rollbar and a detachable centre panel made of aluminium on the first 500 units, and steel on subsequent cars. Featured on one of the Zoom prototypes, this was the first such roof system on a production car, predating the Porsche 911/912 Targa by five years.

On the TR4 the rigid roof panel could be replaced with a vinyl insert and supporting frame. While the rigid panel could not be stowed in the car, the vinyl insert and frame could be. The factory offered the rigid top and backlight assembly as the "Hard Top kit", and the vinyl insert and frame separately as the "Surrey top".

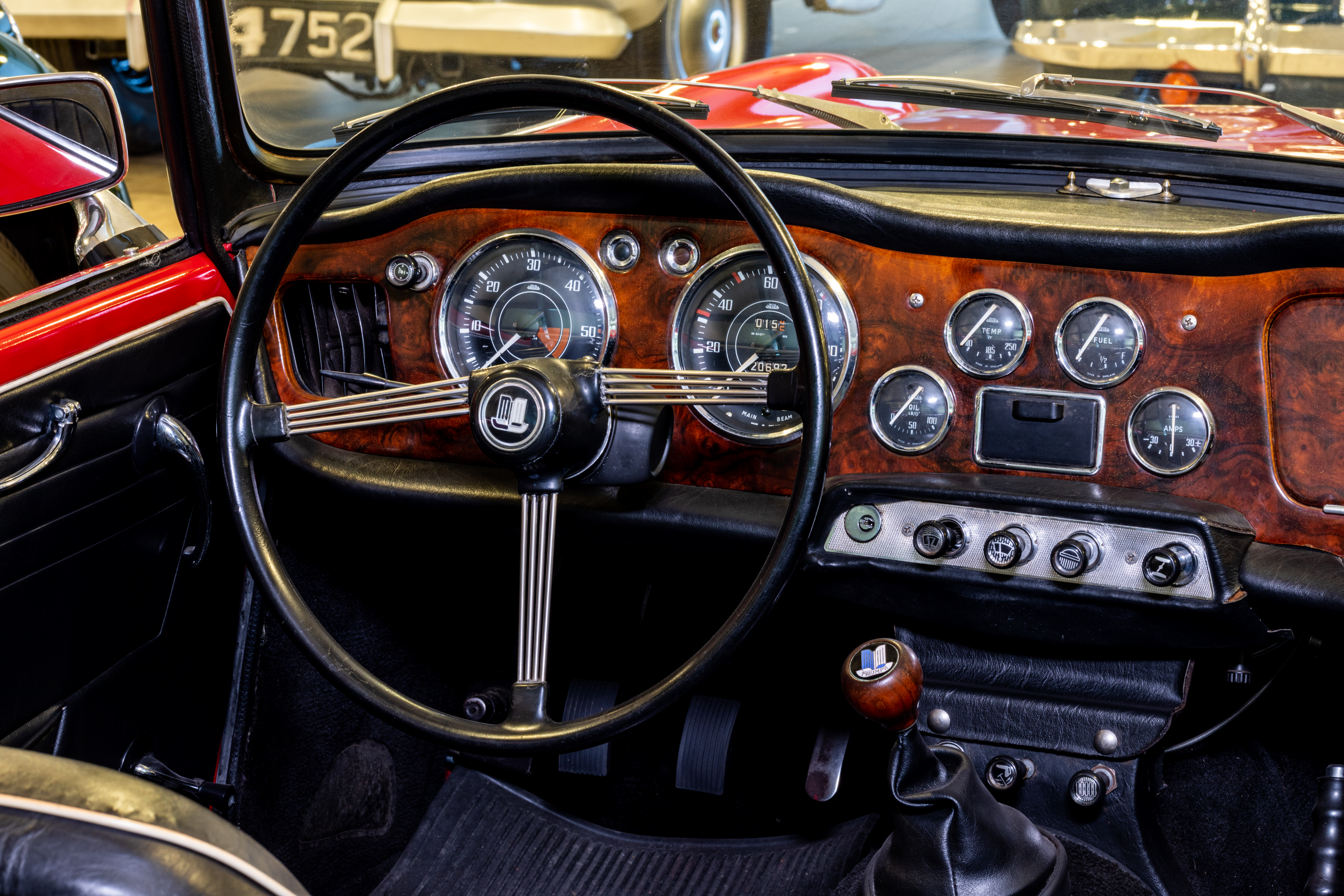
Fascia

The revised interior introduced adjustable fascia ventilation and a collapsible steering column. Features such as these were seen as necessary to keep pace with the competition, particularly in the important US market where the majority of TR4s were sold.

The TR4 uses essentially the same ladder chassis with central cruciform bracing as the TR3. At 88.1 in (2,238 mm), the TR4 has the same wheelbase as the earlier car, but its track widths are 4 in (102 mm) wider in front and 2.5 in (64 mm) wider in back than the earlier model.

=== Powertrain ===
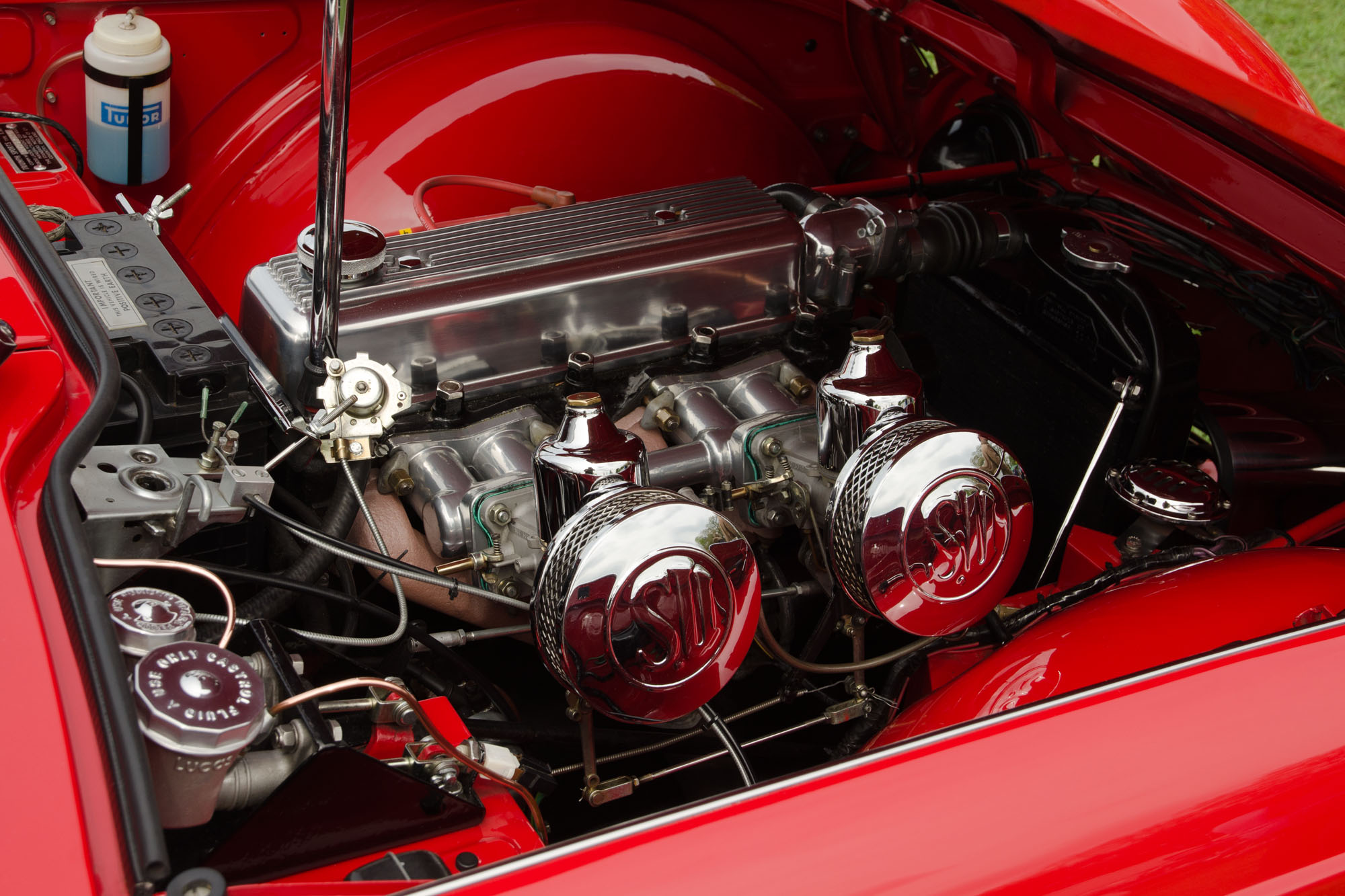
TR4 engine with SU carburettors

The TR4 uses the same Standard wet liner inline-four engine that powered the TR2 and TR3 models, but with displacement increased from 1991 cc to 2138 cc by enlarging the bore from 83 to 86 mm (3.268 to 3.386 in). The cast iron block carries the crankshaft in three main bearings, and the cast iron head has two valves per cylinder driven from a camshaft in the block via pushrods and rocker arms. The 1991 cc engine was a no-cost option for cars whose owners planned to race in the under-two-litre classes of the day. At different times the factory installed either a pair of SU H6 carburettors, or a pair of Zenith-Stromberg CD175s.

The car's four speed plus reverse manual transmission has synchromesh on all forward gears, an upgrade from the transmission in the TR3 which did not synchronize first gear. Additionally, the optional Laycock de Normanville electrically operated overdrive could be selected for second, third, and fourth gears, effectively providing the TR4 with a seven-speed close ratio gearbox.

=== Running gear ===
The TR4's front suspension consists of upper and lower wishbones, and telescopic dampers. Running changes to the car included a revised front suspension geometry, indicated by a smooth upper wishbone, and a revised front brake caliper and pad size.

The rear suspension includes a live axle with semi-elliptical springs, and lever-arm dampers.

The TR4 is fitted with rack and pinion steering, replacing the cam and lever system used on the earlier TR models.

The TR4 was originally fitted with 15x4.5" disc wheels. Optional 48-lace wire wheels could be ordered with one of three finishes: painted the same colour as the car's bodywork (rare), stove-enamelled (matte silver with chrome spinners, most common) or in matte or polished chrome finishes (originally rare, but now more common). Originally, the tyres most commonly fitted were 590-15 bias ply or optional radial tyres. At one point, American Racing alloy (magnesium and aluminium) wheels were offered in the US as an option, in 15x5.5" or 15x6" size.

== Production and sales ==
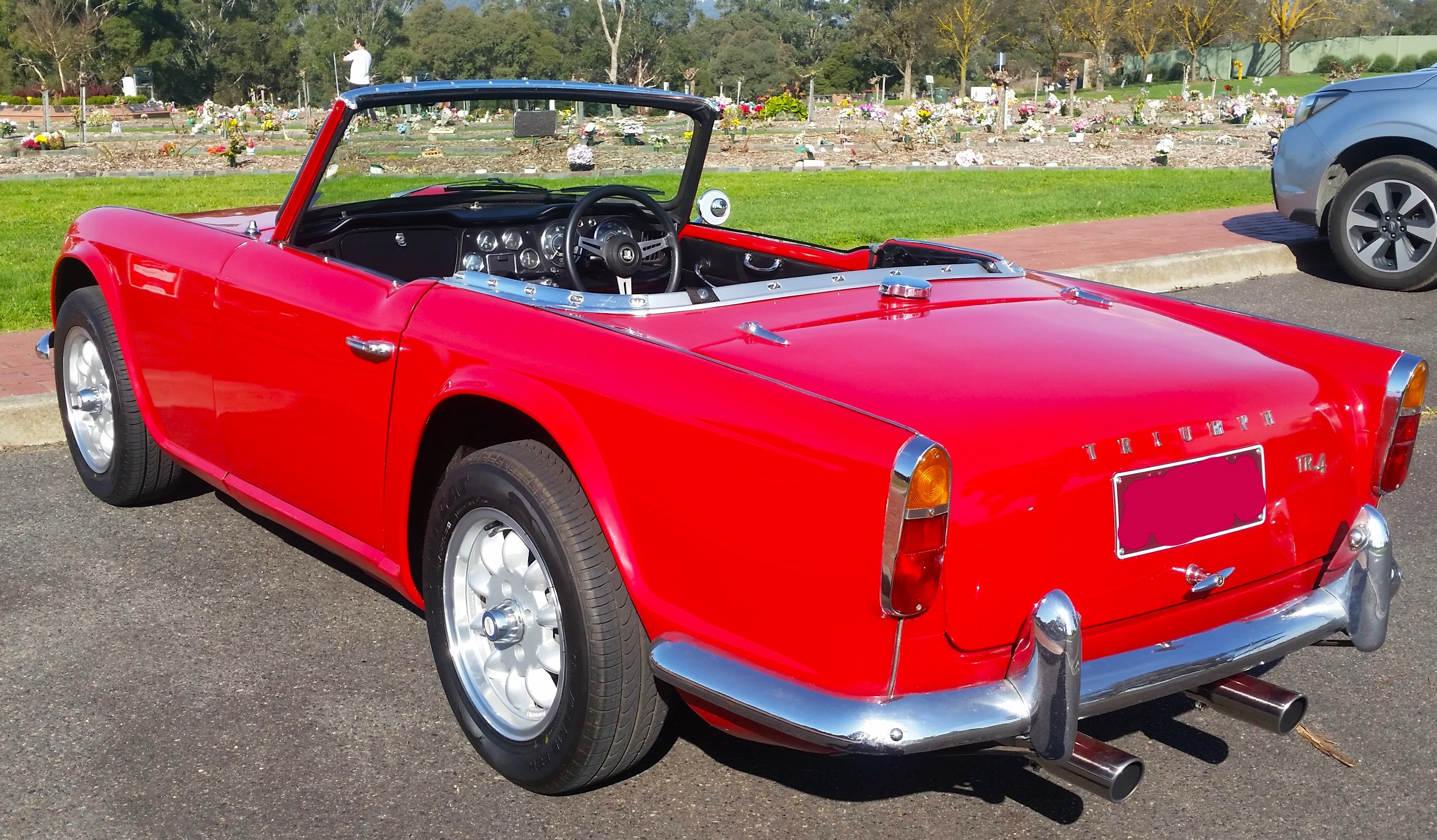
'Signal Red' was a popular color choice for the TR4

The first production TR4 was built on 18 July 1961, and received commission number CT1. The last car was built on 6 January 1965, with commission number CT40304. Final assembly of the cars was done at Triumph's Canley-Fletchamstead factory near Coventry. TR4s were also assembled from Complete Knock-Down (CKD) kits in Mechelen, Belgium and Borgo Panigale, Italy, the latter in a factory owned by Ducati.

American Triumph dealers were concerned that buyers might not accept the car's updated styling, so a brief special run of TR3s, commonly called TR3Bs, was produced for the US market in 1961 and '62. These cars have the body and chassis of the TR3A, but the 2138 cc engine and fully synchronised gearbox from the TR4.

A small number of TR4s were put to use as "Fast Pursuit Cars" by police departments in places such as Manchester City and the Southend-on-Sea Borough.

40,253 TR4s were built during its 3 and 1/2 year production run, of which 37,661 cars were sold in export markets (primarily the US), and only 2,592 cars sold domestically. In comparison, 8,635 TR2s were sold during its 3-year run from 1953–1955; 74,800 TR3s in an 8-year run from 1955 to 1962; 94,500 TR6s in a 9-year run from 1968–1976, and 111,500 TR7s over a 7-year run from 1975–1981.

As of Q2 2022 there were approximately 953 licensed and 216 SORN TR4s registered with the DVLA.

== Technical data ==
Triumph TR4	Detail:
Engine:	Standard wet liner inline-four engine
Bore × Stroke:	86 mm × 92 mm (3.386 in × 3.622 in)
Displacement:	2,138 cc (130.5 cu in)
Maximum power:	100 bhp (74.6 kW) at 4,600 rpm
Maximum torque:	127 ft⋅lb (172.2 N⋅m) at 3,350 rpm
Compression ratio:	9.0:1
Valvetrain:	Single cam-in-block, pushrods, rocker arms, 2 overhead valves per cylinder
Induction:	Two Stromberg 175CD carburettors or Two SU H6 carburettors
Cooling:	Water-cooled
Transmission:	4-speed manual with reverse (optional overdrive)
Final drive ratio:	3.7:1 (4.1:1 optional)
Steering:	Alford & Alder rack and pinion
Turns lock-to-lock:	2.5
Turning circle:	33 ft (10.1 m)
Brakes f/r:	Girling discs/drums
Suspension front:	Upper and lower wishbones, coil springs, telescopic dampers
Suspension rear:	Live axle, semi-elliptical springs, lever-arm dampers
Body/Chassis:	Steel body on steel ladder chassis
Track f/r:	49 / 48 in (1,245 / 1,219 mm) (disc wheels); 50 / 49 in (1,270 / 1,245 mm) (wire wheels)
Wheelbase:	88.1 in (2,238 mm)
Tyres:	5.5/5.90x15 / 165x15 (Michelin X)
Length; Width; Height:	156.0 in (3,962 mm); 57.5 in (1,461 mm); 50.0 in (1,270 mm)
Weight:	2,128 lb (965 kg)
Capacities: Fuel: Cooling: Sump: Transmission:	14 US gal (53.0 L; 11.7 imp gal); 16.8 US pt (7.9 L; 14.0 imp pt); 13.2 US pt (6.2 L; 11.0 imp pt); 1.8 US pt (0.9 L; 1.5 imp pt) (non-overdrive); 4.2 US pt (2.0 L; 3.5 imp pt) (overdrive)
Fuel consumption:	22.5 mpg_{‑imp} (12.6 L/100 km; 18.7 mpg_{‑US})
Maximum speed:	103 mph (166 km/h)

== Performance ==
Acceleration	Time
0–30 mph (0–48 km/h)	3.7 s
0–50 mph (0–80 km/h)	8.3 s
0–60 mph (0–97 km/h)	10.9 s
0–80 mph (0–129 km/h)	20.9 s
0–90 mph (0–145 km/h)	28.2 s
0–100 mph (0–161 km/h)	46.3 s

== Motorsports ==
The TR4 had a number of racing successes in America, primarily through the efforts of Californian engineer Kas Kastner and his top driver, Bob Tullius.

In 1961 the TR4 with commission number CT 7L, driven by George Waltman and Nick Cone, won first in class and thirtieth overall at Sebring. In 1962 the TR4 won the E production national championship, after which the SCCA reclassified the car to D production, which class Tullius won in 1963 and '64. Soon after the TR4 was introduced, Kastner and with Mike Cook from the advertising department at Triumph in New York City convinced the company to provide three new TR4s to race in the 12 Hours of Sebring in 1963. Preparation of the cars began in September 1962 in California, where Kastner was service supervisor for Triumph. The cars were then flown to Florida for the endurance race in March 1963. Driven by Mike Rothschild and Peter Bolton from England, Bob Tullius, Charlie Gates, Ed Deihl, Bob Cole, Bruce Kellner and Jim Spencer, the cars finished 22nd, 24th, and 35th overall of 65 entries, and first, second, and fourth in the 2.5 GT class. This was the genesis of the Triumph Competition Department led by Kastner for several years and used to publicize and market the TR4. The next year a privateer TR4 finished dead last in the 1964 running of the Sebring 12-hour race. Kastner returned to Sebring in 1966 with four carefully prepared TR4As, three of which finished winning the class. At Sebring in 1966, Tullius threw a piston in the most highly tuned car and did not finish. Perhaps the greatest racing victory for the TR4A was at Daytona, where a Kastner-prepared car driven by Charlie Gates won the 1965 SCCA D modified championship against Ferraris and other prepared race car exotica.

In 1964 the factory-sponsored Team Triumph entered three TR4s in the Canadian Shell 4000 rally. These "works" cars were reportedly built with gussets on the chassis members and aluminium body panels to strengthen and lighten the car. After import, the engines were prepared by Kastner in New York, where they were also fitted with lightweight magnesium wheels. Although they did not place well in the rally, the surviving cars have become quite valuable, one of which is owned by Neil Revington, the proprietor of Revington TR in the UK. Indeed, the TR4 became a celebrated rally car in Europe and the UK during early to mid-sixties, and various replicas are still campaigned by privateers in vintage rally events throughout Europe.

The TR4 continues to be raced in vintage sports car events, and even won an SCCA class championship as late as 1991. In Australia the TR4 was a common sight at hill-climb events and various club rallies and circuit racing events.

== TR4A ==
In 1965, the TR4A superseded the TR4. Although appearing nearly identical to the TR4, the TR4A was equipped with a significantly revised chassis, an independent rear suspension (IRS), and a wider front and rear track, as well as numerous changes to the exterior trim and interior fitments. An estimated 25% of TR4As sold in the US were not equipped with IRS but instead reverted to a live axle system similar to the TR4's on a slightly modified TR4A chassis.

== Dové GTR4 ==
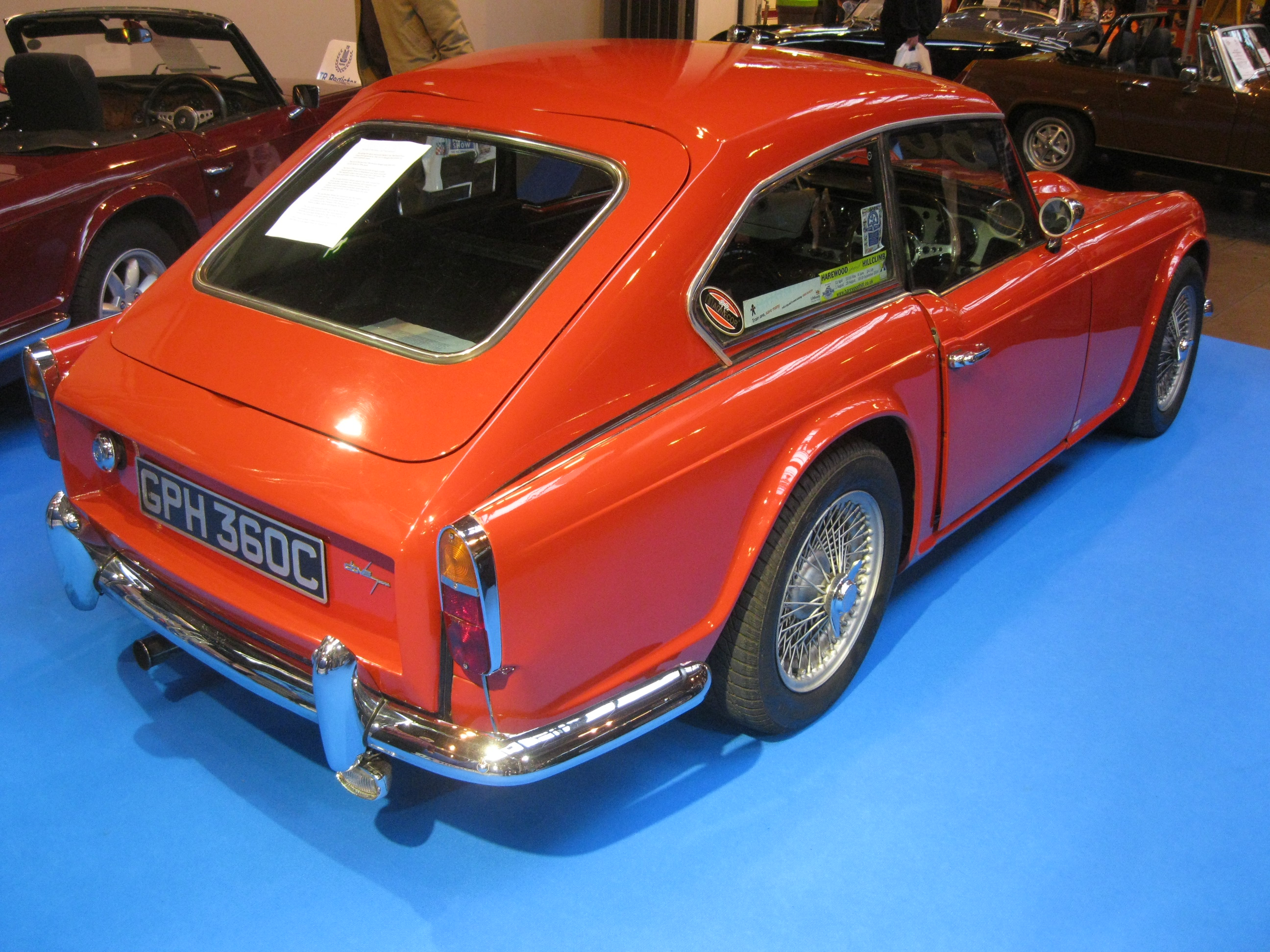
Dové GTR4 rear three-quarter view

A total of 43 Dové GTR4 and GTR4A fixed head coupés were produced at the direction of L. F. Dove Ltd., an auto dealership in Wimbledon, London. The conversions from standard TR4s were done by coachbuilder Harrington Motor Bodyworks, best known for building the Harrington Alpine, a similarly converted Sunbeam Alpine. Conceived as a more weather-proof alternative to the drophead coupé TR4, the Dové provided a way for Dove Ltd. to enter the market for GT automobiles. The company substituted an accented vowel at the end of the Dové name, although it is not typically pronounced.

The cars came with a heater in the engine's water jackets to assist cold starts. Tinted swing-down see-through acrylic sun visors were custom fitted. Two jump seats were located behind the driver's and passenger's seats, covered in material that matched the original TR4 upholstery. A wood-rimmed wheel with riveted perimeter was fitted to some models, along with auxiliary lamps under the front bumper bars. A metallised identifying sticker with "Dové" on it was fitted to the glovebox cover. On the left rear deck below the boot cover was another identifying badge with the Dové logo. The side window glasses were specially shaped, with a flat top edge to fit the new roof line. Some were fitted with a fully balanced motor built by either Jack Brabham Motors or Laystall Engineering in London, which was offered as an option in the sales catalogue. Each Dové was an individual order, with some variations between each car. The cars were priced at an expensive £1250. Although most Dovés were based on the TR4 model, some brochures include pictures of a TR4A-based version.

The aerodynamics of the Dové gave it good acceleration from 80 to 100 mph (130 to 160 km/h) in comparison with the TR4 drophead coupé. One example was exported for sale through Australian Motor Industries in Melbourne, Australia. A road test of one of these cars was reported in Autocar magazine dated 7 June 1963, and in Autosport magazine on 12 July 1963. Up to a dozen of the cars are known to still exist.
