= Antonio Fassina =

Italian rally driver (born 1945)

Antonio "Tony" Fassina
Personal information
- Nationality: (Italy) Italian
- Born: 26 June 1945 (age 81)

World Rally Championship record
- Years active: 1976–1981
- Co-driver: (Italy) Mauro Mannini (Italy) "Rudy"
- Teams: Lancia, Opel
- Rallies: 5
- Championships: 0
- Rally wins: 1
- Podiums: 3
- Stage wins: 28
- Total points: 32
- First rally: 1976 Rallye Sanremo
- First win: 1979 Rallye Sanremo
- Last rally: 1981 Rallye Sanremo

Antonio "Tony" Fassina (born 26 July 1945) is a former rally driver from Italy. He won the Italian Rally Championship in 1976 and 1979 driving a Lancia Stratos HF, and then again in 1981 behind the wheel of an Opel Ascona 400 prepared by Virgilio Conrero. In 1982, he drove the Ascona to victory in the European Rally Championship. He also competed with success in the Italian round of the World Rally Championship, Rallye Sanremo, scoring four top five results between 1976 and 1981, including outright victory in the 1979 event ahead of Walter Röhrl.

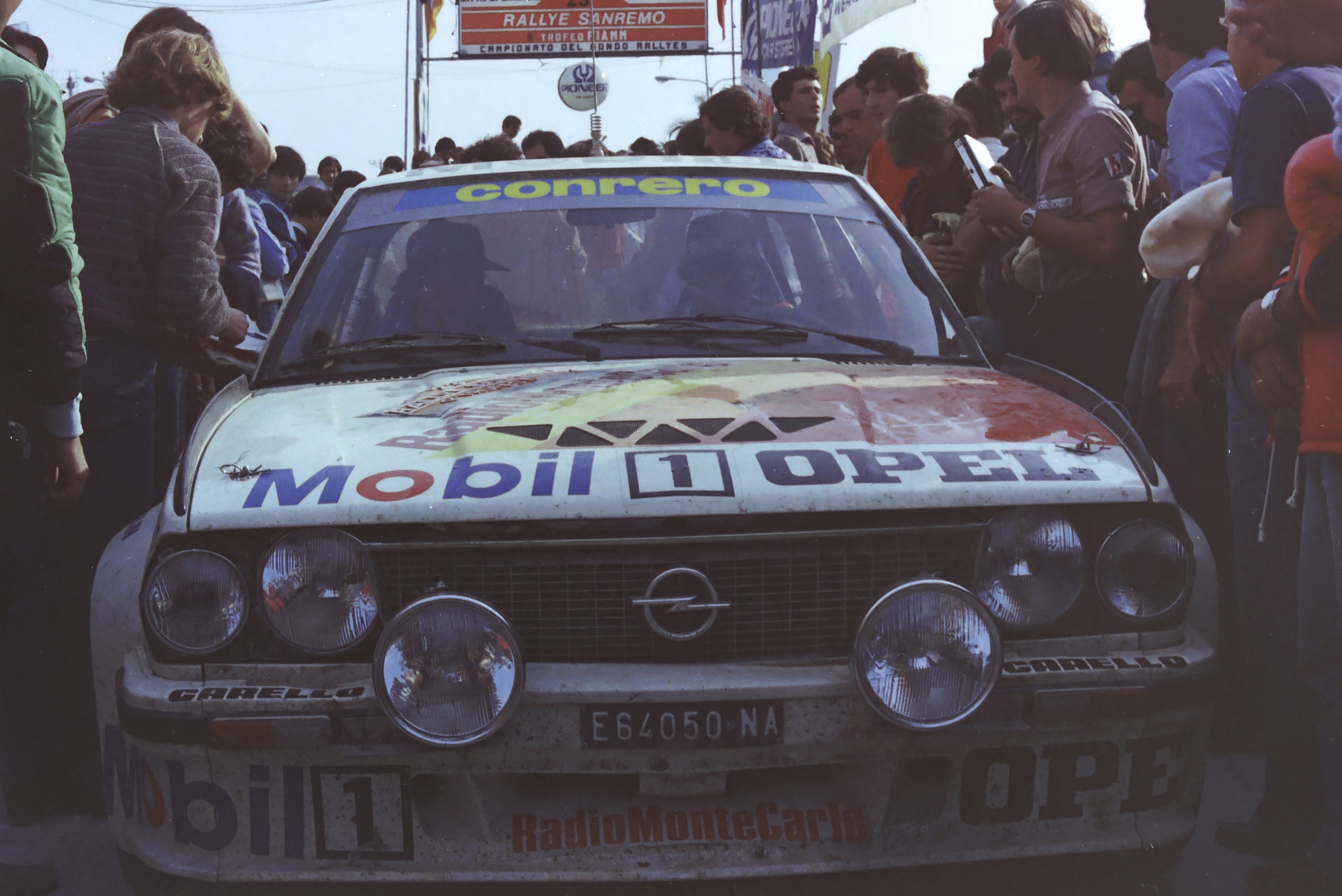
Conrero-Opel Ascona 400 of "Tony"/"Rudy" at the 1981 Rallye Sanremo

He now runs Gruppo Fassina S.p.A. (Fassina Group), the business group he established in 1982 as a Milanese car dealership as he approached retirement from racing.

== WRC victories ==
#	Event	Season	Co-driver	Car
1	(Italy) 21º Rallye Sanremo	1979	Mauro Mannini	Lancia Stratos HF

== Racing record ==
=== Complete WRC results ===
Year	Entrant	Car	1	2	3	4	5	6	7	8	9	10	11	12	WDC	Pts
1976	Scuderia Grifone	Lancia Stratos HF	MON	SWE	POR	KEN	GRC	MOR	FIN	ITA; 4	FRA	GBR; Ret			N/A	N/A
1977	Jolly Club	Fiat 131 Abarth	MON	SWE	POR	KEN	NZL	GRC	FIN	CAN	ITA; 3	FRA	GBR		N/A	N/A
1979	Jolly Club	Lancia Stratos HF	MON	SWE	POR	KEN	GRE	NZL	FIN	CAN	ITA; 1	FRA	GBR	CIV	10th	20
1980	Conrero Squadra Corse	Opel Ascona 400	MON	SWE	POR	KEN	GRC	ARG	FIN	NZL	ITA; Ret	FRA	GBR	CIV	NC	0
1981	Conrero Squadra Corse	Opel Ascona 400	MON	SWE	POR	KEN	FRA	GRC	ARG	BRA	FIN	ITA; 3	CIV	GBR	20th	12

Sporting positions
Preceded by Roberto Cambiaghi	Italian Rally Champion; 1976	Succeeded by Mauro Pregliasco
Preceded by Adartico Vudafieri	Italian Rally Champion; 1979	Succeeded by Adartico Vudafieri
Preceded by Adartico Vudafieri	Italian Rally Champion; 1981	Succeeded by Antonio Tognana
Preceded by Adartico Vudafieri	European Rally Champion; 1982	Succeeded by Miki Biasion
