= Triumph TR3 =

British sports car produced between 1955 and 1962

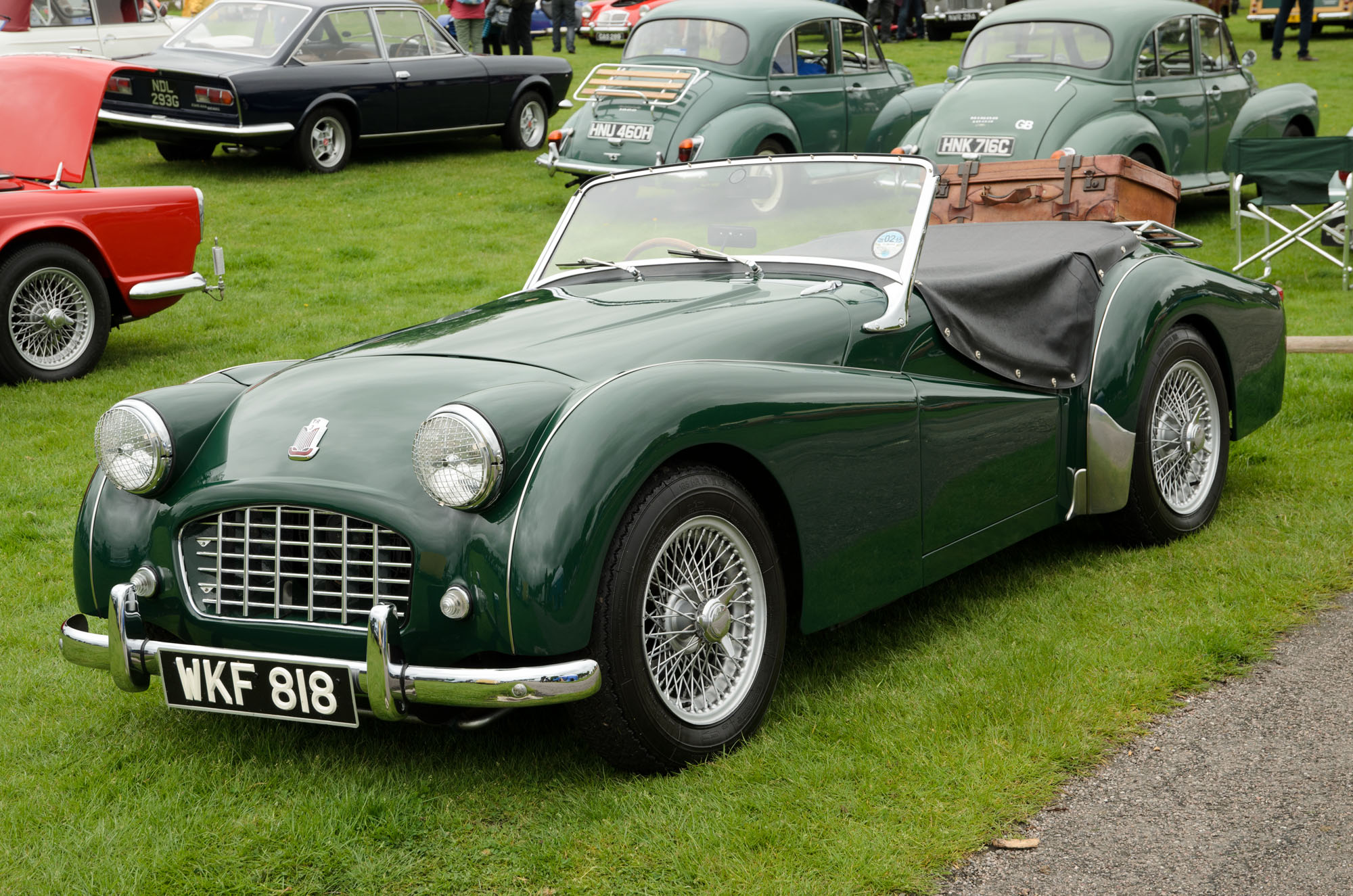
- 1957 Triumph TR3

Overview
- Manufacturer: Standard Motor Company
- Production: 1955–1962
- Assembly: United Kingdom: Coventry; Australia: Port Melbourne (AMI); Belgium: Liège; Belgium: Mechelen; South Africa: Durban (Motor Assemblies)

Body and chassis
- Class: Sports car
- Layout: FR layout

Powertrain
- Engine: 1,991 cc (121.5 cu in) I4 (TR3, TR3A); 2,138 cc (130.5 cu in) I4 (TR3B)
- Transmission: 4-speed manual with optional overdrive

Dimensions
- Wheelbase: 88 in (2,235 mm)
- Length: 151 in (3,835 mm)
- Width: 56 in (1,422 mm)
- Height: 50 in (1,270 mm)
- Kerb weight: 955 kg (2,105 lb)

Chronology
- Predecessor: Triumph TR2
- Successor: Triumph TR4

The Triumph TR3 is a British sports car produced from 1955 to 1962 by the Standard Motor Company of Coventry, England. A traditional open two-seater, the TR3 is an evolution of the company's earlier TR2 model, with greater power and improved braking. Updated variants, popularly but unofficially known as the "TR3A" and "TR3B", entered production in 1957 and 1962 respectively. The TR3 was succeeded by the mechanically similar, Michelotti-styled Triumph TR4.

The rugged ‘sidescreen’ TR, so named for its use of removable plexiglass side curtains, was a sales and motorsport success. With approximately 74,800 TR3s sold across all variants, the model was the company's third best seller in the TR range, behind the TR7 (111,500 units) and TR6 (94,500 units) models.

== TR3 (1955–1957) ==
Although the base car is an open two-seater, an occasional rear seat and bolt-on steel hard top were available as extras.

The TR3 is powered by a 1,991 cc (121.5 cu in) Standard wet liner engine. This OHV straight-four initially produced 95 bhp (71 kW; 96 PS), an increase of 5 hp over the TR2 thanks to larger SU H6 carburettors. This was later increased to 100 bhp at 5000 rpm by the addition of a "high port" cylinder head and enlarged manifold. The four-speed manual gearbox could be supplemented by an electrically engaged overdrive, controlled by a switch on the dashboard. In 1956, the front brakes were changed from drums to discs, a first for a British series production car.

Front suspension is by double wishbones, manganese bronze trunnions, coil springs and telescopic dampers, with an optional anti-roll bar.

Steering is a worm and peg system. Unlike MGs of the same period, the steering mechanism and linkage have considerable play and friction, which increase with wear.

The rear suspension comprises leaf springs, a beam axle, and lever arm dampers. The (box) frame rails are slung under the axle. Wheels are 15 inches in diameter and 4.5 inches wide (increased from 4 inches after the first few TR2s), with 48-spoke wire wheels optional. Wire wheels were usually painted, either body colour or argent (silver), but matte chrome and bright chrome were also available.

Under most conditions the car is responsive and forgiving, but it has some handling issues. The chassis, which is shared by the TR2, TR3, TR3A, TR3B, and TR4, has limited wheel travel. As a result, on very hard cornering, the inside rear wheel can lift, causing sudden oversteer due to the increased load on the outside rear tyre. This is particularly true with radial tyres; the original TR2/3/3A suspension was built for crossply tyres. The wheel lifting is more sudden than that of other cars, because it is caused by coming to the end of the suspension travel while there is still load on the tyre, so the load on the other (outside) rear wheel is a discontinuous function of cornering load, rather than just changing slope.

The TR3 is designed for sunny weather, but with removable rain protection. It has a convertible hood that snaps on and off and removable side curtains, allowing very low doors with padding for the driver's arm to rest on. There are holes in the floor, with rubber plugs, so that the originally supplied jack might be used from inside the car, as in the Jaguar XK120. The optional heater is poor, and the shut-off valve is under the bonnet.

Some 13,377 examples of the original "pre-facelift" TR3 were produced, of which 1,286 were sold within the UK; the rest were exported, mainly to the United States. As of Q1 2011 there were approximately 826 licensed and 115 SORN TR3/3As registered with the DVLA.

=== Specifications ===
- Production period – October 1955 to Summer 1957
- Original price (basic model) – £950
- Suspension – Front: independent by unequal-length double wishbones, coil springs and telescopic dampers. Rear: live axle, half-elliptic springs, lever arm dampers.
- Brakes – First 4408 models (1955–56): 10-inch (254 mm) drums all around. Remaining 9000 (1956–57): front discs; rear drums.
- Factory options – Triumph offered a wide range of options and accessories for both the competition-minded owner and those simply wishing to personalise their vehicle. While many of these items were factory fitments, local dealers supplied some as well. Among these were: overdrive, 48-spoke wire wheels, steel hardtop kit (part No. 900711), occasional rear seat (No. 801264), push-button radio, interior heater, leather upholstery, windscreen washer (No. 553729), cast aluminium sump (No. 502126), aluminium ‘Al-fin’ brake drums (No. 202267 or No. 301590 (9- and 10-inch respectively)), spot and fog lamps (Nos. 501703, 501702), and a continental touring kit (No. 502022, spares for travels in remote regions).

=== Performance ===
British auto magazine The Motor tested a hardtop TR3 with overdrive in 1956. The car returned a top speed of 105.3 mph (169.5 km/h) and could accelerate from 0–60 mph (97 km/h) in 10.8 seconds. A fuel consumption of 27.1 miles per imperial gallon (10.4 L/100 km; 22.6 mpg_{‑US}) was recorded. The test car cost £1,103 including taxes.

Other figures recorded included:

Speed	Time
0–30 mph (48 km/h)	3.6 s
0–50 mph (80 km/h)	7.5 s
0–60 mph (97 km/h)	10.8 s
0–90 mph (140 km/h)	28.8 s
Distance	Time
Standing 1/4 mile	18.1 s

== TR3A (1957–1962) ==
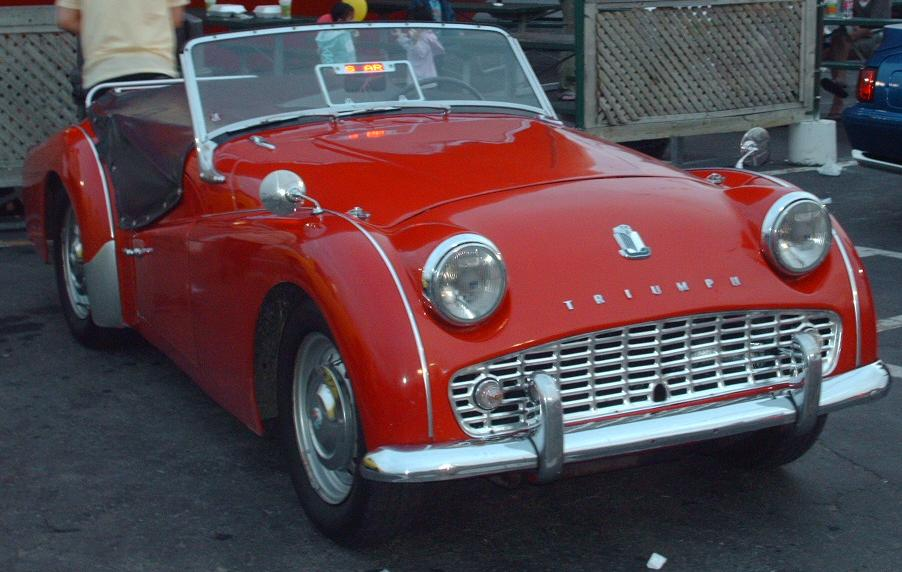
Triumph "TR3A"

In 1957 the TR3 was updated, and this revised model was commonly referred to as the Triumph "TR3A". The cars were still badged as TR3s, and the "TR3A" name was not used officially, as is evident from contemporary sales brochures. Changes included a new full-width front grille, exterior door handles, and a lockable boot handle. The previously optional full tool kit became standard equipment. The "TR3A" carried over the standard front disc brakes introduced on later TR3s. The car was known for its superior braking ability, making it an autocross favourite.

In 1959 other changes were made to the car, including raised stampings under the bonnet and boot hinges and under the door handles, as well as a redesigned rear floor section. In addition, the windscreen was attached with bolts rather than the Dzus fasteners used on the early "A" models. This year new options included a 2138 cc engine, and 60-spoke wire wheels.

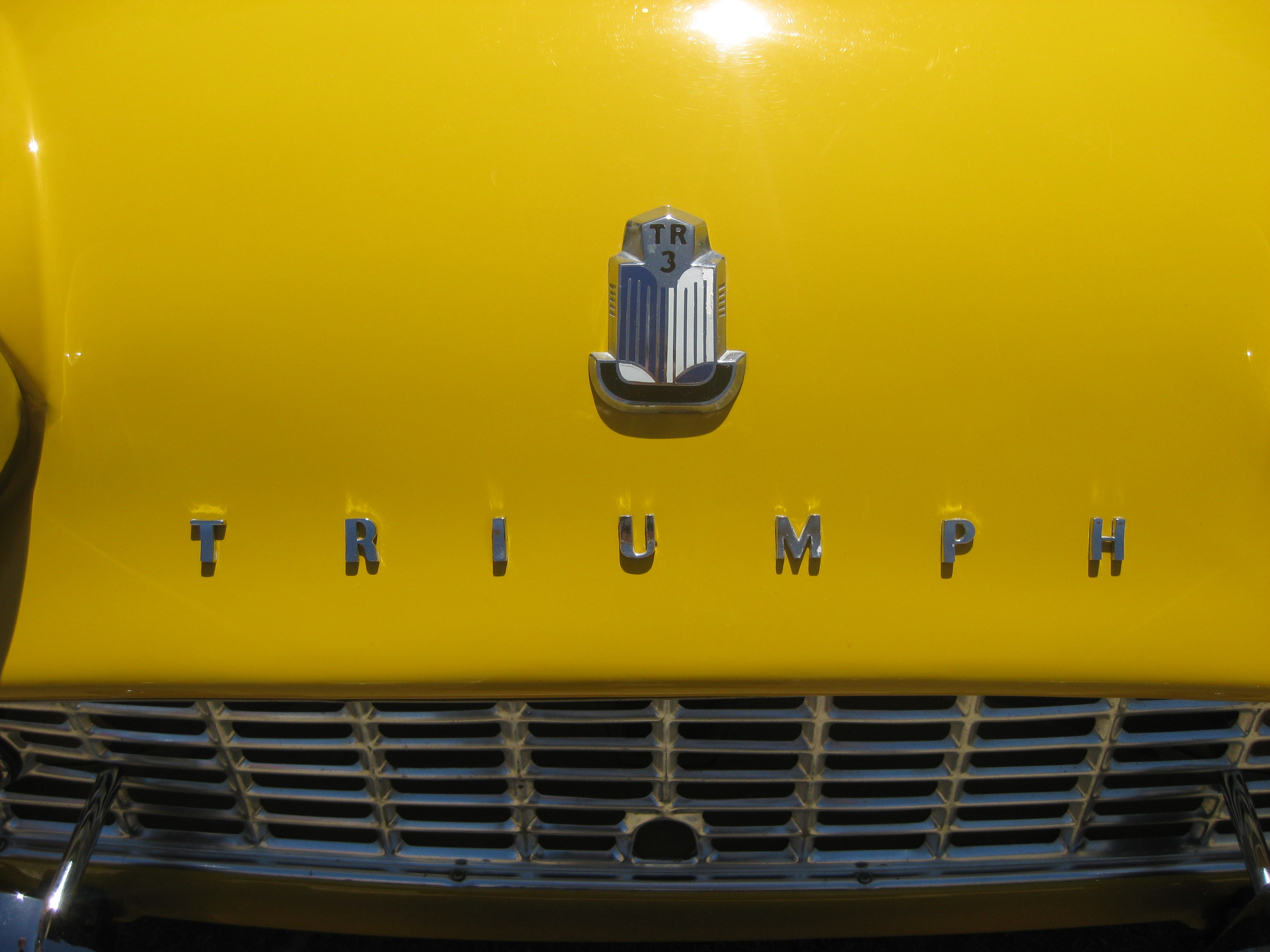
Although the facelifted TR3 is often referred to as the TR3A, it is badged as "Triumph TR3"

The "TR3A" was built between 1957 and 1962. Total production was 58,236 cars, making it the third best-selling TR in its own right. The TR3A was so successful that the original panel press tooling wore out and had to be replaced. It is estimated that only 9,500 of the original 58,000 built survive today.

The "TR3A" is often seen in vintage and production racing today. Despite being over 50 years old, it is still competitive in Sports Car Club of America (SCCA) E-production class.

In June 1977, Road & Track magazine published an article titled "Driving Impressions: TR3A & TR250" in its 30th anniversary issue. For the "TR3A" it reported a 0–60 mph (97 km/h) time of 12.0 seconds, power output of 100 bhp (75 kW) at 4800 rpm, observed kerb weight of 2,090 lb (950 kg) and fuel consumption of 28 miles per imperial gallon (10 L/100 km; 23 mpg_{‑US}).

== TR3B (1962) ==
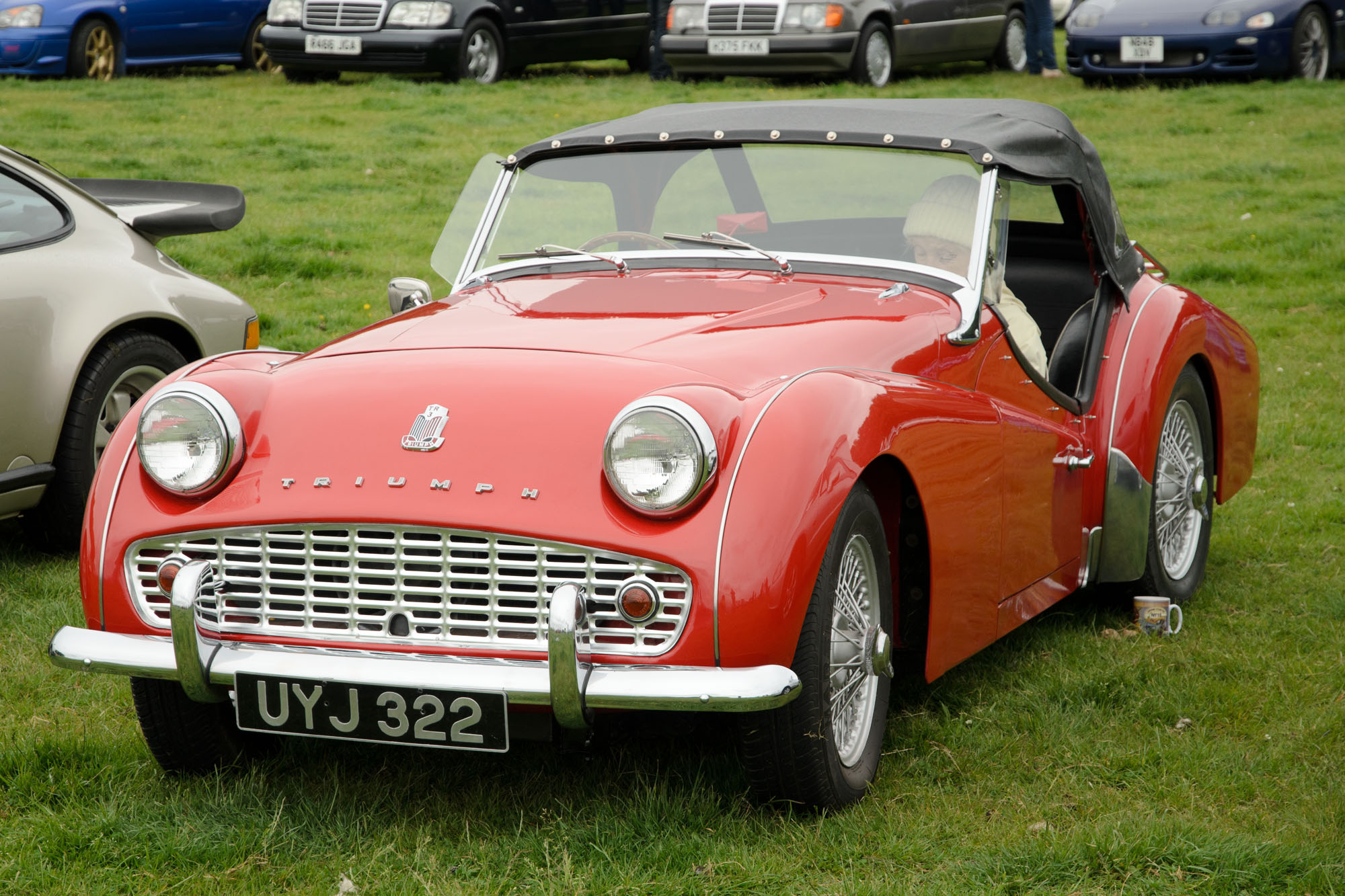
Triumph "TR3B"

"TR3B" is the unofficial name given to the final version of the Triumph TR3, which was produced in 1962. It was sold concurrently with the TR4, which started production in 1961. The "TR3B" was a special short-production run in response to dealer concerns that the buying public might not welcome the TR4.

The appearance of most "TR3B"s is identical to that of the late US-model "TR3A", with the same wider headlamp rims, wider grille, and door handles. Two series of this version were made. 530 cars with a commission number preceded by TSF were produced, 29 of which were built as Triumph Italias. 2,804 cars were produced with commission numbers preceded by TCF. Both series were partly produced in parallel. The TSF cars, like the last run of TR3As, have a 1991 cc engine and a transmission with no synchroniser on first gear. The TCF series has a fully synchronised transmission and a 2138 cc version of the Standard wet-liner engine with a 9:1 compression ratio. Fitted with two SU H6 carburettors, it makes 105 hp (78 kW) at 4,650 rpm and 172 N⋅m (127 lbf⋅ft) of torque at 3,350 rpm. It gets between 20 and 30 miles per US gallon (11.8 and 7.8 L/100 km; 24 and 36 mpg_{‑imp}). Top speed is limited to about 110 mph (177 km/h) by the gear ratio, unless fitted with an overdrive unit. An electrically operated Laycock de Normanville Type A overdrive, operating on second, third, and fourth gears, was offered as an option. The car weighs 2,137 lb (969 kg).

== Technical data ==
Characteristics	TR3	"TR3A"	"TR3B"
Years	October 1955 – Summer 1957	1957–1962	1962
Engine	Standard wet liner inline-four engine		
Bore × Stroke	83 mm × 92 mm (3.27 in × 3.62 in)		86 mm × 92 mm (3.39 in × 3.62 in)
Displacement	1,991 cc (121.5 cu in)		2,138 cc (130.5 cu in)
Compression	8.5:1		9.0:1
Max. power	95 hp (71 kW) at 4600 rpm (early); 100 hp (75 kW) (late)	100 hp (75 kW)	105 hp (78 kW)
Max. torque	159 N⋅m (117 lb⋅ft) at 3000 rpm	n/a	n/a
Valvetrain	Chain-driven cam-in-block, pushrods and rocker arms, 2 overhead valves per cylinder		
Cooling	Water cooling		
Induction	2 side-draught SU H6 carburettors		
Gearbox	4-speed manual, unsynchronised first gear. Optional overdrive		4-speed manual, fully synchronised. Optional overdrive
Front suspension	Upper and lower wishbones, coil springs, telescopic dampers, anti-roll bar		
Rear suspension	Beam axle on semi-elliptic leaf springs, lever-arm dampers		
Body and chassis	Steel body on separate steel ladder chassis with cruciform bracing		
Steering	Bishop cam		
Front brakes	10 in (250 mm) Lockheed drums (early); Girling discs (late)	Disc brakes, Girling calipers	
Rear brakes	10 in (250 mm) Lockheed drums	10 in (250 mm) Lockheed drums (early); 9 in (230 mm) Girling drums (late)	9 in (230 mm) Girling drums
Wheelbase	88 in (2,235 mm)		
Track front/rear	45 / 45 1/2 in (1,143 / 1,156 mm)		
Tyres front/rear	5.50-15/5.50-15		
Length	149 in (3,785 mm)	151 in (3,835 mm)	
Width	55 1/2 in (1,410 mm)		
Height	50 in (1,270 mm)		
Kerb weight	19 long cwt 2 qr (2,180 lb or 990 kg)	2,090 lb (948 kg)	2,137 lb (969 kg)
Top speed	103 mph (166 km/h)	105 mph (169 km/h)	108 mph (174 km/h)

== Prototypes, Specials, and others ==
=== TR3 Speciale ===
After being introduced to Giovanni Michelotti, Triumph managing director Alick Dick invited the Italian designer to produce a concept car for the British company. Michelotti responded with the Triumph TR3 Speciale, also called the "TR Dream Car".

Built by Vignale on an unmodified TR3 chassis, Michelotti's TR Dream Car incorporated many styling cues from contemporary American practice, including tailfins, a full-width grille, lidded headlamps in the tops of the front wings, and a two-tone paint treatment. The TR3 Speciale debuted at the Geneva International Motor Show in March 1957. Triumph deemed the car too expensive to put into production, but did give the job of designing the new Triumph Herald to Michelotti.

=== TR3 Beta ===
The TR3 Beta is a prototype of a modified version of the TR3 with wider than standard front and rear tracks, revised mechanicals, and modified bodywork with wider front and rear wings. The project is mentioned several times in the minutes of the meeting of the Standard-Triumph board on 19 September 1960.

Different reasons have been mooted to explain why Triumph created the TR3 Beta. One holds that the Beta predated production of the TR4 chassis, and was solely an attempt to improve the handling of the TR3, with the TR4 a beneficiary of the work done on the Beta. Another points out that work on the TR4 was already underway by 1960, when the Beta project was being discussed. Yet another suggests that the Beta project was begun because Triumph lacked the financial resources needed to tool up to produce the new TR4 body.

The team that produced the Beta was headed by Ray Bates. Work started on the car at Triumph's Capmartin Road (a.k.a. Radford) plant, and was later transferred back to their Fletchamstead North site. Team member Ray Henderson took chassis X693, cut it in half lengthwise, and widened the chassis. Bates then engineered changes to allow the wider chassis to be built with existing tooling.

The car was designated as a TR3B, and just two examples were built; the Black Beta and the Red Beta.

In addition to its wider chassis and modified bodywork, the TR3 Beta shared its fully synchronised gearbox, rack-and-pinion steering, and larger engine with the TR4. By late in the project the Beta had also received a new grille and grille surround, wrap around rear bumpers, and tall stone guards. Use of the Triumph Sabrina engine had been considered for the car.

After becoming part of Leyland Motors, the TR4 body shell tooling was funded by the new parent company. Work on the Beta was stopped.

As of this writing, one of the Beta prototypes is owned by Neil Revington, and is undergoing a restoration.

== Motorsports ==
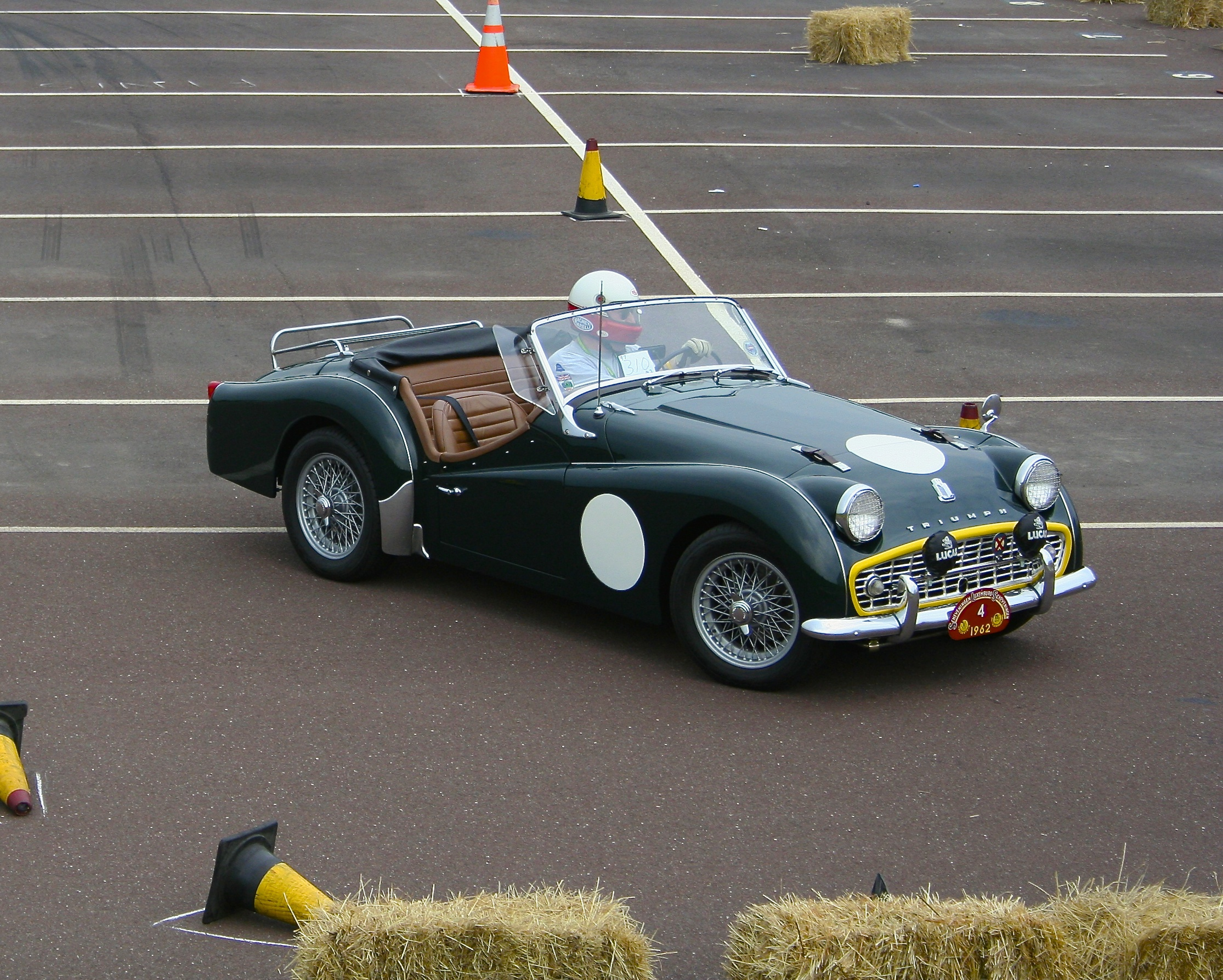
1960 Triumph TR3 in pit lane

The TR3 was campaigned in races, hill climbs, and rallies across Europe and North America, with several outright, team, and class victories to its credit.

After the 1955 Le Mans disaster, the French government moved to restrict motorsports to road rallying, then little more than long distance road racing. In response, Triumph competition manager Ken Richardson had steel hard tops bolted to 100 TR3s, homologating the new sports car as a "grand touring" coupé, the GT class still permitted to race on French public roadways. A 'grand touring kit' was made available to customers as an optional extra (part No. 554313).

TR3s were campaigned in the RAC, Monte Carlo, Circuit of Ireland, Alpine, Liege-Rome-Liege, International Tulip, Scheveningen-Luxembourg, Tour de France, Douze Heures de Huy, Lyon-Charbonnieres, Acropolis, Chimay National, and Corsica rallies, among others, achieving numerous outright, team, and class victories including six "Coupes des Alpes" awards. With its robust engine and rugged reliability, the TR was a popular competitor in continental hill climbs, such as the Ollon Villars and Eberbach Bergrennen, and endurance races like the 12 Hours of Sebring and the Mille Miglia.

At the 1959 24 Hours of Le Mans, three extensively modified TR3s, referred to as 'TR3S' models, were run. Resembling the production TR3, the Le Mans cars employed glass fibre body shells, were six inches longer than the production vehicle, and were powered by the prototype 1,985 cc (121.1 cu in) Triumph Sabrina engine. The Jopp/Stoop TR3S ran as high as seventh place overall before being forced to retire due to mechanical difficulties with just over an hour remaining in the race.
