= Virgilio Conrero =

- Born: January 1, 1918; Turin, Italy
- Died: January 6, 1990 (aged 72); Turin, Italy
- Occupations: Automotive engineer, racing team manager

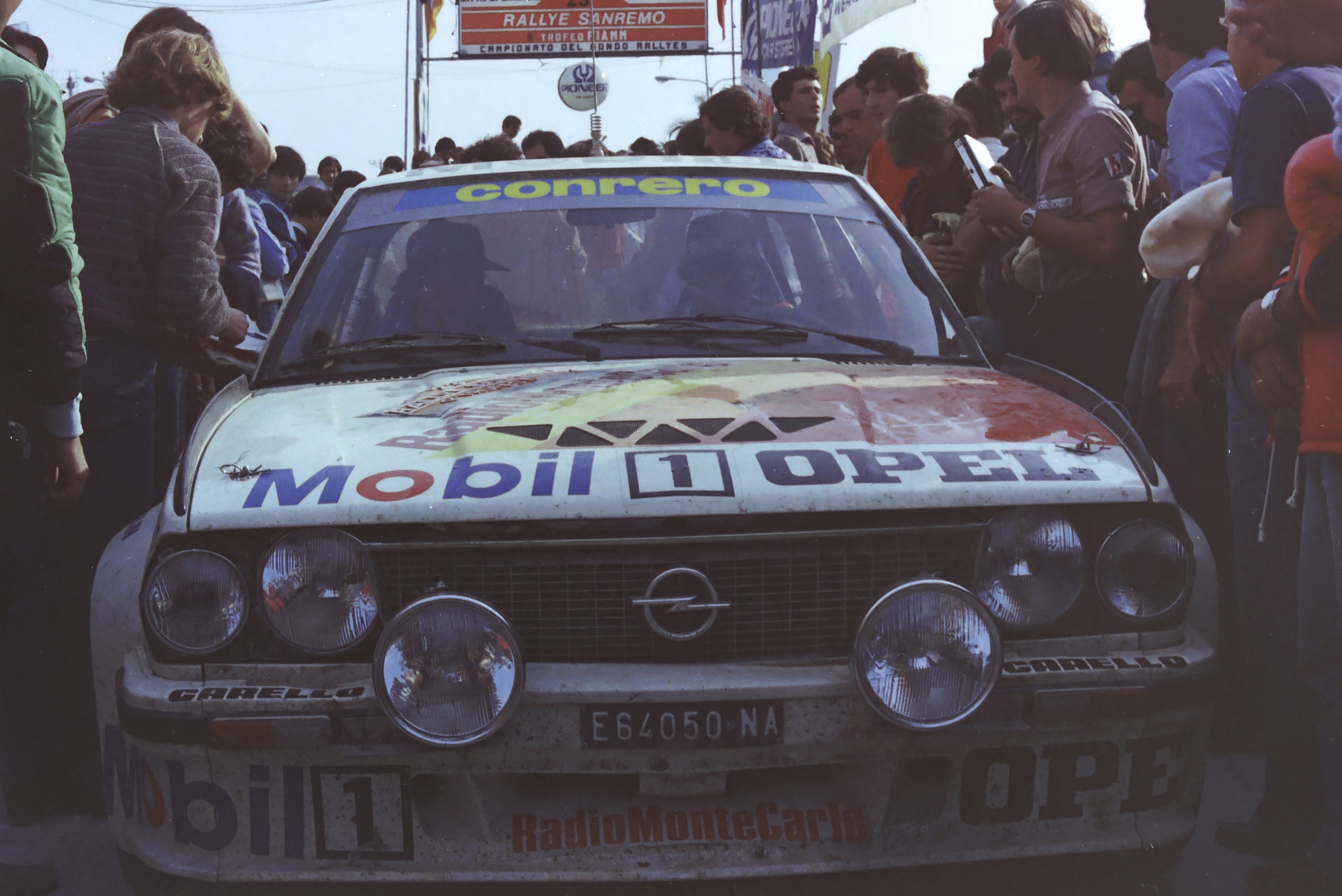
Conrero-Opel Ascona 400 of "Tony"/"Rudy" at the 1981 Rallye Sanremo

Virgilio Conrero (1 January 1918 – 6 January 1990) was an Italian automotive engineer, entrepreneur and racing team manager. He is known for tuning and racing cars from marques such as Alfa Romeo, Lancia, and Opel.

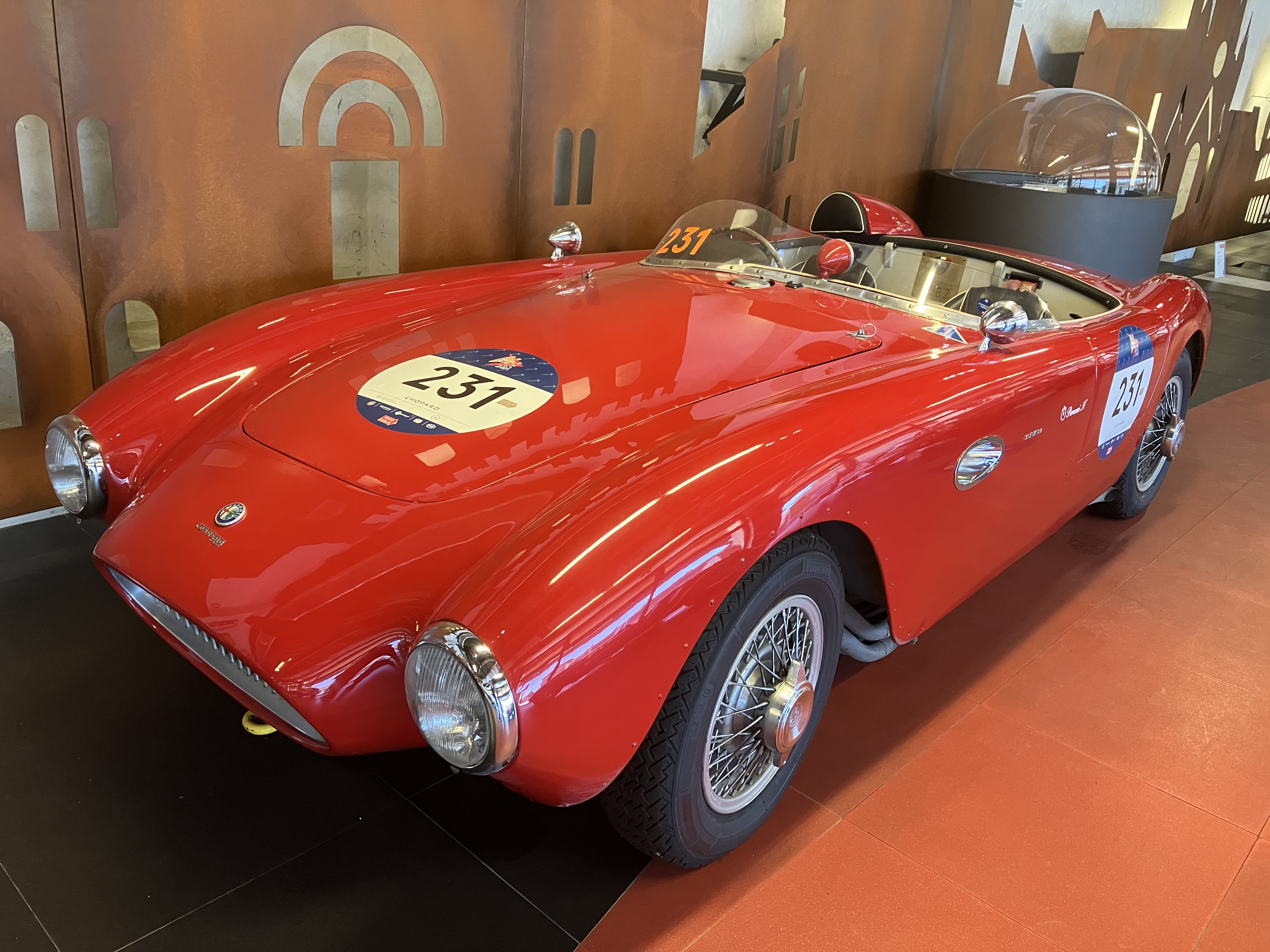
1953 Conrero Alfa Romeo Sport at the Museo Mille Miglia

== History ==
Conrero was born in Turin, Italy in 1918. After serving in the Regia Aeronautica as an aircraft mechanic in World War II, he established Autotecnica Conrero in 1951, and successfully tuned Alfa Romeo cars until 1969. During this time he also tuned Lancia Aurelia models. His workshops also built a small number of cars in the 1950s based on Alfa Romeo chassis, such as the Conrero Alfa Romeo that competed in the 20th Mille Miglia in 1953. He also built one of what had been a planned four-car team of Triumph Conreros for Le Mans. With only one car built, and Triumph facing financial difficulties, the car did not race.

After his involvement with Alfas ended, he began a cooperation with General Motors Italy, tuning and race preparing Opels, the German brand that was owned by General Motors for nearly a century. At the 1971 Targa Florio, the "Baby-Corvette" Opel GT 1900 finished 9th overall and surprisingly won the GT2.0 class against Porsche 911 and Porsche 914. Later, Antonio Fassina won rallys with a Opel Ascona 400.

The firm is now called Studio Futuro and located in Lugo. The main client is Lotus. The company also offers sporting accessories for cars. Conrero died in 1990.

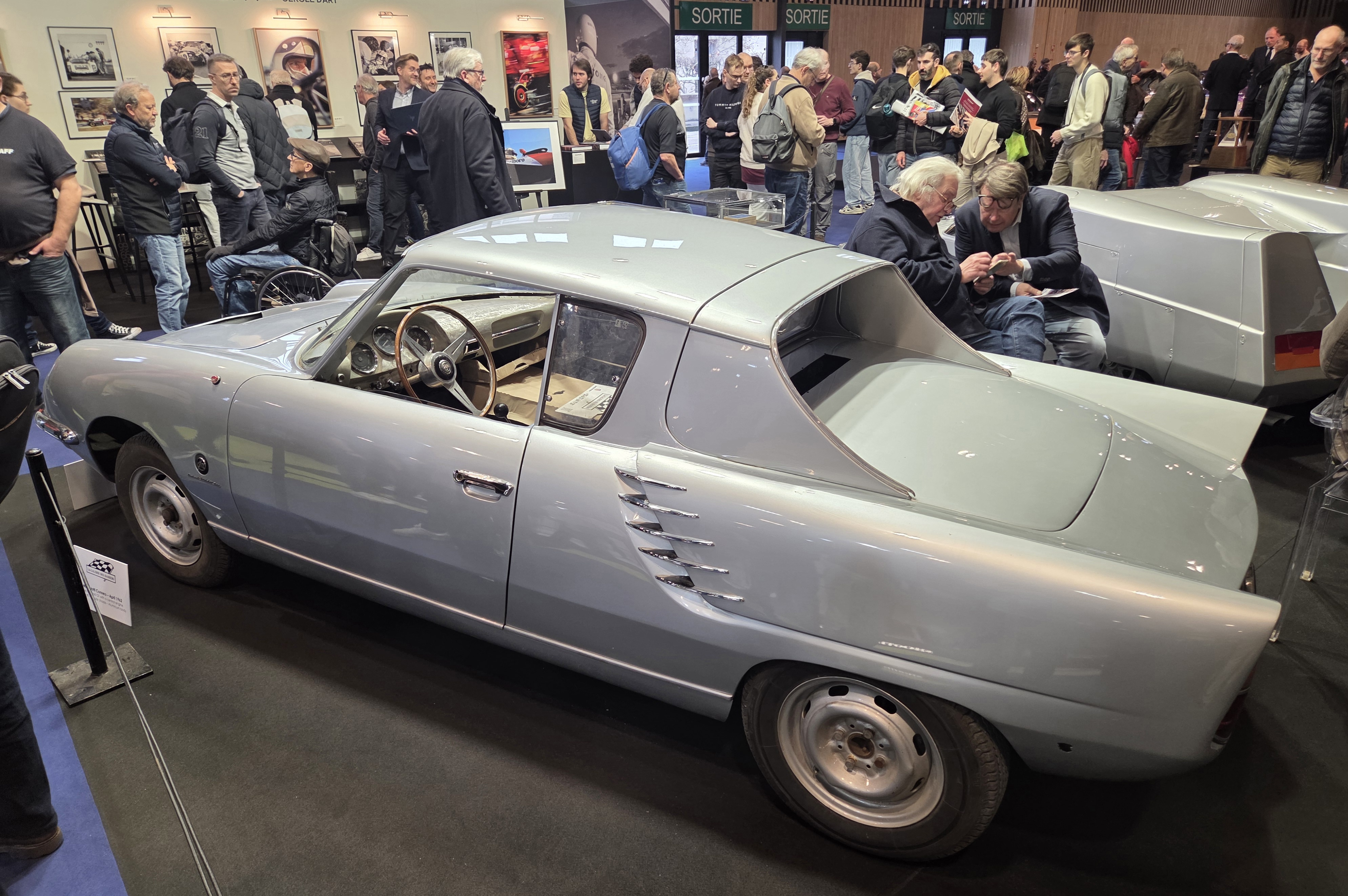
1962 Michelotti Conrero Boudot prototype
