= Triumph Sabrina engine =

Inline four-cylinder petrol car engine

Overview
- Manufacturer: Standard Motor Company
- Also called: 20X

Layout
- Configuration: I4
- Displacement: 1,985 cc (121.1 cu in)
- Cylinder bore: 90 mm (3.54 in)
- Piston stroke: 78 mm (3.07 in)
- Cylinder block material: Cast iron
- Cylinder head material: Aluminium
- Valvetrain: DOHC

Combustion
- Fuel type: Petrol
- Oil system: Wet sump
- Cooling system: Water-cooled

Dimensions
- Length: 26 1/4 in (667 mm)
- Width: 18 in (457 mm)
- Height: 26 1/4 in (667 mm)
- Dry weight: 438 lb (199 kg)

The Triumph Sabrina engine is an internal combustion engine for automotive applications developed by the Triumph Motor Company division of the Standard Motor Company in England in the late 1950s. It powered Triumph's Le Mans team entries in 1959, 1960, and 1961, and was considered for use in a production road car.

== History ==
In the late 1950s Triumph's Competitions department designed and built a new high-performance engine given the development name 20X. An investment of £49,000 was approved for its development, as 'Project 51', by the Standard-Triumph board at its meeting on 19 September 1960. Some sources call this the 'S' engine, after Triumph's TR3S and TRS Le Mans cars. The engine's two prominent front-facing domical camshaft end covers earned it the popular nickname "Sabrina", after contemporary British actress Norma Ann Sykes. Sabrina later became the engine's official name.

Harry Webster, director and general manager at Standard-Triumph, reported that the engine was developed to explore new casting and engine production techniques. It also incidentally gave Triumph a chance to improve their showing at Le Mans after their modest results in 1955.

To accommodate the engine, a modified TR3 chassis was created with a track widened by four inches and a wheelbase extended by six inches over those of the production car. In late 1958 Triumph commissioned Giovanni Michelotti to create a body for the 20X development chassis. The project, called Zoom, resulted in a full-width body, with tall doors having wind-down windows, and headlamps moved to the tops of the front wings. By 1959 two Zoom prototypes were complete; one convertible and one coupé with a removable roof panel, both powered by 20X engines detuned to around 120 hp (89 kW).

By the middle of 1960, Triumph had prototypes for two potential TR replacements — Zest and Zoom — with a combined program cost of £676,000. Zest had been conceived as the TR3's replacement, and Zoom was considered for production as an upmarket model. Having seen Zoom, some at Triumph wanted it to become the next TR, but the cost to produce the 20X engine in volume killed the project.

== Technical details ==
Sabrina is an inline four cylinder engine with dual overhead camshafts. The basic engine assembly is made up of five main components: an oil sump, a crankcase extension, the crankcase, a water jacket with cylinder liners, and a cylinder head. Of these, the crankcase is of cast iron, and the cylinder liners are of cast chrome-iron. The other components, including the water jacket, are cast in aluminium alloy. Alloy crankcases had been tried, but proved insufficiently rigid in bending.

Both the connecting rods and the crankshaft are of forged steel. The crankshaft is carried in five main bearings, two more than are in the Standard wet liner inline-four engine used in production TRs. The pistons are of die-cast aluminium, and the compression ratio was set by adjusting the height of the piston crown. Bore × stroke are 90 mm × 78 mm (3.54 in × 3.07 in), for a total displacement of 1,985 cc (121.1 cu in).

The cylinder head has four hemispherical combustion chambers, each with two valves having an included angle of slightly over 73°, with the exhaust valves being inclined about 4° more than the intakes. The valves are made of nimonic steel, and have double valve springs. The camshafts are hollow, and run in five bearings each. Valve tappets are inverted bucket style, with iron guides and adjustment by shims. The camshaft drive comes off the nose of the crankshaft via primary and secondary duplex chains with Renold hydraulic tensioners.

The cylinder head has a separate intake and exhaust port for each cylinder. The exhaust manifold is a 4-2-1 style, with joins at 16 in (41 cm) and 34 in (86 cm) from the head's square exhaust port. The engine is fitted with two twin-choke SU DU6 carburettors. The front of the engine mounts a separate case that includes drives for the camshafts, oil pump, fuel pump, distributor and tachometer, with provision for the future addition of a fuel injection pump and dry sump oil scavenge pump.

A complete engine less ancillaries is 26 1/4 in (667 mm) long, 18 in (457 mm) wide, and 26 1/4 in (667 mm) tall, making the twin cam engine 3 1/4 in (83 mm) longer than the Standard wet-liner engine and more than 1 in (25 mm) lower, while widths are the same. At 438 lb (199 kg), Sabrina was lighter than the Standard wet-liner engine.

Power and torque figures for the engines in the 1960 Le Mans cars were reported as better than 150 hp (112 kW) at 6500 rpm, and 142 lb⋅ft (193 N⋅m) at 5000 rpm. Power for later engines was expected to exceed 165 hp (123 kW).

== Motorsports ==
At the 1959 24 Hours of Le Mans, three extensively modified TR3s, referred to as 'TR3S' models, were run. While superficially resembling the production TR3, the Le Mans cars were six inches longer than the production model, had bodywork of glass fibre, and were powered by Sabrina engines. The teams of drivers in the cars were Peter Jopp/Richard "Dickie" Stoop, Ninian Sanderson/Claude Dubois, and Peter Bolton/Mickaël "Mike" Rothschild. Both the Sanderson/Dubois and Bolton/Rothschild cars retired after cooling fan blades detached from their respective engines and perforated the cars' radiators. The Jopp/Stoop TR3S was called in to have its blades removed, then ran as high as seventh place overall before being forced to retire due to an oil pump failure with just over an hour remaining in the race.

The three Triumph TRS race cars fielded at the 1960 24 Hours of Le Mans, registered as 926 HP, 927 HP and 928 HP, used the same chassis and engines as the previous year, with new fibreglass bodywork based on Triumph's Zoom prototype. The three driver teams this year consisted of Keith Ballisat/Marcel Becquart, Les Leston/Mike Rothschild, and Peter Bolton/Ninian Sanderson. The hardness of the metal in the valve inserts had been reduced from that of the 1959 engines, and during the course of the race the valve inserts were damaged, eliminating all tappet clearance. Post-race, with clearances restored but prior to a full rebuild, the engines still produced around 120 hp (89 kW). Despite the engine trouble, all three cars finished, in 15th, 18th, and 19th places, and staged a formation finish, but were unclassified due to having failed to cover their mandatory distance.

Triumph planned to field a revised car at la Sarthe in 1961, but the new cars were late, so the previous TRSes were updated, with power output raised by 5 hp (3.7 kW), and entered again in the 1961 race. The driver teams included Peter Bolton/Keith Ballisat, Les Leston/Rob Slotemaker, and Marcel Becquart/Mike Rothschild, which respectively finished 9th, 11th, and 15th overall, and claimed the manufacturer's team prize for Triumph.

== Triumph Conrero ==
The Sabrina was to be used in a batch of newly designed cars at Le Mans in 1961. Although a team of four cars was planned for the race, ultimately only one car was built, and it was not delivered until 1962.

A new body designed by Michelotti was fitted over a custom multi-tubular steel chassis fabricated by Italian engineer and Alfa Romeo tuner Virgilio Conrero.

When tested on the M1 motorway, the Sabrina-powered Triumph Conrero reached a speed of nearly 150 mph (240 km/h). The car did not race at Le Mans, as Triumph's Competitions Department was dissolved before it could be entered. It never appeared in any other race, but was run in practice at the 1963 12 Hours of Sebring. The Triumph Conrero was later returned to England for restoration, and appeared at the Brooklands Museum reunion in 2010.
