= Keith Ballisat =

British racing driver

- Born: Keith Norman R. Ballisat; 20 May 1928; Sutton, Surrey, England
- Died: 25 May 1996 (aged 68); Bridgwater, Somerset, England

Formula One World Championship career
- Nationality: (United Kingdom) British
- Active years: 1958, 1960
- Team: privateer Cooper
- Entries: 3 non-championship races
- Championships: 0
- Wins: 0
- Podiums: 0
- Career points: 0
- Pole positions: 0
- Fastest laps: 0
- First entry: 1958 BARC Aintree 200
- Last entry: 1960 Lombank Trophy

Keith Norman R. Ballisat (20 May 1928 – 25 May 1996) was a British racing driver, who drove in endurance races, rallies and Non-Championship Formula One races.

He has competed in events like Monte Carlo Rally, Coupe des Alpes, 24 Hours of Le Mans and Acropolis Rally.

== Career as racing driver ==
=== Rally sport ===
Keith Ballisat was engaged in the late 1950s and early 1960s in some rallies. In 1958 he was, together with Alain Bertaut, fourth overall in the Alpine Rally and in 1959, second overall in Tulpenrallye. In both cases, a Triumph TR3 was his emergency vehicle.

=== Circuit racing ===
During his time as a rally driver, Ballisat went in circuit racing at the start. Between 1958 and 1960 he contested the Formula Junior and Formula 2 races. At the Grand Prix de Caen 1958 (emergency vehicle a Cooper T43) it turned out that Lombank Trophy 1960, he finished in seventh place (Cooper T43) and the Crystal Palace Trophy in the same year as sixth (Cooper T43). He also went the Lavant Cup and the Norfolk Trophy in the race.

In the early 1960s, he was a sports car driver and a factory driver for the Standard Motor Company. He drove in 24 Hours of Le Mans four times, [in 1964 for the Rootes Group driving a Sunbeam Tiger] with the best placing in 1961 when he was ninth overall.

After his racing career, he worked for many years in the oil industry and among others for the racing activities of Shell in charge. He died at the age of 68 from cancer.

== Personal life ==
He was born in Sutton, Surrey to his parents, Frank Norman Ballisat and Evelyn (née Hogg) and had an older sister, Daphne (born 1926). He married Betty Webley in 1960.

== Event results ==
=== Rally races ===
Year	Rally	Car	Co-driver	Result
1958	Deutschland Rallye	Triumph TR3	Peter Roberts	10th
1958	Coupe des Alpes	Triumph TR3	Alain Bertaut	4th
1959	Monte Carlo Rally	Triumph TR3	Alain Bertaut	119th
1959	International Tulpenrallye	Triumph TR3A	E. Marvin	2nd
1959	Liege-Rome-Liege	Triumph TR3	Alain Bertaut	8th
1961	Acropolis Rally	Sunbeam Rapier	Peter Jopp	6th
1961	Coupe des Alpes	Sunbeam Rapier	Tiny Lewis	7th
