= Ferrari 250 GT SWB Breadvan =

One-off racing car

Ferrari 250 GT SWB Competizione (2819GT)
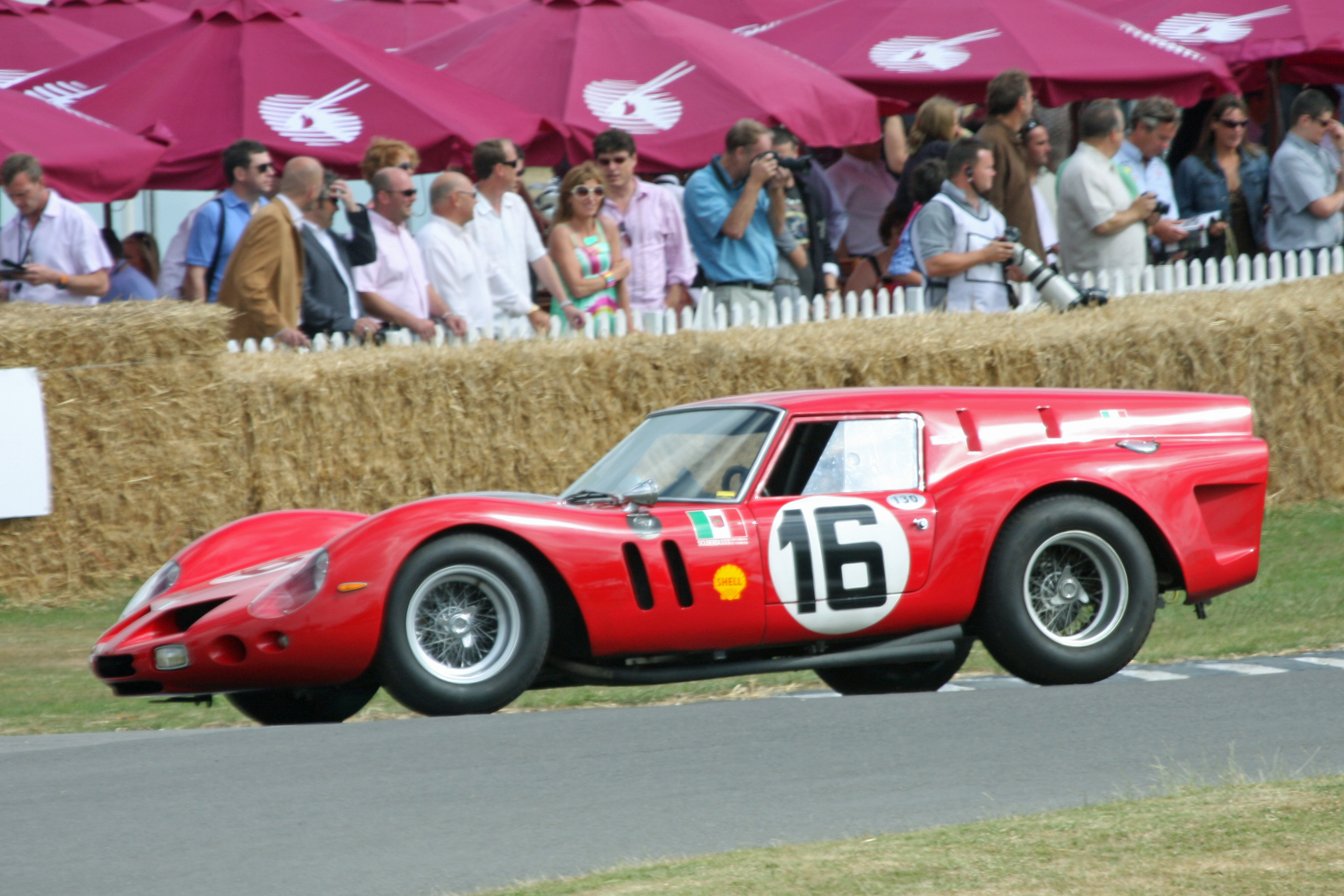
- Category: GT coupe
- Designers: Giotto Bizzarrini and Giovanni Volpi

Technical specifications
- Chassis: Ferrari type 539 (250 GT SWB 1961) chassis
- Wheelbase: 2,400 mm (94.5 in)
- Engine: Ferrari 250 Tipo 168 Comp./61 3 litre V12 NA Front mid-mounted
- Transmission: 250 SWB four-speed
- Weight: 935 kg (2,061.3 lb) (at 1962 24 Hours of Le Mans)
- Tyres: Dunlop Racing 600 L 15 & 650 L 15

Competition history
- Notable entrants: (Italy) Scuderia Serenissima
- Notable drivers: (Belgium) Olivier Gendebien (Belgium) Lucien Bianchi (France) Maurice Trintignant (Italy) Nino Vaccarella (Italy) Carlo Maria Abate (United Kingdom) Colin Davis (Italy) Ludovico Scarfiotti; Edgardo Mungo
- Debut: 1961 Tour de France Automobile with original berlinetta body
Races	Wins	Poles	F/Laps
6	2 GT Class	N/A	N/A

The Ferrari 250 GT SWB Competizione, commonly known as the 'Breadvan' or 'Drogo', is a one-off racecar made in 1962 from a 1961 Ferrari 250 GT Berlinetta SWB, chassis number 2819 GT. It was built by an ex-Ferrari engineer to compete against the small series of new 1962 Ferrari 250 GTO at the 1962 24 Hours of Le Mans and other FIA 1962 World Sportscar Championship races.

== Development ==
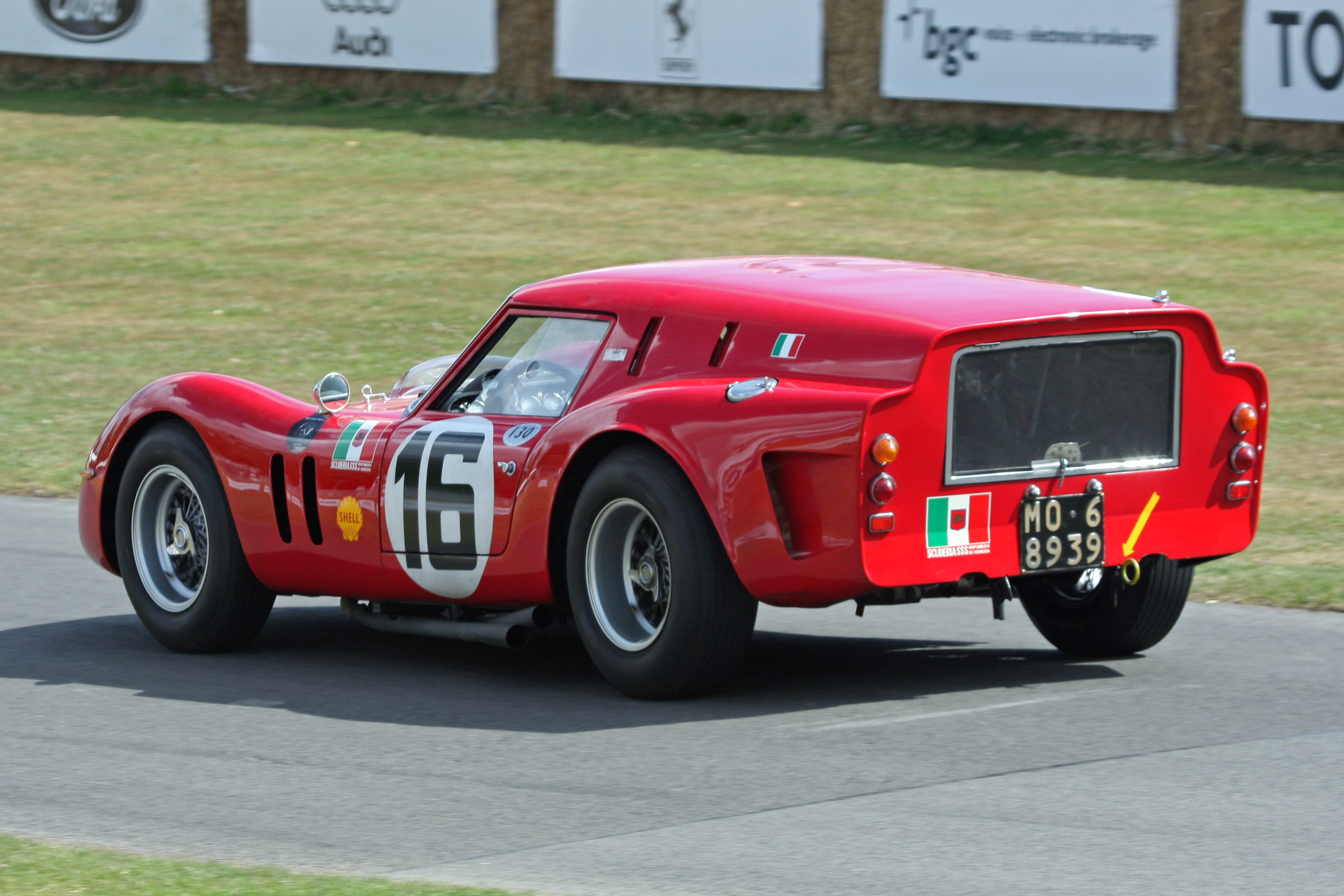
The Breadvan at the 2009 Goodwood Festival of Speed

Ferrari 250 GT SWB Breadvan
Ferrari 250 GT SWB Breadvan at Goodwood Festival of Speed 2009

In late 1961, after a dispute, several high ranking employees had to leave Ferrari in "the great walkout". In 1962, the ex-Ferrari engineer Giotto Bizzarrini was hired by Count Giovanni Volpi, owner of the Scuderia Serenissima racing team, to upgrade a 1961 Ferrari 250 GT SWB so it would be competitive with the then-new Ferrari 250 GTO Bizzarrini himself had developed but not completed. Enzo Ferrari had refused to sell any GTOs to Count Volpi, due to Volpi's hiring of former Ferrari employees at ATS.

The donor car for this project was a 250 GT SWB Competition, serial number 2819 GT. This car had previously competed in the 1961 Tour de France, where it took 2nd place overall driven by Olivier Gendebien and Lucien Bianchi. The car was sold by Gendebien to Volpi shortly afterward for use with Scuderia Serenissima. As with other competition-spec SWBs, this car had a lightweight body and chassis, minimal trim, and a more powerful 286 bhp Tipo 168 engine with Testarossa-type heads.

Bizzarrini applied all the ideas he had developed working on the GTO and together with the car body specialist Piero Drogo developed an aerodynamically advanced body, even lower than the GTO's, with the roof line dramatically extended to the rear end following Kamm aerodynamic theory. The resulting shooting-brake appearance led to the French press nicknaming it "La Camionnette" (little truck), while the English-speaking journalists called it the "Breadvan."

Bizzarrini moved the engine and radiator even further back to the center of the chassis than in the GTO, and lowered it by fitting a dry sump system. The original three 46 DCN Weber carburetors were replaced with six twin choke 38 DCN Webers. The original 4-speed gearbox was retained. Giorgio Neri and Luciano Bonacini of Modena were contracted to perform all the mechanical modifications and race preparation. The resulting car was significantly lighter than the GTO, at 935 kg (2,061.3 lb) compared to the typical GTO weight of 1,000 kg (2,204.6 lb). The GTO had a more advanced drivetrain based on prototype cars.

== Competition history ==
The rebodied Breadvan made its competition debut at the 1962 24 Hours of Le Mans. It quickly passed all Ferrari GTOs and was 7th overall during the 4th hour when a driveshaft failure caused its retirement. Results at other races proved the design's effectiveness, as the car won the GT class in two races during the 1962 season. The car's last race in period was at the Coppa Gallenga Hillclimb in 1965, however since 1973 it has appeared regularly at historic races worldwide, including events such as the Monterey Historic Automobile Races, the Goodwood Festival of Speed and the Tour Auto.

Complete race results 1961 with original 250 GT SWB body
Date	Race	Circuit	Team	Driver(s)	Result
September; 14-23; 1961	Tour de France	Tour de France	(Belgium) Ecurie Francorchamps	(Belgium) Olivier Gendebien (Italy) Lucien Bianchi	2nd GT; 2nd OA
October 22 1961	1000 km de Paris	Montlhéry	(Italy) Scuderia Serenissima	(France) Maurice Trintignant (Italy) Nino Vaccarella	3rd GT; 3rd OA

Complete race results 1962–1965
Date	Race	Circuit	Team	Driver(s)	Result	Notes
June 23–24; 1962	24 Hours of Le Mans	Circuit de la Sarthe	(Italy) Scuderia Serenissima	(Italy) Carlo Maria Abate (United Kingdom) Colin Davis	DNF	First race as Breadvan, was running 7th overall when drive shaft failed in 4th hour
August 6 1962	Guards Trophy	Brands Hatch	(Italy) Scuderia Serenissima	(Italy) Carlo Maria Abate (United Kingdom) Colin Davis	1st GT; 4th OA	
August 26 1962	Ollon-Villars Hillclimb	Ollon-Villars	(Italy) Scuderia Serenissima	(Italy) Carlo Maria Abate	1st GT; 4th OA	Set new GT course record of 4m 47.3s at 100.243 km/h
October 21 1962	1000 km de Paris	Montlhéry	(Italy) Scuderia Serenissima	(United Kingdom) Colin Davis (Italy) Ludovico Scarfiotti	3rd GT; 3rd OA	
November 11 1962	Puerto Rican GP	Caguas, Puerto Rico	(Italy) Scuderia Serenissima	(Argentina) Juan Manuel Bordeu	DNS	Entry withdrawn after death of Ricardo Rodríguez at the Mexican GP
March 28 1965	Coppa Gallenga Hillclimb	Castel Gandolfo	Unknown	Edgardo Mungo	9th OA	Car painted silver

== Influence ==
The 250 GT SWB Breadvan's unusual but effective aerodynamics proved the Kamm tail design that would be used on many other racing cars, including the Ford J-car and the Alfa Romeo Giulia TZ.

Following the success of the Breadvan, two additional 250 GT SWB cars (S/N 2053 GT and 2735 GT) were modified for privateer drivers by Bizzarrini, Drogo, Neri and Bonacini, distinctively bodied with similar shapes. A third modified Ferrari was planned but not completed. An Iso Rivolta, chassis number IR460368, was also rebodied by Drogo in a similar style to 2819 GT.

Similar shooting brake designs were used on later Ferrari concept cars and production cars such as the 456 GT Venice and the Ferrari FF.

In 2018, Niels van Roij, car designer and coachbuilder, was commissioned to create an homage vehicle. A Ferrari 550 Maranello was the base vehicle. The design and realisation of the vehicle was documented and regularly released for public viewing by van Roij.

== See also ==
- Maserati Tipo 154, a similar design by Drogo
