= Ludovico Scarfiotti =

Italian racing driver (1933–1968)

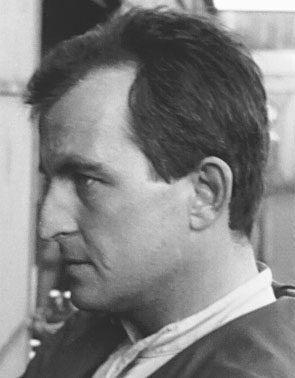
- Scarfiotti in 1966
- Born: 18 October 1933; Turin, Kingdom of Italy
- Died: 8 June 1968 (aged 34); Berchtesgaden, West Germany
- Cause of death: Injuries sustained whilst hillclimbing in a Porsche 910
- Spouse: Ida Benignetti (m. 1966)
- Children: 2

Formula One World Championship career
- Nationality: (Italy) Italian
- Active years: 1963–1968
- Team(s): Ferrari, Eagle, Cooper
- Entries: 12 (10 starts)
- Championships: 0
- Wins: 1
- Podiums: 1
- Career points: 17
- Pole positions: 0
- Fastest laps: 1
- First entry: 1963 Dutch Grand Prix
- First win: 1966 Italian Grand Prix
- Last entry: 1968 Monaco Grand Prix

24 Hours of Le Mans career
- Years: 1960–1967
- Teams: Ferrari, Serenissima
- Best finish: 1st (1963)
- Class wins: 2 (1963, 1967)

Ludovico Scarfiotti (18 October 1933 – 8 June 1968) was an Italian racing driver, who competed in Formula One from 1963 to 1968. Scarfiotti won the 1966 Italian Grand Prix with Ferrari. In endurance racing, Scarfiotti won the 24 Hours of Le Mans and the 12 Hours of Sebring, both in 1963 with Ferrari.

Born in Turin, Scarfiotti was the grandson of Lodovico Scarfiotti, co-founder and former president of Fiat. He initially competed in sportscar racing, racing for Ferrari from 1960 onwards. He finished third in the 1962 1000 km of Paris before winning the 24 Hours of Le Mans in 1963 alongside Lorenzo Bandini, driving the Ferrari 250 P. His victory at Le Mans—along with his win at the 12 Hours of Sebring—prompted his Formula One debut with Ferrari at the 1963 Dutch Grand Prix. Scarfiotti made sporadic appearances for the team over the next five seasons, including his sole win at the Italian Grand Prix in 1966. He added to his sportscar success with a runner-up finish at Le Mans in 1967, as well as at the 24 Hours of Daytona. After a one-off appearance for Eagle in 1967, Scarfiotti signed for Cooper the following season.

A motorsports competitor for a decade, Scarfiotti had also won the sportscar class of the European Hillclimb Championship in 1962 and 1965. In June 1968, Scarfiotti died at a hillclimbing event in the German Alps when he crashed his Porsche 910.

== Early life ==
Scarfiotti was born in Turin. Scarfiotti was associated with cars from his youth. His grandfather was the first president and one of the nine founders of the Fiat automobile company.

== Sports car competition ==
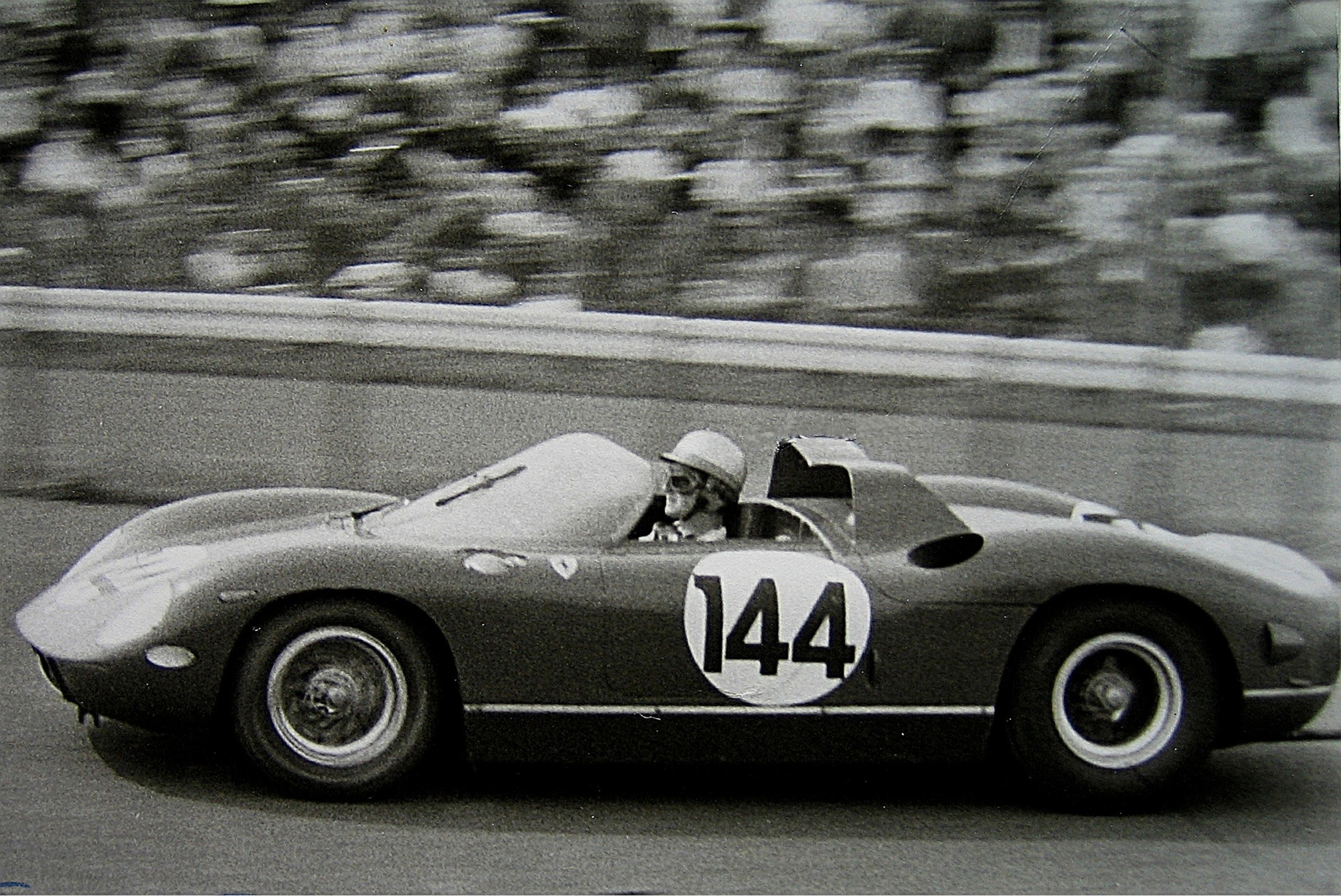
Scarfiotti driving Ferrari 275 P at the Nürburgring in 1964

Scarfiotti competed in the 1,000 Kilometres de Paris sports car race in October 1962. He finished third with teammate Colin Davis. The event was won by Pedro Rodríguez and Ricardo Rodríguez driving a Ferrari. Partnered with Lorenzo Bandini, Scarfiotti was victorious in the 24 Hours of Le Mans in June 1963. Their factory Ferrari achieved an average speed of 117.99 miles per hour over a distance of 2,832 miles (4,558 km). The victory was worth almost $20,000 in various prize money along with prestige, and gave Ferrari its fourth consecutive Le Mans victory.

In 1965, John Surtees and Scarfiotti shared a Ferrari 330 P2 Spyder which gave the marque a fourth consecutive victory at the 1000km Nürburgring race. They led throughout the 44 laps, posting a winning time of 6 hours, 53 minutes, and 5 seconds, for an average speed of 90.46 mph (145.58 km/h). Scarfiotti and Bandini drove a 2-litre Dino 206 S to second place in the 1966 running of the 1,000 kilometre Nürburgring in which first place went to Phil Hill and Joakim Bonnier driving a 5.4-litre Chevrolet-powered Chaparral. The Dino was 90 seconds behind the Chaparral that debuted the automatic transmission in European competition.

Surtees severed relations with the Ferrari racing team following their decision to replace him with Scarfiotti at the 1966 24 Hours of Le Mans. Scarfiotti would go on to finish 31st, retiring after 123 laps. Scarfiotti joined Mike Parkes in a Ferrari P4 for the 1000 km Spa in May 1967. They finished a lap behind Jacky Ickx and Richard Thompson, who drove a Ford Mirage (race car). The winning team averaged 120.5 mph (193.9 km/h) and posted a time of 5 hours, 9 minutes, 46.5 seconds.

Teamed with Mike Parkes, Scarfiotti took the new Ferrari P4 coupe to second place behind the sister car (a P4 spyder) driven by Lorenzo Bandini and Chris Amon at the 24 Hours of Daytona, with Ferrari taking the first three positions. The same result took place at the Monza 1,000 km in April. Scarfiotti, again teamed with Parkes finished second at the 24 Hours of Le Mans, this time behind the Ford Mark IV driven by A.J. Foyt and Dan Gurney. Scarfiotti raced a Ferrari factory car in the September 1967 200-mile Canadian-American Challenge Cup race held on a 2.85-mile (4.59 km) course near Bridgehampton, New York. His sponsor was the North American Racing Team of Luigi Chinetti.

After Günter Klass was killed in July 1967, Ferrari retired the two-litre Dino 206S prototypes that were also used in hillclimbing. After a fast 1967 24 Hours of Le Mans race won by a 7-litre V8-powered Ford ahead of Scarfiotti/Parkes, the big engines were banned for the 1968 WSC season in which prototypes were limited to max 3-litre engines, same size as in F1, but those were designed to last for 300 km, not 1000 km or 24 hours. Ferrari was forced to retire the 4-litre V12 Ferrari P series, and in protest to the rule change, did not enter the 1968 World Sportscar Championship. With the Germans also being active in hillclimbing, Scarfiotti joined Porsche.

Scarfiotti entered the 1968 Targa Florio, but wrecked his Porsche 907 (#230) on the first day of qualifying and was forced to race with Porsche's T-car which did not last the 720-kilometre-long (450 mi) road race.

== Formula One ==
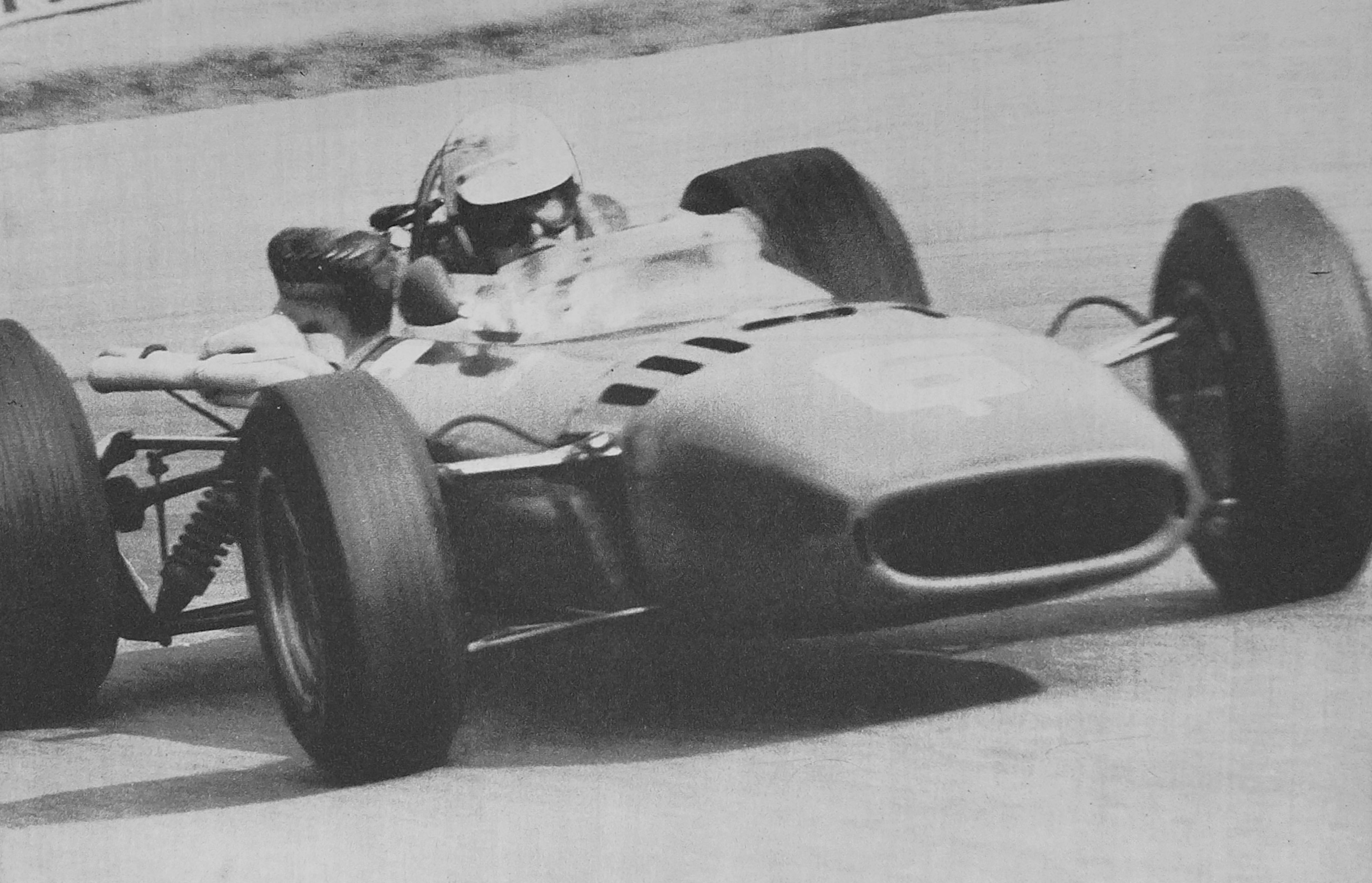
Scarfiotti driving Ferrari 312 F1-66 at Monza in 1966

Enzo Ferrari signed Scarfiotti to the Ferrari Formula One team of drivers for 1963 along with Surtees, Willy Mairesse, Bandini, and Nino Vaccarella. Scarfiotti placed sixth in the second Ferrari in the 1963 Dutch Grand Prix at Zandvoort. He was a lap behind victor Jim Clark in a Lotus. John Surtees piloted the first Ferrari to third place behind Dan Gurney in a Brabham. Scarfiotti finished fifth in the non-championship 1965 Syracuse Grand Prix on the island of Sicily.

Scarfiotti became the first Italian in fifteen years to win the Italian Grand Prix when he drove his Ferrari to a track record speed of 136.7 mph (220.0 km/h) at the 1966 event. Scarfiotti was also the last Italian to win it until Kimi Antonelli won the 2026 event, sixty years later.

Following the death of Bandini from burns sustained during the 1967 Monaco Grand Prix, Ferrari entered two F1 cars for Scarfiotti and Parkes in the non-championship 1967 Syracuse Grand Prix. Scarfiotti drove a 1966 3-litre Ferrari 312 whereas Parkes drove a 1967 with the 1966 nose to accommodate his long frame. They shared the victory when they crossed the finish line in an unusual dead heat. They were clocked at 113.65 mph (182.90 km/h), recording an official time of 1 hour 40 minutes 58 seconds for the 191.2-mile (307.7 km) race. At the GPs of Zandvoort and Spa, both Parkes and Scarfiotti were part of a three-car Scuderia, with a 4-5-6 place finish at the Dutch GP suggesting equal speed of these three drivers, but both Parkes and Scarfiotti were one lap behind Amon, despite Parkes qualifying only 0.1 sec slower than Amon, with Scarfiotti being a full second off pace. At Spa, Parkes had a career-ending accident, while Scarfiotti was 4 laps behind and not classified. For the rest of the 1967 F1 WC Season, Ferrari entered only one car, for Chris Amon. For his home GP at Monza, the winner of the 1966 event secured a drive in the second All American Racers Eagle Mk1, a quite promising move, as Dan Gurney had won the race at the very fast Spa circuit. However, both Weslake V12 failed early in the race.

With Ferrari hiring Jacky Ickx and Amon for 1968, there was no place for Scarfiotti, who entered F1 races for Cooper instead. Brian Redman and Scarfiotti came in third and fourth respectively at the 1968 Spanish Grand Prix in Jarama, both driving for Cooper. In his final Formula One appearance, Scarfiotti placed fourth in the 1968 Monaco Grand Prix, an event marked by mechanical breakdowns that eliminated 11 of 16 starters before the race was completed.

== Death ==
Scarfiotti died in 1968 at a hillclimbing event on the Roßfeldhöhenringstraße near Berchtesgaden, Germany, in the German Alps. He became the third Grand Prix driver to die in 1968, following Jim Clark and Mike Spence. Scarfiotti wrecked his Porsche 910 during trials when the car veered abruptly off the Rossfeldstrasse track and catapulted ten yards down a tree-covered slope. The Porsche hung in the trees and Scarfiotti was thrown from the cockpit. He was discovered, badly injured, fifty yards away. He died in an ambulance of numerous fractures. Huschke von Hanstein, the team manager of Porsche, stated that he had never been associated with a fatal accident during the eighteen years he had been in charge of the team. 60 yards (55 m) of burned rubber braking indicated that Scarfiotti had slammed on his brakes at the final moment.

Scarfiotti was married to Ida Benignetti and had two children from a previous relationship.

== Racing record ==
=== Complete Formula One World Championship results ===
(key) (Races in italics indicate fastest lap)

Year	Team	Chassis	Engine	1	2	3	4	5	6	7	8	9	10	11	12	WDC	Points
1963	Scuderia Ferrari	Ferrari 156	Ferrari 178 1.5 V6	MON	BEL; WD	NED; 6	FRA; DNS	GBR	GER	ITA	USA	MEX	RSA			16th	1
1964	Scuderia Ferrari	Ferrari 156	Ferrari 178 1.5 V6	MON	NED	BEL	FRA	GBR	GER	AUT	ITA; 9	USA	MEX			NC	0
1965	Scuderia Ferrari	Ferrari 1512	Ferrari 207 1.5 V12	RSA	MON	BEL	FRA	GBR	NED	GER	ITA	USA	MEX; DNS			NC	0
1966	Scuderia Ferrari	Ferrari 246	Ferrari 228 2.4 V6	MON	BEL	FRA	GBR	NED	GER; Ret							10th	9
1966	Scuderia Ferrari	Ferrari 312/66	Ferrari 218 3.0 V12							ITA; 1	USA	MEX				10th	9
1967	Scuderia Ferrari	Ferrari 312/67	Ferrari 242 3.0 V12	RSA	MON	NED; 6	BEL; NC	FRA	GBR	GER	CAN					21st	1
1967	Anglo American Racers	Eagle T1G	Weslake 58 3.0 V12									ITA; Ret	USA	MEX		21st	1
1968	Cooper Car Company	Cooper T86	Maserati 10/F1 3.0 V12	RSA; Ret												16th	6
1968	Cooper Car Company	Cooper T86B	BRM P101 3.0 V12		ESP; 4	MON; 4	BEL	NED	FRA	GBR	GER	ITA	CAN	USA	MEX	16th	6

=== Non-championship Formula One results ===
(key) (Races in bold indicate pole position) (Races in italics indicate fastest lap)

Year	Entrant	Chassis	Engine	1	2	3	4	5	6
1965	Scuderia Centro Sud	BRM P578	BRM P56 1.5 V8	ROC; NC	SYR; 5	SMT	INT	MED	RAN
1967	Scuderia Ferrari	Ferrari 312	Ferrari 242 3.0 V12	ROC; 5	SPC	INT	SYR; 1	OUL	ESP

=== Complete 24 Hours of Le Mans results ===
Year	Team	Co-Drivers	Car	Class	Laps	Pos.	Class Pos.
1960	(Italy) Scuderia Ferrari	(Mexico) Pedro Rodríguez	Ferrari 250 TRI/60	S3.0	22	DNF (Out of fuel)	
1961	(Italy) Scuderia Serenissima	(Italy) Nino Vaccarella	Maserati Tipo 63	S3.0	53	DNF (Engine)	
1962	(Italy) S.E.F.A.C. Ferrari	(Italy) Giancarlo Baghetti	Ferrari 268 SP	E2.0	230	DNF (Clutch)	
1963	(Italy) SpA Ferrari SEFAC	(Italy) Lorenzo Bandini	Ferrari 250 P	P3.0	339	**1st**	**1st**
1964	(Italy) SpA Ferrari SEFAC	(United Kingdom) Mike Parkes	Ferrari 275 P	P4.0	71	DNF (Oil pump)	
1965	(Italy) SpA Ferrari SEFAC	(United Kingdom) John Surtees	Ferrari 330 P2 Spyder	P4.0	225	DNF (Gearbox)	
1966	(Italy) SpA Ferrari SEFAC	(United Kingdom) Mike Parkes	Ferrari 330 P3	P5.0	123	DNF (Accident)	
1967	(Italy) SpA Ferrari SEFAC	(United Kingdom) Mike Parkes	Ferrari 330 P4	P5.0	384	**2nd**	**1st**

=== Complete 12 Hours of Sebring results ===
Year	Team	Co-Drivers	Car	Class	Laps	Pos.	Class Pos.
1963	(Italy) S.E.F.A.C. Ferrari	(United Kingdom) John Surtees	Ferrari 250 P	P3.0	209	**1st**	**1st**
1964	(Italy) S.E.F.A.C. Ferrari	(Italy) Nino Vaccarella	Ferrari 275 P	P+3.0	213	**2nd**	**2nd**
1966	(Italy) SpA Ferrari SEFAC	(Italy) Lorenzo Bandini	Ferrari Dino 206 S	P2.0	206	5th	**2nd**
1968	(Germany) Porsche Automobile Co.	(United States) Joe Buzzetta	Porsche 907 2.2	P3.0	7	DNF (Valve spring)	

=== Complete 24 Hours of Daytona results ===
Year	Team	Co-Drivers	Car	Class	Laps	Pos.	Class Pos.
1967	(Italy) Ferrari SpA	(United Kingdom) Mike Parkes	Ferrari 330 P4	P+2.0	663	**2nd**	**2nd**

== See also ==
- Formula One drivers from Italy

Sporting positions
Preceded by Olivier Gendebien; Phil Hill	Winner of the 24 Hours of Le Mans; 1963; With: Lorenzo Bandini	Succeeded by Jean Guichet; Nino Vaccarella
