= 1962 24 Hours of Le Mans =

30th 24 Hours of Le Mans endurance race

| Previous: 1961 | Next: 1963 |
Index: Races | Winners

The 1962 24 Hours of Le Mans was a motor race for Experimental cars and Grand Touring cars, staged at the Circuit de la Sarthe, Le Mans, France on 23 and 24 June 1962. It was the 30th Grand Prix of Endurance and the eighth round of the 1962 International Championship of Manufacturers.

The race was won by Olivier Gendebien and Phil Hill driving a Ferrari 330 TRI/LM. It would be the last overall win for a front-engined GT-style car, and it made Ferrari the most successful marque at Le Mans, with six wins at the time, a streak that would be continued with V12 mid-engine Ferrari Prototypes until 1965.

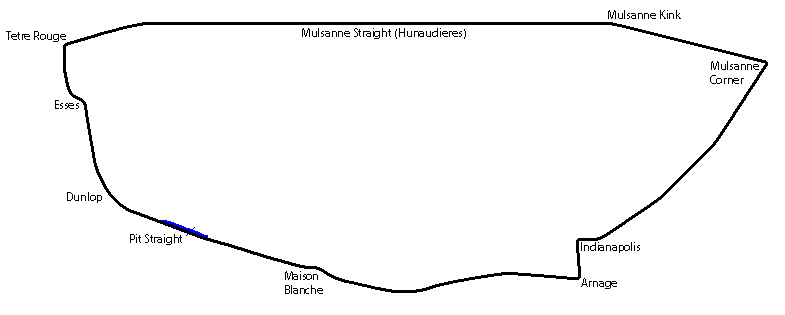
Circuit de la Sarthe in 1962

== Regulations ==
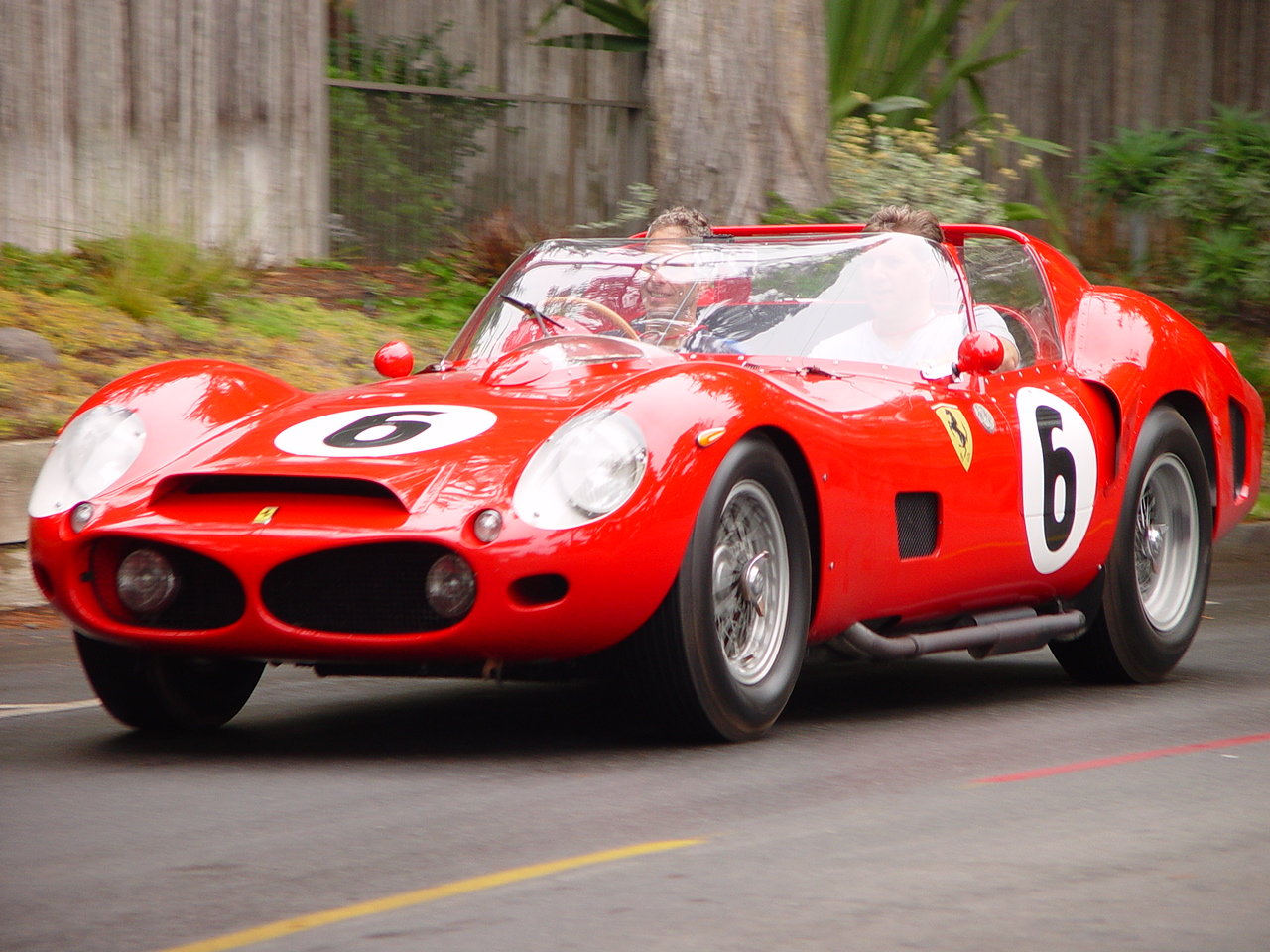
The winning Ferrari 330 TRI/LM, pictured in 2004

The CSI (Commission Sportive Internationale - the FIA’s regulations body) initiated its new championship aimed specifically for GT cars. The International Championship of Manufacturers was expanded to 15 races, including endurance and short races and hill-climbs, open to all or some of the eligible classes.

However the Le Mans organisers, the Automobile Club de l'Ouest (ACO), realised the public popularity of the Sports Car category and formulated their own development of the existing rules. The aim was to encourage prototypes of potential future GT designs. The maximum engine size for those cars (now called ‘Experimental’) was lifted from 3 to 4 litres. This approach was adopted by the four major endurance events (Sebring, Targa Florio, Nürburgring and Le Mans) who combined to create the Challenge Mondial de Vitesse et Endurance (Speed World Challenge) within the FIA championship that lasted to 1974.

== Entries ==
The ACO's ideas had the desired effect and there were 79 applications for the race to be reduced to 60 cars to practice for the 55 starting places.

Aside from Ferrari and Maserati, a number of companies arrived with new prototypes including Aston Martin, Tojeiro, TVR, Abarth and OSCA. The CSI windscreen rules were influencing design, favouring closed-cars, and only 6 of the 55 starters were open-top.

There were 28 ‘works’ entries. Four-car teams came from Ferrari, Abarth and Panhard et Levassor. Most other works and privateer teams brought 3-car teams.

| Category | Classes | Experimental Entries | GT Entries | Total Entries |
|---|---|---|---|---|
| Large-engines | 5.0+, 5.0, 4.0, 3.0, 2.5L | 15 | 12 (+3 reserves) | 27 |
| Medium-engines | 2.0, 1.6, 1.3L | 7 (+3 reserves) | 10 (+4 reserves) | 17 |
| Small-engines | 1.15, 1.0, 0.85L | 11 (+4 reserves) | 0 | 11 |
| Total Cars | | 33 (+7 reserves) | 22 (+7 reserves) | 55 (+14 reserves) |

Again, Ferrari was the dominant marque in the race with 18 entries – the biggest representation from any marque at a Le Mans. Sports-car specialist Abarth was next with 9 cars.

SEFAC Ferrari had bounced back from the chaos at the end of 1961, when top designer Carlo Chiti led a walkout of key staff from the company. His last design, the new 330 TRI/LM was finished by Mauro Forghieri. This last front-engined Ferrari sports car had a 4-litre V12 developing a mighty 390 bhp. It was given to Ferrari's best endurance pair, Phil Hill and Olivier Gendebien. The same engine was also fitted into an updated version of the 250 GTO (Chassis No. 3765), the 330 LMB to be driven by Mike Parkes and Lorenzo Bandini. Ferrari also arrived with two variations of its successful mid-engine cars, the 246 SP V6 for the fan-favourite Rodriguez brothers, and the 268 SP V8 for Ludovico Scarfiotti / Giancarlo Baghetti.

The previous year's TRI/61 cars were sold, one each, to the two Ferrari customer teams: the North American Racing Team (NART) who also had a non-standard 250 GT that had to enter the ‘Experimental’ category. The other went to Italian Count Giovanni Volpi’s Scuderia Serenissima team. However, the count had incurred Enzo Ferrari’s wrath by hiring Chiti and his fellows and could no longer buy Ferrari cars. He therefore got Chiti to redesign a 250 GT with large aerodynamic back end. Nicknamed the ‘breadvan’ its low profile made it very fast, and it was given to Carlo Maria Abate and Colin Davis.

Bucking the trend of moving toward mid-engined cars, the new Maserati T151 was a front-engined 3.9-litre V8 generating 360 bhp and an aerodynamic Kamm tail. Four were entered, including two for Briggs Cunningham and the new Maserati France team. They proved to be the fastest cars on the straights, reaching 287 kp/h (180 mph). However they lost time to the better-handling Ferraris through the curves.

Aston Martin returned to Le Mans with a new prototype based on its DB4 – the Project 212. John Wyer, the team manager and mastermind behind their 1959 Le Mans win was now the company's CEO. The 4-litre Straight-6 engine developed 330 bhp and pushed the car to 270 kp/h (170 mph) down the Mulsanne straight. The car would be raced by Masten Gregory and Graham Hill.

Le Mans regulars, the Ecurie Ecosse team, got John Tojeiro to build them a pair of coupés, utilising a mid-mounted 2.5-litre Coventry Climax F1 engine. The chassis were barely finished in time, and were dispatched to Le Mans unpainted. When the transporter had a traffic accident in Kent en route, it damaged the ready car, so the team chose to scratch the unassembled car.

In the middle-sized engine classes, there was only a single entry from TVR, the small British sports-car manufacturer, in the 2-litre class. A similar British company, Marcos, was in the 1.6-litre class against a pair of OSCA 1600GTs. The 1300cc class was solely contested by five Abarth coupés, now powered by 125 bhp SIMCA engines.

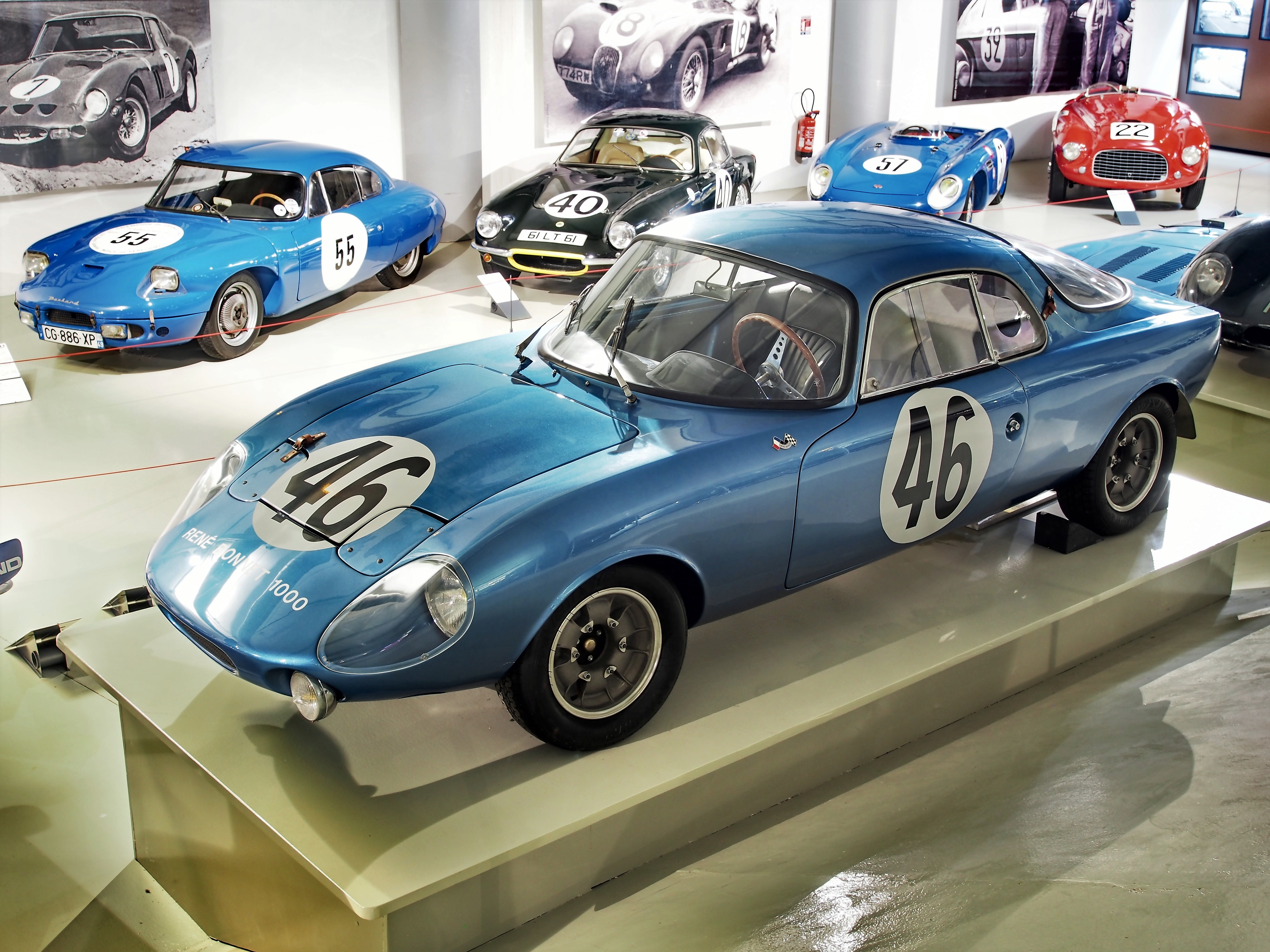
The René Bonnet Djet of Consten/Rosinski, which won the Experimental 1 liter class.

In the smallest classes there was a remarkable change to the entry list from the previous years. Abarth augmented their larger cars with standard 700cc Fiat-engined cars. After the break-up of the Deutsch et Bonnet partnership, Panhard and Bonnet arrived with new cars. Charles Deutsch stayed with Panhard power for the returning works team, while René Bonnet presented his new Djet with Renault engines.

At the recent race at a wet Nürburgring, Colin Chapman’s Lotus 23 driven by Jim Clark had led the whole field. He entered two such cars for Index honours, but was stymied at scrutineering because the front and rear wheels had different numbers of wheel studs. The officials said the compulsory spare wheel therefore could not be universally applied. Chapman pulled the entries and swore he would never return to Le Mans – and never did.

As with previous years, the GT division was dominated by Ferrari cars. As well as three of the 250 GT, there were five of the stunning new 250 GTO entered by customer teams. It carried the 3-litre engine from the Testarossa sports car. Although the GT regulations stipulated that 100 examples had to have been built, Ferrari was able to convince the authorities that it was actually a derivation of an existing model - the 250 GT. Permitted under the rules loophole, it could use that production record to get homologation (the ‘O’ in ‘GTO’).

The previous year's Jaguar E2A prototype had now been homologated as the ‘E-type’ and there were three such cars entered, including Briggs Cunningham’s team again. Cunningham was co-driven by Le Mans race-winner Roy Salvadori because he could not fit into Brigg's Maserati cars. As well as an Austin-Healey 3000, there were also a pair of Aston Martin DB4s including a return from Frenchman Jean Kerguen.

The biggest car in the field was the private American-entry Chevrolet Corvette, virtually stock with its 327 cu in (5.4-litre) Stingray engine modified to produce 360 bhp.

In the 2-litre GT class, the Morgan Plus 4 works car was entered again after being rejected in the previous year for looking too old-fashioned. The Super Sport version had an uprated Triumph engine produce 115 bhp and capable of 120 mph (190 km/h).

The 1.6-litre class was to be a battle between three Porsche-Abarths (Porsche 356 B Carrera GTL Abarth, also referred to as Porsche 695 GS Abarth) and three works Sunbeams. Porsche had decided not to enter their new 2.0 Flat-8 Type 771/1 in the Experimental class. In the 1.3-litre class it was between the Elites of Team Lotus and the Alfa Romeo Giuliettas of the Scuderia St Ambroeus.

== Practice ==
Once again, the public roads were closed to allow a test weekend on 7–8 April, which 33 entrants availed themselves of. Fastest time was put down by Willy Mairesse in the Ferrari 250 GT SWB, doing a 4:07.1, quicker than his time in the new GTO of 4:10.8.

On race-week, in the Wednesday evening practice Phil Hill, Ferrari's F1 world champion, broke Mike Hawthorn’s longstanding lap record from 1957 by over two seconds (3:55.1). Mike Parkes in the GTO prototype was second fastest (3:58.6), then came Thompson in the Cunningham Maserati (3:59.1), the Aston Martin of Graham Hill (3:59.8), McLaren’s Maserati (4:01.3) and Pedro Rodriguez in the Ferrari (4:02.2).

By contrast the Bianchi’s new Abarth-Simca recorded a 4:34.3. The only serious incident was when Robert Bouharde crashed his small Bonnet Djet at Maison Blanche, destroying the car. He was taken to hospital with a knee injury.

== Race ==
=== Start ===
Saturday was fine and sunny. This year Maurice Baumgartner, new President of the CSI, was the honorary starter. Graham Hill was the first under the Dunlop Bridge but got into a drag race down the long straight with Parkes in the GTO prototype. With both cars braking late, the Aston Martin punted the Ferrari off into the sandtrap at Mulsanne corner, immediately costing him many laps. On the second lap Gendebien managed to pass Hill cleanly on the straight. On the third lap the TVR became the first retirement when Peter Bolton pitted with all his water gone, long before any replenishment was permitted.

So for the first hour the big Ferrari led Hill from the three Maseratis of Kimberley, Trintignant and McLaren. Pedro Rodriguez had initially got up to third before slipping back to sixth. Then came the Ferraris of Gurney, Baghetti, Abate’s ‘breadvan’ and Guichet's GTO leading the GT division in tenth. But the better handling and fuel economy of the Ferrari got the Mexican brothers back to second as the pit stops rotated. Pushing Phil Hill hard (he broke Hawthorn's 1957 race lap record in the third hour) they hit the front in the third hour. The other Ferrari of Scarfiotti/Baghetti slotted into a secure third place.

Count Volpi's ‘breadvan’ Ferrari had been running 7th, leading the other GTOs when it was stopped by a broken propshaft in the 3rd hour. After running in fourth for the first three hours, a faulty dynamo on the Aston Martin necessitated a number of pit-stops, taking it out of the running and it finally retired before midnight. The three Maseratis stayed in contact, taking the lead briefly on fuel-stop strategies.

=== Night ===
Dick Thompson was the first Maserati to falter (about 8.30pm) when he spun at the Esses with new brake pads, swiping the rear and rupturing his oil-tank. McLaren's Maserati had got into second but threw a tyre-tread that dropped it a number of places. Mike Parkes’ trip to the sandtrap eventually killed the 330 LMB's radiator and they were retired after 10pm.

The two Ferraris swapped the lead throughout the night, thrilling the huge crowd with close racing. Third, and two laps back, was the Scarfiotti Ferrari then the leading GTO, of Noblet. The French Maserati had been running 7th but retired about 2am after an earlier spin on oil had left the suspension dangerously off-balance. The Maserati challenge finally died out when the second Cunningham car, of Hansgen/McLaren running 6th, retired in the 12th hour when its differential packed up.

The Ecosse Tojeiro had been running midfield until just before 11pm when Tom Dickson suddenly found himself coasting in neutral in the fast section approaching Maison Blanche. It was several dangerous minutes, with cars racing past in the darkness before marshals were able to assist pushing the car off the track to safety. The big Chevrolet V8 had likewise been running midfield but soon after the halfway mark Jack Turner accidentally put the car into reverse at the Mulsanne corner. Destroying the gearbox it was left with only third gear and the constant hi-revs soon broke the fuel injection.

=== Morning ===
For once a dry night dawned into a sunny day. Only 33 of the 55 starters were still running. Things were falling Ferrari's way until at 4.45am the Rodriguez car suddenly broke its final drive. This finally allowed Hill & Gendebien to ease off and rest a potentially troublesome clutch. There was still drama for Gendebien though when he narrowly missed a big accident with a backmarker that was stopped in the middle of the road after spinning in the dawn light. Three hours later the other Ferrari also retired on the Mulsanne straight, with a broken clutch. This moved up the new Ferrari GTOs onto the podium: Pierre Noblet's privateer entry ahead of the NART modified-GTO of Grossman/Roberts and the Equipe Nationale Belge car of “Beurlys”/”Eldé”.

The two remaining Jaguar E-types were next, the British privateers keeping four laps ahead of Briggs Cunningham. In a race-long duel the leading, Herrmann/Barth, Porsche 2-litre GT had been chasing the smaller 1.2-litre Lotus Elite of Hobbs/Gardner. Both had steadily moved up the field through the night and got into the top-10 during the morning. Then the Lotus dropped onto three cylinders allowing the Porsche to overtake it.

=== Finish and post-race ===
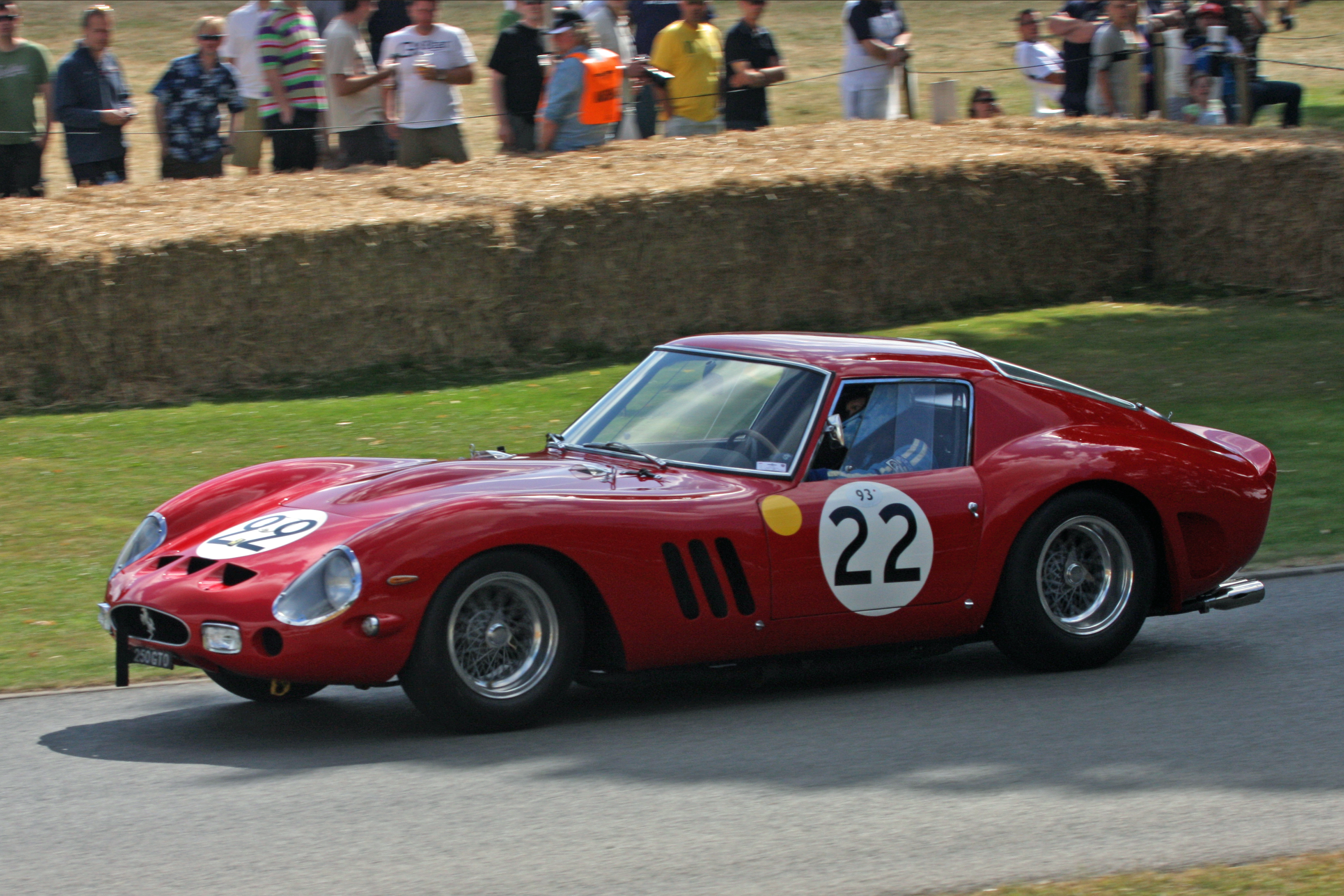
The Ferrari 250 GTO which placed third overall and second in the Grand Touring 3000 class. The car is pictured in 2009.

Positions remained relatively static for the last four hours, excepting the American Ferrari that slipped to sixth with starter-motor problems. Hill and Gendebien finished a comfortable 5 laps ahead of the Frenchmen. Noblet/Guichet improved from their 3rd-place from the previous year, winning the GT division and finishing a clear 12 laps ahead of the Belgian GTO.

The rest of the field has clusters of close finishes: In the last hour, Cunningham's Jaguar finally managed to get past their British rivals and finished 4th. Peter Sargent's car had a broken engine mount then its gearbox got jammed in top gear but were able to nurse the car home.

In the end, Herrmann and Barth had a strong finish in the Porsche, despite a failing gearbox, and pushed up to finish 7th, less than a lap ahead of the recovering Lotus. Chapman was thrilled to be able to win the Index of Thermal Efficiency (achieving over 20mpg), sharing the prize with the Dubois/Harris Abarth-Simca.

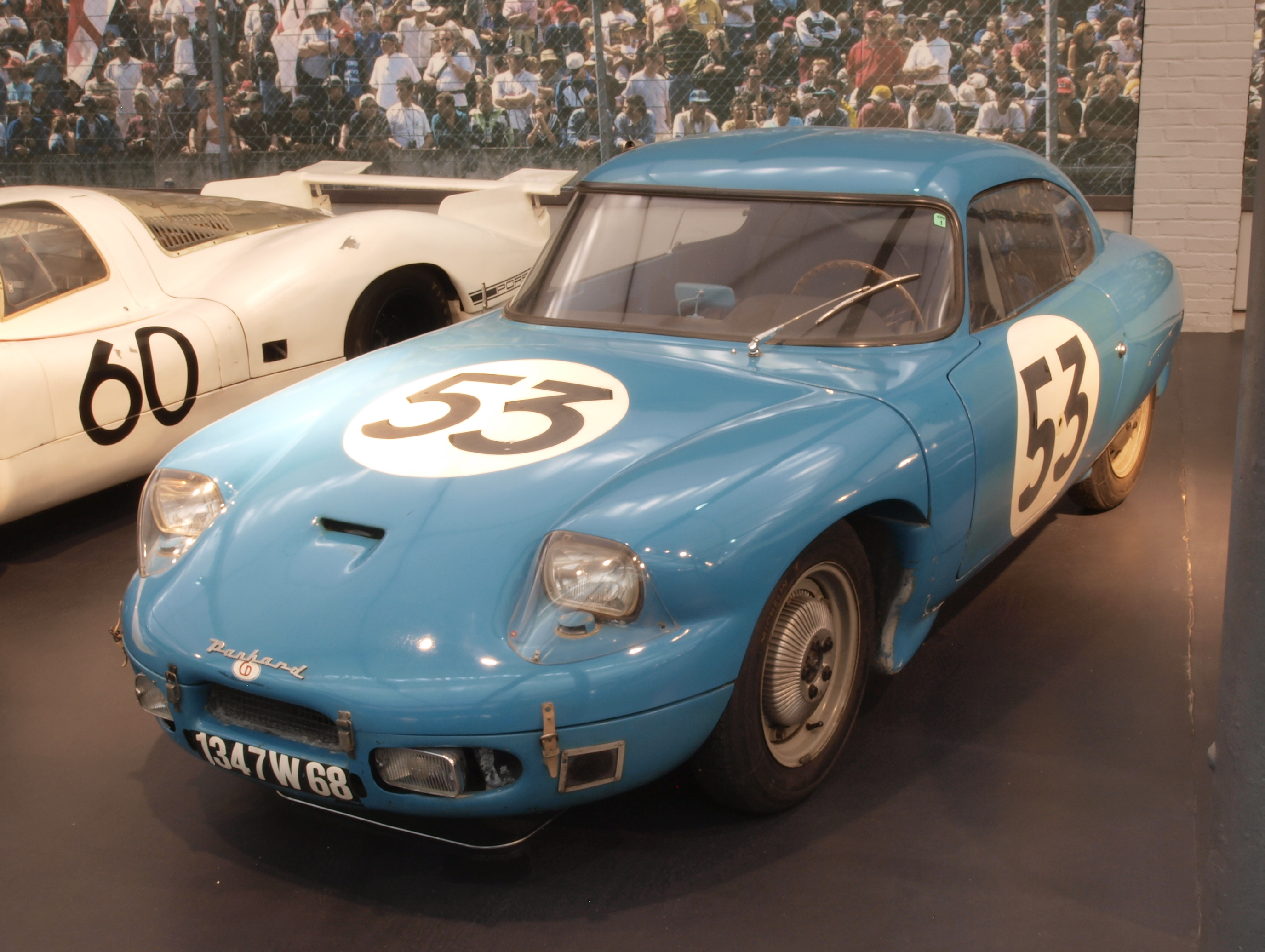
Panhard CD Dyna of Guilhaudin/Bertaut, which won the Experimental 850cc class and the Index of Performance

In the battle for the Index of Performance between the French Panhard, Renault and SIMCA, victory went to the sole-surviving CD-Panhard of Guilhardin/Bertaut. In a close finish they just beat two of the new Bonnet-Renault Djets. The ‘old-fashioned’ Morgan soldiered on throughout and after their sole competition Equipe Chardonnet AC Ace retired after only four hours, the finished 13th and claimed the GT 2-litre class win.

Even though only four of their 15 starters made it to the finish, the win made Ferrari the most successful marque at Le Mans, with six wins, ahead of Jaguar's and Bentley's five. As it turned out, it would be the last win for a front-engined car. His fourth win made Olivier Gendebien became the most successful driver at Le Mans – until the arrival of the legendary Jacky Ickx at the end of the decade. That success, and the near miss he had at dawn, convinced him to promptly announce his retirement while on a highpoint.

This was the last Le Mans for OSCA – in 1963 the Maserati brothers sold the company to Count Domenico Agusta, owner of the motorcycle company MV Agusta. Likewise, this was the last hurrah for the original Ecurie Ecosse team, who had won the race outright in 1956 and 1957 with the Jaguar D-type.

Over several years, the young Mexican Rodriguez brothers had excited the crowd with their fast, competitive driving. The younger brother, Ricardo, was killed in November in practice for the non-championship Mexican Grand Prix. He was 20 years old. Paul Armagnac, twice a winner of the Performance Index for DB, had recently built a new circuit at Nogaro in south-western France. This was his last of eight Le Mans as he too was killed at the end of the year, at Montlhèry.

== Official results ==
=== Finishers ===
Results taken from Quentin Spurring's book, officially licensed by the ACO Class Winners are in Bold text.

| Pos | Class | No | Team | Drivers | Chassis | Engine | Laps |
|---|---|---|---|---|---|---|---|
| 1 | E +3.0 | **6** | (Italy) **SEFAC Ferrari** | (Belgium) **Olivier Gendebien** (United States) **Phil Hill** | Ferrari 330 TRI/LM | Ferrari 4.0L V12 | 331 |
| 2 | GT; 3.0 | **19** | (France) **P. Noblet** (private entrant) | (France) **Pierre Noblet** (France) **Jean Guichet** | Ferrari 250 GTO | Ferrari 3.0L V12 | 326 |
| 3 | GT; 3.0 | 22 | (Belgium) Equipe Nationale Belge | (Belgium) “Eldé” (Leon Dernier) (Belgium) “Beurlys” (Jean Blaton) | Ferrari 250 GTO | Ferrari 3.0L V12 | 314 |
| 4 | GT +3.0 | **10** | (United States) **Briggs Cunningham** | (United States) **Briggs Cunningham** (United Kingdom) **Roy Salvadori** | Jaguar E-Type Coupé | Jaguar 3.8L S6 | 310 |
| 5 | GT +3.0 | 9 | (United Kingdom) P.J. Sargent (private entrant) | (United Kingdom) Peter Sargent (United Kingdom) Peter Lumsden | Jaguar E-Type Coupé | Jaguar 3.8L S6 | 310 |
| 6 | E 3.0 | **17** | (United States) **North American Racing Team** | (United States) **Bob Grossman** (United States) **Glenn ‘Fireball’ Roberts** | Ferrari 250 GTO | Ferrari 3.0L V12 | 297 |
| 7 | GT; 1.6 | **34** | (West Germany) **Porsche System Engineering** | (West Germany) **Edgar Barth** (West Germany) **Hans Herrmann** | Porsche 356 B Carrera GTL Abarth | Porsche 1588cc F4 | 287 |
| 8 | GT; 1.3 | **44** | (United Kingdom) **Team Lotus Engineering** | (United Kingdom) **David Hobbs** (Australia) **Frank Gardner** | Lotus Elite Mk14 | Coventry Climax 1216cc S4 | 286 |
| 9 | GT; 3.0 | 21 | (Italy) SEFAC Ferrari | (United States) Ed Hugus (United States) George Reed | Ferrari 250 GT SWB Sperimentale | Ferrari 3.0L V12 | 281 |
| 10 | GT; 1.3 | 39 | (Italy) Scuderia St. Ambroeus | (Italy) Giancarlo Sala (Italy) Marcello de Luca di Lizzano | Alfa Romeo Giulietta SZ | Alfa Romeo 1290cc S4 | 281 |
| 11 | GT; 1.3 | 45 | (United Kingdom) Team Lotus Engineering | (United Kingdom) Clive Hunt (United Kingdom) Dr John ‘Mac’ Wyllie | Lotus Elite Mk14 | Coventry Climax 1216cc S4 | 278 |
| 12 | GT; 1.6 | 35 | (France) A. Veuillet (private entrant) | (France) Robert Buchet (Switzerland) Heinz Schiller | Porsche 356 B Carrera GTL Abarth | Porsche 1588cc F4 | 272 |
| 13 | GT; 2.0 | **29** | (United Kingdom) **Morgan Motor Company** | (United Kingdom) **Chris Lawrence** (United Kingdom) **Richard Shepherd-Baron** | Morgan Plus 4 Super Sports | Triumph 1991cc S4 | 270 |
| 14 | E 1.3 | **43** | (Belgium) **Equipe Nationale Belge** | (Belgium) **Claude Dubois** (Belgium) **Georges Harris** | Abarth 1300 | Simca 1288cc S4 | 268 |
| 15 | GT; 1.6 | 32 | (United Kingdom) Sunbeam Talbot | (United Kingdom) Peter Harper (United Kingdom) Peter Procter | Sunbeam Alpine | Sunbeam 1590cc S4 | 268 |
| 16 | E 850 | **53** | (France) **Panhard & Levassor** | (France) **André Guilhaudin** (France) **Alain Bertaut** | CD Dyna Coupé | Panhard 702cc F2 | 255 |
| 17 | E 1.15 | **46** | (France) **Automobiles René Bonnet** | (France) **Bernard Consten** (France) **José Rosinski** | Bonnet Djet | Renault 996cc S4 | 255 |
| 18 | E 850 | 50 | (France) Automobiles René Bonnet | (France) Paul Armagnac (France) Gérard Laureau | Bonnet Djet 2 Spider | Renault 706cc S4 | 253 |

=== Did Not Finish ===
| Pos | Class | No | Team | Drivers | Chassis | Engine | Laps | Reason |
|---|---|---|---|---|---|---|---|---|
| DNF | E 3.0 | 27 | (Italy) SEFAC Ferrari | (Italy) Giancarlo Baghetti (Italy) Ludovico Scarfiotti | Ferrari 268 SP | Ferrari 2.6L V8 | 230 | clutch (18hr) |
| DNF | E 1.6 | 37 | (Italy) Automobili O.S.C.A. | (United States) George Arents (France) José Behra | O.S.C.A. 1600 GT Zagato | OSCA 1569cc S4 | 227 | gearbox (23hr) |
| DNF | GT; 1.3 | 40 | (Italy) Scuderia St. Ambroeus | (Switzerland) Karl Foitek (Italy) Riccardo Ricci | Alfa Romeo Giulietta SZ | Alfa Romeo 1290cc S4 | 225 | clutch (23hr) |
| DNF | GT; 3.0 | 24 | (United Kingdom) Ecurie Chiltern | (United Kingdom) Sir John Whitmore (South Africa) Bob Olthoff | Austin-Healey 3000 | BMC 2.9L S6 | 212 | piston (19hr) |
| DNF | GT; 3.0 | 23 | (France) F. Tavano (private entrant) | (France) Fernand Tavano (France) André Simon | Ferrari 250 GTO | Ferrari 3.0L V12 | 202 | differential (16hr) |
| DNF | GT; 1.6 | 33 | (United Kingdom) Sunbeam Talbot | (United Kingdom) Paddy Hopkirk (United Kingdom) Peter Jopp | Sunbeam Alpine | Sunbeam 1590cc S4 | 187 | engine (16hr) |
| DNF | E +3.0 | 2 | (United States) Briggs Cunningham | (New Zealand) Bruce McLaren (United States) Walt Hansgen | Maserati Tipo 151 Coupé | Maserati 3.9L V8 | 177 | differential (13hr) |
| DNF | E 3.0 | 28 | (Italy) SEFAC Ferrari | (Mexico) Ricardo Rodríguez (Mexico) Pedro Rodriguez | Ferrari 246 SP | Ferrari 2.4L V6 | 174 | transmission (14hr) |
| DNF | GT; 3.0 | 58 (reserve) | (Italy) Scuderia SSS Republica di Venezia | (Italy) Nino Vaccarella (Italy) Giorgio Scarlatti | Ferrari 250 GTO | Ferrari 3.0L V12 | 172 | engine (15hr) |
| DNF | E 850 | 56 | (France) R. Masson (private entrant) | (France) Roger Masson (Italy) Teodore Zeccoli | Abarth 700S | Fiat 701cc S4 | 171 | engine (17hr) |
| DNF | GT; 3.0 | 20 | (United Kingdom) UDT Laystall Racing Team | (United Kingdom) Innes Ireland (United States) Masten Gregory | Ferrari 250 GTO | Ferrari 3.0L V12 | 165 | electrical (15hr) |
| DNF | E +3.0 | 4 | Maserati France | (France) Maurice Trintignant (Belgium) Lucien Bianchi | Maserati Tipo 151 Coupé | Maserati 3.9L V8 | 152 | suspension (10hr) |
| DNF | GT +3.0 | 1 | (United States) / (United Kingdom) Scuderia Scirocco | (United States) Tony Settember (United Kingdom) Jack Turner | Chevrolet Corvette Coupé | Chevrolet 5.4L V8 | 150 | piston (14hr) |
| DNF | E 3.0 | 18 | (United States) North American Racing Team | (Canada) Peter Ryan (United States) John Fulp | Ferrari 250 TRI/61 | Ferrari 3.0L V12 | 150 | accident (15hr) |
| DNF | GT +3.0 | 12 | (France) J. Kerguen (private entrant) | (France) Jean Kerguen (France) "Franc" (Jacques Dewez) | Aston Martin DB4 GT Zagato | Aston Martin 3.7L S6 | 134 | head gasket (12hr) |
| DNF | E 850 | 55 | (France) Panhard & Levassor | (France) Guy Verrier (France) Bernard Boyer | CD Dyna Coupé | Panhard 702cc F2 | 128 | engine (14hr) |
| DNF | GT +3.0 | 14 | (United Kingdom) M. Salmon (private entrant) | (United Kingdom) Mike Salmon (United Kingdom) Maj Ian Baillie | Aston Martin DB4 GT Zagato | Aston Martin 3.7L S6 | 124 | piston (12hr) |
| DNF | E 850 | 51 | (Italy) Abarth Corse & Cie | (France) Régis Fraissinet (France) Paul Condrillier | Abarth 700S | Fiat 701cc S4 | 115 | piston (14hr) |
| DNF | E 3.0 | 25 | (United Kingdom) Ecurie Ecosse | (United Kingdom) Jack Fairman (United Kingdom) Tommy Dickson | Tojeiro EE Coupé | Coventry Climax 2.5L S4 | 81 | gearbox (9hr) |
| DNF | E 1.6 | 38 | (United Kingdom) Marcos Cars | (United Kingdom) John Hine (United Kingdom) Dick Prior | Marcos GT Gullwing | Ford 1502cc S4 | 80 | oil pipe (9hr) |
| DNF | E +3.0 | 11 | (United Kingdom) David Brown Racing Dept. | (United Kingdom) Graham Hill (United States) Richie Ginther | Aston Martin DP212 | Aston Martin 4.0L S6 | 78 | oil pipe (7hr) |
| DNF | E 850 | 54 | (France) Panhard & Levassor | (France) Pierre Lelong (France) Jean-Pierre Hanrioud | CD Dyna Coupé | Panhard 702cc F2 | 73 | accident (9hr) |
| DNF | E +3.0 | 3 | (United States) Briggs Cunningham | (United States) Bill Kimberley (United States) Dick Thompson | Maserati Tipo 151 Coupé | Maserati 3.9L V8 | 62 | accident (6hr) |
| DNF | E 1.3 | 41 | (Italy) Abarth Corse & Cie | (France) Roger Delageneste (France) Jean Rolland | Abarth 1300 | Simca 1288cc S4 | 60 | ignition (7hr) |
| DNF | E +3.0 | 7 | (Italy) SEFAC Ferrari | (United Kingdom) Mike Parkes (Italy) Lorenzo Bandini | Ferrari 330 LMB | Ferrari 4.0L V12 | 56 | radiator (7hr) |
| DNF | GT +3.0 | 8 | (United Kingdom) M. Charles (private entrant) | (United Kingdom) Maurice Charles (United Kingdom) John Coundley | Jaguar E-Type Coupé | Jaguar 3.8L S6 | 53 | engine (4hr) |
| DNF | GT; 2.0 | 60 (reserve) | (France) A. Chardonnet (private entrant) | (France) Jean-Claude Magne (France) Maurice Martin | AC Ace | Bristol 1971cc S6 | 49 | clutch (5hr) |
| DNF | GT; 1.6 | 30 | (West Germany) Porsche System Engineering | (Netherlands) Carel Godin de Beaufort (Netherlands) Ben Pon | Porsche 356 B Carrera GTL Abarth | Porsche 1588cc F4 | 35 | ignition (4hr) |
| DNF | GT; 3.0 | 59 (reserve) | (Belgium) Equipe Nationale Belge | (Belgium) Georges Berger (Belgium) Robert Darville | Ferrari 250 GT SWB | Ferrari 3.0L V12 | 35 | accident (4hr) |
| DNF | E 3.0 | 15 | (Italy) Scuderia SSS Republica di Venezia | (Sweden) Joakim ‘Jo’ Bonnier (United States) Dan Gurney | Ferrari 250 TRI/61 | Ferrari 3.0L V12 | 30 | gearbox (4hr) |
| DNF | E 3.0 | 16 | (Italy) Scuderia SSS Republica di Venezia | (Italy) Carlo Maria Abate (United Kingdom) Colin Davis | Ferrari 250 GT Drogo | Ferrari 3.0L V12 | 30 | prop shaft (4hr) |
| DNF | E 1.3 | 62 (reserve) | (Italy) Abarth Corse & Cie | (Italy) Gianni Balzarini (Austria) Franz Albert | Abarth 1300 | Simca 1288cc S4 | 30 | gearbox (4hr) |
| DNF | E 1.3 | 42 | (Italy) Abarth Corse & Cie | (France) Henri Oreiller (Switzerland) Tom Spychinger | Abarth 1300 | Simca 1288cc S4 | 21 | ignition (4hr) |
| DNF | E 850 | 61 (reserve) | (France) Automobiles René Bonnet | (France) Jean Vinatier (France) Jean-Claude Vidilles | Bonnet Djet | Renault 706cc S4 | 13 | overheating (5hr) |
| DNF | E 1.6 | 36 | (Italy) Automobili O.S.C.A. | (United States) John Bentley (United States) John Gordon | O.S.C.A. 1600 GT Zagato | OSCA 1569cc S4 | 12 | engine (4hr) |
| DNF | E 850 | 52 | (Italy) Abarth Corse & Cie | (Italy) Herbert Demetz (Italy) Oddone Siggala | Abarth 700S | Fiat 701cc S4 | 12 | ignition (5hr) |
| DNF | E 2.0 | 31 | (United Kingdom) TVR Cars | (United Kingdom) Peter Bolton (United Kingdom) Ninian Sanderson | TVR Grantura Mk3 | MG 1623cc S4 | 3 | overheating (1hr) |

=== Did Not Start ===
| Pos | Class | No | Team | Drivers | Chassis | Engine | Reason |
|---|---|---|---|---|---|---|---|
| DNS | E 850 | 49 | (France) Automobiles René Bonnet | (France) Robert Bouharde (France) Jean Vinatier | Bonnet Djet | Renault 706cc S4 | practice accident |
| RES | GT; 1.6 | 64 (reserve) | (United Kingdom) Sunbeam Talbot | (United Kingdom) Keith Ballisat (United Kingdom) Ian Lewis | Sunbeam Alpine | Sunbeam 1590cc S4 | Not required |
| RES | E 2.0 | 65 (reserve) | (United Kingdom) TVR Cars | (Netherlands) Rob Slotemaker (United Kingdom) Ted Lund | TVR Grantura Mk3 | MG 1623cc S4 | Not required |
| RES | E 850 | 68 (reserve) | (France) “Sarayac” (Guy Flayac) (private entrant) | (France) Georges Alexandrovitch (France) Lucien Barhe | Abarth 1000S | Fiat 1000cc S4 | Not required |
| RES | E 850 | 70 (reserve) | (France) Panhard & Levassor | (France) Robert Neyrat (France) Robert Mougin | CD Dyna Coupé | Panhard 702cc F2 | Not required |

=== Class Winners ===
| Class | Winners | | | | |
|---|---|---|---|---|---|
| Experimental >4000 | not eligible | | Grand Touring >4000 | no finishers | |
| Experimental 4000 | #6 Ferrari 330 TRI/LM | Gendebien / Hill | Grand Touring 4000 | #10 Jaguar E-Type Coupé | Cunningham / Salvadori |
| Experimental 3000 | #17 Ferrari 250 GTO | Grossman / Roberts | Grand Touring 3000 | #19 Ferrari 250 GTO | Noblet / Guichet |
| Experimental 2500 | no finishers | | Grand Touring 2500 | no entrants | |
| Experimental 2000 | no finishers | | Grand Touring 2000 | #29 Morgan Plus 4 Super Sports | Lawrence / Shepherd-Baron |
| Experimental 1600 | no finishers | | Grand Touring 1600 | #34 Porsche 356 B Carrera GTL Abarth | Herrmann / Barth |
| Experimental 1300 | #43 Abarth 1300 | Dubois / Harris | Grand Touring 1300 | #44 Lotus Elite | Hobbs / Gardner |
| Experimental 1150 | no entrants | | Grand Touring 1150 | no entrants | |
| Experimental 1000 | #46 Bonnet Djet | Consten / Rosinski | Grand Touring 1000 | not eligible | |
| Experimental 850 | #53 CD Dyna Coupé | Guilhaudin / Bertaut | Grand Touring 850 | not eligible | |

=== Index of Thermal Efficiency ===
| Pos | Class | No | Team | Drivers | Chassis | Score |
|---|---|---|---|---|---|---|
| 1= | GT; 1.3 | 44 | (United Kingdom) Team Lotus Engineering | (United Kingdom) David Hobbs (Australia) Frank Gardner | Lotus Elite Mk14 | 1.27 |
| 1= | E 1.3 | 43 | (Belgium) Equipe Nationale Belge | (Belgium) Claude Dubois (Belgium) Georges Harris | Abarth 1300 | 1.27 |
| 3 | GT; 1.3 | 45 | (United Kingdom) Team Lotus Engineering | (United Kingdom) Clive Hunt (United Kingdom) Dr John ‘Mac’ Wyllie | Lotus Elite Mk14 | 1.17 |
| 4 | E 850 | 53 | (France) Panhard & Levassor | (France) André Guilhaudin (France) Alain Bertaut | CD Dyna Coupé | 1.15 |
| 5 | GT; 1.3 | 39 | (Italy) Scuderia St. Ambroeus | (Italy) Giancarlo Sala (Italy) Marcello de Luca di Lizzano | Alfa Romeo Giulietta SZ | 1.10 |
| 6 | GT; 1.6 | 34 | (West Germany) Porsche System Engineering | (West Germany) Edgar Barth (West Germany) Hans Herrmann | Porsche 356 B Carrera GTL Abarth | 1.06 |
| 7 | GT +3.0 | 9 | (United Kingdom) P.J. Sargent (private entrant) | (United Kingdom) Peter Sargent (United Kingdom) Peter Lumsden | Jaguar E-Type Coupé | 1.04 |
| 8= | GT +3.0 | 10 | (United States) Briggs Cunningham | (United States) Briggs Cunningham (United Kingdom) Roy Salvadori | Jaguar E-Type Coupé | 1.00 |
| 8= | E 850 | 50 | (France) Société Automobiles René Bonnet | (France) Paul Armagnac (France) Gérard Laureau | Bonnet Djet 2 Spider | 1.00 |

- Note: Only the top nine positions are included in this set of standings.

=== Index of Performance ===
Taken from Moity's book, at odds with Quentin Spurring's book

| Pos | Class | No | Team | Drivers | Chassis | Score |
|---|---|---|---|---|---|---|
| 1 | E 850 | 53 | (France) Panhard & Levassor | (France) André Guilhaudin (France) Alain Bertaut | CD Dyna Coupé | 1.265 |
| 2 | E 850 | 50 | (France) Société Automobiles René Bonnet | (France) Paul Armagnac (France) Gérard Laureau | Bonnet Djet 2 Spider | 1.251 |
| 3 | GT; 1.3 | 44 | (United Kingdom) Team Lotus Engineering | (United Kingdom) David Hobbs (Australia) Frank Gardner | Lotus Elite Mk14 | 1.204 |
| 4 | GT; 3.0 | 19 | (Belgium) P. Noblet (private entrant) | (Belgium) Pierre Noblet (France) Jean Guichet | Ferrari 250 GTO | 1.203 |
| 5 | E +3.0 | 6 | (Italy) SEFAC Ferrari | (Belgium) Olivier Gendebien (United States) Phil Hill | Ferrari 330 TRI/LM | 1.192 |
| 6 | GT; 1.3 | 45 | (United Kingdom) Team Lotus Engineering | (United Kingdom) Clive Hunt (United Kingdom) Dr John ‘Mac’ Wyllie | Lotus Elite Mk14 | 1.169 |
| 7 | GT; 1.3 | 39 | (Italy) Scuderia St. Ambroeus | (Italy) Giancarlo Sala (Italy) Marcello de Luca di Lizzano | Alfa Romeo Giulietta SZ | 1.166 |
| 8 | GT; 3.0 | 22 | (Belgium) Equipe Nationale Belge | (Belgium) “Eldé” (Leon Dernier) (Belgium) “Beurlys” (Jean Blaton) | Ferrari 250 GTO | 1.156 |
| 9 | GT; 1.6 | 34 | (West Germany) Porsche System Engineering | (West Germany) Edgar Barth (West Germany) Hans Herrmann | Porsche 356 B Carrera GTL Abarth | 1.146 |
| 10 | E 1.15 | 46 | (France) Automobiles René Bonnet | (France) Bernard Consten (France) José Rosinski | Bonnet Djet | 1.125 |

- Note: Only the top ten positions are included in this set of standings. A score of 1.00 means meeting the minimum distance for the car, and a higher score is exceeding the nominal target distance.

=== Statistics ===
Taken from Quentin Spurring's book, officially licensed by the ACO

- Fastest Lap in practice – P.Hill, #6 Ferrari 330 TRI/LM – 3m 55.1s; 206.12 km/h (128.08 mph)
- Fastest Lap – P.Hill, #6 Ferrari 330 TRI/LM – 3:57.3secs; 204.20 km/h (126.88 mph)
- Distance – 4,451.25 km (2,765.88 mi)
- Winner's Average Speed – 185.47 km/h (115.25 mph)
- Attendance – 300 000+

=== Challenge Mondial de Vitesse et Endurance Standings ===
| Pos | Manufacturer | Points |
|---|---|---|
| 1 | (Italy) Ferrari | 39 |
| 2 | (West Germany) Porsche | 35 |
| 3 | (Italy) Alfa Romeo | 25 |

Citations
