= Nino Vaccarella =

Italian racing driver (1933–2021)

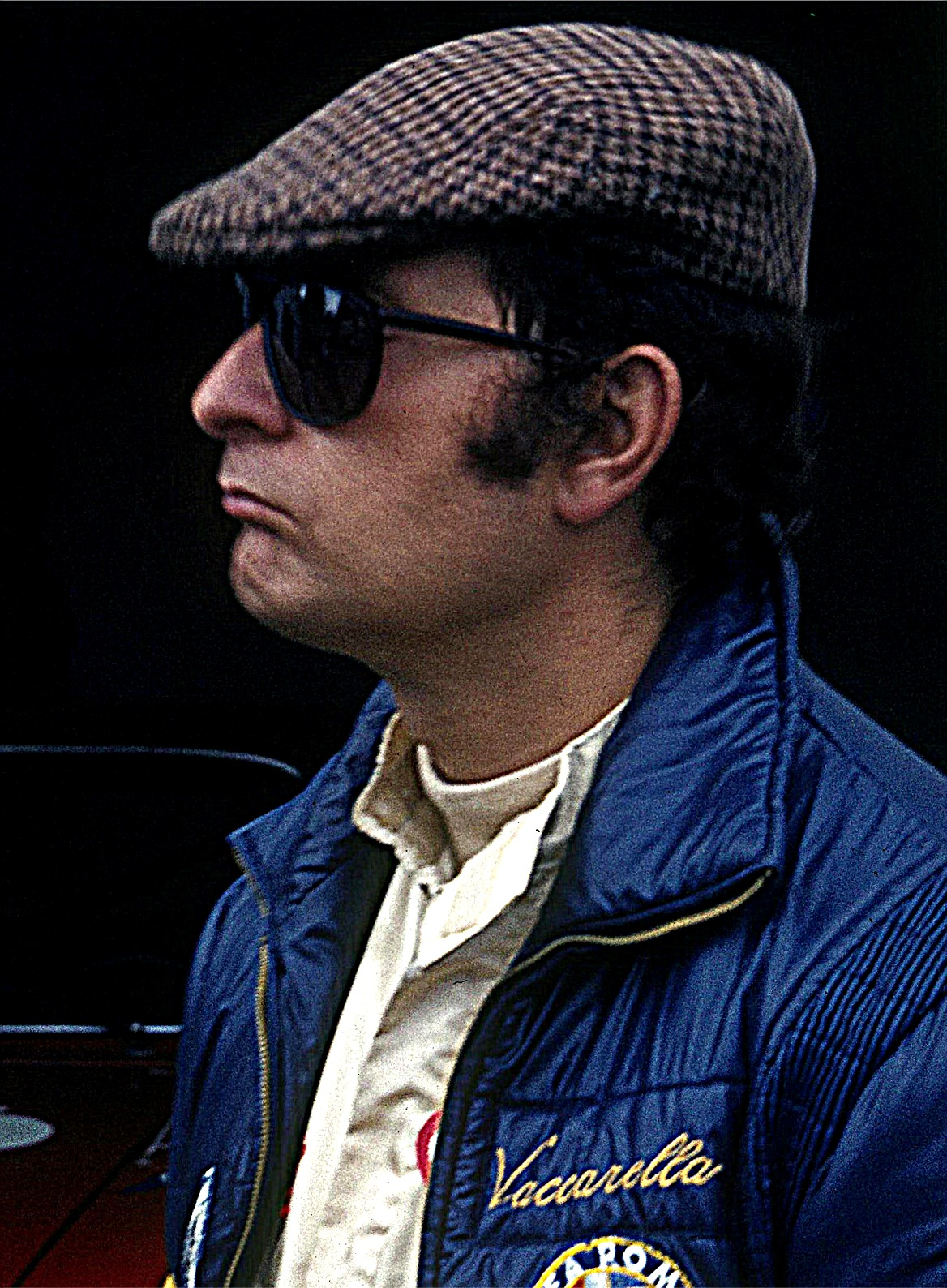
- Vaccarella in 1972
- Born: Antonino Vaccarella; 4 March 1933; Palermo, Sicily, Italy
- Died: 23 September 2021 (aged 88); Palermo, Sicily, Italy

Formula One World Championship career
- Nationality: (Italy) Italian
- Active years: 1961-1962, 1965
- Team(s): Ferrari, non-works De Tomaso, Lotus, Porsche
- Entries: 5 (4 starts)
- Championships: 0
- Wins: 0
- Podiums: 0
- Career points: 0
- Pole positions: 0
- Fastest laps: 0
- First entry: 1961 Italian Grand Prix
- Last entry: 1965 Italian Grand Prix

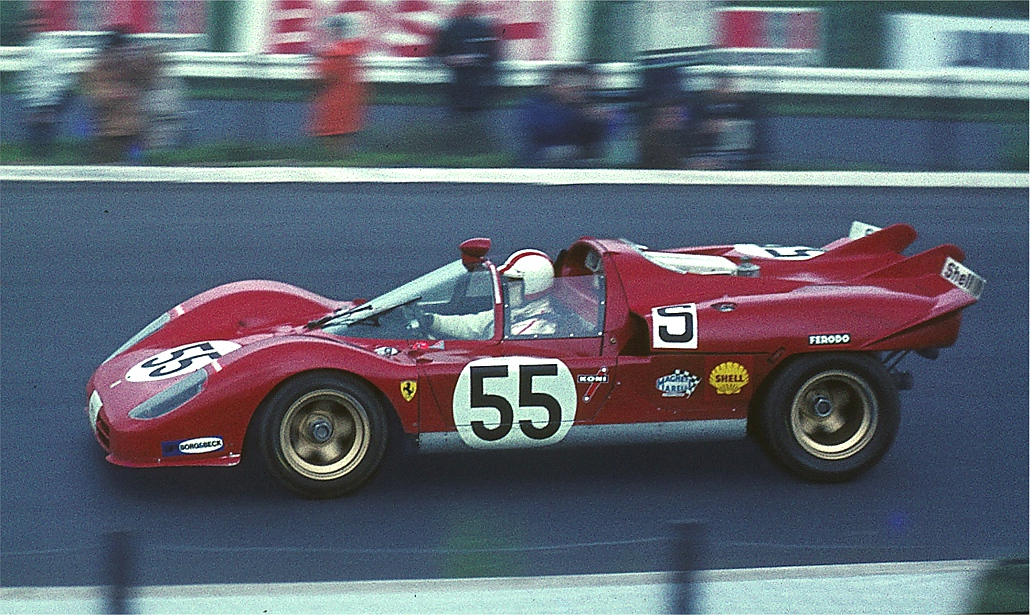
Vaccarella at 1970 1000km Nürburgring with Ferrari 512S.

Antonino Vaccarella (4 March 1933 – 23 September 2021) was an Italian sports car racing and Formula One driver from the island of Sicily. He was considered a specialist for the main local race, the Targa Florio, then the world's oldest automobile race, introduced in 1906. It was run over 72km of mountain roads that were hard to memorize, giving locals an advantage.

Vaccarella was also called "il preside volante" as he was a math teacher and, following the early death of his father, principal of a private Montessori school in Palermo. The principal achievements of the principal include having won the 1964 24 Hours of Le Mans, the Targa Florio in 1965 and the 1970 12 Hours of Sebring with Ferrari. When the Scuderia did not participate at the Targa, like in 1968 and 1969, Vaccarella drove Alfa Romeo Tipo 33. With this brand came his last wins, in 1971, and also in 1975 when the Targa no longer was a World Sportscar Championship event, but a shorter mainly all-Italian event that soon would be discontinued due to safety concerns.

== Sports car career ==
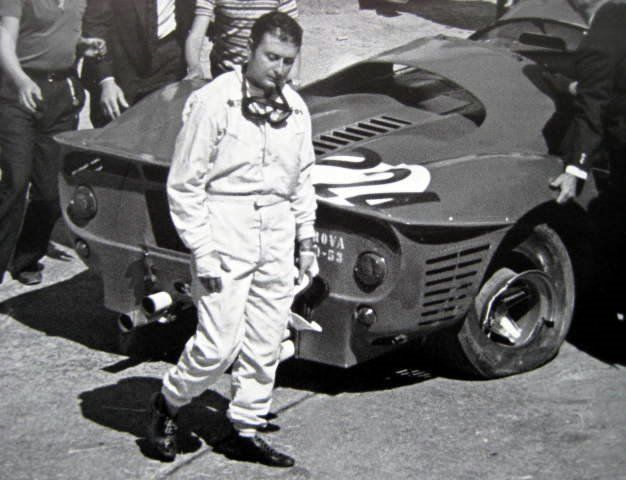
Vaccarella walks away from his damaged Ferrari 330 P3 during the 1967 Targa Florio

Sicily-born Vaccarella was well known for being a Targa Florio specialist. According to Vic Elford "he knew the roads on Sicily like the back of his hand". His first Targa was in 1959 in a privately entered Maserati that finished tenth. The following year, he was teamed with Umberto Maglioli for the 1960 Targa Florio in a birdcage Maserati, which was owned by the Camoradi team. Maglioli had previously won the race twice; Vaccarella was a schoolteacher in Palermo with a great passion for motorsport. They took the lead in the early afternoon on 8 May and maintained it for three laps until the car broke down. The event was won by Joakim Bonnier and Hans Herrmann in a small silver Porsche 718 RS 60.

Vaccarella's participation in this race kickstarted his international racing career. He finished second at the 12 Hours of Sebring in the United States, but during the 1963 Nürburgring 1000km, during practice he crashed a brand-new works-entered Ferrari 250P, broke his arm and was soaked in fuel. He came back to the race a year later to win it with Ludovico Scarfiotti, driving for the factory. He then found even greater success by winning the 24 Hours of Le Mans with Jean Guichet, reaching the pinnacle of sports car racing.

Vaccarella was paired with Lorenzo Bandini in the 1965 Targa Florio when they won with an average speed of 63.7 miles per hour, finishing in 7 hours and 1 minute 12.4 seconds. In 1966, Vaccarella and Bandini led most of the race until Bandini ran their Ferrari 330 ran off the track after seven laps and was too damaged to continue. While waving his hand to acknowledge the crowd, Vaccarella made eye contact with a retaining wall that carried the inscription Viva Nino. Maglioli and Vaccarella drove a Ford GT-40 to fifth place in the 1967 12 Hours of Sebring.

The 8 May 1968 edition of Giornale Di Sicilia proclaimed in its headline, Only Vaccarella Can Bring Off The Miracle, as Ferrari boycotted the whole season due to rule changes. The meaning had to do with the Sicilian driver's great task of gaining victory in the Targa Florio in his 2.5-litre Alfa Romeo Tipo 33. He was up against four German competitors who were driving Porsche 907 models. The Porsches had recently swept the endurance races at Daytona and Sebring. Few experts gave the four Alfa Romeos much of a chance against the flawless Porsches, but Sicilians were trusting the skill of Vaccarella's driving. Vaccarella also found more success by winning the Mugello Grand Prix when it still was on a 38-mile street circuit similar to the Targa in July of that year. Vaccarella qualified eighth for the 1970 24 Hours of Daytona in a Ferrari 512S, and he won Sebring that year after Mario Andretti was put into Vaccarella and Ignazio Giunti's car and put in a stupendous drive to win. He also drove the big V12-powered Ferrari 512S in a heroic yet ultimately losing effort in 1970, damaging the car in the final stages. This was one of a series of 11 endurance events held in Europe and North America for the 1970 world manufacturers championship.

Vaccarella and Toine Hezemans won the 1971 Targa Florio in an Alfa Romeo. They crossed the finish line over a minute ahead of Andrea de Adamich and Gijs van Lennep, who also drove an Alfa Romeo. This race ended the dominance of Porsche, which had finished first in the previous five Targa Florio races but this time only brought three factory cars of which two crashed early, and one late in the race. Vaccarella competed in the 1972 12 Hours of Sebring in one of four Alfa Romeo 33/3TT's to be entered in the event. His driving partner was Nanni Galli. They qualified fifth after another Alfa Romeo of Rolf Stommelen and Peter Revson, who started third.

Vaccarella would win the Targa Florio one more time, in 1975 driving an Alfa Romeo 33TT12- the Targa was no longer part of the World Championship but was an Italian national event. After this, Vaccarella retired from racing. His son Giovanni had been born in 1972 and he wanted to be alive to raise his son in this very dangerous era of motor racing. In a later interview, although he was known as a Targa Florio specialist Vaccarella admitted that he preferred fast circuits like Le Mans, Monza and Spa over slow circuits the Targa, Monaco and the Nürburgring. He also admitted in this interview that Le Mans was his favorite circuit.

== Formula One ==
Vacarella was selected for the 1962 Ferrari Formula One race team by Enzo Ferrari. He was joined by John Surtees, Mike Parkes, Willy Mairesse, Lorenzo Bandini, and Ludovico Scarfiotti. He participated in five World Championship Grands Prix, debuting on 10 September 1961. He scored no championship points. He also participated in several non-Championship Formula One races.

== Racing record ==
=== Complete Formula One World Championship results ===
(key)

Year	Entrant	Chassis	Engine	1	2	3	4	5	6	7	8	9	10	WDC	Points
1961	Scuderia Serenissima	De Tomaso F1	Alfa Romeo Straight-4	MON	NED	BEL	FRA	GBR	GER	ITA; Ret	USA			NC	0
1962	Scuderia SSS Republica di Venezia	Lotus 18/21	Climax Straight-4	NED	MON; DNQ	BEL	FRA	GBR						NC	0
1962	Scuderia SSS Republica di Venezia	Porsche 718	Porsche Flat-4						GER; 15					NC	0
1962	Scuderia SSS Republica di Venezia	Lotus 24	Climax V8							ITA; 9	USA	RSA		NC	0
1965	Scuderia Ferrari SpA SEFAC	Ferrari 158	Ferrari V8	RSA	MON	BEL	FRA	GBR	NED	GER	ITA; 12	USA	MEX	NC	0

=== Non-Championship results ===
(key) (Races in bold indicate pole position) (Races in italics indicate fastest lap)

Year	Entrant	Chassis	Engine	1	2	3	4	5	6	7	8	9	10	11	12	13	14	15	16	17	18	19	20	21
1961	Scuderia Serenissima	De Tomaso F1	Alfa Romeo L4	LOM	GLV	PAU	BRX	VIE	AIN	SYR	NAP	LON	SIL	SOL	KAN	DAN	MOD; DNQ	FLG	OUL	LEW				
1961	Scuderia Serenissima	Cooper T51	Maserati L4																		**VAL**; 3	RAN	NAT	RSA
1962	Scuderia SSS Republica di Venezia	Lotus 18/21	Climax L4	CAP	BRX; DNQ	LOM	LAV	GLV	PAU; 6	AIN	INT; Ret	NAP	MAL	CLP	RMS			MED; Ret	DAN	OUL	MEX	RAN	NAT	
1962	Scuderia SSS Republica di Venezia	Porsche 718	Porsche F4													SOL; WD	KAN							

=== Complete 24 Hours of Le Mans results ===
Year	Team	Co-Drivers	Car	Class	Laps	Pos.	Class Pos.
1961	(Italy) Scuderia Serenissima	(Italy) Ludovico Scarfiotti	Maserati Tipo 63	S 3.0	53	DNF (Engine)	
1962	(Italy) Scuderia SSS Republica di Venezia	(Italy) Giorgio Scarlatti	Ferrari 250 GTO	GT 3.0	172	DNF (Engine)	
1964	(Italy) SpA Ferrari SEFAC	(France) Jean Guichet	Ferrari 275 P	P 5.0	349	**1st**	**1st**
1965	(United States) North American Racing Team	(Mexico) Pedro Rodríguez	Ferrari 365 P2 Spyder	P 5.0	320	7th	**1st**
1966	(Italy) Scuderia San Marco (United States) North American Racing Team	(Italy) Mario Casoni	Dino 206 S	P 2.0	7	DNF (Water leak)	
1967	(Italy) SpA Ferrari SEFAC	(New Zealand) Chris Amon	Ferrari 330 P3 Spyder	P 5.0	105	DNF (Fire)	
1968	(Italy) Autodelta SpA	(Italy) Giancarlo Baghetti	Alfa Romeo T33/2	P 2.0	150	DNF (Fuel pump)	
1969	(France) Equipe Matra - Elf	(France) Jean Guichet	Matra-Simca MS630	P 3.0	359	5th	**3rd**
1970	(Italy) SpA Ferrari SEFAC	(Italy) Ignazio Giunti	Ferrari 512 S	S 5.0	7	DNF (Engine)	
1971	(Spain) Escuderia Montjuich	(Spain) José Juncadella	Ferrari 512 M	S 5.0	186	DNF (Transmission)	
1972	(Italy) Autodelta SpA	(Italy) Andrea de Adamich	Alfa Romeo 33TT3	S 3.0	307	4th	4th

=== Complete 12 Hours of Sebring results ===
Year	Team	Co-Drivers	Car	Class	Laps	Pos.	Class Pos.
1962	(Italy) Scuderia SSS Republica di Venezia	(Italy) Carlo Maria Abate	Maserati Tipo 64	S3.0	16	DNF (Shift linkage)	
1963	(Italy) S.E.F.A.C. Ferrari	(Belgium) Willy Mairesse (Italy) Lorenzo Bandini	Ferrari 250 P	P3.0	208	**2nd**	2nd
1964	(Italy) S.E.F.A.C. Ferrari	(Italy) Ludovico Scarfiotti	Ferrari 275 P	P+3.0	213	**2nd**	2nd
1967	(Italy) Brescia Corse Team	(Italy) Umberto Maglioli	Ford GT40	S5.0	223	5th	1st
1969	(Italy) Autodelta, S.P.A.	(Belgium) Lucien Bianchi	Alfa Romeo T33/3	P3.0	17	DNF (Overheating)	
1970	(Italy) Ferrari S.P.A., S.E.F.A.C.	(Italy) Ignazio Giunti (United States) Mario Andretti	Ferrari 512 S	S5.0	248	**1st**	1st
1971	(Italy) Autodelta, S.P.A.	(Italy) Andrea de Adamich (France) Henri Pescarolo	Alfa Romeo T33/3	P3.0	248	**3rd**	2nd
1971	(Italy) Autodelta, S.P.A.	(Netherlands) Toine Hezemans	Alfa Romeo T33/3	P3.0	27	DNF (Fuel system)	
1972	(Italy) Autodelta, S.P.A.	(Netherlands) Toine Hezemans	Alfa Romeo T33/3	S3.0	233	**3rd**	3rd

=== Complete 24 Hours of Daytona results ===
Year	Team	Co-Drivers	Car	Class	Laps	Pos.	Class Pos.
1968	(Italy) Autodelta, S.P.A.	(Germany) Udo Schütz	Alfa Romeo T33/2	P	617	5th	4th
1970	(Italy) Ferrari S.P.A.	(Italy) Ignazio Giunti	Ferrari 512 S	S	89	DNF (Accident)	

Sporting positions
Preceded by Ludovico Scarfiotti; Lorenzo Bandini	Winner of the 24 Hours of Le Mans; 1964; With: Jean Guichet	Succeeded by Jochen Rindt; Masten Gregory
