= Carlo Maria Abate =

Italian racing driver (1932–2019)

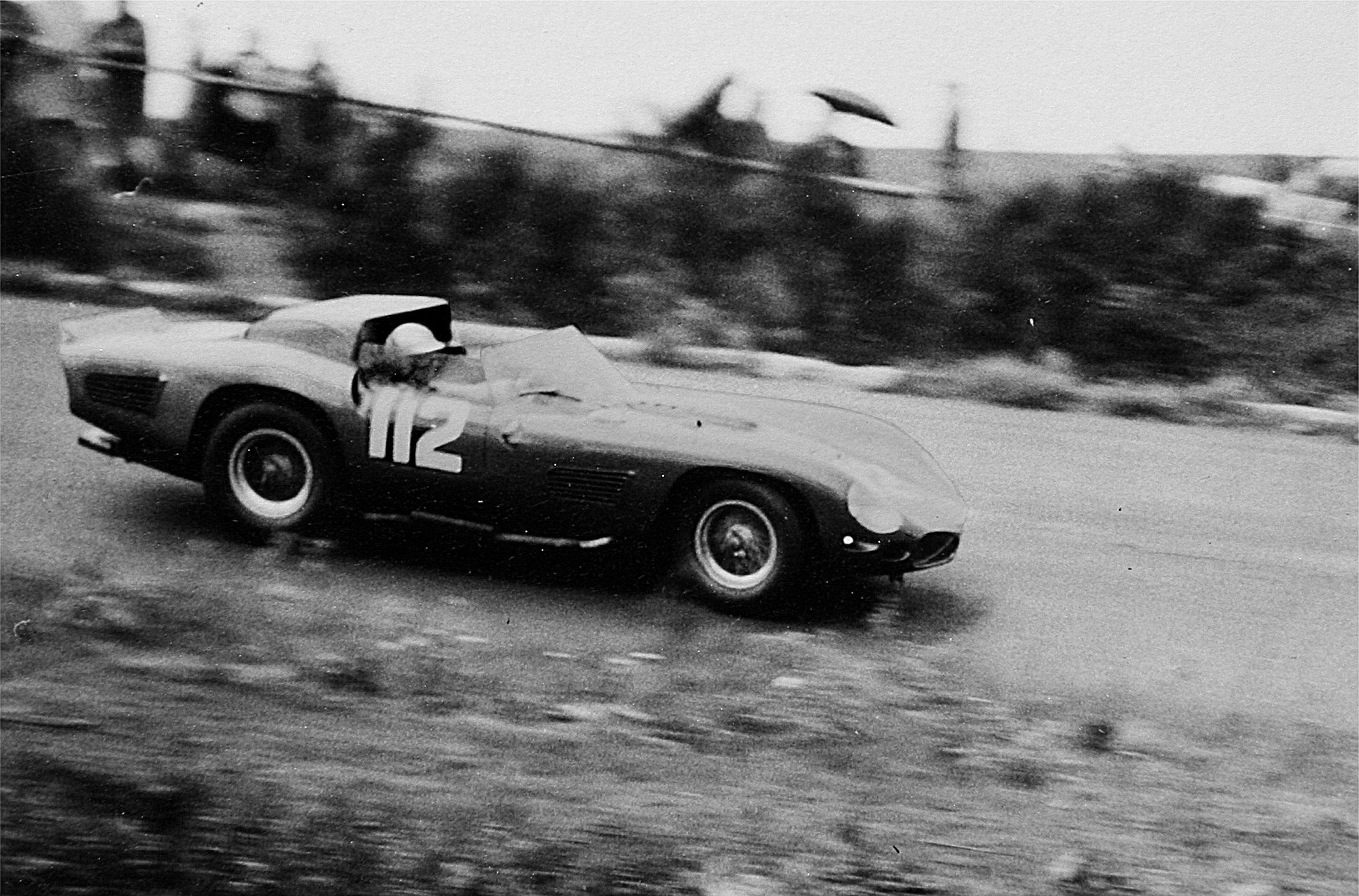
- Born: 10 July 1932; Turin, Kingdom of Italy
- Died: 29 April 2019 (aged 86); Turin, Italy

Formula One World Championship career
- Nationality: (Italy) Italian
- Active years: 1962–1963
- Team(s): non-works Porsche and Lotus
- Entries: 3 (0 starts)
- Championships: 0
- Wins: 0
- Podiums: 0
- Career points: 0
- Pole positions: 0
- Fastest laps: 0

Carlo Maria Abate (10 July 1932 – 29 April 2019) was an Italian auto racing driver. He was one of the best Ferrari 250 GTO specialists. Abate preferred to be addressed as "Carlo Mario Abate" instead of his christened name.

Abate raced mostly for the private Italian team Scuderia Serenissima of Count Giovanni Volpi, but also for Scuderia Centro Sud, Scuderia Ferrari and the Porsche factory team. He won one of the rounds of 1962 World Sportscar Championship: The Trophée d'Auvergne on 15 July 1962.

In 1962, Abate tried participating in Formula One races, entering the 1962 Naples Grand Prix in a Porsche, finishing fourth. After crashing his Lotus 18/21 at his next race at Reims-Gueux, he withdrew his entry to his first World Championship event, the 1962 French Grand Prix, and later also entered and withdrew from 1962 German Grand Prix. He returned to the track for the 1962 Mediterranean Grand Prix, where he came third. The following year, he drove a Scuderia Centro Sud Cooper to fifth place in the 1963 Imola Grand Prix, and came third at the 1963 Syracuse Grand Prix. After withdrawing his entry to the 1963 Italian Grand Prix, he retired from the sport at the end of the year, his greatest year, culminating with a win at the Targa Florio in a factory Porsche with Jo Bonnier. Abate later became the director of a private clinic.

== Career results ==
=== Complete 24 Hours of Le Mans results ===
| Year | Team | Co-Drivers | Car | Class | Laps | Pos. | Class Pos. |
|---|---|---|---|---|---|---|---|
| 1961 | (Italy) Scuderia Serenissima | (France) Maurice Trintignant | Ferrari 250 GT SWB | GT 3.0 | 162 | DNF | DNF |
| 1962 | (Italy) Scuderia SSS Republica di Venezia | (United Kingdom) Colin Davis | Ferrari 250 GT Drogo | E 3.0 | 30 | DNF | DNF |
| 1963 | (Italy) SpA Ferrari SEFAC | (France) Fernand Tavano | Ferrari 250 GTO | GT 3.0 | 105 | DNF | DNF |

=== Formula One World Championship results ===
(key)

| Year | Entrant | Chassis | Engine | 1 | 2 | 3 | 4 | 5 | 6 | 7 | 8 | 9 | 10 | WDC | Points |
|---|---|---|---|---|---|---|---|---|---|---|---|---|---|---|---|
| 1962 | Scuderia SSS Republica di Venezia | Lotus 18/21 | Climax Straight-4 | NED | MON | BEL | FRA; DNP | GBR | GER; DNP | ITA | USA | RSA | | NC | 0 |
| 1963 | Count Volpi | Porsche | Porsche Flat-4 | MON | BEL | NED | FRA | GBR | GER | ITA; DNP | USA | MEX | RSA | NC | 0 |
