= Colin Davis (racing driver) =

British racing driver (1933–2012)

- Born: 29 July 1933; Marylebone, London, England
- Died: 19 December 2012 (aged 79); Oranjezicht, Cape Town, South Africa
- Relatives: Sammy Davis (father)

Formula One World Championship career
- Nationality: (United Kingdom) British
- Active years: 1959
- Team: Non-works Cooper
- Entries: 2
- Championships: 0
- Wins: 0
- Podiums: 0
- Career points: 0
- Pole positions: 0
- Fastest laps: 0
- First entry: 1959 French Grand Prix
- Last entry: 1959 Italian Grand Prix

Colin Charles Houghton Davis (29 July 1933 – 19 December 2012) was a British racing driver from England, who won the 1964 Targa Florio.

== Early life ==
Davis was born in Marylebone, London, the son of "Bentley Boy" and Le Mans winner, Sammy Davis (who later became Autocar magazine's sports editor).

Davis was educated at Stowe School in the late 1930s.

Davis was an advertising executive who raced a 500cc Formula 3 Cooper before moving to Italy from where he conducted his own racing career.

== Racing career ==
Davis competed in two World Championship Formula One Grands Prix, finishing 11th in the 1959 Italian Grand Prix in a Scuderia Centro Sud Cooper-Maserati. He also participated in several non-Championship Formula One races.

Davis finished eighth overall and a class winner in the 1960 Nürburgring 1000km, sharing a Ferrari 250GT with Carlo Abate. In the same race the following year, he finished fourth overall, again with Abate, in a Ferrari 250GT. Also in 1961, Davis finished fifth in the 4-Hours of Pescara, driving solo in a 1,600 c.c. Osca Sport. He shared the winning Porsche 904 GTS in the 1964 Targa Florio with Antonio Pucci.

== Later life ==
After Davis retired from racing, he emigrated to Cape Town and worked as a radio broadcaster. He died on 19 December 2012 after a long illness.

== Racing record ==
=== Complete Formula One World Championship results ===
(key)

Year	Entrant	Chassis	Engine	1	2	3	4	5	6	7	8	9	WDC	Points
1959	Scuderia Centro Sud	Cooper T51	Maserati	MON	500	NED	FRA; Ret	GBR	GER	POR	ITA; 11	USA	NC	0

=== Complete 24 Hours of Le Mans results ===
Year	Team	Co-Drivers	Car	Class	Laps	Pos.	Class Pos.
1958	(Italy) Automobili OSCA	(Argentina) Alejandro de Tomaso	O.S.C.A. 750S	S750	252	10th	1st
1959	(Argentina) A. de Tomaso (private entrant)	(Argentina) Alejandro de Tomaso	D.B. HBR-5 Spyder	GT750	63	DNF (Gearbox)	
1961	(Italy) Automobili OSCA	(France) Jean Laroche	O.S.C.A. Sport 750	S850	85	DNF (Overheating)	
1962	(Italy) Scuderia SSS Republica di Venezia	(Italy) Carlo Maria Abate	Ferrari 250 GT Drogo	E3.0	30	DNF (Prop shaft)	
1964	(Germany) Porsche System Engineering	(Germany) Gerhard Mitter	Porsche 904/8	P2.0	244	DNF (Clutch)	
1965	(Germany) Porsche System Engineering	(Germany) Gerhard Mitter	Porsche 904/8	P2.0	20	DNF (Clutch)	
1966	(Germany) Porsche System Engineering	(Switzerland) Jo Siffert	Porsche 906/6 LH	P2.0	339	4th	1st

=== Complete 12 Hours of Sebring results ===
Year	Team	Co-Drivers	Car	Class	Laps	Pos.	Class Pos.
1962	(Italy) Scuderia SSS Republica di Venezia	(France) Fernand Tavano	Ferrari 250 GT	GT3.0	119	DNF (Engine)	

== See also ==
- 1966 24 Hours of Le Mans
- O.S.C.A.
- S. C. H. "Sammy" Davis
