= Scuderia Serenissima =

Italian auto racing team

(Italy) Scuderia Serenissima
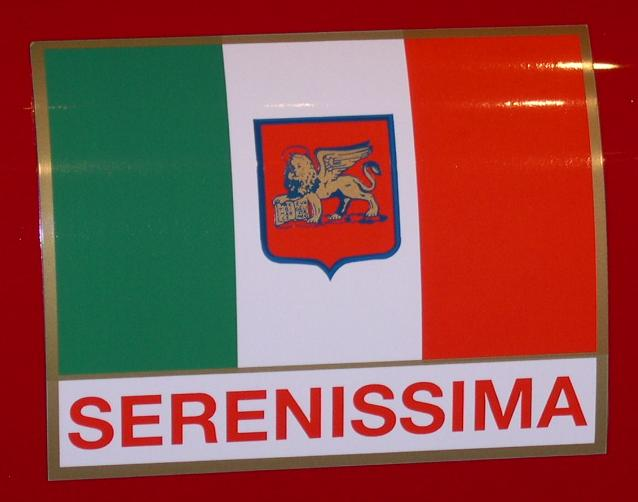
- Full name: Scuderia Serenissima Scuderia SSS Republica di Venezia
- Base: Italy
- Founder(s): Giovanni Volpi
- Noted drivers: (France) Maurice Trintignant (Italy) Giorgio Scarlatti (Italy) Nino Vaccarella

Formula One World Championship career
- First entry: 1961 Monaco Grand Prix
- Races entered: 8
- Drivers' Championships: 0
- Race victories: 0
- Pole positions: 0
- Fastest laps: 0
- Final entry: 1962 Italian Grand Prix

Serenissima as a Formula One engine manufacturer
Formula One World Championship career
- First entry: 1966 Belgian Grand Prix
- Last entry: 1966 Dutch Grand Prix
- Races entered: 3 (1 start)
- Chassis: McLaren
- Constructors' Championships: 0
- Drivers' Championships: 0
- Race victories: 0
- Podiums: 0
- Points: 1
- Pole positions: 0
- Fastest laps: 0

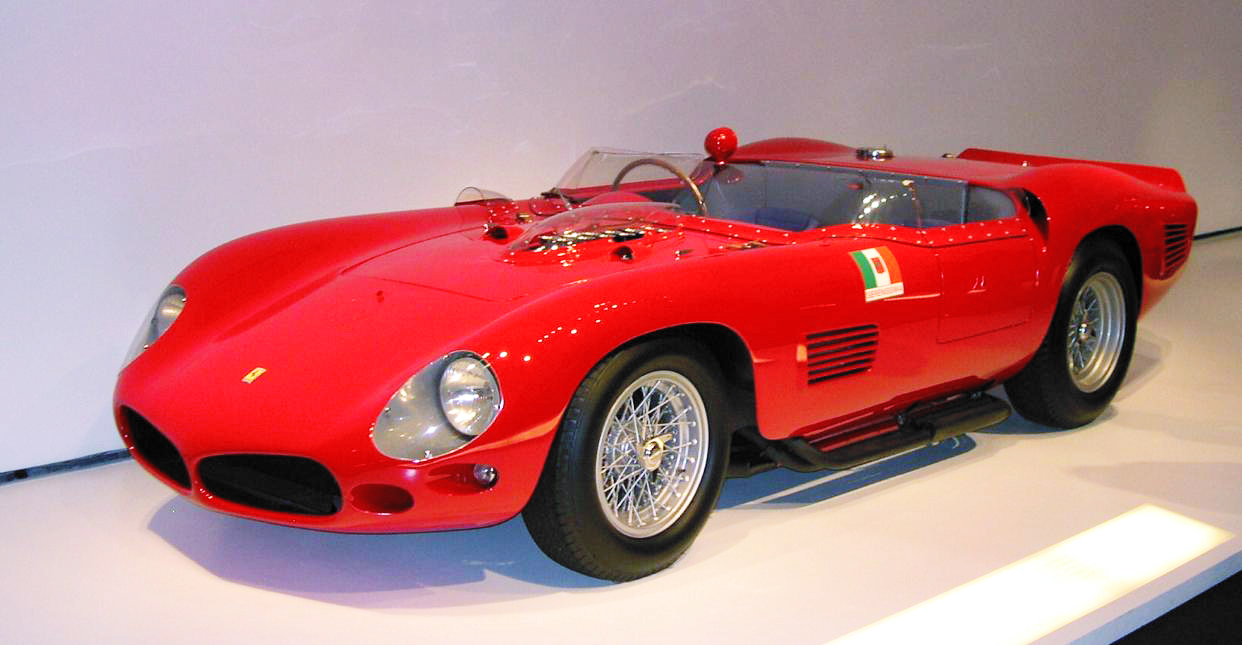
1961 Ferrari 250 TR modified by Giotto Bizzarrini for Volpi's Scuderia Serenissima

Scuderia Serenissima or Scuderia SSS Republica di Venezia was an auto racing team funded by Giovanni Volpi and active in the early 1960s. The name "Serenissima" ("Most Serene") refers to one of the many definitions the city of Venice is known for, the Volpi family being originally from the area. Based in Sasso Marconi, close to Bologna, Serenissima mostly competed in Formula One and sports car racing. Originally the team had an engine supply agreement with Ferrari. When Volpi decided to financially support ATS, a Formula One team put together by Carlo Chiti, Giotto Bizzarrini, Romolo Tavoni and other breakaway Ferrari employees, Enzo Ferrari withdrew from the agreement. Serenissima subsequently turned to De Tomaso and Maserati without much success. Serenissima officially closed in 1970.

== Formula One ==
Scuderia Serenissima made its debut in the 1961 Formula One World Championship. The team first entered a Cooper T51 for Maurice Trintignant at the 1961 Monaco Grand Prix, where he finished seventh.

In Belgium, Trintignant retired after 23 laps with a broken gearbox after having qualified his car in 19th place. At the 1961 French Grand Prix, Scuderia Serenissima entered two cars – a Cooper for Trintignant and a De Tomaso for Giorgio Scarlatti. Trintignant finished in 13th place while Scarlatti retired on lap 15 when his engine broke down. At the German Grand Prix Trintignant retired on lap 12 when his engine broke down. In the 1961 Italian Grand Prix, the team again entered two cars, the Cooper for Trintignant and the De Tomaso for Nino Vaccarella. Trintignant finished the race in ninth place and Vaccarella retired on lap 13 when a failed engine.

For the following season, the team, now called Scuderia SSS Republica di Venezia, entered a car for Nino Vaccarella. In Monaco, Vaccarella failed to qualify for the race. Three races later in Germany, Vaccarella finished in 15th place. The last Formula One race for the team was at Monza in Italy, where Vaccarella finished in 9th place.

Serenissima resurfaced in 1966 as engine supplier for McLaren. At the 1966 British Grand Prix Bruce McLaren finished in sixth place, scoring one World Championship point.

== Sports car racing ==
Serenissima entered the 1962 24 Hours of Le Mans with two Ferrari 250s, one driven by Joakim Bonnier and Dan Gurney, and one by Carlo Maria Abate and Colin Davis. Both cars retired after 4 hours with gearbox problems. In the same year, the team won the Sebring 12 Hours with Bonnier and Lucien Bianchi.

In 1963, Volpi began developing his own prototype GT car, the Jungla GT. It used a new V8 engine, designed by Alberto Massimino, with closed bodywork by Francesco Salomone (built by Gran Sport). A later open version was built by Medardo Fantuzzi.

In 1966 Serenissima joined forces with Luigi Chinetti's North American Racing Team and fielded one car at the 24 Hours of Le Mans driven by Vaccarella and Mario Casoni. The car retired after three hours with a water leak. A second car driven by gentleman driver Louis Corbero failed to qualify.

In 1968, Volpi got interested in the idea of building a proper GT car with the help of Alejandro de Tomaso's Ghia Studios. The Ghia coupe, designed by Tom Tjaarda and Giorgetto Giugiaro, was originally fitted with a Massimino 3.5-litre V8 engine but later switched to a 3.0L Alf Francis M176 V8. At the 2019 Retromobile Show the car was auctioned for $504,053.

== Complete Formula One World Championship results ==
=== As a constructor ===
(key)

Year	Chassis	Engine	Tyres	Driver/s	1	2	3	4	5	6	7	8	9
1961	Cooper T51	Maserati 6-1500 1.5 L4	D		MON	NED	BEL	FRA	GBR	GER	ITA	USA	
1961	Cooper T51	Maserati 6-1500 1.5 L4	D	(France) Maurice Trintignant	7		Ret	13		Ret	9		
1961	De Tomaso F1/001	OSCA 372 1.5 L4	D	(Italy) Giorgio Scarlatti				Ret					
1961	De Tomaso F1/003	Alfa Romeo Giulietta 1.5 L4	D	(Italy) Nino Vaccarella							Ret		
1962	Lotus 18/21	Climax FPF 1.5 L4	D		NED	MON	BEL	FRA	GBR	GER	ITA	USA	RSA
1962	Lotus 18/21	Climax FPF 1.5 L4	D	(Italy) Nino Vaccarella		DNQ							
1962	Porsche 718	Porsche 547/3 1.5 F4	D	(Italy) Nino Vaccarella						15			
1962	Lotus 24	Climax FWMV 1.5 V8	D	(Italy) Nino Vaccarella							9		

=== As an engine supplier ===
(key)

Year	Entrant	Chassis	Engine	Tyres	Drivers	1	2	3	4	5	6	7	8	9	WCC	Points
1966	Bruce McLaren Motor Racing	McLaren M2B	Serenissima M166 3.0 V8	F		MON	BEL	FRA	GBR	NED	GER	ITA	USA	MEX	12th	1
1966	Bruce McLaren Motor Racing	McLaren M2B	Serenissima M166 3.0 V8	F	(New Zealand) Bruce McLaren		DNS		6	DNS					12th	1

== Bibliography ==
- Michael John Lazzari - Giovanni Faoro. Scuderia Serenissima, Cove Edition, 2018, ISBN 978-88-940667-1-5
