= Giovanni Volpi =

Italian-Algerian nobleman and former automobile racing manager

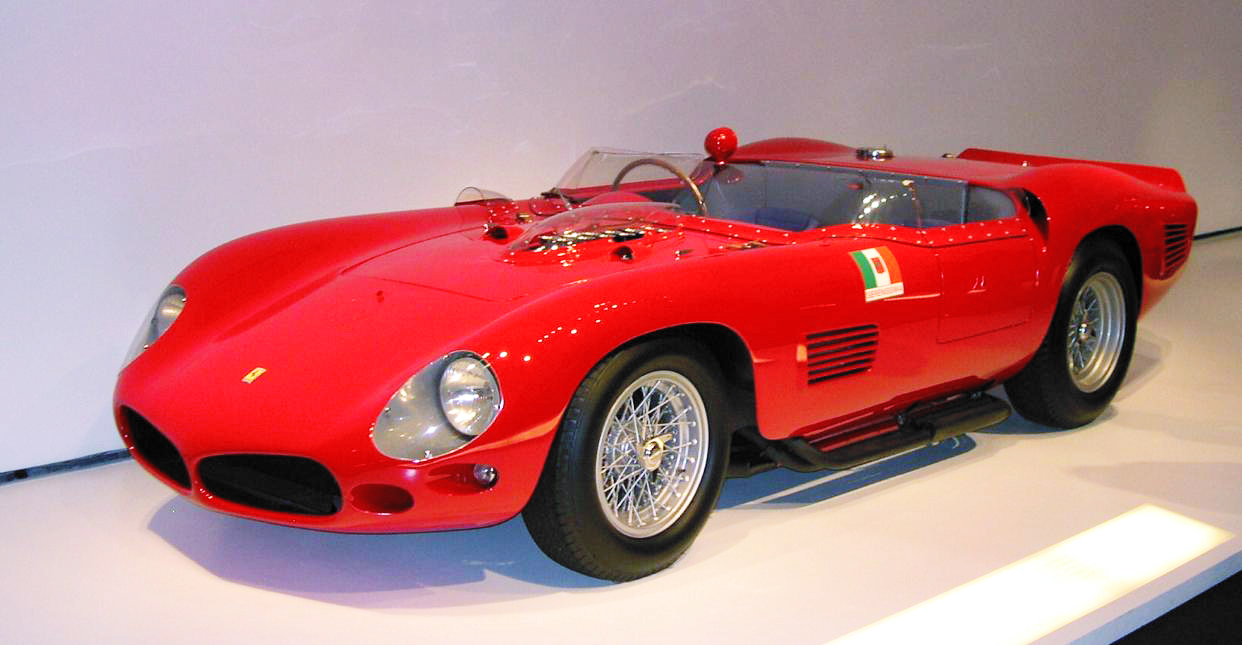
1961 Ferrari 250 TR modified by Giotto Bizzarrini for Volpi's Scuderia Serenissima

Count Giovanni Volpi di Misurata (born 1938 in Venice, Kingdom of Italy) is an Italian-Algerian nobleman and a former automobile racing manager and Formula One team owner. He inherited a fortune, at the age of 24, from his father, Count Giuseppe Volpi di Misurata, a politician, financier and founder of the renowned Venice Film Festival. During World War II, Giovanni Volpi's father served in Benito Mussolini's cabinet as the minister of Finance and one of his chief advisors. He designed several of Mussolini's austerity measures and escaped prosecution after the war. His father also acquired and restored Villa Barbaro at Maser, Italy, built originally for the Barbaro family. Giovanni Volpi is the son of Giuseppe and his second wife, Nathalie El Kanoni.

Giovanni Volpi founded a racing team, Scuderia Serenissima, in 1961 and quickly became one of Ferrari's best customers. In 1962, Scuderia Serenissima commissioned to Piero Drogo and Giotto Bizzarrini the design of the Ferrari 250 GT Drogo, also known as Ferrari Breadvan. At the end of the year, when a group of senior figures, including Bizzarrini and Carlo Chiti, left Ferrari to join Volpi and founded ATS, Volpi's relationship with Enzo Ferrari cooled. Ferrari consequently refused to sell Volpi two 250 GTOs he requested for his GT team.

Following a disastrous 1963 Formula One campaign, where drivers Phil Hill and Giancarlo Baghetti both failed to score championship points, ATS closed. Volpi subsequently continued with the Serenissima marque. Bruce McLaren used a Serenissima engine for a few Grands Prix in 1966.

Volpi is married to Dominique Rizzo and lives in Geneva.
