= Cooper T60 =

Formula One race car

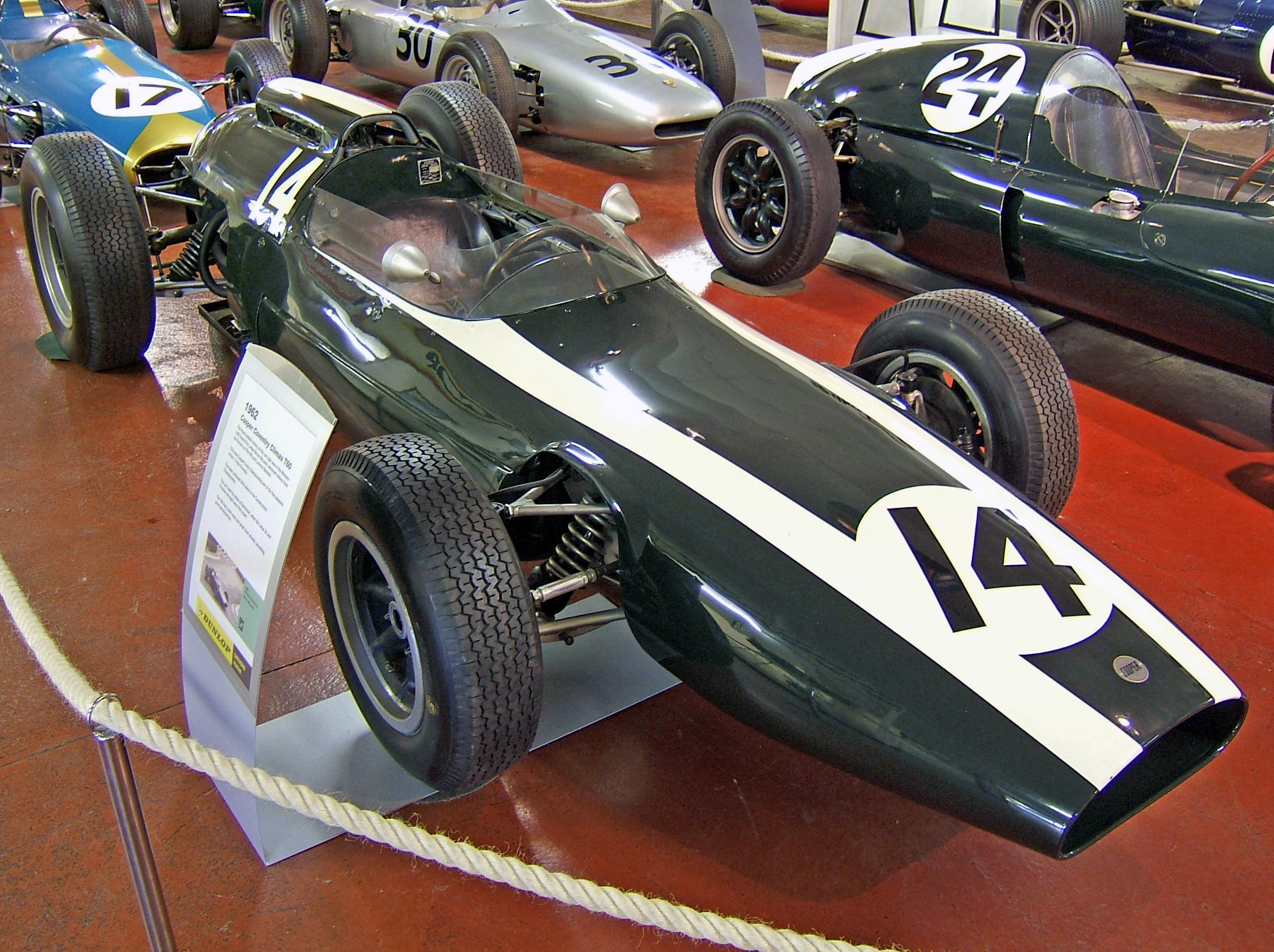
- Category: Formula One
- Constructor: Cooper Car Company
- Designer: Owen Maddock
- Predecessor: Cooper T58
- Successor: Cooper T66

Technical specifications
- Chassis: Steel spaceframe
- Suspension (front): Double wishbone, coil spring and damper
- Suspension (rear): Double wishbone, coil spring and damper
- Axle track: F: 1,308 mm (51.5 in); R: 1,283 mm (50.5 in)
- Wheelbase: 2,311 mm (91.0 in)
- Engine: Coventry Climax FWMV 1.5-litre V8, naturally aspirated, rear mid, longitudinally mounted.
- Transmission: Cooper 6-speed manual gearbox.
- Tyres: Dunlop

Competition history
- Notable entrants: Cooper Car Company; R.R.C. Walker Racing Team
- Notable drivers: (New Zealand) Bruce McLaren (South Africa) Tony Maggs (Sweden) Jo Bonnier
- Debut: 1962 Dutch Grand Prix
Races	Wins	Podiums	F/Laps
17	1	7	1

The Cooper T60 is a Formula One racing car from the Cooper Car Company, which was in use from 1962 to 1965. It won a single World Championship Grand Prix, the 1962 Monaco Grand Prix, driven by Bruce McLaren.

== Development history ==
The Cooper T60 was the Cooper Car Company's entry for the 1962 Formula One season. It was the first Cooper designed specifically to use the Climax FWMV 1.5 litre V8. The chassis consisted of a steel tubular frame with aluminium bodywork. The front and rear suspension had double wishbones and coil springs. The engine was mated to Cooper's own 6-speed gearbox.

The first test drives were not very promising. In addition to constant problems with the response of the engine, there was gearbox damage. These technical defects were largely eliminated by the start of the season. In retrospect, the T60 is described in many publications, if not as a faulty design, then at least as a less-than-successful car. This assumption is not confirmed by the results of the 1962 works team, which won the Monaco Grand Prix and took third place in the constructors' championship.

== Racing history ==
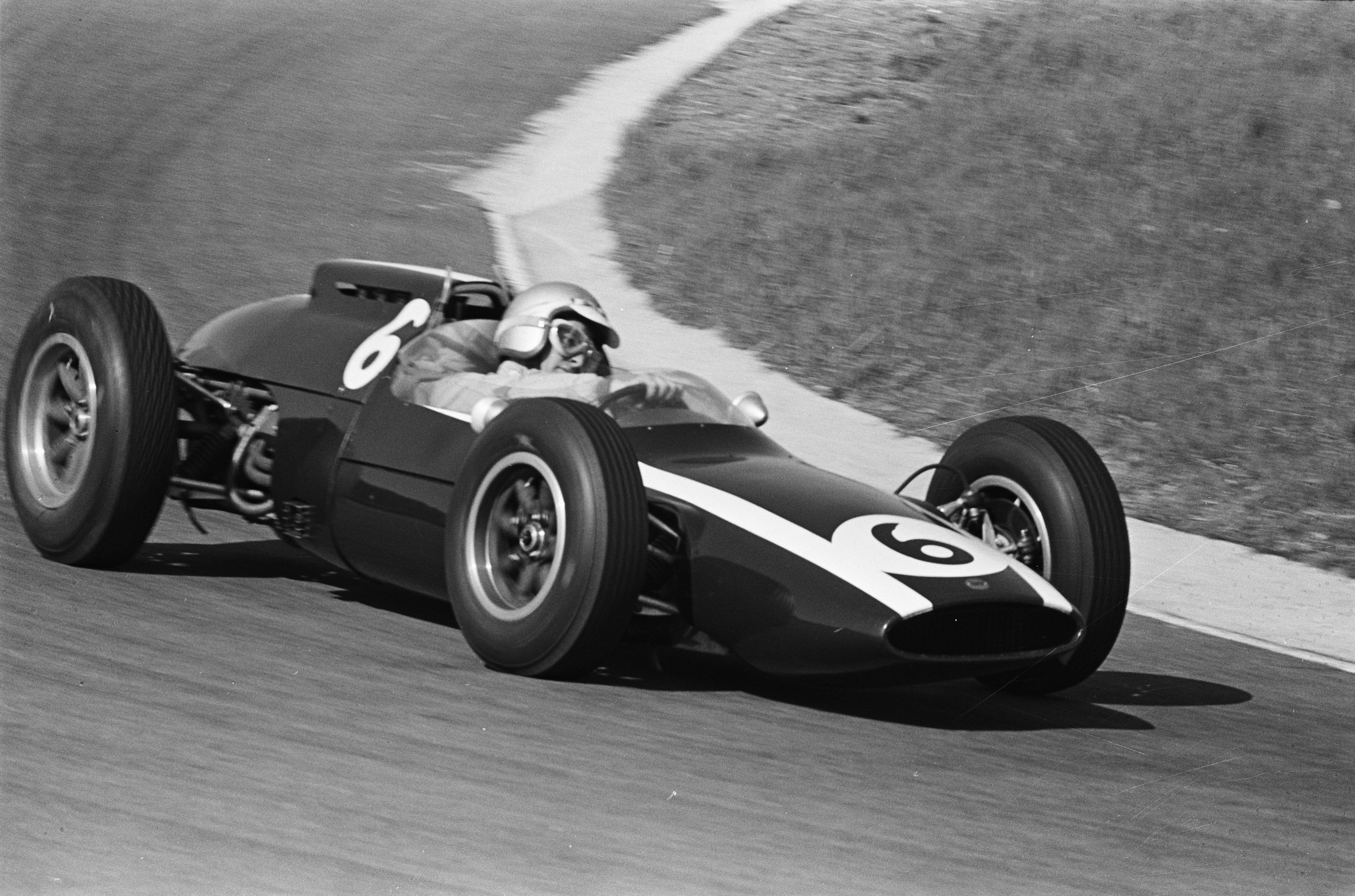
Bruce McLaren at the 1962 Dutch Grand Prix.

Cooper raced the T60 for the first time at the 1962 Dutch Grand Prix in Zandvoort, with Bruce McLaren at the wheel. In practice, the New Zealander qualified for fifth place on the grid and thus proved the competitiveness of the new design. In the race, McLaren drove the fifth lap with a time of 1:34.4 - corresponding to an average of 159.903 km/h (99.359 mph) - which was the fastest lap of the race. Gearbox problems led to his retiral. At the Monaco Grand Prix, McLaren qualified third on the grid and led the field for six laps before being overtaken by the BRM of Graham Hill. However Hill's engine failed eight laps from the finish and McLaren took the win.

From the Belgian Grand Prix onwards, Cooper had a T60 available for both McLaren and Tony Maggs. After a double retirement in Belgium, Maggs drove his T60 to second place at the French Grand Prix while McLaren finished fourth.

More successful races and podium placements followed. McLaren finished third in the British Grand Prix, fifth in Germany, another two thirds in Italy and the United States, and finished the season with second place in South Africa. Maggs was less successful, his only points finishes were sixth in the British Grand Prix and third in South Africa. McLaren ended 1962 with third place in the drivers' championship and Cooper with third in the constructors' championship.

McLaren also won the non-championship 1962 Reims Grand Prix.

The South African Grand Prix was the last works outing of the T60, which was sold to private teams after the season ended, with Cooper introducing the T66 as its replacement.

In 1963, Jo Bonnier competed in the first four World Championship races with Rob Walker's T60. Bonnier's best finish was fifth in the Belgian Grand Prix. Scuderia Centro Sud entered their T60 for Mário de Araújo Cabral at the German Grand Prix where he retired with gearbox problems, and at the Italian Grand Prix where he failed to qualify.

The T60's last races were at the 1964 Italian Grand Prix and the 1965 British Grand Prix. In Monza in 1964 the Swiss Jean-Claude Rudaz was able to qualify a private T60 for the race; however, he was unable to participate after an engine failure on Sunday morning. In 1965, Bob Gerard Racing entered the car for John Rhodes; he retired with ignition failure on the 38th lap.

=== World Championship results ===
(key) (results in bold indicate pole position; results in italics indicate fastest lap)

Year	Entrant	Engine	Driver	1	2	3	4	5	6	7	8	9	10	Points	WCC
1962	Cooper Car Company	Climax FWMV 1.5 V8		NED	MON	BEL	FRA	GBR	GER	ITA	USA	RSA		**29 (37)**^{1}	**3rd**
1962	Cooper Car Company	Climax FWMV 1.5 V8	Bruce McLaren	Ret	1	Ret	4	3	5	3	3	2		**29 (37)**^{1}	**3rd**
1962	Cooper Car Company	Climax FWMV 1.5 V8	Tony Maggs			Ret	2	6		7	7	3		**29 (37)**^{1}	**3rd**
1963	R.R.C. Walker Racing Team	Climax FWMV 1.5 V8		MON	BEL	NED	FRA	GBR	GER	ITA	USA	MEX	RSA	25 (26)^{2}	5th
1963	R.R.C. Walker Racing Team	Climax FWMV 1.5 V8	Jo Bonnier	7	5	11	NC							25 (26)^{2}	5th
1963	Scuderia Centro Sud	Climax FWMV 1.5 V8	Mário de Araújo Cabral						Ret	DNQ				25 (26)^{2}	5th
1964	Fabre Urbain	Climax FWMV 1.5 V8		MON	NED	BEL	FRA	GBR	GER	AUT	ITA	USA	MEX	16	5th
1964	Fabre Urbain	Climax FWMV 1.5 V8	Jean-Claude Rudaz								DNS			16	5th
1965	Bob Gerard Racing	Climax FWMV 1.5 V8		RSA	MON	BEL	FRA	GBR	NED	GER	ITA	USA	MEX	14	5th
1965	Bob Gerard Racing	Climax FWMV 1.5 V8	John Rhodes					Ret						14	5th

^{1}Includes two points scored by Cooper T55
^{2}All but two points scored by other Cooper models

=== Non-Championship Results ===
(key)

Year	Entrant	Engine	Driver	1	2	3	4	5	6	7	8	9	10	11	12	13	14	15	16	17	18	19	20	21	22
1962	Cooper Car Company	Climax FWMV 1.5 V8		CAP	NZL	BRX	LOM	LAV	GLV	PAU	AIN	INT	NAP	MAL	CLP	RMS	SOL	KAN	MED	DAN	OUL	MEX	AUS	RAN	NAT
1962	Cooper Car Company	Climax FWMV 1.5 V8	Bruce McLaren													1					Ret	Ret			
1963	Cooper Car Company	Climax FWMV 1.5 V8		NZL	AUS	LOM	GLV	PAU	IMO	SYR	AIN	INT	ROM	SOL	KAN	MED	AUT	OUL	RAN						
1963	Cooper Car Company	Climax FWMV 1.5 V8	Bruce McLaren			4																			
1963	Cooper Car Company	Climax FWMV 1.5 V8	Tony Maggs								Ret														
1963	R.R.C. Walker Racing Team	Climax FWMV 1.5 V8	Jo Bonnier					Ret	Ret			5		9		4	Ret								
1963	Scuderia Centro Sud	Climax FWMV 1.5 V8	Mário de Araújo Cabral													7									
1964	Fabré Urbain	Climax FWMV 1.5 V8		DMT	NWT	SYR	AIN	INT	SOL	MED	RAN														
1964	Fabré Urbain	Climax FWMV 1.5 V8	Jean-Claude Rudaz			Ret	DNS	14		DNS															
1964	Bob Gerard Racing	Climax FWMV 1.5 V8	John Taylor							7															
1965	Bob Gerard Racing	Climax FWMV 1.5 V8		CSE	ROC	SYR	SMT	INT	MED	RAN															
1965	Bob Gerard Racing	Climax FWMV 1.5 V8	John Taylor		8		7	11																	
1965	Bob Gerard Racing	Climax FWMV 1.5 V8	John Rhodes						8																
