= Cooper T66 =

Formula One race car

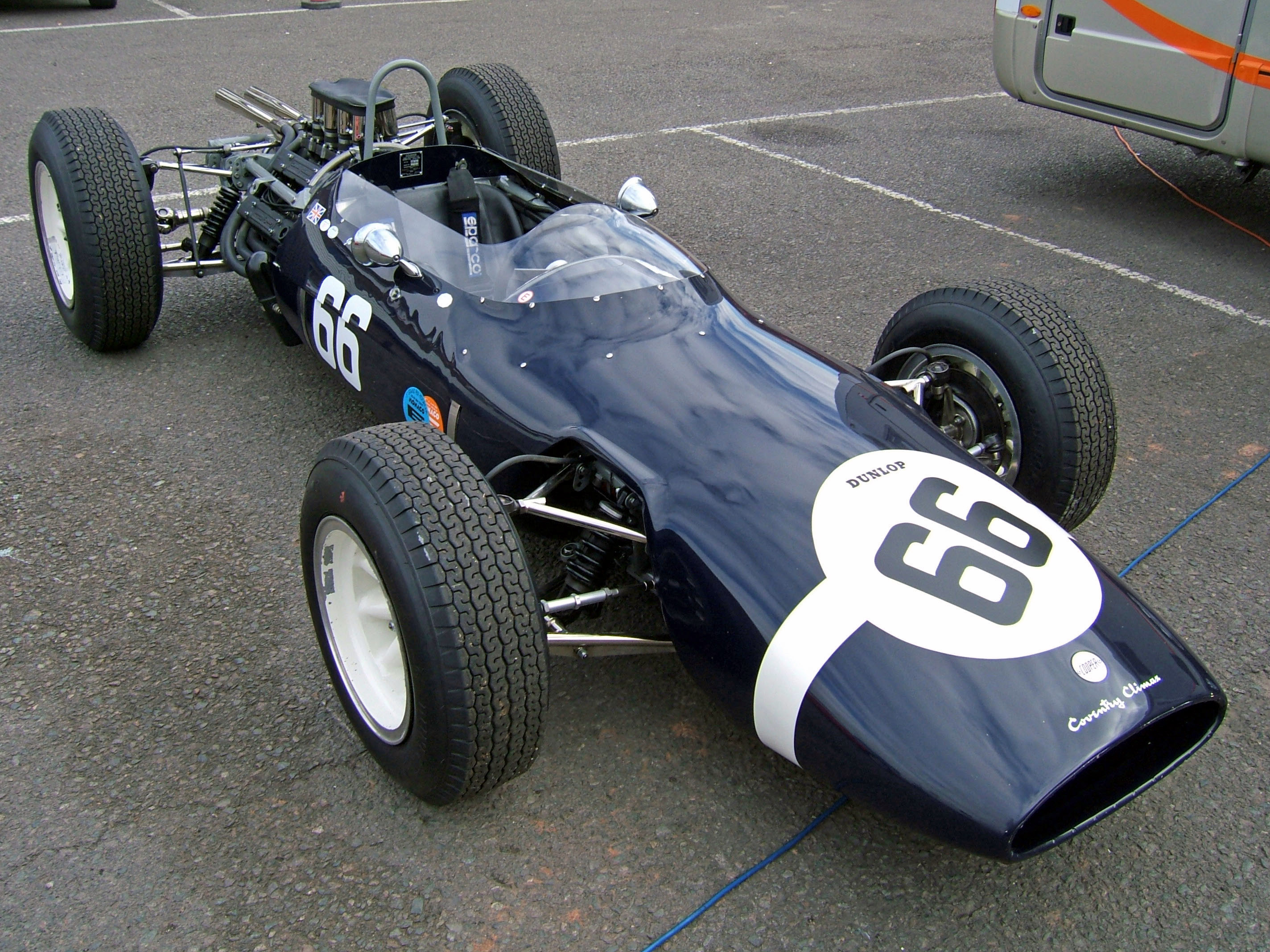
- Category: Formula One
- Constructor: Cooper Car Company
- Designer(s): Owen Maddock
- Predecessor: Cooper T60
- Successor: Cooper T73

Technical specifications
- Chassis: Steel spaceframe
- Suspension (front): Double wishbone, coil spring and damper
- Suspension (rear): Double wishbone, coil spring and damper
- Axle track: F: 1,308 mm (51.5 in); R: 1,283 mm (50.5 in)
- Wheelbase: 2,311 mm (91.0 in)
- Engine: Coventry Climax FWMV 1.5-litre V8, naturally aspirated, rear mid, longitudinally mounted.
- Transmission: Cooper 6-speed manual gearbox.
- Tyres: Dunlop

Competition history
- Notable entrants: Cooper Car Company; R.R.C. Walker Racing Team
- Notable drivers: (New Zealand) Bruce McLaren (South Africa) Tony Maggs (Sweden) Jo Bonnier
- Debut: 1963 Monaco Grand Prix
Races	Wins	Podiums	F/Laps
13	0	4	0

The Cooper T66 is a Formula One racing car from the Cooper Car Company, which was in use from 1963 to 1964.

== Development history ==
The Cooper T66 was the Cooper Car Company's entry for the 1963 Formula One season and was a development of the previous year's T60, with lead driver Bruce McLaren providing significant input to the design. The chassis again consisted of a steel tubular frame but with steel panels welded to the underside to provide additional stiffening, and was clad with aluminium bodywork. Overall the car was slimmer than the T60. The front and rear suspension had double wishbones and coil springs but with revised geometry to correct the T60's tendency to nose-dive under braking. The Climax FWMV V8 engine was mated to Cooper's own 6-speed gearbox.

== Racing history ==
Cooper raced the T66 for the first time at the 1963 Monaco Grand Prix, driven by Bruce McLaren and Tony Maggs. Neither car qualified well, and McLaren finished third with Maggs in fifth place. He followed up with second at a rain-soaked Spa, but the rest of the season was less encouraging, McLaren managing no better than another third place at Monza. Maggs finished second in France but suffered from retirements and at the end of the season McLaren was sixth in the World Championship with only 17 points and Maggs was eighth, with Cooper fifth in the Constructors' Championship. McLaren also had second place finishes in the non-championship races, the Glover Trophy and the BRDC International Trophy.

Cooper introduced the T71 for the 1964 season but the T66 made a couple of appearances with the last works appearance being at the 1964 Austrian Grand Prix in the hands of Phil Hill who had replaced Maggs as McLaren's teammate.

Also for 1963, Rob Walker purchased a T66 for Jo Bonnier to drive but problems delayed its race debut until the British Grand Prix. The car was even less successful than the works cars, with Bonnier's best result being fifth. The Walker car continued into 1964, but mostly as a spare, and its last race was at the German Grand Prix, driven by Edgar Barth.

One of the works cars was used for several years in the Tasman Series while the Walker car was fitted with a 4.7 litre Shelby Cobra Ford V8 and driven in various Formula Libre and Formula 5000 events, scoring several wins in the Libre class.

=== World Championship results ===
(key) (results in bold indicate pole position; results in italics indicate fastest lap)

Year	Entrant	Engine	Driver	1	2	3	4	5	6	7	8	9	10	Points	WCC
1963	Cooper Car Company	Climax FWMV 1.5 V8		MON	BEL	NED	FRA	GBR	GER	ITA	USA	MEX	RSA	25 (26)^{1}	5th
1963	Cooper Car Company	Climax FWMV 1.5 V8	Bruce McLaren	3	2	Ret	12	Ret	Ret	3	11	Ret	4	25 (26)^{1}	5th
1963	Cooper Car Company	Climax FWMV 1.5 V8	Tony Maggs	5	7	Ret	2	9	Ret	6	Ret	Ret	7	25 (26)^{1}	5th
1963	R.R.C. Walker Racing Team	Climax FWMV 1.5 V8	Jo Bonnier					Ret	6	7	8	5	6	25 (26)^{1}	5th
1964	Cooper Car Company	Climax FWMV 1.5 V8		MON	NED	BEL	FRA	GBR	GER	AUT	ITA	USA	MEX	16	5th
1964	Cooper Car Company	Climax FWMV 1.5 V8	Bruce McLaren	Ret										16	5th
1964	Cooper Car Company	Climax FWMV 1.5 V8	Phil Hill							Ret				16	5th
1964	R.R.C. Walker Racing Team	Climax FWMV 1.5 V8	Jo Bonnier	5										16	5th
1964	R.R.C. Walker Racing Team	Climax FWMV 1.5 V8	Edgar Barth						Ret					16	5th

^{1}Two points scored by Cooper T60

=== Non-Championship Results ===
(key)

Year	Entrant	Engine	Driver	1	2	3	4	5	6	7	8	9	10	11	12	13	14	15	16
1963	Cooper Car Company	Climax FWMV 1.5 V8		NZL	AUS	LOM	GLV	PAU	IMO	SYR	AIN	INT	ROM	SOL	KAN	MED	AUT	OUL	RAN
1963	Cooper Car Company	Climax FWMV 1.5 V8	Bruce McLaren				2				5	2						6	
1963	Cooper Car Company	Climax FWMV 1.5 V8	Tony Maggs				3				Ret	6						5	
1963	R.R.C. Walker Racing Team	Climax FWMV 1.5 V8	Jo Bonnier												5			Ret	
1964	Cooper Car Company	Climax FWMV 1.5 V8		DMT	NWT	SYR	AIN	INT	SOL	MED	RAN								
1964	Cooper Car Company	Climax FWMV 1.5 V8	Bruce McLaren	3	Ret														
1964	Cooper Car Company	Climax FWMV 1.5 V8	Phil Hill		DNA		Ret	4											
1964	R.R.C. Walker Racing Team	Climax FWMV 1.5 V8	Jo Bonnier	2	Ret	4	4	16											
