= John Taylor (racing driver) =

British racing driver (1933–1966)

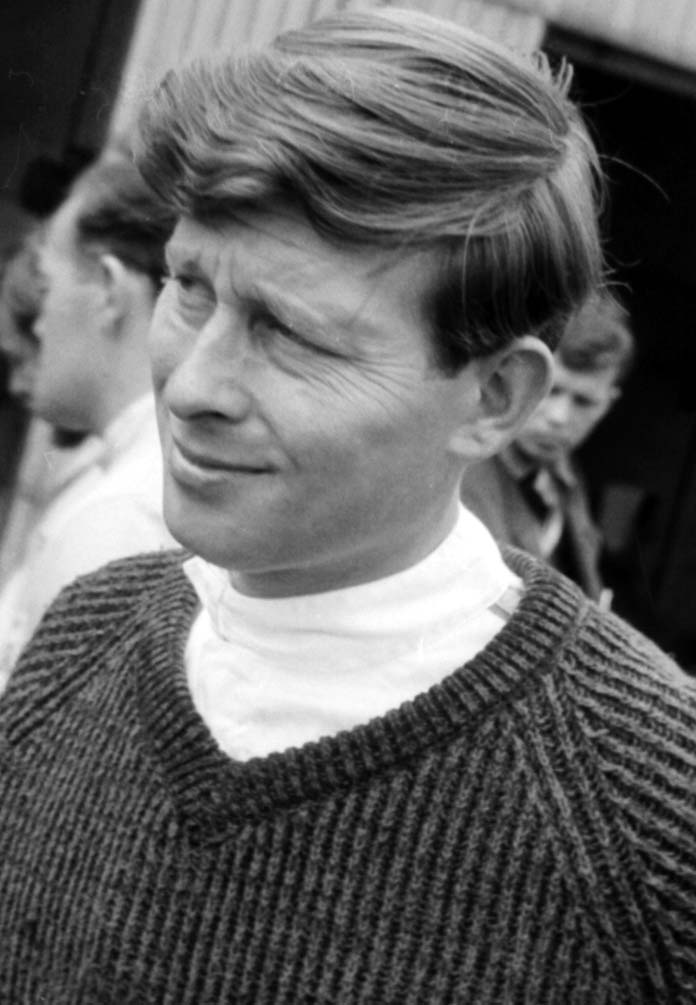
- Taylor at the Nürburgring in 1966
- Born: 23 March 1933; Anstey, Leicestershire, England
- Died: 8 September 1966 (aged 33); Koblenz, Rhineland-Palatinate, West Germany

Formula One World Championship career
- Nationality: (United Kingdom) British
- Active years: 1964, 1966
- Team(s): Bob Gerard Racing (privateer Cooper), Privateer Brabham
- Entries: 5
- Championships: 0
- Wins: 0
- Podiums: 0
- Career points: 1
- Pole positions: 0
- Fastest laps: 0
- First entry: 1964 British Grand Prix
- Last entry: 1966 German Grand Prix

John Malcolm Taylor (23 March 1933 – 8 September 1966) was a racing driver from England. He participated in five World Championship Formula One Grands Prix, and also participated in several non-championship Formula One races. His Formula One debut was on 11 July 1964, at the British Grand Prix at Brands Hatch driving the Formula One/Formula Two hybrid Cooper–Ford T71/T73. He finished fourteenth, 24 laps down, after an extended pit–stop due to a gearbox problem. Taylor did not compete in the Formula One World Championship in 1965, but continued to drive in non–championship races. He returned to Grand Prix racing in 1966, driving a two-litre Brabham–BRM for privateer David Bridges. His first race that season was the French Grand Prix at Reims, where he scored his one championship point. There followed eighth places at both the British Grand Prix at Brands Hatch and the Dutch Grand Prix at Zandvoort.

Taylor died following a crash during the 1966 German Grand Prix at the Nürburgring, when his Brabham collided with Jacky Ickx's F2 Matra on the first lap of the race. He emerged from the wreckage badly burned, and died from his injuries four weeks later.

== Racing record ==
=== Complete Formula One World Championship results ===
(key)

Year	Entrant	Chassis	Engine	1	2	3	4	5	6	7	8	9	10	WDC	Pts
1964	Bob Gerard Racing	Cooper T71/73	Ford 109E 1.5 L4	MON	NED	BEL	FRA	GBR; 14	GER	AUT	ITA	USA	MEX	NC	0
1966	David Bridges	Brabham BT11	BRM P60 2.0 V8	MON	BEL	FRA; 6	GBR; 8	NED; 8	GER; Ret	ITA	USA	MEX		20th	1

=== Complete Formula One Non-Championship results ===
(key)

Year	Entrant	Chassis	Engine	1	2	3	4	5	6	7	8	9	10	11	12	13	14
1963	Bob Gerard Racing	Cooper T59	Ford 109E 1.5 L4	LOM	GLV	PAU	IMO	SYR	AIN; 9	INT; Ret	ROM	SOL	KAN	MED	AUT	OUL	RAN
1964	Bob Gerard Racing	Cooper T71/73	Ford 109E 1.5 L4	DMT	NWT; 7	SYR	AIN; 5	INT; 10	SOL								
1964	Bob Gerard Racing	Cooper T60	Climax FWMV 1.5 V8							MED; 7	RAN						
1965	Bob Gerard Racing	Cooper T60	Climax FWMV 1.5 V8	ROC; 8	SYR	SMT; 7	INT; 11	MED	RAN								
1966	David Bridges	Brabham BT11	BRM P60 2.0 V8	RSA	SYR	INT; 6	OUL										

Preceded by Carel Godin de Beaufort	Formula One fatal accidents 7 August 1966 (date of accident); 8 September 1966 (date of death)	Succeeded by Lorenzo Bandini
