= Edgar Barth =

German racing driver (1917–1965)

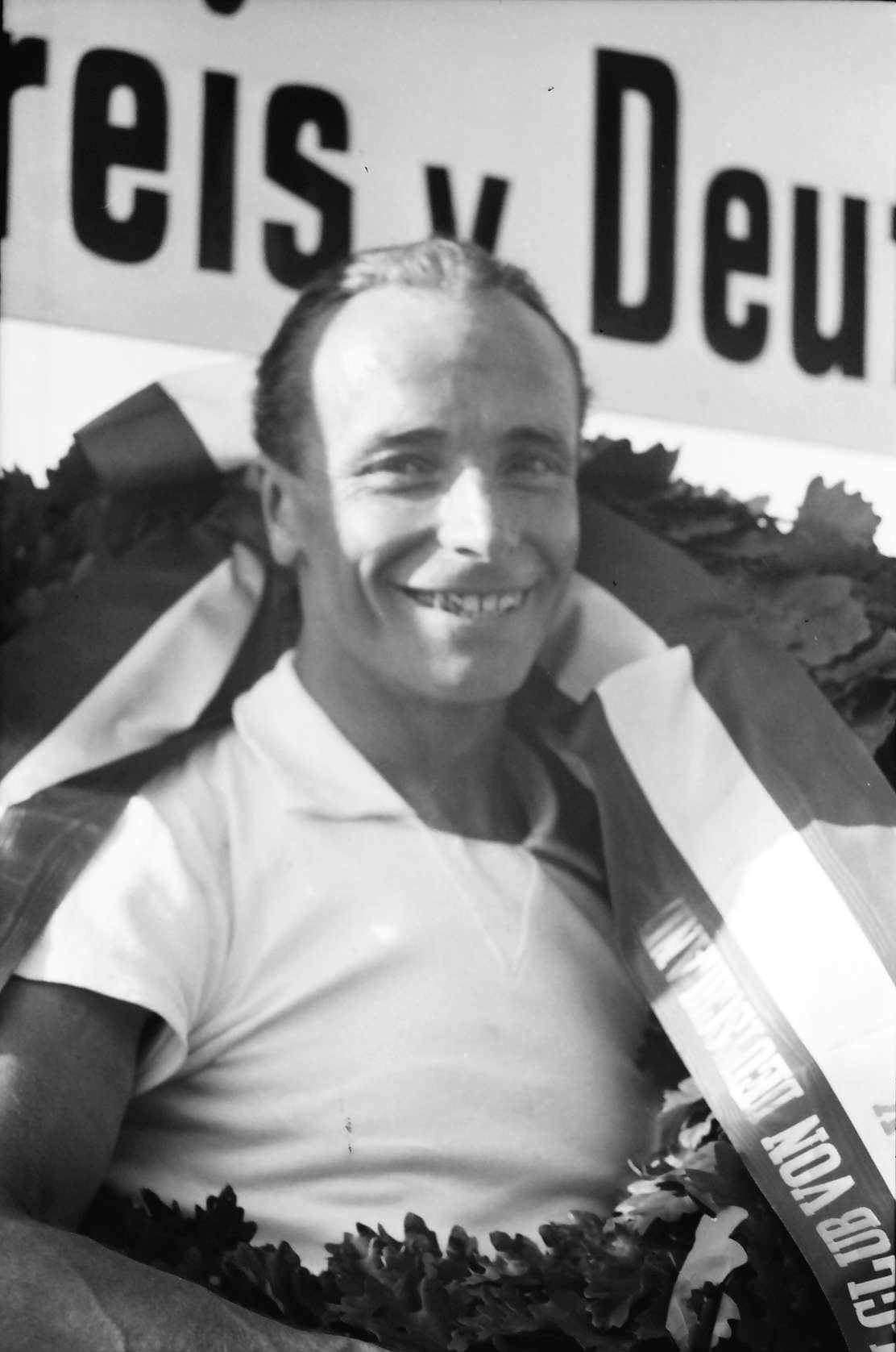
- Barth at the 1957 German Grand Prix
- Born: Wilfried Edgar Barth; 26 January 1917; Herold, Saxony, German Empire
- Died: 20 May 1965 (aged 48); Ludwigsburg, Baden-Württemberg, West Germany
- Children: Jürgen Barth

Formula One World Championship career
- Nationality: (East Germany) East German (1953); (West Germany) West German (1957–1958, 1960–1961, 1964)
- Active years: 1953, 1957–1958, 1960–1961, 1964
- Team(s): EMW, Porsche, Walker
- Entries: 7 entries (5 starts)
- Championships: 0
- Wins: 0
- Podiums: 0
- Career points: 0
- Pole positions: 0
- Fastest laps: 0
- First entry: 1953 German Grand Prix
- Last entry: 1964 German Grand Prix

Wilfried Edgar Barth (German pronunciation: [ˈvɪlfriːt ˈɛt.ɡaːɐ̯ baʁt]; 26 January 1917 – 20 May 1965) was a German racing driver who competed under the East German flag in Formula One in 1953, and as a West German between 1957 and 1964, taking part in five Grands Prix in all. (Note: Barth was also entered into two Grands Prix during the 1961 season with Porsche, but did not complete a competitive session in either.) He also competed in sports car racing, winning the 1959 Targa Florio with Wolfgang Seidel.

== Racing career ==
Barth was born in Herold. He began his career as a DKW motorcycle racer and later switched to BMW sportscars. The East German factory of BMW would become the Eisenacher Motorenwerk (EMW) after the war. He drove the factory team car in the East German Formula 2 Championship, which he won in both 1952 and 1953. He was allowed to participate in three events in the West in 1953, including his first appearance in the Formula One World Championship. He finished fifth in the non-championship Eifelrennen, but retired from the Avusrennen and the German Grand Prix.

In 1957, Barth emigrated to the West and drove sporadically for the works Porsche team in Formula One until 1961. He drove in the F2 sections at his home race in 1956 and 1957, finishing outside the points both times. He drove a Formula 1 car in the 1960 Italian Grand Prix, finishing seventh. He was entered into his home race in 1961 but was later withdrawn and was entered as a substitute at Monza that year. His final F1 appearance came at the 1964 German Grand Prix driving a Cooper-Climax for Rob Walker Racing, failing to make the flag.

Barth participated in the 500 kilometers of the Nürburgring, in 1960 in a BMW 700, finishing fifth. Barth won the 1959, 1963 and 1964 European Mountain Championships (Hillclimb) for Porsche and also the 1959 Targa Florio. Apart from Formula 2 races with Porsche 718, he also took part in the 24 Hours of Le Mans on numerous occasions.

Barth began to suffer from cancer at the end of 1964, and succumbed to the disease in May 1965. His son Jürgen Barth became an engineer at Porsche and also went into motorsport, winning the Le Mans 24 Hours in 1977.

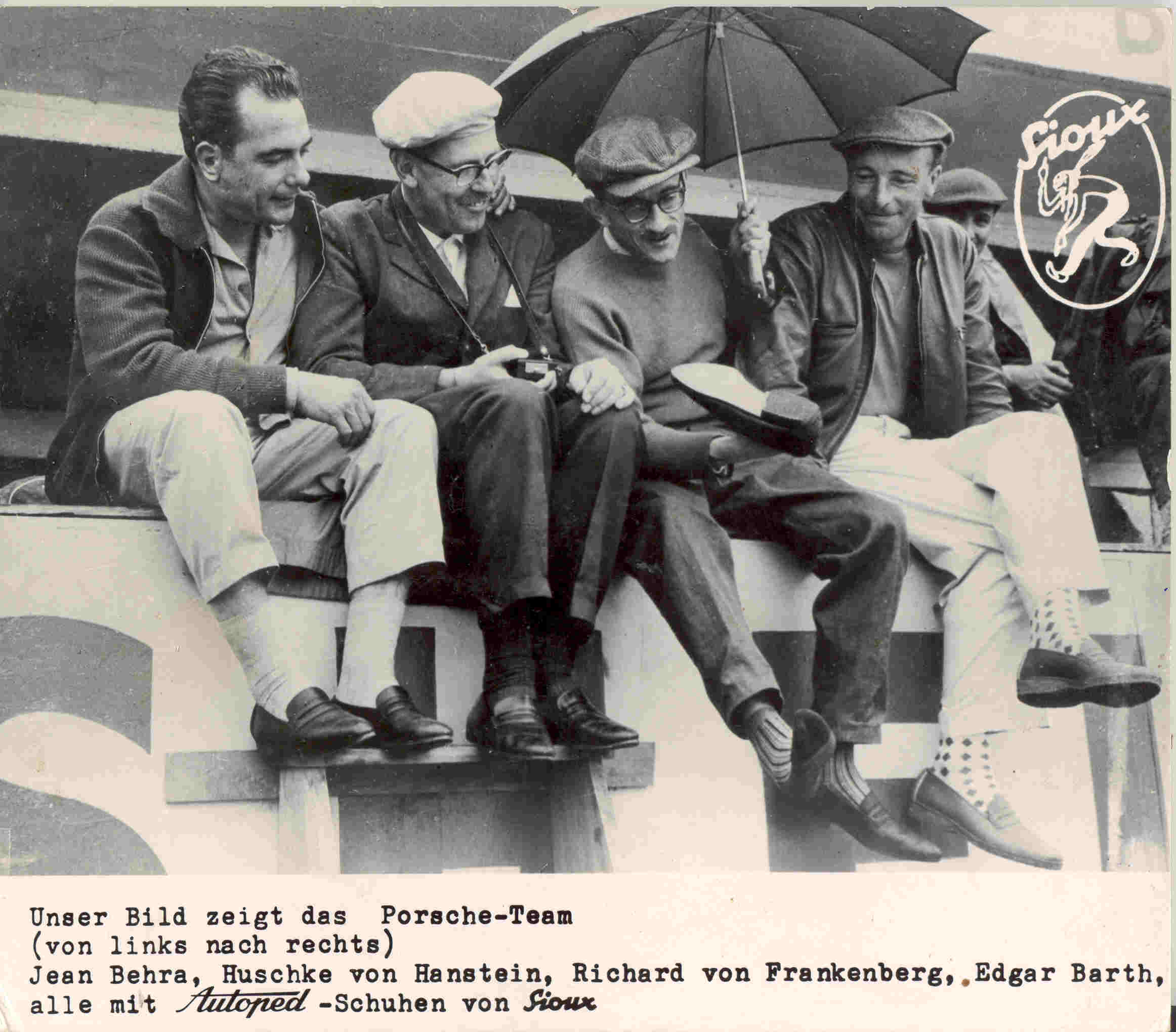
from left to right: Jean Behra, Fritz Huschke von Hanstein, Richard von Frankenberg and Edgar Barth

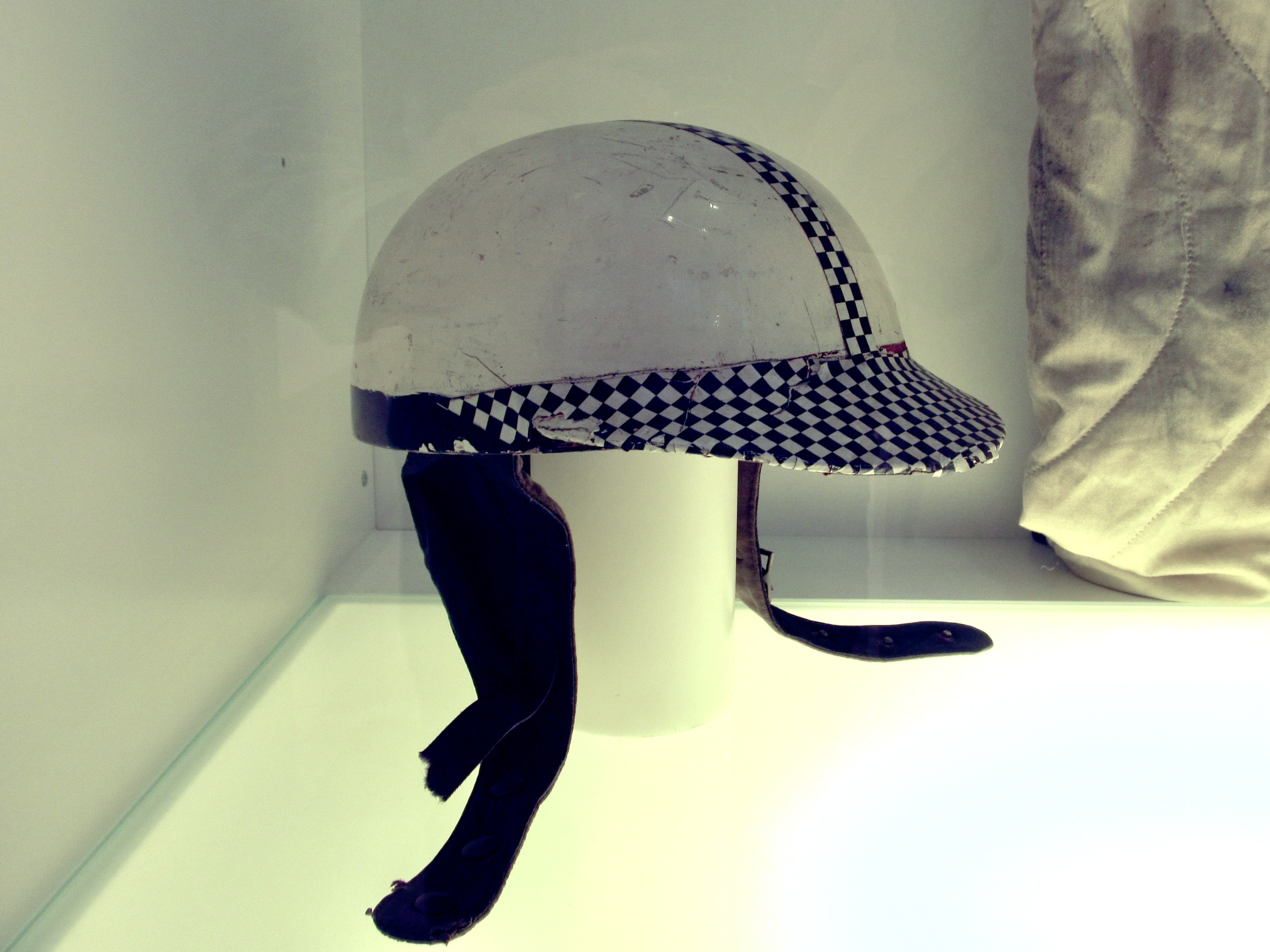
Edgar Barth racing helmet at the Prototyp Museum, Hamburg, Germany.

== Career results ==
=== Complete Formula One World Championship results ===
(key)

Year	Entrant	Chassis	Engine	1	2	3	4	5	6	7	8	9	10	11	WDC	Pts
1953	Rennkollektiv EMW	EMW R2	EMW 6 2.0 L6	ARG	500	NED	BEL	FRA	GBR	GER; Ret	SUI	ITA			NC	0
1957	Dr Ing F. Porsche KG	Porsche RS550 (F2)	Porsche 547/3 1.5 F4	ARG	MON	500	FRA	GBR	GER; 12	PES	ITA				NC	0
1958	Dr Ing F. Porsche KG	Porsche RSK (F2)	Porsche 547/3 1.5 F4	ARG	MON	NED	500	BEL	FRA	GBR	GER; 6	POR	ITA	MOR	NC	0
1960	Dr Ing F. Porsche KG	Porsche 718	Porsche 547/3 1.5 F4	ARG	MON	500	NED	BEL	FRA	GBR	POR	ITA; 7	USA		NC	0
1961	Dr Ing F. Porsche KG	Porsche 787	Porsche 547/3 1.5 F4	MON	NED	BEL	FRA	GBR	GER; WD						NC	0
1961	Porsche System Engineering	Porsche 718	Porsche 547/3 1.5 F4							ITA; PO	USA				NC	0
1964	R.R.C. Walker Racing Team	Cooper T66	Climax FWMV 1.5 V8	MON	NED	BEL	FRA	GBR	GER; Ret	AUT	ITA	USA	MEX		NC	0
