= Jean-Claude Rudaz =

Swiss racing driver (born 1942)

- Born: 23 July 1942 (age 84); Sion, Valais, Switzerland

Formula One World Championship career
- Nationality: (Switzerland) Swiss
- Active years: 1964
- Team: non-works Cooper
- Entries: 1 (0 starts)
- Championships: 0
- Wins: 0
- Podiums: 0
- Career points: 0
- Pole positions: 0
- Fastest laps: 0
- First entry: 1964 Italian Grand Prix

Jean-Claude Rudaz (born 23 July 1942) is a former racing driver from Switzerland. He made one attempt at a World Championship Formula One Grand Prix, at the 1964 Italian Grand Prix with a non-works Cooper T60, run by Fabre Urbain. He blew his engine in practice and was unable to start the race, despite qualifying 20th out of the 25 entrants.

Rudaz also participated in the 1964 24 Hours of Le Mans.

After racing, Rudaz founded the Transvalair airline in 1973, which now specialises in freight forwarding and cargo handling.

== Complete Formula One World Championship results ==
(key)

Year	Entrant	Chassis	Engine	1	2	3	4	5	6	7	8	9	10	WDC	Points
1964	Fabre Urbain	Cooper T60	Climax V8	MON	NED	BEL	FRA	GBR	GER	AUT	ITA; DNS	USA	MEX	NC	0

=== Non-Championship ===
(key)

Year	Entrant	Chassis	Engine	1	2	3	4	5	6	7	8
1964	Fabre Urbain	Cooper T60	Climax V8	DMT	NWT	SYR; Ret	AIN	INT; 14	SOL	MED; DNS	RAN
