= Ian Raby =

British racing driver (1921–1967)

- Born: 22 September 1921; Woolwich, London, England
- Died: 7 November 1967 (aged 46); Lambeth, London, England

Formula One World Championship career
- Nationality: (United Kingdom) British
- Active years: 1963–1965
- Team(s): Gilby, Brabham (privateer)
- Entries: 7 (3 starts)
- Championships: 0
- Wins: 0
- Podiums: 0
- Career points: 0
- Pole positions: 0
- Fastest laps: 0
- First entry: 1963 British Grand Prix
- Last entry: 1965 German Grand Prix

Ian Ewart Raby (22 September 1921 – 7 November 1967) was a British racing driver from England. He participated in seven World Championship Formula One Grands Prix, debuting on 20 July 1963 in the British Grand Prix, where he retired on Lap 60. He scored no championship points. He was a garage-owner in Brighton, Sussex trading as Empire Cars Ltd. As a privateer he came to Formula One late in life.

Raby started racing about 1953 and drove an assortment of cars, many with the name "puddle jumper" written on the side. He is remembered for the I.E.R. Midget F3 car of 1954. He won the 500 c.c. racing car class in a Cooper at the Brighton Speed Trials in 1955. Raby finished 15th in the 1957 24 Hours of Le Mans, sharing a Cooper-Climax T39 with Jack Brabham. He won the first Formula Junior race to be held in Britain, at Brands Hatch on 3 August 1959 driving the one-off Moorland car. On 12 June 1960, he won a heat and finished second overall in the Albi Grand Prix, France, for Formula Junior cars. Later that year, he won a Formula Libre race at Mallory Park in a Cooper-Climax F2. On 9 May 1963, he took third place in the non-championship F1 Rome Grand Prix at Vallelunga in a Gilby-B.R.M. V8. At the Solitude Grand Prix, he was still running at the end but not classified, and he retired in the Oulton Park Gold Cup.

Raby switched to a Brabham-B.R.M. for 1964, but the car often let him down, non-starting in the Italian Grand Prix at Monza. He managed an eighth at Syracuse in the Brabham in 1965, selling the car prior to the Italian Grand Prix that year.

As Formula One switched to 3-litres for 1966, Raby opted to race in Formula Two. An F2 Brabham-Ford Lotus twin-cam for 1967 produced an eighth place at Snetterton on 24 March. Another eighth place at Hockenheim in June only highlighted the lack of a de rigueur Cosworth FVA engine. Back at Hockenheim on 9 July, Raby managed fifth place against his more powerful rivals.

On 30 July 1967, Raby crashed his Brabham in the Zandvoort Trophy (Grote Prijs van Zandvoort) F2 race and was seriously injured. He succumbed to his injuries on 7 November 1967.

== Complete Formula One World Championship results ==
(key)

Year	Entrant	Chassis	Engine	1	2	3	4	5	6	7	8	9	10	WDC	Points
1963	Ian Raby	Gilby	BRM V8	MON	BEL	NED	FRA	GBR; Ret	GER; DNQ	ITA; DNQ	USA	MEX	RSA	NC	0
1964	Ian Raby	Brabham BT3	BRM V8	MON	NED	BEL	FRA	GBR; Ret	GER	AUT	ITA; DNQ	USA	MEX	NC	0
1965	Ian Raby	Brabham BT3	BRM V8	RSA	MON	BEL	FRA	GBR; 11	NED	GER; DNQ	ITA	USA	MEX	NC	0
