= Walt Hansgen =

American racing driver (1919–1966)

- Born: 28 October 1919; Westfield, New Jersey, U.S.
- Died: 7 April 1966 (aged 46); Orléans, France

Formula One World Championship career
- Nationality: (United States) American
- Active years: 1961, 1964
- Team(s): Lotus, Cooper
- Entries: 2
- Championships: 0
- Wins: 0
- Podiums: 0
- Career points: 2
- Pole positions: 0
- Fastest laps: 0
- First entry: 1961 United States Grand Prix
- Last entry: 1964 United States Grand Prix

NASCAR Cup Series career
- 3 races run over 2 years
- First race: 1964 Race 38 (Bridgehampton)
- Last race: 1965 The Glen 151.8 (Watkins Glen)
| Wins | Top tens | Poles |
|---|---|---|
| 0 | 3 | 0 |

Walter Edwin Hansgen (28 October 1919 – 7 April 1966) was an American racecar driver. His motorsport career began as a road racing driver, he made his Grand Prix debut at 41, and he died aged 46, several days after crashing during testing for the 1966 24 Hours of Le Mans.

== Racing career ==
A four-time SCCA Road Racing Champ, Hansgen participated in two Formula One Grands Prix, debuting on 8 October 1961, at Watkins Glen, New York. He scored a total of two championship points. In 1964 he raced the MG Liquid Suspension Special, an Offenhauser-powered car, for Kjell Qvale, at the Indianapolis 500. He finished 13th in that race. He raced there again in 1965, in the MG-Huffaker-Offenhauser, when he finished 14th.

In addition to Formula One, Hansgen was a dominant road racer from the early 1950s and 1960s, winning numerous races at VIR, the famed course at Bridgehampton, and Watkins Glen through to his death at Le Mans in France in 1966.

Hangsen drove for Briggs Cunningham and John Mecom. Hansgen won the Formula Junior race at the inaugural United States Grand Prix meeting at Sebring, Florida, on 12 December 1959, driving a Stanguellini. Hansgen won the Monterey Grand Prix, at Laguna Seca Raceway, on 17 October 1965, driving John Mecom's Lola T70-Ford. He participated in several races of the 24 Hours of Daytona and Le Mans as well as the 12 Hours of Sebring endurance races. He also was notable for introducing Mark Donohue to professional road racing.

Hansgen was killed when he crashed a 7-liter Holman & Moody Ford GT 40 Mk2 sports car while driving in the rain during the Le Mans tests on 3 April 1966. "A Ford spokesman said Hansgen's car appeared to have been aquaplaning on the wet track leaving no way for the driver to control it." Ford crew members later said that Hansgen had continued to push hard in the damp weather, although he had been warned by team manager Carroll Smith to take it easy. In Mark Donohue's book, The Unfair Advantage, it is said that Hansgen tried to drive onto an escape road, only to find out too late that a barrier had been built across it for spectator safety.

== Racing record ==
=== SCCA National Championships ===
| Year | Class | Car | Position |
|---|---|---|---|
| 1956 | C Modified | Jaguar D-Type | **1st** |
| 1957 | C Modified | Jaguar D-Type | **1st** |
| 1958 | C Modified | Jaguar D-Type | **1st** |
| 1959 | C Modified | Lister Jaguar | **1st** |

=== 24 Hours of Le Mans results ===
| Year | Team | Co-Drivers | Car | Class | Laps | Pos. | Class Pos. |
|---|---|---|---|---|---|---|---|
| 1959 | (United Kingdom) Brian Lister Engineering | (United Kingdom) Peter Blond | Lister Sport | S3.0 | 52 | DNF | DNF |
| 1960 | (United States) B.S. Cunningham | (United States) Dan Gurney | Jaguar E2A | S3.0 | 89 | DNF | DNF |
| 1961 | (United States) B.S. Cunningham | (New Zealand) Bruce McLaren | Maserati Tipo 63 | S3.0 | 31 | DNF | DNF |
| 1962 | (United States) Briggs Cunningham | (New Zealand) Bruce McLaren | Maserati Tipo 151 Coupé | E +3.0 | 177 | DNF | DNF |
| 1963 | (United States) Briggs Cunningham | (United States) Augie Pabst | Jaguar E-Type Lightweight | GT +3.0 | 8 | DNF | DNF |

=== Complete Formula One World Championship results ===
(key)

| Year | Entrant | Chassis | Engine | 1 | 2 | 3 | 4 | 5 | 6 | 7 | 8 | 9 | 10 | WDC | Points |
|---|---|---|---|---|---|---|---|---|---|---|---|---|---|---|---|
| 1961 | Momo Corporation | Cooper T53 | Climax L4 | MON | NED | BEL | FRA | GBR | GER | ITA | USA; Ret | | | NC | 0 |
| 1964 | Team Lotus | Lotus 33 | Climax V8 | MON | NED | BEL | FRA | GBR | GER | AUT | ITA | USA; 5 | MEX | 16th | 2 |

=== Indianapolis 500 ===
| Year | Chassis | Engine | Start | Finish | Team |
|---|---|---|---|---|---|
| 1964 | Huffaker | Offy | 10 | 13 | Kjell Qvale |
| 1965 | Huffaker | Offy | 21 | 14 | Kjell Qvale |

=== NASCAR ===
(key) (Bold – Pole position awarded by qualifying time. Italics – Pole position earned by points standings or practice time. * – Most laps led.)

==== Grand National Series ====
NASCAR Grand National Series results
| Year | Team | No. | Make | 1 | 2 | 3 | 4 | 5 | 6 | 7 | 8 | 9 | 10 | 11 | 12 | 13 | 14 | 15 | 16 | 17 | 18 | 19 | 20 | 21 | 22 | 23 | 24 | 25 | 26 | 27 | 28 | 29 | 30 | 31 | 32 | 33 | 34 | 35 | 36 | 37 | 38 | 39 | 40 | 41 | 42 | 43 | 44 | 45 | 46 | 47 | 48 | 49 | 50 | 51 | 52 | 53 | 54 | 55 | 56 | 57 | 58 | 59 | 60 | 61 | 62 | NGNC | Pts | Ref |
|---|---|---|---|---|---|---|---|---|---|---|---|---|---|---|---|---|---|---|---|---|---|---|---|---|---|---|---|---|---|---|---|---|---|---|---|---|---|---|---|---|---|---|---|---|---|---|---|---|---|---|---|---|---|---|---|---|---|---|---|---|---|---|---|---|---|---|---|---|
| 1964 | LOH Ford | 46 | Ford | CON | AUG | JSP | SVH | RSD | DAY | DAY | DAY | RCH | BRI | GPS | BGS | ATL | AWS | HBO | PIF | CLB | NWS | MAR | SVH | DAR | LGY | HCY | SBO | CLT | GPS | ASH | ATL | CON | NSV | CHT | BIR | VAL | PIF | DAY | ODS | OBS | BRR; 3 | ISP | GLN; 3 | LIN | BRI | NSV | MBS | AWS | DTS | ONA | CLB | BGS | STR | DAR | HCY | RCH | ODS | HBO | MAR | SVH | NWS | CLT | HAR | AUG | JAC | NA | - | |
| 1965 | LOH Ford | 46 | Ford | RSD | DAY | DAY | DAY | PIF | AWS | RCH | HBO | ATL | GPS | NWS | MAR | CLB | BRI | DAR | LGY | BGS | HCY | CLT | CCF | ASH | HAR | NSV | BIR | ATL | GPS | MBS | VAL | DAY | ODS | OBS | ISP | GLN; 6 | BRI | NSV | CCF | AWS | SMR | PIF | AUG | CLB | DTS | BLV | BGS | DAR | HCY | LIN | ODS | RCH | MAR | NWS | CLT | HBO | CAR | DTS | | | | | | | | NA | - | |

== Books ==
- Michael Argetsinger, Walt Hansgen, His Life and the History of Post-War American Road Racing, David Bull Publishing, 2006, ISBN 1-893618-54-4
