= Tony Maggs =

South African racing driver (1937–2009)

- Born: Anthony Francis O'Connell Maggs; 9 February 1937; Pretoria, Transvaal, Union of South Africa
- Died: 2 June 2009 (aged 72); Caledon, Western Cape, South Africa

Formula One World Championship career
- Nationality: (South Africa) South African
- Active years: 1961–1965
- Team(s): Privateer Lotus, Cooper, Centro Sud, Parnell
- Entries: 27 (25 starts)
- Championships: 0
- Wins: 0
- Podiums: 3
- Career points: 26
- Pole positions: 0
- Fastest laps: 0
- First entry: 1961 British Grand Prix
- Last entry: 1965 South African Grand Prix

Anthony Francis O'Connell Maggs (9 February 1937 – 2 June 2009) was a South African racing driver, who competed in Formula One from 1961 to 1965.

Maggs participated in 27 World Championship Grands Prix, debuting at the 1961 British Grand Prix. He achieved three podiums, and scored a total of 26 championship points. He was the first South African to take part in a Formula One Grand Prix.

== Life and career ==
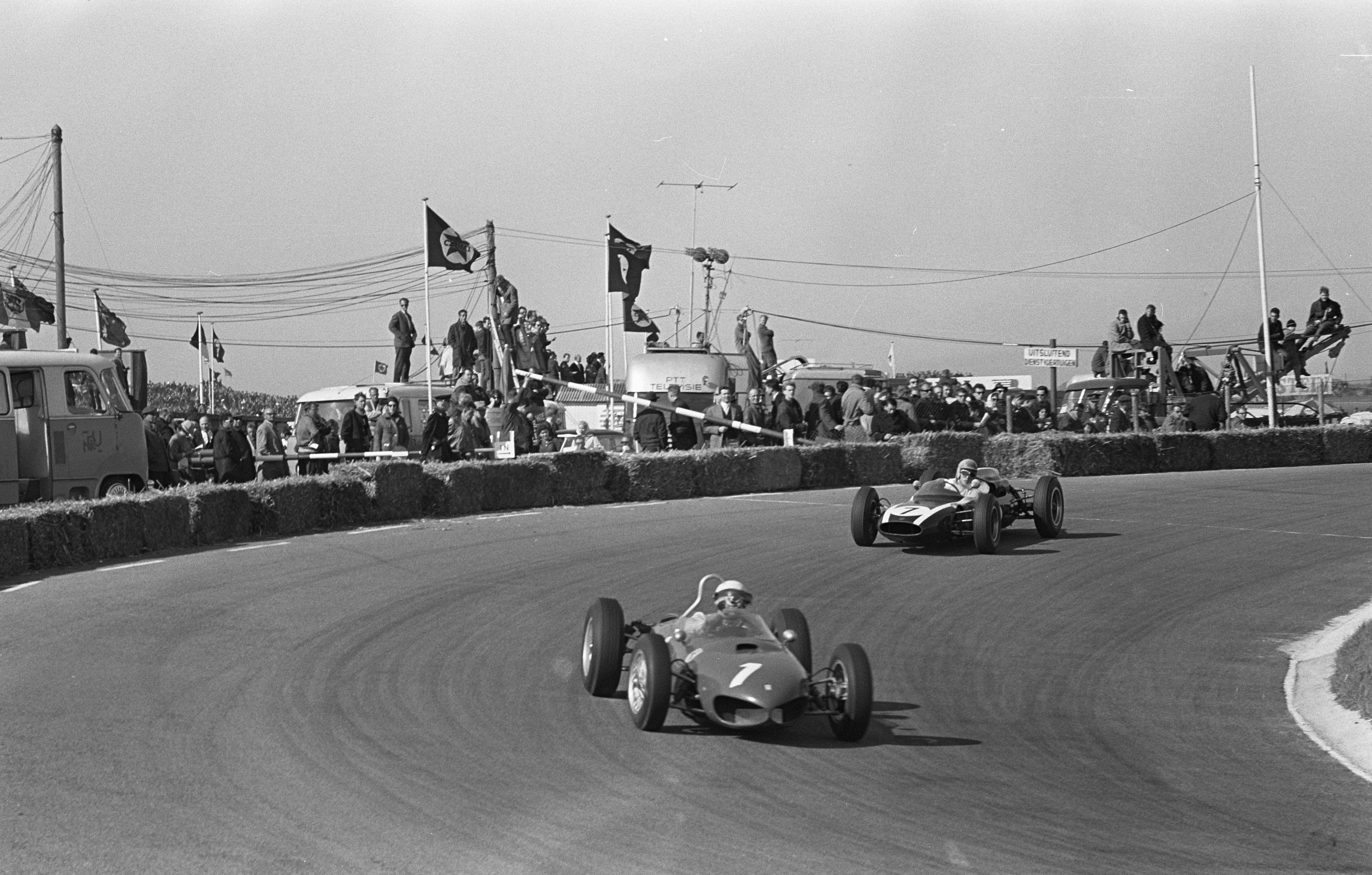
Maggs following Phil Hill at the 1962 Dutch Grand Prix

Anthony Francis O'Connell Maggs was born on 9 February 1937 in Pretoria, Transvaal, Union of South Africa. The son of a wealthy farmer and businessman, Tony Maggs was part of Ken Tyrrell's Formula Junior, Cooper-BMC team in 1961 and shared the European Championship with Jo Siffert. He was invited into the Cooper Formula One team for 1962–1963, finishing second in the French Grand Prix both years, but was dropped at the end of 1963.

Maggs then moved to Scuderia Centro Sud for 1964 and despite the fact that their BRM P57s were not current machinery achieved two points finishes out of three race starts. He also returned to Formula Two with an MRP Lola and with David Piper won the Kyalami 9 Hours race in the latter's Ferrari GTO.

In 1965, Maggs raced only once in Formula One, for Reg Parnell Racing, in the South African Grand Prix at East London but continued with success in both Formula Two and sports cars. However, in a national race at Pietermaritzburg he crashed his Brabham and a young spectator standing in a restricted area was hit and killed. Maggs immediately retired from motor sport to concentrate on his business interests.

Maggs died on 2 June 2009, from cancer.

== Complete Formula One World Championship results ==
(key)

Year	Entrant	Chassis	Engine	1	2	3	4	5	6	7	8	9	10	WDC	Points
1961	Louise Bryden-Brown	Lotus 18	Climax Straight-4	MON	NED	BEL	FRA	GBR; 13	GER; 11	ITA	USA			NC	0
1962	Cooper Car Company	Cooper T55	Climax Straight-4	NED; 5	MON; Ret				GER; 9					7th	13
1962	Cooper Car Company	Cooper T60	Climax V8			BEL; Ret	FRA; 2	GBR; 6		ITA; 7	USA; 7	RSA; 3		7th	13
1963	Cooper Car Company	Cooper T66	Climax V8	MON; 5	BEL; 7	NED; Ret	FRA; 2	GBR; 9	GER; Ret	ITA; 6	USA; Ret	MEX; Ret	RSA; 7	8th	9
1964	Scuderia Centro Sud	BRM P57	BRM V8	MON	NED; DNS	BEL; DNS	FRA	GBR; Ret	GER; 6	AUT; 4	ITA	USA	MEX	12th	4
1965	Reg Parnell Racing	Lotus 25	BRM V8	RSA; 11	MON	BEL	FRA	GBR	NED	GER	ITA	USA	MEX	NC	0
