= Ronnie Bucknum =

American racing driver (1936–1992)

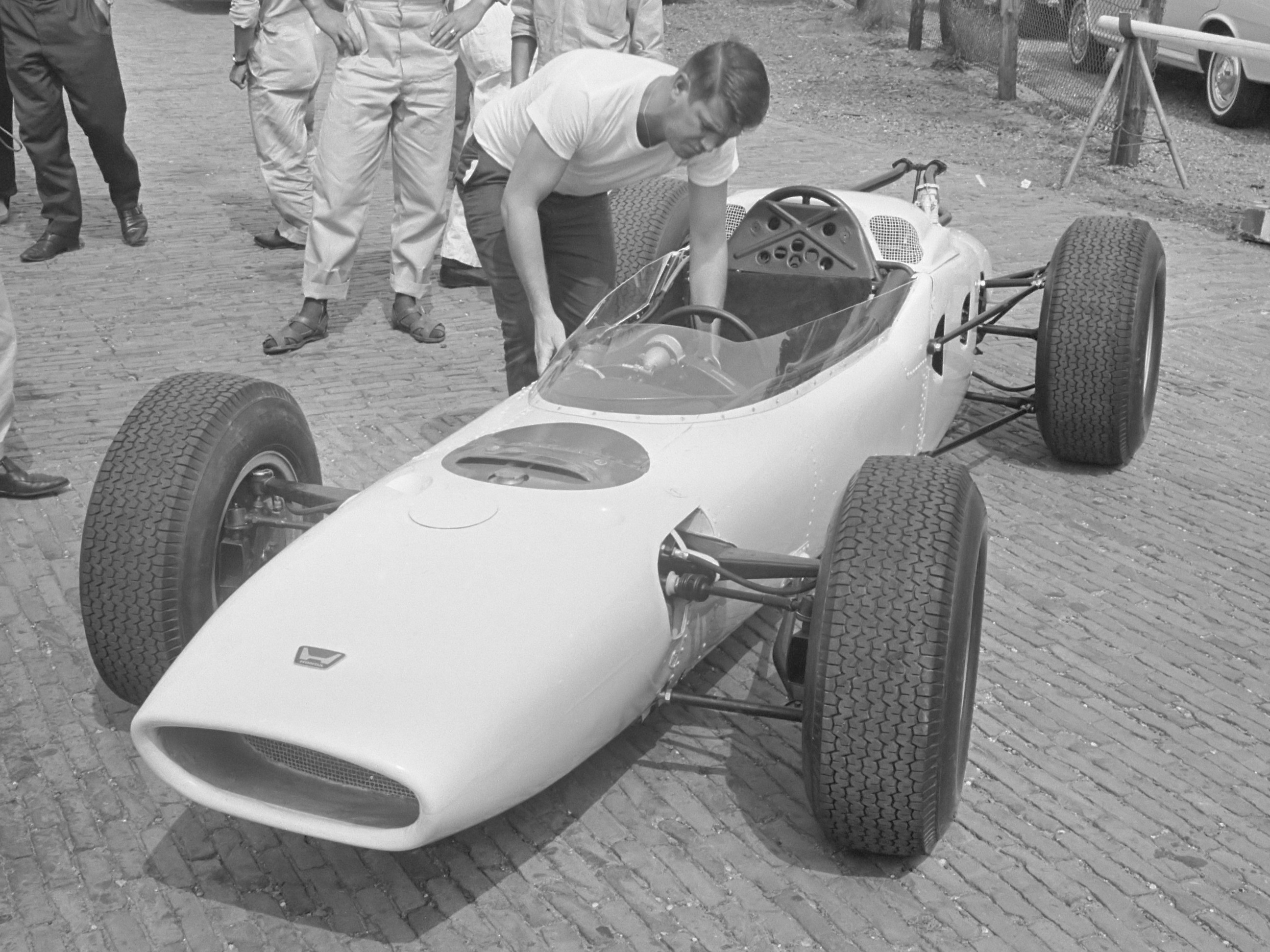
- Bucknum and his Honda (1964)
- Born: Ronald James Bucknum; April 5, 1936 Alhambra, California, U.S.
- Died: April 23, 1992 (aged 56) San Luis Obispo, California, U.S.

Formula One World Championship career
- Nationality: (United States) American
- Active years: 1964 – 1966
- Team: Honda
- Entries: 11
- Championships: 0
- Wins: 0
- Podiums: 0
- Career points: 2
- Pole positions: 0
- Fastest laps: 0
- First entry: 1964 German Grand Prix
- Last entry: 1966 Mexican Grand Prix

Champ Car career
- 23 races run over 6 years
- Years active: 1966–1971
- Best finish: 14th – 1968
- First race: 1967 Telegraph Trophy 200 (Mosport)
- Last race: 1970 Trenton 300 (Trenton)
- First win: 1968 Michigan Inaugural 250 (Michigan)
Wins	Podiums	Poles
1	4	1

Ronald James Bucknum (April 5, 1936 – April 23, 1992) was an American race car driver, born in Alhambra, California.

Bucknum participated in 11 Formula One World Championship Grands Prix, debuting on August 2, 1964. He scored a total of two championship points. At the 1964 German Grand Prix, he became the first person to drive a Honda-engined car in Formula One.

After Formula One, Bucknum drove in the USAC Championship Car series, racing in the 1967–1970 seasons with 23 starts, including the Indianapolis 500 in 1968–1970. He finished in the top-ten ten times, with his one victory coming at Michigan International Speedway in 1968.

Bucknum was the father of Jeff Bucknum, an Indy Racing League and American Le Mans Series driver. Ronnie Bucknum died in San Luis Obispo, California following complications from diabetes.

== Complete Formula One World Championship results ==
(key)

Year	Entrant	Chassis	Engine	1	2	3	4	5	6	7	8	9	10	WDC	Points
1964	Honda R & D Co.	Honda RA271	Honda V12	MON	NED	BEL	FRA	GBR	GER; 13	AUT	ITA; Ret	USA; Ret	MEX	NC	0
1965	Honda R & D Co.	Honda RA272	Honda V12	RSA	MON; Ret	BEL; Ret	FRA; Ret	GBR	NED	GER	ITA; Ret	USA; 13	MEX; 5	14th	2
1966	Honda R & D Co.	Honda RA273	Honda V12	MON	BEL	FRA	GBR	NED	GER	ITA	USA; Ret	MEX; 8		NC	0

== Complete 24 Hours of Le Mans results ==
Year	Team	Co-drivers	Car	Class	Laps	Pos.	Class pos.
1965	(Switzerland) Scuderia Filipinetti	(Switzerland) Herbert Müller	Ford GT40	P +5.0	29	DNF	DNF
1966	(United States) Ford Motor Company (United States) Holman & Moody	(United States) Dick Hutcherson	Ford GT40 Mk.II	P +5.0	348	3rd	3rd
1967	(United States) Ford Motor Company (United States) Shelby American	(Australia) Paul Hawkins	Ford GT40 Mk.IIB	P +5.0	271	DNF	DNF
1970	(United States) North American Racing Team	(United States) Sam Posey	Ferrari 512S	S 5.0	313	4th	3rd
1975	(United States) North American Racing Team	(Italy) Carlo Facetti	Ferrari 365 GTB/4	GTX	0	DNS	DNS

== Complete USAC Championship Car results ==
Year	1	2	3	4	5	6	7	8	9	10	11	12	13	14	15	16	17	18	19	20	21	22	23	24	25	26	27	28	Pos	Points
1966	PHX	TRE	INDY; DNQ	MIL	LAN	ATL	PIP	IRP	LAN	SPR	MIL	DUQ	ISF	TRE	SAC	PHX													-	0
1967	PHX	TRE	INDY; DNQ	MIL	LAN	PIP	MOS; DNS	MOS; 18	IRP; 9	LAN; DNQ	MTR; 3	MTR; 12	SPR	MIL	DUQ	ISF	TRE	SAC	HAN	PHX	RIV; 9								-	0
1968	HAN	LVG	PHX	TRE	INDY; 21	MIL	MOS; 5	MOS; 3	LAN	PIP	CDR; 19	NAZ	IRP; 6	IRP; 4	LAN	LAN	MTR; 3	MTR; 4	SPR	MIL	DUQ	ISF	TRE	SAC	MCH; 1	HAN; 20	PHX; 14	RIV; 13	22nd	760
1969	PHX; DNP	HAN; DNP	INDY; 30	MIL	LAN	PIP	CDR	NAZ	TRE	IRP	IRP	MIL	SPR	DOV	DUQ	ISF	BRN	BRN	TRE	SAC	KEN; DNP	KEN	PHX; DNQ	RIV; 17					-	0
1970	PHX	SON; 16	TRE	INDY; 15	MIL; DNQ	LAN; DNP	CDR	MCH	IRP; 20	SPR	MIL	ONT; DNP	DUQ	ISF	SED	TRE; 11	SAC	PHX											45th	60
1971	RAF	RAF	PHX	TRE	INDY; DNQ	MIL	POC	MCH	MIL	ONT	TRE	PHX																	-	0

=== Indianapolis 500 results ===
Year	Chassis	Engine	Start	Finish
1966	Lola	Chevrolet	Failed to Qualify	
1967	Gerhardt	Ford	Failed to Qualify	
1968	Eagle	Ford	19th	21st
1969	Eagle	Offy	16th	30th
1970	Cecil	Ford	27th	15th
1971	Vollstedt	Ford	Failed to Qualify	
