= 1964 BRDC International Trophy =

- Non-championship race in the 1964 Formula One season
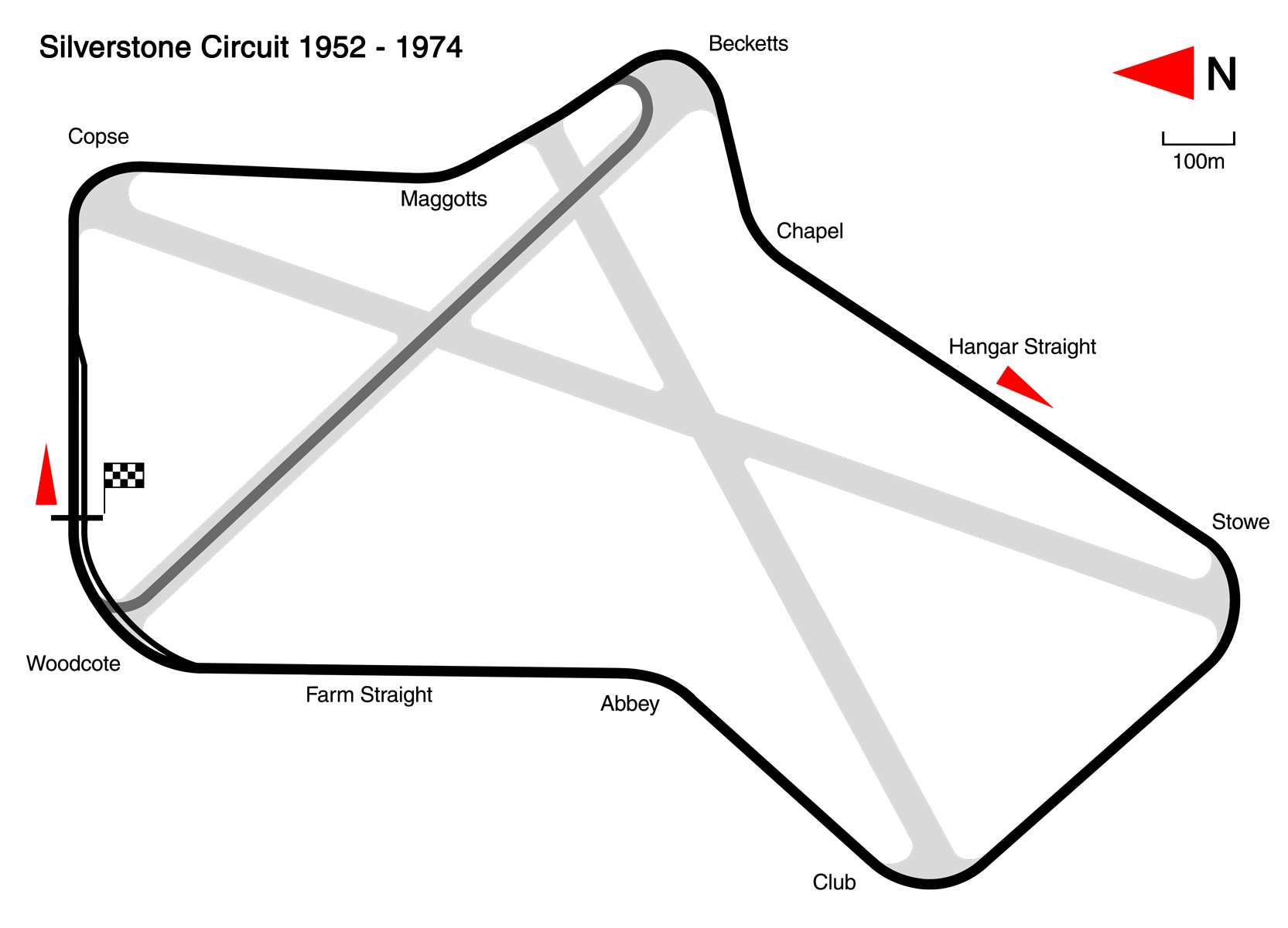

Race details
- Date: 2 May 1964
- Official name: XVI BRDC International Trophy
- Location: Silverstone Circuit, Northamptonshire
- Course: Permanent racing facility
- Course length: 4.711 km (2.927 miles)
- Distance: 52 laps, 244.972 km (152.204 miles)

Pole position
Driver	(United States) Dan Gurney	Brabham-Climax
- Time: 1:33.4

Fastest lap
Driver	(Australia) Jack Brabham	Brabham-Climax
- Time: 1:33.6

Podium
First	(Australia) Jack Brabham	Brabham-Climax
Second	(United Kingdom) Graham Hill	BRM
Third	(United Kingdom) Peter Arundell	Lotus-Climax

The 16th BRDC International Trophy was a motor race run to Formula One rules, held on 2 May 1964 at the Silverstone Circuit, England. The race was run over 52 laps, and was won by Australian driver Jack Brabham in his own Brabham BT7.

== Results ==
Pos	Driver	Entrant	Constructor	Time/Retired	Grid
1	(Australia) Jack Brabham	Brabham Racing Organisation	Brabham-Climax	1.22:45.2	2
2	(United Kingdom) Graham Hill	Owen Racing Organisation	BRM	+ 0.0	3
3	(United Kingdom) Peter Arundell	Team Lotus	Lotus-Climax	+ 1:29.0	6
4	(United States) Phil Hill	Cooper Car Company	Cooper-Climax	51 laps	9
5	(New Zealand) Chris Amon	Reg Parnell Racing	Lotus-BRM	51 laps	12
6	(United Kingdom) Mike Hailwood	Reg Parnell Racing	Lotus-BRM	51 laps	11
7	(South Africa) Tony Maggs	Scuderia Centro Sud	BRM	51 laps	13
8	(Italy) Giancarlo Baghetti	Scuderia Centro Sud	BRM	49 laps	16
9	(United States) Peter Revson	Revson Racing (America)	Lotus-BRM	49 laps	15
10	(United Kingdom) John Taylor	Gerard Racing	Cooper-Ford	49 laps	14
11	(Switzerland) Jo Siffert	Siffert Racing Team	Lotus-BRM	49 laps	21
12	(United Kingdom) Innes Ireland	British Racing Partnership	BRP-BRM	Accident (47 laps)	8
13	(Netherlands) Carel Godin de Beaufort	Ecurie Maarsbergen	Porsche	47 laps	22
14	(Switzerland) Jean-Claude Rudaz	Fabre Urbain	Cooper-Climax	47 laps	20
15	(New Zealand) Bruce McLaren	Cooper Car Company	Cooper-Climax	Handling (40 laps)	5
16	(Sweden) Jo Bonnier	Rob Walker Racing Team	Cooper-Climax	39 laps	17
Ret	(United States) Dan Gurney	Brabham Racing Organisation	Brabham-Climax	Brakes	1
Ret	(United Kingdom) Ian Raby	Ian Raby (Racing)	Brabham-BRM	Piston	19
Ret	(United Kingdom) John Surtees	SEFAC Ferrari	Ferrari	Fuel pump	7
Ret	(United Kingdom) Trevor Taylor	British Racing Partnership	BRP-BRM	Oil pressure	10
Ret	(United Kingdom) Bob Anderson	DW Racing Enterprises	Brabham-Climax	Clutch	18
Ret	(United Kingdom) Jim Clark	Team Lotus	Lotus-Climax	Engine	4
WD	(United States) Richie Ginther	Owen Racing Organisation	BRM	No car	-
WD	(Italy) Lorenzo Bandini	SEFAC Ferrari	Ferrari		-

Previous race: 1964 Aintree 200	Formula One non-championship races 1964 season	Next race: 1964 Solitude Grand Prix
Previous race: 1963 BRDC International Trophy	BRDC International Trophy	Next race: 1965 BRDC International Trophy
