= 1963 Monaco Grand Prix =

Coordinates: 43°44′4.74″N 7°25′16.8″E

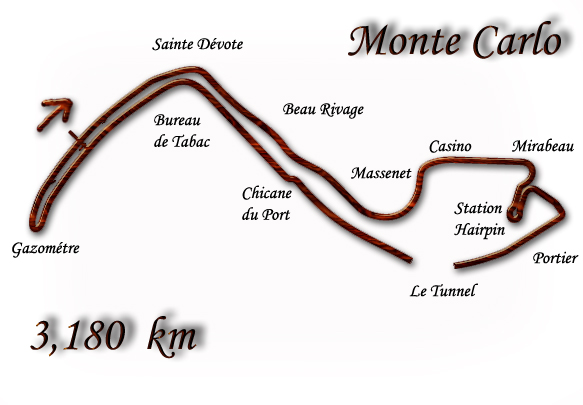

Race details
- Date: 26 May 1963
- Official name: XXI Grand Prix de Monaco
- Location: Circuit de Monaco; Monte Carlo
- Course: Temporary street circuit
- Course length: 3.145 km (1.954 miles)
- Distance: 100 laps, 314.500 km (195.421 miles)
- Weather: Warm, dry and sunny

Pole position
Driver	(United Kingdom) Jim Clark	Lotus-Climax
- Time: 1:34.3

Fastest lap
Driver	(United Kingdom) John Surtees	Ferrari
- Time: 1:34.5 on lap 100

Podium
First	(United Kingdom) Graham Hill	BRM
Second	(United States) Richie Ginther	BRM
Third	(New Zealand) Bruce McLaren	Cooper-Climax

The 1963 Monaco Grand Prix was a Formula One motor race held at Monaco on 26 May 1963. It was race 1 of 10 in both the 1963 World Championship of Drivers and the 1963 International Cup for Formula One Manufacturers. The 100-lap race was won by British driver Graham Hill driving a BRM P57 after Jim Clark retired from the lead with a broken gearbox on lap 78.

Clark took pole position for the event ahead of Hill and John Surtees. The two BRM drivers, Hill and Richie Ginther, led the opening laps in first and second respectively. Clark overtook Ginther for second on lap 5, and Hill for the lead on lap 18. Surtees was also able to overtake Ginther and Hill into second by lap 56, before Hill re-overtook him. Surtees then fell back. Clark retired on lap 78 with a gearbox failure, allowing Hill to win the race, with Ginther and Bruce McLaren completing the podium. Surtees, suffering from his mechanical issue, finished fourth.

== Classification ==
=== Qualifying ===
Pos	No	Driver	Constructor	Qualifying times			Gap	Grid
Pos	No	Driver	Constructor	Q1	Q2	Q3	Gap	Grid
1	9	(United Kingdom) Jim Clark	Lotus-Climax	1:35.3	1:34.3	1:35.2		1
2	6	(United Kingdom) Graham Hill	BRM	1:37.0	1:35.7	1:35.0	+0.7	2
3	21	(United Kingdom) John Surtees	Ferrari	1:38.7	1:35.2	1:36.5	+0.9	3
4	5	(United States) Richie Ginther	BRM	1:37.0	1:35.8	1:35.2	+0.9	4
5	14	(United Kingdom) Innes Ireland	Lotus-BRM	1:37.9	1:35.5	1:35.7	+1.2	5
6	4	(United States) Dan Gurney	Brabham-Climax	1:38.9	1:36.1	1:35.8	+1.5	6
7	20	(Belgium) Willy Mairesse	Ferrari	1:37.6	1:36.0	1:35.9	+1.6	7
8	7	(New Zealand) Bruce McLaren	Cooper-Climax	1:43.8	1:38.3	1:36.0	+1.7	8
9	10	(United Kingdom) Trevor Taylor	Lotus-Climax	1:39.1	1:37.2	1:38.6	+2.9	9
10	8	(South Africa) Tony Maggs	Cooper-Climax	1:38.4	1:37.9	1:39.1	+3.6	10
11	11	(Sweden) Jo Bonnier	Cooper-Climax	1:42.5	1:39.4	1:38.6	+4.3	11
12	25	(Switzerland) Jo Siffert	Lotus-BRM	1:41.7	1:40.9	1:39.4	+5.1	12
13	12	(United States) Jim Hall	Lotus-BRM	1:41.0	1:41.7	1:43.6	+6.7	13
14	17	(France) Maurice Trintignant	Lola-Climax	1:43.0	1:41.3	1:48.9	+7.0	14
15	15	(New Zealand) Chris Amon	Lola-Climax	1:43.8	1:41.4	—	+7.1	DNS ^{1}
16	24	(France) Bernard Collomb	Lotus-Climax	1:46.8	1:43.3	1:44.9	+9.0	DNQ ^{2}
17	3	(Australia) Jack Brabham	Lotus-Climax	1:44.7	No time	No time	+10.4	15

^1 - Before the last qualifying session, Chris Amon was instructed to hand his car over to Maurice Trintignant, who had a guaranteed starting berth, but had suffered terminal issues with his own car.

^2 - Despite the withdrawal of Chris Amon, Bernard Collomb did not qualify for the 16th and final spot on the grid, as his fastest lap time was not close enough to a 1:40 benchmark set by the organizers.

Drivers that had a guaranteed start as former winners of the World Championship or the Monaco Grand Prix.

=== Race ===
Pos	No	Driver	Constructor	Laps	Time/Retired	Grid	Points
1	6	(United Kingdom) Graham Hill	BRM	100	2:41:49.7	2	9
2	5	(United States) Richie Ginther	BRM	100	+ 4.6	4	6
3	7	(New Zealand) Bruce McLaren	Cooper-Climax	100	+ 12.8	8	4
4	21	(United Kingdom) John Surtees	Ferrari	100	+ 14.1	3	3
5	8	(South Africa) Tony Maggs	Cooper-Climax	98	+ 2 laps	10	2
6	10	(United Kingdom) Trevor Taylor	Lotus-Climax	98	+ 2 laps	9	1
7	11	(Sweden) Jo Bonnier	Cooper-Climax	94	+ 6 laps	11	
8	9	(United Kingdom) Jim Clark	Lotus-Climax	78	Gearbox	1	
9	3	(Australia) Jack Brabham	Lotus-Climax	77	Gearbox	16	
Ret	14	(United Kingdom) Innes Ireland	Lotus-BRM	40	Accident	5	
Ret	20	(Belgium) Willy Mairesse	Ferrari	37	Gearbox	7	
Ret	17	(France) Maurice Trintignant	Lola-Climax	34	Clutch	14	
Ret	4	(United States) Dan Gurney	Brabham-Climax	25	Differential	6	
Ret	12	(United States) Jim Hall	Lotus-BRM	20	Gearbox	13	
Ret	25	(Switzerland) Jo Siffert	Lotus-BRM	3	Engine	12	
DNS	15	(New Zealand) Chris Amon	Lola-Climax		Trintignant raced car	(15)	
DNQ	24	(France) Bernard Collomb	Lotus-Climax				
WD	1	(United States) Phil Hill	ATS		Car not ready		
WD	2	(Italy) Giancarlo Baghetti	ATS		Car not ready		
WD	16	(United Kingdom) John Campbell-Jones	Lotus-BRM		Gearbox damaged		
WD	18	(United Kingdom) Ian Burgess	Scirocco-BRM		Car not ready		
WD	19	(United States) Tony Settember	Scirocco-BRM		Car not ready		
WD	22	(Argentina) Nasif Estéfano	De Tomaso				
WD	23	(Italy) Lorenzo Bandini	BRM		Car repossessed by BRM		
WD	24	(Netherlands) Carel Godin de Beaufort	Porsche				

== Notes ==
- This was the Formula One World Championship debut for New Zealand driver Chris Amon.

== Championship standings after the race ==
Drivers' Championship standings

Pos	Driver	Points
1	(United Kingdom) Graham Hill	9
2	(United States) Richie Ginther	6
3	(New Zealand) Bruce McLaren	4
4	(United Kingdom) John Surtees	3
5	(South Africa) Tony Maggs	2

Constructors' Championship standings

Pos	Constructor	Points
1	(United Kingdom) BRM	9
2	(United Kingdom) Cooper-Climax	4
3	(Italy) Ferrari	3
4	(United Kingdom) Lotus-Climax	1

- Notes: Only the top five positions are included for both sets of standings.

Previous race: 1962 South African Grand Prix	FIA Formula One World Championship; 1963 season	Next race: 1963 Belgian Grand Prix
Previous race: 1962 Monaco Grand Prix	Monaco Grand Prix	Next race: 1964 Monaco Grand Prix
Previous race: 1962 Dutch Grand Prix	European Grand Prix (Designated European Grand Prix)	Next race: 1964 British Grand Prix
