= 1965 Mexican Grand Prix =

Race details
- Date: October 24, 1965
- Official name: IV Gran Premio de Mexico
- Location: Ciudad Deportiva Magdalena Mixhuca, Mexico City, Mexico
- Course: Permanent racing facility
- Course length: 5.000 km (3.107 miles)
- Distance: 65 laps, 325.000 km (201.946 miles)

Pole position
Driver	(United Kingdom) Jim Clark	Lotus-Climax
- Time: 1:56.17

Fastest lap
Driver	(United States) Dan Gurney	Brabham-Climax
- Time: 1:55.84 on lap 57

Podium
First	(United States) Richie Ginther	Honda
Second	(United States) Dan Gurney	Brabham-Climax
Third	(United Kingdom) Mike Spence	Lotus-Climax

The 1965 Mexican Grand Prix was a Formula One motor race held at Ciudad Deportiva Magdalena Mixhuca in Mexico City on October 24, 1965. It was race 10 of 10 in both the 1965 World Championship of Drivers and the 1965 International Cup for Formula One Manufacturers. The race was won by Richie Ginther, who took his first and only victory, first for the Honda team and, excluding the Indianapolis 500, first win for the non-European team, after leading for the entire race. The Brabham-Climax of Dan Gurney finished the race second and the Lotus-Climax of Mike Spence completed the podium.

== Race report ==
The Mexican Grand Prix provided a host of new records - the last race of the 1500cc era was the only one of the season not to be won by a British-powered car and also the only race not to be won by a British driver. Honda's testing proved to be of benefit as Jim Clark and Graham Hill dropped out with engine problems and Jackie Stewart retired with clutch problems to leave Dan Gurney as the only challenger to Richie Ginther. Lorenzo Bandini and Pedro Rodríguez collided at the hairpin, leaving Ginther to stroll home for Honda's first, and his only, Grand Prix win. Goodyear also bowed out of Formula One in winning form. Gurney and Mike Spence took the other podium places, with Jo Siffert, Ronnie Bucknum and Richard Attwood completing the points scorers.

== Classification ==
=== Qualifying ===
Pos	No	Driver	Constructor	Time	Gap
1	5	(United Kingdom) Jim Clark	Lotus-Climax	1:56.17	—
2	8	(United States) Dan Gurney	Brabham-Climax	1:56.24	+0.07
3	11	(United States) Richie Ginther	Honda	1:56.48	+0.31
4	7	(Australia) Jack Brabham	Brabham-Climax	1:56.78	+0.61
5	3	(United Kingdom) Graham Hill	BRM	1:57.06	+0.89
6	6	(United Kingdom) Mike Spence	Lotus-Climax	1:57.22	+1.05
7	2	(Italy) Lorenzo Bandini	Ferrari	1:57.31	+1.14
8	4	(United Kingdom) Jackie Stewart	BRM	1:57.53	+1.36
9	18	(Mexico) Moisés Solana	Lotus-Climax	1:57.55	+1.38
10	12	(United States) Ronnie Bucknum	Honda	1:57.88	+1.71
11	16	(Switzerland) Jo Siffert	Brabham-BRM	1:57.94	+1.77
12	15	(Sweden) Jo Bonnier	Brabham-Climax	1:58.22	+2.05
13	24	(Italy) Ludovico Scarfiotti	Ferrari	1:58.93	+2.76
14	14	(Mexico) Pedro Rodríguez	Ferrari	1:59.06	+2.89
15	9	(New Zealand) Bruce McLaren	Cooper-Climax	1:59.15	+2.98
16	10	(Austria) Jochen Rindt	Cooper-Climax	1:59.30	+3.13
17	21	(United Kingdom) Richard Attwood	Lotus-BRM	2:00.61	+4.44
18	22	(United States) Bob Bondurant	Lotus-BRM	2:00.80	+4.63
19	22	(United Kingdom) Innes Ireland	Lotus-BRM	2:02.36	+6.19

=== Race ===
Pos	No	Driver	Constructor	Laps	Time/Retired	Grid	Points
1	11	(United States) Richie Ginther	Honda	65	2:08:32.10	3	9
2	8	(United States) Dan Gurney	Brabham-Climax	65	+2.89 secs	2	6
3	6	(United Kingdom) Mike Spence	Lotus-Climax	65	+1:00.15	6	4
4	16	(Switzerland) Jo Siffert	Brabham-BRM	65	+1:54.42	11	3
5	12	(United States) Ronnie Bucknum	Honda	64	+1 Lap	10	2
6	21	(United Kingdom) Richard Attwood	Lotus-BRM	64	+1 Lap	16	1
7	14	(Mexico) Pedro Rodríguez	Ferrari	62	+3 Laps	13	
8	2	(Italy) Lorenzo Bandini	Ferrari	62	+3 Laps	7	
Ret	3	(United Kingdom) Graham Hill	BRM	56	Engine	5	
Ret	18	(Mexico) Moisés Solana	Lotus-Climax	55	Ignition	9	
Ret	15	(Sweden) Jo Bonnier	Brabham-Climax	43	Suspension	12	
Ret	10	(Austria) Jochen Rindt	Cooper-Climax	39	Ignition	15	
Ret	7	(Australia) Jack Brabham	Brabham-Climax	38	Oil Leak	4	
Ret	4	(United Kingdom) Jackie Stewart	BRM	35	Clutch	8	
Ret	22	(United States) Bob Bondurant	Lotus-BRM	29	Suspension	17	
Ret	9	(New Zealand) Bruce McLaren	Cooper-Climax	25	Gearbox	14	
Ret	5	(United Kingdom) Jim Clark	Lotus-Climax	8	Engine	1	
DNS	22	(United Kingdom) Innes Ireland	Lotus-BRM		Car given to Bondurant		
DNS	24	(Italy) Ludovico Scarfiotti	Ferrari		Car given to Rodríguez		

== Notes ==
- This marked Richie Ginther's first and only Grand Prix win.
- It was the first Formula One World Championship Grand Prix win and podium for Honda, for a Honda-powered car, and for a Japanese/Asian manufacturer and engine supplier.
- This was the first race victory for the tyre supplier Goodyear in Formula One.

== Final Championship standings ==
- **Bold text** indicates the World Champions.

Drivers' Championship standings

Pos	Driver	Points
1	(United Kingdom) **Jim Clark**	54
2	(United Kingdom) Graham Hill	40 (47)
3	(United Kingdom) Jackie Stewart	33 (34)
4	(United States) Dan Gurney	25
5	(United Kingdom) John Surtees	17

Constructors' Championship standings

	Pos	Constructor	Points
	1	(United Kingdom) **Lotus-Climax**	54 (58)
	2	(United Kingdom) BRM	45 (61)
1	3	(United Kingdom) Brabham-Climax	27 (31)
1	4	(Italy) Ferrari	26 (27)
	5	(United Kingdom) Cooper-Climax	14

- Notes: Only the top five positions are included for both sets of standings. Only best 6 results counted toward the championship. Numbers without parentheses are championship points, numbers in parentheses are total points scored.

Previous race: 1965 United States Grand Prix	FIA Formula One World Championship; 1965 season	Next race: 1966 Monaco Grand Prix
Previous race: 1964 Mexican Grand Prix	Mexican Grand Prix	Next race: 1966 Mexican Grand Prix
