= 1964 British Grand Prix =

Formula One motor race held in 1964

Race details
- Date: 11 July 1964
- Official name: XVII RAC British Grand Prix
- Location: Brands Hatch; Kent, England
- Course: Permanent racing facility
- Course length: 4.265 km (2.651 mi)
- Distance: 80 laps, 341.200 km (212.057 mi)
- Weather: Warm, dry

Pole position
Driver	(United Kingdom) Jim Clark	Lotus-Climax
- Time: 1:38.1

Fastest lap
Driver	(United Kingdom) Jim Clark	Lotus-Climax
- Time: 1:38.8 on lap 73

Podium
First	(United Kingdom) Jim Clark	Lotus-Climax
Second	(United Kingdom) Graham Hill	BRM
Third	(United Kingdom) John Surtees	Ferrari

The 1964 British Grand Prix was a Formula One motor race held at Brands Hatch on 11 July 1964. The event was also designated as the European Grand Prix. It was race 5 of 10 in both the 1964 World Championship of Drivers and the 1964 International Cup for Formula One Manufacturers. The first of twelve British Grands Prix to be held at the southern England circuit, it would alternate with Silverstone until 1987. The race was won by Jim Clark driving a Lotus 25.

== Classification ==
=== Qualifying ===
Pos	No	Driver	Constructor	Qualifying times		Gap
Pos	No	Driver	Constructor	Q1	Q2	Gap
1	1	(United Kingdom) Jim Clark	Lotus-Climax	1:38.8	1:38.1	—
2	3	(United Kingdom) Graham Hill	BRM	1:39.0	1:38.3	+0.2
3	6	(United States) Dan Gurney	Brabham-Climax	1:38.4	1:38.4	+0.3
4	5	(Australia) Jack Brabham	Brabham-Climax	1:38.8	1:38.5	+0.4
5	7	(United Kingdom) John Surtees	Ferrari	1:39.0	1:38.7	+0.6
6	9	(New Zealand) Bruce McLaren	Cooper-Climax	1:39.6	1:39.8	+1.5
7	19	(United Kingdom) Bob Anderson	Brabham-Climax	1:42.8	1:39.8	+1.7
8	8	(Italy) Lorenzo Bandini	Ferrari	No time	1:40.2	+2.1
9	16	(Sweden) Jo Bonnier	Brabham-BRM	1:43.4	1:40.2	+2.1
10	11	(United Kingdom) Innes Ireland	BRP-BRM	1:42.2	1:40.8	+2.7
11	15	(New Zealand) Chris Amon	Lotus-BRM	1:42.4	1:41.2	+3.1
12	14	(United Kingdom) Mike Hailwood	Lotus-BRM	1:41.4	1:42.4	+3.3
13	2	(United Kingdom) Mike Spence	Lotus-Climax	1:42.0	1:41.4	+3.3
14	4	(United States) Richie Ginther	BRM	1:42.2	1:41.6	+3.5
15	10	(United States) Phil Hill	Cooper-Climax	1:57.8	1:42.6	+4.5
16	20	(Switzerland) Jo Siffert	Brabham-BRM	1:43.2	1:42.8	+4.7
17	23	(United Kingdom) Ian Raby	Brabham-BRM	1:43.4	1:42.8	+4.7
18	12	(United Kingdom) Trevor Taylor	Lotus-BRM	1:42.8	1:42.8	+4.7
19	26	(Australia) Frank Gardner	Brabham-Ford	No time	1:43.0	+4.9
20	22	(United Kingdom) John Taylor	Cooper-Ford	1:44.0	1:43.2	+5.1
21	18	(Italy) Giancarlo Baghetti	BRM	1:44.2	1:43.4	+5.3
22	24	(United States) Peter Revson	Lotus-BRM	1:48.4	1:43.4	+5.3
23	17	(South Africa) Tony Maggs	BRM	1:45.0	1:45.4	+6.9
24	21	(United Kingdom) Richard Attwood	BRM	No time	1:45.2	+7.1
25	25	(France) Maurice Trintignant	BRM	1:54.4	No time	+16.3

=== Race ===
Pos	No	Driver	Constructor	Laps	Time/Retired	Grid	Points
1	1	(United Kingdom) Jim Clark	Lotus-Climax	80	2:15:07.0	1	9
2	3	(United Kingdom) Graham Hill	BRM	80	+ 2.8	2	6
3	7	(United Kingdom) John Surtees	Ferrari	80	+ 1:20.6	5	4
4	5	(Australia) Jack Brabham	Brabham-Climax	79	+ 1 lap	4	3
5	8	(Italy) Lorenzo Bandini	Ferrari	78	+ 2 laps	8	2
6	10	(United States) Phil Hill	Cooper-Climax	78	+ 2 laps	15	1
7	19	(United Kingdom) Bob Anderson	Brabham-Climax	78	+ 2 laps	7	
8	4	(United States) Richie Ginther	BRM	77	+ 3 laps	14	
9	2	(United Kingdom) Mike Spence	Lotus-Climax	77	+ 3 laps	13	
10	11	(United Kingdom) Innes Ireland	BRP-BRM	77	+ 3 laps	10	
11	20	(Switzerland) Jo Siffert	Brabham-BRM	76	+ 4 laps	16	
12	18	(Italy) Giancarlo Baghetti	BRM	76	+ 4 laps	21	
13	6	(United States) Dan Gurney	Brabham-Climax	75	+ 5 laps	3	
14	22	(United Kingdom) John Taylor	Cooper-Ford	56	+ 24 laps	20	
Ret	16	(Sweden) Jo Bonnier	Brabham-BRM	46	Brakes	9	
Ret	24	(United States) Peter Revson	Lotus-BRM	43	Differential	22	
Ret	23	(United Kingdom) Ian Raby	Brabham-BRM	37	Rear axle	17	
Ret	17	(South Africa) Tony Maggs	BRM	37	Gearbox	23	
Ret	12	(United Kingdom) Trevor Taylor	Lotus-BRM	23	Unwell	18	
Ret	14	(United Kingdom) Mike Hailwood	Lotus-BRM	16	Oil pipe	12	
Ret	15	(New Zealand) Chris Amon	Lotus-BRM	9	Clutch	11	
Ret	9	(New Zealand) Bruce McLaren	Cooper-Climax	7	Gearbox	6	
Ret	26	(Australia) Frank Gardner	Brabham-Ford	0	Accident	19	
DNS	21	(United Kingdom) Richard Attwood	BRM		Withdrawn		
DNQ	25	(France) Maurice Trintignant	BRM				

== Notes ==
- This was the Formula One World Championship debut race for British drivers Richard Attwood, John Taylor and Australian driver Frank Gardner.
- This was Jim Clark's third British Grand Prix win, breaking the record of two British Grand Prix wins set by Alberto Ascari at the 1953 British Grand Prix.

== Championship standings after the race ==
Drivers' Championship standings

	Pos	Driver	Points
	1	(United Kingdom) Jim Clark	30
	2	(United Kingdom) Graham Hill	26
	3	(United States) Richie Ginther	11
	4=	(United Kingdom) Peter Arundell	11
1	4=	(Australia) Jack Brabham	11

Constructors' Championship standings

	Pos	Constructor	Points
	1	(United Kingdom) Lotus-Climax	34
	2	(United Kingdom) BRM	27
	3	(United Kingdom) Brabham-Climax	17
1	4=	(Italy) Ferrari	10
1	4=	(United Kingdom) Cooper-Climax	10

- Notes: Only the top five positions are included for both sets of standings.

Previous race: 1964 French Grand Prix	FIA Formula One World Championship; 1964 season	Next race: 1964 German Grand Prix
Previous race: 1963 British Grand Prix	British Grand Prix	Next race: 1965 British Grand Prix
Previous race: 1963 Monaco Grand Prix	European Grand Prix (Designated European Grand Prix)	Next race: 1965 Belgian Grand Prix
