= 1964 Italian Grand Prix =

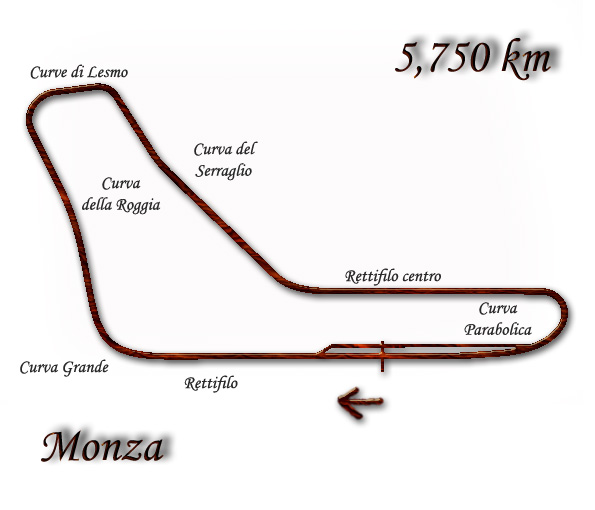

Race details
- Date: 6 September 1964
- Official name: XXXV Gran Premio d'Italia
- Location: Autodromo Nazionale di Monza; Monza, Italy
- Course: Permanent racing facility
- Course length: 5.750 km (3.573 mi)
- Distance: 78 laps, 448.5 km (278.685 mi)
- Weather: Dry

Pole position
Driver	(United Kingdom) John Surtees	Ferrari
- Time: 1:37.4

Fastest lap
Driver	(United Kingdom) John Surtees	Ferrari
- Time: 1:38.8 on lap 63

Podium
First	(United Kingdom) John Surtees	Ferrari
Second	(New Zealand) Bruce McLaren	Cooper-Climax
Third	(Italy) Lorenzo Bandini	Ferrari

The 1964 Italian Grand Prix was a Formula One motor race held at the Autodromo Nazionale di Monza on 6 September 1964. It was race 8 of 10 in both the 1964 World Championship of Drivers and the 1964 International Cup for Formula One Manufacturers. The 78-lap race was won by Ferrari driver John Surtees after he started from pole position. Bruce McLaren finished second for the Cooper team and Ferrari driver Lorenzo Bandini came in third.

== Classification ==
=== Qualifying ===
Pos	No	Driver	Constructor	Time	Gap
1	2	(United Kingdom) John Surtees	Ferrari	1:37.4	—
2	16	(United States) Dan Gurney	Brabham-Climax	1:38.2	+0.8
3	18	(United Kingdom) Graham Hill	BRM	1:38.7	+1.3
4	8	(United Kingdom) Jim Clark	Lotus-Climax	1:39.1	+1.7
5	26	(New Zealand) Bruce McLaren	Cooper-Climax	1:39.4	+2.0
6	12	(Switzerland) Jo Siffert	Brabham-BRM	1:39.7	+2.3
7	4	(Italy) Lorenzo Bandini	Ferrari	1:39.8	+2.4
8	10	(United Kingdom) Mike Spence	Lotus-Climax	1:40.3	+2.9
9	20	(United States) Richie Ginther	BRM	1:40.4	+3.0
10	28	(United States) Ronnie Bucknum	Honda	1:40.4	+3.0
11	14	(Australia) Jack Brabham	Brabham-Climax	1:40.8	+3.4
12	34	(Sweden) Jo Bonnier	Brabham-Climax	1:41.0	+3.6
13	46	(United Kingdom) Innes Ireland	BRP-BRM	1:41.0	+3.6
14	22	(United Kingdom) Bob Anderson	Brabham-Climax	1:41.3	+3.9
15	30	(Italy) Giancarlo Baghetti	BRM	1:41.4	+4.0
16	6	(Italy) Ludovico Scarfiotti	Ferrari	1:41.6	+4.2
17	40	(United Kingdom) Mike Hailwood	Lotus-BRM	1:41.6	+4.2
18	38	(United States) Peter Revson	Lotus-BRM	1:42.0	+4.6
19	50	(Portugal) Mário de Araújo Cabral	ATS	1:42.6	+5.2
20	60	(Switzerland) Jean-Claude Rudaz	Cooper-Climax	1:43.0	+5.6
21	48	(France) Maurice Trintignant	BRM	1:43.3	+5.9
22	44	(United Kingdom) Trevor Taylor	BRP-BRM	1:43.8	+6.4
23	36	(Italy) Geki	Brabham-BRM	1:44.1	+6.7
24	24	(Rhodesia) John Love	Cooper-Climax	1:48.5	+11.1
25	56	(United Kingdom) Ian Raby	Brabham-BRM	1:52.2	+14.8

=== Race ===
Pos	No	Driver	Constructor	Laps	Time/Retired	Grid	Points
1	2	(United Kingdom) John Surtees	Ferrari	78	2:10:51.8	1	9
2	26	(New Zealand) Bruce McLaren	Cooper-Climax	78	+ 1:06.0	5	6
3	4	(Italy) Lorenzo Bandini	Ferrari	77	+ 1 lap	7	4
4	20	(United States) Richie Ginther	BRM	77	+ 1 lap	9	3
5	46	(United Kingdom) Innes Ireland	BRP-BRM	77	+ 1 lap	13	2
6	10	(United Kingdom) Mike Spence	Lotus-Climax	77	+ 1 lap	8	1
7	12	(Switzerland) Jo Siffert	Brabham-BRM	77	+ 1 lap	6	
8	30	(Italy) Giancarlo Baghetti	BRM	77	+ 1 lap	15	
9	6	(Italy) Ludovico Scarfiotti	Ferrari	77	+ 1 lap	16	
10	16	(United States) Dan Gurney	Brabham-Climax	75	+ 3 laps	2	
11	22	(United Kingdom) Bob Anderson	Brabham-Climax	75	+ 3 laps	14	
12	34	(Sweden) Jo Bonnier	Brabham-Climax	74	+ 4 laps	12	
13	38	(United States) Peter Revson	Lotus-BRM	72	+ 6 laps	18	
14	14	(Australia) Jack Brabham	Brabham-Climax	59	Engine/Connecting rod	11	
Ret	8	(United Kingdom) Jim Clark	Lotus-Climax	27	Engine	4	
Ret	50	(Portugal) Mário de Araújo Cabral	ATS	24	Ignition	19	
Ret	48	(France) Maurice Trintignant	BRM	21	Injection	20	
Ret	28	(United States) Ronnie Bucknum	Honda	12	Brakes	10	
Ret	40	(United Kingdom) Mike Hailwood	Lotus-BRM	4	Engine	17	
Ret	18	(United Kingdom) Graham Hill	BRM	0	Clutch	3	
DNS	60	(Switzerland) Jean-Claude Rudaz	Cooper-Climax				
DNQ	44	(United Kingdom) Trevor Taylor	BRP-BRM				
DNQ	36	(Italy) Geki	Brabham-BRM				
DNQ	24	(Rhodesia) John Love	Cooper-Climax				
DNQ	56	(United Kingdom) Ian Raby	Brabham-BRM				

Jean-Claude Rudaz, who had qualified 20th fastest, was unable to start the race after blowing up his engine and was replaced by Maurice Trintignant, who had qualified 21st fastest. This was the final start of Trintignant's 15 year Formula 1 career.

== Notes ==
- This was the Formula One World Championship debut race for Italian driver Geki and Swiss driver Jean-Claude Rudaz.
- This was the fifth win of the Italian Grand Prix for home team Ferrari. At Monza Ferrari had 5 wins, 21 podiums, 7 pole positions and 7 fastest laps.

== Championship standings after the race ==
Drivers' Championship standings

Pos	Driver	Points
1	(United Kingdom) Graham Hill	32
2	(United Kingdom) Jim Clark	30
3	(United Kingdom) John Surtees	28
4	(United States) Richie Ginther	20
5	(Italy) Lorenzo Bandini	19

Constructors' Championship standings

	Pos	Constructor	Points
2	1	(Italy) Ferrari	37
1	2	(United Kingdom) BRM	36 (42)
1	3	(United Kingdom) Lotus-Climax	35
	4	(United Kingdom) Brabham-Climax	21
	5	(United Kingdom) Cooper-Climax	16

- Notes: Only the top five positions are included for both sets of standings. Only best 6 results counted toward the championship. Numbers without parentheses are championship points, numbers in parentheses are total points scored.

Previous race: 1964 Austrian Grand Prix	FIA Formula One World Championship; 1964 season	Next race: 1964 United States Grand Prix
Previous race: 1963 Italian Grand Prix	Italian Grand Prix	Next race: 1965 Italian Grand Prix
