= 1964 German Grand Prix =

Race details
- Date: 2 August 1964
- Official name: XXVI Grosser Preis von Deutschland
- Location: Nürburgring; Nürburg, West Germany
- Course: Permanent racing facility
- Course length: 22.810 km (14.173 mi)
- Distance: 15 laps, 342.150 km (212.602 mi)
- Weather: Dry

Pole position
Driver	(United Kingdom) John Surtees	Ferrari
- Time: 8:38.4

Fastest lap
Driver	(United Kingdom) John Surtees	Ferrari
- Time: 8:39.0 on lap 11

Podium
First	(United Kingdom) John Surtees	Ferrari
Second	(United Kingdom) Graham Hill	BRM
Third	(Italy) Lorenzo Bandini	Ferrari

The 1964 German Grand Prix was a Formula One motor race held at Nürburgring on 2 August 1964. It was race 6 of 10 in both the 1964 World Championship of Drivers and the 1964 International Cup for Formula One Manufacturers. The 15-lap race was won by Ferrari driver John Surtees after he started from pole position. Graham Hill finished second for the BRM team and Surtees's teammate Lorenzo Bandini came in third. The race was marred by the death of Dutch gentleman racer Carel Godin de Beaufort during practice. The embankment at the Karussell had been eliminated and replaced with grass and a wheel-wide tarmac strip at the bottom of the concrete banking.

== Classification ==
=== Qualifying ===
Pos	No	Driver	Constructor	Qualifying times				Gap
Pos	No	Driver	Constructor	Q1	Q2	Q3	Q4	Gap
1	7	(United Kingdom) John Surtees	Ferrari	8:45.2	8:43.0	8:39.2	8:38.4	
2	1	(United Kingdom) Jim Clark	Lotus-Climax	9:04.1	8:47.9	8:42.2	8:38.8	+0.4
3	5	(United States) Dan Gurney	Brabham-Climax	8:47.8	8:43.2	8:56.1	8:39.3	+0.9
4	8	(Italy) Lorenzo Bandini	Ferrari	8:49.3	8:42.6	9:03.9	10:40.9	+4.2
5	3	(United Kingdom) Graham Hill	BRM	8:44.4	8:44.6	8:43.8	8:46.1	+5.4
6	6	(Australia) Jack Brabham	Brabham-Climax	9:10.6	8:59.6	8:53.1	8:46.6	+8.2
7	9	(New Zealand) Bruce McLaren	Cooper-Climax	9:13.0	8:57.9	9:33.3	8:47.1	+8.7
8	10	(United States) Phil Hill	Cooper-Climax	9:26.1	8:52.7	9:07.3	9:01.8	+14.3
9	14	(New Zealand) Chris Amon	Lotus-BRM	No time	8:54.0	No time	8:54.7	+15.6
10	19	(Switzerland) Jo Siffert	Brabham-BRM	10:04.4	9:02.8	9:05.1	8:56.9	+18.5
11	4	(United States) Richie Ginther	BRM	9:09.4	8:57.9	9:08.4	No time	+19.5
12	11	(Sweden) Jo Bonnier	Brabham-BRM	9:43.3	9:16.5	9:36.7	9:01.3	+22.9
13	15	(United Kingdom) Mike Hailwood	Lotus-BRM	9:21.6	9:08.4	9:26.9	9:01.9	+23.5
14	22	(France) Maurice Trintignant	BRM	9:20.7	9:14.0	9:12.5	9:06.8	+28.4
15	16	(United Kingdom) Bob Anderson	Brabham-Climax	9:19.0	9:07.5	10:25.7	No time	+29.1
16	26	(South Africa) Tony Maggs	BRM	10:07.7	9:18.7	9:59.9	9:09.6	+31.2
17	2	(United Kingdom) Mike Spence	Lotus-Climax	9:31.9	9:09.9	9:21.5	9:13.0	+31.5
18	27	(United States) Peter Revson	Lotus-BRM	9:50.9	9:50.9	9:23.9	9:13.0	+34.6
19	23	(West Germany) Gerhard Mitter	Lotus-Climax	No time	No time	No time	9:14.1	+35.7
20	12	(West Germany) Edgar Barth	Cooper-Climax	10:33.6	9:27.1	9:38.0	9:14.2	+35.8
21	18	(Italy) Giancarlo Baghetti	BRM	9:38.8	9:33.1	9:34.9	9:14.6	+36.2
22	20	(United States) Ronnie Bucknum	Honda	10:04.1	9:34.3	No time	No time	+55.9
23	29	(Netherlands) Carel Godin de Beaufort	Porsche	No time	9:52.4	9:37.9	9:40.4	+59.5
24	28	(Belgium) André Pilette	Scirocco-Climax	No time	10:29.4	13:45.2	10:30.1	+1:51.0

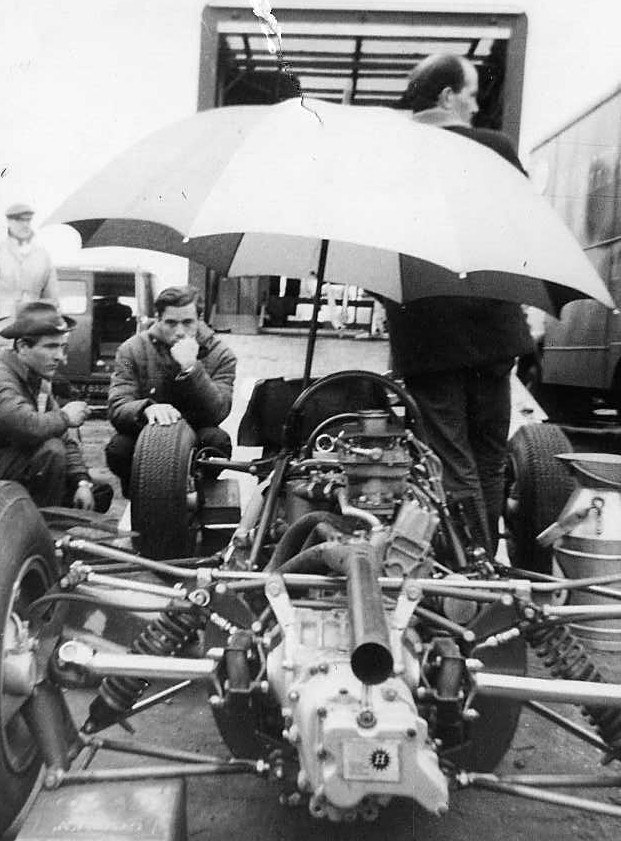
Jim Clark in the pits

=== Race ===
Pos	No	Driver	Constructor	Laps	Time/Retired	Grid	Points
1	7	(United Kingdom) John Surtees	Ferrari	15	2:12:04.8	1	9
2	3	(United Kingdom) Graham Hill	BRM	15	+ 1:15.6	5	6
3	8	(Italy) Lorenzo Bandini	Ferrari	15	+ 4:52.8	4	4
4	19	(Switzerland) Jo Siffert	Brabham-BRM	15	+ 5:23.1	10	3
5	22	(France) Maurice Trintignant	BRM	14	Battery	14	2
6	26	(South Africa) Tony Maggs	BRM	14	+ 1 lap	16	1
7	4	(United States) Richie Ginther	BRM	14	+ 1 lap	11	
8	2	(United Kingdom) Mike Spence	Lotus-Climax	14	+ 1 lap	17	
9	23	(West Germany) Gerhard Mitter	Lotus-Climax	14	+ 1 lap	19	
10	5	(United States) Dan Gurney	Brabham-Climax	14	+ 1 lap	3	
11	14	(New Zealand) Chris Amon	Lotus-BRM	12	Suspension	9	
12	6	(Australia) Jack Brabham	Brabham-Climax	11	Transmission	6	
13	20	(United States) Ronnie Bucknum	Honda	11	Accident	22	
14	27	(United States) Peter Revson	Lotus-BRM	10	Accident	18	
Ret	1	(United Kingdom) Jim Clark	Lotus-Climax	7	Engine/Valve	2	
Ret	9	(New Zealand) Bruce McLaren	Cooper-Climax	4	Engine/Valve	7	
Ret	16	(United Kingdom) Bob Anderson	Brabham-Climax	4	Suspension	15	
Ret	12	(West Germany) Edgar Barth	Cooper-Climax	3	Clutch	20	
Ret	18	(Italy) Giancarlo Baghetti	BRM	2	Throttle	21	
Ret	10	(United States) Phil Hill	Cooper-Climax	1	Engine	8	
Ret	15	(United Kingdom) Mike Hailwood	Lotus-BRM	0	Engine	13	
Ret	11	(Sweden) Jo Bonnier	Brabham-BRM	0	Ignition	12	
DNS	29	(Netherlands) Carel Godin de Beaufort	Porsche		Fatal accident during qualifying		
DNQ	28	(Belgium) André Pilette	Scirocco-Climax				

== Notes ==
- This was the Formula One World Championship debut race for American driver Ronnie Bucknum.
- This race marked the 50th Formula One World Championship Grand Prix win for a British driver.
- This race marked the Formula One World Championship debut for Honda; the first Japanese and Asian constructor and engine supplier in Formula One.

== Championship standings after the race ==
Drivers' Championship standings

	Pos	Driver	Points
1	1	(United Kingdom) Graham Hill	32
1	2	(United Kingdom) Jim Clark	30
4	3	(United Kingdom) John Surtees	19
1	4	(United States) Richie Ginther	11
1	5=	(United Kingdom) Peter Arundell	11
1	5=	(Australia) Jack Brabham	11

Constructors' Championship standings

	Pos	Constructor	Points
	1	(United Kingdom) Lotus-Climax	34
	2	(United Kingdom) BRM	33
1	3	(Italy) Ferrari	19
1	4	(United Kingdom) Brabham-Climax	17
	5	(United Kingdom) Cooper-Climax	10

- Notes: Only the top five positions are included for both sets of standings.

Previous race: 1964 British Grand Prix	FIA Formula One World Championship; 1964 season	Next race: 1964 Austrian Grand Prix
Previous race: 1963 German Grand Prix	German Grand Prix	Next race: 1965 German Grand Prix
