= 1964 United States Grand Prix =

Race details
- Date: 4 October 1964
- Official name: VII United States Grand Prix
- Location: Watkins Glen Grand Prix Race Course; Watkins Glen, New York, United States
- Course: Permanent road course
- Course length: 3.701 km (2.300 mi)
- Distance: 110 laps, 407.110 km (252.966 mi)
- Weather: Sunny, warm

Pole position
Driver	(United Kingdom) Jim Clark	Lotus-Climax
- Time: 1:12.65

Fastest lap
Driver	(United Kingdom) Jim Clark	Lotus-Climax
- Time: 1:12.7 on lap 81

Podium
First	(United Kingdom) Graham Hill	BRM
Second	(United Kingdom) John Surtees	Ferrari
Third	(Switzerland) Jo Siffert	Brabham-BRM

The 1964 United States Grand Prix was a Formula One motor race held on October 4, 1964, at the Watkins Glen Grand Prix Race Course in Watkins Glen, New York. It was race 9 of 10 in both the 1964 World Championship of Drivers and the 1964 International Cup for Formula One Manufacturers. The 110-lap race was won by BRM driver Graham Hill after he started from fourth position. John Surtees finished second for the Ferrari team and Brabham driver Jo Siffert came in third.

== Summary ==
Graham Hill padded his tenuous lead in the 1964 Drivers' Championship over John Surtees and Jim Clark by bringing his BRM home first at The Glen for the second straight year. Surtees was second for Ferrari, 30.5 seconds back.

The Ferrari team brought four cars for Surtees and Lorenzo Bandini, but they were not in the usual "flaming red" that the race program advertised. Enzo Ferrari had surrendered his entrant's license in a dispute at Monza, so the cars were entered by Luigi Chinetti's North American Racing Team and were painted in North American racing blue and white. The only entrant missing from the 20 who were invited was American A. J. Foyt, who was offered a works BRM drive for the race, but decided against it.

The Watkins Glen Grand Prix Corporation was so pleased with the new track surface that had been laid down that they believed a 120 mph (about 193 km/h) lap (1:08.9) was possible, and they had 120 bottles of champagne ready for the first one to do it. While the three remaining Championship contenders, along with American Dan Gurney, waged a stirring battle for the pole and broke Hill's record from the previous year, they did not come close to claiming the prize.

Colin Chapman had both an older Type 25 and the new Type 33 Lotus for Clark, but the Scot had little time to practice in the newer version by the time it was ready. He set the fastest time (1:12.65) using the old, reliable one, anyway, so he decided to use it in the race. Surtees, Gurney and Hill were all under 1:13, as well, followed by Bruce McLaren and Clark's teammate, Mike Spence.

Cool breezes and bright sun welcomed a crowd of 65,000 on Sunday to see the next to last round of a tense Championship battle. Hill led Clark by two points, with Surtees, having won two of the three previous races, just two points behind Clark in third. Clark led off the line, but Surtees and Spence quickly went past, dropping the defending Champion to third before they reached the top of the hill. After one lap, the order was Surtees, Spence, Hill, Clark, Jack Brabham, Innes Ireland, Gurney and McLaren.

Gurney quickly recovered from his poor start by getting around Ireland and Brabham. Hill briefly overtook Spence for second spot, but then Clark seemed to take the bit between his teeth. The Scot surged past the BRM of Hill and set off after Surtees, taking the lead from the Ferrari on lap 13 as they exited the right-hander before the pits. For the next 18 laps, Clark continually drew away from Surtees. Gurney passed Spence to pursue Hill for third place, until Hill moved into second place by getting around Surtees on lap 31.

On lap 40, Clark's Lotus began to misfire as a result of a fuel injection problem. Surtees, then Hill and Gurney, went by before he entered the pits on lap 44. The crew spent two laps adjusting the injection system, and he rejoined in next to last spot, but stopped again after only six laps. Chapman called teammate Spence in from fourth place and replaced him with Clark, in the hopes that Clark could get ahead of Hill and Surtees and reduce the number of points they could earn. Spence continued in Clark's car, but retired it after five more laps.

Meanwhile, Hill had taken the lead back from Surtees on lap 45. When the leaders came up to lap Hill's teammate, American Richie Ginther, on lap 61, Hill's BRM seemed to have much less trouble getting by than the pursuing Ferrari and Brabham did. Surtees and Gurney got by Ginther after another lap, but by then, Hill was fifty yards ahead and pulling away. Two laps later, Surtees spun while lapping another backmarker, and on lap 70, Gurney retired from second place with a broken Climax engine.

Clark was now in third, gaining on Hill by a second per lap and nearly matching his qualifying time, until the second Lotus also began sputtering, this time unable to pick up its last few gallons of fuel. He retired, having completed 102 laps, and was eventually classified seventh, out of the points. At the end, Hill and Surtees had the only healthy cars, and the Englishman claimed his second win of the season, now five points ahead of Surtees and nine ahead of Clark in the Championship standings. Jo Siffert was third in the Rob Walker-entered Brabham, ahead of Americans Richie Ginther and Walt Hansgen, with Trevor Taylor in sixth, scoring his only point of the season.

== Classification ==
=== Qualifying ===
Pos	No	Driver	Constructor	Time	Gap
1	1	(United Kingdom) Jim Clark	Lotus-Climax	1:12.65	—
2	7	(United Kingdom) John Surtees	Ferrari	1:12.78	+0.13
3	6	(United States) Dan Gurney	Brabham-Climax	1:12.90	+0.25
4	3	(United Kingdom) Graham Hill	BRM	1:12.92	+0.27
5	9	(New Zealand) Bruce McLaren	Cooper-Climax	1:13.10	+0.45
6	2	(United Kingdom) Mike Spence	Lotus-Climax	1:13.33	+0.68
7	5	(Australia) Jack Brabham	Brabham-Climax	1:13.63	+0.98
8	8	(Italy) Lorenzo Bandini	Ferrari	1:13.85	+1.20
9	16	(Sweden) Jo Bonnier	Brabham-Climax	1:14.07	+1.42
10	11	(United Kingdom) Innes Ireland	BRP-BRM	1:14.35	+1.70
11	15	(New Zealand) Chris Amon	Lotus-BRM	1:14.43	+1.78
12	22	(Switzerland) Jo Siffert	Brabham-BRM	1:14.65	+2.00
13	4	(United States) Richie Ginther	BRM	1:14.67	+2.02
14	25	(United States) Ronnie Bucknum	Honda	1:14.90	+2.25
15	12	(United Kingdom) Trevor Taylor	BRP-BRM	1:15.30	+2.65
16	14	(United Kingdom) Mike Hailwood	Lotus-BRM	1:15.65	+3.00
17	17	(United States) Walt Hansgen	Lotus-Climax	1:15.90	+3.25
18	23	(United States) Hap Sharp	Brabham-BRM	1:18.23	+5.58
19	10	(United States) Phil Hill	Cooper-Climax	1:19.63	+6.98

=== Race ===
Pos	No	Driver	Constructor	Laps	Time/Retired	Grid	Points
1	3	(United Kingdom) Graham Hill	BRM	110	2:16:38.0	4	9
2	7	(United Kingdom) John Surtees	Ferrari	110	+30.5	2	6
3	22	(Switzerland) Jo Siffert	Brabham-BRM	109	+1 lap	12	4
4	4	(United States) Richie Ginther	BRM	107	+3 laps	13	3
5	17	(United States) Walt Hansgen	Lotus-Climax	107	+3 laps	17	2
6	12	(United Kingdom) Trevor Taylor	BRP-BRM	106	+4 laps	15	1
7	2	(United Kingdom) Mike Spence (United Kingdom) Jim Clark	Lotus-Climax	102	Out of fuel/fuel pump	6	
8	14	(United Kingdom) Mike Hailwood	Lotus-BRM	101	Oil pipe	16	
Ret	6	(United States) Dan Gurney	Brabham-Climax	69	Oil pressure	3	
NC	23	(United States) Hap Sharp	Brabham-BRM	65	+45 laps	18	
Ret	8	(Italy) Lorenzo Bandini	Ferrari	58	Engine	8	
Ret	1	(United Kingdom) Jim Clark (United Kingdom) Mike Spence	Lotus-Climax	54	Fuel injection	1	
Ret	25	(United States) Ronnie Bucknum	Honda	50	Engine/cylinder head gasket	14	
Ret	15	(New Zealand) Chris Amon	Lotus-BRM	47	Starter	11	
Ret	16	(Sweden) Jo Bonnier	Brabham-Climax	37	Rear axle	9	
Ret	9	(New Zealand) Bruce McLaren	Cooper-Climax	27	Engine/valve	5	
Ret	5	(Australia) Jack Brabham	Brabham-Climax	14	Engine	7	
Ret	10	(United States) Phil Hill	Cooper-Climax	4	Ignition	19	
Ret	11	(United Kingdom) Innes Ireland	BRP-BRM	2	Gearbox	10	

== Notes ==
- This was the 100th Formula One World Championship Grand Prix wherein an Italian driver participated. In those 100 races, Italian drivers had won 23 Grands Prix, had 75 podium finishes, 20 pole positions, 20 fastest laps and had won 3 World Championships.
- Graham Hill now held the sole record of two United States Grand Prix wins, breaking the record of one win set by Bruce McLaren at the 1959 United States Grand Prix.

== Championship standings after the race ==
Drivers' Championship standings

	Pos	Driver	Points
	1	(United Kingdom) Graham Hill	39 (41)
1	2	(United Kingdom) John Surtees	34
1	3	(United Kingdom) Jim Clark	30
	4	(United States) Richie Ginther	23
	5	(Italy) Lorenzo Bandini	19

Constructors' Championship standings

Pos	Constructor	Points
1	(Italy) Ferrari	43
2	(United Kingdom) BRM	42 (51)
3	(United Kingdom) Lotus-Climax	36 (37)
4	(United Kingdom) Brabham-Climax	21
5	(United Kingdom) Cooper-Climax	16

- Notes: Only the top five positions are included for both sets of standings. Only best 6 results counted toward the championship. Numbers without parentheses are championship points, numbers in parentheses are total points scored.

Previous race: 1964 Italian Grand Prix	FIA Formula One World Championship; 1964 season	Next race: 1964 Mexican Grand Prix
Previous race: 1963 United States Grand Prix	United States Grand Prix	Next race: 1965 United States Grand Prix
