= 1964 Austrian Grand Prix =

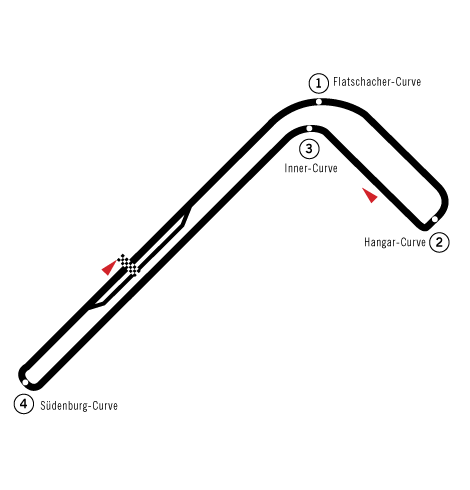

Race details
- Date: 23 August 1964
- Official name: II Großer Preis von Österreich
- Location: Zeltweg Airfield; Zeltweg, Austria
- Course: Temporary airport facility
- Course length: 3.186 km (1.980 mi)
- Distance: 105 laps, 336.0 km (208.781 mi)
- Weather: Dry

Pole position
Driver	(United Kingdom) Graham Hill	BRM
- Time: 1:09.84

Fastest lap
Driver	(United States) Dan Gurney	Brabham-Climax
- Time: 1:10.56 on lap 32

Podium
First	(Italy) Lorenzo Bandini	Ferrari
Second	(United States) Richie Ginther	BRM
Third	(United Kingdom) Bob Anderson	Brabham-Climax

The 1964 Austrian Grand Prix was a Formula One World Championship motor race held at Zeltweg Airfield on 23 August 1964. It was race 7 of 10 in both the 1964 World Championship of Drivers and the 1964 International Cup for Formula One Manufacturers. The 105-lap race was won by Ferrari driver Lorenzo Bandini after he started from seventh position. Richie Ginther finished second for the BRM team and Brabham driver Bob Anderson came in third. This was the debut World Championship race of the future world champion Jochen Rindt.

== Classification ==
=== Qualifying ===
Pos	No	Driver	Constructor	Time	Gap
1	3	(United Kingdom) Graham Hill	BRM	1:09.84	—
2	7	(United Kingdom) John Surtees	Ferrari	1:10.12	+0.28
3	1	(United Kingdom) Jim Clark	Lotus-Climax	1:10.21	+0.37
4	5	(United States) Dan Gurney	Brabham-Climax	1:10.40	+0.56
5	4	(United States) Richie Ginther	BRM	1:10.40	+0.56
6	6	(Australia) Jack Brabham	Brabham-Climax	1:10.57	+0.73
7	8	(Italy) Lorenzo Bandini	Ferrari	1:10.63	+0.79
8	2	(United Kingdom) Mike Spence	Lotus-Climax	1:11.00	+1.16
9	9	(New Zealand) Bruce McLaren	Cooper-Climax	1:11.25	+1.41
10	11	(Sweden) Jo Bonnier	Brabham-Climax	1:11.59	+1.75
11	14	(United Kingdom) Innes Ireland	BRP-BRM	1:11.60	+1.76
12	20	(Switzerland) Jo Siffert	Brabham-BRM	1:11.82	+1.98
13	12	(Austria) Jochen Rindt	Brabham-BRM	1:12.00	+2.16
14	22	(United Kingdom) Bob Anderson	Brabham-Climax	1:12.04	+2.20
15	18	(Italy) Giancarlo Baghetti	BRM	1:12.10	+2.26
16	15	(United Kingdom) Trevor Taylor	BRP-BRM	1:12.23	+2.39
17	16	(New Zealand) Chris Amon	Lotus-Climax	1:12.28	+2.44
18	17	(United Kingdom) Mike Hailwood	Lotus-BRM	1:12.40	+2.56
19	19	(South Africa) Tony Maggs	BRM	1:12.40	+2.56
20	10	(United States) Phil Hill	Cooper-Climax	1:13.15	+3.31

=== Race ===
Pos	No	Driver	Constructor	Laps	Time/Retired	Grid	Points
1	8	(Italy) Lorenzo Bandini	Ferrari	105	2:06:18.23	7	9
2	4	(United States) Richie Ginther	BRM	105	+6.18	5	6
3	22	(United Kingdom) Bob Anderson	Brabham-Climax	102	+3 laps	14	4
4	19	(South Africa) Tony Maggs	BRM	102	+3 laps	19	3
5	14	(United Kingdom) Innes Ireland	BRP-BRM	102	+3 laps	11	2
6	11	(Sweden) Jo Bonnier	Brabham-Climax	101	+4 laps	10	1
7	18	(Italy) Giancarlo Baghetti	BRM	96	+9 laps	15	
8	17	(United Kingdom) Mike Hailwood	Lotus-BRM	95	+10 laps	18	
9	6	(Australia) Jack Brabham	Brabham-Climax	76	+29 laps	6	
Ret	12	(Austria) Jochen Rindt	Brabham-BRM	58	Steering	13	
Ret	10	(United States) Phil Hill	Cooper-Climax	58	Accident/fire	20	
Ret	5	(United States) Dan Gurney	Brabham-Climax	47	Suspension	4	
Ret	9	(New Zealand) Bruce McLaren	Cooper-Climax	43	Engine/valve	9	
Ret	2	(United Kingdom) Mike Spence	Lotus-Climax	41	Halfshaft/transmission	8	
Ret	1	(United Kingdom) Jim Clark	Lotus-Climax	40	Halfshaft/transmission	3	
Ret	15	(United Kingdom) Trevor Taylor	BRP-BRM	21	Suspension	16	
Ret	20	(Switzerland) Jo Siffert	Brabham-BRM	18	Accident	12	
Ret	7	(United Kingdom) John Surtees	Ferrari	9	Suspension	2	
Ret	16	(New Zealand) Chris Amon	Lotus-Climax	7	Engine	17	
Ret	3	(United Kingdom) Graham Hill	BRM	5	Distributor	1	

== Notes ==
- This was the Formula One World Championship debut race for Austrian driver and future World Champion Jochen Rindt. Rindt was also the first Austrian to participate in Formula One.

== Championship standings after the race ==
Drivers' Championship standings

	Pos	Driver	Points
	1	(United Kingdom) Graham Hill	32
	2	(United Kingdom) Jim Clark	30
	3	(United Kingdom) John Surtees	19
	4	(United States) Richie Ginther	17
4	5	(Italy) Lorenzo Bandini	15

Constructors' Championship standings

	Pos	Constructor	Points
1	1	(United Kingdom) BRM	36 (39)
1	2	(United Kingdom) Lotus-Climax	34
	3	(Italy) Ferrari	28
	4	(United Kingdom) Brabham-Climax	21
	5	(United Kingdom) Cooper-Climax	10

- Notes: Only the top five positions are included for both sets of standings. Only best 6 results counted toward the championship. Numbers without parentheses are championship points, numbers in parentheses are total points scored.

Previous race: 1964 German Grand Prix	FIA Formula One World Championship; 1964 season	Next race: 1964 Italian Grand Prix
Previous race: 1963 Austrian Grand Prix	Austrian Grand Prix	Next race: 1970 Austrian Grand Prix
