= 1964 Mexican Grand Prix =

Race details
- Date: 25 October 1964
- Official name: III Gran Premio de México
- Location: Autódromo Hermanos Rodríguez, Magdalena Mixhuca, Mexico City
- Course: Permanent racing facility
- Course length: 5.000 km (3.107 miles)
- Distance: 65 laps, 325.000 km (201.946 miles)

Pole position
Driver	(United Kingdom) Jim Clark	Lotus-Climax
- Time: 1:57.24

Fastest lap
Driver	(United Kingdom) Jim Clark	Lotus-Climax
- Time: 1:58.37

Podium
First	(United States) Dan Gurney	Brabham-Climax
Second	(United Kingdom) John Surtees	Ferrari
Third	(Italy) Lorenzo Bandini	Ferrari

The 1964 Mexican Grand Prix was a Formula One motor race held at the Ciudad Deportiva Magdalena Mixhuca in Mexico City on 25 October 1964. It was race 10 of 10 in both the 1964 World Championship of Drivers and the 1964 International Cup for Formula One Manufacturers.

It was perhaps the most dramatic finale in the history of the World Championship. Championship points could only be scored by the first six finishers (9–6–4–3–2–1 points). Arriving to the race, three drivers had a chance of winning the title: Graham Hill (BRM P261) with 39 points, John Surtees (Ferrari) with 34, and Jim Clark (Lotus 33-Climax) with 30. In order to win the title, Clark had to win the race, with Surtees finishing not higher than third and Hill not higher than fourth. (Note: Hill had already scored points in six races and only the best six scores counted; he would have to drop the points for his weakest four finishes. If he finished fourth or higher he would have to drop three points scored for the Dutch Grand Prix. Neither Clark nor Surtees had scored in six races thus far.) Surtees could only win the title by finishing first, in each case, or second, unless Hill finished as high as third.

The race began with Clark leading from pole position with Dan Gurney running second in the Brabham-Climax (Gurney had only ten points going into this race having won the French Grand Prix and scored a sixth place at the Belgian Grand Prix). Hill and Lorenzo Bandini, Surtees's teammate, were duelling for third place, with Surtees a distant fifth, seemingly with no chance at winning the title. Then Bandini ran into the back of Hill's BRM, causing him to spin into the Armco, damaging his exhaust and lose a few places. Thereafter Hill's car ran with a crimped exhaust pipe, causing him to lose power. The championship was now firmly in Clark's grasp. If the positions remained the same, he would be champion with four victories to Hill's two, although they would be tied on points at 39. On the penultimate lap, an oil line failed and Clark's engine seized as the Lotus crossed the line, with one lap left to go. The positions were now Gurney–Bandini–Surtees, meaning the championship would be Hill's, so long as Surtees placed no higher. Realizing Surtees could win the title by finishing second, the Ferrari team manager frantically signalled Bandini to slow down as he passed the pits to enter the last lap and let Surtees through. Bandini dutifully did so and Surtees finished second, thus winning the World Championship of Drivers by one point over Hill (40 to 39). Meanwhile, Gurney won the Grand Prix, almost unnoticed. The Ferrari cars were entered by the American NART team and painted white with blue lengthwise "Cunningham racing stripes", the national colours of the teams licensed in the United States. Since Ferrari cars entered in the 1965 and 1969 seasons by the American NART team and at the 1966 Italian Grand Prix by the British privateer Reg Parnell team kept wearing the red colour, this race was the last time Ferrari cars wore other than the traditional red colour (rosso corsa) in Formula One.

== Championship permutations ==
For the first – and thus far – only time in Formula One history, three British drivers went into the last race with a chance of winning the championship. 1962 World Champion Hill, who had the chance of winning his second world championship in three years, was going into the final round of the season with a five-point-lead over Surtees, with Clark a further four points behind in third. Hill was in the strongest position amongst the three contenders as he only needed a second place to win the title. Surtees had the opportunity to become both Formula One World Champion for the very first time and the third different British World Drivers' Champion consecutively, whilst Clark would have been able to successfully defend his title, becoming the first driver since Jack Brabham in 1960 to do so.

The championship would have been won by either of the top three drivers in the following manner:

	Hill would have won if:		
	(United Kingdom) Graham Hill	(United Kingdom) John Surtees	(United Kingdom) Jim Clark
Pos.	2nd or better	Any position	Any position
Pos.	3rd	2nd or lower	Any position
Pos.	lower than 3rd	3rd or lower	2nd or lower

	Surtees would have won if:		
	(United Kingdom) John Surtees	(United Kingdom) Graham Hill	(United Kingdom) Jim Clark
Pos.	1st	Any position	Any position
Pos.	2nd	4th or lower	Any position

	Clark would have won if:		
	(United Kingdom) Jim Clark	(United Kingdom) Graham Hill	(United Kingdom) John Surtees
Pos.	1st	4th or lower	3rd or lower

In another first, three constructors were fighting for the championship:

- Ferrari (43pts) needed either:
  - 1st
  - 2nd, with the top BRM 3rd or lower
  - Any result, with the top Lotus-Climax 2nd or lower and the top BRM in 3rd or lower
- BRM (42pts) needed:
  - 1st
- Lotus-Climax (37pts) needed:
  - 1st, with the top Ferrari 3rd or lower

== Classification ==
=== Qualifying ===
Pos	No	Driver	Constructor	Time	Gap
1	1	(United Kingdom) Jim Clark	Lotus-Climax	1:57.24	—
2	6	(United States) Dan Gurney	Brabham-Climax	1:58.10	+0.86
3	8	(Italy) Lorenzo Bandini	Ferrari	1:58.60	+1.36
4	7	(United Kingdom) John Surtees	Ferrari	1:58.70	+1.46
5	2	(United Kingdom) Mike Spence	Lotus-Climax	1:59.21	+1.97
6	3	(United Kingdom) Graham Hill	BRM	1:59.80	+2.56
7	5	(Australia) Jack Brabham	Brabham-Climax	1:59.99	+2.75
8	16	(Sweden) Jo Bonnier	Brabham-Climax	2:00.17	+2.93
9	18	(Mexico) Pedro Rodríguez	Ferrari	2:00.90	+3.66
10	9	(New Zealand) Bruce McLaren	Cooper-Climax	2:01.12	+3.88
11	4	(United States) Richie Ginther	BRM	2:01.15	+3.91
12	15	(New Zealand) Chris Amon	Lotus-BRM	2:01.17	+3.93
13	22	(Switzerland) Jo Siffert	Brabham-BRM	2:01.37	+4.13
14	17	(Mexico) Moisés Solana	Lotus-Climax	2:01.43	+4.19
15	10	(United States) Phil Hill	Cooper-Climax	2:02.00	+4.76
16	11	(United Kingdom) Innes Ireland	BRP-BRM	2:02.35	+5.11
17	14	(United Kingdom) Mike Hailwood	Lotus-BRM	2:04.11	+6.87
18	12	(United Kingdom) Trevor Taylor	BRP-BRM	2:04.90	+7.66
19	23	(United States) Hap Sharp	Brabham-BRM	2:06.90	+9.66

=== Race ===
Pos	No	Driver	Constructor	Laps	Time/Retired	Grid	Points
1	6	(United States) Dan Gurney	Brabham-Climax	65	2:09:50.32	2	9
2	7	(United Kingdom) John Surtees	Ferrari	65	+ 1:08.94	4	6
3	8	(Italy) Lorenzo Bandini	Ferrari	65	+ 1:09.63	3	4
4	2	(United Kingdom) Mike Spence	Lotus-Climax	65	+ 1:21.86	5	3
5	1	(United Kingdom) Jim Clark	Lotus-Climax	64	Engine/Oil line	1	2
6	18	(Mexico) Pedro Rodríguez	Ferrari	64	+ 1 lap	9	1
7	9	(New Zealand) Bruce McLaren	Cooper-Climax	64	+ 1 lap	10	
8	4	(United States) Richie Ginther	BRM	64	+ 1 lap	11	
9	10	(United States) Phil Hill	Cooper-Climax	63	Engine	15	
10	17	(Mexico) Moisés Solana	Lotus-Climax	63	+ 2 laps	14	
11	3	(United Kingdom) Graham Hill	BRM	63	+ 2 laps	6	
12	11	(United Kingdom) Innes Ireland	BRP-BRM	61	+ 4 laps	16	
13	23	(United States) Hap Sharp	Brabham-BRM	60	+ 5 laps	19	
Ret	15	(New Zealand) Chris Amon	Lotus-BRM	46	Gearbox	12	
Ret	5	(Australia) Jack Brabham	Brabham-Climax	44	Electrical	7	
Ret	14	(United Kingdom) Mike Hailwood	Lotus-BRM	12	Overheating	17	
Ret	22	(Switzerland) Jo Siffert	Brabham-BRM	11	Fuel pump	13	
Ret	16	(Sweden) Jo Bonnier	Brabham-Climax	9	Suspension	8	
Ret	12	(United Kingdom) Trevor Taylor	BRP-BRM	6	Overheating	18	

== Final Championship standings ==
- **Bold text** indicates the World Champions.

Drivers' Championship standings

	Pos	Driver	Points
1	1	(United Kingdom) **John Surtees**	40
1	2	(United Kingdom) Graham Hill	39 (41)
	3	(United Kingdom) Jim Clark	32
1	4	(Italy) Lorenzo Bandini	23
1	5	(United States) Richie Ginther	23

Constructors' Championship standings

Pos	Constructor	Points
1	(Italy) **Ferrari**	45 (49)
2	(United Kingdom) BRM	42 (51)
3	(United Kingdom) Lotus-Climax	37 (40)
4	(United Kingdom) Brabham-Climax	30
5	(United Kingdom) Cooper-Climax	16

- Notes: Only the top five positions are included for both sets of standings. Only best 6 results counted toward the championship. Numbers without parentheses are championship points, numbers in parentheses are total points scored.

== Notes ==
Previous race: 1964 United States Grand Prix	FIA Formula One World Championship; 1964 season	Next race: 1965 South African Grand Prix
Previous race: 1963 Mexican Grand Prix	Mexican Grand Prix	Next race: 1965 Mexican Grand Prix
