= Lidingö Cemetery =

Burial site in Stockholm County, Sweden

Coordinates: 59°21′57.96″N 18°9′31.28″E

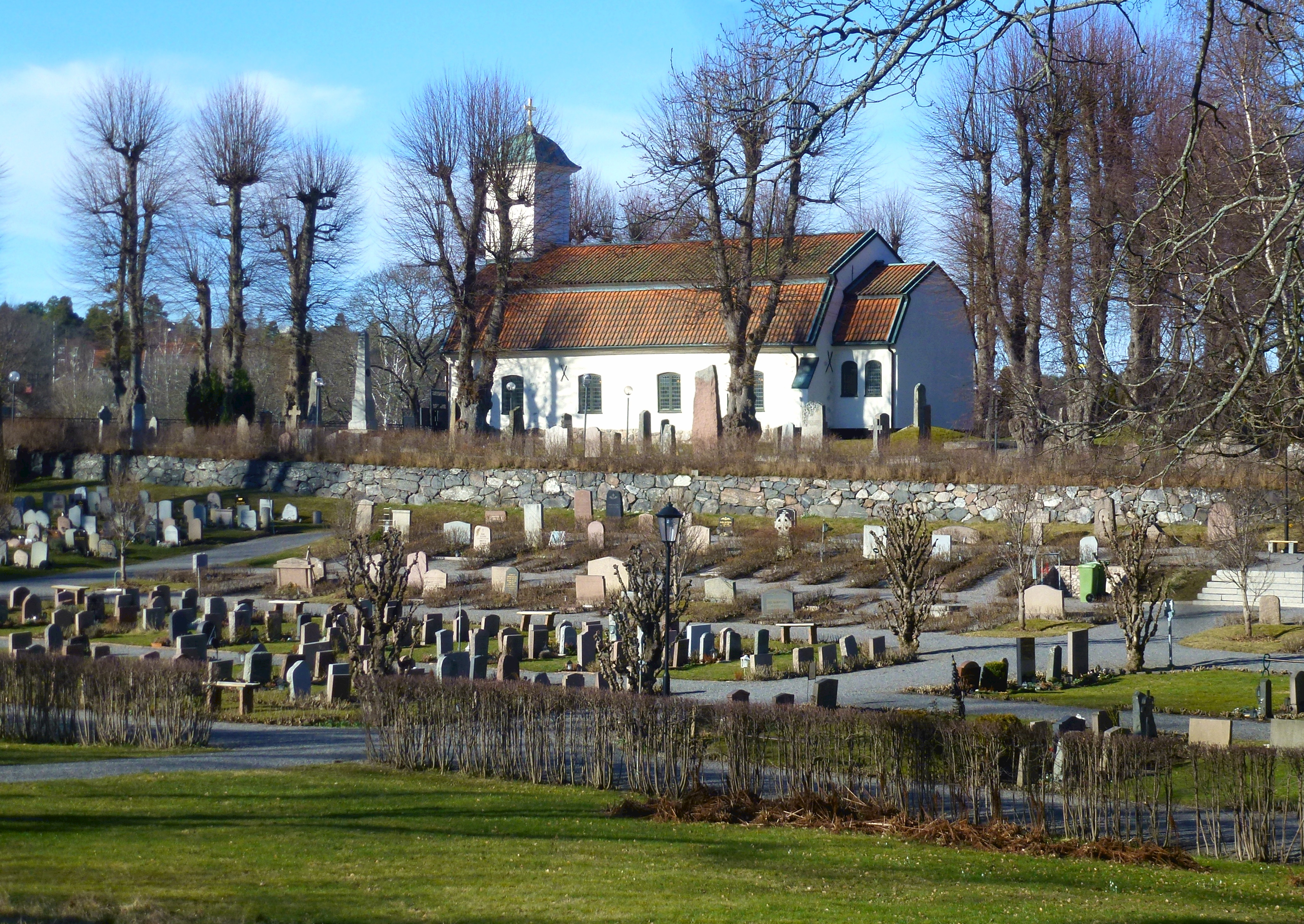
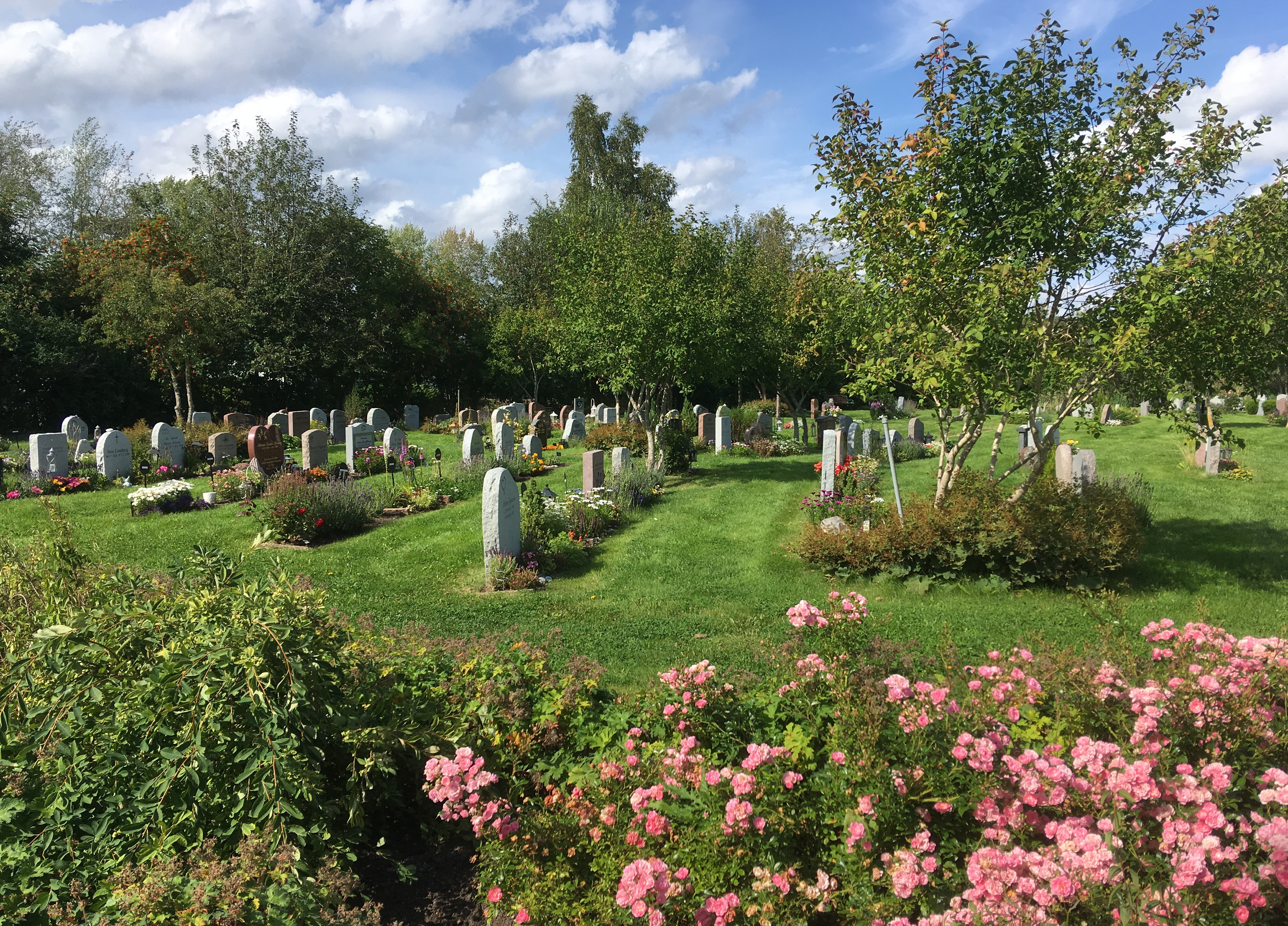
Lidingö Cemetery, the old part (to the left) and the new part

Lidingö Cemetery (Swedish: Lidingö kyrkogård) is a cemetery located adjacent to Lidingö Church in Stockholm County, Sweden. It is centrally located on the island of Lidingö at an elevation adjacent to Kyrkviken's southern shore. South-west of the church is Hersbyholm and south on the other side of Ekholmsnäsvägen is one of Lidingö's well-known townhouse areas, Hersby Gärde.

== History ==
Lidingö Church appears for the first time on a map from 1661. Also marked on the map are some of the farms and dwellings that were on the island at that time. Around the church and the cemetery an arched wall was built in 1755, which is partly preserved. The wreath of lime trees around the oldest part of the cemetery was planted around 1810. The cemetery was expanded south and east in 1854 and was then supplemented with new rows of lime trees. The cemetery continued to expand in turns both south and east in 1905 and in 1909. Then the so-called Kyrkbacken was added. From 1945 to 1952, the areas called Bakom kolumbariet ("Behind the Columbarium"), De övre terrasserna ("The Upper Terraces") and Halvmånen ("The Crescent") were built. All are located south of the columbarium. In 1952, the newer parts of the cemetery and the columbarium were inaugurated. In 1964, the first stage of the Åsen area was built, designed by Inger Wedborn. In 1965 the Nedanför kranskullen area was designed by Inger Wedborn. Wedborn also drew up the basic proposals for the continued eastward expansion, which for some reason later changed. The areas east and north were inaugurated in turns during the 1970s and 1980s. The memorial grove in the middle of the cemetery was built in 1974 and was adorned with the statue Ängel ("Angel") by Carl Milles in 1999. The most recently added areas are the Vilokullen and the block north of Norra gångsvägen towards Kyrkviken. These were inaugurated during the 1990s and 2000s.

== Notable burials ==
- Hans Alfredson
- Gert Bonnier
- Joakim Bonnier
- Irja Browallius
- Gustaf Dalén
- Tage Danielsson
- Siri Derkert
- Thore Ehrling
- Jarl Hjalmarson
- Ernst-Hugo Järegård
- Anna Lang
- Ingrid Lang-Fagerström
- Pär Lagerkvist
- Bertil Malmberg
- Gerald Mohr
- Jan Olof Olsson
- Agneta Prytz
- Povel Ramel
- Birgitta Valberg
- Elsa Danson Wåghals
- Paul Petter Waldenström
- Stig Westerberg

== Gallery, gravestones ==
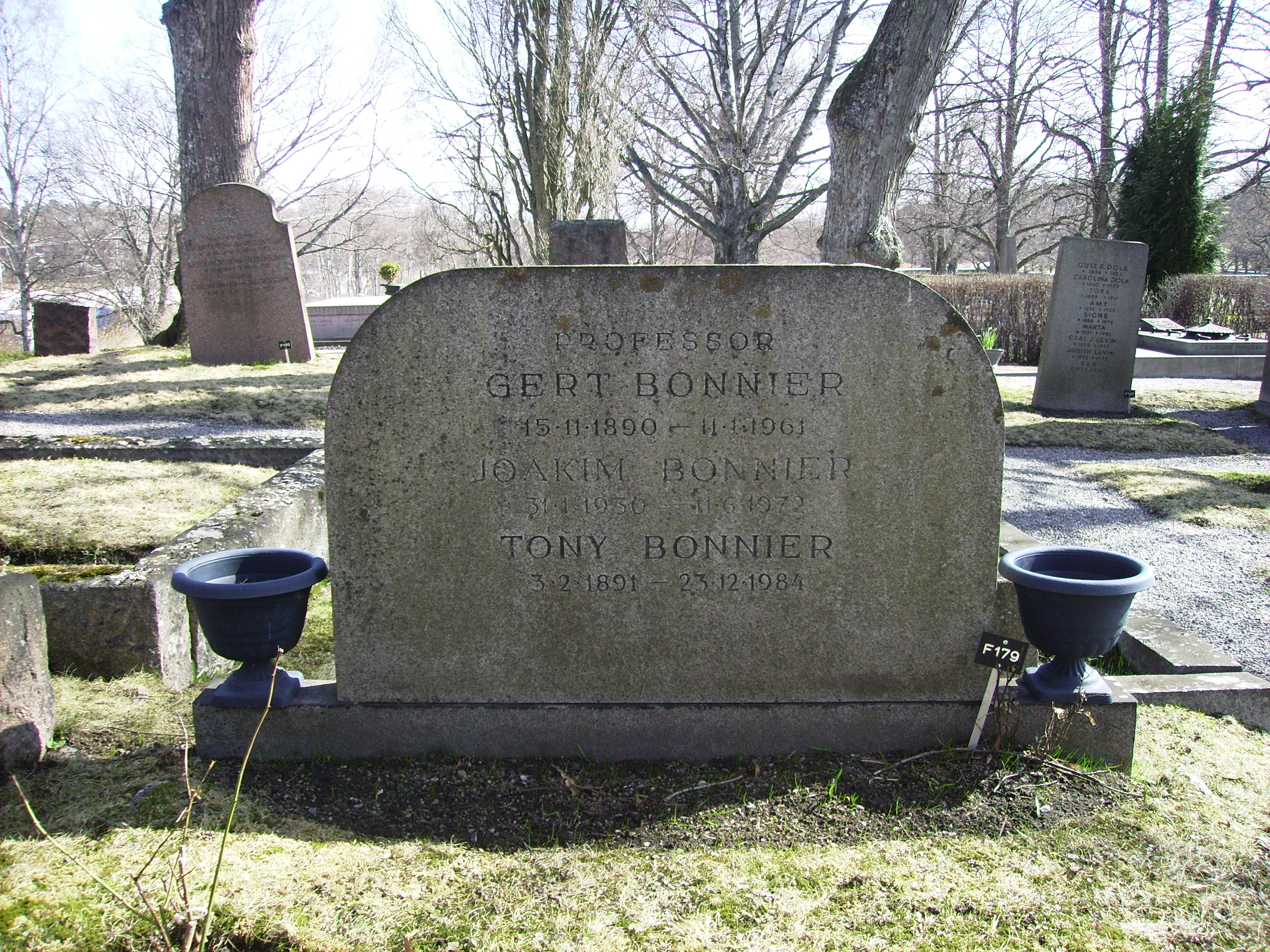
Gert Bonnier
Joakim Bonnier

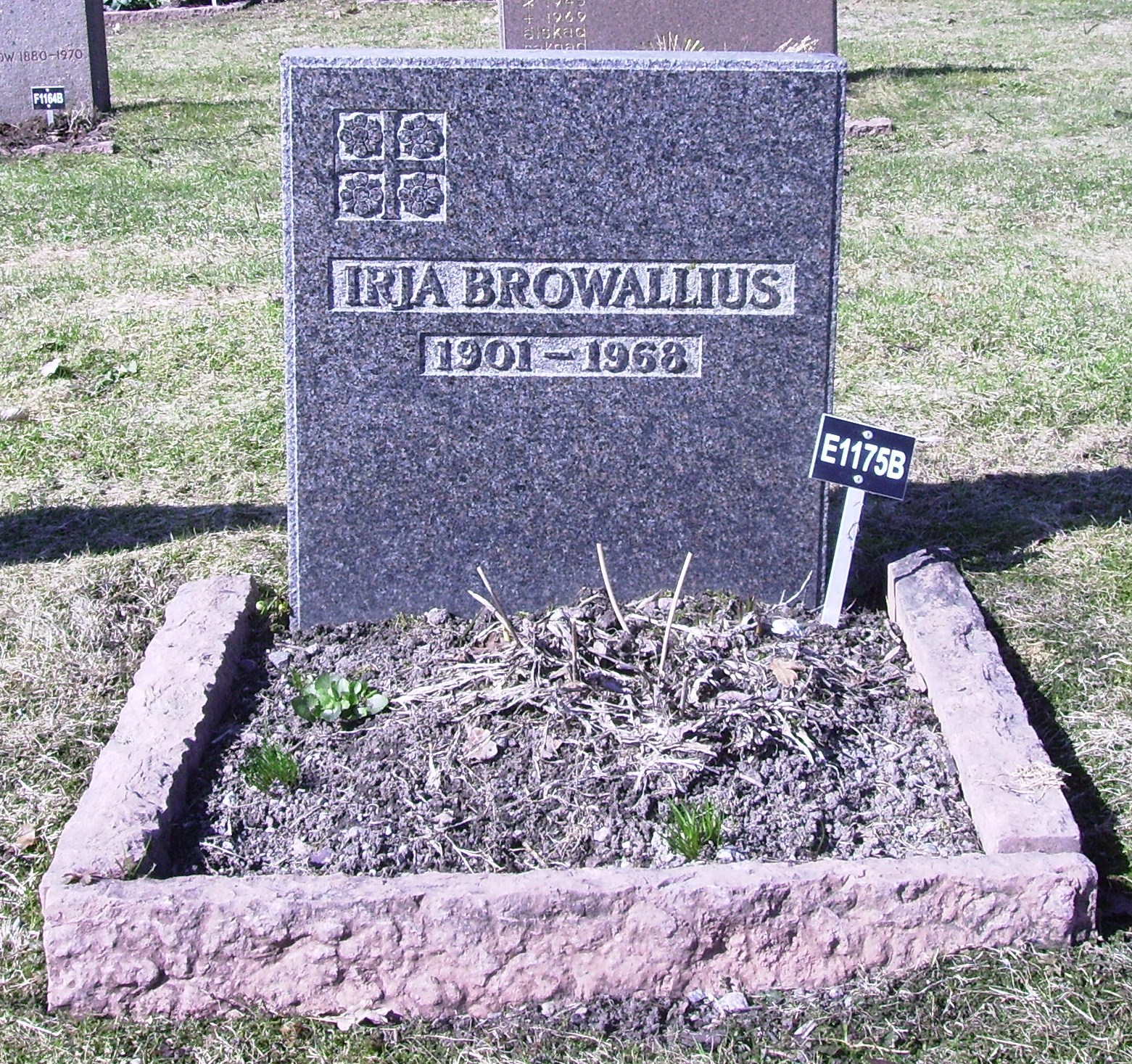
Irja Browallius

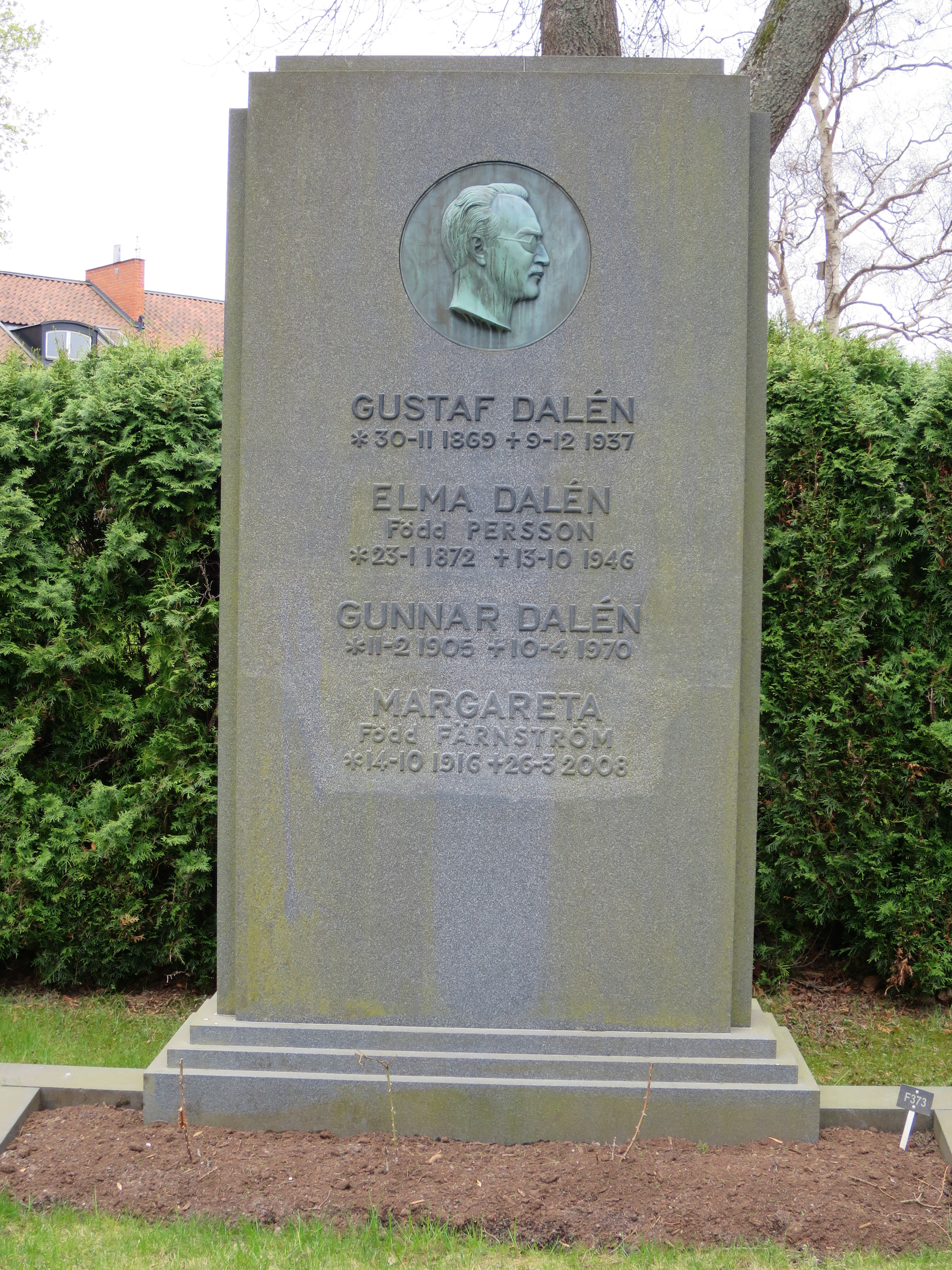
Gustaf Dalén

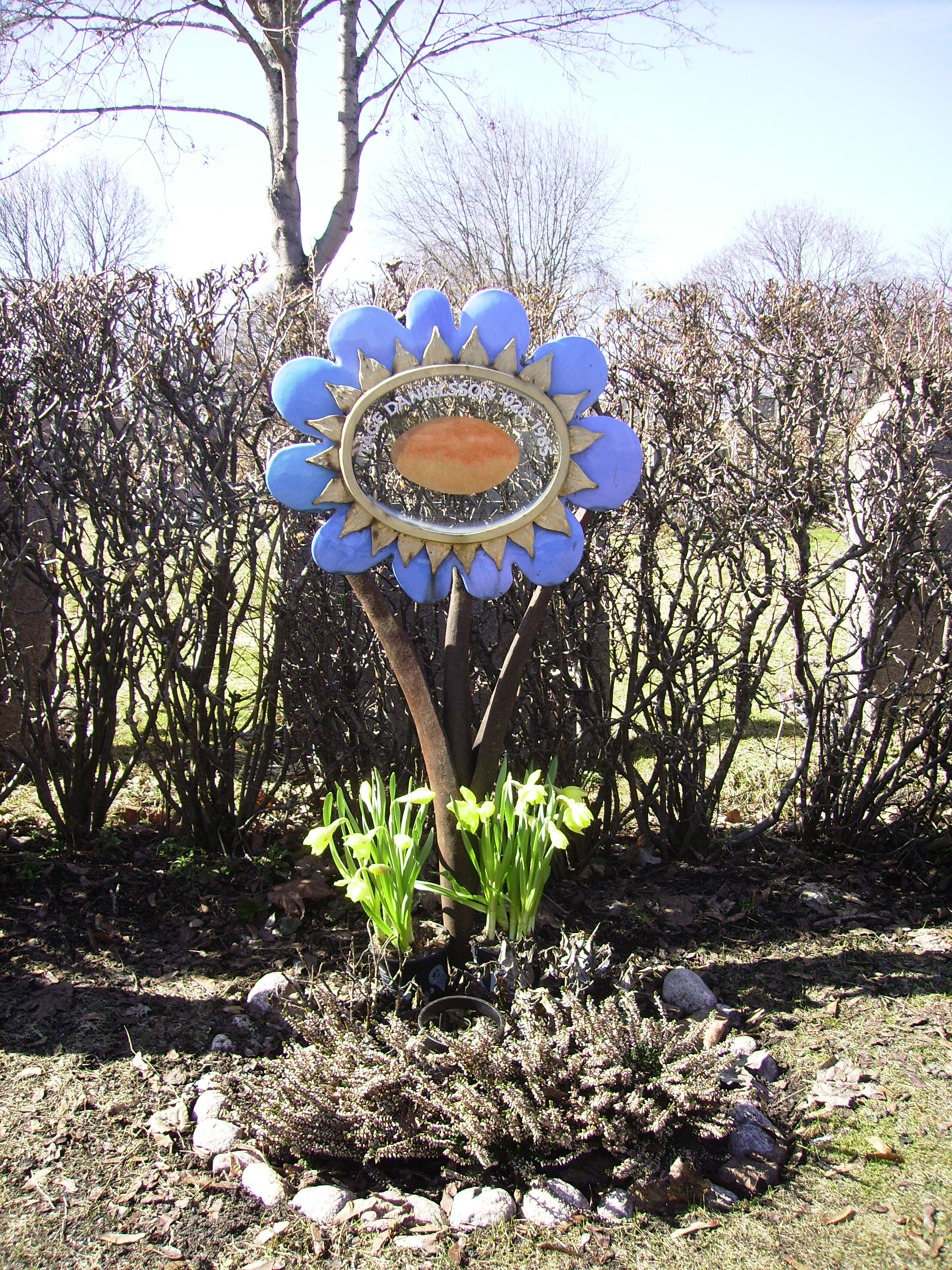
Tage Danielsson

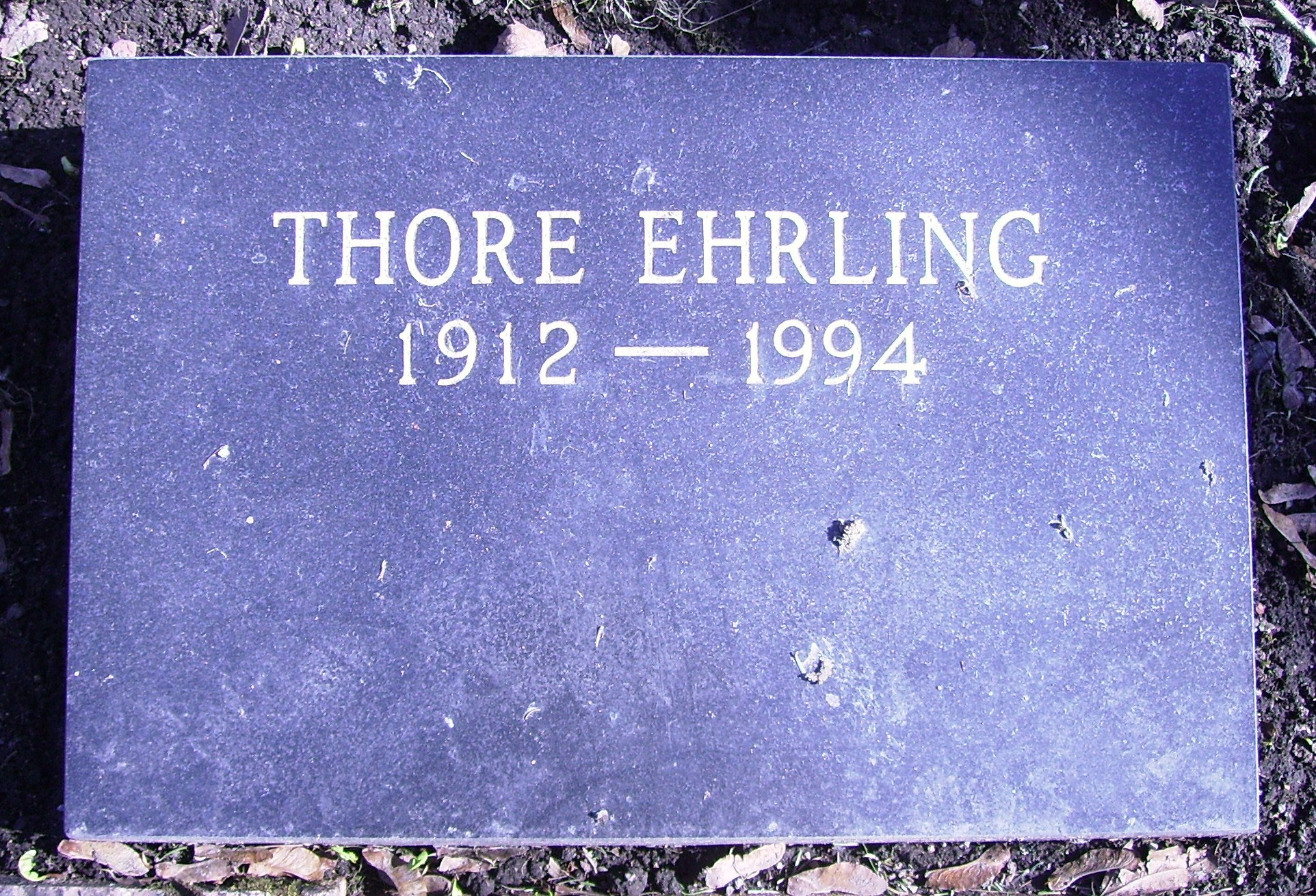
Thore Ehrling

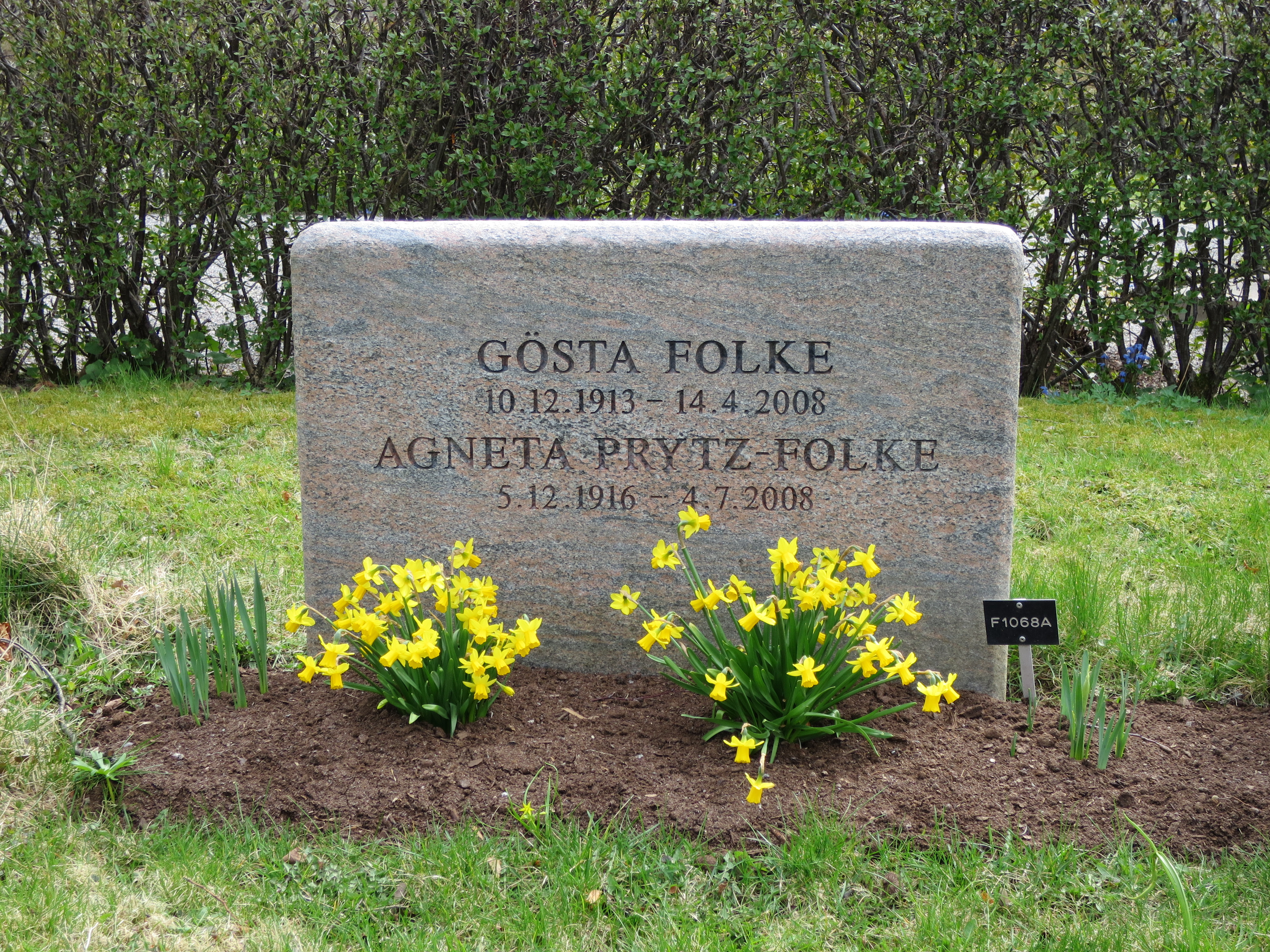
Gösta Folke
Agneta Prytz

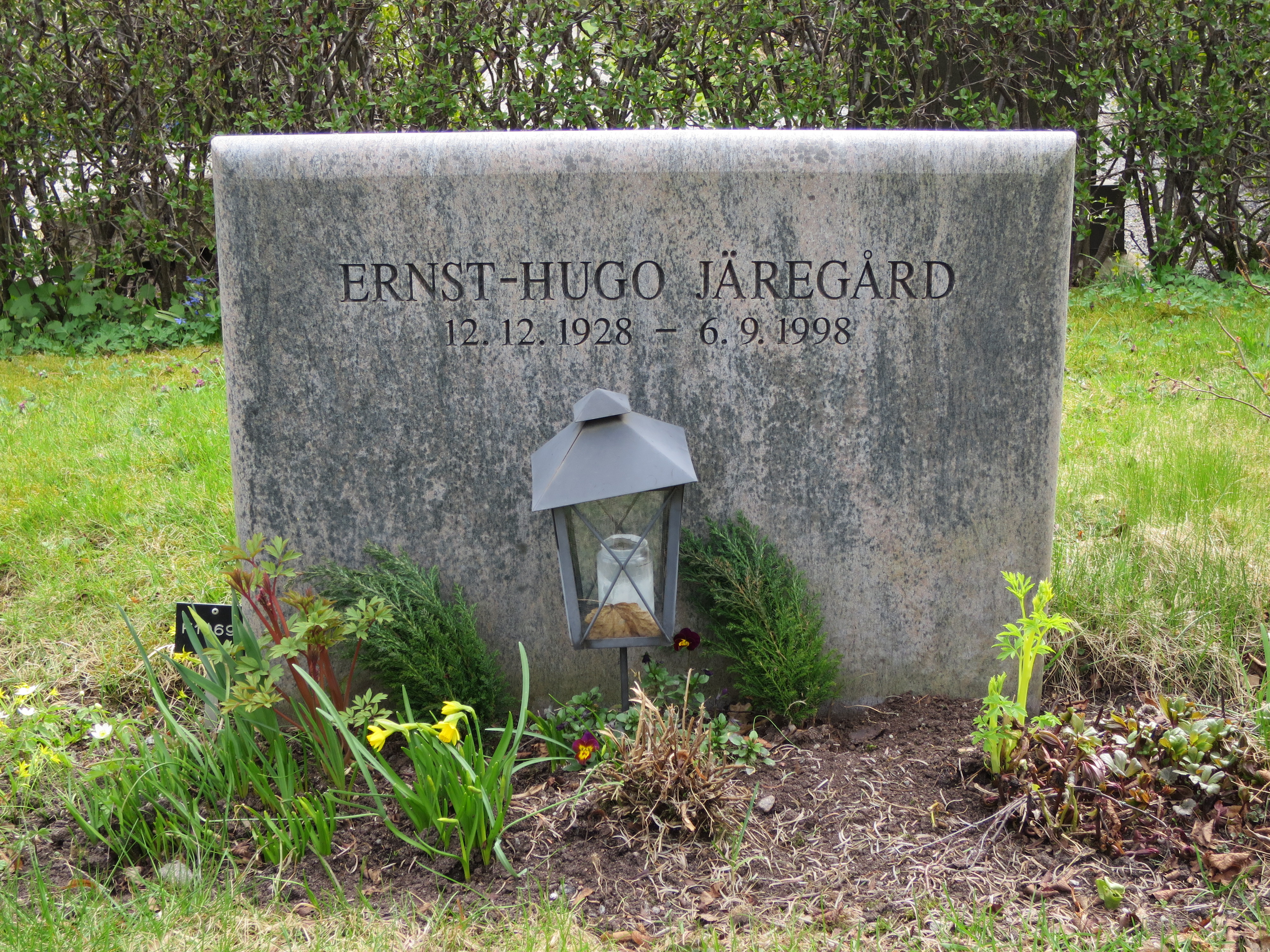
Ernst-Hugo Järegård

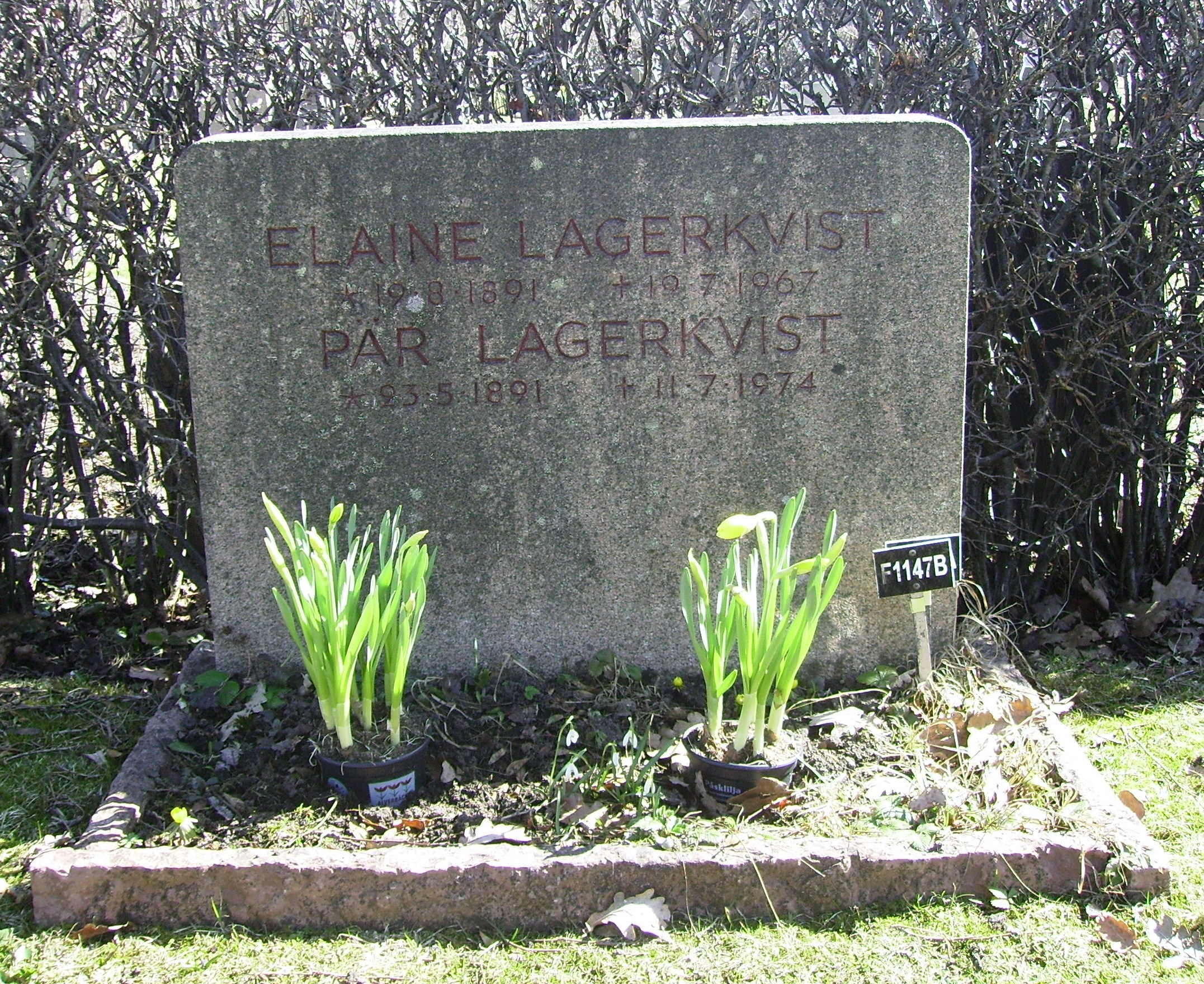
Pär Lagerkvist

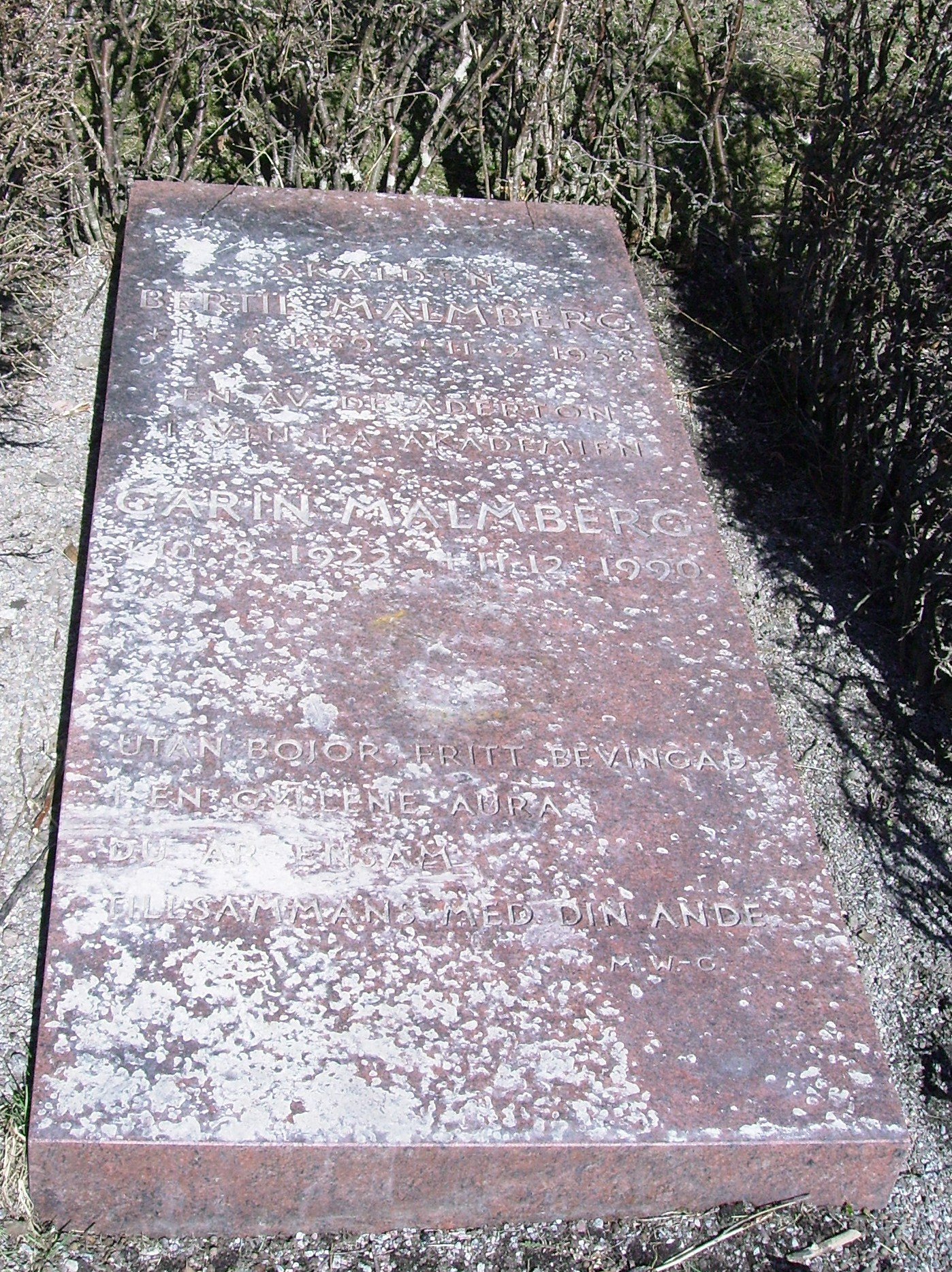
Bertil Malmberg

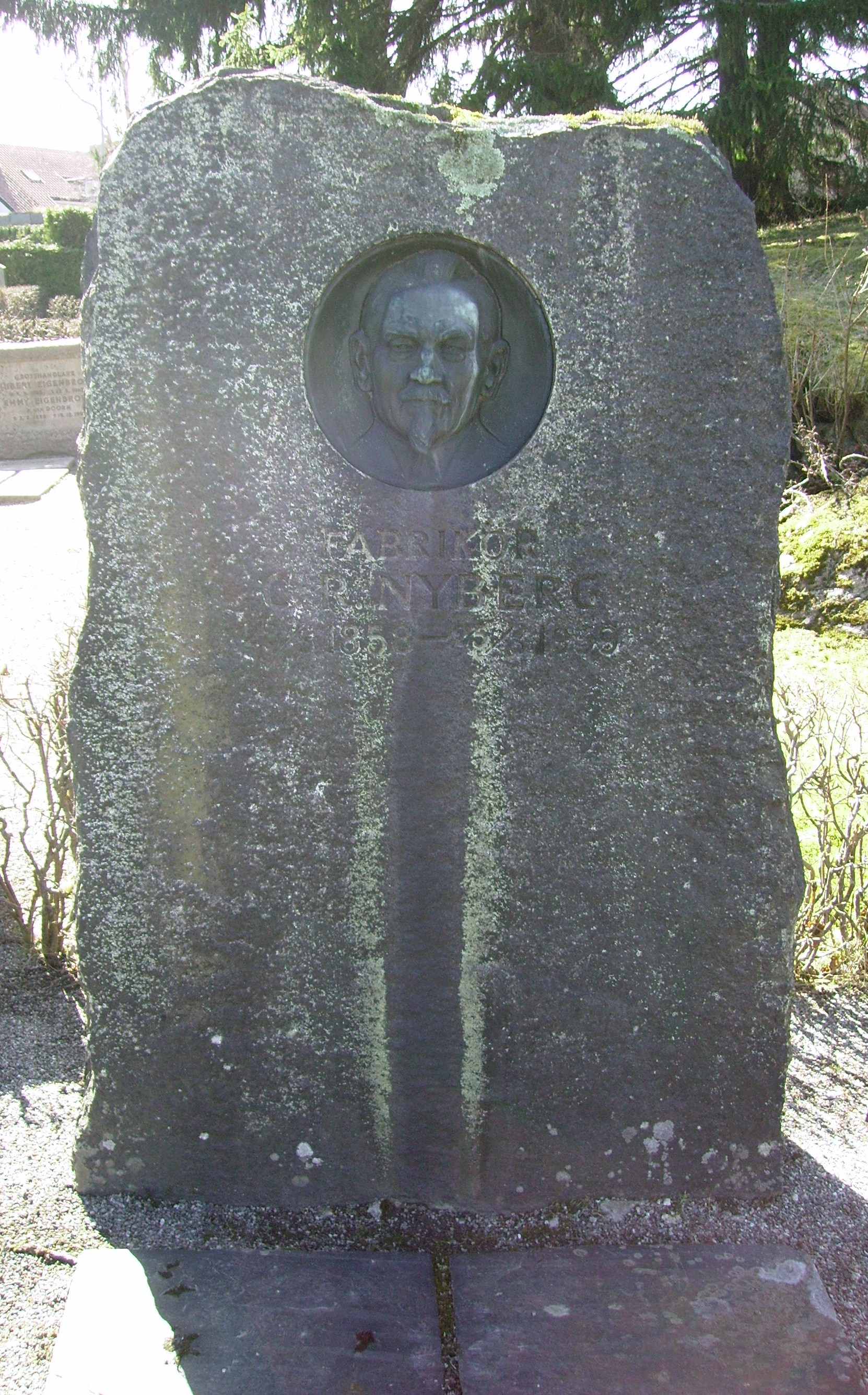
Carl Richard Nyberg

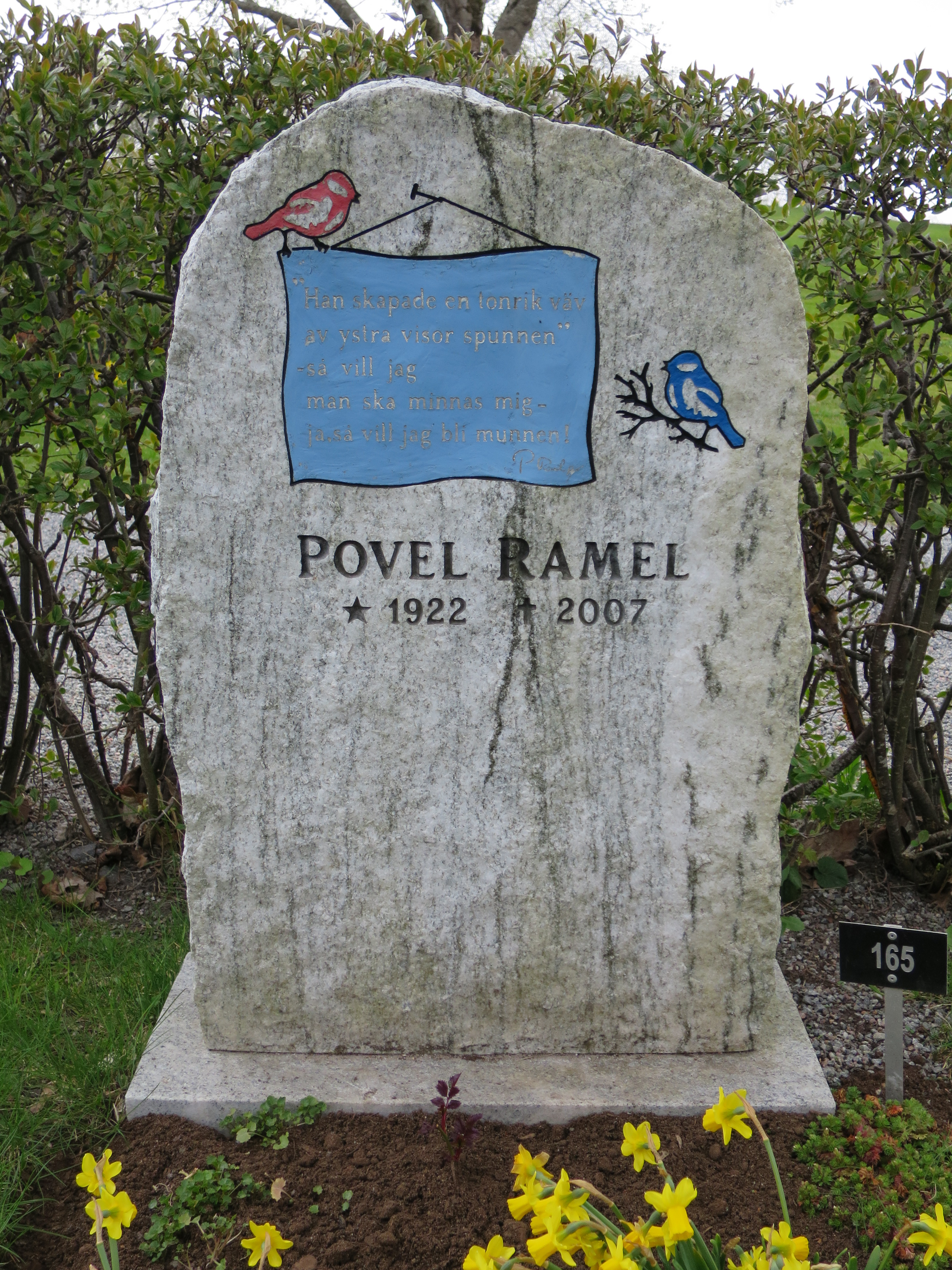
Povel Ramel

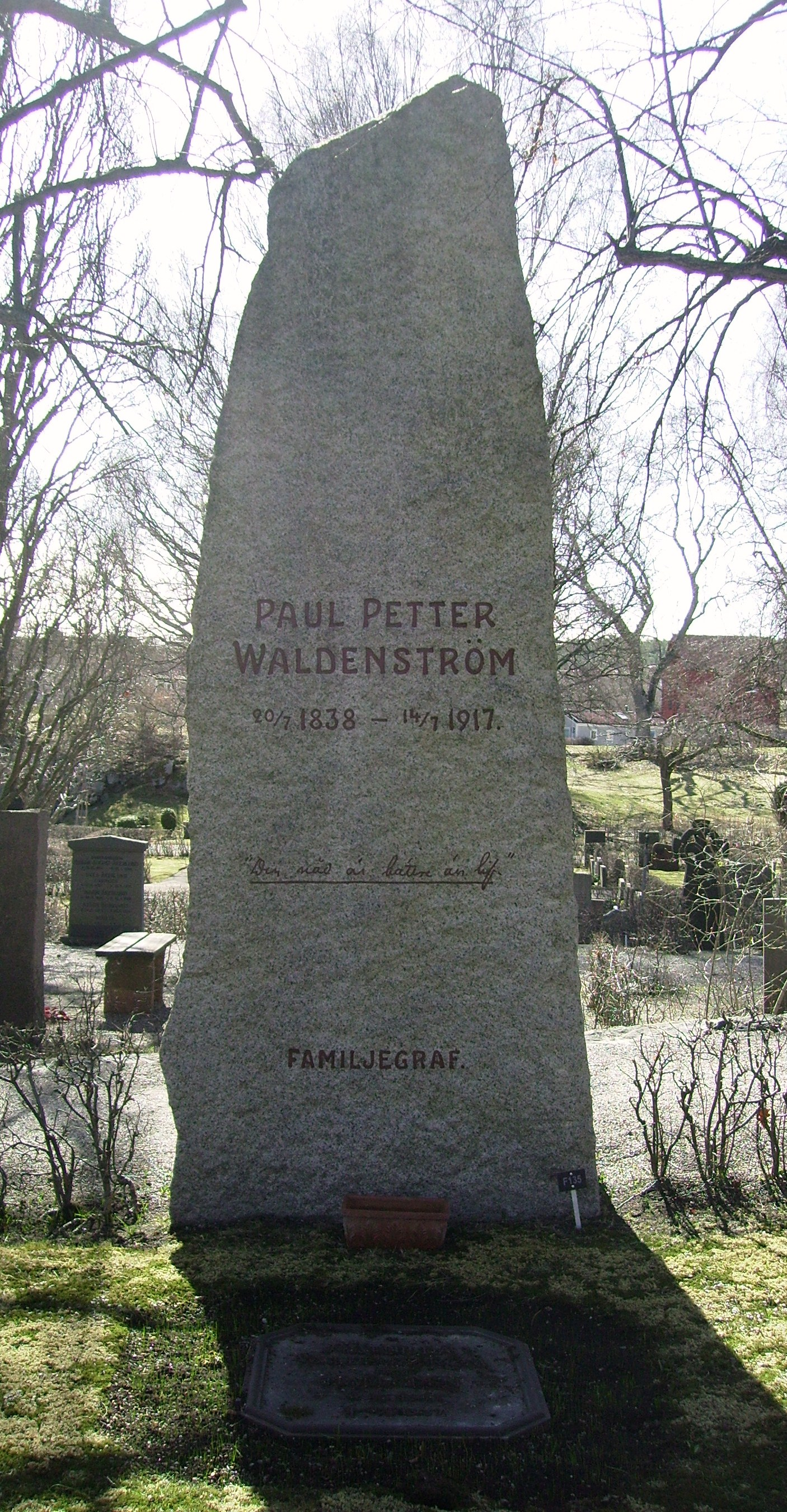
Paul Petter Waldenström

== See also ==
- Lidingö Municipality
