= Formula One drivers from Sweden =

- Drivers: 11
- Grands Prix: 441
- Entries: 510
- Starts: 469
- Best season finish: 2nd (1971, 1978)
- Wins: 12
- Podiums: 44
- Pole positions: 15
- Fastest laps: 10
- Points: 396
- First entry: 1951 German Grand Prix
- First win: 1959 Dutch Grand Prix
- Latest win: 1978 Austrian Grand Prix
- Latest entry: 2018 Abu Dhabi Grand Prix
- 2026 drivers: None

There have been 11 Formula One drivers from Sweden who have entered a Formula One Grand Prix of whom 10 have started a race.

== Former drivers ==
Erik Lundgren was the first Swedish driver to enter a Formula One race when he entered the 1951 German Grand Prix, but withdrew before the event.

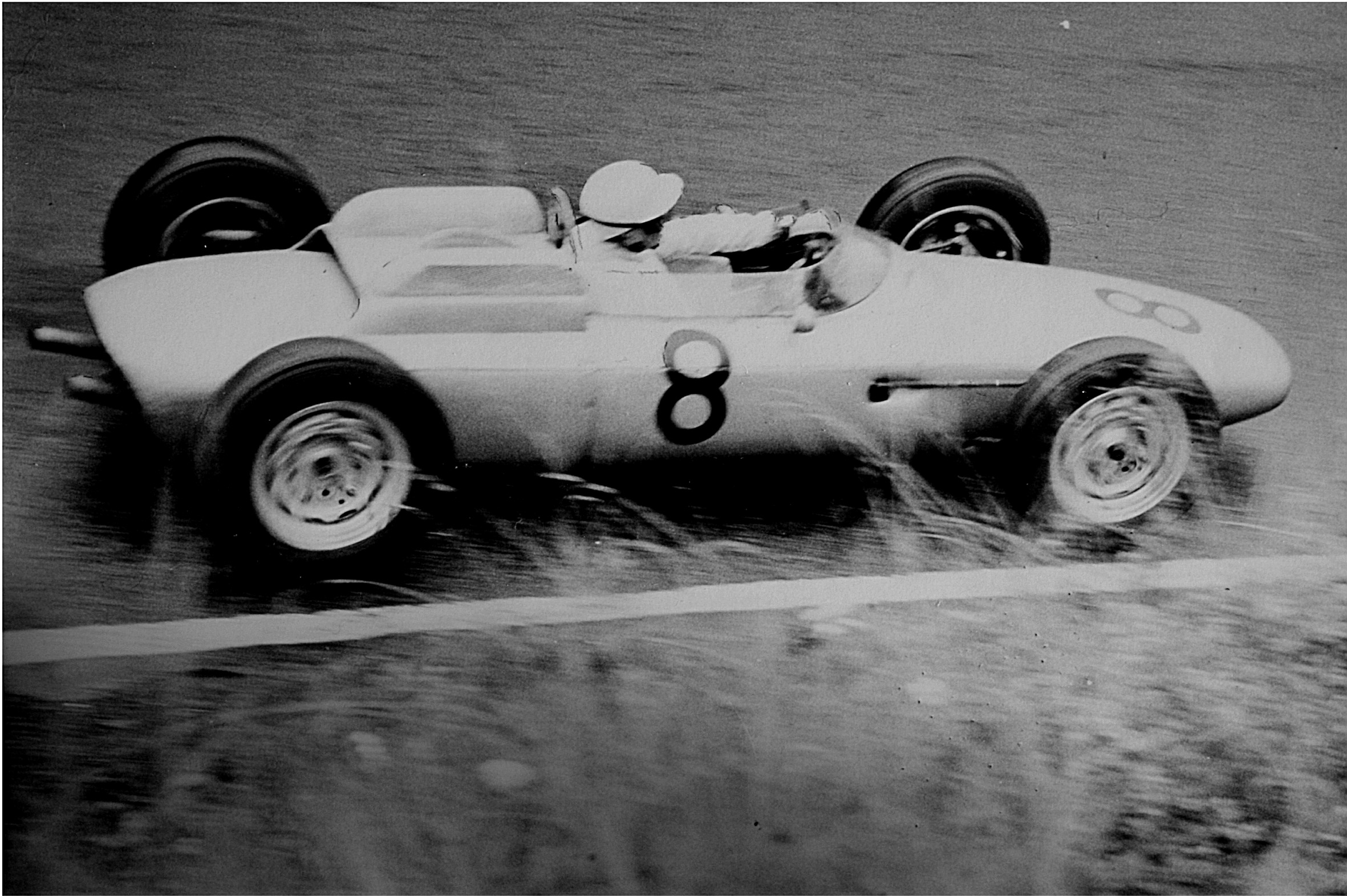
Bonnier driving for Porsche at the 1962 German Grand Prix.

Jo Bonnier was the first Swedish Formula One driver. He made his debut at the 1956 Italian Grand Prix in a Maserati, resulting in a retirement. He raced sporadically across the following 15 Formula One seasons, his greatest achievement being victory in the 1959 Dutch Grand Prix with BRM. He was killed in an accident in the 1972 24 Hours of Le Mans.

1967 Swedish F3 champion Reine Wisell made his debut with Lotus at the 1970 United States Grand Prix. He scored a podium finish in his debut race, but only four more points finishes followed in his career, all in the following year. The subsequent years saw a large drop in form and he eventually retired following his home race of 1974.

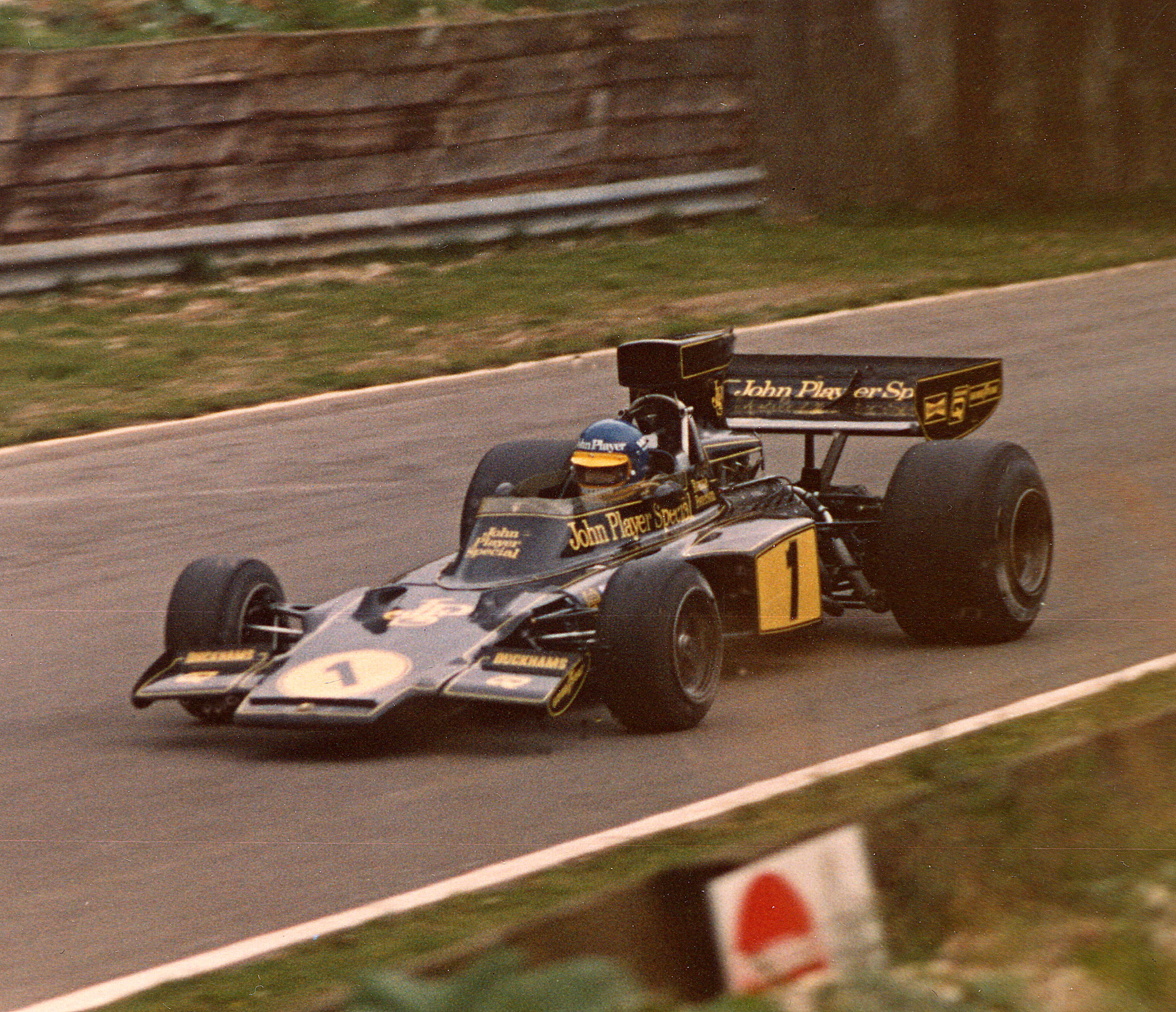
Peterson driving for Lotus at the 1974 British Grand Prix.

Sweden's most successful Formula One driver was Ronnie Peterson. In a career that spanned 9 seasons he won 10 Grands Prix and came close to winning the championship on multiple occasions. He was an in-demand driver who was signed by teams such as March, Tyrrell and Lotus. Peterson was killed as a result of medical complications following a fiery accident at the 1978 Italian Grand Prix. His last career victory at the 1978 Austrian Grand Prix is the most recent for a Swedish Formula One driver.

Bertil Roos competed in one race – the 1974 Swedish Grand Prix in a Shadow. He retired on lap two through transmission failure.

Torsten Palm entered two Grands Prix in the 1975 season in a privateer Hesketh. He failed to qualify in Monaco and finished 10th in Sweden despite running out of fuel.

Conny Andersson entered five Grands Prix. His only appearance in the 1976 season was with Surtees at the Dutch Grand Prix, retiring after 9 laps. He failed to qualify for any of the events he entered in 1977.

Gunnar Nilsson raced for 2 almost full seasons in Formula One, in 1976–77 – qualifying his Lotus for every Grand Prix he entered. His short career was very up-and-down, with 17 retirements along with 4 podiums, including a win in the 1977 Belgian Grand Prix. He retired from his last seven straight Grands Prix and was beginning to show the signs of the testicular cancer that he would eventually pass away from.

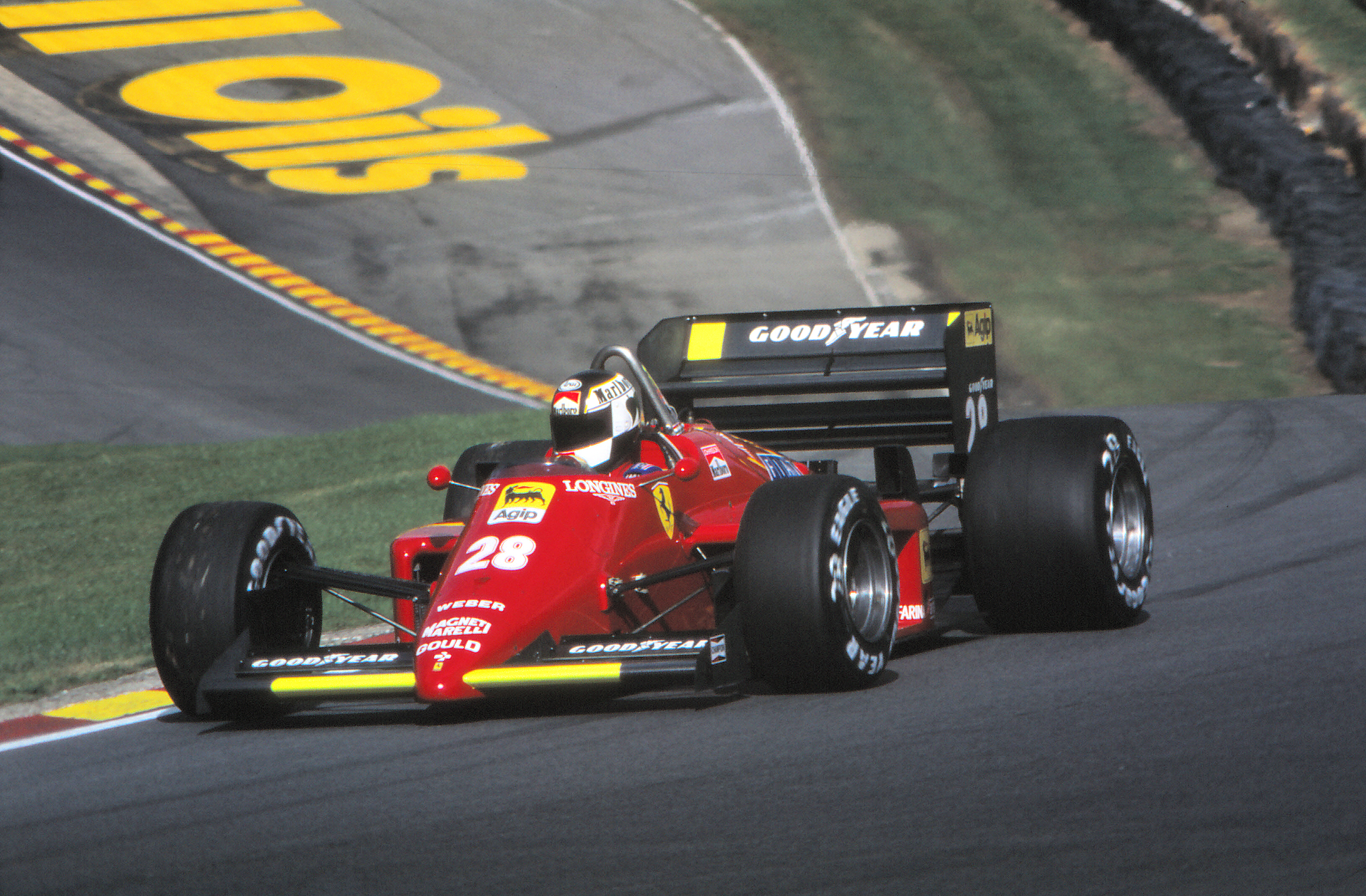
Johansson driving for Ferrari at the 1985 European Grand Prix

Stefan Johansson made an inauspicious start in Formula One, failing to qualify for his first two races in a Shadow at the 1980 Argentine and Brazilian Grands Prix. He didn't return until 1983, where he drove six of the last seven Grands Prix for Spirit. The next eight seasons were continually up-and-down; from two seasons at Ferrari and a season with McLaren to struggling to qualify for Onyx and Footwork at career's end. He scored 12 podiums (including a shock 3rd with Onyx in the 1989 Portuguese Grand Prix) but a win proved elusive.

In the two-year break Johansson took from Formula One, Slim Borgudd entered 15 Grands Prix with ATS and Tyrrell. He failed to qualify five times and scored his sole point at the 1981 British Grand Prix. He was dumped by Tyrrell after three races.

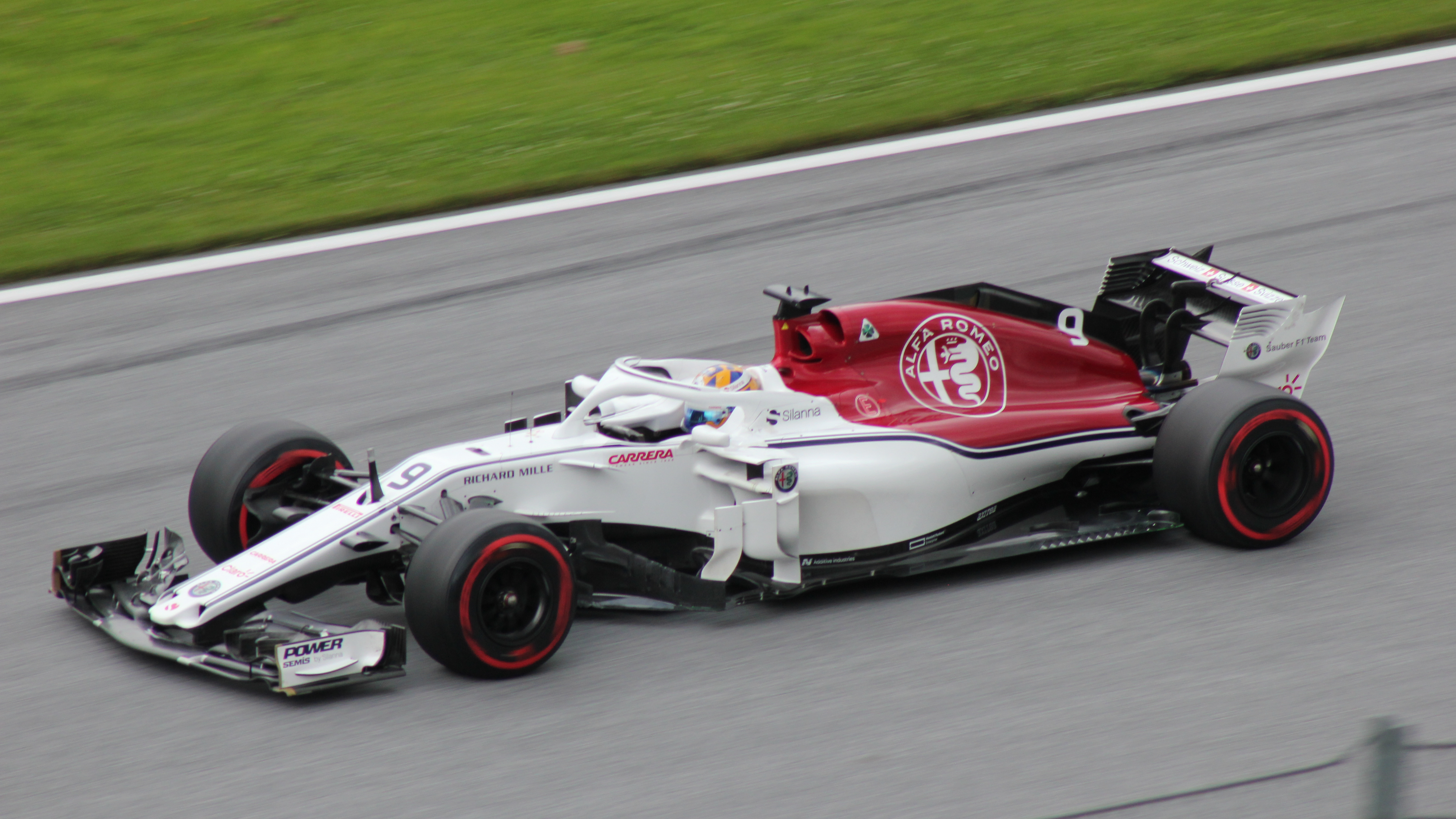
Ericsson driving for Alfa Romeo-Sauber at the 2018 Austrian Grand Prix

The most recent Formula One driver from Sweden is Marcus Ericsson. Making his debut at the 2014 Australian Grand Prix, Ericsson became the first Swedish driver to compete in a Formula One Grand Prix since Stefan Johansson raced in the 1991 Australian Grand Prix. He made his debut with the backmarker Caterham F1 Team, and struggled throughout the season. He was forced to sit out the final three races of the 2014 season as the team was placed into liquidation. He was signed by Sauber for the 2015 season and saw a slight reversal of fortune, picking up his first of 11 points finishes in Australia, finishing 18th in the championship. He maintained his Sauber drive up to 2018, with a best championship result of 17th in 2018 with 9 points. Having had two pointless seasons in 2016 and 2017, as well as being outscored by over 4 times the points in 2018 by his rookie team-mate Charles Leclerc, he was dropped from a race seat at Sauber and subsequently moved across to IndyCar for 2019.

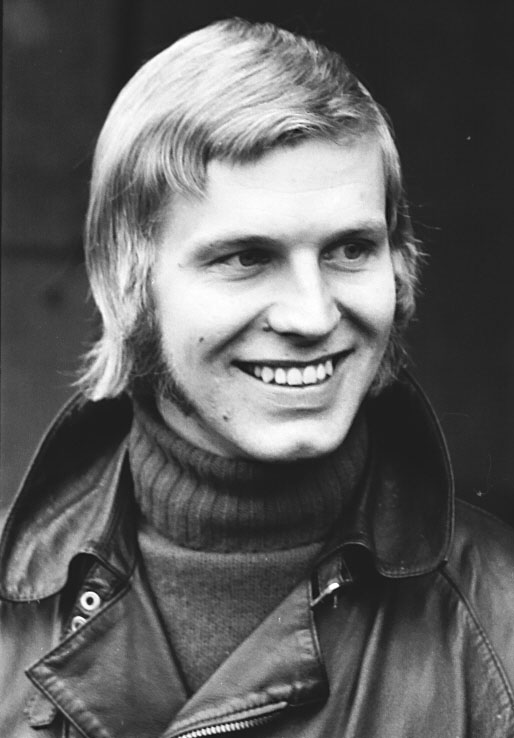
Reine Wisell in 1970

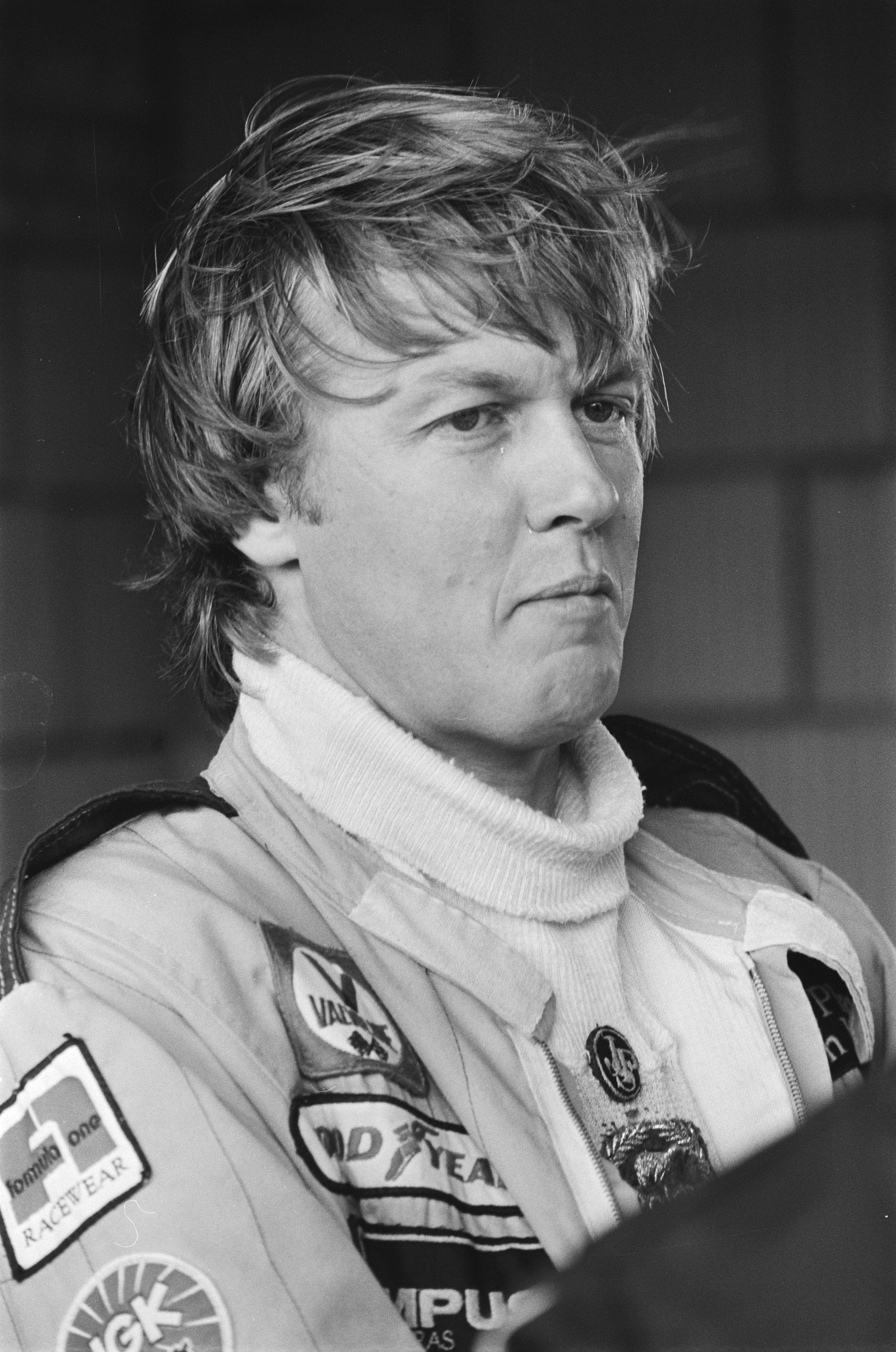
Ronnie Peterson in 1978

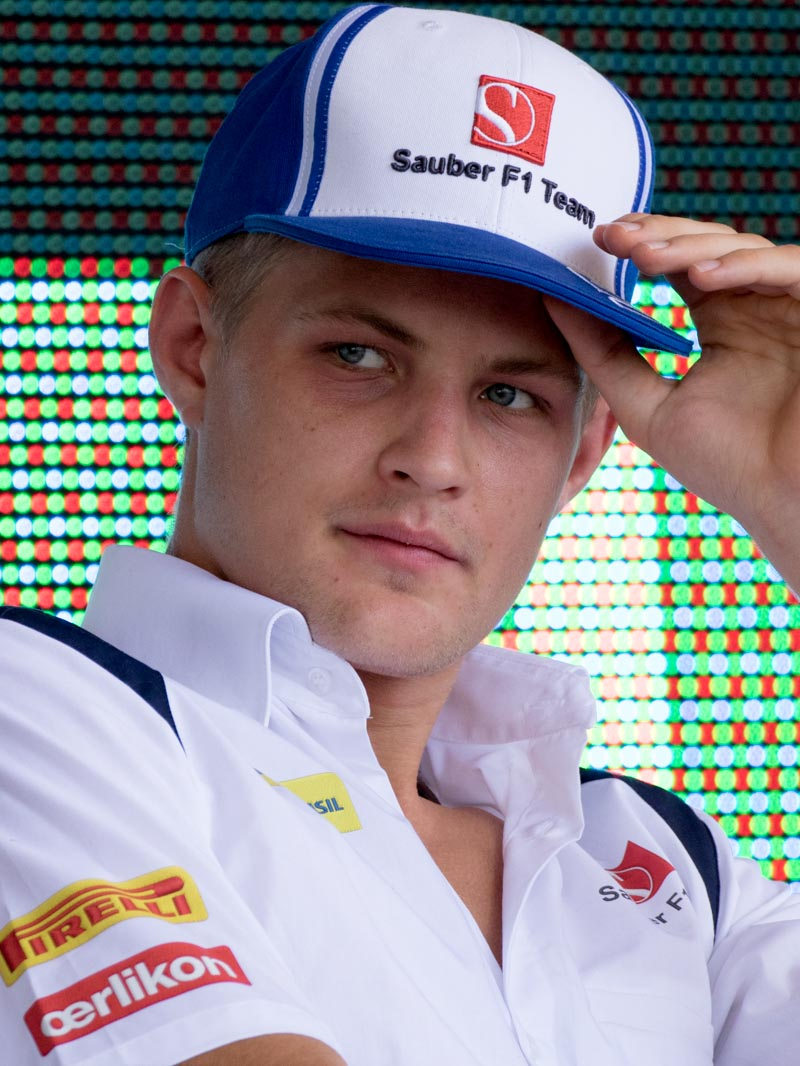
Marcus Ericsson in 2015

== Statistics ==
| Drivers | Active Years | Entries | Wins | Podiums | Career Points | Poles | Fastest Laps |
|---|---|---|---|---|---|---|---|
| Erik Lundgren | 1951 | 1 (0 starts) | 0 | 0 | 0 | 0 | 0 |
| Joakim Bonnier | 1956–1971 | 108 (104 starts) | 1 | 1 | 39 | 1 | 0 |
| Reine Wisell | 1970–1974 | 23 (22 starts) | 0 | 1 | 13 | 0 | 0 |
| Ronnie Peterson | 1970–1978 | 123 | 10 | 26 | 206 | 14 | 9 |
| Bertil Roos | 1974 | 1 | 0 | 0 | 0 | 0 | 0 |
| Torsten Palm | 1975 | 2 (1 start) | 0 | 0 | 0 | 0 | 0 |
| Conny Andersson | 1976–1977 | 5 (1 start) | 0 | 0 | 0 | 0 | 0 |
| Gunnar Nilsson | 1976–1977 | 32 (31 starts) | 1 | 4 | 31 | 0 | 1 |
| Stefan Johansson | 1980, 1983–1991 | 103 (79 starts) | 0 | 12 | 88 | 0 | 0 |
| Slim Borgudd | 1981–1982 | 15 (10 starts) | 0 | 0 | 1 | 0 | 0 |
| Marcus Ericsson | 2014–2018 | 97 | 0 | 0 | 18 | 0 | 0 |

== See also ==
- List of Formula One Grand Prix winners
