= Browallius =

Browallius is a surname. Notable people with the surname include:

- Carl Browallius (1868–1944), Swedish actor
- Irja Agnes Browallius (1901–1968), Swedish teacher, novelist, and short story writer
- Johannes Browallius (1707–1755), Finnish and Swedish Lutheran theologian
