= EL Special =

American sports prototype racing cars

- Category: Formula Libre
- Designer(s): Erik Lundgren

Technical specifications
- Chassis: Steel tube frame chassis covered in aluminum body
- Engine: Ford OHV V8 naturally-aspirated front-engined, rear-wheel-drive
- Power: 280 hp (209 kW)

Competition history

The EL Special, also known as the EL-Ford Special, Ford Ardun Special, or the Ford V8 Special, is a special custom-built open-wheel race car, designed and developed by Erik Lundgren, essentially built as a Formula Libre car, competing in a number of different motorsport disciplines, including open-wheel racing and sports car racing. It was originally built in 1950, but competed up until 1958. It was itself based on a Ford Anglia chassis, but was powered by a Ford flathead V8 engine, and used an aluminum body. It competed in a number of non-championship Formula Two and Formula One racing events, including an unsuccessful entry at the 1951 German Grand Prix, with Lundgren withdrawing before the practice session for the race.
