= Jo Bonnier =

Swedish racing driver (1930–1972)

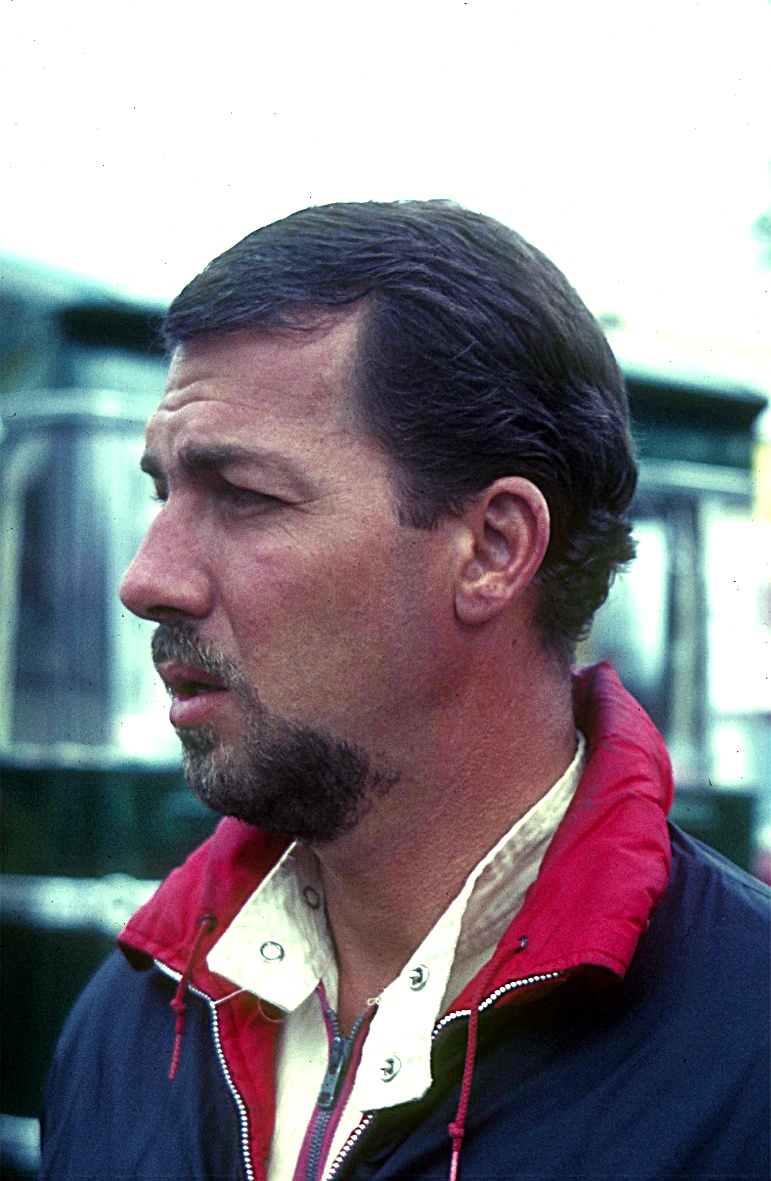
- Bonnier in 1966
- Born: Joakim Bonnier; 31 January 1930; Stockholm, Sweden
- Died: 11 June 1972 (aged 42); Circuit de la Sarthe, Le Mans, France
- Cause of death: Injuries sustained at the 1972 24 Hours of Le Mans
- Spouse: Marianne Ankarcrona (m. 1960)
- Children: 2
- Parent: Gert Bonnier (father)
- Family: Bonnier family

Formula One World Championship career
- Nationality: (Sweden) Swedish
- Active years: 1956–1971
- Team(s): Maserati, Centro Sud, privateer Maserati, BRM, Porsche, Walker, Bonnier
- Entries: 109 (104 starts)
- Championships: 0
- Wins: 1
- Podiums: 1
- Career points: 39
- Pole positions: 1
- Fastest laps: 0
- First entry: 1956 Italian Grand Prix
- First win: 1959 Dutch Grand Prix
- Last entry: 1971 United States Grand Prix

24 Hours of Le Mans career
- Years: 1957–1966, 1969–1970, 1972
- Teams: Maserati, Porsche, Serenissima, Ferrari, Chaparral, Filipinetti, Bonnier
- Best finish: 2nd (1964)
- Class wins: 0

Joakim "Jo" Bonnier (31 January 1930 – 11 June 1972) was a Swedish racing driver and team owner, who competed in Formula One from 1956 to 1971. Bonnier won the 1959 Dutch Grand Prix with BRM.

Born and raised in Stockholm, Bonnier was the son of geneticist Gert Bonnier and born into the wealthy Bonnier family, the controlling family of the eponymous Bonnier Group. Bonnier competed in Formula One for Maserati, Scuderia Centro Sud, BRM, Porsche, Rob Walker Racing and Ecurie Bonnier, winning the Dutch Grand Prix with BRM to become the first Swedish Formula One Grand Prix winner and finishing eighth in the World Drivers' Championship that year.

Outside of Formula One, Bonnier entered 13 editions of the 24 Hours of Le Mans from 1957 to 1972, finishing runner-up in 1964 alongside Graham Hill, driving the Ferrari 330P. During the latter, Bonnier died when his Lola T280 collided with traffic and left him critically injured. Until his death, Bonnier had been the chairman of the Grand Prix Drivers' Association.

== Early life ==
Bonnier was born in Stockholm, to the wealthy Bonnier family. His father, Gert, was a professor of genetics at Stockholm College, while many members of his extensive family were in the publishing business. He spoke six languages and, although his parents hoped that he would become a doctor, for a while it was his aspiration to enter the family publishing business. He attended Oxford University for a year, studying languages, then went to Paris, France, planning to learn about publishing.

== First competition ==
Bonnier began competitive racing in Sweden at the age of 17, on an old Harley-Davidson motorcycle. He returned home to Sweden in 1951 after his Paris trip, and later took part in several rallies as the proud owner of a Simca.

== Formula One ==
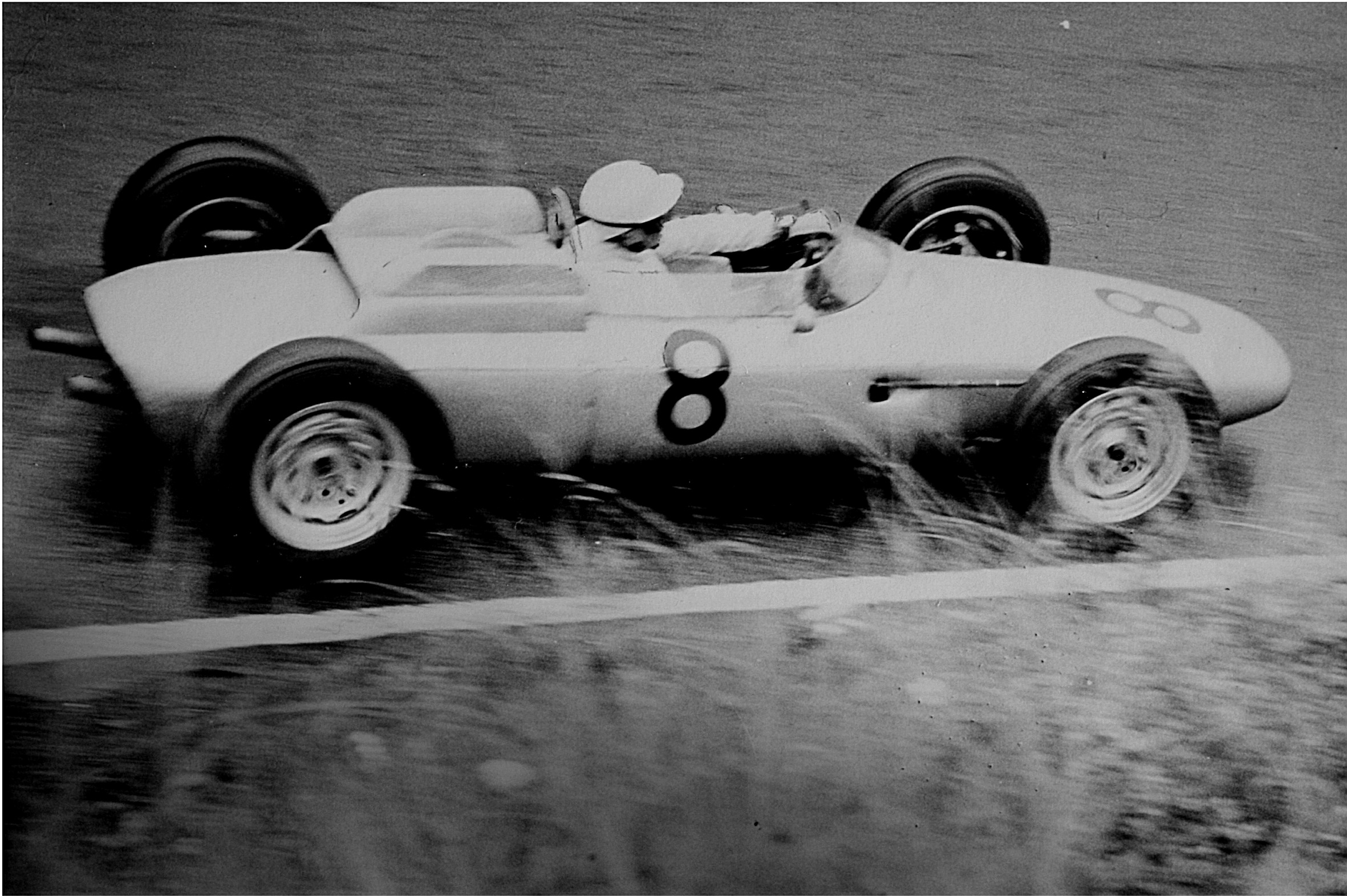
Bonnier at 1962 German Grand Prix driving a Porsche 804.

Bonnier entered Formula One in 1956, driving a Maserati. His racing career almost ended in September 1956 in a race at Imola. He debuted a 1500cc Maserati and moved up through the field following a bad start, passing Luigi Musso, and was gaining on leader Eugenio Castellotti at around two seconds per lap when he lost control after another car pulled directly into his path as they negotiated a fast corner. His Maserati struck a large rock at the edge of the road and catapulted. The other driver went underneath him as he turned over and over in the air and, while he was upside down, the crash helmet of his competitor made contact with his. Bonnier's Maserati landed on its side before skidding 75 feet and heading into a ditch, where it came to a stop against a pole. Bonnier was thrown out of the car and suffered concussion, several cracked ribs, and a broken vertebra. His car was completely written off.

Bonnier's greatest achievement in Formula One was taking victory for BRM in the 1959 Dutch Grand Prix at Zandvoort, when the notoriously unreliable car worked well for once (Dan Gurney and Hans Herrmann had bad crashes after brake failures). He also won the 1960 German Grand Prix with a Porsche 718, a race held for Formula Two in preparation for the rule change of 1961. Bonnier was one of the driving forces behind the Grand Prix Drivers' Association. Despite his win for BRM, Bonnier did not drive for many works teams throughout his career, with only one-offs as a replacement driver for Lotus, Brabham and Honda. After his debut in a works Maserati, he then drove for his own Joakim Bonnier Racing Team and for Mimmo Dei's Scuderia Centro Sud in the late 50s, before finding a spot in the BRM and Porsche teams.

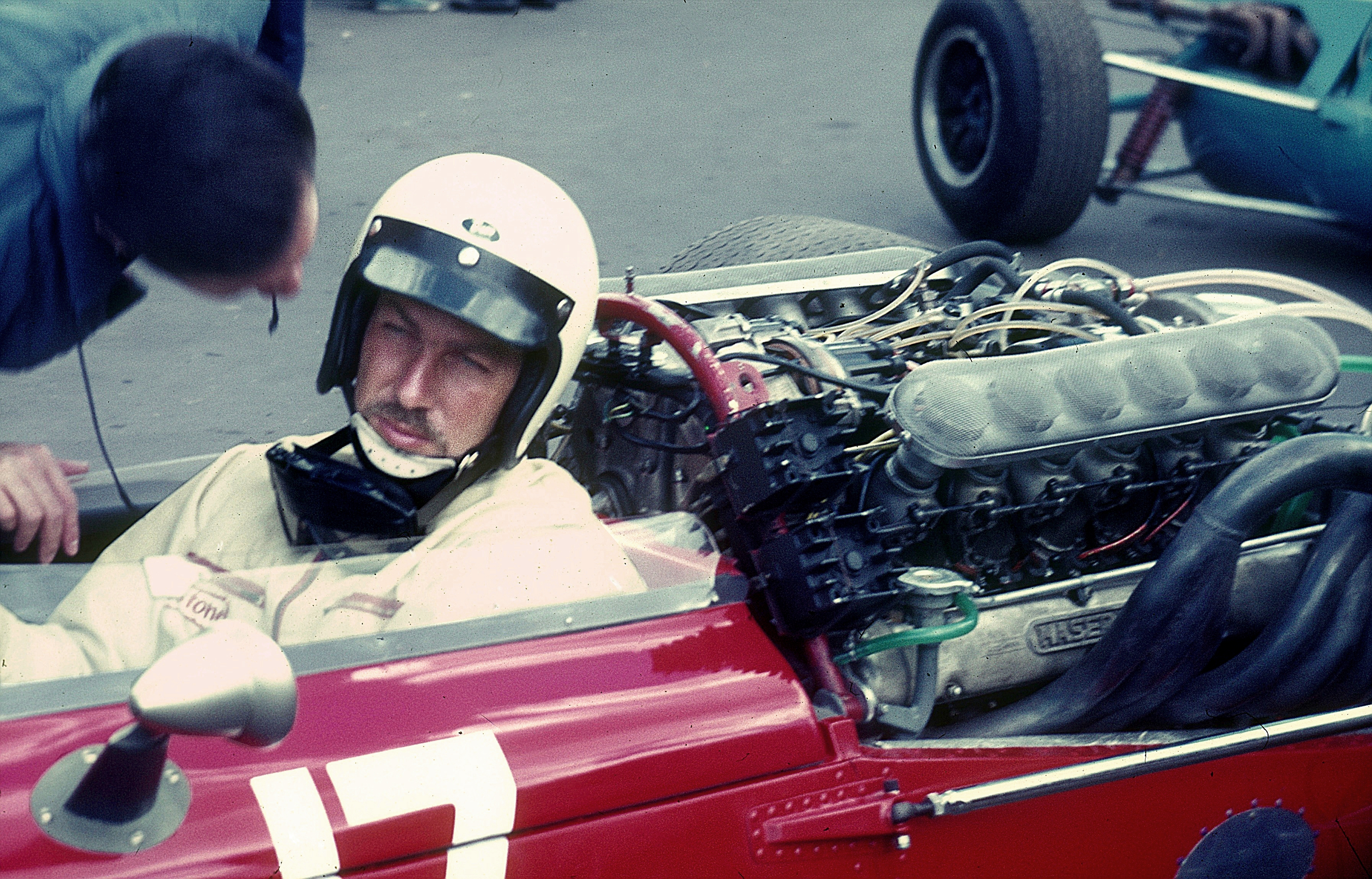
Bonnier in 1966.

After Porsche quit Grand Prix racing at the end of the 1962 season, Bonnier switched to Rob Walker Racing Team, the only privateer to have scored wins in World Championship events, where he drove Coopers and Brabhams, scoring few points.

In 1966, Bonnier reformed his own team as Anglo-Suisse Racing Team (later to be renamed Ecurie Bonnier), but his interest in Formula One gradually diminished. His last full season was 1968, in which he traded his old Cooper T86 for an old McLaren. He raced occasionally in Formula One until 1971. In 1966, along with American racing drivers Phil Hill, Richie Ginther and Carroll Shelby, he was racing advisor to the 1966 motor racing epic Grand Prix starring James Garner. All the aforementioned (including Garner, who did all his own driving) were employed as drivers for the racing scenes. While filming the 1966 Belgian Grand Prix at the notorious and extremely fast Spa-Francorchamps circuit, Bonnier, along with more than half the field including Jackie Stewart, Bob Bondurant, Graham Hill and Denny Hulme, crashed out on the first lap of the race. According to Phil Hill, Bonnier went through an upstairs window at a house next to the track and could not take part in the later filming on the circuit.

== Sports car racer ==
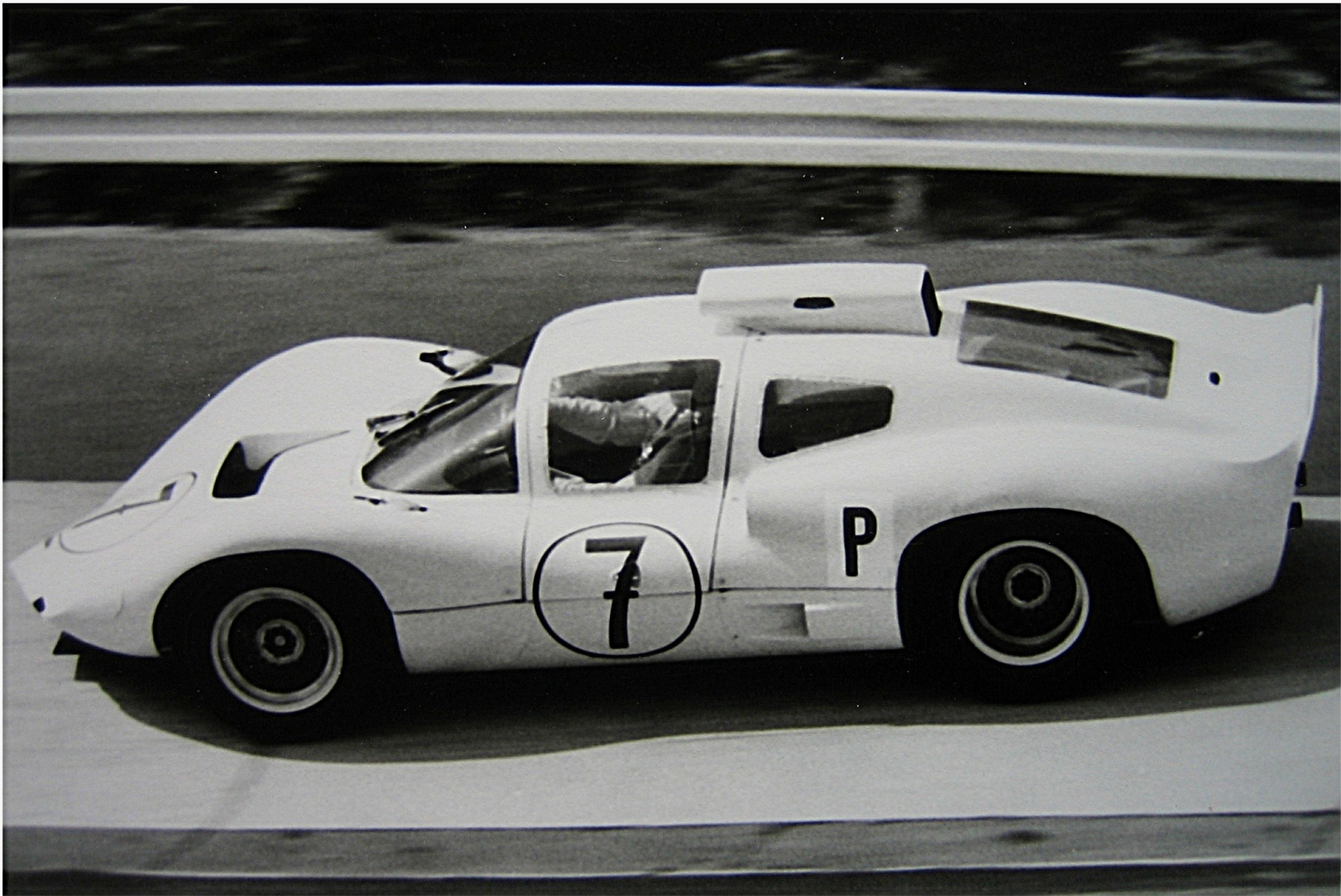
Bonnier in a Chaparral, during practice at the Nürburgring in 1966

Alongside Formula One, Bonnier also took part in many sports car races. He won the 1960 Targa Florio, co-driving a works Porsche 718 with Hans Herrmann, and in 1962 took a Ferrari 250 TRI entered by Count Giovanni Volpi to top honours in the 12 Hours of Sebring, sharing the car with Lucien Bianchi. In 1963, he was once again winner at the Targa Florio, with Carlo Mario Abate in another works Porsche 718.

1964 was Bonnier's best year in sports car racing, where he co-drove a Ferrari P entered by Maranello Concessionaires with Graham Hill, taking a 330P to second place in the 24 Hours of Le Mans and to a win at Montlhéry, while a 12-hour race in Reims also gave him a first place in a 250LM. He then won the 1000km Nürburgring in a Chaparral in 1966 (with Phil Hill), his last win in a major sports car event, but still managed to snatch victories in the minor 1000 km of Barcelona at Montjuïc in 1971 (with Ronnie Peterson), and the 4 Hours of Le Mans in 1972 (with Hughes de Fierlant).

Bonnier purchased a McLaren M6B to campaign in the 1968 Can-Am series. In the first outing at the Karlskoga Sweden GP, Bonnier had the pole but an off course excursion on the first lap caused him to finish second to David Piper in a Ferrari 330P3/4. He then ran his McLaren in five of the six Can-Am races with his best finish an eighth at Las Vegas. He was plagued with mechanical problems most of the season. However, he finished third in the M6B at the Mt Fuji 200-mile race.

In 1970, Bonnier drove a Lola T210 to victory in the European 2-Litre Sports Car Championship, securing the drivers title at the end of the season with 48 points.

== Other ventures ==
=== Team managements ===
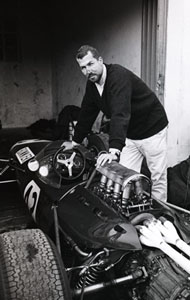
Joakim Bonnier in 1965

By the early seventies, Bonnier had taken to managing his team, entering several cars in World Sportscar Championship events, and taking a backseat to driving.

=== Safety advocacy ===
Bonnier had also taken a lead in the fight for track safety, which had started around that time.

== Death ==
Bonnier was killed in a crash during the 1972 24 Hours of Le Mans. On the straight between Mulsanne Corner and Indianapolis, his open-top Lola T280-Cosworth collided with a Ferrari Daytona driven by a Swiss amateur driver Florian Vetsch. His car was catapulted over the Armco barriers and into the trees next to the track and he was killed instantly. According to Vic Elford, who was driving a factory-entered Alfa Romeo Tipo 33 and who had stopped to assist Vetsch escape from his burning Ferrari, the last he had seen of Bonnier's Lola was that it was "spinning into the air like a helicopter".

== Racing record ==
=== Complete Formula One World Championship results ===
(key) (Races in bold indicate pole position) (Races in italics indicate fastest lap)

Year	Entrant	Chassis	Engine	1	2	3	4	5	6	7	8	9	10	11	12	13	WDC	Pts
1956	Officine Alfieri Maserati	Maserati 250F	Maserati 250F1 2.5 L6	ARG	MON	500	BEL	FRA	GBR	GER	ITA; Ret						NC	0
1957	Scuderia Centro Sud	Maserati 250F	Maserati 250F1 2.5 L6	ARG; 7						PES; Ret	ITA; Ret						NC	0
1957	Jo Bonnier	Maserati 250F	Maserati 250F1 2.5 L6		MON; DNA	500	FRA	GBR; Ret	GER								NC	0
1958	Scuderia Centro Sud	Maserati 250F	Maserati 250F1 2.5 L6	ARG; DNA							GER; Ret						20th	3
1958	Jo Bonnier	Maserati 250F	Maserati 250F1 2.5 L6		MON; Ret	NED; 10	500	BEL; 9		GBR; Ret		POR; Ret					20th	3
1958	Giorgio Scarlatti	Maserati 250F	Maserati 250F1 2.5 L6						FRA; 8								20th	3
1958	Owen Racing Organisation	BRM P25	BRM P25 2.5 L4										ITA; Ret	MOR; 4			20th	3
1959	Owen Racing Organisation	BRM P25	BRM P25 2.5 L4	MON; Ret	500	**NED**; 1	FRA; Ret	GBR; Ret	GER; 5	POR; Ret	ITA; 8	USA					8th	10
1960	Owen Racing Organisation	BRM P25	BRM P25 2.5 L4	ARG; 7													18th	4
1960	Owen Racing Organisation	BRM P48	BRM P25 2.5 L4		MON; 5	500	NED; Ret	BEL; Ret	FRA; Ret	GBR; Ret	POR; Ret	ITA	USA; 5				18th	4
1961	Porsche System Engineering	Porsche 787	Porsche 547/3 1.5 F4	MON; 12	NED; 11												15th	3
1961	Porsche System Engineering	Porsche 718	Porsche 547/3 1.5 F4			BEL; 7	FRA; 7	GBR; 5	GER; Ret	ITA; Ret	USA; 6						15th	3
1962	Porsche System Engineering	Porsche 804	Porsche 753 1.5 F8	NED; 7		BEL; WD	FRA; 10	GBR; Ret	GER; 7	ITA; 6	USA; 13	RSA					15th	3
1962	Porsche System Engineering	Porsche 718	Porsche 547/3 1.5 F4		MON; 5												15th	3
1963	R.R.C. Walker Racing Team	Cooper T60	Climax FWMV 1.5 V8	MON; 7	BEL; 5	NED; 11	FRA; NC										11th	6
1963	R.R.C. Walker Racing Team	Cooper T66	Climax FWMV 1.5 V8					GBR; Ret	GER; 6	ITA; 7	USA; 8	MEX; 5	RSA; 6				11th	6
1964	R.R.C. Walker Racing Team	Cooper T66	Climax FWMV 1.5 V8	MON; 5													15th	3
1964	R.R.C. Walker Racing Team	Brabham BT11	BRM P56 1.5 V8		NED; 9	BEL; Ret	FRA	GBR; Ret	GER; Ret								15th	3
1964	R.R.C. Walker Racing Team	Brabham BT7	Climax FWMV 1.5 V8							AUT; 6	ITA; 12	USA; Ret	MEX; Ret				15th	3
1965	R.R.C. Walker Racing Team	Brabham BT7	Climax FWMV 1.5 V8	RSA; Ret	MON; 7	BEL; Ret	FRA; Ret	GBR; 7	NED; Ret	GER; 7	ITA; 7	USA; 8	MEX; Ret				NC	0
1966	Anglo-Suisse Racing Team	Cooper T81	Maserati 9/F1 3.0 V12	MON; NC	BEL; Ret			NED; 7	GER; Ret	ITA; Ret	USA; NC	MEX; 6					17th	1
1966	Anglo-Suisse Racing Team	Brabham BT22	Climax FPF 2.8 L4			FRA; NC											17th	1
1966	Anglo-Suisse Racing Team	Brabham BT7	Climax FWMV 1.5 V8				GBR; Ret										17th	1
1967	Joakim Bonnier Racing Team	Cooper T81	Maserati 9/F1 3.0 V12	RSA; Ret	MON	NED	BEL; Ret	FRA	GBR; Ret	GER; 6^{1}	CAN; 8	ITA; Ret	USA; 6	MEX; 10			15th	3
1968	Joakim Bonnier Racing Team	Cooper T81	Maserati 9/F1 3.0 V12	RSA; Ret													22nd	3
1968	Joakim Bonnier Racing Team	McLaren M5A	BRM P101 3.0 V12		ESP; DNA	MON; DNQ	BEL; Ret	NED; 8	FRA	GBR; Ret	GER; DNA	ITA; 6	CAN; Ret	USA; NC			22nd	3
1968	Joakim Bonnier Racing Team	Honda RA301	Honda RA301E 3.0 V12												MEX; 5		22nd	3
1969	Ecurie Bonnier	Lotus 63	Ford Cosworth DFV 3.0 V8	RSA	ESP	MON	NED	FRA	GBR; Ret								NC	0
1969	Ecurie Bonnier	Lotus 49B	Ford Cosworth DFV 3.0 V8							GER; Ret	ITA	CAN	USA	MEX			NC	0
1970	Ecurie Bonnier	McLaren M7C	Ford Cosworth DFV 3.0 V8	RSA	ESP	MON	BEL	NED	FRA	GBR	GER	AUT	ITA; DNQ	CAN	USA; Ret	MEX	NC	0
1971	Ecurie Bonnier	McLaren M7C	Ford Cosworth DFV 3.0 V8	RSA; Ret	ESP	MON	NED	FRA	GBR	GER; DNQ	AUT; DNS	ITA; 10	CAN	USA; 16			NC	0

Notes

- **^1** – Bonnier was 6th at 1967 German Grand Prix but he was given points for the 5th place because F2-drivers who competed in the same race were ineligible to score points.

=== Complete Formula One non-championship results ===
(key) (Races in bold indicate pole position) (Races in italics indicate fastest lap)

Year	Entrant	Chassis	Engine	1	2	3	4	5	6	7	8	9	10	11	12	13	14	15	16	17	18	19	20	21
1957	Jo Bonnier	Maserati 250F	Maserati 250F1 2.5 L6	SYR	PAU	GLV	NAP	RMS; Ret	CAE; 4															
1957	Scuderia Centro Sud	Maserati 250F	Maserati 250F1 2.5 L6							INT; 4														
1957	Owen Racing Organisation	BRM P25	BRM P25 2.5 L4								MOD; Ret	MOR												
1958	Jo Bonnier	Maserati 250F	Maserati 250F1 2.5 L6	GLV	SYR; 2	AIN	INT; Ret	CAE; 2																
1959	Owen Racing Organisation	BRM P25	BRM P25 2.5 L4	GLV; 4	AIN; Ret	INT	OUL; DNA	SIL																
1960	Owen Racing Organisation	BRM P25	BRM P25 2.5 L4	GLV; 6																				
1960	Owen Racing Organisation	BRM P48	BRM P25 2.5 L4		INT; Ret	SIL	LOM; 3	OUL; 5																
1961	Scuderia Colonia	Lotus 18	Climax FPF 1.5 L4	LOM	GLV	PAU; 2		VIE; WD	AIN															
1961	Porsche System Engineering	Porsche 718	Porsche 547/3 1.5 F4				**BRX**; Ret			SYR; 3	NAP	LON		**SOL**; 2	KAN; 2	DAN	MOD; 2	FLG; 3	OUL; WD	LEW	VAL	RAN; 3	NAT; 3	RSA; 3
1961	UDT-Laystall Racing	Lotus 18/21	Climax FPF 1.5 L4										SIL; 11											
1962	Porsche System Engineering	Porsche 718	Porsche 547/3 1.5 F4	CAP; 3																				
1962	Scuderia SSS Republica di Venezia	Porsche 718	Porsche 547/3 1.5 F4		BRX; 2	LOM; 3	LAV	GLV	PAU; 12	AIN	INT; 12	NAP	MAL; 6	CLP	RMS; 8									
1962	Porsche System Engineering	Porsche 804	Porsche 753 1.5 F8													SOL; 2	KAN; 3	MED	DAN		MEX; DNA	RAN	NAT	
1962	R.R.C. Walker Racing Team	Lotus 24	Climax FWMV 1.5 V8																	OUL; Ret				
1963	R.R.C. Walker Racing Team	Cooper T60	Climax FWMV 1.5 V8	LOM	GLV	PAU; Ret	IMO; Ret			INT; 5	ROM	SOL; 9		MED; 4	AUT; Ret									
1963	R.R.C. Walker Racing Team	Lotus 24	Climax FWMV 1.5 V8					SYR; 5	AIN															
1963	R.R.C. Walker Racing Team	Cooper T66	Climax FWMV 1.5 V8										KAN; 5			OUL; Ret	RAN							
1964	R.R.C. Walker Racing Team	Cooper T66	Climax FWMV 1.5 V8	DMT; 2	NWT; Ret	SYR; 4	AIN; 4	INT; 16																
1964	R.R.C. Walker Racing Team	Brabham BT11	BRM P56 1.5 V8						SOL; 5	MED	RAN													
1965	R.R.C. Walker Racing Team	Brabham BT7	Climax FWMV 1.5 V8	ROC; 3	SYR; 4	SMT; 5	INT; 5	MED; Ret																
1965	R.R.C. Walker Racing Team	Lotus 25	Climax FWMV 1.5 V8						RAN; Ret															
1966	R.R.C. Walker Racing Team	Lotus 25	Climax FWMV 1.5 V8	RSA; Ret																				
1966	R.R.C. Walker Racing Team	Brabham BT11	BRM P60 2.0 V8		SYR; 5																			
1966	Anglo-Suisse Racing Team	Cooper T81	Maserati 9/F1 3.0 V12			INT; 3	OUL																	
1967	Joakim Bonnier Racing Team	Cooper T81	Maserati 9/F1 3.0 V12	ROC	SPR	INT; Ret	SYR; 5	OUL	ESP															
1968	Joakim Bonnier Racing Team	McLaren M5A	BRM P101 3.0 V12	ROC; Ret	INT; Ret	OUL; Ret																		
1969	Ecurie Bonnier	Lotus 49B	Ford Cosworth DFV 3.0 V8	ROC	INT	MAD	OUL; DNS																	
1971	Ecurie Bonnier	Lola T190 (F5000)	Chevrolet 5.0 V8	ARG; NC	ROC	QUE	SPR	INT	RIN	OUL	VIC													

=== Complete 24 Hours of Le Mans results ===
Year	Team	Co-Drivers	Car	Class	Laps	Pos.	Class Pos.
1957	(Italy) Officine Alfieri Maserati	(Italy) Giorgio Scarlatti	Maserati 300S	S 3.0	73	DNF	DNF
1958	(Spain) Francisco Godia	(Spain) Francisco Godia-Sales	Maserati 300S	S 3.0	142	DNF	DNF
1959	(West Germany) Porsche KG	(West Germany) Wolfgang von Trips	Porsche 718 RSK	S 2.0	182	DNF	DNF
1960	(West Germany) Porsche KG	(United Kingdom) Graham Hill	Porsche 718/4 RS	S 2.0	191	DNF	DNF
1961	(West Germany) Porsche System Engineering	(United States) Dan Gurney	Porsche 718/4 RS Coupe	S 2.0	262	DNF	DNF
1962	(Italy) Scuderia SSS Republica di Venezia	(United States) Dan Gurney	Ferrari 250 TRI/61	E 3.0	30	DNF	DNF
1963	(West Germany) Porsche System Engineering	(South Africa) Tony Maggs	Porsche 718/8 GTR Coupe	P 3.0	109	DNF	DNF
1964	(United Kingdom) Maranello Concessionaires	(United Kingdom) Graham Hill	Ferrari 330P	P 5.0	344	**2nd**	**2nd**
1965	(United Kingdom) Maranello Concessionaires Ltd.	(United Kingdom) David Piper	Ferrari 365 P2	P 5.0	101	DNF	DNF
1966	(United States) Chaparral Cars Inc.	(United States) Phil Hill	Chaparral 2D-Chevrolet	P+5.0	111	DNF	DNF
1969	(Switzerland) Scuderia Filipinetti	(United States) Masten Gregory	Lola T70 Mk.IIIB-Chevrolet	S 5.0	134	DNF	DNF
1970	(Switzerland) Scuderia Filipinetti	(Sweden) Reine Wisell	Ferrari 512S	S 5.0	36	DNF	DNF
1972	Ecurie Bonnier Switzerland	(France) Gérard Larrousse (Netherlands) Gijs van Lennep	Lola T280-Ford Cosworth	S 3.0	213	DNF	DNF

=== Complete Canadian-American Challenge Cup results ===
(key) (Races in bold indicate pole position) (Races in italics indicate fastest lap)

Year	Team	Car	Engine	1	2	3	4	5	6	7	8	9	10	11	Pos	Pts
1968	Ecurie Suisse	McLaren M6B	Chevrolet	ROA; 18	BRI; Ret	EDM; Ret	LAG	RIV; Ret	LVG; 8						NC	0
1969	Scuderia Filipinetti	Lola T70 Mk.3B	Chevrolet	MOS	MTR	WGL; 7	EDM	MOH	ROA	BRI	MCH	LAG	RIV	TWS	27th	4
1970	Ecurie Bonnier	Lola T70 Mk.3B	Chevrolet	MOS	MTR	WGL; 11	EDM	MOH	ROA	ATL	BRA	LAG	RIV		NC	0
