= Ingrid Lang-Fagerström =

Swedish harpist (1897–1990)

- Born: Ingrid Lang; 6 March 1897; Stockholm, Sweden
- Died: 15 August 1990 (aged 93); Lidingö, Sweden
- Burial place: Lidingö cemetery
- Education: Royal College of Music, Stockholm
- Occupation: Harpist
- Children: Anna Fagerström-Stångberg
- Parents: Josef Lang (father); Anna Lang (mother)

Ingrid Lang-Fagerström (1897–1990) was a Swedish harpist at the royal chapel in Stockholm.

== Life and work ==
Ingrid was born 6 March 1897 in Stockholm to the classical harpists Anna Lang and Josef Lang who were both employed with Kungliga Hovkapellet, the Swedish royal chapel orchestra.

Ingrid studied at the Royal College of Music, Stockholm (1912–1918) with her father as well as with Lennart Lundberg for piano.

After her mother's death in 1920, Ingrid assumed the position of court harpist and was employed in the chapel from 1921–1962. According to a 1970 interview, "she was an esteemed and often hired harpist, both in orchestras and soloists."

When Ingrid was 27 years old, she had a daughter, Anna Fagerström-Stångberg (born 8 Dec 1924), who in turn performed as a harpist in Hovkapellet (like her mother and grandmother) between the years 1954-60.

From 1936, Ingrid taught at the Royal College until 1941.

Ingrid Lang-Fagerström was elected as member number 778 of the Royal Swedish Academy of Music on 22 February 1973.

She died 15 August 1990 in Lidingö and is buried in Lidingö cemetery.
