= Anna Lang (harpist) =

Swedish harpist

- Born: Anna Nordqvist; 5 July 1874; Stockholm, Sweden
- Died: 12 December 1920 (aged 46); Lidingö, Sweden
- Education: Royal College of Music, Stockholm
- Occupation: Harpist
- Spouse: Josef Lang
- Children: Ingrid Lang
- Father: Conrad Nordqvist

Anna Lang, née Nordqvist (Stockholm, 5 July 1874 – 12 December 1920) was a Swedish court harpist.

== Life and work ==
Lang was the daughter of the conductor of the Kungliga Hovkapellet, Conrad Nordqvist. She received the von Beskow scholarship in 1883, became a student at Royal College of Music, Stockholm 1887, and was a harpist at Hovkapellet from 1890 until her death in 1920.

She married her teacher, the harp composer Josef Lang in 1895; their daughter, Ingrid Lang-Fagerström (1897–1990), was also a harpist in Hovkapellet, the Swedish royal chapel orchestra until 1962.

Anna Lang died on 12 December 1920 in Lidingö. She and her husband are buried in Lidingö cemetery.

== See also ==
- Charlotta Seuerling
- Marie Pauline Åhman

== Sources ==
- Anna Lang, född Nordqvist i Adolf Lindgren och Nils Personne, Svenskt porträttgalleri (1897), volym XXI. Tonkonstnärer och sceniska artister
- Profil på Hovkapellets webbplats.
