= Ockelbo-Lundgren =

Swedish racing driver

Erik Lundgren
- Born: 19 February 1919
- Died: 16 September 1967 (aged 48)

Formula One World Championship career
- Nationality: Swedish
- Active years: 1951
- Team: Erik Lundgren
- Engines: Ford
- Entries: 1 (0 starts)
- Championships: 0
- Wins: 0
- Podiums: 0
- Career points: 0
- Pole positions: 0
- Fastest laps: 0
- First entry: 1951 German Grand Prix
- Last entry: 1951 German Grand Prix

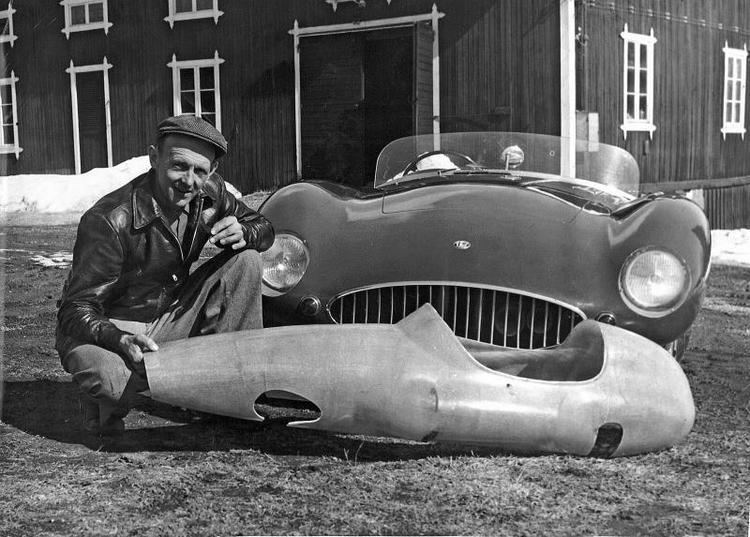
Erik Lundgren and his Alfa-based "Ferrari"

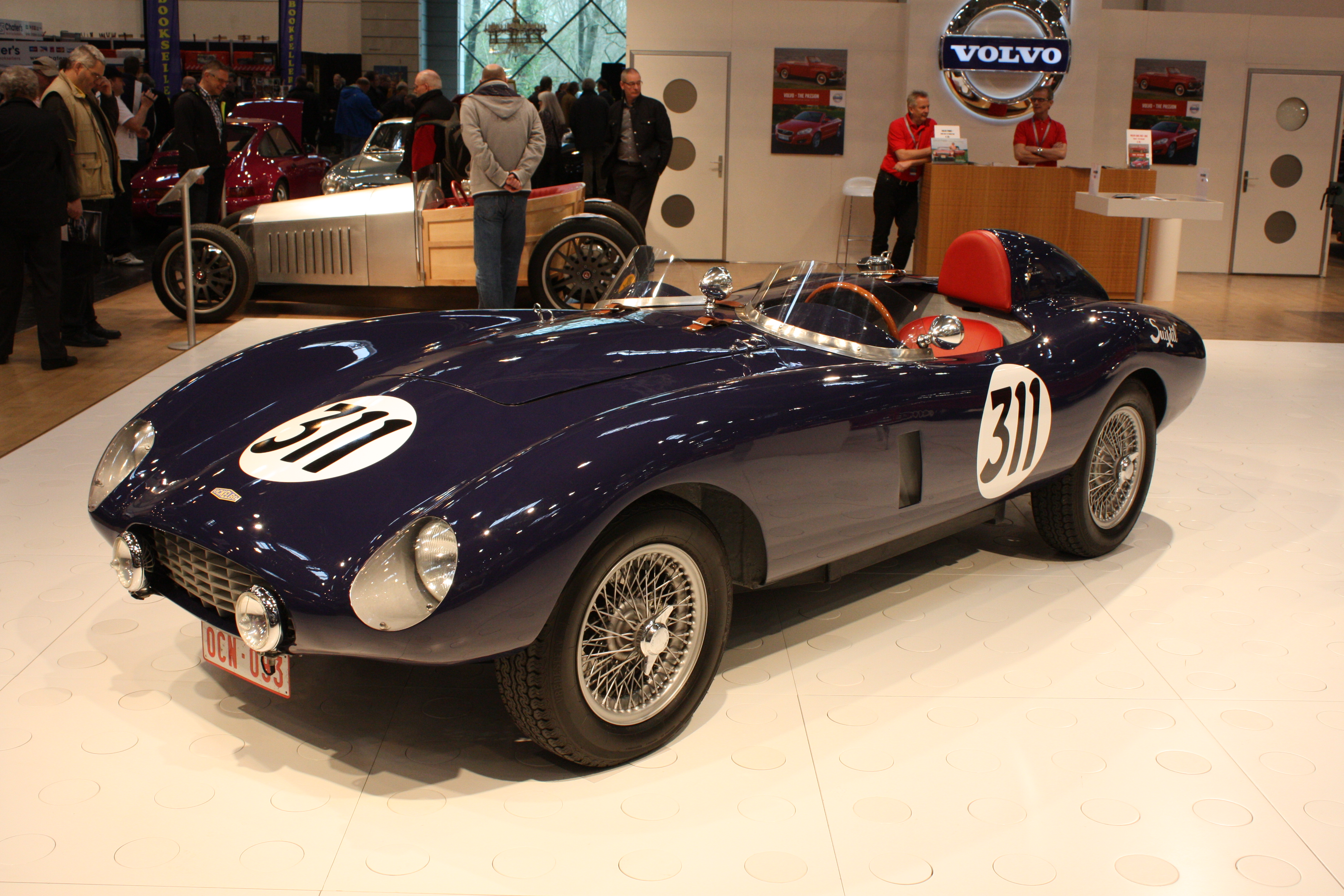
OCKELBO-VOLVO 000 Gen1 000 1953 (front left)

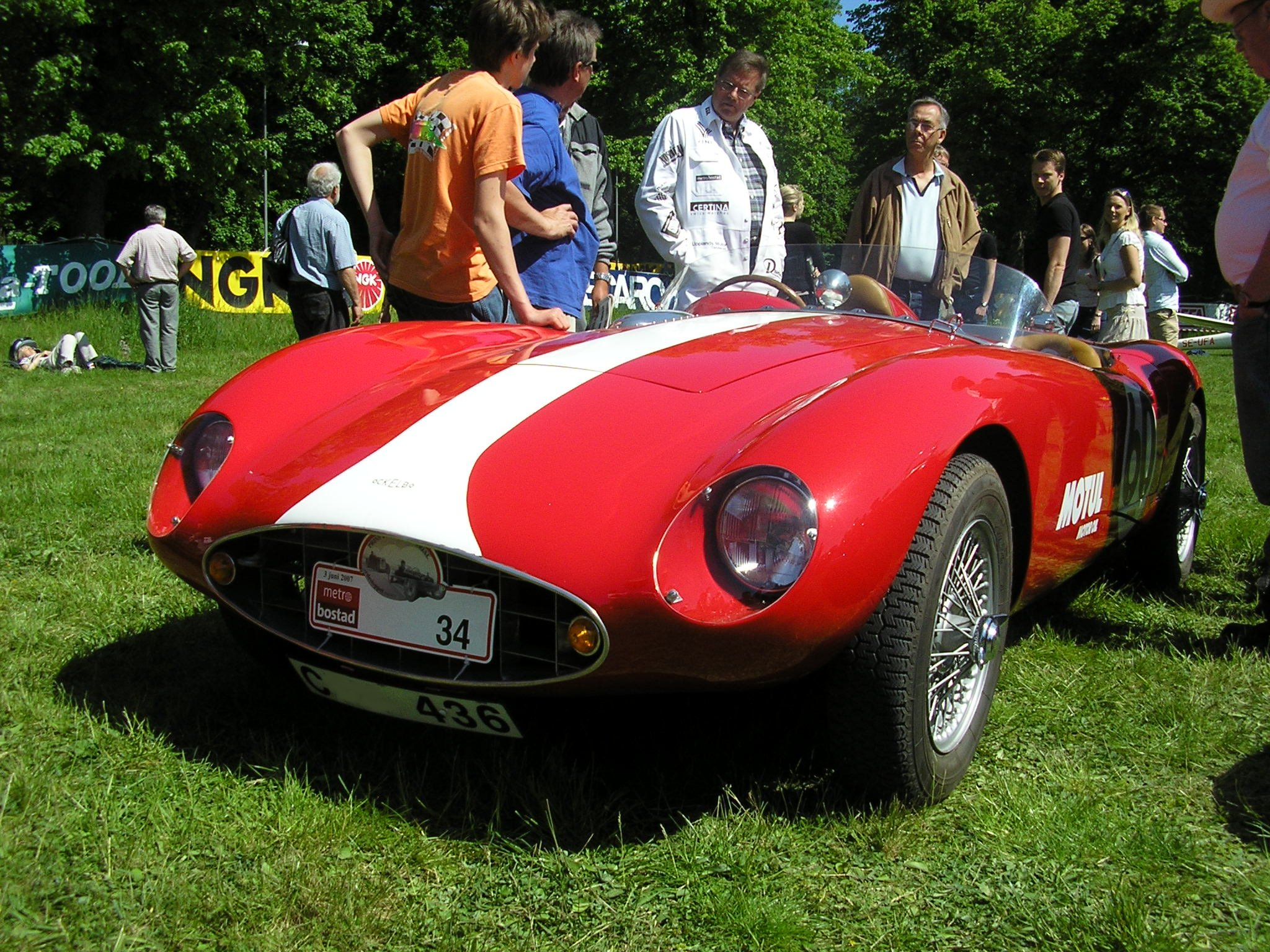
1954 Ockelbo car, based on Volvo P1900 parts

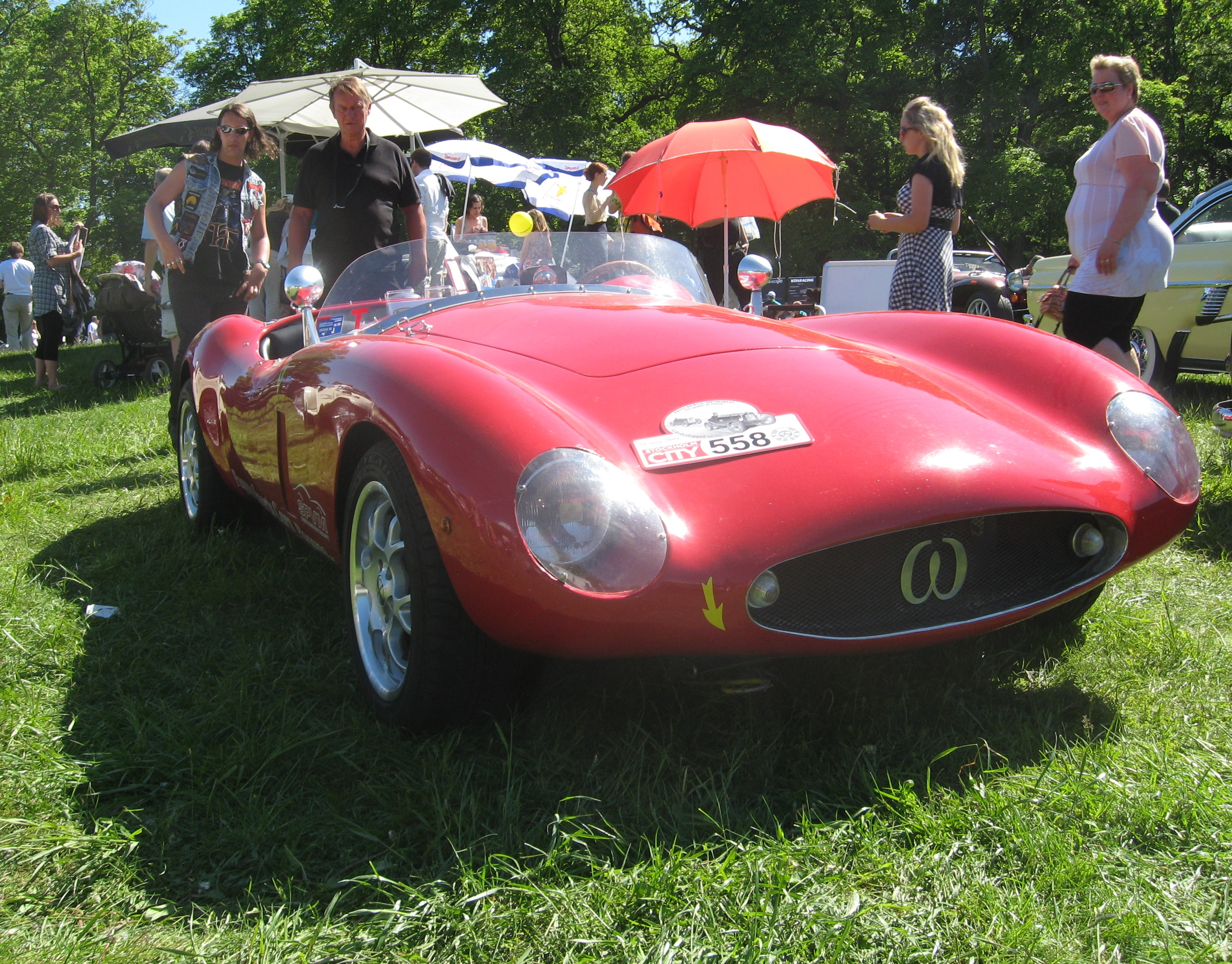
2002 Pagano, based on Alfa-Romeo parts

Ockelbo-Lundgren was the nickname of Erik Lundgren (19 February 1919 – 16 September 1967), a Swedish racing driver that produced replica cars and boats under the name Ockelbo.

He first became known during the 1940s as "Trollkarlen från Ockelbo" (The Wizard from Ockelbo) when he participated in several races in a Ford 38 powered by a V8 engine with eight carburettors producing 280 hp – at speeds up to 220 km/h.

Lundgren was the first Swedish driver to enter a Formula One race when he entered the 1951 German Grand Prix, but withdrew before the event.

He built and sold tuning items and in the mid-1950s he heard about a burned-out Alfa Romeo Giulietta Sprint and got the idea to make his own bodywork for it. He made a fibreglass mould using Uffe Norinder's Ferrari 500 Mondial and then started making his own bodies. They were considered very good (according to some better than the original) and could take many different donors for chassis and drive line, like VW Beetle, Saab, DKW, MG, Simca, Porsche, etc. As of 2014, the Ockelbo-Ferrari was still made (under the Pagano brand).

Later Lundgren also made fibreglass boats, from the company Ockelbo-Båtar AB that was in business until 1979.

== Formula One World Championship results ==
(key) (Races in bold indicate pole position; Races in italics indicate fastest lap)

Year	Entrant	Chassis	Engine	1	2	3	4	5	6	7	8	WDC	Points
1951	Erik Lundgren	EL Special	Ford V8	SUI	500	BEL	FRA	GBR	GER; DNA	ITA	ESP	NC	0
