= Gert Bonnier =

Swedish geneticist

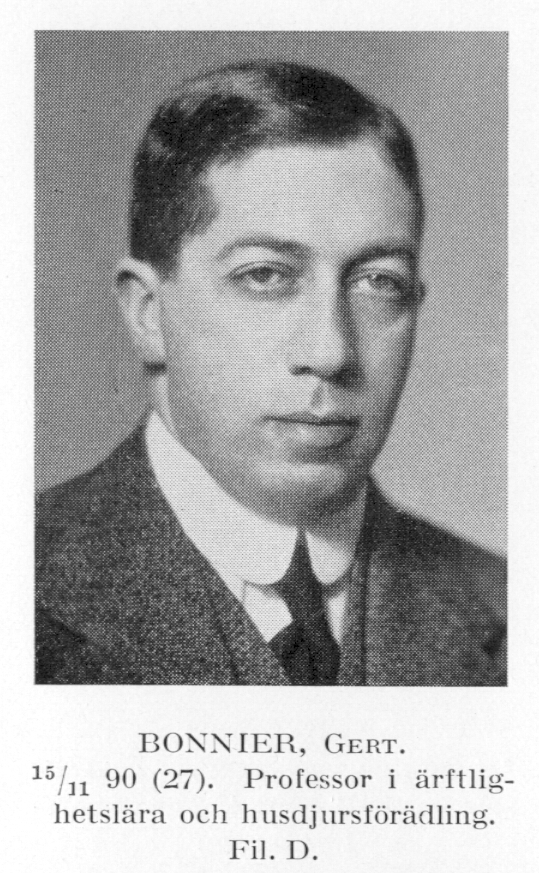

Gert Bonnier (15 November 1890 – 11 January 1961) was a Swedish geneticist and Drosophila researcher. He was a professor in the zoology department at Stockholm College.

== Family life ==
A member of the Bonnier family, Bonnier was the third of four sons of Karl Otto Bonnier, a publisher who served as leader of the Albert Bonniers förlag publishing house. Unlike his three brothers, Gert did not work at his father's publishing house.
