= Irja Agnes Browallius =

Swedish teacher, novelist and short story writer

Irja Browallius
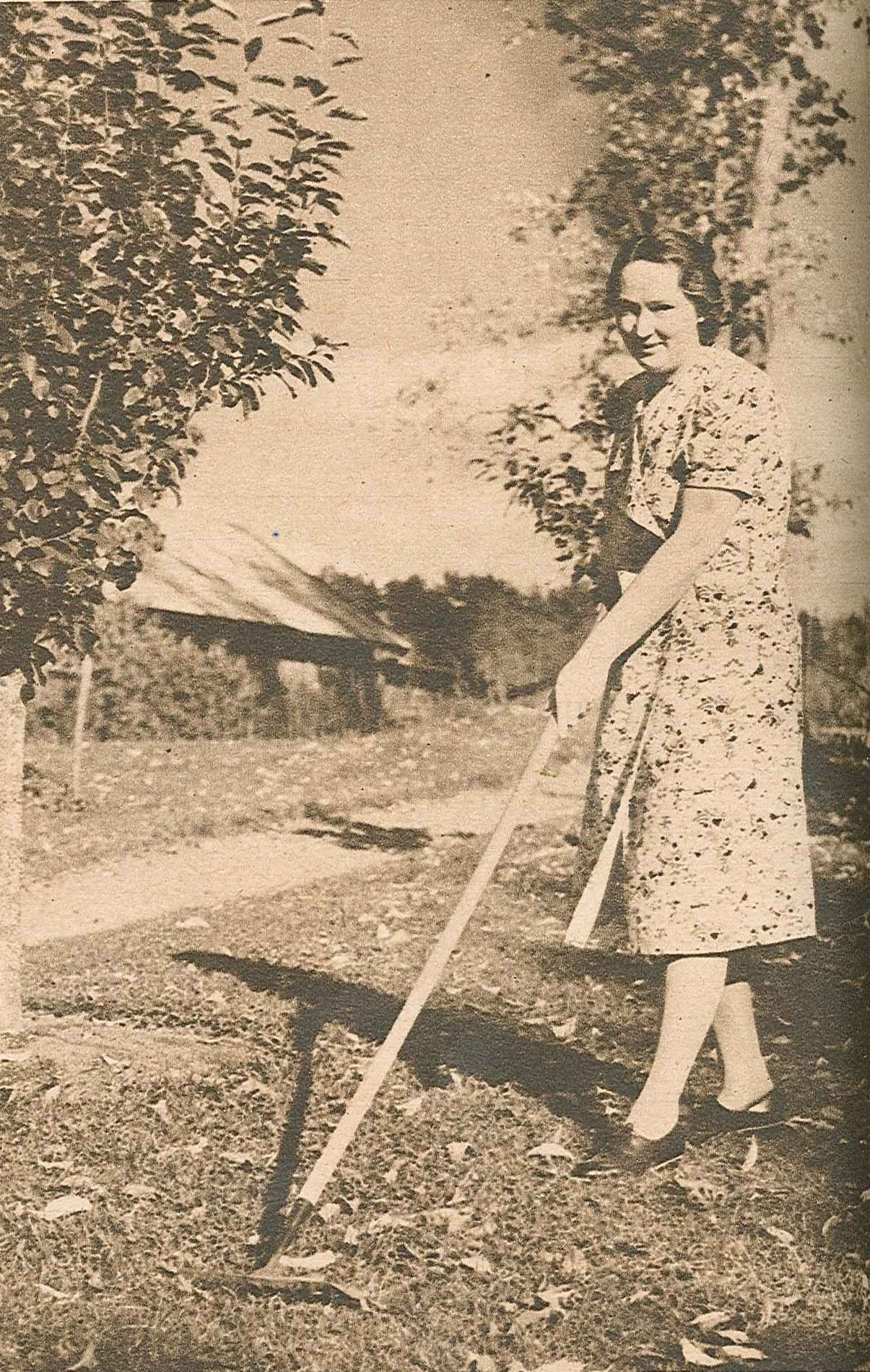
- Irja Browallius in 1943.
- Born: Irja Agnes Browallius; 13 October 1901; Helsinki, Finland
- Died: 9 December 1968 (aged 67); Lidingö, Sweden
- Writing career
- Language: Swedish
- Notable awards: Dobloug Prize; 1962

Irja Agnes Browallius (13 October 1901 – 9 December 1968) was a Swedish teacher, novelist and short story writer. She was awarded the Dobloug Prize in 1962.

== Personal life ==
Browallius was born in Helsinki on 13 October 1901, a daughter of actors Carl Browallius and Gerda Pisani. She moved to Sweden shortly after her birth. She died in Lidingö on 9 December 1968.
