= Lotus 25 =

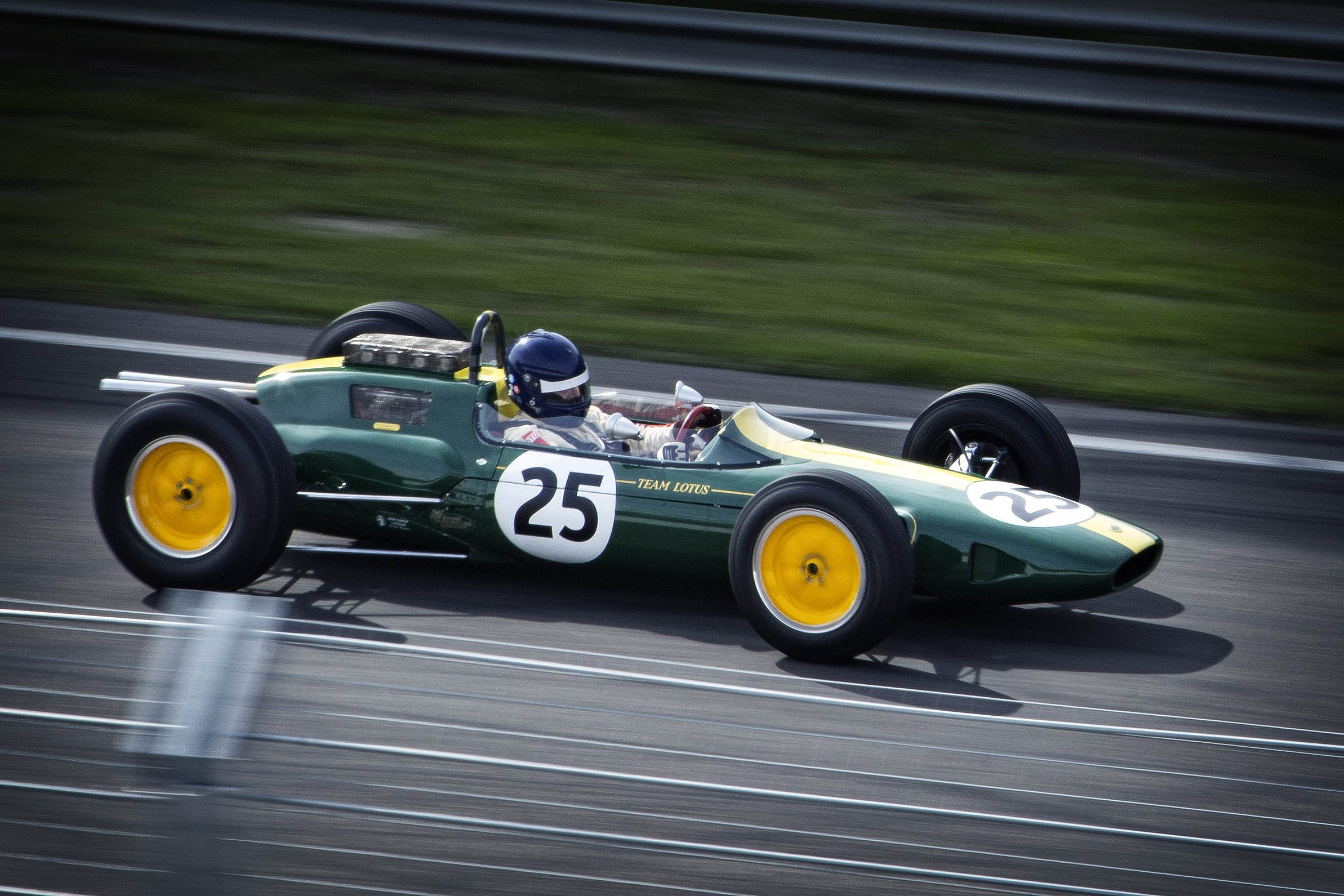
- Category: Formula One
- Constructor: Team Lotus
- Designer: Colin Chapman
- Predecessor: Lotus 21 / Lotus 24
- Successor: Lotus 33

Technical specifications
- Chassis: Aluminium monocoque
- Suspension (front): Double wishbone, with inboard coilover spring/damper units.
- Suspension (rear): Lower wishbone, top link and radius rod suspension, with outboard coilover spring/damper units.
- Engine: Coventry Climax FWMV, 1496cc, 90° V8; Naturally aspirated, mid-mounted BRM P56, 1498 cc, 90° V8; Naturally aspirated, mid-mounted
- Transmission: ZF 5DS10 5-speed manual
- Tyres: Dunlop

Competition history
- Notable entrants: Team Lotus; Reg Parnell Racing; Brabham Racing Organisation
- Notable drivers: (United Kingdom) Jim Clark (United Kingdom) Trevor Taylor (United Kingdom) Mike Spence (New Zealand) Chris Amon (United Kingdom) Mike Hailwood (United Kingdom) Richard Attwood
- Debut: 1962 Dutch Grand Prix
Races	Wins	Podiums	Poles	F/Laps
49	14	18	14	18
- Constructors' Championships: 2 (1963, 1965)
- Drivers' Championships: 2 (1963, 1965)
- Unless otherwise stated, all data refer to Formula One World Championship Grands Prix only.

The Lotus 25 was a racing car designed by Colin Chapman for the 1962 Formula One season. It was a revolutionary design, the first fully stressed monocoque chassis to appear in Formula One. In the hands of Jim Clark it took 14 World Championship Grand Prix wins and propelled him to his 1963 World Championship title. Its last World Championship win was at the 1965 French Grand Prix.

It was the first Formula One car to use Esso fuel.

== History ==
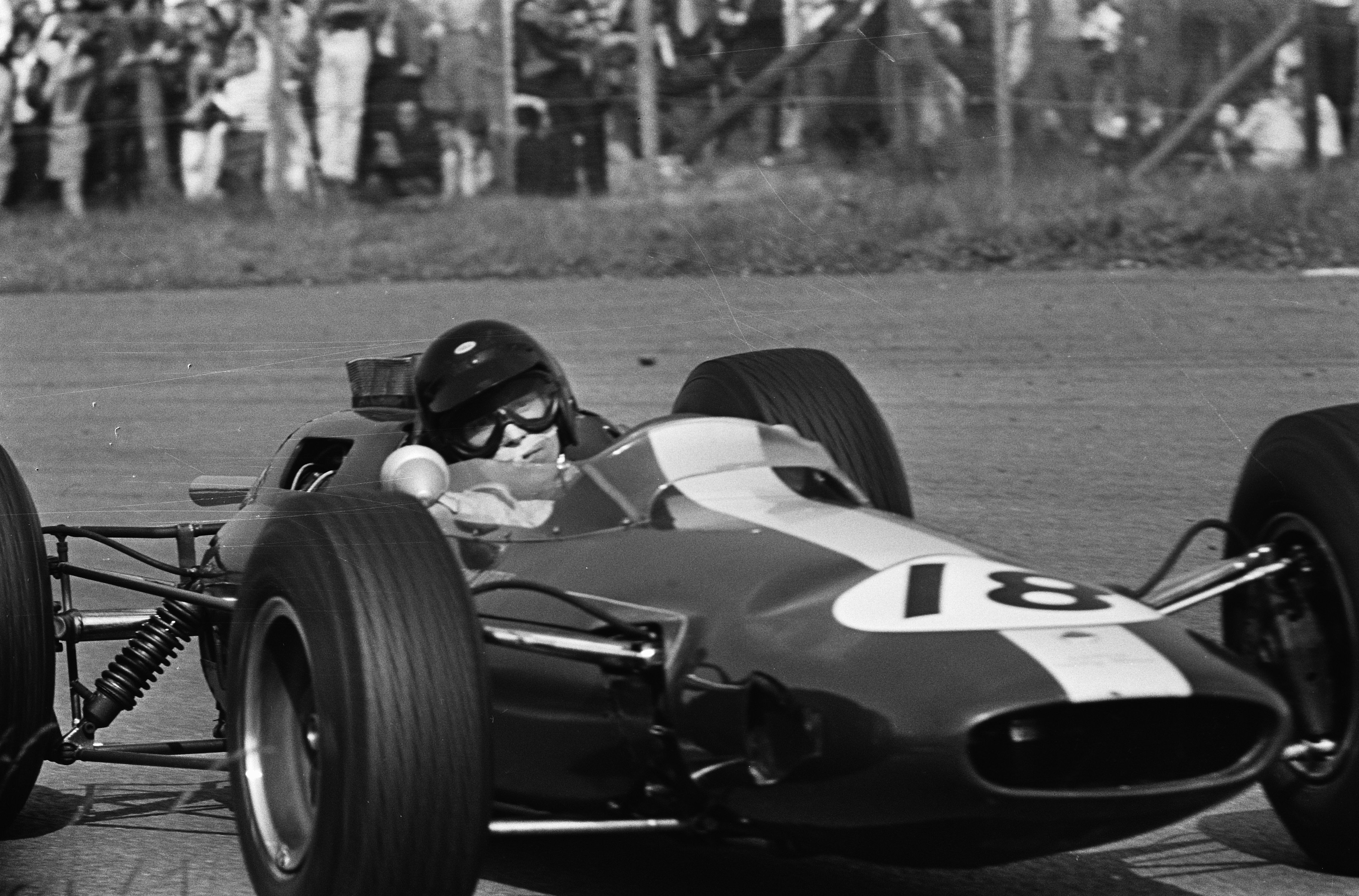
Jim Clark at the 1964 Dutch Grand Prix.

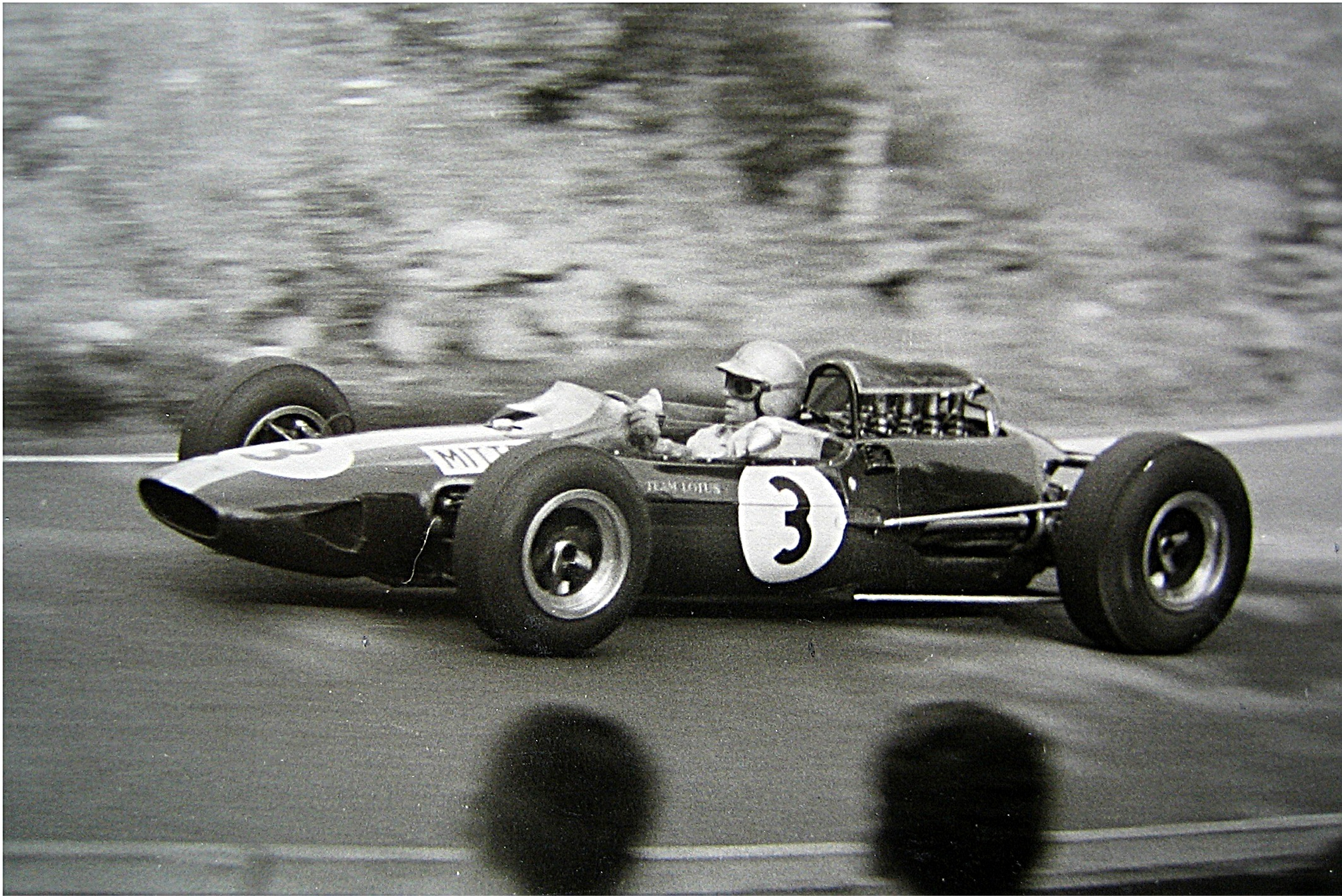
Gerhard Mitter at the 1965 German Grand Prix.

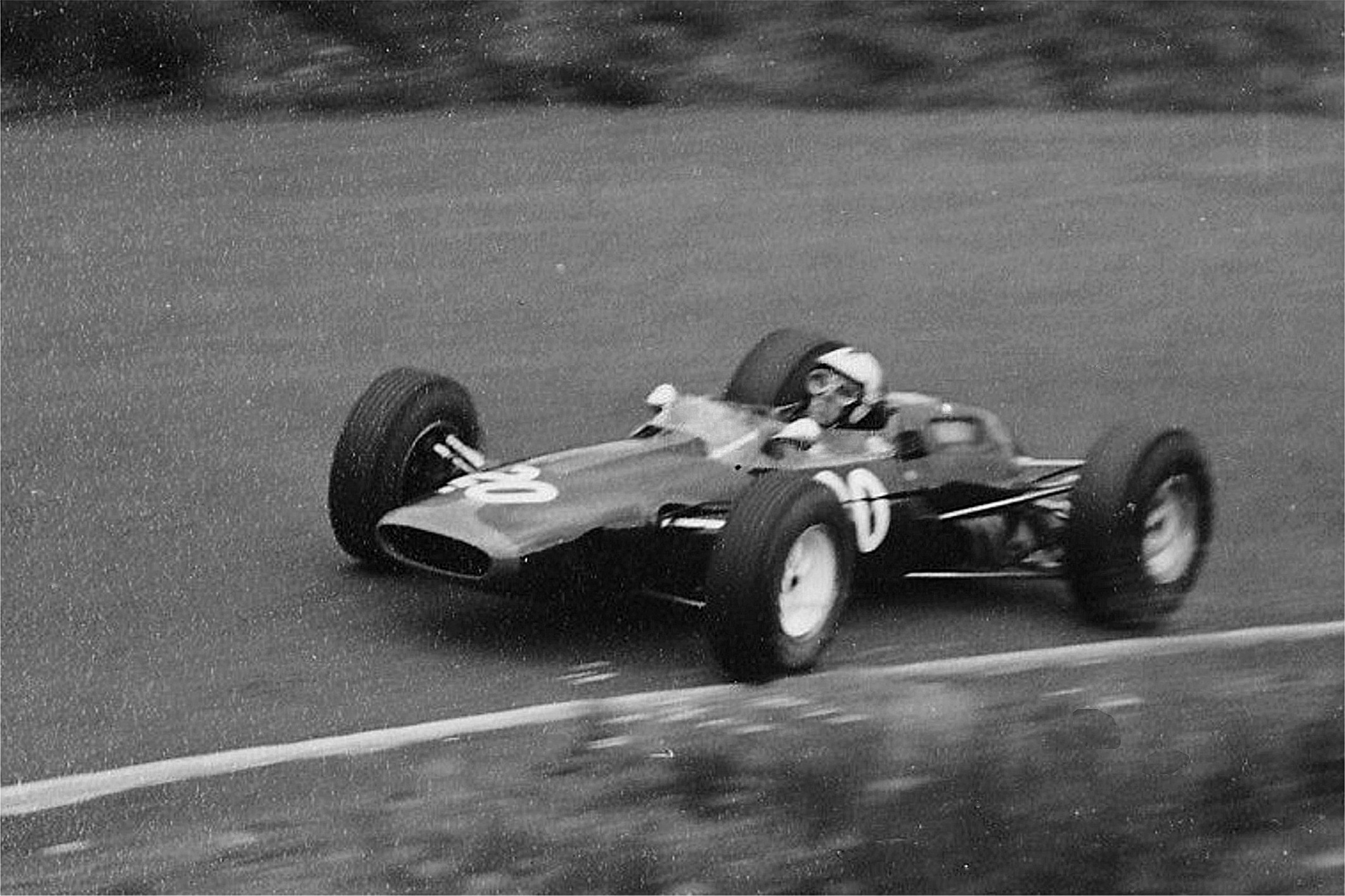
Richard Attwood in Reg Parnell Racing privately entered Lotus 25 at the 1965 German Grand Prix.

An early brainchild of Chapman's fertile mind, the original sketches for the car were made on napkins while Chapman discussed his idea while dining out with Frank Costin (designer of Vanwall, Lotus Mk.8, 9, 10, 11 and Lotus 16 bodies, later of Marcos fame). The unveiling of the 25 at Zandvoort in 1962 was a shock for the competition, and particularly for teams like Brabham and UDT/Laystall who had recently purchased 24s from Lotus, with the understanding that they would be "mechanically identical" to the works cars - Chapman reserved the right to alter the bodywork of the cars.

The monocoque made the car more rigid and structurally stronger than typical F1 cars of the period. The 25 was three times stiffer than the interim 24, while the chassis weighed only half as much. The car also was extremely low and narrow, with a frontal area of 8 ft^{2} (0.74 square metres) as compared to the normal 9.5 ft^{2} (0.88 square metres). It was also envisaged to have a column gear lever, to keep the cockpit width to a minimum, although this was only experimental and discarded. To assist the low profile and low frontal area, the driver reclined sharply behind the wheel (an idea seen in the 18, and pioneered over a decade previously by Gustav Baumm at NSU), leading to the nickname 'The Bathtub', while front coil/damper units were moved inboard (as in the 1948 Maserati). (Note: "Chapman was not concerned to be original, merely to be thorough.") The 25 was powered by the Mk.II 1496cc through to the Mk.5 1499cc versions of the Coventry Climax FWMV V8 in crossplane and flatplane formats. Later, Reg Parnell Racing in 1964 fitted BRM P56s of similar specification to their second-hand 25s.

Some privateers who had been buying Lotus chassis were disgruntled by the fact Chapman refused to provide them 25s. These teams, including Rob Walker Racing, were given Lotus 24s, while the works team had exclusive use of the 25 for Jim Clark and Trevor Taylor. When it first appeared at the Dutch Grand Prix, the futuristic 25 was inspected by John Cooper, who asked Chapman where he had put the frame tubes in the car.

Seven cars were built in total, numbered R1 to R7. Four cars - R1, R2, R3 and R5 - were written off (three of them by Trevor Taylor) in accidents between 1962 and 1966. The most successful was R4, which Clark drove to all seven of his World Championship wins in 1963. This car was later crashed by Richard Attwood then rebuilt as a Lotus 33 using a spare monocoque of that type and unofficially known as R13.

== Racing history ==
The car gave Clark his first World Championship Grand Prix victory, at Spa in 1962. He took another win in Britain and again in the USA, which put him in contention for the title, but while leading the final race in South Africa a much publicised engine seizure cost him the title to Graham Hill.

Clark gained his revenge the following year, taking his first World Championship in the 25, by winning 7 races, Belgium, France, Holland, Britain, Italy, South Africa, and Mexico. Lotus also won its first constructors' championship. Following the United States GP, a 25 was taken to the Indianapolis Motor Speedway for evaluation, where they also trialled Lucas electronic ignition for Ford. The results were encouraging enough for Colin Chapman to mount his ultimately successful challenge on the Indianapolis 500.

The 25 was again used during the 1964 season, winning a further three races in Clark's hands. At the final race in Mexico, just as in 1962, the Climax engine developed an oil leak and with literally a lap to run Clark coasted to a halt in sight of world championship victory, this time conceding to John Surtees. Despite the introduction of the Lotus 33 in 1964, the 25 was still used until well into the 1965 season, Clark taking the car's final win at the 1965 French Grand Prix.

In 1964, Reg Parnell Racing began racing the 25, using the BRM P56 V8 engine, with limited success. Chris Irwin placed Reg Parnell Racing's 25/33 hybrid 7th in its final World Championship race at the 1967 Dutch Grand Prix, scene of the model's debut five years earlier.

=== World Championship results ===
(key) (results in bold indicate pole position; results in italics indicate fastest lap)

Year	Entrant	Engine	Driver	1	2	3	4	5	6	7	8	9	10	11	Points^{1}	WCC
1962	Team Lotus	Climax FWMV 1.5 V8		NED	MON	BEL	FRA	GBR	GER	ITA	USA	RSA			**36 (38)**	**2nd**
1962	Team Lotus	Climax FWMV 1.5 V8	Jim Clark	9	**Ret**	1	**Ret**	**1**	4	**Ret**	**1**	**Ret**			**36 (38)**	**2nd**
1962	Team Lotus	Climax FWMV 1.5 V8	Trevor Taylor				8			Ret	12	Ret			**36 (38)**	**2nd**
1963	Team Lotus	Climax FWMV 1.5 V8		MON	BEL	NED	FRA	GBR	GER	ITA	USA	MEX	RSA		**54 (74)**	**1st**
1963	Team Lotus	Climax FWMV 1.5 V8	Jim Clark	**8**	1	**1**	**1**	**1**	**2**	1	3	**1**	**1**		**54 (74)**	**1st**
1963	Team Lotus	Climax FWMV 1.5 V8	Trevor Taylor	6	Ret	10	13	Ret	8		Ret	Ret	8		**54 (74)**	**1st**
1963	Team Lotus	Climax FWMV 1.5 V8	Peter Arundell				DNS^{3}								**54 (74)**	**1st**
1963	Team Lotus	Climax FWMV 1.5 V8	Mike Spence							13					**54 (74)**	**1st**
1963	Team Lotus	Climax FWMV 1.5 V8	Pedro Rodríguez								Ret	Ret			**54 (74)**	**1st**
1963	Brabham Racing Organisation^{2}	Climax FWMV 1.5 V8	Jack Brabham	9											**54 (74)**	**1st**
1964	Team Lotus	Climax FWMV 1.5 V8		MON	NED	BEL	FRA	GBR	GER	AUT	ITA	USA	MEX		**37 (40)**	**3rd**
1964	Team Lotus	Climax FWMV 1.5 V8	Jim Clark	**4**	1	1	**Ret**	**1**			Ret	**Ret**^{4}			**37 (40)**	**3rd**
1964	Team Lotus	Climax FWMV 1.5 V8	Peter Arundell	3	3	9	4								**37 (40)**	**3rd**
1964	Team Lotus	Climax FWMV 1.5 V8	Mike Spence					9					4		**37 (40)**	**3rd**
1964	Team Lotus	Climax FWMV 1.5 V8	Gerhard Mitter						9						**37 (40)**	**3rd**
1964	Reg Parnell Racing	Climax FWMV 1.5 V8	Chris Amon							Ret					**37 (40)**	**3rd**
1964	Reg Parnell Racing	BRM P56 1.5 V8	Chris Amon	DNQ	5	Ret	10	Ret	11			Ret	Ret		3	8th
1964	Reg Parnell Racing	BRM P56 1.5 V8	Mike Hailwood	6	12		8	Ret	Ret	8	Ret	8	Ret		3	8th
1964	Reg Parnell Racing	BRM P56 1.5 V8	Peter Revson				DNS^{5}								3	8th
1965	Team Lotus	Climax FWMV 1.5 V8		RSA	MON	BEL	FRA	GBR	NED	GER	ITA	USA	MEX		**54 (58)**^{6}	**1st**
1965	Team Lotus	Climax FWMV 1.5 V8	Jim Clark				**1**								**54 (58)**^{6}	**1st**
1965	Team Lotus	Climax FWMV 1.5 V8	Mike Spence						8						**54 (58)**^{6}	**1st**
1965	Team Lotus	Climax FWMV 1.5 V8	Gerhard Mitter							Ret					**54 (58)**^{6}	**1st**
1965	Team Lotus	Climax FWMV 1.5 V8	Giacomo Russo								Ret				**54 (58)**^{6}	**1st**
1965	Team Lotus	Climax FWMV 1.5 V8	Moises Solana									12	Ret		**54 (58)**^{6}	**1st**
1965	Reg Parnell Racing	BRM P56 1.5 V8	Tony Maggs	11											2	8th
1965	Reg Parnell Racing	BRM P56 1.5 V8	Richard Attwood		Ret	14		13	12	Ret	6	10	6		2	8th
1965	Reg Parnell Racing	BRM P56 1.5 V8	Mike Hailwood		Ret										2	8th
1965	Reg Parnell Racing	BRM P56 1.5 V8	Innes Ireland			13	Ret	Ret	10						2	8th
1965	Reg Parnell Racing	BRM P56 1.5 V8	Chris Amon				Ret			Ret					2	8th
1966	Phil Hill	Climax FWMV 1.5 V8		MON	BEL	FRA	GBR	NED	GER	ITA	USA	MEX			8^{7}	6th
1966	Phil Hill	Climax FWMV 1.5 V8	Phil Hill	DNS											8^{7}	6th
1967	Reg Parnell Racing	BRM P60 2.1 V8		RSA	MON	NED	BEL	FRA	GBR	GER	CAN	ITA	USA	MEX	0	NC
1967	Reg Parnell Racing	BRM P60 2.1 V8	Piers Courage	Ret											0	NC
1967	Reg Parnell Racing	BRM P60 2.1 V8	Chris Irwin			7									0	NC

^{1} Points were awarded on a 9-6-4-3-2-1 basis to the first six finishers at each round, but only the best placed car for each make was eligible to score points. In 1962 and 1966 only the best five results from the season were retained, and only the best six results for 1963, 1964 and 1965. In 1967 the best five results from the first six rounds and the best four results from the last five rounds were retained.
^{2} Jack Brabham raced the spare works Lotus after engine failure forced him to retire his own car.
^{3} Plans for Arundell to race the spare car were abandoned.
^{4} Clark swapped cars with Spence's Lotus 33 during the race following mechanical problems.
^{5} Revson tried out Hailwood's car in practice while the latter was away qualifying for the TT.
^{6} Total points scored by all Lotus-Climax cars, including 45 points scored by drivers of Lotus 33 variants.
^{7} Total points scored by all Lotus-Climax cars, including 8 points scored by drivers of Lotus 33 variants.
