= Brabham BT7 =

Formula One racing car

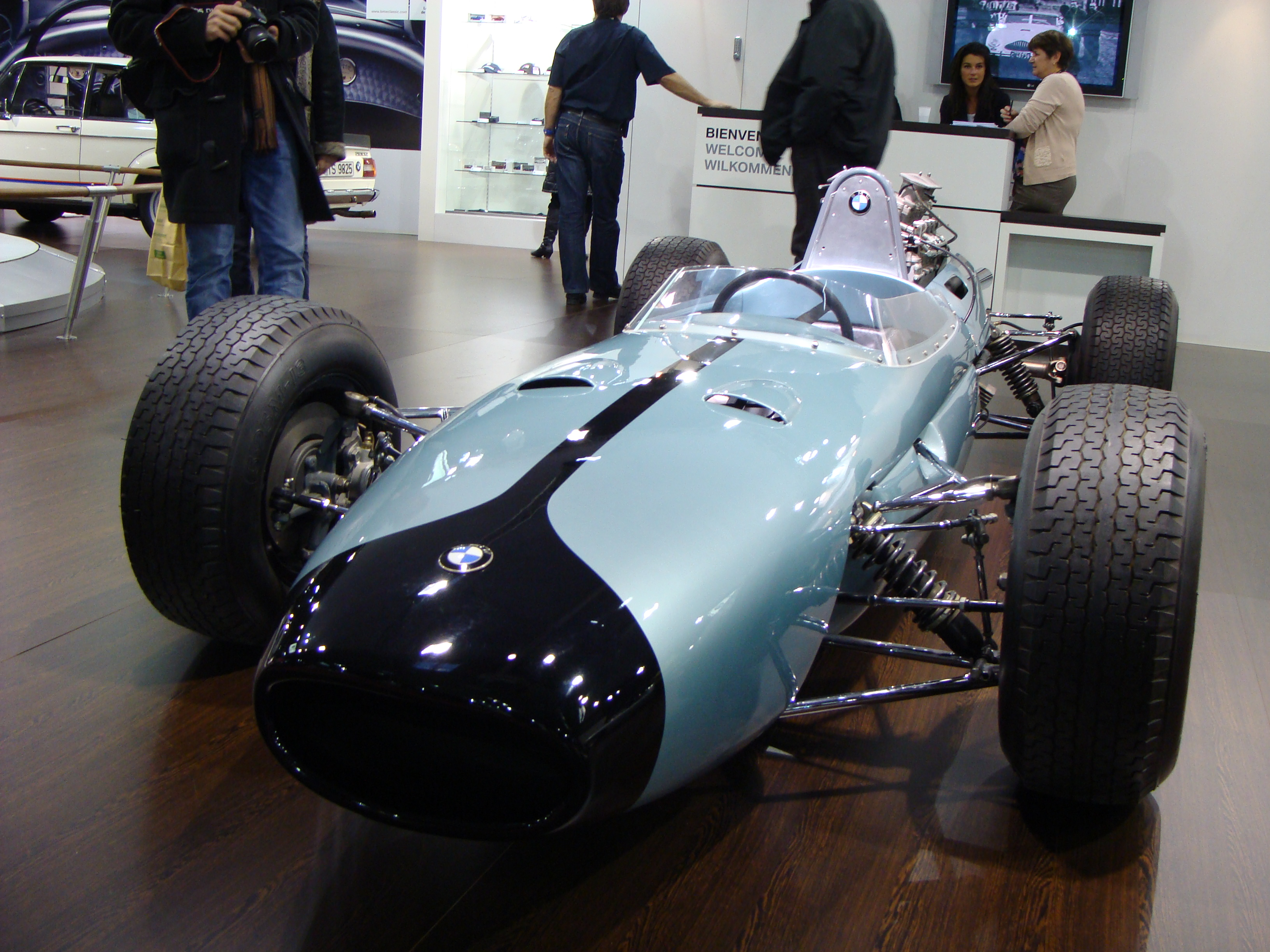
- Category: Formula One
- Constructor: Motor Racing Developments
- Designer: Ron Tauranac
- Predecessor: Brabham BT3
- Successor: Brabham BT11

Technical specifications
- Chassis: Steel spaceframe
- Engine: Coventry Climax V8, naturally aspirated, mid-engine, longitudinally mounted
- Transmission: Hewland, 5 speed manual
- Weight: 475 kg (1,047.2 lb)
- Tyres: Dunlop, Goodyear, Firestone

Competition history
- Notable entrants: Brabham Racing Organisation; Rob Walker Racing Team
- Notable drivers: (Australia) Jack Brabham (United States) Dan Gurney (New Zealand) Denny Hulme (Sweden) Jo Bonnier
- Debut: 1963 Monaco Grand Prix
Races	Wins	Podiums	Poles	F/Laps
31	2	8	2	4
- Constructors' Championships: 0
- Drivers' Championships: 0
- Unless otherwise stated, all data refer to Formula One World Championship Grands Prix only.

The Brabham BT7 (also known as Repco Brabham BT7) is a Formula One racing car. It was raced by the Brabham Racing Organisation and several privateers from 1963 to 1966. A development of its predecessor, the Brabham BT3, the car proved to be competitive during 1963 and 1964, taking Dan Gurney to two victories. Technical issues prevented the BT7 from scoring better results. The car was equipped with a more reliable Hewland gearbox compared to the Colotti-Francis in the BT3. Malcolm Sayer from Jaguar Cars was consulted to give input for the revised chassis. The slick aerodynamics proved particularly strong at high speed circuits such as Monza or Spa. Its successor, the BT11, was a slightly altered BT7 aimed for customers such as Rob Walker or Jo Siffert.

It was in this car that Denny Hulme debuted in Grand Prix racing. He would later win the 1967 World Driver's Championship.

The BT7 was also raced in Formula 2 by Hubert Hahne among others using a 2-litre BMW Neue Klasse engine (pictured).

== Complete Formula One World Championship results ==
(key) (results in bold indicate pole position, results in italics indicate fastest laps)

Year	Team	Tyres	Drivers	1	2	3	4	5	6	7	8	9	10	Points^{1}	WCC
1963	Brabham Racing Organisation	D		MON	BEL	NED	FRA	GBR	GER	ITA	USA	MEX	RSA	**28 (30)**^{2}	3rd
1963	Brabham Racing Organisation	D	Jack Brabham			Ret	4	Ret	7		4	2	13	**28 (30)**^{2}	3rd
1963	Brabham Racing Organisation	D	Dan Gurney	Ret	3	2	5	Ret	Ret	14	Ret	6	2	**28 (30)**^{2}	3rd
1964	Brabham Racing Organisation	D		MON	NED	BEL	FRA	GBR	GER	AUT	ITA	USA	MEX	**30**^{3}	4th
1964	Brabham Racing Organisation	D	Jack Brabham	Ret	Ret	3	3	4	12					**30**^{3}	4th
1964	Brabham Racing Organisation	D	Dan Gurney	Ret	**Ret**	**6**	1	13	10	Ret	10	Ret	1	**30**^{3}	4th
1964	RRC Walker Racing Team	D	Jo Bonnier								12	Ret	Ret	**30**^{3}	4th
1965	Brabham Racing Organisation	G		RSA	MON	BEL	FRA	GBR	NED	GER	ITA	USA	MEX	**27**^{4}	3rd
1965	Brabham Racing Organisation	G	Denny Hulme		8			Ret		Ret				**27**^{4}	3rd
1965	Brabham Racing Organisation	G	Giancarlo Baghetti								Ret			**27**^{4}	3rd
1965	RRC Walker Racing Team	D	Jo Bonnier	Ret	7	Ret	Ret	7	Ret	7	7	8	Ret	**27**^{4}	3rd
1966	Joakim Bonnier Racing Team	F		MON	BEL	FRA	GBR	NED	GER	ITA	USA	MEX		**0**	NC
1966	Joakim Bonnier Racing Team	F	Jo Bonnier				Ret							**0**	NC

^{1} Points were awarded on a 9–6–4–3–2–1 basis for the first six positions at each round with only the best six (1963-1965) or five (1966) round results retained. Only the best placed car from each manufacturer at each round was eligible to score points. Numbers in parentheses are total points scored; numbers not in parentheses are points counted towards the championship
^{2} In 1963, the 28 points counting towards the championship were scored using the BT7; the two dropped points were scored using a BT3
^{3} In 1964, 25 points were scored using the BT7; the remaining 5 points were scored using a BT11
^{4} In 1965, all points were scored using a BT11
