= 1964 Formula One season =

18th season of FIA Formula One motor racing

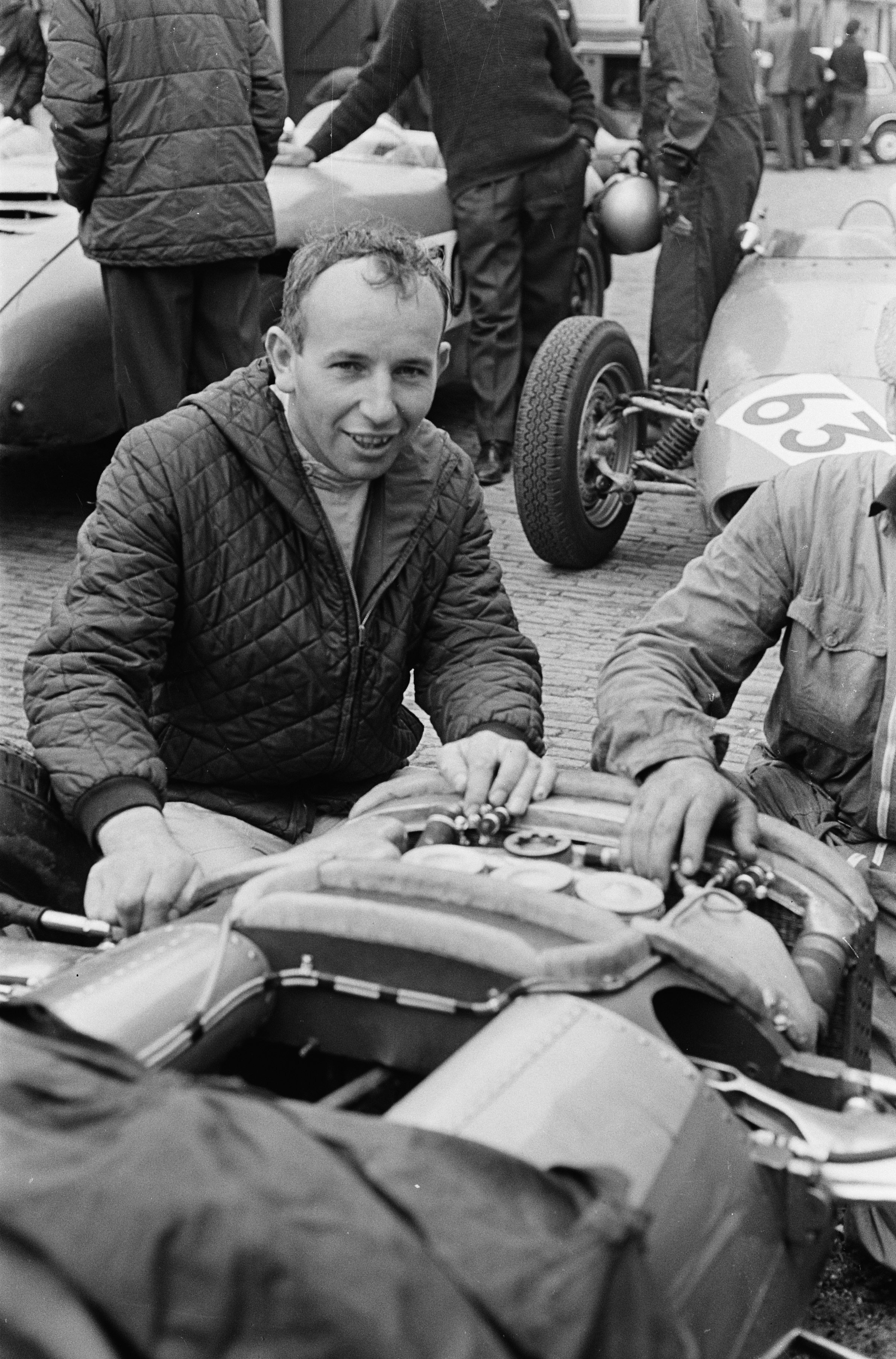
John Surtees (pictured during the 1964 Dutch Grand Prix) won the World Drivers' Championship for his first and only time.

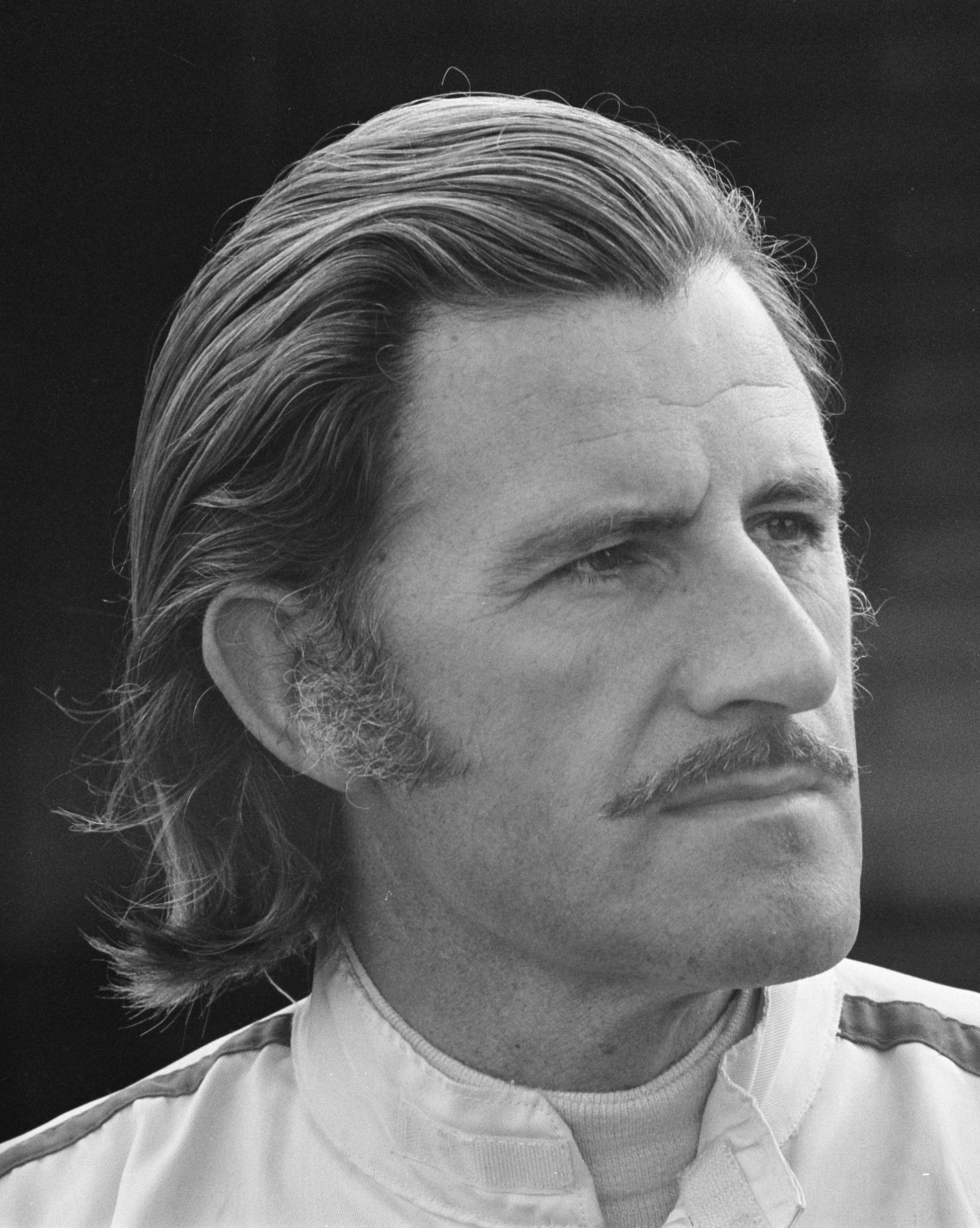
Then 1962 Champion Graham Hill finished as runner-up in the World Drivers' Championship for the second season in a row.

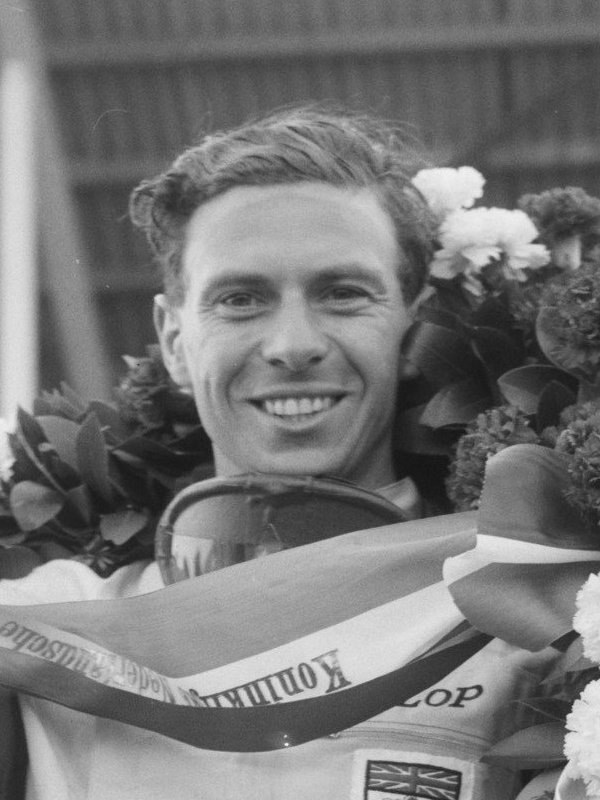
Defending champion Jim Clark finished third in the World Drivers' Championship.

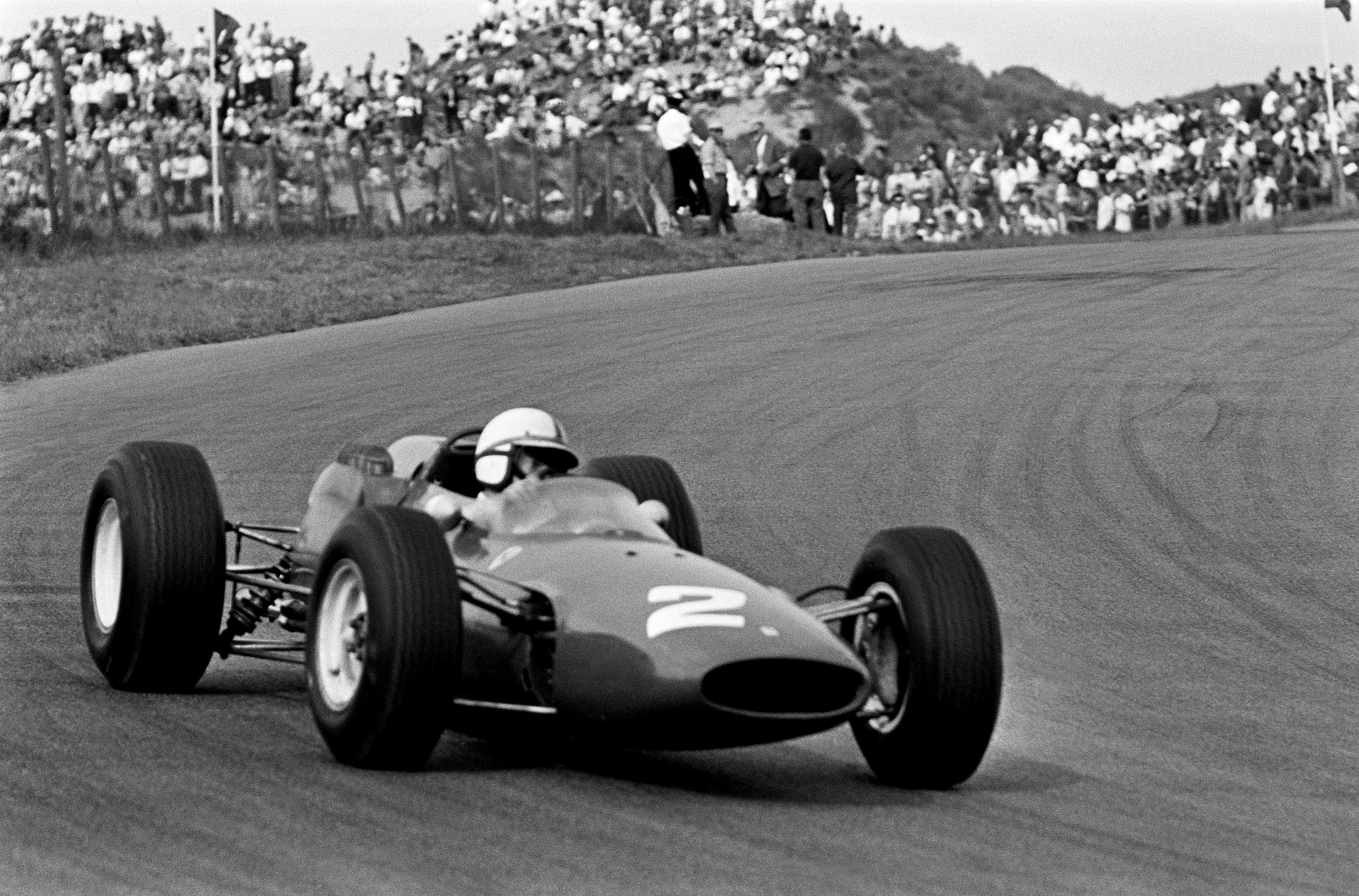
Ferrari won the International Cup for F1 Manufacturers with the Ferrari 156, 158 & 1512.

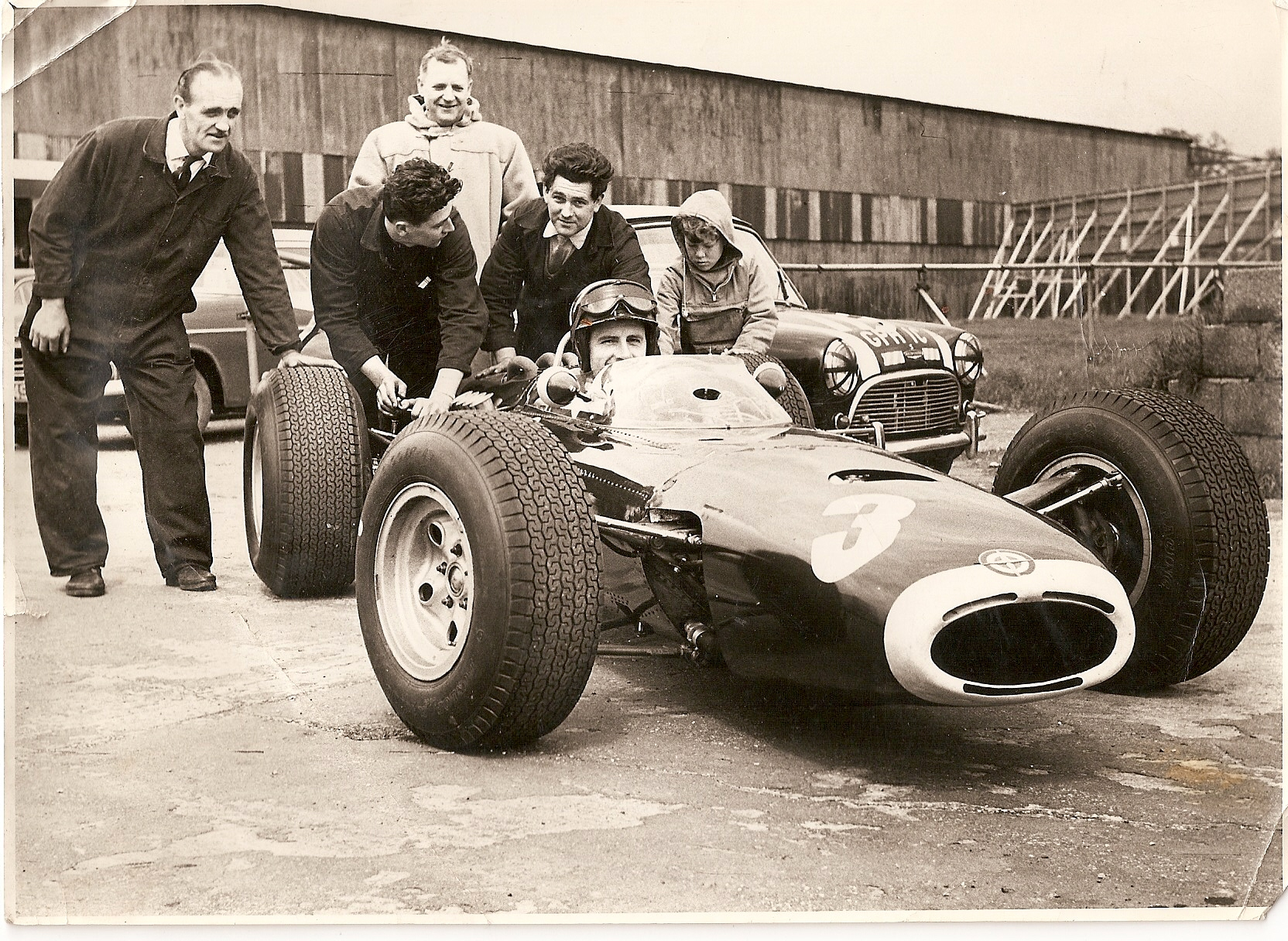
BRM finished second in the International Cup for F1 Manufacturers with the BRM P261 and P67.

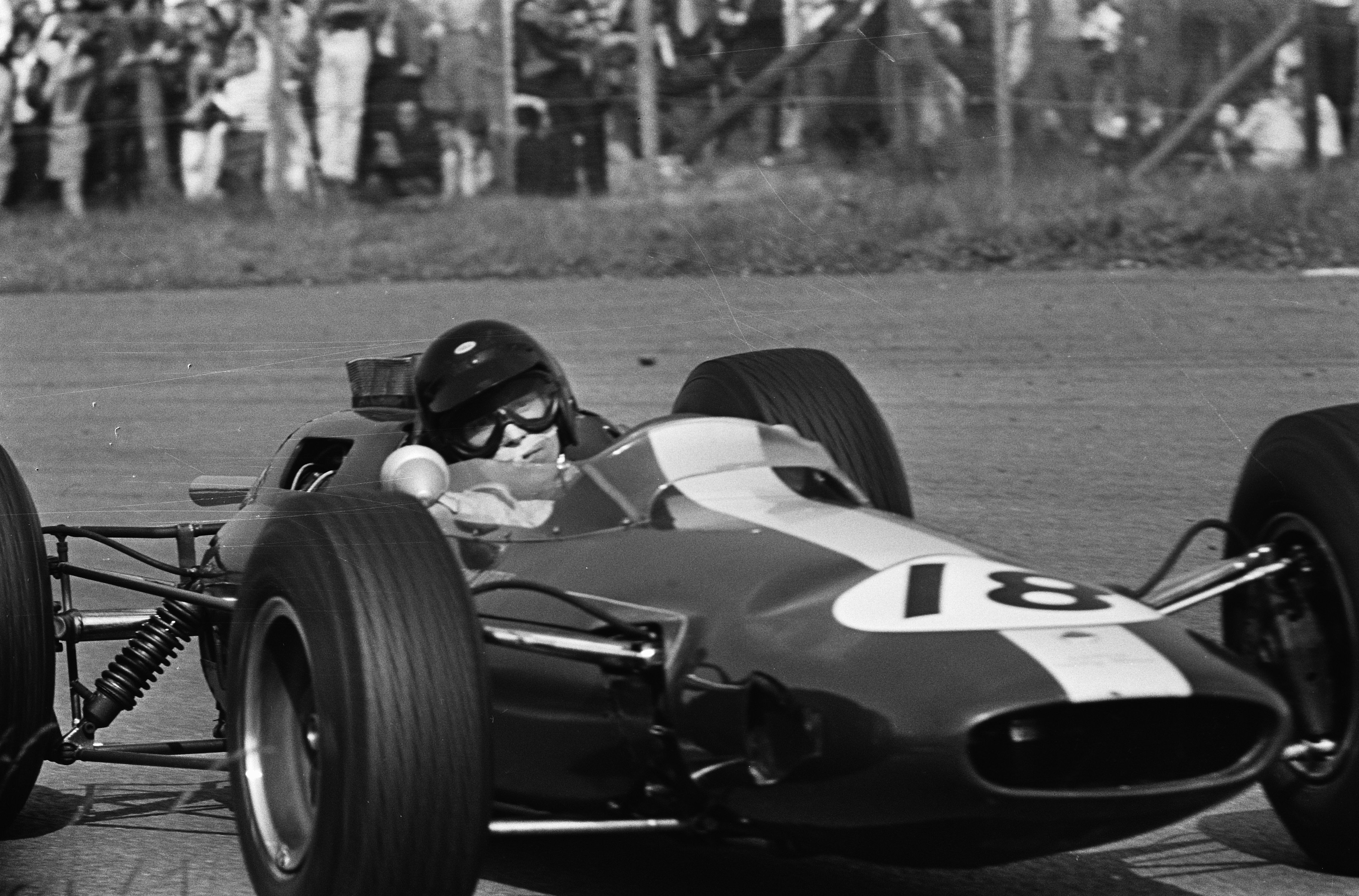
Lotus finished third in the International Cup for F1 Manufacturers with the Lotus 25 & 33.

The 1964 Formula One season was the 18th season of FIA Formula One motor racing. It featured the 15th World Championship of Drivers, the 7th International Cup for F1 Manufacturers, and eight non-championship races open to Formula One cars. The World Championship was contested over ten races between 10 May and 25 October 1964.

John Surtees won the Drivers' Championship with Scuderia Ferrari. It was his first and only title. Ferrari were also awarded the International Cup for F1 Manufacturers. It was their second title and the last until 1975.

Maurice Trintignant retired at the age of 46 after 15 seasons in F1. He was the last driver to have competed in the first World Championship season in 1950.

Dutch driver Carel Godin de Beaufort crashed during practice for the German Grand Prix and succumbed to his injuries the following day in hospital.

== Teams and drivers ==
The following teams and drivers competed in the 1964 FIA World Championship.

Entrant	Constructor	Chassis	Engine	Tyre	Driver	Rounds
(United States) Revson Racing	Lotus-BRM	24	BRM P56 1.5 V8	D	(United States) Peter Revson	1, 6, 8
(France) Bernard Collomb	Lotus-Climax	24	Climax FWMV 1.5 V8	D	(France) Bernard Collomb	1
(France) Maurice Trintignant	BRM	P57	BRM P56 1.5 V8	D	(France) Maurice Trintignant	1, 4–6, 8
(United Kingdom) Brabham Racing Organisation	Brabham-Climax	BT7; BT11	Climax FWMV 1.5 V8	D	(Australia) Jack Brabham	All
(United Kingdom) Brabham Racing Organisation	Brabham-Climax	BT7; BT11	Climax FWMV 1.5 V8	D	(United States) Dan Gurney	All
(United Kingdom) Owen Racing Organisation	BRM	P261; P67	BRM P56 1.5 V8	D	(United States) Richie Ginther	All
(United Kingdom) Owen Racing Organisation	BRM	P261; P67	BRM P56 1.5 V8	D	(United Kingdom) Graham Hill	All
(United Kingdom) Owen Racing Organisation	BRM	P261; P67	BRM P56 1.5 V8	D	(United Kingdom) Richard Attwood	5
(United Kingdom) Cooper Car Company	Cooper-Climax	T73; T66	Climax FWMV 1.5 V8	D	(United States) Phil Hill	1–7, 9–10
(United Kingdom) Cooper Car Company	Cooper-Climax	T73; T66	Climax FWMV 1.5 V8	D	(New Zealand) Bruce McLaren	All
(United Kingdom) Cooper Car Company	Cooper-Climax	T73; T66	Climax FWMV 1.5 V8	D	(Rhodesia) John Love	8
(United Kingdom) Team Lotus	Lotus-Climax	25; 33	Climax FWMV 1.5 V8	D	(United Kingdom) Peter Arundell	1–4
(United Kingdom) Team Lotus	Lotus-Climax	25; 33	Climax FWMV 1.5 V8	D	(United Kingdom) Jim Clark	All
(United Kingdom) Team Lotus	Lotus-Climax	25; 33	Climax FWMV 1.5 V8	D	(United Kingdom) Mike Spence	5–10
(United Kingdom) Team Lotus	Lotus-Climax	25; 33	Climax FWMV 1.5 V8	D	(West Germany) Gerhard Mitter	6
(United Kingdom) Team Lotus	Lotus-Climax	25; 33	Climax FWMV 1.5 V8	D	(United States) Walt Hansgen	9
(United Kingdom) Team Lotus	Lotus-Climax	25; 33	Climax FWMV 1.5 V8	D	(Mexico) Moisés Solana	10
(United Kingdom) British Racing Partnership	Lotus-BRM	24	BRM P56 1.5 V8	D	(United Kingdom) Innes Ireland	1
(United Kingdom) British Racing Partnership	Lotus-BRM	24	BRM P56 1.5 V8	D	(United Kingdom) Trevor Taylor	5
(United Kingdom) British Racing Partnership	BRP-BRM	Mk 1 Mk 2	BRM P56 1.5 V8	D	(United Kingdom) Innes Ireland	3–5, 7–10
(United Kingdom) British Racing Partnership	BRP-BRM	Mk 1 Mk 2	BRM P56 1.5 V8	D	(United Kingdom) Trevor Taylor	1, 3–4, 7–10
(United Kingdom) DW Racing Enterprises	Brabham-Climax	BT11	Climax FWMV 1.5 V8	D	(United Kingdom) Bob Anderson	1–8
(United Kingdom) Reg Parnell Racing	Lotus-Climax	25	Climax FWMV 1.5 V8	D	(New Zealand) Chris Amon	7
(United Kingdom) Reg Parnell Racing	Lotus-BRM	25; 24	BRM P56 1.5 V8	D	(New Zealand) Chris Amon	1–6, 9–10
(United Kingdom) Reg Parnell Racing	Lotus-BRM	25; 24	BRM P56 1.5 V8	D	(United Kingdom) Mike Hailwood	1–2, 4–10
(United Kingdom) Reg Parnell Racing	Lotus-BRM	25; 24	BRM P56 1.5 V8	D	(United States) Peter Revson	3–5
(United Kingdom) R.R.C. Walker Racing Team	Cooper-Climax	T66	Climax FWMV 1.5 V8	D	(West Germany) Edgar Barth	6
(United Kingdom) R.R.C. Walker Racing Team	Cooper-Climax	T66	Climax FWMV 1.5 V8	D	(Sweden) Jo Bonnier	1
(United Kingdom) R.R.C. Walker Racing Team	Brabham-Climax	BT7	Climax FWMV 1.5 V8	D	(Sweden) Jo Bonnier	7–10
(United Kingdom) R.R.C. Walker Racing Team	Brabham-BRM	BT11	BRM P56 1.5 V8	D	(Sweden) Jo Bonnier	2–3, 5–6
(United Kingdom) R.R.C. Walker Racing Team	Brabham-BRM	BT11	BRM P56 1.5 V8	D	(Austria) Jochen Rindt	7
(United Kingdom) R.R.C. Walker Racing Team	Brabham-BRM	BT11	BRM P56 1.5 V8	D	(Italy) Geki	8
(United Kingdom) R.R.C. Walker Racing Team	Brabham-BRM	BT11	BRM P56 1.5 V8	D	(Switzerland) Jo Siffert	9–10
(United Kingdom) R.R.C. Walker Racing Team	Brabham-BRM	BT11	BRM P56 1.5 V8	D	(United States) Hap Sharp	9–10
(Italy) Scuderia Ferrari SpA SEFAC (United States) North American Racing Team	Ferrari	156; 158; 1512	Ferrari 178 1.5 V6; Ferrari 205B 1.5 V8; Ferrari 207 1.5 F12	D	(Italy) Lorenzo Bandini	All
(Italy) Scuderia Ferrari SpA SEFAC (United States) North American Racing Team	Ferrari	156; 158; 1512	Ferrari 178 1.5 V6; Ferrari 205B 1.5 V8; Ferrari 207 1.5 F12	D	(United Kingdom) John Surtees	All
(Italy) Scuderia Ferrari SpA SEFAC (United States) North American Racing Team	Ferrari	156; 158; 1512	Ferrari 178 1.5 V6; Ferrari 205B 1.5 V8; Ferrari 207 1.5 F12	D	(Italy) Ludovico Scarfiotti	8
(Italy) Scuderia Ferrari SpA SEFAC (United States) North American Racing Team	Ferrari	156; 158; 1512	Ferrari 178 1.5 V6; Ferrari 205B 1.5 V8; Ferrari 207 1.5 F12	D	(Mexico) Pedro Rodríguez	10
(Switzerland) Siffert Racing Team	Lotus-BRM	24	BRM P56 1.5 V8	D	(Switzerland) Jo Siffert	1
(Switzerland) Siffert Racing Team	Brabham-BRM	BT11	BRM P56 1.5 V8	D	(Switzerland) Jo Siffert	2–8
(Netherlands) Ecurie Maarsbergen	Porsche	718	Porsche 547/3 1.5 F4	D	(Netherlands) Carel Godin de Beaufort	2, 6
(Italy) Scuderia Centro Sud	BRM	P57	BRM P56 1.5 V8	D	(South Africa) Tony Maggs	2–3, 5–7
(Italy) Scuderia Centro Sud	BRM	P57	BRM P56 1.5 V8	D	(Italy) Giancarlo Baghetti	2–3, 5–8
(Belgium) Equipe Scirocco Belge	Scirocco-Climax	SP	Climax FWMV 1.5 V8	D	(Belgium) André Pilette	3, 6
(United Kingdom) Bob Gerard Racing	Cooper-Ford	T71/73	Ford 109E 1.5 L4	D	(United Kingdom) John Taylor	5
(United Kingdom) Ian Raby Racing	Brabham-BRM	BT3	BRM P56 1.5 V8	D	(United Kingdom) Ian Raby	5, 8
(United Kingdom) John Willment Automobiles	Brabham-Ford	BT10	Ford 109E 1.5 L4	D	(Australia) Frank Gardner	5
(Japan) Honda R & D Company	Honda	RA271	Honda RA271E 1.5 V12	D	(United States) Ronnie Bucknum	6, 8–9
(United Kingdom) Derrington-Francis Racing Team	ATS	DF	ATS 100 1.5 V8	G	(Portugal) Mário de Araújo Cabral	8
(Switzerland) Fabre Urbain	Cooper-Climax	T60	Climax FWMV 1.5 V8	D	(Switzerland) Jean-Claude Rudaz	8

=== Team and driver changes ===
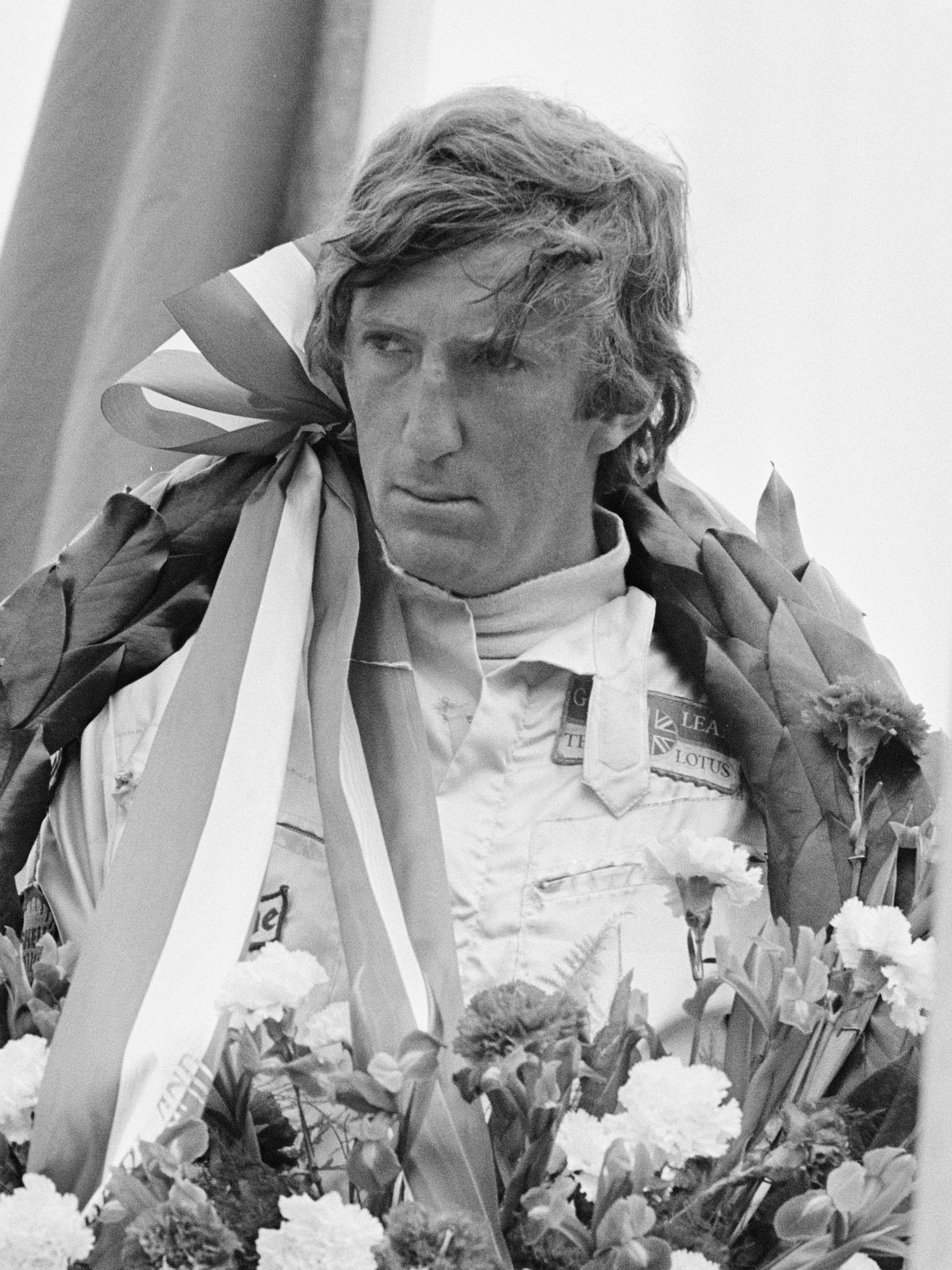
Jochen Rindt debuted this season, driving for Brabham.

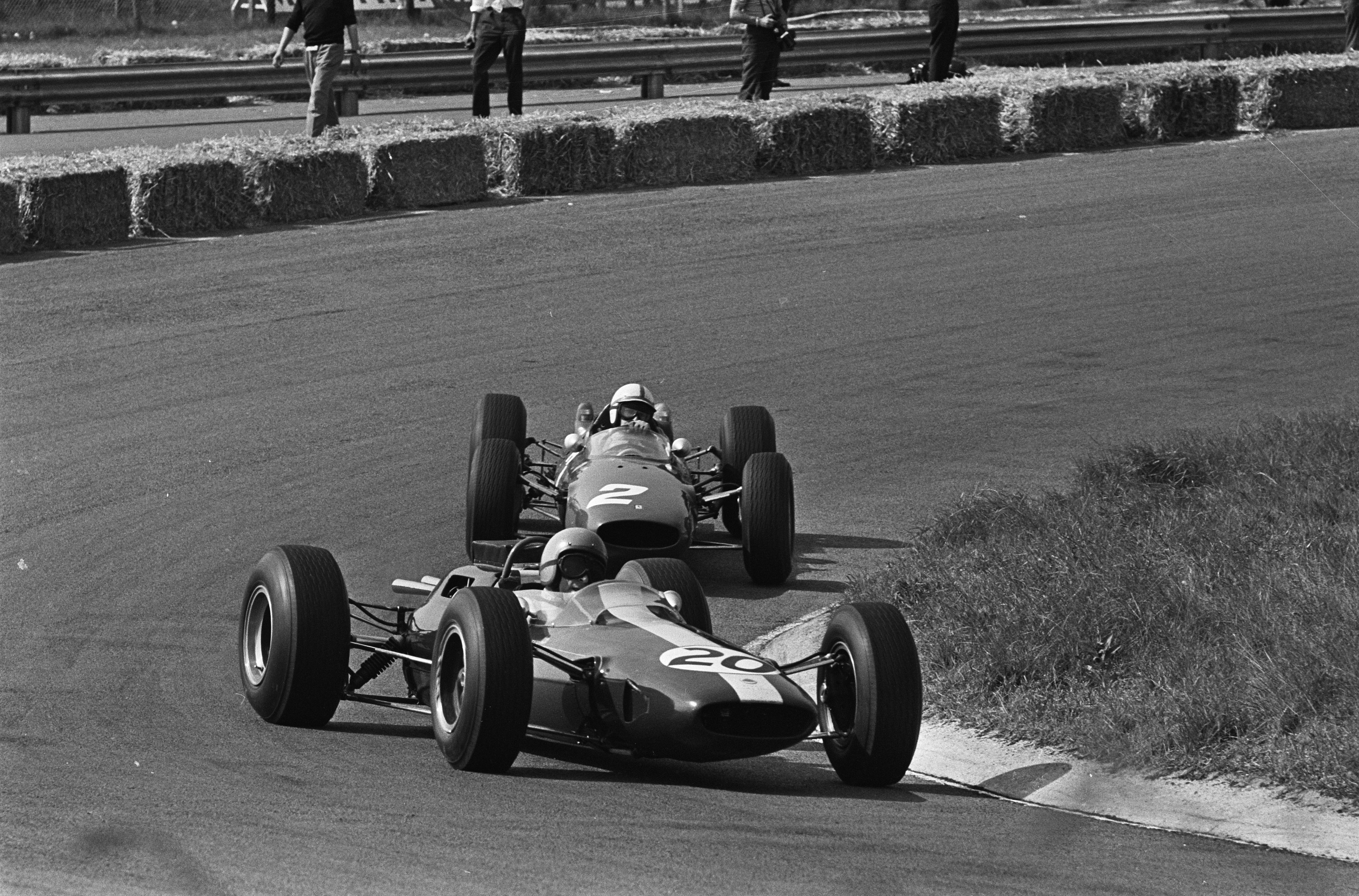
Peter Arundell (pictured leading John Surtees at Zandvoort) was promoted to be the teammate to Jim Clark, but only ran four races, before he was injured and had to be replaced by Mike Spence.

- Trevor Taylor had driven for Team Lotus in 1963 but admitted his confidence was shaken by two serious accidents at Spa-Francorchamps and Enna-Pergusa. Team owner Colin Chapman suggested Taylor take a sabbatical and then return to Lotus. However, Taylor signed with British Racing Partnership for 1964. Lotus promoted their Formula Junior driver Peter Arundell to the F1 team.
- Italian car manufacturer ATS had entered the 1963 season with a self-designed chassis, aiming to compete against Ferrari, but after spending the year battling many technical difficulties, they decided to withdraw from the sport. Their driver, 1961 champion Phil Hill, moved to Cooper, where he replaced Tony Maggs.
- Privateer Reg Parnell Racing switched from using a Lola chassis to second-hand Lotus cars. This marked Lola's exit from the sport until their collaboration with Honda in 1967.

==== Mid-season changes ====
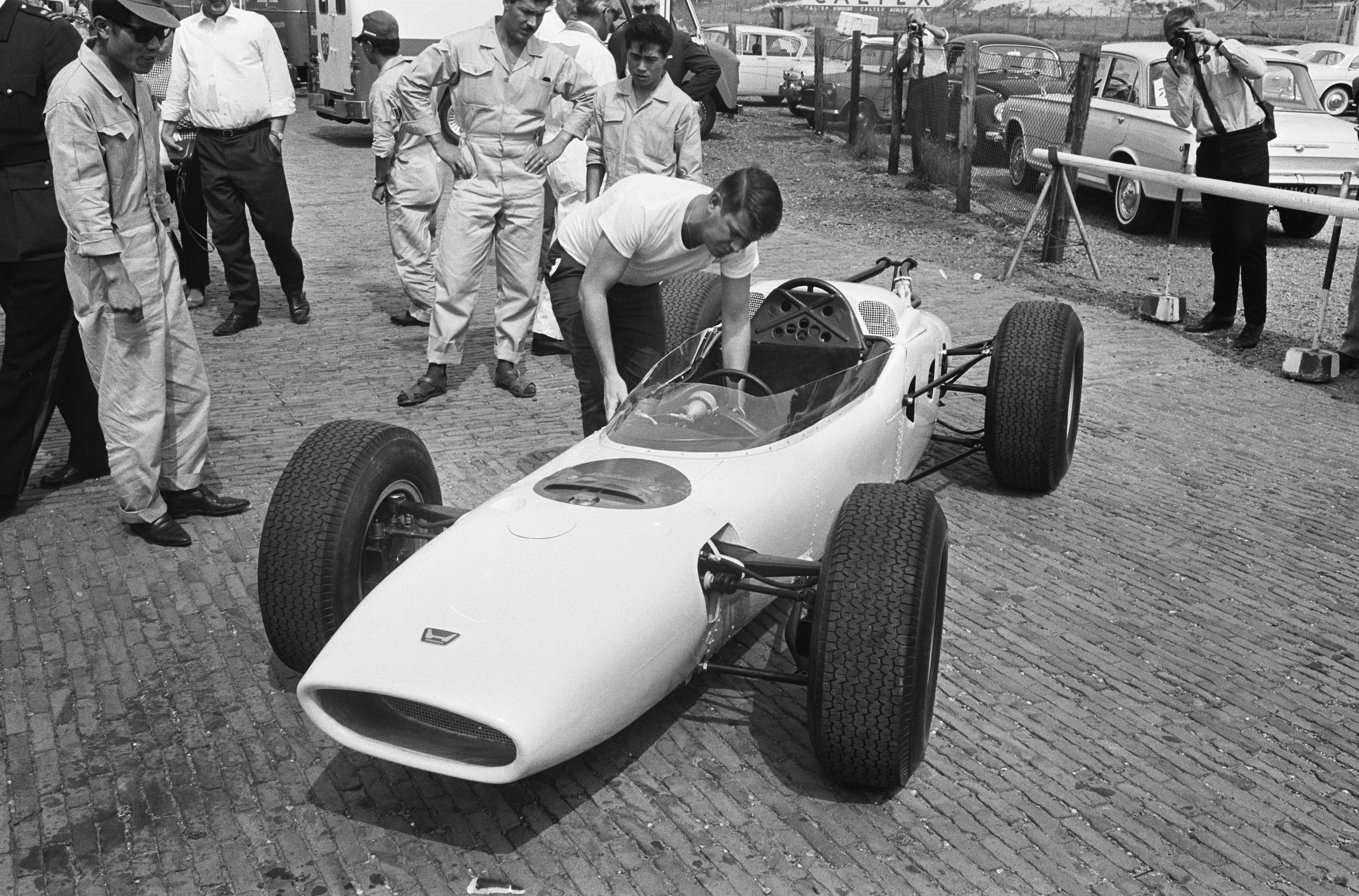
Honda made their F1 debut half-way through the 1964 season.

- Lotus driver Peter Arundell suffered a severe accident in a Formula Two race at Reims-Gueux. Mike Spence was called up to replace him from the British Grand Prix on.
- Carel Godin de Beaufort crashed during practice for the German Grand Prix. He succumbed to his injuries the following day in hospital. Although not a works Porsche driver, he had driven a Porsche 718 in all his races since 1961. His demise marked the disappearance of Porsche's name from F1 until 1983.
- Honda entered the grid half-way through the 1964 season. They had designed their own chassis and engine, something only Ferrari and BRM were doing at the time. Driver Ronnie Bucknum made his F1 debut in the Honda during the 1964 German Grand Prix.

== Calendar ==
Round	Grand Prix	Circuit	Date
1	Monaco Grand Prix	Circuit de Monaco, Monte Carlo	10 May
2	Dutch Grand Prix	(Netherlands) Circuit Park Zandvoort, Zandvoort	24 May
3	Belgian Grand Prix	(Belgium) Circuit de Spa-Francorchamps, Stavelot	14 June
4	French Grand Prix	(France) Rouen-Les-Essarts, Orival	28 June
5	British Grand Prix	(United Kingdom) Brands Hatch, West Kingsdown	11 July
6	German Grand Prix	(West Germany) Nürburgring, Nürburg	2 August
7	Austrian Grand Prix	(Austria) Zeltweg Air Base, Styria	23 August
8	Italian Grand Prix	(Italy) Autodromo Nazionale di Monza, Monza	6 September
9	United States Grand Prix	(United States) Watkins Glen International, New York	4 October
10	Mexican Grand Prix	Magdalena Mixhuca, Mexico City	25 October

=== Calendar changes ===
- The Dutch Grand Prix was moved up four weeks, ahead of the Belgian Grand Prix.
- On 23 August, the Austrian Grand Prix was run in the championship for the first time, after making their debut as a non-championship event in 1963.
- The South African Grand Prix at the Prince George Circuit was scheduled for 26 December but was moved back a week to become the season opener of the 1965 Formula One season.

== Championship report ==
=== Rounds 1 to 4 ===
After a dominant 1963 season with seven wins in ten races, reigning champion Jim Clark was still in form for the first race of 1964, the Monaco Grand Prix. He qualified his Lotus-Climax on pole position, but Jack Brabham (world champion in 1959 and 1960) was just 0.1 seconds behind him in his Brabham-Climax. 1962 champion Graham Hill started in third for BRM and John Surtees fourth for Ferrari. Clark set a blistering pace from the start but went too fast through the harbour chicane and caught some straw bales lining the track. He was lucky to carry on without losing a position. Dan Gurney had started in fifth but overtook Hill and his teammate Brabham on lap 12. Brabham would later retire, as would Surtees. Clark pitted to fix the damage from his first-lap misstep, allowing Gurney and Hill to the front. Just past half-distance, Hill took the lead and Gurney retired with a failing gearbox. Surprisingly, Clark could not match Hill's pace, but it did not matter anyway, since his Lotus developed an oil leak and he retired with four laps to go. Hill took the chequered flag, a lap ahead of his teammate Richie Ginther, awarding BRM a surprise 1-2 finish. Debutant Peter Arundell was third for Lotus, with his team leader being classified fourth to rack up valuable points.

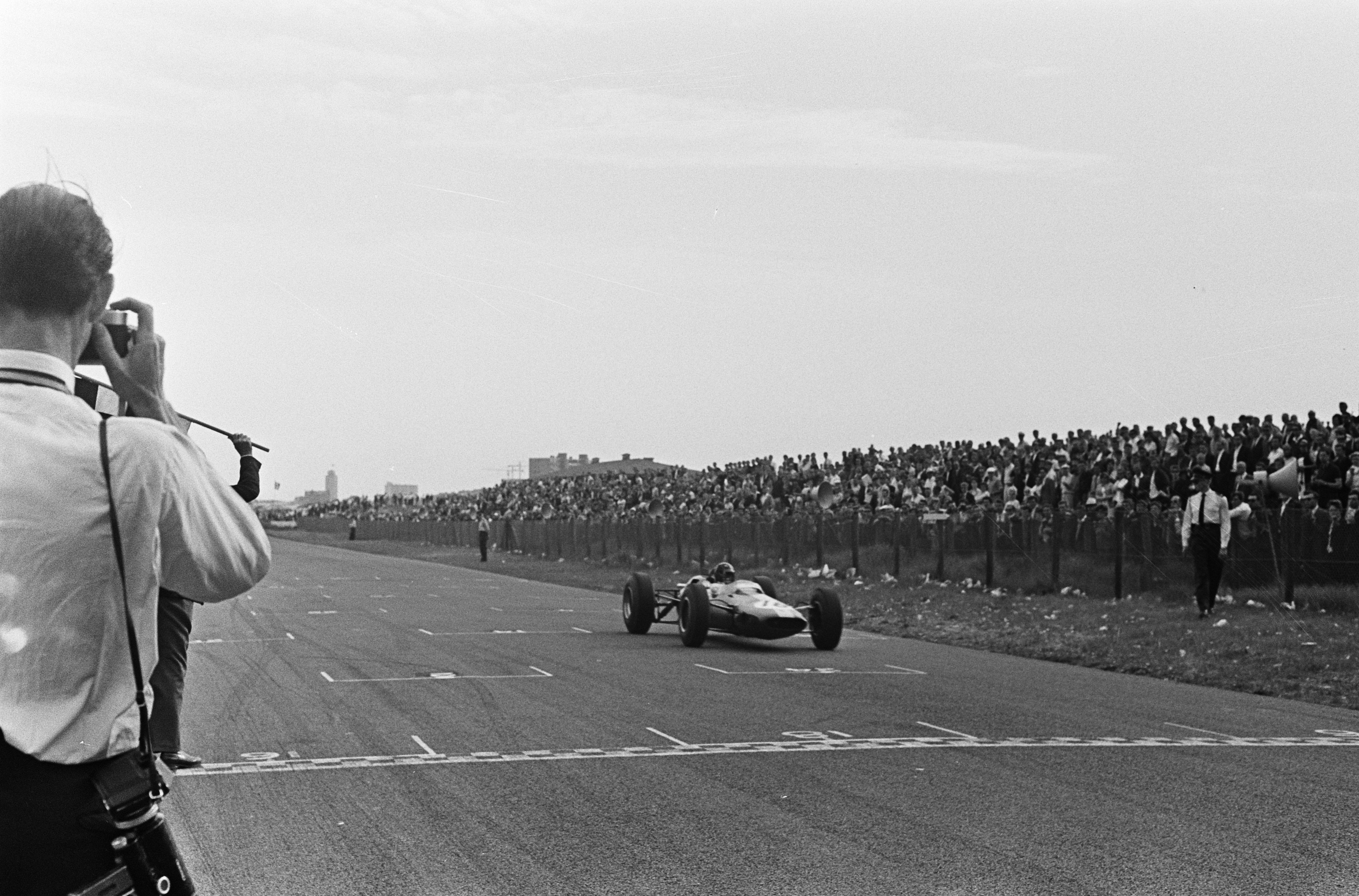
Jim Clark won the Dutch Grand Prix for Lotus.

Dan Gurney started on pole position at the Dutch Grand Prix, with the champions Jim Clark and Graham Hill next to him on the front row. Gurney was the first to brake for Tarzan corner, leaving the other two to fight it out side-by-side. It was Clark who just reached ahead and then never looked back. Gurney retired on lap 22, before Hill's BRM developed a misfire. So the order almost automatically became Clark, Surtees, Arundell, and this remained until the finish.

For the Belgian Grand Prix, it was Gurney again on pole, ahead of Hill and Brabham. On the second row stood Arundell, Surtees and Clark. At the start, it was Arundell who reached Eau Rouge first, but after the first was complete, Gurney, Surtees and Clark were the top three. Surtees briefly advanced to the front before his Ferrari engine failed, leading to a second retirement in three races. Clark was now free to challenge Gurney but had to focus more on keeping Hill behind. They traded places a couple of time, allowing Bruce McLaren to join them in his Cooper. Gurney broke the lap record multiple times, growing his lead to 40 seconds, but unknowingly, was running low on fuel. He slowed down so much that Hill overtook him even before he reached the pits. But then on the last lap, Hill stopped with a failing fuel pump and McLaren's car started spluttering heavily. His engine cut out with less than a kilometer to go, but the track went downhill, so the car was rolling towards the finish line at the bottom when Clark streaked by and narrowly took the victory. McLaren was second, Jack Brabham was third. Clark ran out of fuel during his cool-down lap, so he was brought back to the pits, seated on the engine cover of his teammate's car.

The French Grand Prix saw no surprising names on the front and second rows, although due to the many retirements so far, the fastest drivers did not necessarily feature at the top of the provisional standings. Clark put his Lotus on pole position, ahead of Gurney and Surtees. Clark and Gurney quickly streaked ahead of the rest, while Surtees retired again. Clark set a new lap record and edged away from Gurney, until his engine lost a cylinder. He pitted, was sent out again, but then definitely retired. Gurney took an unchallenged victory, while Hill and Brabham fought over second placed, rubbing tires and flicking up dirt all the while. Hill took second place, Brabham third.

In the Drivers' Championship, Jim Clark (Lotus) stood on 21 points, ahead of Graham Hill (BRM) with 20 and both Richie Ginther (BRM) and Peter Arundell (Lotus) with 11 points. The Manufacturers' Championship saw Lotus on top with 25 points, ahead of BRM (21) and Brabham (14).

=== Rounds 5 to 7 ===
The British Grand Prix was held at Brands Hatch for the first time and received the honorary title of European Grand Prix. Championship leader Jim Clark qualified his Lotus-Climax on pole position, ahead of main rival Graham Hill (BRM) and Dan Gurney (Brabham). Gurney got up to second at the start but had to pit on lap 3 with electrical problems. Hill pressured Clark during the whole race, but the Lotus driver held on to take the win. John Surtees finished third in his Ferrari.

During practice for the German Grand Prix, Dutch driver Carel Godin de Beaufort crashed his famous orange Porsche 718. He was rushed to hospital but would pass away two days later. Honda made their debut but their chassis and engine were marred by reliability problems. The organisers saw the PR value of the new team and scheduled an extra practice session, so that driver Ronnie Bucknum could reach the minimum of 5 laps required to qualify for the race. This gave local hero Gerhard Mitter the chance to do the same. Surtees qualified on pole, ahead of Clark and Gurney, but it was Surtees's teammate Lorenzo Bandini that took the lead at the start. Surtees and Clark went by on the second lap, before Gurney started challenging the pair and snatched the lead away. The Ferrari and Brabham changed places a couple of times, while still lapping faster than Clark and Hill behind them, until Gurney, almost unsurprisingly at this stage, ran into technical issues. His engine was overheating. On lap 7, Clark retired, leaving Surtees to take the win, ahead of Hill and Bandini.

The first Austrian Grand Prix saw Hill score his first pole position, although he was the championship leader at this point. Surtees and Clark started with him on the first row. Hill and Clark bodged the start, which allowed fourth-starting Gurney to come through into the lead. Surtees overtook him on lap 2 but his rear suspension violently collapsed on lap 8. He became one of many victims of the airfield's rough surface: Hill already on lap 5, the Lotuses of Clark and Spence on lap 40, and then Gurney retiring from the lead on lap 47. Ferrari's Lorenzo Bandini took over at the front, ahead of Richie Ginther (BRM) and Jo Bonnier (Brabham). The latter's engine gave up as well near the finish, the Swede still scoring a point in the end but allowing fellow privateer Bob Anderson into third place.

The Drivers' Championship looked set to become a one-on-one fight between the 1962 and 1963 champions: Graham Hill (BRM, 32 points) versus Jim Clark (Lotus, 30 points). John Surtees (Ferrari) was third with 19 points. BRM now also led the Manufacturers' Championship with 36 points, ahead of Lotus (34) and Ferrari (28).

=== Rounds 8 to 10 ===
For the Italian Grand Prix, John Surtees (Ferrari) qualified on pole position, ahead of Dan Gurney (Brabham) and Graham Hill (BRM). Jim Clark (Lotus) started in fourth and got lucky at the start, because Hill's clutch would not bite. Surprisingly, it was Bruce McLaren (Cooper) that converted his fifth starting position into the lead of the race. Then the traditional slipstreaming commenced: Gurney and Surtees both went by McLaren half-way into the first lap, Surtees took the lead on lap 2, before Gurney was back in front on lap 5. On lap 27, Clark joined Hill in retirement with a broken piston on the Climax, and on lap 68, Gurney's engine began misfiring. He slowed his Brabham down, scoring no points for the sixth time this season, despite his outright pace. It left Surtees to take a comfortable win ahead of McLaren, who settled for 'best-of-the-rest' quite early on. Surtees's teammate Lorenzo Bandini took third, after a race-long battle gave him just half a car length advantage over Richie Ginther.

Surtees's win in Italy, coupled with Hill and Clark's retirements, had suddenly brought him into play for the Drivers' title and it had put Ferrari on top the Manufacturers' standings. The season traditionally ended outside of Europe and Watkins Glen hosted the United States Grand Prix for the fourth time. Clark started on pole, ahead of Surtees and Gurney. The Ferrari cars were not painted in traditional red but in white and blue, the national colours of the United States. This was done as a protest concerning arguments between Enzo Ferrari and the Automobile Club d'Italia regarding the homologation of Ferrari's new mid-engined Le Mans race car. The Ferrari cars were entered by the American privateer North American Racing Team. At the start, Clark lost out to Surtees and Lotus teammate Mike Spence, moving up from his sixth place on the grid. Hill had started fourth but, on lap 5, moved past both Spence and Clark, before Clark suddenly found his rhythm and passed all in front to take the lead. It looked like the Brit would run away with the win, but the Climax engine started having trouble picking up fuel. Team boss Colin Chapman called Spence into the pits to switch cars. (Clark would not have scored points in his teammate's car but, under the rules of the time, could at least try to push his rivals a place down the order.) However, that car struck mechanical troubles as well. Hill had snatched the lead and stayed there, finishing half a minute ahead of Surtees and a lap ahead of Jo Siffert in a privately run Brabham.

It was the third time in F1 history that the championship was decided at the final race and, for the first time, no less than three drivers and three manufacturers had a chance of winning the respective titles. For Hill (39 points) and Surtees (34), and for their teams Ferrari (43) and BRM (42), winning the race would be enough, no matter the results of others. Clark (30) and his team Lotus (36) had to win and, at the same time, hope that his rivals finished low enough. He started off well, at least, with a pole position, ahead of Gurney and Bandini. Surtees and Hill started fourth and sixth, respectively, and both had a slow getaway off the line. After the first third of the race, Clark was leading comfortably ahead of Gurney, who in turn was more than 10 seconds ahead of Hill, Bandini and Surtees. Hill and Bandini were busy fighting each other and even locked their wheels. Both spun, letting Surtees through and forcing Hill to pit. With eight laps to go, everyone expected Clark to win, until the race turned around like it had done in Belgium. But while Clark had been gifted an unexpected win at Spa, this time it was him that started losing fluids and had to slow right down. Gurney took the lead and scored his second win of the year. Bandini immediately let Surtees through, and the pair sprinted to the line. If Clark had finished ahead of Surtees, then Hill had become champion, but the Ferraris could relax when they saw the Lotus had ground to a halt on the last lap, gifting Surtees his first Formula One World Championship.

In the Drivers' Championship, John Surtees (Scuderia Ferrari, 40 points) was awarded the 1964 trophy, ahead of Graham Hill (BRM, 39) and Jim Clark (Lotus, 32). In the Manufacturers' Championship, Ferrari racked up 45 points, enough for their second title, ahead of BRM (42) and Lotus (37).

== Results and standings ==
=== Grands Prix ===
Round	Grand Prix	Pole position	Fastest lap	Winning driver	Winning constructor	Tyre	Report
1	Monaco Grand Prix	(United Kingdom) Jim Clark	(United Kingdom) Graham Hill	(United Kingdom) Graham Hill	(United Kingdom) BRM	D	Report
2	(Netherlands) Dutch Grand Prix	(United States) Dan Gurney	(United Kingdom) Jim Clark	(United Kingdom) Jim Clark	(United Kingdom) Lotus-Climax	D	Report
3	(Belgium) Belgian Grand Prix	(United States) Dan Gurney	(United States) Dan Gurney	(United Kingdom) Jim Clark	(United Kingdom) Lotus-Climax	D	Report
4	(France) French Grand Prix	(United Kingdom) Jim Clark	(Australia) Jack Brabham	(United States) Dan Gurney	(United Kingdom) Brabham-Climax	D	Report
5	(United Kingdom) British Grand Prix	(United Kingdom) Jim Clark	(United Kingdom) Jim Clark	(United Kingdom) Jim Clark	(United Kingdom) Lotus-Climax	D	Report
6	(West Germany) German Grand Prix	(United Kingdom) John Surtees	(United Kingdom) John Surtees	(United Kingdom) John Surtees	(Italy) Ferrari	D	Report
7	(Austria) Austrian Grand Prix	(United Kingdom) Graham Hill	(United States) Dan Gurney	(Italy) Lorenzo Bandini	(Italy) Ferrari	D	Report
8	(Italy) Italian Grand Prix	(United Kingdom) John Surtees	(United Kingdom) John Surtees	(United Kingdom) John Surtees	(Italy) Ferrari	D	Report
9	United States Grand Prix	(United Kingdom) Jim Clark	(United Kingdom) Jim Clark	(United Kingdom) Graham Hill	(United Kingdom) BRM	D	Report
10	(Mexico) Mexican Grand Prix	(United Kingdom) Jim Clark	(United Kingdom) Jim Clark	(United States) Dan Gurney	(United Kingdom) Brabham-Climax	D	Report

=== Scoring system ===
Points were awarded to the top six classified finishers. Only the best six results counted towards the championship.

The International Cup for F1 Manufacturers only counted the points of the highest-finishing driver for each race. Additionally, like the Drivers' Championship, only the best six results counted towards the cup.

Numbers without parentheses are championship points; numbers in parentheses are total points scored. Points were awarded in the following system:

Position	1st	2nd	3rd	4th	5th	6th
Race	9	6	4	3	2	1

=== World Drivers' Championship standings ===
Pos.	Driver	MON (Monaco)	NED (Netherlands)	BEL (Belgium)	FRA (France)	GBR (United Kingdom)	GER (West Germany)	AUT (Austria)	ITA (Italy)	USA (United States)	MEX (Mexico)	Pts.
1	(United Kingdom) John Surtees	Ret	2	Ret	Ret	3	1^{P}^{F}	Ret	1^{P}^{F}	2	2	40
2	(United Kingdom) Graham Hill	1^{F}	4	(5)	2	2	2	Ret^{P}	Ret	1	11	39 (41)
3	(United Kingdom) Jim Clark	4^{P}	1^{F}	1	Ret^{P}	1^{P}^{F}	Ret	Ret	Ret	7†^{P}^{F} / Ret	5^{P}^{F}	32
4	(Italy) Lorenzo Bandini	10	Ret	Ret	9	5	3	1	3	Ret	3	23
5	(United States) Richie Ginther	2	11	4	5	8	7	2	4	4	8	23
6	(United States) Dan Gurney	Ret	Ret^{P}	6^{P}^{F}	1	13	10	Ret^{F}	10	Ret	1	19
7	(New Zealand) Bruce McLaren	Ret	7	2	6	Ret	Ret	Ret	2	Ret	7	13
8	(Australia) Jack Brabham	Ret	Ret	3	3^{F}	4	12	9	14	Ret	Ret	11
=	(United Kingdom) Peter Arundell	3	3	9	4							11
10	(Switzerland) Jo Siffert	8	13	Ret	Ret	11	4	Ret	7	3	Ret	7
11	(United Kingdom) Bob Anderson	7	6	DNS	12	7	Ret	3	11			5
12	(United Kingdom) Mike Spence					9	8	Ret	6	7† / Ret	4	4
=	(South Africa) Tony Maggs		DNS	DNS		Ret	6	4				4
14	(United Kingdom) Innes Ireland	DNS		10	Ret	10		5	5	Ret	12	4
15	(Sweden) Jo Bonnier	5	9	Ret		Ret	Ret	6	12	Ret	Ret	3
16	(New Zealand) Chris Amon	DNQ	5	Ret	10	Ret	11	Ret		Ret	Ret	2
=	(France) Maurice Trintignant	Ret			11	DNQ	5		Ret			2
=	(United States) Walt Hansgen									5		2
19	(United States) Phil Hill	9	8	Ret	7	6	Ret	Ret		Ret	9	1
=	(United Kingdom) Trevor Taylor	Ret		7	Ret	Ret		Ret	DNQ	6	Ret	1
=	(United Kingdom) Mike Hailwood	6	12		8	Ret	Ret	8	Ret	8	Ret	1
=	(Mexico) Pedro Rodríguez										6	1
—	(Italy) Giancarlo Baghetti		10	8		12	Ret	7	8			0
—	(West Germany) Gerhard Mitter						9					0
—	(Italy) Ludovico Scarfiotti								9			0
—	(Mexico) Moisés Solana										10	0
—	(United States) Peter Revson	DNQ		DSQ	DNS	Ret	14		13			0
—	(United States) Ronnie Bucknum						13		Ret	Ret		0
—	(United States) Hap Sharp									NC	13	0
—	(United Kingdom) John Taylor					14						0
—	(Netherlands) Carel Godin de Beaufort		Ret				DNS					0
—	(Belgium) André Pilette			Ret			DNQ					0
—	(United Kingdom) Ian Raby					Ret			DNQ			0
—	(Australia) Frank Gardner					Ret						0
—	(West Germany) Edgar Barth						Ret					0
—	(Austria) Jochen Rindt							Ret				0
—	(Portugal) Mário de Araújo Cabral								Ret			0
—	(United Kingdom) Richard Attwood					DNS						0
—	(Switzerland) Jean-Claude Rudaz								DNS			0
—	(France) Bernard Collomb	DNQ										0
—	(Rhodesia) John Love								DNQ			0
—	(Italy) Geki								DNQ			0
Pos.	Driver	MON (Monaco)	NED (Netherlands)	BEL (Belgium)	FRA (France)	GBR (United Kingdom)	GER (West Germany)	AUT (Austria)	ITA (Italy)	USA (United States)	MEX (Mexico)	Pts.

Key
Colour	Result
Gold	Winner
Silver	Second place
Bronze	Third place
Green	Other points position
Blue	Other classified position
Blue	Not classified, finished (NC)
Purple	Not classified, retired (Ret)
Red	Did not qualify (DNQ)
Black	Disqualified (DSQ)
White	Did not start (DNS)
White	Race cancelled (C)
Blank	Did not practice (DNP)
Blank	Excluded (EX)
Blank	Did not arrive (DNA)
Blank	Withdrawn (WD)
Blank	Did not enter (empty cell)
Annotation	Meaning
P	Pole position
F	Fastest lap

- † = Car driven by more than one driver

=== International Cup for F1 Manufacturers standings ===
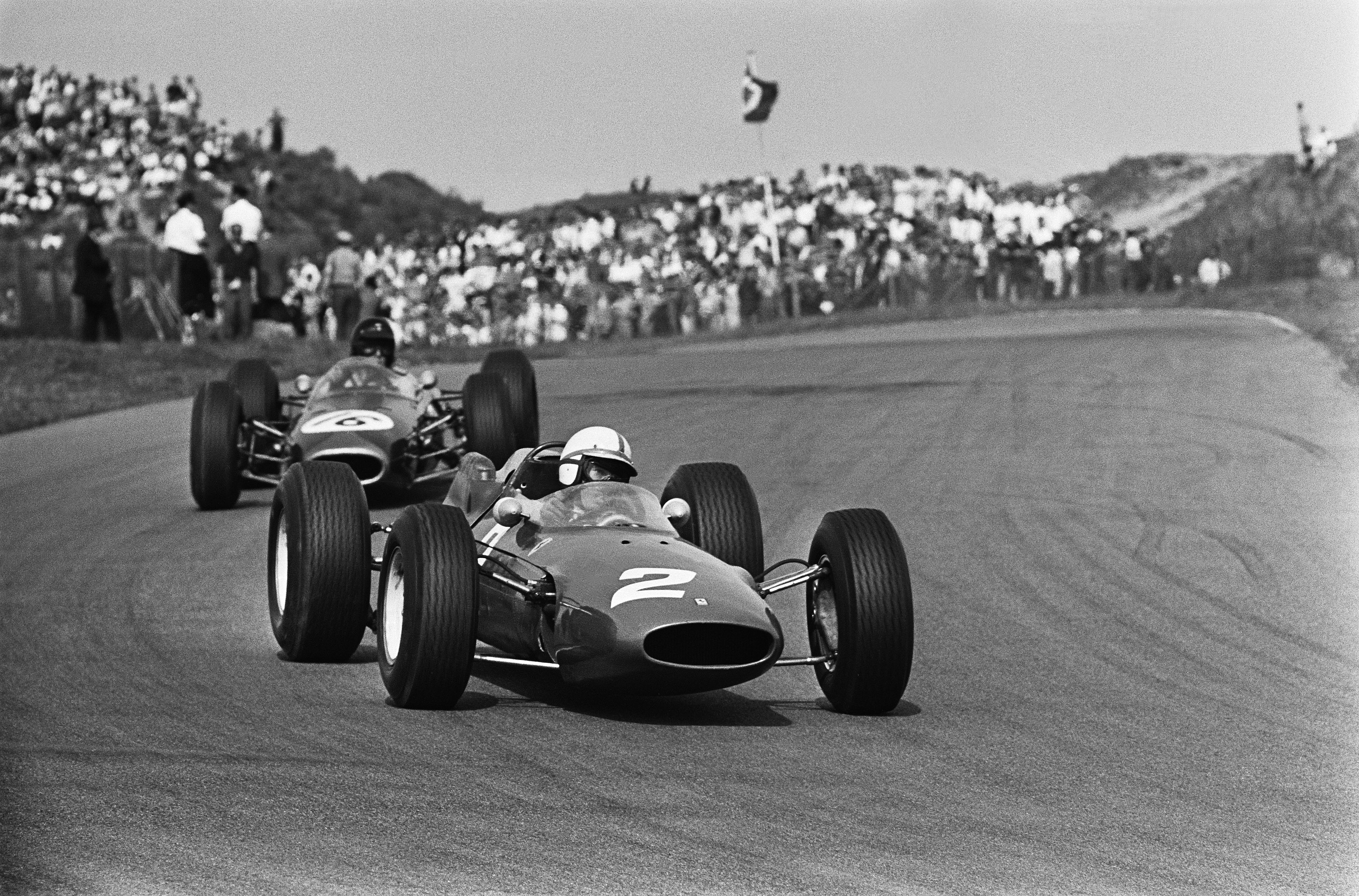
Ferrari won the International Cup for F1 Manufacturers with its 158 (pictured) and 156 F1 models

Pos.	Manufacturer	MON (Monaco)	NED (Netherlands)	BEL (Belgium)	FRA (France)	GBR (United Kingdom)	GER (West Germany)	AUT (Austria)	ITA (Italy)	USA (United States)	MEX (Mexico)	Pts.
1	(Italy) Ferrari	10	**2**	Ret	9	(3)	**1**	**1**	**1**	**2**	**2**	45 (49)
2	(United Kingdom) BRM	**1**	(4)	(4)	**2**	**2**	**2**	**2**	(4)	**1**	8	42 (51)
3	(United Kingdom) Lotus-Climax	**3**	**1**	**1**	**4**	**1**	8	Ret	(6)	(5)	**4**	37 (40)
4	(United Kingdom) Brabham-Climax	7	**6**	**3**	**1**	**4**	10	**3**	10	Ret	**1**	30
5	(United Kingdom) Cooper-Climax	**5**	7	**2**	**6**	**6**	Ret	Ret	**2**	Ret	7	16
6	(United Kingdom) Brabham-BRM		9		Ret	11	**4**	Ret	7	**3**	13	7
7	(United Kingdom) BRP-BRM	Ret		7	Ret	10		**5**	**5**	**6**	12	5
8	(United Kingdom) Lotus-BRM	**6**	**5**	Ret	8	Ret	11	8	13	8	Ret	3
—	(Japan) Honda						13		Ret	Ret		0
—	(United Kingdom) Cooper-Ford					14						0
—	(United Kingdom) Scirocco-Climax	WD		Ret			DNQ					0
—	(West Germany) Porsche		Ret				DNS					0
—	(United Kingdom) Brabham-Ford					Ret						0
—	(Italy) ATS								Ret			0
Pos.	Manufacturer	MON (Monaco)	NED (Netherlands)	BEL (Belgium)	FRA (France)	GBR (United Kingdom)	GER (West Germany)	AUT (Austria)	ITA (Italy)	USA (United States)	MEX (Mexico)	Pts.

* Bold = results counted to championship totals

== Non-championship races ==
Eight other races which did not count towards the World Championship of Drivers and the International Cup for F1 Manufacturers were held for Formula One cars during the season.

Race Name	Circuit	Date	Winning driver	Constructor	Report
(United Kingdom) II Daily Mirror Trophy	Snetterton	14 March	(United Kingdom) Innes Ireland	(United Kingdom) BRP-BRM	Report
(United Kingdom) I News of the World Trophy	Goodwood	30 March	(United Kingdom) Jim Clark	(United Kingdom) Lotus-Climax	Report
(Italy) XIII Syracuse Grand Prix	Syracuse	12 April	(United Kingdom) John Surtees	(Italy) Ferrari	Report
(United Kingdom) IX Aintree 200	Aintree	18 April	(Australia) Jack Brabham	(United Kingdom) Brabham-Climax	Report
(United Kingdom) XVI BRDC International Trophy	Silverstone	2 May	(Australia) Jack Brabham	(United Kingdom) Brabham-Climax	Report
(West Germany) XIV Solitude Grand Prix	Solitudering	19 July	(United Kingdom) Jim Clark	(United Kingdom) Lotus-Climax	Report
(Italy) III Mediterranean Grand Prix	Pergusa	16 August	(Switzerland) Jo Siffert	(United Kingdom) Brabham-BRM	Report
(South Africa) VII Rand Grand Prix	Kyalami	12 December	(United Kingdom) Graham Hill	(United Kingdom) Brabham-BRM	Report
