= Peter Arundell =

British racing driver (1933–2009)

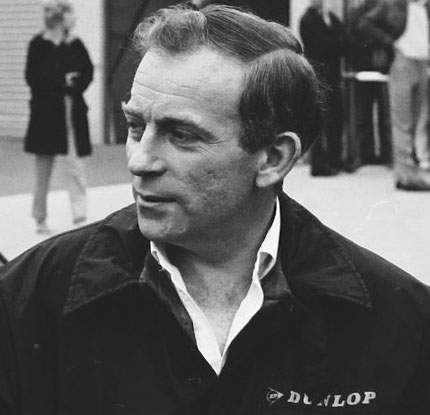
- Arundell at the 1968 German Grand Prix
- Born: Peter John Arundell; 8 November 1933; Ilford, Essex, England
- Died: 16 June 2009 (aged 75); King's Lynn, Norfolk, England

Formula One World Championship career
- Nationality: (United Kingdom) British
- Active years: 1963–1964, 1966
- Team: Lotus
- Entries: 13 (11 starts)
- Championships: 0
- Wins: 0
- Podiums: 2
- Career points: 12
- Pole positions: 0
- Fastest laps: 0
- First entry: 1963 French Grand Prix
- Last entry: 1966 Mexican Grand Prix

Peter John Arundell (8 November 1933 – 16 June 2009) was a British racing driver, who competed in Formula One at 13 Grands Prix between 1963 and 1966. (Note: The exact years Arundell competed in Formula One: 1963–1964, 1966.)

Arundell participated in 13 World Championship Grands Prix for Lotus, debuting at the 1963 French Grand Prix. He scored 12 championship points and achieved two podiums, at the Monaco and Dutch Grands Prix in 1964.

== Life and career ==
Peter John Arundell was born on 8 November 1933 in Ilford, Essex, England. Arundell became a professional racing driver after finishing his time in the Royal Air Force, competing in Elva and Lotus cars. He won an early Formula Junior race held in England, the John Davy Trophy at the Boxing Day Brands Hatch meeting in an Elva-D.K.W. in 1959. In 1962, he won the British Formula Junior championship in a Lotus 22, and also in 1963 in a Lotus 27. He also won the Monaco Formula Junior race in 1961 and 1962. He won the last Formula Junior race held in England, the Anglo-European Formula Junior Trophy, also at Brands Hatch, in September 1963, in a Lotus 27-Ford.

Arundell marked his arrival in the Formula One World Championship in 1964 with two podium finishes. He was regarded as a strong prospect for the future and a great supporting driver for World Champion Jim Clark.

In 1964, while racing in Formula Two at Reims-Gueux, Arundell had a spin and was hit at high speed by Richie Ginther; Arundell was thrown from the car in the impact, which resulted in him missing most of the 1965 season. Lotus boss Colin Chapman saved his place in the team for 1966, with Arundell finishing third on his comeback in the non-championship South African Grand Prix at East London on 1 January 1966. He did not enjoy any great success and at the end of that year he retired from Formula One, having started only 11 races.

Arundell retired from racing altogether in 1969, and later moved to Florida, where he set up a software company.

== Racing record ==
=== Complete Formula One World Championship results ===
(key) (Races in bold indicate pole position) (Races in italics indicate fastest lap)

Year	Entrant	Chassis	Engine	1	2	3	4	5	6	7	8	9	10	WDC	Points
1963	Team Lotus	Lotus 25	Climax V8	MON	BEL	NED	FRA; DNS	GBR	GER	ITA	USA	MEX	RSA	NC	0
1964	Team Lotus	Lotus 25	Climax V8	MON; 3	NED; 3	BEL; 9	FRA; 4	GBR	GER	AUT	ITA	USA	MEX	8th	11
1966	Team Lotus	Lotus 43	BRM H16	MON	BEL; DNS	FRA; Ret								17th	1
1966	Team Lotus	Lotus 33	BRM V8				GBR; Ret	NED; Ret	GER; 12	ITA; 8		MEX; 7		17th	1
1966	Team Lotus	Lotus 33	Climax V8								USA; 6			17th	1

=== Non-Championship Formula One results ===
(key) (Races in bold indicate pole position) (Races in italics indicate fastest lap)

Year	Entrant	Chassis	Engine	1	2	3	4	5	6	7	8	9	10	11	12	13	14	15	16	17	18	19	20	21
1961	Team Lotus	Lotus 18	Climax Straight-4	LOM	GLV	PAU	BRX	VIE	AIN	SYR	NAP	LON	SIL	SOL; DNS	KAN	DAN	MOD	FLG	OUL	LEW	VAL	RAN	NAT	RSA
1962	Team Lotus	Lotus 21	Climax Straight-4	CAP	BRX	LOM; DNA	LAV	GLV	PAU	AIN	INT	NAP												
1962	Team Lotus	Lotus 24	Climax V8										MAL; DNA	CLP		SOL; DNA	KAN	MED; DNA	DAN	OUL		RAN	NAT	
1962	Team Lotus	Lotus 24	BRM V8												RMS; Ret^{1}									
1963	Team Lotus	Lotus 25	Climax V8	LOM	GLV	PAU	IMO	SYR	AIN	INT; DNA	ROM	SOL; 2	KAN	MED	AUT; DNS	OUL; DNA	RAN							
1964	Team Lotus	Lotus 25	Climax V8	DMT; Ret	NWT; 2	SYR; 3	AIN; 3	INT; 3	SOL	MED	RAN													
1966	Team Lotus	Lotus 33	Climax V8	RSA; 3	SYR	INT	OUL; DNS^{2}																	

^{1} Following problems with his own car, Jim Clark took over Arundell's car but then ran out of fuel.
^{2} The engine in Jim Clark's Lotus 43 blew up during practice and Clark took over Arundell's car.

=== Complete British Saloon Car Championship results ===
(key) (Races in bold indicate pole position; races in italics indicate fastest lap.)

Year	Team	Car	Class	1	2	3	4	5	6	7	8	9	10	11	DC	Pts	Class
1964	Team Lotus	Ford Cortina Lotus	B	SNE; Ret	GOO; 3	OUL	AIN; 4	SIL; 5	CRY; 2†	BRH	OUL				5th	24	**2nd**
1966	Team Lotus	Ford Cortina Lotus	C	SNE; 5	GOO; 5	SIL; 3	**CRY**; Ret†	BRH	BRH; 3	OUL; 6†	BRH; 2				**3rd**	**38**	**1st**
1968	Alan Mann Racing	Ford Escort TC	C	BRH	THR	SIL	CRY; Ret†	MAL; 4†	BRH	SIL; 26	CRO	OUL	BRH	BRH	38th	4	10th

† Events with 2 races staged for the different classes.
