= 1964 French Grand Prix =

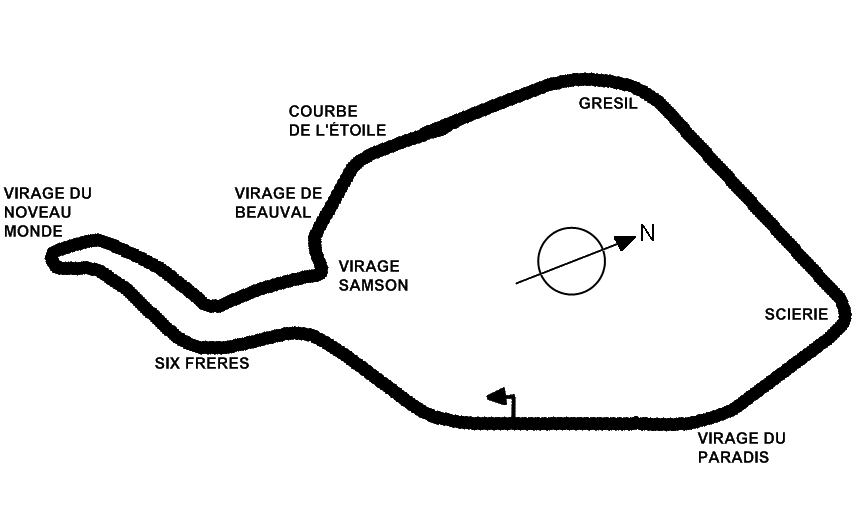

Race details
- Date: 28 June 1964
- Official name: 50e Grand Prix de l'A.C.F.
- Location: Rouen-Les-Essarts, Rouen, France
- Course: Permanent racing facility
- Course length: 6.542 km (4.066 mi)
- Distance: 57 laps, 372.894 km (231.755 mi)
- Weather: Dry

Pole position
Driver	(United Kingdom) Jim Clark	Lotus-Climax
- Time: 2:09.6

Fastest lap
Driver	(Australia) Jack Brabham	Brabham-Climax
- Time: 2:11.4 on lap 44

Podium
First	(United States) Dan Gurney	Brabham-Climax
Second	(United Kingdom) Graham Hill	BRM
Third	(Australia) Jack Brabham	Brabham-Climax

The 1964 French Grand Prix (formally the 50e Grand Prix de l'A.C.F.) was a Formula One motor race held on 28 June 1964 at the Rouen-Les-Essarts circuit, Rouen, France. It was race 4 of 10 in both the 1964 World Championship of Drivers and the 1964 International Cup for Formula One Manufacturers.

The 57-lap race was won by Dan Gurney, driving a works Brabham-Climax, after starting from second position. Graham Hill finished second in a BRM, having started sixth, with Jack Brabham third in the other works Brabham-Climax.

== Classification ==
=== Qualifying ===
Pos	No	Driver	Constructor	Qualifying times		Gap
Pos	No	Driver	Constructor	Q1	Q2	Gap
1	2	(United Kingdom) Jim Clark	Lotus-Climax	2:09.6	2:10.8	—
2	22	(United States) Dan Gurney	Brabham-Climax	2:10.1	2:10.5	+0.5
3	24	(United Kingdom) John Surtees	Ferrari	No time	2:11.1	+1.5
4	4	(United Kingdom) Peter Arundell	Lotus-Climax	2:11.6	2:12.1	+2.0
5	20	(Australia) Jack Brabham	Brabham-Climax	2:12.3	2:11.8	+2.2
6	8	(United Kingdom) Graham Hill	BRM	2:12.1	2:12.9	+2.5
7	12	(New Zealand) Bruce McLaren	Cooper-Climax	2:13.9	2:12.4	+2.8
8	26	(Italy) Lorenzo Bandini	Ferrari	No time	2:12.8	+3.2
9	10	(United States) Richie Ginther	BRM	2:14.6	2:13.9	+4.3
10	14	(United States) Phil Hill	Cooper-Climax	2:14.5	2:15.4	+4.9
11	16	(United Kingdom) Innes Ireland	BRP-BRM	2:15.3	2:14.8	+5.2
12	18	(United Kingdom) Trevor Taylor	BRP-BRM	2:16.3	2:14.9	+5.3
13	36	(United Kingdom) Mike Hailwood	Lotus-BRM	—	2:16.2	+6.6
14	34	(New Zealand) Chris Amon	Lotus-BRM	2:24.3	2:16.4	+6.8
15	32	(United Kingdom) Bob Anderson	Brabham-Climax	2:17.4	2:16.9	+7.3
16	36	(United States) Peter Revson	Lotus-BRM	2:18.5	—	+8.9
17	28	(France) Maurice Trintignant	BRM	2:26.3	2:21.5	+11.9
18	30	(Switzerland) Jo Siffert	Brabham-BRM	2:23.6	No time	+14.0

=== Race ===
Pos	No	Driver	Constructor	Laps	Time/Retired	Grid	Points
1	22	(United States) Dan Gurney	Brabham-Climax	57	2:07:49.1	2	9
2	8	(United Kingdom) Graham Hill	BRM	57	+ 24.1	6	6
3	20	(Australia) Jack Brabham	Brabham-Climax	57	+ 24.9	5	4
4	4	(United Kingdom) Peter Arundell	Lotus-Climax	57	+ 1:10.6	4	3
5	10	(United States) Richie Ginther	BRM	57	+ 2:12.1	9	2
6	12	(New Zealand) Bruce McLaren	Cooper-Climax	56	+ 1 Lap	7	1
7	14	(United States) Phil Hill	Cooper-Climax	56	+ 1 Lap	10	
8	36	(United Kingdom) Mike Hailwood	Lotus-BRM	56	+ 1 Lap	13	
9	26	(Italy) Lorenzo Bandini	Ferrari	55	+ 2 Laps	8	
10	34	(New Zealand) Chris Amon	Lotus-BRM	53	+ 4 Laps	14	
11	28	(France) Maurice Trintignant	BRM	52	+ 5 Laps	16	
12	32	(United Kingdom) Bob Anderson	Brabham-Climax	50	+ 7 Laps	15	
Ret	16	(United Kingdom) Innes Ireland	BRP-BRM	32	Accident	11	
Ret	2	(United Kingdom) Jim Clark	Lotus-Climax	31	Engine	1	
Ret	24	(United Kingdom) John Surtees	Ferrari	6	Engine	3	
Ret	18	(United Kingdom) Trevor Taylor	BRP-BRM	6	Brakes/Accident	12	
Ret	30	(Switzerland) Jo Siffert	Brabham-BRM	4	Clutch	17	
DNS	36	(United States) Peter Revson	Lotus-BRM		Car raced by Hailwood		

== Notes ==
- This was the first Formula One World Championship Grand Prix win for the Brabham team. It was Dan Gurney's second win in Formula One, which made both his wins the first for the team he drove for. He had previously won the 1962 French Grand Prix with Porsche, being Porsche's first and only Grand Prix win as a constructor and the first as an engine supplier.

== Championship standings after the race ==
Drivers' Championship standings

	Pos	Driver	Points
	1	(United Kingdom) Jim Clark	21
	2	(United Kingdom) Graham Hill	20
	3	(United States) Richie Ginther	11
	4	(United Kingdom) Peter Arundell	11
7	5	(United States) Dan Gurney	10

Constructors' Championship standings

	Pos	Constructor	Points
	1	(United Kingdom) Lotus-Climax	25
	2	(United Kingdom) BRM	21
2	3	(United Kingdom) Brabham-Climax	14
1	4	(United Kingdom) Cooper-Climax	9
1	5	(Italy) Ferrari	6

- Notes: Only the top five positions are included for both sets of standings.

Previous race: 1964 Belgian Grand Prix	FIA Formula One World Championship; 1964 season	Next race: 1964 British Grand Prix
Previous race: 1963 French Grand Prix	French Grand Prix	Next race: 1965 French Grand Prix
