= 1964 Belgian Grand Prix =

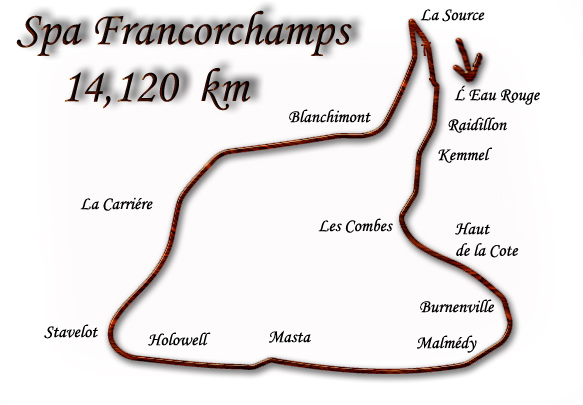

Race details
- Date: 14 June 1964
- Official name: XXIV Grand Prix de Belgique
- Location: Circuit de Spa-Francorchamps; Spa, Belgium
- Course: Permanent racing facility
- Course length: 14.100 km (8.761 mi)
- Distance: 32 laps, 451.200 km (280.363 mi)
- Weather: Dry

Pole position
Driver	(United States) Dan Gurney	Brabham-Climax
- Time: 3:50.9

Fastest lap
Driver	(United States) Dan Gurney	Brabham-Climax
- Time: 3:49.2 on lap 27

Podium
First	(United Kingdom) Jim Clark	Lotus-Climax
Second	(New Zealand) Bruce McLaren	Cooper-Climax
Third	(Australia) Jack Brabham	Brabham-Climax

The 1964 Belgian Grand Prix was a Formula One motor race held at Spa-Francorchamps on 14 June 1964. It was race 3 of 10 in both the 1964 World Championship of Drivers and the 1964 International Cup for Formula One Manufacturers.

Jim Clark gained a surprise victory, due to Dan Gurney running out of fuel while leading most of the race, Graham Hill retiring while leading on the last two laps, and had also just managed to hold off Bruce McLaren at the flag. This was also Clark's third consecutive victory in Belgium. Peter Revson was disqualified because he received a push start after his engine cut out.

== Classification ==
=== Qualifying ===
Pos	No	Driver	Constructor	Qualifying times		Gap
Pos	No	Driver	Constructor	Q1	Q2	Gap
1	15	(United States) Dan Gurney	Brabham-Climax	3:50.9	3:51.7	—
2	1	(United Kingdom) Graham Hill	BRM	3:57.3	3:52.7	+1.8
3	14	(Australia) Jack Brabham	Brabham-Climax	4:04.9	3:52.8	+1.9
4	24	(United Kingdom) Peter Arundell	Lotus-Climax	4:04.0	3:52.8	+1.9
5	10	(United Kingdom) John Surtees	Ferrari	3:55.2	3:59.6	+4.3
6	23	(United Kingdom) Jim Clark	Lotus-Climax	3:57.5	3:56.2	+5.3
7	20	(New Zealand) Bruce McLaren	Cooper-Climax	3:58.8	3:56.2	+5.3
8	2	(United States) Richie Ginther	BRM	3:57.2	3:58.2	+6.3
9	11	(Italy) Lorenzo Bandini	Ferrari	3:59.2	3:58.8	+7.9
10	29	(United States) Peter Revson	Lotus-BRM	4:06.9	3:59.9	+9.0
11	27	(New Zealand) Chris Amon	Lotus-BRM	4:04.8	4:00.1	+9.2
12	4	(United Kingdom) Trevor Taylor	BRP-BRM	4:07.3	4:00.2	+9.3
13	17	(Switzerland) Jo Siffert	Brabham-BRM	4:07.8	4:02.7	+11.8
14	16	(Sweden) Jo Bonnier	Brabham-BRM	4:59.9	4:02.7	+11.8
15	21	(United States) Phil Hill	Cooper-Climax	4:02.8	4:06.7	+11.9
16	3	(United Kingdom) Innes Ireland	BRP-BRM	4:04.0	4:04.3	+13.1
17	6	(Italy) Giancarlo Baghetti	BRM	No time	4:07.6	+16.7
18	7	(South Africa) Tony Maggs	BRM	No time	4:07.8	+16.9
19	18	(United Kingdom) Bob Anderson	Brabham-Climax	4:25.3	4:08.5	+17.6
20	28	(Belgium) André Pilette	Scirocco-Climax	4:28.2	4:22.9	+32.0

=== Race ===
Pos	No	Driver	Constructor	Laps	Time/Retired	Grid	Points
1	23	(United Kingdom) Jim Clark	Lotus-Climax	32	2:06:40.5	6	9
2	20	(New Zealand) Bruce McLaren	Cooper-Climax	32	+ 3.4	7	6
3	14	(Australia) Jack Brabham	Brabham-Climax	32	+ 48.1	3	4
4	2	(United States) Richie Ginther	BRM	32	+ 1:58.6	8	3
5	1	(United Kingdom) Graham Hill	BRM	31	Fuel Pump	2	2
6	15	(United States) Dan Gurney	Brabham-Climax	31	Out of Fuel	1	1
7	4	(United Kingdom) Trevor Taylor	BRP-BRM	31	+ 1 lap	12	
8	6	(Italy) Giancarlo Baghetti	BRM	31	+ 1 lap	17	
9	24	(United Kingdom) Peter Arundell	Lotus-Climax	28	Overheating	4	
10	3	(United Kingdom) Innes Ireland	BRP-BRM	28	+ 4 laps	16	
DSQ	29	(United States) Peter Revson	Lotus-BRM	28	Push start	10	
Ret	17	(Switzerland) Jo Siffert	Brabham-BRM	14	Engine	13	
Ret	21	(United States) Phil Hill	Cooper-Climax	13	Engine	15	
Ret	11	(Italy) Lorenzo Bandini	Ferrari	12	Engine	9	
Ret	28	(Belgium) André Pilette	Scirocco-Climax	11	Engine	20	
Ret	16	(Sweden) Jo Bonnier	Brabham-BRM	8	Unwell	14	
Ret	10	(United Kingdom) John Surtees	Ferrari	3	Engine	5	
Ret	27	(New Zealand) Chris Amon	Lotus-BRM	3	Engine	11	
DNS	7	(South Africa) Tony Maggs	BRM		Engine	(18)	
DNS	18	(United Kingdom) Bob Anderson	Brabham-Climax		Ignition	(19)	

== Notes ==
- This was the 50th race for a BRM-powered car.

== Championship standings after the race ==
Drivers' Championship standings

	Pos	Driver	Points
1	1	(United Kingdom) Jim Clark	21
1	2	(United Kingdom) Graham Hill	14
1	3	(United States) Richie Ginther	9
1	4	(United Kingdom) Peter Arundell	8
5	5	(New Zealand) Bruce McLaren	6

Constructors' Championship standings

	Pos	Constructor	Points
	1	(United Kingdom) Lotus-Climax	22
	2	(United Kingdom) BRM	15
2	3	(United Kingdom) Cooper-Climax	8
1	4	(Italy) Ferrari	6
1	5	(United Kingdom) Brabham-Climax	5

- Notes: Only the top five positions are included for both sets of standings.
- Only the best 6 results counted toward the championship so Graham Hill's 5th-place finish was eventually left out.

Previous race: 1964 Dutch Grand Prix	FIA Formula One World Championship; 1964 season	Next race: 1964 French Grand Prix
Previous race: 1963 Belgian Grand Prix	Belgian Grand Prix	Next race: 1965 Belgian Grand Prix
