= 1964 Monaco Grand Prix =

Coordinates: 43°44′4.74″N 7°25′16.8″E

- Race 1 of 10 in the 1964 Formula One season
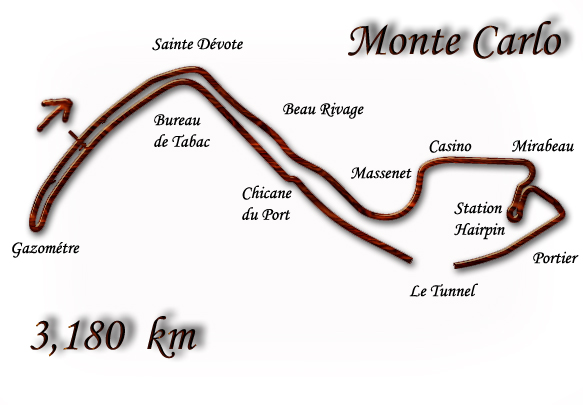

Race details
- Date: 10 May 1964
- Official name: XXII Grand Prix de Monaco
- Location: Circuit de Monaco; Monte Carlo
- Course: Temporary street circuit
- Course length: 3.145 km (1.954 mi)
- Distance: 100 laps, 314.500 km (195.421 mi)

Pole position
Driver	(United Kingdom) Jim Clark	Lotus-Climax
- Time: 1:34.0

Fastest lap
Driver	(United Kingdom) Graham Hill	BRM
- Time: 1:33.9 on lap 53

Podium
First	(United Kingdom) Graham Hill	BRM
Second	(United States) Richie Ginther	BRM
Third	(United Kingdom) Peter Arundell	Lotus-Climax

The 1964 Monaco Grand Prix was a Formula One motor race held at Monaco on 10 May 1964. It was race 1 of 10 in both the 1964 World Championship of Drivers and the 1964 International Cup for Formula One Manufacturers. Peter Arundell scored his first podium finish, and Mike Hailwood his first point.

== Classification ==
=== Qualifying ===
Pos	No	Driver	Constructor	Qualifying times			Gap
Pos	No	Driver	Constructor	Q1	Q2	Q3	Gap
1	12	(United Kingdom) Jim Clark	Lotus-Climax	No time	1:34.0	1:34.9	—
2	5	(Australia) Jack Brabham	Brabham-Climax	1:35.1	1:34.1	1:36.5	+0.1
3	8	(United Kingdom) Graham Hill	BRM	1:35.3	1:34.8	1:34.5	+0.5
4	21	(United Kingdom) John Surtees	Ferrari	1:35.0	1:35.6	1:34.5	+0.5
5	6	(United States) Dan Gurney	Brabham-Climax	No time	1:34.7	1:34.7	+0.7
6	11	(United Kingdom) Peter Arundell	Lotus-Climax	1:37.3	1:35.5	No time	+1.5
7	20	(Italy) Lorenzo Bandini	Ferrari	1:36.0	1:35.5	1:36.5	+1.5
8	7	(United States) Richie Ginther	BRM	1:38.1	1:36.5	1:35.9	+1.9
9	9	(United States) Phil Hill	Cooper-Climax	1:37.0	1:35.9	1:39.5	+1.9
10	10	(New Zealand) Bruce McLaren	Cooper-Climax	1:37.7	1:36.6	1:37.8	+2.6
11	19	(Sweden) Jo Bonnier	Cooper-Climax	1:38.6	1:37.9	1:37.4	+3.4
12	16	(United Kingdom) Bob Anderson	Brabham-Climax	1:40.0	1:38.3	1:38.0	+4.0
13	4	(France) Maurice Trintignant	BRM	1:38.5	1:38.3	1:38.1	+4.1
14	15	(United Kingdom) Trevor Taylor	BRP-BRM	1:38.2	1:38.1	1:38.5	+4.1
15	14	(United Kingdom) Innes Ireland	Lotus-BRM	1:38.2	No time	No time	+4.2
16	18	(United Kingdom) Mike Hailwood	Lotus-BRM	1:39.6	1:38.5	1:39.2	+4.5
17	24	(Switzerland) Jo Siffert	Lotus-BRM	1:39.4	1:39.8	1:38.7	+4.7
18	17	(New Zealand) Chris Amon	Lotus-BRM	1:40.8	1:39.8	1:39.1	+5.1
19	2	(United States) Peter Revson	Lotus-BRM	1:44.2	1:39.9	1:39.9	+5.9
20	3	(France) Bernard Collomb	Lotus-Climax	1:44.4	1:41.8	1:41.4	+7.4

=== Race ===
Pos	No	Driver	Constructor	Laps	Time/Retired	Grid	Points
1	8	(United Kingdom) Graham Hill	BRM	100	2:41:19.5	3	9
2	7	(United States) Richie Ginther	BRM	99	+ 1 lap	8	6
3	11	(United Kingdom) Peter Arundell	Lotus-Climax	97	+ 3 laps	6	4
4	12	(United Kingdom) Jim Clark	Lotus-Climax	96	Engine	1	3
5	19	(Sweden) Jo Bonnier	Cooper-Climax	96	+ 4 laps	11	2
6	18	(United Kingdom) Mike Hailwood	Lotus-BRM	96	+ 4 laps	15	1
7	16	(United Kingdom) Bob Anderson	Brabham-Climax	86	Gearbox	12	
8	24	(Switzerland) Jo Siffert	Lotus-BRM	78	+ 22 laps	16	
9	9	(United States) Phil Hill	Cooper-Climax	70	Suspension	9	
10	20	(Italy) Lorenzo Bandini	Ferrari	68	Gearbox	7	
Ret	6	(United States) Dan Gurney	Brabham-Climax	62	Gearbox	5	
Ret	4	(France) Maurice Trintignant	BRM	53	Overheating	13	
Ret	5	(Australia) Jack Brabham	Brabham-Climax	29	Injection	2	
Ret	10	(New Zealand) Bruce McLaren	Cooper-Climax	17	Wheel Bearing	10	
Ret	21	(United Kingdom) John Surtees	Ferrari	15	Gearbox	4	
Ret	15	(United Kingdom) Trevor Taylor	BRP-BRM	8	Fuel Leak	14	
DNS	14	(United Kingdom) Innes Ireland	Lotus-BRM		Practice accident		
DNQ	17	(New Zealand) Chris Amon	Lotus-BRM				
DNQ	2	(United States) Peter Revson	Lotus-BRM				
DNQ	3	(France) Bernard Collomb	Lotus-Climax				
WD	1	(Belgium) André Pilette	Scirocco-Climax				
WD	22	(Italy) Giancarlo Baghetti	BRM		Car not ready		
WD	23	(South Africa) Tony Maggs	BRM		Car not ready		

== Notes ==
- This was the Formula One World Championship debut race for American driver and future Grand Prix winner Peter Revson.

== Championship standings after the race ==
Drivers' Championship standings

Pos	Driver	Points
1	(United Kingdom) Graham Hill	9
2	(United States) Richie Ginther	6
3	(United Kingdom) Peter Arundell	4
4	(United Kingdom) Jim Clark	3
5	(Sweden) Jo Bonnier	2

Constructors' Championship standings

Pos	Constructor	Points
1	(United Kingdom) BRM	9
2	(United Kingdom) Lotus-Climax	4
3	(United Kingdom) Cooper-Climax	2
4	(United Kingdom) Lotus-BRM	1

- Notes: Only the top five positions are included for both sets of standings.

Previous race: 1963 South African Grand Prix	FIA Formula One World Championship; 1964 season	Next race: 1964 Dutch Grand Prix
Previous race: 1963 Monaco Grand Prix	Monaco Grand Prix	Next race: 1965 Monaco Grand Prix
