= 1964 Dutch Grand Prix =

- Zandvoort original layout

Race details
- Date: 24 May 1964
- Official name: XII Grote Prijs van Nederland
- Location: Circuit Park Zandvoort; Zandvoort, Netherlands
- Course: Permanent racing facility
- Course length: 4.193 km (2.605 mi)
- Distance: 80 laps, 335.440 km (208.433 mi)
- Weather: Dry

Pole position
Driver	(United States) Dan Gurney	Brabham-Climax
- Time: 1:31.2

Fastest lap
Driver	(United Kingdom) Jim Clark	Lotus-Climax
- Time: 1:32.8 on lap 6

Podium
First	(United Kingdom) Jim Clark	Lotus-Climax
Second	(United Kingdom) John Surtees	Ferrari
Third	(United Kingdom) Peter Arundell	Lotus-Climax

The 1964 Dutch Grand Prix was a Formula One motor race held at Zandvoort on 24 May 1964. It was race 2 of 10 in both the 1964 World Championship of Drivers and the 1964 International Cup for Formula One Manufacturers. The 80-lap race was won by Lotus driver Jim Clark after he started from second position. John Surtees finished second for the Ferrari team and Clark's teammate Peter Arundell came in third.

== Classification ==
=== Qualifying ===
Pos	No	Driver	Constructor	Qualifying times			Gap
Pos	No	Driver	Constructor	Q1	Q2	Q3	Gap
1	16	(United States) Dan Gurney	Brabham-Climax	1:31.2	1:32.3	1:33.0	—
2	18	(United Kingdom) Jim Clark	Lotus-Climax	1:31.6	1:31.3	1:32.6	+0.1
3	6	(United Kingdom) Graham Hill	BRM	1:32.4	1:31.4	1:32.2	+0.2
4	2	(United Kingdom) John Surtees	Ferrari	1:33.8	1:32.8	1:33.0	+1.6
5	24	(New Zealand) Bruce McLaren	Cooper-Climax	1:36.6	1:35.6	1:33.3	+2.1
6	20	(United Kingdom) Peter Arundell	Lotus-Climax	1:35.5	1:33.5	1:34.0	+2.3
7	14	(Australia) Jack Brabham	Brabham-Climax	1:33.8	No time	No time	+2.6
8	8	(United States) Richie Ginther	BRM	1:34.6	1:34.0	1:34.0	+2.8
9	22	(United States) Phil Hill	Cooper-Climax	1:37.1	1:34.8	1:34.9	+3.6
10	4	(Italy) Lorenzo Bandini	Ferrari	1:36.6	1:35.4	1:35.0	+3.8
11	34	(United Kingdom) Bob Anderson	Brabham-Climax	1:38.2	1:36.8	1:35.4	+4.2
12	26	(Sweden) Jo Bonnier	Brabham-BRM	1:37.1	1:38.2	1:35.4	+4.2
13	10	(New Zealand) Chris Amon	Lotus-BRM	1:35.9	1:35.9	1:35.9	+4.7
14	12	(United Kingdom) Mike Hailwood	Lotus-BRM	1:36.1	1:37.6	No time	+4.9
15	30	(South Africa) Tony Maggs	BRM	1:41.7	1:37.6	1:37.0	+5.8
16	32	(Italy) Giancarlo Baghetti	BRM	1:38.3	1:39.2	1:38.0	+6.8
17	28	(Netherlands) Carel Godin de Beaufort	Porsche	No time	1:39.9	No time	+8.7
18	36	(Switzerland) Jo Siffert	Brabham-BRM	No time	No time	1:44.0	+12.8

=== Race ===
Pos	No	Driver	Constructor	Laps	Time/Retired	Grid	Points
1	18	(United Kingdom) Jim Clark	Lotus-Climax	80	2:07:35.4	2	9
2	2	(United Kingdom) John Surtees	Ferrari	80	+ 53.6	4	6
3	20	(United Kingdom) Peter Arundell	Lotus-Climax	79	+ 1 lap	6	4
4	6	(United Kingdom) Graham Hill	BRM	79	+ 1 lap	3	3
5	10	(New Zealand) Chris Amon	Lotus-BRM	79	+ 1 lap	13	2
6	34	(United Kingdom) Bob Anderson	Brabham-Climax	78	+ 2 laps	11	1
7	24	(New Zealand) Bruce McLaren	Cooper-Climax	78	+ 2 laps	5	
8	22	(United States) Phil Hill	Cooper-Climax	76	+ 4 laps	9	
9	26	(Sweden) Jo Bonnier	Brabham-BRM	76	+ 4 laps	12	
10	32	(Italy) Giancarlo Baghetti	BRM	74	+ 6 laps	16	
11	8	(United States) Richie Ginther	BRM	64	+ 16 laps	8	
12	12	(United Kingdom) Mike Hailwood	Lotus-BRM	57	Differential	14	
13	36	(Switzerland) Jo Siffert	Brabham-BRM	55	+ 25 laps	18	
Ret	14	(Australia) Jack Brabham	Brabham-Climax	44	Ignition	7	
Ret	16	(United States) Dan Gurney	Brabham-Climax	23	Steering	1	
Ret	4	(Italy) Lorenzo Bandini	Ferrari	20	Ignition	10	
Ret	28	(Netherlands) Carel Godin de Beaufort	Porsche	8	Engine	17	
DNS	30	(South Africa) Tony Maggs	BRM		Practice accident	(15)	

== Notes ==
- This was the 100th Formula One World Championship race for an American driver. In those 100 races, Americans had won 15 races, had achieved 76 podiums, 19 pole positions, 20 fastest laps and 1 World Championship.
- This race marked the first pole position for the Brabham team.

== Championship standings after the race ==
Drivers' Championship standings

	Pos	Driver	Points
	1	(United Kingdom) Graham Hill	12
2	2	(United Kingdom) Jim Clark	12
	3	(United Kingdom) Peter Arundell	8
2	4	(United States) Richie Ginther	6
6	5	(United Kingdom) John Surtees	6

Constructors' Championship standings

	Pos	Constructor	Points
1	1	(United Kingdom) Lotus-Climax	13
1	2	(United Kingdom) BRM	12
3	3	(Italy) Ferrari	6
	4	(United Kingdom) Lotus-BRM	3
2	5	(United Kingdom) Cooper-Climax	2

- Notes: Only the top five positions are included for both sets of standings.

Previous race: 1964 Monaco Grand Prix	FIA Formula One World Championship; 1964 season	Next race: 1964 Belgian Grand Prix
Previous race: 1963 Dutch Grand Prix	Dutch Grand Prix	Next race: 1965 Dutch Grand Prix
