= Honda RA099 =

Prototype Formula One racing car

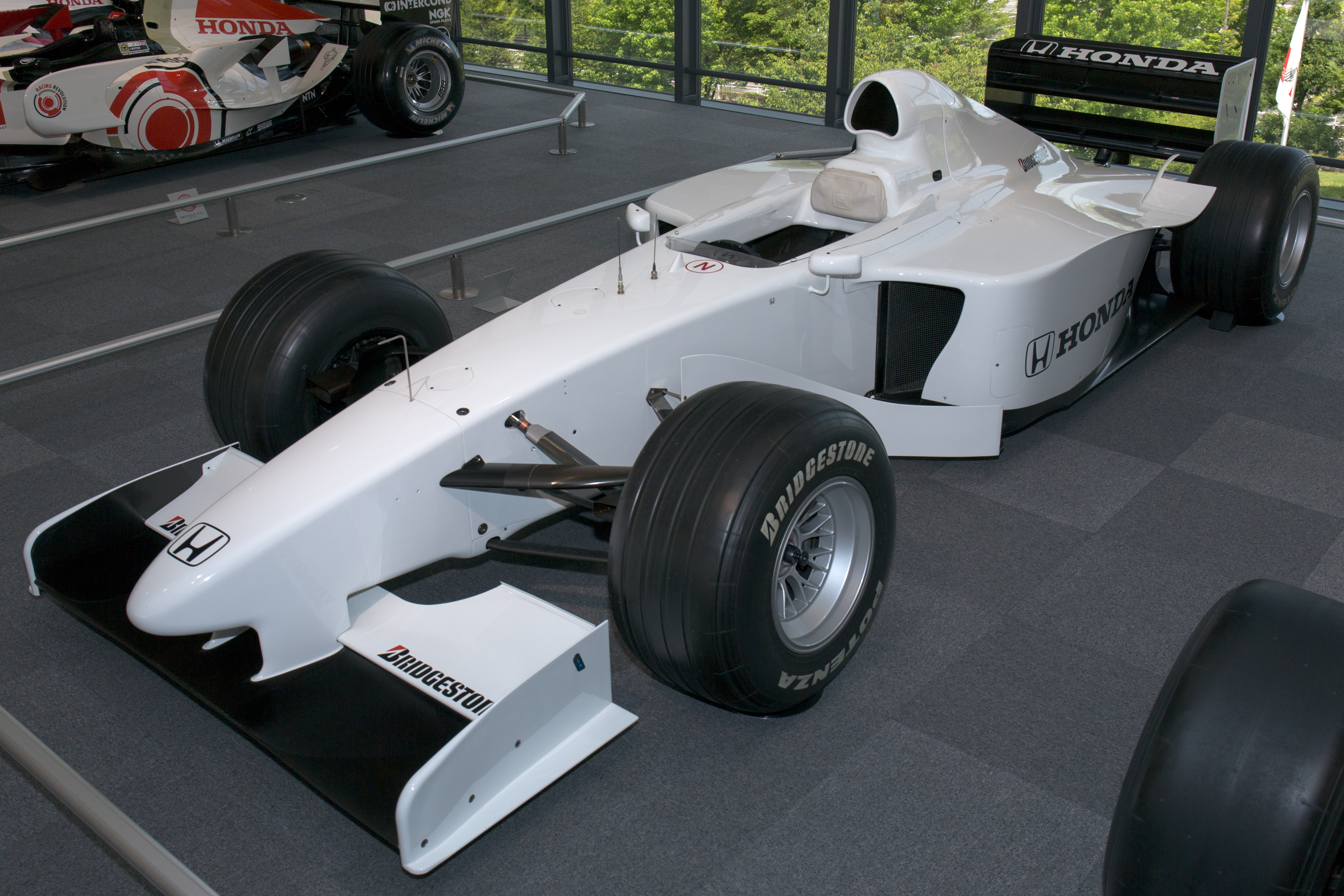
- Category: Formula One
- Constructor: Honda (constructor), Dallara (manufacturer)
- Designers: (United Kingdom) Harvey Postlethwaite (United Kingdom) Tim Densham

Technical specifications
- Chassis: Carbon fiber monocoque
- Suspension (front): Push-rod Double wishbone
- Suspension (rear): Push-rod Double wishbone
- Length: 4,500 mm (177.2 in)
- Width: 1,800 mm (70.9 in)
- Height: 950 mm (37.4 in)
- Axle track: Front : 1,480 mm (58.3 in); Rear : 1,400 mm (55.1 in)
- Wheelbase: 3,020 mm (118.9 in)
- Engine: Mugen Honda MF301HD 3,000 cc (183.1 cu in) V10 (72°). Naturally-aspirated, mid-mounted.
- Transmission: Honda 6 forward speeds + 1 reverse sequential semi-automatic
- Power: 725–790 hp (540.6–589.1 kW) @ 16,000-16,500 rpm
- Weight: 605 kg (1,333.8 lb)
- Tyres: Bridgestone Potenza; BBS Wheels

Competition history
- Notable drivers: (Netherlands) Jos Verstappen
- Debut: N/A (completed in 1999)
Entries	Races	Wins	Podiums
0	0	0	0
Poles	F/Laps		
0	0		
- Constructors' Championships: 0
- Drivers' Championships: 0

The Honda RA099 was a prototype Formula One racecar, commissioned by Honda, designed by ex-Ferrari and Tyrrell designer Harvey Postlethwaite and built by Dallara in 1999. Its purpose was similar to the one surrounding the Toyota TF101 of 2001, in that it was supposed to be a working test car used in preparation for a full-scale assault on Grand Prix racing in the following years.

The RA099 was designed in a few months by former Tyrrell Racing employees who joined Honda after the takeover of their team by British American Racing. The single-seater made its first laps on 15 December 1998 on the Italian circuit of Varano de' Melegari, then participated, alongside the other Formula One teams, in the 1999 winter tests where it stood out for its reliability and good performance.

While Honda expressed reservations about its commitment as a constructor, Harvey Postlethwaite succumbed to a heart attack in mid-April 1999 during a test session at the Circuit de Barcelona-Catalunya. On 21 May 1999, Honda abandoned its Formula One team, preferring to partner with British American Racing, which became its works team through the exclusive supply of Honda engines and a technical partnership concerning the development of the British team's single-seaters. The engine manufacturer Supertec, owned by Bernie Ecclestone and Flavio Briatore, then unsuccessfully considered taking over Honda Racing Developments to enter under its own name in Formula One.

== Background and development ==
=== Honda, a constructor engaged in Formula One in the 1960s ===
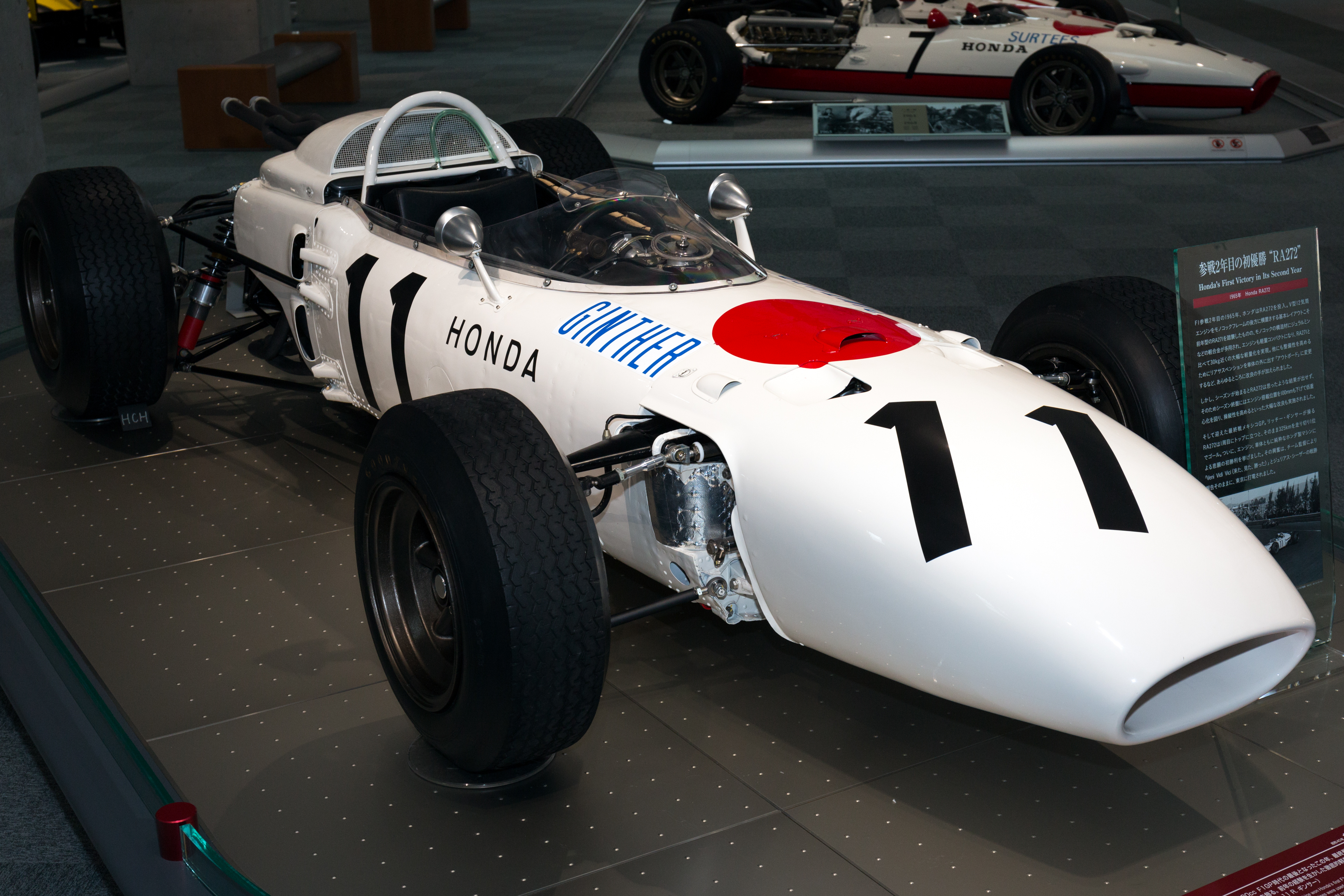
The Honda RA272, in the hands of Richie Ginther, won Honda's first victory in Formula One history at the 1965 Mexican Grand Prix.

Soichiro Honda, the founding president, who dreamed that one of his cars would one day become world champion in a global motorsport category and whose brand already enjoyed worldwide notoriety for its motorcycles, decided to enter Formula One, a motorsport then centered on Europe and poorly known to the Japanese, to promote its offensive on the automobile market. To prepare, the manufacturer acquired a 2.5 L (0.55 imp gal; 0.66 US gal) Climax engine to study it with a view to building its own engine. Initially, Honda wanted to enter Formula One as an engine supplier; contacts were made with Lotus, one of the best teams on the grid. While the Lotus-Honda project appeared very advanced, Colin Chapman suddenly broke off negotiations at the beginning of 1964. As a result, Honda decided to design its own chassis. The employees of the Honda Research Center, behind the Honda RA271 equipped with a V12 engine, were indeed convinced that their creation was capable of winning Grands Prix.

In the 1964 season, the Honda RA271 driven by Ronnie Bucknum failed to finish any of the four Grands Prix in which it was entered. The following year, two Honda RA272s were entered in the championship, which put the Japanese team's staff under severe strain. Nevertheless, it managed to take advantage of the RA272's fuel injection system during the 1965 Mexican Grand Prix, held on the Mexico City circuit, located at altitude: Richie Ginther won Honda's first victory in Formula One history.

In the 1966 season, the RA273, an evolution of the RA272, proved unreliable. In the 1967 season, Honda subcontracted the design of a Formula One chassis to the British company Lola Cars to replace the RA273, which was far too heavy at 743 kg (1,638 lb), with a lighter chassis. From a single-seater intended to race in the USAC championship, Lola developed the Honda RA300, weighing only 600 kg (1,300 lb). The single-seater, nicknamed Hondola by the specialized press of the time, made a strong impression from its first race appearance at Monza during the 1967 Italian Grand Prix as John Surtees won Honda's second victory in Formula One. Honda and Lola ended their partnership in the 1968 season and the Japanese firm developed the RA301 alone, whose recurring reliability problems led Honda to interrupt the "first phase of its involvement in Formula One" and leave the discipline that same year. following the death of Jo Schlesser at the 1968 French Grand Prix at Rouen in a Honda RA302.

=== A winning engine supplier in the 1980s ===
Honda had to wait until the 1983 season to return to Formula One, but only as an engine supplier. Indeed, the cynical comments from discipline specialists arguing that the Hondolas were not true chassis built by Honda pushed the Japanese to focus on supplying engines to customer teams. Honda partnered with the modest Spirit Racing team by equipping its single-seaters with a V6 engine turbocharged engine that was merely an evolution of an engine victorious in Formula Two in the early 1980s.

Honda, whose ambitions in Formula One were growing, then turned to Williams. After three years of building up, Honda produced one of the best engines on the grid and enabled Williams to win the Constructors' World Championship in the 1986 and 1987 seasons. From the 1988 to 1992 seasons, Honda partnered with McLaren, which won four Constructors' Championships, from 1988 to the 1991 season. As an engine supplier, between 1984 and 1992, Honda won 68 Grand Prix, including two with the Lotus team, which it only supplied with older versions of engines provided to Williams in 1987 and 1988.

Nobuhiko Kawamoto, Honda's president at the time, stated that, despite the success with McLaren, the British team never understood the motivation driving the Japanese engine supplier to engage in Formula One: while McLaren aimed to win championships, Honda preferred to develop and improve its technology. This difference in philosophy and the fact that Formula One allowed Honda to address only a mostly European audience led Honda to end "its second phase of involvement in Formula One" at the end of the 1992 season to engage, in 1994, still as an engine supplier, in the American Champ Car championship, the United States representing a better market for the company.

=== Honda single-seater projects in the 1990s ===
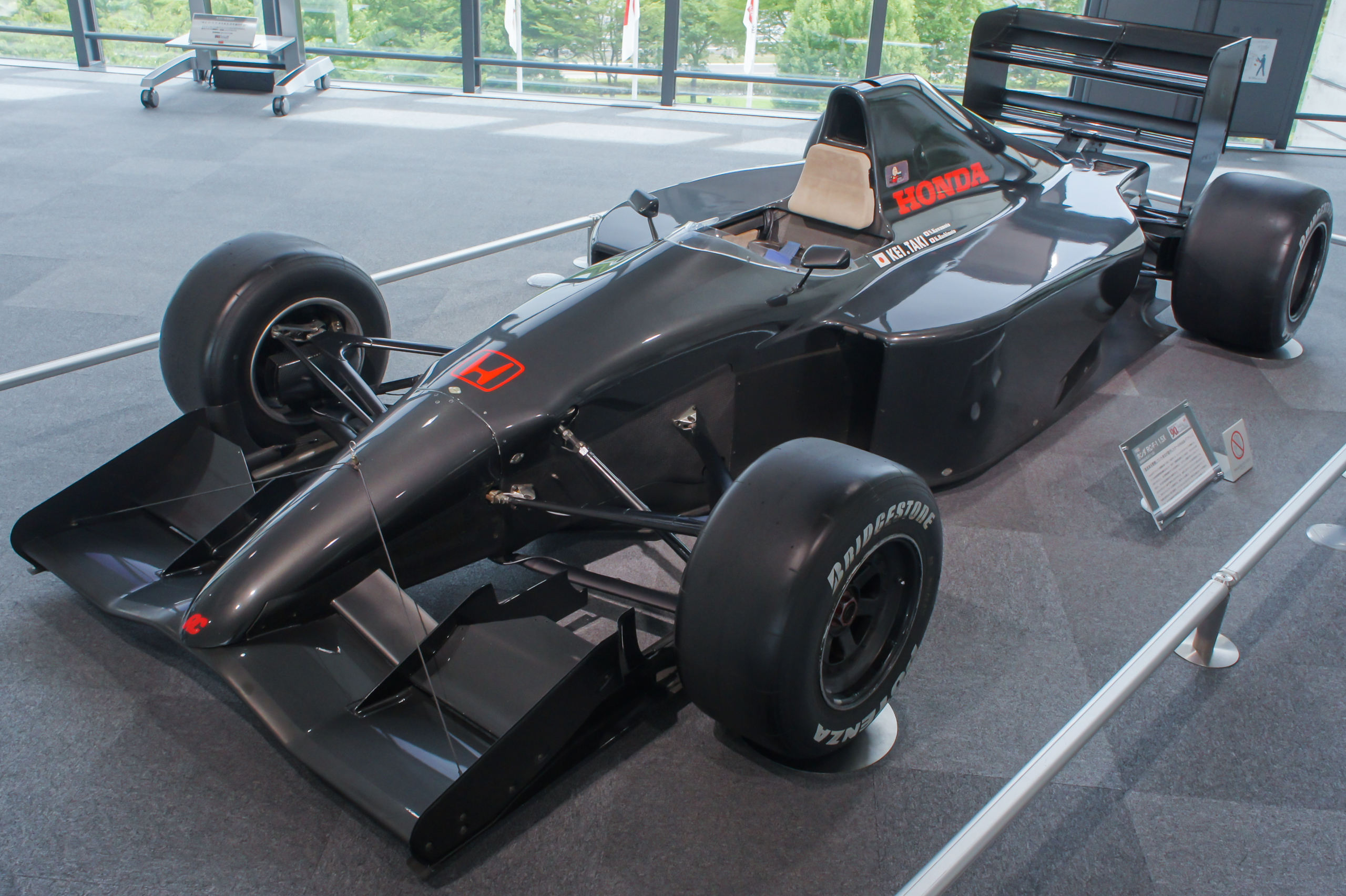
The Honda RC101, on display at the Honda Collection Hall.

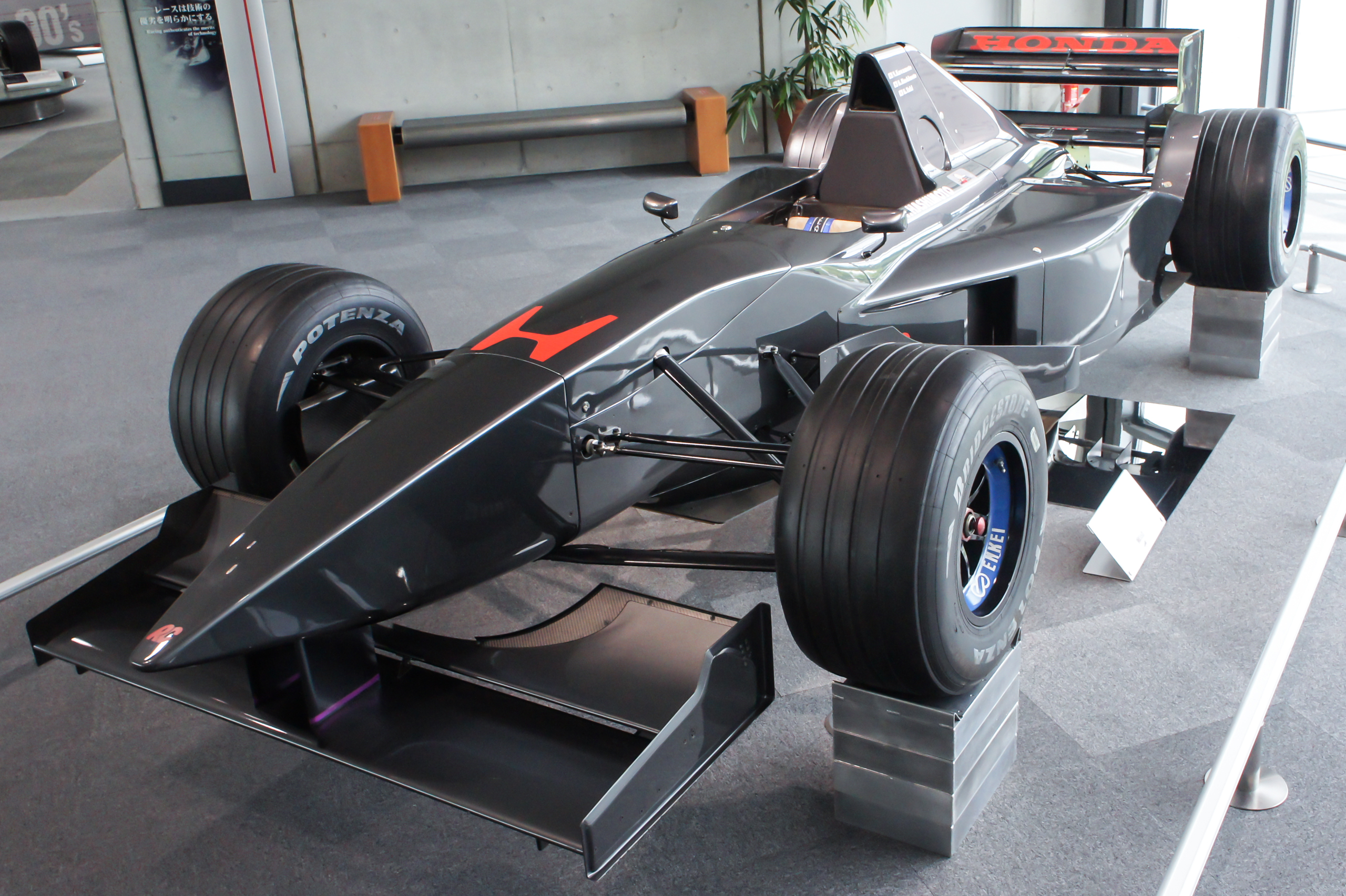
The Honda RC101B, on display at the Honda Collection Hall.

Nobuhiko Kawamoto believed that his company's long domination with its V12 engine meant that Formula One no longer represented a real technological challenge for its engineers. To strengthen their motivation and pay tribute to Soichiro Honda, who had since passed away, a study on building a Formula One single-seater was launched in 1991 under the direction of Ken Hashimoto and Keinosuke Taki, respectively project manager and development manager of Honda R&D in Tochigi, in partnership with Tokyo Institute of Technology and the engineering school of Yokohama National University, where the young Japanese manufacturer's engineers were trained. They carried out this project, financially supported by Honda, outside working hours: it was therefore not an official project.

Without access to data on the Formula One single-seaters competing in 1991, Honda's engineers designed the monocoque in carbon fiber and the suspensions of their single-seater, named RC100 (or Honda RC-F1 1.0X, chassis RC1-203) using analysis of their engineering calculations. The RC100 was covered in white paint (then nicknamed the "white crow" by its engineers) and deliberately likened to a Formula 3000 single-seater so as not to arouse suspicions from Formula One specialists about Honda's projects. Nevertheless, the RC100's wind tunnel tests did not satisfy the Japanese manufacturer.

From mid-1992, Honda R&D's young engineers reworked the RC101 chassis to improve it and bring it into compliance with the Formula One technical regulations in force for the 1993 season. Thus, the entire aerodynamics of the single-seater was redesigned, giving birth to the RC101B (or RC-F1 1.5X, chassis RC1B-101). The chassis was then tested in Tochigi and then on the Suzuka Circuit, owned by the Japanese manufacturer, by Kawamoto in person, fueling rumors that Honda was considering a return to Formula One from the 1994 season. In March 1993, the RC101 successfully passed an FIA-approved crash test, stipulating that the RC101 could have been entered in a Grand Prix.

While the RC101 was presented at Suzuka in January 1994, observers abandoned it after about fifteen minutes in favor of a second single-seater, unveiled simultaneously: the RC101B (or RC-F1 2.0X, chassis RC2-001). This one, slimmer than its predecessor, complied with the technical regulations in force for the 1994 season. However, the fatal accidents of Roland Ratzenberger and Ayrton Senna during the 1994 San Marino Grand Prix prompted the FIA to quickly modify the technical regulations, which Honda then applied to its RC101B, until 1996.

=== Towards a return as a constructor via Dome or Tyrrell for 1998 ===
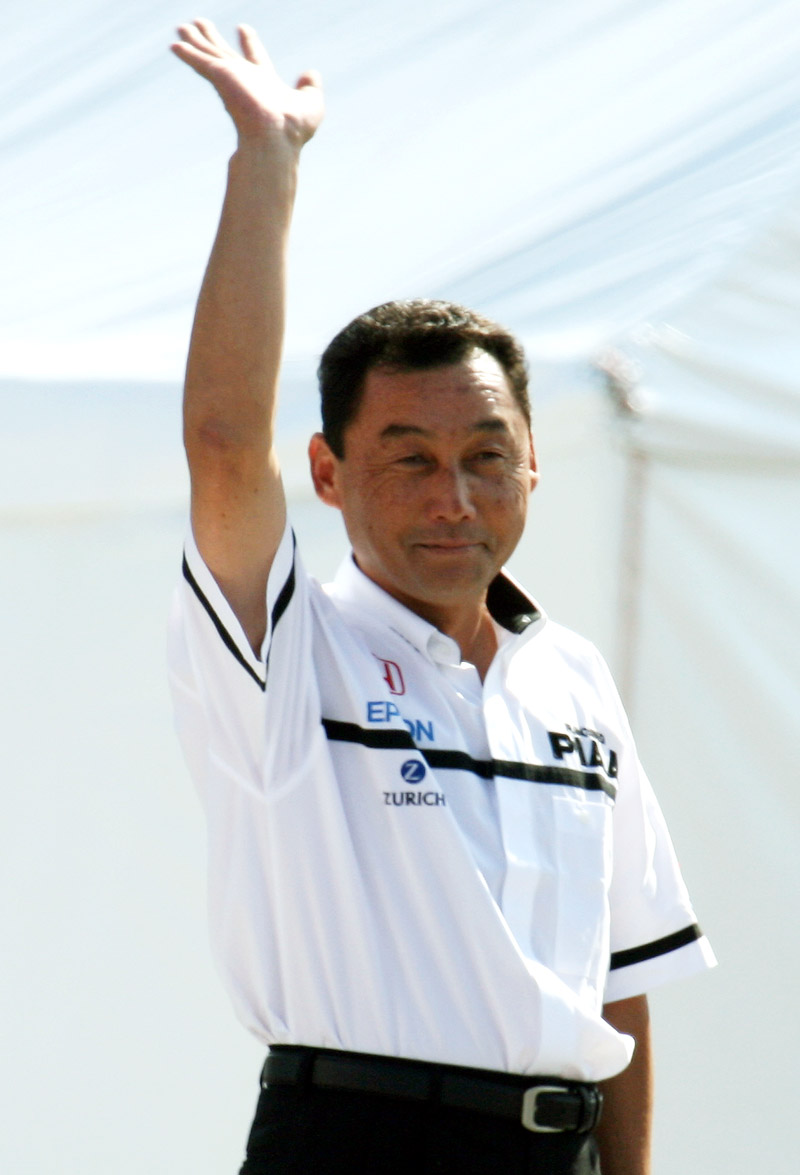
Former Formula One driver Satoru Nakajima (here in 2008) was tipped to head the new Honda team.

At the end of the 1995 season, it became clear that Nobuhiko Kawamoto, Honda's president, wanted his company to return to Formula One as a constructor by the 1998 season, one year after the arrival of tire manufacturer Bridgestone, which equipped the RC100 chassis. Honda also wanted to benefit from the experience gained by the Japanese constructor Dome, which was preparing its arrival in Formula One for the 1997 season, and which planned to conduct a year of testing with its F105, its prototype chassis powered by a Mugen-Honda V10 engine. Rumors announced that engineer Osamu Goto, behind Honda's success as an engine supplier in the 1980s and now head of the engine department at Scuderia Ferrari, would be in charge of Honda's return to Formula One.

In June 1996, Honda was heavily courted by various teams; the Italian company Benetton Formula sought to negotiate a sponsorship contract for Luca Cadalora, a Honda rider in the world speed motorcycle championship in the 500 cc (31 cu in) category, which would allow Flavio Briatore, the sporting director of Benetton Formula, to consider a subsequent engine supply from 1998, as their engine supplier Renault announced leaving Formula One at the end of the 1997 season. This agreement would also include a supply of Mugen-Honda engines to the French team Ligier (owned by Briatore) in which Toranosuke Takagi, Honda's protected Japanese driver, would be given a seat. At the same time, rumors claimed that Takagi and his mentor, former Formula One driver Satoru Nakajima (also supported by Honda), would buy the Tyrrell Racing team to make it, at a lower cost, the Japanese manufacturer's chassis department. Finally, Tom Walkinshaw, owner of the Arrows team, wanted to use his contract linking him with Bridgestone to obtain Honda engines from 1998. A less affirmed rumor evoked a partnership between Honda and Williams, the best team on the grid, which would allow the Japanese company to fight against Mercedes-Benz, Honda's main commercial rival, which supplied engines to McLaren. Another rumor, probably launched by Ron Dennis to disrupt negotiations between Honda and the other teams, announced an agreement between McLaren and Honda.

In October 1996, Nobuhiko Kawamoto announced that Honda was not ready for a return to Formula One in 1998. Japanese observers then believed that the Japanese manufacturer planned to support Dome, which had postponed its championship arrival to that same date, before taking full control when it was competitive, or that Honda would take shares in the Tyrrell team through Satoru Nakajima. This decision did not prevent Benetton, Arrows, and Tyrrell from continuing to negotiate for a supply of Mugen-Honda engines for the 1998 season.

=== An independent commitment in Formula One for 2000 ===
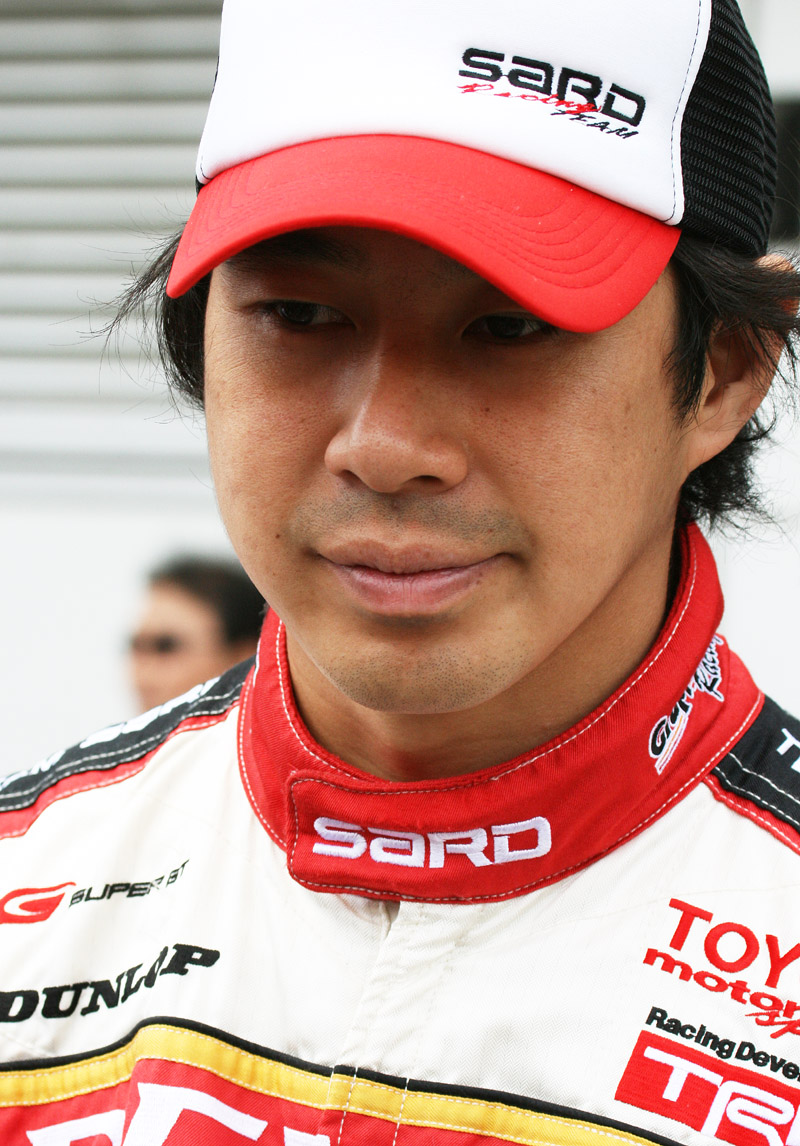
Tyrrell Racing driver Toranosuke Takagi (here in 2008), Nakajima and Honda's protégé, was to become the first driver of the new Honda team.

In July 1997, the Japanese specialized press reported that Honda was planning a return to Formula One for the 2000 season: the manufacturer had regained a good financial situation since its withdrawal from the discipline in the 1992 season and wanted to use Formula One to improve its production car sales in Europe. Moreover, the Irish team Jordan Grand Prix signed a contract with Mugen-Honda for the supply of V10 engines from 1998. The contract stipulated that these blocks would be designed by Honda and prepared by Mugen-Honda, the company run by Hirotoshi Honda, son of the Japanese manufacturer's founder, who owned 40%. However, both entities denied any synergy even though observers believed that Mugen-Honda's presence in Formula One was to allow Honda to prepare its return.

The engine supplied to Jordan was to be tested from autumn 1997 and Mugen was to make it as reliable and performant as possible so that Honda had an engine capable of winning Grands Prix upon its arrival in Formula One, especially since the manufacturer planned to supply the new British team of Craig Pollock (then linked to Honda) British American Racing (resulting from the takeover of Tyrrell) to enter Formula One in 1999.

In March 1998, Nobuhiko Kawamoto announced that his company was studying a five-year commitment in Formula One, from 1999 as a constructor and engine supplier; British American Racing would then be powered by rebadged Acura blocks. The latter could then be based near Heathrow Airport in London and the chassis was to be designed by Honda Research and Development in Wako, near Tokyo, in association with the Italian company Dallara, which was to produce the chassis parts. The new Honda Racing Developments team, some rumors reaffirming that it could be born from a takeover of Benetton Formula, would be chaired by Kawamoto while Satoru Nakajima would be its sporting director and Harvey Postlethwaite, a defector from Tyrrell Racing, its technical director. Rumors announced that the team would be sponsored by a major cigarette manufacturer, such as Camel or Imperial Tobacco, unless Toranosuke Takagi brought funds through Mild Seven. Shortly after, BAR announced a two-year partnership with Supertec, specialized in preparing old Renault blocks; Honda executives, such as Hirotoshi Honda, the boss of Mugen-Honda who viewed this constructor commitment unfavorably, tried to pressure Honda to abandon its team project.

At the end of December 1998, Yoshino officially announced Honda's return to Formula One to strengthen the manufacturer's sporting image worldwide and the creation of a full-fledged new team: he justified this decision by arguing that a partnership with an existing team, which has a different organization and culture from Honda, "would be difficult and slow down" the Japanese manufacturer's progress, which hoped to win victories by the 2003 season, without excluding the ambition of podium finishes from 2000. Honda announced the appointment of Harvey Postlethwaite and Rupert Manwaring to the technical management of the Honda Racing Developments team. Other executives from the former Tyrrell team joined the team, such as financial director George Koopman and team manager Steve Neilsen. However, part of Honda's management remained opposed to this commitment deemed costly and risky.

== Design of the single-seater ==
=== A chassis designed by Harvey Postlethwaite and built by Dallara ===
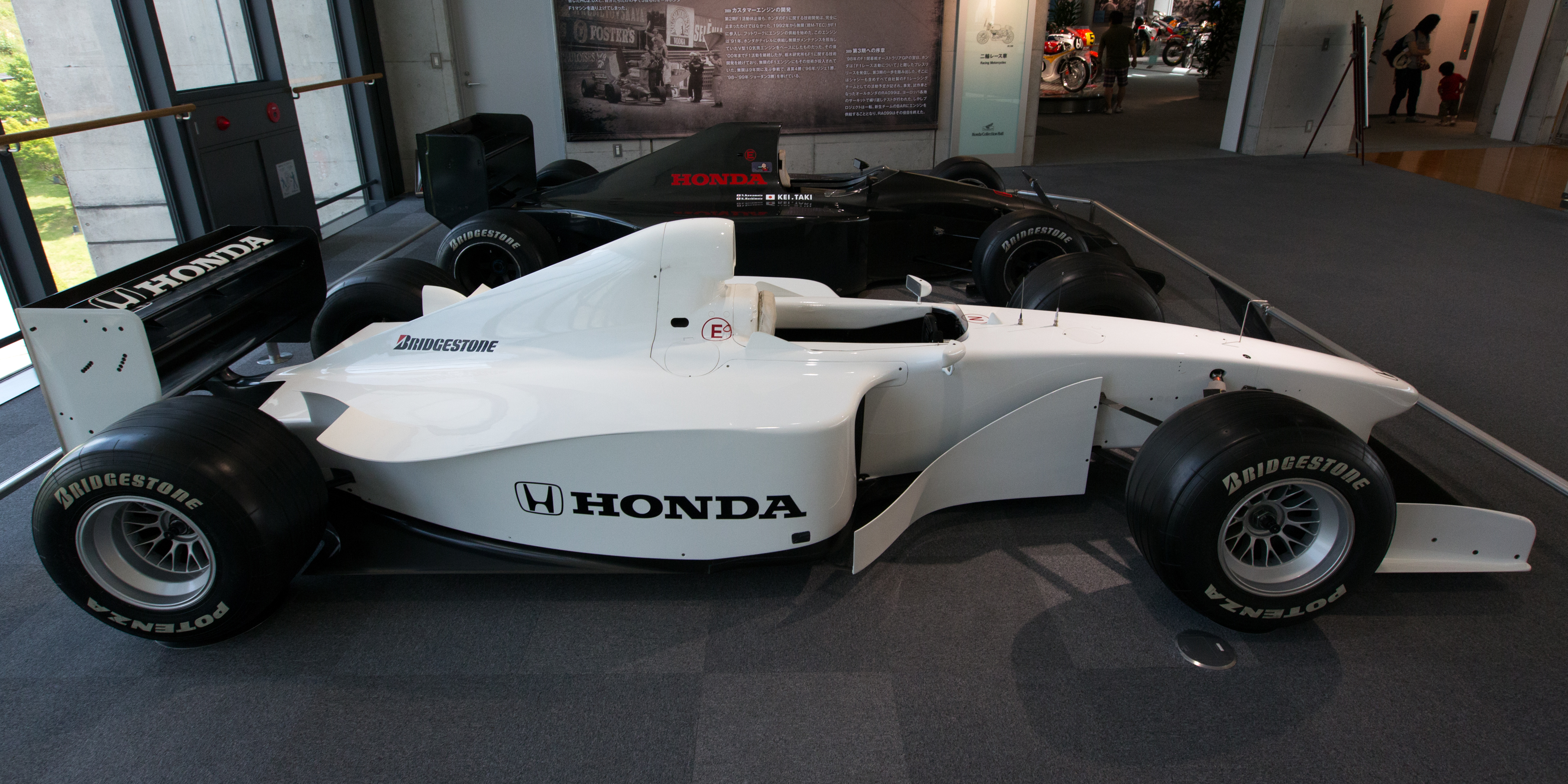
The Honda RA099 is built by Dallara while waiting for Honda to have sufficient infrastructure to build its own chassis in Europe.

From the 1998 season, the specialized press reported that a first single-seater prototype, built and tested in Japan, was experiencing delamination problems with the carbon fiber chassis. In March 1999, Honda, which did not have the necessary infrastructure in Europe to build a Formula One chassis, concluded a partnership with the Italian company Dallara to build a single-seater intended for testing in 1999 while waiting for the construction of a chassis by Honda for its arrival as a constructor in 2000, the latter preferring to first focus on manufacturing competitive engines. Honda recruited engineer Harvey Postlethwaite, Tyrrell's technical director, renowned for his design of performant chassis, to lead the development of the chassis built by Dallara. Postlethwaite was assisted by many former Tyrrell engineers who did not wish to remain within the new BAR team, especially since Honda, which had considered acquiring Tyrrell's factory and building an extension, set up its racing factory in Bracknell in the United Kingdom. Rumors also announced that Postlethwaite was to be assisted by Mike Gascoyne or Mike Coughlan, particularly for the construction of the chassis planned for 2000.

In autumn 1998, Honda Research and Development engineers based in Wako worked on designing a three-liter V12 engine intended for the single-seater planned for 2000. The experience gained from developing Mugen-Honda V10 engines would indeed allow engineers to design a V12 block of the same weight, or even lighter, with a lower center of gravity than the V10. Moreover, its higher rev range was to provide more power. Very quickly, the engineers focused on manufacturing a more traditional V10 engine.

=== Technical aspects ===
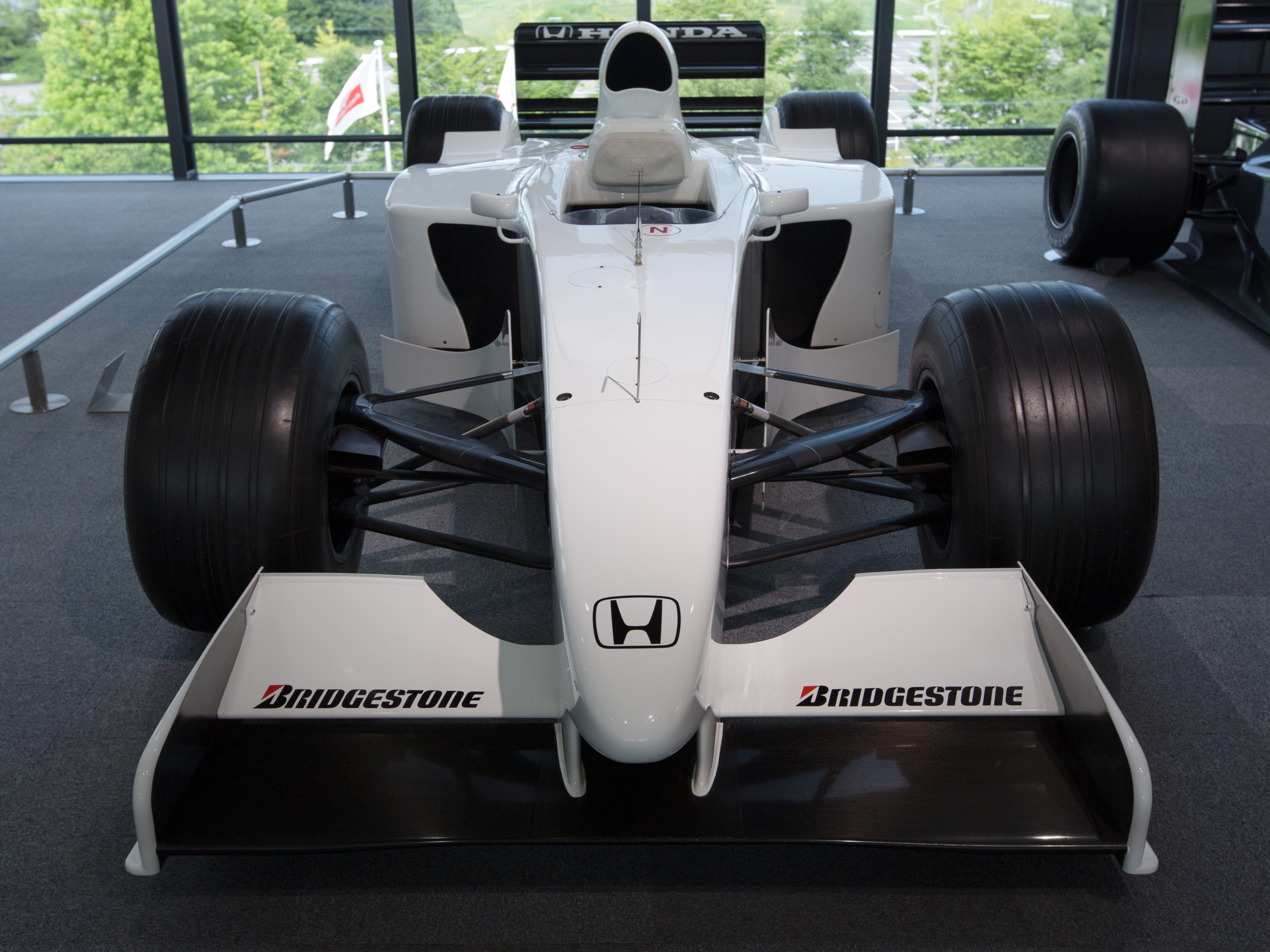
The Honda RA099 stands out for its simple aerodynamic elements.

In October 1998, the specialized press reported that four examples of the RA099 had been built. Two chassis (RA099-1 and RA099-2) remained in Europe to conduct track tests under Postlethwaite's direction while the other two (RA099-3 and RA099-4) were sent to Japan to test the engine and allow engineers to train in chassis design and aerodynamics before permanently settling in Bracknell to build the single-seater that would be entered in races. A first shakedown test was conducted on 15 December, in Italy, on the Varano circuit. A Japanese manufacturer spokesperson explained Honda's role in designing the RA099: "We are simply going to put an engine in it and see if it runs. It's not a Honda, let's call it a Honda prototype". Moreover, observers nicknamed the RA099 the Dallaronda, in reference to the Hondola of the 1960s.

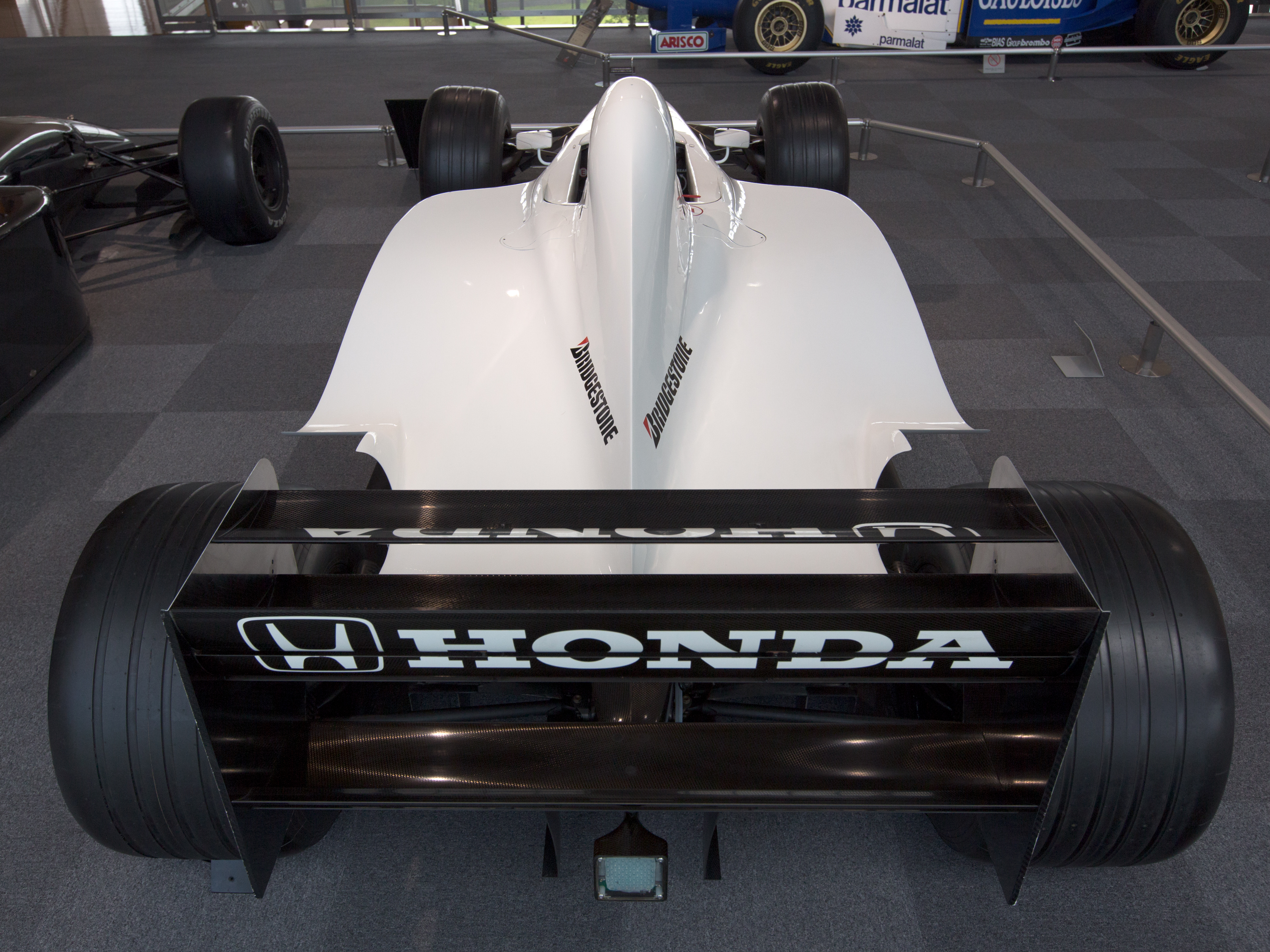
The Honda RA099, which is not considered a true Honda by the Japanese manufacturer, is nicknamed Dallaronda by observers.

Weighing 605 kg (1,334 lb) with its driver and 4,500 mm (180 in) long, the Honda RA099 features a monocoque in carbon fiber and a honeycomb structure. Its width is 1,800 mm (71 in), its height 950 mm (37 in), and its wheelbase 3,020 mm (119 in). It stands out for a simple architecture intended to receive aerodynamic improvements during tests.

The RA099 is powered by a Mugen-Honda MF-301HD V10 engine with a displacement of 2,998 cc (182.9 cu in) developing 680 hp (510 kW) at 15,000 rpm (250 Hz). Transmission is provided by a six-speed sequential gearbox developed by Honda. The suspensions adopt a classic structure and are connected to shock absorbers developed by Showa. The carbon brake discs are designed by AP Racing. The wheels are supplied by Enkei and the tires by Bridgestone.

== Driver choices ==
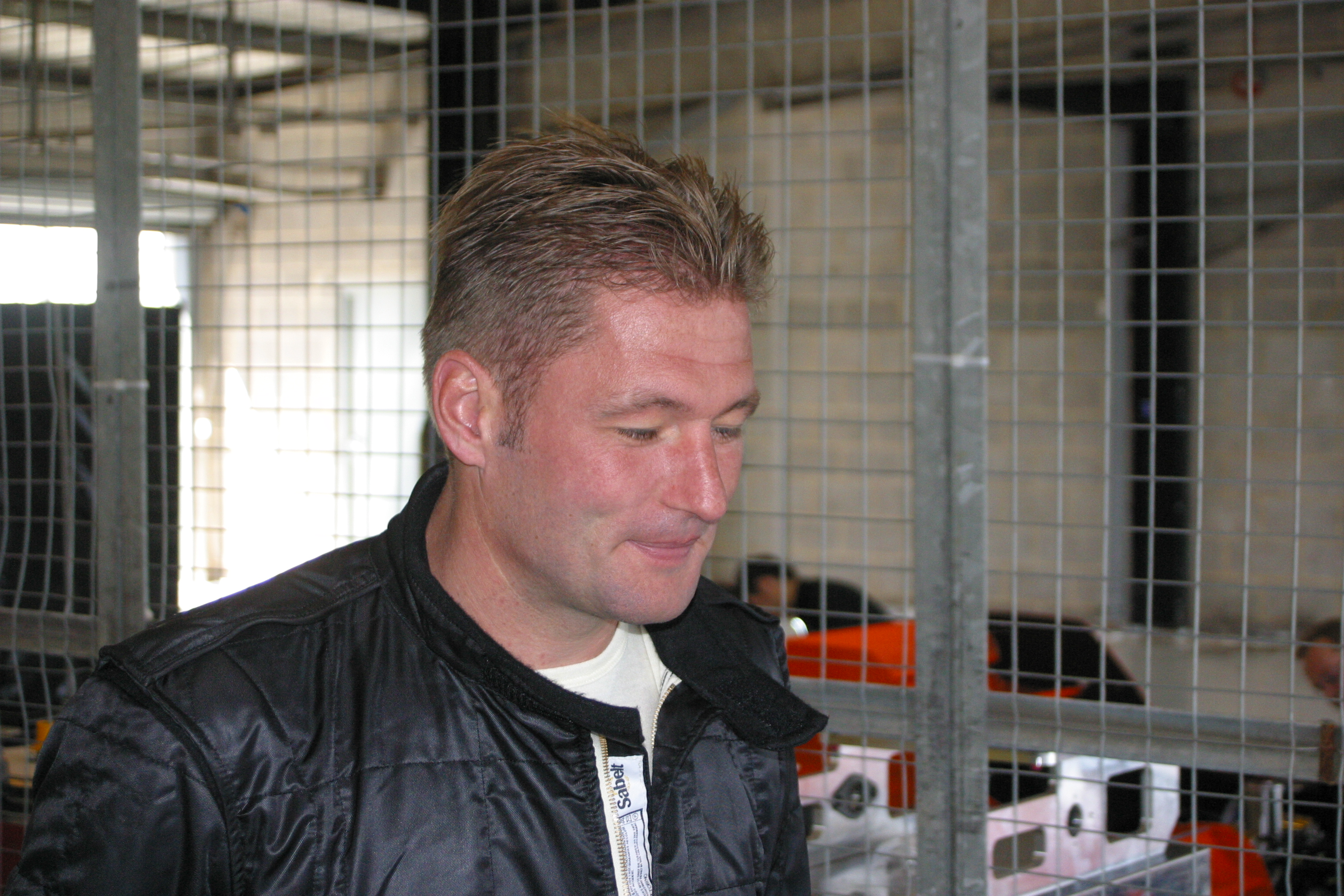
Jos Verstappen (here in 2005) joined Honda after his dismissal from Stewart Grand Prix.

From March 1998, it was said that the Japanese manufacturer would recruit Jacques Villeneuve, 1997 world champion, and Toranosuke Takagi, Tyrrell driver and Honda protégé, who could bring funds through the cigarette manufacturer Mild Seven and automotive equipment supplier PIAA. The Italian Alessandro Zanardi, CART driver whose Chip Ganassi Racing team is powered by Honda and Formula One driver between 1991 and 1994, and Johnny Herbert, Sauber driver who had already worked with Honda when he was a tester for Team Lotus in 1988, were also tipped. The postponement of Honda's commitment eliminated the Takagi track who joined Arrows for 1999, even if it was not excluded that he would find a seat at Honda in 2000.

In autumn 1998, Honda approached Arrows driver Mika Salo, who drove for Tyrrell between the 1995 and 1997 seasons, offering him a higher salary, but the Finn preferred to stay with the British team before joining British American Racing. Honda then planned to hire Satoshi Motoyama, the 1998 Formula Nippon champion, and the Dutchman Jos Verstappen, a Formula One driver since 1994 without a seat after his eviction from Stewart Grand Prix. Only Verstappen was recruited by Honda, for a three-year term; he stated: "Everyone knows Honda's reputation in Formula One, they settle for nothing less than winning. I am proud and I think it is a great honor that Honda chose me. I am therefore happy to join Honda as a driver for their first steps."

== The Honda RA099 in development tests ==
=== Impressive performances in winter tests ===
After two days of testing at the Mugello Circuit, in mid-January 1999, during which the RA099 wore a white and red livery reminiscent of Honda's 1960s livery, Jos Verstappen participated, between January 23 and 28, in a pre-season test session at the Circuito de Jerez alongside Benetton Formula, British American Racing, and Stewart Grand Prix. The Japanese single-seater wore an all-white livery, adorned with Honda and Bridgestone stickers.

On the first day, Jos Verstappen completed thirty laps and set the fastest time of the day in 1 min 26 s 580, beating the BAR 01 of Jacques Villeneuve, second, by 1.2 seconds (0.020 min). The next day, the Dutchman completed thirty-two laps and again led the session, with a best time in 1 min 26 s 027 and still a second ahead of Villeneuve. Verstappen also dominated the third day of testing with a similar time, beating the 01 of Ricardo Zonta by more than a second. On the fourth day, Verstappen improved further, in 1 min 25 s 18. The RA099's performances aroused suspicions from rival teams who thought it was running under the minimum authorized weight for advertising purposes, or even that it was illegal in its design. However, Honda Racing Developments members, almost all from Tyrrell Racing, were very satisfied with the RA099's debut, which seemed more performant than the BAR 01 designed by the new team resulting from Tyrrell's takeover. Verstappen praised the power, handling, and aerodynamics of the RA099, which he considered the best car he had ever driven.

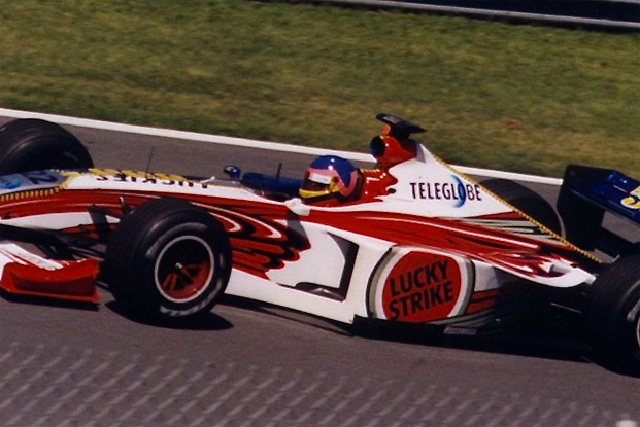
The Honda RA099 beat the BAR 01 during winter tests, considered the main rival of the RA099 by former Tyrrell Racing engineers working at Honda.

In early February, Honda went to the Circuit de Barcelona-Catalunya for three days to test the RA099 on long runs, alongside all the grid's teams. Over the entire session, Verstappen, using the two RA099 chassis present in Europe, completed 221 laps and set his best time in 1 min 26 s 915, 1.4 seconds (0.023 min) off the best performance set by the Prost AP02 of Jarno Trulli; he ranked thirteenth out of eighteen participants. The RA099 was considered fast and reliable by observers. Rival teams complaining that Honda was participating in pre-season tests alongside them, Bernie Ecclestone informed the Japanese team that it was no longer authorized and had to organize its own test program alone. Thus, at the end of March, Honda had to fall back on the Lurcy-Lévis circuit, which has a 1.5 km (0.93 mi) straight, located near the Circuit de Nevers Magny-Cours, to test the RA099 to improve its aerodynamics.

=== Reservations about a commitment to Formula One ===
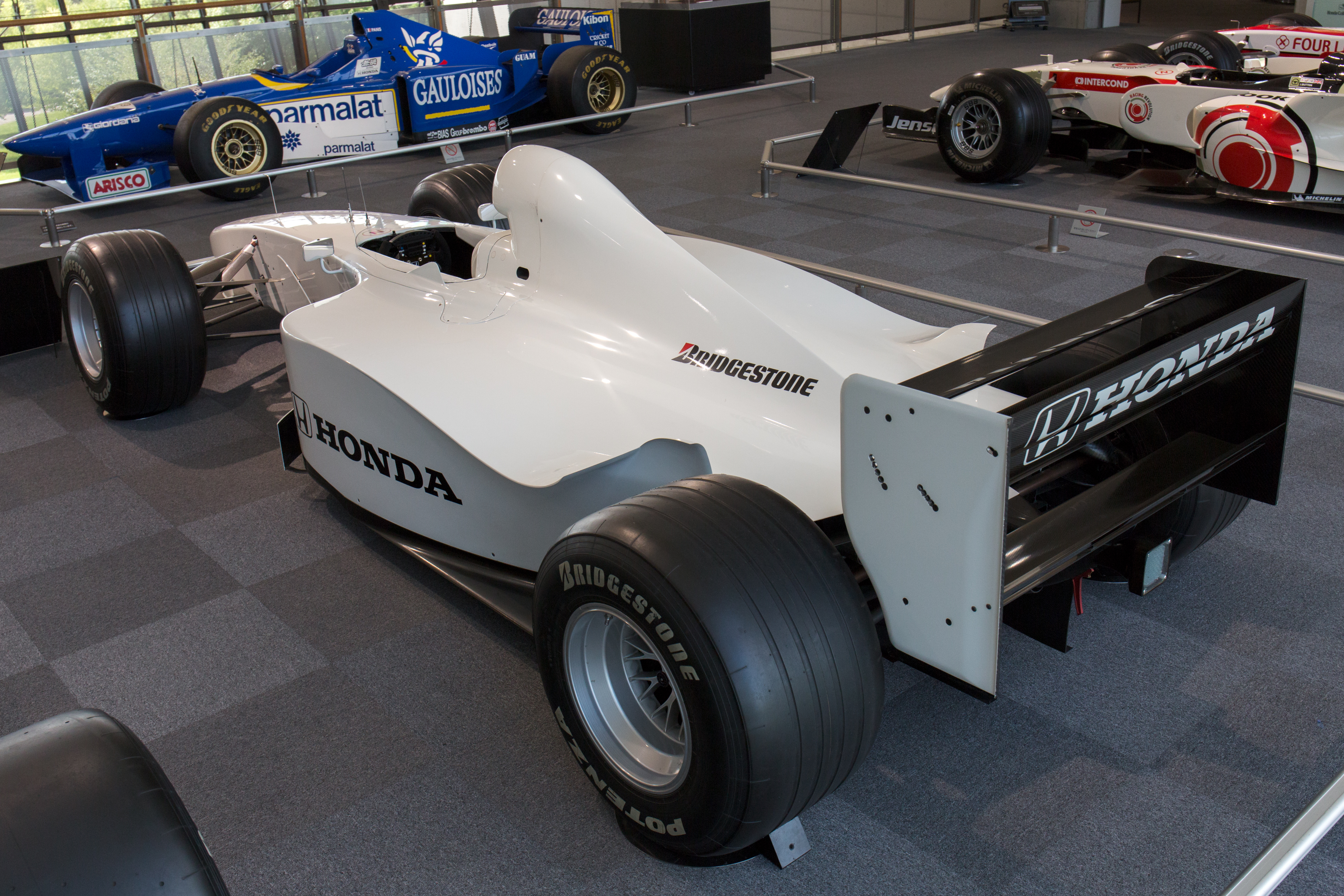
Harvey Postlethwaite planned to buy Honda Racing Developments in exchange for engine supply from Honda.

While Rupert Manwaring and Japanese Honda Racing Developments engineers went to the paddock of the 1999 Australian Grand Prix, the opening round of the 1999 season, the specialized press reported that Honda's board of directors was to consider granting a budget of 200 million per year for five years in favor of its Formula One team and the modernization of the Bracknell factory, which then employed 120 people. Honda denied discussing any budget, especially since Mugen-Honda wanted its parent company to prioritize its engine projects. Rumors also returned about a possible takeover of Jordan Grand Prix supplied with engines by Mugen-Honda.

Many board members, including representatives from Honda North America, were increasingly reluctant to commit to Formula One, with investments deemed too high, especially since British American Racing, dissatisfied with Supertec blocks, was negotiating with Honda to become its works team from 2000, which would lead to the abandonment of Honda Racing Developments. Harvey Postlethwaite and the other members of the Japanese team's management then proposed buying 60% of Honda Racing Developments' shares to enter an independent team in the championship. The British engineer also requested Honda engine supply and suggested that the Japanese manufacturer buy back his team at cost price when it was ready to commit definitively to Formula One.

The next day, the test day was interrupted as Harvey Postlethwaite suffered chest pains. After returning to the hotel, he was admitted to the hospital where he succumbed, during the night, to a heart attack. Honda canceled the rest of the Barcelona tests as well as those in Jerez scheduled for late April.

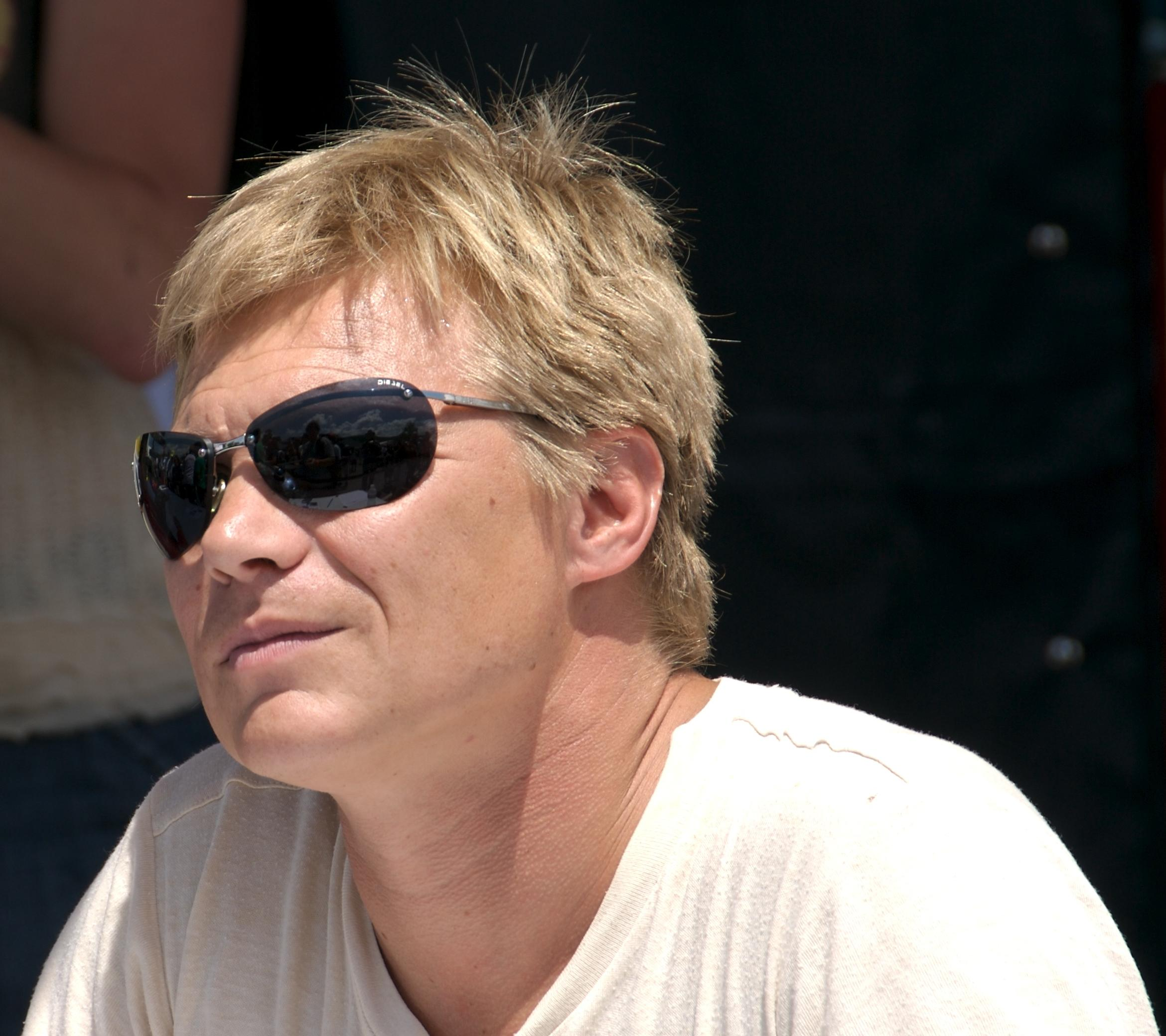
Mika Salo (here in 2007), present in Formula One since 1994, was to support Jos Verstappen from June 1999.

Postlethwaite's disappearance fueled rumors about Honda's immediate disengagement as a team, the manufacturer preferring to supply engines to Jordan Grand Prix and British American Racing for the 2000 season. Rupert Manwaring, who took interim management of Honda Racing Developments, however affirmed that the team was determined to continue the test program and that the RA099 was to be tested again at the Lurcy-Lévis circuit in early May 1999. Other speculations suggested that former Stewart Grand Prix technical director Alan Jenkins, who worked with Mugen-Honda when he was at Footwork in 1992 and 1993, could replace Postlethwaite as technical director of Honda Racing Developments. At the end of April, Finn Mika Salo announced having signed a test driver contract with Honda to test the RA099 alongside Jos Verstappen from June 1999, once his interim at British American Racing, where he replaced Ricardo Zonta, was completed.

At the same time, the specialized press reported that British American Racing had offered 60 million to Honda for engine supply for three years, which would lead to the end of Honda Racing Developments. This project was supported by Honda's American subsidiary and several members of the Japanese manufacturer's management preferred that the money to invest in Honda Racing Developments be used in production car lines in Japan. However, Honda having paid a 25 million deposit to reserve its place as the twelfth Formula One team, a withdrawal would oblige it to pay a heavy penalty to the Fédération Internationale de l'Automobile. Rumors also announced that Honda could sell the RA099 to British American Racing or entrust Honda Racing Developments to the British team by equipping both teams with its works engine. Ron Dennis, McLaren boss, was very critical of Honda, believing that the manufacturer's U-turn was not "behavior expected from a multinational company" which he judged "unprofessional". Indeed, the Concorde Agreements only authorize twelve teams to participate in the Formula One World Championship and reserving the last place for Honda forced the German team Zakspeed, present from 1985 to 1989, to abandon its return.

In mid-May, on the sidelines of the 1999 Monaco Grand Prix, Honda leaders discussed with Bernie Ecclestone the future of the Japanese manufacturer in Formula One while Max Mosley, FIA president, went to Honda's headquarters in Tokyo. Honda Racing Developments could be handed over to Ecclestone who would sell it to the highest bidder or engage in Formula One under its own name with Supertec engines. It was also suggested that Honda entrust the management of its team to Dome which would be powered by Mugen-Honda. This solution displeased Honda Racing Developments staff, very upset, who threatened to leave the team if it was retained.

=== Disappearance of Honda Racing Developments ===
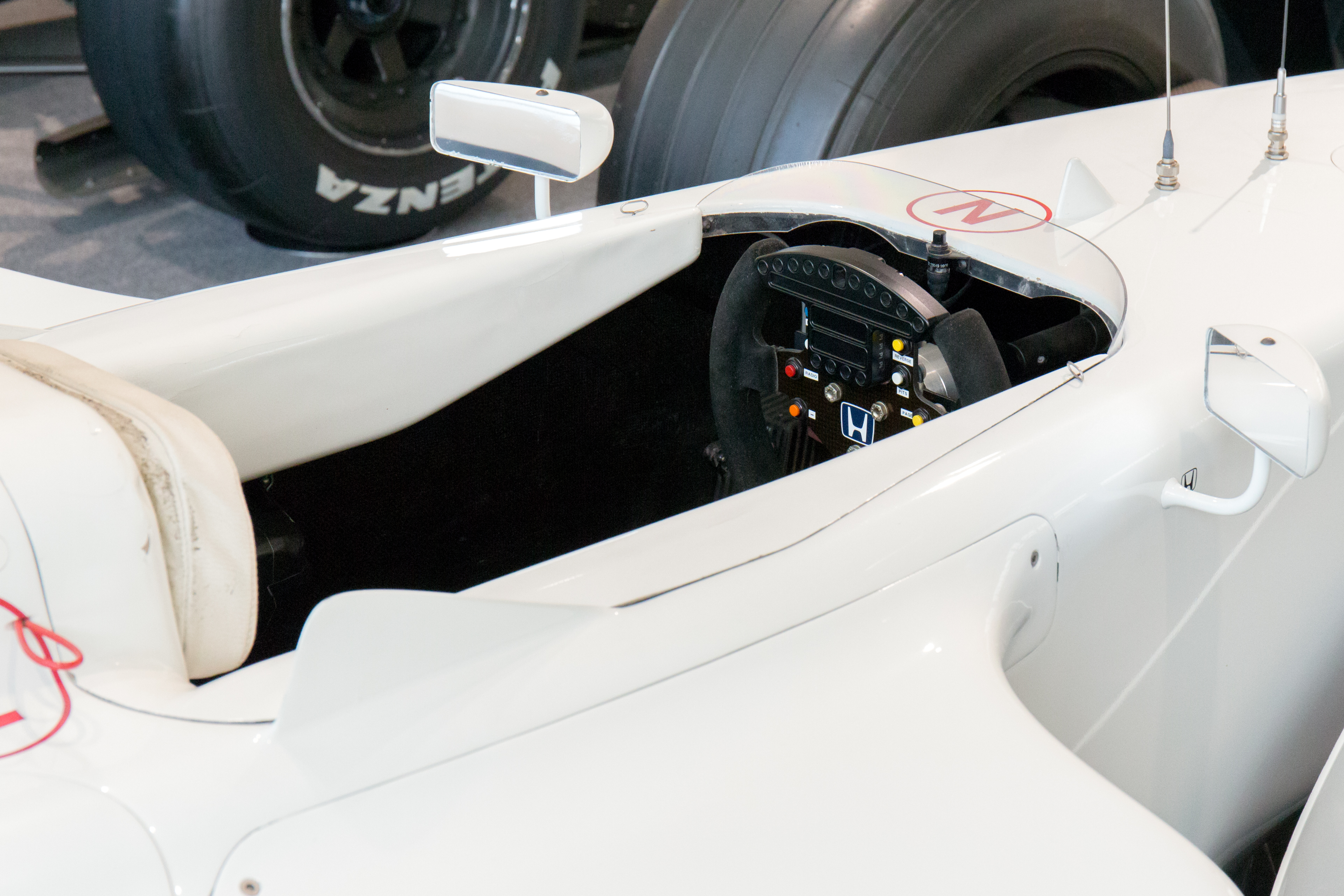
The cockpit of the Honda RA099.

On 19 May, Honda participated in three days of testing alongside the other Formula One teams at the Circuit de Barcelona-Catalunya; Jos Verstappen set, in 1 min 24 s 25, the sixth time out of twenty-one entrants, 1.5 seconds off the McLaren MP4/14 of Mika Häkkinen. While he was still on track, a board member went on site and ordered the immediate stop of tests, synonymous with killing the Honda project. Hiroyuki Yoshino justified this decision by arguing that Honda was more interested in race technology development than managing a Formula One team.

For Jos Verstappen, the end of the Honda program constituted "a huge disappointment, especially if we examine the competitive results we have achieved so far and the great potential we had. It is a period where I learned a lot and where I was very optimistic for the 2000 season." Moreover, Verstappen, always confined to a second driver role in the other teams for which he worked, was able to give his opinion on the development of the RA099 and thus improve the chassis performance. The Dutchman ultimately joined British American Racing as a test driver and was to conduct development tests of a new V12 engine designed by Honda.

At the end of May, Honda entrusted its racing team to Bernie Ecclestone who was to find a buyer. If Dome, Zakspeed, Lotus, and Jaguar seemed interested, the staff members had ceased all activity in the Bracknell factory. John Macdonald, former boss of the RAM Racing team, present in Formula One between 1976 and 1986 and friend of Ecclestone, considered the immediate takeover of the team which could enter the championship in 2000 with Supertec V10 engines, awaiting a lasting buyer. Flavio Briatore, Benetton boss and Supertec shareholder with Ecclestone, also planned, for a time, to take over the team.

== Fate of the single-seaters ==
Dallara built a total of six examples of the RA099, four of which were functional. The RA099-3 chassis, restored, wears its white livery used during development tests and is on display at the Honda Collection Hall on the Japanese Twin Ring Motegi circuit. The Bracknell facilities, still owned by Honda, would still house four RA099s, including two bare chassis.

== Bibliography ==
- Collins, Sam (2007). Unraced… Formula One's lost cars. Éditions Veloce Publishing.
