= Honda RA271 =

Formula One racing car

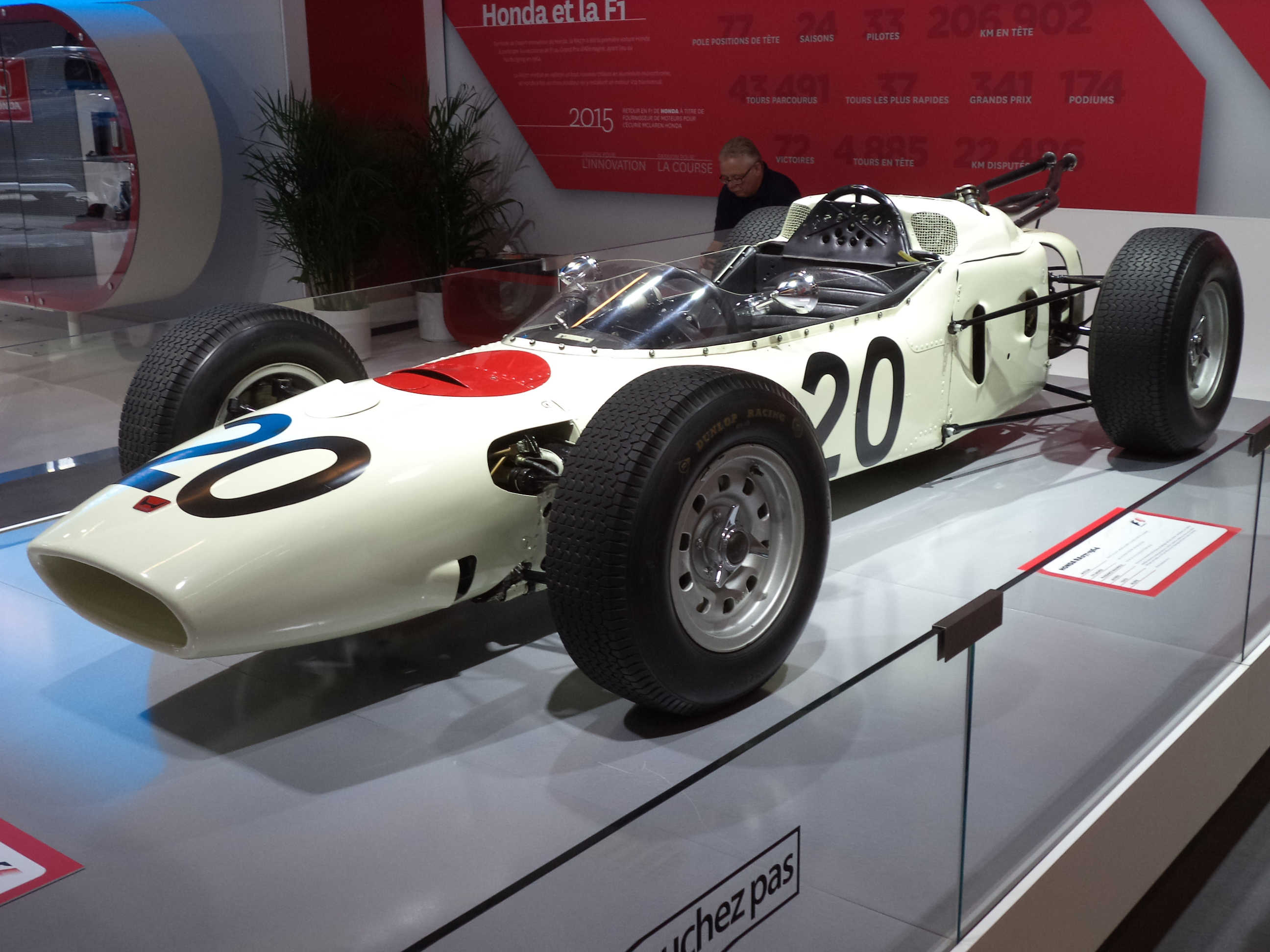
- The RA271 on display at the 2015 Montreal International Auto Show
- Category: Formula One
- Constructor: Honda Motor Co., Ltd.
- Designers: Yoshio Nakamura; Shoichi Sano
- Predecessor: RA270
- Successor: RA272

Technical specifications
- Chassis: Aluminium monocoque with tubular rear subframe.
- Suspension (front): Double wishbone, with inboard coilover spring/damper units.
- Suspension (rear): As front.
- Axle track: F: 1,300 mm (51 in); R: 1,350 mm (53 in)
- Wheelbase: 2,300 mm (91 in)
- Engine: Honda 1,495 cc (91.2 cu in) 60° V12, naturally aspirated. Transverse, mid-mounted.
- Transmission: Honda 6-speed manual transmission.
- Weight: 525 kg (1,157 lb)
- Fuel: BP
- Tyres: Dunlop

Competition history
- Notable entrants: Honda R&D Co.
- Notable drivers: (United States) Ronnie Bucknum
- Debut: 1964 German Grand Prix
- Last event: 1964 United States Grand Prix
Races	Wins	Poles	F/Laps
3	0	0	0
- Constructors' Championships: 0
- Drivers' Championships: 0
- Unless otherwise stated, all data refer to Formula One World Championship Grands Prix only.

The Honda RA271 was Honda's first Formula One racing car to enter a race. The chief engineer on the project was Yoshio Nakamura, with Tadashi Kume in charge of engine development. It was driven in three races during 1964 by American driver Ronnie Bucknum.

The car was developed from the company's 1963 prototype, retrospectively designated RA270. It was developed around Honda's revolutionary F1 engine, a 1.5 L V12, at a time when V8s dominated the F1 paddock, as constructed by BRM, Climax, Ferrari and ATS. The only other major manufacturer deviating from the received V8 wisdom were Ferrari, who experimented with both V6 and flat-12 layouts, although they ultimately elected to stick with their V8. No other manufacturers were running V12s at the time. The RA271 made its race debut during the 1964 Formula One season, just one year after Honda started producing road cars, and was the first Japanese-built car ever to enter a round of the FIA Formula One World Championship.

Only one RA271 was built. The car is currently on display in the Honda Collection Hall at the Twin Ring Motegi in Japan.

== Concept ==
The RA271 was created by Japanese development engineer Yoshio Nakamura, who had been with Honda since 1958 and had already worked as development project manager on the RA270 F1 prototype the previous year and the S360 sports car project, which was launched in 1962. The car was based on the RA270 prototype and was designed around the new Honda V12 engine, which was revolutionary in the sport at the time.

The regulations at the time stipulated a 1.5 L engine without supercharger, and the standard way of achieving this was using a V8. The Honda engineers, however, decided to use a V12 instead. In engineering terms, more cylinders generally allow smaller and lighter moving parts, higher rotational speeds and thus a greater peak power. It was these facts that the Honda engineers intended to exploit.

The car was constructed at Honda's facility in the Yaesu neighbourhood of Tokyo.

Although the RA271 only contested three 1964 Grands Prix, its innovative, transversely mounted, 1.5 L (92 cu in) V12 engine—sometimes cited as "the strongest engine of F1's 1.5-litre era"—formed the basis for the Honda's race-winning RA272 which allowed Richie Ginther to win the Mexican Grand Prix the following year.

== Chassis and suspension ==
The RA271 was constructed with an aluminium monocoque, a design pioneered by Colin Chapman and his Lotus team two years earlier and in use on his Lotus 25 and 33 models, which won world championships for Jim Clark in 1963 and 1965. This was still a fairly unusual concept, however, with other leading cars such as Brabham's BT11 and Ferrari's 156 F1 using an old fashioned tubular spaceframe set-up. However, a tubular rear subframe was employed to aid repair and maintenance. These combined left a car weighing around 525 kg, significantly over the minimum weight limit (450 kg). Its larger engine also meant it was significantly heavier than most of its rivals; the Ferrari 158 weighed just 468 kg.

When it was presented to the public, the RA271 was liveried in what was to become Honda's traditional racing colours: ivory coloured bodywork with a red rising sun on the cowling, easily marking Honda as representatives of Japan.

This bodywork covered the RA271's suspension, another feature pioneered by Chapman, this time on his Lotus 21 design. By 1964, Brabham were the only major competitor persisting with outboard suspension. Somewhat unusually, the RA271's front and rear suspension set-ups were identical. These consisted of a double wishbone set-up with inboard coilover spring and damper units. A double wishbone front set-up was fairly common, but the only other team using it on the rear was BRM for their P261 chassis, although this rear suspension was outboard. The car ran on 13″ Dunlop alloys both front and rear, with disc brakes also manufactured by Dunlop. The rear brakes were three sixteenths of an inch (5 mm) larger than the fronts.

== Engine and transmission ==
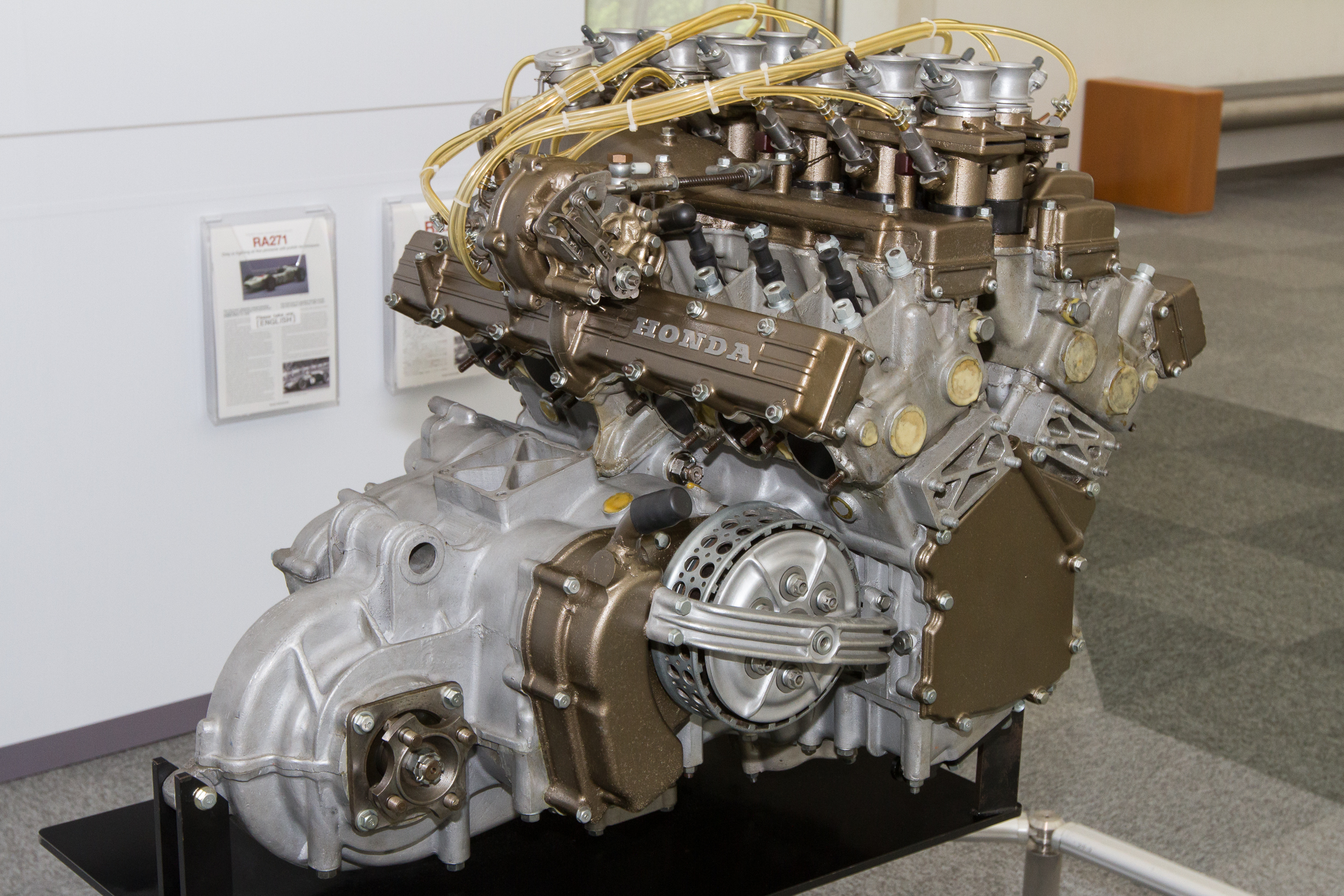
Engine and transaxle

Honda's F1 engine, the RA271E, was designed by Tadashi Kume and built in the same facility as the car, useful for design purposes. This was an advantage for teams such as Honda, Ferrari and Porsche, who built their engines in house, as opposed to others such as Brabham and Lotus, who bought theirs in from outside. The RA271E was a normally aspirated unit with twelve cylinders in a 'V' formation. The design featured twelve separate exhausts, six on each side of the body, which made the car very distinctive as opposed to the 'four-into-one' layout preferred by the V8 teams. The engine was water-cooled with nose-mounted radiators.

The engine dimensions of the 1965 48-valve V12 were 58.1 × 47.0 mm, 1,495.28 cc. Power output of 230 bhp (170 kW) at 13,000 rpm was quoted—this was the most powerful F1 engine of 1965. The engine was safe to 14,000 rpm. Since the 1967 4-cylinder 498.57 cc engine (57.5 × 48.0 mm) eventually gave almost 90 bhp (67 kW) at 12,600 rpm, the V12 had the potential of 270 bhp (200 kW) with further development. It used 12 Keihin carburetors, one for each cylinder, later to be replaced by low-pressure fuel injection before entry into the Italian GP.

Honda also built their own gearbox for the project, a six-speed sequential shift box.

== Racing history ==
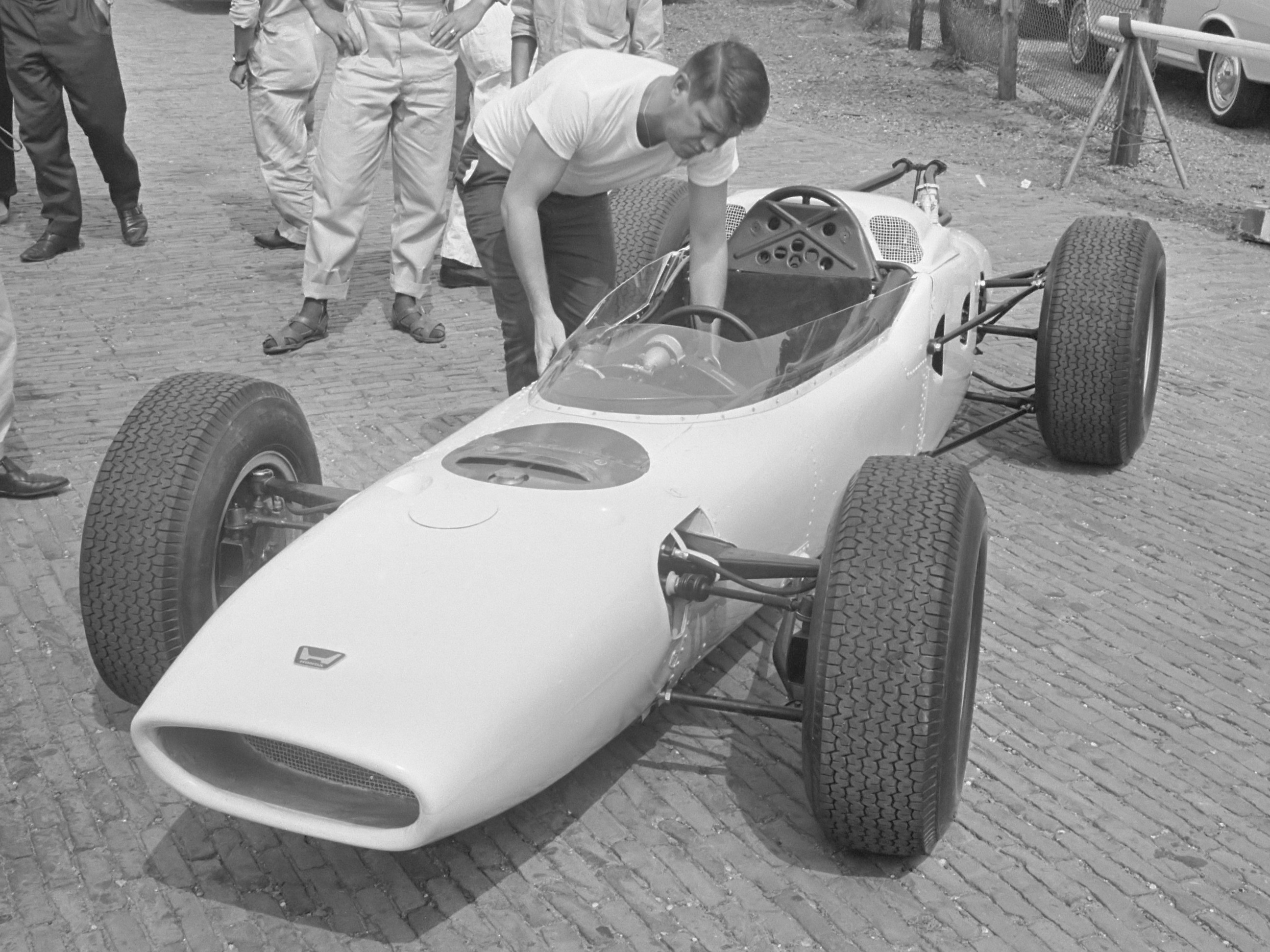
Circuit Park Zandvoort, July 21 1964, Ron Bucknum and his Honda (1964)

The car was initially entered for the Belgian Grand Prix at Spa-Francorchamps, but the car was not ready in time. The car actually competed for the first time at the German Grand Prix at the beginning of August.

As well as Honda's F1 debut, this race was also the debut for their American driver Ronnie Bucknum, and to make things even trickier the race took place on the daunting Nürburgring circuit, widely considered to be one of the most demanding in the world. Of the 24 entrants, only the fastest 22 would qualify. Bucknum was lucky to qualify as he ended the practice sessions third-slowest. The two non-qualifiers were the Scirocco-Climax of Belgian driver André Pilette, which was hopelessly off the pace, and Carel Godin de Beaufort, who was killed during the session in a tragic accident at the wheel of his privately entered Porsche 718. Bucknum was some 20 seconds slower than the next slowest competitor, Giancarlo Baghetti at the wheel of a BRM, and almost a minute off the pole time of John Surtees's Ferrari.

Despite a poor qualifying, Bucknum had a better race and consistently ran just outside the top ten throughout the race, ahead of many of the independent Lotus and BRM entrants. Despite a spin late in the race, allowing Richie Ginther's BRM to pass him, the reliability of the Honda allowed him to finish 13th as many of his rivals broke down (or crashed in Peter Revson's case), four laps behind winner Surtees.

The team then missed the Austrian Grand Prix before returning for the Italian Grand Prix at the iconic Autodromo Nazionale Monza. Bucknum's qualifying was greatly improved as he qualified 10th, ahead of the Brabham of double world champion Jack Brabham and comfortably clear of the mark required to qualify for the race as one of the 20 fastest drivers. He was only three seconds shy of Surtees, who was the pole sitter once again, and this marked a huge improvement for the Japanese team.

Although a poor start left him down in 16th, he quickly climbed through the field and ran as high as 7th before a brake failure forced him out of the race on lap 13. His ability to keep pace with the works BRM and Brabham cars in this race gave great hope for the future of Honda in F1.

The next race was the United States Grand Prix at Watkins Glen. As there were only 19 entrants, there was no threat of failing to qualify, and Bucknum was well within three seconds of Jim Clark's pole time for Lotus. The high quality of the field, however, meant that he was down in 14th place, although he did outqualify 1961 world champion Phil Hill, now driving for Cooper. He once again ran the race just outside the top ten, fighting for long periods with the Lotuses of Walt Hansgen (works) and Mike Hailwood (RPR) and Richie Ginther's BRM. However, on lap 51 a cylinder head gasket in one of the Honda's twelve cylinders failed, and Bucknum was out of the race.

This was to be the end of Honda's debut season, as they did not travel to the final race in Mexico City. The RA271 was replaced for 1965 by the RA272, so its best result remains 13th place at its debut race in Germany. Its best grid place was Bucknum's 10th place at Monza.

== Recent outings ==
The car's permanent residence is the Honda Collection Hall at the Twin Ring Motegi, but it has left there several times. It formed part of the Honda display at the 2006 Geneva Motor Show, along with two other F1 cars: the 1965 RA272 and the 2006 RA106.

== Complete Formula One results ==
(key)

Year	Entrant	Engine	Tyres	Drivers	1	2	3	4	5	6	7	8	9	10	Points	WCC
1964	Honda R&D Company	Honda V12	D		MON	NED	BEL	FRA	GBR	GER	AUT	ITA	USA	MEX	0	NC
1964	Honda R&D Company	Honda V12	D	Ronnie Bucknum			WD			13		Ret	Ret		0	NC
