= Honda RA272 =

Formula One racing car

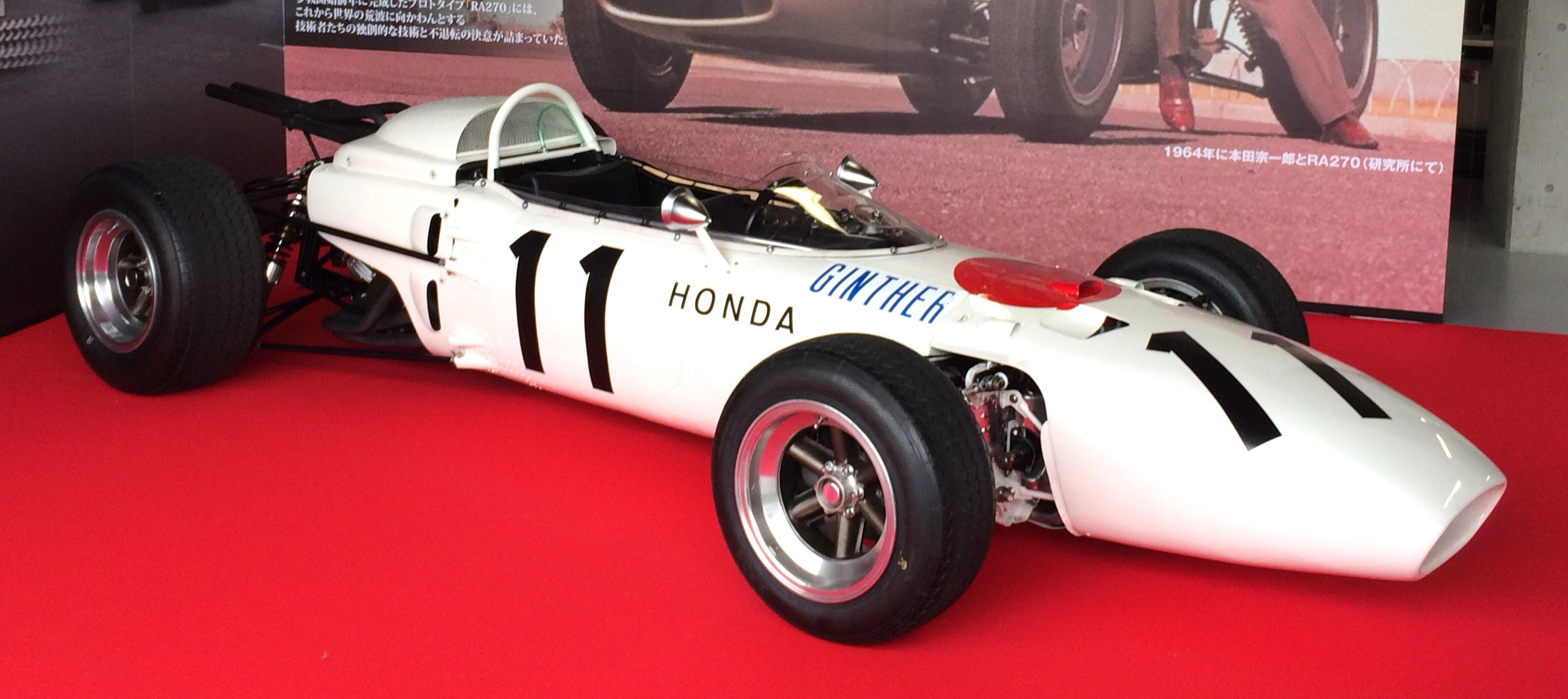
- Richie Ginther's RA272
- Category: Formula One
- Constructor: Honda
- Designers: Yoshio Nakamura; Shoichi Sano
- Predecessor: RA271
- Successor: RA273

Technical specifications
- Chassis: Aluminium monocoque
- Suspension (front): Double wishbone
- Suspension (rear): Double wishbone
- Length: 3,950 mm
- Width: 1,675 mm
- Height: 793 mm
- Wheelbase: 2,300 mm
- Engine: Honda RA272E 1.5 L (92 cu in) V12 (60°) naturally aspirated, mid-engined, transversely mounted
- Transmission: Honda 6 forward speeds + 1 reverse
- Weight: 498 kg (1,098 lb)
- Fuel: BP
- Lubricants: BP
- Tyres: Goodyear

Competition history
- Notable drivers: (United States) Ronnie Bucknum (United States) Richie Ginther
- Debut: 1965 Monaco Grand Prix
- First win: 1965 Mexican Grand Prix
- Last win: 1965 Mexican Grand Prix
- Last event: 1965 Mexican Grand Prix
Races	Wins	Poles	F/Laps
8	1	0	0

The Honda RA272 was a Formula One racing car designed by Yoshio Nakamura and Shoichi Sano for the 1965 Formula One season. It was the first Japanese car to win in Formula One, achieving victory at the 1965 Mexican Grand Prix after leading every lap with driver Richie Ginther. The win came just two years after Honda started producing road cars, and was the first of 89 victories for Honda-powered Formula One cars.

An evolution of the company's first car to enter Formula One, the previous year's RA271, the RA272 was noted for its technically advanced 1.5-litre V12 engine, designated the RA272E, which was the most powerful engine in the sport at the time. Besides the win in Mexico, the car also managed to qualify in the top three in four of the eight races it entered.

== Concept ==
As it was announced that the 1965 season would be the last for the 1.5-litre engines and new 3.0-litre regulations would come into effect in 1966, Honda decided to improve the previous year's RA271 model rather than develop a completely new car. The RA271's successor was named the RA272, and key areas on which its development was focused on included improving the engine's power output, decreasing weight and improving reliability. The "RA" in the name stands for Racing Automobile, "270" is said to come from an ultimate power target of 270 hp or a top speed of around 270 km/h, and the final digit "2" denotes that it is the company's second Formula One car.

The car's engine, designated RA272E, was a technically advanced (though rather wide and heavy) 48-valve 1,495.28 cc V12 engine (58.1 x 47.0 mm), which was water-cooled and transversely mounted in a rear-midship layout. According to Honda's official website, the engine gave 230 bhp (170 kW) between 11,500–12,000 rpm, and by the end of the season it was reportedly producing 240 bhp (180 kW). These figures were the highest of any engine in the 1.5-litre era, although the power band of the Honda engine wasn't as wide as some rivals. The engine was safe at 14,000 rpm for short periods of time, which was unusually high for a 1960s engine design. The V12 layout was unusual in the sport at the time, with most other manufacturers using V8 engines.

The RA271 weighed 525 kilograms, which was 75 kg higher than the minimum weight specified in the rules. To reduce this disadvantage, structural materials of the engine were changed and light alloys were used in the monocoque of the RA272, bringing the weight down to 498 kg, 27 kg less than the RA271. The aerodynamics of the RA272 were also more refined compared to the RA271. At the eighth round of the season in Italy, Honda introduced an updated version of the RA272 called the "RA272 Kai". This version had a lower centre of gravity, as the engine mount position was lowered by 100 mm and the engine's forward lean angle was increased from 12.5 degrees to 25 degrees. Cooling was also improved in the update with redesigned bodywork.

== Racing history ==
For their second season in 1965, Honda signed Richie Ginther to drive alongside fellow American Ronnie Bucknum. In contrast to the inexperienced Bucknum, Ginther had scored multiple podium finishes and gained a reputation for being a great test and development driver.

The car made its debut at the second round of the season in Monaco. The race ended in a double retirement as the cars suffered gearbox and transmission issues. Ginther qualified fourth at the next race in Belgium, and finished the race in sixth to give Honda their first points in Formula One.

The next race in France ended with ignition problems for both drivers, after a best qualifying position of seventh by Ginther. At the following British Grand Prix, Ginther qualified a strong third, just 0.5 seconds off pole position, but in the race he spun the car before injection issues caused a retirement.

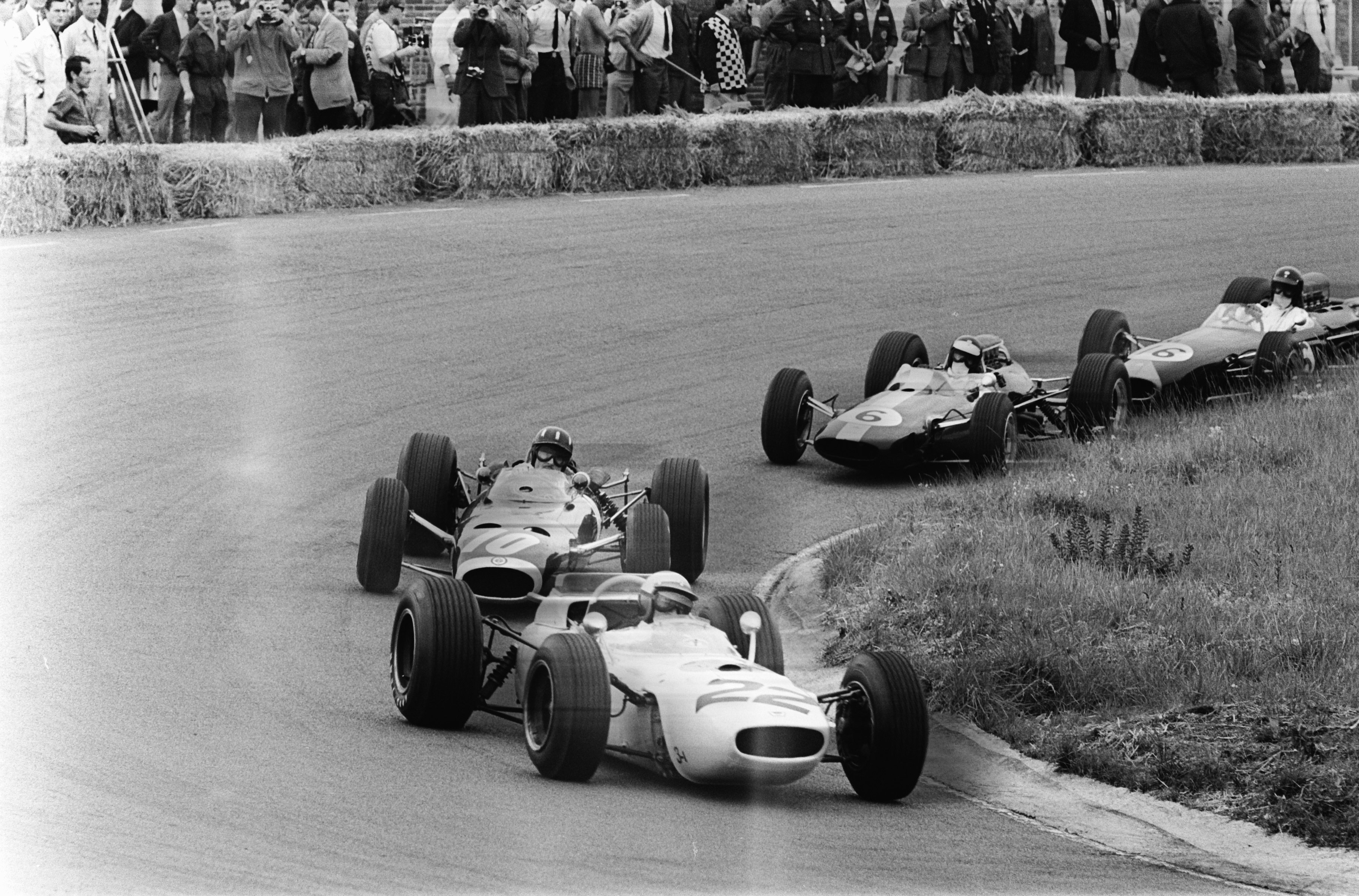
Ginther leading the Dutch Grand Prix

Ginther again qualified third at the Dutch Grand Prix, this time within three tenths of pole. He shot into the lead for the first two laps, but then spun twice, eventually finishing sixth to score more points.

The team didn't participate in the German Grand Prix as they were developing an updated version of the car, but returned for the next race in Italy with the updated cars. The race saw Bucknum return to the grid, as he had missed two races due to suffering a broken leg in a testing accident at Honda's Suzuka Circuit in Japan. He qualified sixth for the race – ahead of Ginther – but both cars retired from the race with ignition problems. Ginther qualified third in the United States Grand Prix, only 0.15 seconds away from pole, and finished the race in seventh.

The following Mexican Grand Prix, held at high altitude in Mexico City, was the last race of the season and the final race of the 1,500 cc era that began in 1961. Ginther once again qualified third, alongside Lotus' Jim Clark and Brabham's Dan Gurney in the top three, and immediately managed to pass both Clark and Gurney for the lead at the start of the race. Ginther continued to maintain the lead and held off his opponents, some of whom ran into car trouble: Clark retired with engine issues on lap nine, while Jack Brabham and BRM's Graham Hill encountered engine-related issues towards the end of the race. The RA272 ran without issues, and Ginther ultimately led all 65 laps to beat second-placed Gurney to the Grand Prix win. Bucknum finished fifth, ahead of the Ferraris and other cars, to make it a double points finish for the team. It was a historic moment, as it was the first ever Grand Prix victory for a Japanese car, engine, and team. It was the first of 89 Formula One wins for Honda-powered cars, and came only two years after the company started producing road cars. It was also tyre supplier Goodyear's first Formula One win. After the race, team manager Yoshio Nakamura sent the message "Veni, vidi, vici" to the Honda headquarters in Tokyo.

The Honda RA272E V12 had strong acceleration and often led the race into the opening lap after leaving the stationary starting grid. Despite not participating in every race, Honda finished their second season in Formula One sixth in the constructors' championship.

== Legacy ==
Honda's Type R cars traditionally have a Championship White paint option and a red Honda badge as a tribute to the RA272. The RA272 was inducted into the Japanese Automobile Hall of Fame in 2020, who called it "a historical car that made the world know the high level of Japanese technology". Three-time Indianapolis 500 winner Dario Franchitti drove the RA272 in 2011, after which he remarked that it "probably has the best sound of any car I've driven or heard, and that's saying a lot. That's special."

At the 2021 Turkish Grand Prix Formula One race – the replacement for the Japanese Grand Prix that was cancelled due to the COVID-19 pandemic that year – the Red Bull-Honda team ran a livery inspired by the RA272 on their RB16B cars as a homage Honda's Japanese fans. Two years earlier, the team's driver Max Verstappen tested the RA272 during the week of the Japanese Grand Prix, the first time he had driven a racing car made before 2008. At the 2025 Japanese Grand Prix, Red Bull Racing-Honda RBPT ran another white "tribute livery" inspired by the RA272 on their RB21 cars, both to honour the 60 years of Honda's first F1 win and their final year of collaboration.

The RA272 appeared in the Formula One Championship Edition video game as an unlockable bonus car. It also serves as the design influence for the B Dasher kart in the Mario Kart series. It was also introduced in Gran Turismo 7 as part of the 1.29 update.

Several model kit and scale model manufacturers were available to create a replica of the RA272 including Tamiya in 1/20 scale and AUTOart in 1/18 scale.

== Gallery ==
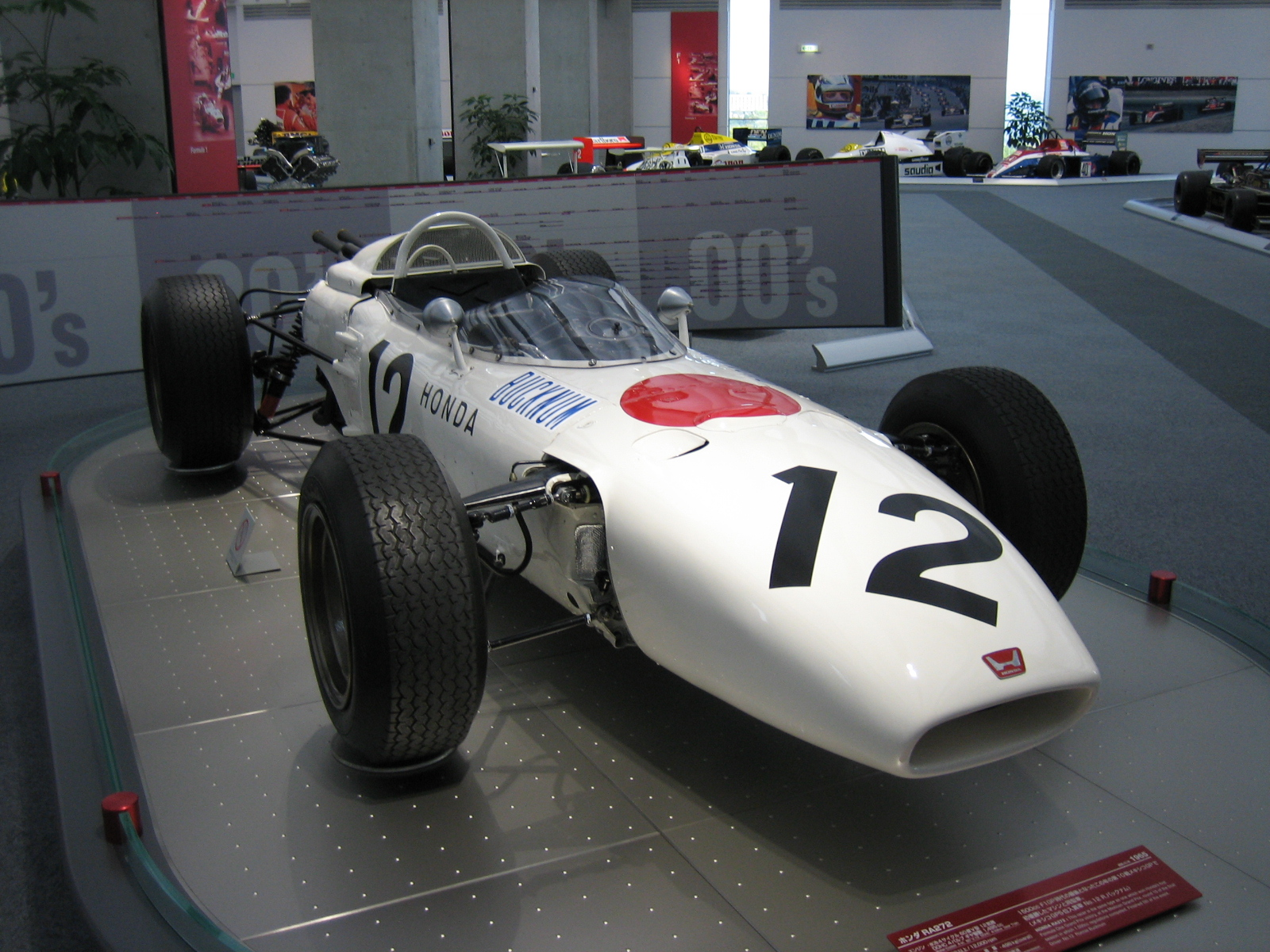
The RA272 on display at the Honda Collection Hall

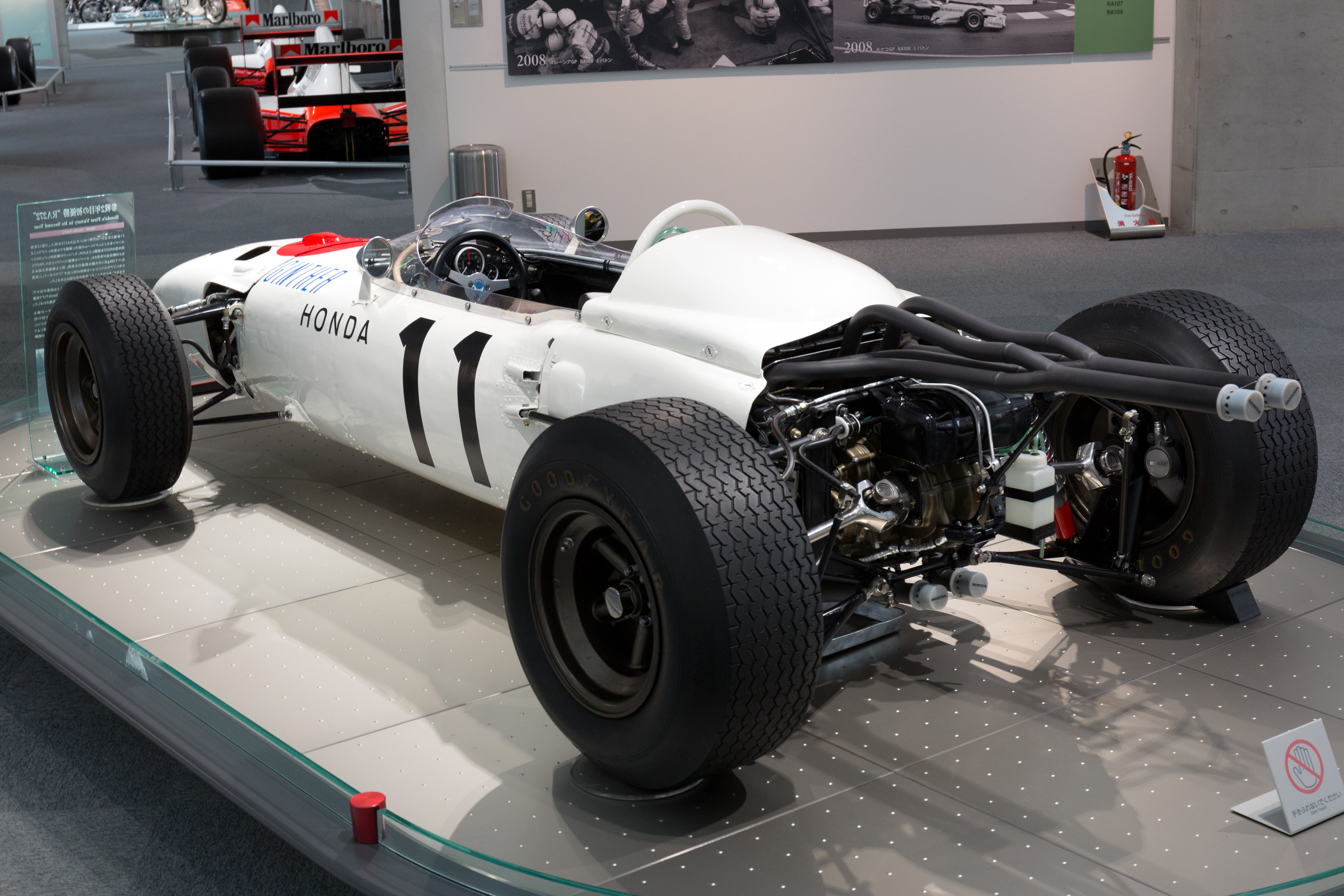
Rear-left view of the RA272

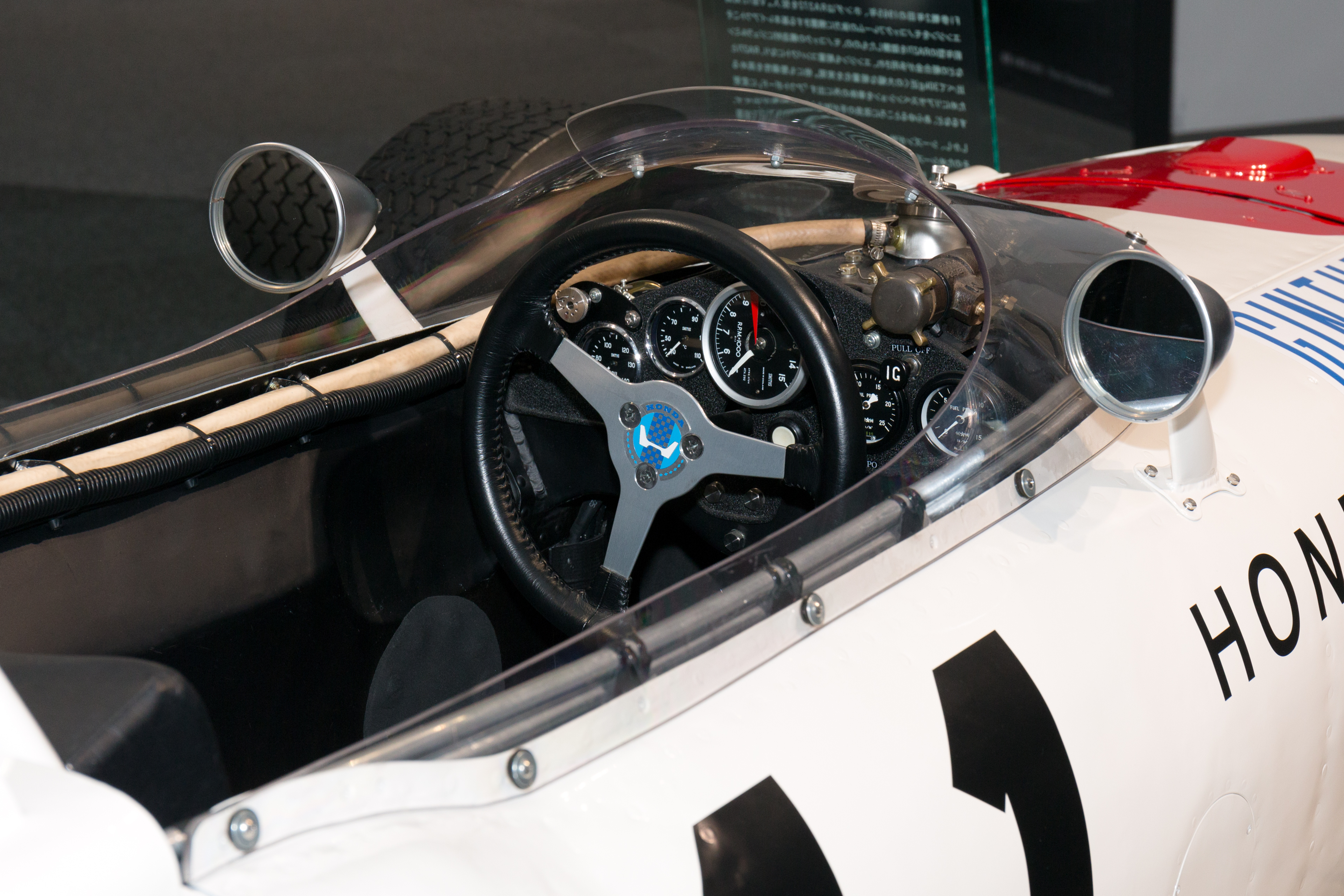
View of the cockpit

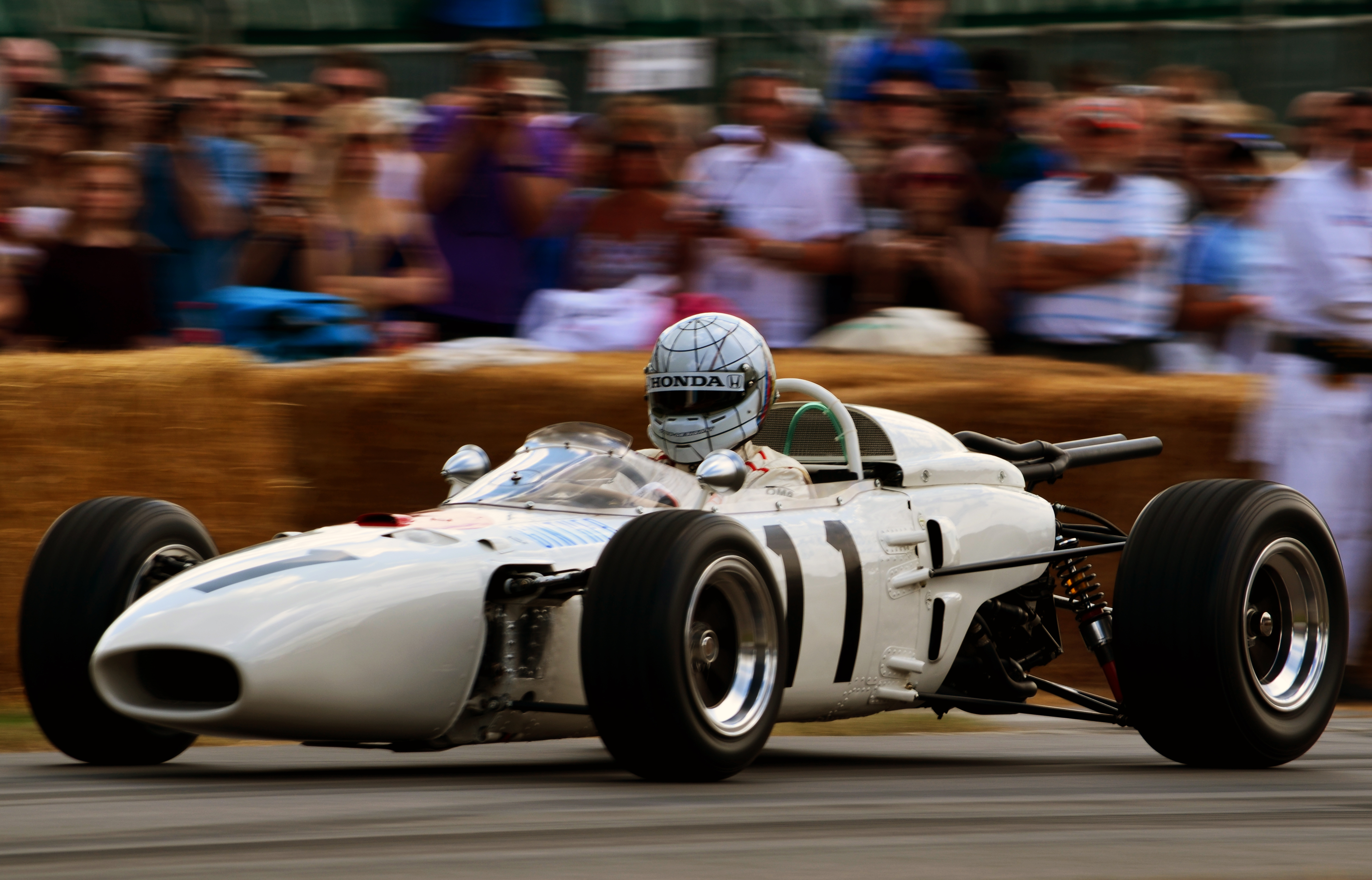
The RA272 being driven at Goodwood in 2014

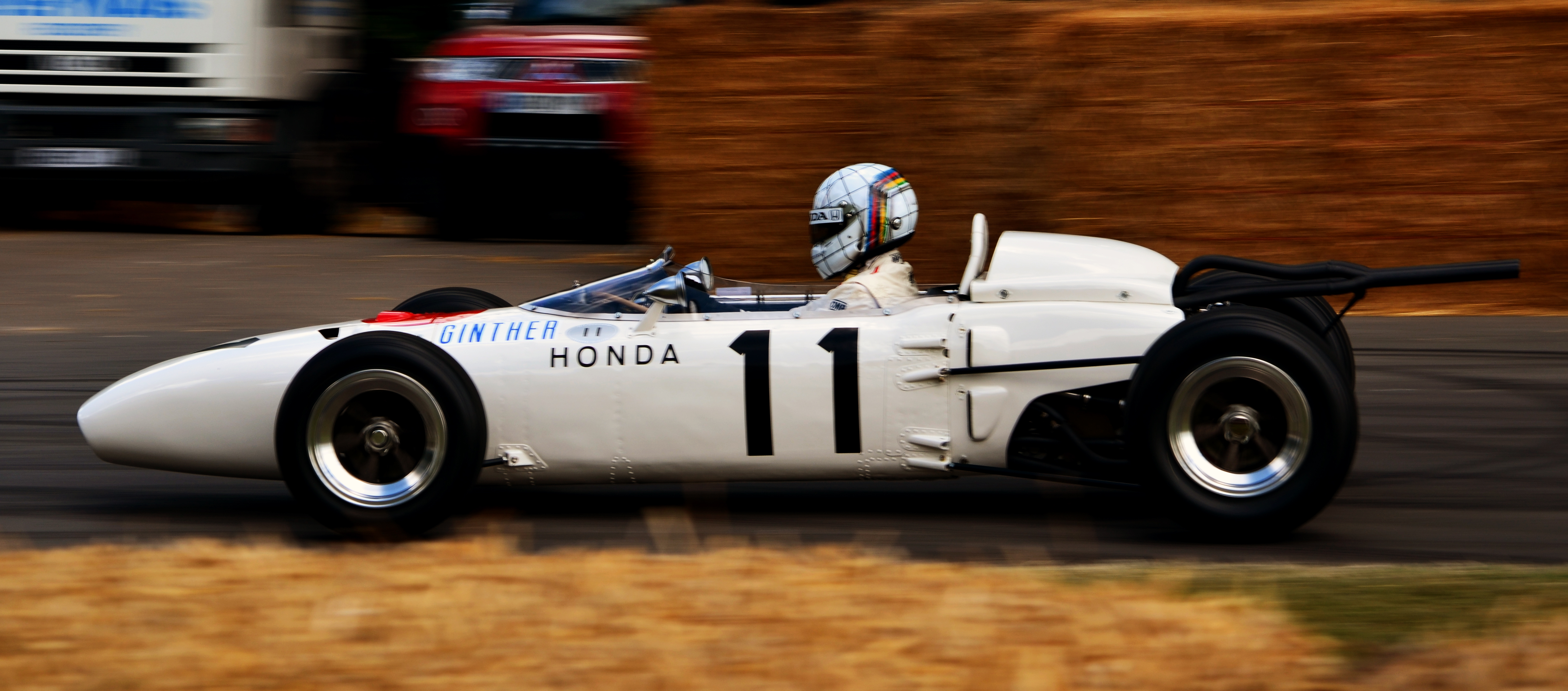
Side view of the car

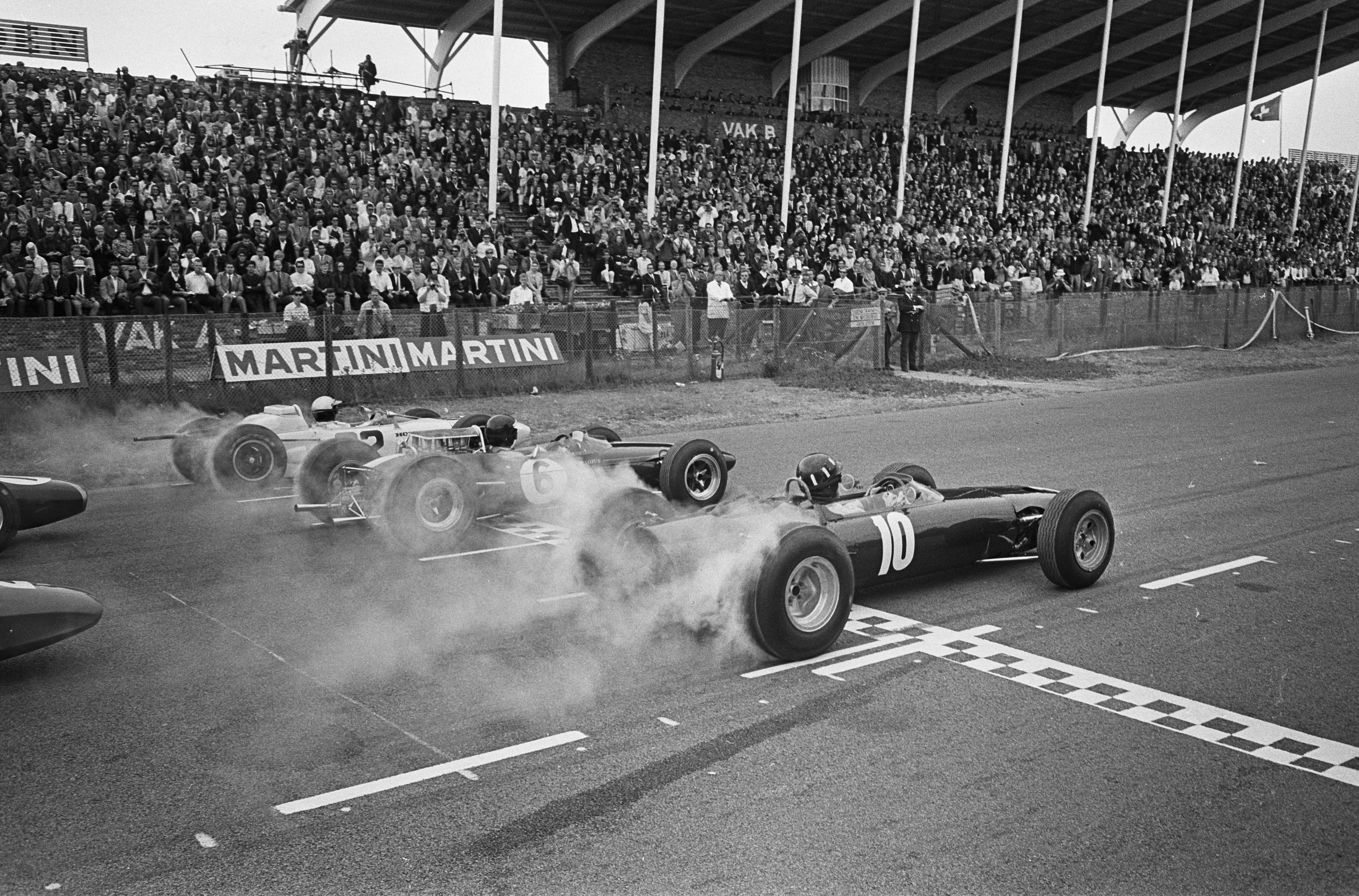
The RA272 at the start of the 1965 Dutch Grand Prix

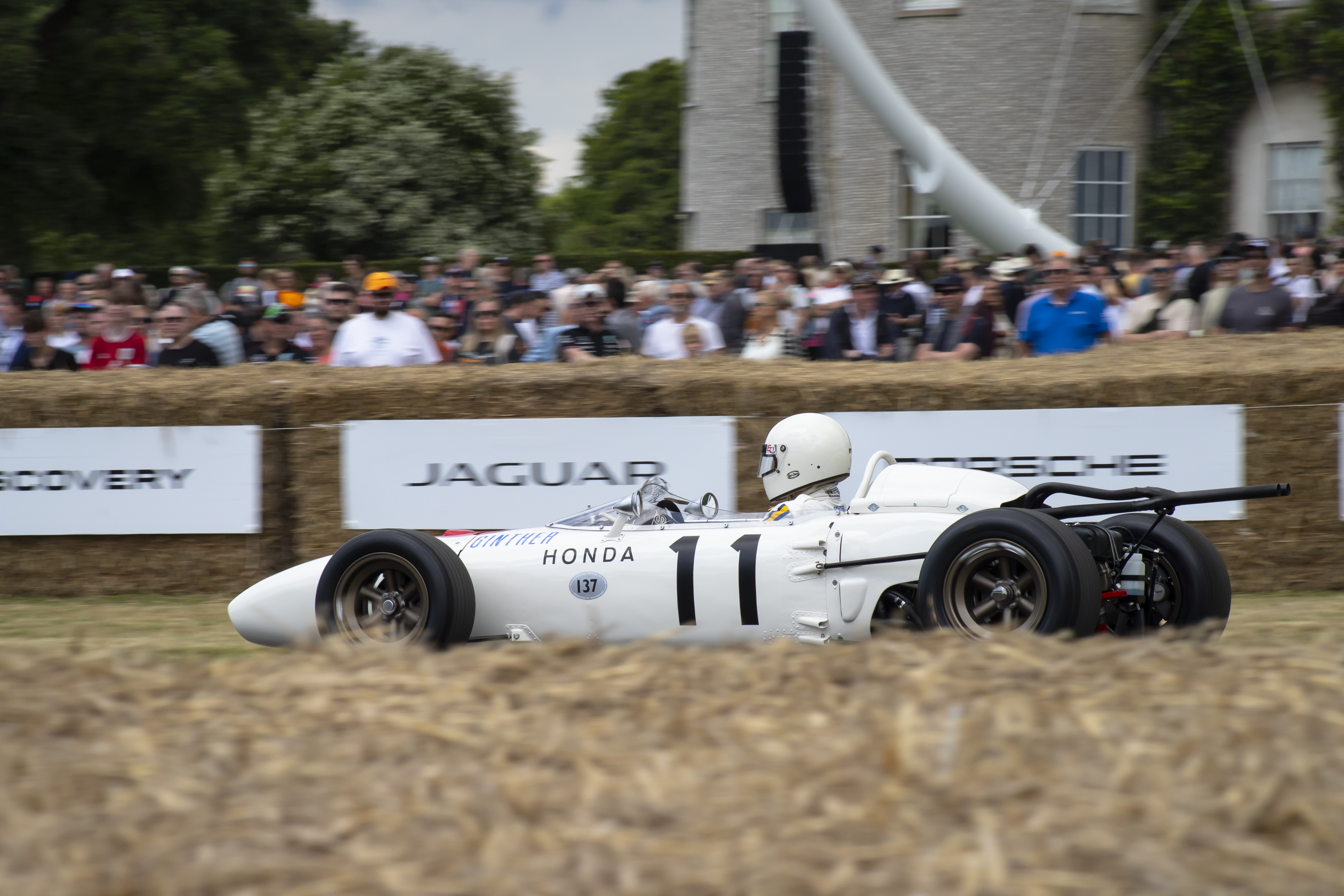
Yuki Tsunoda at the 2024 Goodwood Festival of Speed

== Formula One World Championship results ==
(key) (Races in italics indicate fastest lap)

Year	Entrant	Engine	Drivers	Tyres	1	2	3	4	5	6	7	8	9	10	Pts.	WCC
1965	Honda R & D Company	Honda RA272E 1.5L V12		G	RSA	MON	BEL	FRA	GBR	NED	GER	ITA	USA	MEX	11	6th
1965	Honda R & D Company	Honda RA272E 1.5L V12	Richie Ginther	G		Ret	6	Ret	Ret	6		Ret	7	1	11	6th
1965	Honda R & D Company	Honda RA272E 1.5L V12	Ronnie Bucknum	G		Ret	Ret	Ret				Ret	13	5	11	6th
