= Honda Collection Hall =

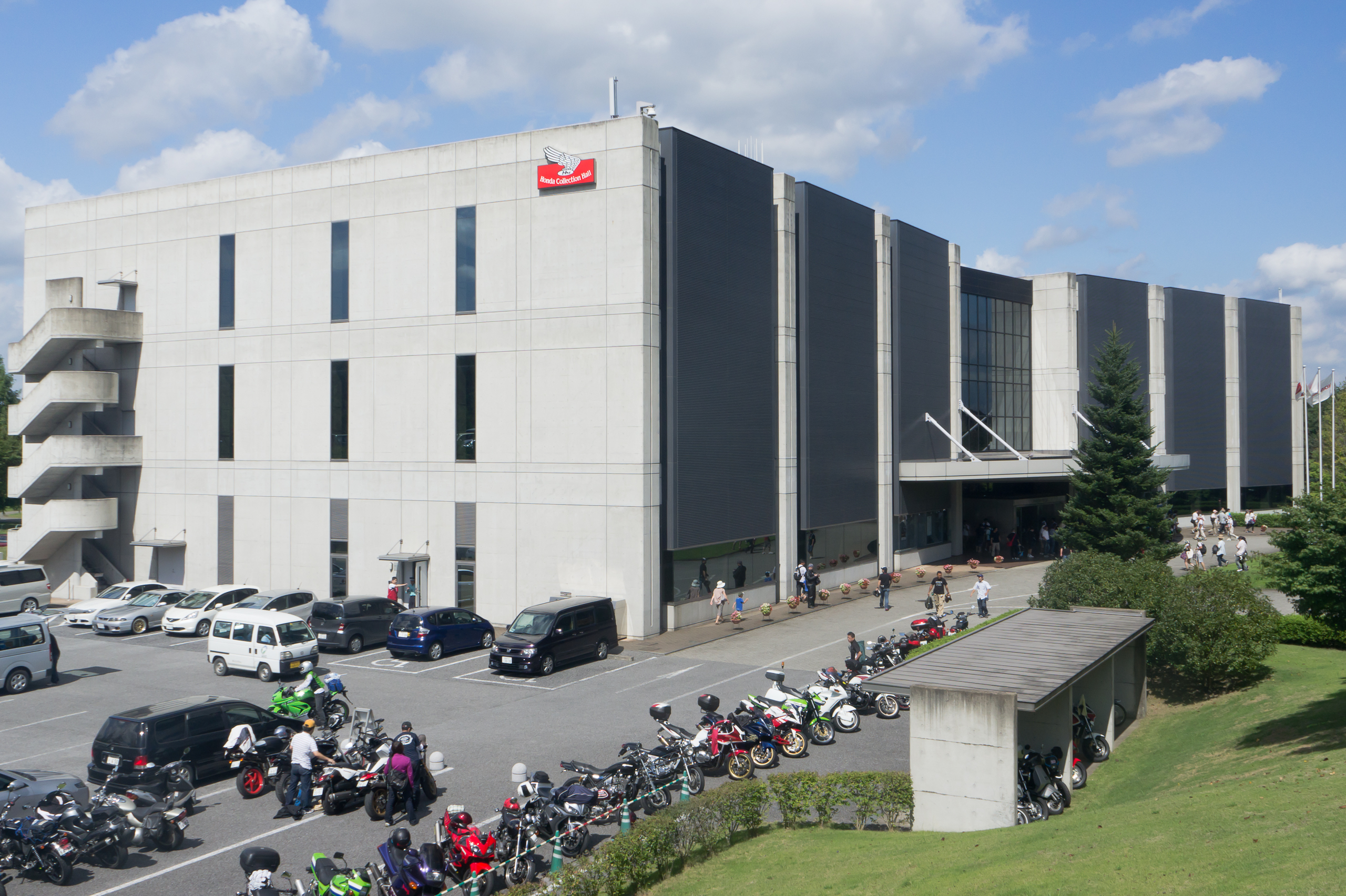
- Exterior view of Honda Collection Hall in 2011
- Established: 1998; 28 years ago
- Location: Motegi, Japan
- Coordinates: 36.527°N 140.227°E
- Type: Transport museum
- Collection size: 350 completely restored items
- Public transit access: Motegi Station - 20 min. by bus
- Website: world.honda.com/collection-hall/

The Honda Collection Hall is a transport museum housing a collection of Honda consumer- and racing-oriented artifacts. It is on the grounds of the Twin Ring Motegi race track located in Motegi, Tochigi, Japan. It opened in 1998. It is operated by Honda's subsidiary, Honda Mobilityland.

== Collection ==
All items in the collection are maintained in running order; the museum posts times when visitors can see the display models started. The museum contains approximately 350 automobiles, motorcycles and power products. This is a sampling of items that press reports found particularly noteworthy.

=== Pre-20th century ===
- Daimler Reitwagen (replica)

=== 20th century ===
- Honda Dream A — first product to carry the Honda name in 1947
- Honda RC142 — first Honda MotoGP point by Naomi Taniguchi in 1959
- 2RC143 — Honda's first Isle of Man TT win in 1961
- T360 pickup truck — Honda's first four-wheel vehicle in 1963
- RA272 — Honda's first Formula One winner in 1965
- NR500 — oval-pistoned race motorcycle and Honda's first V-4 in 1979

=== 21st century ===
- ASIMO and Honda's E series/P series prototype humanoid robots
- Caixa folding electric scooter
