= Lola Mk4 =

Lola Mk4/4A
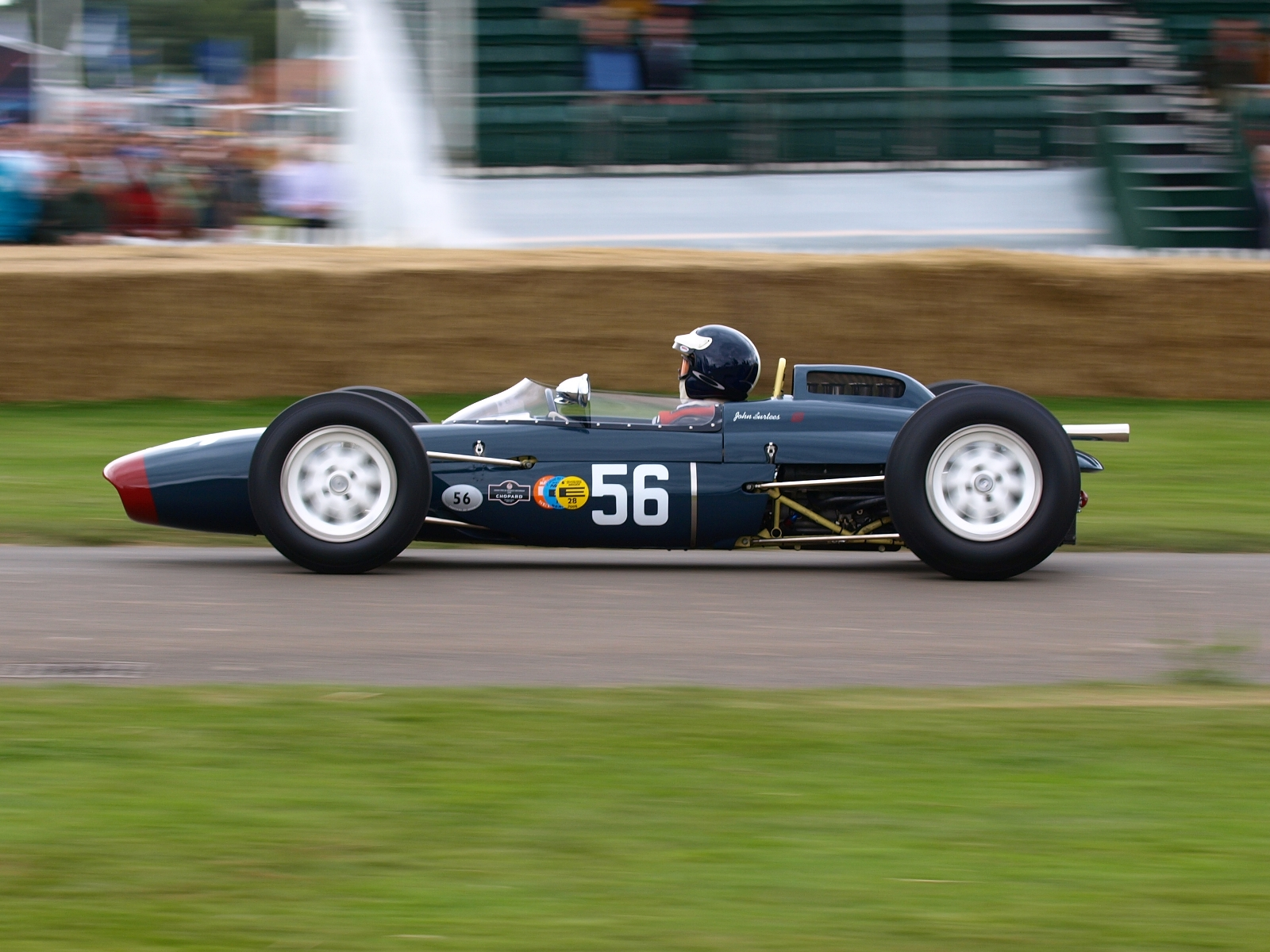
- Category: Formula One
- Constructor: Lola Cars
- Designer(s): Eric Broadley
- Successor: Lola T100 (Direct); Honda RA300 (Formula 1)

Technical specifications
- Chassis: Steel spaceframe
- Suspension (front): Upper: transverse- and trailing-arm; Lower: reversed single wishbone and transverse-arm. Outboard spring/damper units.
- Suspension (rear): Double reversed wishbones with twin-torsion bars, outboard spring/damper.
- Length: 3.76 millimetres (0.148 in)
- Axle track: 1,295 millimetres (51.0 in) (Front); 1,295 millimetres (51.0 in) (Rear)
- Wheelbase: 2,390 millimetres (94 in)
- Engine: Coventry Climax FWMV 1496cc V8, normally aspirated. Mid-engined, longitudinally mounted.
- Transmission: Colotti Type 32, 5-speed manual
- Power: 186 brake horsepower (139 kW) @ 8,500 rpm 161 newton-metres (119 lbf⋅ft) @ 7,500 rpm
- Weight: 1,060 lb (480.8 kg) dry

Competition history
- Notable entrants: Bowmaker Racing Team; Reg Parnell Racing
- Notable drivers: (United Kingdom) John Surtees (United Kingdom) Roy Salvadori (United Kingdom) Bob Anderson (Belgium) Lucien Bianchi (United Kingdom) John Campbell-Jones (New Zealand) Chris Amon (United States) Masten Gregory (United Kingdom) Mike Hailwood
- Debut: 1962 Dutch Grand Prix, Zandvoort.
Races	Wins	Poles	F/Laps
18	0 (WC F1); 2 (non-C. F1); 1 (Intercont.)	1 (WC F1); 2 (non-C. F1)	0
- n.b. Unless otherwise stated, all data refer to Formula One World Championship Grands Prix only.

The Lola Mk4 and the derivative Mk4A were Formula One racing cars constructed by the Lola company in 1962. They were designed by Lola founder, owner and Chief Designer Eric Broadley at the request of Reg Parnell, proprietor of the Bowmaker Racing Team. The Mk4 was the first design that Lola produced for the top tier of motorsport.

== History ==
Design of the car broadly followed Broadley's experience in the Formula Junior category, with a steel spaceframe chassis braced by bulkheads in front and behind the driver. The engine was carried within the chassis, and cooling was by a radiator mounted at the front of the bodywork; two tubes of the spaceframe acting as coolant pipes to and from the engine. Following supply delays with Coventry Climax's new V8 engine, the cars were initially built up around the older, inline 4-cylinder FPF engine.

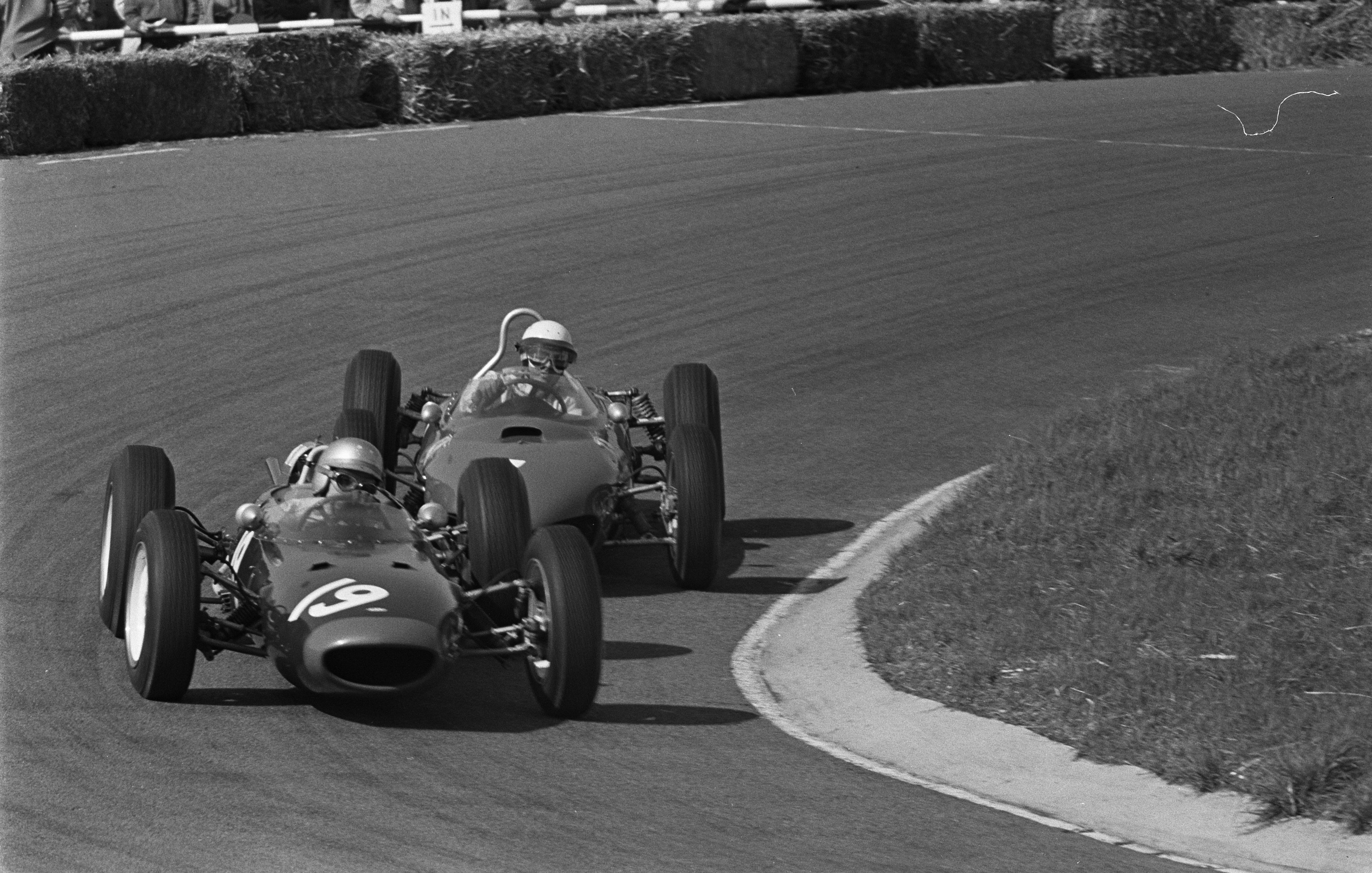
Surtees leads defending World Champion Phil Hill's Ferrari, on the Mk4's Championship debut at the 1962 Dutch Grand Prix

The Mk4 had its first outing in the non-Championship 1962 Brussels Grand Prix where it qualified in the midfield but failed to finish. Its first World Championship race was the 1962 Dutch Grand Prix. By now the cars were fitted with the more powerful Climax FWMV V8 engine; the meeting went somewhat better with John Surtees qualifying his car in pole position. Once again though, poor reliability let the race performance down, and neither car reached the finishing line. Surtees took the car's first victory in the 2000 Guineas race at Mallory Park in the middle of the season, but excess chassis flex impeded his Championship hopes.

A stopgap solution to the flexing problems was to weld extra tubes around the cockpit of the Mk4. When the revised Mk4A was introduced its most significant difference was in a number of body panels that were welded to the chassis in what Lola described as a semi-monocoque design. With the uprated designs results continued to trickle in, but a lack of development funding stunted the cars competitive growth, and by the end of the season both the Mk4 and 4A were completely outclassed. It was only in Tasman Series racing, with the addition of the 2,750 cc (168 cu in) version of the FPF straight-four, that the car showed some promise. Two such-equipped Mk4 cars were shipped to New Zealand and Australia for their respective Grands Prix in early 1963, where regular driver Surtees was partnered by up-and-coming South African Tony Maggs. In his last two races for the Bowmaker team, before signing with Ferrari, Surtees won the New Zealand Grand Prix and finished second in the Australian Grand Prix, a month later. Maggs failed to finish on either occasion.

With the withdrawal of Bowmaker, Reg Parnell Racing continued with the Mk4/4A cars into the 1963 World Championship season, but only as second-string cars behind new Coopers. One Mk4 was sold to privateer Bob Anderson who entered the car into many Championship and non-Championship races, winning the 1963 Rome Grand Prix.

== Complete Formula One results ==
(key) (results in bold indicate pole position)

=== World Championship ===
Year	Entrant	Engine	Drivers	1	2	3	4	5	6	7	8	9	10	Points	WCC
1962	Bowmaker Racing Team	Climax V8		NED	MON	BEL	FRA	GBR	GER	ITA	USA	RSA		19	4th
1962	Bowmaker Racing Team	Climax V8	John Surtees	**Ret**	4	5	5	2	2	Ret^{†}	Ret	Ret		19	4th
1962	Bowmaker Racing Team	Climax V8	Roy Salvadori	Ret	Ret		Ret	Ret	Ret	Ret		Ret		19	4th
1963	Reg Parnell Racing	Climax V8		MON	BEL	NED	FRA	GBR	GER	ITA	USA	MEX	RSA	0	13th
1963	Reg Parnell Racing	Climax V8	Maurice Trintignant	Ret^{†}										0	13th
1963	Reg Parnell Racing	Climax V8	Lucien Bianchi		Ret									0	13th
1963	Reg Parnell Racing	Climax V8	Chris Amon	PO^{†}	Ret^{†}	Ret^{†}	7^{†}	7^{†}	Ret^{†}	PO^{†}				0	13th
1963	Reg Parnell Racing	Climax V8	John Campbell-Jones					13						0	13th
1963	Reg Parnell Racing	Climax V8	Mike Hailwood							Ret				0	13th
1963	Reg Parnell Racing	Climax V8	Masten Gregory								Ret^{†}	Ret^{†}		0	13th
1963	DW Racing Enterprises	Climax V8	Bob Anderson					12		12				0	13th

^{†} Mk4A chassis.

=== Non-Championship ===
(key)

Year	Entrant	Drivers	1	2	3	4	5	6	7	8	9	10	11	12	13	14	15	16	17	18	19	20	21	22
1962	Bowmaker Racing Team		CAP	NZL	BRX	LOM	LAV	GLV	PAU	AIN	INT	NAP	MAL	CLP	RMS	SOL	KAN	MED	DAN	OUL	MEX	AUS	RAN	NAT
1962	Bowmaker Racing Team	John Surtees			Ret^{‡}	Ret^{‡}	Ret^{‡}	Ret		Ret	3		1		Ret	DNA	Ret^{†}		Ret^{†}	Ret	Ret		3	
1962	Bowmaker Racing Team	Roy Salvadori					2^{‡}	4^{‡}		Ret^{‡}	Ret			**2**	6		2		Ret	Ret				
1963	Bowmaker Racing Team		NZL	AUS	LOM	GLV	PAU	IMO	SYR	AIN	INT	ROM	SOL	KAN	MED	AUT	OUL	RAN						
1963	Bowmaker Racing Team	John Surtees	1^{‡}	2^{‡}																				
1963	Bowmaker Racing Team	Tony Maggs	Ret^{‡}	Ret^{‡}																				
1963	Reg Parnell Racing	Chris Amon				5^{†}				6^{†}	Ret^{†}		Ret^{†}			4								
1963	Reg Parnell Racing	Mike Hailwood											16				7							
1963	DW Racing Enterprises	Bob Anderson			Ret		Ret	3	4			1	8	8	6		Ret							

^{†} Mk4A chassis.
^{‡} Car ran with 4-cylinder FPF engine. On all other occasions the cars were fitted with the V8 FWMV engine.
