= Bernard Collomb =

French racing driver (1930–2011)

- Born: Bernard Marie François Alexandre Collomb-Clerc; 7 October 1930; Annecy, Haute-Savoie, France
- Died: 19 September 2011 (aged 80); La Colle-sur-Loup, Alpes-Maritimes, France

Formula One World Championship career
- Nationality: (France) French
- Active years: 1961 – 1964
- Team(s): non-works Cooper, non-works Lotus
- Entries: 6 (4 starts)
- Championships: 0
- Wins: 0
- Podiums: 0
- Career points: 0
- Pole positions: 0
- Fastest laps: 0
- First entry: 1961 French Grand Prix
- Last entry: 1964 Monaco Grand Prix

Bernard Marie François Alexandre Collomb-Clerc (7 October 1930 – 19 September 2011) was a Formula One driver from France. He participated in six World Championship Grands Prix, debuting on 2 July 1961, scoring no championship points. He almost always drove self-prepared cars, and first raced Coopers, switching to Lotuses in 1963. His best Formula One result was fourth at Vienna in a non-Championship race in 1961, at the wheel of a Cooper-Climax.

== Complete Formula One World Championship results ==
(key)

Year	Entrant	Chassis	Engine	1	2	3	4	5	6	7	8	9	10	WDC	Points
1961	Bernard Collomb	Cooper T53	Climax Straight-4	MON	NED	BEL	FRA; Ret	GBR	GER; NC	ITA	USA			NC	0
1962	Bernard Collomb	Cooper T53	Climax Straight-4	NED	MON	BEL	FRA	GBR	GER; Ret	ITA	USA	RSA		NC	0
1963	Bernard Collomb	Lotus 24	Climax V8	MON; DNQ	BEL	NED	FRA	GBR	GER; 10	ITA	USA	MEX	RSA	NC	0
1964	Bernard Collomb	Lotus 24	Climax V8	MON; DNQ	NED	BEL	FRA	GBR	GER	AUT	ITA	USA	MEX	NC	0

=== Non-Championship results ===
(key)

Year	Entrant	Chassis	Engine	1	2	3	4	5	6	7	8	9	10	11	12	13	14	15	16	17	18	19	20	21
1961	Bernard Collomb	Cooper T45	Climax Straight-4	LOM; Ret	GLV																			
1961	Bernard Collomb	Cooper T53	Climax Straight-4			PAU; DNA	BRX		AIN; Ret	SYR	NAP; 6	LON; 9	SIL; Ret	SOL	KAN	DAN	MOD	FLG	OUL; Ret	LEW	VAL	RAN	NAT	RSA
1961	Bernard Collomb	Cooper T51	Climax Straight-4					VIE; 4																
1962	Bernard Collomb	Cooper T53	Climax Straight-4	CAP	BRX; DNQ	LOM	LAV	GLV	PAU; DNA	AIN	INT	NAP	MAL	CLP	RMS	SOL; 8	KAN; Ret	MED; 5	DAN	OUL; 9	MEX	RAN	NAT	
1963	Bernard Collomb	Lotus 24	Climax V8	LOM	GLV	PAU; Ret	IMO; Ret	SYR; Ret	AIN	INT	ROM; NC	SOL; 11	KAN	MED; 10	AUT; 5	OUL; 14	RAN							
1964	Bernard Collomb	Lotus 24	Climax V8	DMT; Ret	NWT; Ret	SYR	AIN	INT	SOL	MED	RAN													
1965	Bernard Collomb	Lotus 24	Climax V8	ROC	SYR; 7	SMT	INT	MED	RAN															
