= Heinz Schiller =

Swiss racing driver (1930–2007)

- Born: 25 January 1930; Frauenfeld, Switzerland
- Died: 26 March 2007 (aged 77); Montana, Switzerland

Formula One World Championship career
- Nationality: (Switzerland) Swiss
- Active years: 1962
- Team: non-works Lotus
- Entries: 1
- Championships: 0
- Wins: 0
- Podiums: 0
- Career points: 0
- Pole positions: 0
- Fastest laps: 0
- First entry: 1962 German Grand Prix

Heinz Rudolf Schiller (January 25, 1930 – March 26, 2007), was a racing driver from Switzerland. He participated in one Formula One World Championship Grand Prix, on August 5, 1962. He retired from the race, scoring no championship points.

Schiller was a speedboat champion in his native Switzerland before turning to sports car racing, finding success during the mid-1950s. He then switched to single seater cars, starting in hillclimbing before moving up to circuit racing.

Schiller first appeared in Formula One at the beginning of 1962 with Ecurie Nationale Suisse, driving their three-year-old Porsche in the Brussels Grand Prix, where he finished eighth on aggregate after the three heats. He subsequently drove the same car at the 1962 Pau Grand Prix, coming home ninth.

Under the Ecurie Filipinetti banner but still driving the same Porsche, Schiller failed to qualify at the Naples Grand Prix, largely because only ten cars were permitted to take the start. He was entered by Ecurie Maarsbergen for the 1962 Belgian Grand Prix but was withdrawn, before finishing seventh in the Grosser Preis der Solitude for Ecurie Filipinetti. He then switched to a Lotus 24 for his single World Championship event, the 1962 German Grand Prix which ended with oil pressure problems, as did his attempt at the Mediterranean Grand Prix, now back in the Porsche.

Schiller made one appearance in Formula One in 1963, finishing third at Pau but five laps down, again in the old Porsche, before returning to sports cars. He finished 10th at the 1964 24 Hours of Le Mans with Gerhard Koch.

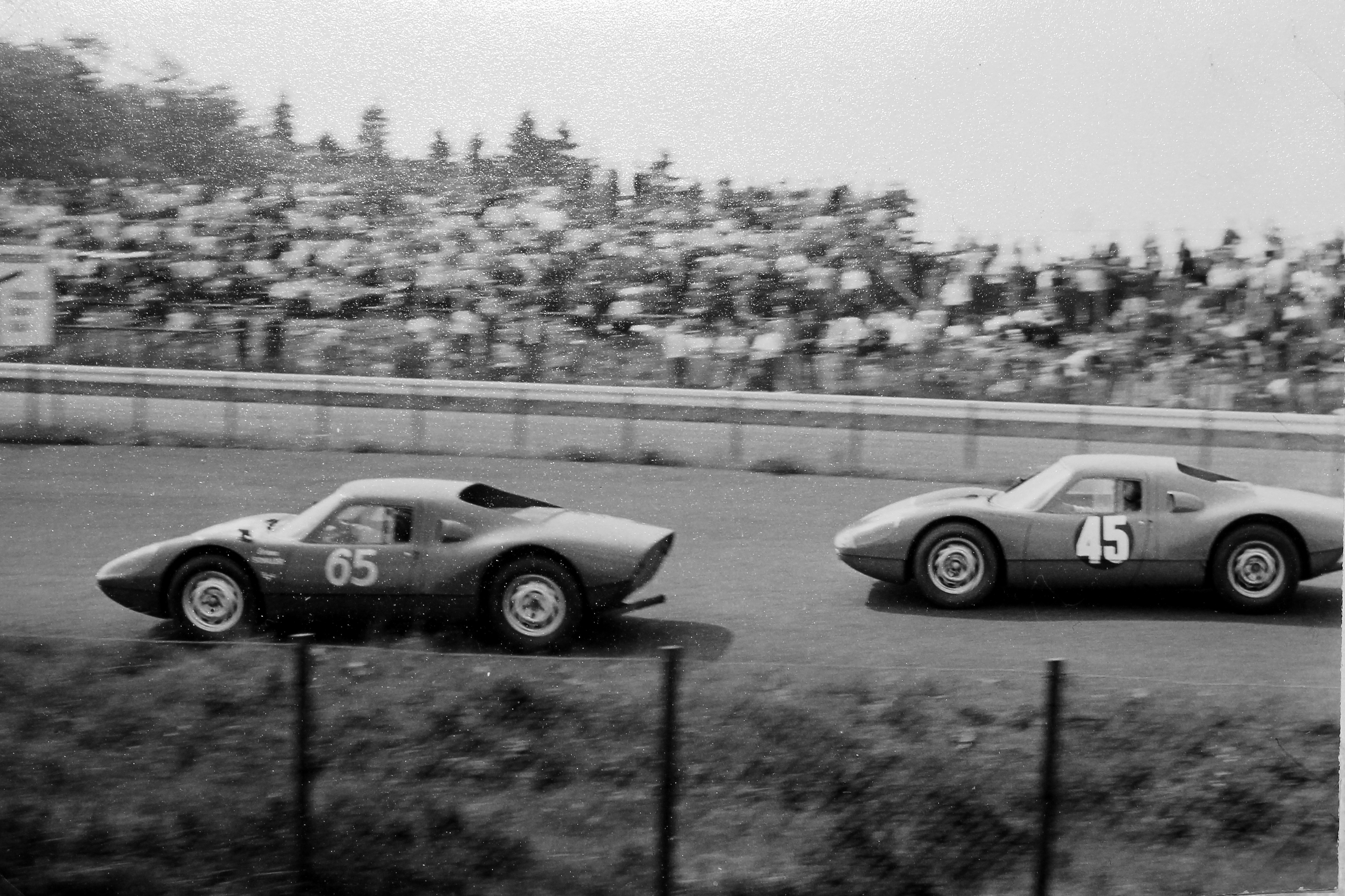
Schiller (car 65) at the 1964 Nürburgring 1000 km

== Complete Formula One World Championship results ==
(key)

Year	Entrant	Chassis	Engine	1	2	3	4	5	6	7	8	9	WDC	Points
1962	Ecurie Filipinetti	Lotus 24	BRM V8	NED	MON	BEL	FRA	GBR	GER; Ret	ITA	USA	RSA	NC	0

=== Non-Championship ===
(key) (Races in italics indicate fastest lap)

Year	Entrant	Chassis	Engine	1	2	3	4	5	6	7	8	9	10	11	12	13	14	15	16	17	18	19	20
1962	Ecurie Nationale Suisse	Porsche 718	Porsche Flat-4	CAP	BRX; 8	LOM	LAV	GLV	PAU; 9	AIN	INT												
1962	Ecurie Filipinetti	Porsche 718	Porsche Flat-4									NAP; DNQ	MAL	CLP	RMS	SOL; 7	KAN	MED; Ret	DAN	OUL	MEX	RAN	NAT
1963	Ecurie Filipinetti	Porsche 718	Porsche Flat-4	LOM	GLV	PAU; 3	IMO	SYR	AIN	INT	ROM	SOL	KAN	MED	AUT	OUL	RAN						
