= Tony Settember =

American racing driver (1926–2014)

- Born: July 10, 1926; Manila, Philippines
- Died: May 4, 2014 (aged 87); Reno, Nevada, United States

Formula One World Championship career
- Nationality: (United States) American
- Active years: 1962 – 1963
- Team(s): Emeryson, Scirocco
- Entries: 7 (6 starts)
- Championships: 0
- Wins: 0
- Podiums: 0
- Career points: 0
- Pole positions: 0
- Fastest laps: 0
- First entry: 1962 British Grand Prix
- Last entry: 1963 Italian Grand Prix

Anthony Frank Settember (July 10, 1926 – May 4, 2014) was a racing driver and engineer from the United States. He was born in Manila, Philippines.

Settember participated in seven Formula One World Championship Grands Prix, debuting on July 21, 1962. He scored no championship points. Settember was the nominal head of the Scirocco racing team, and a very efficient driver in sportscars. In addition, he competed in the Trans-Am Series and attempted to qualify for the 1983 Winston Western 500 in the NASCAR Winston Cup Series.

Settember's last known participation in motorsport was on his 70th birthday.

Settember died after a short illness at a hospice in Reno, Nevada in May 2014.

== Complete Formula One World Championship results ==
(key)

Year	Entrant	Chassis	Engine	1	2	3	4	5	6	7	8	9	10	WDC	Points
1962	Emeryson Cars	Emeryson Mk2	Climax Straight-4	NED	MON	BEL	FRA	GBR; 11	GER	ITA; Ret	USA	RSA		NC	0
1963	Scirocco-Powell	Scirocco 01	BRM V8	MON; WD	BEL; Ret	NED; WD	FRA; Ret	GBR; Ret	GER; Ret	ITA; DNQ	USA	MEX	RSA	NC	0

=== Complete Formula One Non-Championship results ===
(key) (Races in bold indicate pole position) (Races in italics indicate fastest lap)

Year	Entrant	Chassis	Engine	1	2	3	4	5	6	7	8	9	10	11	12	13	14	15	16	17	18	19	20
1962	Emeryson Cars	Emeryson Mk2	Climax Straight-4	CAP	BRX	LOM; DNA	LAV; Ret	GLV; 8	PAU	AIN; 8	INT; 14	NAP; 9	MAL	CLP; 4	RMS	SOL; Ret	KAN; DNA	MED	DAN	OUL; DNS	MEX	RAN	NAT
1963	Scirocco-Powell	Scirocco 01	BRM V8	LOM	GLV	PAU; WD	IMO	SYR	AIN	INT; WD	ROM	SOL; Ret	KAN; Ret	MED	AUT; 2	OUL; Ret	RAN						
