= 1962 Brussels Grand Prix =

- Non-championship race in the 1962 Formula One season

Race details
- Date: 1 April 1962
- Official name: IV Grand Prix de Bruxelles
- Location: Heysel Park, Belgium
- Course: Street Circuit
- Course length: 4.553 km (2.829 miles)
- Distance: 22 (x3) laps, 300.454 km (186.693 miles)

Pole position
Driver	(United Kingdom) Jim Clark	Lotus-Climax
- Time: 2:03.1

Fastest lap
Driver	(United Kingdom) Stirling Moss	Lotus-Climax
- Time: 2:02.0

Podium
First	(Belgium) Willy Mairesse	Ferrari
Second	(Sweden) Jo Bonnier	Porsche
Third	(United Kingdom) Innes Ireland	Lotus-Climax

The 1962 Brussels Grand Prix was a motor race run for cars complying with Formula One rules, held on 1 April 1962 at Heysel Park, Belgium. The race was run in three heats of 22 laps each and the results were aggregated. The race was won by Belgian driver Willy Mairesse in a Ferrari 156. The course was somewhat altered over previous years, as part of the area that had held spectators was now in commercial use. This was the debut for BRM's new V8 engine, as well as the first race for the upgraded Coventry-Climax V8 used in Jim Clark's Lotus.

== Qualifying ==
Pos.	Number	Driver	Constructor	Car	Lap	Gap
1	6	(United Kingdom) Jim Clark	Lotus-Climax	Lotus 24	2:03.1	
2	1	(United Kingdom) Stirling Moss	Lotus-Climax	Lotus 18/21	2:03.3	+0.2
3	12	(United Kingdom) Graham Hill	BRM	BRM P578	2:03.9	+0.6
4	10	(Belgium) Willy Mairesse	Ferrari	Ferrari 156	2:04.7	+0.8
5	14	(United Kingdom) Tony Marsh	BRM	BRM P57	2:06.0	+1.3
6	16	(Sweden) Jo Bonnier	Porsche	Porsche 718	2:06.2	+0.2
7	2	(United Kingdom) Innes Ireland	Lotus-Climax	Lotus 18/21	2:07.7	+1.5
8	5	(United Kingdom) Roy Salvadori	Cooper-Climax	Cooper T56	2:09.2	+1.5
9	3	(United States) Masten Gregory	Lotus-Climax	Lotus 18/21	2:09.6	+0.4
10	4	(United Kingdom) John Surtees	Lola-Climax	Lola Mk4	2:09.8	+0.2
11	21	(United Kingdom) Keith Greene	Gilby-Climax	Gilby	2:10.9	+1.1
12	7	(United Kingdom) Trevor Taylor	Lotus-Climax	Lotus 21	2:12.0	+1.1
13	8	(United Kingdom) John Campbell-Jones	Emeryson-Climax	Emeryson	2:13.0	+1.0
14	19	(Switzerland) Jo Siffert	Lotus-Cosworth	Lotus 22	2:13.3	+0.3
15	20	(United Kingdom) Ian Burgess	Cooper-Climax	Cooper T53	2:13.7	+0.4
16	18	(Switzerland) Heinz Schiller	Porsche	Porsche 718	2:17.5	+3.8
17	17	(Germany) Wolfgang Seidel	Porsche	Porsche 718	2:19.5	+2.0
18	9	(Belgium) André Pilette	Emeryson-Climax	Emeryson	2:25.5	+6.0
19	11	(Belgium) Lucien Bianchi	ENB-Maserati	ENB	2:32.5	+7.0
DNQ	15	(Italy) Nino Vaccarella^{1}	Lotus-Climax	Lotus 18/21	2:21.2	
DNQ	22	(France) Bernard Collomb	Cooper-Climax	Cooper T53	no time^{2}	
DNA	8	(United Kingdom) Peter Arundell^{3}	Emeryson-Climax	Emeryson		

^{1}Vaccarella was 'bumped' to make way for the invited home-country drivers Pilette and Bianchi
^{2}car burnt out in practice accident
^{3}entry taken by Campbell-Jones

== Results ==
Conventional Aggregate

Pos	No	Driver	Constructor	Laps	Time/Retired	Heat 1 / 2 / 3
1	10	(Belgium) Willy Mairesse	Ferrari	66	2:18'37.1	3rd / 1st / 1st
2	16	(Sweden) Jo Bonnier	Porsche	66	+1'50.2	6th / 2nd / 2nd
3	2	(United Kingdom) Innes Ireland	Lotus-Climax	66	+2'40.6	7th / 3rd / 3rd
4	21	(United Kingdom) Keith Greene	Gilby-Climax	65	+1 Lap	9th / 5th / 5th
5	14	(Switzerland) Jo Siffert	Lotus-Cosworth	62	+3 Laps	13th / 7th / 6th
6	18	(Switzerland) Heinz Schiller	Porsche	62	+3 Laps	12th / 8th / 7th

Official Aggregate

Pos	No	Driver	Constructor	Laps	Heat 1 / 2 / 3
1	10	(Belgium) Willy Mairesse	Ferrari	66	3+1+1=5
2	16	(Sweden) Jo Bonnier	Porsche	66	6+2+2=10
3	2	(United Kingdom) Innes Ireland	Lotus-Climax	66	7+3+3=13
4	21	(United Kingdom) Keith Greene	Gilby-Climax	65	9+5+5=19
5	8	(United Kingdom) John Campbell-Jones	Emeryson-Climax	55	8+4+10=22
6	14	(Switzerland) Jo Siffert	Lotus-Cosworth	62	13+7+6=26
7	20	(United Kingdom) Ian Burgess	Cooper-Climax	60	11+6+9=26
8	18	(Switzerland) Heinz Schiller	Porsche	62	12+8+8=28
9	17	(Germany) Wolfgang Seidel	Porsche	62	14+9+7=30
10	7	(United Kingdom) Trevor Taylor	Lotus-Climax	50	15+12+4=31
NC	5	(United Kingdom) Roy Salvadori	Cooper-Climax	34	10th/Ret, 14 laps, engine
NC	1	(United Kingdom) Stirling Moss	Lotus-Climax	33	2nd/Ret, 11 laps, valve gear
NC	4	(United Kingdom) John Surtees	Lola-Climax	25	5th/Ret, 3 laps, engine
NC	12	(United Kingdom) Graham Hill	BRM	24	1st/DSQ - push start, 2 laps
NC	14	(United Kingdom) Tony Marsh	BRM	24	4th/DSQ - push start, 2 laps
NC	3	(United States) Masten Gregory	Lotus-Climax	18	Ret, 18 laps, front wishbone
NC	11	(Belgium) Lucien Bianchi	ENB-Maserati	15	Ret, 15 laps, engine
NC	9	(Belgium) André Pilette	Emeryson-Climax	8	Ret, 8 laps, engine
NC	6	(United Kingdom) Jim Clark	Lotus-Climax	1	Ret, 1 lap, valve

Previous race: 1962 Cape Grand Prix	Formula One non-championship races 1962 season	Next race: 1962 Lombank Trophy
Previous race: 1961 Brussels Grand Prix	Brussels Grand Prix	Next race: —
