= 1963 Pau Grand Prix =

- Non-championship race in the 1963 Formula One season

Race details
- Date: 15 April 1963
- Official name: XXIII Pau Grand Prix
- Location: Pau Circuit, Pau
- Course: Temporary street circuit
- Course length: 2.758 km (1.714 miles)
- Distance: 100 laps, 275.842 km (171.4 miles)

Pole position
Driver	(United Kingdom) Jim Clark	Lotus-Climax
- Time: 1:30.5

Fastest lap
Driver	(United Kingdom) Jim Clark	Lotus-Climax
- Time: 1:35.5

Podium
First	(United Kingdom) Jim Clark	Lotus-Climax
Second	(United Kingdom) Trevor Taylor	Lotus-Climax
Third	(Switzerland) Heinz Schiller	Porsche

The 23rd Pau Grand Prix was a non-Championship motor race, run to Formula One rules, held on 15 April 1963 at Pau Circuit, the street circuit in Pau. The race was run over 100 laps of the circuit, and was won by Jim Clark in a Lotus 25. Clark and his team-mate Trevor Taylor dominated the race from start to finish, with their nearest rival finishing the race five laps adrift.

== Results ==
Pos	Driver	Entrant	Constructor	Time/Retired	Grid
1	(United Kingdom) Jim Clark	Team Lotus	Lotus-Climax	2.46:59.7	1
2	(United Kingdom) Trevor Taylor	Team Lotus	Lotus-Climax	+ 0.1 s	3
3	(Switzerland) Heinz Schiller	Scuderia Filipinetti	Porsche	95 laps	10
4	(Netherlands) Carel Godin de Beaufort	Ecurie Maarsbergen	Porsche	94 laps	9
5	(Switzerland) Herbert Müller	Scuderia Filipinetti	Lotus-Climax	93 laps	6
6	(Belgium) André Pilette	Tim Parnell	Lotus-Climax	87 laps	15
7	(Switzerland) André Wicky	André Wicky	Cooper-Climax	82 laps	14
Ret	(Sweden) Jo Bonnier	Rob Walker Racing Team	Cooper-Climax	Halfshaft	2
Ret	(United Kingdom) Bob Anderson	DW Racing Enterprises	Lola-Climax	Brakes	11
Ret	(France) Jo Schlesser	Inter-Autocourse	Brabham-Ford	Ignition	8
Ret	(United Kingdom) Tim Parnell	Tim Parnell	Lotus-Climax	Engine	12
Ret	(Switzerland) Jo Siffert	Scuderia Filipinetti	Lotus-BRM	Brakes	4
Ret	(France) Maurice Trintignant	Rob Walker Racing Team	Lotus-Climax	Gear linkage	5
Ret	(France) Bernard Collomb	Bernard Collomb	Lotus-Climax	Fuel tank leak	13
Ret	(United States) Tony Settember	Team Scirocco-Powell	Emeryson-Climax	Accident (suspension)	7
WD	(United States) Masten Gregory	Scuderia Tomaso	De Tomaso	Car not ready	-
WD	(United States) Tony Settember	Team Scirocco-Powell	Scirocco-BRM	Car not ready - drove Emeryson instead	-
WD	(Switzerland) Heini Walter	Scuderia Filipinetti	Porsche	Car not ready	-

Previous race: 1963 Glover Trophy	Formula One non-championship races 1963 season	Next race: 1963 Imola Grand Prix
Previous race: 1962 Pau Grand Prix	Pau Grand Prix	Next race: 1964 Pau Grand Prix
