= Scirocco-Powell =

British racing car constructor

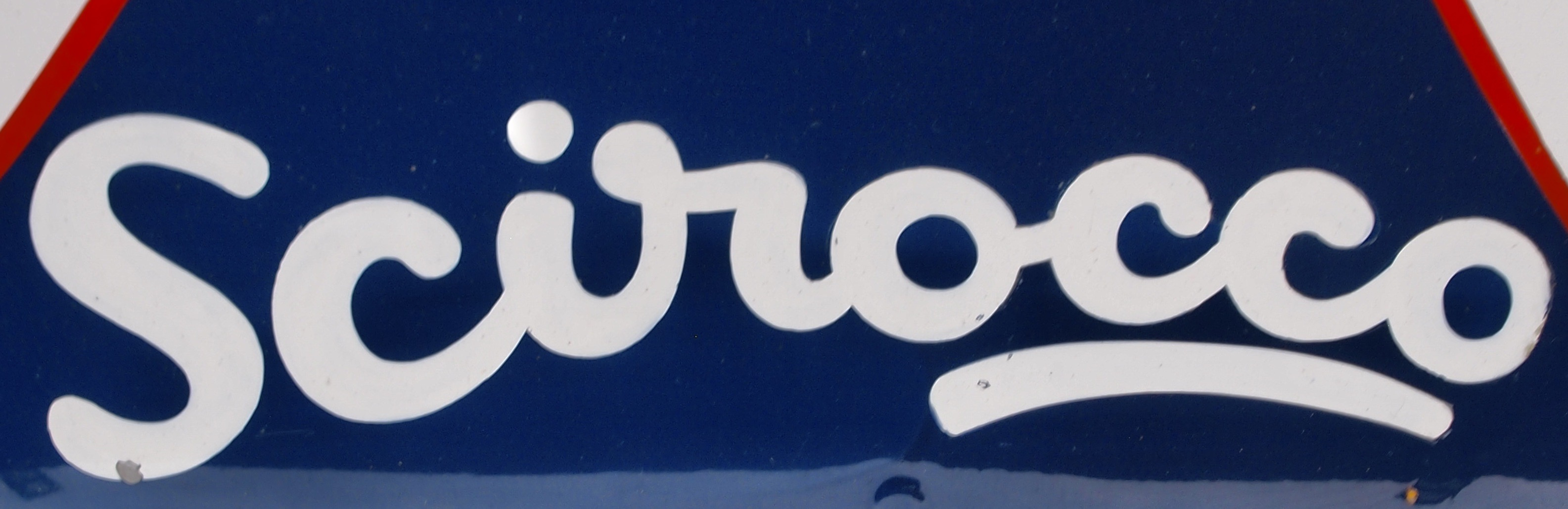
- Founder(s): Hugh Powell
- Noted staff: Tony Settember; Hugh Aiden-Jones; John Tojeiro
- Noted drivers: (United Kingdom) Ian Burgess (United States) Tony Settember

Formula One World Championship career
- First entry: 1963 Belgian Grand Prix
- Races entered: 7
- Engines: BRM
- Constructors' Championships: 0
- Drivers' Championships: 0
- Race victories: 0
- Podiums: 0
- Points: 0
- Pole positions: 0
- Fastest laps: 0
- Final entry: 1963 Italian Grand Prix

Scirocco-Powell was a Formula One constructor from the United Kingdom. The team was founded by Hugh Powell after he purchased the assets of another UK-based racing unit, Emeryson. They participated in seven World Championship Grands Prix, entering a total of nine races, as well as numerous non-Championship Grands Prix, but failed to score a point. Scirocco also provided chassis for private entrants.

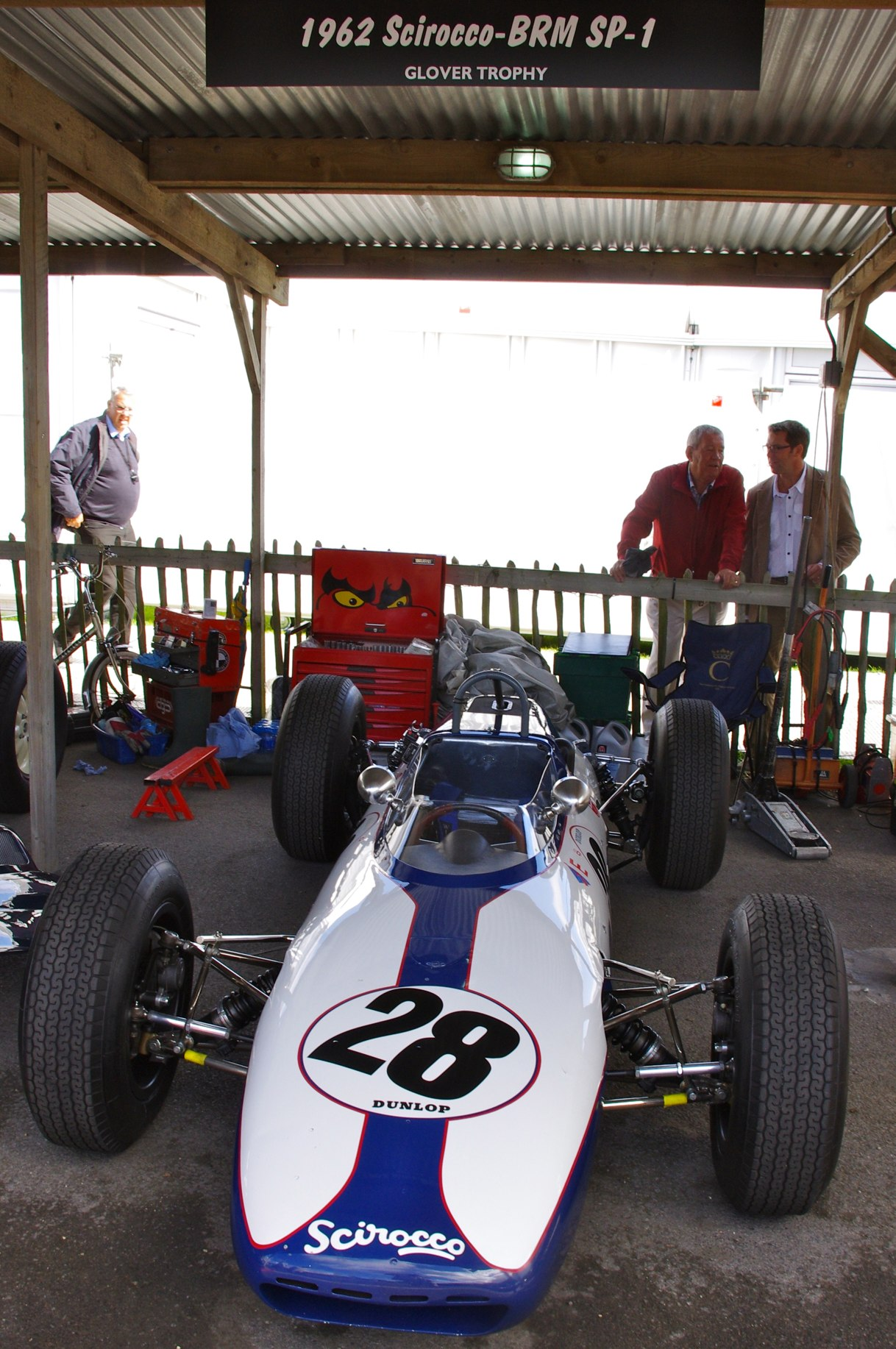
Scirocco SP

== Complete Formula One results ==
=== World Championship results ===
(key)

Year	Team	Chassis	Engine	Tyres	Drivers	1	2	3	4	5	6	7	8	9	10	Points	WCC
1963	Scirocco Racing Cars	Scirocco 02	BRM	D		MON	BEL	NED	FRA	GBR	GER	ITA	USA	MEX	RSA	0	-
1963	Scirocco Racing Cars	Scirocco 02	BRM	D	(United Kingdom) Ian Burgess	WD	WD	WD	WD	Ret	Ret	WD				0	-
1963	Scirocco Racing Cars	Scirroco 01	BRM	D	(United States) Tony Settember	WD	Ret	WD	Ret	Ret	Ret	DNQ				0	-
1964	Equipe Scirocco Belge	Scirocco 02	Coventry Climax	D		MON	NED	BEL	FRA	GBR	GER	AUT	ITA	USA	MEX	0	-
1964	Equipe Scirocco Belge	Scirocco 02	Coventry Climax	D	(Belgium) André Pilette	WD		Ret			DNQ		WD			0	-

=== Non-championship results ===
(key)

Year	Entrant	Chassis	Engine	Drivers	1	2	3	4	5	6	7	8	9	10	11	12	13	14
1963	Scirocco Racing Cars	Scirocco SP	BRM		LOM	GLV	PAU	IMO	SYR	AIN	INT	ROM	SOL	KAN	MED	AUT	OUL	RAN
1963	Scirocco Racing Cars	Scirocco SP	BRM	(United States) Tony Settember			WD				WD		Ret	Ret		2	Ret	
1963	Scirocco Racing Cars	Scirocco SP	BRM	(Mexico) Pedro Rodriguez							WD							
1963	Scirocco Racing Cars	Scirocco SP	BRM	(United Kingdom) Ian Burgess									Ret	Ret		Ret	8	
1964	Equipe Scirocco Belge	Scirocco SP	Coventry Climax		DMT	NWT	SYR	AIN	INT	SOL	MED	RAN						
1964	Equipe Scirocco Belge	Scirocco SP	Coventry Climax	(Belgium) André Pilette	7	6	Ret	11			8							
