= 1962 Solitude Grand Prix =

- Non-championship race in the 1962 Formula One season
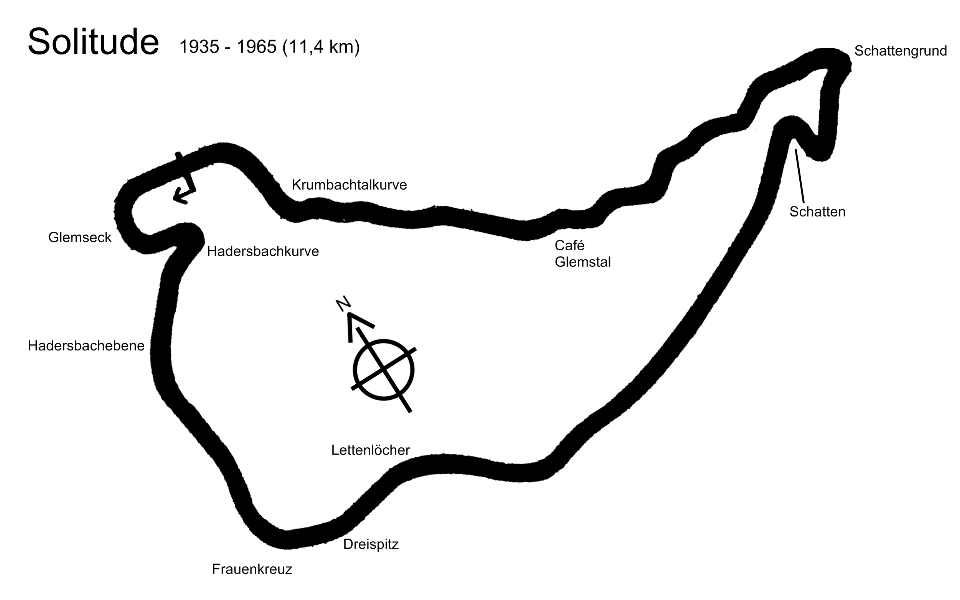

Race details
- Date: 15 July 1962
- Official name: XII Großer Preis der Solitude
- Location: Solitudering, near Stuttgart
- Course: Permanent racing facility
- Course length: 11.4086 km (7.089 miles)
- Distance: 25 laps, 285.216 km (177.225 miles)
- Attendance: 320,000

Pole position
Driver	(United Kingdom) Jim Clark	Lotus-Climax
- Time: 3:53.9

Fastest lap
Driver	(United States) Dan Gurney	Porsche
- Time: 3:55.6

Podium
First	(United States) Dan Gurney	Porsche
Second	(Sweden) Jo Bonnier	Porsche
Third	(United Kingdom) Trevor Taylor	Lotus-Climax

The 12th Solitude Grand Prix was a non-Championship motor race, run to Formula One rules, held on 15 July 1962 at the Solitudering, near Stuttgart. The race was run over 25 laps of the circuit, and was won by Dan Gurney in a Porsche 804.

== Race Report ==
The 1961 Solitude Grand Prix had been very exciting, and 320,000 people showed up in 1962 for a new record attendance. However, the race proved less than exciting, with only Lotus and Porsche sending their cars in addition to numerous privateers. Ferrari and Scuderia SSS Venezia stayed away due to the ongoing Italian metal workers' strike, while UDT/Laystall and Yeoman Credit Racing both stayed home to repair cars damaged in the 1962 French Grand Prix.

Jo Bonnier was hindered at the start by a photographer on the track, and the race began with Gurney leading Clark, then Bonnier, and then Trevor Taylor. These positions remained unchanged until just past the middle of the race, when there was a rainsquall and all of the oil and rubber deposits on the track made for very slippery conditions. Clark slipped backwards into a fence and had to retire with a damaged exhaust and rear end. Taylor also slipped off the track a few times, and the tempo dropped steadily. As an indication thereof, Gurney's average speed for the first fifteen laps was 173 km/h (107 mph) while it was only 145.75 km/h (91 mph) for the last ten. Ian Burgess' Cooper-special was best privateer in fourth. Jo Siffert had an electric short which led to a small fire. Luckily for the spectators, Solitude also hosted the German Motorcycle Grand Prix and there was a GT-race, won by Kalman von Czazy in a Ferrari 250GTO which he had crashed during practice.

== Results ==
Pos	Driver	Entrant	Constructor	Time/Retired	Grid
1	(United States) Dan Gurney	Porsche System Engineering	Porsche	1.45:37.2	2
2	(Sweden) Jo Bonnier	Porsche System Engineering	Porsche	+ 1:47.1 s	3
3	(United Kingdom) Trevor Taylor	Team Lotus	Lotus-Climax	+ 3:55.1 s	4
4	(United Kingdom) Ian Burgess	Anglo-American Equipe	Cooper-Climax	24 laps	7
5	(Netherlands) Carel Godin de Beaufort	Ecurie Maarsbergen	Porsche	23 laps	8
6	(West Germany) Gerhard Mitter	Ecurie Filipinetti	Lotus-Climax	23 laps	14
7	(Switzerland) Heinz Schiller	Ecurie Filipinetti	Porsche	23 laps	11
8	(France) Bernard Collomb	Bernard Collomb	Cooper-Climax	19 laps	12
Ret	(United Kingdom) Jim Clark	Team Lotus	Lotus-Climax	Accident	1
NC	(West Germany) Günther Seiffert	Autosport Team Wolfgang Seidel	Lotus-Climax	18 laps	13
Ret	(United States) Tony Settember	Emeryson Cars	Emeryson-Climax	Oil leak	9
Ret	(United Kingdom) Tony Marsh	Tony Marsh	BRM-Climax	Clutch	6
Ret	(West Germany) Kurt Kuhnke	Autosport Team Wolfgang Seidel	Lotus-Climax	Engine	10
Ret	(Switzerland) Jo Siffert	Ecurie Filipinetti	Lotus-BRM	Electrics	5
DNS	(United Kingdom) John Campbell-Jones	Emeryson Cars	Emeryson-Climax	Practice accident	-
WD	(United Kingdom) Peter Arundell	Team Lotus	Lotus-Climax	No car	-
WD	(Italy) Nino Vaccarella	Scuderia SSS Republica di Venezia	Porsche		-
WD	(Italy) Carlo Abate	Scuderia SSS Republica di Venezia	Porsche		-
WD	(United Kingdom) Innes Ireland	UDT Laystall Racing Team	Lotus-Climax		-
WD	(United States) Masten Gregory	UDT Laystall Racing Team	Lotus-BRM		-
WD	(United Kingdom) John Surtees	Bowmaker Racing Team	Lola-Climax		-
WD	(West Germany) Wolfgang Seidel	Autosport Team Wolfgang Seidel	Lotus-BRM	No car	-

- Porsche System Engineering entered a third car but no driver was assigned and the entry was not used.

Previous race: 1962 Reims Grand Prix	Formula One non-championship races 1962 season	Next race: 1962 Kanonloppet
Previous race: 1961 Solitude Grand Prix	Solitude Grand Prix	Next race: 1963 Solitude Grand Prix
