= Scuderia Filipinetti =

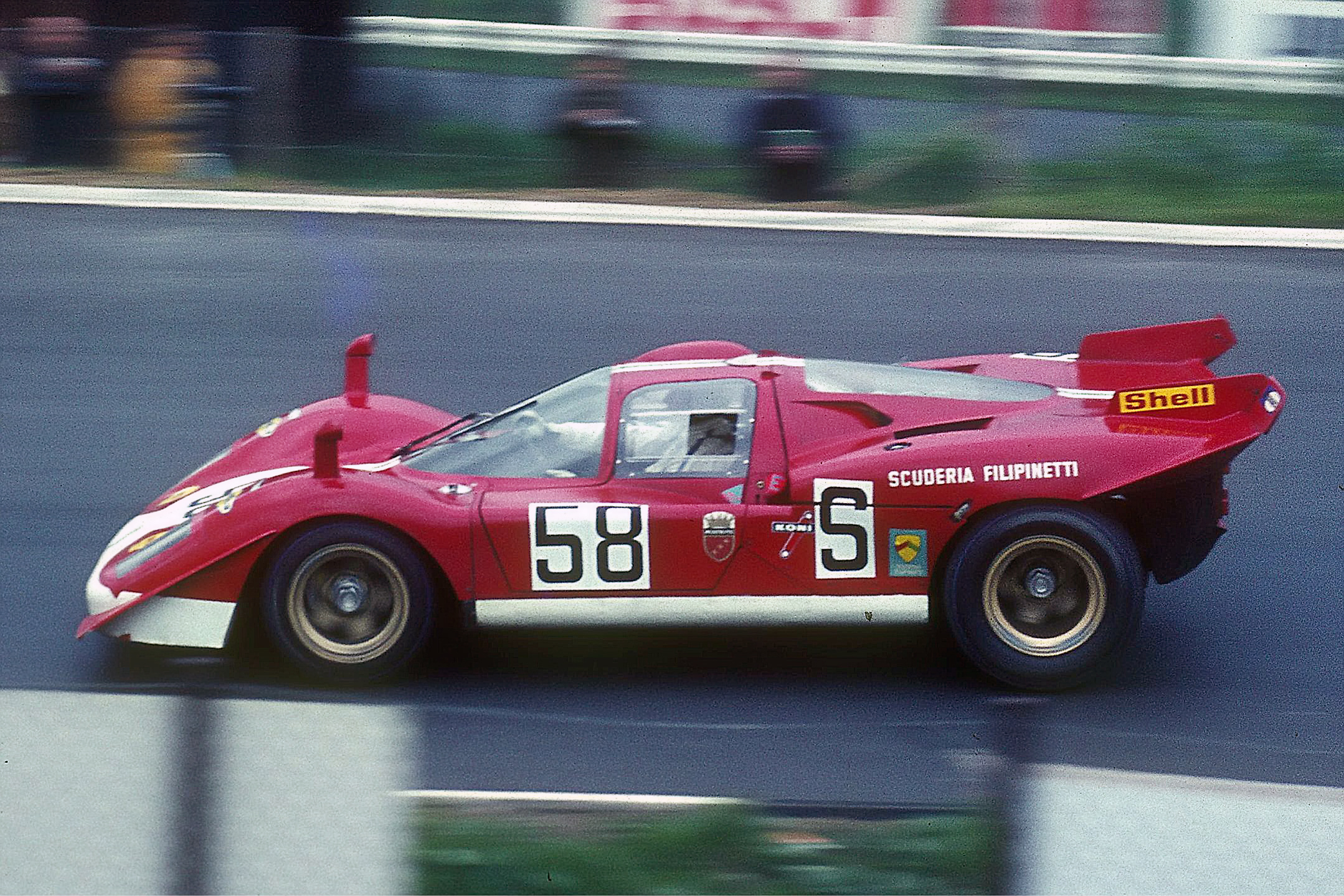
Mike Parkes driving for Scuderia Filipinetti in 1970

Scuderia Filipinetti (also French name Ecurie Filipinetti) was a Swiss motor racing team that competed in sports car racing and occasionally in Formula One between 1962 and 1973. It was founded by Ferrari cars Swiss importer and former President of the Swiss Karting federation Georges Filipinetti (1907-1973) to give Swiss drivers a chance to progress into professional racing. Amongst them were Herbert Müller, Heinz Schiller and Jo Siffert. Filippinetti also employed many other drivers including Jim Clark, Phil Hill and Ronnie Peterson. The team was initially named Ecurie Nationale Suisse, but Filipinetti changed it after complaints from the Automobile Club de Suisse.

The team ran its cars in a red and white livery and most often used Ferrari cars, although it also employed cars from other manufacturers like FIAT, Chevrolet and, for Formula One racing, Lotus. The team's 1968 Chevrolet Corvette L88 made its Le Mans debut in 1968 and returned for the 24 Hours of Le Mans five more times – consecutively – until 1973, a record that remains unbroken by any single chassis. Écurie Filipinetti's most successful season was 1966, when Willy Mairesse and Herbert Müller won the 50th edition of the Targa Florio, in a Porsche 906 entered by the team. In that same year Mairesse and Müller finished third in the 6 Hours of Monza, sharing a Ford GT40.

The team had planned to enter the 1973 Formula One season with a McLaren M23 to be driven by Swiss driver Bruno Pescia. The project was abandoned after Georges Filipinetti's death on 3 May 1973.

== Drivers ==
Noted drivers who drove from Scuderia Filipinetti between 1962 and 1973:

- Jim Clark
- Phil Hill
- Ronnie Peterson
- Jo Siffert
- Herbert Müller
- Willy Mairesse
- Jo Bonnier
- Nino Vaccarella
- Dieter Spoerry
- Mike Parkes
- Walter Donna
- Philippe Albera
- André Wicky

== Complete Formula One World Championship results ==
(key)

Year	Chassis	Engine	Tyres	Drivers	1	2	3	4	5	6	7	8	9	10
1962	Lotus21; Lotus 24; Porsche 718	Climax FPF 1.5 L4; BRM P56 1.5 V8; Porsche 547/3 1.5 F4	D		NED	MON	BEL	FRA	GBR	GER	ITA	USA	RSA	
1962	Lotus21; Lotus 24; Porsche 718	Climax FPF 1.5 L4; BRM P56 1.5 V8; Porsche 547/3 1.5 F4	D	(Switzerland) Jo Siffert			10	Ret		12	DNQ			
1962	Lotus21; Lotus 24; Porsche 718	Climax FPF 1.5 L4; BRM P56 1.5 V8; Porsche 547/3 1.5 F4	D	(Switzerland) Heinz Schiller						Ret				
1962	Lotus21; Lotus 24; Porsche 718	Climax FPF 1.5 L4; BRM P56 1.5 V8; Porsche 547/3 1.5 F4	D	(Switzerland) Heini Walter						14				
1963	Lotus 24	BRM P56 1.5 V8	D		MON	BEL	NED	FRA	GBR	GER	ITA	USA	MEX	RSA
1963	Lotus 24	BRM P56 1.5 V8	D	(United States) Phil Hill				NC						

== Bibliography ==
- Robert Weber (June 2022). Automobilsport Racing / History / Passion #32: Scuderia Filipinetti 1962–1973. Sportfahrer Verlag. ISSN 2199-126X.
