= 1963 Austrian Grand Prix =

- Non-championship race in the 1963 Formula One season
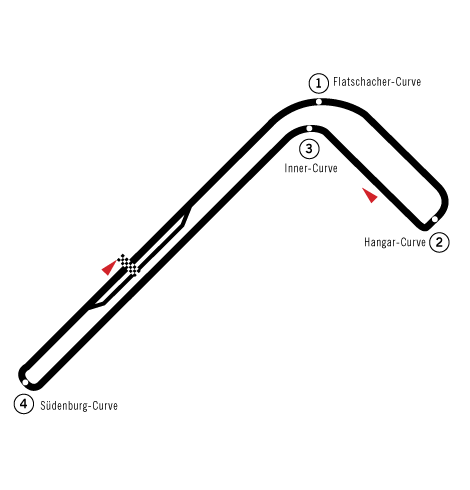

Race details
- Date: 1 September 1963
- Official name: I Großer Preis von Österreich
- Location: Zeltweg Airfield
- Course: Temporary airport facility
- Course length: 3.186 km (1.980 miles)
- Distance: 80 laps, 254.92 km (158.4 miles)

Pole position
Driver	(United Kingdom) Jim Clark	Lotus-Climax
- Time: 1:10.2

Fastest lap
Driver	(Australia) Jack Brabham	Brabham-Climax
- Time: 1:11.4

Podium
First	(Australia) Jack Brabham	Brabham-Climax
Second	(United States) Tony Settember	Scirocco-BRM
Third	(Netherlands) Carel Godin de Beaufort	Porsche

The 1st Austrian Grand Prix was a motor race, run to Formula One rules, held on 1 September 1963 at the Zeltweg Airfield. The race was run over 80 laps of the circuit, and was won by Australian driver Jack Brabham in a Brabham BT3, finishing a massive five laps ahead of the next finisher. Many competitors retired after the rough surface of the track caused mechanical failures.

This race marked the Formula One debut of 1970 World Champion Jochen Rindt, and also the only Formula One appearance of his compatriot Kurt Bardi-Barry, who was killed in a road accident in February 1964.

== Results ==
Pos	Driver	Entrant	Constructor	Time/Retired	Grid
1	(Australia) Jack Brabham	Brabham Racing Organisation	Brabham-Climax	1.09:06.3	2
2	(United States) Tony Settember	Scirocco-Powell (Racing Cars)	Scirocco-BRM	75 laps	8
3	(Netherlands) Carel Godin de Beaufort	Ecurie Maarsbergen	Porsche	75 laps	10
4	(New Zealand) Chris Amon	Reg Parnell (Racing)	Lola-Climax	71 laps	6
5	(France) Bernard Collomb	Bernard Collomb	Lotus-Climax	Suspension (71 laps)	11
6	(United Kingdom) Tim Parnell	Tim Parnell	Lotus-BRM	70 laps	17
7	(Germany) Günther Seiffert	Rhine-Ruhr Racing Team	Lotus-BRM	68 laps	14
8	(United Kingdom) Innes Ireland	British Racing Partnership	Lotus-BRM	Cam follower (64 laps)	4
9	(Belgium) André Pilette	Tim Parnell	Lotus-Climax	64 laps	15
Ret	(Switzerland) Jo Siffert	Siffert Racing Team	Lotus-BRM	Fuel pump mounting	7
Ret	(Sweden) Jo Bonnier	Rob Walker Racing Team	Cooper-Climax	Ignition	5
Ret	(Austria) Jochen Rindt	Jochen Rindt	Cooper-Ford	Con-rod	12
Ret	(Italy) Ernesto Prinoth	Scuderia Jolly Club	Lotus-Climax	Suspension	9
Ret	(United Kingdom) Jim Clark	Team Lotus	Lotus-Climax	Oil pipe	1
Ret	(United States) Jim Hall	British Racing Partnership	Lotus-BRM	Engine	3
Ret	(Austria) Kurt Bardi-Barry	Ecurie Maarsbergen	Porsche	Withdrew	16
Ret	(United Kingdom) Ian Burgess	Scirocco-Powell (Racing Cars)	Scirocco-BRM	Con-rod	13
WD	(United Kingdom) Peter Arundell	Team Lotus	Lotus-Climax	Contract dispute	-
WD	(United Kingdom) John Campbell-Jones	Reg Parnell (Racing)	Lola-Climax	Car not ready	-

Previous race: 1963 Mediterranean Grand Prix	Formula One non-championship races 1963 season	Next race: 1963 International Gold Cup
Previous race: None	Austrian Grand Prix	Next race: 1964 Austrian Grand Prix
