= 1962 Naples Grand Prix =

- Non-championship race in the 1962 Formula One season
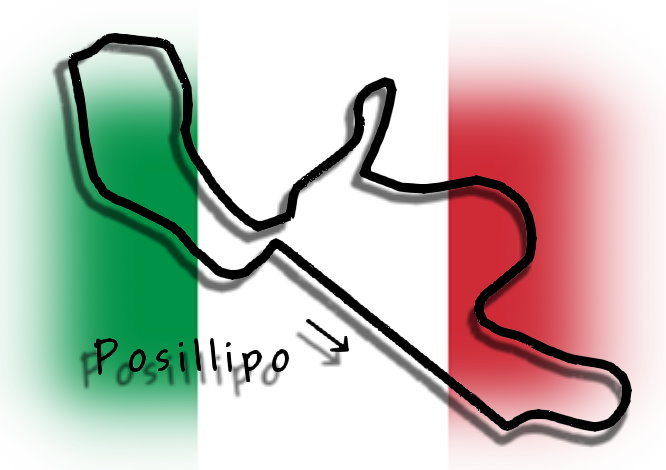

Race details
- Date: 20 May 1962
- Official name: XX Gran Premio di Napoli
- Location: Posillipo Circuit, Posillipo, Naples
- Course: Street circuit
- Course length: 2.491 km (1.548 miles)
- Distance: 60 laps, 149.444 km (92.86 miles)

Pole position
| Driver | (Italy) Lorenzo Bandini | Ferrari |
- Time: 1:18.7

Fastest lap
| Drivers | (Belgium) Willy Mairesse | Ferrari |
| | (Italy) Lorenzo Bandini | Ferrari |
- Time: 1:17.7

Podium
| First | (Belgium) Willy Mairesse | Ferrari |
| Second | (Italy) Lorenzo Bandini | Ferrari |
| Third | (United Kingdom) Keith Greene | Gilby-Climax |

The 20th Naples Grand Prix was a motor race, run for cars complying with the Formula One rules, held on 20 May 1962 at Posillipo Circuit, Naples. The race was run over 60 laps of the circuit, and was won by Belgian driver Willy Mairesse in a Ferrari 156.

This race was held on the same day as the 1962 Dutch Grand Prix, and consequently many of the top drivers at that time were not present in Naples. Only the 10 fastest cars in qualifying were allowed to start the race, leaving a number of the more unusual entrants on the sidelines. The two Ferraris were dominant throughout the weekend, with Lorenzo Bandini leading from the start of the race until lap 24, when he was passed by Mairesse, who led until the end. Carlo Abate finished fourth in his first Formula One race, narrowly beaten by Keith Greene.

== Qualifying ==
| Pos | No. | Driver | Constructor | Lap | Gap |
|---|---|---|---|---|---|
| 1 | 6 | (Italy) Lorenzo Bandini | Ferrari | 1:18.7 | — |
| 2 | 10 | (Belgium) Willy Mairesse | Ferrari | 1:18.9 | +0.2 |
| 3 | 12 | (United Kingdom) Keith Greene | Gilby-Climax | 1:21.2 | +2.5 |
| 4 | 14 | (United Kingdom) Tim Parnell | Lotus-Climax | 1:21.2 | +2.5 |
| 5 | 4 | (United Kingdom) Ian Burgess | Cooper-Climax | 1:22.4 | +3.7 |
| 6 | 2 | (New Zealand) Tony Shelly | Lotus-Climax | 1:22.9 | +4.2 |
| 7 | 32 | (Italy) Carlo Abate | Porsche | 1:23.3 | +4.6 |
| 8 | 24 | (United States) Tony Settember | Emeryson-Climax | 1:23.4 | +4.7 |
| 9 | 46 | (United Kingdom) David Piper | Lotus-Climax | 1:24.4 | +5.7 |
| 10 | 26 | (Italy) Gaetano Starrabba | Lotus-Maserati | 1:25.1 | +6.4 |
| 11 | 42 | (United Kingdom) Graham Eden | Emeryson-Climax | 1:26.8 | +8.1 |
| 12 | 18 | (Italy) Roberto Lippi | De Tomaso-O.S.C.A. | 1:27.0 | +8.3 |
| 13 | 8 | (United States) Jay Chamberlain | Lotus-Climax | 1:27.1 | +8.4 |
| 14 | 40 | (Switzerland) Heinz Schiller | Porsche | 1:27.2 | +8.5 |
| 15 | 34 | (France) Maurice Caillet | Cegga-Maserati | 1:28.1 | +9.4 |
| 16 | 38 | (Italy) Gastone Zanarotti | De Tomaso-O.S.C.A. | 1:29.6 | +10.9 |
| 17 | 48 | (Germany) Günther Seiffert | Lotus-Climax | 1:33.0 | +14.3 |

== Results ==
| Pos | No. | Driver | Entrant | Constructor | Laps | Time/Retired | Grid |
|---|---|---|---|---|---|---|---|
| 1 | 10 | (Belgium) Willy Mairesse | SEFAC Ferrari | Ferrari | 60 | 1.19:36.1 | 2 |
| 2 | 6 | (Italy) Lorenzo Bandini | SEFAC Ferrari | Ferrari | 60 | +3.3 s | 1 |
| 3 | 12 | (United Kingdom) Keith Greene | Gilby Engineering | Gilby-Climax | 59 | + 1 Lap | 3 |
| 4 | 32 | (Italy) Carlo Abate | Scuderia SSS Republica di Venezia | Porsche | 59 | + 1 Lap | 7 |
| 5 | 4 | (United Kingdom) Ian Burgess | Anglo-American Equipe | Cooper-Climax | 58 | + 2 Laps | 5 |
| 6 | 2 | (New Zealand) Tony Shelly | John Dalton | Lotus-Climax | 58 | + 2 Laps | 6 |
| 7 | 14 | (United Kingdom) Tim Parnell | Tim Parnell | Lotus-Climax | 55 | + 5 Laps | 4 |
| 8 | 46 | (United Kingdom) David Piper | David Piper | Lotus-Climax | 51 | + 9 Laps | 9 |
| 9 | 24 | (United States) Tony Settember | Emeryson Cars | Emeryson-Climax | 50 | + 10 Laps | 8 |
| Ret | 26 | (Italy) Gaetano Starrabba | Gaetano Starrabba | Lotus-Maserati | 0 | Half-shaft | 10 |
| DNQ | 42 | (United Kingdom) Graham Eden | Graham Eden | Emeryson-Climax | | - | |
| DNQ | 18 | (Italy) Roberto Lippi | Scuderia Settecolli | De Tomaso-O.S.C.A. | | - | |
| DNQ | 8 | (United States) Jay Chamberlain | Jay Chamberlain | Lotus-Climax | | - | |
| DNQ | 40 | (Switzerland) Heinz Schiller | Scuderia Filipinetti | Porsche | | - | |
| DNQ | 34 | (France) Maurice Caillet | Ets Cegga | Cegga-Maserati | | - | |
| DNQ | 38 | (Italy) Gastone Zanarotti | Scuderia Tomaso | De Tomaso-O.S.C.A. | | - | |
| DNQ | 48 | (Germany) Günther Seiffert | Autosport Team Wolfgang Seidel | Lotus-Climax | | - | |
| DNA | 16 | (United Kingdom) John Campbell-Jones | Emeryson Cars | Emeryson-Climax | Car at Zandvoort | - | |
| DNA | 20 | (Italy) Dino Govoni | Dino Govoni | Emeryson-Maserati | Withdrew | - | |
| DNA | 22 | (Italy) Umberto Filotico | Umberto Filotico | Cooper-Climax | Withdrew | - | |
| DNA | 28 | (Switzerland) "Wal Ever" | "Wal Ever" | Cooper | Withdrew | - | |
| DNA | 36 | (Switzerland) Jo Siffert | Scuderia Filipinetti | Lotus-Climax | Withdrew | - | |

| Previous race: 1962 BRDC International Trophy | Formula One non-championship races 1962 season | Next race: 1962 International 2000 Guineas |
| Previous race: 1961 Naples Grand Prix | Naples Grand Prix | Next race: — |
