= 1963 International Gold Cup =

- Non-championship race in the 1963 Formula One season

Race details
- Date: 21 September 1963
- Official name: X Gold Cup
- Location: Oulton Park, Cheshire
- Course: Permanent racing facility
- Course length: 4.4434 km (2.761 miles)
- Distance: 73 laps, 324.25 km (201.48 miles)

Pole position
Driver	(United Kingdom) Jim Clark	Lotus-Climax
- Time: 1:39.0

Fastest lap
Driver	(United Kingdom) Jim Clark	Lotus-Climax
- Time: 1:39.2

Podium
First	(United Kingdom) Jim Clark	Lotus-Climax
Second	(United States) Richie Ginther	BRM
Third	(United Kingdom) Graham Hill	BRM

The 10th Gold Cup was a motor race, run to Formula One rules, held on 21 September 1963 at Oulton Park, England. The race was run over 73 laps of the circuit, and was won by British driver Jim Clark in a Lotus 25.

This race was the Formula One debut for American driver Peter Revson, and the only Formula One start for Mike Beckwith.

== Results ==
Pos	Driver	Entrant	Constructor	Time/Retired	Grid
1	(United Kingdom) Jim Clark	Team Lotus	Lotus-Climax	2.02:58.6	1
2	(United States) Richie Ginther	Owen Racing Organisation	BRM	+ 22.6 s	3
3	(United Kingdom) Graham Hill	Owen Racing Organisation	BRM	+ 28.2 s	2
4	(Australia) Jack Brabham	Brabham Racing Organisation	Brabham-Climax	+ 52.0 s	11
5	(South Africa) Tony Maggs	Cooper Car Company	Cooper-Climax	72 laps	6
6	(New Zealand) Bruce McLaren	Cooper	Cooper-Climax	72 laps	7
7	(United Kingdom) Mike Hailwood	Reg Parnell (Racing)	Lola-Climax	70 laps	9
8	(United Kingdom) Ian Burgess	Scirocco-Powell (Racing Cars)	Scirocco-BRM	69 laps	18
9	(United States) Peter Revson	Reg Parnell (Racing)	Lotus-BRM	69 laps	15
10	(Netherlands) Carel Godin de Beaufort	Ecurie Maarsbergen	Porsche	67 laps	20
11	(Switzerland) Jo Siffert	Siffert Racing Team	Lotus-BRM	Engine (66 laps)	12
12	(Belgium) André Pilette	André Pilette	Lotus-Climax	63 laps	21
13	(United Kingdom) Innes Ireland	British Racing Partnership	Lotus-BRM	Oil pressure (56 laps)	5
14	(France) Bernard Collomb	Bernard Collomb	Lotus-Climax	Oil pressure (46 laps)	19
Ret	(United Kingdom) Ian Raby	Ian Raby (Racing)	Gilby-BRM	Ignition	13
Ret	(United States) Dan Gurney	Brabham Racing Organisation	Brabham-Climax	Oil leak	16
Ret	(United Kingdom) Mike Beckwith	British Racing Partnership	Lotus-BRM	Accident	17
Ret	(United States) Masten Gregory	Tim Parnell	Lotus-BRM	Cam follower	14
Ret	(United Kingdom) Trevor Taylor	Team Lotus	Lotus-Climax	Crownwheel & pinion	4
Ret	(Sweden) Jo Bonnier	Rob Walker Racing Team	Cooper-Climax	Oil pressure	8
Ret	(United States) Tony Settember	Scirocco-Powell (Racing Cars)	Scirocco-BRM	Valve gear	22
Ret	(United Kingdom) Bob Anderson	DW Racing Enterprises	Lola-Climax	Gearbox	10
WD	(United Kingdom) Peter Arundell	Team Lotus	Lotus-Climax	Car not ready	-

Previous race: 1963 Austrian Grand Prix	Formula One non-championship races 1963 season	Next race: 1963 Rand Grand Prix
Previous race: 1962 International Gold Cup	Oulton Park International Gold Cup	Next race: 1964 International Gold Cup
