= 1962 International Gold Cup =

- Non-championship race in the 1962 Formula One season

Race details
- Date: 1 September 1962
- Official name: IX Gold Cup
- Location: Oulton Park, Cheshire
- Course: Permanent racing facility
- Course length: 4.4434 km (2.761 miles)
- Distance: 73 laps, 324.25 km (201.48 miles)

Pole position
Driver	(United States) Richie Ginther	BRM
- Time: 1:38.6

Fastest lap
Driver	(United Kingdom) Jim Clark	Lotus-Climax
- Time: 1:40.0

Podium
First	(United Kingdom) Jim Clark	Lotus-Climax
Second	(United Kingdom) Graham Hill	BRM
Third	(Australia) Jack Brabham	Brabham-Climax

The 9th Gold Cup was a motor race, run for Formula One cars, held on 1 September 1962 at Oulton Park, England. The race was run over 73 laps of the circuit, and was won by British driver Jim Clark in a Lotus 25.

== Grid ==
_______1_______ Richie Ginther 1:38.6		_______2_______ Jim Clark 1:38.6		_______3_______ Graham Hill 1:39.0		_______4_______ Bruce McLaren 1:40.0
	_______5_______ Jack Brabham 1:40.4		_______6_______ John Surtees 1:40.4		_______7_______ Innes Ireland 1:40.8
_______8_______ Roy Salvadori 1:41.0		_______9_______ Bruce Johnstone 1:42.0		_______10_______ Trevor Taylor 1:42.2		_______11_______ Gary Hocking 1:43.2
	_______12_______ Jo Bonnier 1:45.4		_______13_______ Masten Gregory 1:45.6		_______14_______ Tony Shelly 1:45.6
_______15_______ Ian Burgess 1:45.8		_______16_______ Philip Robinson 1:46.0		_______17_______ Jack Lewis 1:46.6		_______18_______ Carel Godin de Beaufort 1:47.0
	_______19_______ Gerry Ashmore 1:48.8		_______20_______ Wolfgang Seidel: -- ---		_______21_______ Graham Eden 1:54.0
_______22_______ Günther Seifert 1:56.4		_______23_______ Bernard Collomb 2:00.2		_______24_______ Tony Settember: -- ---		_______25_______ Keith Greene: -- ---

== Results ==
Pos	Driver	Entrant	Constructor	Time/Retired	Grid
1	(United Kingdom) Jim Clark	Team Lotus	Lotus-Climax	2.03:46.6	2
2	(United Kingdom) Graham Hill	Owen Racing Organisation	BRM	+ 1:17.6 s	3
3	(Australia) Jack Brabham	Brabham Racing Organisation	Brabham-Climax	70 laps	5
4	(South Africa) Bruce Johnstone	Owen Racing Organisation	BRM	70 laps	9
5	(New Zealand) Tony Shelly	John Dalton	Lotus-Climax	69 laps	14
6	(United States) Masten Gregory	UDT-Laystall Racing Team	Lotus-BRM	69 laps	13
7	(Netherlands) Carel Godin de Beaufort	Ecurie Maarsbergen	Porsche	68 laps	18
8	(United Kingdom) Gerry Ashmore	Gerry Ashmore	Lotus-Climax	67 laps	19
9	(France) Bernard Collomb	Bernard Collomb	Cooper-Climax	61 laps	23
10	(Germany) Günther Seiffert	Autosport Team Wolfgang Seidel	Lotus-Climax	50 laps	22
Ret	(Federation of Rhodesia and Nyasaland) Gary Hocking	Tim Parnell	Lotus-Climax	Oil pipe	11
Ret	(United Kingdom) Ian Burgess	Anglo-American Equipe	Cooper Special-Climax	Oil pipe	15
Ret	(New Zealand) Bruce McLaren	Cooper	Cooper-Climax	Fire	4
Ret	(United Kingdom) John Surtees	Bowmaker Racing Team	Lola-Climax	Valve	6
Ret	(United States) Richie Ginther	Owen Racing Organisation	BRM	Piston	1
Ret	(United Kingdom) Jack Lewis	Ecurie Galloise	Cooper-Climax	Lost wheel	17
Ret	(United Kingdom) Graham Eden	Gerry Ashmore	Lotus-Climax	Engine	21
Ret	(United Kingdom) Innes Ireland	UDT-Laystall Racing Team	Lotus-Climax	Clutch	7
Ret	(United Kingdom) Keith Greene	Gilby Engineering	Gilby-BRM	Gearbox oil leak	25
Ret	(United Kingdom) Roy Salvadori	Bowmaker Racing Team	Lola-Climax	Throttle	8
Ret	(United Kingdom) Trevor Taylor	Team Lotus	Lotus-Climax	Gearbox	10
Ret	(Sweden) Jo Bonnier	Rob Walker Racing Team	Lotus-Climax	Gearbox	12
Ret	(United Kingdom) Philip Robinson	A. Robinson & Sons	Lotus-Climax	Engine	16
EX	(Germany) Wolfgang Seidel	Autosport Team Wolfgang Seidel	Lotus-BRM	Licence revoked	(20)
DNS	(United States) Tony Settember	Emeryson Cars	Emeryson-Climax	Withdrawn after practice	(24)
WD	(United Kingdom) Chris Ashmore	Gerry Ashmore	Lotus-Climax	No car	-

Previous race: 1962 Danish Grand Prix	Formula One non-championship races 1962 season	Next race: 1962 Mexican Grand Prix
Previous race: 1961 International Gold Cup	Oulton Park International Gold Cup	Next race: 1963 International Gold Cup
