= 1962 Pau Grand Prix =

- Non-championship race in the 1962 Formula One season

Race details
- Date: 23 April 1962
- Official name: XXII Pau Grand Prix
- Location: Pau Circuit, Pau
- Course: Temporary street circuit
- Course length: 2.758 km (1.714 miles)
- Distance: 100 laps, 275.842 km (171.4 miles)

Pole position
Driver	(United Kingdom) Jim Clark	Lotus-Climax
- Time: 1:30.6

Fastest lap
Driver	(United Kingdom) Jim Clark	Lotus-Climax
- Time: 1:33.4

Podium
First	(France) Maurice Trintignant	Lotus-Climax
Second	(Mexico) Ricardo Rodríguez	Ferrari
Third	(United Kingdom) Jack Lewis	BRM

The 22nd Pau Grand Prix was a non-Championship motor race, run for Formula One cars, held on 23 April 1962 at Pau Circuit, the street circuit in Pau. The race was run over 100 laps of the circuit, and was won by Maurice Trintignant in a Lotus 18/21, run by the Rob Walker Racing Team.

== Results ==
Pos	Driver	Entrant	Constructor	Time/Retired	Grid
1	(France) Maurice Trintignant	Rob Walker Racing Team	Lotus 18/21-Climax	2.39:35.5	5
2	(Mexico) Ricardo Rodríguez	SEFAC Ferrari	Ferrari 156	+ 33.6 s	2
3	(United Kingdom) Jack Lewis	Ecurie Galloise	BRM P57	+ 34.6 s	7
4	(United Kingdom) Tony Marsh	Owen Racing Organisation	BRM P57	99 laps	8
5	(Italy) Lorenzo Bandini	SEFAC Ferrari	Ferrari 156	99 laps	6
6	(Italy) Nino Vaccarella	Scuderia SSS Republica di Venezia	Lotus 18/21-Climax	98 laps	11
7	(Switzerland) Jo Siffert	Ecurie Nationale Suisse	Lotus 21-Climax	97 laps	14
8	(United Kingdom) Ian Burgess	Anglo-American Equipe	Aiden-Cooper T59-Climax	95 laps	13
9	(Switzerland) Heinz Schiller	Ecurie Nationale Suisse	Porsche 718/2	95 laps	15
10	(France) Jo Schlesser	Ecurie Lausanne	Cooper T51-Climax	94 laps	16
11	(United Kingdom) Trevor Taylor	Team Lotus	Lotus 24-Climax	72 laps	9
Ret	(Sweden) Jo Bonnier	Scuderia SSS Republica di Venezia	Porsche 718/2	70 laps, crownwheel & pinion	3
Ret	(Belgium) Lucien Bianchi	Equipe Nationale Belge	ENB-Maserati	62 laps, rear suspension	10
Ret	(United Kingdom) Jim Clark	Team Lotus	Lotus 24-Climax	24 laps, gear linkage	1
Ret	(Canada) Ludwig Heimrath	Porsche System Engineering	Porsche 718/2	24 laps, accident	12
Ret	(Australia) Jack Brabham	Brabham Racing Organisation	Lotus 21-Climax	5 laps, oil pressure	4
DNQ	(France) Maurice Caillet	Ets Cegga	Cegga-Maserati		-
DNQ	(Germany) Kurt Kuhnke	Autosport Team Wolfgang Seidel	Lotus 18-Borgward		-
WD	(France) Bernard Collomb	Bernard Collomb	Cooper T53-Climax	Car destroyed at previous race	-
WD	(Switzerland) Michael May	Michael May	-		-

Previous race: 1962 Glover Trophy	Formula One non-championship races 1962 season	Next race: 1962 Aintree 200
Previous race: 1961 Pau Grand Prix	Pau Grand Prix	Next race: 1963 Pau Grand Prix
