= 1963 BRDC International Trophy =

- Non-championship race in the 1963 Formula One season
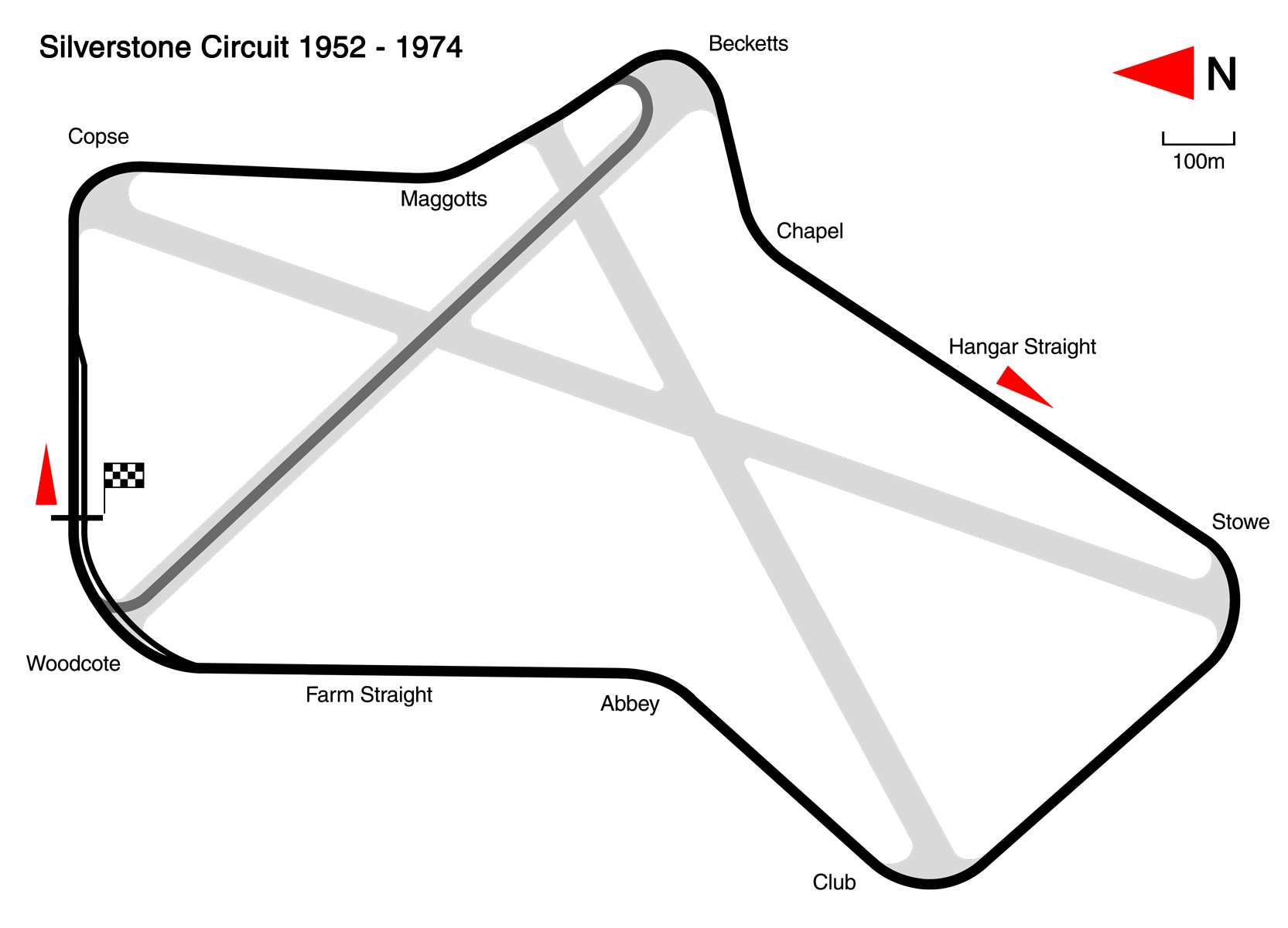

Race details
- Date: 11 May 1963
- Official name: XV BRDC International Trophy
- Location: Silverstone Circuit, Northamptonshire
- Course: Permanent racing facility
- Course length: 4.711 km (2.927 miles)
- Distance: 52 laps, 244.972 km (152.204 miles)

Pole position
Driver	(United Kingdom) Innes Ireland	Lotus-BRM
- Time: 1:34.4

Fastest lap
Driver	(United Kingdom) Innes Ireland	Lotus-BRM
- Time: 1:35.4

Podium
First	(United Kingdom) Jim Clark	Lotus-Climax
Second	(New Zealand) Bruce McLaren	Cooper-Climax
Third	(United Kingdom) Trevor Taylor	Lotus-Climax

The 15th BRDC International Trophy was a motor race, run to Formula One rules, held on 11 May 1963 at the Silverstone Circuit, England. The race was run over 52 laps of the Silverstone Grand Prix circuit, and was won by British driver Jim Clark in a Lotus 25.

== Results ==
Pos	Driver	Entrant	Constructor	Time/Retired	Grid
1	(United Kingdom) Jim Clark	Team Lotus	Lotus-Climax	1.24:27.6	6
2	(New Zealand) Bruce McLaren	Cooper Car Company	Cooper-Climax	+ 24.6 s	3
3	(United Kingdom) Trevor Taylor	Team Lotus	Lotus-Climax	+ 34.0 s	5
4	(United Kingdom) Innes Ireland	British Racing Partnership	Lotus-BRM	+ 40.0 s	1
5	(Sweden) Jo Bonnier	Rob Walker Racing Team	Cooper-Climax	51 laps	14
6	(South Africa) Tony Maggs	Cooper Car Company	Cooper-Climax	51 laps	11
7	(Australia) Jack Brabham	Brabham Racing Organisation	Brabham-Climax	51 laps	4
8	(United Kingdom) Ian Raby	Ian Raby (Racing)	Gilby-BRM	48 laps	21
9	(Netherlands) Carel Godin de Beaufort	Ecurie Maarsbergen	Porsche	46 laps	17
DSQ	(Italy) Lorenzo Bandini	Scuderia Centro Sud	BRM	Push-start	10
Ret	(United States) Jim Hall	British Racing Partnership	Lotus-BRM	Ignition	12
Ret	(United Kingdom) Tim Parnell	Tim Parnell	Lotus-Climax	Piston	16
Ret	(United Kingdom) Philip Robinson	A. Robinson & Sons	Lotus-Climax	Crownwheel & pinion	19
Ret	(United Kingdom) John Surtees	SEFAC Ferrari	Ferrari	Oil leak	7
Ret	(United Kingdom) Graham Hill	Owen Racing Organisation	BRM	Battery	2
Ret	(United Kingdom) John Taylor	Anglo-Scottish Racing Team	Cooper-Ford	Oil leak	18
Ret	(United Kingdom) John Campbell-Jones	Tim Parnell	Lotus-BRM	Ignition	15
Ret	(Belgium) Willy Mairesse	SEFAC Ferrari	Ferrari	Accident	9
Ret	(New Zealand) Chris Amon	Reg Parnell (Racing)	Lola-Climax	Oil seal	13
Ret	(United States) Richie Ginther	Owen Racing Organisation	BRM	Gearbox	8
DNS	(Belgium) André Pilette	André Pilette	Lotus-Climax	Withdrawn	(20)
WD	(United Kingdom) Peter Arundell	Team Lotus	Lotus-Climax	No car	-
WD	(United States) Dan Gurney	Brabham Racing Organisation	Brabham-Climax	Car not ready	-
WD	(United States) Tony Settember	Scirocco-Powell (Racing Cars)	Scirocco-BRM	Car not ready	-
WD	(Mexico) Pedro Rodríguez	Scirocco-Powell (Racing Cars)	Scirocco-BRM	Car not ready	-
WD	(United States) Phil Hill	Automobili Turismo e Sport	ATS	Car not ready	-

Previous race: 1963 Aintree 200	Formula One non-championship races 1963 season	Next race: 1963 Rome Grand Prix
Previous race: 1962 BRDC International Trophy	BRDC International Trophy	Next race: 1964 BRDC International Trophy
