= 1963 Imola Grand Prix =

- Non-championship race in the 1963 Formula One season
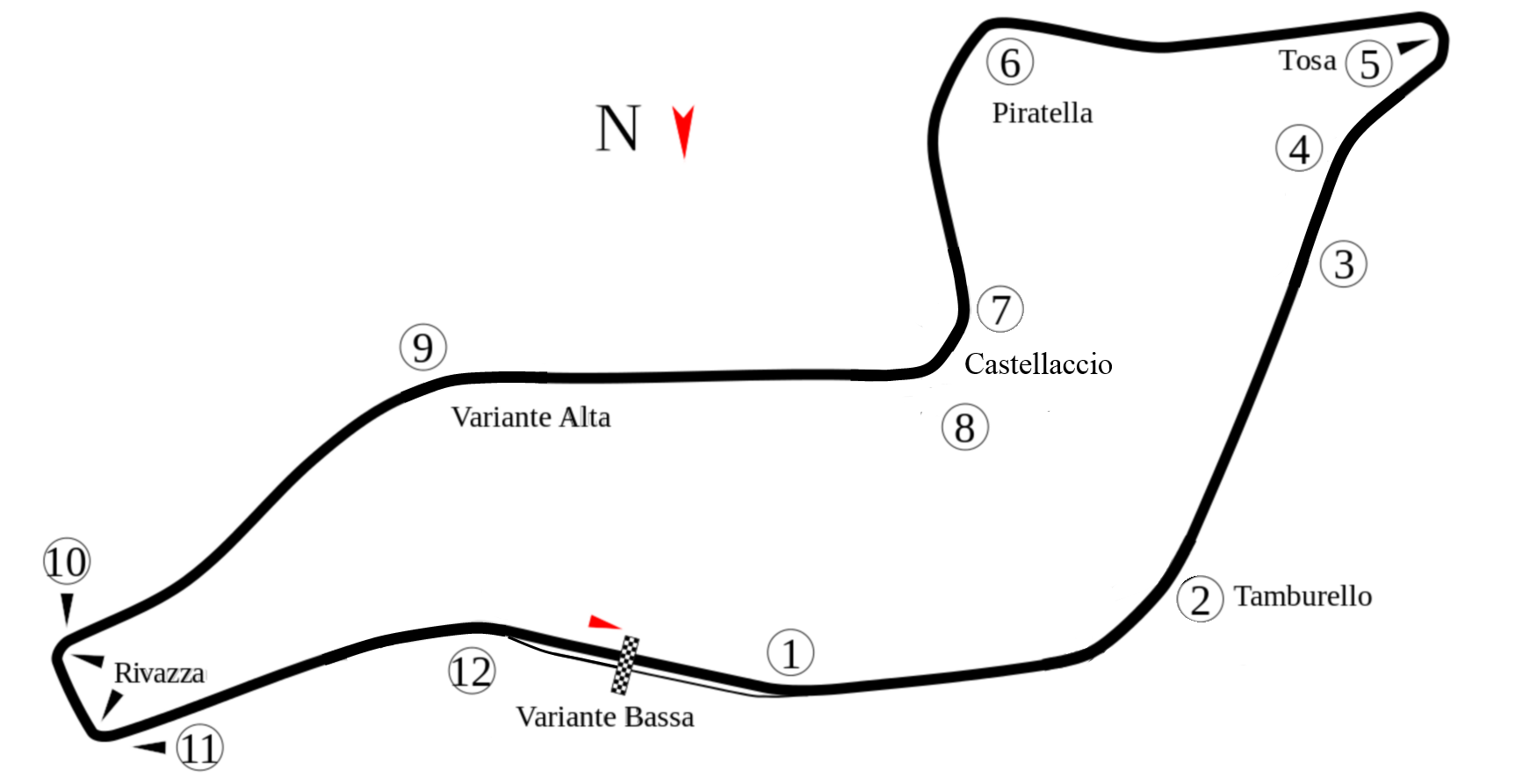

Race details
- Date: 21 April 1963
- Official name: IV Gran Premio d'Imola
- Location: Autodromo di Castellaccis, Imola, Emilia-Romagna, Italy
- Course: Permanent racing facility
- Course length: 5.018 km (3.118 miles)
- Distance: 50 laps, 250.85 km (155.90 miles)

Pole position
Driver	(United Kingdom) Jim Clark	Lotus-Climax
- Time: 1:48.3

Fastest lap
Driver	(United Kingdom) Trevor Taylor	Lotus-Climax
- Time: 1:48.3

Podium
First	(United Kingdom) Jim Clark	Lotus-Climax
Second	(Switzerland) Jo Siffert	Lotus-BRM
Third	(United Kingdom) Bob Anderson	Lola-Climax

The 4th Imola Grand Prix was a motor race, run to Formula One rules, held on 21 April 1963 at the Autodromo di Castellaccis. The previous three Imola Grands Prix were sports car races held in the mid-1950s, and this was the first Formula One event held at the circuit. From 1981, the circuit was the venue for the San Marino Grand Prix.

The race was run over 50 laps of the circuit, and was won by British driver Jim Clark in a Lotus 25, lapping the entire field except for second-placed Jo Siffert. Trevor Taylor set the fastest lap after losing more than ten laps with a gear selector problem.

== Results ==
Pos	No.	Driver	Entrant	Constructor	Time/Retired	Grid
1	4	(United Kingdom) Jim Clark	Team Lotus	Lotus-Climax	1:34:07.4	1
2	10	(Switzerland) Jo Siffert	Ecurie Filipinetti	Lotus-BRM	+1:25.6	4
3	18	(United Kingdom) Bob Anderson	DW Racing Enterprises	Lola-Climax	+1 lap	6
4	34	(France) Jo Schlesser	Inter-Autocourse	Brabham-Ford	+1 lap	7
5	32	(Italy) Carlo Abate	Scuderia Centro Sud	Cooper-Maserati	+1 lap	12
6	12	(Netherlands) Carel Godin de Beaufort	Ecurie Maarsbergen	Porsche	+2 laps	8
7	14	(United Kingdom) Jack Fairman	Ecurie Maarsbergen	Porsche	+3 laps	9
8	38	(Italy) Ernesto Prinoth	Ernesto Prinoth	Lotus-Climax	+9 laps	10
9	6	(United Kingdom) Trevor Taylor	Team Lotus	Lotus-Climax	+14 laps	2
Ret	8	(Sweden) Jo Bonnier	Rob Walker Racing Team	Lotus-Climax	Piston	3
Ret	36	(France) Bernard Collomb	Bernard Collomb	Lotus-Climax	Ignition	11
Ret	30	(Italy) Lorenzo Bandini	Scuderia Centro Sud	Cooper-Maserati	Oil pressure	5
Ret	28	(Italy) Gaetano Starrabba	Gaetano Starrabba	Lotus-Maserati	Throttle linkage	13
DNQ	22	(Germany) Günther Seiffert	Autosport Team Wolfgang Seidel	Lotus-BRM		–
DNQ	20	(Italy) Giancarlo Baghetti	Ecurie Filipinetti	Lotus-Climax		–
WD	2	(United Kingdom) John Surtees	SEFAC Ferrari	Ferrari	Car not ready	–
WD	16	(United States) Phil Hill	Automobili Turismo e Sport	ATS	Car not ready	–
WD	24	(Belgium) André Pilette	André Pilette	Lotus-Climax		–
WD	26	(Italy) Carlo Abate	Scuderia Centro Sud	Porsche	No car – driver drove No. 32	–
WD	32	(Belgium) Willy Mairesse	SEFAC Ferrari	Ferrari	Car not ready – entry taken by Scd. Centro Sud	–

Previous race: 1963 Pau Grand Prix	Formula One non-championship races 1963 season	Next race: 1963 Syracuse Grand Prix
Previous race: 1956 Imola Grand Prix	Imola Grand Prix	Next race: —
