= 1963 Italian Grand Prix =

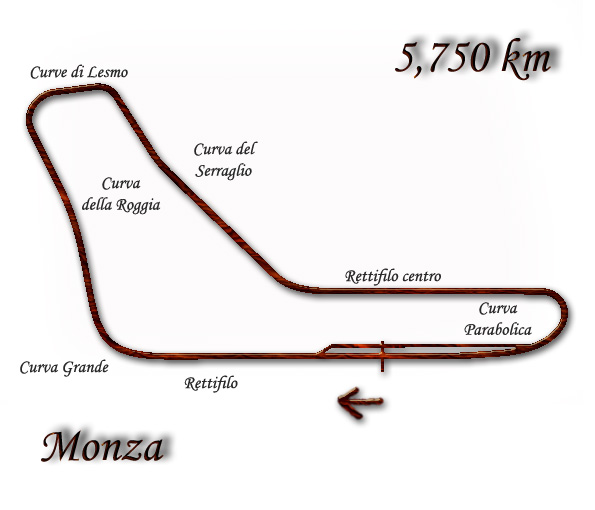

Race details
- Date: 8 September 1963
- Official name: XXXIV Gran Premio d'Italia
- Location: Autodromo Nazionale di Monza; Monza, Italy
- Course: Permanent racing facility
- Course length: 5.750 km (3.573 miles)
- Distance: 86 laps, 494.500 km (307.268 miles)
- Weather: Warm, dry and sunny

Pole position
Driver	(United Kingdom) John Surtees	Ferrari
- Time: 1:37.3

Fastest lap
Driver	(United Kingdom) Jim Clark	Lotus-Climax
- Time: 1:38.9 on lap 60

Podium
First	(United Kingdom) Jim Clark	Lotus-Climax
Second	(United States) Richie Ginther	BRM
Third	(New Zealand) Bruce McLaren	Cooper-Climax

The 1963 Italian Grand Prix was a Formula One motor race held at Monza on 8 September 1963. It was the seventh of ten races in both the 1963 World Championship of Drivers and the 1963 International Cup for Formula One Manufacturers. At this race, Scottish driver Jim Clark clinched the World Championship crown with three races to go, the first time anyone had done so.

The organisers had planned to run on the full 10 km circuit but the very bumpy (and in some places ruined) nature of the banked concrete curves provoked much criticism and also caused accidents. Therefore, at the drivers' request, for the next day it was decided to revert to the 5.75 km road layout.

This race was Scuderia Ferrari's 100th start in a World Championship event as a team. Jim Clark became the first driver to win the World Drivers' Championship with 3 races left to go. Lotus-Climax also won the Constructors' Championship.

== Classification ==
=== Qualifying ===
Pos	No	Driver	Constructor	Qualifying times		Gap
Pos	No	Driver	Constructor	Q1	Q2	Gap
1	4	(United Kingdom) John Surtees	Ferrari	1:39.58	1:37.3	—
2	12	(United Kingdom) Graham Hill	BRM	1:39.75	1:38.5	+1.2
3	8	(United Kingdom) Jim Clark	Lotus-Climax	1:39.68	1:39.0	+1.7
4	10	(United States) Richie Ginther	BRM	1:41.2	1:39.2	+1.9
5	24	(United States) Dan Gurney	Brabham-Climax	1:44.2	1:39.2	+1.9
6	2	(Italy) Lorenzo Bandini	Ferrari	1:40.1	1:40.1	+2.8
7	22	(Australia) Jack Brabham	Brabham-Climax	3:25.4	1:40.4	+3.1
8	18	(New Zealand) Bruce McLaren	Cooper-Climax	No time	1:40.5	+3.2
9	6	(United Kingdom) Mike Spence	Lotus-Climax	No time	1:40.9	+3.6
10	32	(United Kingdom) Innes Ireland	BRP-BRM	No time	1:41.6	+4.3
11	58	(Sweden) Jo Bonnier	Cooper-Climax	No time	1:41.9	+4.6
12	42	(United States) Masten Gregory	Lotus-BRM	No time	1:42.1	+4.8
13	20	(South Africa) Tony Maggs	Cooper-Climax	No time	1:42.2	+4.9
14	16	(United States) Phil Hill	ATS	1:48.5	1:42.7	+5.4
15^{1}	38	(New Zealand) Chris Amon	Lola-Climax	No time	1:42.9	+5.6
16	54	(Switzerland) Jo Siffert	Lotus-BRM	2:35.9	1:43.3	+6.0
17	30	(United States) Jim Hall	Lotus-BRM	No time	1:43.8	+6.5
18	40	(United Kingdom) Mike Hailwood	Lola-Climax	1:46.2	1:43.9	+6.6
19	48	(United Kingdom) Bob Anderson	Lola-Climax	No time	1:44.2	+6.9
20	66	(France) Maurice Trintignant	BRM	No time	1:44.4	+7.1
21	64	(Portugal) Mário de Araújo Cabral	Cooper-Climax	1:55.0	1:44.8	+7.5
22	50	(United Kingdom) Ian Raby	Gilby-BRM	No time	1:45.1	+7.8
23	34	(United States) Tony Settember	Scirocco-BRM	No time	1:45.9	+8.6
24	28	(Netherlands) Carel Godin de Beaufort	Porsche	No time	1:46.4	+9.1
25^{1}	14	(Italy) Giancarlo Baghetti	ATS	1:54.9	1:46.8	+9.5
26	62	(Italy) Ernesto Brambilla	Cooper-Maserati	2:00.1	1:50.3	+13.0
27	46	(Belgium) André Pilette	Lotus-Climax	1:58.7	1:53.7	+16.4
28	44	(Italy) Roberto Lippi	de Tomaso-Ferrari	2:03.9	2:03.9	+26.6

Notes

- ^1 – Only 20 cars were permitted to take the start. Chris Amon's practice accident left him hospitalised, leaving him unable to take the start. This would have promoted Mário de Araújo Cabral, who was 21st in qualifying, onto the starting grid. However, on race day, Giancarlo Baghetti, who was 25th quickest in qualifying, lined up on the starting grid. A race report from the time speculated that this was as a result of the race organisers arranging for Baghetti to start so there could be an additional Italian driver in the race.

=== Race ===
Pos	No	Driver	Constructor	Laps	Time/Retired	Grid	Points
1	8	(United Kingdom) Jim Clark	Lotus-Climax	86	2:24:19.6	3	9
2	10	(United States) Richie Ginther	BRM	86	+ 1:35.0	4	6
3	18	(New Zealand) Bruce McLaren	Cooper-Climax	85	+ 1 lap	8	4
4	32	(United Kingdom) Innes Ireland	BRP-BRM	84	Engine	10	3
5	22	(Australia) Jack Brabham	Brabham-Climax	84	+ 2 laps	7	2
6	20	(South Africa) Tony Maggs	Cooper-Climax	84	+ 2 laps	13	1
7	58	(Sweden) Jo Bonnier	Cooper-Climax	84	+ 2 laps	11	
8	30	(United States) Jim Hall	Lotus-BRM	84	+ 2 laps	16	
9	66	(France) Maurice Trintignant	BRM	83	+ 3 laps	19	
10	40	(United Kingdom) Mike Hailwood	Lola-Climax	82	+ 4 laps	17	
11	16	(United States) Phil Hill	ATS	79	+ 7 laps	14	
12	48	(United Kingdom) Bob Anderson	Lola-Climax	79	+ 7 laps	18	
13	6	(United Kingdom) Mike Spence	Lotus-Climax	73	Oil Pressure	9	
14	24	(United States) Dan Gurney	Brabham-Climax	64	Fuel System	5	
15	14	(Italy) Giancarlo Baghetti	ATS	63	+ 23 laps	20	
16	12	(United Kingdom) Graham Hill	BRM	59	Clutch	2	
Ret	54	(Switzerland) Jo Siffert	Lotus-BRM	40	Oil Pressure	15	
Ret	2	(Italy) Lorenzo Bandini	Ferrari	37	Gearbox	6	
Ret	42	(United States) Masten Gregory	Lotus-BRM	26	Engine	12	
Ret	4	(United Kingdom) John Surtees	Ferrari	16	Engine	1	
DNS	38	(New Zealand) Chris Amon	Lola-Climax		Practice Accident		
DNQ	64	(Portugal) Mário de Araújo Cabral	Cooper-Climax				
DNQ	50	(United Kingdom) Ian Raby	Gilby-BRM				
DNQ	34	(United States) Tony Settember	Scirocco-BRM				
DNQ	28	(Netherlands) Carel Godin de Beaufort	Porsche				
DNQ	62	(Italy) Ernesto Brambilla	Cooper-Maserati				
DNQ	46	(Belgium) André Pilette	Lotus-Climax				
DNQ	44	(Italy) Roberto Lippi	de Tomaso-Ferrari				
WD	26	(Germany) Gerhard Mitter	Porsche				
WD	36	(United Kingdom) Ian Burgess	Scirocco-BRM				
WD	52	(Germany) Günther Seiffert	Lotus-BRM				
WD	56	(Italy) Carlo Abate	Porsche				
WD	60	(Italy) Gaetano Starrabba	Lotus-Maserati				

== Notes ==
- This was the Formula One World Championship debut for British driver Mike Spence and Italian driver Ernesto Brambilla.

== Championship standings after the race ==
- **Bold text** indicates the World Champion.

Drivers' Championship standings

	Pos	Driver	Points
	1	(United Kingdom) **Jim Clark**	51
1	2	(United States) Richie Ginther	24
1	3	(United Kingdom) John Surtees	22
2	4	(New Zealand) Bruce McLaren	14
1	5	(United Kingdom) Graham Hill	13

Constructors' Championship standings

	Pos	Constructor	Points
	1	(United Kingdom) Lotus-Climax	51 (52)
1	2	(United Kingdom) BRM	28
1	3	(Italy) Ferrari	22
	4	(United Kingdom) Cooper-Climax	21
	5	(United Kingdom) Brabham-Climax	15

- Notes: Only the top five positions are included for both sets of standings. Only the best 6 results counted towards the Championship. Numbers without parentheses are Championship points; numbers in parentheses are total points scored.

Previous race: 1963 German Grand Prix	FIA Formula One World Championship; 1963 season	Next race: 1963 United States Grand Prix
Previous race: 1962 Italian Grand Prix	Italian Grand Prix	Next race: 1964 Italian Grand Prix
