= André Pilette =

Belgian racing driver (1918–1993)

- Born: 6 October 1918; Paris, France
- Died: 27 December 1993 (aged 75); Etterbeek, Brussels, Belgium

Formula One World Championship career
- Nationality: (Belgium) Belgian
- Active years: 1951, 1953–1954, 1956, 1961, 1963–1964
- Team(s): Gordini, Ferrari, non-works Lotus, etc.
- Entries: 14 (9 starts)
- Championships: 0
- Wins: 0
- Podiums: 0
- Career points: 2
- Pole positions: 0
- Fastest laps: 0
- First entry: 1951 Belgian Grand Prix
- Last entry: 1964 German Grand Prix

André Théodore Pilette (6 October 1918 – 27 December 1993), son of former Indy 500 participant Théodore Pilette, was a racing driver from Belgium. He participated in 14 Formula One World Championship Grands Prix, debuting on 17 June 1951.

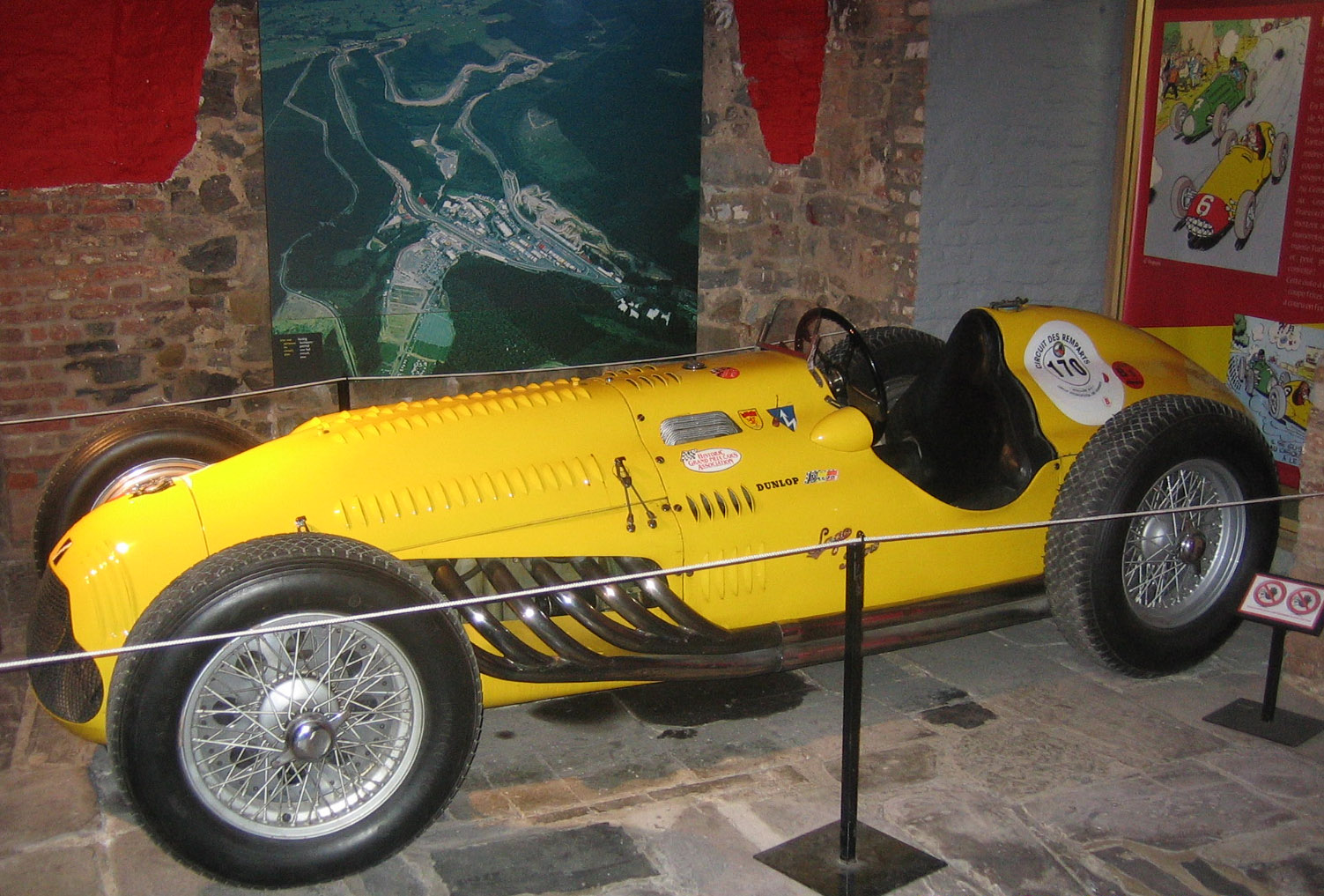
Talbot-Lago T26C with which Palette made his Formula 1 debut.

Pilette scored two championship points. His son Teddy Pilette also became a racing driver, although his F1 career in the mid-1970s was much briefer.

== Complete Formula One World Championship results ==
(key)

Year	Entrant	Chassis	Engine	1	2	3	4	5	6	7	8	9	10	WDC	Points
1951	Ecurie Belgique	Talbot-Lago T26C	Talbot Straight-6	SUI	500	BEL; 6	FRA	GBR	GER	ITA	ESP			NC	0
1953	Ecurie Belge	Connaught A Type	Lea-Francis Straight-4	ARG	500	NED	BEL; NC	FRA	GBR	GER	SUI	ITA		NC	0
1954	Equipe Gordini	Gordini Type 16	Gordini Straight-6	ARG	500	BEL; 5	FRA	GBR; 9	GER; Ret	SUI	ITA	ESP		19th	2
1956	Equipe Gordini	Gordini Type 32	Gordini Straight-8	ARG	MON; 6 *	500				GER; DNS	ITA			NC	0
1956	Scuderia Ferrari	Lancia D50	Ferrari V8				BEL; 6							NC	0
1956	Equipe Gordini	Gordini Type 16	Gordini Straight-6					FRA; 11						NC	0
1961	Equipe Nationale Belge	Emeryson P	Climax Straight-4	MON	NED	BEL	FRA	GBR	GER	ITA; DNQ	USA			NC	0
1963	Tim Parnell	Lotus 18/21	Climax Straight-4	MON	BEL	NED	FRA	GBR	GER; DNQ					NC	0
1963	André Pilette	Lotus 18/21	Climax Straight-4							ITA; DNQ	USA	MEX	RSA	NC	0
1964	Equipe Scirocco Belge	Scirocco 02	Climax V8	MON; WD	NED	BEL; Ret	FRA	GBR	GER; DNQ	AUT	ITA; WD	USA	MEX	NC	0

* Indicates shared drive with Élie Bayol
