= 1963 Belgian Grand Prix =

Second round of the 1963 Formula One World Championship

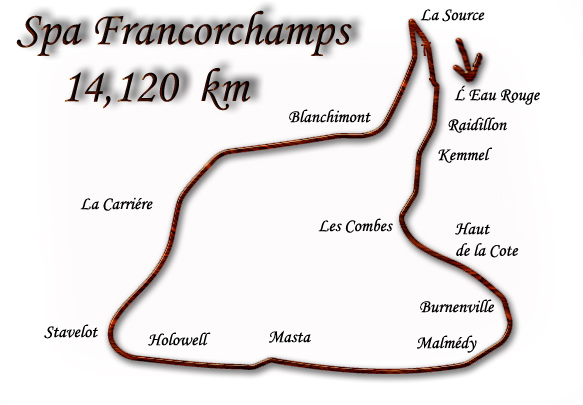

Race details
- Date: 9 June 1963
- Official name: XXIII Grand Prix de Belgique
- Location: Circuit de Spa-Francorchamps; Spa, Belgium
- Course: Permanent racing facility
- Course length: 14.100 km (8.761 miles)
- Distance: 32 laps, 451.200 km (280.363 miles)
- Weather: Wet and overcast

Pole position
Driver	(United Kingdom) Graham Hill	BRM
- Time: 3:54.1

Fastest lap
Driver	(United Kingdom) Jim Clark	Lotus-Climax
- Time: 3:58.1 on lap 16

Podium
First	(United Kingdom) Jim Clark	Lotus-Climax
Second	(New Zealand) Bruce McLaren	Cooper-Climax
Third	(United States) Dan Gurney	Brabham-Climax

The 1963 Belgian Grand Prix was a Formula One motor race, held at Spa-Francorchamps on 9 June 1963. It was race 2 of 10 in both the 1963 World Championship of Drivers and the 1963 International Cup for Formula One Manufacturers. Jim Clark won the race in extremely wet and rainy conditions. After starting eighth on the grid, Clark passed all the cars in front of him, including early leader Graham Hill. At the end of the race, Clark had not only lapped the entire field except for Bruce McLaren, but the margin to the second-placed Cooper driver was almost five minutes. The Scot's performance was made even more impressive by the fact that gearbox issues meant that he had to hold his gear lever in place, thus driving one-handed, whenever fifth gear was selected on this high-speed circuit. Given the rainy conditions, Clark eventually chose not to engage fifth gear at all, leaving him with only four gears. This would be the first of seven victories for Clark and Team Lotus that year.

== Classification ==
=== Qualifying ===
Pos	No	Driver	Constructor	Qualifying times		Gap
Pos	No	Driver	Constructor	Q1	Q2	Gap
1	7	(United Kingdom) Graham Hill	BRM	4:01.6	3:54.1	—
2	18	(United States) Dan Gurney	Brabham-Climax	4:28.8	3:55.0	+0.9
3	10	(Belgium) Willy Mairesse	Ferrari	3:56.2	3:55.3	+1.2
4	15	(South Africa) Tony Maggs	Cooper-Climax	3:57.1	3:56.0	+1.9
5	14	(New Zealand) Bruce McLaren	Cooper-Climax	3:58.3	3:56.2	+2.1
6	17	(Australia) Jack Brabham	Brabham-Climax	3:56.6	4:00.7	+2.5
7	4	(United Kingdom) Innes Ireland	BRP-BRM	4:05.3	3:56.9	+2.8
8	1	(United Kingdom) Jim Clark	Lotus-Climax	4:06.7	3:57.1	+3.0
9	8	(United States) Richie Ginther	BRM	4:04.5	3:57.6	+3.5
10	9	(United Kingdom) John Surtees	Ferrari	3:57.9	3:57.9	+3.8
11	2	(United Kingdom) Trevor Taylor	Lotus-Climax	4:02.7	3:58.1	+4.0
12	5	(United States) Jim Hall	Lotus-BRM	4:05.4	4:00.1	+6.0
13	12	(Sweden) Jo Bonnier	Cooper-Climax	4:01.4	4:00.1	+6.0
14	28	(Switzerland) Jo Siffert	Lotus-BRM	4:03.9	4:02.3	+8.2
15	21	(New Zealand) Chris Amon	Lola-Climax	4:17.2	4:04.9	+10.8
16	22	(Belgium) Lucien Bianchi	Lola-Climax	4:08.5	4:06.5	+12.4
17	26	(United States) Phil Hill	ATS	4:26.1	4:06.7	+12.6
18	29	(Netherlands) Carel Godin de Beaufort	Porsche	4:14.6	6:55.2	+20.5
19	24	(United States) Tony Settember	Scirocco-BRM	4:31.7	4:25.2	+31.1
20	27	(Italy) Giancarlo Baghetti	ATS	8:34.8	4:33.6	+39.5

=== Race ===
Pos	No	Driver	Constructor	Laps	Time/Retired	Grid	Points
1	1	(United Kingdom) Jim Clark	Lotus-Climax	32	2:27:47.6	8	9
2	14	(New Zealand) Bruce McLaren	Cooper-Climax	32	+ 4:54.0	5	6
3	18	(United States) Dan Gurney	Brabham-Climax	31	+ 1 lap	2	4
4	8	(United States) Richie Ginther	BRM	31	+ 1 lap	9	3
5	12	(Sweden) Jo Bonnier	Cooper-Climax	30	+ 2 laps	13	2
6	29	(Netherlands) Carel Godin de Beaufort	Porsche	30	+ 2 laps	18	1
7	15	(South Africa) Tony Maggs	Cooper-Climax	27	Accident	4	
8	24	(United States) Tony Settember	Scirocco-BRM	25	Accident	19	
Ret	9	(United Kingdom) John Surtees	Ferrari	19	Injection	10	
Ret	7	(United Kingdom) Graham Hill	BRM	17	Gearbox	1	
Ret	22	(Belgium) Lucien Bianchi	Lola-Climax	17	Accident	16	
Ret	5	(United States) Jim Hall	Lotus-BRM	16	Accident	12	
Ret	28	(Switzerland) Jo Siffert	Lotus-BRM	16	Accident	14	
Ret	26	(United States) Phil Hill	ATS	13	Gearbox	17	
Ret	17	(Australia) Jack Brabham	Brabham-Climax	12	Injection	6	
Ret	21	(New Zealand) Chris Amon	Lola-Climax	10	Oil Leak	15	
Ret	4	(United Kingdom) Innes Ireland	BRP-BRM	9	Gearbox	7	
Ret	10	(Belgium) Willy Mairesse	Ferrari	7	Injection	3	
Ret	27	(Italy) Giancarlo Baghetti	ATS	7	Gearbox	20	
Ret	2	(United Kingdom) Trevor Taylor	Lotus-Climax	5	Physical	11	
WD	3	(United Kingdom) Peter Arundell	Lotus-Climax		No car		
WD	11	(Italy) Ludovico Scarfiotti	Ferrari		No car		
WD	19	(Italy) Lorenzo Bandini	BRM		Car retained by BRM		
WD	25	(United Kingdom) Ian Burgess	Scirocco-BRM		Car not ready		

== Notes ==
- This was the Formula One World Championship debut for British constructors Scirocco and BRP and for Italian constructor ATS.
- It was also the first podium finish for the Brabham team.
- This marked the 50th race for a Coventry Climax-powered car.

== Championship standings after the race ==
Drivers' Championship standings

	Pos	Driver	Points
2	1	(New Zealand) Bruce McLaren	10
6	2	(United Kingdom) Jim Clark	9
2	3	(United Kingdom) Graham Hill	9
2	4	(United States) Richie Ginther	9
5	5	(United States) Dan Gurney	4

Constructors' Championship standings

	Pos	Constructor	Points
	1	(United Kingdom) BRM	12
2	2	(United Kingdom) Lotus-Climax	10
1	3	(United Kingdom) Cooper-Climax	10
1	4	(United Kingdom) Brabham-Climax	4
2	5	(Italy) Ferrari	3

- Notes: Only the top five positions are included for both sets of standings.

Previous race: 1963 Monaco Grand Prix	FIA Formula One World Championship; 1963 season	Next race: 1963 Dutch Grand Prix
Previous race: 1962 Belgian Grand Prix	Belgian Grand Prix	Next race: 1964 Belgian Grand Prix
