= 1963 British Grand Prix =

Formula One motor race held in 1963

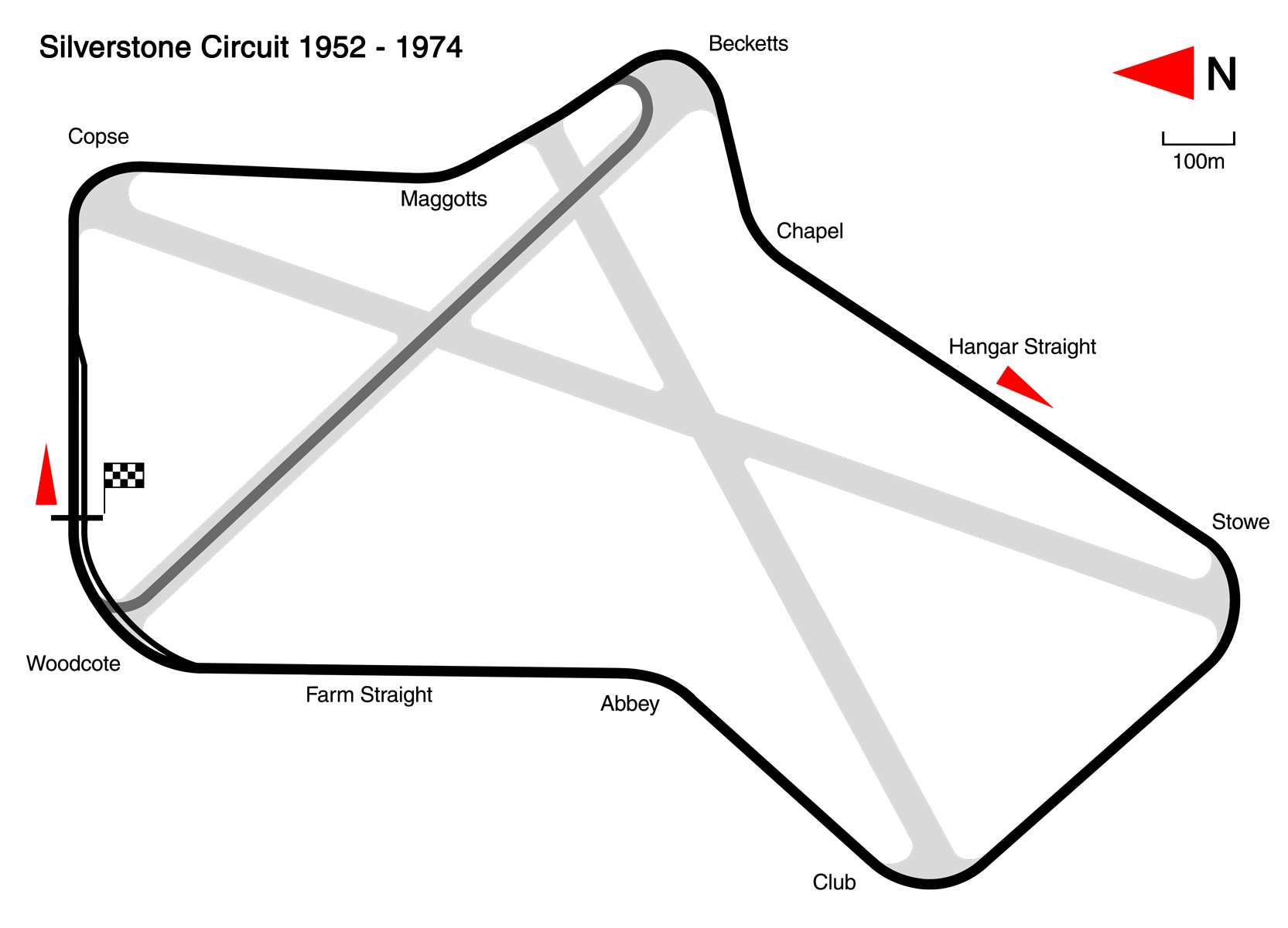

Race details
- Date: 20 July 1963
- Official name: XVI RAC British Grand Prix
- Location: Silverstone Circuit; England
- Course: Permanent racing facility
- Course length: 4.711 km (2.927 miles)
- Distance: 82 laps, 386.261 km (240.011 miles)
- Weather: Warm, dry and sunny

Pole position
Driver	(United Kingdom) Jim Clark	Lotus-Climax
- Time: 1:34.4

Fastest lap
Driver	(United Kingdom) John Surtees	Ferrari
- Time: 1:36.0 on lap 3

Podium
First	(United Kingdom) Jim Clark	Lotus-Climax
Second	(United Kingdom) John Surtees	Ferrari
Third	(United Kingdom) Graham Hill	BRM

The 1963 British Grand Prix was a Formula One motor race held at the Silverstone Circuit in Northamptonshire, England on 20 July 1963. It was race 5 of 10 in both the 1963 World Championship of Drivers and the 1963 International Cup for Formula One Manufacturers. It was also the eighteenth British Grand Prix, and the first to be held at Silverstone since 1960. The race was won by Scotsman Jim Clark for the second year in succession driving a Lotus 25.

== Classification ==
=== Qualifying ===
Pos	No	Driver	Constructor	Qualifying times			Gap
Pos	No	Driver	Constructor	Q1	Q2	Q3	Gap
1	4	(United Kingdom) Jim Clark	Lotus-Climax	1:39.6	1:34.4	1:34.6	—
2	9	(United States) Dan Gurney	Brabham-Climax	1:42.0	1:35.8	1:34.6	+0.2
3	1	(United Kingdom) Graham Hill	BRM	1:36.0	1:35.4	1:34.8	+0.4
4	8	(Australia) Jack Brabham	Brabham-Climax	1:36.0	1:39.0	1:35.0	+0.6
5	10	(United Kingdom) John Surtees	Ferrari	1:37.4	1:35.8	1:35.2	+0.8
6	6	(New Zealand) Bruce McLaren	Cooper-Climax	1:38.8	1:35.6	1:35.4	+1.0
7	7	(South Africa) Tony Maggs	Cooper-Climax	1:41.2	1:38.0	1:36.0	+1.6
8	3	(Italy) Lorenzo Bandini	BRM	No time	1:38.0	1:36.0	+1.6
9	2	(United States) Richie Ginther	BRM	1:39.6	1:36.8	1:36.0	+1.6
10	5	(United Kingdom) Trevor Taylor	Lotus-Climax	1:39.8	1:36.8	1:37.0	+2.4
11	11	(United Kingdom) Innes Ireland	BRP-BRM	1:45.4	1:38.0	1:36.8	+2.4
12	14	(Sweden) Jo Bonnier	Cooper-Climax	1:38.0	1:37.6	1:36.8	+2.4
13	12	(United States) Jim Hall	Lotus-BRM	1:38.0	1:37.0	No time	+2.6
14	19	(New Zealand) Chris Amon	Lola-Climax	1:44.6	1:38.4	1:37.2	+2.8
15	25	(Switzerland) Jo Siffert	Lotus-BRM	1:45.2	1:39.4	1:38.4	+4.0
16	22	(United Kingdom) Bob Anderson	Lola-Climax	1:43.2	1:39.0	1:39.4	+4.6
17	20	(United Kingdom) Mike Hailwood	Lotus-Climax	1:42.0	1:41.0	1:39.8	+5.4
18	15	(United States) Tony Settember	Scirocco-BRM	No time	1:45.0	1:40.8	+6.4
19	26	(United Kingdom) Ian Raby	Gilby-BRM	No time	No time	1:42.4	+8.0
20	16	(United Kingdom) Ian Burgess	Scirocco-BRM	No time	1:49.4	1:42.6	+8.2
21	23	(Netherlands) Carel Godin de Beaufort	Porsche	1:45.6	1:44.0	1:43.4	+9.0
22	21	(United States) Masten Gregory	Lotus-BRM	No time	1:44.2	1:47.4	+9.8
23	24	(United Kingdom) John Campbell-Jones	Lola-Climax	No time	No time	1:48.8	+14.4

=== Race ===
Pos	No	Driver	Constructor	Laps	Time/Retired	Grid	Points
1	4	(United Kingdom) Jim Clark	Lotus-Climax	82	2:14:09.6	1	9
2	10	(United Kingdom) John Surtees	Ferrari	82	+ 25.8	5	6
3	1	(United Kingdom) Graham Hill	BRM	82	+ 37.6	3	4
4	2	(United States) Richie Ginther	BRM	81	+ 1 lap	9	3
5	3	(Italy) Lorenzo Bandini	BRM	81	+ 1 lap	8	2
6	12	(United States) Jim Hall	Lotus-BRM	80	+ 2 laps	13	1
7	19	(New Zealand) Chris Amon	Lola-Climax	80	+ 2 laps	14	
8	20	(United Kingdom) Mike Hailwood	Lotus-Climax	78	+ 4 laps	17	
9	7	(South Africa) Tony Maggs	Cooper-Climax	78	+ 4 laps	7	
10	23	(Netherlands) Carel Godin de Beaufort	Porsche	76	+ 6 laps	21	
11	21	(United States) Masten Gregory	Lotus-BRM	75	+ 7 laps	22	
12	22	(United Kingdom) Bob Anderson	Lola-Climax	75	+ 7 laps	16	
13	24	(United Kingdom) John Campbell-Jones	Lola-Climax	74	+ 8 laps	23	
Ret	25	(Switzerland) Jo Siffert	Lotus-BRM	66	Gearbox	15	
Ret	14	(Sweden) Jo Bonnier	Cooper-Climax	65	Oil Pressure	12	
Ret	9	(United States) Dan Gurney	Brabham-Climax	59	Engine	2	
Ret	26	(United Kingdom) Ian Raby	Gilby-BRM	59	Gearbox	19	
Ret	16	(United Kingdom) Ian Burgess	Scirocco-BRM	36	Ignition	20	
Ret	8	(Australia) Jack Brabham	Brabham-Climax	27	Engine	4	
Ret	11	(United Kingdom) Innes Ireland	BRP-BRM	26	Ignition	11	
Ret	5	(United Kingdom) Trevor Taylor	Lotus-Climax	23	Fuel Pump	10	
Ret	15	(United States) Tony Settember	Scirocco-BRM	20	Ignition	18	
Ret	6	(New Zealand) Bruce McLaren	Cooper-Climax	6	Engine	6	
DNP	27	(Argentina) Nasif Estéfano	De Tomaso				
WD	17	(Italy) Giancarlo Baghetti	ATS		Car not ready		
WD	18	(United States) Phil Hill	ATS		Car not ready		

== Notes ==
- This was the Formula One World Championship debut for British drivers Mike Hailwood, Bob Anderson and Ian Raby.

== Championship standings after the race ==
Drivers' Championship standings

	Pos	Driver	Points
	1	(United Kingdom) Jim Clark	36
1	2	(United States) Richie Ginther	14
2	3	(United Kingdom) Graham Hill	13
3	4	(United Kingdom) John Surtees	13
3	5	(United States) Dan Gurney	12

Constructors' Championship standings

	Pos	Constructor	Points
	1	(United Kingdom) Lotus-Climax	37
1	2	(United Kingdom) BRM	18
1	3	(United Kingdom) Cooper-Climax	16
	4	(United Kingdom) Brabham-Climax	13
	5	(Italy) Ferrari	13

- Notes: Only the top five positions are included for both sets of standings.

Previous race: 1963 French Grand Prix	FIA Formula One World Championship; 1963 season	Next race: 1963 German Grand Prix
Previous race: 1962 British Grand Prix	British Grand Prix	Next race: 1964 British Grand Prix
