= 1963 Dutch Grand Prix =

- Zandvoort original layout

Race details
- Date: 23 June 1963
- Official name: XI Grote Prijs van Nederland
- Location: Circuit Park Zandvoort; Zandvoort, Netherlands
- Course: Permanent racing facility
- Course length: 4.193 km (2.605 miles)
- Distance: 80 laps, 335.440 km (208.433 miles)
- Weather: Sunny

Pole position
Driver	(United Kingdom) Jim Clark	Lotus-Climax
- Time: 1:31.6

Fastest lap
Driver	(United Kingdom) Jim Clark	Lotus-Climax
- Time: 1:33.7 on lap 56

Podium
First	(United Kingdom) Jim Clark	Lotus-Climax
Second	(United States) Dan Gurney	Brabham-Climax
Third	(United Kingdom) John Surtees	Ferrari

Dutch newsreel on the 1963 Dutch Grand Prix

The 1963 Dutch Grand Prix was a Formula One motor race held at Zandvoort on 23 June 1963. It was race 3 of 10 in both the 1963 World Championship of Drivers and the 1963 International Cup for Formula One Manufacturers. The 80-lap race was won by Lotus driver Jim Clark – by a margin of more than a full lap – after he started from pole position. Dan Gurney finished second for the Brabham team and Ferrari driver John Surtees came in third.

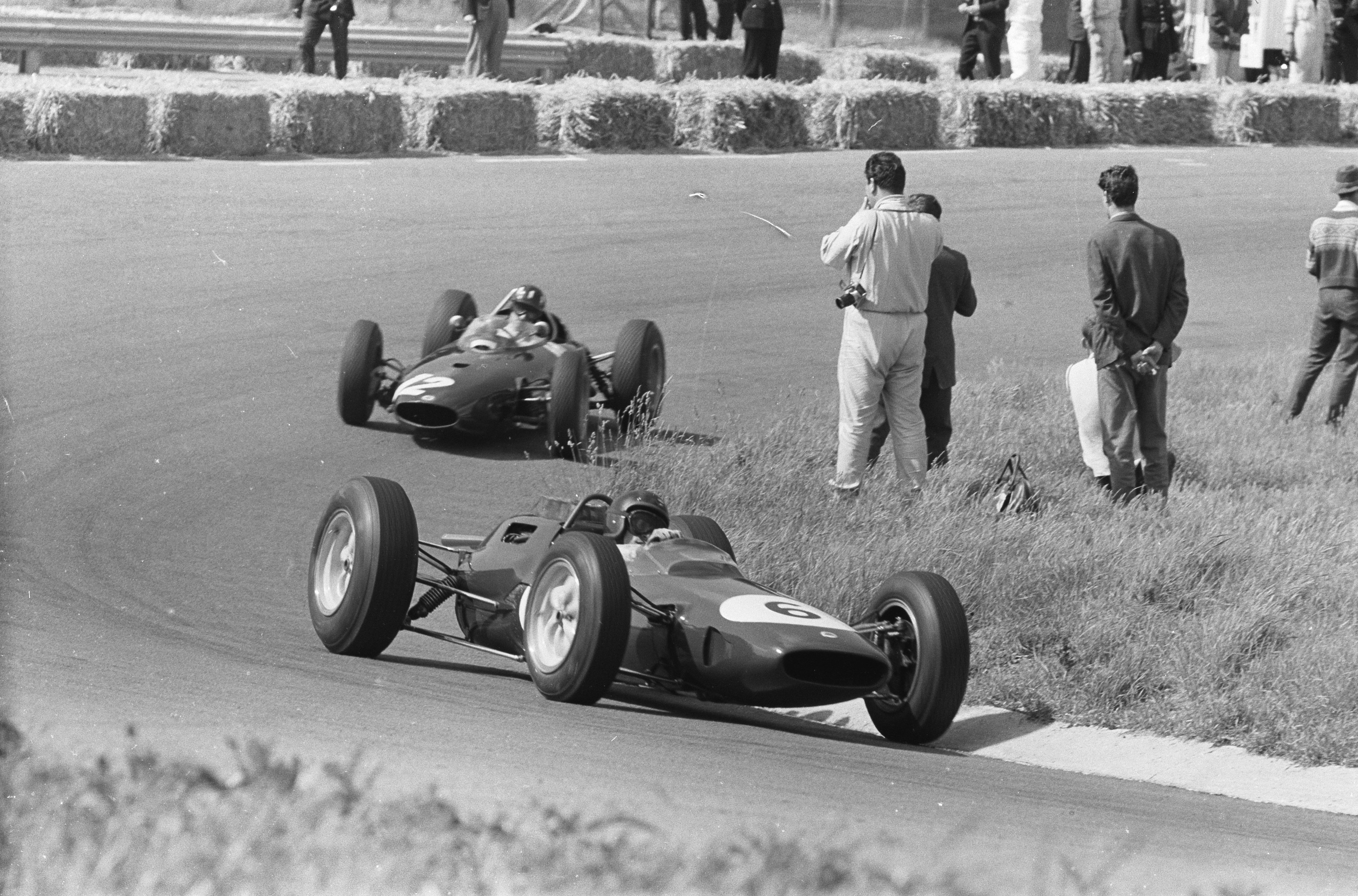
Jim Clark won the race driving a Lotus 25

== Classification ==
=== Qualifying ===
Pos	No	Driver	Constructor	Qualifying times			Gap
Pos	No	Driver	Constructor	Q1	Q2	Q3	Gap
1	6	(United Kingdom) Jim Clark	Lotus-Climax	No time	1:33.0	1:31.6	—
2	12	(United Kingdom) Graham Hill	BRM	1:33.3	1:32.2	1:32.5	+0.6
3	20	(New Zealand) Bruce McLaren	Cooper-Climax	1:34.1	1:33.3	1:32.3	+0.7
4	16	(Australia) Jack Brabham	Brabham-Climax	1:35.1	1:33.0	1:32.4	+0.8
5	2	(United Kingdom) John Surtees	Ferrari	1:33.7	1:33.6	1:33.0	+1.4
6	14	(United States) Richie Ginther	BRM	1:37.2	1:34.5	1:33.3	+1.7
7	30	(United Kingdom) Innes Ireland	BRP-BRM	1:33.6†	1:39.0	(1:33.4)	+1.7
8	28	(Sweden) Jo Bonnier	Cooper-Climax	1:35.3	1:34.7	1:34.1	+2.5
9	22	(South Africa) Tony Maggs	Cooper-Climax	1:35.8	1:35.0	1:34.3	+2.7
10	8	(United Kingdom) Trevor Taylor	Lotus-Climax	No time	1:40.4	1:35.2	+3.6
11	4	(Italy) Ludovico Scarfiotti	Ferrari	1:37.3	No time	1:35.6	+4.0
12	10	(New Zealand) Chris Amon	Lola-Climax	1:37.3	1:38.4	1:35.9	+4.3
13	24	(United States) Phil Hill	ATS	1:40.1	1:38.0	1:36.0	+4.4
14	18	(United States) Dan Gurney	Brabham-Climax	No time	1:36.2	No time	+4.6
15	26	(Italy) Giancarlo Baghetti	ATS	1:49.7	1:37.8	1:41.0	+6.2
16	34	(Germany) Gerhard Mitter	Porsche	No time	1:41.4	1:38.8	+7.2
17	36	(Switzerland) Jo Siffert	Lotus-BRM	No time	1:39.0	1:39.7	+7.4
18	42	(United States) Jim Hall	Lotus-BRM	No time	No time	1:39.0	+7.4
19	32	(Netherlands) Carel Godin de Beaufort	Porsche	No time	1:40.2	1:39.3	+7.7

Notes

- † – Ireland posted a faster time (1:33.3) in a Lotus-BRM car, but he surrendered the car during the final qualifying session to Jim Hall, whose entry had not been accepted initially by the organizers.

=== Race ===
Pos	No	Driver	Constructor	Laps	Time/Retired	Grid	Points
1	6	(United Kingdom) Jim Clark	Lotus-Climax	80	2:08:13.7	1	9
2	18	(United States) Dan Gurney	Brabham-Climax	79	+ 1 lap	14	6
3	2	(United Kingdom) John Surtees	Ferrari	79	+ 1 lap	5	4
4	30	(United Kingdom) Innes Ireland	BRP-BRM	79	+ 1 lap	7	3
5	14	(United States) Richie Ginther	BRM	79	+ 1 lap	6	2
6	4	(Italy) Ludovico Scarfiotti	Ferrari	78	+ 2 laps	11	1
7	36	(Switzerland) Jo Siffert	Lotus-BRM	77	+ 3 laps	17	
8	42	(United States) Jim Hall	Lotus-BRM	77	+ 3 laps	18	
9	32	(Netherlands) Carel Godin de Beaufort	Porsche	75	+ 5 laps	19	
10	8	(United Kingdom) Trevor Taylor	Lotus-Climax	66	+ 14 laps	10	
11	28	(Sweden) Jo Bonnier	Cooper-Climax	56	+ 24 laps	8	
Ret	12	(United Kingdom) Graham Hill	BRM	69	Overheating	2	
Ret	16	(Australia) Jack Brabham	Brabham-Climax	68	Accident	4	
Ret	10	(New Zealand) Chris Amon	Lola-Climax	29	Water pump	12	
Ret	26	(Italy) Giancarlo Baghetti	ATS	17	Ignition	15	
Ret	24	(United States) Phil Hill	ATS	15	Suspension	13	
Ret	22	(South Africa) Tony Maggs	Cooper-Climax	14	Overheating	9	
Ret	20	(New Zealand) Bruce McLaren	Cooper-Climax	7	Gearbox	3	
Ret	34	(Germany) Gerhard Mitter	Porsche	2	Clutch	16	
WD	38	(United States) Tony Settember	Scirocco-BRM				
WD	40	(United Kingdom) Ian Burgess	Scirocco-BRM				

== Notes ==
- This was the Formula One World Championship debut for Italian driver Ludovico Scarfiotti and German driver Gerhard Mitter.
- This was the 50th Formula One World Championship race start for a BRM.
- This was the 10th Formula One World Championship Grand Prix win for a Lotus.

== Championship standings after the race ==
Drivers' Championship standings

	Pos	Driver	Points
1	1	(United Kingdom) Jim Clark	18
2	2	(United States) Richie Ginther	11
2	3	(New Zealand) Bruce McLaren	10
1	4	(United States) Dan Gurney	10
2	5	(United Kingdom) Graham Hill	9

Constructors' Championship standings

	Pos	Constructor	Points
1	1	(United Kingdom) Lotus-Climax	19
1	2	(United Kingdom) BRM	14
	3	(United Kingdom) Cooper-Climax	10
	4	(United Kingdom) Brabham-Climax	10
	5	(Italy) Ferrari	7

- Notes: Only the top five positions are included for both sets of standings.

Previous race: 1963 Belgian Grand Prix	FIA Formula One World Championship; 1963 season	Next race: 1963 French Grand Prix
Previous race: 1962 Dutch Grand Prix	Dutch Grand Prix	Next race: 1964 Dutch Grand Prix
