= Ian Burgess =

British racing driver (1930–2012)

- Born: 6 July 1930; St Pancras, London, England
- Died: 19 May 2012 (aged 81); Harrow, Greater London, England

Formula One World Championship career
- Nationality: (United Kingdom) British
- Active years: 1958 – 1963
- Team(s): Cooper (inc. non-works), Scirocco; Non-works Lotus
- Entries: 20 (16 starts)
- Championships: 0
- Wins: 0
- Podiums: 0
- Career points: 0
- Pole positions: 0
- Fastest laps: 0
- First entry: 1958 British Grand Prix
- Last entry: 1963 German Grand Prix

Ian John Burgess (6 July 1930 – 19 May 2012) was a British racing driver. He participated in 20 Formula One World Championship Grands Prix, debuting on 19 July 1958, and numerous non-Championship Formula One races. He scored no championship points.

== Racing career ==
Burgess began racing in 1950 with a Cooper Formula Three car and had a successful 1951 season including a win at the Nürburgring before moving up to sports cars and Formula Two, where he was less successful.

Burgess began working for Cooper, both in their factory and at their drivers' school based at Brands Hatch and raced one of the works Formula Two cars in 1957, when he achieved fourth place in the Oulton Park Gold Cup. This led to a drive with Tommy Atkins' team in 1958, with a similar machine. He won at Crystal Palace and Snetterton and gained fourth places at Reims and Montlhéry. However, a broken leg at AVUS ended his season but not before he made his Formula One debut for Cooper at the British Grand Prix.

Burgess returned in 1959 driving Scuderia Centro Sud's Cooper T51-Maserati with a best finish of sixth in the German Grand Prix. He continued with the team in 1960 with little success.

For 1961, Burgess joined the American Camoradi International team, competing in five Grands Prix (three starts) with a best finish of 12th in the German Grand Prix. He moved to the Anglo American Equipe team in 1962 competing in three Grands Prix, finishing no higher than 11th. 1963 was his last year in racing and he competed in two Grands Prix for the Scirocco-Powell team, retiring from both.

Burgess died in Harrow, aged 81.

== Complete Formula One World Championship results ==
(key)

Year	Entrant	Chassis	Engine	1	2	3	4	5	6	7	8	9	10	11	WDC	Points
1958	Cooper Car Company	Cooper T45	Climax Straight-4	ARG	MON	NED	500	BEL	FRA	GBR; Ret					NC	0
1958	High Efficiency Motors	Cooper T43 (F2)	Climax Straight-4								GER; 7	POR	ITA	MOR	NC	0
1959	Scuderia Centro Sud	Cooper T51	Maserati Straight-4	MON	500	NED	FRA; Ret	GBR; Ret	GER; 6	POR	ITA; 14	USA			NC	0
1960	Scuderia Centro Sud	Cooper T51	Maserati Straight-4	ARG	MON; DNQ	500	NED	BEL	FRA; 10	GBR; Ret	POR	ITA	USA; Ret		NC	0
1961	Camoradi International	Lotus 18	Climax Straight-4	MON	NED; DNS	BEL; DNS	FRA; 14	GBR; 14							NC	0
1961	Camoradi International	Cooper T53	Climax Straight-4						GER; 12	ITA	USA				NC	0
1962	Anglo American Equipe	Cooper T59	Climax Straight-4	NED	MON	BEL	FRA	GBR; 12	GER; 11	ITA; DNQ	USA	RSA			NC	0
1963	Scirocco-Powell	Scirocco 02	BRM V8	MON; WD	BEL; WD	NED; WD	FRA; WD	GBR; Ret	GER; Ret	ITA; WD	USA	MEX	RSA		NC	0
