= Lotus 18 =

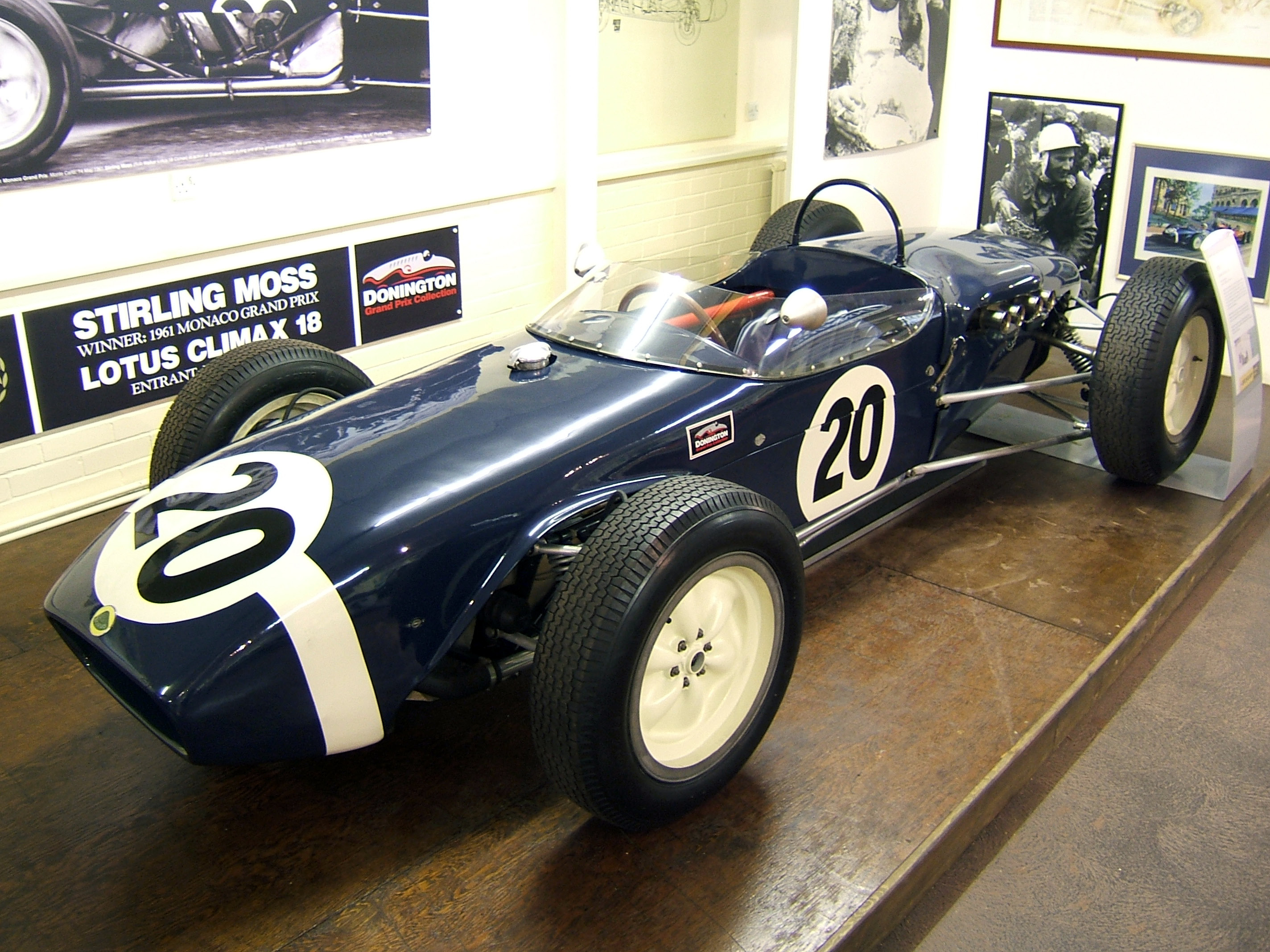
- Lotus 18 Formula One car
- Category: Formula One, Formula Two, Formula Junior
- Constructor: Team Lotus
- Designer: Colin Chapman
- Predecessor: 16
- Successor: 21

Technical specifications
- Chassis: Steel spaceframe
- Suspension (front): Double wishbone, with inboard coilover spring/damper units.
- Suspension (rear): Lower wishbone, top link, and radius rod suspension, with outboard coilover spring/damper units.
- Engine: Coventry Climax FPF 2467 cc / 2497 cc / 1499.8 cc mid-mounted
- Transmission: Lotus (Ansdale-Mundy) 5-speed sequential manual
- Tyres: Dunlop

Competition history
- Notable entrants: Team Lotus; Rob Walker Racing Team; UDT-Laystall Racing Team; Equipe Nationale Belge
- Notable drivers: (United Kingdom) Innes Ireland (United Kingdom) Stirling Moss (United Kingdom) Alan Stacey (United Kingdom) John Surtees (United Kingdom) Jim Clark (United Kingdom) Trevor Taylor
- Debut: 1960 Argentine Grand Prix
| Races | Wins | Podiums | Poles | F/Laps |
|---|---|---|---|---|
| 23 | 4 | 9 | 0 | 0 |
- Constructors' Championships: 0
- Drivers' Championships: 0
- Unless otherwise stated, all data refer to Formula One World Championship Grands Prix only.

The Lotus 18 was a race car designed by Colin Chapman for use by Lotus in Formula One, Formula Two, and Formula Junior, which was used from 1960 until 1966 in F1.

== Overview ==
Lotus 18 was the first mid-engined car built by Lotus and was a marked improvement over Chapman's early and only moderately successful front-engined formula cars, the 12 and 16. It was introduced for the 1960 F1, F2 and FJ seasons, with about 27 examples of the F1 and F2 versions and 110 of the FJ versions. As a stop-gap before the introduction of the 18's successor models, the Lotus 20 for F2/FJ and 21 for F1, some 18 chassis were rebodied with 21 skins to create the interim Lotus 18/21 hybrid derivative.

The 18 was replaced by the Lotus 21 in Formula One and the Lotus 20 in Formula Junior in 1961.

== Design ==
The car was a classic Chapman design, being extremely light and simple; the body was made up of lightweight panels bolted to heavily-triangulated tube frame (spaceframe) chassis. Thus the car was rigid, strong and light, maintaining the 16's forward weight distribution despite the engine moving behind the driver.

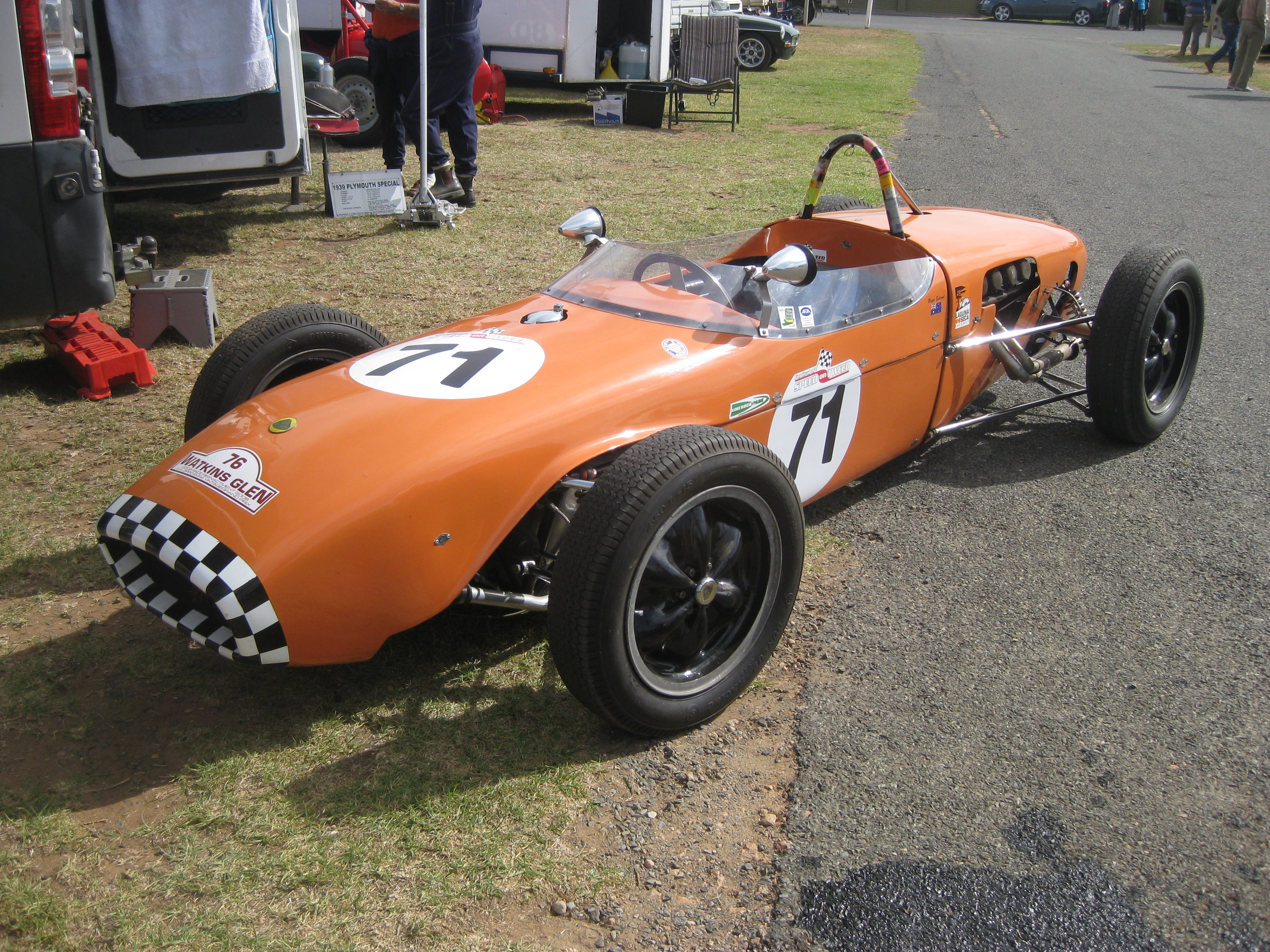
Lotus 18 Formula Junior

It was powered initially by a 2,467 cc Coventry Climax FPF (3.70" x 3.50") four cylinder DOHC engine inherited from the Grand Prix version of Lotus 16. In 1960, the FPF was enlarged slightly to 2497 cc (3.70" x 90 mm), which produced 239 hp (178 kW) at 6,750 rpm from a weight of only 290 lbs (132 kg) and had a wide torque range.

The 2.5 litre engine was replaced by a 1.5 Litre (82 mm x 71 mm) Climax FPF Mk.II with new Formula One engine rules in 1961. The Formula Junior variant used a 998 cc Cosworth Mk.III or a Downton BMC "A" Series with 948cc displacement. The Formula Junior version also used smaller gauge chassis tubing and Alfin drum brakes on all four corners.

Further contributing to the weight advantage was the adoption of lightweight sequential manual transmission originally developed for Lotus 12 by Richard Ansdale and Harry Mundy incorporating the unique sequential-shifting motorcycle gearbox, and a ZF limited-slip differential in a common Magnesium alloy housing to form a transaxle, which also provided the mounting points for inboard rear brakes. This gearbox had been improved in its reliability for Lotus 15 and 16 in 1957-58 by Keith Duckworth, who had just joined Lotus as a gearbox engineer.

Although Porsche in Austria pioneered the sequential-shifting gearbox for racing cars, with the Type 360 Cisitalia, the idea was relatively new and the original transaxle in the Lotus 12, which was essentially an enlarged motorcycle gearbox, combined with ZF limited-slip differential, had gained the nickname "Queerbox", or "Gearbox-full of neutrals" for its poor reliability. With Duckworth having left to form Cosworth in 1958, Mike Costin, who, despite being the co-founder of Cosworth, remained with Lotus for a while longer, adopted the improved Queerbox in the Lotus 16, into a configuration for directly mounting it behind the engine for Lotus 18 with dedicated oil scavenge and pressure feed pumps, further improving its reliability while retaining the small and light design.

The Formula Junior version utilized the Renault 4-speed transaxle, and both of the Lotus transaxle and this Renault 'box had the gear shifter lever on the left side of the driver. An optional gearbox was the VW gearbox with Hewland 4 speed gears. This last gearbox has the added advantage of being able to change gear ratios from behind the gearbox without removing the gearbox from the car.

The front suspension was by double-wishbone arms with an outboard coil/damper unit. Unlike Chapman's former designs where the ends of the anti-roll bar acted as a leg of the upper wishbone, the 18 had a separate front anti-roll bar. The rear suspension was by upper and lower radius arms with a reversed lower wishbone, where the fixed-length half-shaft acted as the upper-link. The coil/damper unit was also mounted outboard in the rear, and the 18 sometimes ran with and without the rear anti-roll bar.

In order to capitalize on the weight advantage, Chapman designed a light, sleek machine only 28 inches (71 cm) high (excluding windscreen) and weighing just 980 lbs (440 kg). To help facilitate this, the driver was placed in a semi-reclining position, pioneered about a decade before by Gustav Baumm of NSU.

== Racing history ==
The Lotus 18's suspension system reduced weight transfer and body roll during cornering. It was described as faster than previous Grand Prix cars, and its design was subsequently widely copied. A two-seat sports-racing version was produced as the Lotus 19, also known as the Monte Carlo.

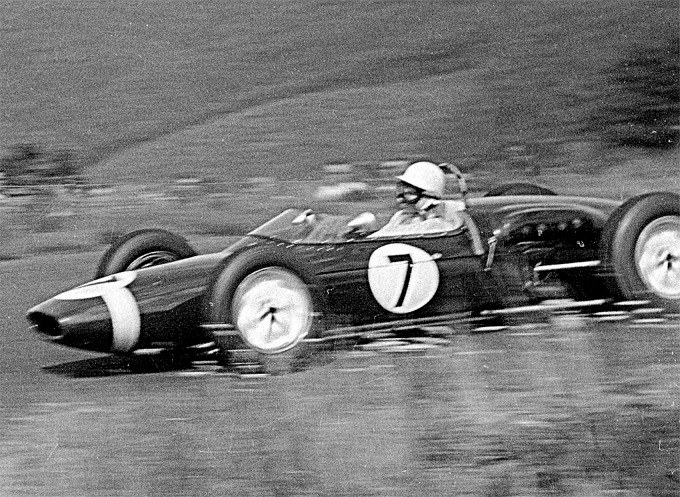
Stirling Moss in Rob Walker's Lotus 18 at the 1961 German Grand Prix

The car took Lotus' first F1 victory, by Innes Ireland in the non-championship Glover Trophy, on 8 April 1960. Its first World Championship win happened six weeks later, on 29 May, albeit by privateer Rob Walker, who leased the car from Chapman. Driven by Stirling Moss the car took a dominant win at the 1960 Monaco Grand Prix. It was an early taste of things to come. Moss also won the United States Grand Prix at the end of the season helping Lotus finish second in the constructors' championship.

Moss repeated his win in a legendary race at Monaco the following year, beating off the more powerful and faster 'sharknose' Ferraris. He then won at the fearsome Nürburgring in changeable weather, while Innes Ireland took a third win in the USA to help Lotus finish second in the constructors' championship in 1961. The Lotus 18 was also notable for giving Jim Clark his first Grand Prix start in 1960.

The Belgian Grand Prix at Spa in 1960 was notable for Moss's accident in the Rob Walker 18 in practice which kept him from the race and the death of Alan Stacey when he left the track in his 18 apparently following a bird strike in the face.

== Complete Formula One results ==
=== Championship results ===
(key) (Results in bold indicate pole position; results in italics indicate fastest lap.)

| Year | Entrant | Engine | Tyres | Drivers | 1 | 2 | 3 | 4 | 5 | 6 | 7 | 8 | 9 | 10 | Points | WCC |
|---|---|---|---|---|---|---|---|---|---|---|---|---|---|---|---|---|
| 1960 | Team Lotus | Climax Straight-4 | D | | ARG | MON | 500 | NED | BEL | FRA | GBR | POR | ITA | USA | **34** | **2nd** |
| 1960 | Team Lotus | Climax Straight-4 | D | Innes Ireland | 6 | 9 | | 2 | Ret | 7 | 3 | 6 | | 2 | **34** | **2nd** |
| 1960 | Team Lotus | Climax Straight-4 | D | Alan Stacey | | Ret | | Ret | Ret | | | | | | **34** | **2nd** |
| 1960 | Team Lotus | Climax Straight-4 | D | John Surtees | | Ret | | | | | 2 | **Ret** | | Ret | **34** | **2nd** |
| 1960 | Team Lotus | Climax Straight-4 | D | Jim Clark | | | | Ret | 5 | 5 | 16 | 3 | | 16 | **34** | **2nd** |
| 1960 | Team Lotus | Climax Straight-4 | D | Ron Flockhart | | | | | | 6 | | | | | **34** | **2nd** |
| 1960 | Rob Walker Racing Team | Climax Straight-4 | D | Stirling Moss | | **1** | | **4** | DNS | | | DSQ | | **1** | **34** | **2nd** |
| 1960 | Taylor-Crawley Racing Team | Climax Straight-4 | D | Mike Taylor | | | | | DNS | | | | | | **34** | **2nd** |
| 1960 | Jim Hall | Climax Straight-4 | D | Jim Hall | | | | | | | | | | 7 | **34** | **2nd** |
| 1961 | Team Lotus | Climax Straight-4 | D | | MON | NED | BEL | FRA | GBR | GER | ITA | USA | | | **32*** | **2nd** |
| 1961 | Team Lotus | Climax Straight-4 | D | Innes Ireland | | | | | | | Ret | | | | **32*** | **2nd** |
| 1961 | Team Lotus | Climax Straight-4 | D | Trevor Taylor | | 13 | | | | | | | | | **32*** | **2nd** |
| 1961 | Rob Walker Racing Team | Climax Straight-4 | D | Stirling Moss | **1** | 4 | 8 | Ret | Ret | 1 | | Ret | | | **32*** | **2nd** |
| 1961 | UDT-Laystall Racing Team | Climax Straight-4 | D | Cliff Allison | 8 | | DNS | | | | | | | | **32*** | **2nd** |
| 1961 | UDT-Laystall Racing Team | Climax Straight-4 | D | Henry Taylor | DNQ | | | 10 | Ret | | 11 | | | | **32*** | **2nd** |
| 1961 | UDT-Laystall Racing Team | Climax Straight-4 | D | Juan Manuel Bordeu | | | | DNS | | | | | | | **32*** | **2nd** |
| 1961 | UDT-Laystall Racing Team | Climax Straight-4 | D | Masten Gregory | | | | | | | Ret | Ret | | | **32*** | **2nd** |
| 1961 | UDT-Laystall Racing Team | Climax Straight-4 | D | Olivier Gendebien | | | | | | | | 11 | | | **32*** | **2nd** |
| 1961 | UDT-Laystall Racing Team | Climax Straight-4 | D | Lucien Bianchi | | | | Ret | Ret | | | | | | **32*** | **2nd** |
| 1961 | Equipe Nationale Belge | Climax Straight-4 | D | Lucien Bianchi | | | Ret | | | | | | | | **32*** | **2nd** |
| 1961 | Equipe Nationale Belge | Climax Straight-4 | D | Willy Mairesse | | | Ret | | | | | | | | **32*** | **2nd** |
| 1961 | Scuderia Colonia | Climax Straight-4 | D | Michael May | Ret | | | 11 | | DNS | | | | | **32*** | **2nd** |
| 1961 | Scuderia Colonia | Climax Straight-4 | D | Wolfgang Seidel | | | | DNS | | 17 | Ret | Ret | | | **32*** | **2nd** |
| 1961 | Camoradi International | Climax Straight-4 | D | Ian Burgess | | DNS | DNS | 14 | 14 | | | | | | **32*** | **2nd** |
| 1961 | Tony Marsh | Climax Straight-4 | D | Tony Marsh | | | DNQ | | Ret | 15 | | | | | **32*** | **2nd** |
| 1961 | Tim Parnell | Climax Straight-4 | D | Tim Parnell | | | | | Ret | | 10 | | | | **32*** | **2nd** |
| 1961 | Gerry Ashmore | Climax Straight-4 | D | Gerry Ashmore | | | | | Ret | 16 | Ret | | | | **32*** | **2nd** |
| 1961 | Louise Bryden-Brown | Climax Straight-4 | D | Tony Maggs | | | | | 13 | 11 | | | | | **32*** | **2nd** |
| 1961 | J Frank Harrison | Climax Straight-4 | D | Lloyd Ruby | | | | | | | | Ret | | | **32*** | **2nd** |
| 1961 | Jim Hall | Climax Straight-4 | D | Jim Hall | | | | | | | | Ret | | | **32*** | **2nd** |
| 1961 | J Wheeler Autosport | Climax Straight-4 | D | Peter Ryan | | | | | | | | 9 | | | **32*** | **2nd** |
| 1961 | Prince Gaetano Starrabba | Maserati Straight-4 | D | Gaetano Starrabba | | | | | | | Ret | | | | 0 | - |
| 1962 | UDT-Laystall Racing Team | Climax Straight-4 | D | | NED | MON | BEL | FRA | GBR | GER | ITA | USA | RSA | | **36*** | **2nd** |
| 1962 | UDT-Laystall Racing Team | Climax Straight-4 | D | Masten Gregory | Ret | | | | | | | | | | **36*** | **2nd** |
| 1962 | Scuderia SSS Republica di Venezia | Climax Straight-4 | D | Nino Vaccarella | | DNQ | | | | | | | | | **36*** | **2nd** |
| 1962 | Emeryson Cars | Climax Straight-4 | D | John Campbell-Jones | | | 11 | | | | | | | | **36*** | **2nd** |
| 1962 | Equipe Nationale Belge | Climax Straight-4 | D | Lucien Bianchi | | | 9 | | | 16 | | | | | **36*** | **2nd** |
| 1962 | Ecurie Excelsior | Climax Straight-4 | D | Jay Chamberlain | | | | | 15 | DNQ | DNQ | | | | **36*** | **2nd** |
| 1962 | Gerry Ashmore | Climax Straight-4 | D | Gerry Ashmore | | | | | | | DNQ | | | | **36*** | **2nd** |
| 1962 | Scuderia Jolly Club | Climax Straight-4 | D | Ernesto Prinoth | | | | | | | DNQ | | | | **36*** | **2nd** |
| 1962 | John Dalton | Climax Straight-4 | D | Tony Shelly | | | | | Ret | DNQ | | | | | **36*** | **2nd** |
| 1962 | John Dalton | BRM V8 | D | Tony Shelly | | | | | | | DNQ | | | | 1* | 8th |
| 1963 | Tim Parnell | Climax Straight-4 | D | | MON | BEL | NED | FRA | GBR | GER | ITA | USA | MEX | RSA | **54*** | **1st** |
| 1963 | Tim Parnell | Climax Straight-4 | D | Tim Parnell | | | | | | DNQ | | | | | **54*** | **1st** |
| 1963 | Tim Parnell | Climax Straight-4 | D | André Pilette | | | | | | DNQ | | | | | **54*** | **1st** |
| 1963 | André Pilette | Climax Straight-4 | D | André Pilette | | | | | | | DNQ | | | | **54*** | **1st** |
| 1963 | Kurt Kuhnke | Borgward Straight-4 | D | Kurt Kuhnke | | | | | | DNQ | | | | | 0 | - |
| 1965 | Clive Puzey Motors | Climax Straight-4 | D | | RSA | MON | BEL | FRA | GBR | NED | GER | ITA | USA | MEX | **54*** | **1st** |
| 1965 | Clive Puzey Motors | Climax Straight-4 | D | Clive Puzey | DNPQ | | | | | | | | | | **54*** | **1st** |

* Includes points scored by other Lotus models

=== Non-Championship results ===
(key)

| Year | Entrant | Engine | Tyres | Drivers | 1 | 2 | 3 | 4 | 5 | 6 | 7 | 8 | 9 | 10 | 11 | 12 | 13 | 14 | 15 | 16 | 17 | 18 | 19 | 20 | 21 |
|---|---|---|---|---|---|---|---|---|---|---|---|---|---|---|---|---|---|---|---|---|---|---|---|---|---|
| 1960 | Team Lotus | Climax Straight-4 | D | | GLV | INT | SIL | LOM | OUL | | | | | | | | | | | | | | | | |
| 1960 | Team Lotus | Climax Straight-4 | D | Innes Ireland | 1 | 1 | Ret | 1 | Ret | | | | | | | | | | | | | | | | |
| 1960 | Team Lotus | Climax Straight-4 | D | John Surtees | | Ret | 6 | Ret | Ret | | | | | | | | | | | | | | | | |
| 1960 | Team Lotus | Climax Straight-4 | D | Alan Stacey | | 4 | | | | | | | | | | | | | | | | | | | |
| 1960 | Team Lotus | Climax Straight-4 | D | Jim Clark | | | **Ret** | 2 | Ret | | | | | | | | | | | | | | | | |
| 1960 | Taylor-Crawley Racing Team | Climax Straight-4 | D | Mike Taylor | | Ret | | | | | | | | | | | | | | | | | | | |
| 1960 | RRC Walker Racing Team | Climax Straight-4 | D | Stirling Moss | | | | | **1** | | | | | | | | | | | | | | | | |
| 1960 | Vandervell Products Ltd. | Vanwall L4 | D | Tony Brooks | | | | DNS | | | | | | | | | | | | | | | | | |
| 1960 | Scuderia Centro Sud | Maserati Straight-4 | D | Ian Burgess | | | | | Ret | | | | | | | | | | | | | | | | |
| 1961 | Team Lotus | Climax Straight-4 | D | | LOM | GLV | PAU | BRX | VIE | AIN | SYR | NAP | LON | SIL | SOL | KAN | DAN | MOD | FLG | OUL | LEW | VAL | RAN | NAT | RSA |
| 1961 | Team Lotus | Climax Straight-4 | D | Jim Clark | 6 | | 1 | Ret | | 9 | 6 | | | | | | 7 | | | | | | | | |
| 1961 | Team Lotus | Climax Straight-4 | D | Innes Ireland | **10** | 5 | | Ret | | 10 | Ret | | | | 9 | Ret | | | | | | | | | |
| 1961 | Team Lotus | Climax Straight-4 | D | Trevor Taylor | | | Ret | | | 19 | | | | 9 | | | | | | Ret | | | | | |
| 1961 | Rob Walker Racing Team | Climax Straight-4 | D | Stirling Moss | | **4** | | 7 | **1** | | 8 | | | **1** | | | | **1** | | | | | | | |
| 1961 | UDT Laystall Racing Team | Climax Straight-4 | D | Stirling Moss | | | | | | | | | | | Ret | 1 | **1** | | | | | | | 2 | 2 |
| 1961 | UDT Laystall Racing Team | Climax Straight-4 | D | Cliff Allison | 2 | 8 | | 5 | | 15 | | | 8 | | | | | | | | | | | | |
| 1961 | UDT Laystall Racing Team | Climax Straight-4 | D | Henry Taylor | 4 | 6 | | Ret | | Ret | | | 2 | 8 | | | 4 | Ret | | 8 | | | | | |
| 1961 | UDT Laystall Racing Team | Climax Straight-4 | D | Carl Hammarlund | | | | | | | | | | | | Ret | | | | | | | | | |
| 1961 | UDT Laystall Racing Team | Climax Straight-4 | D | Masten Gregory | | | | | | | | | | | | | Ret | NC | | 5 | | | Ret | Ret | Ret |
| 1961 | UDT Laystall Racing Team | Climax Straight-4 | D | Jo Bonnier | | | | | | | | | | 11 | | | | | | | | | | | |
| 1961 | Scuderia Colonia | Climax Straight-4 | D | Jo Bonnier | | | 2 | | | | | | | | | | | | | | | | | | |
| 1961 | Scuderia Colonia | Climax Straight-4 | D | Wolfgang Seidel | | | Ret | Ret | 2 | | 11 | | 5 | Ret | | | | DNQ | Ret | 8 | | | | | |
| 1961 | Scuderia Colonia | Climax Straight-4 | D | Maurice Trintignant | | | | DNS | | | | | | | | | | | | | | | | | |
| 1961 | Scuderia Colonia | Climax Straight-4 | D | Michael May | | | | | | Ret | | | | Ret | Ret | | | | | | | | | | |
| 1961 | Tony Marsh | Climax Straight-4 | D | Tony Marsh | | 7 | | 3 | | | | | 3 | 6 | | | | | | | | | | | |
| 1961 | Louise Bryden-Brown | Climax Straight-4 | D | Dan Gurney | | | | | | 14 | | | | 5 | | | | | | | | | | | |
| 1961 | Camoradi International | Climax Straight-4 | D | Ian Burgess | | | Ret | 6 | | DSQ | | 4 | | | | | | | | | | | | | |
| 1961 | Camoradi International | Climax Straight-4 | D | Lloyd Casner | | DNS | | | | DNS | | | | | DNS | | | | | | | | | | |
| 1961 | RHH Parnell; The Three Musketeers | Climax Straight-4 | D | Tim Parnell | 7 | | | | 6 | Ret | | 8 | | 7 | | 5 | 5 | DNQ | 7 | Ret | 3 | | | | |
| 1961 | RHH Parnell; The Three Musketeers | Climax Straight-4 | D | André Pilette | | | | Ret | | | | | | | | | | | | | | | | | |
| 1961 | RHH Parnell; The Three Musketeers | Climax Straight-4 | D | Gerry Ashmore | | | | | Ret | 11 | | **2** | | | | | | | | | | | | | |
| 1961 | Gerry Ashmore | Climax Straight-4 | D | Gerry Ashmore | | | | | | | | | | | | | | | | | DNA | | | | |
| 1961 | Scuderia Dolomiti | Climax Straight-4 | D | Ernesto Prinoth | | | | | 3 | | DNS | 10 | | | | | | | Ret | | | 2 | | | |
| 1961 | Jack Holme | Climax Straight-4 | D | Jack Holme | | | | | | | | | | | | | | | | | | | Ret | WD | |
| 1961 | Prince G. Starabba | Maserati Straight-4 | D | Giorgio Scarlatti | | | | | | | | | | | | | | Ret | | | | | | | |
| 1961 | Prince G. Starabba | Maserati Straight-4 | D | Gaetano Starrabba | | | | | | | | | | | | | | | | | | Ret | | | |
| 1961 | Syd van der Vyver | Alfa Romeo Straight-4 | D | Syd van der Vyver | | | | | | | | | | | | | | | | | | | 7 | 5 | 6 |
| 1961 | Equipe Judette | Ford Straight-4 | D | Bob van Niekerk | | | | | | | | | | | | | | | | | | | 9 | Ret | 9 |
| 1961 | Bernard Podmore | Ford Straight-4 | D | Bernard Podmore | | | | | | | | | | | | | | | | | | | Ret | WD | Ret |
| 1961 | Neville Lederle | Ford Straight-4 | D | Neville Lederle | | | | | | | | | | | | | | | | | | | | Ret | |
| 1961 | Ecurie Wolman | Borgward Straight-4 | D | Helmut Menzler | | | | | | | | | | | | | | | | | | | Ret | Ret | 10 |
| 1962 | UDT-Laystall Racing Team | Climax Straight-4 | D | | CAP | BRX | LOM | LAV | GLV | PAU | AIN | INT | NAP | MAL | CPL | RMS | SOL | KAN | MED | DAN | OUL | MEX | RAN | NAT | |
| 1962 | UDT-Laystall Racing Team | Climax Straight-4 | D | Masten Gregory | 4 | Ret | Ret | | 5 | | Ret | | | 5 | | | | | | | | | | | |
| 1962 | UDT-Laystall Racing Team | Climax Straight-4 | D | Innes Ireland | | 3 | Ret | | 3 | | Ret | | | | | | | | | | | | | | |
| 1962 | UDT-Laystall Racing Team | Climax Straight-4 | D | Stirling Moss | | | **7** | | **Ret** | | | | | | | | | | | | | | | | |
| 1962 | Rob Walker Racing Team | Climax Straight-4 | D | Stirling Moss | | Ret | | | | | | | | | | | | | | | | | | | |
| 1962 | Rob Walker Racing Team | Climax Straight-4 | D | Maurice Trintignant | | | | | | 1 | | Ret | | | | | | | | | | | | | |
| 1962 | Rob Walker Racing Team | Climax Straight-4 | D | Graham Hill | | | | | | | | | | 3 | | | | | | | | | | | |
| 1962 | Scuderia SSS Republica di Venezia | Climax Straight-4 | D | Nino Vaccarella | | DNQ | | | | 6 | | Ret | | | | | | | Ret | | | | | | |
| 1962 | Scuderia SSS Republica di Venezia | Climax Straight-4 | D | Colin Davis | | | | | | | | | | Ret | | | | | | | | | | | |
| 1962 | Scuderia SSS Republica di Venezia | Climax Straight-4 | D | Carlo Abate | | | | | | | | | | | | Ret | | | | | | | | | |
| 1962 | RHH Parnell | Climax Straight-4 | D | Tim Parnell | | | Ret | | | | 9 | Ret | 7 | | | | | | | | | | | | |
| 1962 | RHH Parnell | Climax Straight-4 | D | John Dalton | | | | | | | | | | Ret | | | | | | | | | | | |
| 1962 | RHH Parnell | Climax Straight-4 | D | Gary Hocking | | | | | | | | | | | | | | | Ret | Ret | | | | | |
| 1962 | John Dalton | Climax Straight-4 | D | Tony Shelly | | | 5 | 3 | 6 | | 7 | Ret | 6 | 8 | | Ret | | | | | 5 | | | | |
| 1962 | Ecurie Excelsior | Climax Straight-4 | D | Jay Chamberlain | | | | 5 | Ret | | DSQ | 16 | DNQ | | Ret | | | | Ret | | | 9 | | | |
| 1962 | Ecurie Excelsior | Climax Straight-4 | D | Olle Nygren | | | | | | | | | | | | | | Ret | | | | | | | |
| 1962 | Gerry Ashmore | Climax Straight-4 | D | Gerry Ashmore | | | | Ret | 9 | | | | | | | | | | | | 8 | | | | |
| 1962 | Gerry Ashmore | Climax Straight-4 | D | Graham Eden | | | | | | | | | | | Ret | | | | | | Ret | | | | |
| 1962 | Speed Sport | Climax Straight-4 | D | David Piper | | | | | | | 11 | 17 | 8 | | 7 | | | | | | | | | | |
| 1962 | A. Robinson & Sons | Climax Straight-4 | D | Philip Robinson | | | | | | | | | | | | | | | | | Ret | | | | |
| 1962 | Walter Hansgen | Climax Straight-4 | D | Walt Hansgen | | | | | | | | | | | | | | | | | | Ret | | | |
| 1962 | Jim Hall | Climax Straight-4 | D | Homer Rader | | | | | | | | | | | | | | | | | | 8 | | | |
| 1962 | Jack Holme | Climax Straight-4 | D | Jack Holme | | | | | | | | | | | | | | | | | | | DNQ | Ret | |
| 1962 | Autosport Team Wolfgang Seidel | Climax Straight-4 | D | Günther Seiffert | | | | Ret | WD | | 12 | | DNQ | | Ret | | NC | | 9 | | 10 | | | | |
| 1962 | Autosport Team Wolfgang Seidel | Climax Straight-4 | D | Kurt Kuhnke | | | | | | DNQ | | | | | | | Ret | | | | | | | | |
| 1962 | Kurt Kuhnke | Borgward Straight-4 | D | Kurt Kuhnke | | | | | | | | | | | | | | DNA | DNA | DNA | | | | | |
| 1962 | Ecurie Wolman | Borgward Straight-4 | D | Helmut Menzler | 10 | | | | | | | | | | | | | | | | | | | | |
| 1962 | Vern McWilliams | Borgward Straight-4 | D | Vern McWilliams | | | | | | | | | | | | | | | | | | | DNQ | DNQ | |
| 1962 | Prince G. Starabba | Maserati Straight-4 | D | Gaetano Starrabba | | | | | | | | | Ret | | | | | | | | | | | | |
| 1962 | Syd van der Vyver | Alfa Romeo Straight-4 | D | Syd van der Vyver | 7 | | | | | | | | | | | | | | | | | | | | |
| 1962 | Bill Scheepers | Alfa Romeo Straight-4 | D | Bill Scheepers | | | | | | | | | | | | | | | | | | | | DNQ | |
| 1962 | Equipe Judette | Ford Straight-4 | D | Bob van Niekerk | 11 | | | | | | | | | | | | | | | | | | | | |
| 1962 | Bernard Podmore | Ford Straight-4 | D | Bernard Podmore | 13 | | | | | | | | | | | | | | | | | | | | |
| 1962 | Neville Lederle | Ford Straight-4 | D | Neville Lederle | 14 | | | | | | | | | | | | | | | | | | | | |
| 1962 | Ted Lanfear | Ford Straight-4 | D | Peter van Niekerk | | | | | | | | | | | | | | | | | | | DNQ | DNQ | |
| 1963 | A. Robinson & Sons | Climax Straight-4 | D | | LOM | GLV | PAU | IMO | SYR | AIN | INT | ROM | SOL | KAN | MED | AUT | OUL | RAN | | | | | | | |
| 1963 | A. Robinson & Sons | Climax Straight-4 | D | Brian Robinson | Ret | | | | | | | | | | | | | | | | | | | | |
| 1963 | A. Robinson & Sons | Climax Straight-4 | D | Philip Robinson | | 8 | | | | | Ret | | | | | | | | | | | | | | |
| 1963 | RHH Parnell | Climax Straight-4 | D | Philip Robinson | | | | | | | | | NC | | | | | | | | | | | | |
| 1963 | RHH Parnell | Climax Straight-4 | D | Tim Parnell | | | 7 | | | DSQ | Ret | 9 | | | | | | | | | | | | | |
| 1963 | RHH Parnell | Climax Straight-4 | D | Ron Carter | | | | | | | | | Ret | WD | | | | | | | | | | | |
| 1963 | RHH Parnell | Climax Straight-4 | D | André Pilette | | | Ret | | | | | | 12 | 10 | | 9 | 12 | | | | | | | | |
| 1963 | André Pilette | Climax Straight-4 | D | André Pilette | | | | | | DNS | DNS | | | | | | | | | | | | | | |
| 1963 | Ernesto Prinoth | Climax Straight-4 | D | Ernesto Prinoth | | | | 8 | | | | | | | | | | | | | | | | | |
| 1963 | Scuderia Jolly Club | Climax Straight-4 | D | Ernesto Prinoth | | | | | | | | | | | | Ret | | | | | | | | | |
| 1963 | Jock Russell | Climax Straight-4 | D | Jock Russell | | | | | | Ret | | | | | | | | | | | | | | | |
| 1963 | Jack Holme | Climax Straight-4 | D | Jack Holme | | | | | | | | | | | | | | Ret | | | | | | | |
| 1963 | Prince G. Starabba | Maserati Straight-4 | D | Gaetano Starrabba | | | | Ret | 6 | | | 5 | | | DNQ | | | | | | | | | | |
| 1963 | Kurt Kuhnke | Borgward Straight-4 | D | Kurt Kuhnke | | | | | | | | DNQ | Ret | Ret | | | | | | | | | | | |
| 1963 | Kurt Kuhnke | Borgward Straight-4 | D | Ernst Maring | | | | | | | | DNQ | Ret | Ret | | | | | | | | | | | |
| 1964 | Jock Russell | Climax Straight-4 | D | | DMT | NWT | SYR | AIN | INT | SOL | MED | RAN | | | | | | | | | | | | | |
| 1964 | Jock Russell | Climax Straight-4 | D | Jock Russell | Ret | | | | | | | | | | | | | | | | | | | | |
| 1964 | Clive Puzey Motors | Climax Straight-4 | D | Clive Puzey | | | | | | | | 8 | | | | | | | | | | | | | |
| 1964 | Kurt Kuhnke | Borgward Straight-4 | D | Ernst Maring | | | | | | Ret | | | | | | | | | | | | | | | |
| 1964 | Kurt Kuhnke | Borgward Straight-4 | D | Joachim Diel | | | | | | Ret | | | | | | | | | | | | | | | |
| 1965 | Scuderia Nord-Ouest | Climax Straight-4 | D | | ROC | SYR | SMT | INT | MED | RAN | | | | | | | | | | | | | | | |
| 1965 | Scuderia Nord-Ouest | Climax Straight-4 | D | Colin Davis | | | | | DNQ | | | | | | | | | | | | | | | | |
| 1965 | Clive Puzey Motors | Climax Straight-4 | D | Clive Puzey | | | | | | 9 | | | | | | | | | | | | | | | |
| 1966 | Clive Puzey Motors | Climax Straight-4 | D | | RSA | SYR | INT | OUL | | | | | | | | | | | | | | | | | |
| 1966 | Clive Puzey Motors | Climax Straight-4 | D | Clive Puzey | 7 | | | | | | | | | | | | | | | | | | | | |
