= Willy Mairesse =

Belgian racing driver (1928–1969)

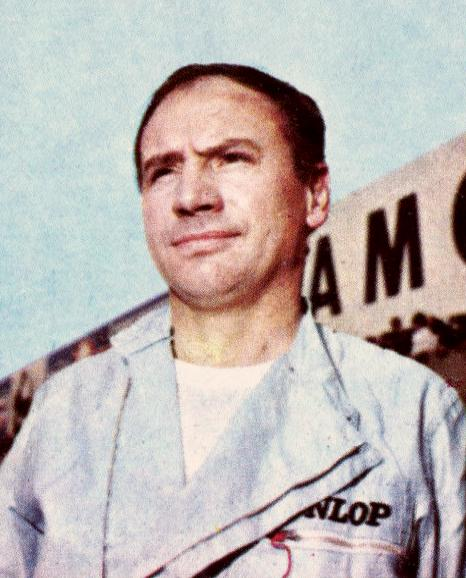
- Born: Willem Edouard Numa Ghislain Mairesse; 1 October 1928; Momignies, Hainaut, Belgium
- Died: 2 September 1969 (aged 40); Ostend, Belgium

Formula One World Championship career
- Nationality: (Belgium) Belgian
- Active years: 1960–1963, 1965
- Team(s): Ferrari, ENB, Lotus, Scuderia Centro Sud
- Entries: 13 (12 starts)
- Championships: 0
- Wins: 0
- Podiums: 1
- Career points: 7
- Pole positions: 0
- Fastest laps: 0
- First entry: 1960 Belgian Grand Prix
- Last entry: 1965 Belgian Grand Prix

Willem Edouard Numa Ghislain Mairesse (French pronunciation: [wi.li mɛ.ʁɛs]; 1 October 1928 – 2 September 1969) was a Formula One and sports-car driver from Belgium. He participated in 13 World Championship Grands Prix, debuting on 19 June 1960. He achieved one podium and scored a total of seven championship points. He committed suicide (overdose of sleeping pills) in a hotel room in Ostend after a crash at the 1968 24 Hours of Le Mans forced an end to his career.

Peter Revson once described the intensity of Mairesse before a race at Spa, Belgium. Revson looked into his car and saw Mairesse's "furrowed" face, beetled brows, and eyes which were almost tilted and their colour changed. "It was almost like looking at the devil."

== Sports car driver ==
Mairesse won first place in the marathon rally Liege-Rome-Liege in 1956. Mairesse secured third place in the Grand Prix of Monza in June 1959. Driving a Ferrari, he placed behind Alfonso Thiele and Carlo Mario Abate, both also in Ferraris. Mairesse and Mike Parkes of England finished second to Phil Hill and Olivier Gendebien at the 1961 24 Hours of Le Mans. Driving a Ferrari 250 TR/61, Mairesse and Parkes also eclipsed the previous Le Mans record, covering 2,758.66 miles. In the 1963 12 Hours of Sebring, Mairesse and Nino Vacarella placed second after Ludovico Scarfiotti and John Surtees. Both teams drove Ferraris. Surtees and Mairesse won the 1000 km of the Nurburgring driving a Ferrari 250P. Thereafter, Surtees and Mairesse led for the 15 hours of the first 18 hours of the 1963 24 Hours of Le Mans before the car caught fire while Mairesse was driving. Mairesse escaped injury. Scarfiotti and Lorenzo Bandini won on the French circuit where Christian Heins had a fatal accident. Mairesse and Surtees retired after a motor fire. A young German Red Cross worker was killed in August 1963 when the wheel of a Ferrari driven by Mairesse came off as his car overturned. Guenther Schneider, 19, was hit by a flying wheel during the running of the German Grand Prix at the Nürburgring and died. Mairesse was triumphant in the 1964 Grand Prix of Angola, run at Luanda. His average speed was 80.78 miles per hour. Mairesse piloted a Ferrari 250 LM to first place in the 500 km sportscar race of Spa in May 1965. He completed the race in 2 hours, 29 minutes, and 45.7 seconds. He achieved an average speed of 126.29. Mairesse and Jean Beurlys of France finished third at the 1965 24 Hours of Le Mans in a Ferrari 275 GTB winning the GT category in its debut at Le Mans, while Masten Gregory and Jochen Rindt won the race. In April 1966 Surtees and Parkes won the 1,000 kilometer Monza Auto Race. Mairesse and Herbert Mueller of Switzerland came in third in a Ford sports car, two laps behind. In May Mairesse and Mueller drove to victory in the Targa Florio, driving a Porsche Carrera 6. Rain caused considerable attrition as only thirteen of seventy starters finished the race. Mairesse and Beurlys again drove a Ferrari to third place in the 1967 24 Hours of Le Mans. This event was won by the American team of Dan Gurney and A. J. Foyt.

== Formula One ==
Mairesse was third in the Grand Prix of Europe, 1960 Italian Grand Prix. This was the penultimate race of the 1960 Formula One World Championship. Run at the Autodromo Nazionale Monza, Phil Hill was victorious, with Richie Ginther second, and Mairesse third, a lap down. Mairesse qualified fifth for the 1962 Belgian Grand Prix at Spa. The pole was won by Graham Hill in a BRM. During the event Mairesse and the Lotus of Trevor Taylor dueled for more than an hour, passing and repassing a number of times each lap. Mairesse was cheered heartily by an enthusiastic partisan crowd. The two cars came together at more than 100 miles per hour in the long, sweeping left-hand Blanchimont turn. Mairesse's car went off to the left, careering into a hillside behind a ditch and catching fire after flipping over. He was thrown out of his Ferrari and his shoes and the legs of his trousers were torn off. He was conscious, despite numerous scrapes, cuts and burns. Mairesse was loaded into an ambulance and transported to a hospital, where he was reported to be in good spirits and without any serious injuries. Taylor and Mairesse made contact earlier in the season at the Grand Prix of Brussels. In a race in which only twelve of twenty-one starters finished, Mairesse came in fourth in the 1962 Italian Grand Prix. He was only a car length ahead of Giancarlo Baghetti.

Out of Formula One in 1963, Phil Hill predicted a rough future for the Ferrari team. He said there was too much competition between Mairesse and Surtees. Specifically, he commented "they will harry each other so much that they will force each other to make mistakes". Mairesse's car crashed during the 1963 German Grand Prix. The Ferrari turned over multiple times after swerving off the track. He was rushed to the hospital with a broken arm. His teammate, Surtees, won the race, with Jim Clark second in a Lotus.

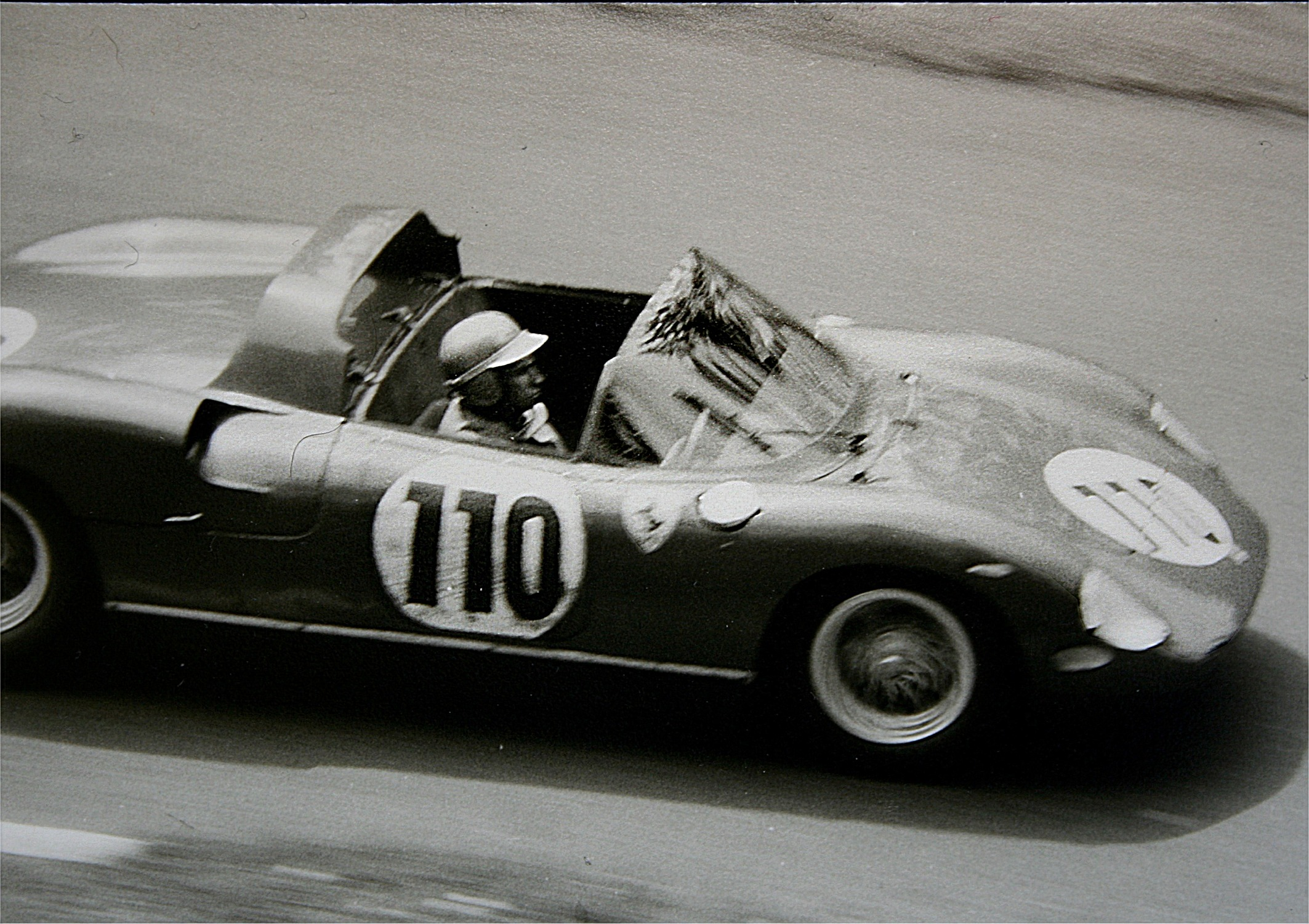
Mairesse at the Nürburgring in 1963.

== Career-ending crash and death ==
Mairesse continued in sports car racing, and entered the 1968 24 Hours of Le Mans driving a Ford GT40 with co-driver Jean Blaton (going under the pseudonym “Beurlys”). Mairesse started the car, but during the chaotic standing start, it is believed that he failed to close the driver door properly. As he came to the end of the Mulsanne Straight on the first lap, the door flew open, causing Mairesse to lose control and crash violently in to the roadside trees. Mairesse suffered head injures, several broken bones, and severe burns. As a result of the injuries, he was left in a coma for over two weeks.

Mairesse survived the injuries from the wreck, but suffered physical and mental impairments that prevented him from returning to racing, including limited mobility. He fell in to depression over the end of his racing career, and on 2 September 1969, Mairesse committed suicide by overdosing on sleeping pills in a hotel room in Ostend at the age of 40. His suicide came less than 12 months after his career ending accident.

== Racing record ==
=== Complete Formula One World Championship results ===
(key) (Races in bold indicate pole position)

Year	Entrant	Chassis	Engine	1	2	3	4	5	6	7	8	9	10	WDC	Points
1960	Scuderia Ferrari	Ferrari Dino 246	Ferrari V6	ARG	MON	500	NED	BEL; Ret	FRA; Ret	GBR	POR	ITA; 3	USA	15th	4
1961	Equipe Nationale Belge	Lotus 18	Climax Straight-4	MON	NED	BEL; Ret								NC	0
1961	Team Lotus	Lotus 21	Climax Straight-4				FRA; Ret	GBR						NC	0
1961	Scuderia Ferrari	Ferrari 156	Ferrari V6						GER; Ret	ITA	USA			NC	0
1962	Scuderia Ferrari	Ferrari 156	Ferrari V6	NED	MON; 7†	BEL; Ret	FRA	GBR	GER	ITA; 4	USA	RSA		14th	3
1963	Scuderia Ferrari	Ferrari 156	Ferrari V6	MON; Ret	BEL; Ret	NED	FRA	GBR	GER; Ret	ITA	USA	MEX	RSA	NC	0
1965	Scuderia Centro Sud	BRM P57	BRM V8	RSA	MON	BEL; DNS	FRA	GBR	NED	GER	ITA	USA	MEX	NC	0

† Driver did not finish the race, but was still classified.

=== Non-Championship Formula One results ===
(key) (Races in bold indicate pole position) (Races in italics indicate fastest lap)

Year	Entrant	Chassis	Engine	1	2	3	4	5	6	7	8	9	10	11	12	13	14	15	16	17	18	19	20	21
1961	Equipe Nationale Belge	Emeryson Mk2	Maserati L4	LOM	GLV	PAU	BRX; 8	VIE	AIN; DNA	SYR; 11	NAP	LON	SIL	SOL; DNA	KAN	DAN	MOD	FLG	OUL	LEW	VAL	RAN	NAT	RSA
1962	Scuderia Ferrari	Ferrari 156	Ferrari V6	CAP	BRX; 1	LOM	LAV	GLV	PAU	AIN	INT	NAP; 1	MAL	CLP	RMS; DNA	SOL	KAN	MED	DAN	OUL	MEX	RAN	NAT	
1963	Scuderia Ferrari	Ferrari 156	Ferrari V6	LOM	GLV	PAU	IMO; DNA	SYR	AIN	INT; Ret	ROM	SOL	KAN	MED	AUT	OUL	RAN							

=== 24 Hours of Le Mans results ===
Year	Team	Co-Driver(s)	Car	Class	Laps	Pos.	Class Pos.
1958	(Belgium) Ecurie Francorchamps	(Belgium) Lucien Bianchi	Ferrari 250 TR	S 3.0	33	DNF	DNF
1960	(Italy) Scuderia Ferrari	(United States) Richie Ginther	Ferrari 250 TRI/60	S 3.0	204	DNF	DNF
1961	(Italy) SEFAC Ferrari	(United Kingdom) Mike Parkes	Ferrari 250 TRI/61	S 3.0	330	**2nd**	**2nd**
1963	(Italy) SpA Ferrari SEFAC	(United Kingdom) John Surtees	Ferrari 250P	P 3.0	252	DNF	DNF
1965	(Belgium) Ecurie Francorchamps	(Belgium) “Beurlys” (Jean Blaton)	Ferrari 275 GTB	GT 4.0	340	**3rd**	**1st**
1966	(Switzerland) Scuderia Filipinetti	(Switzerland) Herbert Müller	Ferrari 365 P2	P 5.0	166	DNF	DNF
1967	(Belgium) Equipe Nationale Belge	(Belgium) “Beurlys” (Jean Blaton)	Ferrari 330 P4	P 5.0	377	**3rd**	**3rd**
1968	(Belgium) C. Dubois	(Belgium) “Beurlys” (Jean Blaton)	Ford GT40	S 5.0	0	DNF	DNF

=== 24 Hours of Spa results ===
Year	Team	Co-Drivers	Car	Class	Laps	Pos.	Class Pos.
1965	(Germany) BMW Motorsport	(Germany) Hubert Hahne	BMW 1800 TI/SA	T 2.5		DSQ	DSQ
1966	(Germany) BMW Motorsport	(Germany) Dieter Glemser	BMW 1800 TI	T 2.0		DNF	DNF
