= Gerhard Mitter =

German racing driver (1935–1969)

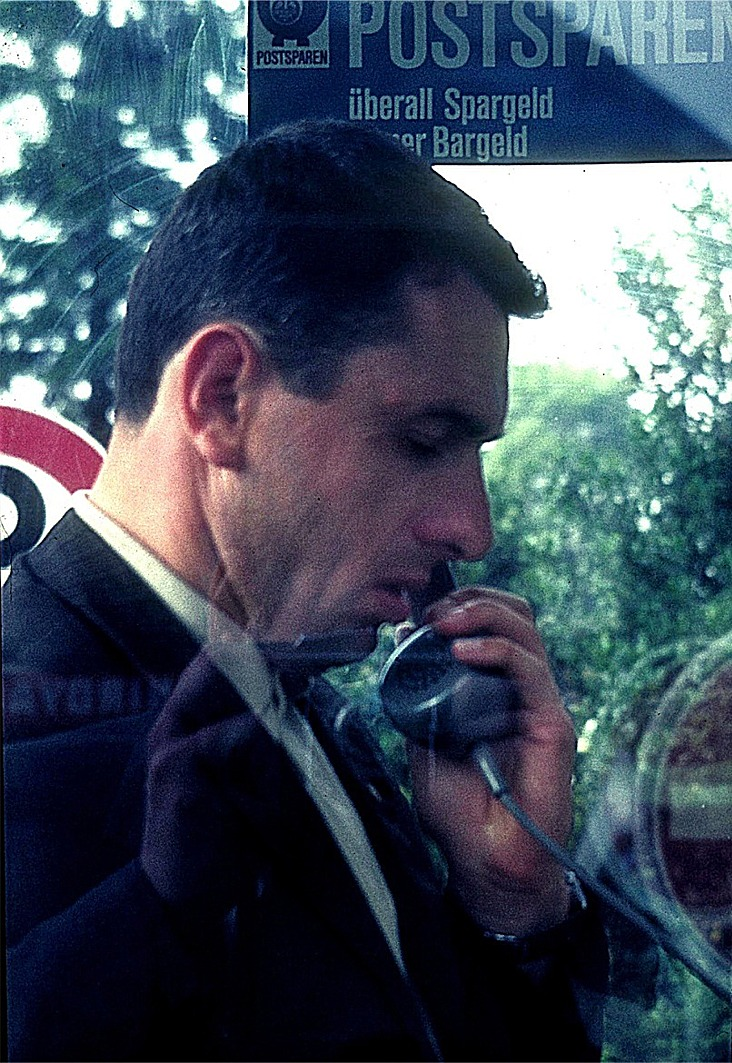
- Mitter in 1968
- Born: Gerhard Karl Mitter; 30 August 1935; Krásná Lípa, Czechoslovakia
- Died: 1 August 1969 (aged 33); Nürburgring Circuit, Germany

Formula One World Championship career
- Nationality: (Germany) German
- Active years: 1963–1967, 1969
- Team(s): Lotus (incl. non-works), BMW, non-works Brabham, non-works Porsche
- Entries: 7 (5 starts)
- Championships: 0
- Wins: 0
- Podiums: 0
- Career points: 3
- Pole positions: 0
- Fastest laps: 0
- First entry: 1963 Dutch Grand Prix
- Last entry: 1969 German Grand Prix

Gerhard Karl Mitter (30 August 1935 – 1 August 1969) was a German Formula One and sportscar driver.

== Early life and career ==
Mitter was born in Schönlinde (Krásná Lípa) in Czechoslovakia, but his family was expelled from there, to Leonberg near Stuttgart.

After racing motorbikes, Mitter switched to Formula Junior, becoming the best German driver with 40 victories. In addition, he sold two-stroke engines for FJ. In 1963, Mitter won the Formula Junior Eifelrennen at the Nürburgring.

== Formula One ==
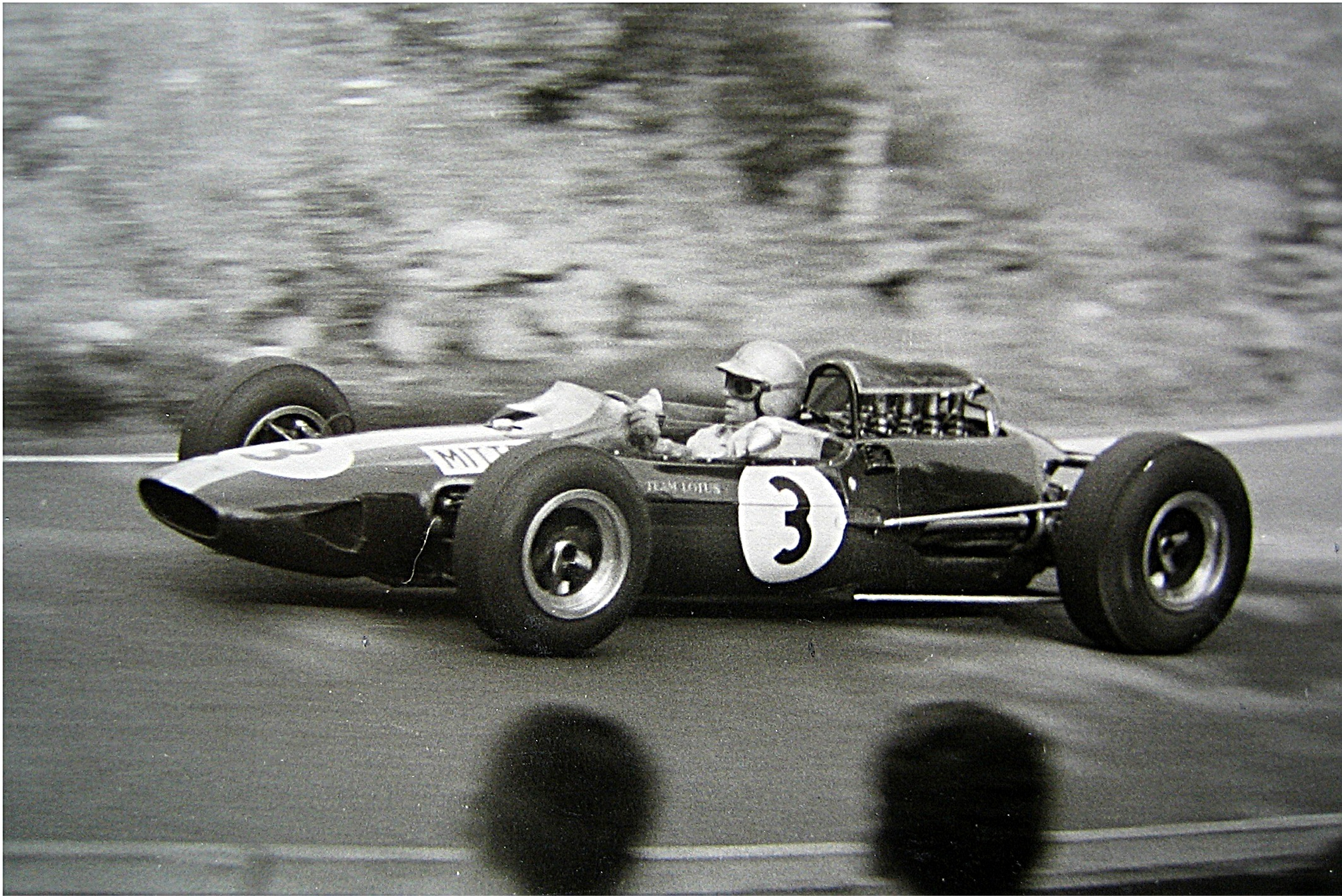
Gerhard Mitter driving a Lotus 25 in 1965 at the Nürburgring

Mitter also participated in seven Grands Prix, debuting on 23 June 1963. He scored a total of three championship points in his home 1963 German Grand Prix with a Porsche 718 from 1961. Impressed by this, Team Lotus gave him a chance in the following years.

== Sportscar driver ==
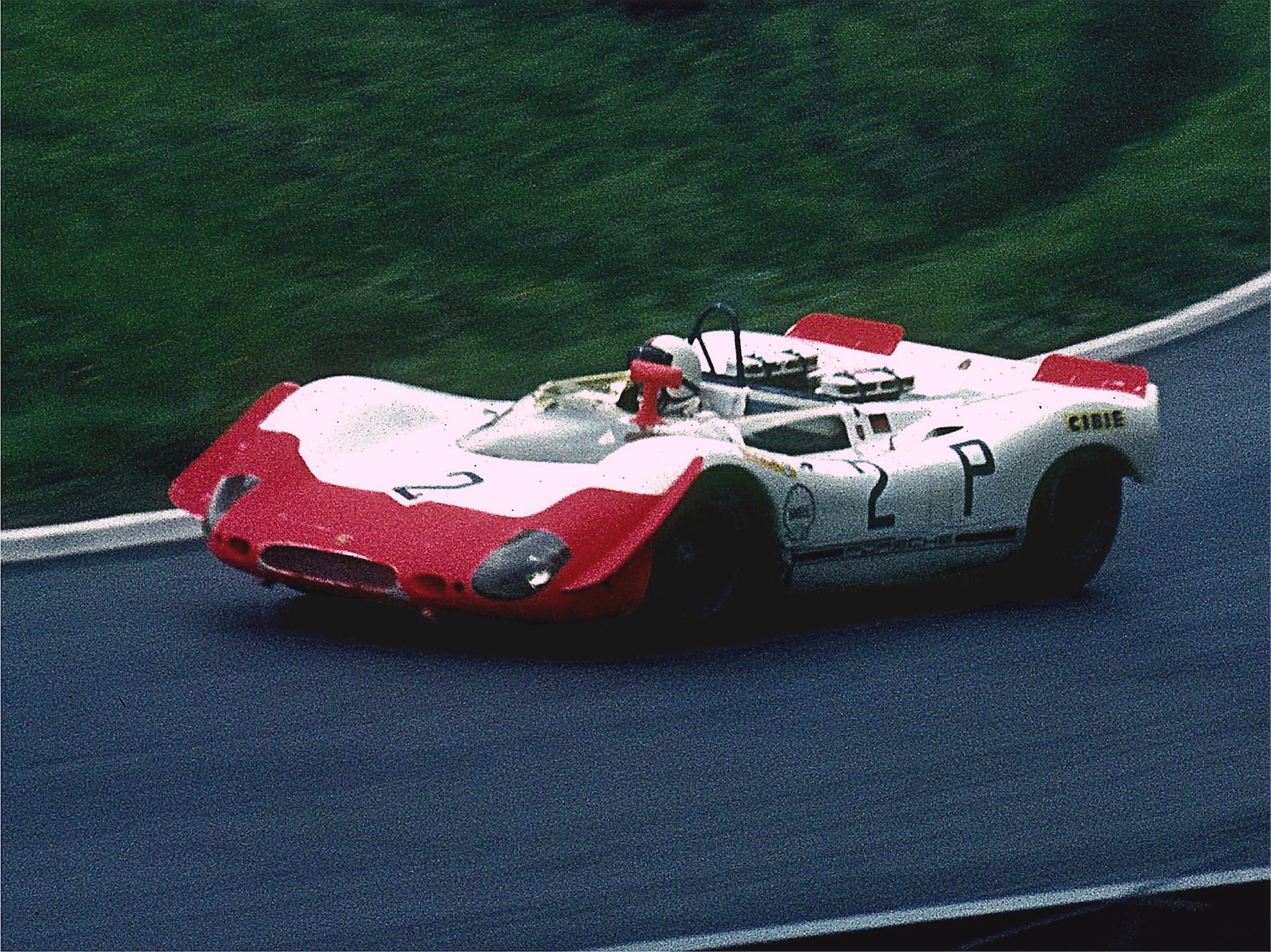
Gerhard Mitter driving a Porsche 908 during the 1969 1000 km race at the Nürburgring.

In sportscar racing and hillclimbing for Porsche, he scored many wins, e.g. the 1966-1968 European Hillclimb Championships against Ferrari, the 1966 24 Hours of Daytona (Porsche 907, in class) and the 1969 Targa Florio (Porsche 908) as his final major win.

== Return to Formula One and death ==
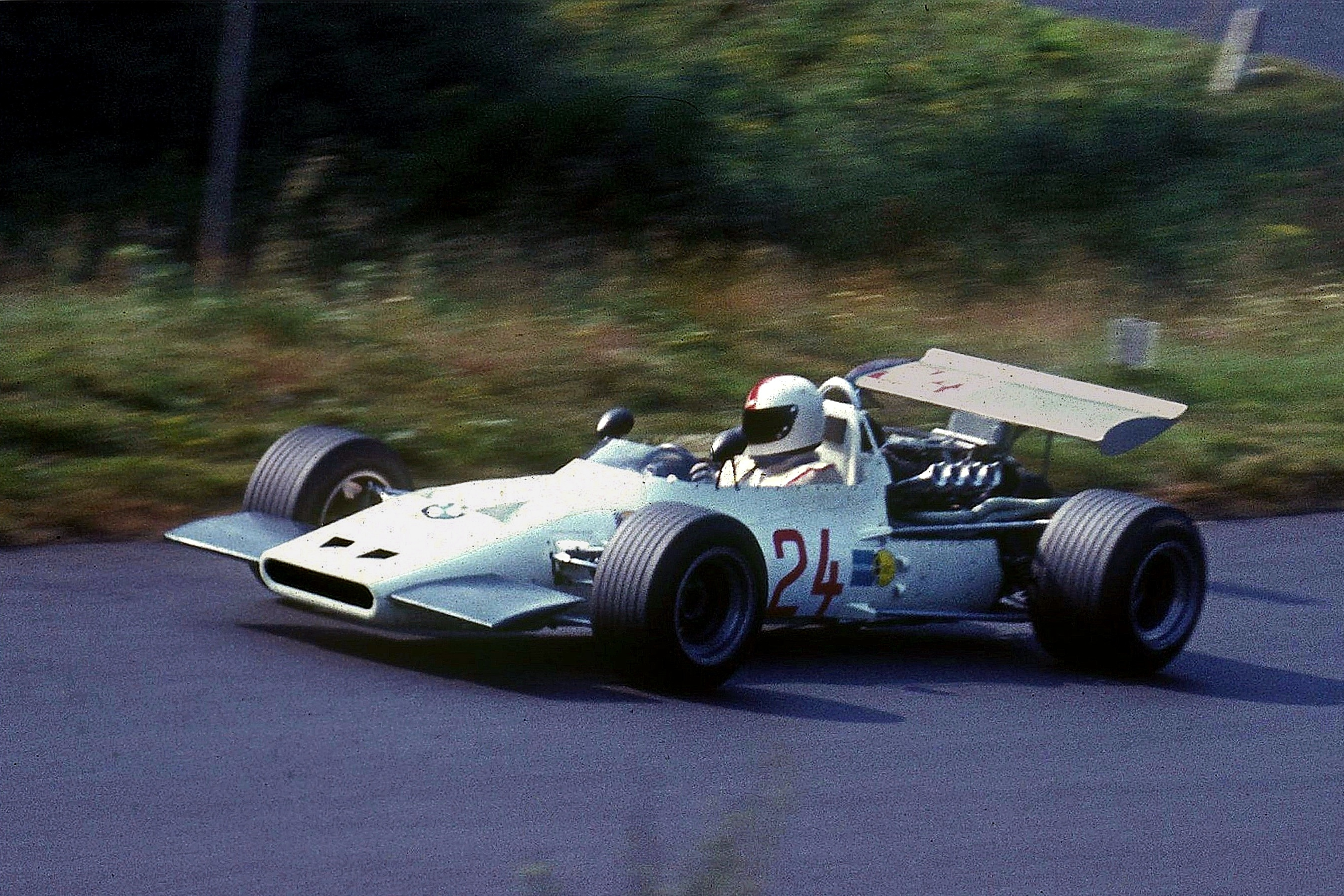
Gerhard Mitter driving the BMW F269 at the Nürburgring shortly before he was killed, August 1, 1969

Due to the long Nürburgring track, it was possible to take part in the German Grand Prix with Formula 2 cars that were classified in their own contest. Mitter was killed there at Schwedenkreuz while practising for the 1969 German Grand Prix with BMW's 269 F2 project. As a suspension or steering failure was suspected, the BMW team with Hubert Hahne and Dieter Quester withdrew from the race, as did Mitter's teammate at Porsche, Hans Herrmann. Udo Schütz, his driving partner at Porsche in the 1969 World Sportscar Championship season with whom he had won the Targa three months earlier, had survived a bad crash at the 1969 24 Hours of Le Mans, and retired.

== Racing record ==
=== Complete Formula One World Championship results ===
(key)

| Year | Entrant | Chassis | Engine | 1 | 2 | 3 | 4 | 5 | 6 | 7 | 8 | 9 | 10 | 11 | WDC | Pts |
|---|---|---|---|---|---|---|---|---|---|---|---|---|---|---|---|---|
| 1963 | Ecurie Maarsbergen | Porsche 718 | Porsche 547/3 1.5 F4 | MON | BEL | NED; Ret | FRA | GBR | GER; 4 | ITA | USA | MEX | RSA | | 12th= | 3 |
| 1964 | Team Lotus | Lotus 25 | Climax FWMV 1.5 V8 | MON | NED | BEL | FRA | GBR | GER; 9 | AUT | ITA | USA | MEX | | NC | 0 |
| 1965 | Team Lotus | Lotus 25 | Climax FWMV 1.5 V8 | RSA | MON | BEL | FRA | GBR | NED | GER; Ret | ITA | USA | MEX | | NC | 0 |
| 1966 | Ron Harris Team Lotus | Lotus 44 F2 | Ford Cosworth SCA 1.0 L4 | MON | BEL | FRA | GBR | NED | GER; DNS | ITA | USA | MEX | | | NC | 0 |
| 1967 | Gerhard Mitter | Brabham BT23 F2 | Ford Cosworth FVA 1.6 L4 | RSA | MON | NED | BEL | FRA | GBR | GER; Ret | CAN | ITA | USA | MEX | NC | 0 |
| 1969 | Bayerische Motoren Werke AG | BMW 269 F2 | BMW M12/1 1.6 L4 | RSA | ESP | MON | NED | FRA | GBR | GER; DNS | ITA | CAN | USA | MEX | NC | 0 |

=== Complete Formula One Non-Championship results ===
(key)

| Year | Entrant | Chassis | Engine | 1 | 2 | 3 | 4 | 5 | 6 | 7 | 8 | 9 | 10 | 11 | 12 | 13 | 14 | 15 | 16 | 17 | 18 | 19 | 20 |
|---|---|---|---|---|---|---|---|---|---|---|---|---|---|---|---|---|---|---|---|---|---|---|---|
| 1962 | Ecurie Filipinetti | Lotus 21 | Climax FPF 1.5 L4 | CAP | BRX | LOM | LAV | GLV | PAU | AIN | INT | NAP | MAL | CLP | RMS | SOL; 6 | KAN | MED | DAN | OUL | MEX | RAN | NAT |
| 1963 | Ecurie Maarsbergen | Porsche 718 | Porsche 547/3 1.5 F4 | LOM | GLV | PAU | IMO | SYR | AIN | INT | ROM | SOL; 5 | KAN | MED | AUT | OUL | RAN | | | | | | |
| 1964 | Team Lotus | Lotus 25 | Climax FWMV 1.5 V8 | DMT | NWT | SYR | AIN | INT | SOL; Ret | MED | RAN | | | | | | | | | | | | |

=== Complete European Formula Two Championship results ===
(key)

| Year | Entrant | Chassis | Engine | 1 | 2 | 3 | 4 | 5 | 6 | 7 | 8 | 9 | 10 | Pos. | Pts |
|---|---|---|---|---|---|---|---|---|---|---|---|---|---|---|---|
| 1967 | Gerhard Mitter | Brabham BT23 | Ford | SNE | SIL | NÜR; 8 | HOC | TUL | JAR | ZAN | PER | BRH | VAL | 15th | 2 |
| 1968 | Roy Winkelmann Racing | Brabham BT23C | Ford | HOC | THR | JAR | PAL | TUL | ZAN | PER | HOC; Ret | VAL | | NC | 0 |
| 1969 | BMW | BMW 269 | BMW | THR | HOC | NÜR; Ret | JAR | TUL | PER | VAL | | | | NC | 0 |

=== Complete 24 Hours of Le Mans results ===
| Year | Team | Co-Drivers | Car | Class | Laps | Pos. | Class Pos. |
|---|---|---|---|---|---|---|---|
| 1964 | (Germany) Porsche System Engineering | (United Kingdom) Colin Davis | Porsche 904/8 | P 3.0 | 244 | DNF | DNF |
| 1965 | (Germany) Porsche System Engineering | (United Kingdom) Colin Davis | Porsche 904/8 | P 2.0 | 20 | DNF | DNF |
| 1967 | (Germany) Porsche System Engineering | (Austria) Jochen Rindt | Porsche 907/6L | P 2.0 | 103 | DNF | DNF |
| 1968 | (Germany) Porsche System Engineering | (United Kingdom) Vic Elford | Porsche 908 | P 3.0 | 111 | DNF | DNF |
| 1969 | (Germany) Porsche System Engineering | (Germany) Udo Schütz | Porsche 908L | P 3.0 | 199 | DNF | DNF |

=== Complete 12 Hours of Sebring results ===
| Year | Team | Co-Drivers | Car | Class | Laps | Pos. | Class Pos. |
|---|---|---|---|---|---|---|---|
| 1965 | (Germany) Porsche Automobile Co. | (Germany) Herbert Linge | Porsche 904/8 | P 2.0 | 184 | 9th | 1st |
| 1966 | (Germany) Porsche System Engineering | (Germany) Hans Herrmann (United States) Joe Buzzetta | Porsche 906 | P 2.0 | 209 | 4th | 1st |
| 1966 | (Germany) Porsche System Engineering | (Germany) Günther Klass | Porsche 906 | P 2.0 | 120 | DNF | DNF |
| 1967 | (Germany) Porsche Auto | (United States) Scooter Patrick | Porsche 910 | P 2.0 | 226 | 3rd | 1st |
| 1968 | (Germany) Porsche Automobile Co. | (Germany) Rolf Stommelen | Porsche 907 2.2 | P 3.0 | 46 | DNF | DNF |
| 1969 | (Germany) Porsche System Engineering Ltd. | (Germany) Udo Schütz | Porsche 908/02 | P 3.0 | 232 | 5th | 4th |

| Preceded by Jo Schlesser | Formula One fatal accidents 1 August 1969 | Succeeded by Piers Courage |
