= Kurt Kuhnke =

German racing driver (1910–1969)

- Born: 30 April 1910; Stettin, Pomerania, Germany
- Died: 8 February 1969 (aged 58); Braunschweig, Lower Saxony, West Germany

Formula One World Championship career
- Nationality: (Germany) German
- Active years: 1963
- Team: non-works "BKL" Lotus
- Entries: 1 (0 starts)
- Championships: 0
- Wins: 0
- Podiums: 0
- Career points: 0
- Pole positions: 0
- Fastest laps: 0
- First entry: 1963 German Grand Prix

Kurt Kuhnke (30 April 1910 – 8 February 1969) was a racing driver from Germany, although he was more successful in motorcycle racing.

After racing motorcycles during the late 1940s, Kuhnke moved into car racing with a Formula Three Cooper 500 which he raced regularly through the 1950s with a number of wins, and other good finishes. He also competed in a few Formula Junior and Formula Two races before he finally moved into Formula One, failing to qualify Wolfgang Seidel's Lotus 18 at the non-Championship 1962 Pau Grand Prix before retiring the same car from the Solitude Grand Prix that year with engine failure. The first appearance of his Borgward-engined Lotus was delayed through problems preparing the engine, and Kuhnke missed four races he had entered in the second half of 1962. This engine was an old Sports Car unit, equipped with twin cams and direct fuel injection.

In 1963, Kuhnke failed to qualify his BKL Lotus at the Rome Grand Prix, along with team-mate Ernst Maring, and both cars suffered engine failures at the Solitude Grand Prix in July. His single World Championship Formula One entry was at the 1963 German Grand Prix where he failed to qualify by a considerable margin. The BKL Lotus was simply an ordinary Lotus, lightly modified by Kuhnke, the initials standing for Borgward Kuhnke Lotus.

After this, Kuhnke retired from the Kanonloppet at the Karlskoga Circuit in Sweden with fuel injection problems, before moving away from Formula One as a driver. He subsequently entered two BKL Lotus cars in the 1964 Solitude Grand Prix for Maring and German helicopter pilot Joachim Diel. Diel's car was one of seven eliminated in wet-weather accidents on the first lap, but Maring managed to finish tenth, and last, four laps down on the leader – the only occasion in which one of Kuhnke's cars finished a Formula One race.

== Complete Formula One World Championship results ==
(key)

Year	Entrant	Chassis	Engine	1	2	3	4	5	6	7	8	9	10	WDC	Points
1962	Kurt Kuhnke	Lotus 18	Borgward Straight-4	NED	MON	BEL	FRA	GBR	GER	ITA; DNA	USA	RSA		NC	0
1963	Kurt Kuhnke	BKL Lotus 18	Borgward Straight-4	MON	BEL	NED	FRA	GBR	GER; DNQ	ITA	USA	MEX	RSA	NC	0

=== Non-Championship ===
(key)

Year	Entrant	Chassis	Engine	1	2	3	4	5	6	7	8	9	10	11	12	13	14	15	16	17	18	19	20
1962	Autosport Team Wolfgang Seidel	Lotus 18	Climax Straight-4	CAP	BRX	LOM	LAV	GLV	PAU; DNQ	AIN	INT	NAP	MAL	CLP	RMS	SOL; Ret							
1962	Kurt Kuhnke	Lotus 18	Borgward Straight-4														KAN; DNA	MED; DNA	DAN; DNA	OUL	MEX	RAN	NAT
1963	Kurt Kuhnke	BKL Lotus 18	Borgward Straight-4	LOM	GLV	PAU	IMO	SYR	AIN	INT	ROM; DNQ	SOL; Ret	KAN; Ret	MED	AUT	OUL	RAN						
