= Trevor Taylor (racing driver) =

British racing driver (1936–2010)

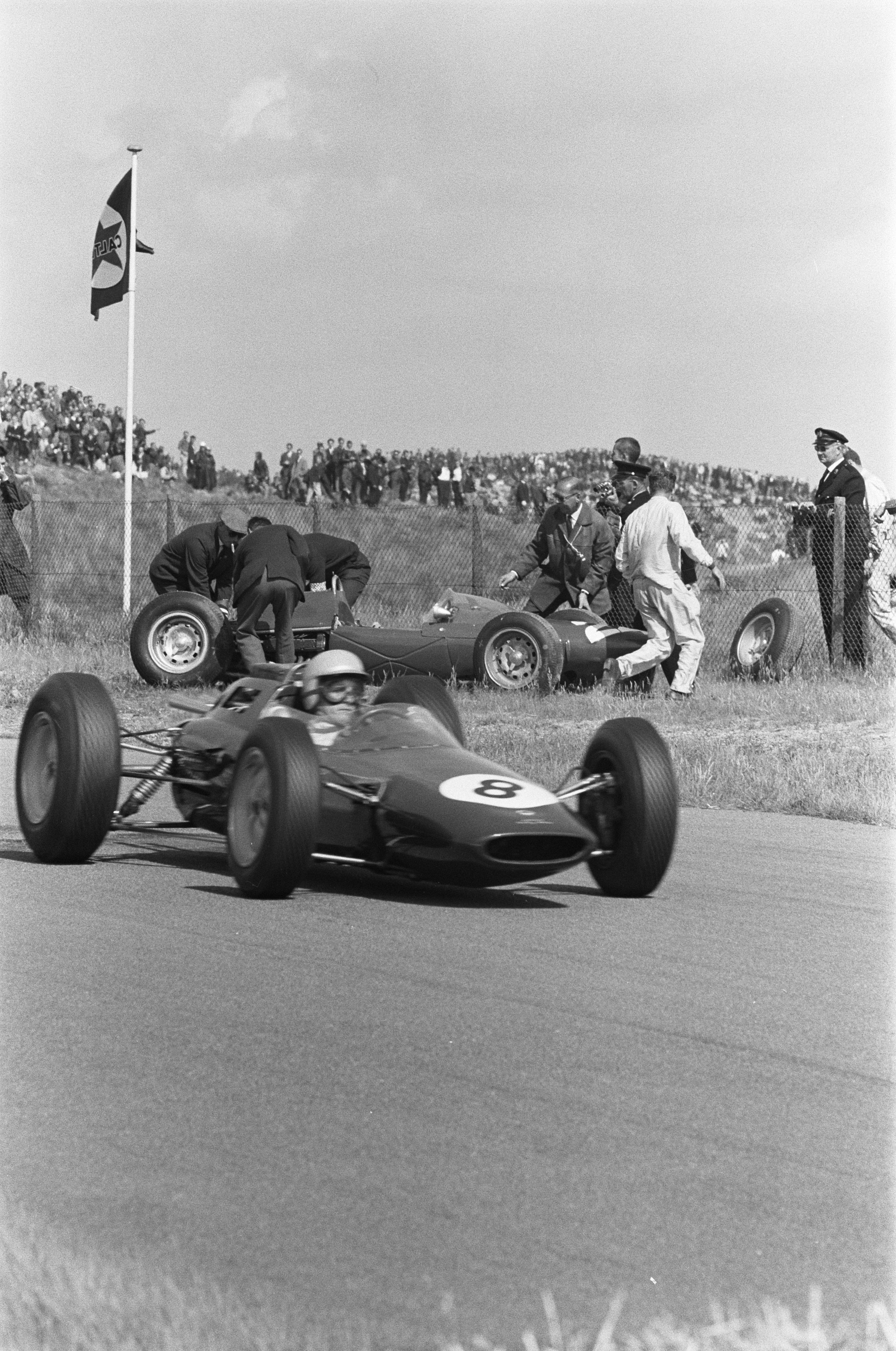
- Born: Trevor Patrick Taylor; 26 December 1936; Gleadless, Sheffield, England
- Died: 27 September 2010 (aged 73); Wickersley, Rotherham, England

Formula One World Championship career
- Nationality: (United Kingdom) British
- Active years: 1959, 1961–1964, 1966
- Team(s): Lotus (incl. non-works), BRP, Shannon, non-works Cooper
- Entries: 29 (27 starts)
- Championships: 0
- Wins: 0
- Podiums: 1
- Career points: 8
- Pole positions: 0
- Fastest laps: 0
- First entry: 1959 British Grand Prix
- Last entry: 1966 British Grand Prix

Trevor Patrick Taylor (26 December 1936 – 27 September 2010) was a British motor racing driver from England.

== Early career ==
Trevor Patrick Taylor was born in Sheffield, the son of a garage owner from Rotherham. He began his racing career in 500 cc (30.5 cu in) Formula Three racing, initially in a Staride and later a Cooper-Norton. Ten victories in 1958 earned him the British Formula Three Championship. After a frustrating year in 1959 spent with his own Formula Two Cooper, he received an invitation to run his Lotus 18 as a second works car for 1960. He finished equal first in the Formula Junior championship with Jim Clark, although he competed in two more races that counted towards the championship than Clark who was already driving regularly for Team Lotus in Formula One. Taylor went on to win the title on his own account in 1961. At the end of 1961, Taylor got a regular Formula One drive with Team Lotus and proved competitive with Clark and Moss in the South African series in December 1961.

== Formula One career ==
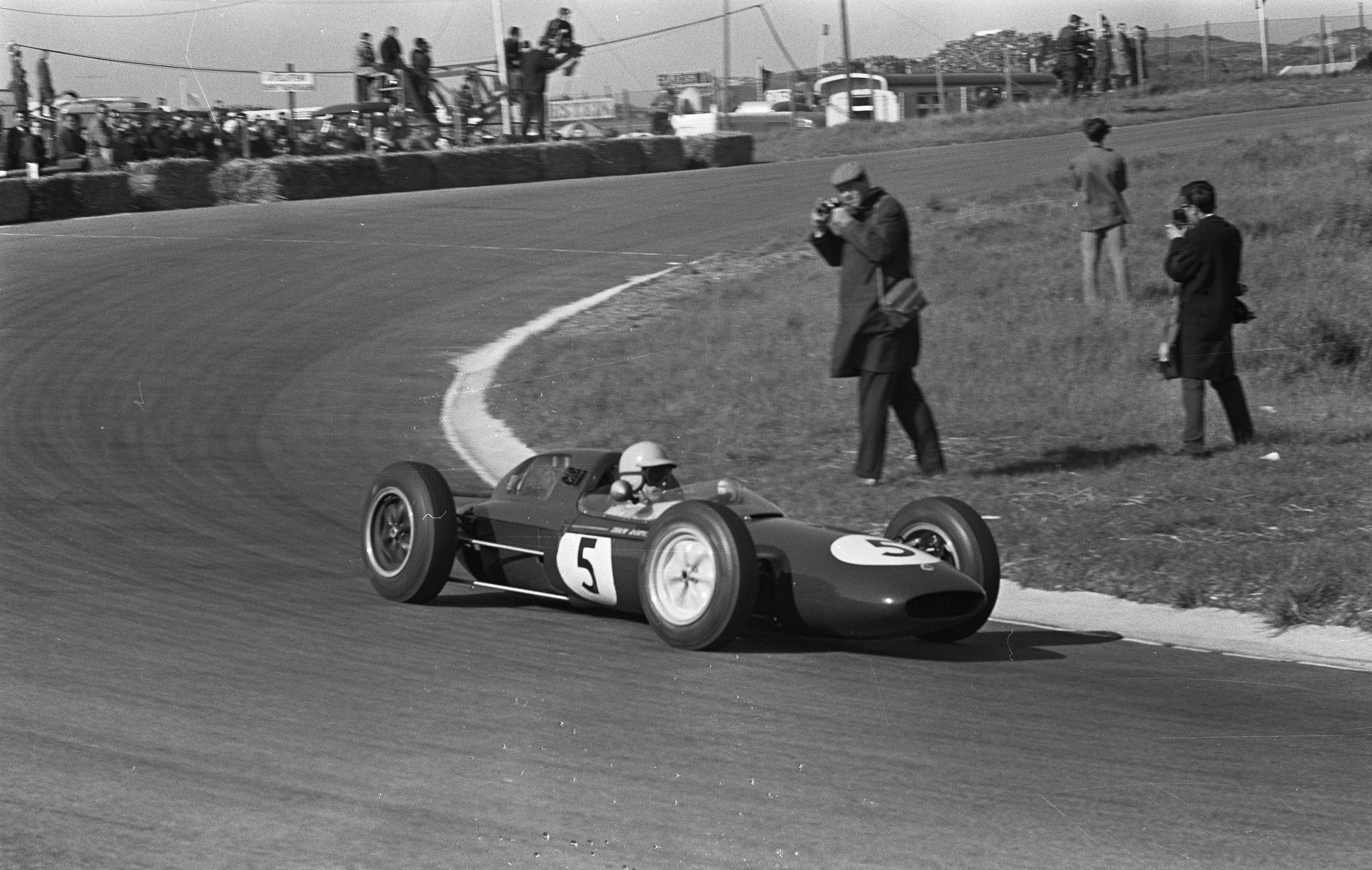
Taylor driving for Lotus at the 1962 Dutch Grand Prix.

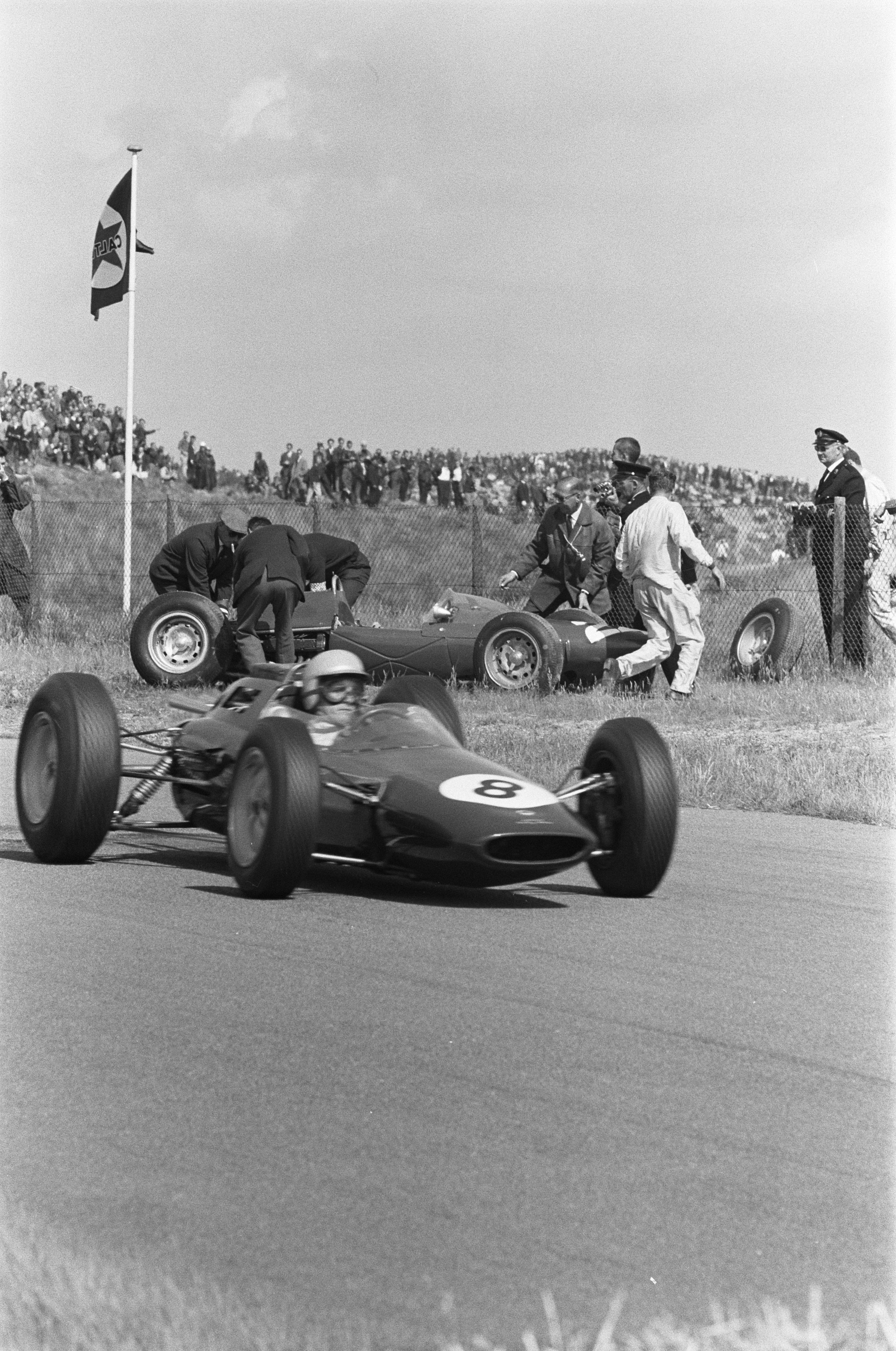
Taylor driving for Lotus at the 1963 Dutch Grand Prix.

Taylor participated in 29 World Championship Formula One Grands Prix, qualifying for 27 of them. He made his debut on 18 July 1959, in the British Grand Prix held that year at Aintree, driving a privately entered 1.5-litre Cooper T51 but did not qualify. In 1961, he was thirteenth at that year's Dutch Grand Prix, his only World Championship drive that year. He was second in the 1962 Formula One season opening Dutch Grand Prix, his only World Championship podium finish. He led early in the Belgian Grand Prix at Spa and after his team leader Clark passed he engaged in a duel with Willy Mairesse who was driving before his home crowd. Following in Taylor's slip steam, Mairesse clipped the extension of Taylor's gearbox going uphill from Stavelot, the Ferrari 156 having more power uphill, and while neither suffered serious injury both were lucky to survive the high speed encounter. Taylor said that, while Mairesse generally tried too hard and was over-eager for Championship honours, on this occasion, Mairesse was driving well and with precision and it was not his fault.

At the end of 1962, Taylor shared with Jim Clark the car and victory in the non-championship Mexican Grand Prix had a win and a second place at two non-championship events in South Africa confirming his place with Team Lotus in 1963. However, after a handful of top-three-finishes in non-championship events, his best World Championship result was sixth place in the opening race at Monaco, and thereafter he was rarely competitive, although on the fast Reims circuit, in the French Grand Prix, he was running second when he retired at two-thirds distance. Taylor admitted his confidence was shaken by two serious accidents at Spa and Enna-Pergusa. Team owner Colin Chapman suggested Taylor take a sabbatical after the end of the 1963 season and then return to Lotus. Taylor differed and attempted to continue as an F1 driver. After an unsuccessful season with the British Racing Partnership in 1964, Taylor withdrew from Formula One competition.

During his career, Taylor achieved one podium finish, and scored a total of eight championship points. He also participated in numerous non-Championship Formula One races during this time and won three, including one shared with Clark, in 1962 and 1963. Taylor is credited with inventing the yellow stripe that ran down the middle of Team Lotus cars during the 1960s.

After 1964, Taylor enjoyed lesser forms of racing, and tested a Cosworth Formula One car in 1969 which was entered for Grands Prix but did not race. In that, the opening year of F5000, Taylor was a strong contestant in the Guards Championship, winning F5000 rounds in a Surtees TS5 in the Netherlands, Denmark, Germany and Ireland and finished runner up to Peter Gethin in the 1969 F5000 series.

Taylor died at the age of 73 after contracting cancer.

== Complete Formula One World Championship results ==
(key)

Year	Entrant	Chassis	Engine	1	2	3	4	5	6	7	8	9	10	WDC	Points
1959	Ace Garage (Rotherham)	Cooper T51	Climax Straight-4	MON	500	NED	FRA	GBR; DNQ	GER	POR	ITA	USA		NC	0
1961	Team Lotus	Lotus 18	Climax Straight-4	MON	NED; 13	BEL	FRA	GBR	GER	ITA	USA			NC	0
1962	Team Lotus	Lotus 24	Climax V8	NED; 2	MON; Ret	BEL; Ret		GBR; 8	GER; Ret					10th	6
1962	Team Lotus	Lotus 25	Climax V8				FRA; 8			ITA; Ret	USA; 12	RSA; Ret		10th	6
1963	Team Lotus	Lotus 25	Climax V8	MON; 6	BEL; Ret	NED; 10	FRA; 13	GBR; Ret	GER; 8	ITA	USA; Ret	MEX; Ret	RSA; 8	17th	1
1964	British Racing Partnership	BRP 1	BRM V8	MON; Ret	NED					AUT; Ret	ITA; DNQ			22nd	1
1964	British Racing Partnership	BRP 2	BRM V8			BEL; 7	FRA; Ret					USA; 6	MEX; Ret	22nd	1
1964	British Racing Partnership	Lotus 24	BRM V8					GBR; Ret	GER					22nd	1
1966	Aiden Jones / Paul Emery	Shannon	Climax V8	MON	BEL	FRA	GBR; Ret	NED	GER	ITA	USA	MEX		NC	0

=== Non-championship results ===
(key) (Races in bold indicate pole position) (Races in italics indicate fastest lap)

Year	Entrant	Chassis	Engine	1	2	3	4	5	6	7	8	9	10	11	12	13	14	15	16	17	18	19	20	21
1959	Ace Garage (Rotherham)	Cooper T51 F2	Climax Straight-4	GLV	AIN; NC	INT	OUL	SIL; 9																
1961	Team Lotus	Lotus 18	Climax Straight-4	LOM	GLV	PAU; Ret	BRX; Ret	VIE	AIN; 19	SYR	NAP	LON	SIL; 9	SOL; 9	KAN	DAN	MOD	FLG	OUL; Ret	LEW	VAL			
1961	Team Lotus	Lotus 21	Climax Straight-4																			RAN; 2	NAT; Ret	RSA; Ret
1962	Team Lotus	Lotus 21	Climax Straight-4	CAP; 1	BRX; 10	LOM; Ret	LAV	GLV																
1962	Team Lotus	Lotus 24	Climax V8						PAU; 11	AIN; 5	INT; 10	NAP	MAL	CLP; Ret	RMS; Ret	SOL; 3	KAN	MED						
1962	Team Lotus	Lotus 25	Climax V8																DAN; 6	OUL; Ret	MEX; 1^{‡}	RAN; 2	NAT; 1	
1963	Team Lotus	Lotus 25	Climax V8	LOM; DNA	GLV	PAU; 2	IMO; 9	SYR; WD	AIN; 3	INT; 3	ROM	SOL; Ret	KAN; 2	MED; Ret	AUT	OUL; Ret	RAN; 10							
1964	British Racing Partnership	Lotus 24	BRM V8	DMT; Ret	NWT; 3	SYR																		
1964	British Racing Partnership	BRP 1	BRM V8				AIN; Ret	INT; Ret	SOL	MED; Ret	RAN													
1968	Ken Shepperd	McLaren M2B	Climax V8	ROC	INT; WD	OUL																		
1969	Team Surtees	Surtees TS5 F5000	Chevrolet V8	ROC	INT	MAD	OUL; 4																	
1970	Team Surtees	Surtees TS5 F5000	Chevrolet V8	ROC	INT; 12																			
1970	Doug Hardwick	Lola T190 F5000	Chevrolet V8			OUL; 5																		
1971	Malaya Garages	Leda LT25 F5000	Chevrolet V8	ARG	ROC	QUE	SPR	INT; Ret	RIN	OUL; Ret	VIC; Ret													
1972	Leda Engineering	Leda LT27 F5000	Chevrolet V8	ROC	BRA	INT; Ret	OUL	REP	VIC															

^{‡} Win shared with Jim Clark, who took over the car after being disqualified for a push start.
