= Solituderennen =

Coordinates: 48°46′4.81″N 9°2′49.86″E

The Solituderennen (eng: Solitude race) motorsport events are held on the 11.4 km Solitudering race track near Stuttgart. The event and the track were named after the nearby Castle Solitude. Motorsports events were held there from 1903 to 1965.

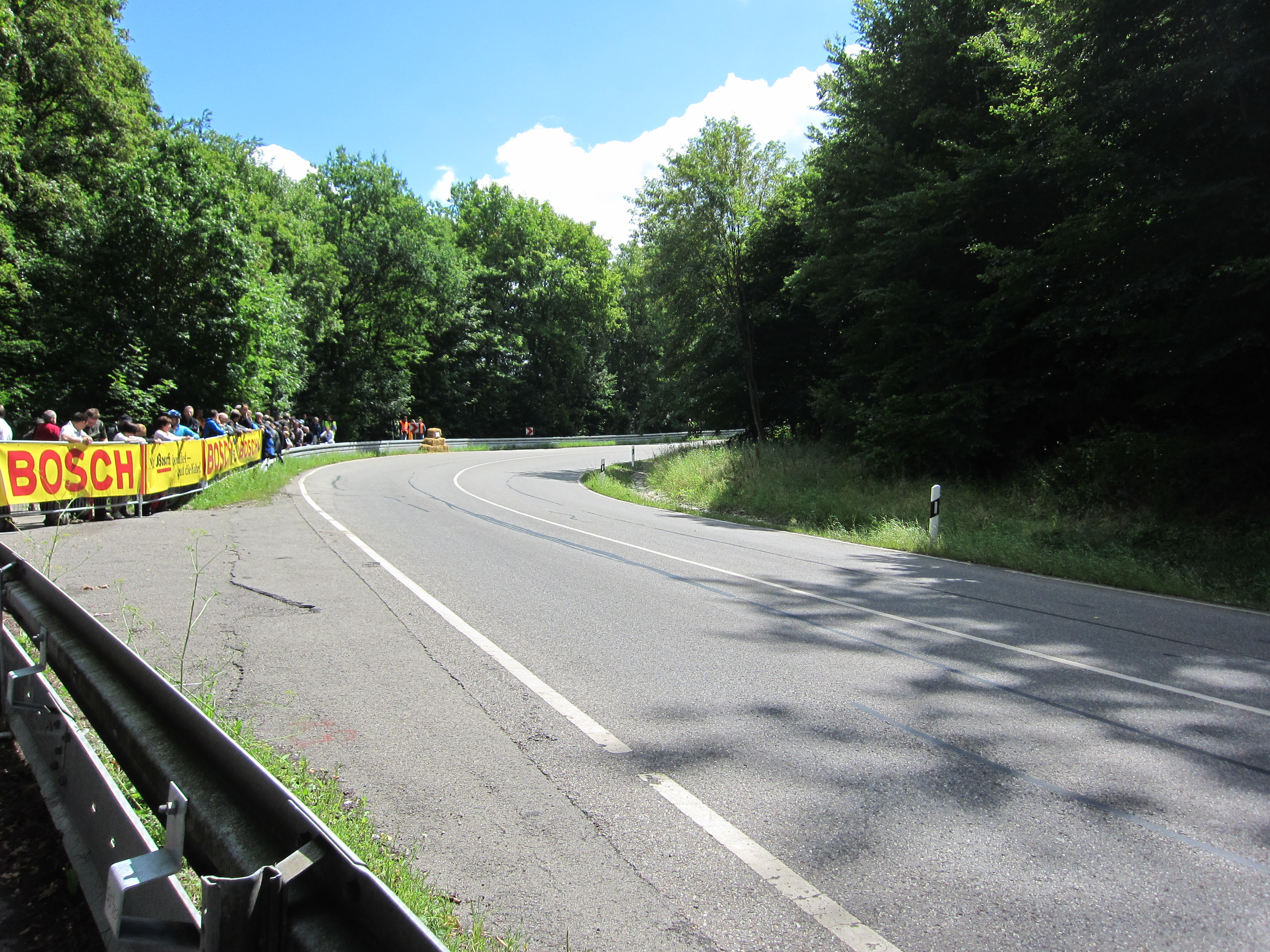
Solitude Hedersbachkurve

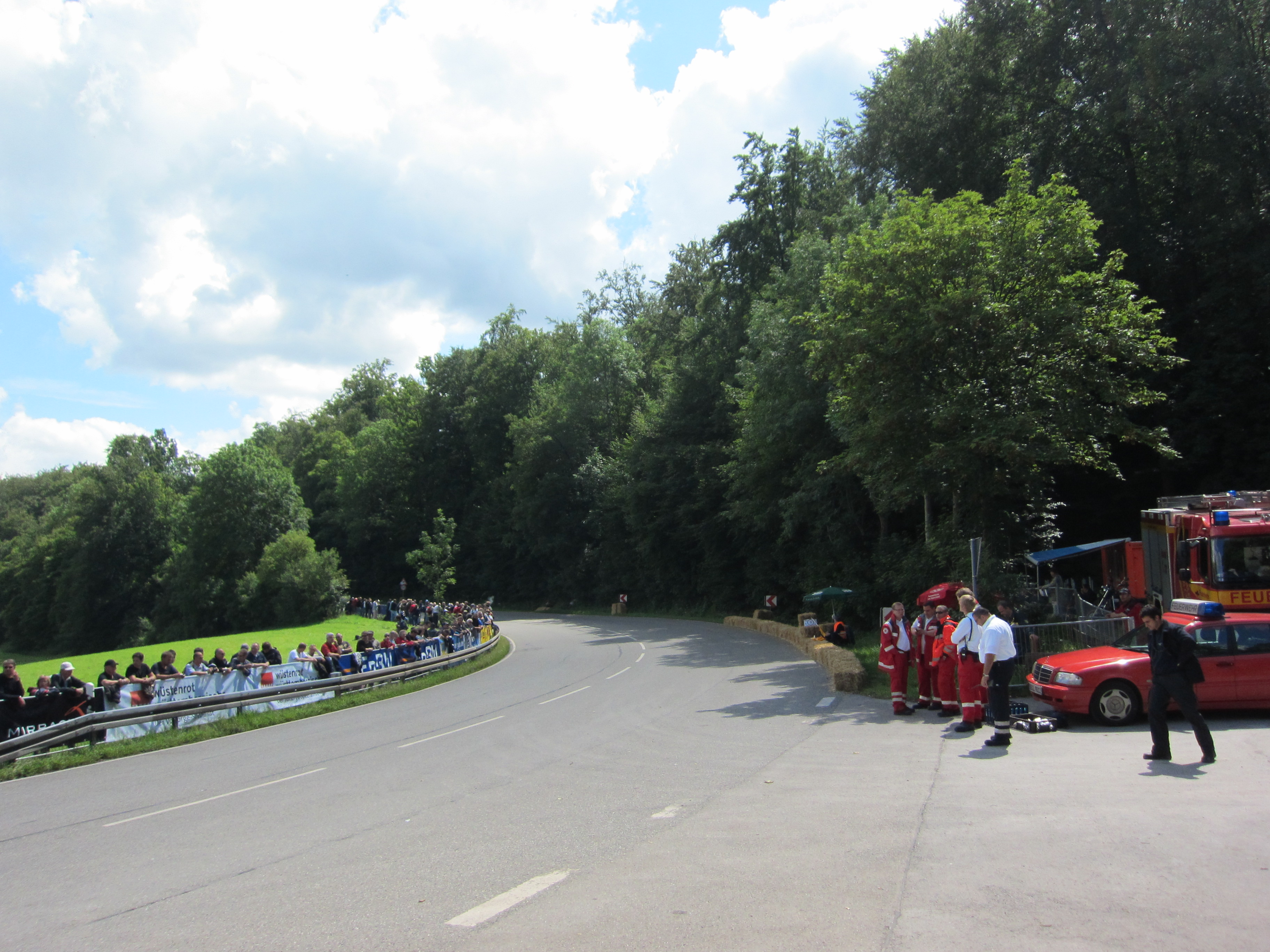
Solitude Glemseck

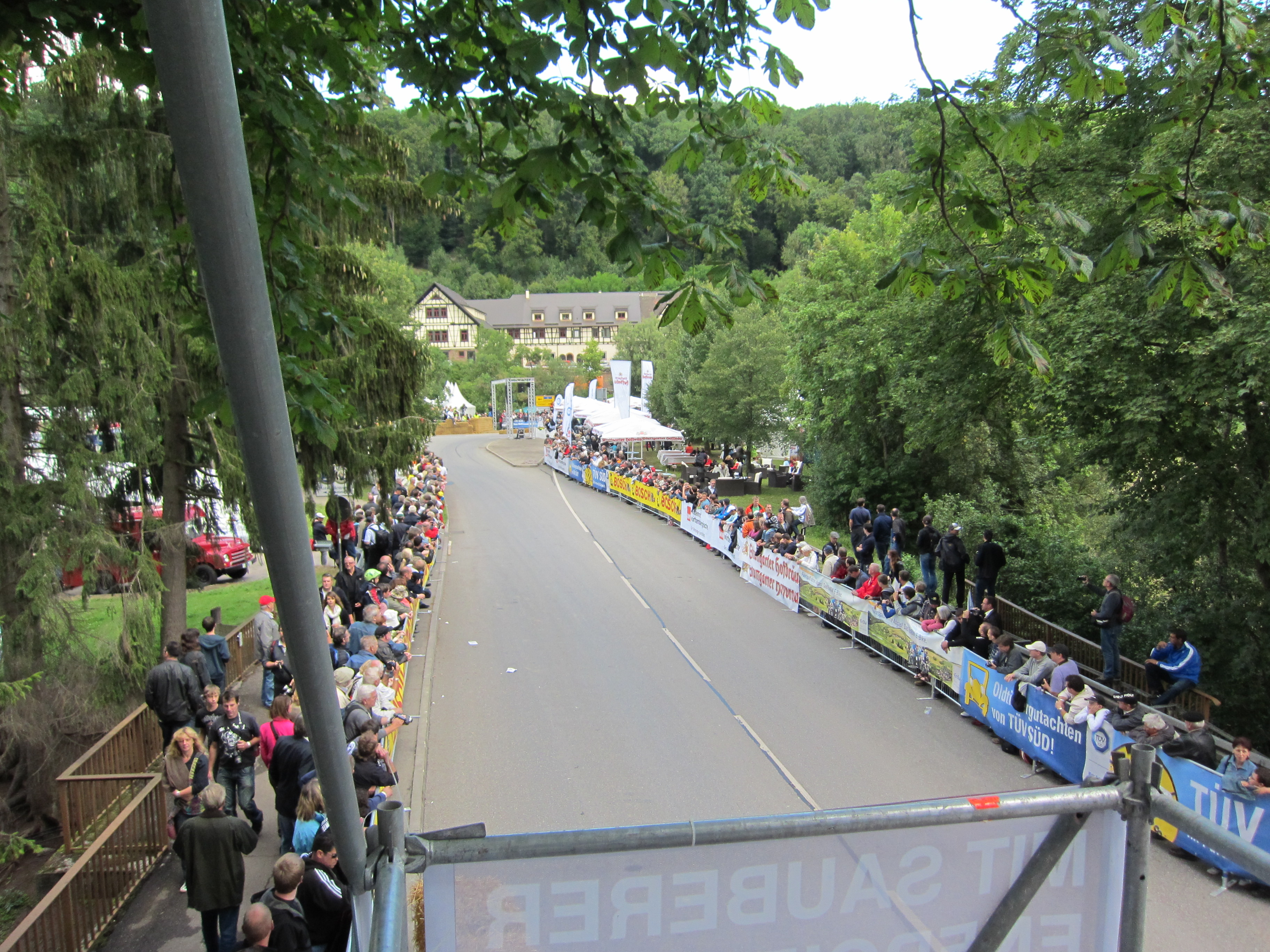
Solitude Seehaus

Due to the narrow track, initially mainly motorcycle events were held there until 1956. The track and the pits were widened in early 1957 and sports car racing was staged by the automobile club ADAC.

Grand Prix motorcycle racing events were held at the track from 1952 to 1964, with the German motorcycle Grand Prix taking place there in even-numbered years: 1952, 1954, 1956, 1958, 1960, 1962 and 1964.

From 1961 to 1964, non-Championship Formula One Grand Prix races were also held, in addition to previous Formula 2 and Formula Junior events.

In 2003, a memorial event was held, with many former participants and vehicles.

== Winners (incomplete) ==
=== Großer Preis der Solitude ===
Year	Driver	Constructor	Report
1960	(West Germany) Wolfgang von Trips	Ferrari	Report
1961	(United Kingdom) Innes Ireland	Lotus-Climax	Report
1962	(United States) Dan Gurney	Porsche	Report
1963	(Australia) Jack Brabham	Brabham-Climax	Report
1964	(United Kingdom) Jim Clark	Lotus-Climax	Report
1965	(New Zealand) Chris Amon	Lola-Ford	Report

=== Motorcycle ===
==== 50 ccm ====
1964: Ralph Bryans, Honda

==== 125 ccm ====
1964: Jim Redman, Honda

==== 250 ccm ====
- 1925: Josef Stelzer, BMW
- 1926: Josef Stelzer, BMW
- 1964: Phil Read, Yamaha (WC)

==== 350 ccm ====
- 1964:

==== 500 ccm ====
- 1925: Rudolf Reich, BMW
- 1964: Mike Hailwood, MV Agusta (WC)

==== 750 ccm ====
- 1926: Karl Raebel, BMW

==== 1,000 ccm ====
- 1926: Paul Köppen, BMW

==== Sidecar ====
1964: Scheidegger/Robinson, BMW
