= 1964 Solitude Grand Prix =

- Non-championship race in the 1964 Formula One season
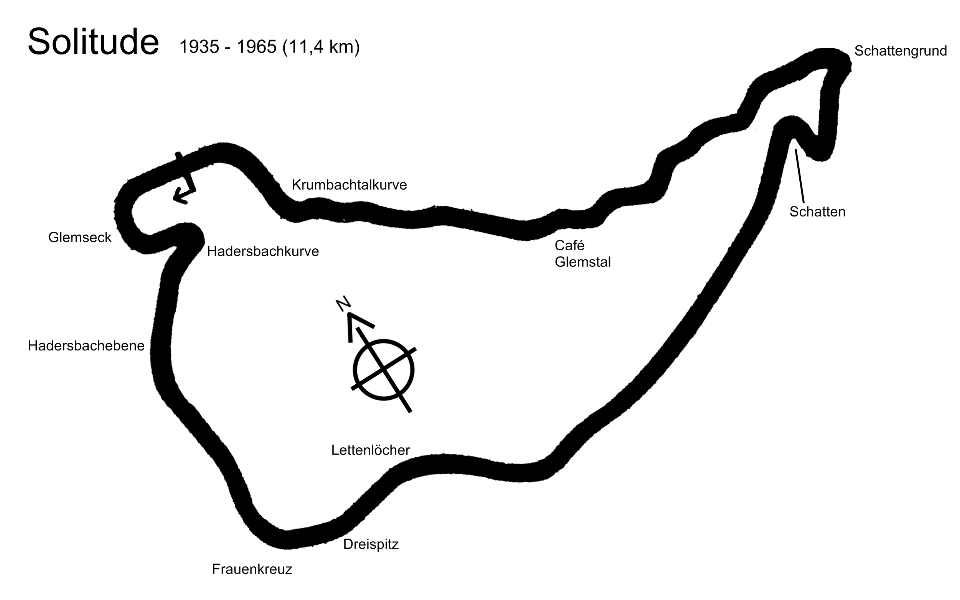

Race details
- Date: 19 July 1964
- Official name: XIV Großer Preis der Solitude
- Location: Solitudering, near Stuttgart
- Course: Permanent racing facility
- Course length: 11.4086 km (7.089 miles)
- Distance: 20 laps, 228.173 km (141.78 miles)

Pole position
Driver	(United Kingdom) Jim Clark	Lotus-Climax
- Time: 3:49.6

Fastest lap
Driver	(United Kingdom) Jim Clark	Lotus-Climax
- Time: 3:58.7

Podium
First	(United Kingdom) Jim Clark	Lotus-Climax
Second	(United Kingdom) John Surtees	Ferrari
Third	(United Kingdom) Bob Anderson	Brabham-Climax

The 14th Solitude Grand Prix was a non-Championship motor race, run to Formula One rules, held on 19 July 1964 at the Solitudering, near Stuttgart. The race was run over 20 laps of the circuit, and was won by Jim Clark in a Lotus 33, after a close battle with John Surtees in a Ferrari 158.

Seven drivers crashed out on the first lap due to heavy rain and standing water on the circuit.

== Results ==
Pos	Driver	Entrant	Constructor	Time/Retired	Grid
1	(United Kingdom) Jim Clark	Team Lotus	Lotus-Climax	1.33:02.2	1
2	(United Kingdom) John Surtees	SEFAC Ferrari	Ferrari	+ 10.4	2
3	(United Kingdom) Bob Anderson	DW Racing Enterprises	Brabham-Climax	19 laps	7
4	(United States) Peter Revson	Revson Racing (America)	Lotus-BRM	19 laps	15
5	(Sweden) Jo Bonnier	Rob Walker Racing Team	Brabham-BRM	19 laps	13
6	(United Kingdom) Trevor Taylor	British Racing Partnership	Lotus-BRM	18 laps	9
7	(Switzerland) Jo Siffert	Siffert Racing Team	Brabham-BRM	18 laps	10
8	(Netherlands) Carel Godin de Beaufort	Ecurie Maarsbergen	Porsche	18 laps	16
9	(United Kingdom) Mike Hailwood	Reg Parnell Racing	Lotus-BRM	16 laps	5
10	(West Germany) Ernst Maring	Kurt Kuhnke	BKL Lotus-Borgward	16 laps	18
Ret	(United Kingdom) Mike Spence	Team Lotus	Lotus-Climax	Steering - accident	6
Ret	(United Kingdom) Innes Ireland	British Racing Partnership	BRP-BRM	Accident	11
Ret	(United Kingdom) Graham Hill	Owen Racing Organisation	BRM	Accident	3
Ret	(West Germany) Joachim Diel	Kurt Kuhnke	BKL Lotus-Borgward	Accident	17
Ret	(West Germany) Gerhard Mitter	Team Lotus	Lotus-Climax	Accident	14
Ret	(New Zealand) Chris Amon	Reg Parnell Racing	Lotus-BRM	Accident	12
Ret	(Australia) Jack Brabham	Brabham Racing Organisation	Brabham-Climax	Accident	8
Ret	(Italy) Lorenzo Bandini	SEFAC Ferrari	Ferrari	Accident	4
WD	(United States) Dan Gurney	Brabham Racing Organisation	Brabham-Climax		-
WD	(United Kingdom) Richard Attwood	Owen Racing Organisation	BRM	Driver racing elsewhere	-

Previous race: 1964 BRDC International Trophy	Formula One non-championship races 1964 season	Next race: 1964 Mediterranean Grand Prix
Previous race: 1963 Solitude Grand Prix	Solitude Grand Prix	Next race: —
