= 1963 German Grand Prix =

6th round of the 1963 Formula One Championship

Race details
- Date: 4 August 1963
- Official name: XXV Grosser Preis von Deutschland
- Location: Nürburgring; Nürburg, West Germany
- Course: Permanent racing facility
- Course length: 22.810 km (14.173 miles)
- Distance: 15 laps, 342.150 km (212.602 miles)
- Weather: Warm, dry and sunny, 21C.

Pole position
Driver	(United Kingdom) Jim Clark	Lotus-Climax
- Time: 8:45.8

Fastest lap
Driver	(United Kingdom) John Surtees	Ferrari
- Time: 8:47.0 on lap 9

Podium
First	(United Kingdom) John Surtees	Ferrari
Second	(United Kingdom) Jim Clark	Lotus-Climax
Third	(United States) Richie Ginther	BRM

The 1963 German Grand Prix was a Formula One motor race held at Nürburgring on 4 August 1963. It was race 6 of 10 in both the 1963 World Championship of Drivers and the 1963 International Cup for Formula One Manufacturers. The 15-lap race was won by Ferrari driver John Surtees after he started from second position. Jim Clark finished second for the Lotus team and BRM driver Richie Ginther came in third.

== Race report ==
Jim Clark led away from pole in his customary fashion. Behind him Lorenzo Bandini spun in front of Innes Ireland who collected him, Willy Mairesse had an accident, and Chris Amon sustained a knee injury when the steering broke, catapulting him into the trees. Graham Hill retired leaving Clark to battle away with John Surtees and Trevor Taylor before engine problems befell Taylor. When Clark's engine went down to just 7 cylinders, Surtees was able to pass him easily to lead him home to take his first F1 victory. Richie Ginther completed the podium. Gerhard Mitter finished in a superb fourth place in his home race from Jim Hall and Jo Bonnier.

This race was notable for being the only time Jim Clark ever finished second in a World Championship race, as well the only race of the season won by a non-British team.

== Classification ==
=== Qualifying ===
Pos	No	Driver	Constructor	Qualifying times			Gap
Pos	No	Driver	Constructor	Q1	Q2	Q3	Gap
1	3	(United Kingdom) Jim Clark	Lotus-Climax	9:02.0	9:44.0	8:45.8	—
2	7	(United Kingdom) John Surtees	Ferrari	8:53.7	9:46.6	8:53.4	+7.6
3	15	(Italy) Lorenzo Bandini	BRM	8:59.3	10:28.0	8:54.3	+8.5
4	1	(United Kingdom) Graham Hill	BRM	9:11.8	10:13.8	8:57.2	+11.4
5	5	(New Zealand) Bruce McLaren	Cooper-Climax	10:01.5	10:09.9	8:57.3	+11.5
6	2	(United States) Richie Ginther	BRM	9:02.8	9:55.0	Unknown	+17.0
7	8	(Belgium) Willy Mairesse	Ferrari	9:05.5	10:41.2	9:03.5	+17.7
8	9	(Australia) Jack Brabham	Brabham-Climax	9:04.2	11:17.8	Unknown	+18.4
9	18	(Switzerland) Jo Siffert	Lotus-BRM	9:23.3	9:59.3	9:11.1	+25.3
10	6	(South Africa) Tony Maggs	Cooper-Climax	9:45.0	10:04.4	9:11.6	+25.8
11	14	(United Kingdom) Innes Ireland	Lotus-BRM	9:48.1	10:37.9	9:14.6	+28.8
12	16	(Sweden) Jo Bonnier	Cooper-Climax	9:24.3	9:58.6	9:16.0	+30.2
13	10	(United States) Dan Gurney	Brabham-Climax	9:38.2	10:41.4	9:17.2	+31.4
14	21	(New Zealand) Chris Amon	Lola-Climax	No time	No time	9:20.1	+34.3
15	26	(West Germany) Gerhard Mitter	Porsche	9:34.8	10:58.8	9:20.9	+35.1
16	20	(United States) Jim Hall	Lotus-BRM	9:50.1	11:19.0	9:22.7	+36.9
17	17	(Netherlands) Carel Godin de Beaufort	Porsche	9:34.9	10:21.5	9:25.1	+39.3
18	4	(United Kingdom) Trevor Taylor	Lotus-Climax	9:33.8	10:34.2	Unknown	+48.0
19	24	(United Kingdom) Ian Burgess	Scirocco-BRM	No time	No time	9:52.2	+1:06.4
20	22	(Portugal) Mário de Araújo Cabral	Cooper-Climax	14:20.3	No time	9:53.1	+1:07.3
21	28	(France) Bernard Collomb	Lotus-Climax	10:11.4	No time	10:01.0	+1:15.2
22	23	(United States) Tony Settember	Scirocco-BRM	No time	No time	10:02.0	+1:16.2
23	29	(Belgium) André Pilette	Lotus-Climax	11:16.9	11:20.1	10:20.0	+1:34.2
24	25	(United Kingdom) Ian Raby	Gilby-BRM	10:44.7	11:37.1	Unknown	+1:58.9
25	30	(United Kingdom) Tim Parnell	Lotus-Climax	11:07.2	12:02.2	No time	+2:21.4
26	27	(West Germany) Kurt Kuhnke	Lotus-Borgward	14:48.1	12:53.1	11:23.5	+2:37.7

=== Race ===
Pos	No	Driver	Constructor	Laps	Time/Retired	Grid	Points
1	7	(United Kingdom) John Surtees	Ferrari	15	2:13:06.8	2	9
2	3	(United Kingdom) Jim Clark	Lotus-Climax	15	+ 1:17.5	1	6
3	2	(United States) Richie Ginther	BRM	15	+ 2:44.9	6	4
4	26	(West Germany) Gerhard Mitter	Porsche	15	+ 8:11.5	15	3
5	20	(United States) Jim Hall	Lotus-BRM	14	+ 1 lap	16	2
6	16	(Sweden) Jo Bonnier	Cooper-Climax	14	+ 1 lap	12	1
7	9	(Australia) Jack Brabham	Brabham-Climax	14	+ 1 lap	8	
8	4	(United Kingdom) Trevor Taylor	Lotus-Climax	14	+ 1 lap	18	
9	18	(Switzerland) Jo Siffert	Lotus-BRM	10	Differential	9	
10	28	(France) Bernard Collomb	Lotus-Climax	10	+ 5 laps	21	
Ret	17	(Netherlands) Carel Godin de Beaufort	Porsche	9	Wheel	17	
Ret	6	(South Africa) Tony Maggs	Cooper-Climax	7	Engine	10	
Ret	10	(United States) Dan Gurney	Brabham-Climax	6	Gearbox	13	
Ret	22	(Portugal) Mário de Araújo Cabral	Cooper-Climax	6	Gearbox	20	
Ret	24	(United Kingdom) Ian Burgess	Scirocco-BRM	5	Steering	19	
Ret	23	(United States) Tony Settember	Scirocco-BRM	5	Accident	22	
Ret	5	(New Zealand) Bruce McLaren	Cooper-Climax	3	Accident	5	
Ret	1	(United Kingdom) Graham Hill	BRM	2	Gearbox	4	
Ret	21	(New Zealand) Chris Amon	Lola-Climax	1	Accident	14	
Ret	8	(Belgium) Willy Mairesse	Ferrari	1	Accident	7	
Ret	14	(United Kingdom) Innes Ireland	Lotus-BRM	1	Accident	11	
Ret	15	(Italy) Lorenzo Bandini	BRM	0	Accident	3	
DNQ	29	(Belgium) André Pilette	Lotus-Climax				
DNQ	25	(United Kingdom) Ian Raby	Gilby-BRM				
DNQ	30	(United Kingdom) Tim Parnell	Lotus-Climax				
DNQ	27	(West Germany) Kurt Kuhnke	Lotus-Borgward				
WD	11	(United States) Phil Hill	ATS		Car damaged in transit		
WD	12	(Italy) Giancarlo Baghetti	ATS		Car damaged in transit		
WD	19	(United States) Masten Gregory	Lotus-BRM		Car not ready		

== Notes ==
- This was the Formula One World Championship debut for German driver Kurt Kuhnke.
- This was the 100th race for a Ferrari-powered car.
- This race marked the 99th and 100th Formula One World Championship podium finish for a British driver.

== Championship standings after the race ==
Drivers' Championship standings

	Pos	Driver	Points
	1	(United Kingdom) Jim Clark	42
2	2	(United Kingdom) John Surtees	22
1	3	(United States) Richie Ginther	18
1	4	(United Kingdom) Graham Hill	13
	5	(United States) Dan Gurney	12

Constructors' Championship standings

	Pos	Constructor	Points
	1	(United Kingdom) Lotus-Climax	43
3	2	(Italy) Ferrari	22
1	3	(United Kingdom) BRM	22
1	4	(United Kingdom) Cooper-Climax	17
1	5	(United Kingdom) Brabham-Climax	13

- Notes: Only the top five positions are included for both sets of standings.

Previous race: 1963 British Grand Prix	FIA Formula One World Championship; 1963 season	Next race: 1963 Italian Grand Prix
Previous race: 1962 German Grand Prix	German Grand Prix	Next race: 1964 German Grand Prix
