= Gaetano Starrabba =

Italian racing driver (born 1932)

- Born: 3 December 1932 (age 93); Palermo, Italy

Formula One World Championship career
- Nationality: (Italy) Italian
- Active years: 1961
- Team: privateer Lotus
- Entries: 1
- Championships: 0
- Wins: 0
- Podiums: 0
- Career points: 0
- Pole positions: 0
- Fastest laps: 0
- First entry: 1961 Italian Grand Prix

Prince Gaetano Starrabba di Giardinelli (born 3 December 1932) is an Italian former racing driver. He participated in one Formula One World Championship Grand Prix, racing a Lotus-Maserati at the 1961 Italian Grand Prix on 10 September 1961. He scored no championship points. He also competed in several non-Championship Formula One races.

The title Prince di Giardinelli was his as a member of the Italian nobility.

== Complete Formula One World Championship results ==
(key)

| Year | Entrant | Chassis | Engine | 1 | 2 | 3 | 4 | 5 | 6 | 7 | 8 | WDC | Points |
|---|---|---|---|---|---|---|---|---|---|---|---|---|---|
| 1961 | Prince Gaetano Starrabba | Lotus 18 | Maserati Straight-4 | MON | NED | BEL | FRA | GBR | GER | ITA; Ret | USA | NC | 0 |
