= 1963 Solitude Grand Prix =

Non-championship Formula One race

- Non-championship race in the 1963 Formula One season
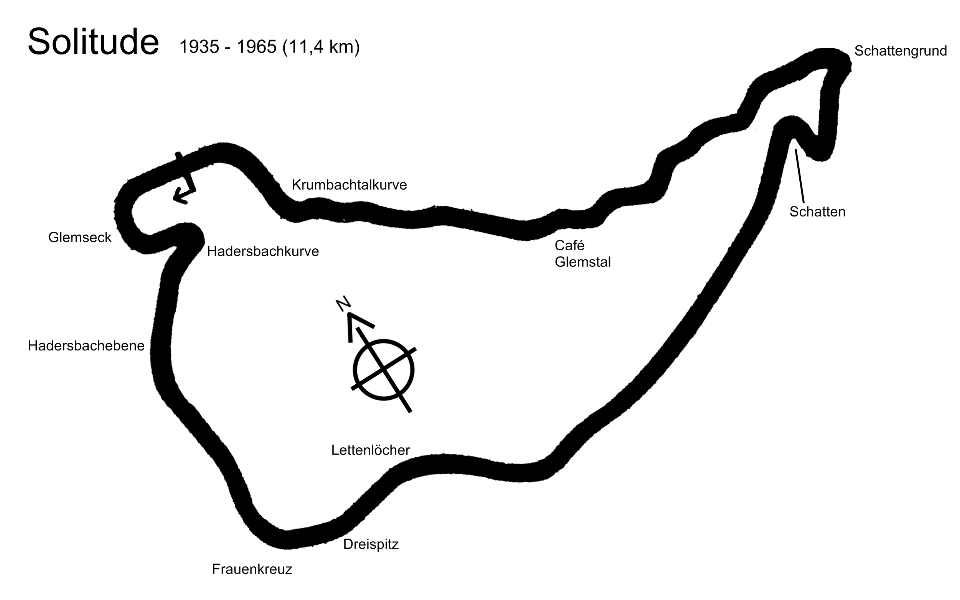

Race details
- Date: 28 July 1963
- Official name: XIII Großer Preis der Solitude
- Location: Solitudering, near Stuttgart
- Course: Permanent racing facility
- Course length: 11.4086 km (7.089 miles)
- Distance: 25 laps, 285.216 km (177.225 miles)

Pole position
Driver	(United Kingdom) Jim Clark	Lotus-Climax
- Time: 3:50.2

Fastest lap
Driver	(United Kingdom) Jim Clark	Lotus-Climax
- Time: 3:49.1

Podium
First	(Australia) Jack Brabham	Brabham-Climax
Second	(United Kingdom) Peter Arundell	Lotus-Climax
Third	(United Kingdom) Innes Ireland	BRP-BRM

The 13th Solitude Grand Prix was a non-Championship motor race, run to Formula One rules, held on 28 July 1963 at the Solitudering, near Stuttgart. The race was run over 25 laps of the circuit, and was won by Jack Brabham in a Brabham BT3.

== Results ==
Pos	Driver	Entrant	Constructor	Time/Retired	Grid
1	(Australia) Jack Brabham	Brabham Racing Organisation	Brabham-Climax	1.40.06.9	2
2	(United Kingdom) Peter Arundell	Team Lotus	Lotus-Climax	+ 24.7 s	4
3	(United Kingdom) Innes Ireland	British Racing Partnership	BRP-BRM	+ 2:30.5 s	6
4	(Italy) Lorenzo Bandini	Scuderia Centro Sud	BRM	+ 3:39.1 s	10
5	(West Germany) Gerhard Mitter	Ecurie Maarsbergen	Porsche	24 laps	11
6	(United States) Jim Hall	British Racing Partnership	Lotus-BRM	24 laps	9
7	(Netherlands) Carel Godin de Beaufort	Ecurie Maarsbergen	Porsche	24 laps	13
8	(United Kingdom) Bob Anderson	DW Racing Enterprises	Lola-Climax	24 laps	12
9	(Sweden) Jo Bonnier	Rob Walker Racing Team	Cooper-Climax	23 laps	3
10	(Portugal) Mário de Cabral	Scuderia Centro Sud	Cooper-Maserati	23 laps	18
11	(France) Bernard Collomb	Bernard Collomb	Lotus-Climax	22 laps	21
12	(Belgium) André Pilette	Tim Parnell	Lotus-Climax	21 laps	22
NC	(United Kingdom) Ian Raby	Ian Raby (Racing)	Gilby-BRM	20 laps	17
NC	(United Kingdom) Philip Robinson	Tim Parnell	Lotus-Climax	20 laps	19
NC	(United Kingdom) Mike Hailwood	Reg Parnell (Racing)	Lola-Climax	18 laps	14
NC	(West Germany) Günther Seiffert	Rhine-Ruhr Racing Team	Lotus-BRM	18 laps	20
NC	(United Kingdom) Jim Clark	Team Lotus	Lotus-Climax	17 laps	1
Ret	(Switzerland) Jo Siffert	Siffert Racing Team	Lotus-BRM	Valve	7
Ret	(West Germany) Ernst Maring	Kurt Kuhnke	BKL Lotus-Borgward	Engine	25
Ret	(United States) Tony Settember	Scirocco-Powell (Racing Cars)	Scirocco-BRM	Valve	15
Ret	(United Kingdom) Ian Burgess	Scirocco-Powell (Racing Cars)	Scirocco-BRM	Ignition	27
Ret	(United States) Phil Hill	Ecurie Filipinetti	Lotus-BRM	Fuel pipe	16
Ret	(New Zealand) Chris Amon	Reg Parnell (Racing)	Lola-Climax	Engine	8
Ret	(United Kingdom) Trevor Taylor	Team Lotus	Lotus-Climax	Crownwheel & pinion	5
Ret	(United Kingdom) Tim Parnell	Tim Parnell	Lotus-BRM	Engine	23
Ret	(United Kingdom) Ron Carter	Tim Parnell	Lotus-Climax	Engine	26
Ret	(West Germany) Kurt Kuhnke	Kurt Kuhnke	BKL Lotus-Borgward	Engine	24
WD	(Italy) Carlo Mario Abate	Scuderia Centro Sud	Cooper-Maserati		-
WD	(France) Jo Schlesser	Jo Schlesser	Brabham-Ford		-

Previous race: 1963 Rome Grand Prix	Formula One non-championship races 1963 season	Next race: 1963 Kanonloppet
Previous race: 1962 Solitude Grand Prix	Solitude Grand Prix	Next race: 1964 Solitude Grand Prix
