= 1963 Rome Grand Prix =

- Non-championship race in the 1963 Formula One season

Race details
- Date: 19 May 1963
- Official name: XV Gran Premio di Roma
- Location: ACI Vallelunga Circuit, Vallelunga
- Course: Permanent racing facility
- Course length: 3.222 km (2.002 miles)
- Distance: 2 x 40 laps, 255.96 km (159.04 miles)

Pole position
Driver	(Netherlands) Carel Godin de Beaufort	Porsche
- Time: 1:29.4

Fastest lap
Driver	(United Kingdom) Bob Anderson	Lola-Climax
- Time: 1:29.0

Podium
First	(United Kingdom) Bob Anderson	Lola-Climax
Second	(Netherlands) Carel Godin de Beaufort	Porsche
Third	(United Kingdom) Ian Raby	Gilby-BRM

The 15th Rome Grand Prix was a motor race, run to Formula One rules, held on 19 May 1963 at the ACI Vallelunga Circuit, near Rome in Italy. The race was run over two heats of 40 laps of the circuit, both of which were won by British driver Bob Anderson in a Lola Mk4.

Both heats finished with the same three cars coming home in the first three places, and each time they were the only three cars to complete the distance. The grid included some Italian drivers who were relatively unknown outside their home country, and who never took part in any World Championship Grands Prix. The only one of these to threaten the leaders in this race was Franco Bernabei in his De Tomaso, but his engine blew up while he was leading the first heat and he was unable to take part in the second.

Swiss driver Jo Siffert was to have taken part in this race, having decided against competing in a sports car race in Germany on the same day. The team he was to have driven for, Ecurie Filipinetti, lobbied the Swiss Automobile Club and they refused Siffert a visa to race in Rome.

== Results ==
Pos	Driver	Entrant	Constructor	Time/Retired	Grid	Heat 1 / 2
1	(United Kingdom) Bob Anderson	DW Racing Enterprises	Lola-Climax	2:02:32.2	2	1st / 1st
2	(Netherlands) Carel Godin de Beaufort	Ecurie Maarsbergen	Porsche	+ 32.7 s	1	2nd / 2nd
3	(United Kingdom) Ian Raby	Ian Raby (Racing)	Gilby-BRM	+ 1:05.4 s	5	3rd / 3rd
4	(Italy) Roberto Lippi	Scuderia Settecolli	De Tomaso-Maserati	78 laps	13	4th / 5th
5	(Italy) Gaetano Starrabba	Gaetano Starrabba	Lotus-Maserati	76 laps	10	5th / 6th
6	(France) Clement Barrau	Clement Barrau	Lotus-Climax	73 laps	17	7th / 7th
7	(Italy) Rovero Campello	Rovero Campello	De Tomaso-O.S.C.A.	71 laps	11	6th / 10th
8	(Italy) Gastone Zanarotti	Gastone Zanarotti	De Tomaso-Maserati	68 laps	19	9th / 8th
9	(United Kingdom) Tim Parnell	Tim Parnell	Lotus-Climax	68 laps (Engine)	6	Ret / 4th
10	(Germany) Günther Seiffert	Rhine-Ruhr Racing Team	Lotus-BRM	67 laps	18	8th / 11th
11	(United Kingdom) John Campbell-Jones	Tim Parnell	Lotus-BRM	56 laps	7	12th / 9th
Ret	(Italy) Massimo Natili	Scuderia Centro Sud	Cooper-Maserati	36 laps (Oil pipe / Gearbox)	4	Ret / Ret
Ret	(Argentina) Juan Manuel Bordeu	Count Volpi	Porsche	32 laps (Clutch)	8	10th / DNS
Ret	(Italy) Franco Bernabei	Alejandro de Tomaso	De Tomaso-Ford	27 laps (Engine)	3	Ret / DNS
Ret	(Italy) "Condor"	"Condor"	De Tomaso-Alfa Romeo	26 laps (Gearbox)	15	11th / Ret
Ret	(France) Bernard Collomb	Bernard Collomb	Lotus-Climax	20 laps	12	13th / DNS
Ret	(Switzerland) André Wicky	André Wicky	Cooper-Climax	7 laps (Oil pressure)	14	Ret / DNS
Ret	(Italy) Carlo Peroglio	Scuderia Centro Sud	Cooper-Maserati	3 laps (Oil pipe)	16	Ret / DNS
Ret	(Argentina) Nasif Estéfano	Alejandro de Tomaso	De Tomaso	1 lap (Clutch)	9	Ret / DNS
DNQ	(Germany) Kurt Kuhnke	Kurt Kuhnke	BKL Lotus-Borgward		-	-
DNQ	(Germany) Ernst Maring	Kurt Kuhnke	BKL Lotus-Borgward		-	-
DNP	(Switzerland) Jo Siffert	Siffert Racing Team	Lotus-BRM	Refused visa to race	-	-
WD	(Belgium) André Pilette	André Pilette	Lotus-Climax		-	-
WD	(United Kingdom) Philip Robinson	A. Robinson & Sons	Lotus-Climax		-	-

- Fastest lap: (Heat 1) Bob Anderson 1:30.9
- Fastest lap: (Heat 2) Bob Anderson 1:29.0

Previous race: 1963 BRDC International Trophy	Formula One non-championship races 1963 season	Next race: 1963 Solitude Grand Prix
Previous race: 1954 Rome Grand Prix	Rome Grand Prix	Next race: —
