= 1963 Kanonloppet =

- Non-championship race in the 1963 Formula One season

Race details
- Date: 11 August 1963
- Official name: IX Kanonloppet
- Location: Karlskoga Circuit, Karlskoga
- Course: Permanent racing facility
- Course length: 2.998 km (1.863 miles)
- Distance: 2 x 20 laps, 119.92 km (74.52 miles)

Pole position
Driver	(Australia) Jack Brabham	Brabham-Climax
- Time: 1.22.6

Fastest lap
Driver	(United Kingdom) Jim Clark	Lotus-Climax
- Time: 1:30.6

Podium
First	(United Kingdom) Jim Clark	Lotus-Climax
Second	(United Kingdom) Trevor Taylor	Lotus-Climax
Third	(Australia) Jack Brabham	Brabham-Climax

The 9th Kanonloppet was a motor race, run to Formula One rules, held on 11 August 1963 at the Karlskoga Circuit, Sweden. The race was run over two heats of 20 laps of the little circuit, and was won by British driver Jim Clark in a Lotus 25.

The first heat was won easily by Clark, with team-mate Trevor Taylor in a comfortable second place, from Jack Brabham in third. All the other runners were lapped at least once. Brabham had led for most of the race but suffered fuel shortage problems and his engine cut out. The second heat saw a reverse of the first, with Brabham winning from Taylor and Clark, with just a few tenths of a second separating the two Lotus drivers.

The only two retirements were the two BKL Lotus cars in the second heat. This race marked the Formula One debuts of the 1967 World Champion Denny Hulme, and British driver David Prophet.

== Results ==
Pos	Driver	Entrant	Constructor	Time/Retired	Grid	Heat 1 / 2
1	(United Kingdom) Jim Clark	Team Lotus	Lotus-Climax	1.04:26.7	2	1st / 3rd
2	(United Kingdom) Trevor Taylor	Team Lotus	Lotus-Climax	+ 35.0 s	3	2nd / 2nd
3	(Australia) Jack Brabham	Brabham Racing Organisation	Brabham-Climax	+ 45.5 s	1	3rd / 1st
4	(New Zealand) Denny Hulme	Brabham Racing Organisation	Brabham-Climax	39 laps	5	4th / 5th
5	(Sweden) Jo Bonnier	Rob Walker Racing Team	Cooper-Climax	39 laps	4	5th / 4th
6	(United States) Masten Gregory	Tim Parnell	Lotus-BRM	38 laps	7	7th / 6th
7	(Netherlands) Carel Godin de Beaufort	Ecurie Maarsbergen	Porsche	38 laps	8	6th / 7th
8	(United Kingdom) Bob Anderson	DW Racing Enterprises	Lola-Climax	38 laps	6	8th / 9th
9	(United Kingdom) Ian Raby	Ian Raby (Racing)	Gilby-BRM	37 laps	9	9th / 8th
10	(Belgium) André Pilette	Tim Parnell	Lotus-Climax	37 laps	12	11th / 10th
11	(United Kingdom) David Prophet	David Prophet	Brabham-Ford	37 laps	11	12th / 11th
12	(France) Clement Barrau	Clement Barrau	Lotus-Climax	34 laps	13	13th / 12th
Ret	(Germany) Ernst Maring	Kurt Kuhnke	BKL Lotus-Borgward	Accident	10	10th / Ret
Ret	(Germany) Kurt Kuhnke	Kurt Kuhnke	BKL Lotus-Borgward	Fuel injection	14	14th / Ret
DNP	(United Kingdom) Ron Carter	Tim Parnell	Lotus-Climax		-	-
WD	(United States) Dan Gurney	Brabham Racing Organisation	Brabham-Climax		-	-
WD	(New Zealand) Chris Amon	Reg Parnell (Racing)	Lola-Climax	Car not ready	-	-
WD	(United States) Tony Settember	Scirocco-Powell (Racing Cars)	Scirocco-BRM		-	-
WD	(United Kingdom) Ian Burgess	Scirocco-Powell (Racing Cars)	Scirocco-BRM		-	-

- Fastest lap: (Heat 1) Jim Clark 1:30.6
- Fastest lap: (Heat 2) Jack Brabham 1:36.1

Previous race: 1963 Solitude Grand Prix	Formula One non-championship races 1963 season	Next race: 1963 Mediterranean Grand Prix
Previous race: 1962 Kanonloppet	Kanonloppet	Next race: —
