= 1963 Lombank Trophy =

- Non-championship race in the 1963 Formula One season

Race details
- Date: 30 March 1963
- Official name: IV Lombank Trophy
- Location: Snetterton Motor Racing Circuit, Norfolk
- Course: Permanent racing facility
- Course length: 4.361 km (2.71 miles)
- Distance: 50 laps, 218.07 km (135.5 miles)
- Weather: Wet

Pole position
Driver	(United Kingdom) Jim Clark	Lotus-Climax
- Time: 1:44.4

Fastest lap
Driver	(United Kingdom) Graham Hill	BRM
- Time: 1:38.2

Podium
First	(United Kingdom) Graham Hill	BRM
Second	(United Kingdom) Jim Clark	Lotus-Climax
Third	(United Kingdom) Innes Ireland	Lotus-BRM

The 4th Lombank Trophy was a motor race, run to Formula One rules, held on 30 March 1963 at Snetterton Motor Racing Circuit, England. The race was run over 50 laps of the circuit, and was won by British driver Graham Hill in a BRM P57.

The lead changed hands several times between Richie Ginther and Jim Clark, before Hill, who had started from the back of the grid, passed Clark on lap 33. He stayed in front until the end of the race, with Clark second, while Ginther spun and finished fifth.

This was the first and only Formula One start for Adam Wyllie, who was killed at a Formula Three event at Dunboyne in 1965, when he was involved in an accident with Jack Pearce. Pearce had also entered this Lombank Trophy race but withdrew.

== Results ==
Pos	No.	Driver	Entrant	Constructor	Time/Retired	Grid
1	1	(United Kingdom) Graham Hill	Owen Racing Organisation	BRM	1:25:09.6	10
2	3	(United Kingdom) Jim Clark	Team Lotus	Lotus-Climax	+ 21.2 s	1
3	5	(United Kingdom) Innes Ireland	British Racing Partnership	Lotus-BRM	1:34.4 s	4
4	7	(New Zealand) Bruce McLaren	Cooper Car Company	Cooper-Climax	1:36.4 s	3
5	2	(United States) Richie Ginther	Owen Racing Organisation	BRM	49 laps	2
6	6	(United States) Jim Hall	British Racing Partnership	Lotus-BRM	47 laps	5
7	12	(United Kingdom) Adam Wyllie	Jock Russell	Lotus-Climax	44 laps	6
Ret	16	(United Kingdom) Bob Anderson	DW Racing Enterprises	Lola-Climax	Gearbox	9
Ret	14	(United Kingdom) Philip Robinson	A. Robinson & Sons	Lotus-Climax	Ignition	7
Ret	8	(United Kingdom) Tim Parnell	Reg Parnell	Lotus-BRM	Engine	8
DNS	17	(Switzerland) Jo Siffert	Scuderia Filipinetti	Lotus-BRM	Practice accident	-
WD	4	(United Kingdom) Trevor Taylor	Team Lotus	Lotus-Climax	No engine	-
WD	9	(United Kingdom) David Prophet	David Prophet	Brabham-Ford	Car not ready	-
WD	10	(United Kingdom) Morris Nunn	Morris Nunn	Cooper-Climax		-
WD	11	(United Kingdom) Graham Eden	Graham Eden	Cooper-Climax		-
WD	15	(United Kingdom) Jack Pearce	Auto Racing Services	Lotus-Climax		-
WD	18	(United Kingdom) Ron Carter	Tim Parnell	Lotus-Climax		-

Previous race: 1962 Natal Grand Prix	Formula One non-championship races 1963 season	Next race: 1963 Glover Trophy
Previous race: 1962 Lombank Trophy	Lombank Trophy	Next race: —
