= Tim Parnell =

British racing driver (1932–2017)

- Born: Reginald Harold Haslam Parnell Jr. 25 June 1932; Derby, Derbyshire, England, UK
- Died: 5 April 2017 (aged 84); Littleover, Derbyshire, England, UK

Formula One World Championship career
- Nationality: (United Kingdom) British
- Active years: 1959, 1961, 1963
- Team(s): privateer Cooper and Lotus
- Entries: 4 (2 starts)
- Championships: 0
- Wins: 0
- Podiums: 0
- Career points: 0
- Pole positions: 0
- Fastest laps: 0
- First entry: 1959 British Grand Prix
- Last entry: 1963 German Grand Prix

Reginald Harold Haslam "Tim" Parnell Jr. (25 June 1932 – 5 April 2017) was a British racing driver from England. He was the son of Reg Parnell, another racing driver.

Parnell participated in four Formula One World Championship Grands Prix, debuting on 18 July 1959, and qualified for two of them. He scored no championship points. His only finish was tenth place in the 1961 Italian Grand Prix at Monza.

After his father's death in 1964, Parnell took on the running of Reg Parnell Racing and on occasion managed his own team with entries for Mike Spence and Pedro Rodriguez. He went on to manage the BRM Formula One team from 1970–74.

Parnell died on 5 April 2017 at the age of 84.

== Complete Formula One World Championship results ==
(key)

Year	Entrant	Chassis	Engine	1	2	3	4	5	6	7	8	9	10	WDC	Points
1959	Reg Parnell Racing	Cooper T45 (F2)	Climax Straight-4	MON	500	NED	FRA	GBR; DNQ	GER	POR	ITA	USA		NC	0
1961	Tim Parnell	Lotus 18	Climax Straight-4	MON	NED	BEL	FRA	GBR; Ret	GER	ITA; 10	USA			NC	0
1963	Tim Parnell	Lotus 18/21	Climax Straight-4	MON	BEL	NED	FRA	GBR	GER; DNQ	ITA	USA	MEX	RSA	NC	0
