= Rob Slotemaker =

Dutch racing driver

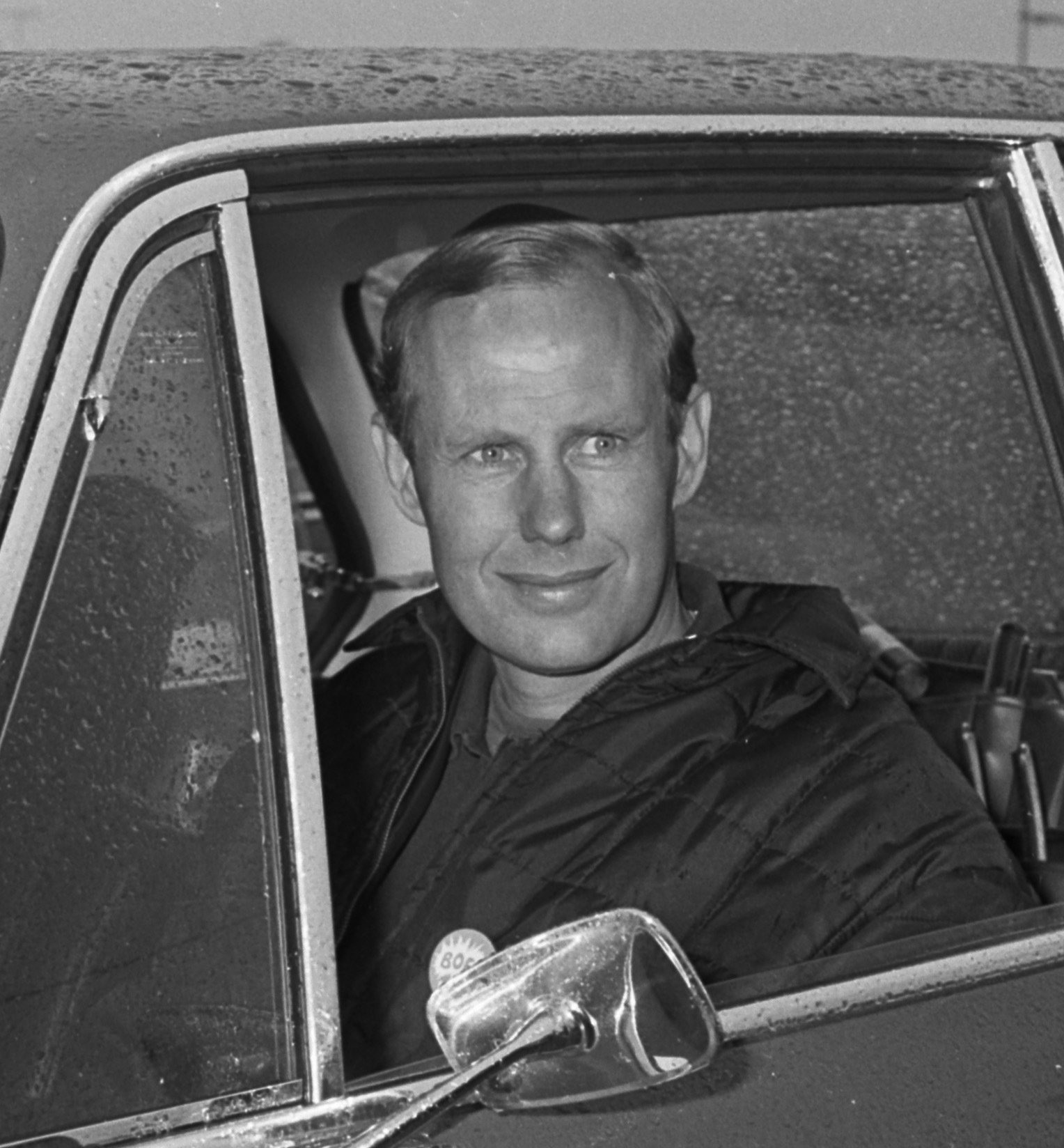
- Rob Slotemaker in 1968
- Born: Adriaan Robert Slotemaker; 13 June 1929; Batavia, Dutch East Indies
- Died: 16 September 1979 (aged 50); Zandvoort, Netherlands

Formula One World Championship career
- Nationality: (Netherlands) Dutch
- Active years: 1962
- Team: Ecurie Maarsbergen
- Entries: 1 (0 starts)
- Championships: 0
- Wins: 0
- Podiums: 0
- Career points: 0
- Pole positions: 0
- Fastest laps: 0
- First entry: 1962 Dutch Grand Prix

Adriaan Robert "Sloot" Slotemaker (13 June 1929 – 16 September 1979) was a Dutch racing driver.

Slotemaker entered one Formula One World Championship race, the 1962 Dutch Grand Prix, with one of Carel Godin de Beaufort's Porsches, but his car was not ready in time for the event. His entry was taken by Wolfgang Seidel. Throughout the 1960s, Slotemaker competed in the 24 Hours of Le Mans race, and was a driver and advisor for the Le Mans film in 1970.

In 1956, Slotemaker established his "Anti-skid" driving school at Zandvoort, which is still operating today.

On 16 September 1979, at the Circuit Park Zandvoort, Slotemaker was killed when he crashed his Chevrolet Camaro during the "Trophy of the Dunes" touring car race. His car spun on a patch of oil and collided with a course car parked alongside the track. Despite the relatively minor force of the accident, he suffered a broken neck and died instantly. A doctor in the course car was also injured.

A section of the circuit, the right-hander past Hunzerug, is named in his memory.

== Complete Formula One World Championship results ==
(key)

Year	Entrant	Chassis	Engine	1	2	3	4	5	6	7	8	9	WDC	Points
1962	Rob Slotemaker	Porsche 718	Porsche Flat-4	NED; DNP	MON	BEL	FRA	GBR	GER	ITA	USA	RSA	–	0
