= Porsche 787 =

- Constructor: Porsche
- Designer: Wilhelm Hild
- Production: 1960
- Predecessor: Porsche 718/2
- Successor: Porsche 804

Technical specifications
- Chassis: Space frame of mild steel tubing
- Suspension (front): Upper and lower A-arms with coil-over dampers
- Suspension (rear): Upper A-arm and reversed lower A-arm with radius rod, coil-over dampers
- Engine: Porsche 547/3 1,498 cc (91.4 cu in) F4 boxer mid-mounted
- Transmission: Porsche 718 6 speeds ZF limited-slip differential
- Weight: 450 kg (992.1 lb)
- Brakes: Drum brakes
- Tyres: Dunlop

Competition history
- Notable entrants: Porsche System Engineering; Porsche KG; Ecurie Maarsbergen
- Notable drivers: (Sweden) Joakim Bonnier; (United States) Dan Gurney
- Debut: 1961 Monaco Grand Prix
Races	Wins	Podiums	Poles
3	0	0	0
- Unless otherwise stated, all data refer to Formula One World Championship Grands Prix only.

The Porsche 787 is a Formula One (F1) racing car built and raced by Porsche for one year in 1961.

== History ==
In October 1958 the Fédération Internationale de l'Automobile (FIA) announced that for the 1961 Formula One season, engine capacity would be limited to the same 1.5 litres as in Formula Two (F2). This meant that Porsche could use their F2 cars almost unchanged in F1.

In 1959 Porsche unveiled the prototype of a narrow, open-wheel car called the Porsche 718/2 that married the 718 sport-racer's mechanicals with a more traditional single-seat Formula body. The unpainted car was entered in the 1959 Monaco Grand Prix, where driver Wolfgang von Trips qualified twelfth, but crashed on the second lap of the race. At Reims driver Joakim Bonnier finished third. For 1960 the production 718/2, starting with chassis number 718201, received revised bodywork, a 6-speed transaxle, and a wheelbase extended by 100 mm (3.9 in). A total of five cars were built. Some of these four-cylinder cars were later raced in F1 under the 1½ litre formula.

In 1961 Porsche launched the Type 787. Ferdinand Alexander "Butzi" Porsche, the founder's grandson, was involved in the design of what would become Porsche's first Formula One car. The car had a new chassis that was longer than that of the 718/2 by an additional 100 mm (3.9 in) to accommodate the Type 753 flat-eight engine that was then in development. The 787 would not get the eight-cylinder though, continuing with the air-cooled, DOHC four-cylinder Type 547 boxer engine that had been developed by Ernst Fuhrmann and that had powered the 550 Spyders and 718 series until then. While it kept the 718/2's rear suspension of an upper A-arm and lower reversed A-arm with a radius rod and helical coil spring over damper units, at the front a new upper and lower A-arm suspension with coil-over damper units replaced the previous trailing arm and torsion bar system. The first chassis was completed in April 1961, and appeared at the Monaco Grand Prix shortly after. It was powered by a 547/3 four-cylinder engine with Kugelfischer fuel injection. At Monaco the car retired when the fuel injection cut out. A second car, also fitted with the 547/3 engine, was completed in time to appear in the Dutch Grand Prix on 22 May alongside the other 787. The cars placed tenth and eleventh. A single 787 was driven to an eighth-place finish at the non-World-Championship 1961 Solitude Grand Prix. This car was driven by Edgar Barth, and was fitted with Porsche's annular disk brakes. A 787 sponsored by Ecurie Maarsbergen and driven by Ben Pon raced in the 1962 Dutch Grand Prix. Pon retired after spinning off the course on lap two.

Only two 787s, serial numbers 78701 and 78702, were ever built. Due to their lack of power and poor handling Ferry Porsche retired the model and continued with the 718/2 as a stopgap. Porsche would focus on the upcoming 804 and its flat-eight engine for Formula One in 1962. Both 787s were scrapped by the factory in 1964.

== Technical data ==
Porsche 787:	Detail
Engine:	Flat four-cylinder four-stroke boxer Type 547/3
Displacement:	1,498 cc (91.4 cu in)
Bore × Stroke:	85.0 mm × 66.0 mm (3.3 in × 2.6 in)
Maximum power:	139 kW (189.0 PS; 186.4 hp) at 8000 rpm
Maximum torque:	147 N⋅m (108.4 ft⋅lb) at 6500 rpm
Compression ratio:	10.3:1
Valvetrain:	One bevel-gear driveshaft and two overhead camshafts per cylinder bank (four in total). Two valves per cylinder.
Cooling:	Air-cooled (fan)
Transmission:	6-speed gearbox with limited-slip differential, rear-wheel drive
Brakes:	Drum
Suspension front:	Upper and lower A-arms with coil springs over tubular shock absorbers.
Suspension rear:	Upper A-arm, lower reversed A-arm and radius rods, coil springs over tubular shock absorbers.
Body/Chassis:	Space frame of mild steel tubing with aluminum bodywork
Track f/r:	1,300 / 1,330 mm (51.2 / 52.4 in)
Wheelbase:	2,300 mm (90.6 in)
Wheels and tires:	5.50–15 R on J × 15 front 6.00-15 R on J × 15 rear
Length × Width × Height:	3,600 mm × 1,520 mm × 900 mm (141.7 in × 59.8 in × 35.4 in)
Weight:	450 kg (992.1 lb)
Maximum speed:	250 km/h (155.3 mph)

== Complete Formula One World Championship results ==
(key) (results in bold indicate pole position)

Year	Entrant	Engine	Tyres	Drivers	1	2	3	4	5	6	7	8		Points	WCC
1961	Porsche System Engineering	Porsche 547/3 F4	**D**		MON	NED	BEL	FRA	GBR	GER	ITA	USA		22^{1}	3rd
1961	Porsche System Engineering	Porsche 547/3 F4	**D**	Joakim Bonnier	12	11								22^{1}	3rd
1961	Porsche System Engineering	Porsche 547/3 F4	**D**	Dan Gurney		10								22^{1}	3rd
1962	Ecurie Maarsbergen	Porsche 547/3 F4	**D**		NED	MON	BEL	FRA	GBR	GER	ITA	USA	RSA	18 (19)^{1}	5th
1962	Ecurie Maarsbergen	Porsche 547/3 F4	**D**	Ben Pon	Ret									18 (19)^{1}	5th

^1 All points were scored using the other Porsche models.
