= Ben Pon =

Dutch racing driver and vintner (1936–2019)

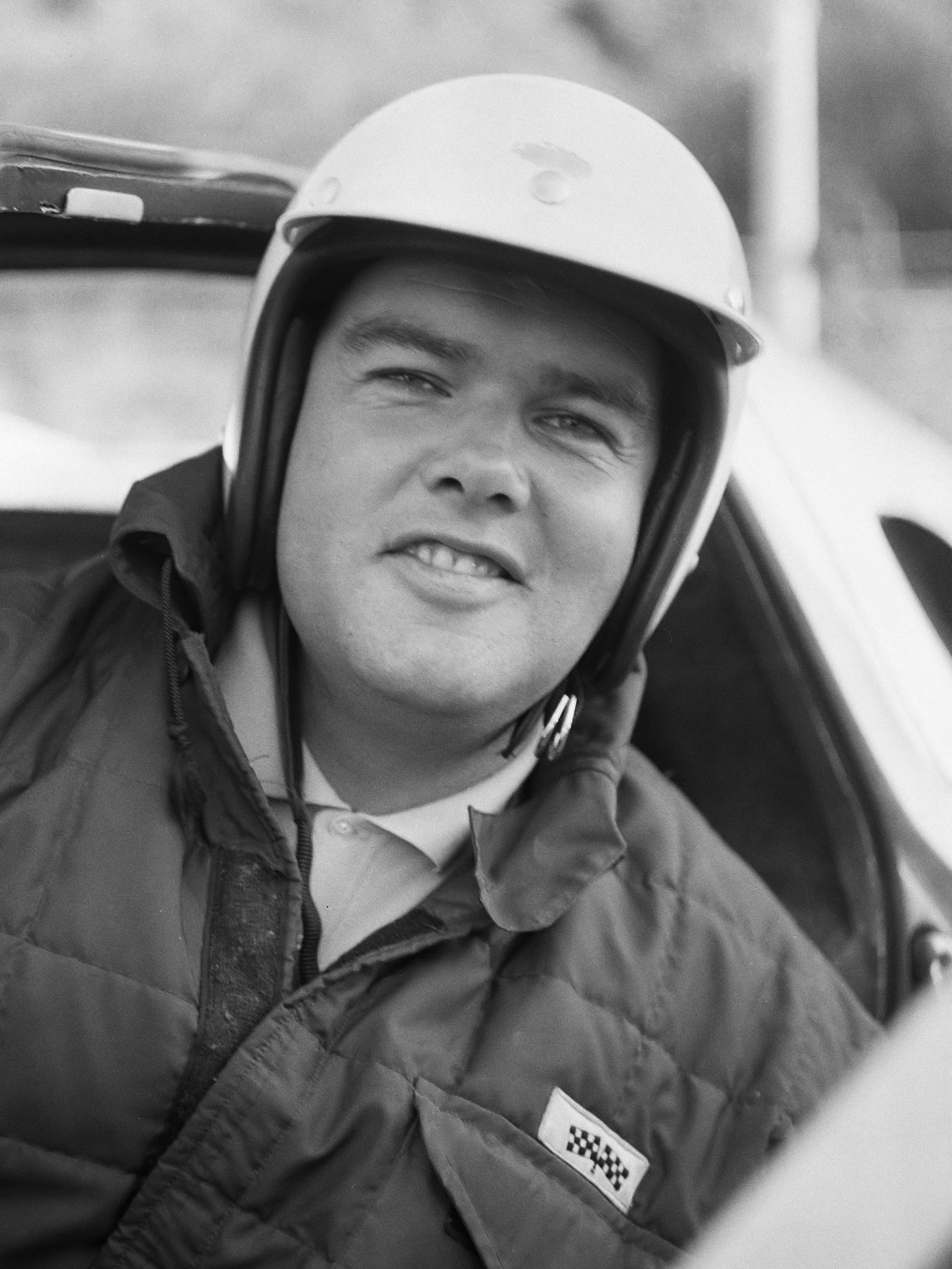
- Born: Bernardus Marinus Pon Jr. 9 December 1936; Leiden, Netherlands
- Died: 30 September 2019 (aged 82); Nijkerk, Netherlands

Formula One World Championship career
- Nationality: (Netherlands) Dutch
- Active years: 1962
- Team: Ecurie Maarsbergen (privateer Porsche)
- Entries: 1
- Championships: 0
- Wins: 0
- Podiums: 0
- Career points: 0
- Pole positions: 0
- Fastest laps: 0
- First entry: 1962 Dutch Grand Prix

24 Hours of Le Mans career
- Years: 1961 - 1965, 1967
- Teams: Porsche System Engineering, Racing Team Holland, Auguste Vaillet
- Best finish: 7th (1967)
- Class wins: 2 (1961, 1967)

Bernardus Marinus "Ben" Pon Jr. (9 December 1936 – 30 September 2019) was a Dutch vintner and Olympian and motor racing driver. He competed in one Formula One race, the 1962 Dutch Grand Prix, but had a far longer career in sports car racing, before turning his back on the track to concentrate on the wine trade. He also represented the Netherlands in clay pigeon shooting at the 1972 Summer Olympics, finishing 31st in the skeet event.

== Life ==
His father, Ben Pon Sr., was an importer of Volkswagen Beetles into the United States, and is considered to be the "father" of the Volkswagen Type 2 due to his initial interest and input into the project.

Pon was a personal friend of Formula One driver Carel Godin de Beaufort. It was de Beaufort's own Ecurie Maarsbergen privateer team that provided a Porsche 787 for him to race at Zandvoort, in his home Grand Prix on 20 May 1962. He failed to finish the race due to an accident, which flipped his car over, throwing Pon out of the cockpit and into a shrubbery. In response, Pon vowed never again to race single-seaters, and in the years that followed he remained true to his word, while achieving many successes in sports car racing also driving a Porsche. Pon retired from professional sports car racing in 1965, but came 7th in the 1967 24 Hours of Le Mans, co-driving with Vic Elford in a works Porsche 906.

After his retirement in the sports arena, Pon turned his attention to the wine trade. He was known for his Bernardus Winery in Carmel Valley, California, and owned the oldest wine negotiating business in the Netherlands.

== Racing record ==
=== Complete 24 Hours of Le Mans results ===
Year	Team	Co-Drivers	Car	Class	Laps	Pos.	Class Pos.
1961	(Germany) Porsche System Engineering	(Germany) Herbert Linge	Porsche 356B Abarth GTL	S 1.6	284	10th	1st
1962	(Germany) Porsche System Engineering	(Netherlands) Carel Godin de Beaufort	Porsche 356B Abarth	GT 1.6	35	DNF	DNF
1963	(Germany) Porsche System Engineering	(Switzerland) Heinz Schiller	Porsche 356B 2000GS GT	GT 2.0	115	DNF	DNF
1964	(Netherlands) Racing Team Holland	(Netherlands) Henk van Zalinge	Porsche 904/4 GTS	GT 2.0	319	8th	2nd
1965	(France) Auguste Veuillet	(France) Robert Buchet	Porsche 904/4 GTS	GT 2.0	224	DNF	DNF
1967	(Germany) Porsche System Engineering	(United Kingdom) Vic Elford	Porsche 906K Carrera 6	S 2.0	327	7th	1st

=== Complete Formula One World Championship results ===
(key)

Year	Entrant	Chassis	Engine	1	2	3	4	5	6	7	8	9	WDC	Pts
1962	Ecurie Maarsbergen	Porsche 787	Porsche 547/3 1.5 F4	NED; Ret	MON	BEL	FRA	GBR	GER	ITA	USA	RSA	NC	0
