= Ecurie Maarsbergen =

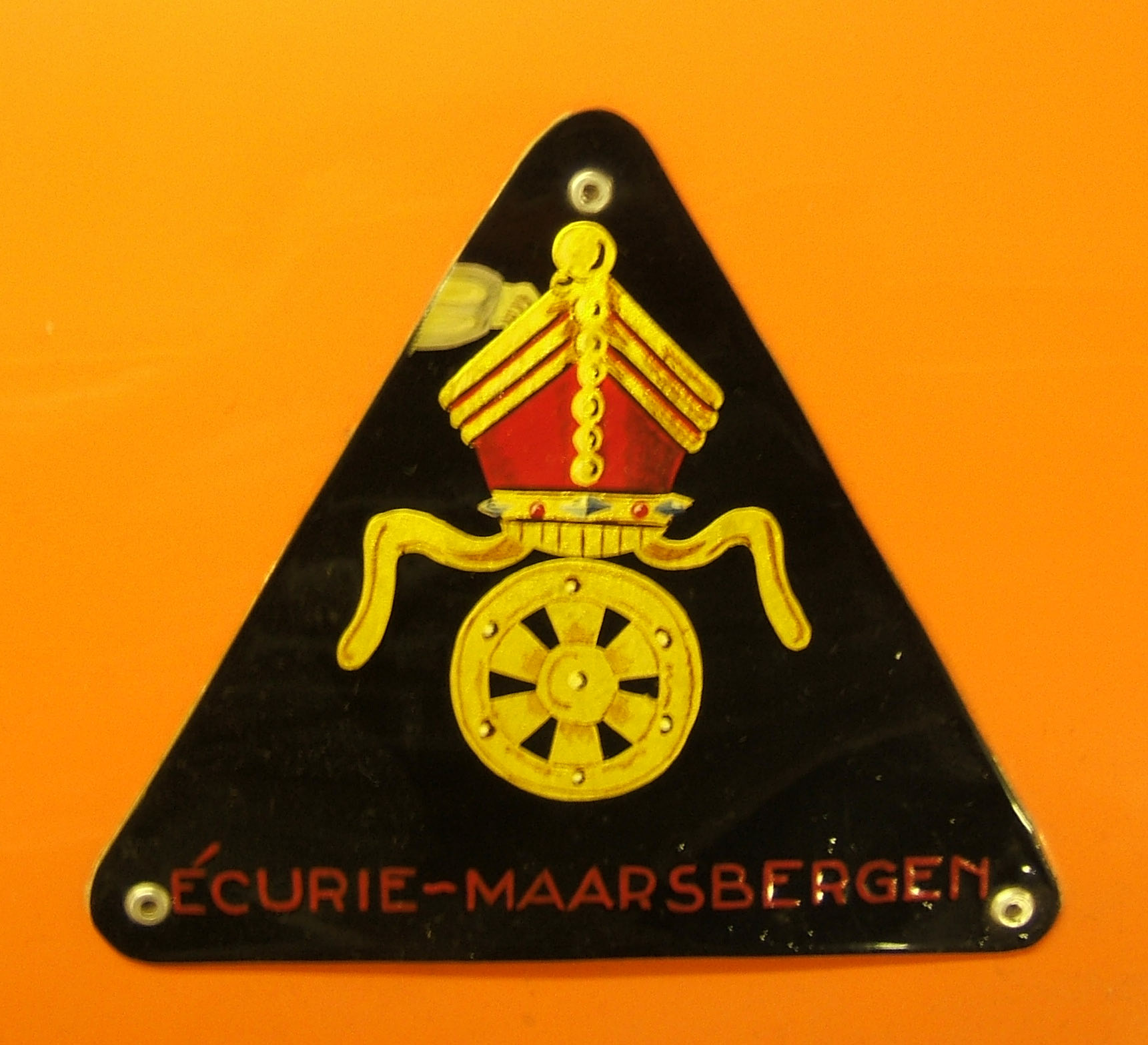
- Full name: Ecurie Maarsbergen
- Base: Netherlands
- Founder(s): Carel Godin de Beaufort
- Noted staff: Carel Godin de Beaufort
- Noted drivers: (Netherlands) Carel Godin de Beaufort (Germany) Gerhard Mitter

Formula One World Championship career
- First entry: 1957 German Grand Prix
- Races entered: 30
- Constructors: Porsche
- Drivers' Championships: 0
- Race victories: 0
- Points: 7
- Pole positions: 0
- Fastest laps: 0
- Final entry: 1964 German Grand Prix

Ecurie Maarsbergen (French for Stable Maarsbergen) was a name used by Dutch racing driver Carel Godin de Beaufort to enter his own cars in Formula One and sports car racing between 1957 and 1964.

Commonly the vehicles were entered for de Beaufort himself but, he also provided cars for a number of other drivers during the period.

== Complete Formula One World Championship results ==
(key)

Year	Chassis	Engine	Tyres	Driver/s	1	2	3	4	5	6	7	8	9	10	11
1957	Porsche RS550	Porsche 547/3 1.5 F4	D		ARG	MON	500	FRA	GBR	GER	PES	ITA			
1957	Porsche RS550	Porsche 547/3 1.5 F4	D	(Netherlands) Carel Godin de Beaufort						14^{‡}					
1958	Porsche RSK	Porsche 547/3 1.5 F4	D		ARG	MON	NED	500	BEL	FRA	GBR	GER	POR	ITA	MOR
1958	Porsche RSK	Porsche 547/3 1.5 F4	D	(Netherlands) Carel Godin de Beaufort			11								
1958	Porsche RS550	Porsche 547/3 1.5 F4	D	(Netherlands) Carel Godin de Beaufort								Ret^{‡}			
1959	Porsche RSK	Porsche 547/6 1.5 F4	D		MON	500	NED	FRA	GBR	GER	POR	ITA	USA		
1959	Porsche RSK	Porsche 547/6 1.5 F4	D	(Netherlands) Carel Godin de Beaufort			10								
1960	Cooper T51	Climax FPF 1.5 L4	D		ARG	MON	500	NED	BEL	FRA	GBR	POR	ITA	USA	
1960	Cooper T51	Climax FPF 1.5 L4	D	(Netherlands) Carel Godin de Beaufort				8							
1961	Porsche 718	Porsche 547/3 1.5 F4	D		MON	NED	BEL	FRA	GBR	GER	ITA	USA			
1961	Porsche 718	Porsche 547/3 1.5 F4	D	(Netherlands) Carel Godin de Beaufort		14	11	Ret	16	14	7				
1961	Porsche 718	Porsche 547/3 1.5 F4	D	(Germany) Hans Herrmann		15									
1962	Porsche 718	Porsche 547/6 1.5 F4	D		NED	MON	BEL	FRA	GBR	GER	ITA	USA	RSA		
1962	Porsche 718	Porsche 547/6 1.5 F4	D	(Netherlands) Carel Godin de Beaufort	6	DNQ	7	6	14	13	10	Ret	11		
1962	Porsche 787	Porsche 547/6 1.5 F4	D	(Netherlands) Ben Pon	Ret										
1962	Emeryson 61	Climax FPF 1.5 L4	D	(West Germany) Wolfgang Seidel	NC										
1963	Porsche 718	Porsche 547/6 1.5 F4	D		MON	BEL	NED	FRA	GBR	GER	ITA	USA	MEX	RSA	
1963	Porsche 718	Porsche 547/6 1.5 F4	D	(Netherlands) Carel Godin de Beaufort		6	9		10	Ret	DNQ	6	10	10	
1963	Porsche 718	Porsche 547/6 1.5 F4	D	(Germany) Gerhard Mitter			Ret			4					
1964	Porsche 718	Porsche 547/6 1.5 F4	D		MON	NED	BEL	FRA	GBR	GER	AUT	ITA	USA	MEX	
1964	Porsche 718	Porsche 547/6 1.5 F4	D	(Netherlands) Carel Godin de Beaufort		Ret				DNS					

^{‡} indicates a race entered with an F2 car.
