= 1967 24 Hours of Le Mans =

35th 24 Hours of Le Mans endurance race

Previous: 1966	Next: 1968
Index: Races | Winners

The 1967 24 Hours of Le Mans was the 35th Grand Prix of Endurance, and took place on 10 and 11 June 1967. It was also the seventh round of the 1967 World Sportscar Championship.

Dan Gurney and A. J. Foyt, driving a Ford Mk IV, won the race after leading from the second hour. As of 2026 this victory remains both the only all-American victory in Le Mans history — American drivers (Dan Gurney and A. J. Foyt), team (Shelby-American Inc.), chassis constructor (Ford), engine manufacturer (Ford), and tires (Goodyear) — as well as the only victory of a car designed and built entirely (both chassis and engine) in the United States.

Ferrari were second and third, and these top-three cars all broke the 5000 km mark in total distance covered for the first time. All overall records were broken – fastest, furthest, a new lap record, and biggest engine to win, along with a number of class records.

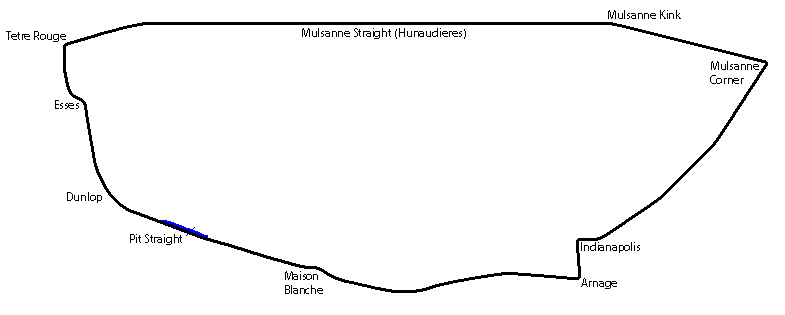
Le Mans in 1967

== Regulations ==
After the previous year's complete change in the CSI (Commission Sportive Internationale - the FIA’s regulatory body) – the FIA Appendix J – there were no significant changes or updates to the regulations.

In an effort to reduce the speed disparity between the classes, the Automobile Club de l'Ouest (ACO) lifted its minimum average speed for qualification, from 160 km/h (99 mph) to 190 km/h (120 mph). They also now required all cars to qualify to be within 85% of the pole-position car’s average speed. There was also about a 2.5% increase to the minimum distances on the Index of Performance.

== Entries ==
Once again there was a marked imbalance between the categories with only six Sports Cars and seven GTs versus the 41 Prototypes in the starting line-up. It brought together the best of the world’s racing drivers with 37 who had, or would, race in Formula 1. There were five World Champions and in the previous month, eleven drivers had raced in the Monaco Grand Prix and seven in the Indy 500.

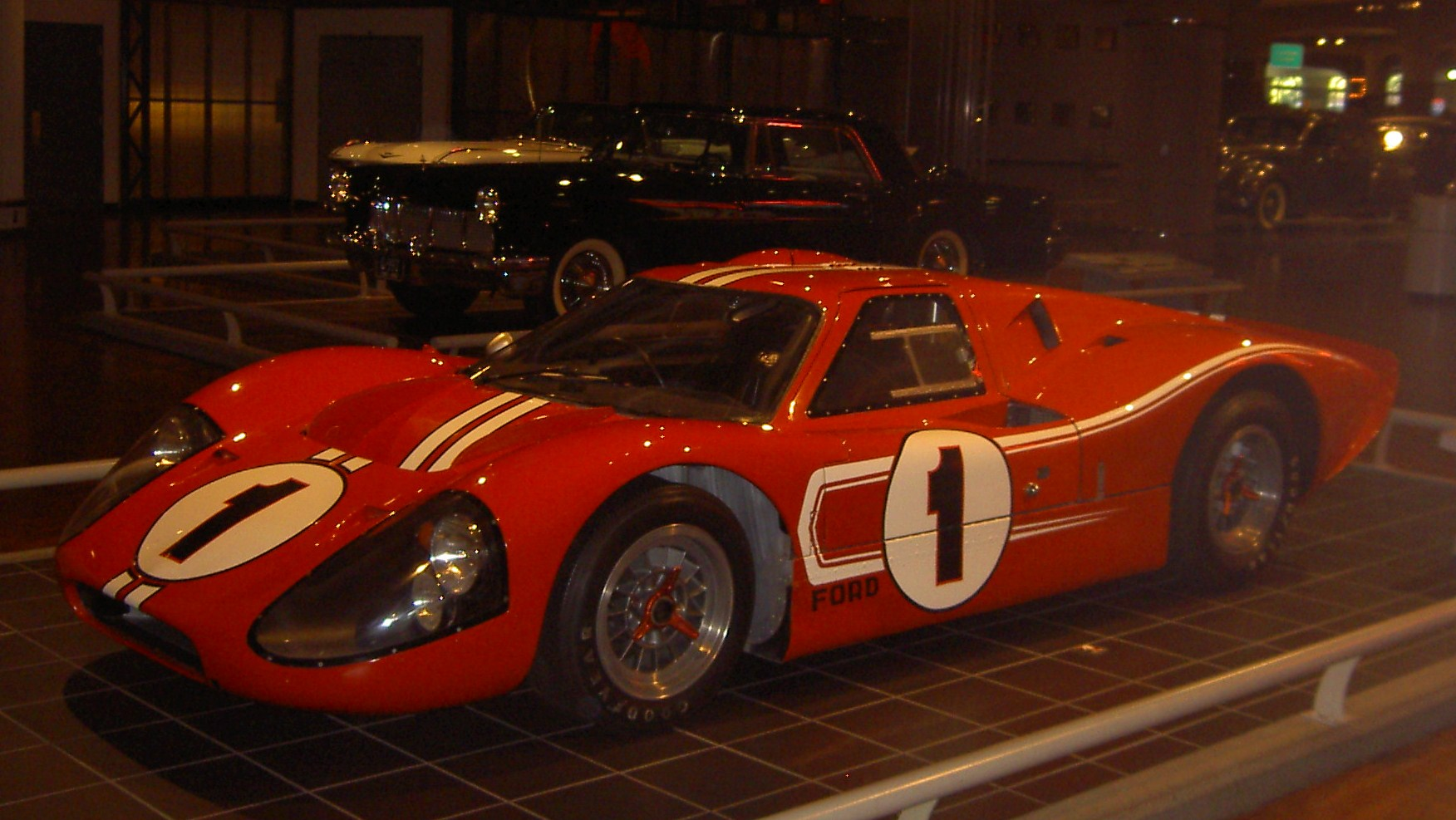
The winning Ford GT40 Mk IV of Gurney/Foyt

Defending champions Ford, along with Porsche, had the biggest representation with ten cars. The new Ford GT40 Mark IV was an updated version of the Ford J-Car, which was shelved following the fatal accident of Ken Miles in August 1966 (The Mk III being a small-production road-car). The Mark IV had an all new chassis designed and built in the United States. The big-block 427 cu in (7-litre) Ford Galaxie-derived engine from the Mk.II was now pushing out 530 bhp. Four cars were ready for Le Mans: two for Shelby American who had the American pair of Dan Gurney and A. J. Foyt in one car and defending champion Bruce McLaren with Mark Donohue in the other. The team had to fabricate a roof "bubble" to accommodate the helmet of Dan Gurney, who stood more than 190 cm (6 feet, 3 inches) tall. The other two went to Holman & Moody with its teams of Mario Andretti/Lucien Bianchi and Denny Hulme/Lloyd Ruby.

After a humiliating loss to the Ferrari works team at the opening round at Daytona (who finished 1-2-3, crossing the finish line there the same way Ford had at Le Mans the year before), Ford had won the next round at Sebring with Mario Andretti and Bruce McLaren driving the new Mk IV. For safety in numbers, Ford also entered three Mk IIB's (lightened versions of the previous year's car) run by Shelby American (Ronnie Bucknum/Paul Hawkins), Holman & Moody (Frank Gardner/Roger McCluskey) and Ford France (Jo Schlesser/Guy Ligier). Added to this were 3 GT40 Mk I entries for the S5.0 class: Ford France, John Wyer Automotive and Scuderia Filipinetti of Switzerland each entered 1. Although the Ford France, John Wyer and Scuderia Filipinetti entries were not official works entries like the Shelby-American and Holman & Moody teams were, they still received substantial factory support.

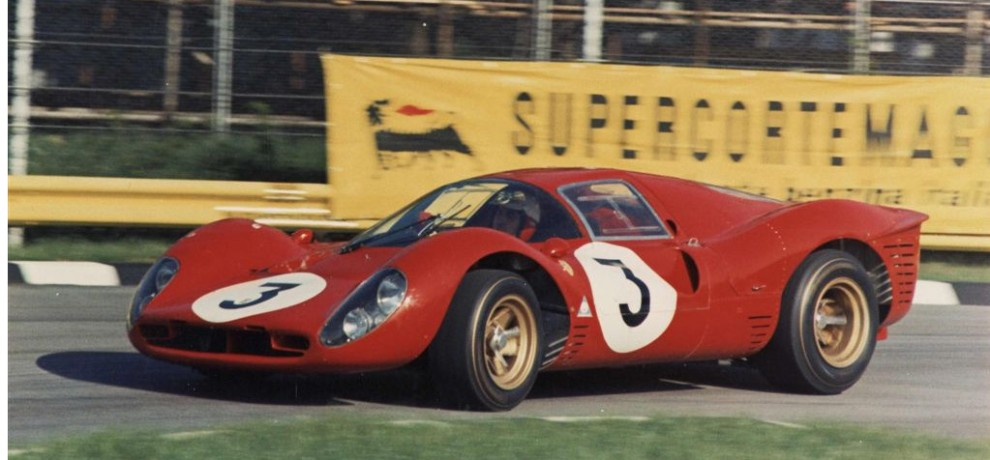
Ferrari 330 P4 at Monza in 1967, the same model used by Scuderia Ferrari at Le Mans

This year Ferrari chose to concentrate its efforts on the large-Prototype category. The latest evolution of the 250P, the 330 P4 had new bodywork, a better gearbox and the engine reworked, now putting out 450 bhp. Although lighter and with far better handling, it could not match the big Fords on sheer straight-line pace. Four were built and all were at Le Mans. The works team, now under Franco Lini, brought three of the cars. F1 team drivers Chris Amon and Lorenzo Bandini had won at the banked tracks at Daytona and Monza, but after Bandini was killed at Monaco, Amon drove with Nino Vaccarella in the open-top, spyder, version at Le Mans. Team regulars Ludovico Scarfiotti/Mike Parkes had the second and Klass/Sutcliffe the third. The other P4 was run by the Equipe Nationale Belge for Willy Mairesse/”Beurlys”.

There were also three updated P3's (now called the 412 P) for the other customer teams: Maranello Concessionaires (Richard Attwood/Piers Courage), Scuderia Filipinetti (Jean Guichet/Herbert Müller) and the North American Racing Team (NART) for Pedro Rodriguez/Giancarlo Baghetti. NART also ran their older modified-P2 again.

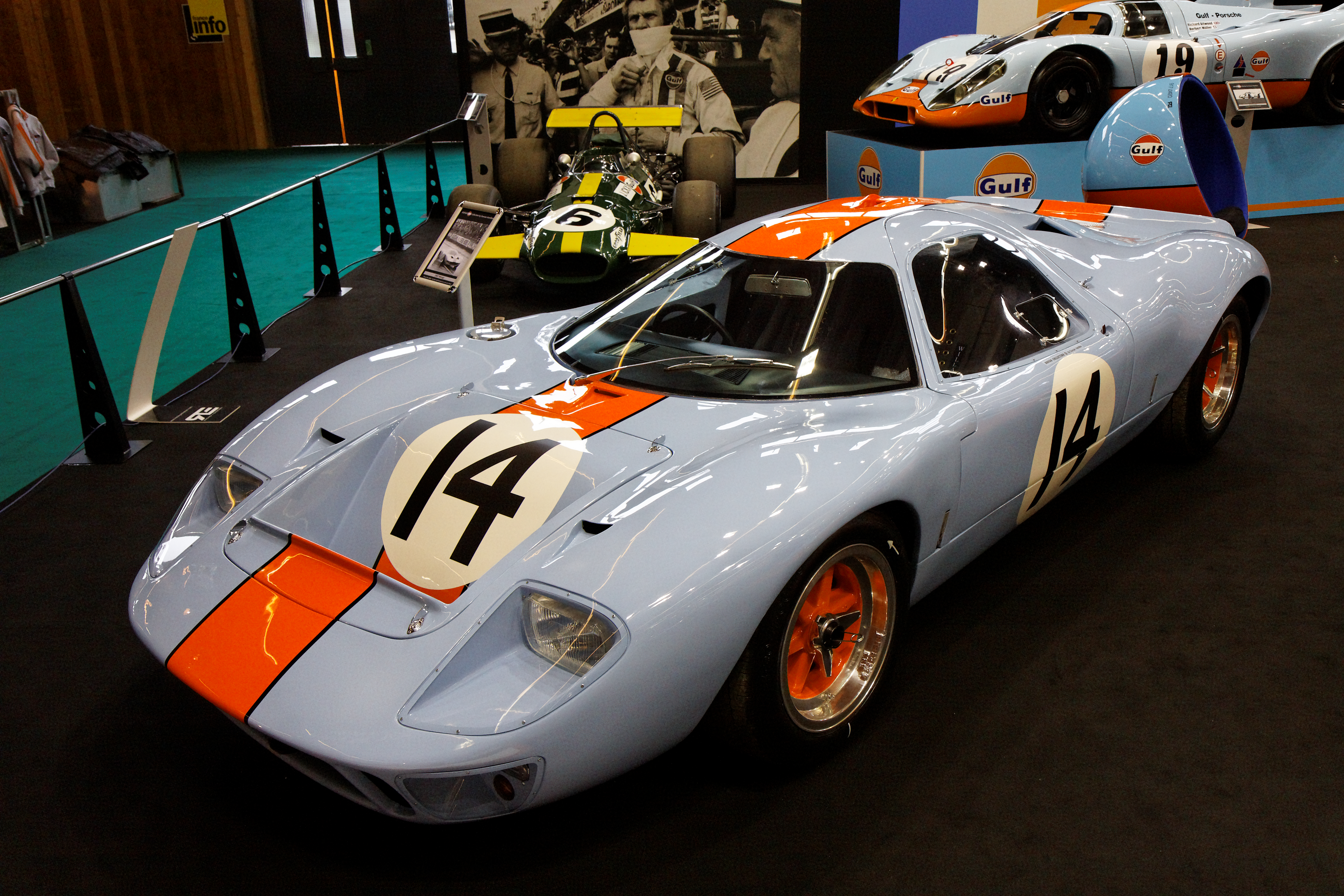
Spa-winning Mirage M1, this one driven by Piper and Thompson, which retired early due to engine issues

After the success in 1966, John Wyer and Ford had split amicably. J.W. Automotive had purchased the Ford Advanced Vehicles facility and set about adapting the GT40. With a new narrow-cockpit body design by Len Bailey, the Mirage M1 had new suspension and carried the 351 cu in (5.75L) Ford engine. After Jacky Ickx and Dick Thompson sensationally won the Spa 1000km race, two cars were entered for Le Mans. Ickx co-drove with Alan Rees and Thompson had David Piper.

Also rewarded for their work with the Ford GT project, Lola Cars returned to Le Mans with the new T70. John Surtees had won the inaugural Can Am series in North America with a Chevrolet V8 engine. The Mk3 GT version was taken to Le Mans, now powered by an Aston Martin engine developing 450 bhp. Surtees had David Hobbs as co-driver, with a second car for Chris Irwin/Peter de Klerk

The most striking cars this year were the two Chaparrals. The new model 2F had a high-mounted adjustable wing pushing down on the rear wheels. It was now fitted with a Chevrolet big-block 427 cu in (7-litre) that produced over 550 bhp through a three-speed automatic transmission. Previous race-winner Phil Hill raced with Mike Spence with Bruce Jennings/Bob Johnson in the second car.

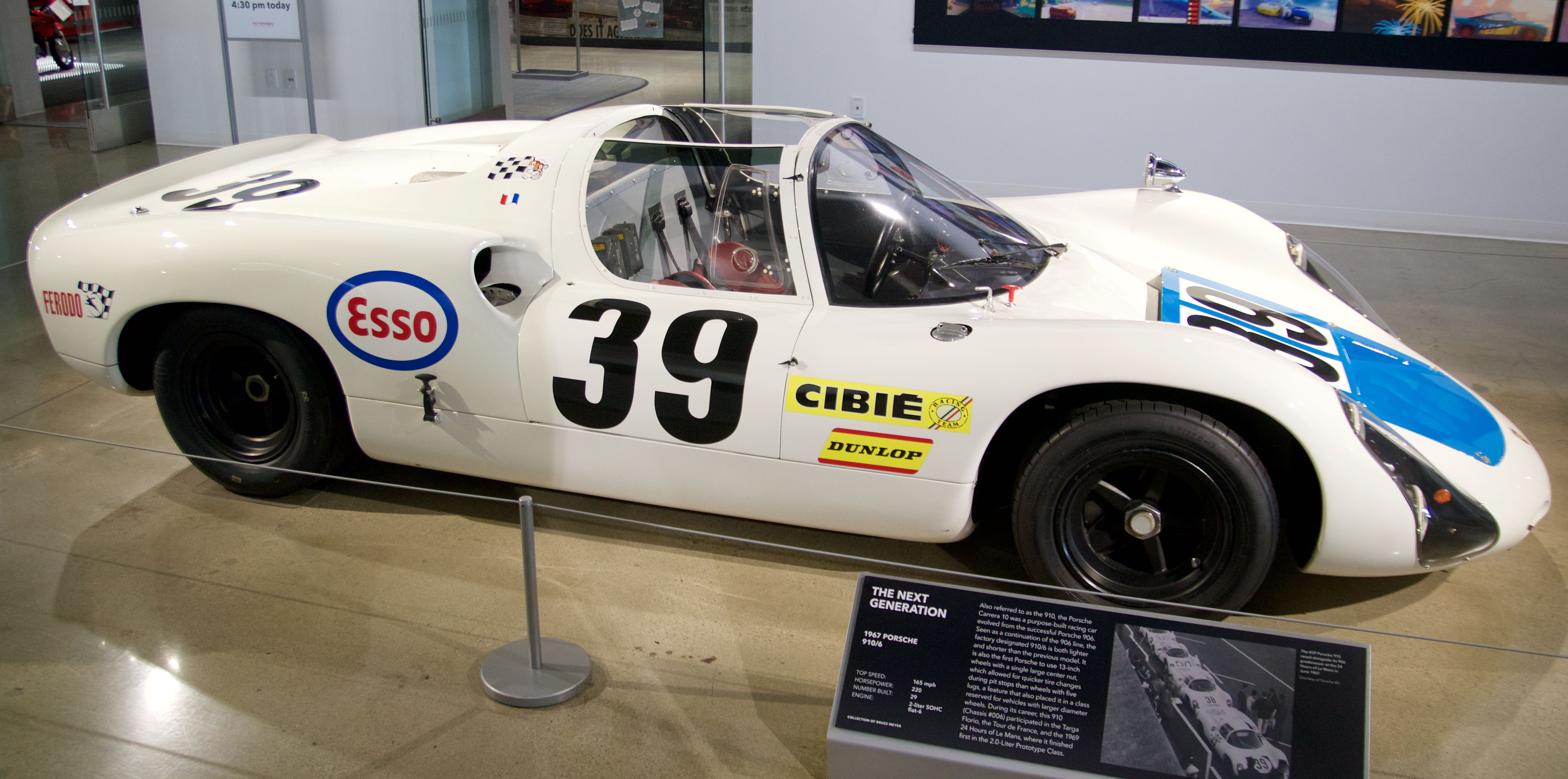
Porsche 910 #39 of Schütz/Buzzetta, which retired due to engine issues

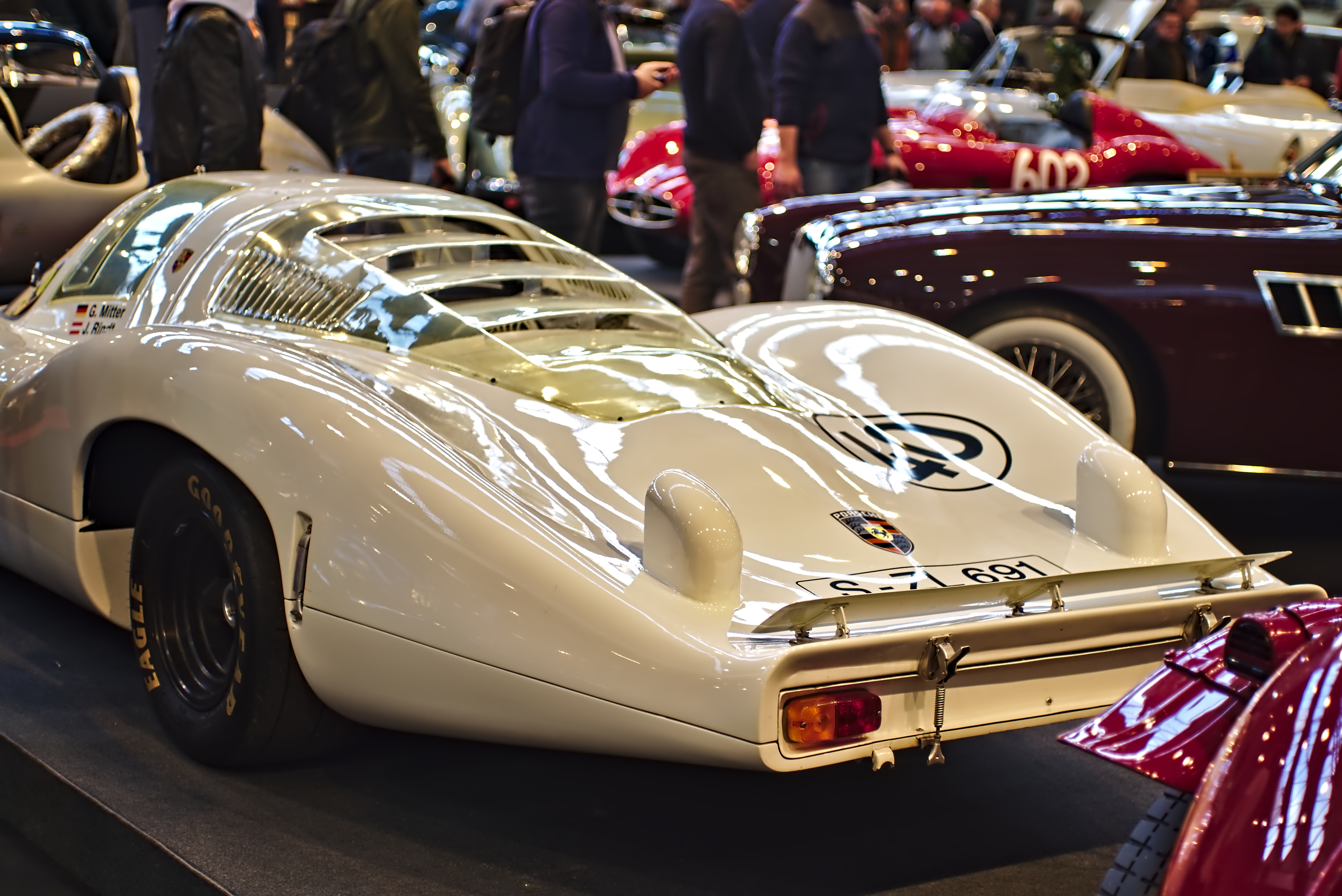
Porsche 907 #40 of Rindt/Mitter with long tail, DNF due to engine

Once again, Porsche arrived with a new prototype evolved from the Porsche 906 Carrera 6 that was homologated in 1966 and used mainly by customers teams, winning the S 2.0 class in the 1966 and 1967 World Sportscar Championship. To leave the sportscar homologation restrictions of the 906 behind, Porsche already in 1966 introduced the 910 to use different engine options, upgraded suspension and long tail bodies. In 1967, the new workhorse scored dominant wins at the twisty tracks, a 1-2-3 podium sweep at the Targa Florio, followed by a 1-2-3-4 at the Nürburgring 1000km. While the complicated former Formula One F8 engine with 2.2L performed consistently in the hillclimbs and the few endurance races it was used, culminating in an overall victory at the Targa, it finished only 4th in the home race behind its siblings, while it put its car into the P+2.0 or P5.0 class with overwhelming competition on fast circuits where the 2.0L F6 engines (fuel-injected for 220 bhp) had scored podium finishes, 3rd at Sebring and Monza, even 2nd at Spa. For Le Mans, the team was cautious and only entered the 2.0L classes. All Porsches had F6 engines, not only the homologated pair of 906 sportscars and the various 911, but also the two regular 910 of Rolf Stommelen/Jochen Neerpasch and Targa Florio winners Udo Schütz/Joe Buzzetta. However, the team also introduced a new car: the 907 was switched over to RHD steering and had a new narrow cabin body, similar to future 908 and 917. Two of these 907 cars were present, fitted with very long tails specifically for the Ligne droite des Hunaudières (Mulsanne Straight), driven by 1965 race-winner Jochen Rindt with current Hillclimb champion Gerhard Mitter, and Jo Siffert/Hans Herrmann.

As neither Alfa Romeo nor any of Ferrari's Dino 206 S showed, Porsche's main opposition would be from Matra. Their new MS630 still used the 2-litre BRM V8 F1-derived engine, but it was built to also be capable of carrying the Ford 4.7-litre V8 (which was tried at the April test weekend) as well as a new Matra V12 3-litre F1 engine still being developed. Although capable of 290 km/h (180 mph) in a straight line, its cornering handling meant it was still slower than the Porsche. The same driver-combinations returned: Jean-Pierre Beltoise/Johnny Servoz-Gavin alongside Jean-Pierre Jaussaud/Henri Pescarolo.

Last present in 1964, Team Elite returned to Le Mans with the new Lotus 47, the race version of the Lotus Europa. Colin Chapman’s new design was fitted with a 165 bhp Ford 1.6-litre twin-cam engine.

Alpine arrived with seven entries of its A210 including two for its customer team, Ecurie Savin-Calberson. A range of the Renault-Gordini engine were offered in 1000, 1300 and 1500cc; that latter engine was raced by veterans Mauro Bianchi/Jean Vinatier. There was also an older M64 entered by NART. The two drivers, Therier and Chevallier, had been chosen from 200 applicants in a speed-trial by team-owner Luigi Chinetti.

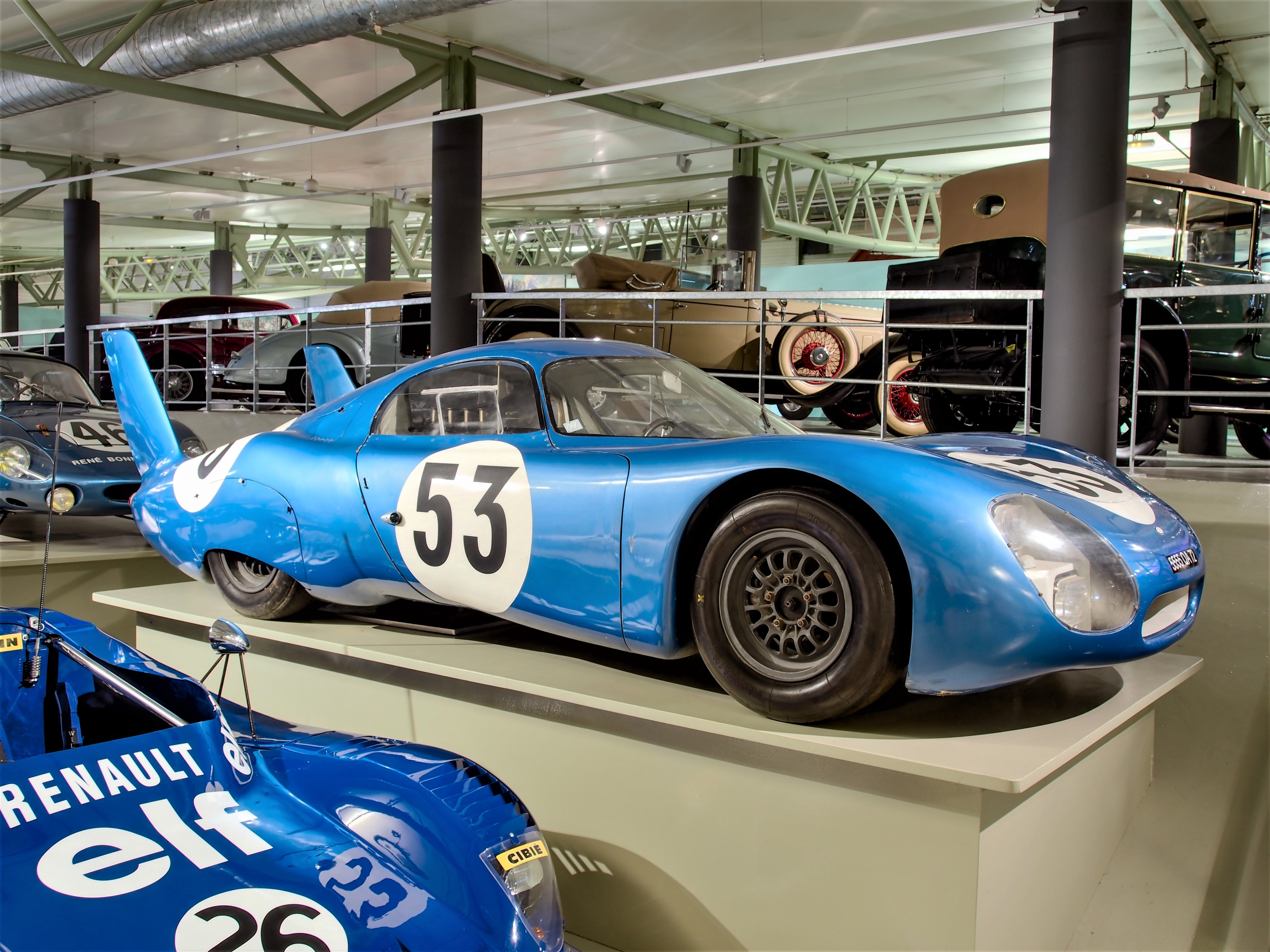
CD SP66 of Guilhaudin/Bertaut, which retired due to engine issues

After bringing the Mini-Marcos to Le Mans in 1966, this year Frank Costin came up with an unusual aerodynamic design for privateer racer Roger Nathan. With a plywood frame, fibreglass bodywork, it had a 1-litre Hillman Imp engine mounted at a 45° angle, putting out 97 bhp. And making up the class were the returning entries from CD-Peugeot, Marcos and Austin-Healey.

There were only six cars in the Group 4 Sports Cars category, as many of the prototypes could not be produced in sufficient numbers, as Ferrari had found out with the Dino 206 S, ending production at 18. Other types were outdated or mismatched, like the 1965 winning Ferrari 250 LM with only a 3.3 litre engine, too small for S5.0. Three Ford GT40s were entered in that class, by Ford France, Scuderia Filipinetti and John Wyer’s J.W. Automotive. Porsche factory-entered a standard 906 for Ben Pon and Vic Elford, the Rally driver making his Le Mans debut, another 906 S2.0 entry came from French privateer Christian Poirot. Abarth was back at Le Mans for the first time since 1962, with the French Ecurie du Maine running one of the new Abarth 1300 OT in S1.3. It had Abarth’s own 1.3-litre DOHC engine, that developed 147 bhp.

In a similarly small field, there were only the seven entrants in the Group 3 GT category. The Scuderia Filipinetti and Equipe Nationale Belge teams supplemented their Prototype entries with Ferrari 275 GTBs. They were up against Belgian privateer Claude Dubois, running a burly Shelby-modified Ford Mustang GT350, and an American-entered second generation Corvette Stingray. Finally, there were four Porsche 911 S in GT2.0, as the car started becoming the privateer’s car of choice.

This year also saw the increasing significance of the “war” between the tyre-companies, as they partnered with major manufacturers: Goodyear with Ford, Firestone with Ferrari, Dunlop with Porsche and Michelin with Alpine.

== Entry list ==
No.	Group	Entrant	Car		Drivers
1	P+5.0	(United States) Ford Motor Company (United States) Shelby American Inc.	Ford GT40 Mk.IV	Ford 7.0L V8	(United States) Dan Gurney (United States) A.J. Foyt
2	P+5.0	(United States) Ford Motor Company (United States) Shelby American Inc.	Ford GT40 Mk.IV	Ford 7.0L V8	(New Zealand) Bruce McLaren (United States) Mark Donohue
3	P+5.0	(United States) Ford Motor Company (United States) Holman & Moody	Ford GT40 Mk.IV	Ford 7.0L V8	(Belgium) Lucien Bianchi (United States) Mario Andretti
4	P+5.0	(United States) Ford Motor Company (United States) Holman & Moody	Ford GT40 Mk.IV	Ford 7.0L V8	(New Zealand) Denny Hulme (United States) Lloyd Ruby
5	P+5.0	(United States) Ford Motor Company (United States) Holman & Moody	Ford GT40 Mk.II B	Ford 7.0L V8	(Australia) Frank Gardner (United States) Roger McCluskey
6	P+5.0	Ford France S.A.	Ford GT40 Mk.II B	Ford 7.0L V8	(France) Jo Schlesser (France) Guy Ligier
7	P+5.0	(United States) Chaparral Cars, Inc.	Chaparral 2F	Chevrolet 7.0L V8	(United Kingdom) Mike Spence (United States) Phil Hill
8	P+5.0	(United States) Chaparral Cars, Inc.	Chaparral 2F	Chevrolet 7.0L V8	(United States) Bruce Jennings (United States) Bob Johnson
9	GT+5.0	(United States) Dana Chevrolet Inc.	Chevrolet Corvette Stingray	Chevrolet 7.0L V8	(United States) Bob Bondurant (United States) Dick Guldstrand
10	P+5.0	(Italy) Prototipi Bizzarrini	Bizzarrini GT Strada 5300	Chevrolet 5.4L V8	(Switzerland) Edgar Berney (Italy) Giancarlo Naddeo
11	P+5.0	(United Kingdom) Team Surtees	Lola T70 Mk.3 GT	Aston Martin 5.0L V8	(United Kingdom) John Surtees (United Kingdom) David Hobbs
12	P+5.0	(United Kingdom) Team Surtees	Lola T70 Mk.3 GT	Aston Martin 5.0L V8	(United Kingdom) Chris Irwin (South Africa) Peter de Klerk
14	P+5.0	(United Kingdom) J.W. Automotive Engineering	Mirage M1	Ford 5.0L V8	(United Kingdom) David Piper (United States) Dick Thompson
15	P+5.0	(United Kingdom) J.W. Automotive Engineering	Mirage M1	Ford 5.0L V8	(Belgium) Jacky Ickx (United Kingdom) Brian Muir
16	S5.0	Ford France S.A.	Ford GT40 Mk.I	Ford 4.7L V8	(France) Pierre Dumay (France) Henri Greder
17	GT5.0	(Belgium) Claude Dubois	Shelby GT350	Ford 4.7L V8	(Belgium) Claude Dubois (Belgium) Chris Tuerlinckx
18	S5.0	(Switzerland) Scuderia Filipinetti	Ford GT40 Mk.I	Ford 4.7L V8	(Italy) Umberto Maglioli (Italy) Mario Casoni
19	P5.0	(Italy) SpA Ferrari S.E.F.A.C.	Ferrari 330 P4	Ferrari 4.0L V12	(Germany) Günther Klass (United Kingdom) Peter Sutcliffe
20	P5.0	(Italy) SpA Ferrari S.E.F.A.C.	Ferrari 330 P3/4	Ferrari 4.0L V12	(New Zealand) Chris Amon (Italy) Nino Vacarella
21	P5.0	(Italy) SpA Ferrari S.E.F.A.C.	Ferrari 330 P4	Ferrari 4.0L V12	(Italy) Ludovico Scarfiotti (United Kingdom) Mike Parkes
22	P5.0	(Switzerland) Scuderia Filipinetti	Ferrari 412 P	Ferrari 4.0L V12	(France) Jean Guichet (Switzerland) Herbert Müller
23	P5.0	(United Kingdom) Maranello Concessionaries	Ferrari 412 P	Ferrari 4.0L V12	(United Kingdom) Richard Attwood (United Kingdom) Piers Courage
24	P5.0	(Belgium) Equipe Nationale Belge	Ferrari 330 P4	Ferrari 4.0L V12	(Belgium) Willy Mairesse (Belgium) "Jean Beurlys"
25	P5.0	(United States) North American Racing Team	Ferrari 412 P	Ferrari 4.0L V12	(Mexico) Pedro Rodríguez (Italy) Giancarlo Baghetti
26	P5.0	(United States) North American Racing Team	Ferrari 365 P2	Ferrari 4.3L V12	(United States) Chuck Parsons (Mexico) Ricardo Rodríguez
28	GT5.0	(Switzerland) Scuderia Filipinetti	Ferrari 275 GTB/C	Ferrari 3.3L V12	(Switzerland) Rico Steinemann (Switzerland) Dieter Spoerry
29	P2.0	(France) Matra Sports	Matra M630	BRM 2.0L V8	(France) Jean-Pierre Beltoise (France) Johnny Servoz-Gavin
30	P2.0	(France) Matra Sports	Matra M630	BRM 2.0L V8	(France) Jean-Pierre Jaussaud (France) Henri Pescarolo
37	S2.0	(Germany) Porsche System Engineering	Porsche 906	Porsche 2.0L F6	(United Kingdom) Vic Elford (Netherlands) Ben Pon
38	P2.0	(Germany) Porsche System Engineering	Porsche 910	Porsche 2.0L F6	(Germany) Rolf Stommelen (Germany) Jochen Neerpasch
39	P2.0	(Germany) Porsche System Engineering	Porsche 910	Porsche 2.0L F6	(Germany) Udo Schütz (United States) Joe Buzzetta
40	P2.0	(Germany) Porsche System Engineering	Porsche 907 LH	Porsche 2.0L F6	(Austria) Jochen Rindt (Germany) Gerhard Mitter
41	P2.0	(Germany) Porsche System Engineering	Porsche 907 LH	Porsche 2.0L F6	(Switzerland) Jo Siffert (Germany) Hans Herrmann
42	GT2.0	(France) Auguste Veuillet	Porsche 911 S	Porsche 2.0L F6	(France) Robert Buchet (Germany) Herbert Linge
43	GT2.0	(France) J. Franc	Porsche 911 S	Porsche 2.0L F6	(France) "Franc" (Germany) Anton Fischhaber
44	P1.6	(United Kingdom) Team Elite	Lotus 47	Ford 1.6L L4	(United Kingdom) David Preston (United Kingdom) John Wagstaff
45	P1.6	(France) Société des Automobiles Alpine	Alpine A210	Renault 1.5L L4	(France) Jean Vinatier (Belgium) Mauro Bianchi
46	P1.3	(France) Société des Automobiles Alpine	Alpine A210	Renault 1.3L L4	(France) Henri Grandsire (France) José Rosinski
47	P1.3	(France) Société des Automobiles Alpine	Alpine A210	Renault 1.3L L4	(France) Robert Bouharde (France) Jean-Claude Andruet
48	P1.3	(France) Ecurie Savin-Calberson	Alpine A210	Renault 1.3L L4	(France) Roger Delageneste (France) Jacques Cheinisse
49	P1.3	(France) Ecurie Savin-Calberson	Alpine A210	Renault 1.3L L4	(France) André de Cortanze (France) Alain LeGuellec
50	P1.3	(United Kingdom) Marcos Racing Ltd.	Marcos Mini GT	BMC 1.3L L4	(United Kingdom) Chris Lawrence (United Kingdom) Jem Marsh
51	P1.3	(United Kingdom) Donald Healey Motor Co.	Austin-Healey Sprite Le Mans	BMC 1.3L L4	(United Kingdom) Clive Baker (United Kingdom) Andrew Hedges
52	P1.15	(France) SEC Automobiles CD	CD SP66 C	Peugeot 1.15L L4	(France) Claude Ballot-Léna (France) Denis Dayan
53	P1.15	(France) SEC Automobiles CD	CD SP66 C	Peugeot 1.15L L4	(France) André Guilhaudin (France) Alain Bertaut
54	P1.15	(United Kingdom) Roger Nathan Racing Ltd.	Costin-Nathan GT	Hillman 1.0L L4	(United Kingdom) Roger Nathan (United Kingdom) Mike Beckwith
55	P1.15	(United States) North American Racing Team	Alpine M64	Renault 1.0L L4	(France) Jean-Luc Thérier (France) François Chevalier
56	P1.15	(France) Société des Automobiles Alpine	Alpine A210	Renault 1.0L L4	(France) Gérard Larrousse (France) Patrick Depailler
57	P+5.0	(United States) Ford Motor Company (United States) Shelby American Inc.	Ford GT40 Mk.II B	Ford 7.0L V8	(United States) Ronnie Bucknum (Australia) Paul Hawkins
58	P1.3	(France) Société des Automobiles Alpine	Alpine A210	Renault 1.3L L4	(France) Philippe Vidal (Italy) Leo Cella
60	GT2.0	(France) Philippe Farjon	Porsche 911 S	Porsche 2.0L F6	(Switzerland) André Wicky (France) Philippe Farjon
61	GT5.0	(Belgium) Equipe Nationale Belge	Ferrari 275 GTB/C	Ferrari 3.3L V12	(Belgium) Gustave Gosselin (Belgium) Hughes de Fierlant
62	S5.0	(United Kingdom) J.W. Automotive Engineering	Ford GT40 Mk.I	Ford 4.7L V8	(United Kingdom) Mike Salmon (United Kingdom) Brian Redman
64	S1.3	(France) Ecurie du Maine	Abarth 1300 OT	Abarth 1.3L L4	(France) Marcel Martin (France) Jean Mésange
66	S2.0	(France) Christian Poirot	Porsche 906	Porsche 2.0L F6	(Germany) Gerhard Koch (France) Christian Poirot
67	GT2.0	(France) Pierre Boutin	Porsche 911 S	Porsche 2.0L F6	(France) Pierre Boutin (France) Patrice Sanson

== Test Weekend ==
At the April Test Weekend, Bandini was fastest in the Ferrari P4 spyder with a sensational lap record of 3:25.4, ahead of Parkes in the other P4, then Surtees in the Lola (3:31.9). Although Donohue could reach 330 km/h (210 mph) in the Ford MkIV. he could only get 4th fastest time (3:32.6). The weekend also had tragedy when Roby Weber in the new Matra lost control at full speed on Mulsanne Straight. The car skidded and somersaulted off the track. Trapped in the burning car Weber died before marshals could reach the accident in time.

== Practice ==
By race week, Ford had made further aerodynamic improvements and the MkIVs were going even faster. However the cars were very unstable at high speed creating a lot of concern among the drivers, and all the cars had problems with their windscreens cracking and popping out at the high speeds The Ferrari team was not without its own problems: the NART P2, going slow, got in the way of Klass’ P4 sending him off into the trees and wrecking the car but leaving the driver uninjured. Pole position went to Bruce McLaren (3:24.4), just ahead of the surprisingly rapid Chaparral of Phil Hill (3:24.7). Then came the Fords of Andretti, Hulme, Bucknum and Gardner before Parkes’ Ferrari down in 7th with 3:28.9.

Initially qualified with their 5.7-litre engines, the Mirages then both had failures and JWA decided to change back to the 5.0-litre engines. However, the scrutineers pointed out that this could not be done as the cars still carried the larger fuel tanks for the 5.0+ class. Ford, however, managed to supply two engines slightly larger than 5 litres to allow the cars to race. The Team Elite Lotus had a similar problem but resolved theirs by putting empty plastic bottles in the fuel tank.

All speeds were up and during the race twenty cars were recorded doing over 300 km/h over a flying kilometre on the Mulsanne Straight:

Drivers	Car	Speed
Andretti / Bianchi	Ford Mk IV	343 km/h
Gurney / Foyt	Ford Mk IV	340 km/h
Hulme / Ruby	Ford Mk IV	340 km/h
McLaren / Donohue	Ford Mk IV	333 km/h
Bucknum / Hawkins	Ford Mk IIB	332 km/h
Surtees / Hobbs	Lola T70 Mk3 GT	330 km/h
P.Hill / Spence	Chaparral 2F	320 km/h
Scarfiotti / Parkes	Ferrari 330P4	310 km/h

== Race ==
=== Start ===
Although the day started overcast, the race started in fine weather. Bucknum's Ford and Rodriguez's NART P3 were first away, while both Chaparrals were among the last as Jim Hall insisted on his drivers doing up their full race-harness before leaving. At the end of the first lap it was the Mk IIBs of Bucknum and Gardner leading Gurney's MkIV, then the Ferraris of Rodriguez and Amon, and Surtees in the Lola. On the fourth lap the Lola's engine broke a piston. Spence meanwhile made great pace to work his way back up the field.

Early visitors to the pits included Hulme's Mk IV to fix a sticking throttle, Bianchi's Mk IV to check his windscreen after an errant stone cracked it and Gardner's Ford for a new front tyre. Dubois brought the Shelby Mustang in missing half its front spoiler after bumping fenders in the startline rush and Jaussaud because his Matra's door wouldn't shut properly. Bucknum continued to lead past the first hour, up to the first pitstops. After all the leaders had pitted, it was Foyt now leading from Hill in the Chaparral and the Fords of Andretti and McLaren with Parkes in 5th.

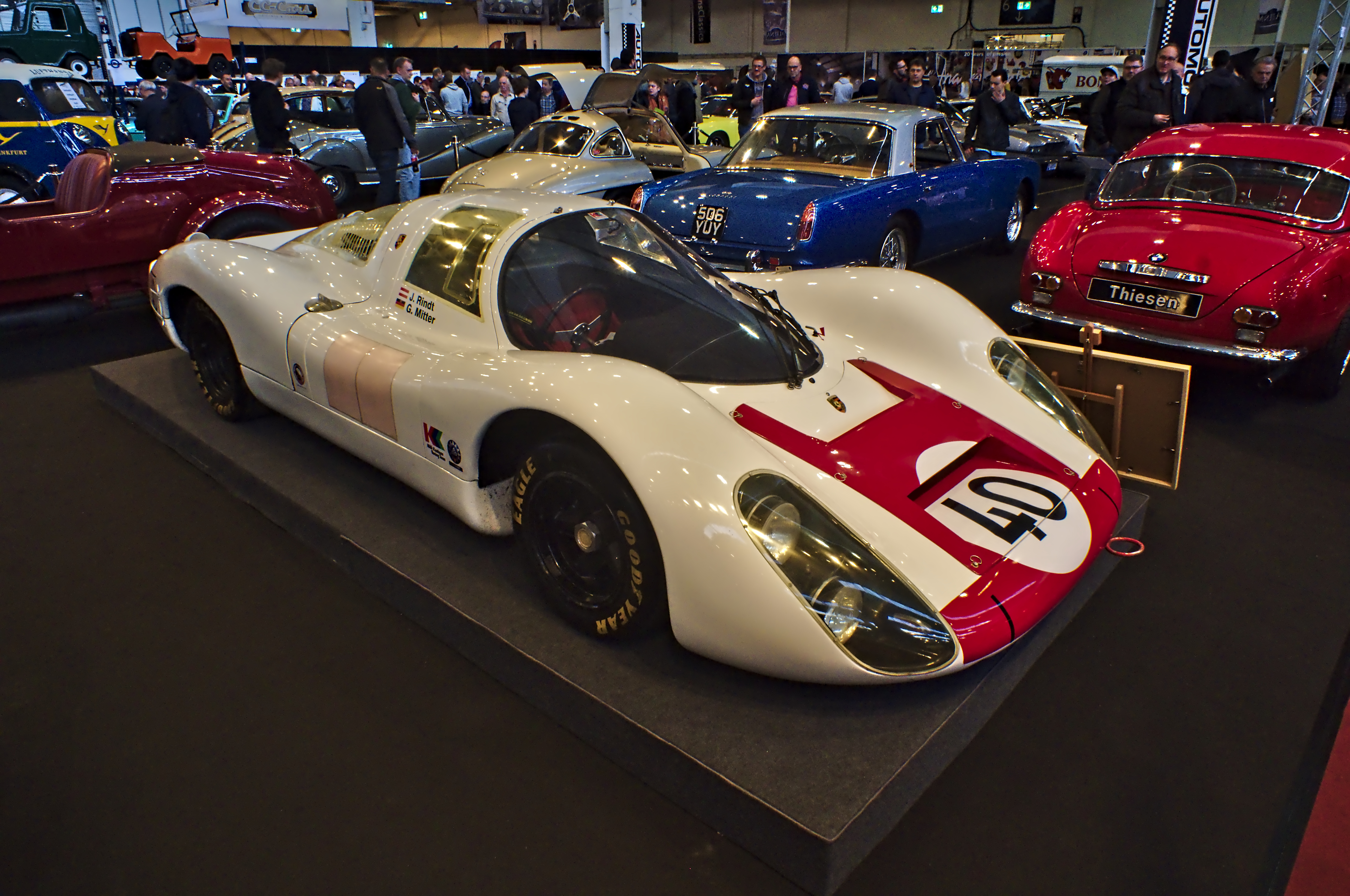
Porsche 907 LH of Mitter/Rindt, which retired after 9 hours. A similar 907 won the P2.0 class.

Suddenly Mike Salmon's JWA Ford GT burst into flames at over 300 km/h down the back straight with a full tank of fuel. Salmon bravely got the car near to a marshal post at Mulsanne corner before jumping out but was taken to hospital with severe 2nd and 3rd-degree burns. After two hours, the three Americans Foyt, Hill and Andretti (33 laps) already had a lap on the Ferraris and the rest of the field. After his early delay, Hulme then set a new lap record of 3:23.6, faster than the record pole time. The Ferraris were playing a long game, driving within their capability to last the distance. The Porsches of Siffert/Herrmann and Mitter/Rindt, now up to 14th and 15th overall, had a comfortable lead in the Index of Performance. However the big British cars were all out before dark: both the Mirages and the second Lola gone with engine issues after running outside the top-10.

=== Night ===
Soon after 10pm, as night was falling, Amon's Ferrari suffered a puncture while running 5th. Because of a faulty mallet he could not change the tyre out on the track and while crawling back to the pits, sparks from the wheel hub started a fire in the engine. Amon was forced to bail out quickly (unharmed) at a distance from any marshal posts and the car was burnt to a wreck. Not long later the Chaparral had to pit with its aileron stuck in the brake position, making the car lose about 20 km/h off its top speed. Bucknum lost two hours to get a water-pipe rewelded then had to creep around for two laps to reach the mandatory 25-lap minimum for liquids replenishment Twice Lloyd Ruby ditched his Ford in the Mulsanne corner sandtrap, losing all the time Hulme had made up having to get repairs to the undertray. The second incident proved terminal.

The Rodriguez/Baghetti NART Ferrari had slipped down the field and retired after 2am with a burnt piston. By 3am Ford was 1-2-3 with Gurney (182 laps) leading Andretti (who had recently matched Hulme's lap record) and McLaren by three laps. At 3:35 am, still running second, Andretti pitted J-7, the #3 Mk IV. A. J. Foyt, who had brought in J-5, the #1 Mk IV at the same time, was complaining loudly about his American rival's aggressive driving. Distracted by this “discussion,” a mechanic changing the front brake pads on J-7 installed a pad backward (which could be done). Andretti accelerated out of the pits and under the Dunlop bridge, but when he braked for the first time, from high speed going into the Esses, the incorrectly installed front brake locked, and J-7 spun, hitting the earth banks and ending up in disarray in the middle of the track. Andretti, with three broken ribs, leapt out and behind the wall. (It later transpired that Bianchi was right and the brakes had been put in back to front) Soon behind him at speed came McCluskey (9th) who deliberately hit the other wall believing the wreck might still have the driver trapped inside, then Schlesser (6th) who tried to weave between the two. Both crashed and suddenly Ford were down three cars. McCluskey, carrying the injured Andretti, commandeered a marshal's car and drove back to the Ford medical centre.

McLaren picked up a second puncture going through the debris, and then lost more time with clutch issues. To top it off, the rear engine bonnet later flew off racing down the Mulsanne straight and another 45 minutes were lost retrieving and refitting it, dropping them to 6th.

This left the Gurney/Foyt car with a 5-lap lead and elevated the Parkes/Scarfiotti Ferrari to second and the Hill/Spence Chaparral fighting back up to third. During the night, Gurney had eased off a little to preserve his car, and Parkes came up behind in the second-place Ferrari to unlap himself. For several miles Parkes hounded the Ford, flashing his lights in Gurney's mirrors until an exasperated Gurney simply pulled over at Arnage corner and stopped on a grass verge. Parkes stopped behind him, and the two race leaders sat there in the dark, motionless. Finally, Parkes conceded his attempt at provoking a race with Gurney was not going to work and he pulled out and resumed the race, with Gurney following shortly after. The Siffert/Herrmann Porsche still led the Index of Performance although it was now being chased by the improving Alpine of Larrousse/Depailler.

=== Morning ===
Dawn arrived clear and cold, with little mist this year. The Chaparral developed an oil-leak in the transmission dropping it down the order and then eventual retirement. The Belgian Ferrari P4 had been having a consistent race and slotted into third, with the other P4 of Klass/Sutcliffe now in fourth. However, a broken fuel-injection pump forced their retirement mid-morning. The Corvette retired with a broken conrod while leading the GT category.

Bucknum and Hawkins, early race-leaders, had driven hard to get back up to 6th after their overnight delay when they were finally halted by engine issues at 9.40am. So by 10am, the three-quarter mark, there were only 16 cars still running. Gurney and Foyt had already covered 293 laps, twenty more than McLaren and Amon had the previous year at the same time. With a decent lead, the leading Ford could afford to drop its lap times by 30 seconds a lap. Even though the Ferraris were lapping 10 seconds a lap faster and could go 20% further between fuel-stops, they were unable to make significant inroads, and the remaining quarter of the race was largely uneventful.

=== Finish and post-race ===
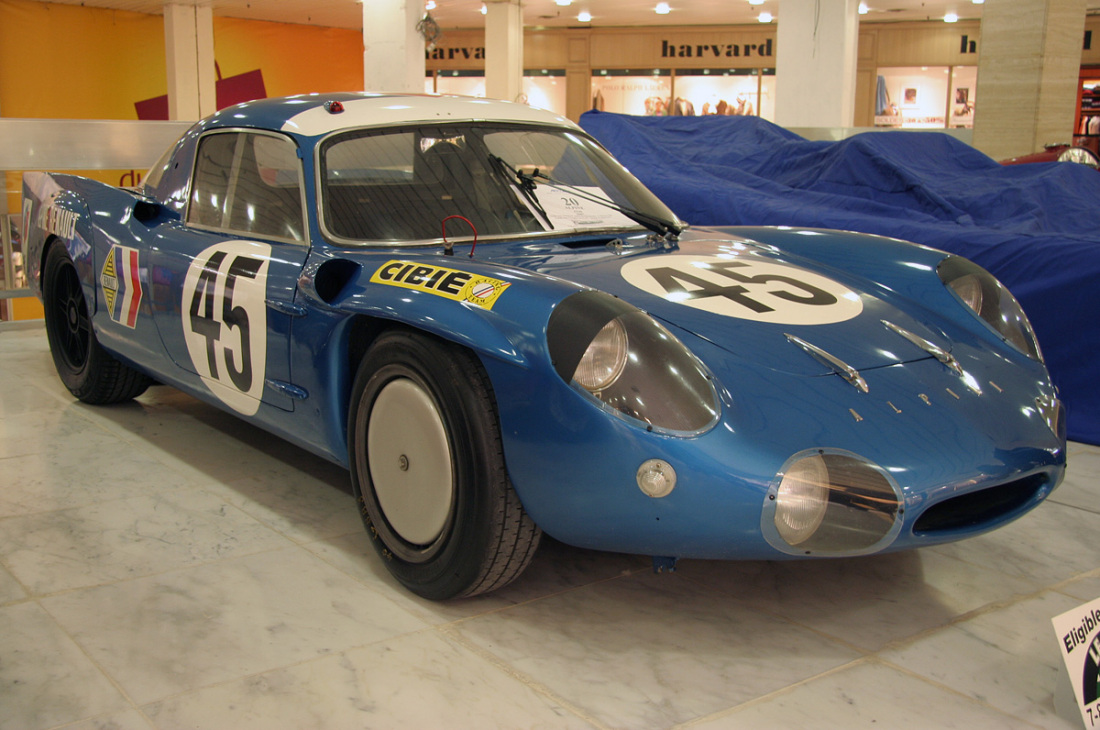
Alpine A210 ofBianchi/Vinatier, which won the P 1.6 class

In the end it was a comfortable victory for the all-American Ford with Gurney and Foyt winning by four laps, having led for all but the first 90 minutes of the race. Theirs was the only one of the ten Fords that did not have any issues throughout the race. Perhaps surprisingly for such a big engine, they also won the Index of Thermal Efficiency from their record distance covered. Ferrari salvaged some pride after the previous year's debacle with second and third, with McLaren/Donohue fighting back to fourth. As of 2026 this Gurney/Foyt victory remains both the only all-American victory in Le Mans history — American drivers (Dan Gurney and A. J. Foyt), team (Shelby-American Inc.), chassis constructor (Ford USA), engine manufacturer (Ford), and tires (Goodyear) — as well as the only victory of a car designed and built entirely (both chassis and engine) in the United States.

Siffert and Herrmann were 5th in their new Porsche 907 2-litre, covering just 12 km less than the 1966 winners. They led home three more Porsche, the Stommelen/Neerpasch 910, and Pon/Elford in 7th being the first 906 Group 4 car home, surviving all of the GT40 Mk.I, while the other privateer Porsche 906 in 8th just beat the Alpine of Grandsire/Rosinski who won the 1300-class. The Swiss Ferrari GTB of Spoerry/Steinemann was the first GT home, coming 11th, nine laps ahead of the only French 911 that finished. The Austin-Healey, perennial finishers, was the only British car to make it to the end, in 15th. The little Abarth, after a race bedevilled by issues, did finish (in last place) but had not completed enough laps to be classified, being a victim of the record performances of the leaders that had 5 times the engine capacity.

When the winners mounted the victory stand, Gurney was handed the traditional magnum of champagne. Looking down, he saw Ford CEO Henry Ford II, team owner Carroll Shelby, their wives, and several journalists who had predicted disaster for the high-profile duo of Gurney and Foyt. They had said that the two drivers, who were strongly competitive in the United States, would break their car in intramural rivalry. Instead, both drivers took special care to drive the car with discipline and won easily. On the victory stand, Gurney shook the bottle and sprayed everyone nearby, establishing a tradition re-enacted in victory celebrations the world over ever since.

"What I did with the Champagne was totally spontaneous. I had no idea it would start a tradition. I was beyond caring and just got caught up in the moment. It was one of those once-in-a-lifetime occasions where things turned out perfectly... I thought this hard-fought victory needed something special”.

Gurney, incidentally, autographed and gave the bottle of champagne to Life Magazine photographer, Flip Schulke, who used it as a lamp for 30 years. Schulke later returned the bottle to Gurney, who placed it in his All American Racers team headquarters’ boardroom in California.

Chaparral got its due reward a month later with the only victory for the 2F at Brands Hatch. It was a suitable finale for Phil Hill, 1961 F1 World Champion to retire from a distinguished sports-car racing career that included three Le Mans victories.

== Official results ==
=== Finishers ===
Results taken from Quentin Spurring's book, officially licensed by the ACO Class Winners are in Bold text.

Pos	Class	No	Team	Drivers	Chassis	Engine	Laps
1	**P** **+5.0**	**1**	(United States) **Ford Motor Company** (United States) **Shelby-American Inc.**	(United States) **Dan Gurney** (United States) **A. J. Foyt**	Ford GT40 Mk.IV	Ford 7.0L V8	388
2	**P** **5.0**	**21**	(Italy) **SpA Ferrari SEFAC**	(Italy) **Ludovico Scarfiotti** (United Kingdom) **Mike Parkes**	Ferrari 330 P4	Ferrari 4.0L V12	384
3	P 5.0	24	(Belgium) Equipe Nationale Belge	(Belgium) Willy Mairesse (Belgium) “Beurlys” (Jean Blaton)	Ferrari 330 P4	Ferrari 4.0L V12	377
4	P +5.0	2	(United States) Ford Motor Company (United States) Shelby-American Inc.	(New Zealand) Bruce McLaren (United States) Mark Donohue	Ford GT40 Mk.IV	Ford 7.0L V8	359
5	**P** **2.0**	**41**	(Germany) **Porsche System Engineering**	(Switzerland) **Jo Siffert** (Germany) **Hans Herrmann**	Porsche 907 langheck	Porsche 1991cc F6	358
6	P 2.0	38	(Germany) Porsche System Engineering	(Germany) Rolf Stommelen (Germany) Jochen Neerpasch	Porsche 910 kurzheck	Porsche 1991cc F6	351
7	**S** **2.0**	**37**	(Germany) **Porsche System Engineering**	(Netherlands) **Ben Pon** (United Kingdom) **Vic Elford**	Porsche 906	Porsche 1991cc F6	327
8	S 2.0	66 (reserve)	(France) C. Poirot (private entrant)	(France) Christian Poirot (Germany) Gerhard ‘Gerd’ Koch	Porsche 906	Porsche 1991cc F6	321
9	**P** **1.3**	**46**	(France) **Société Automobiles**; **Alpine**	(France) **Henri Grandsire** (France) **José Rosinski**	Alpine A210	Renault-Gordini 1296cc S4	321
10	P 1.3	49	(France) Ecurie Savin-Calberson	(France) André de Cortanze (France) Alain LeGuellec	Alpine A210	Renault-Gordini 1296cc S4	318
11	**GT**; **5.0**	**28**	(Switzerland) **Scuderia Filipinetti**	(Switzerland) **Dieter Spoerry** (Switzerland) **Hans-Heinrich 'Rico' Steinemann**	Ferrari 275 GTB; Competizione	Ferrari 3.3L V12	317
12	P 1.3	48	(France) Ecurie Savin-Calberson	(France) Roger Delageneste (France) Jacques Cheinisse	Alpine A210	Renault-Gordini 1296cc S4	311
13	**P** **1.6**	**45**	(France) **Société Automobiles**; **Alpine**	(Belgium) **Mauro Bianchi** (France) **Jean Vinatier**	Alpine A210	Renault-Gordini 1470cc S4	311
14	**GT**; **2.0**	**42**	(France) **Auguste Veuillet**	(France) **Robert Buchet** (Germany) **Herbert Linge**	Porsche 911 S	Porsche 1991cc F6	308
15	P 1.3	51	(United Kingdom) Donald Healey Motor Company	(United Kingdom) Clive Baker (United Kingdom) Andrew Hedges	Austin-Healey Sprite Le Mans	BMC 1293cc S4	289
N/C*	S 1.3	64 (reserve)	(France) Ecurie du Maine	(France) Marcel Martin (France) Jean Mesange	Abarth 1300 OT	Fiat-Abarth 1289cc S4	262

- 'Note *: Not Classified because Insufficient distance covered.

=== Did Not Finish ===
Pos	Class	No	Team	Drivers	Chassis	Engine	Laps	Reason
DNF	P +5.0	57 (reserve)	(United States) Ford Motor Company (United States) Shelby-American Inc.	(United States) Ronnie Bucknum (Australia) Paul Hawkins	Ford GT40 Mk.IIB	Ford 7.0L V8	271	valve (18hr)
DNF	P 5.0	19	(Italy) SpA Ferrari SEFAC	(Germany) Günter Klass (United Kingdom) Peter Sutcliffe	Ferrari 330 P4	Ferrari 4.0L V12	246	fuel pump (18hr)
DNF	P +5.0	7	(United States) Chaparral Cars Inc.	(United States) Phil Hill (United Kingdom) Mike Spence	Chaparral 2F	Chevrolet 7.0L V8	225	transmission (18hr)
DNF	P 1.3	47	(France) Société Automobiles; Alpine	(France) Jean-Claude Andruet (France) Robert Bouharde	Alpine A210	Renault-Gordini 1296cc S4	219	accident (17hr)
DNF	P 5.0	23	(United Kingdom) Maranello Concessionaires	(United Kingdom) Richard Attwood (United Kingdom) Piers Courage	Ferrari 412 P	Ferrari 4.0L V12	208	oil pump (15hr)
DNF	P 1.15	56	(France) Société Automobiles; Alpine	(France) Gérard Larrousse (France) Patrick Depailler	Alpine A210	Renault-Gordini 1005cc S4	204	engine (17hr)
DNF	P 1.15	55	(United States) North American Racing Team	(France) Jean-Luc Thérier (France) François Chevalier	Alpine M64	Renault-Gordini 1005cc S4	201	engine (18hr)
DNF	P +5.0	3	(United States) Ford Motor Company (United States) Holman & Moody	(United States) Mario Andretti (Belgium) Lucien Bianchi	Ford GT40 Mk.IV	Ford 7.0L V8	188	accident (13hr)
DNF	P +5.0	6	Ford France S.A.	(France) Jo Schlesser (France) Guy Ligier	Ford GT40 Mk.IIB	Ford 7.0L V8	183	accident (13hr)
DNF	P +5.0	5	(United States) Ford Motor Company (United States) Holman & Moody	(United States) Roger McCluskey (Australia) Frank Gardner	Ford GT40 Mk.IIB	Ford 7.0L V8	179	accident (13hr)
DNF	GT +5.0	9	(United States) Dana Chevrolet Inc.	(United States) Bob Bondurant (United States) Dick Guldstrand	Chevrolet Corvette Stingray	Chevrolet 7.0L V8	167	engine (13hr)
DNF	P 2.0	29	(France) Equipe Matra Sports	(France) Jean-Pierre Beltoise (France) Johnny Servoz-Gavin	Matra MS630	BRM 1998cc V8	155	oil pipe (12hr)
DNF	P 5.0	25	(United States) North American Racing Team	(Mexico) Pedro Rodríguez (Italy) Giancarlo Baghetti	Ferrari 412 P	Ferrari 4.0L V12	144	piston (11hr)
DSQ	GT; 2.0	67 (reserve)	(France) P. Boutin (private entrant)	(France) Pierre Boutin (France) Patrice Sanson	Porsche 911 S	Porsche 1991cc F6	134	premature oil change (11hr)
DNF	S 5.0	16	Ford France S.A.	(Belgium) Pierre Dumay (France) Henri Greder	Ford GT40 Mk.I	Ford 4.7L V8	129	head gasket (14hr)
DNF	GT; 2.0	60 (reserve)	(France) P. Farjon (private entrant)	(France) Philippe Farjon (Switzerland) André Wicky	Porsche 911 S	Porsche 1991cc F6	126	bearings (11hr)
DNF	S 5.0	18	(Switzerland) Scuderia Filipinetti	(Italy) Umberto Maglioli (Italy) Mario Casoni	Ford GT40 Mk.I	Ford 4.7L V8	116	head gasket (9hr)
DNF	P 5.0	20	(Italy) SpA Ferrari SEFAC	(New Zealand) Chris Amon (Italy) Nino Vaccarella	Ferrari 330 P4 Spyder	Ferrari 4.0L V12	105	fire (8hr)
DNF	P 2.0	40	(Germany) Porsche System Engineering	(Germany) Gerhard Mitter (Austria) Jochen Rindt	Porsche 907 langheck	Porsche 1991cc F6	103	camshaft (9hr)
DNF	P +5.0	8	(United States) Chaparral Cars Inc.	(United States) Bob Johnson (United States) Bruce Jennings	Chaparral 2F	Chevrolet 7.0L V8	91	battery (10hr)
DNF	P 5.0	22	(Switzerland) Scuderia Filipinetti	(France) Jean Guichet (Switzerland) Herbert Müller	Ferrari 412 P	Ferrari 4.0L V12	88	piston (7hr)
DNF	P +5.0	4	(United States) Ford Motor Company (United States) Holman & Moody	(New Zealand) Denny Hulme (United States) Lloyd Ruby	Ford GT40 Mk.IV	Ford 7.0L V8	86	accident (8hr)
DNF	P 2.0	39	(Germany) Porsche System Engineering	(Germany) Udo Schütz (United States) Joe Buzzetta	Porsche 910 langheck	Porsche 1991cc F6	84	oil pressure (7hr)
DNF	P 1.15	58 (reserve)	(France) Société Automobiles; Alpine	(France) Philippe Vidal (Italy) Leo Cella	Alpine A210	Renault-Gordini 1005cc S4	67	bearings (8hr)
DNF	P +5.0	14	(United Kingdom) JW Automotive Engineering	(United Kingdom) David Piper (United States) Dick Thompson	Mirage M1	Ford 5.7L V8 (used 5.1L V8)	59	inlet valve (5hr)
DNF	GT; 5.0	17	(Belgium) C. Dubois (private entrant)	(Belgium) Claude Dubois (Belgium) Chris Tuerlinckx	Ford-Shelby Mustang GT350	Ford 4.7L V8	58	oil leak (7hr)
DNF	P 1.6	44	(United Kingdom) Team Elite	(United Kingdom) David Preston (United Kingdom) John Wagstaff	Lotus Mk.47	Ford-Cosworth 1588cc S4	42	overheating (5hr)
DNF	P 2.0	30	(France) Equipe Matra Sports	(France) Jean-Pierre Jaussaud (France) Henri Pescarolo	Matra MS630	BRM 1998cc V8	35	suspension (8hr)
DNF	P 1.15	53	(France) S.E.C. Automobiles CD	(France) André Guilhaudin (France) Alain Bertaut	CD SP66	Peugeot 1149cc S4	35	conrod (8hr)
DNF	P 5.0	26	(United States) North American Racing Team	(United States) Chuck Parsons (Mexico) Ricardo Rodríguez Cavazos	Ferrari 365 P2	Ferrari 4.4L V12	30	accident (4hr)
DNF	P +5.0	15	(United Kingdom) JW Automotive Engineering	(Belgium) Jacky Ickx (Australia) Brian Muir	Mirage M1	Ford 5.7L V8 (used 5.1L V8)	29	engine (4hr)
DNF	P +5.0	12	(United Kingdom) Lola Racing (United Kingdom) Team Surtees	(South Africa) Peter de Klerk (United Kingdom) Chris Irwin	Lola T70 Mk.III	Aston Martin 5.0L V8	25	engine (4hr)
DNF	P 1.15	52	(France) S.E.C. Automobiles CD	(France) Dennis Dayan (France) Claude Ballot-Léna	CD SP66	Peugeot 1149cc S4	25	overheating (5hr)
DNF	S 5.0	62	(United Kingdom) JW Automotive Engineering	(United Kingdom) Mike Salmon (United Kingdom) Brian Redman	Ford GT40 Mk.I	Ford 4.7L V8	20	fire (2hr)
DNF	P 1.15	54	(United Kingdom) Roger Nathan Racing Ltd.	(United Kingdom) Roger Nathan (United Kingdom) Mike Beckwith	Costin Nathan GT	Hillman 1.0L I4	15	ignition (5hr)
DNF	P 1.3	50	(United Kingdom) Marcos Racing Ltd.	(United Kingdom) Chris Lawrence (United Kingdom) Jem Marsh	Mini Marcos GT 2+2	BMC 1293cc S4	13	gearbox (3hr)
DNF	P +5.0	11	(United Kingdom) Lola Racing (United Kingdom) Team Surtees	(United Kingdom) John Surtees (United Kingdom) David Hobbs	Lola T70 Mk.III	Aston Martin 5.0L V8	3	piston (1hr)
DNF	GT; 2.0	43	(France) J. Franc (private entrant)	(France) “Franc” (Jacques Dewes) (Germany) Anton ‘Toni’ Fischhaber	Porsche 911 S	Porsche 1991cc F6	2	clutch (1hr)

=== Did Not Start ===
Pos	Class	No	Team	Drivers	Chassis	Engine	Reason
DNS	GT; 5.0	61	(Belgium) Equipe Nationale Belge	(Belgium) Gustave ‘Taf’ Gosselin (Belgium) Hughes de Fierlandt	Ferrari 275 GTB; Competizione	Ferrari 3.3L V12	Did not start
DNP	P +5.0	10	(Italy) Prototipi Bizzarrini	(Switzerland) Edgar Berney (Italy) Giancarlo Naddeo	Bizzarrini P538 GT Strada	Chevrolet 5.4L V8	Failed scrutineering
DNA	GT; 5.0	27	(United States) North American Racing Team	(Mexico) Pedro Rodríguez (Italy) Giancarlo Baghetti	Ferrari 250 LM	Ferrari 3.3L V12	Did not arrive
DNA	P 2.0	31	(Belgium) Equipe Nationale Belge	(Belgium) Gustave ‘Taf’ Gosselin (Belgium) Hughes de Fierlandt	Dino 206 S (Ferrari)	Ferrari 1986cc V6	Withdrawn
DNA	P 2.0	32	(United States) North American Racing Team	(United States) Charlie Kolb	Dino 206 S (Ferrari)	Ferrari 1986cc V6	Withdrawn
DNA	P 2.0	33	(Italy) **SpA Ferrari SEFAC**	(United Kingdom) Jonathon Williams	Dino 206 S (Ferrari)	Ferrari 1986cc V6	Withdrawn
DNA	P 2.0	34	(Italy) Autodelta SpA	(Italy) Andrea de Adamich (Italy) Ignazio Giunti	Alfa Romeo Tipo 33	Alfa Romeo 1995cc V8	Withdrawn
DNA	P 2.0	35	(Italy) Autodelta SpA	(France) Jean Guichet (Italy) Roberto Bussinello	Alfa Romeo Tipo 33	Alfa Romeo 1995cc V8	Withdrawn
DNA	P 2.0	36	(Italy) Autodelta SpA	(Italy) Teodoro Zeccoli (Italy) Nanni Galli	Alfa Romeo Tipo 33	Alfa Romeo 1995cc V8	Withdrawn
DNA	P 1.3	59 (reserve)	(United Kingdom) Marcos Racing Ltd.	(United Kingdom) Chris Lawrence (United Kingdom) Tim Lalonde	Mini Marcos GT 2+2	BMC 1293cc S4	Not required
DNA	P 1.3	68 (reserve)	(France) Jean-Claude Hrubon	(France) Jean ‘Johnny’ Rives (France) Jean-Louis Marnat	Hrubon	Renault 1296xx S4	Did not qualify

=== Class Winners ===
Class	Prototype Winners		Class	Sports Winners		Class	GT Winners	
Prototype >5000	#1 Ford Mk.IV	Gurney / Foyt *	Sports >5000	-		Grand Touring >5000	no finishers	
Prototype 5000	#21 Ferrari 330 P4	Scarfiotti / Parkes *	Sports 5000	no finishers		Grand Touring 5000	#28 Ferrari 275 GTB; Competizione	Spoerry / Steineman
Prototype 2000	#41 Porsche 907 LH	Siffert / Herrmann *	Sports 2000	#37 Porsche 906/6	Pon / Elford	Grand Touring 2000	#42 Porsche 911 S	Buchet / Linge
Prototype 1600	#45 Alpine A210	Bianchi / Vinatier *	Sports 1600	no entrants		Grand Touring 1600	no entrants	
Prototype 1300	#46 Alpine A210	Grandsire / Rosinski *	Sports 1300	no finishers		Grand Touring 1300	no entrants	
Prototype 1150	no finishers		Sports 1150	no entrants		Grand Touring 1150	no entrants	

- Note: setting a new Distance Record.

=== Index of Thermal Efficiency ===
Pos	Class	No	Team	Drivers	Chassis	Score
1	P +5.0	1	(United States) Ford Motor Company (United States) Shelby-American Inc.	(United States) Dan Gurney (United States) A. J. Foyt	Ford Mk IV	1.49
2	P 2.0	41	(Germany) Porsche System Engineering	(Switzerland) Jo Siffert (Germany) Hans Herrmann	Porsche 907 langheck	1.45
3	P 1.3	49	(France) Ecurie Savin-Calberson	(France) André de Cortanze (France) Alain LeGuellec	Alpine A210	1.44
4	P 1.3	48	(France) Ecurie Savin-Calberson	(France) Roger Delageneste (France) Jacques Cheinisse	Alpine A210	1.43
5	P 1.3	46	(France) Société Automobiles Alpine	(France) Henri Grandsire (France) José Rosinski	Alpine A210	1.42
6	P 1.6	45	(France) Société Automobiles Alpine	(Belgium) Mauro Bianchi (France) Jean Vinatier	Alpine A210	1.28
7	P 5.0	21	(Italy) **SpA Ferrari SEFAC**	(Italy) Ludovico Scarfiotti (United Kingdom) Mike Parkes	Ferrari 330 P4	1.27
8	P 5.0	24	(Belgium) Equipe Nationale Belge	(Belgium) Willy Mairesse (Belgium) “Beurlys” (Jean Blaton)	Ferrari 330 P4	1.24
9	P 1.3	51	(United Kingdom) Donald Healey Motor Company	(United Kingdom) Clive Baker (United Kingdom) Andrew Hedges	Austin-Healey Sprite Le Mans	1.21
10	P +5.0	2	(United States) Ford Motor Company (United States) Shelby-American Inc.	(New Zealand) Bruce McLaren (United States) Mark Donohue	Ford Mk IV	1.13

- Note: Only the top ten positions are included in this set of standings.

=== Index of Performance ===
Taken from Moity's book.

Pos	Class	No	Team	Drivers	Chassis	Score
1	P 2.0	41	(Germany) Porsche System Engineering	(Switzerland) Jo Siffert (Germany) Hans Herrmann	Porsche 907 langheck	1.306
2	P 5.0	21	(Italy) **SpA Ferrari SEFAC**	(Italy) Ludovico Scarfiotti (United Kingdom) Mike Parkes	Ferrari 330 P4	1.299
3	P 2.0	38	(Germany) Porsche System Engineering	(Germany) Rolf Stommelen (Germany) Jochen Neerpasch	Porsche 910 kurzheck	1.281
4	P 5.0	24	(Belgium) Equipe Nationale Belge	(Belgium) Willy Mairesse (Belgium) “Beurlys” (Jean Blaton)	Ferrari 330 P4	1.275
5	P +5.0	1	(United States) Ford Motor Company (United States) Shelby-American Inc.	(United States) Dan Gurney (United States) A. J. Foyt	Ford Mk IV	1.270
6	P 1.3	46	(France) Société Automobiles Alpine	(France) Henri Grandsire (France) José Rosinski	Alpine A210	1.269
7	P 1.3	49	(France) Ecurie Savin-Calberson	(France) André de Cortanze (France) Alain LeGuellec	Alpine A210	1.257
8	P 1.3	48	(France) Ecurie Savin-Calberson	(France) Roger Delageneste (France) Jacques Cheinisse	Alpine A210	1.232
9	P 1.6	45	(France) Société Automobiles Alpine	(Belgium) Mauro Bianchi (France) Jean Vinatier	Alpine A210	1.196
10	S 2.0	37	(Germany) Porsche System Engineering	(Netherlands) Ben Pon (United Kingdom) Vic Elford	Porsche 906	1.193

- Note: Only the top ten positions are included in this set of standings. A score of 1.00 means meeting the minimum distance for the car, and a higher score is exceeding the nominal target distance.

=== Statistics ===
Taken from Quentin Spurring's book, officially licensed by the ACO

- Fastest Lap in practice – B.McLaren, #2 Ford Mk IV – 3:24.4secs; 236.08 km/h (146.69 mph)
- Fastest Lap – D.Hulme, #4 Ford Mk IV / M.Andretti #3 Ford Mk IV – 3:23.6secs; 238.01 km/h (147.89 mph)
- Distance – 5,232.90 km (3,251.57 mi)
- Winner's Average Speed – 218.04 km/h (135.48 mph)
- Attendance – 310 000

=== Challenge Mondial de Vitesse et Endurance Standings ===
As calculated after Le Mans, Round 4 of 4

Pos	Manufacturer	Points
1	(West Germany) Porsche	24
2	(United States) Ford	20
3	(Italy) Ferrari	9
4	(Italy) Alfa Romeo	2

Citations
