= Carel Godin de Beaufort =

Dutch racing driver (1934–1964)

Jonkheer Carel Godin de Beaufort
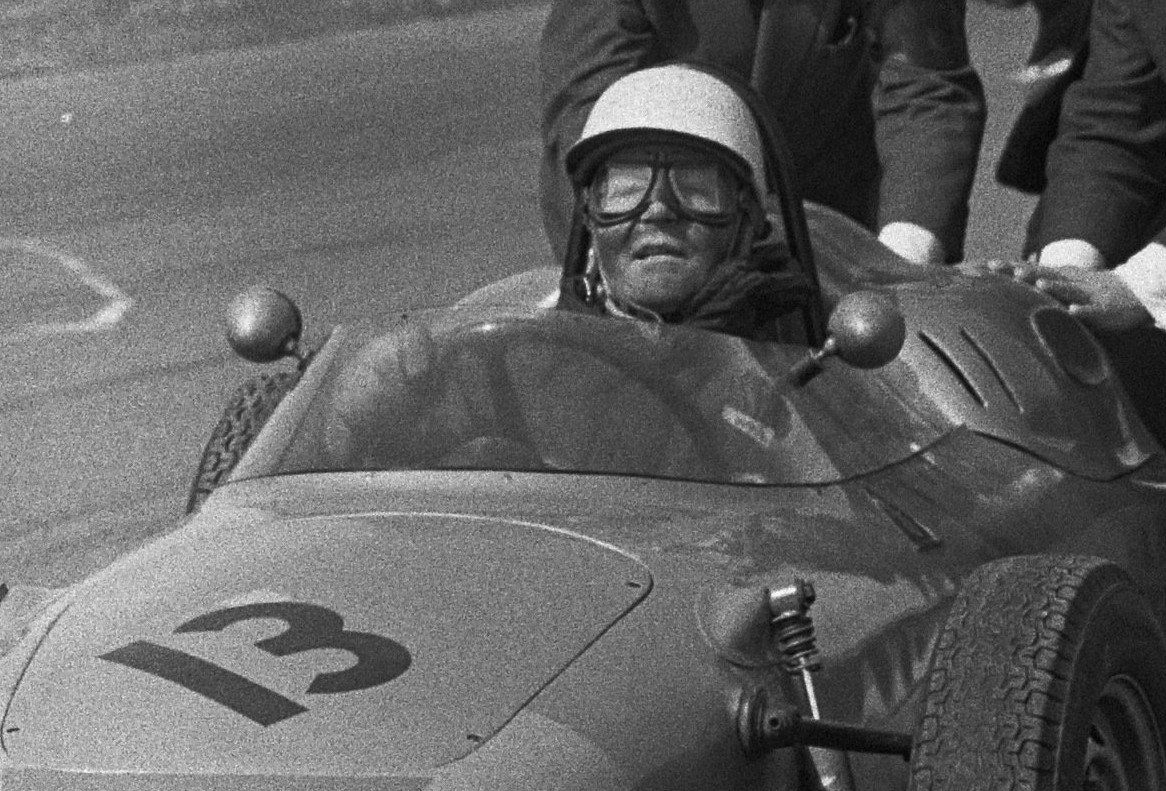
- Godin de Beaufort at the 1962 Dutch Grand Prix
- Born: Karel Pieter Antoni Jan Hubertus Godin de Beaufort; 10 April 1934; Maarsbergen, Utrecht, Netherlands
- Died: 2 August 1964 (aged 30); Cologne, North Rhine-Westphalia, West Germany
- Cause of death: Injuries sustained at the 1964 German Grand Prix

Formula One World Championship career
- Nationality: (Netherlands) Dutch
- Active years: 1958–1964
- Team(s): Maarsbergen, privateer Maserati
- Entries: 29 (27 starts)
- Championships: 0
- Wins: 0
- Podiums: 0
- Career points: 4
- Pole positions: 0
- Fastest laps: 0
- First entry: 1958 Dutch Grand Prix
- Last entry: 1964 German Grand Prix

24 Hours of Le Mans career
- Years: 1956–1960, 1962–1963
- Teams: Porsche
- Best finish: 5th (1958)
- Class wins: 1 (1957)

Karel Pieter Antoni Jan Hubertus "Carel" Godin de Beaufort (10 April 1934 – 2 August 1964) was a Dutch racing driver and nobleman, who competed in Formula One from 1958 to 1964.

Born and raised in Maarsbergen to a noble family, Godin de Beaufort debuted at the 24 Hours of Le Mans in 1956 with Wolfgang Seidel, aged 22. He made his Formula One debut at the 1957 German Grand Prix, (Note: Godin de Beaufort debuted in the Formula One World Championship at the 1957 German Grand Prix in Formula Two machinery.) driving a privateer Porsche RS550 under his Ecurie Maarsbergen banner; he won his class at Le Mans that year. A gentleman driver, he returned at the Dutch and German Grands Prix in 1958—the former marking his first entry in Formula One machinery—amongst finishing fifth overall at Le Mans.

Godin de Beaufort made further intermittent performances in 1959 and 1960, before entering six of eight rounds in 1961, driving his orange Porsche 718. He scored his maiden points with sixth-placed finishes at the Dutch and French Grands Prix in his 1962 campaign, a feat he repeated in Belgium and the United States in 1963; he became the first Dutch driver to score points in Formula One. He scored three podiums in non-championship events that year, at the Syracuse, Rome and Austrian Grands Prix.

During practice for the 1964 German Grand Prix at the Nürburgring, Godin de Beaufort suffered fatal head injuries after losing control of his 718 at the Bergwerk corner. He had entered four further editions of Le Mans between 1959 and 1963, retiring from each.

== Career ==
Godin de Beaufort participated in 31 World Championship Grands Prix, becoming the first Dutchman ever to score points in the Formula One World Championship, and numerous non-Championship Formula One races. He was one of the last amateur drivers in F1, and ran his own cars – painted the vibrant Dutch racing colour: orange – under the Ecurie Maarsbergen banner, the team taking its name from de Beaufort's country estate. In early years he was considered something of a mobile chicane, and a danger to other drivers on the track. However, in later years he matured into a competent and popular competitor.

A longtime Porsche devotee, Godin de Beaufort was a familiar sight at both Championship and non-Championship races in his orange Porsche 718, bought from the Rob Walker Racing Team. Although the 718 was outclassed even in its first year with him, he persisted with it as it was the only design into which he could fit his burly frame. The size of the car, and a streak of self-deprecating humour in de Beaufort himself, earned it the nickname "Fatty Porsche". With stereotypical aristocratic eccentricity he often drove without shoes, and at his final race in Germany was even seen taking practice laps wearing a Beatles wig, rather than his helmet.

== Death ==
Godin de Beaufort was driving the Porsche 718 in practice for the 1964 German Grand Prix at the Nürburgring when the car suddenly veered off the track at the Bergwerk section. The Porsche was barely damaged, but in the era before seat belts, he was thrown out and suffered massive injuries to his head, chest and legs. Initially, De Beaufort was taken to a hospital in Koblenz, but on the following day he was transferred to a major neurological centre in Cologne where he died in the evening.

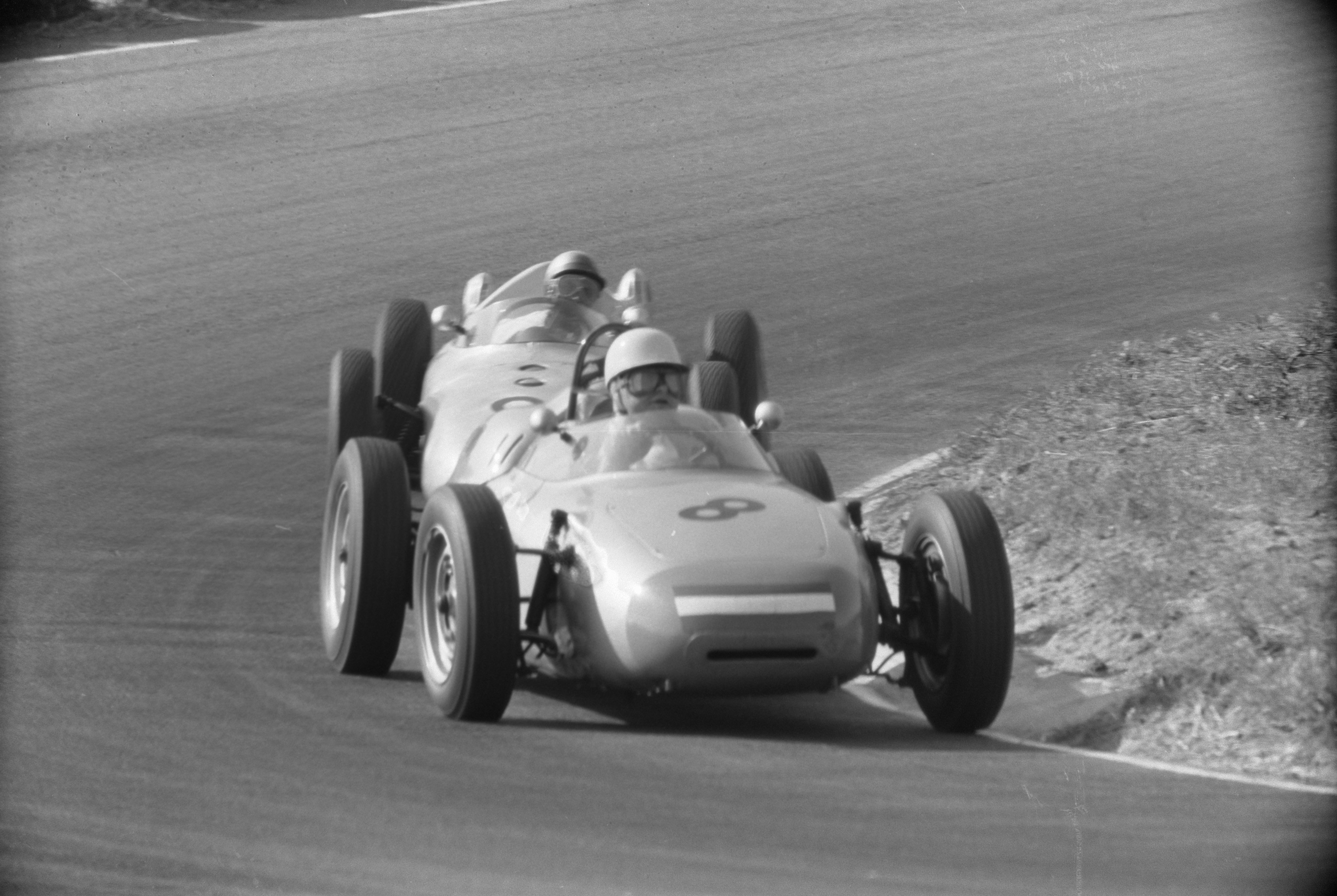
Godin de Beaufort at the 1961 Dutch Grand Prix.

== Racing record ==
=== Complete 24 Hours of Le Mans results ===
Year	Team	Co-Drivers	Car	Class	Laps	Pos.	Class Pos.
1956	(West Germany) Wolfgang Seidel	(Netherlands) Mathieu Hezemans	Porsche 550A/4 RS	S 1.6	48	DNF	DNF
1957	(United States) E. Hugus	(United States) Ed Hugus	Porsche 550A RS	S 1.5	286	8th	**1st**
1958	(Netherlands) Jonkheer Carel Godin de Beaufort	(West Germany) Herbert Linge	Porsche 550 RS	S 1.5	288	5th	**2nd**
1959	(Netherlands) Jonkheer Carel Godin de Beaufort	(Brazil) Christian Heins	Porsche 718 RSK	S 1.5	186	DNF	DNF
1960	(Netherlands) Jonkheer Carel Godin de Beaufort	(United Kingdom) Richard Stoop	Porsche 718 RS 60	S 1.6	180	DNF	DNF
1962	(Germany) Porsche System Engineering	(Netherlands) Ben Pon	Porsche 356B Abarth	GT 1.6	35	DNF	DNF
1963	(Germany) Porsche System Engineering	(Germany) Gerhard Koch	Porsche 356B 2000GS GT	GT 2.0	94	DNF	DNF

=== Complete Formula One World Championship results ===
(key)

Year	Entrant	Chassis	Engine	1	2	3	4	5	6	7	8	9	10	11	WDC	Pts
1957	Ecurie Maarsbergen	Porsche RS550	Porsche 547/3 1.5 F4	ARG	MON	500	FRA	GBR	GER; 14^{1}	PES	ITA				NC	0
1958	Ecurie Maarsbergen	Porsche RSK	Porsche 547/3 1.5 F4	ARG	MON	NED; 11	500	BEL	FRA	GBR					NC	0
1958	Ecurie Maarsbergen	Porsche RS550	Porsche 547/3 1.5 F4								GER; Ret^{1}	POR	ITA	MOR	NC	0
1959	Ecurie Maarsbergen	Porsche RSK	Porsche 547/3 1.5 F4	MON	500	NED; 10									NC	0
1959	Scuderia Ugolini	Maserati 250F	Maserati 250F1 2.5 L6				FRA; 9	GBR	GER	POR	ITA	USA			NC	0
1960	Ecurie Maarsbergen	Cooper T51	Climax FPF 1.5 L4	ARG	MON	500	NED; 8	BEL	FRA	GBR	POR	ITA	USA		NC	0
1961	Ecurie Maarsbergen	Porsche 718	Porsche 547/3 1.5 F4	MON	NED; 14	BEL; 11	FRA; Ret	GBR; 16	GER; 14	ITA; 7	USA				NC	0
1962	Ecurie Maarsbergen	Porsche 718	Porsche 547/3 1.5 F4	NED; 6	MON; DNQ	BEL; 7	FRA; 6	GBR; 14	GER; 13	ITA; 10	USA; Ret	RSA; 11			16th	2
1963	Ecurie Maarsbergen	Porsche 718	Porsche 547/3 1.5 F4	MON	BEL; 6	NED; 9	FRA	GBR; 10	GER; Ret	ITA; DNQ	USA; 6	MEX; 10	RSA; 10		14th	2
1964	Ecurie Maarsbergen	Porsche 718	Porsche 547/3 1.5 F4	MON	NED; Ret	BEL	FRA	GBR	GER; DNS	AUT	ITA	USA	MEX		NC	0

Notes

- **^1** – Formula 2 entry.

=== Complete Formula One non-championship results ===
(key) (Races in bold indicate pole position) (Races in italics indicate fastest lap)

Year	Entrant	Chassis	Engine	1	2	3	4	5	6	7	8	9	10	11	12	13	14	15	16	17	18	19	20	21
1961	Ecurie Maarsbergen	Porsche 718	Porsche 547/3 1.5 F4	LOM	GLV	PAU	BRX	VIE	AIN	SYR	NAP	LON	SIL	SOL; Ret	KAN	DAN; Ret	MOD; DNQ	FLG; 6	OUL	LEW	VAL	RAN	NAT	RSA
1962	Ecurie Maarsbergen	Porsche 718	Porsche 547/3 1.5 F4	CAP	BRX	LOM	LAV	GLV	PAU	AIN	INT	NAP	MAL; 9	CLP	RMS; 7	SOL; 5	KAN; 6	MED	DAN; 7	OUL; 7	MEX; 7	RAN	NAT	
1963	Ecurie Maarsbergen	Porsche 718	Porsche 547/3 1.5 F4	LOM	GLV	PAU; 4	IMO; 6	SYR; 2	AIN	INT; 9	**ROM**; 2	SOL; 7	KAN; 7	MED; DNS	AUT; 3	OUL; 10	RAN							
1964	Ecurie Maarsbergen	Porsche 718	Porsche 547/3 1.5 F4	DMT	NWT	SYR	AIN	INT; 13	SOL; 8	MED	RAN													

== Notes ==
Preceded by Gary Hocking	Formula One fatal accidents 1 August 1964 (date of accident); 2 August 1964 (date of death)	Succeeded by John Taylor
