= 1962 Dutch Grand Prix =

Formula One motor race held in 1962

- Zandvoort original layout

Race details
- Date: May 20, 1962
- Official name: X Grote Prijs van Nederland
- Location: Circuit Park Zandvoort; Zandvoort, Netherlands
- Course: Permanent racing facility
- Course length: 4.193 km (2.605 miles)
- Distance: 80 laps, 335.440 km (208.433 miles)
- Weather: Sunny

Pole position
Driver	(United Kingdom) John Surtees	Lola-Climax
- Time: 1:32.5

Fastest lap
Driver	(New Zealand) Bruce McLaren	Cooper-Climax
- Time: 1:34.4 on lap 5

Podium
First	(United Kingdom) Graham Hill	BRM
Second	(United Kingdom) Trevor Taylor	Lotus-Climax
Third	(United States) Phil Hill	Ferrari

The 1962 Dutch Grand Prix was the eleventh time the Dutch Grand Prix (or Grote Prijs van Nederland) motor race was held. The race also held the honorary designation of the 22nd European Grand Prix. It was run to Formula One regulations on 20 May 1962 as race 1 of 9 in both the 1962 World Championship of Drivers and the 1962 International Cup for Formula One Manufacturers. It was held over 80 laps of the compact 2.6 mile Circuit Park Zandvoort for a race distance of just over 200 miles.

The race was won by British driver Graham Hill driving a BRM P57. It was the first Grand Prix victory for the future dual-World Champion and the second time a BRM driver had won the race after Jo Bonnier in 1959. Hill finished over 27 seconds ahead of Team Lotus driver Trevor Taylor driving a Lotus 24. The reigning World Champion, Ferrari's Phil Hill (Ferrari 156) placed third.

The race indicated the season to come as the long-maligned British Racing Motors organisation was on their way to their first and ultimately only constructor's championship. It also signalled Hill's own rise in the sport, having only stood on the podium once before, at the same circuit two years previously. He would win three more races this year and be crowned World Champion.

== Classification ==
=== Qualifying ===
Pos	No	Driver	Constructor	Qualifying times			Gap
Pos	No	Driver	Constructor	Q1	Q2	Q3	Gap
1	19	(United Kingdom) John Surtees	Lola-Climax	1:37.0	1:35.0	1:32.5	—
2	17	(United Kingdom) Graham Hill	BRM	1:33.3	1:32.6	1:33.4	+0.1
3	4	(United Kingdom) Jim Clark	Lotus-Climax	1:36.1	1:33.6	1:33.2	+0.7
4	8	(Australia) Jack Brabham	Lotus-Climax	No time	1:35.9	1:33.3	+0.8
5	6	(New Zealand) Bruce McLaren	Cooper-Climax	1:44.1	1:35.2	1:33.9	+1.4
6	9	(United Kingdom) Innes Ireland	Lotus-Climax	1:35.4	1:34.1	1:36.4	+1.6
7	18	(United States) Richie Ginther	BRM	1:35.6	1:34.5	1:36.9	+2.0
8	12	(United States) Dan Gurney	Porsche	1:37.1	1:34.7	1:34.9	+2.2
9	1	(United States) Phil Hill	Ferrari	1:36.5	1:35.0	1:35.4	+2.5
10	5	(United Kingdom) Trevor Taylor	Lotus-Climax	1:35.4	No time	1:36.0	+2.9
11	3	(Mexico) Ricardo Rodríguez	Ferrari	1:36.2	1:36.1	1:36.1	+3.6
12	2	(Italy) Giancarlo Baghetti	Ferrari	1:39.3	1:36.3	1:39.3	+3.8
13	11	(Sweden) Jo Bonnier	Porsche	1:38.1	1:37.0	1:37.5	+4.5
14	14	(Netherlands) Carel Godin de Beaufort	Porsche	1:38.6	1:37.4	1:39.8	+4.9
15	7	(South Africa) Tony Maggs	Cooper-Climax	1:38.7	1:37.5	1:41.1	+5.0
16	10	(United States) Masten Gregory	Lotus-Climax	1:38.0	No time	No time	+5.5
17	20	(United Kingdom) Roy Salvadori	Lola-Climax	1:40.2	1:38.8	1:38.9	+6.3
18	15	(Netherlands) Ben Pon	Porsche	1:42.0	1:40.9	1:42.2	+8.4
19	21	(United Kingdom) Jackie Lewis	Cooper-Climax	No time	No time	1:43.2	+10.7
20	16	(Germany) Wolfgang Seidel	Emeryson-Climax	No time	1:50.2	1:46.0	+13.5

=== Race ===
Pos	No	Driver	Constructor	Laps	Time/Retired	Grid	Points
1	17	(United Kingdom) Graham Hill	BRM	80	2:11:02.1	2	9
2	5	(United Kingdom) Trevor Taylor	Lotus-Climax	80	+27.2 secs	10	6
3	1	(United States) Phil Hill	Ferrari	80	+1:21.1	9	4
4	2	(Italy) Giancarlo Baghetti	Ferrari	79	+1 Lap	12	3
5	7	(South Africa) Tony Maggs	Cooper-Climax	78	+2 Laps	15	2
6	14	(Netherlands) Carel Godin de Beaufort	Porsche	76	+4 Laps	14	1
7	11	(Sweden) Jo Bonnier	Porsche	75	+5 Laps	13	
8	21	(United Kingdom) Jackie Lewis	Cooper-Climax	70	+10 Laps	19	
9	4	(United Kingdom) Jim Clark	Lotus-Climax	70	+10 Laps	3	
Ret	3	(Mexico) Ricardo Rodríguez	Ferrari	73	Spun off	11	
Ret	18	(United States) Richie Ginther	BRM	71	Accident	7	
Ret	9	(United Kingdom) Innes Ireland	Lotus-Climax	61	Spun off	6	
Ret	10	(United States) Masten Gregory	Lotus-Climax	54	Halfshaft	16	
NC	16	(Germany) Wolfgang Seidel	Emeryson-Climax	52	Not classified	20	
Ret	12	(United States) Dan Gurney	Porsche	47	Gearbox	8	
Ret	6	(New Zealand) Bruce McLaren	Cooper-Climax	21	Gearbox	5	
Ret	20	(United Kingdom) Roy Salvadori	Lola-Climax	12	Withdrew	17	
Ret	19	(United Kingdom) John Surtees	Lola-Climax	8	Accident	1	
Ret	8	(Australia) Jack Brabham	Lotus-Climax	4	Accident	4	
Ret	15	(Netherlands) Ben Pon	Porsche	2	Spun off	18	
WD	16	(Netherlands) Rob Slotemaker	Porsche		Car not ready - Entry taken by Seidel		
WD	21	(France) Maurice Trintignant	Lotus-Climax		Car not ready - Entry taken by Lewis		

== Notes ==
- This was the Formula One World Championship debut for British manufacturer Lola. Also, it was their very first and only pole position.

== Championship standings after the race ==
Drivers' Championship standings

Pos	Driver	Points
1	(United Kingdom) Graham Hill	9
2	(United Kingdom) Trevor Taylor	6
3	(United States) Phil Hill	4
4	(Italy) Giancarlo Baghetti	3
5	(South Africa) Tony Maggs	2

Constructors' Championship standings

Pos	Constructor	Points
1	(United Kingdom) BRM	9
2	(United Kingdom) Lotus-Climax	6
3	(Italy) Ferrari	4
4	(United Kingdom) Cooper-Climax	2
5	(Germany) Porsche	1

- Notes: Only the top five positions are included for both sets of standings.

Previous race: 1961 United States Grand Prix	FIA Formula One World Championship; 1962 season	Next race: 1962 Monaco Grand Prix
Previous race: 1961 Dutch Grand Prix	Dutch Grand Prix	Next race: 1963 Dutch Grand Prix
Previous race: 1961 German Grand Prix	European Grand Prix (Designated European Grand Prix)	Next race: 1963 Monaco Grand Prix
