= 1962 French Grand Prix =

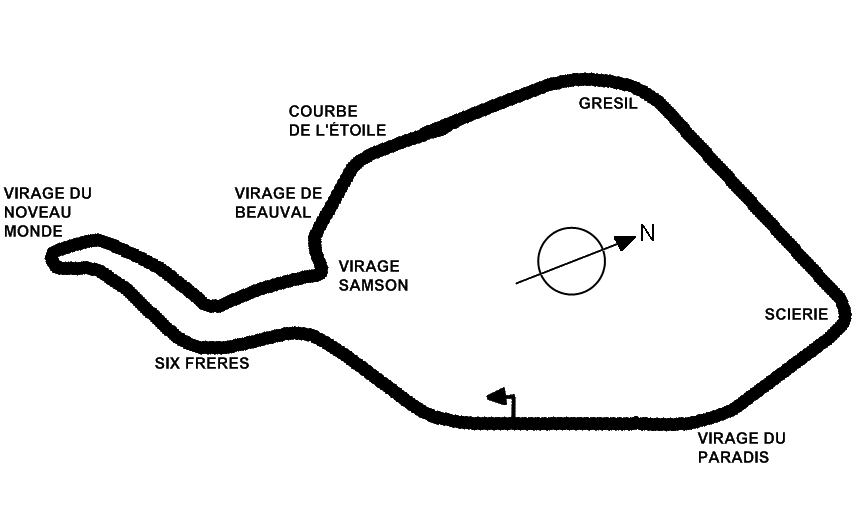

Race details
- Date: 8 July 1962
- Official name: XLVIII Grand Prix de l'A.C.F.
- Location: Rouen-Les-Essarts; Rouen, France
- Course: Temporary road circuit
- Course length: 6.542 km (4.065 miles)
- Distance: 54 laps, 353.268 km (219.511 miles)
- Weather: Sunny

Pole position
Driver	(United Kingdom) Jim Clark	Lotus-Climax
- Time: 2:14.8

Fastest lap
Driver	(United Kingdom) Graham Hill	BRM
- Time: 2:16.9 on lap 32

Podium
First	(United States) Dan Gurney	Porsche
Second	(South Africa) Tony Maggs	Cooper-Climax
Third	(United States) Richie Ginther	BRM

The 1962 French Grand Prix was a Formula One motor race held at Rouen-Les-Essarts on 8 July 1962. It was race 4 of 9 in both the 1962 World Championship of Drivers and the 1962 International Cup for Formula One Manufacturers. The race was won by Dan Gurney, his first Formula One victory, driving a Porsche, that company's only win as a constructor in a Formula One championship race coming after three years of racing. It was the third time that the French Grand Prix was held at Rouen, the previous time being 1957.

== Race ==
Phil Hill, running second in the championship, was in the stands with a camera around his neck; a metalworkers' strike in Italy meant that Ferrari could not take part. This left Graham Hill the fastest on track, taking the lead at the start and also setting a new lap record. The leading pack also included John Surtees (Lola), Jim Clark (Lotus), and Bruce McLaren (Cooper). These four pulled steadily away from Jack Brabham (Lotus) and Dan Gurney (Porsche). After only nine laps Brabham was out of the race with a broken rear suspension, while McLaren lost fourth gear and spun off the track, rejoining the race far down the field. Surtees retired four laps later with ignition problems, but was later back on the track in eighth place. Hill had pulled out a twenty-second lead ahead of Clark, but on the thirtieth lap he made contact with Jackie Lewis' Cooper when lapping him, allowing Clark to pass. Hill gave chase, netting the lap record, and re-took the lead on lap 33. On the next lap, Clark retired with a broken front suspension. Hill and BRM looked sure to win, but on lap 42 he retired in the hairpin with fuel injection and throttle linkage troubles; he lost several laps and ended up in last place after also having stopped in the hairpin to pick up the engine cover that he had left behind during his earlier visit there.

All of a sudden Gurney found himself in the lead, he made no mistakes and gained what was to be Porsche's only Grand Prix victory with their own car. Tony Maggs had second-place handed to him in what was only his second race in a V8 Cooper, while Surtees' Lola kept giving him trouble. With only fourth gear left, he was passed by Richie Ginther on the 43rd lap. Ginther's car had refused to start, setting him a half lap back at the start, but as cars ahead of him all began to break he drove harder and harder. His troubles were not over, however, with five laps left his throttle wire snapped and he had to control it with his hand - rather troublesome since his BRM's gear shifter was also on the right hand side. McLaren was forced to make another pit stop, but managed to get by the troubled Surtees on the last lap. The last points-scoring position went to the ever-steady Carel Godin de Beaufort in his uncompetitive Porsche 718 from 1961.

Other contenders were Jo Bonnier, who had gearbox and engine troubles. He later retired with fuel starvation, but got the car started and was classified as the last finisher, in tenth. Maurice Trintignant had to make a number of pit stops in his Rob Walker Lotus 24. Trevor Taylor had not been able to practice and was taking it comparatively easy when his throttle return spring broke, leaving it fully open. After a pit stop, he finished eighth, six laps down. A rather confusing race ended even worse - Surtees was trying to eke his crippled car into the pits but was hindered by a wall of gendarmes, who were refusing to move. Trintignant moved over to the left, but Taylor arrived at a high speed and rear-ended Trintignant. Both cars ended up in the hay bales, badly damaged, but amazingly no one was injured.

At the end, Phil Hill took his countryman Gurney aside and thanked him for "driving so well for him", as both of his closest competitors ended the race without any points.

== Classification ==
=== Qualifying ===
Pos	No	Driver	Constructor	Qualifying times		Gap
Pos	No	Driver	Constructor	Q1	Q2	Gap
1	12	(United Kingdom) Jim Clark	Lotus-Climax	2:16.7	2:14.8	—
2	8	(United Kingdom) Graham Hill	BRM	2:15.9	2:15.0	+0.2
3	22	(New Zealand) Bruce McLaren	Cooper-Climax	2:52.0	2:15.4	+0.6
4	26	(Australia) Jack Brabham	Lotus-Climax	2:17.5	2:16.1	+1.3
5	18	(United Kingdom) John Surtees	Lola-Climax	2:16.3	2:16.3	+1.5
6	30	(United States) Dan Gurney	Porsche	2:16.5	2:17.1	+1.7
7	34	(United States) Masten Gregory	Lotus-BRM	2:19.4	2:17.3	+2.5
8	36	(United Kingdom) Innes Ireland	Lotus-Climax	2:19.1	2:17.5	+2.7
9	32	(Sweden) Jo Bonnier	Porsche	2:21.1	2:17.9	+3.1
10	10	(United States) Richie Ginther	BRM	2:18.2	2:19.9	+3.4
11	24	(South Africa) Tony Maggs	Cooper-Climax	2:18.6	No time	+3.8
12	14	(United Kingdom) Trevor Taylor	Lotus-Climax	2:19.1	No time	+4.3
13	28	(France) Maurice Trintignant	Lotus-Climax	2:23.1	2:20.8	+6.0
14	20	(United Kingdom) Roy Salvadori	Lola-Climax	2:21.3	No time	+6.5
15	40	(Switzerland) Jo Siffert	Lotus-BRM	2:27.9	2:23.4	+8.6
16	42	(United Kingdom) Jackie Lewis	Cooper-Climax	2:25.5	2:26.5	+10.7
17	38	(Netherlands) Carel Godin de Beaufort	Porsche	2:27.2	2:26.5	+11.7

=== Race ===
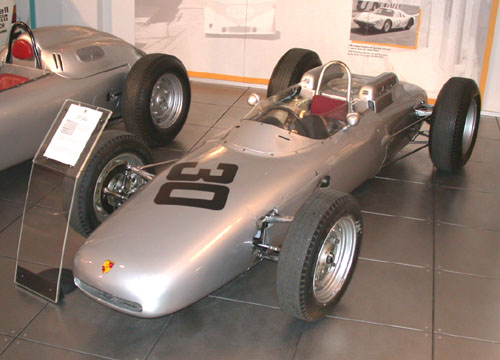
This race was the only victory the Porsche 804 would see

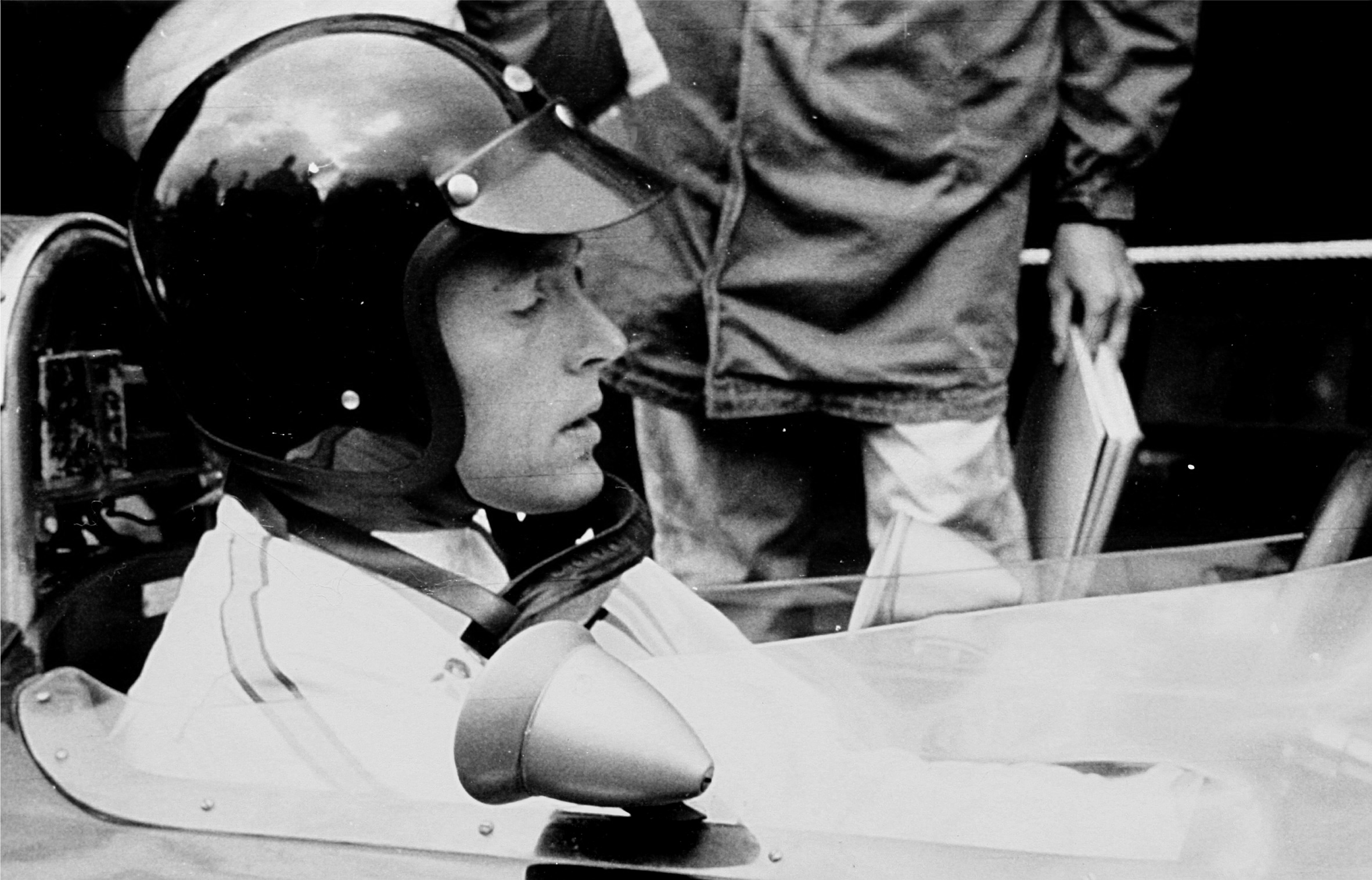
This race was the first win for Dan Gurney in Formula One

Pos	No	Driver	Constructor	Laps	Time/Retired	Grid	Points
1	30	(United States) Dan Gurney	Porsche	54	2:07:05.5	6	9
2	24	(South Africa) Tony Maggs	Cooper-Climax	53	+ 1 Lap	11	6
3	10	(United States) Richie Ginther	BRM	52	+ 2 Laps	10	4
4	22	(New Zealand) Bruce McLaren	Cooper-Climax	51	+ 3 Laps	3	3
5	18	(United Kingdom) John Surtees	Lola-Climax	51	+ 3 Laps	5	2
6	38	(Netherlands) Carel Godin de Beaufort	Porsche	51	+ 3 Laps	17	1
7	28	(France) Maurice Trintignant	Lotus-Climax	50	+ 4 Laps	13	
8	14	(United Kingdom) Trevor Taylor	Lotus-Climax	48	+ 6 laps	12	
9	8	(United Kingdom) Graham Hill	BRM	44	+ 10 Laps	2	
10	32	(Sweden) Jo Bonnier	Porsche	43	Gearbox	9	
Ret	12	(United Kingdom) Jim Clark	Lotus-Climax	34	Suspension	1	
Ret	42	(United Kingdom) Jackie Lewis	Cooper-Climax	28	Accident	16	
Ret	20	(United Kingdom) Roy Salvadori	Lola-Climax	21	Oil Pressure	14	
Ret	34	(United States) Masten Gregory	Lotus-BRM	15	Overheating	7	
Ret	26	(Australia) Jack Brabham	Lotus-Climax	11	Suspension	4	
Ret	40	(Switzerland) Jo Siffert	Lotus-BRM	6	Clutch	15	
Ret	36	(United Kingdom) Innes Ireland	Lotus-Climax	1	Puncture	8	
WD	16	(United Kingdom) Peter Arundell	Lotus		No Car		
WD	-	(United Kingdom) Tony Marsh	BRM		No Car		
WD	-	(United Kingdom) Colin Davis	Porsche				
WD	-	(Italy) Carlo Abate	Lotus-Climax				
WD	-	(United Kingdom) Ian Burgess	Cooper-Climax				

- Scuderia Ferrari withdrew from the event, and their allocated numbers of 2, 4 and 6 were not used. No drivers were named by the team as having been entered.

== Notes ==
- This was the first Formula One World Championship podium for South African driver Tony Maggs, and the first for a South African driver.
- This was the first Formula One World Championship Grand Prix win for Porsche as a constructor and as an engine supplier.

== Championship standings after the race ==
Drivers' Championship standings

	Pos	Driver	Points
	1	(United Kingdom) Graham Hill	16
	2	(United States) Phil Hill	14
1	3	(New Zealand) Bruce McLaren	12
1	4	(United Kingdom) Jim Clark	9
18	5	(United States) Dan Gurney	9

Constructors' Championship standings

	Pos	Constructor	Points
	1	(United Kingdom) BRM	20
2	2	(United Kingdom) Cooper-Climax	17
1	3	(United Kingdom) Lotus-Climax	15
1	4	(Italy) Ferrari	14
1	5	(Germany) Porsche	12

- Notes: Only the top five positions are included for both sets of standings.

Previous race: 1962 Belgian Grand Prix	FIA Formula One World Championship; 1962 season	Next race: 1962 British Grand Prix
Previous race: 1961 French Grand Prix	French Grand Prix	Next race: 1963 French Grand Prix
