= List of Circuit de Spa-Francorchamps fatalities =

Fatal accidents on the Circuit de Spa-Francorchamps, Belgium during national and international motor-sport events on the 15 km (9.3 mi) circuit (1921–1978) and the shortened 7 km (4.3 mi) Grand Prix circuit from 1979 onwards.

== List of fatal accidents involving competitors ==
No	Competitor	Date	Place	Series	Race	Session	Type
1	(United Kingdom) Bill Hollowell	9 Aug 1925	Cheneux / Hollowell Bend		1925 Belgian Grand Prix		350cc AJS
2	(Belgium) Frédéric-Charles Charlier	6 July 1929	Masta Straight	Grand Prix de RAC de Belgique	1929 Spa 24 Hours		Bugatti T43
3	(Belgium) Corneil Lhonneux	4 July 1930	Eau Rouge	Belgian Touring Car Grand Prix	24 Heures de Spa-Francorchamps	Practice	
4	(Germany) Robert Jecker	15 July 1932	Eau Rouge		1932 Belgian Grand Prix	Practice	500cc NSU
5	(Italy) Bruno Quaglieni	15 July 1932	Eau Rouge		1932 Belgian Grand Prix	Practice	250cc Moto Guzzi
6	(Belgium) Emile Miesse	18 June 1933	Hollowell Bend	Belgium Championship Races		Practice	
7	(Belgium) Robert Grégoire	21 July 1933	La Source	European Championship	1933 Belgian Grand Prix	Practice	500cc Saroléa
8	(Netherlands) Arie van der Pluym	15 July 1934	Côte de Burnenville	1934 European Motorcycle Championship	1934 Belgian Grand Prix		500cc Husqvarna
9	(United Kingdom) Richard Seaman	25 June 1939	Clubhouse Corner	1939 European Championship	1939 Belgian Grand Prix		Mercedes-Benz W154
10	(United Kingdom) Richard Stallebrass	11 July 1948	Malmedy		1948 Spa 24 Hours		Aston Martin
11	(Belgium) Edouart Bruylant	17 July 1949	Blanchimont	1949 FIM World Sidecar Championship	1949 Belgian Grand Prix		500cc Norton Sidecar
12	(United Kingdom) Keeth Hurst	17 July 1949	Blanchimont	1949 FIM World Sidecar Championship	1949 Belgian Grand Prix		500cc Norton Sidecar
13	(United Kingdom) David Whitworth	3 July 1950	La Carrière	1950 Grand Prix motorcycle racing season	1950 Belgian Grand Prix		
14	(Australia) Ernie Ring	5 July 1953	Côte de Burnenville	1953 Grand Prix motorcycle racing season	1953 Belgian Grand Prix		500cc AJS
15	(Australia) Gordon Laing	4 July 1954	La Carrière	1954 Grand Prix motorcycle racing season	1954 Belgian Grand Prix		350cc Norton
16	(Belgium) Jacques Van der Haegen	11 May 1957	Burnenville		1957 Grand Prix de Spa	Practice	Fiat Abarth GT
17	(Italy) Roberto Colombo	6 July 1957	Stavelot	FIM World Motorcycle Championship	1957 Belgian Grand Prix	Practice	350cc MV Agusta
18	(United Kingdom) Archie Scott Brown	18 May 1958	Clubhouse corner		1958 Grand Prix de Francorchamps		Lister - Jaguar
19	(United Kingdom) Chris Bristow	19 June 1960	Burnenville	1960 FIA Formula 1 World Championship	1960 Belgian Grand Prix		Cooper - Climax T51
20	(United Kingdom) Alan Stacey	19 June 1960	Masta	1960 FIA Formula 1 World Championship	1960 Belgian Grand Prix		Lotus 18
21	(Italy) Piero Frescobaldi	25 July 1964	Malmedy	1964 European Touring Car Championship	1964 Spa 24 Hours		Lancia Flavia Sport Zagato
22	(United Kingdom) Tony Hegbourne	16 May 1965	Malmedy		1965 500 km de Spa-Francorchamps		Alfa Romeo Giulia TZ
23	(Germany) Karl-Heinz Thiemann	17 June 1967	Masta	1967 Formula Super Vee		Practice	Apal
24	(Netherlands) Wim Loos	23 July 1967	Hollowell Bend	1967 European Touring Car Championship	1967 Spa 24 Hours		Alfa Romeo GTV
25	(Belgium) Eric De Keyn	23 July 1967	Hollowell Bend	1967 European Touring Car Championship	1967 Spa 24 Hours		Alfa Romeo GTA
26	(Germany) Johann Attenberger	7 July 1968	Masta Straight	1968 FIM World Sidecar Championship	1968 Belgian Grand Prix		500cc BMW Sidecar
27	(Germany) Josef Schillinger	7 July 1968	Masta Straight	1968 FIM World Sidecar Championship	1968 Belgian Grand Prix		500cc BMW Sidecar
28	(Belgium) Léon Dernier	26 July 1969	Masta Kink	1969 European Touring Car Championship	1969 Spa 24 Hours		Mazda R100
29	(France) Christian Ravel	4 July 1971	Blanchimont	1971 Grand Prix motorcycle racing season	1971 Belgian Grand Prix		Kawasaki
30	(Belgium) Raymond Mathay	25 July 1971	Les Combes	1971 European Touring Car Championship	1971 Spa 24 Hours		BMW 2800 CS
31	(Germany) Hans-Peter Joisten	21 July 1973	Malmedy	1973 European Touring Car Championship	1973 Spa 24 Hours		BMW 3.0 CSL
32	(France) Roger Dubos	21 July 1973	Malmedy	1973 European Touring Car Championship	1973 Spa 24 Hours		Alfa Romeo GT
33	(Italy) Massimo Larini	21 July 1973	Les Combes	1973 European Touring Car Championship	1973 Spa 24 Hours		Alfa Romeo GTV
34	(Netherlands) Wim Boshuis	26 July 1975	La Carrière	1975 Coupe de L'Avenir	1975 Spa 24 Hours		Opel Commodore GS/E
35	(Belgium) Henri Hanssen	3 June 1978	Raidillon	1978 European Endurance Motorcycle Championship	1978 24 Heures de Liège		Kawasaki
36	(United Kingdom) Kevin Wrettom	7 July 1984	Blanchimont	1984 Grand Prix motorcycle racing season	1984 Belgian Grand Prix		Suzuki RGB500
37	(Germany) Harald Layher	18 July 1985	Blanchimont	1985 World Endurance Motorcycle Championship	1985 24 Hours of Liège	Practice	Suzuki GSX-R750
38	(France) Jean-Pierre Haemisch	18 July 1985	Blanchimont	1985 World Endurance Motorcycle Championship	1985 24 Hours of Liège		
39	(Germany) Stefan Bellof	1 Sep 1985	Raidillon	1985 World Endurance Championship	1985 1000 km of Spa Francorchamps		Porsche 956
40	(Belgium) Guy Renard	22 July 1990	Raidillon	1990 European Touring Car Championship	1990 Spa 24 Hours		Toyota Corolla GT
41	(United Kingdom) Ian Taylor	7 June 1992	Kemmel Straight	Dunlop Rover Challenge	1992 Coupe de Spa		Rover 216 GTI
42	(Italy) Bruno Bonini	4 July 1994	Eau Rouge		1994 Spa-Francorchamps 6 Hours	Practice	Alfa Romeo Giulia GTA
43	(Netherlands) Jan ter Maat	23 Sep 1995	Eau Rouge		Battle of the Twins	Practice	
44	(United Kingdom) Lee Pullan	14 July 1996	Blanchimont	1996 World Endurance Motorcycle Championship	1996 24 Hours of Liège		Kawasaki ZXR-750
45	(Belgium) Luc Van Haver	8 July 1999	Blanchimont	1996 World Endurance Motorcycle Championship	1999 24 Hours of Liège	Practice	Aprilia RSV Mille
46	(Italy) Ferruccio Leone	9 May 2004	Pouhon	2004 Historic F3 Championship	2004 Spa RMU Classic Formula 3		Arno AR1- Alfa Romeo
47	(Belgium) Adrien Nicolas	16 August 2008	Eau Rouge	Biker's Cup	2008 8 Heures de Spa		Kawasaki Ninja ZX-6R
48	(Denmark) Henrik René Olesen	1 July 2011	Les Combes	Bikers' Classic	4 Hours of Spa Classic 2011	Practice	Moto Guzzi 850 Le Mans
49	(France) Sébastien Clouzeau	16 June 2013	Raidillon	Classic F3 Race	2013 Spa Summer Classic		Martini MK42 F3
50	(Switzerland) Unknown	5 May 2014	Raidillon			Track day	Opel Speedster
51	(Belgium) Dave Dockx	11 August 2018	Blanchimont		6 Heures Moto Spa-Francorchamps 2018		BMW S1000RR
52	(France) Anthoine Hubert	31 August 2019	Raidillon	2019 FIA Formula 2 Championship	2019 Spa-Francorchamps Formula 2 round	Race	Dallara F2 2018
53	(France) Olivier Parigi	21 May 2023	Speaker Corner	VW Fun Cup	2023 Franco Fun Festival	Race	Volkswagen Beetle
54	(Belgium) Unknown	9 June 2023		Bikers' Days		Trackday	
55	(Netherlands) Dilano van 't Hoff	1 July 2023	Kemmel Straight	2023 Formula Regional European Championship	2023 24 Hours of Spa support event (FRECA)	Race 2	Tatuus F3-T318
56	(Germany) Günther Knuppertz	13 August 2023	Old Starting Grid	Historics motorcycles and sidecars	2023 Bikers Festival Classic	Exhibition run	Aprilia RSV4 1000

== List of fatal accidents involving race officials ==
No	Official	Date	Place	Series	Race	Session	Role
1	(Belgium) Léon Grisard	23 July 1972	Masta Straight	1972 European Touring Car Championship	1972 Spa 24 Hours		Marshal
2	(Belgium) Michel Wilmet	26 July 1975	Blanchimont	1975 Coupe de L'Avenir	1975 Spa 24 Hours		Marshal
3	(Belgium) Jacky Bouillon	12 Sep 1987	Blanchimont	1987 World Sportscar Championship	1987 1000 km of Spa	Practice	Marshal
4	(Belgium) Charles Albert	14 July 1996	Blanchimont	1996 World Endurance Motorcycle Championship	1996 Spa 24 Hours		Marshal

== List of fatal accidents involving spectators ==
No	Name	Date	Place	Series	Race	Session	Role
1	(Belgium) Joeséphine Marquet	20 July 1922	Burnenville	Belgian motorcycle Grand Prix	1922 Belgian Grand Prix	Practice	Bypasser
2	(Belgium) Joseph Schmit	6 July 1929	Masta Straight	Grand Prix de RAC de Belgique	1929 Spa 24 Hours	Race	Gendarme
3	(Belgium) Philippe Stainier	26 July 1953	Malmedy	FIA World Sports Car Championship	1953 Spa 24 Hours	Race	Spectator
4	(Belgium) Jean Hoedemaekers	17 May 1964	Masta Kink	Coupes de Spa	500 Km de Spa-Francorchamps support event	Race	Spectator
