= 1968 Deutschland Trophäe =

1968 II Deutschland Trophäe
- 1st race in the 1968 European Formula Two season

Race details
- Date: 7 April 1968
- Official name: II Deutschland Trophäe; Martini Gold Cup
- Location: Hockenheimring
- Course: Permanent racing facility
- Course length: 6.786 km (4.217 miles)
- Distance: 2 x 20 laps, 270.71 km (168.21 miles)
- Weather: Wet

Pole position
| Driver | (France) Jean-Pierre Beltoise | Matra |
- Time: 1:59.3

Fastest lap
| Driver | (France) Henri Pescarolo | Matra |
- Time: 2:00.1

Podium
| First | (France) Jean-Pierre Beltoise | Matra |
| Second | (France) Henri Pescarolo | Matra |
| Third | (United Kingdom) Piers Courage | Williams |

The 1968 Deutschland Trophäe, also known as the Martini Gold Cup, was a motor race, run to Formula Two rules, held on 7 April 1968 at the Hockenheimring, Germany. The race was run over two heats of 20 laps of the circuit, and was the first round of the 1968 European Formula Two season. During the first heat, British driver and double Formula One World Champion Jim Clark suffered a fatal accident.

Clark had also been asked to race at Brands Hatch by Ford, who wanted him to drive their new sports car, but Clark had already agreed to race for his Team Lotus boss, Colin Chapman at Hockenheim.

== Heat one ==
It had rained before the first heat, rendering visibility very poor. Max Mosley, later President of the FIA, was driving his Brabham in the race. He described the difficult racing conditions: "The first corner was thick spray. I was thinking, 'this isn't a good idea'. All you could do was steer by looking at the tops of the trees, because you couldn't see where the track went."

The first incident was when Walter Habegger crashed his Lotus 41 into an earth bank on lap four. On lap five, on a gentle curve just after the first corner, Clark was running eighth when he spun off the track into the dense trees lining the circuit, and he died almost instantly. A flag marshal's eye-witness report stated that the car had lost grip at the rear and Clark had tried to correct the slides a number of times before hitting the trees. Amid the many conflicting rumours concerning why the car left the track, Clark's mechanic, Dave Sims, blamed a right rear tyre deflation for the accident, and the official accident investigation report concurred, concluding that the most likely explanation was that the right rear tyre had explosively deflated after picking up a slow puncture. Colin Chapman, who was not present at Hockenheim that day, suggested that Clark may have picked up debris from an accident during the previous day's practice session, in which Habegger had also crashed.

However, Lotus had been experiencing problems with the Lotus 48 cars due to the cold, wet weather at Hockenheim. Sims said afterwards, "The problem was, it was freezing. It was so cold it was affecting the fuel metering units. The drive belts were breaking."

Williams driver Derek Bell suspected the engine misfiring problems that had plagued Clark's car all weekend. Sims had confirmed to Bell that the engine issues had not been resolved before the race, and Bell later said, "I could see it: he goes through that curve, the engine cuts out, the thing gets itself sideways as a result, the engine suddenly cuts back in when he's out of shape... who knows?"

Lola driver Chris Irwin was following around 250 yards behind Clark when the accident happened. "Suddenly Jim's car broke out," he said. "It looked like something mechanical."

Jean-Pierre Beltoise narrowly won the heat from team-mate Henri Pescarolo with Chris Lambert in third.

== Heat two ==
Clark's team-mate Graham Hill was withdrawn from the second heat, as was Robert Lamplough. Beltoise won again, this time with Piers Courage in second with Pescarolo third.

== Aggregate results ==
| Pos | No. | Driver | Entrant | Constructor |
|---|---|---|---|---|
| 1 | 11 | (France) Jean-Pierre Beltoise | Matra Sports | Matra-Cosworth |
| 2 | 12 | (France) Henri Pescarolo | Matra Sports | Matra-Cosworth |
| 3 | 8 | (United Kingdom) Piers Courage | Frank Williams Racing Cars | Brabham-Cosworth |
| 4 | 20 | (United Kingdom) Chris Lambert | London Racing Team | Brabham-Cosworth |
| 5 | 3 | (New Zealand) Chris Amon | Ferrari Automobili | Ferrari |
| 6 | 18 | (France) Jo Schlesser | Ecurie Intersport SA | McLaren-Cosworth |
| 7 | 16 | (United Kingdom) Robin Widdows | McLaren Racing Team | McLaren-Cosworth |
| 8 | 7 | (United Kingdom) Chris Irwin | Lola Racing Ltd. | Lola-Cosworth |
| 9 | 21 | (United Kingdom) Max Mosley | London Racing Team | Brabham-Cosworth |
| 10 | 19 | (Switzerland) Xavier Perrot | Squadra Tartaruga | Brabham-Cosworth |

not classified

| 11 | 10 | (United Kingdom) Derek Bell | Frank Williams Racing Cars | Brabham-Cosworth |
| 12 | 24 | (United Kingdom) Peter Gethin | Frank Lythgoe Racing | Chevron-Cosworth |
| 13 | 15 | (New Zealand) Graeme Lawrence | McLaren Racing Team | McLaren-Cosworth |
| 14 | 17 | (France) Guy Ligier | Ecurie Intersport SA | McLaren-Cosworth |
| 15 | 25 | (Switzerland) Walter Habegger | Walter Habegger | Lotus-Cosworth |
| 16 | 2 | (United Kingdom) Graham Hill | Gold Leaf Team Lotus | Lotus-Cosworth |
| 17 | 29 | (United Kingdom) Robert Lamplough | Robert Lamplough | McLaren-Cosworth |
| 18 | 6 | (Germany) Kurt Ahrens Jr. | Kurt Ahrens Jr. | Brabham-Cosworth |
| 19 | 26 | (Italy) Carlo Facetti | Tecno Racing Team | Tecno-Cosworth |
| 20 | 1 | (United Kingdom) Jim Clark | Gold Leaf Team Lotus | Lotus-Cosworth |
| DNS | 9 | (Sweden) Picko Troberg | Frank Williams Racing Cars | Brabham-Cosworth |
| DNS | 28 | (Switzerland) Bruno Frey | Midland Racing Team | Lotus-Cosworth |
| DNA | 4 | (United Kingdom) John Surtees | Lola Racing Ltd. | Lola-Cosworth |
| DNA | 22 | (Spain) Jorge de Bagration | Escuderia Nacional CS | Lola-Cosworth |
| DNA | 23 | (Spain) Alex Soler-Roig | Escuderia Nacional CS | Lola-Cosworth |
| DNA | 27 | (Switzerland) Clay Regazzoni | Tecno Racing Team | Tecno-Cosworth |

- Frey's car was used in both heats by Walter Habegger
- A third Matra was on the entry list, given #14, but no driver was assigned to it and it did not run.

| Heat one | | | | Heat two | | | |
| Pos | Driver | Constructor | Time/retired | Pos | Driver | Constructor | Time/retired |
| 1 | Beltoise | Matra | 44:54.6 | 1 | Beltoise | Matra | 40:55.1 |
| 2 | Pescarolo | Matra | + 1.3 s | 2 | Courage | Brabham | + 0.3 s |
| 3 | Lambert | Brabham | + 42.7 s | 3 | Pescarolo | Matra | + 0.8 s |
| 4 | Bell | Brabham | + 54.2 s | 4 | Widdows | McLaren | + 40.4 s |
| 5 | Courage | Brabham | + 1:01.9 s | 5 | Lambert | Brabham | + 40.6 s |
| 6 | Amon | Ferrari | + 1:59.4 s | 6 | Schlesser | McLaren | + 40.8 s |
| 7 | Schlesser | McLaren | + 2:00.1 | 7 | Amon | Ferrari | + 41.2 s |
| 8 | Irwin | Lola | + 2:06.4 | 8 | Irwin | Lola | + 41.6 s |
| 9 | Ligier | McLaren | + 2:15.9 | 9 | Mosley | Brabham | 19 laps |
| 10 | Widdows | McLaren | 19 laps | 10 | Perrot | Brabham | 19 laps |
| 11 | Mosley | Brabham | 19 laps | 11 | Habegger | Lotus | 18 laps |
| 12 | Hill | Lotus | 19 laps | Ret | Bell | Brabham | 9 laps (Clutch) |
| 13 | Lamplough | McLaren | 19 laps | Ret | Gethin | Chevron | 8 laps (Exhaust) |
| 14 | Lawrence | McLaren | 18 laps | Ret | Lawrence | McLaren | 4 laps (Overheating) |
| 15 | Gethin | Chevron | 18 laps | Ret | Ligier | McLaren | 1 lap (Gearbox) |
| Ret | Perrot | Brabham | 17 laps | DNS | Ahrens | Brabham | |
| Ret | Ahrens | Brabham | 12 laps (Camshaft) | DNS | Clark | Lotus | |
| Ret | Facetti | Tecno | 5 laps (Engine) | DNS | Facetti | Tecno | |
| Ret | Clark | Lotus | 4 laps (Fatal accident) | DNS | Hill | Lotus | Withdrawn |
| Ret | Habegger | Lotus | 3 laps (Accident) | DNS | Lamplough | McLaren | Withdrawn |
