= Lotus 44 =

Formula 2 racing car

The Lotus 44 was an open-wheel Formula 2 racing car, designed, developed and built by the British motorsport team and constructor Lotus. It was powered by the 997 cc (60.8 cu in) Ford-Cosworth SCA four-cylinder engine.

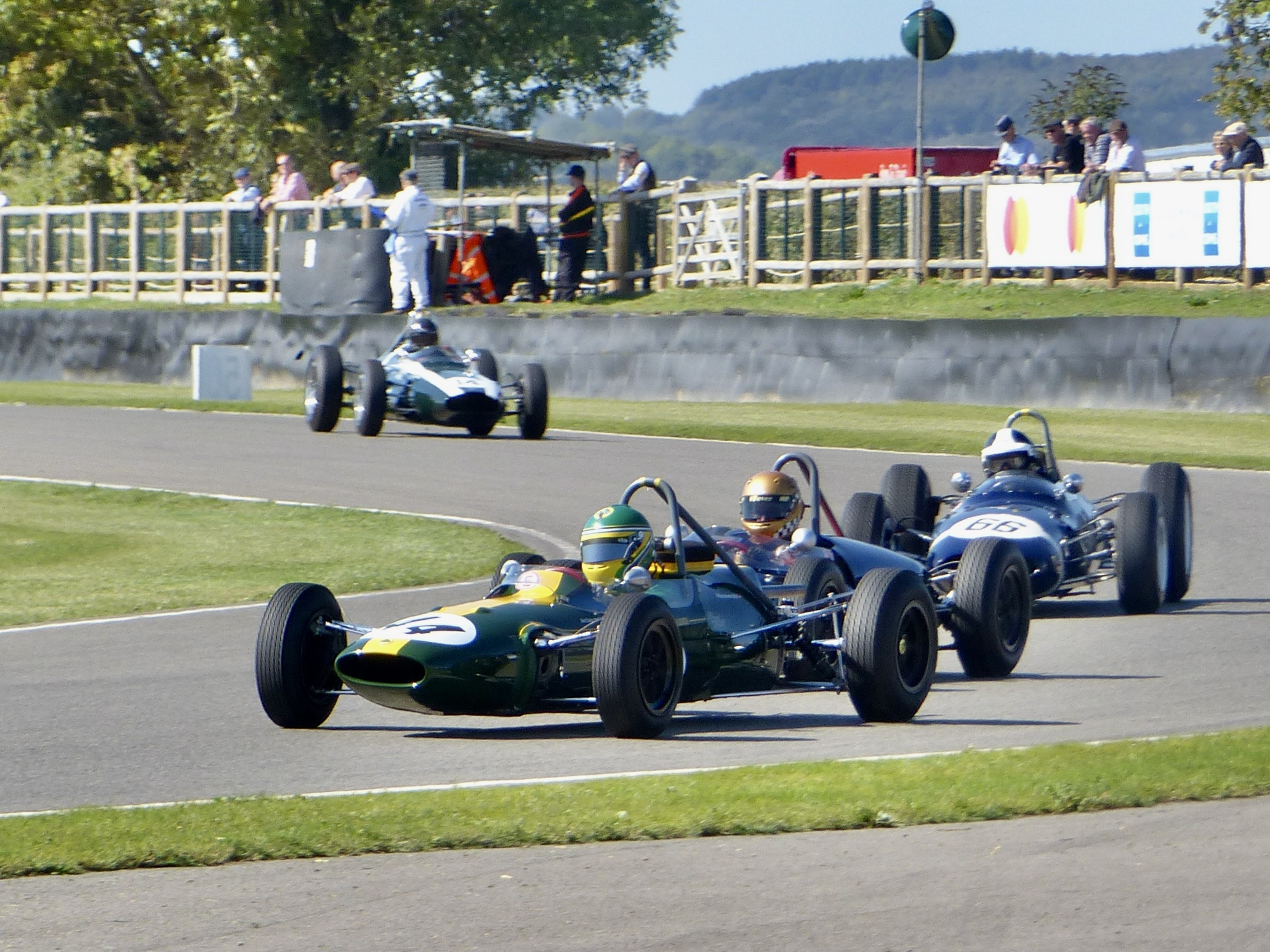
Philipp Buhofer in a Lotus 44, 2019 Goodwood Revival

The Lotus 44 was manufactured in 1966 on the basis of the 1965 Lotus 35. The car got the wide suspension of the Lotus 41, which was successfully used in Formula 3 in the same year. The cars were fitted with Cosworth engines, but these were clearly inferior to the Honda powerplants used in Brabham's Formula 2 cars.

The Ron Harris team entered three 44s in Formula 2 in 1966. Jim Clark and Peter Arundell were only able to achieve partial success with the car.

Team Lotus entered two cars in the F2 section of the 1966 German GP for Pedro Rodriquez (#31) and Piers Courage (#32), and the Ron Harris team entered a 44 for Gerhard Mitter (#30).

The victory was not possible and in 1967 a new car, the Lotus 48, entered the newly created Formula 2 European Championship with the Lotus.

== Formula One World Championship results ==
(key)

| Year | Entrant | Engine | Tyres | Drivers | 1 | 2 | 3 | 4 | 5 | 6 | 7 | 8 | 9 | Points | WCC |
|---|---|---|---|---|---|---|---|---|---|---|---|---|---|---|---|
| 1966 | Ron Harris Team Lotus | Cosworth SCA 1.0 L4 | D | | MON | BEL | FRA | GBR | NED | GER | ITA | USA | MEX | —N/a | |
| 1966 | Ron Harris Team Lotus | Cosworth SCA 1.0 L4 | D | Gerhard Mitter | | | | | | DNS | | | | —N/a | |
| 1966 | Ron Harris Team Lotus | Cosworth SCA 1.0 L4 | D | Pedro Rodríguez | | | | | | Ret | | | | —N/a | |
| 1966 | Ron Harris Team Lotus | Cosworth SCA 1.0 L4 | D | Piers Courage | | | | | | Ret | | | | —N/a | |
