= Jim Clark =

British racing driver (1936–1968)

Jim Clark OBE
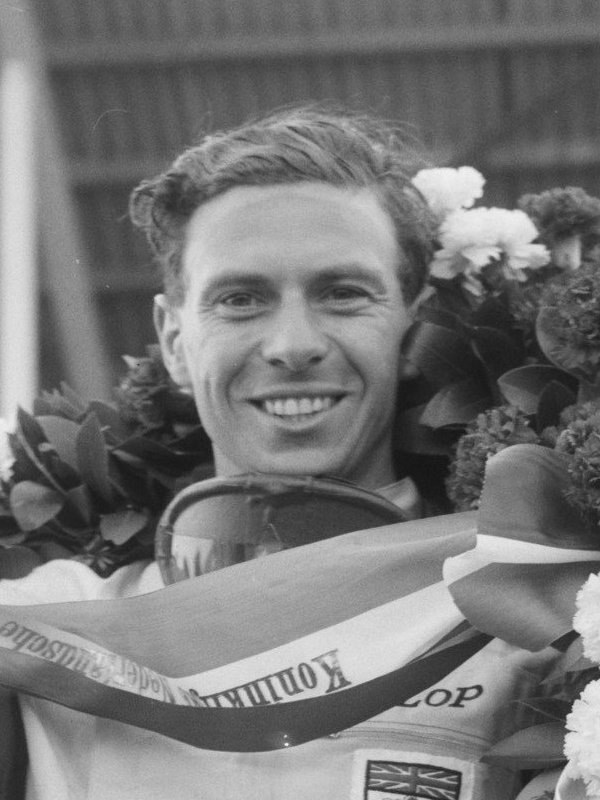
- Clark at the 1963 Dutch Grand Prix
- Born: James Clark; 4 March 1936; Kilmany, Fife, Scotland
- Died: 7 April 1968 (aged 32); Hockenheim, Baden-Württemberg, West Germany
- Cause of death: Injuries sustained at the 1968 Deutschland Trophäe

Formula One World Championship career
- Nationality: (United Kingdom) British
- Active years: 1960–1968
- Team: Lotus
- Entries: 73 (72 starts)
- Championships: 2 (1963, 1965)
- Wins: 25
- Podiums: 32
- Career points: 255 (274) (Note: Up until 1990, not all points scored by a driver contributed to their final World Championship tally (see list of points scoring systems for more information). Numbers without parentheses are Championship points; numbers in parentheses are total points scored.)
- Pole positions: 33
- Fastest laps: 28
- First entry: 1960 Dutch Grand Prix
- First win: 1962 Belgian Grand Prix
- Last win: 1968 South African Grand Prix
- Last entry: 1968 South African Grand Prix

Tasman Series career
- Years active: 1965–1968
- Teams: Lotus
- Starts: 32
- Championships: 3 (1965, 1967, 1968)
- Wins: 15
- Podiums: 23
- Poles: 12
- Fastest laps: 11

Champ Car career
- 9 races run over 5 years
- Best finish: 6th (1963)
- First race: 1963 Indianapolis 500 (Indianapolis)
- Last race: 1967 Rex Mays 300 (Riverside)
- First win: 1963 Tony Bettenhausen 200 (Milwaukee)
- Last win: 1965 Indianapolis 500 (Indianapolis)
Wins	Podiums	Poles
2	4	3

24 Hours of Le Mans career
- Years: 1959–1961
- Teams: Border Reivers
- Best finish: 3rd (1960)
- Class wins: 0

James Clark (4 March 1936 – 7 April 1968) was a British racing driver from Scotland who competed in Formula One from 1960 to 1968. Clark won two Formula One World Drivers' Championship titles, which he won in 1963 and 1965 with Lotus, and—at the time of his death—held the records for most wins (25), pole positions (33), and fastest laps (28), among others. In American open-wheel racing, Clark won the Indianapolis 500 in 1965 with Lotus, becoming the first non-American winner of the race in 49 years.

Born in Fife and raised in the Scottish Borders, Clark started his racing career in road rallying and hillclimbing. By 1958, Clark had graduated to sports car racing in national competition with Border Reivers, racing the Jaguar D-Type and Porsche 356, where he attracted the attention of Lotus founder Colin Chapman. Driving a Lotus Elite, Clark finished second-in-class at the 24 Hours of Le Mans in 1959. Clark made his formula racing debut the following year in Formula Junior, winning the championship ahead of reigning seven-time Grand Prix motorcycle racing World Champion John Surtees. After immediately impressing in Formula Two, Clark was promoted to Formula One with Lotus for the remainder of the 1960 season alongside Surtees and Innes Ireland, making his debut at the Dutch Grand Prix and scoring his maiden podium four races later in Portugal; Clark finished third overall at Le Mans that year.

Following multiple further podiums in 1961, Lotus fielded the highly-successful 25 chassis from 1962 onwards. Clark took his maiden win at the 1962 Belgian Grand Prix, achieving further wins at his home Grand Prix in Great Britain and in the United States, as he finished runner-up to career rival Graham Hill. After winning a then-record seven Grands Prix during his 1963 campaign, Clark won his maiden title, earning widespread acclaim for his performances. Despite winning the most races the following season, reliability issues with the Lotus 33 saw him fall to third in the standings. However, the same chassis would see Clark win again in 1965, as he took six victories in that season. Lotus then struggled to adapt to the 3-litre engine era, with Clark only able to win the United States Grand Prix during his second title defence. 1967 was more successful for Lotus under Cosworth power, with Clark taking four wins throughout the season.

While leading the 1968 World Drivers' Championship, Clark died as a result of an accident during a Formula Two race at the Hockenheimring. Clark held the Formula One records for the most race wins until 1973, pole positions until 1989, and fastest laps also until 1989. He still holds several records in 2025, including the most grand slams (8). A versatile driver, Clark found success outside of formula racing in sports cars, touring cars, and American open-wheel racing. Clark was a champion in the British Saloon Car Championship, winning every race he entered in 1964, as well as in French and British Formula Two. He was a three-time champion of the Tasman Series, winning in 1965, 1967 and 1968, with a record 15 wins in 32 starts. In rallying, he entered the Rally of Great Britain in 1966. His successes in 1965—winning championships in Formula One, the Tasman Series, French Formula Two, and British Formula Two—make him the only driver in history to have won multiple championships in a single season alongside a World Drivers' Championship. Clark was inducted into the International Motorsports Hall of Fame in 1990.

== Early years ==
James Clark was born into a farming family at Kilmany House Farm, Fife, the youngest child of five, and the only boy. In 1942, the family moved to Edington Mains Farm, near Duns, Berwickshire, in the Borders. He was educated at primary schools in Kilmany and then in Chirnside. Following three years of preparatory schooling at Clifton Hall School in Edinburgh he was sent to Loretto School in Musselburgh, East Lothian.

Although his parents were opposed to the idea, Clark started his racing in local road rally and hill climb events driving his own Sunbeam-Talbot, and proved a fearsome competitor right from the start. On 16 June 1956, in his first event, he was behind the wheel of a DKW sonderklasse at Crimond, Scotland. By 1958, Clark was driving for the local Border Reivers team for Ian Scott-Watson, racing Jaguar D-Types and Porsches in national events, and winning 18 races. On Boxing Day 1958, Clark raced against the man who would launch him to superstardom. Driving a Lotus Elite, he finished second to Colin Chapman in a ten-lap grand touring race at Brands Hatch.

Driving a Lotus Elite, Clark finished tenth at the 1959 24 Hours of Le Mans; he partnered with John Whitmore and the ex-Bruce Halford Lister Jaguar, winning the Bo'ness Hill Climb. Chapman was sufficiently impressed to give Clark a ride in one of his Formula Junior (FJ) cars. In March 1960, the first race for the newly introduced FJ took place at Goodwood. Clark finished first ahead of John Surtees and Trevor Taylor. Clark had made an earlier FJ appearance in a one-off race at Brands Hatch on Boxing Day, 1959, driving a Gemini-B.M.C. for Graham Warner of the Chequered Flag garage, Chiswick.

== Clark and Lotus ==
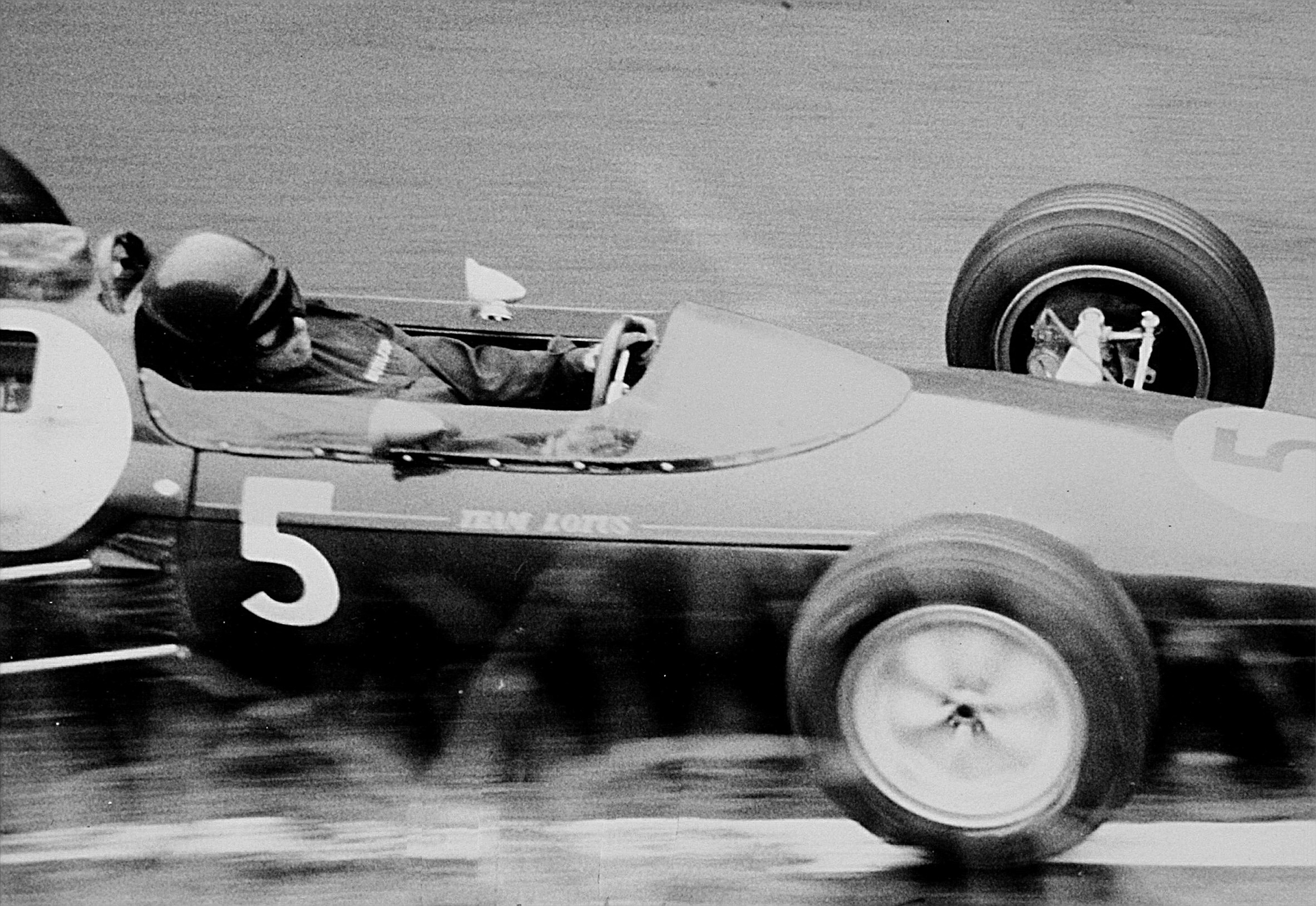
Clark at the 1962 German Grand Prix

Clark made his Formula One (F1) Grand Prix debut, part-way through the 1960 season, during the 1960 Dutch Grand Prix at Zandvoort on 6 June. Lotus had lost Surtees, who took part to the Isle of Man TT series; alongside Innes Ireland and Alan Stacey, Clark was one of the substitutes deemed acceptable. He retired on lap 49 with final drive failure. His second Formula One race was the 1960 Belgian Grand Prix, held at the Spa-Francorchamps circuit, where he finished fifth and scored his first points finish.

In the 1961 Italian Grand Prix on 10 September at Monza, Wolfgang von Trips in his Ferrari collided with Clark's Lotus. Von Trips's car became airborne and crashed into a side barrier, fatally throwing von Trips out of the car and killing fifteen spectators. Clark and his car were subjected to an investigation; he was initially accused of manslaughter, before the charges were dropped.

At the time, Clark described the accident by saying: "Von Trips and I were racing along the straightaway and were nearing one of the banked curves, the one on the southern end. We were about 100 metres from the beginning of the curve. Von Trips was running close to the inside of the track. I was closely following him, keeping near the outside. At one point von Trips shifted sideways so that my front wheels collided with his back wheels. It was the fatal moment. Von Trips's car spun twice and went into the guardrail along the inside of the track. Then it bounced back, struck my own car and bounced down into the crowd." In his later testimony, he recalled the collision had become unavoidable, saying: "Trips was head of me, driving on the center of the track. Suddenly he slowed down. Since my Lotus was faster than the Ferrari, I tried to overtake him. In the same instant the Ferrari surprisingly pulled to the left, and a collision became unavoidable..."

Clark's first Drivers' World Championship came driving the Lotus 25 in 1963, winning seven out of the ten races and Lotus its first Constructors' World Championship. The 1963 Indianapolis 500 saw Clark's debut in the series; he finished in second position behind Parnelli Jones and won Indianapolis 500 Rookie of the Year honours. The 1963 Indy 500 result remains controversial. Before the race, United States Auto Club (USAC) officials had told the drivers that they would black flag any car that was seen to be leaking oil onto the track. Late in the race, Jones' front-engined roadster developed a crack in the oil tank and began to leak oil. With the track surface already being slippery this resulted in a number of cars spinning and led to popular driver Eddie Sachs crashing into the outside wall. USAC officials were set to black flag Jones after the Sachs crash until his car owner J. C. Agajanian ran down pit lane and somehow convinced them that the oil leak was below the level of a known crack and would not leak any further. Colin Chapman later accused USAC officials of being biased because Clark and Lotus were a British team with a rear-engine car. Many, including journalist and author Brock Yates, believed that had it been an American driver and car in second place instead of Clark in the British built Lotus, officials would have black flagged Jones. Despite this, neither Lotus nor their engine supplier Ford protested the result, reasoning that winning as a result of a disqualification when Jones had led for 167 of the races 200 laps (Clark led for 28 laps) and had set the lap record speed of 151.541 mph (243.9 km/h) on lap 114, would not be well received by the public.

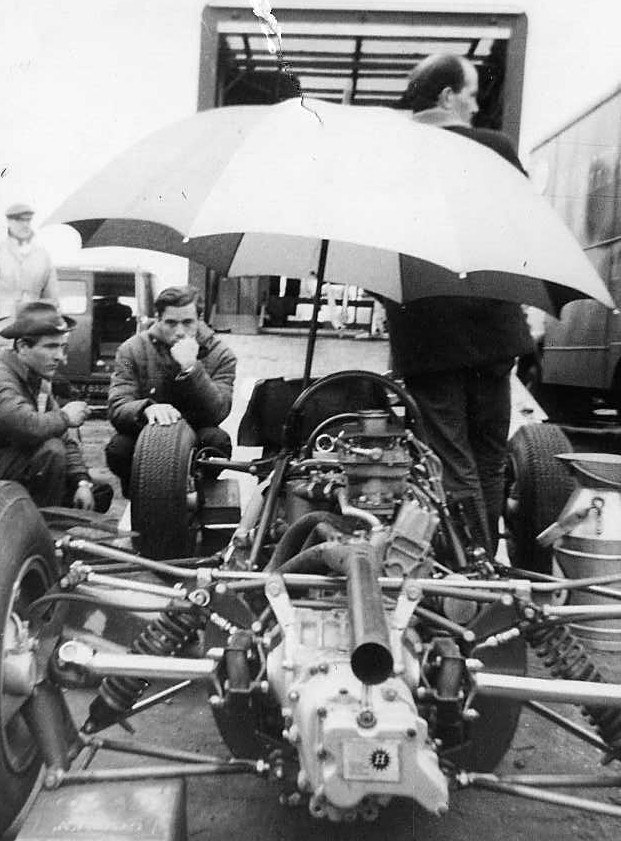
Clark in the Lotus pit at the 1964 German Grand Prix

In 1964, Clark came within just a few laps of retaining his World Championship crown. As in 1962, an oil leak from the engine cost him the title, conceding to John Surtees. Tyre failure damaging the Lotus's suspension put paid to that year's attempt at the 1964 Indianapolis 500. He made amends and won the Championship again in 1965, and also won the 1965 Indianapolis 500 in the Lotus 38. He had to miss the prestigious 1965 Monaco Grand Prix to compete at Indianapolis but made history by driving the first mid-engined car to win at the fabled Brickyard, as well as becoming the only driver to date to win both the Indy 500 and the F1 title in the same year. Other drivers, including Graham Hill, Mario Andretti, Emerson Fittipaldi, and Jacques Villeneuve, also won both crowns but not in the same year.

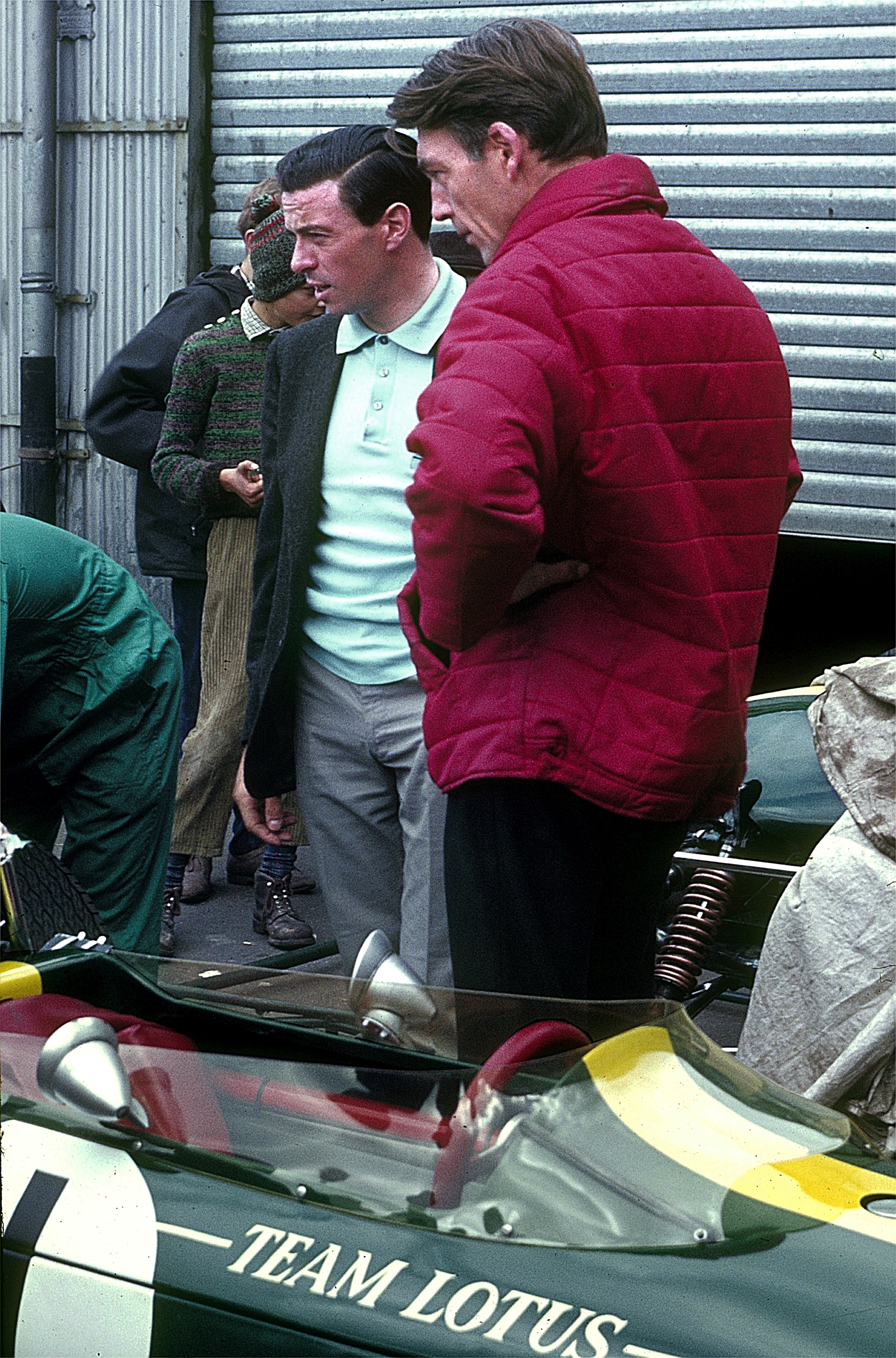
Clark outside the Lotus garage at the Nürburgring in 1966

The FIA decreed that from 1966 new 3-litre engine regulations would come into force, and Lotus were less competitive. Starting with a 2-litre Coventry-Climax engine in the Lotus 33, Clark did not score points until the 1966 British Grand Prix and a third place at the 1966 Dutch Grand Prix. From the 1966 Italian Grand Prix onwards, Lotus used the highly complex BRM H16 engine in the Lotus 43 car, with which Clark won the 1966 United States Grand Prix. He also picked up another second place at the 1966 Indianapolis 500, this time behind Hill.

During 1967, Lotus and Clark used three completely different cars and engines. The Lotus 43 performed poorly at the opening 1967 South African Grand Prix, so Clark used an old Lotus 33 at the 1967 Monaco Grand Prix, retiring with suspension failure. Lotus then began its fruitful association with Ford-Cosworth. Their first car, the Lotus 49 featuring the most successful F1 engine in history, the Ford-Cosworth DFV, won its first race at the 1967 Dutch Grand Prix, driven by Clark. He won with it again at the 1967 British, United States, and Mexican Grands Prix, and at the 1968 South African Grand Prix.

Concurrent with competing in the F1 World Drivers' Championship, Clark competed with Lotus in the Australasia-based Tasman Series, run for older F1 cars. He was series champion in 1965, 1967, and 1968. He won fourteen races in all, a record for the series. This included winning the 1968 Australian Grand Prix at the Sandown International Raceway in Melbourne, where he defeated the Ferrari 246T of Chris Amon by just 0.1 seconds after 55 laps of the 3.1 km (1.92 mi) circuit, the closest finish in the history of the Australian Grand Prix. The 1968 Tasman Series and Australian Grand Prix would prove to be his last major wins before his death.

== Performances ==
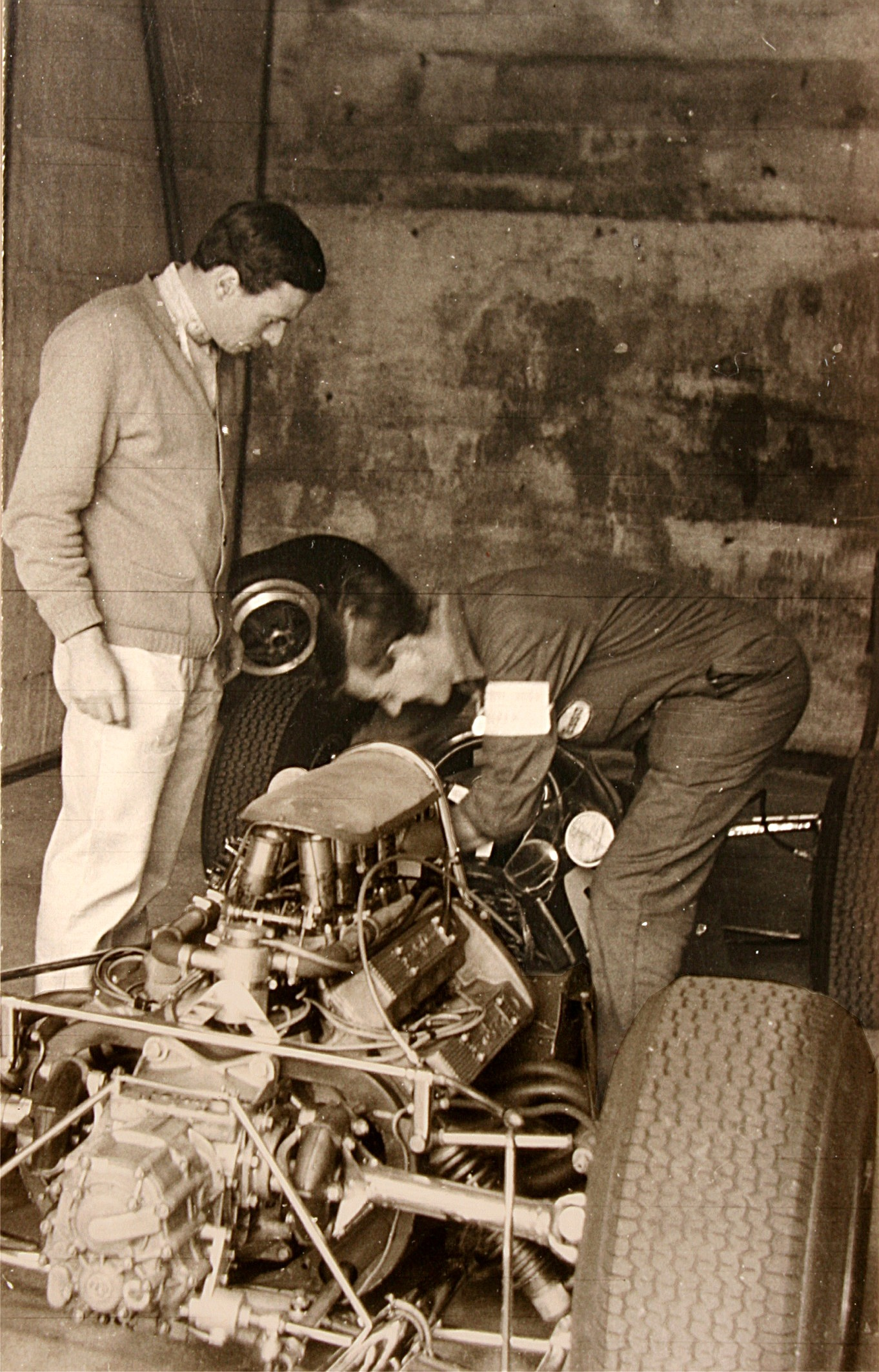
Clark at the Nürburgring in 1965

In what would be the first of seven victories for Clark and Team Lotus that year, he won the 1963 Belgian Grand Prix at Spa-Francorchamps in foggy and rainy conditions. After starting eighth on the grid, he passed all of the cars in front of him, including early leader Graham Hill. About 17 laps into the race, with the rain coming down harder than ever, Clark had lapped the entire field except for Bruce McLaren, and was almost five minutes ahead of McLaren and his Cooper. In the 1965 Belgian Grand Prix at Spa-Francorchamps in the rain, Clark led every lap while driving most of the race one handed due to an issue with the gear lever. In the 1967 Italian Grand Prix at Monza after starting from pole, Clark was leading in his Lotus 49 (chassis R2), when a tyre punctured. He lost a lap while having the wheel changed in the pits. Rejoining sixteenth, he advanced through the field, progressively lowering the lap record and eventually equalling his pole time of 1m 28.5s, to regain the lost lap and the lead. He was narrowly ahead of Brabham and Surtees starting the last lap. As his car had not been filled with enough fuel, it faltered and finally coasted across the finish line in third place.

In his Indianapolis 500 win, Clark led for 190 of the 200 laps, with a then-record average speed of over 150 mph (240 km/h), to become the first non-American in almost half a century to win the race. In 1963 and 1965, Clark equalled Alberto Ascari's record for the highest percentage of possible championship points in a season (100%). Leading 71.47% of the laps in 1963, Clark held the record for the highest percentage of laps in the lead in a season, losing it 60 years later in 2023 to Max Verstappen. He still holds the Grand Chelem record; as of July 2023, only 26 drivers had secured a Grand Chelem, of which there had been 66 in total. Clark's record is that he had the most races taking pole, fastest lap, race win, and leading every lap, achieving this eight times in a 32-race span over three years (the 1962 British Grand Prix, the 1963 Dutch Grand Prix that he won by more than a full lap, the 1963 French Grand Prix, the 1963 Mexican Grand Prix, the 1964 British Grand Prix, the 1965 South African Grand Prix, the 1965 French Grand Prix, and the 1965 German Grand Prix). Clark is also one of three drivers (the other being Ascari and Sebastian Vettel have achieved the feat in consecutive races. Alongside Vettel and Verstappen, Clark is the only driver to achieve a Grand Chelem in three consecutive years, and is the sole driver to accomplish this feat for four consecutive years (1962–1965). Clark finished his career with 274 total points.

== Accident and death ==
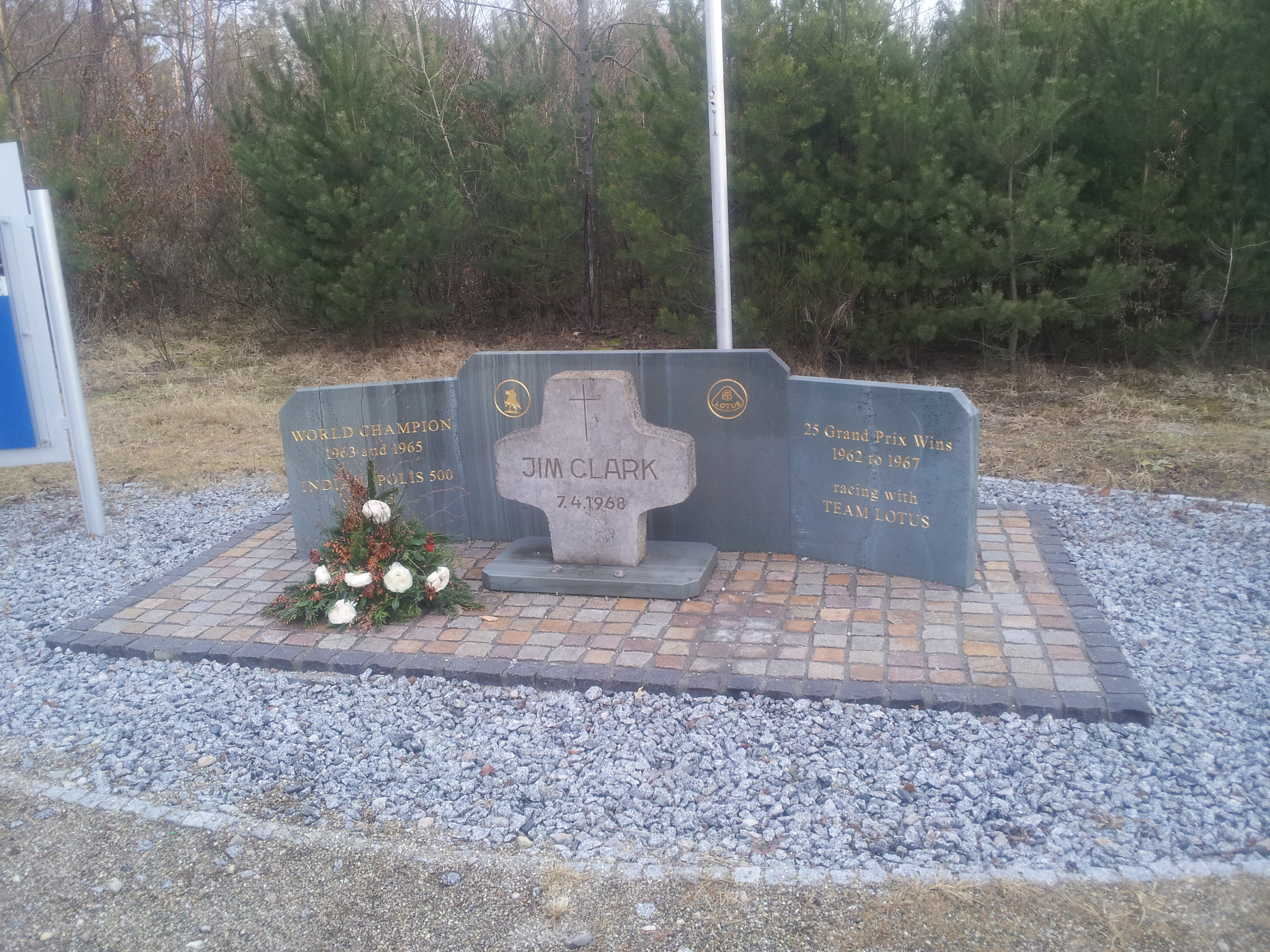
A Clark memorial at the Hockenheimring in Germany

On 7 April 1968, Clark died in a racing accident at the Hockenheimring in West Germany. During the four-month gap between the first race, which Clark won, and second of the 1968 season, drivers would compete in other racing formulas. Clark was originally slated to drive in the BOAC 1000 km sportscar race at Brands Hatch but instead chose to drive in the Deutschland Trophäe, a Formula Two race, for Lotus at the Hockenheimring, primarily due to contractual obligations with Firestone. Although the race has sometimes been described as a "minor race meeting", the entry list was impressive with top-running Matras for the French drivers Jean-Pierre Beltoise and Henri Pescarolo, Tecnos for Carlo Facetti and Clay Regazzoni, Team Brabhams for Derek Bell and Piers Courage, a Ferrari for Chris Amon, and McLarens for Graeme Lawrence and Robin Widdows. Team Lotus drivers Graham Hill and Clark were in Gold Leaf Team Lotuses and a young Max Mosley was also in the race, moving up from the Clubman series. The event was run in two heats.

On the fifth lap of the first heat, Clark's Lotus 48 veered off the track and crashed into the trees. He suffered a broken neck and skull fracture, and died before reaching the hospital. The cause of the crash was never definitively identified; investigators concluded it was most likely due to a deflating rear tyre. Clark's death had a big impact on the racing community, with fellow F1 drivers and friends, such as Hill, Surtees, Amon, Jackie Stewart, Dan Gurney, and Jack Brabham, all being personally affected by the tragedy. The 1968 F1 Drivers' Championship was subsequently won by Hill, his Lotus teammate, who held off Stewart for the crown, which he later dedicated to Clark. There is also a large memorial to Clark at Hockenheim today; because the track has been reduced in length and the old course reforested, the actual location of the crash is in a heavily wooded area. There was initial speculation as to whether the accident was caused by a driver error or a deflating rear tyre, and Lotus were investigated thoroughly by aircraft crash investigators for three weeks. Many journalists and drivers, including Surtees and Brabham, were convinced that the crash was caused by a deflating rear tyre and were adamant that it was not a driver error—simply because they believed Clark was not capable of making such a mistake.

== Legacy ==
There have been many stories about the tyres on Jim Clark's car lasting four races. This is true, but also the brake pads lasted three times longer than those of any other driver. Derek Wild used to say that you could put all the gearboxes on the bench in front of him in random order and he could tell which gearbox came out of Jim's car as it showed less signs of wear. The point is that the standard of preparation was no different between Jim's car and the number two car. It was just that the man was very "soft" on his car and so he tended to last the race distance as a result.

— Cedric Selzer, If You Have Come Second You Have Lost, Winning the World Championship with Jim Clark

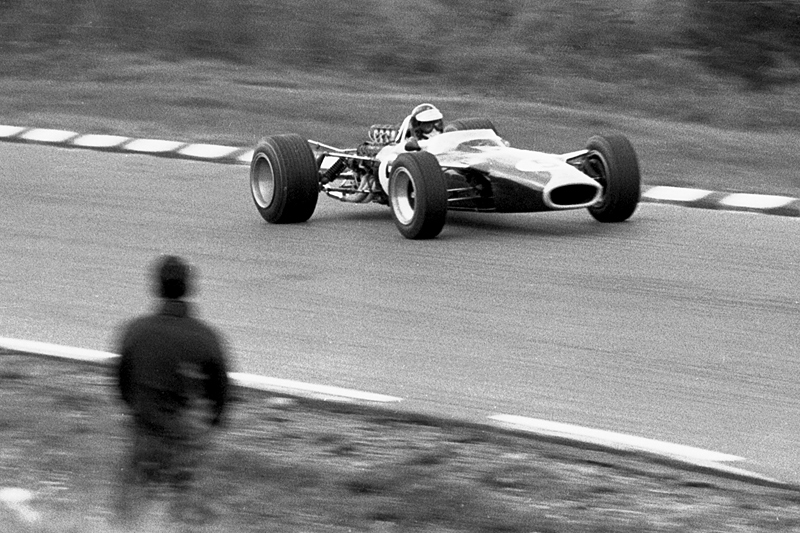
Clark driving a Lotus 49 at the 1967 United States Grand Prix

At the time of his death in 1968, the 32-year-old Clark had achieved 33 pole positions and had won 25 races from his 72 Grand Prix starts in championship races. He had more Grand Prix wins (25) and pole positions (33) than any other driver, including five-time World Champion Juan Manuel Fangio, despite winning three fewer World Championships; he also won most of the races he finished and was often winning, or in a podium position, when he had to retire due to mechanical failures, without which he could have equalled, if not beaten, Fangio's World Championship record. Fangio himself called Clark the greatest driver ever.

Although many of his records in total numbers were later eclipsed in part due to more races started and improved reliability, Clark's percentage-related ones remain either unbeaten or near the top. In 73 entries and 72 races (he missed a race weekend due to an injury), Clark achieved 33 poles (45.2%), 34 finishes (47.2%), 25 wins (34.7% wins to races, 73.5% wins to finishes), and 8 Grand Chelems (pole position, fastest lap, race win, and led every lap of the race); in those 34 races he finished, Clark led 70.3% of the laps and 68.0% of the distance. Some of his Grand Chelems and percentage records persist into the 21st century. Clark's record of seven wins in a season was not equalled until 1984 when Alain Prost won seven races for McLaren, and was not broken until Ayrton Senna won eight races in the 1988 season, also for McLaren (Senna's teammate that year was Prost, who again equalled the old record by winning seven races). Clark's record is favourable compared to Prost and Senna's, as the 1963 season only consisted of 10 rounds while 1984 and 1988 were run over 16 rounds, giving Prost a success rate of 43.75% and Senna a 50% winning ratio compared to Clark's 70% success rate. Clark's 60-year record of highest percentage of laps in the lead in a season was only broken in 2023 by Max Verstappen.

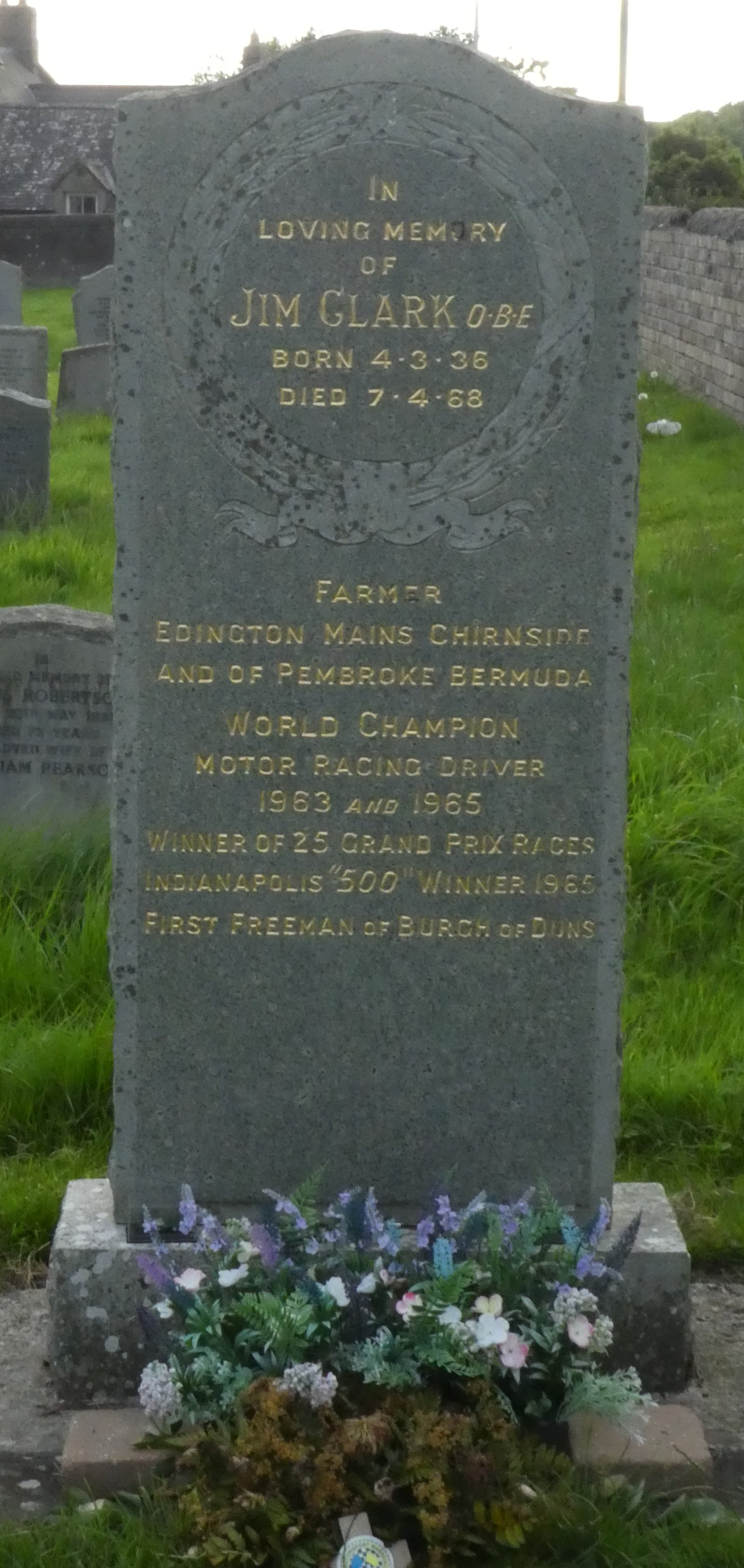
Clark's grave in Chirnside lists him as farmer before racing driver as he had wished.

Clark is remembered for his ability to drive and win in all types of cars and series, including a Lotus-Cortina, with which he won the 1964 British Touring Car Championship, Champ Car World Series, rallying, where he took part in the 1966 RAC Rally of Great Britain in a Lotus Cortina, and sports cars. He competed in the 24 Hours of Le Mans race in 1959, 1960, and 1961, finishing second in class in 1959 driving a Lotus Elite, and finishing third overall in 1960, driving an Aston Martin DBR1. He took part in a NASCAR event, driving a 7-litre Holman Moody Ford at the American 500 at the banked speedway at Rockingham on 29 October 1967. Qualifying in 25th place (out of 44), he worked his way up to 12th before retiring with engine failure. Clark was able to master difficult Lotus sportscar prototypes, such as the Lotus 30 and 40. He also had an ability to adapt to whichever car he was driving. Often while other top drivers would struggle to find a good car setup, Clark would set competitive lap times with whatever setup was provided and ask for the car to be left as it was. At the 1963 Belgian Grand Prix, he won by nearly five minutes over the second-place finisher, the widest gap on record. Clark wrote an autobiography, which was published just after his first world championship, titled Jim Clark at the Wheel. The book was updated after his Indy 500 victory. Of what made Clark such a good driver, Stewart said: "He was so smooth, he was so clean, he drove with such finesse. He never bullied a racing car, he sort of caressed it into doing the things he wanted it to do." When Clark died, fellow driver Chris Amon said: "If it could happen to him, what chance do the rest of us have? I think we all felt that. It seemed like we'd lost our leader."

Clark is buried in the village of Chirnside in Berwickshire. A memorial stone can be found at the Hockenheimring circuit, moved from the site of his crash to a location closer to the modern track, and a life-size statue of him in racing overalls stands by the bridge over a small stream in the village of his birth, Kilmany in Fife. The Jim Clark Motorsport Museum can be found in Duns. The Jim Clark Trophy was introduced in the 1987 season and for drivers of cars with naturally aspirated engines but was discontinued after turbo-charged engines were restricted in 1988 and dropped for 1989. The now Jim Clark Memorial Award is an annual award given by the Association of Scottish Motoring Writers to Scots who have contributed significantly to transport and motorsport.

The Jim Clark Rally is an annual event held in Berwickshire.

Clark was an inaugural inductee into the Scottish Sports Hall of Fame in 2002.

In 2020, The Economist ranked all champion drivers of F1 history by the relative importance of car quality to driver skill, based on a study by Andrew Bell of the University of Sheffield. This ranking considers the relative statistical significance of the car maker's contributions. Clark ranked second, behind Fangio. Objective mathematical models, such as Eichenberger and Stadelmann (2009, 2nd), original F1metrics (2014, 1st), Bell et al. (2015, 2nd), FiveThirtyEight (2018, 12th), and updated F1metrics (2019, 6th), put Clark consistently among the greatest Formula One drivers in history. In 2024, Motor Sport ranked Clark as the greatest racing driver of all time.

== Honours and awards ==
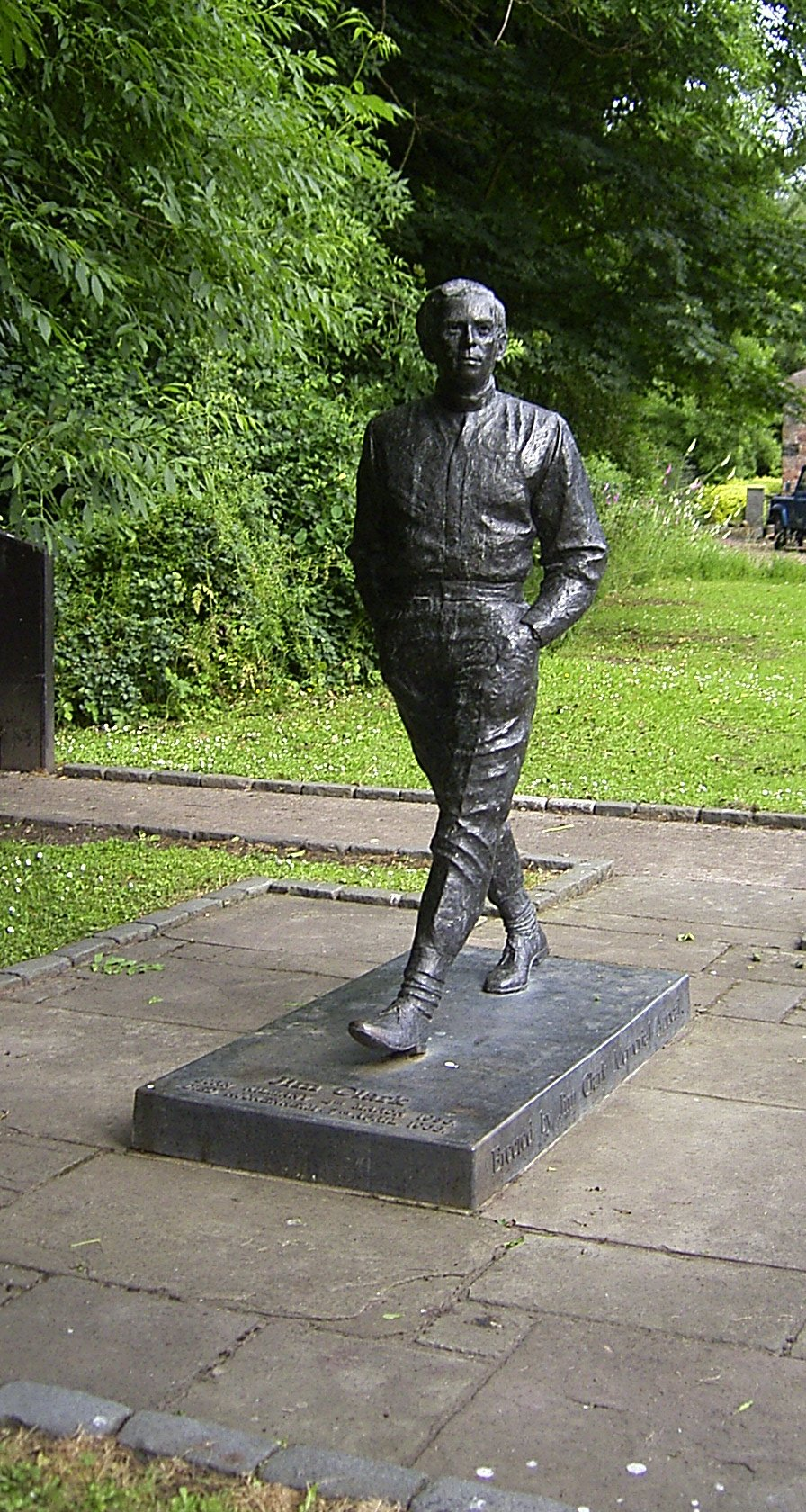
Clark memorial sculpture in Kilmany

In 1963 and 1965, Clark was awarded the Hawthorn Memorial Trophy for his achievements during the 1963 and 1965 Formula One Season. In 1965, Clark was awarded the American Broadcasting Company's Wide World of Sports Athlete of the Year. He was inducted into the Indianapolis Motor Speedway Hall of Fame in 1988. He was also inducted into the International Motorsports Hall of Fame in 1990. That same year, he was inducted into the Motorsports Hall of Fame of America in 1990. He was inducted into the Scottish Sports Hall of Fame in 2002, a member of their inaugural class. In 1964, he was awarded an OBE.

Clark was honoured at the Goodwood Revival in 2025—the sixtieth anniversary of his 1965 season.

== Racing record ==
=== Career summary ===
Season	Series	Team	Races	Wins	Poles	F/Laps	Podiums	Points	Position
1959	24 Hours of Le Mans	Border Reivers	1	0	0	0	0	—N/a	10th
1960	Formula One	Team Lotus	6	0	0	0	1	8	10th
1960	Formula Junior	Team Lotus	4	2	1	2	4	0	**1st**
1960	Formula Two	Team Lotus	2	0	0	0	0	0	NC
1960	24 Hours of Le Mans	Border Reivers	1	0	0	0	1	—N/a	**3rd**
1961	Formula One	Team Lotus	8	0	0	1	2	11	7th
1961	24 Hours of Le Mans	Border Reivers	1	0	0	0	0	—N/a	DNF
1962	Formula One	Team Lotus	9	3	6	5	3	30	**2nd**
1963	Formula One	Team Lotus	10	7	7	6	9	54	**1st**
1963	USAC Championship Car	Team Lotus	3	1	2	0	2	1200	6th
1963	British Saloon Car Championship – Class D	Team Lotus	2	1	0	1	2	18	12th
1963	British Saloon Car Championship – Class B	Team Lotus	1	1	1	1	1	9	9th
1964	Formula One	Team Lotus	10	3	5	4	3	32	**3rd**
1964	British Saloon Car Championship – Class B	Team Lotus	8	8	8	6	8	48	**1st**
1964	British Formula Two	Team Lotus	4	2	0	2	3	0	NC
1964	USAC Championship Car	Team Lotus	2	0	1	0	0	—N/a	NC
1965	Formula One	Team Lotus	9	6	6	6	6	54	**1st**
1965	Tasman Series	Team Lotus	8	5	3	4	6	35	**1st**
1965	British Saloon Car Championship – Class C	Team Lotus	6	3	3	5	4	30	**3rd**
1965	Trophées de France	Team Lotus	4	3	0	1	4	31	**1st**
1965	British Formula Two	Team Lotus	4	2	0	3	3	23	**1st**
1965	Australian Drivers' Championship	Team Lotus	2	1	0	1	1	0	NC
1965	USAC Championship Car	Team Lotus	1	1	0	0	1	1000	10th*
1966	Formula One	Team Lotus	8	1	2	0	2	16	6th
1966	Tasman Series	Team Lotus	8	1	2	1	4	25	**3rd**
1966	British Saloon Car Championship – Class C	Team Lotus	6	5	4	6	5	34	**2nd**
1966	Trophées de France	Team Lotus	4	0	0	2	1	6	6th
1966	British Formula Two	Team Lotus	2	0	1	0	1	4	5th
1966	USAC Championship Car	Team Lotus	1	0	0	0	1	—N/a	NC
1966	British Sports Car Championship	Felday Engineering Ltd.	1	0	0	0	0	0	NC
1967	Formula One	Team Lotus	11	4	6	5	5	41	**3rd**
1967	Tasman Series	Team Lotus	8	5	2	4	8	45	**1st**
1967	European Formula Two	Team Lotus	4	1	2	1	1	—N/a	NC^{‡}
1967	USAC Championship Car	Team Lotus	1	0	0	0	0	0	NC
1967	USAC Championship Car	Vollstedt Enterprises	1	0	0	0	0	0	NC
1968	Formula One	Team Lotus	1	1	1	1	1	9	11th
1968	Tasman Series	Team Lotus	2	0	2	0	0	44	**1st**
1968	Tasman Series	Gold Leaf Team Lotus	6	4	3	2	5	44	**1st**
1968	European Formula Two	Gold Leaf Team Lotus	1	0	0	0	0	—N/a	NC^{‡}

* Clark won the 1965 Indianapolis 500.
^{‡} Graded drivers not eligible for European Formula Two Championship points

=== Complete 24 Hours of Le Mans results ===
Year	Team	Co-drivers	Car	Class	Laps	Pos.	Class pos.
1959	(United Kingdom) Border Reivers	(United Kingdom) John Whitmore	Lotus Elite Mk.14-Climax	GT; 1.5	257	10th	**2nd**
1960	(United Kingdom) Border Reivers	(United Kingdom) Roy Salvadori	Aston Martin DBR1/300	S 3.0	306	**3rd**	**3rd**
1961	(United Kingdom) Border Reivers	(United Kingdom) Ron Flockhart	Aston Martin DBR1/300	S 3.0	132	DNF	DNF
1962	(United Kingdom) Team Lotus	(United Kingdom) Trevor Taylor	Lotus 23-Cosworth	P 1.0	0	WD^{‡}	WD

^{‡} Colin Chapman withdrew the entry following a dispute with the scrutineers about the car's eligibility.

=== Complete Formula One World Championship results ===
(key) (Races in bold indicate pole position; races in italics indicate fastest lap)

Year	Entrant	Chassis	Engine	1	2	3	4	5	6	7	8	9	10	11	12	WDC	Pts
1960	Team Lotus	Lotus 18	Climax FPF 2.5 L4	ARG	MON	500	NED; Ret	BEL; 5	FRA; 5	GBR; 16	POR; 3	ITA	USA; 16			10th	8
1961	Team Lotus	Lotus 21	Climax FPF 1.5 L4	MON; 10	NED; 3	BEL; 12	FRA; 3	GBR; Ret	GER; 4	ITA; Ret	USA; 7					7th	11
1962	Team Lotus	Lotus 25	Climax FWMV 1.5 V8	NED; 9	**MON**; Ret	BEL; 1	**FRA**; Ret	**GBR**; 1	GER; 4	**ITA**; Ret	**USA**; 1	**RSA**; Ret				**2nd**	**30**
1963	Team Lotus	Lotus 25	Climax FWMV 1.5 V8	**MON**; 8^{†}	BEL; 1	**NED**; 1	**FRA**; 1	**GBR**; 1	**GER**; 2	ITA; 1	USA; 3	**MEX**; 1	**RSA**; 1			**1st**	**54 (73)**
1964	Team Lotus	Lotus 25	Climax FWMV 1.5 V8	**MON**; 4^{†}	NED; 1	BEL; 1	**FRA**; Ret	**GBR**; 1			ITA; Ret					**3rd**	**32**
1964	Team Lotus	Lotus 33	Climax FWMV 1.5 V8						GER; Ret	AUT; Ret		**USA**; 7^{†}	**MEX**; 5^{†}			**3rd**	**32**
1965	Team Lotus	Lotus 33	Climax FWMV 1.5 V8	**RSA**; 1	MON	BEL; 1		**GBR**; 1	NED; 1	**GER**; 1	**ITA**; 10^{†}	USA; Ret	**MEX**; Ret			**1st**	**54**
1965	Team Lotus	Lotus 25	Climax FWMV 1.5 V8				**FRA**; 1									**1st**	**54**
1966	Team Lotus	Lotus 33	Climax FWMV 2.0 V8	**MON**; Ret	BEL; Ret	FRA; DNS	GBR; 4	NED; 3	**GER**; Ret							6th	16
1966	Team Lotus	Lotus 43	BRM P75 3.0 H16							ITA; Ret	USA; 1	MEX; Ret				6th	16
1967	Team Lotus	Lotus 43	BRM P75 3.0 H16	RSA; Ret												**3rd**	**41**
1967	Team Lotus	Lotus 33	Climax FWMV 2.0 V8		MON; Ret											**3rd**	**41**
1967	Team Lotus	Lotus 49	Ford Cosworth DFV 3.0 V8			NED; 1	**BEL**; 6	FRA; Ret	**GBR**; 1	**GER**; Ret	**CAN**; Ret	**ITA**; 3	USA; 1	**MEX**; 1		**3rd**	**41**
1968	Team Lotus	Lotus 49	Ford Cosworth DFV 3.0 V8	**RSA**; 1	ESP	MON	BEL	NED	FRA	GBR	GER	ITA	CAN	USA	MEX	11th	9

^{†} Driver did not finish the Grand Prix but was classified as he completed over 90% of the race distance.

=== Formula One records ===
Clark holds the following Formula One records:

Record		Achieved	Ref
**Most grand slams**	8	1965 German Grand Prix	
**Most grand slams in a season**	3 (Note: Record shared with Alberto Ascari (1952), Nigel Mansell (1992), and Lewis Hamilton (2017).)	1963	
**Most consecutive grand slams**	2 (Note: Record shared with Alberto Ascari and Sebastian Vettel.)	1963 Dutch Grand Prix – 1963 French Grand Prix	
**Highest percentage of possible championship points in a season**	100% (Note: In 1963 and 1965, only the best six of ten scores counted towards the World Drivers' Championship. The record is shared with Ascari (1952).)	1963, 1965	

Footnotes

=== Non-championship Formula One results ===
(key) (Races in bold indicate pole position; races in italics indicate fastest lap)

Year	Entrant	Chassis	Engine	1	2	3	4	5	6	7	8	9	10	11	12	13	14	15	16	17	18	19	20	21
1960	Team Lotus	Lotus 18	Climax FPF 2.5 L4	GLV	INT	**SIL**; Ret	LOM; 2	OUL; Ret																
1961	Team Lotus	Lotus 18	Climax FPF 1.5 L4	LOM; 6	GLV	PAU; 1	BRX; Ret	VIE	AIN; 9	SYR; 6	NAP	LON				DAN; 7								
1961	Team Lotus	Lotus 21	Climax FPF 1.5 L4										SIL; 2	SOL; 7	**KAN**; Ret		MOD; 4	FLG; 4	OUL; Ret	LEW	VAL	**RAN**; 1	**NAT**; 1	**RSA**; 1
1962	Team Lotus	Lotus 21	Climax FPF 1.5 L4	**CAP**; 2																				
1962	Team Lotus	Lotus 24	Climax FWMV 1.5 V8		**BRX**; Ret	LOM; 1	LAV	GLV	**PAU**; Ret	**AIN**; 1	INT; 2	NAP												
1962	Team Lotus	Lotus 25	Climax FWMV 1.5 V8										**MAL**; Ret	CPL	**RMS**; Ret	**SOL**; Ret	KAN	MED	DAN	OUL; 1	**MEX**; 1^{1}	**RAN**; 1	**NAT**; 2	
1963	Team Lotus	Lotus 25	Climax FWMV 1.5 V8	**LOM**; 2	GLV	**PAU**; 1	**IMO**; 1	SYR	**AIN**; 3	INT; 1	ROM	**SOL**; NC	KAN; 1	MED	**AUT**; Ret	**OUL**; 1	RAN; 16							
1964	Team Lotus	Lotus 25	Climax FWMV 1.5 V8	**DMT**; Ret	NWT; 1	SYR		INT; Ret		MED; 2	RAN													
1964	Team Lotus	Lotus 33	Climax FWMV 1.5 V8				AIN; Ret		**SOL**; 1															
1965	Team Lotus	Lotus 33	Climax FWMV 1.5 V8	**ROC**; Ret	**SYR**; 1																			
1965	Team Lotus	Lotus 25	Climax FWMV 1.5 V8			SMT; 1	INT	**MED**; 2	RAN															
1966	Team Lotus	Lotus 33	Climax FWMV 2.0 V8	RSA	SYR	INT	OUL; 3																	
1967	Team Lotus	Lotus 49	Ford Cosworth DFV 3.0 V8	ROC	SPR	INT	SYR	OUL	**ESP**; 1															

Notes

- **^1** – After Clark was disqualified for a push start, he took over the car of Trevor Taylor.

=== American open-wheel racing ===
(key) (Races in bold indicate pole position)

==== USAC Championship Car ====
USAC Championship Car results
Year	Team	Chassis	Engine	1	2	3	4	5	6	7	8	9	10	11	12	13	14	15	16	17	18	19	20	21	Pos.	Pts
1963	Team Lotus	Lotus 29	Ford 255 ci V8	TRE	INDY; 2	MIL	LAN	TRE	ISF	**MIL**; 1	DSF	INF	**TRE**; 21	SAC	PHX										6th	1200
1964	Team Lotus	Lotus 34	Ford 255 ci V8	PHX	TRE	**INDY**; 24	MIL	LAN	TRE	ISF	MIL	DSF	INF	TRE; 18	SAC	PHX									NC	0
1965	Team Lotus	Lotus 38	Ford 255 ci V8	PHX	TRE	INDY; 1	MIL	LAN	PPR	TRE	IRP	ATL	LAN	MIL	ISF	MIL	DSF	INF	TRE	SAC	PHX				10th	1000
1966	STP Gas Treatment	Lotus 38	Ford 255 ci V8	PHX	TRE	INDY; 2	MIL	LAN	ATL	PPR	IRP	LAN	ISF	MIL	DSF	INF	TRE	SAC	PHX						NC	0
1967	Team Lotus	Lotus 38	Ford 255 ci V8	PHX	TRE	INDY; 31	MIL	LAN	PPR	MOS	MOS	IRP	LAN	MTR	MTR	ISF	MIL	DSF	INF	TRE	SAC	HAN	PHX		NC	0
1967	Vollstedt Enterprises	Vollstedt 67	Ford 255 ci V8																					RSD; 22	NC	0

===== Indianapolis 500 =====
Year	Chassis	Engine	Start	Finish	Team
1963	Lotus	Ford	5	2	Team Lotus
1964	Lotus	Ford	**1**	24	Team Lotus
1965	Lotus	Ford	2	**1**	Team Lotus
1966	Lotus	Ford	2	2	STP Gas Treatment
1967	Lotus	Ford	16	31	Team Lotus

- Clark's starting positions from 1964, 1965, and 1966 represent the best 3-race starting streak of the 1960s.
- Clark's 1965 win was the first win for a mid-engined car at the Indianapolis 500. No front-engined car has won the race since.

=== Complete Tasman Series results ===
(key) (Races in bold indicate pole position; results in italics indicate fastest lap)

Year	Entrant	Chassis	Engine	1	2	3	4	5	6	7	8	Pos.	Pts
1965	Team Lotus	Lotus 32B	Coventry Climax FPF 2.5 L4	PUK; Ret	**LEV**; 1	WIG; 1	**TER**; 1	WAR; 1	SAN; 2	LON; 5	**LAK^{1}** 1	**1st**	**35 (44)**
1966	Team Lotus	Lotus 39	Coventry Climax FPF 2.5 L4	PUK; Ret	LEV; 2	WIG; Ret	**TER**; Ret	**WAR**; 1	LAK; 3	SAN; 2	LON; 7	**3rd**	**25**
1967	Team Lotus	Lotus 33	Coventry Climax FWMV 2.5 V8	PUK; 2	**LEV^{1}** 1	WIG; 1	TER^{1} 1	**LAK**; 1	WAR; 2	SAN; 1	LON; 2	**1st**	**45**
1968	Team Lotus	Lotus 49T	Ford Cosworth DFW 2.5 V8	**PUK**; Ret	**LEV**; Ret							**1st**	**44**
1968	Gold Leaf Team Lotus	Lotus 49T	Ford Cosworth DFW 2.5 V8			**WIG**; 1	TER; 2	SUR; 1	**WAR**; 1	SAN; 1	**LON**; 5	**1st**	**44**

^{1}Lakeside in 1965 and Levin and Teretonga in 1967 did not count towards Tasman Cup points.

=== Formula Two results ===
(Races in bold indicate pole position, races in italic indicate fastest lap.)

For reasons of space, only those Formula Two events which Clark attended are shown.

Year	Entrant	Chassis	Engine	1	2	3	4	5	6	7	8	9	10	11	12	13
1960	Team Lotus	Lotus 18	Climax FPF	BRX; Ret	AIN; Ret^{1}	**SOL**; 8	BRH; 1									
1964	Ron Harris Team Lotus	Lotus 32	Cosworth SCA	**PAU**; 1	**NÜR**; 1	MAL; 1	PAL; 10	RMS; 4	BRH; 1	**KAN**; 2	ALB; Ret	OUL; 2				
1965	Ron Harris Team Lotus	Lotus 35	Cosworth SCA	MAL; DNS^{2}	SNE; 3	PAU; 1	LON; 1	RMS; 3	ROU; 1	KAN; Ret	BRH; 1	OUL; 6	ALB; 1			
1966	Ron Harris Team Lotus	Lotus 35	Cosworth SCA	**OUL**; DNS^{2}	SMT; Ret	PAU; 7										
1966	Ron Harris Team Lotus	Lotus 44	Cosworth SCA				BAR; Ret	KAN; 3	FIN; 3	MNT; 2	BUG; 6	ALB; NC	BRH; 3			
1967	Team Lotus	Lotus 48	Cosworth FVA	**PAU**; 4	**BAR**; 1	**NÜR**; Ret	ZOL; 2	RMS; Ret	ROU; Ret	TUL; Ret	JAR; 1	KAN; 3	PER; Ret	FIN; 1	**HÄM**; 3	ALB; 3
1968	Gold Leaf Team Lotus	Lotus 48	Cosworth FVA	BAR; Ret	HOC; Ret											

^{1} Innes Ireland took over Clark's car and finished in 9th place.
^{2} Races cancelled due to bad weather.

=== Complete British Saloon Car Championship results ===
(key) (Races in bold indicate pole position; races in italics indicate fastest lap.)

Year	Team	Car	Class	1	2	3	4	5	6	7	8	9	10	11	DC	Pts	Class
1963	Alan Brown Racing Ltd	Ford Galaxie	D	SNE	OUL	GOO	AIN	SIL	CRY	SIL	BRH ovr:1 cls:1	BRH	OUL		12th	18	6th
1963	Team Lotus	Ford Cortina Lotus	B											SNE ovr:2 cls:1	12th	18	9th
1964	Team Lotus	Ford Cortina Lotus	B	SNE ovr:2 cls:1	GOO ovr:2 cls:1	OUL ovr:1 cls:1	AIN ovr:3 cls:1	SIL ovr:3 cls:1	CRY ovr:1† cls:1†	**BRH** ovr:2 cls:1	OUL ovr:1 cls:1				**1st**	**48**	**1st**
1965	Team Lotus	Ford Cortina Lotus	C	**BRH**; Ret	OUL	SNE ovr:5 cls:2	GOO ovr:1 cls:1	SIL	CRY ovr:2† cls:1†	BRH; DSQ	OUL ovr:1 cls:1				7th	30	**3rd**
1966	Team Lotus	Ford Cortina Lotus	C	**SNE** ovr:3 cls:1	GOO ovr:4 cls:1	SIL	CRY	BRH	BRH ovr:1 cls:1	OUL ovr:1† cls:1†	**BRH** ovr:? cls:3				5th	34	**2nd**

† Events with two races staged for the different classes.

== See also ==
- Formula One drivers from the United Kingdom

Sporting positions
Preceded by Graham Hill	BRDC International Trophy; Winner; 1963	Succeeded by Jack Brabham
Preceded by Jim McElreath	Indianapolis 500; Rookie of the Year; 1963	Succeeded by Johnny White
Preceded by Graham Hill	Formula One World Champion; 1963	Succeeded by John Surtees
Preceded by Jack Sears	British Touring Car; Champion; 1964	Succeeded by Roy Pierpoint
Preceded by A. J. Foyt	Indianapolis 500; Winner; 1965	Succeeded by Graham Hill
Preceded by John Surtees	Formula One World Champion; 1965	Succeeded by Jack Brabham
Preceded by Bruce McLaren	Tasman Series; Champion; 1965	Succeeded by Jackie Stewart
Preceded by Jackie Stewart	Tasman Series; Champion; 1967–1968	Succeeded by Chris Amon

Awards
Preceded by Graham Hill	Hawthorn Memorial Trophy; 1963	Succeeded by John Surtees
Preceded by John Surtees	Hawthorn Memorial Trophy; 1965	Succeeded by Jack Brabham

Records
Preceded by Mike Hawthorn; 29 years, 192 days (1958 season)	Youngest Formula One; World Drivers' Champion; 27 years, 188 days (1963 season)	Succeeded by Emerson Fittipaldi; 25 years, 273 days (1972 season)
Preceded by Juan Manuel Fangio; 24 wins (1950 – 1958)	Most Grand Prix wins 25 wins, 25th at the 1968 South African GP	Succeeded by Jackie Stewart; 27 wins, 26th at the 1973 Dutch GP
