= Lotus 48 =

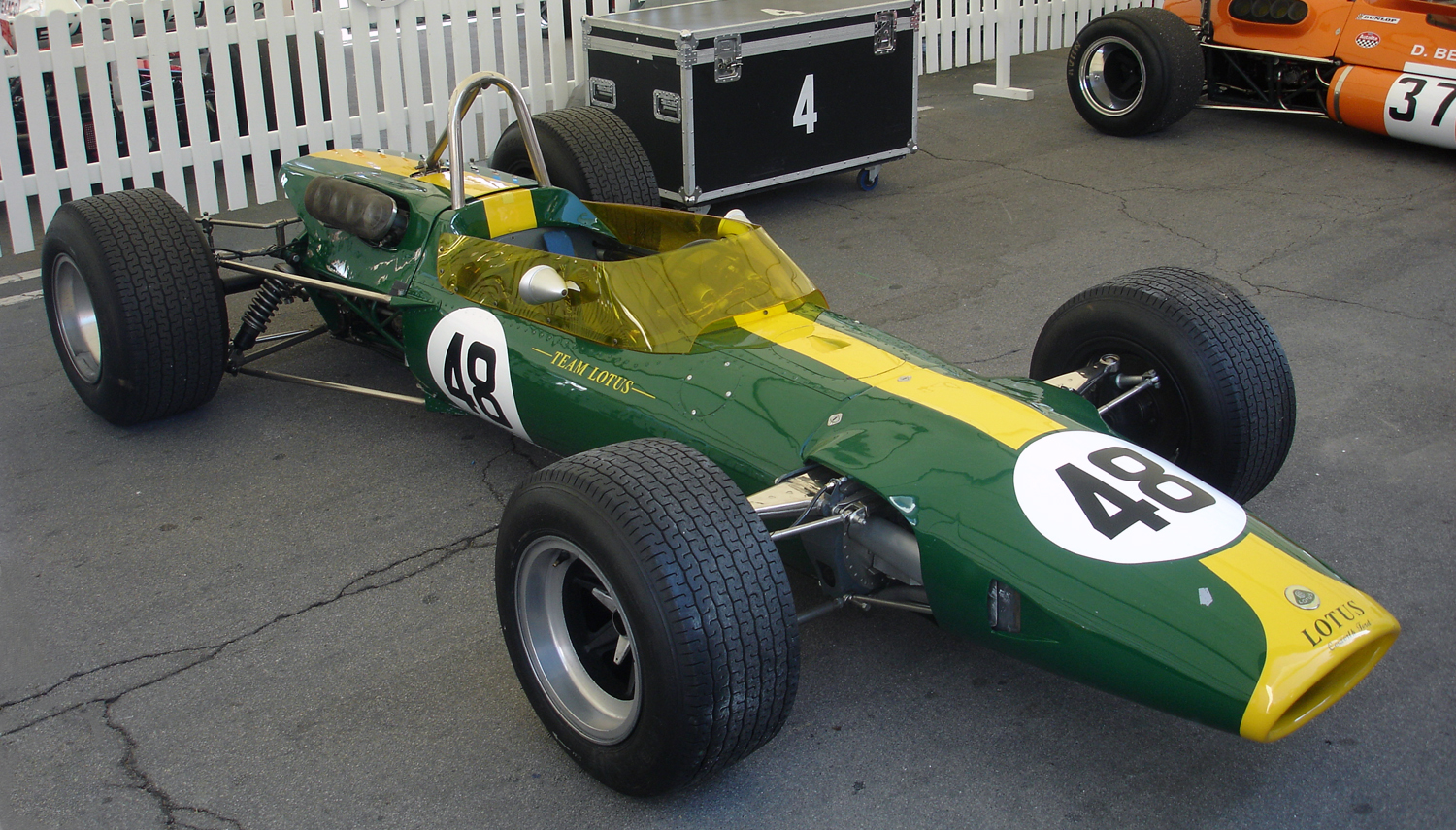
- Category: Formula One; Formula Two
- Constructor: Team Lotus
- Designers: Colin Chapman (Technical Director); Maurice Philippe (Chief Designer)
- Predecessor: 44
- Successor: 59

Technical specifications
- Chassis: Aluminium monocoque with rear subframe
- Suspension (front): Lower wishbones, top rockers actuating in-board coil springs over dampers, anti-roll bar
- Suspension (rear): Reversed lower wishbones, top links, twin radius arms, coil springs over dampers, anti-roll bar
- Engine: Ford Cosworth FVA, 1,600 cc (98 cu in), L4, NA, mid-mounted.
- Transmission: ZF 5DS12 5-speed manual gearbox
- Weight: 420 kg (930 lb)
- Tyres: Firestone

Competition history
- Notable entrants: Team Lotus
- Notable drivers: (United Kingdom) Jackie Oliver
- Debut: 1967 German Grand Prix
Races	Wins	Podiums	Poles	F/Laps
1	0	0	0	0
- Unless otherwise stated, all data refer to Formula One World Championship Grands Prix only.

The Lotus 48 was a Formula 2 racing car designed by Colin Chapman and Maurice Phillippe and powered by a 1,600 cc (98 cu in) Cosworth FVA engine. It won three races in the hands of Jim Clark but was generally uncompetitive against rival machinery. Ultimately, its main claim to fame (or notoriety) is as the car in which Clark was killed at Hockenheim on 7 April 1968.

== Development ==
The Lotus 48 was designed to take the Cosworth FVA engine to compete under the new Formula Two regulations introduced in 1967. It had a full monocoque chassis with a tubular spaceframe for the engine, inboard coil springs operated by rocker arms at the front and reversed wishbones with twin trailing and top links at the rear. The FVA engine was mated to a ZF gearbox. Only four examples were built; although it was intended as a customer car, prospective customers flocked to buy the more successful Brabham BT23 instead.

== Racing history ==
Graham Hill persuaded Colin Chapman to take the new car to the 1967 Australian Grand Prix, where it ran as high as third before succumbing to gearbox failure. Thereafter it was run by Team Lotus in the 1967 Formula Two season, driven by Hill and Jim Clark, and occasionally by Jackie Oliver. Clark scored three wins, and several poles and fastest laps between him and Hill. Oliver drove the car in the 1967 German Grand Prix which was run for Formula One and Formula Two cars; he finished first of the Formula Two entries and fifth overall.

Hill and Clark drove the 48 again in 1968 but Clark was killed in the Deutschland Trophäe race at Hockenheim. Jackie Oliver then joined Hill as full-time team member, but neither scored any wins, Oliver's best result being second at the Rhein-Pokalrennen and Hill placing fourth at the Reims Grand Prix.

At the end of 1968 the cars were sold to Gerry Kinnane's Team Ireland. Jackie Oliver drove one in the Argentine Temporada series, and then for 1969 the cars made sporadic appearances in the hands of John Watson and John Pollock, with little success.

== Complete Formula One World Championship results ==
(key)

Year	Entrant	Engine	Tyres	Drivers	1	2	3	4	5	6	7	8	9	10	11	Points	WCC
1967	Lotus Components Ltd.	Ford Cosworth FVA 1.6 L4	F		RSA	MON	NED	BEL	FRA	GBR	GER	CAN	ITA	USA	MEX	NC^{1}	0^{1}
1967	Lotus Components Ltd.	Ford Cosworth FVA 1.6 L4	F	Jackie Oliver							5					NC^{1}	0^{1}

^1 No points scored by the Lotus 48 as it was run in a Formula Two Category.
