= 1960 Belgian Grand Prix =

← Previous race	Next race →
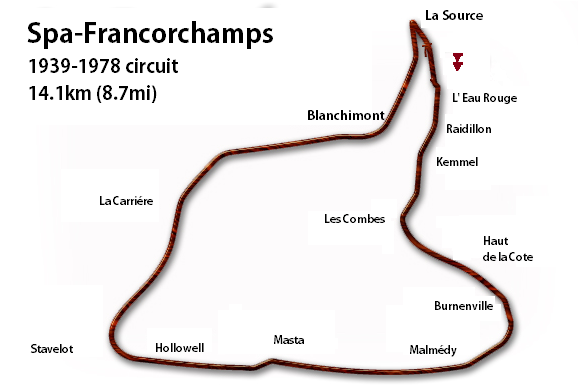

Race details
- Date: 19 June 1960
- Official name: XX Grand Prix de Belgique
- Location: Spa-Francorchamps, Francorchamps, Belgium
- Course: Grand Prix Circuit
- Course length: 14.100 km (8.763 miles)
- Distance: 36 laps, 507.600 km (315.475 miles)

Pole position
Driver	(Australia) Jack Brabham	Cooper-Climax
- Time: 3:50.0

Fastest lap
Driver	(Australia) Jack Brabham (United Kingdom) Innes Ireland (United States) Phil Hill	Cooper-Climax; Lotus-Climax; Ferrari
- Time: 3:51.9

Podium
First	(Australia) Jack Brabham	Cooper-Climax
Second	(New Zealand) Bruce McLaren	Cooper-Climax
Third	(Belgium) Olivier Gendebien	Cooper-Climax

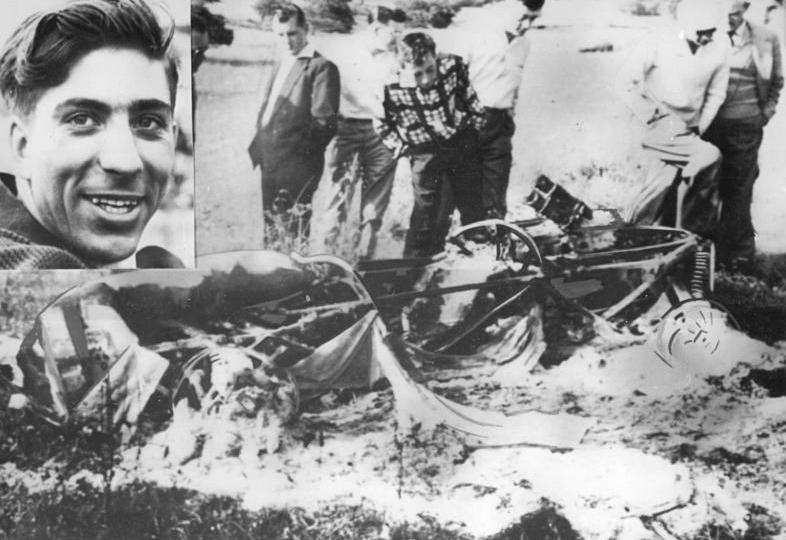
The remains of Alan Stacey's car after his fatal accident in the 1960 Belgian Grand Prix. In the inset, Stacey before the race.

The 1960 Belgian Grand Prix was a Formula One motor race held at Spa-Francorchamps on 19 June 1960. It was race 5 of 10 in the 1960 World Championship of Drivers and race 4 of 9 in the 1960 International Cup for Formula One Manufacturers. Stirling Moss and Mike Taylor were seriously injured in crashes during practice, and Chris Bristow and Alan Stacey were killed in accidents during the race. Along with the 1994 San Marino Grand Prix, it is one of two occasions in which two driver fatalities have occurred at a Formula One race meeting, and the only one where both occurred during the race itself.

== Practice and race laps 1-19 ==
Practice for the event saw Stirling Moss and Mike Taylor injured in separate accidents, with Taylor suffering injuries after a crash at Stavelot which ended his racing career, and Moss injured seriously (two broken legs) after crashing at Burnenville to keep him out of racing for a number of months including the 1960 24 Hours of Le Mans. In the race itself, the Lotus drivers Innes Ireland and Jim Clark got off to good starts before Ireland eventually spun out with clutch trouble on lap 14.

== Fatal accidents ==
On lap 20 Chris Bristow, driving a year-old Cooper for the British Racing Partnership, went off line at Malmedy while battling for sixth place with the Ferrari of Mairesse. Bristow lost control, crashing into a 4-foot (1.2 m) high embankment, and was thrown from his car and landed on a barbed wire fence which decapitated him.

Five laps later, Alan Stacey was hit in the face by a bird at Masta, causing him to lose control with his car somersaulting off the track and landing in a field. The car then caught fire and Stacey, still trapped inside, was burned to death. It was the only Formula One race meeting in which two drivers were killed until the deaths of Roland Ratzenberger and Ayrton Senna at the 1994 San Marino Grand Prix.

== Race conclusion ==
The race distance had been lengthened to 36 laps from 24 laps. Jack Brabham crossed the finish line first a minute and three seconds ahead of his Cooper-Climax teammate, Bruce McLaren. The results highlight an unusual quirk in the rules regarding classification of non-finishers. Under modern rules, Graham Hill would have been classified third, since he completed lap 35 before the lapped Olivier Gendebien. Hill then retired, in the pits, but was not classified since he did not push his car over the line after the winner took the finish (as required by the rules of the time). In fact the rule about crossing the finishing line was inconsistently applied – at the 1959 German Grand Prix, Harry Schell was classified seventh despite only completing 49 of the race's 60 laps.

== Classification ==
=== Qualifying ===
Pos	No	Driver	Constructor	Time	Gap
1	2	(Australia) Jack Brabham	Cooper-Climax	3:50.0	—
2	38	(United Kingdom) Tony Brooks	Cooper-Climax	3:52.5	+2.5
3	12	(United Kingdom) Stirling Moss	Lotus-Climax	3:52.6	+2.6
4	24	(United States) Phil Hill	Ferrari	3:53.3	+3.3
5	34	(Belgium) Olivier Gendebien	Cooper-Climax	3:53.5	+3.5
6	10	(United Kingdom) Graham Hill	BRM	3:54.2	+4.2
7	6	(Sweden) Jo Bonnier	BRM	3:54.8	+4.8
8	14	(United Kingdom) Innes Ireland	Lotus-Climax	3:55.4	+5.4
9	36	(United Kingdom) Chris Bristow	Cooper-Climax	3:56.3	+6.3
10	18	(United Kingdom) Jim Clark	Lotus-Climax	3:57.5	+7.5
11	26	(Germany) Wolfgang von Trips	Ferrari	3:57.8	+7.8
12	8	(United States) Dan Gurney	BRM	3:58.3	+8.3
13	22	(Belgium) Willy Mairesse	Ferrari	3:58.9	+8.9
14	4	(New Zealand) Bruce McLaren	Cooper-Climax	4:00.0	+10.0
15	32	(Belgium) Lucien Bianchi	Cooper-Climax	4:00.6	+10.6
16	28	(United States) Lance Reventlow	Scarab	4:09.7	+19.7
17	16	(United Kingdom) Alan Stacey	Lotus-Climax	4:17.6	+27.6
18	30	(United States) Chuck Daigh	Scarab	4:18.5	+28.5

=== Race ===
Pos	No	Driver	Constructor	Laps	Time/Retired	Grid	Points
1	2	(Australia) Jack Brabham	Cooper-Climax	36	2:21:37.3	1	8
2	4	(New Zealand) Bruce McLaren	Cooper-Climax	36	+ 1:03.3	14	6
3	34	(Belgium) Olivier Gendebien	Cooper-Climax	35	+ 1 Lap	5	4
4	24	(United States) Phil Hill	Ferrari	35	+ 1 Lap	4	3
5	18	(United Kingdom) Jim Clark	Lotus-Climax	34	+ 2 Laps	10	2
6	32	(Belgium) Lucien Bianchi	Cooper-Climax	28	+ 8 Laps	15	1
Ret	10	(United Kingdom) Graham Hill	BRM	35	Engine	6	
Ret	16	(United Kingdom) Alan Stacey	Lotus-Climax	24	Fatal accident	17	
Ret	22	(Belgium) Willy Mairesse	Ferrari	23	Transmission	13	
Ret	26	(Germany) Wolfgang von Trips	Ferrari	22	Transmission	11	
Ret	36	(United Kingdom) Chris Bristow	Cooper-Climax	19	Fatal accident	9	
Ret	30	(United States) Chuck Daigh	Scarab	16	Engine	18	
Ret	6	(Sweden) Jo Bonnier	BRM	14	Engine	7	
Ret	14	(United Kingdom) Innes Ireland	Lotus-Climax	13	Spun Off/Clutch	8	
Ret	8	(United States) Dan Gurney	BRM	4	Engine	12	
Ret	38	(United Kingdom) Tony Brooks	Cooper-Climax	2	Gearbox	2	
Ret	28	(United States) Lance Reventlow	Scarab	1	Engine	16	
DNS	12	(United Kingdom) Stirling Moss	Lotus-Climax		Accident	3	
DNS	20	(United Kingdom) Mike Taylor	Lotus-Climax		Accident		

== Notes ==
- This was the Formula One World Championship debut race for Belgian driver Willy Mairesse.
- Excluding the eleven Indianapolis 500 races - that were part of the Formula One World Championship between 1950-1960 - this was the first Formula One World Championship race where a Frenchman did not participate. In all the other 77 races, a Frenchman had participated. A British driver had been present at 75 of those races.

== Championship standings after the race ==
Drivers' Championship standings

	Pos	Driver	Points
	1	(New Zealand) Bruce McLaren	20
2	2	(Australia) Jack Brabham	16
1	3	(United Kingdom) Stirling Moss	11
1	4	(United States) Jim Rathmann	8
	5	(United Kingdom) Innes Ireland	7

Constructors' Championship standings

Pos	Constructor	Points
1	(United Kingdom) Cooper-Climax	30
2	(United Kingdom) Lotus-Climax	17
3	(Italy) Ferrari	15
4	(United Kingdom) BRM	6
5	(United Kingdom) Cooper-Maserati	3

- Notes: Only the top five positions are included for both sets of standings.

Previous race: 1960 Dutch Grand Prix	FIA Formula One World Championship; 1960 season	Next race: 1960 French Grand Prix
Previous race: 1958 Belgian Grand Prix	Belgian Grand Prix	Next race: 1961 Belgian Grand Prix
