= 1960 Dutch Grand Prix =

← Previous race	Next race →
- Zandvoort original layout

Race details
- Date: 6 June 1960
- Official name: VIII Grote Prijs van Nederland
- Location: Circuit Park Zandvoort; Zandvoort, Netherlands
- Course: Permanent racing facility
- Course length: 4.193 km (2.605 miles)
- Distance: 75 laps, 314.475 km (195.406 miles)

Pole position
Driver	(United Kingdom) Stirling Moss	Lotus-Climax
- Time: 1:33.2

Fastest lap
Driver	(United Kingdom) Stirling Moss	Lotus-Climax
- Time: 1.33.8

Podium
First	(Australia) Jack Brabham	Cooper-Climax
Second	(United Kingdom) Innes Ireland	Lotus-Climax
Third	(United Kingdom) Graham Hill	BRM

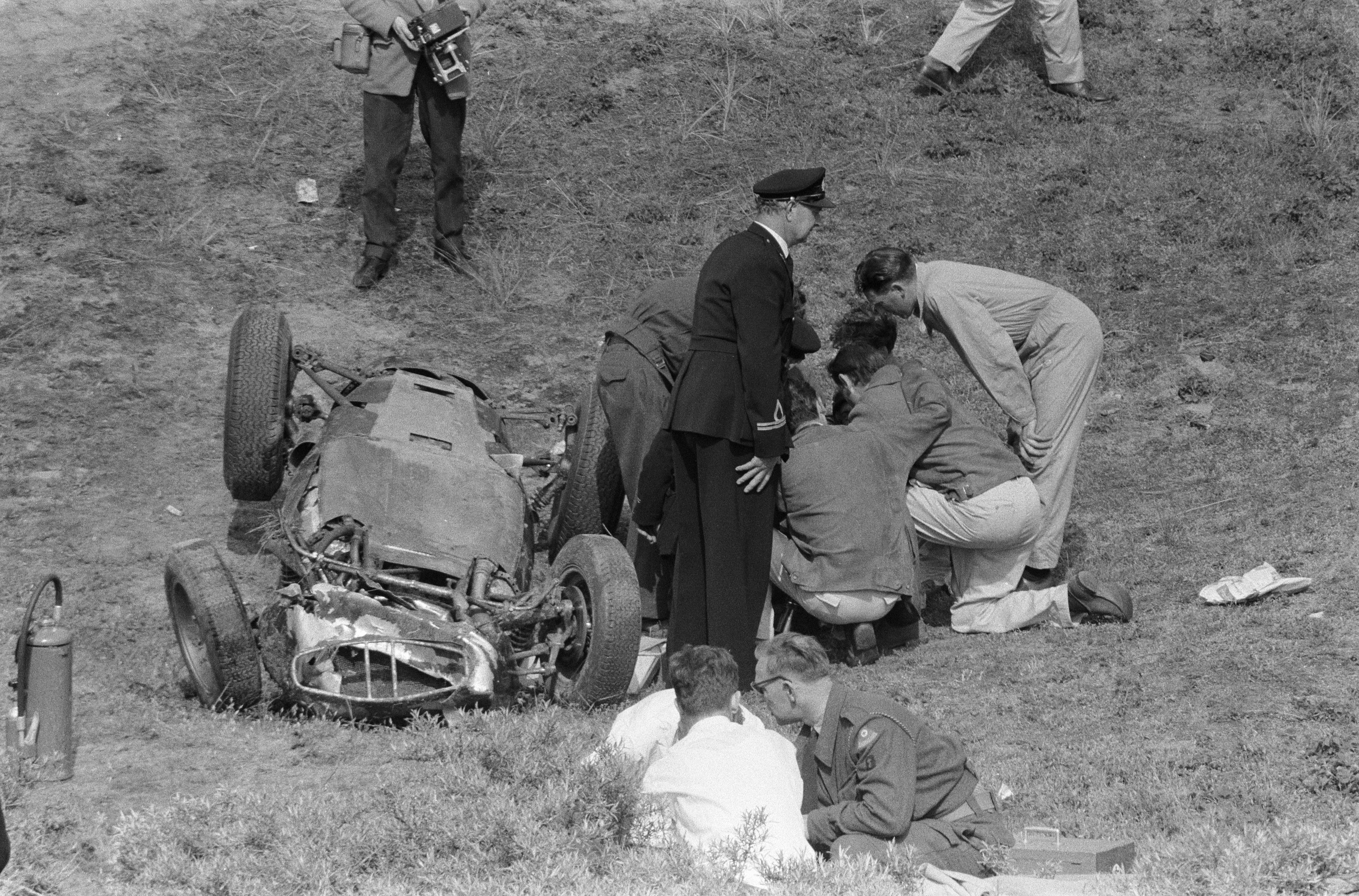
Dan Gurney's car after his accident, which killed a young spectator

The 1960 Dutch Grand Prix was a Formula One motor race held at Zandvoort on 6 June 1960. It was race 4 of 10 in the 1960 World Championship of Drivers and race 3 of 9 in the 1960 International Cup for Formula One Manufacturers.

Due to a crash by Dan Gurney, a spectator, who was in a prohibited area, was killed during this event.

== Classification ==
=== Qualifying ===
Pos	No	Driver	Constructor	Time	Gap
1	7	(United Kingdom) Stirling Moss	Lotus-Climax	1:33.2	—
2	11	(Australia) Jack Brabham	Cooper-Climax	1:33.4	+0.2
3	4	(United Kingdom) Innes Ireland	Lotus-Climax	1:33.9	+0.7
4	14	(Sweden) Jo Bonnier	BRM	1:34.3	+1.1
5	16	(United Kingdom) Graham Hill	BRM	1:35.1	+1.9
6	15	(United States) Dan Gurney	BRM	1:35.2	+2.0
7	8	(United Kingdom) Chris Bristow	Cooper-Climax	1:35.3	+2.1
8	5	(United Kingdom) Alan Stacey	Lotus-Climax	1:35.4	+2.2
9	12	(New Zealand) Bruce McLaren	Cooper-Climax	1:35.7	+2.5
10	9	(United Kingdom) Tony Brooks	Cooper-Climax	1:36.0	+2.8
11	6	(United Kingdom) Jim Clark	Lotus-Climax	1:36.3	+3.1
12	3	(United States) Richie Ginther	Ferrari	1:36.3	+3.1
13	1	(United States) Phil Hill	Ferrari	1:36.4	+3.2
14	10	(United Kingdom) Henry Taylor	Cooper-Climax	1:36.4	+3.2
15	2	(Germany) Wolfgang von Trips	Ferrari	1:36.7	+3.5
16	22	(United States) Chuck Daigh	Scarab	1:36.7	+3.5
17	19	(United States) Masten Gregory	Cooper-Maserati	1:37.3	+4.1
18	17	(United Kingdom) Roy Salvadori	Aston Martin	1:37.8	+4.6
19	18	(France) Maurice Trintignant	Cooper-Maserati	1:38.5	+5.3
20	21	(United States) Lance Reventlow	Scarab	1:38.8	+5.6
21	20	(Netherlands) Carel Godin de Beaufort	Cooper-Climax	1:41.7	+8.5

=== Race ===
Pos	No	Driver	Constructor	Laps	Time/Retired	Grid	Points
1	11	(Australia) Jack Brabham	Cooper-Climax	75	2:01:47.2	2	8
2	4	(United Kingdom) Innes Ireland	Lotus-Climax	75	+ 24.0	3	6
3	16	(United Kingdom) Graham Hill	BRM	75	+ 56.6	5	4
4	7	(United Kingdom) Stirling Moss	Lotus-Climax	75	+ 57.7	1	3
5	2	(Germany) Wolfgang von Trips	Ferrari	74	+ 1 Lap	15	2
6	3	(United States) Richie Ginther	Ferrari	74	+ 1 Lap	12	1
7	10	(United Kingdom) Henry Taylor	Cooper-Climax	70	+ 5 Laps	14	
8	20	(Netherlands) Carel Godin de Beaufort	Cooper-Climax	69	+ 6 Laps	18	
Ret	5	(United Kingdom) Alan Stacey	Lotus-Climax	57	Transmission	8	
Ret	14	(Sweden) Jo Bonnier	BRM	54	Engine / Accident	4	
Ret	1	(United States) Phil Hill	Ferrari	54	Engine	13	
Ret	6	(United Kingdom) Jim Clark	Lotus-Climax	42	Transmission	11	
Ret	18	(France) Maurice Trintignant	Cooper-Maserati	39	Gearbox	17	
Ret	15	(United States) Dan Gurney	BRM	11	Brakes / Accident	6	
Ret	8	(United Kingdom) Chris Bristow	Cooper-Climax	9	Engine	7	
Ret	12	(New Zealand) Bruce McLaren	Cooper-Climax	8	Transmission	9	
Ret	9	(United Kingdom) Tony Brooks	Cooper-Climax	4	Gearbox	10	
DNS	17	(United Kingdom) Roy Salvadori	Aston Martin		Non Starter		
DNS	19	(United States) Masten Gregory	Cooper-Maserati		Non Starter		
DNS	21	(United States) Lance Reventlow	Scarab		Non Starter		
DNS	22	(United States) Chuck Daigh	Scarab		Non Starter		

== Additional information ==
- This was the Formula One World Championship debut for future double World Champion Jim Clark.
- Lotus achieved their first of many fastest laps in their long history.

== Championship standings after the race ==
Drivers' Championship standings

	Pos	Driver	Points
	1	(New Zealand) Bruce McLaren	14
	2	(United Kingdom) Stirling Moss	11
	3	(United States) Jim Rathmann	8
22	4	(Australia) Jack Brabham	8
9	5	(United Kingdom) Innes Ireland	7

Constructors' Championship standings

	Pos	Constructor	Points
	1	(United Kingdom) Cooper-Climax	22
1	2	(United Kingdom) Lotus-Climax	15
1	3	(Italy) Ferrari	12
1	4	(United Kingdom) BRM	6
1	5	(United Kingdom) Cooper-Maserati	3

- Notes: Only the top five positions are included for both sets of standings.

Previous race: 1960 Indianapolis 500	FIA Formula One World Championship; 1960 season	Next race: 1960 Belgian Grand Prix
Previous race: 1959 Dutch Grand Prix	Dutch Grand Prix	Next race: 1961 Dutch Grand Prix
