= Alan Stacey =

British racing driver (1933–1960)

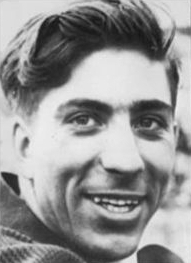
- Born: 29 August 1933; Broomfield, Essex, England
- Died: 19 June 1960 (aged 26); Circuit de Spa-Francorchamps, Liège, Belgium

Formula One World Championship career
- Nationality: (United Kingdom) British
- Active years: 1958–1960
- Team: Lotus
- Entries: 7
- Championships: 0
- Wins: 0
- Podiums: 0
- Career points: 0
- Pole positions: 0
- Fastest laps: 0
- First entry: 1958 British Grand Prix
- Last entry: 1960 Belgian Grand Prix

Alan Stacey (29 August 1933 – 19 June 1960) was a British racing driver. He began his association with Lotus when he built one of the MkVI kits then being offered by the company. Having raced this car he went on to build an Eleven, eventually campaigning it at Le Mans under the Team Lotus umbrella. During the following years he spent much time developing the Lotus Grand Prix cars, most notably the front-engined 16 and then the 18. He participated in seven Formula One World Championship Grands Prix, debuting on 19 July 1958. He scored no championship points. He also participated in several non-championship Formula One races.

Stacey was an amputee, racing with an artificial lower right leg due to a motorcycle accident when he was 17.

== Sports cars ==
Stacey competed successfully in many sports car races driving Lotus cars, initially as a private entrant in his own car and later for Team Lotus. He drove with Peter Ashdown in a 1098cc Lotus Eleven in the 1957 24 Hours of Le Mans but they failed to finish. He drove a Lotus XV-Climax to victory at Aintree, in a July 1959 race for sports cars of 1400cc to two litres. His time was 37 minutes 39.4 seconds.

== Formula One ==
Stacey made his Formula One debut for Team Lotus at the 1958 British Grand Prix. He was promoted to a full-time role in 1960. Stacey's best race came at the 1960 Dutch Grand Prix, where he ran third for a majority of the race, before retiring on lap 57 due to transmission failure.

Due to his disability, Stacey had a motorcycle throttle on the gear-lever during his time at Team Lotus. Friend and journalist Jabby Crombac believed it put him at a considerable disadvantage at Formula One level, due to the more precise throttle control the cars needed compared to lower-formula cars.

Stacey's driving was "conservative" according to one observer.

== Death ==
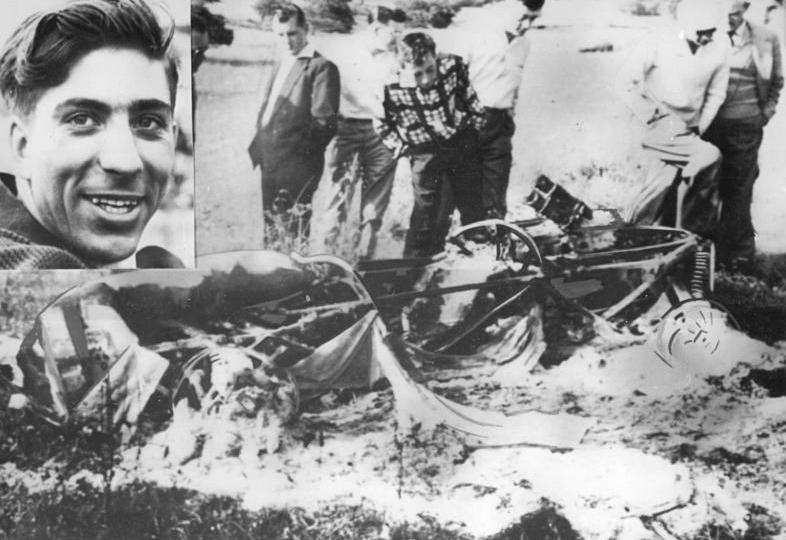
The remains of Alan Stacey's car after his fatal accident in the 1960 Belgian Grand Prix. In the inset, Stacey before the race.

Stacey was killed during the 1960 Belgian Grand Prix, at Spa-Francorchamps, when he crashed at 120 mph (190 km/h) after being hit in the face by a bird on lap 25, while lying sixth in his Lotus 18-Climax (the same type Lotus as Stirling Moss, Jim Clark and Innes Ireland).

Stacey's car went off the road on the inside of the fast, sweeping right-hand Burneville curve (the same corner where Moss crashed the previous day). Stacey died within a few minutes of Chris Bristow, and within a few hundred feet of that wreck. In a mid-1980s edition of Road & Track magazine, Stacey's friend and teammate Innes Ireland wrote an article about Stacey's death, in which he stated some spectators claimed a bird had flown into Stacey's face while he was approaching the curve, possibly knocking him unconscious, or even possibly killing him by breaking his neck or inflicting a fatal head injury, before the car crashed.

== More recently ==
Stacey's original Lotus Mk VI was purchased from its owner by the Stacey Family and underwent complete, but sympathetic restoration in the hands of Stacey's schoolfriend, VSCC, Bentley Drivers Club and Historic Grand Prix Drivers Association racer, Ian Bentall, who had originally helped construct the car. The Lotus is still in the hands of the Stacey Family where it makes occasional appearances on the track.

== Complete Formula One World Championship results ==
(key)

Year	Entrant	Chassis	Engine	1	2	3	4	5	6	7	8	9	10	11	WDC	Pts.
1958	Team Lotus	Lotus 16	Climax L4	ARG	MON	NED	500	BEL	FRA	GBR; Ret	GER	POR	ITA	MOR	NC	0
1959	Team Lotus	Lotus 16	Climax L4	MON	500	NED	FRA	GBR; 8	GER	POR	ITA	USA; Ret			NC	0
1960	Team Lotus	Lotus 16	Climax L4	ARG; Ret											NC	0
1960	Team Lotus	Lotus 18	Climax L4		MON; Ret	500	NED; Ret	BEL; Ret	FRA	GBR	POR	ITA	USA		NC	0

=== Non-championship results ===
(key) (Races in bold indicate pole position) (Races in italics indicate fastest lap)

Year	Entrant	Chassis	Engine	1	2	3	4	5	6
1959	Team Lotus	Lotus 16 (F2)	Climax L4	BUE	GLV	AIN; DNA	INT	OUL	SIL
1960	?	Maserati 250F	Maserati straight-6	BUE; Ret					
1960	Team Lotus	Lotus 16	Climax L4		GLV; Ret	INT; 4	SIL	LOM	OUL

Preceded by Chris Bristow	Formula One fatal accidents 19 June 1960	Succeeded by Giulio Cabianca
