= Dave Charlton =

South African racing driver (1936–2013)

- Born: 27 October 1936; Brotton, Yorkshire, UK
- Died: 24 February 2013 (aged 76); Johannesburg, South Africa

Formula One World Championship career
- Nationality: (South Africa) South African
- Active years: 1965, 1967–1968, 1970–1975
- Team(s): Brabham, non-works McLaren and Lotus
- Entries: 14 (11 starts)
- Championships: 0
- Wins: 0
- Podiums: 0
- Career points: 0
- Pole positions: 0
- Fastest laps: 0
- First entry: 1965 South African Grand Prix
- Last entry: 1975 South African Grand Prix

David William Charlton (27 October 1936 – 24 February 2013) was a racing driver from South Africa.

Charlton was born in Brotton, Yorkshire. After World War II, his family emigrated to Springs, a town outside Johannesburg. He participated in 13 World Championship Formula One Grands Prix, debuting on 1 January 1965. He scored no championship points. He competed in many non-World Championship Formula One races, winning the South African Formula One Championship six times in succession from 1970 to 1975.

Charlton died in Johannesburg, South Africa on 24 February 2013, aged 76.

== Complete Formula One World Championship results ==
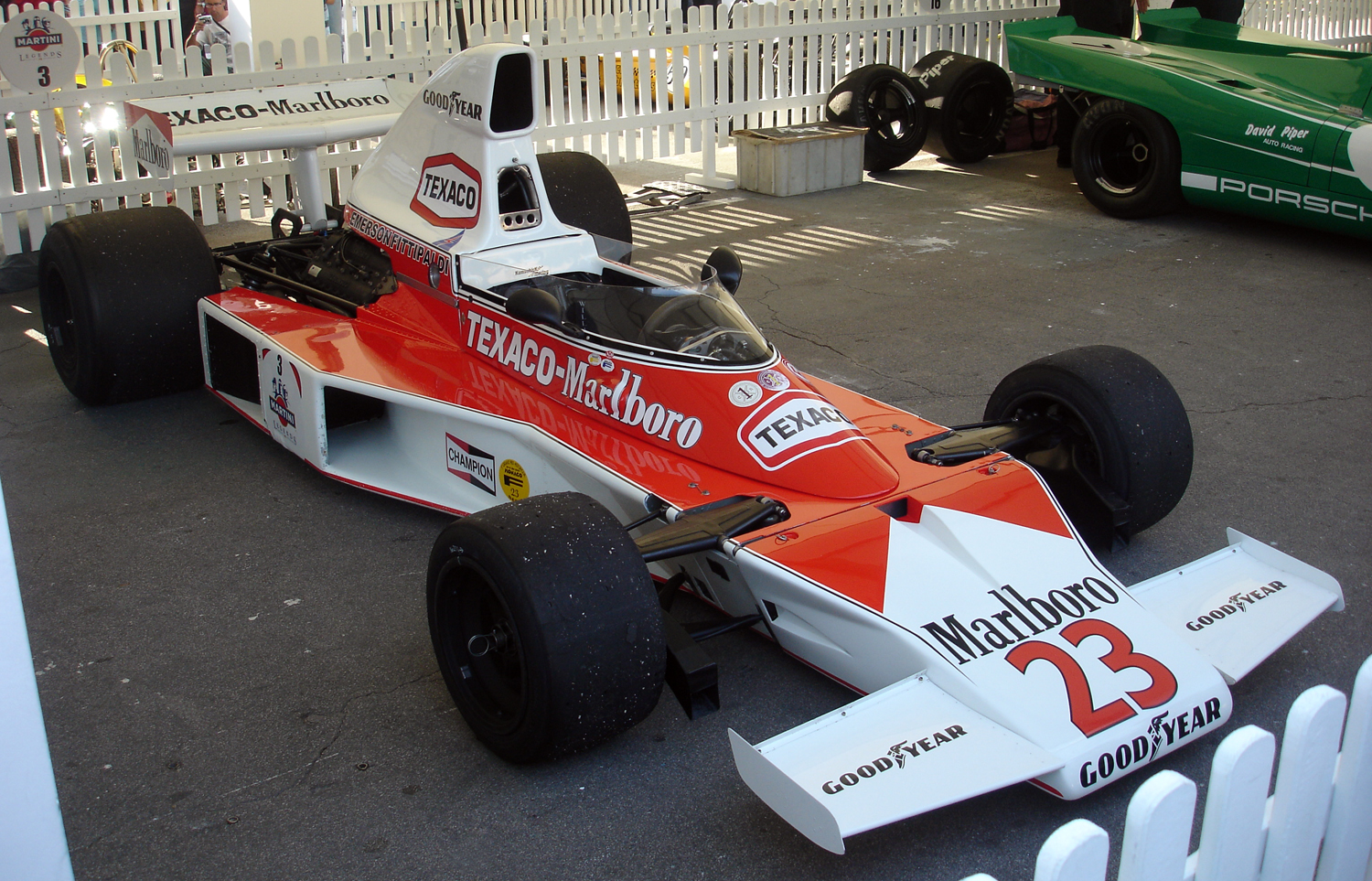
Charlton drove the McLaren M23 of car number 23 during the 1974 South African Grand Prix.

(key) (Races in bold indicate pole position)

Year	Entrant	Chassis	Engine	1	2	3	4	5	6	7	8	9	10	11	12	13	14	15	WDC	Points
1965	Ecurie Tomahawk	Lotus 20	Ford Straight-4	RSA; DNPQ	MON	BEL	FRA	GBR	NED	GER	ITA	USA	MEX						NC	0
1967	Scuderia Scribante	Brabham BT11	Coventry Climax	RSA; NC	MON	NED	BEL	FRA	GBR	GER	CAN	ITA	USA	MEX					NC	0
1968	Scuderia Scribante	Brabham BT11	Repco-Brabham V8	RSA; Ret	ESP	MON	BEL	NED	FRA	GBR	GER	ITA	CAN	USA	MEX				NC	0
1970	Scuderia Scribante	Lotus 49C	Ford Cosworth DFV	RSA; 12	ESP	MON	BEL	NED	FRA	GBR	GER	AUT	ITA	CAN	USA	MEX			NC	0
1971	Scribante Lucky Strike Racing	Brabham BT33	Ford Cosworth DFV	RSA; Ret	ESP	MON													NC	0
1971	Gold Leaf Team Lotus	Lotus 72D	Ford Cosworth DFV				NED; DNS	FRA	GBR; Ret	GER	AUT	ITA	CAN	USA					NC	0
1972	Scribante Lucky Strike Racing	Lotus 72D	Ford Cosworth DFV	ARG	RSA; Ret	ESP	MON	BEL	FRA; DNQ	GBR; Ret	GER; Ret	AUT	ITA	CAN	USA				NC	0
1973	Scribante Lucky Strike Racing	Lotus 72D	Ford Cosworth DFV	ARG	BRA	RSA; Ret	ESP	BEL	MON	SWE	FRA	GBR	NED	GER	AUT	ITA	CAN	USA	NC	0
1974	Scribante Lucky Strike Racing	McLaren M23	Ford Cosworth DFV	ARG	BRA	RSA; 19	ESP	BEL	MON	SWE	NED	FRA	GBR	GER	AUT	ITA	CAN	USA	NC	0
1975	Lucky Strike Racing	McLaren M23	Ford Cosworth DFV	ARG	BRA	RSA; 14	ESP	MON	BEL	SWE	NED	FRA	GBR	GER	AUT	ITA	USA		NC	0

== Complete Formula One non-championship results ==
(key) (Races in bold indicate pole position)

Year	Entrant	Chassis	Engine	1	2	3	4	5	6	7	8	9	10	11	12	13	14	15	16	17	18	19	20
1962	Ecurie Tomahawk	Lotus 20	Ford Straight-4	CAP	BRX	LOM	LAV	GLV	PAU	AIN	INT	NAP	MAL	CLP	RMS	SOL	KAN	MED	DAN	OUL	MEX	RAN; DNQ	NAT; DNQ
1963	Ecurie Tomahawk	Lotus 20	Ford Straight-4	LOM	GLV	PAU	IMO	SYR	AIN	INT	ROM	SOL	KAN	MED	AUT	OUL	RAN; 14						
1964	Ecurie Tomahawk	Lotus 20	Ford Straight-4	DMT	NWT	SYR	AIN	INT	SOL	MED	RAN; DNS												
1965	Ecurie Tomahawk	Lotus 20	Ford Straight-4	CAP; DNA	ROC	SYR	SMT	INT	MED	RAN; DNS													
1966	Scuderia Scribante	Brabham BT11	Coventry Climax	RSA; 4	SYR	INT	OUL																

Sporting positions
Preceded by John Love	South African Formula One Championship; Champion; 1970-1975	Succeeded by Ian Scheckter (Formula Atlantic)
