= Scuderia Scribante =

- Full name: (South Africa) Scuderia Scribante; Lucky Strike Racing
- Base: South Africa
- Founder(s): Aldo Scribante
- Noted staff: Alex Blignaut
- Noted drivers: (South Africa) Neville Lederle (South Africa) Dave Charlton

Formula One World Championship career
- First entry: 1962 South African Grand Prix
- Races entered: 13
- Drivers' Championships: 0
- Race victories: 0
- Pole positions: 0
- Fastest laps: 0
- Final entry: 1975 South African Grand Prix

Scuderia Scribante, also known as Neville Lederle Team and Lucky Strike Racing, was a South African F1 entrant established in 1961. The team was co-founded by South African driver Neville Lederle and Aldo Scribante, an Italian immigrant who owned a construction company in Johannesburg. The team mostly competed in the South African Grand Prix from 1962 to 1975. After fielding a Lotus customer car, Scribante ran Jack Brabham on the occasion of the Rand Grand Prix in 1965. Brabham won the non-championship race, and Scribante agreed on switching to Brabham cars for the following two seasons. In 1970 Scribante returned to Lotus and purchased the Lotus 49 who had won the Formula One World Championship with Graham Hill in 1968. The very same year Dave Charlton won the South African Formula One Championship, the first of six consecutive titles. In 1972 the team decided to enter three European Formula One races with scarce results.

In 1975 Aldo Scribante founded the Aldo Scribante Circuit in Port Elizabeth.

== Complete Formula One World Championship results ==
(key) (Results in bold indicate pole position; results in italics indicate fastest lap.)

Year	Chassis	Engine(s)	Tyres	Drivers	1	2	3	4	5	6	7	8	9	10	11	12	13	14	15
1962	Lotus 21	Climax FPF 1.5 V8	D		NED	MON	BEL	FRA	GBR	GER	ITA	USA	RSA						
1962	Lotus 21	Climax FPF 1.5 V8	D	(South Africa) Neville Lederle									6						
1965	Lotus 21	Climax FPF 1.5 V8	D		RSA	MON	BEL	FRA	GBR	NED	GER	ITA	USA	MEX					
1965	Lotus 21	Climax FPF 1.5 V8	D	(South Africa) Neville Lederle	DNQ														
1967	Brabham BT11	Climax FPF 2.8 L4	F		RSA	MON	NED	BEL	FRA	GBR	GER	CAN	ITA	USA	MEX				
1967	Brabham BT11	Climax FPF 2.8 L4	F	(South Africa) Dave Charlton	NC														
1968	Brabham BT11	Repco 620 3.0 V8	F		RSA	ESP	MON	BEL	NED	FRA	GBR	GER	ITA	CAN	USA	MEX			
1968	Brabham BT11	Repco 620 3.0 V8	F	(South Africa) Dave Charlton	Ret														
1970	Lotus 49C	Ford Cosworth DFV 3.0 V8	F		RSA	ESP	MON	BEL	NED	FRA	GBR	GER	AUT	ITA	CAN	USA	MEX		
1970	Lotus 49C	Ford Cosworth DFV 3.0 V8	F	(South Africa) Dave Charlton	12														
1971	Brabham BT33	Ford Cosworth DFV 3.0 V8	G		RSA	ESP	MON	NED	FRA	GBR	GER	AUT	ITA	CAN	USA				
1971	Brabham BT33	Ford Cosworth DFV 3.0 V8	G	(South Africa) Dave Charlton	Ret														
1972	Lotus 72D	Ford Cosworth DFV 3.0 V8	F		ARG	RSA	ESP	MON	BEL	FRA	GBR	GER	AUT	ITA	CAN	USA			
1972	Lotus 72D	Ford Cosworth DFV 3.0 V8	F	(South Africa) Dave Charlton		Ret				DNQ	Ret	Ret							
1973	Lotus 72D	Ford Cosworth DFV 3.0 V8	F		ARG	BRA	RSA	ESP	BEL	MON	SWE	FRA	GBR	NED	GER	AUT	ITA	CAN	USA
1973	Lotus 72D	Ford Cosworth DFV 3.0 V8	F	(South Africa) Dave Charlton			Ret												
1974	McLaren M23	Ford Cosworth DFV 3.0 V8	G		ARG	BRA	RSA	ESP	BEL	MON	SWE	NED	FRA	GBR	GER	AUT	ITA	CAN	USA
1974	McLaren M23	Ford Cosworth DFV 3.0 V8	G	(South Africa) Dave Charlton			19												
1975	McLaren M23	Ford Cosworth DFV 3.0 V8	G		ARG	BRA	RSA	ESP	MON	BEL	SWE	NED	FRA	GBR	GER	AUT	ITA	USA	
1975	McLaren M23	Ford Cosworth DFV 3.0 V8	G	(South Africa) Dave Charlton			14												
