= Brian Raubenheimer =

South African racing driver

- Born: 19 July 1940; Pietermaritzburg, South Africa
- Died: 21 June 2021 (aged 80); Howick, South Africa

Formula One World Championship career
- Nationality: (South Africa) South African
- Active years: 1965
- Team: non-works Lotus
- Entries: 1 (0 starts)
- Championships: 0
- Wins: 0
- Podiums: 0
- Career points: 0
- Pole positions: 0
- Fastest laps: 0
- First entry: 1965 South African Grand Prix
- Last entry: 1965 South African Grand Prix

Brian Raubenheimer (19 July 1940 – 21 June 2021) was a South African racing driver from Pietermaritzburg. He attempted to make his Formula One debut in 1965 South African Grand Prix, but withdrew following practice having suffered a gearbox problem.

Raubenheimer remained a car enthusiast and is considered the "father" of the Mini Marcos in South Africa.

Raubenheimer died on 21 June 2021, aged 80.

== Complete Formula One World Championship results ==
(key)

Year	Entrant	Chassis	Engine	1	2	3	4	5	6	7	8	9	10	WDC	Points
1965	Brian Raubenheimer	Lotus 20	Ford 109E 1.4 L4	RSA; WD	MON	BEL	FRA	GBR	NED	GER	ITA	USA	MEX	NC	0

== Complete Formula One non-championship results ==
(key)

Year	Entrant	Chassis	Engine	1	2	3	4
1966	Brian Raubenheimer	Lotus 20	Ford 109E 1.4 L4	RSA; DNS	SYR	INT	OUL
