= Lotus 20 =

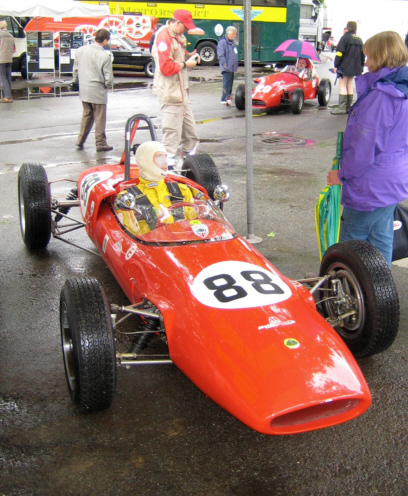

Overview
- Manufacturer: Team Lotus
- Production: 1961-62

Body and chassis
- Class: Formula Junior
- Body style: Open wheel

Powertrain
- Engine: 1098 cc Cosworth Mk.IV

Chronology
- Predecessor: Lotus 18
- Successor: Lotus 22

The Lotus 20 is a Formula Junior car built by Lotus for the 1961 season as a successor to the Lotus 18.

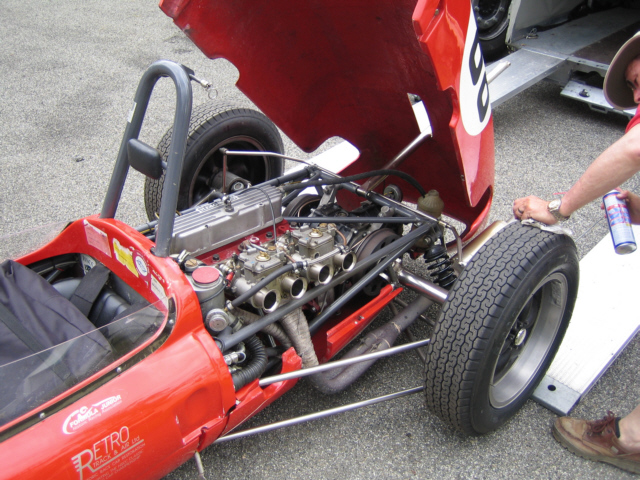
1962 Lotus 20

The chassis is a spaceframe, clothed in fibreglass bodywork. It has front double wishbone suspension, but the rear had a lower wishbone with the driveshaft being fixed length and therefore used as a top link. Originally fitted with Alfin drum brakes at all four corners, it was soon upgraded to discs in front and inboard drums at the rear. Equipped as standard with the Cosworth Mk.IV engine and with either a Renault Dauphine gearbox or Hewland-modified VW box.

Compared with the Lotus 18, the 20 has a much reduced frontal area and lower centre of gravity, aided by the fact the driving position was reclined so the driver was nearly lying down, compared with being more upright in the Lotus 18.

A 1962 Lotus 20 can be found hanging from the ceiling on the first floor at the Canadian Automotive Museum.

== Lotus 20B ==
The 20B was mostly the same as the 20, but with sway bar and stock inboard drum brakes in the rear. Occasionally, 20Bs ran with Lotus TwinCam, and therefore didn't race as a Formula Junior, but as Formula Libre and in other series such as the Tasman series.

Two Lotus 20s were entered in the 1965 South African Grand Prix for Dave Charlton and Brian Raubenheimer but Charlton failed to pre-qualify and Raubenheimer withdrew after his car's clutch broke in practice.

== Complete Formula One World Championship results ==
Year	Entrant	Engine	Tyres	Driver	1	2	3	4	5	6	7	8	9	10	Points	WCC
1965	Ecurie Tomahawk	Ford 109E 1.5 L4	D		RSA	MON	BEL	FRA	GBR	NED	GER	ITA	USA	MEX	0	NC
1965	Ecurie Tomahawk	Ford 109E 1.5 L4	D	(South Africa) Dave Charlton	DNPQ										0	NC
1965	Brian Raubenheimer	Ford 109E 1.5 L4	D	(South Africa) Brian Raubenheimer	WD										0	NC
