= Brabham BT11 =

Formula One racing car

Repco Brabham BT11
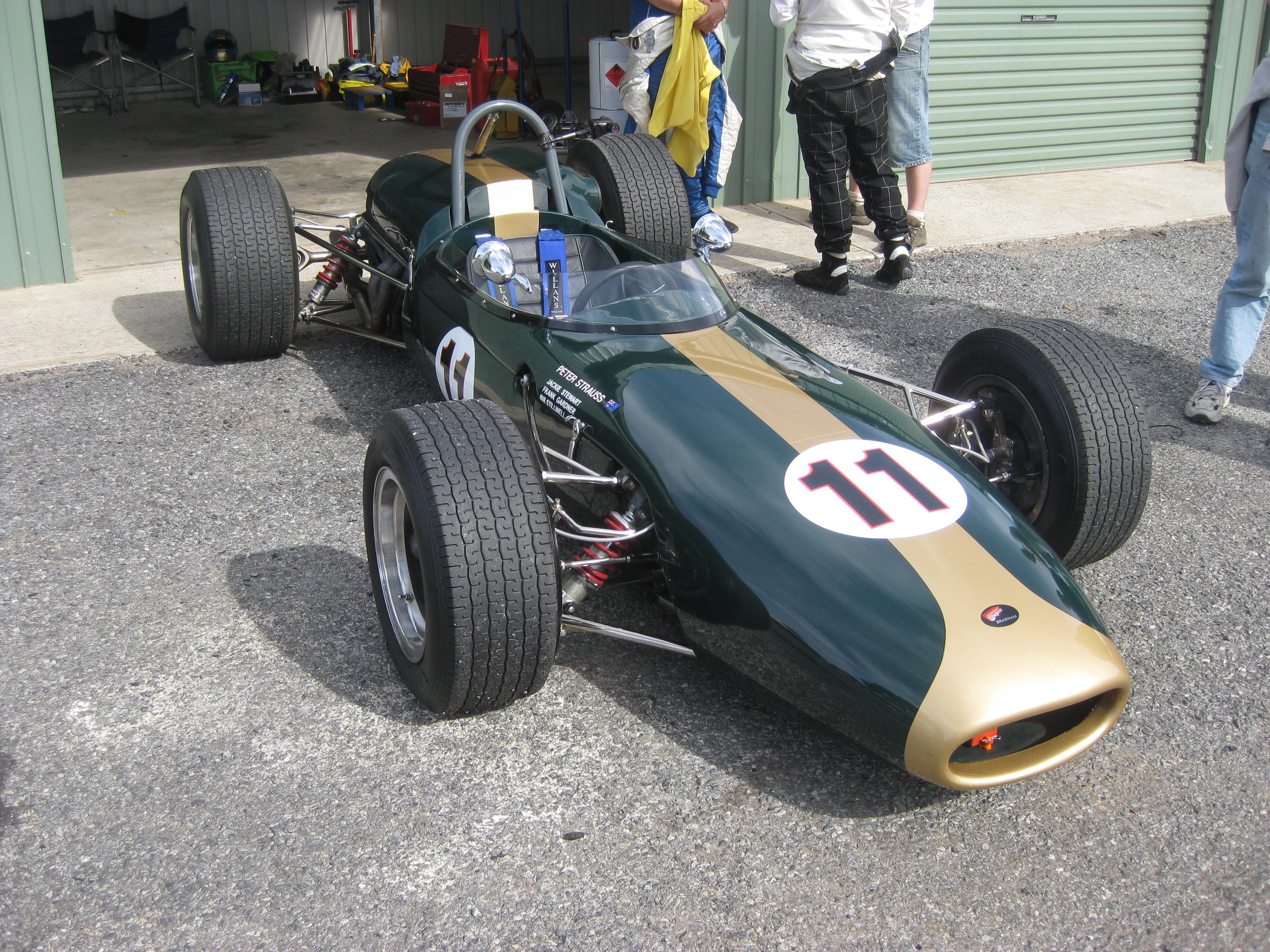
- Category: Formula One
- Constructor: Motor Racing Developments
- Designer: Ron Tauranac
- Predecessor: Brabham BT7
- Successor: Brabham BT19

Technical specifications
- Chassis: Steel spaceframe
- Engine: Coventry Climax / BRM / Repco naturally aspirated, mid-engine, longitudinally mounted
- Transmission: Hewland, 5 speed manual
- Weight: 460 kg (1,014.1 lb)
- Fuel: Esso, Sasol
- Tyres: Dunlop, Goodyear, Firestone

Competition history
- Notable entrants: Brabham Racing Organisation; Rob Walker Racing Team; DW Racing Enterprises; Siffert Racing Team
- Notable drivers: (Australia) Jack Brabham (United States) Dan Gurney (New Zealand) Denny Hulme (Austria) Jochen Rindt (Switzerland) Jo Siffert (United Kingdom) Bob Anderson (New Zealand) Chris Amon
- Debut: 1964 Monaco Grand Prix
Races	Wins	Podiums	Poles	F/Laps
33	0	8	0	1
- Constructors' Championships: 0
- Drivers' Championships: 0
- Unless otherwise stated, all data refer to Formula One World Championship Grands Prix only.

The Brabham BT11 (also known as Repco Brabham BT11) is a Formula One racing car built in 1964, mainly for use by privateers in grand prix racing, but was also used by the Brabham works team during 1964 and 1965. It was the only competitive car of the period available to privateers, recording eight podium finishes in total. The car's best results came at consecutive events in the United States and Mexico 1965, with Dan Gurney qualifying and finishing second in the latter.

It was in a BT11 that 1970 World Champion Jochen Rindt debuted in Grand Prix racing. John Taylor however died four weeks after suffering severe burns in an accident with Jacky Ickx's Matra at the 1966 German Grand Prix.

The BT11 was also raced in the popular off season Tasman Series.

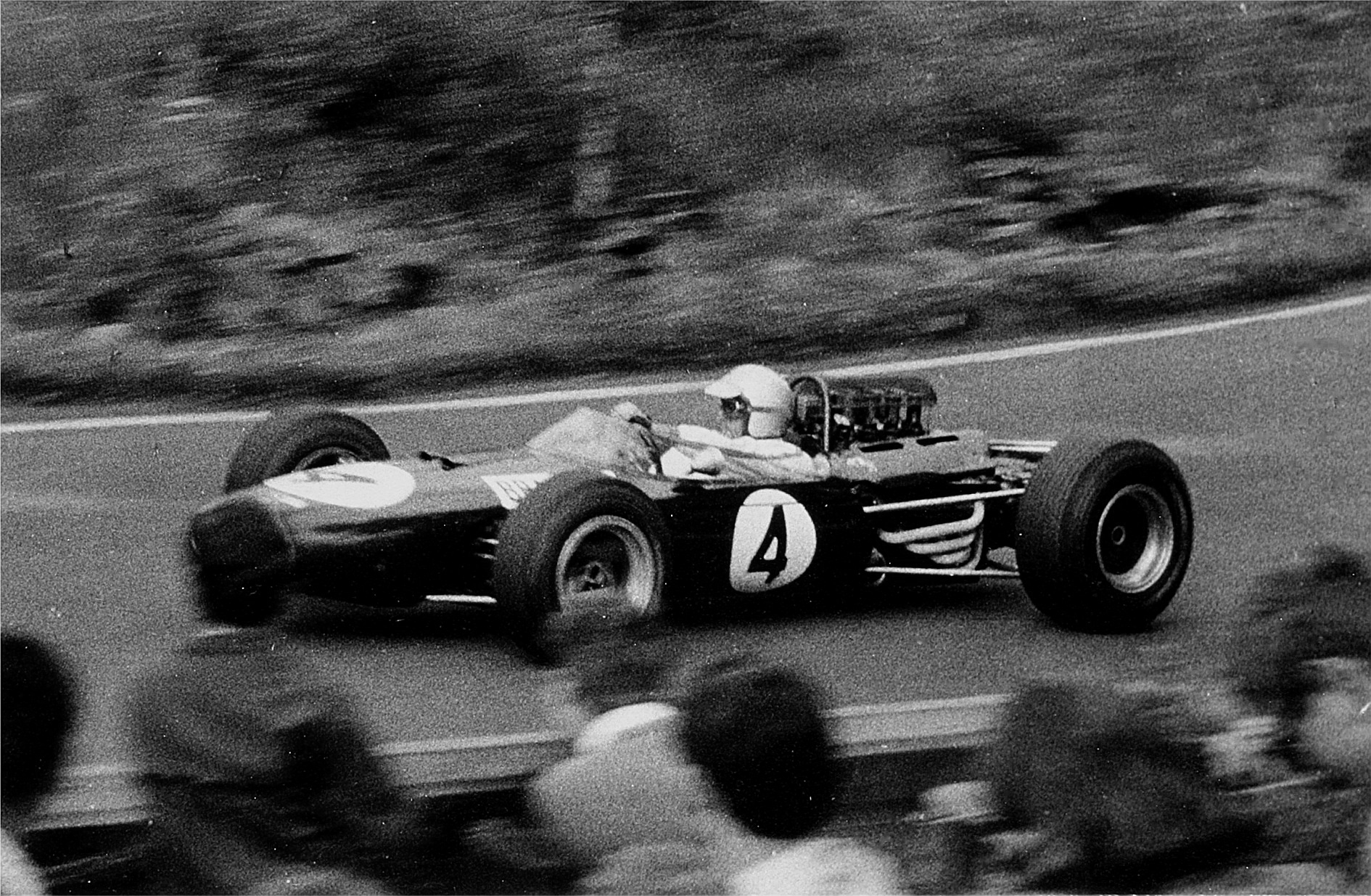
Jack Brabham driving a BT11 at the 1965 German Grand Prix.

== Complete Formula One World Championship results ==
(key) (results in bold indicate pole position, results in italics indicate fastest laps)

Year	Team	Engine	Tyres	Drivers	1	2	3	4	5	6	7	8	9	10	11	12	Points^{1}	WCC
1964	Brabham Racing Organisation	Climax FWMV V8	**D**		MON	NED	BEL	FRA	GBR	GER	AUT	ITA	USA	MEX			**30**^{2}	4th
1964	Brabham Racing Organisation	Climax FWMV V8	**D**	Jack Brabham							9	14	Ret	Ret			**30**^{2}	4th
1964	DW Racing Enterprises	Climax FWMV V8	**D**	Bob Anderson	7	6	DNS	12	7	Ret	3	11					**30**^{2}	4th
1964	RRC Walker Racing Team	BRM P56 V8	**D**	Jo Bonnier		9	Ret		Ret	Ret							**7**	6th
1964	RRC Walker Racing Team	BRM P56 V8	**D**	Jochen Rindt							Ret						**7**	6th
1964	RRC Walker Racing Team	BRM P56 V8	**D**	"Geki"								DNQ					**7**	6th
1964	RRC Walker Racing Team	BRM P56 V8	**D**	Hap Sharp									NC	13			**7**	6th
1964	RRC Walker Racing Team	BRM P56 V8	**D**	Jo Siffert									3	Ret			**7**	6th
1964	Siffert Racing Team	BRM P56 V8	**D**	Jo Siffert		13	Ret	Ret	11	4	Ret	7					**7**	6th
1965	Brabham Racing Organisation	Climax FWMV V8	**G**		RSA	MON	BEL	FRA	GBR	NED	GER	ITA	USA	MEX			**27 (31)**	3rd
1965	Brabham Racing Organisation	Climax FWMV V8	**G**	Jack Brabham	8	Ret	4		DNS		5		3	Ret			**27 (31)**	3rd
1965	Brabham Racing Organisation	Climax FWMV V8	**G**	Denny Hulme				4		5		Ret					**27 (31)**	3rd
1965	Brabham Racing Organisation	Climax FWMV V8	**G**	Dan Gurney	Ret		10	Ret	6	3	3	3	2	2			**27 (31)**	3rd
1965	DW Racing Enterprises	Climax FWMV V8	**D**	Bob Anderson	NC	9	DNS	9	Ret	Ret	DNS						**27 (31)**	3rd
1965	RRC Walker Racing Team	BRM P56 V8	**D**	Jo Siffert	7	6	8	6	9	13	Ret	Ret	11	4			**5**	7th
1965	John Willment Automobiles	BRM P56 V8	**D**	Frank Gardner	12	Ret	Ret		8	11	Ret	Ret					**5**	7th
1966	RRC Walker Racing Team	BRM P60 V8	**D**		MON	BEL	FRA	GBR	NED	GER	ITA	USA	MEX				**1**	11th
1966	RRC Walker Racing Team	BRM P60 V8	**D**	Jo Siffert	Ret												**1**	11th
1966	David Bridges	BRM P60 V8	**G**	John Taylor			6	8	8	Ret							**1**	11th
1966	Chris Amon Racing	BRM P60 V8	**D**	Chris Amon							DNQ						**1**	11th
1966	DW Racing Enterprises	Climax FPF L4	**F**	Bob Anderson	Ret		7	NC	Ret	Ret	6						**1**	10th
1967	DW Racing Enterprises	Climax FPF L4	**F**		RSA	MON	NED	BEL	FRA	GBR	GER	CAN	ITA	USA	MEX		**2**	11th
1967	DW Racing Enterprises	Climax FPF L4	**F**	Bob Anderson	5	DNQ	9	8	Ret	Ret							**2**	11th
1967	Scuderia Scribante	Climax FPF L4	?	Dave Charlton	NC												**2**	11th
1967	Luki Botha	Climax FPF L4	?	Luki Botha	NC												**2**	11th
1968	Scuderia Scribante	Repco 620 V8	**F**		RSA	ESP	MON	BEL	NED	FRA	GBR	GER	ITA	CAN	USA	MEX	**10**^{3}	8th
1968	Scuderia Scribante	Repco 620 V8	**F**	Dave Charlton	Ret												**10**^{3}	8th
1968	Team Pretoria	Climax FPF L4	**F**	Jackie Pretorius	NC												**0**	NC

^{1} Points were awarded on a 9–6–4–3–2–1 basis for the first six positions at each round. Only the best placed car from each chassis manufacturer-engine manufacturer combination at each round was eligible to score points. Not all rounds could be counted towards the championship:

- In 1964 and 1965, only the best six round results were retained.
- In 1966 only the best five round results were retained.
- In 1967, the best five results from the first six rounds and the best four results from the last five rounds were retained.
- In 1968, the best five results from the first six rounds and the best five results from the last six rounds were retained.

Numbers without parentheses are Championship points; numbers in parentheses are total points scored.
^{2} In 1964, 5 of Brabham-Climax's points were scored using the BT11; the remaining 25 points were scored using a BT7
^{3} In 1968, all of Brabham-Repco's points were scored using BT20, BT24 and BT26 models
