= Roberto Bussinello =

Italian racing driver (1927–1999)

- Born: 4 October 1927; Pistoia, Italy
- Died: 24 August 1999 (aged 71); Vicenza, Italy

Formula One World Championship career
- Nationality: (Italy) Italian
- Active years: 1961, 1965
- Team(s): De Tomaso; Non-works BRM
- Entries: 3 (2 starts)
- Championships: 0
- Wins: 0
- Podiums: 0
- Career points: 0
- Pole positions: 0
- Fastest laps: 0
- First entry: 1961 Italian Grand Prix
- Last entry: 1965 Italian Grand Prix

Roberto Bussinello (4 October 1927 – 24 August 1999) was a racing driver from Italy.

Bussinello participated in three Formula One World Championship Grands Prix, debuting on 10 September 1961. He scored no championship points. He also participated in several non-Championship Formula One races.

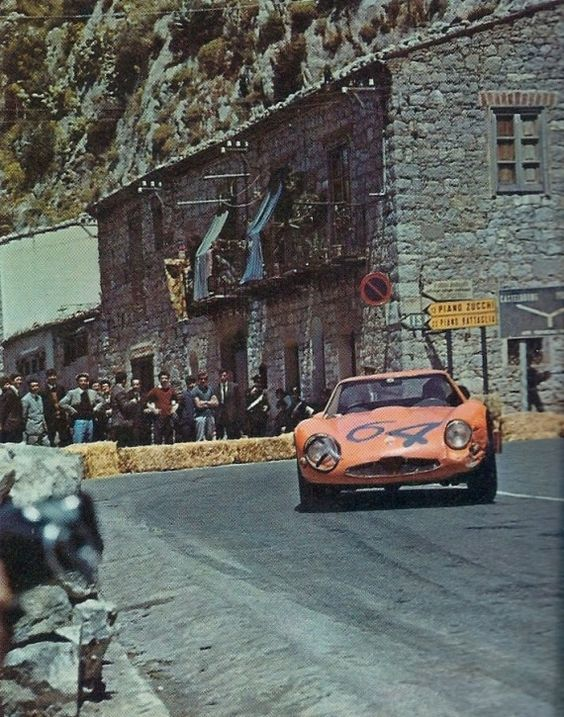
Bussinello driving the Alfa Romeo Giulia TZ2 at the 1965 Targa Florio, here at Collesano.

Bussinello travelled to Australia in 1964 for a production car race at the Sandown Park circuit in Melbourne. Teaming with Australian driver Ralph Sachs in an Alec Mildren Racing Alfa Romeo Giulia TI Super, Bussinello would win the 1964 Sandown 6 Hour International. The race was the forerunner of what would become the Sandown 500.

== Career record ==
=== Complete Formula One World Championship results ===
(key)

Year	Entrant	Chassis	Engine	1	2	3	4	5	6	7	8	9	10	WDC	Points
1961	Isobele de Tomaso	De Tomaso F1	Alfa Romeo Straight-4	MON	NED	BEL	FRA	GBR	GER	ITA; Ret	USA			NC	0
1965	Scuderia Centro Sud	BRM P57	BRM V8	RSA	MON	BEL	FRA	GBR	NED	GER; DNQ	ITA; 13	USA	MEX	NC	0

=== Complete British Saloon Car Championship results ===
(key) (Races in bold indicate pole position; races in italics indicate fastest lap.)

Year	Team	Car	Class	1	2	3	4	5	6	7	8	9	10	DC	Pts	Class
1967	Autodelta S.p.A.	Alfa Romeo 1600 GTA	C	BRH	SNE; Ret	SIL	SIL	MAL	SIL	SIL	BRH	OUL	BRH	NC	0	NC

Sporting positions
Preceded by Inaugural	Winner of the Sandown 500; 1964; With: Ralph Sachs	Succeeded by Frank Gardner; Kevin Bartlett
