= 1964 Sandown 6 Hour International =

The 1964 Sandown 6 Hour International was an endurance race for saloon cars complying with FIA Group 1 regulations. The event was held at the Sandown Park circuit in Victoria, Australia on 29 November 1964 and was the genesis of what is now known as the Sandown 500. It was organised by Sandown Park Motor Sport Pty. Ltd.

The race was won by Roberto Bussinello and Ralph Sachs, driving an Alfa Romeo Giulia TI Super.

== Classes ==
Entries competed in seven classes as follows:

- Class A : Over 3000cc
- Class B : 2501-3000cc
- Class C : 2001-2500cc
- Class D : 1601-2000cc
- Class E : 1301-1600cc
- Class F : 900-1300cc
- Class G : Open (ineligible for outright awards)

Class G was for entries which were modified to FIA Group 2 specifications.

== Results ==
Position	Drivers	No.	Car	Entrant	Class	Laps
1	Roberto Bussinello, Ralph Sachs	50	Alfa Romeo Giulia TI Super	Alec Mildren Racing Limited	E	230
2	Peter Manton, Brian Foley	62	Morris Cooper S	B.M.C. (U.K.)	F	223
3	Geoff Russell, John Raeburn	51	Ford Cortina GT	Ford Motor Co Aust.	F	223
4	Allan Moffat, Jon Leighton	2	Ford Cortina Lotus	Allan Moffat	G	220
5	Ian Cooke, Bruce Hindhaugh	66	Morris Cooper S	Scuderia Birchwood	F	211
6	Paddy Hopkirk, John Fitzpatrick	60	Morris Cooper S	B.M.C. (U.K.)	F	204
7	Bill Burns, Brian Lawler	32	Fiat 2300	Burns Hire Cars	C	202
8	Colin Giltrap, Ivan Segedin	41	Volvo 122S	B & C Cars Pty. Ltd.	D	201
9	Brian Muir, Bill Brown	64	Datsun Bluebird SS	Nissan Motor Dist.	F	201
10	Spencer Martin, Ron Clarke	65	Datsun Bluebird SS	Nissan Motor Dist.	F	201
11	Bruce McPhee, Fred Morgan	22	Holden EH Special S4	Muirs Motors Pty. Ltd.	B	201
12	Bob Jane, George Reynolds	51	Ford Cortina Lotus	Ford Motor Co. Aust.	E	200
13	Ann Bennett, John Colwell	40	Toyota Crown	Tanus Motors	D	200
14	Pedro Owen, Kevin Bartlett	30	Mercedes-Benz 220SE	Peter Owen Pty. Ltd.	C	198
15	Ian McDonald, Sid Fisher	44	Peugeot 404	P. J. Regan Motors	D	197
16	Laurie Stewart, Brian Rossiter	63	Morris Cooper S	Flat Rentals Pty. Ltd.	F	197
17	Alan Mottram, Fred Sutherland	11	Studebaker Lark	Canada Cycle & Motor Company	A	196
18	Jack Eiffeltow, Clem Smith	12	Chrysler Valiant	Eiffel Tower Dandenong, Clem Smith Adelaide	A	195
19	Tony Osborne, Kevin Burns	20	Ford Zephyr Mk III	A. J. R. Osbourne	B	192
20	Paul England, Doug Stewart	54	Volkswagen 1500S	V.W. Distribution Pty. Ltd.	D	190
21	Dick Thurston, Brian Sampson	45	Triumph 2000	Pitstop / Motor Improvements	D	189
22	Barry Topen, D. Cooke	31	Fiat 2300	M. J. Pryor	C	187
23	Rodger Ward, Warren Weldon	10	Studebaker Lark	Needham Motors	A	187
24	Bob Holden, Barry Ferguson	55	Volkswagen 1500S	V.W. Distribution Pty. Ltd.	F	182
25	D. Leighton, Kaye Whiteford	67	Morris 1100	Dianne Leighton	F	179
26	H Gibson, Hoot Gibson Jr.	68	Triumph Herald	Hoot Gibson Snr.	F	176
27	Anthony Cooper, Joe Hills	53	Ford Cortina GT	Beautihome (Aust.) Const. Pty. Ltd.	D	171
28	Frank Matich, Rod Blair	14	Jaguar 3.8 Litre	Rod Blair Insurance	A	157
DNF	Doug Whiteford, Geoff Hopkins	43	Peugeot 404	C. & G. Distributors	D	196
DNF	Timo Mäkinen, Rauno Aaltonen	61	Morris Cooper S	B.M.C. (U.K.)	F	129
DNF	Jackie Stewart, Jim Palmer	56	Ford Cortina Lotus	Jim Palmer Racing	D	118
DNF	Lex Davison, Gawaine Baillie	1	Ford Galaxie	Sir Gawaine Baillie	G	90
DNF	Frank Coad, John Roxburgh	21	Vauxhall Velox	Straightway Motors	B	89
DNF	Rex Emmett, John Connolly	69	Renault R8	Rex Emmett	D	15
DNF	Alan Hamilton, Jim Abbott	42	Peugeot 404	C. & G. Dictributors	D	6

There were 37 starters in the race and 28 cars were classified as finishers.

Preceded by None	Sandown 6 Hour International; 1964	Succeeded by 1965 International 6 Hour Touring Car Race
