= 1965 Formula One season =

19th season of FIA Formula One racing

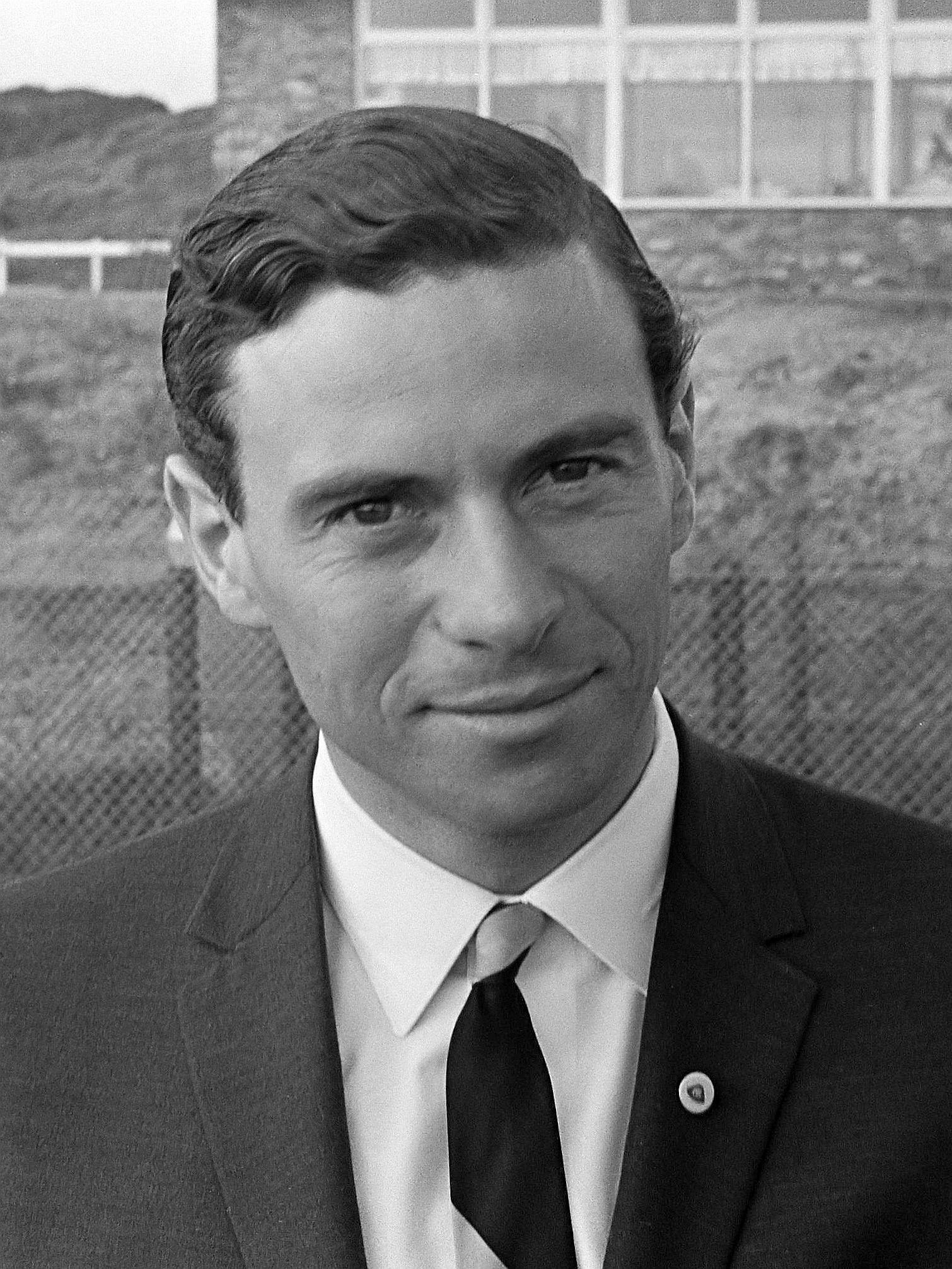
Jim Clark won his second and final championship, driving a Lotus-Climax.

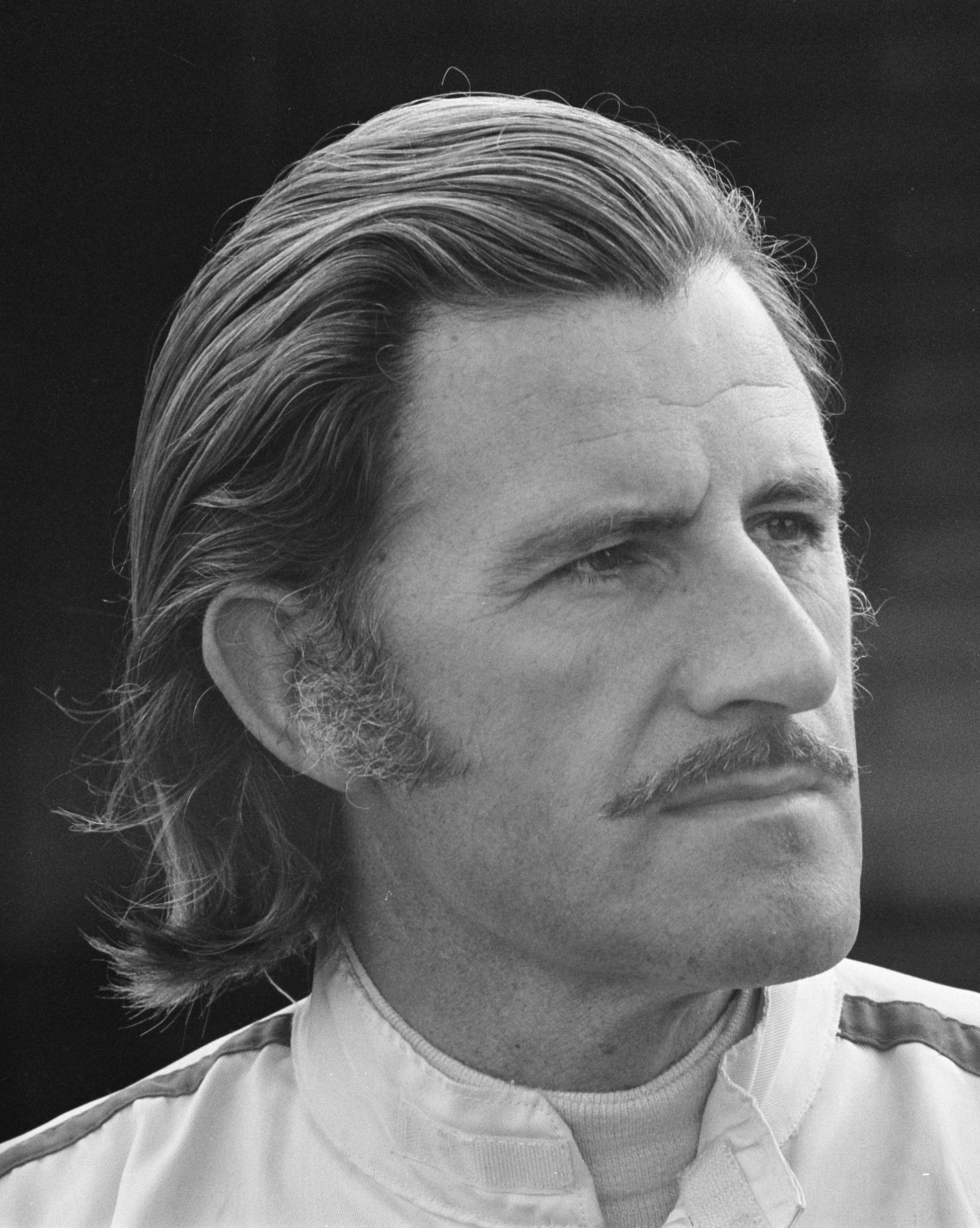
Then 1962 champion Graham Hill finished as runner-up in the World Drivers' Championship for the third season in a row.

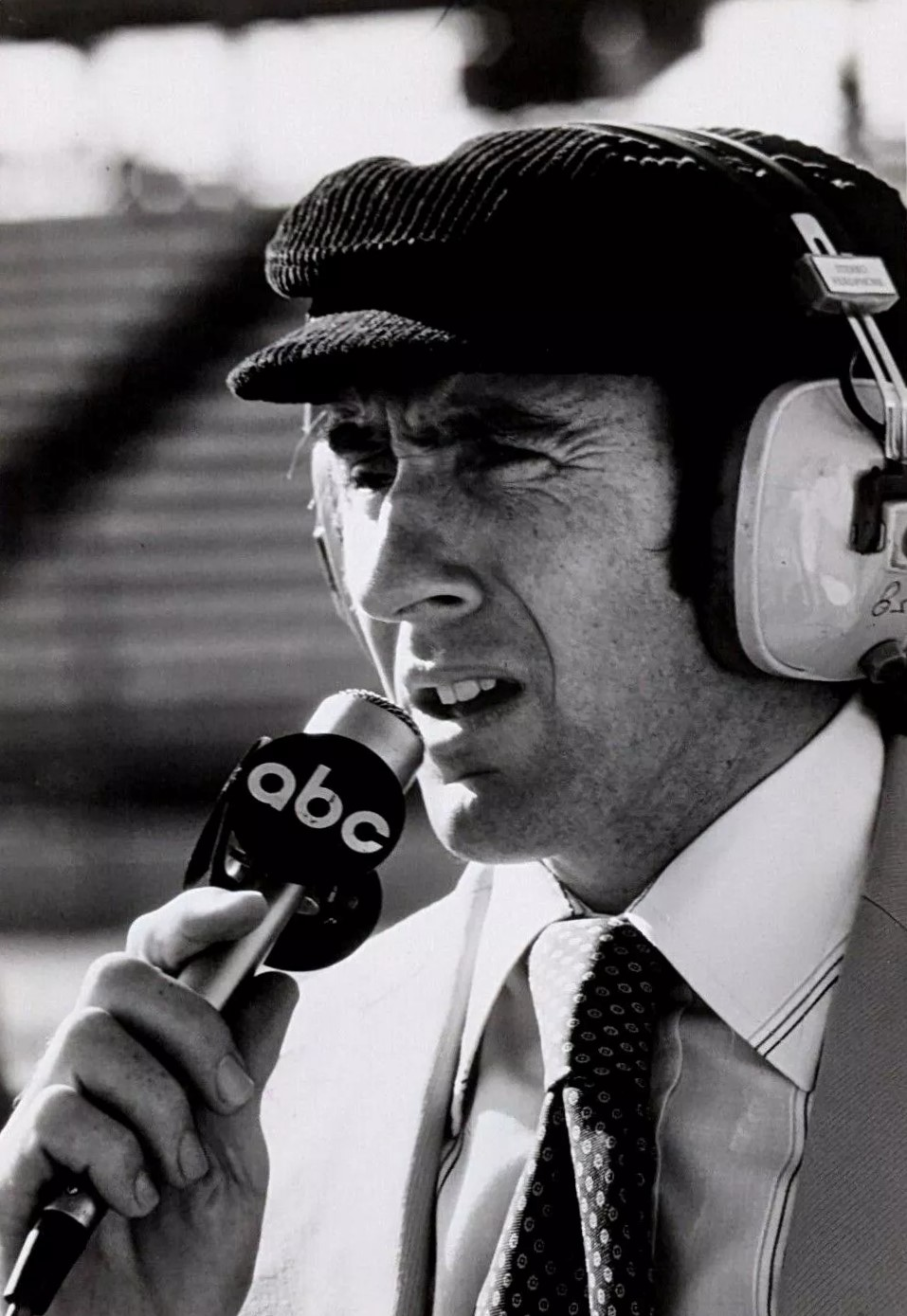
Jackie Stewart finished third in his first Formula One season.

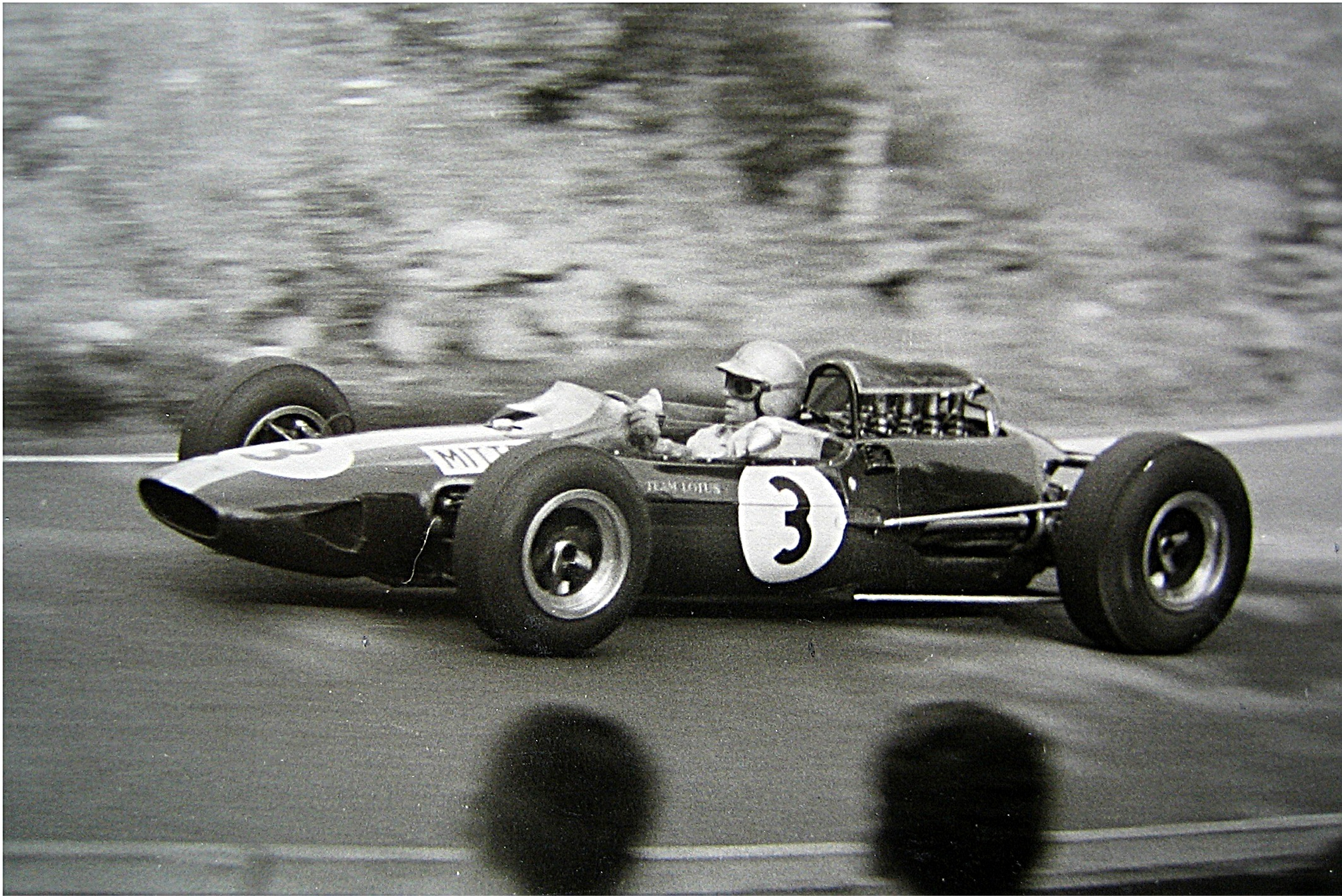
Lotus won the International Cup for F1 Manufacturers with the Lotus 25 & 33.

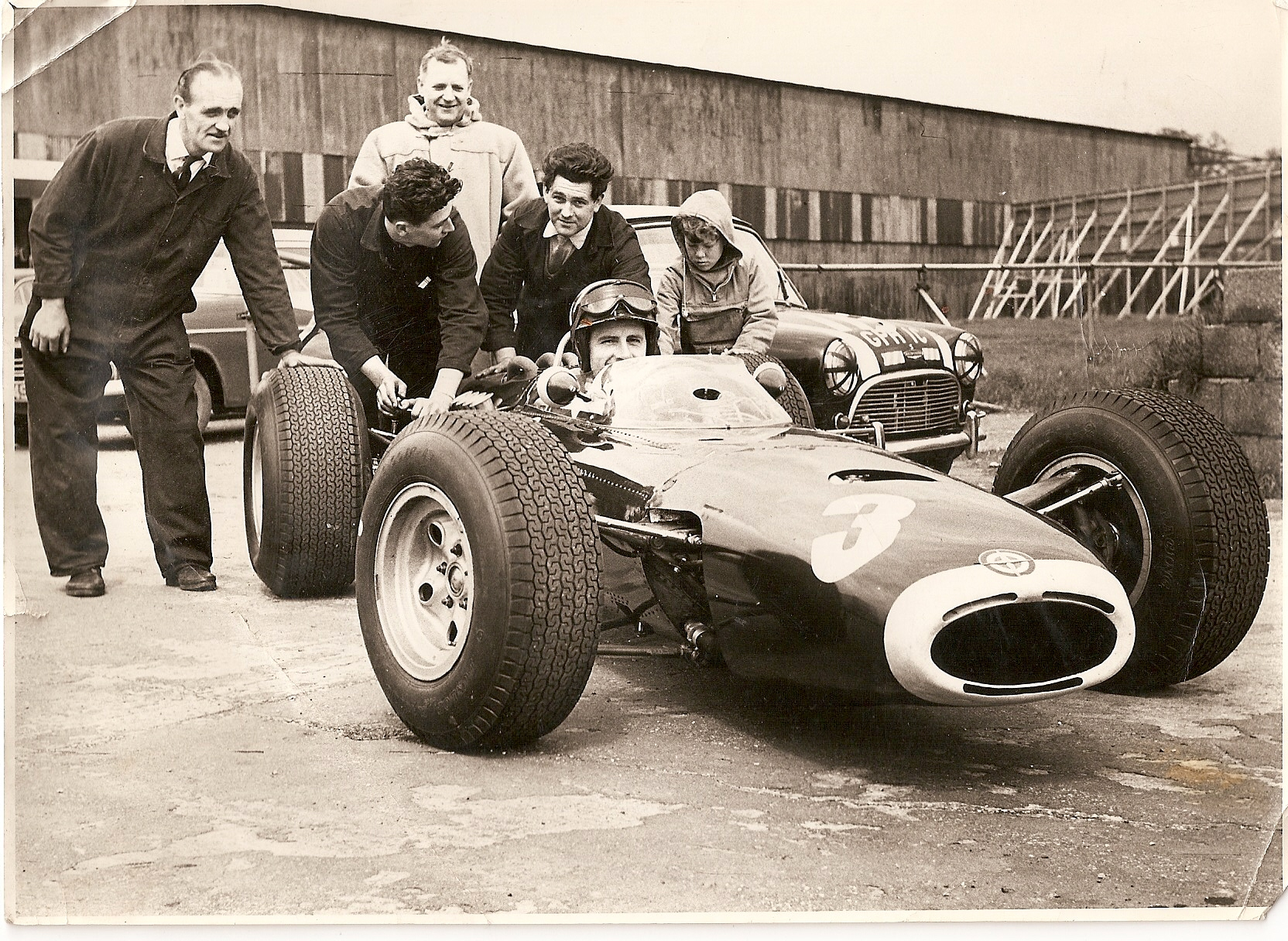
BRM finished second in the International Cup for F1 Manufacturers with the BRM P261.

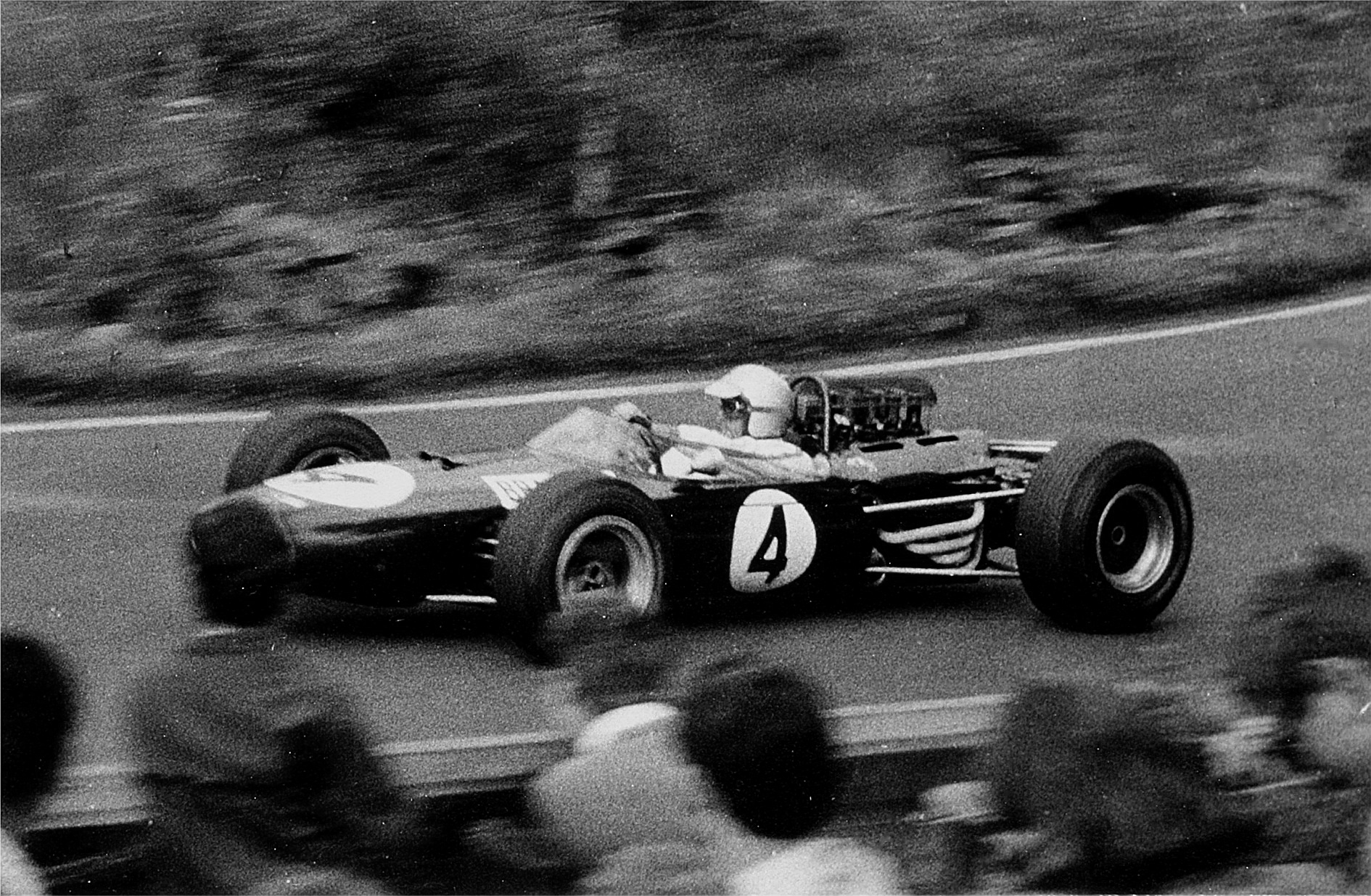
Brabham finished third in the International Cup for F1 Manufacturers with the Brabham BT7 & BT11.

The 1965 Formula One season was the 19th season of FIA Formula One racing. It featured the 16th World Championship of Drivers, the 8th International Cup for F1 Manufacturers, and seven non-championship races open to Formula One cars. The World Championship was contested over ten races between 1 January and 24 October 1965.

Jim Clark won the Drivers' Championship in a Lotus-Climax. It was his second and last championship. Lotus were also awarded the International Cup for F1 Manufacturers for the second time. The season saw the debut for future World Champion Jackie Stewart, who finished third in the World Drivers' Championship.

== Teams and drivers ==
The following teams and drivers competed in the 1965 FIA World Championship.

Entrant	Constructor	Chassis	Engine	Tyre	Driver	Rounds
(Italy) Scuderia Ferrari SpA SEFAC (United States) North American Racing Team	Ferrari	158; 1512	Ferrari 205B 1.5 V8; Ferrari 207 1.5 F12	D	(United Kingdom) John Surtees	1–8
(Italy) Scuderia Ferrari SpA SEFAC (United States) North American Racing Team	Ferrari	158; 1512	Ferrari 205B 1.5 V8; Ferrari 207 1.5 F12	D	(Italy) Lorenzo Bandini	All
(Italy) Scuderia Ferrari SpA SEFAC (United States) North American Racing Team	Ferrari	158; 1512	Ferrari 205B 1.5 V8; Ferrari 207 1.5 F12	D	(Italy) Nino Vaccarella	8
(Italy) Scuderia Ferrari SpA SEFAC (United States) North American Racing Team	Ferrari	158; 1512	Ferrari 205B 1.5 V8; Ferrari 207 1.5 F12	D	(Mexico) Pedro Rodríguez	9–10
(Italy) Scuderia Ferrari SpA SEFAC (United States) North American Racing Team	Ferrari	158; 1512	Ferrari 205B 1.5 V8; Ferrari 207 1.5 F12	D	(United States) Bob Bondurant	9
(Italy) Scuderia Ferrari SpA SEFAC (United States) North American Racing Team	Ferrari	158; 1512	Ferrari 205B 1.5 V8; Ferrari 207 1.5 F12	D	(Italy) Ludovico Scarfiotti	10
(United Kingdom) Owen Racing Organisation	BRM	P261	BRM P56 1.5 V8	D	(United Kingdom) Graham Hill	All
(United Kingdom) Owen Racing Organisation	BRM	P261	BRM P56 1.5 V8	D	(United Kingdom) Jackie Stewart	All
(United Kingdom) Team Lotus	Lotus-Climax	33; 25	Climax FWMV 1.5 V8	D	(United Kingdom) Jim Clark	1, 3–10
(United Kingdom) Team Lotus	Lotus-Climax	33; 25	Climax FWMV 1.5 V8	D	(United Kingdom) Mike Spence	1, 3–10
(United Kingdom) Team Lotus	Lotus-Climax	33; 25	Climax FWMV 1.5 V8	D	(West Germany) Gerhard Mitter	7
(United Kingdom) Team Lotus	Lotus-Climax	33; 25	Climax FWMV 1.5 V8	D	(Italy) Geki	8
(United Kingdom) Team Lotus	Lotus-Climax	33; 25	Climax FWMV 1.5 V8	D	(Mexico) Moisés Solana	9–10
(United Kingdom) Brabham Racing Organisation	Brabham-Climax	BT7; BT11	Climax FWMV 1.5 V8	G	(Australia) Jack Brabham	1–3, 5, 7, 9–10
(United Kingdom) Brabham Racing Organisation	Brabham-Climax	BT7; BT11	Climax FWMV 1.5 V8	G	(United States) Dan Gurney	1, 3–10
(United Kingdom) Brabham Racing Organisation	Brabham-Climax	BT7; BT11	Climax FWMV 1.5 V8	G	(New Zealand) Denny Hulme	2, 4–8
(United Kingdom) Brabham Racing Organisation	Brabham-Climax	BT7; BT11	Climax FWMV 1.5 V8	G	(Italy) Giancarlo Baghetti	8
(United Kingdom) Cooper Car Company	Cooper-Climax	T77; T73	Climax FWMV 1.5 V8	D	(New Zealand) Bruce McLaren	All
(United Kingdom) Cooper Car Company	Cooper-Climax	T77; T73	Climax FWMV 1.5 V8	D	(Austria) Jochen Rindt	All
(United Kingdom) R.R.C. Walker Racing Team	Brabham-Climax	BT7	Climax FWMV 1.5 V8	D	(Sweden) Jo Bonnier	All
(United Kingdom) R.R.C. Walker Racing Team	Brabham-BRM	BT11	BRM P56 1.5 V8	D	(Switzerland) Jo Siffert	All
(United Kingdom) DW Racing Enterprises	Brabham-Climax	BT11	Climax FWMV 1.5 V8	D	(United Kingdom) Bob Anderson	1–7
(United Kingdom) DW Racing Enterprises	Lotus-Climax	33	Climax FWMV 1.5 V8	D	(Australia) Paul Hawkins	2, 7
(United Kingdom) Reg Parnell Racing	Lotus-BRM	25; 33	BRM P56 1.5 V8	D	(South Africa) Tony Maggs	1
(United Kingdom) Reg Parnell Racing	Lotus-BRM	25; 33	BRM P56 1.5 V8	D	(United Kingdom) Richard Attwood	2–3, 5–10
(United Kingdom) Reg Parnell Racing	Lotus-BRM	25; 33	BRM P56 1.5 V8	D	(United Kingdom) Mike Hailwood	2
(United Kingdom) Reg Parnell Racing	Lotus-BRM	25; 33	BRM P56 1.5 V8	D	(United Kingdom) Innes Ireland	3–6, 8–10
(United Kingdom) Reg Parnell Racing	Lotus-BRM	25; 33	BRM P56 1.5 V8	D	(New Zealand) Chris Amon	4, 7
(United Kingdom) Reg Parnell Racing	Lotus-BRM	25; 33	BRM P56 1.5 V8	D	(United States) Bob Bondurant	10
(United Kingdom) John Willment Automobiles	Brabham-BRM	BT11	BRM P56 1.5 V8	D	(Australia) Frank Gardner	1–3, 5–8
(United Kingdom) John Willment Automobiles	Brabham-Ford	BT10	Ford 109E 1.5 L4	D	(Australia) Paul Hawkins	1
(Rhodesia) John Love	Cooper-Climax	T55	Climax FPF 1.5 L4	D	(Rhodesia) John Love	1
(United Kingdom) David Prophet	Brabham-Ford	BT10	Ford 109E 1.5 L4	D	(United Kingdom) David Prophet	1
(South Africa) Otelle Nucci	Alfa Special-Alfa Romeo	Special	Alfa Romeo Giulietta 1.5 L4	D	(South Africa) Peter de Klerk	1
(South Africa) Otelle Nucci	LDS-Climax	Mk2	Climax FPF 1.5 L4	D	(South Africa) Doug Serrurier	1
(South Africa) Lawson Organisation	Lotus-Climax	21	Climax FPF 1.5 L4	D	(South Africa) Ernie Pieterse	1
(South Africa) Scuderia Scribante	Lotus-Climax	21	Climax FPF 1.5 L4	D	(South Africa) Neville Lederle	1
(Rhodesia) Clive Puzey Motors	Lotus-Climax	18/21	Climax FPF 1.5 L4	D	(Rhodesia) Clive Puzey	1
(Rhodesia) Sam Tingle	LDS-Alfa Romeo	Mk2	Alfa Romeo Giulietta 1.5 L4	D	(Rhodesia) Sam Tingle	1
(South Africa) Ted Lanfear	Lotus-Ford	22	Ford 109E 1.5 L4	D	(South Africa) Brausch Niemann	1
(South Africa) Trevor Blokdyk	Cooper-Ford	T59	Ford 109E 1.5 L4	D	(South Africa) Trevor Blokdyk	1
(South Africa) Jackie Pretorius	LDS-Alfa Romeo	Mk1	Alfa Romeo Giulietta 1.5 L4	D	(South Africa) Jackie Pretorius	1
(South Africa) Ecurie Tomahawk	Lotus-Ford	20	Ford 109E 1.5 L4	D	(South Africa) Dave Charlton	1
(South Africa) Brian Raubenheimer	Lotus-Ford	20	Ford 109E 1.5 L4	D	(South Africa) Brian Raubenheimer	1
(Japan) Honda R & D Company	Honda	RA272	Honda RA272E 1.5 V12	G	(United States) Ronnie Bucknum	2–4, 8–10
(Japan) Honda R & D Company	Honda	RA272	Honda RA272E 1.5 V12	G	(United States) Richie Ginther	2–6, 8–10
(Italy) Scuderia Centro Sud	BRM	P57	BRM P56 1.5 V8	D	(Belgium) Lucien Bianchi	3
(Italy) Scuderia Centro Sud	BRM	P57	BRM P56 1.5 V8	D	(Belgium) Willy Mairesse	3
(Italy) Scuderia Centro Sud	BRM	P57	BRM P56 1.5 V8	D	(United States) Masten Gregory	3, 5, 7–8
(Italy) Scuderia Centro Sud	BRM	P57	BRM P56 1.5 V8	D	(Italy) Roberto Bussinello	7–8
(Italy) Scuderia Centro Sud	BRM	P57	BRM P56 1.5 V8	D	(Italy) Giorgio Bassi	8
(United Kingdom) Bob Gerard Racing	Cooper-Climax	T60	Climax FWMV 1.5 V8	D	(United Kingdom) John Rhodes	5
(United Kingdom) Bob Gerard Racing	Cooper-Ford	T71/73	Ford 109E 1.5 L4	D	(United Kingdom) Alan Rollinson	5
(United Kingdom) Ian Raby Racing	Brabham-BRM	BT3	BRM P56 1.5 V8	D	(United Kingdom) Ian Raby	5, 7
(United Kingdom) Ian Raby Racing	Brabham-BRM	BT3	BRM P56 1.5 V8	D	(New Zealand) Chris Amon	5
(United Kingdom) Brian Gubby	Lotus-Climax	24	Climax FWMV 1.5 V8	D	(United Kingdom) Brian Gubby	5

=== Driver changes ===
Three future champions made their debuts in 1965:

- Jackie Stewart replaced Richie Ginther at BRM, after the American driver was invited to join the Honda F1 team.
- Denny Hulme was signed by Brabham, racing with team owner Jack Brabham and veteran Dan Gurney.
- Having entered one race in 1964, Jochen Rindt was offered a full-time seat at Cooper, after 1961 champion Phil Hill had retired from single-seater racing.

== Calendar ==
Round	Grand Prix	Circuit	Date
1	South African Grand Prix	(South Africa) Prince George Circuit, East London	1 January
2	Monaco Grand Prix	Circuit de Monaco, Monte Carlo	30 May
3	Belgian Grand Prix	(Belgium) Circuit de Spa-Francorchamps, Stavelot	13 June
4	French Grand Prix	(France) Charade Circuit, Clermont-Ferrand	27 June
5	British Grand Prix	(United Kingdom) Silverstone Circuit, Silverstone	10 July
6	Dutch Grand Prix	(Netherlands) Circuit Zandvoort, Zandvoort	18 July
7	German Grand Prix	(West Germany) Nürburgring, Nürburg	1 August
8	Italian Grand Prix	(Italy) Autodromo Nazionale di Monza, Monza	12 September
9	United States Grand Prix	(United States) Watkins Glen International, New York	3 October
10	Mexican Grand Prix	Magdalena Mixhuca, Mexico City	24 October

=== Calendar changes ===
- The South African Grand Prix was moved back a week, which meant it would not be the last round of 1964 but the first round of 1965.
- The French Grand Prix was moved from Rouen-Les-Essarts to Charade Circuit for a year.
- The British Grand Prix was moved from Brands Hatch to Silverstone, in keeping with the event-sharing arrangement between the two circuits.
- The Dutch Grand Prix was moved from the middle of May to the middle of July.
- The Austrian Grand Prix was run as a sports car race.

== Championship report ==
=== Rounds 1 to 3 ===
For the first time, the championship started in South Africa, and it did on the very first day of the year. Sixteen drivers were invited to the event and guaranteed a place on the grid. There were four places remaining, but fourteen drivers applied. Through pre-qualifying and subsequent qualifying, the grid was filled. The drivers started in order of their fastest qualifying times: 1963 champion Jim Clark in his Lotus-Climax was on pole position, ahead of 1964 champion John Surtees (Ferrari) and 1959 and 1960 champion Jack Brabham (Brabham). After the start, Clark led away with his teammate Mike Spence up to second. Not many changes in positions happened after that, until Brabham's engine started misfiring, leaking oil, and sending Spence in a spin on the next lap. The podium was taken by Clark, Surtees and 1962 champion Graham Hill (BRM). Spence and Brabham finished fourth and eighth, respectively.

Just short of a full five months later, the Monaco Grand Prix was held and for this race, the organisers guaranteed one place on the grid for each factory team. The rest of the applicants had to be fast enough during qualifying to gain a starting ticket. In disagreement, Lotus decided to withdraw from the event, instead entering the Indianapolis 500 a day later. Hill started on pole position, ahead of Brabham and Hill's teammate Jackie Stewart. Brabham fell back and the two BRMs led away. Hill lost a lot of time when he had to avoid a backmarker, going up the escape road and having to push his car back onto the track. On lap 30, Stewart spun coming out of the fastest corner, before Brabham's Climax engine seized. Hill made it back into the lead, ahead of the Ferraris of Bandini and Surtees. Richard Attwood crashed in the hairpin, the leaders narrowly avoiding him, before Paul Hawkins crashed into the harbour. His car sank to the bottom but Hawkins was unhurt, as was Attwood. Hill took the win, ahead of Bandini and Stewart, after Surtees ran out of fuel with a lap to go.

For the Belgian Grand Prix, Hill started on pole again, ahead of Clark and Stewart. Rain fell and everyone held a safe distance from the car in front, except Clark, who took the lead through the most dangerous corner on the track, the Masta Kink. He quickly pulled out a big lead and even lapped Hill. Stewart finished second, ahead of Bruce McLaren, Brabham and Hill. Attwood crashed at Masta, his Lotus breaking in half and catching fire, but the driver escaping with only minor burns.

Jim Clark (Lotus) was leading the Drivers' Championship with 18 points, ahead of Graham Hill (BRM, 15) and debutant Jackie Stewart (BRM, 11). In the Manufacturers' Championship, BRM was leading with 19 points, ahead of Lotus (18) and Ferrari (12).

=== Rounds 4 to 7 ===
The French Grand Prix was run for the first time at the Circuit de Charade, which was described as a quicker, twistier version of the Nürburgring. Championship leader Jim Clark qualified his Lotus on pole position, ahead of two "number two drivers": Jackie Stewart (BRM) and Lorenzo Bandini (Ferrari). Their respective team leaders, Graham Hill and John Surtees, started thirteenth and fourth. Except from Bandini's accident on lap 36, the race finished as it started: Clark claimed another Grand Slam victory, ahead of Stewart and Surtees. Hill recovered to fifth.

The British Grand Prix was run at Silverstone, where Clark scored another pole position, ahead of Hill and Honda driver Richie Ginther. At the start, Ginther challenged Clark for the lead, but fell back to fourth and then retired on lap 26. Surtees was fighting for third place against Lotus driver Mike Spence, while his team leader suddenly slowed down. The Climax engine was losing oil and Clark was coasting round the corners, only using power on the straights. Hill did anything within his might to chase his rival down, but the Lotus hang on to finish with 3 seconds to spare. Surtees came in third.

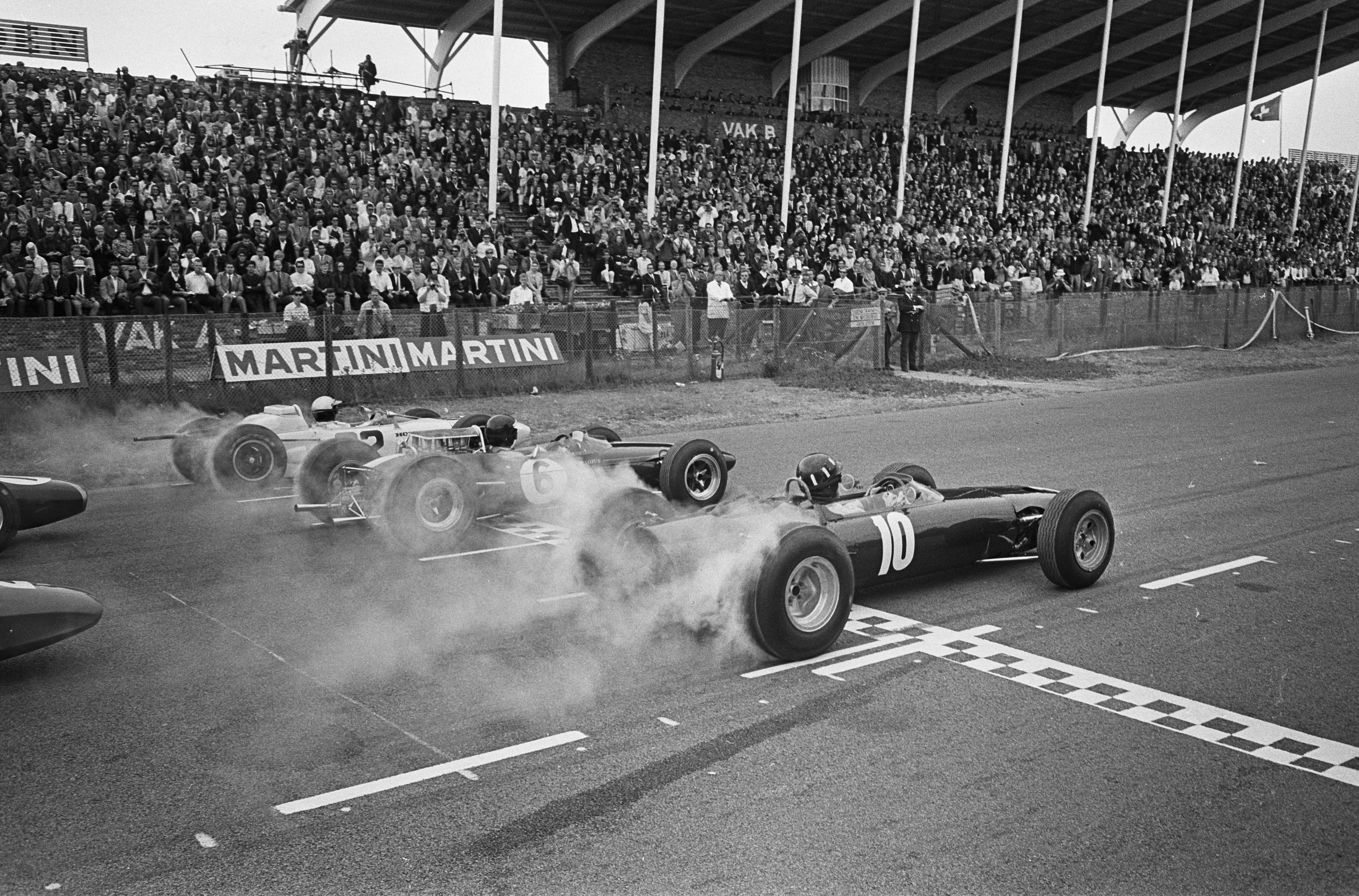
The start of the Dutch Grand Prix

The Dutch Grand Prix was run just a week later and all eyes were on Clark. It was his rival Hill, however, that scored pole position. Clark started in second, Ginther again in third. Moments before the flag fell, Lotus team owner Colin Chapman was involved in a brawl with the Dutch police. It would result in his arrest and a two-day imprisonment. The race went on unhindered, however, and saw Ginther take the lead. On lap 5, Hill and Clark were back at the front, with the Lotus soon getting ahead. Hill then lost second place to his teammate Stewart and third place to Brabham driver Dan Gurney. Clark scored his fifth win of the season, ahead of Stewart, his fourth podium, and Gurney, his first podium of the year.

It was Clark on top again during qualifying for the German Grand Prix, with more than 3 seconds over the BRMs of Stewart and Hill. At the start, Surtees's gearbox went wrong and he fell back. It would lead to his retirement on lap 11. Clark and Hill were fighting for the lead, while Stewart's suspension failed and he handed third place to Gurney. Clark broke the lap record a couple of times and won his fifth consecutive race. It was the first time since Jack Brabham in 1960 that a driver achieved this feat. Hill was second, Gurney third.

With only the top six finishes counting towards the championship, Jim Clark's six wins crowned him the Driver's Champion with 54 points, ahead of Graham Hill (BRM, 30) and Jackie Stewart (BRM, 25). Clark's six wins also gave Lotus the Manufacturers' Championship, ahead of BRM (39) and Scuderia Ferrari (21).

=== Rounds 8 to 10 ===
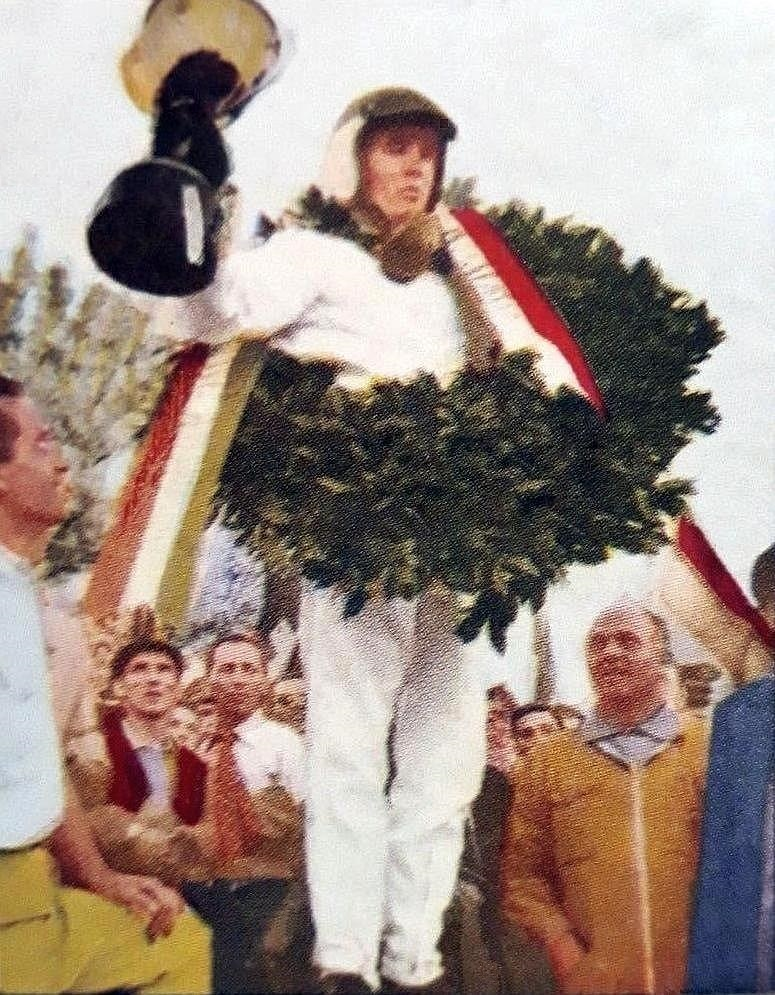
Jackie Stewart won the Italian Grand Prix in his debut season.

Newly-crowned champion Jim Clark (Lotus) achieved his fifth pole position of the year at the Italian Grand Prix, ahead of John Surtees for Ferrari and Jackie Stewart for BRM. At the start, Surtees had problems with his clutch, so Clark and Stewart were followed by Graham Hill, who had to finish first to stay in the race for the championship. The top three were engaged in a slipstream battle and the lead changed hands lap after lap. With ten laps to go, Clark suddenly stopped with a failing fuel pump, so Hill and Stewart were free to fight over the win in equal machinery. Going into the last lap, Hill touched the grass with his outer wheels, almost spinning but certainly valuable seconds. Stewart won his first race, with Hill in second and Dan Gurney in third.

Hill started on pole for the United States Grand Prix, ahead of Clark and Honda driver Richie Ginther. Clark quickly grabbed the lead but soon retired with a broken piston. As it had happened more often, Ginther fell back, while his American rival Gurney went up the order. He came within four seconds of Hill when the Brit slid off the track, but when he made a mistake himself, his team leader Jack Brabham took second place. The Australian challenged Hill for the lead, but was unable to get by, and then became the third top-runner to take to the grass. The order at the finish was Hill, Gurney, Brabham.

The season ended with the Mexican Grand Prix, where Clark scored another pole position, ahead of Americans Gurney and Ginther. The Honda driver took the lead at the start, while Stewart got up to second, before being passed by Mike Spence. His teammate Clark suffered his third consecutive retirement, before Stewart went out at the half-way point, and Hill's engine gave out with ten laps to go. Gurney passed Spence for second place and came within 3 seconds of the leader, but Ginther held on to his and Honda's first win.

Jim Clark (Lotus) was awarded the 1965 Drivers' Championship after scoring 54 points, ahead of Graham Hill (BRM, 40) and Jackie Stewart (BRM, 33). Lotus clinched the Manufacturers' Championship as well, with 54 points, ahead of BRM (45), with Brabham just overtaking Ferrari for third place (27 and 26 points, respectively).

== Results and standings ==
=== Grands Prix ===
Round	Grand Prix	Pole position	Fastest lap	Winning driver	Winning constructor	Tyre	Report
1	(South Africa) South African Grand Prix	(United Kingdom) Jim Clark	(United Kingdom) Jim Clark	(United Kingdom) Jim Clark	(United Kingdom) Lotus-Climax	D	Report
2	Monaco Grand Prix	(United Kingdom) Graham Hill	(United Kingdom) Graham Hill	(United Kingdom) Graham Hill	(United Kingdom) BRM	D	Report
3	(Belgium) Belgian Grand Prix	(United Kingdom) Graham Hill	(United Kingdom) Jim Clark	(United Kingdom) Jim Clark	(United Kingdom) Lotus-Climax	D	Report
4	(France) French Grand Prix	(United Kingdom) Jim Clark	(United Kingdom) Jim Clark	(United Kingdom) Jim Clark	(United Kingdom) Lotus-Climax	D	Report
5	(United Kingdom) British Grand Prix	(United Kingdom) Jim Clark	(United Kingdom) Graham Hill	(United Kingdom) Jim Clark	(United Kingdom) Lotus-Climax	D	Report
6	(Netherlands) Dutch Grand Prix	(United Kingdom) Graham Hill	(United Kingdom) Jim Clark	(United Kingdom) Jim Clark	(United Kingdom) Lotus-Climax	D	Report
7	(West Germany) German Grand Prix	(United Kingdom) Jim Clark	(United Kingdom) Jim Clark	(United Kingdom) Jim Clark	(United Kingdom) Lotus-Climax	D	Report
8	(Italy) Italian Grand Prix	(United Kingdom) Jim Clark	(United Kingdom) Jim Clark	(United Kingdom) Jackie Stewart	(United Kingdom) BRM	D	Report
9	United States Grand Prix	(United Kingdom) Graham Hill	(United Kingdom) Graham Hill	(United Kingdom) Graham Hill	(United Kingdom) BRM	D	Report
10	(Mexico) Mexican Grand Prix	(United Kingdom) Jim Clark	(United States) Dan Gurney	(United States) Richie Ginther	(Japan) Honda	G	Report

=== Scoring system ===
Points were awarded to the top six classified finishers. Only the best six results counted towards the championship.

The International Cup for F1 Manufacturers only counted the points of the highest-finishing driver for each race. Additionally, like the Drivers' Championship, only the best six results counted towards the cup.

Numbers without parentheses are championship points; numbers in parentheses are total points scored. Points were awarded in the following system:

Position	1st	2nd	3rd	4th	5th	6th
Race	9	6	4	3	2	1

=== World Drivers' Championship standings ===
Pos.	Driver	RSA (South Africa)	MON (Monaco)	BEL (Belgium)	FRA (France)	GBR (United Kingdom)	NED (Netherlands)	GER (West Germany)	ITA (Italy)	USA (United States)	MEX (Mexico)	Pts. (Note: Only the best 6 results counted towards the championship. Numbers without parentheses are championship points; numbers in parentheses are total points scored.)
1	(United Kingdom) Jim Clark	1^{P}^{F}		1^{F}	1^{P}^{F}	1^{P}	1^{F}	1^{P}^{F}	10^{P}^{F}	Ret	Ret^{P}	54
2	(United Kingdom) Graham Hill	3	1^{P}^{F}	(5)^{P}	(5)	2^{F}	(4)^{P}	2	2	1^{P}^{F}	Ret	40 (47)
3	(United Kingdom) Jackie Stewart	(6)	3	2	2	5	2	Ret	1	Ret	Ret	33 (34)
4	(United States) Dan Gurney	Ret		10	Ret	6	3	3	3	2	2^{F}	25
5	(United Kingdom) John Surtees	2	4	Ret	3	3	7	Ret	Ret			17
6	(Italy) Lorenzo Bandini	15	2	9	8	Ret	9	6	4	4	8	13
7	(United States) Richie Ginther		Ret	6	Ret	Ret	6		14	7	1	11
8	(United Kingdom) Mike Spence	4		7	7	4	8	Ret	11	Ret	3	10
=	(New Zealand) Bruce McLaren	5	5	3	Ret	10	Ret	Ret	5	Ret	Ret	10
10	(Australia) Jack Brabham	8	Ret	4		DNS		5		3	Ret	9
11	(New Zealand) Denny Hulme		8		4	Ret	5	Ret	Ret			5
=	(Switzerland) Jo Siffert	7	6	8	6	9	13	Ret	Ret	11	4	5
13	(Austria) Jochen Rindt	Ret	DNQ	11	Ret	14	Ret	4	8	6	Ret	4
14	(Mexico) Pedro Rodríguez									5	7	2
=	(United States) Ronnie Bucknum		Ret	Ret	Ret				Ret	13	5	2
=	(United Kingdom) Richard Attwood		Ret	14		13	12	Ret	6	10	6	2
—	(Sweden) Jo Bonnier	Ret	7	Ret	Ret	7	Ret	7	7	8	Ret	0
—	(Australia) Frank Gardner	12	Ret	Ret		8	11	Ret	Ret			0
—	(United States) Masten Gregory			Ret		12		8	Ret			0
—	(United Kingdom) Bob Anderson	NC	9	DNS	9	Ret	Ret	DNS				0
—	(United Kingdom) Innes Ireland			13	Ret	Ret	10		9	Ret	DNS	0
—	(Australia) Paul Hawkins	9	10					Ret				0
—	(United States) Bob Bondurant									9	Ret	0
—	(South Africa) Peter de Klerk	10										0
—	(South Africa) Tony Maggs	11										0
—	(United Kingdom) Ian Raby					11		DNQ				0
—	(Mexico) Moisés Solana									12	Ret	0
—	(Belgium) Lucien Bianchi			12								0
—	(Italy) Nino Vaccarella								12			0
—	(Rhodesia) Sam Tingle	13										0
—	(Italy) Roberto Bussinello							DNQ	13			0
—	(United Kingdom) David Prophet	14										0
—	(New Zealand) Chris Amon				Ret	DNS		Ret				0
—	(Rhodesia) John Love	Ret										0
—	(United Kingdom) Mike Hailwood		Ret									0
—	(United Kingdom) John Rhodes					Ret						0
—	(West Germany) Gerhard Mitter							Ret				0
—	(Italy) Giancarlo Baghetti								Ret			0
—	(Italy) Geki								Ret			0
—	(Italy) Giorgio Bassi								Ret			0
—	(Belgium) Willy Mairesse			DNS								0
—	(United Kingdom) Alan Rollinson					DNS						0
—	(Italy) Ludovico Scarfiotti										DNS	0
—	(South Africa) Trevor Blokdyk	DNQ										0
—	(South Africa) Doug Serrurier	DNQ										0
—	(South Africa) Neville Lederle	DNQ										0
—	(South Africa) Brausch Niemann	DNQ										0
—	(South Africa) Ernie Pieterse	DNQ										0
—	(United Kingdom) Brian Gubby					DNQ						0
—	(South Africa) Jackie Pretorius	DNPQ										0
—	(Rhodesia) Clive Puzey	DNPQ										0
—	(South Africa) Dave Charlton	DNPQ										0
—	(South Africa) Brian Raubenheimer	WD										0
Pos.	Driver	RSA (South Africa)	MON (Monaco)	BEL (Belgium)	FRA (France)	GBR (United Kingdom)	NED (Netherlands)	GER (West Germany)	ITA (Italy)	USA (United States)	MEX (Mexico)	Pts.

Key
Colour	Result
Gold	Winner
Silver	Second place
Bronze	Third place
Green	Other points position
Blue	Other classified position
Blue	Not classified, finished (NC)
Purple	Not classified, retired (Ret)
Red	Did not qualify (DNQ)
Black	Disqualified (DSQ)
White	Did not start (DNS)
White	Race cancelled (C)
Blank	Did not practice (DNP)
Blank	Excluded (EX)
Blank	Did not arrive (DNA)
Blank	Withdrawn (WD)
Blank	Did not enter (empty cell)
Annotation	Meaning
P	Pole position
F	Fastest lap

=== International Cup for F1 Manufacturers standings ===
Pos.	Manufacturer	RSA (South Africa)	MON (Monaco)	BEL (Belgium)	FRA (France)	GBR (United Kingdom)	NED (Netherlands)	GER (West Germany)	ITA (Italy)	USA (United States)	MEX (Mexico)	Pts.
1	(United Kingdom) Lotus-Climax	1	10	1	1	1	1	1	10	12	(3)	54 (58)
2	(United Kingdom) BRM	(3)	1	2	2	2	(2)	(2)	1	1	Ret	45 (61)
3	(United Kingdom) Brabham-Climax	8	7	4	(4)	(6)	3	3	3	2	2	27 (31)
4	(Italy) Ferrari	2	2	9	3	3	7	(6)	4	4	7	26 (27)
5	(United Kingdom) Cooper-Climax	5	5	3	Ret	10	Ret	4	5	6	Ret	14
6	(Japan) Honda		Ret	6	Ret	Ret	6		14	7	1	11
7	(United Kingdom) Brabham-BRM	7	6	8	6	8	11	Ret	Ret	11	4	5
8	(United Kingdom) Lotus-BRM	11	Ret	13	Ret	13	10	Ret	6	10	6	2
—	(United Kingdom) Brabham-Ford	9										0
—	(South Africa) Alfa Special-Alfa Romeo	10										0
—	(South Africa) LDS-Alfa Romeo	13										0
—	(United Kingdom) Cooper-Ford	DNQ				DNS						0
—	(South Africa) LDS-Climax	DNQ										0
—	(United Kingdom) Lotus-Ford	DNQ										0
Pos.	Manufacturer	RSA (South Africa)	MON (Monaco)	BEL (Belgium)	FRA (France)	GBR (United Kingdom)	NED (Netherlands)	GER (West Germany)	ITA (Italy)	USA (United States)	MEX (Mexico)	Pts.

- Bold results counted to championship totals.

== Non-championship races ==
Other Formula One races were also held in 1965, which did not count towards the World Championship. The last of them, the 1965 Rand Grand Prix, was the first Formula One race for cars with 3-litre engines.

Race Name	Circuit	Date	Winning driver	Constructor	Report
(South Africa) II Cape South Easter Trophy	Killarney	9 January	(Australia) Paul Hawkins	(United Kingdom) Brabham-Climax	Report
(United Kingdom) I Race of Champions	Brands Hatch	13 March	(United Kingdom) Mike Spence	(United Kingdom) Lotus-Climax	Report
(Italy) XIV Syracuse Grand Prix	Syracuse	4 April	(United Kingdom) Jim Clark	(United Kingdom) Lotus-Climax	Report
(United Kingdom) I Sunday Mirror Trophy	Goodwood	19 April	(United Kingdom) Jim Clark	(United Kingdom) Lotus-Climax	Report
(United Kingdom) XVII BRDC International Trophy	Silverstone	15 May	(United Kingdom) Jackie Stewart	(United Kingdom) BRM	Report
(Italy) IV Mediterranean Grand Prix	Pergusa	15 August	(Switzerland) Jo Siffert	(United Kingdom) Brabham-BRM	Report
(South Africa) VIII Rand Grand Prix	Kyalami	4 December	(Australia) Jack Brabham	(United Kingdom) Brabham-Climax	Report
