= 1965 German Grand Prix =

Race details
- Date: August 1, 1965
- Official name: XXVII Großer Preis von Deutschland
- Location: Nürburgring, Nürburg, West Germany
- Course: Permanent racing facility
- Course length: 22.810 km (14.168 miles)
- Distance: 15 laps, 342.15 km (212.52 miles)
- Weather: Overcast and dry

Pole position
Driver	(United Kingdom) Jim Clark	Lotus-Climax
- Time: 8:22.7

Fastest lap
Driver	(United Kingdom) Jim Clark	Lotus-Climax
- Time: 8:24.1 on lap 10

Podium
First	(United Kingdom) Jim Clark	Lotus-Climax
Second	(United Kingdom) Graham Hill	BRM
Third	(United States) Dan Gurney	Brabham-Climax

The 1965 German Grand Prix (formally the XXVII Großer Preis von Deutschland) was a Formula One motor race held at the Nürburgring on August 1, 1965. It was race 7 of 10 in both the 1965 World Championship of Drivers and the 1965 International Cup for Formula One Manufacturers. The 15-lap race was won by Jim Clark, who in his Lotus-Climax, took pole position, the fastest lap of the race, and led every lap. The victory ensured that Clark won the World Championship of Drivers with three races left to go. It also meant that Lotus won the 1965 International Cup for Formula One Manufacturers at the same time. BRM driver, Graham Hill, finished the race in second position in front of Brabham-Climax driver, Dan Gurney, who completed the podium by finishing third. Clark's victory was his 3rd grand slam of the season and the final grand slam of his career.

== Race report ==
Graham Hill could still theoretically overhaul Clark for the championship. However Clark became Champion with a masterful performance, leading from pole to the flag and setting fastest lap, to gain maximum points with 3 Grand Prix still to be run. Behind him, the rest of the pack had all sorts of mechanical problems: Surtees had gear selection problems, Stewart bent a wishbone, Hulme punctured his fuel tank when his seat worked loose, and Amon had transistor problems despite borrowing two transistor boxes. Clark was duly crowned as champion at the start of August, the earliest the championship had been won until 2002, when Michael Schumacher obtained his 5th title on July 21.

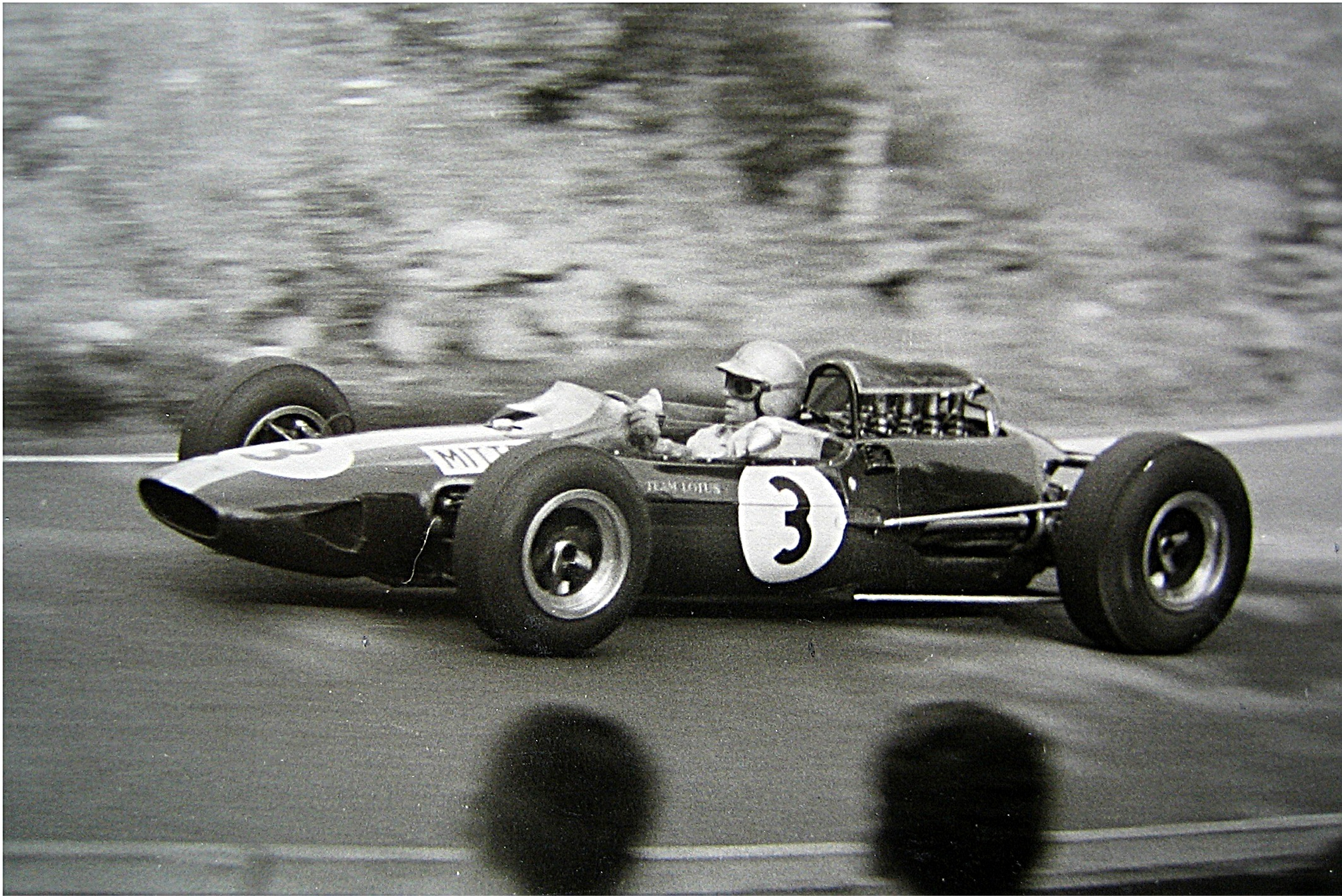
Gerhard Mitter in a Lotus 25.

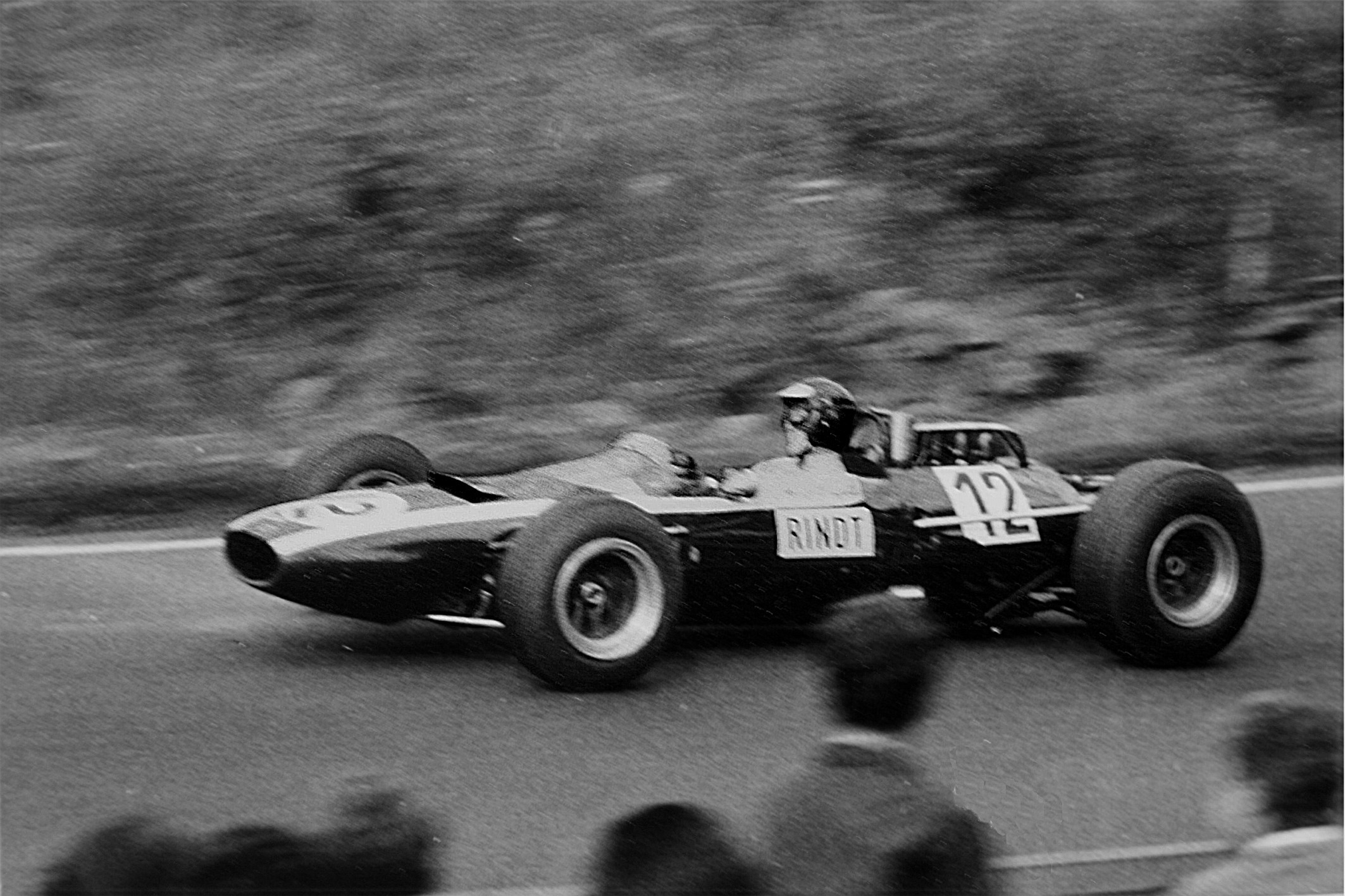
Jochen Rindt in a Cooper T77.

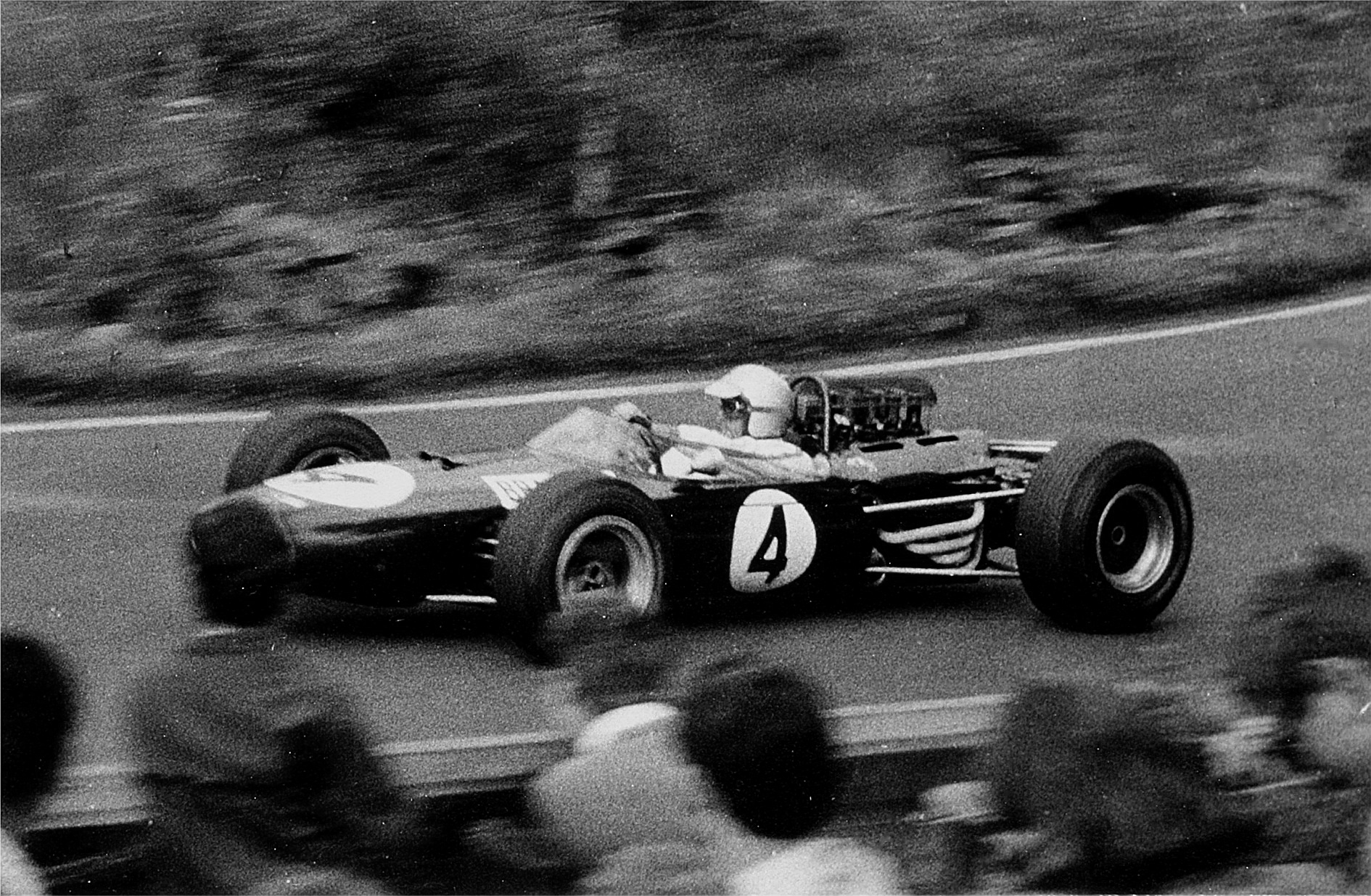
Jack Brabham in a Brabham BT11.

== Classification ==
=== Qualifying ===
Pos	No	Driver	Constructor	Time	Gap
1	1	(United Kingdom) Jim Clark	Lotus-Climax	8:22.7	—
2	10	(United Kingdom) Jackie Stewart	BRM	8:26.1	+3.4
3	9	(United Kingdom) Graham Hill	BRM	8:26.8	+4.1
4	7	(United Kingdom) John Surtees	Ferrari	8:27.0	+4.3
5	5	(United States) Dan Gurney	Brabham-Climax	8:29.0	+6.3
6	2	(United Kingdom) Mike Spence	Lotus-Climax	8:33.4	+10.7
7	8	(Italy) Lorenzo Bandini	Ferrari	8:33.8	+11.1
8	12	(Austria) Jochen Rindt	Cooper-Climax	8:37.5	+14.8
9	16	(Sweden) Jo Bonnier	Brabham-Climax	8:37.9	+15.2
10	11	(New Zealand) Bruce McLaren	Cooper-Climax	8:39.0	+16.3
11	17	(Switzerland) Jo Siffert	Brabham-BRM	8:39.6	+16.9
12	3	(West Germany) Gerhard Mitter	Lotus-Climax	8:40.4	+17.7
13	6	(New Zealand) Denny Hulme	Brabham-Climax	8:42.3	+19.6
14	4	(Australia) Jack Brabham	Brabham-Climax	8:44.9	+22.2
15	18	(United Kingdom) Bob Anderson	Brabham-Climax	8:47.4	+24.7
16	19	(New Zealand) Chris Amon	Lotus-BRM	8:50.5	+27.8
17	20	(United Kingdom) Richard Attwood	Lotus-BRM	8:57.7	+35.0
18	21	(Australia) Frank Gardner	Brabham-BRM	8:59.3	+36.6
19	24	(United States) Masten Gregory	BRM	9:14.3	+51.6
20	22	(Australia) Paul Hawkins	Lotus-Climax	9:16.8	+54.1
21	25	(Italy) Roberto Bussinello	BRM	9:17.7	+55.0
22	23	(United Kingdom) Ian Raby	Brabham-BRM	9:17.8	+55.1

=== Race ===
Pos	No	Driver	Constructor	Laps	Time/Retired	Grid	Points
1	1	(United Kingdom) Jim Clark	Lotus-Climax	15	2:07:52.4	1	9
2	9	(United Kingdom) Graham Hill	BRM	15	+15.9 secs	3	6
3	5	(United States) Dan Gurney	Brabham-Climax	15	+21.4 secs	5	4
4	12	(Austria) Jochen Rindt	Cooper-Climax	15	+3:29.6	8	3
5	4	(Australia) Jack Brabham	Brabham-Climax	15	+4:41.2	14	2
6	8	(Italy) Lorenzo Bandini	Ferrari	15	+5:08.6	7	1
7	16	(Sweden) Jo Bonnier	Brabham-Climax	15	+5:58.5	9	
8	24	(United States) Masten Gregory	BRM	14	+1 Lap	18	
Ret	7	(United Kingdom) John Surtees	Ferrari	11	Gearbox	4	
Ret	17	(Switzerland) Jo Siffert	Brabham-BRM	9	Engine	11	
Ret	2	(United Kingdom) Mike Spence	Lotus-Climax	8	Transmission	6	
Ret	3	(West Germany) Gerhard Mitter	Lotus-Climax	8	Water Leak	12	
Ret	20	(United Kingdom) Richard Attwood	Lotus-BRM	8	Water Leak	16	
Ret	11	(New Zealand) Bruce McLaren	Cooper-Climax	7	Gearbox	10	
Ret	6	(New Zealand) Denny Hulme	Brabham-Climax	5	Fuel Leak, Steering	13	
Ret	19	(New Zealand) Chris Amon	Lotus-BRM	3	Electrical	15	
Ret	22	(Australia) Paul Hawkins	Lotus-Climax	3	Oil Leak	19	
Ret	10	(United Kingdom) Jackie Stewart	BRM	2	Suspension	2	
Ret	21	(Australia) Frank Gardner	Brabham-BRM	0	Gearbox	17	
DNS	18	(United Kingdom) Bob Anderson	Brabham-Climax		Accident in practice		
DNQ	25	(Italy) Roberto Bussinello	BRM				
DNQ	23	(United Kingdom) Ian Raby	Brabham-BRM		Accident in practice		

== Championship standings after the race ==
- **Bold text** indicates the World Champions.

Drivers' Championship standings

	Pos	Driver	Points
	1	(United Kingdom) **Jim Clark**	54
	2	(United Kingdom) Graham Hill	30 (32)
	3	(United Kingdom) Jackie Stewart	25
	4	(United Kingdom) John Surtees	17
3	5	(United States) Dan Gurney	9

Constructors' Championship standings

Pos	Constructor	Points
1	(United Kingdom) **Lotus-Climax**	54
2	(United Kingdom) BRM	39 (43)
3	(Italy) Ferrari	21
4	(United Kingdom) Brabham-Climax	15
5	(United Kingdom) Cooper-Climax	11

- Notes: Only the top five positions are included for both sets of standings. Only best 6 results counted toward the championship. Numbers without parentheses are championship points, numbers in parentheses are total points scored.

Previous race: 1965 Dutch Grand Prix	FIA Formula One World Championship; 1965 season	Next race: 1965 Italian Grand Prix
Previous race: 1964 German Grand Prix	German Grand Prix	Next race: 1966 German Grand Prix
