= 1965 Monaco Grand Prix =

2nd round of the 1965 Formula One Championship

Coordinates: 43°44′4.74″N 7°25′16.8″E

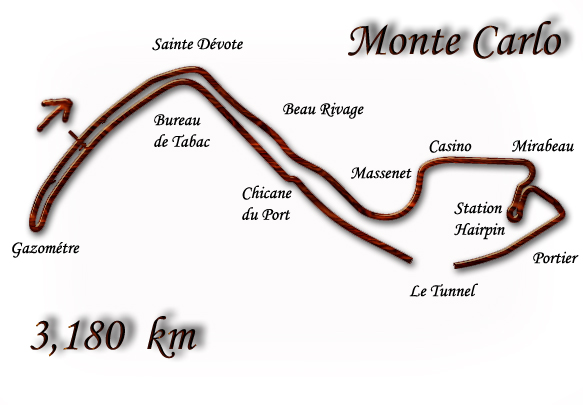

Race details
- Date: 30 May 1965
- Official name: XXIII Grand Prix de Monaco
- Location: Circuit de Monaco; Monte Carlo
- Course: Temporary street circuit
- Course length: 3.145 km (1.954 miles)
- Distance: 100 laps, 314.500 km (195.421 miles)

Pole position
Driver	(United Kingdom) Graham Hill	BRM
- Time: 1:32.5

Fastest lap
Driver	(United Kingdom) Graham Hill	BRM
- Time: 1:31.7 on lap 82

Podium
First	(United Kingdom) Graham Hill	BRM
Second	(Italy) Lorenzo Bandini	Ferrari
Third	(United Kingdom) Jackie Stewart	BRM

The 1965 Monaco Grand Prix was a Formula One motor race held at Monaco on 30 May 1965. It was race 2 of 10 in both the 1965 World Championship of Drivers and the 1965 International Cup for Formula One Manufacturers, albeit held almost five months after the first race of the season. The 100-lap race was won by BRM driver Graham Hill from pole position. Lorenzo Bandini finished second for the Ferrari team, and Hill's teammate Jackie Stewart came in third.

Jim Clark, Dan Gurney and Mike Spence of Team Lotus did not participate in the Grand Prix. The team instead chose to race in the 1965 Indy 500, held the following day, which Clark won. New Zealand driver and future World Champion Denny Hulme made his Formula One World Championship debut at this Grand Prix, finishing eighth.

As of 2026, this race marked the second and most recent time a driver has crashed into the harbour when Paul Hawkins fell in on lap 79. Alberto Ascari first crashed there during his accident at the 1955 Monaco Grand Prix.

== Background ==
After debuting with Brabham at the previous race, Honda also made use of Goodyear rather than Dunlop tires in this race.

== Race report ==
Hill and Stewart, both in BRMs, led the race from the start. Both spun, Hill after the car in front of him sprayed the track with parts, and Bandini took over the lead. Brabham, using the new, 32-valve Coventry Climax FWMV Mark 7 engine, overtook Bandini until the new engine blew up on the 43rd lap. Ferrari was now in first and second, with Bandini using the flat-twelve design (Ferrari 1512) while Surtees had opted for the V8-engined Ferrari 158. Hill, however, had stayed in the race and was steadily closing in. During the chase, the lap record was beaten several times. On lap 65, Hill had got past both Ferraris and went on to build up a sizable lead, eventually winning by over a minute. Surtees ran out of petrol on the last lap, allowing Stewart to pip him for third place, with McLaren and Siffert rounding out the points-paying positions.

== Classification ==
=== Qualifying ===
Pos	No	Driver	Constructor	Time	Gap
1	3	(United Kingdom) Graham Hill	BRM	1:32.5	
2	1	(Australia) Jack Brabham	Brabham–Climax	1:32.8	+0.3
3	4	(United Kingdom) Jackie Stewart	BRM	1:32.9	+0.4
4	17	(Italy) Lorenzo Bandini	Ferrari	1:33.0	+0.5
5	18	(United Kingdom) John Surtees	Ferrari	1:33.2	+0.7
6	15	(United Kingdom) Richard Attwood	Lotus–BRM	1:33.9	+1.4
7	7	(New Zealand) Bruce McLaren	Cooper–Climax	1:34.3	+1.8
8	2	(New Zealand) Denny Hulme	Brabham–Climax	1:34.5	+2.0
9	9	(United Kingdom) Bob Anderson	Brabham–Climax	1:35.5	+3.0
10	14	(Switzerland) Jo Siffert	Brabham–BRM	1:36.0	+3.5
11	11	(Australia) Frank Gardner	Brabham–BRM	1:36.0	+3.5
12	16	(United Kingdom) Mike Hailwood	Lotus–BRM	1:36.5	+4.0
13	12	(Sweden) Jo Bonnier	Brabham–Climax	1:36.5	+4.0
14	10	(Australia) Paul Hawkins	Lotus–Climax	1:37.0	+4.5
15	19	(United States) Ronnie Bucknum	Honda	1:37.0	+4.5
16	20	(United States) Richie Ginther	Honda	1:37.5	+5.0
17	8	(Austria) Jochen Rindt	Cooper–Climax	1:39.7	+7.2

=== Race ===
Pos	No	Driver	Constructor	Tyre	Laps	Time/Retired	Grid	Points
1	3	(United Kingdom) Graham Hill	BRM	D	100	2:37:39.6	1	9
2	17	(Italy) Lorenzo Bandini	Ferrari	D	100	+1:04.0	4	6
3	4	(United Kingdom) Jackie Stewart	BRM	D	100	+1:41.9	3	4
4	18	(United Kingdom) John Surtees	Ferrari	D	99	Out of Fuel	5	3
5	7	(New Zealand) Bruce McLaren	Cooper-Climax	D	98	+2 Laps	7	2
6	14	(Switzerland) Jo Siffert	Brabham-BRM	D	98	+2 Laps	10	1
7	12	(Sweden) Jo Bonnier	Brabham-Climax	D	97	+3 Laps	13	
8	2	(New Zealand) Denny Hulme	Brabham-Climax	G	92	+8 Laps	8	
9	9	(United Kingdom) Bob Anderson	Brabham-Climax	D	85	+15 Laps	9	
10	10	(Australia) Paul Hawkins	Lotus-Climax	D	79	Accident	14	
Ret	1	(Australia) Jack Brabham	Brabham-Climax	G	43	Engine	2	
Ret	15	(United Kingdom) Richard Attwood	Lotus-BRM	D	43	Wheel	6	
Ret	19	(United States) Ronnie Bucknum	Honda	G	33	Gearbox	15	
Ret	11	(Australia) Frank Gardner	Brabham-BRM	D	29	Engine	11	
Ret	16	(United Kingdom) Mike Hailwood	Lotus-BRM	D	12	Gearbox	12	
Ret	20	(United States) Richie Ginther	Honda	G	0	Halfshaft	16	
DNQ	8	(Austria) Jochen Rindt	Cooper-Climax	D				

== Championship standings after the race ==
Drivers' Championship standings

	Pos	Driver	Points
2	1	(United Kingdom) Graham Hill	13
1	2	(United Kingdom) Jim Clark	9
1	3	(United Kingdom) John Surtees	9
11	4	(Italy) Lorenzo Bandini	6
1	5	(United Kingdom) Jackie Stewart	5

Constructors' Championship standings

	Pos	Constructor	Points
2	1	(United Kingdom) BRM	13
	2	(Italy) Ferrari	12
2	3	(United Kingdom) Lotus-Climax	9
	4	(United Kingdom) Cooper-Climax	4
	5	(United Kingdom) Brabham-BRM	1

- Notes: Only the top five positions are included for both sets of standings.

Previous race: 1965 South African Grand Prix	FIA Formula One World Championship; 1965 season	Next race: 1965 Belgian Grand Prix
Previous race: 1964 Monaco Grand Prix	Monaco Grand Prix	Next race: 1966 Monaco Grand Prix
