= 1965 Belgian Grand Prix =

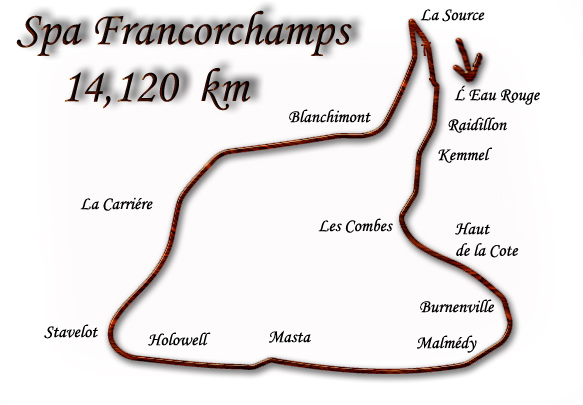

Race details
- Date: 13 June 1965
- Official name: XXV Grand Prix de Belgique
- Location: Spa-Francorchamps, Francorchamps, Belgium
- Course: Grand Prix Circuit
- Course length: 14.12 km (8.774 miles)
- Distance: 32 laps, 451.180 km (280.350 miles)
- Weather: Heavy rain

Pole position
Driver	(United Kingdom) Graham Hill	BRM
- Time: 3:45.4

Fastest lap
Driver	(United Kingdom) Jim Clark	Lotus-Climax
- Time: 4:12.9

Podium
First	(United Kingdom) Jim Clark	Lotus-Climax
Second	(United Kingdom) Jackie Stewart	BRM
Third	(New Zealand) Bruce McLaren	Cooper-Climax

The 1965 Belgian Grand Prix was a Formula One motor race held at Spa-Francorchamps on 13 June 1965. It was race 3 of 10 in both the 1965 World Championship of Drivers and the 1965 International Cup for Formula One Manufacturers. The race was won by British driver Jim Clark who led every lap of the race driving a Lotus 33. It was one of the Scot's most dominant wins. In the rain, he pulled away and with a third of the race to go, the Lotus driver was leading his fellow Scotsman Jackie Stewart by 1 minute and 20 seconds. However, for the last six laps Clark eased off dramatically and when the chequered flag was waved his lead was down to just under 45 seconds.

== Classification ==
=== Qualifying ===
Pos	No	Driver	Constructor	Time	Gap
1	7	(United Kingdom) Graham Hill	BRM	3:45.4	—
2	17	(United Kingdom) Jim Clark	Lotus-Climax	3:47.5	+2.1
3	8	(United Kingdom) Jackie Stewart	BRM	3:48.8	+3.4
4	10	(United States) Richie Ginther	Honda	3:49.0	+3.6
5	15	(United States) Dan Gurney	Brabham-Climax	3:49.2	+3.8
6	1	(United Kingdom) John Surtees	Ferrari	3:49.7	+4.3
7	20	(Sweden) Jo Bonnier	Brabham-Climax	3:50.7	+5.3
8	21	(Switzerland) Jo Siffert	Brabham-BRM	3:51.3	+5.9
9	4	(New Zealand) Bruce McLaren	Cooper-Climax	3:51.5	+6.1
10	14	(Australia) Jack Brabham	Brabham-Climax	3:52.3	+6.9
11	11	(United States) Ronnie Bucknum	Honda	3:52.6	+7.2
12	18	(United Kingdom) Mike Spence	Lotus-Climax	3:53.2	+7.8
13	23	(United Kingdom) Richard Attwood	Lotus-BRM	3:53.3	+7.9
14	5	(Austria) Jochen Rindt	Cooper-Climax	3:54.0	+8.6
15	2	(Italy) Lorenzo Bandini	Ferrari	3:57.4	+12.0
16	22	(United Kingdom) Innes Ireland	Lotus-BRM	3:59.0	+13.6
17	27	(Belgium) Lucien Bianchi	BRM	3:59.4	+14.0
18	26	(Australia) Frank Gardner	Brabham-BRM	3:59.4	+14.0
19	24	(United Kingdom) Bob Anderson	Brabham-Climax	3:59.8	+14.4
20	29	(United States) Masten Gregory	BRM	4:02.8	+17.4

=== Race ===
Pos	No	Driver	Constructor	Laps	Time/Retired	Grid	Points
1	17	(United Kingdom) Jim Clark	Lotus-Climax	32	2:23:34.8	2	9
2	8	(United Kingdom) Jackie Stewart	BRM	32	+44.8 secs	3	6
3	4	(New Zealand) Bruce McLaren	Cooper-Climax	31	+1 Lap	9	4
4	14	(Australia) Jack Brabham	Brabham-Climax	31	+1 Lap	10	3
5	7	(United Kingdom) Graham Hill	BRM	31	+1 Lap	1	2
6	10	(United States) Richie Ginther	Honda	31	+1 Lap	4	1
7	18	(United Kingdom) Mike Spence	Lotus-Climax	31	+1 Lap	12	
8	21	(Switzerland) Jo Siffert	Brabham-BRM	31	+1 Lap	8	
9	2	(Italy) Lorenzo Bandini	Ferrari	30	+2 Laps	15	
10	15	(United States) Dan Gurney	Brabham-Climax	30	+2 Laps	5	
11	5	(Austria) Jochen Rindt	Cooper-Climax	29	+3 Laps	14	
12	27	(Belgium) Lucien Bianchi	BRM	29	+3 Laps	17	
13	22	(United Kingdom) Innes Ireland	Lotus-BRM	27	+5 Laps	16	
14	23	(United Kingdom) Richard Attwood	Lotus-BRM	26	Accident	13	
Ret	29	(United States) Masten Gregory	BRM	12	Fuel pump	20	
Ret	20	(Sweden) Jo Bonnier	Brabham-Climax	9	Ignition	7	
Ret	11	(United States) Ronnie Bucknum	Honda	9	Gearbox	11	
Ret	1	(United Kingdom) John Surtees	Ferrari	5	Engine	6	
Ret	26	(Australia) Frank Gardner	Brabham-BRM	3	Ignition	18	
DNS	24	(United Kingdom) Bob Anderson	Brabham-Climax	0	Engine	19	
WD	28	(Belgium) Willy Mairesse	BRM		Too slow		

== Notes ==
- Jim Clark now held the sole record of four Belgian Grand Prix wins, breaking the old record of three wins set by Juan Manuel Fangio at the 1955 Belgian Grand Prix.
- This was the first Formula One World Championship point for Honda as a constructor and as an engine supplier, also the first for a Japanese and Asian constructor and engine supplier.
- A Coventry Climax-powered car now had won the Belgian Grand Prix a record five times, breaking the old record of four wins set by Ferrari at the 1961 Belgian Grand Prix.

== Championship standings after the race ==
Drivers' Championship standings

	Pos	Driver	Points
1	1	(United Kingdom) Jim Clark	18
1	2	(United Kingdom) Graham Hill	15
2	3	(United Kingdom) Jackie Stewart	11
1	4	(United Kingdom) John Surtees	9
1	5	(New Zealand) Bruce McLaren	8

Constructors' Championship standings

	Pos	Constructor	Points
	1	(United Kingdom) BRM	19
1	2	(United Kingdom) Lotus-Climax	18
1	3	(Italy) Ferrari	12
	4	(United Kingdom) Cooper-Climax	8
1	5	(United Kingdom) Brabham-Climax	3

- Notes: Only the top five positions are included for both sets of standings.

Previous race: 1965 Monaco Grand Prix	FIA Formula One World Championship; 1965 season	Next race: 1965 French Grand Prix
Previous race: 1964 Belgian Grand Prix	Belgian Grand Prix	Next race: 1966 Belgian Grand Prix
Previous race: 1964 British Grand Prix	European Grand Prix (Designated European Grand Prix)	Next race: 1966 French Grand Prix
