= 1965 Dutch Grand Prix =

- Zandvoort original layout

Race details
- Date: 18 July 1965
- Official name: XIII Grote Prijs van Nederland
- Location: Circuit Park Zandvoort; Zandvoort, Netherlands
- Course: Permanent racing facility
- Course length: 4.193 km (2.605 miles)
- Distance: 80 laps, 335.440 km (208.433 miles)

Pole position
Driver	(United Kingdom) Graham Hill	BRM
- Time: 1:30.7

Fastest lap
Driver	(United Kingdom) Jim Clark	Lotus-Climax
- Time: 1:30.6 on lap 5

Podium
First	(United Kingdom) Jim Clark	Lotus-Climax
Second	(United Kingdom) Jackie Stewart	BRM
Third	(United States) Dan Gurney	Brabham-Climax

The 1965 Dutch Grand Prix was a Formula One motor race held at Zandvoort on 18 July 1965. It was race 6 of 10 in both the 1965 World Championship of Drivers and the 1965 International Cup for Formula One Manufacturers. The 80-lap race was won by Lotus driver Jim Clark after he started from second position. Jackie Stewart finished second for the BRM team and Brabham driver Dan Gurney came in third.

== Race report ==
There was drama before the race when Lotus boss Colin Chapman punched a policeman, Chapman was arrested hours after the race but the Dutch police kept him in for two days.

Honda capitalised on their long hours of testing at Zandvoort when Ginther claimed a front-row space with Graham Hill and Clark. He shot into the lead for the first 2 laps. Hill took the lead and then Clark overtook him on lap 6. Hill fell back with rev counter problems and Stewart was left to duel with first Gurney and then Clark-ending up with a Scottish 1–2.

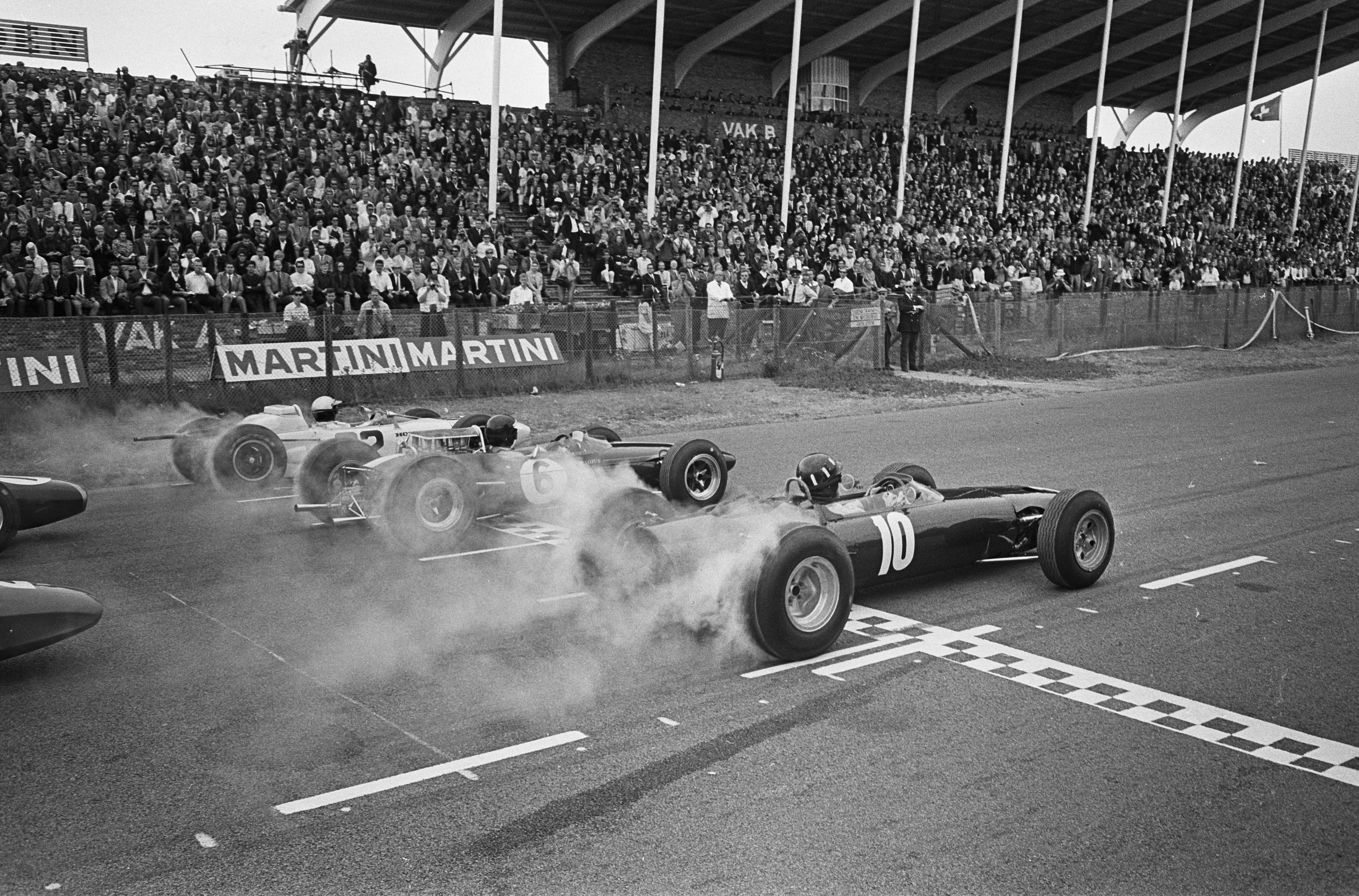
Richie Ginther, Jim Clark, and Graham Hill at the race start

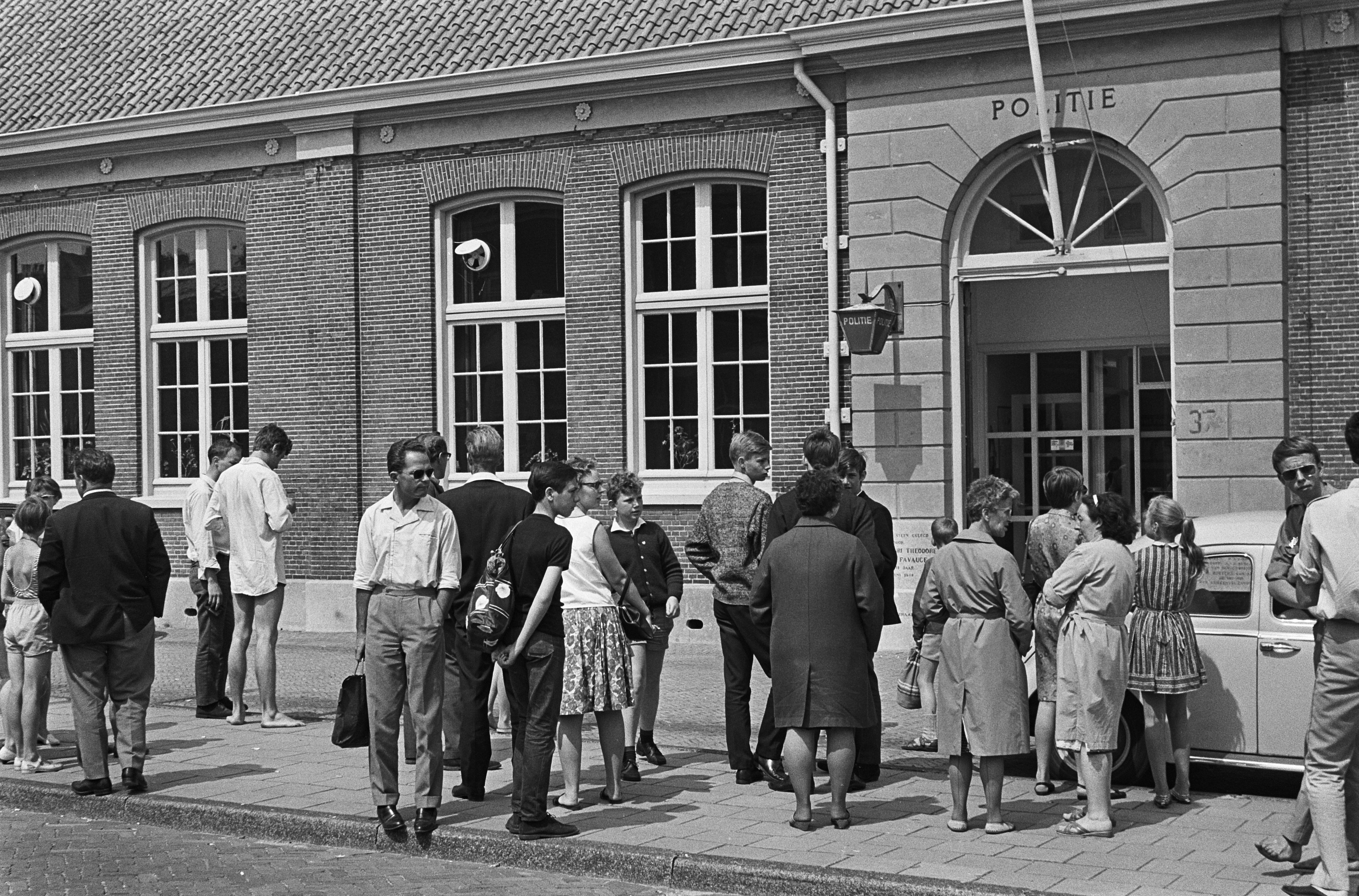
Journalists waiting on news of Team Lotus boss Colin Chapman, who was arrested for assaulting a police officer

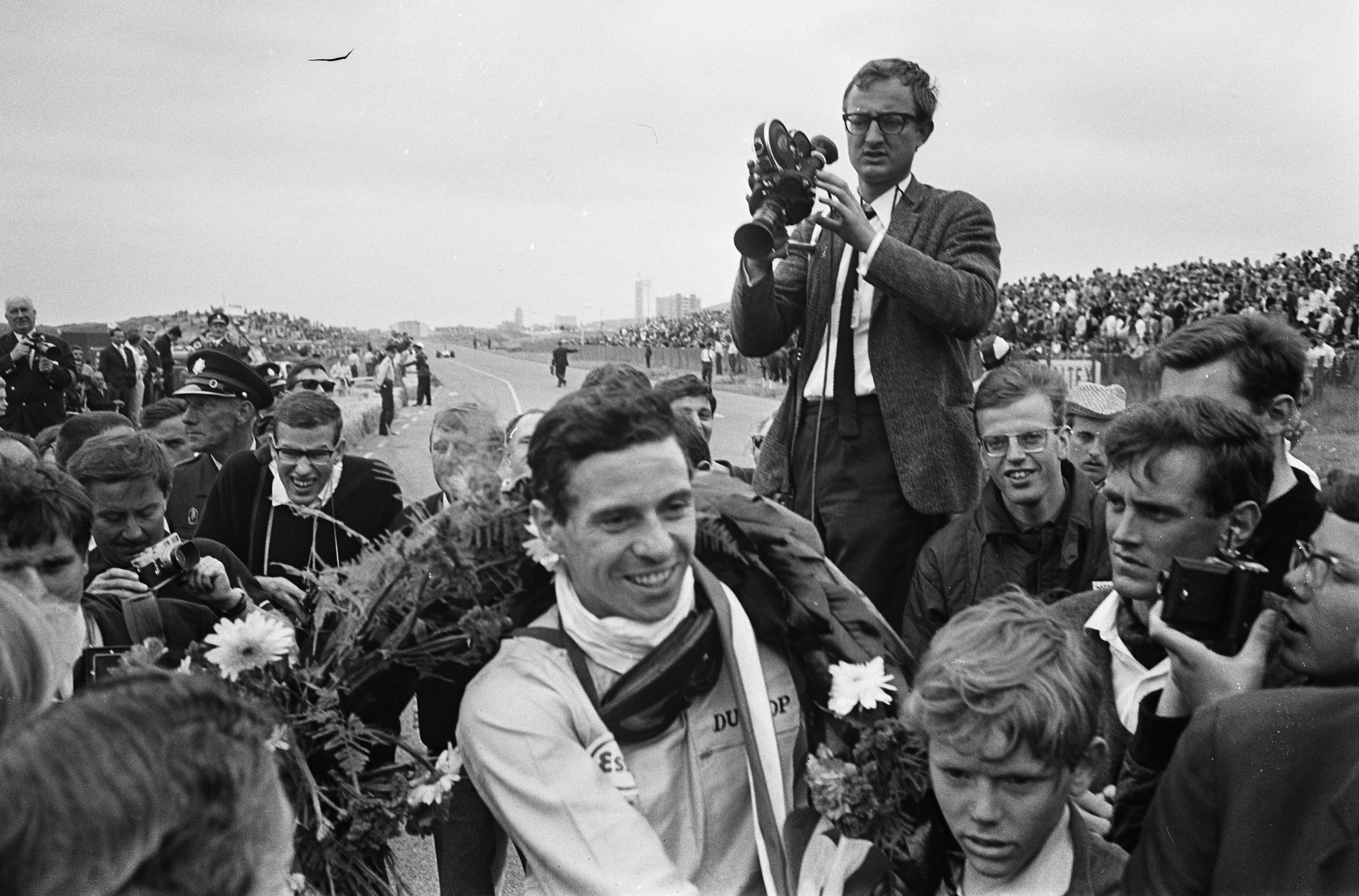
Jim Clark celebrating his win

== Classification ==
=== Qualifying ===
Pos	No	Driver	Constructor	Time	Gap
1	10	(United Kingdom) Graham Hill	BRM	1:30.7	—
2	6	(United Kingdom) Jim Clark	Lotus-Climax	1:31.0	+0.3
3	22	(United States) Richie Ginther	Honda	1:31.0	+0.3
4	2	(United Kingdom) John Surtees	Ferrari	1:31.0	+0.3
5	16	(United States) Dan Gurney	Brabham-Climax	1:31.2	+0.5
6	12	(United Kingdom) Jackie Stewart	BRM	1:31.4	+0.7
7	14	(New Zealand) Denny Hulme	Brabham-Climax	1:32.0	+1.3
8	8	(United Kingdom) Mike Spence	Lotus-Climax	1:32.2	+1.5
9	18	(New Zealand) Bruce McLaren	Cooper-Climax	1:32.6	+1.9
10	28	(Switzerland) Jo Siffert	Brabham-BRM	1:32.9	+2.2
11	30	(Australia) Frank Gardner	Brabham-BRM	1:32.9	+2.2
12	4	(Italy) Lorenzo Bandini	Ferrari	1:33.1	+2.4
13	38	(United Kingdom) Innes Ireland	Lotus-BRM	1:33.4	+2.7
14	20	(Austria) Jochen Rindt	Cooper-Climax	1:33.7	+3.0
15	26	(Sweden) Jo Bonnier	Brabham-Climax	1:33.8	+3.1
16	36	(United Kingdom) Bob Anderson	Brabham-Climax	1:34.1	+3.4
17	34	(United Kingdom) Richard Attwood	Lotus-BRM	1:34.6	+3.9

=== Race ===
Pos	No	Driver	Constructor	Laps	Time/Retired	Grid	Points
1	6	(United Kingdom) Jim Clark	Lotus-Climax	80	2:03:59.1	2	9
2	12	(United Kingdom) Jackie Stewart	BRM	80	+8.0 secs	6	6
3	16	(United States) Dan Gurney	Brabham-Climax	80	+13.0 secs	5	4
4	10	(United Kingdom) Graham Hill	BRM	80	+45.1 secs	1	3
5	14	(New Zealand) Denny Hulme	Brabham-Climax	79	+1 Lap	7	2
6	22	(United States) Richie Ginther	Honda	79	+1 Lap	3	1
7	2	(United Kingdom) John Surtees	Ferrari	79	+1 Lap	4	
8	8	(United Kingdom) Mike Spence	Lotus-Climax	79	+1 Lap	8	
9	4	(Italy) Lorenzo Bandini	Ferrari	79	+1 Lap	12	
10	38	(United Kingdom) Innes Ireland	Lotus-BRM	78	+2 Laps	13	
11	30	(Australia) Frank Gardner	Brabham-BRM	77	+3 Laps	11	
12	34	(United Kingdom) Richard Attwood	Lotus-BRM	77	+3 Laps	17	
13	28	(Switzerland) Jo Siffert	Brabham-BRM	55	+25 Laps	10	
Ret	20	(Austria) Jochen Rindt	Cooper-Climax	48	Oil Pressure	14	
Ret	18	(New Zealand) Bruce McLaren	Cooper-Climax	36	Differential	9	
Ret	26	(Sweden) Jo Bonnier	Brabham-Climax	16	Oil Leak	15	
Ret	36	(United Kingdom) Bob Anderson	Brabham-Climax	11	Engine	16	

== Notes ==
- This was Jim Clark's third win of a Dutch Grand Prix. He broke the old record of two wins at Zandvoort set by Alberto Ascari at the 1953 Dutch Grand Prix.
- This race also marked the fourth win for a Coventry Climax-powered car, breaking the old record of three wins at Zandvoort set by Ferrari at the 1961 Dutch Grand Prix.

== Championship standings after the race ==
Drivers' Championship standings

Pos	Driver	Points
1	(United Kingdom) Jim Clark	45
2	(United Kingdom) Graham Hill	26
3	(United Kingdom) Jackie Stewart	25
4	(United Kingdom) John Surtees	17
5	(New Zealand) Bruce McLaren	8

Constructors' Championship standings

	Pos	Constructor	Points
	1	(United Kingdom) Lotus-Climax	45
	2	(United Kingdom) BRM	37
	3	(Italy) Ferrari	20
1	4	(United Kingdom) Brabham-Climax	11
1	5	(United Kingdom) Cooper-Climax	8

- Notes: Only the top five positions are included for both sets of standings.

Previous race: 1965 British Grand Prix	FIA Formula One World Championship; 1965 season	Next race: 1965 German Grand Prix
Previous race: 1964 Dutch Grand Prix	Dutch Grand Prix	Next race: 1966 Dutch Grand Prix
