= Lotus Grand Prix results =

The first table below details the complete World Championship Grand Prix results of the Formula One constructor Team Lotus between 1958 and 1994. The second table includes results from privately owned Lotus cars in World Championship Grands Prix between 1958 and 1979. The tables do not include results for the separate Team Lotus Formula One team of 2011 (which debuted in 2010 as "Lotus Racing"), the Lotus Renault GP team of 2011 or the Lotus F1 Team of 2012.

== Complete Formula One World Championship results ==
=== Works team results ===
(key)

Year	Chassis	Engine	Tyres	Drivers	1	2	3	4	5	6	7	8	9	10	11	12	13	14	15	16	17	Points	WCC
1958	Lotus 16	Climax Straight-4	D		ARG	MON	NED	500	BEL	FRA	GBR	GER	POR	ITA	MOR							3	6th
1958	Lotus 16	Climax Straight-4	D	(United Kingdom) Graham Hill						Ret	Ret		Ret	6	16							3	6th
1958	Lotus 16	Climax Straight-4	D	(United Kingdom) Alan Stacey							Ret											3	6th
1958	Lotus 16	Climax Straight-4	D	(United Kingdom) Cliff Allison								10										3	6th
1958	Lotus 12	Climax Straight-4	D	(United Kingdom) Cliff Allison		6	6		4	Ret	Ret			7	10							3	6th
1958	Lotus 12	Climax Straight-4	D	(United Kingdom) Graham Hill		Ret	Ret		Ret													3	6th
1958	Lotus 16 F2	Climax Straight-4	D	(United Kingdom) Graham Hill								Ret										—N/a	—N/a
1959	Lotus 16	Climax Straight-4	D		MON	500	NED	FRA	GBR	GER	POR	ITA	USA									5	4th
1959	Lotus 16	Climax Straight-4	D	(United States) Pete Lovely	DNQ																	5	4th
1959	Lotus 16	Climax Straight-4	D	(United Kingdom) Graham Hill	Ret		7	Ret	9	Ret	Ret	Ret										5	4th
1959	Lotus 16	Climax Straight-4	D	(United Kingdom) Innes Ireland			4	Ret		Ret	Ret	Ret	5									5	4th
1959	Lotus 16	Climax Straight-4	D	(United Kingdom) Alan Stacey					8				Ret									5	4th
1960	Lotus 18	Climax Straight-4	D		ARG	MON	500	NED	BEL	FRA	GBR	POR	ITA	USA								34 (37)*	2nd
1960	Lotus 18	Climax Straight-4	D	(United Kingdom) Innes Ireland	6	9		2	Ret^{F}	7	3	6		2								34 (37)*	2nd
1960	Lotus 18	Climax Straight-4	D	(United Kingdom) Jim Clark				Ret	5	5	16	3		16								34 (37)*	2nd
1960	Lotus 18	Climax Straight-4	D	(United Kingdom) Ron Flockhart						6												34 (37)*	2nd
1960	Lotus 18	Climax Straight-4	D	(United Kingdom) John Surtees		Ret					2	Ret^{P}^{F}		Ret								34 (37)*	2nd
1960	Lotus 18	Climax Straight-4	D	(United Kingdom) Alan Stacey		Ret		Ret	Ret													34 (37)*	2nd
1960	Lotus 16	Climax Straight-4	D	(United Kingdom) Alan Stacey	Ret																	34 (37)*	2nd
1960	Lotus 16	Climax Straight-4	D	(Argentina) Alberto Rodríguez Larreta	9																	34 (37)*	2nd
1961	Lotus 21	Climax Straight-4	D		MON	NED	BEL	FRA	GBR	GER	ITA	USA										32*	2nd
1961	Lotus 21	Climax Straight-4	D	(United Kingdom) Jim Clark	10	3^{F}	12	3	Ret	4	Ret	7										32*	2nd
1961	Lotus 21	Climax Straight-4	D	(Belgium) Willy Mairesse				Ret														32*	2nd
1961	Lotus 21	Climax Straight-4	D	(United Kingdom) Innes Ireland	DNS		Ret	4	10	NC		1										32*	2nd
1961	Lotus 18	Climax Straight-4	D	(United Kingdom) Innes Ireland							Ret											32*	2nd
1961	Lotus 18	Climax Straight-4	D	(United Kingdom) Trevor Taylor		13																32*	2nd
1962	Lotus 25	Climax V8	D		NED	MON	BEL	FRA	GBR	GER	ITA	USA	RSA									36 (38)*	2nd
1962	Lotus 25	Climax V8	D	(United Kingdom) Jim Clark	9	Ret^{P}^{F}	1^{F}	Ret^{P}	1^{P}^{F}	4	Ret^{P}	1^{P}^{F}	Ret^{P}^{F}									36 (38)*	2nd
1962	Lotus 25	Climax V8	D	(United Kingdom) Trevor Taylor				8			Ret	12	Ret									36 (38)*	2nd
1962	Lotus 24	Climax V8	D	(United Kingdom) Trevor Taylor	2	Ret	Ret		8	Ret												36 (38)*	2nd
1963	Lotus 25	Climax V8	D		MON	BEL	NED	FRA	GBR	GER	ITA	USA	MEX	RSA								54 (74)	1st
1963	Lotus 25	Climax V8	D	(United Kingdom) Jim Clark	8^{P}	1^{F}	1^{P}^{F}	1^{P}^{F}	1^{P}	2^{P}	1^{F}	3^{F}	1^{P}^{F}	1^{P}								54 (74)	1st
1963	Lotus 25	Climax V8	D	(United Kingdom) Trevor Taylor	6	Ret	10	13	Ret	8		Ret	Ret	8								54 (74)	1st
1963	Lotus 25	Climax V8	D	(United Kingdom) Peter Arundell				DNS														54 (74)	1st
1963	Lotus 25	Climax V8	D	(United Kingdom) Mike Spence							13											54 (74)	1st
1963	Lotus 25	Climax V8	D	(Mexico) Pedro Rodríguez								Ret	Ret									54 (74)	1st
1964	Lotus 25	Climax V8	D		MON	NED	BEL	FRA	GBR	GER	AUT	ITA	USA	MEX								37 (40)	3rd
1964	Lotus 25	Climax V8	D	(United Kingdom) Jim Clark	4^{P}	1^{F}	1	Ret^{P}	1^{P}^{F}			Ret										37 (40)	3rd
1964	Lotus 25	Climax V8	D	(United Kingdom) Peter Arundell	3	3	9	4														37 (40)	3rd
1964	Lotus 25	Climax V8	D	(Germany) Gerhard Mitter						9												37 (40)	3rd
1964	Lotus 25	Climax V8	D	(United Kingdom) Mike Spence					9													37 (40)	3rd
1964	Lotus 33	Climax V8	D	(United Kingdom) Mike Spence						8	Ret	6	7	4								37 (40)	3rd
1964	Lotus 33	Climax V8	D	(United Kingdom) Jim Clark						Ret	Ret		7^{P}^{F}	5^{P}^{F}								37 (40)	3rd
1964	Lotus 33	Climax V8	D	(United States) Walt Hansgen									5									37 (40)	3rd
1964	Lotus 33	Climax V8	D	(Mexico) Moisés Solana										10								37 (40)	3rd
1965	Lotus 33	Climax V8	D		RSA	MON	BEL	FRA	GBR	NED	GER	ITA	USA	MEX								54 (58)	1st
1965	Lotus 33	Climax V8	D	(United Kingdom) Jim Clark	1^{P}^{F}		1^{F}		1^{P}	1^{F}	1^{P}^{F}	10^{P}^{F}	Ret	Ret^{P}								54 (58)	1st
1965	Lotus 33	Climax V8	D	(United Kingdom) Mike Spence	4		7	7	4		Ret	11	Ret	3								54 (58)	1st
1965	Lotus 25	Climax V8	D	(United Kingdom) Mike Spence						8												54 (58)	1st
1965	Lotus 25	Climax V8	D	(United Kingdom) Jim Clark				1^{P}^{F}														54 (58)	1st
1965	Lotus 25	Climax V8	D	(Germany) Gerhard Mitter							Ret											54 (58)	1st
1965	Lotus 25	Climax V8	D	(Italy) Giacomo Russo								Ret										54 (58)	1st
1965	Lotus 25	Climax V8	D	(Mexico) Moisés Solana									12	Ret								54 (58)	1st
1966	Lotus 33	Climax V8	F		MON	BEL	FRA	GBR	NED	GER	ITA	USA	MEX									8	6th
1966	Lotus 33	Climax V8	F	(Italy) Giacomo Russo							9											8	6th
1966	Lotus 33	Climax V8	F	(Mexico) Pedro Rodríguez			Ret						Ret									8	6th
1966	Lotus 33	Climax V8	F	(United Kingdom) Peter Arundell								6										8	6th
1966	Lotus 33	Climax V8	F	(United Kingdom) Jim Clark	Ret^{P}	Ret	DNS	4	3	Ret^{P}												8	6th
1966	Lotus 43	BRM H16	F	(United Kingdom) Jim Clark							Ret	1	Ret									13*	5th
1966	Lotus 43	BRM H16	F	(United Kingdom) Peter Arundell		DNS	Ret															13*	5th
1966	Lotus 33	BRM V8	F	(United Kingdom) Peter Arundell				Ret	Ret	8	8		7									13*	5th
1966	Lotus 33	BRM V8	F	(Mexico) Pedro Rodríguez								Ret										13*	5th
1966	Lotus 44 F2	Cosworth Straight-4	F	(Mexico) Pedro Rodríguez						Ret												—N/a	—N/a
1966	Lotus 44 F2	Cosworth Straight-4	F	(Germany) Gerhard Mitter						DNS												—N/a	—N/a
1966	Lotus 44 F2	Cosworth Straight-4	F	(United Kingdom) Piers Courage						Ret												—N/a	—N/a
1967	Lotus 33	BRM V8	F		RSA	MON	NED	BEL	FRA	GBR	GER	CAN	ITA	USA	MEX							6	8th
1967	Lotus 33	BRM V8	F	(United Kingdom) Graham Hill		2																6	8th
1967	Lotus 43	BRM H16	F	(United Kingdom) Graham Hill	Ret																	6	8th
1967	Lotus 43	BRM H16	F	(United Kingdom) Jim Clark	Ret																	6	8th
1967	Lotus 33	Climax V8	F	(United Kingdom) Jim Clark		Ret^{F}																0	NC
1967	Lotus 49	Ford Cosworth DFV	F	(United Kingdom) Jim Clark			1^{F}	6^{P}	Ret	1^{P}	Ret^{P}	Ret^{P}^{F}	3^{P}^{F}	1	1^{P}^{F}							44	2nd
1967	Lotus 49	Ford Cosworth DFV	F	(United Kingdom) Graham Hill			Ret^{P}	Ret^{F}	Ret^{P}	Ret	Ret	4	Ret	2^{P}^{F}	Ret							44	2nd
1967	Lotus 49	Ford Cosworth DFV	F	(Canada) Eppie Wietzes								DSQ										44	2nd
1967	Lotus 49	Ford Cosworth DFV	F	(Italy) Giancarlo Baghetti									Ret									44	2nd
1967	Lotus 49	Ford Cosworth DFV	F	(Mexico) Moisés Solana										Ret	Ret							44	2nd
1967	Lotus 48 F2	Ford Cosworth FVA	F	(United Kingdom) Jackie Oliver							5											—N/a	—N/a
1968	Lotus 49	Ford Cosworth DFV	F		RSA	ESP	MON	BEL	NED	FRA	GBR	GER	ITA	CAN	USA	MEX						62*	1st
1968	Lotus 49	Ford Cosworth DFV	F	(United Kingdom) Jim Clark	1^{P}^{F}																	62*	1st
1968	Lotus 49	Ford Cosworth DFV	F	(United Kingdom) Jackie Oliver			Ret															62*	1st
1968	Lotus 49	Ford Cosworth DFV	F	(United Kingdom) Graham Hill	2	1																62*	1st
1968	Lotus 49B	Ford Cosworth DFV	F	(United Kingdom) Graham Hill			1^{P}	Ret	9	Ret	Ret^{P}	2	Ret	4	2	1						62*	1st
1968	Lotus 49B	Ford Cosworth DFV	F	(United Kingdom) Jackie Oliver				5	NC	DNS	Ret	11	Ret^{F}	Ret	DNS	3						62*	1st
1968	Lotus 49B	Ford Cosworth DFV	F	(Canada) Bill Brack										Ret								62*	1st
1968	Lotus 49B	Ford Cosworth DFV	F	(United States) Mario Andretti									DNS		Ret^{P}							62*	1st
1968	Lotus 49B	Ford Cosworth DFV	F	(Mexico) Moisés Solana												Ret						62*	1st
1969	Lotus 49B	Ford Cosworth DFV	F		RSA	ESP	MON	NED	FRA	GBR	GER	ITA	CAN	USA	MEX							47*	3rd
1969	Lotus 49B	Ford Cosworth DFV	F	(United Kingdom) Graham Hill	2	Ret	1	7	6	7	4	9	Ret	Ret								47*	3rd
1969	Lotus 49B	Ford Cosworth DFV	F	(Austria) Jochen Rindt	Ret	Ret^{P}^{F}		Ret^{P}	Ret	4^{P}	Ret	2^{P}	3	1^{P}^{F}	Ret							47*	3rd
1969	Lotus 49B	Ford Cosworth DFV	F	(United Kingdom) Richard Attwood			4															47*	3rd
1969	Lotus 49B	Ford Cosworth DFV	F	(United States) Mario Andretti	Ret																	47*	3rd
1969	Lotus 63	Ford Cosworth DFV	F	(United States) Mario Andretti							Ret			Ret								47*	3rd
1969	Lotus 63	Ford Cosworth DFV	F	(United Kingdom) John Miles					Ret	10		Ret	Ret		Ret							47*	3rd
1970	Lotus 49C	Ford Cosworth DFV	F		RSA	ESP	MON	BEL	NED	FRA	GBR	GER	AUT	ITA	CAN	USA	MEX					59*	1st
1970	Lotus 49C	Ford Cosworth DFV	F	(Austria) Jochen Rindt	13		1^{F}	Ret														59*	1st
1970	Lotus 49C	Ford Cosworth DFV	F	(Brazil) Emerson Fittipaldi							8	4	15									59*	1st
1970	Lotus 49C	Ford Cosworth DFV	F	(United Kingdom) John Miles	5		DNQ															59*	1st
1970	Lotus 49C	Ford Cosworth DFV	F	(Spain) Alex Soler-Roig		DNQ				DNQ												59*	1st
1970	Lotus 72	Ford Cosworth DFV	F	(Spain) Alex Soler-Roig				DNS														59*	1st
1970	Lotus 72	Ford Cosworth DFV	F	(United Kingdom) John Miles		DNQ		Ret	7	8	Ret	Ret										59*	1st
1970	Lotus 72	Ford Cosworth DFV	F	(Austria) Jochen Rindt		Ret																59*	1st
1970	Lotus 72C	Ford Cosworth DFV	F	(Austria) Jochen Rindt					1^{P}	1	1^{P}	1	Ret^{P}	DNS								59*	1st
1970	Lotus 72C	Ford Cosworth DFV	F	(United Kingdom) John Miles									Ret	DNS								59*	1st
1970	Lotus 72C	Ford Cosworth DFV	F	(Brazil) Emerson Fittipaldi										DNS		1	Ret					59*	1st
1970	Lotus 72C	Ford Cosworth DFV	F	(Sweden) Reine Wisell												3	NC					59*	1st
1971	Lotus 72C	Ford Cosworth DFV	F		RSA	ESP	MON	NED	FRA	GBR	GER	AUT	ITA	CAN	USA							21	5th
1971	Lotus 72C	Ford Cosworth DFV	F	(Brazil) Emerson Fittipaldi	Ret	Ret																21	5th
1971	Lotus 72C	Ford Cosworth DFV	F	(Sweden) Reine Wisell	4	NC	Ret															21	5th
1971	Lotus 72D	Ford Cosworth DFV	F	(Sweden) Reine Wisell				DSQ	6		8	4		5	Ret							21	5th
1971	Lotus 72D	Ford Cosworth DFV	F	(South Africa) Dave Charlton				DNS		Ret												21	5th
1971	Lotus 72D	Ford Cosworth DFV	F	(Brazil) Emerson Fittipaldi			5		3	3	Ret	2		7	NC							21	5th
1971	Lotus 56B	Pratt & Whitney turbine	F	(Brazil) Emerson Fittipaldi									8									0	NC
1971	Lotus 56B	Pratt & Whitney turbine	F	(Australia) David Walker				Ret														0	NC
1971	Lotus 56B	Pratt & Whitney turbine	F	(Sweden) Reine Wisell						NC												0	NC
1972	Lotus 72D	Ford Cosworth DFV	F		ARG	RSA	ESP	MON	BEL	FRA	GBR	GER	AUT	ITA	CAN	USA						61	1st
1972	Lotus 72D	Ford Cosworth DFV	F	(Brazil) Emerson Fittipaldi	Ret	2	1	3^{P}	1^{P}	2	1	Ret	1^{P}	1	11	Ret						61	1st
1972	Lotus 72D	Ford Cosworth DFV	F	(Australia) David Walker	DSQ	10	9	14	14	18	Ret	Ret	Ret			Ret						61	1st
1972	Lotus 72D	Ford Cosworth DFV	F	(Sweden) Reine Wisell											Ret	10						61	1st
1973	Lotus 72D	Ford Cosworth DFV	G		ARG	BRA	RSA	ESP	BEL	MON	SWE	FRA	GBR	NED	GER	AUT	ITA	CAN	USA			92 (96)	1st
1973	Lotus 72D	Ford Cosworth DFV	G	(Brazil) Emerson Fittipaldi	1^{F}	1^{F}	3^{F}															92 (96)	1st
1973	Lotus 72D	Ford Cosworth DFV	G	(Sweden) Ronnie Peterson	Ret	Ret^{P}	11															92 (96)	1st
1973	Lotus 72E	Ford Cosworth DFV	G	(Sweden) Ronnie Peterson				Ret^{P}^{F}	Ret^{P}	3	2^{P}	1	2^{P}	11^{P}^{F}	Ret	1	1^{P}	Ret^{P}	1^{P}			92 (96)	1st
1973	Lotus 72E	Ford Cosworth DFV	G	(Brazil) Emerson Fittipaldi				1	3	2^{F}	12	Ret	Ret	Ret	6	Ret^{P}	2	2^{F}	6			92 (96)	1st
1974	Lotus 72E	Ford Cosworth DFV	G		ARG	BRA	RSA	ESP	BEL	MON	SWE	NED	FRA	GBR	GER	AUT	ITA	CAN	USA			42	4th
1974	Lotus 72E	Ford Cosworth DFV	G	(Sweden) Ronnie Peterson	13^{P}	6				1^{F}	Ret	8^{F}	1	10		Ret	1	3	Ret			42	4th
1974	Lotus 72E	Ford Cosworth DFV	G	(Belgium) Jacky Ickx	Ret	3				Ret	Ret	11	5	3	5			13	Ret			42	4th
1974	Lotus 76	Ford Cosworth DFV	G	(Belgium) Jacky Ickx			Ret	Ret	Ret							Ret	Ret					42	4th
1974	Lotus 76	Ford Cosworth DFV	G	(Sweden) Ronnie Peterson			Ret	Ret	Ret						4							42	4th
1974	Lotus 76	Ford Cosworth DFV	G	(Australia) Tim Schenken															DSQ			42	4th
1975	Lotus 72E	Ford Cosworth DFV	G		ARG	BRA	RSA	ESP	MON	BEL	SWE	NED	FRA	GBR	GER	AUT	ITA	USA				9	7th
1975	Lotus 72E	Ford Cosworth DFV	G	(Sweden) Ronnie Peterson	Ret	15	10	Ret	4	Ret	9	15	10	Ret	Ret	5^{‡}	Ret	5				9	7th
1975	Lotus 72E	Ford Cosworth DFV	G	(Belgium) Jacky Ickx	8	9	12	2^{‡}	8	Ret	15	Ret	Ret									9	7th
1975	Lotus 72F	Ford Cosworth DFV	G	(United Kingdom) Jim Crawford										Ret			13					9	7th
1975	Lotus 72F	Ford Cosworth DFV	G	(United Kingdom) John Watson											Ret							9	7th
1975	Lotus 72F	Ford Cosworth DFV	G	(United Kingdom) Brian Henton												DNS		NC				9	7th
1975	Lotus 72F	Ford Cosworth DFV	G	(United Kingdom) Brian Henton										16								9	7th
1976	Lotus 77	Ford Cosworth DFV	G		BRA	RSA	USW	ESP	BEL	MON	SWE	FRA	GBR	GER	AUT	NED	ITA	CAN	USA	JPN		29	4th
1976	Lotus 77	Ford Cosworth DFV	G	(Sweden) Ronnie Peterson	Ret																	29	4th
1976	Lotus 77	Ford Cosworth DFV	G	(United Kingdom) Bob Evans		10	DNQ															29	4th
1976	Lotus 77	Ford Cosworth DFV	G	(United States) Mario Andretti				Ret	Ret		Ret^{F}	5	Ret	12	5	3	Ret	3	Ret	1^{P}		29	4th
1976	Lotus 77	Ford Cosworth DFV	G	(United States) Mario Andretti	Ret																	29	4th
1976	Lotus 77	Ford Cosworth DFV	G	(Sweden) Gunnar Nilsson		Ret	Ret	3	Ret	Ret	Ret	Ret	Ret	5	3	Ret	13	12	Ret	6		29	4th
1977	Lotus 78	Ford Cosworth DFV	G		ARG	BRA	RSA	USW	ESP	MON	BEL	SWE	FRA	GBR	GER	AUT	NED	ITA	USA	CAN	JPN	62	2nd
1977	Lotus 78	Ford Cosworth DFV	G	(United States) Mario Andretti	5	Ret	Ret	1	1^{P}	5	Ret^{P}	6^{P}^{F}	1^{P}	14	Ret	Ret	Ret^{P}	1^{F}	2	9^{P}^{F}	Ret^{P}	62	2nd
1977	Lotus 78	Ford Cosworth DFV	G	(Sweden) Gunnar Nilsson	DNS	5	12	8	5	Ret	1^{F}	19	4	3	Ret	Ret	Ret	Ret	Ret	Ret	Ret	62	2nd
1978	Lotus 78	Ford Cosworth DFV	G		ARG	BRA	RSA	USW	MON	BEL	ESP	SWE	FRA	GBR	GER	AUT	NED	ITA	USA	CAN		86	1st
1978	Lotus 78	Ford Cosworth DFV	G	(United States) Mario Andretti	1^{P}	4	7^{F}	2	11													86	1st
1978	Lotus 78	Ford Cosworth DFV	G	(Sweden) Ronnie Peterson	5	Ret^{P}	1	4	Ret	2^{F}								Ret				86	1st
1978	Lotus 79	Ford Cosworth DFV	G	(Sweden) Ronnie Peterson							2	3	2	Ret^{P}	Ret^{F}	1^{P}^{F}	2					86	1st
1978	Lotus 79	Ford Cosworth DFV	G	(United States) Mario Andretti						1^{P}	1^{P}^{F}	Ret^{P}	1	Ret	1^{P}	Ret	1^{P}	6^{P}^{F}	Ret^{P}	10		86	1st
1978	Lotus 79	Ford Cosworth DFV	G	(France) Jean-Pierre Jarier															15^{F}	Ret^{P}		86	1st
1979	Lotus 80	Ford Cosworth DFV	G		ARG	BRA	RSA	USW	ESP	BEL	MON	FRA	GBR	GER	AUT	NED	ITA	CAN	USA			39	4th
1979	Lotus 80	Ford Cosworth DFV	G	(United States) Mario Andretti					3		Ret	Ret										39	4th
1979	Lotus 79	Ford Cosworth DFV	G	(United States) Mario Andretti	5	Ret	4	4		Ret			Ret	Ret	Ret	Ret	5	10	Ret			39	4th
1979	Lotus 79	Ford Cosworth DFV	G	(Argentina) Carlos Reutemann	2	3	5	Ret	2	4	3	13	8	Ret	Ret	Ret	7	Ret	Ret			39	4th
1980	Lotus 81	Ford Cosworth DFV	G		ARG	BRA	RSA	USW	BEL	MON	FRA	GBR	GER	AUT	NED	ITA	CAN	USA				14	5th
1980	Lotus 81	Ford Cosworth DFV	G	(United States) Mario Andretti	Ret	Ret	12	Ret	Ret	7	Ret	Ret	7	Ret	8	Ret	Ret	6				14	5th
1980	Lotus 81	Ford Cosworth DFV	G	(Italy) Elio de Angelis	Ret	2	Ret	Ret	10	9	Ret	Ret	16	6	Ret	4	10	4				14	5th
1980	Lotus 81B	Ford Cosworth DFV	G	(United Kingdom) Nigel Mansell										Ret	Ret	DNQ						14	5th
1981	Lotus 81B	Ford Cosworth DFV	M G		USW	BRA	ARG	SMR	BEL	MON	ESP	FRA	GBR	GER	AUT	NED	ITA	CAN	CPL			22	7th
1981	Lotus 81B	Ford Cosworth DFV	M G	(Italy) Elio de Angelis	Ret	5	6		5													22	7th
1981	Lotus 81B	Ford Cosworth DFV	M G	(United Kingdom) Nigel Mansell	Ret	11	Ret		3													22	7th
1981	Lotus 87	Ford Cosworth DFV	M G	(United Kingdom) Nigel Mansell						Ret	6	7	DNQ	Ret	Ret	Ret	Ret	Ret	4			22	7th
1981	Lotus 87	Ford Cosworth DFV	M G	(Italy) Elio de Angelis						Ret	5	6	DSQ	7	7	5	4	6	Ret			22	7th
1982	Lotus 87B	Ford Cosworth DFV	G		RSA	BRA	USW	SMR	BEL	MON	DET	CAN	NED	GBR	FRA	GER	AUT	SUI	ITA	CPL		30	6th
1982	Lotus 87B	Ford Cosworth DFV	G	(Italy) Elio de Angelis	8																	30	6th
1982	Lotus 87B	Ford Cosworth DFV	G	(United Kingdom) Nigel Mansell	Ret																	30	6th
1982	Lotus 91	Ford Cosworth DFV	G	(United Kingdom) Nigel Mansell		3	7		Ret	4	Ret	Ret		Ret		9	Ret	8	7	Ret		30	6th
1982	Lotus 91	Ford Cosworth DFV	G	(Brazil) Roberto Moreno									DNQ									30	6th
1982	Lotus 91	Ford Cosworth DFV	G	(United Kingdom) Geoff Lees											12							30	6th
1982	Lotus 91	Ford Cosworth DFV	G	(Italy) Elio de Angelis		Ret	5		4	5	Ret	4	Ret	4	Ret	Ret	1	6	Ret	Ret		30	6th
1983	Lotus 92	Ford Cosworth DFV	P		BRA	USW	FRA	SMR	MON	BEL	DET	CAN	GBR	GER	AUT	NED	ITA	EUR	RSA			1	12th
1983	Lotus 92	Ford Cosworth DFV	P	(United Kingdom) Nigel Mansell	12	12	Ret	12^{†}	Ret	Ret	6	Ret										1	12th
1983	Lotus 91	Ford Cosworth DFV	P	(Italy) Elio de Angelis	DSQ																	1	12th
1983	Lotus 93T	Renault V6 (t/c)	P	(Italy) Elio de Angelis		Ret	Ret	Ret	Ret	9	Ret	Ret										11	8th
1983	Lotus 93T	Renault V6 (t/c)	P	(United Kingdom) Nigel Mansell										Ret								11	8th
1983	Lotus 94T	Renault V6 (t/c)	P	(United Kingdom) Nigel Mansell									4		5	Ret	8	3^{F}	NC			11	8th
1983	Lotus 94T	Renault V6 (t/c)	P	(Italy) Elio de Angelis									Ret	Ret	Ret	Ret	5	Ret^{P}	Ret			11	8th
1984	Lotus 95T	Renault V6 (t/c)	G		BRA	RSA	BEL	SMR	FRA	MON	CAN	DET	DAL	GBR	GER	AUT	NED	ITA	EUR	POR		47	3rd
1984	Lotus 95T	Renault V6 (t/c)	G	(United Kingdom) Nigel Mansell	Ret	Ret	Ret	Ret	3	Ret	6	Ret	6^{P}^{†}	Ret	4	Ret	3	Ret	Ret	Ret		47	3rd
1984	Lotus 95T	Renault V6 (t/c)	G	(Italy) Elio de Angelis	3^{P}	7	5	3	5	5^{‡}	4	2	3	4	Ret	Ret	4	Ret	Ret	5		47	3rd
1985	Lotus 97T	Renault V6 (t/c)	G		BRA	POR	SMR	MON	CAN	DET	FRA	GBR	GER	AUT	NED	ITA	BEL	EUR	RSA	AUS		71	4th
1985	Lotus 97T	Renault V6 (t/c)	G	(Brazil) Ayrton Senna	Ret	1^{P}^{F}	7^{P}^{†}	Ret^{P}	16^{F}	Ret^{P}^{F}	Ret	10^{†}	Ret	2	3	3^{P}	1	2^{P}	Ret	Ret^{P}		71	4th
1985	Lotus 97T	Renault V6 (t/c)	G	(Italy) Elio de Angelis	3	4	1	3	5^{P}	5	5	NC	Ret	5	5	6	Ret	5	Ret	DSQ		71	4th
1986	Lotus 98T	Renault V6 (t/c)	G		BRA	ESP	SMR	MON	BEL	CAN	DET	FRA	GBR	GER	HUN	AUT	ITA	POR	MEX	AUS		58	3rd
1986	Lotus 98T	Renault V6 (t/c)	G	(Brazil) Ayrton Senna	2^{P}	1^{P}	Ret^{P}	3	2	5	1^{P}	Ret^{P}	Ret	2	2^{P}	Ret	Ret	4^{P}	3^{P}	Ret		58	3rd
1986	Lotus 98T	Renault V6 (t/c)	G	(United Kingdom) Johnny Dumfries	9	Ret	Ret	DNQ	Ret	Ret	7	Ret	7	Ret	5	Ret	Ret	9	Ret	6		58	3rd
1987	Lotus 99T	Honda V6 (t/c)	G		BRA	SMR	BEL	MON	DET	FRA	GBR	GER	HUN	AUT	ITA	POR	ESP	MEX	JPN	AUS		64	3rd
1987	Lotus 99T	Honda V6 (t/c)	G	(Brazil) Ayrton Senna	Ret	2^{P}	Ret	1^{F}	1^{F}	4	3	3	2	5	2^{F}	7	5	Ret	2	DSQ		64	3rd
1987	Lotus 99T	Honda V6 (t/c)	G	(Japan) Satoru Nakajima	7	6	5	10	Ret	NC	4	Ret	Ret	13	11	8	9	Ret	6	Ret		64	3rd
1988	Lotus 100T	Honda V6 (t/c)	G		BRA	SMR	MON	MEX	CAN	DET	FRA	GBR	GER	HUN	BEL	ITA	POR	ESP	JPN	AUS		23	4th
1988	Lotus 100T	Honda V6 (t/c)	G	(Brazil) Nelson Piquet	3	3	Ret	Ret	4	Ret	5	5	Ret	8	4	Ret	Ret	8	Ret	3		23	4th
1988	Lotus 100T	Honda V6 (t/c)	G	(Japan) Satoru Nakajima	6	8	DNQ	Ret	11	DNQ	7	10	9	7	Ret	Ret	Ret	Ret	7	Ret		23	4th
1989	Lotus 101	Judd V8	G		BRA	SMR	MON	MEX	USA	CAN	FRA	GBR	GER	HUN	BEL	ITA	POR	ESP	JPN	AUS		15	6th
1989	Lotus 101	Judd V8	G	(Brazil) Nelson Piquet	Ret	Ret	Ret	11	Ret	4	8	4	5	6	DNQ	Ret	Ret	8	4	Ret		15	6th
1989	Lotus 101	Judd V8	G	(Japan) Satoru Nakajima	8	NC	DNQ	Ret	Ret	DNQ	Ret	8	Ret	Ret	DNQ	10	7	Ret	Ret	4^{F}		15	6th
1990	Lotus 102	Lamborghini V12	G		USA	BRA	SMR	MON	CAN	MEX	FRA	GBR	GER	HUN	BEL	ITA	POR	ESP	JPN	AUS		3	8th
1990	Lotus 102	Lamborghini V12	G	(United Kingdom) Derek Warwick	Ret	Ret	7	Ret	6	10	11	Ret	8	5	11	Ret	Ret	Ret	Ret	Ret		3	8th
1990	Lotus 102	Lamborghini V12	G	(United Kingdom) Martin Donnelly	DNS	Ret	8	Ret	Ret	8	12	Ret	Ret	7	12	Ret	Ret	DNS				3	8th
1990	Lotus 102	Lamborghini V12	G	(United Kingdom) Johnny Herbert															Ret	Ret		3	8th
1991	Lotus 102B	Judd V8	G		USA	BRA	SMR	MON	CAN	MEX	FRA	GBR	GER	HUN	BEL	ITA	POR	ESP	JPN	AUS		3	9th
1991	Lotus 102B	Judd V8	G	(Finland) Mika Häkkinen	Ret	9	5	Ret	Ret	9	DNQ	12	Ret	14	Ret	14	14	Ret	Ret	19		3	9th
1991	Lotus 102B	Judd V8	G	(United Kingdom) Julian Bailey	DNQ	DNQ	6	DNQ														3	9th
1991	Lotus 102B	Judd V8	G	(United Kingdom) Johnny Herbert					DNQ	10	10	14^{†}			7		Ret		Ret	11		3	9th
1991	Lotus 102B	Judd V8	G	(Germany) Michael Bartels									DNQ	DNQ		DNQ		DNQ				3	9th
1992	Lotus 102D	Ford V8	G		RSA	MEX	BRA	ESP	SMR	MON	CAN	FRA	GBR	GER	HUN	BEL	ITA	POR	JPN	AUS		13	5th
1992	Lotus 102D	Ford V8	G	(Finland) Mika Häkkinen	9	6	10	Ret	DNQ													13	5th
1992	Lotus 102D	Ford V8	G	(United Kingdom) Johnny Herbert	6	7	Ret	Ret														13	5th
1992	Lotus 107	Ford V8	G	(United Kingdom) Johnny Herbert					Ret	Ret	Ret	6	Ret	Ret	Ret	13	Ret	Ret	Ret	13		13	5th
1992	Lotus 107	Ford V8	G	(Finland) Mika Häkkinen						Ret	Ret	4	6	Ret	4	6	Ret	5	Ret	7		13	5th
1993	Lotus 107B	Ford V8	G		RSA	BRA	EUR	SMR	ESP	MON	CAN	FRA	GBR	GER	HUN	BEL	ITA	POR	JPN	AUS		12	6th
1993	Lotus 107B	Ford V8	G	(United Kingdom) Johnny Herbert	Ret	4	4	8	Ret	Ret	10	Ret	4	10	Ret	5	Ret	Ret	11	Ret		12	6th
1993	Lotus 107B	Ford V8	G	(Italy) Alessandro Zanardi	Ret	6	8	Ret	14	7	11	Ret	Ret	Ret	Ret	DNQ						12	6th
1993	Lotus 107B	Ford V8	G	(Portugal) Pedro Lamy													11	Ret	13	Ret		12	6th
1994	Lotus 107C	Mugen-Honda V10	G		BRA	PAC	SMR	MON	ESP	CAN	FRA	GBR	GER	HUN	BEL	ITA	POR	EUR	JPN	AUS		0	NC
1994	Lotus 107C	Mugen-Honda V10	G	(Portugal) Pedro Lamy	10	8	Ret	11														0	NC
1994	Lotus 107C	Mugen-Honda V10	G	(Italy) Alessandro Zanardi					9	15												0	NC
1994	Lotus 107C	Mugen-Honda V10	G	(United Kingdom) Johnny Herbert	7	7	10	Ret														0	NC
1994	Lotus 109	Mugen-Honda V10	G	(United Kingdom) Johnny Herbert					Ret	8	7	11	Ret	Ret	12	Ret	13					0	NC
1994	Lotus 109	Mugen-Honda V10	G	(Italy) Alessandro Zanardi														16	13	Ret		0	NC
1994	Lotus 109	Mugen-Honda V10	G	(Italy) Alessandro Zanardi							Ret	Ret	Ret	13		Ret						0	NC
1994	Lotus 109	Mugen-Honda V10	G	(Belgium) Philippe Adams											Ret		16					0	NC
1994	Lotus 109	Mugen-Honda V10	G	(France) Éric Bernard														18				0	NC
1994	Lotus 109	Mugen-Honda V10	G	(Finland) Mika Salo															10	Ret		0	NC

Notes

- Includes points scored by non-works cars.
- † – The driver did not finish the Grand Prix, but was classified, as he completed over 90% of the race distance.
- ‡ – Half points awarded as less than 75% of the race distance was completed.

=== Results of other Lotus cars ===
(key)

Year	Entrant/s	Chassis/	Engine	Tyres	Driver/s	1	2	3	4	5	6	7	8	9	10	11	12	13	14	15	16
1958						ARG	MON	NED	500	BEL	FRA	GBR	GER	POR	ITA	MOR					
1958	Ecurie Demi Litre	16	Climax Straight-4	D	(United Kingdom) Ivor Bueb								11*								
1959						MON	500	NED	FRA	GBR	GER	POR	ITA	USA							
1959	John Fisher	16	Climax Straight-4	D	(United Kingdom) Bruce Halford	Ret															
1959	Dorchester Service Station	16	Climax Straight-4	D	(United Kingdom) David Piper					Ret*											
1959	Dennis Taylor	12	Climax Straight-4	D	(United Kingdom) Dennis Taylor					DNQ											
1960						ARG	MON	500	NED	BEL	FRA	GBR	POR	ITA	USA						
1960	Rob Walker Racing Team	18	Climax Straight-4	D	(United Kingdom) Stirling Moss		1^{P}		4^{P}^{F}	DNS			DSQ		1^{P}						
1960	Taylor-Crawley Racing Team	18	Climax Straight-4	D	(United Kingdom) Mike Taylor					DNS											
1960	Robert Bodle Ltd.	16	Climax Straight-4	D	(United Kingdom) David Piper						DNS	12									
1960	Jim Hall	18	Climax Straight-4	D	(United States) Jim Hall										7						
1961						MON	NED	BEL	FRA	GBR	GER	ITA	USA								
1961	Rob Walker Racing Team	18	Climax Straight-4	D	(United Kingdom) Stirling Moss	1^{P}^{F}	4														
1961	Rob Walker Racing Team	18/21	Climax Straight-4	D	(United Kingdom) Stirling Moss			8	Ret	Ret	1		Ret								
1961	Rob Walker Racing Team	21	Climax Straight-4	D	(United Kingdom) Stirling Moss							Ret									
1961	UDT-Laystall Racing Team	18/21	Climax Straight-4	D	(United Kingdom) Cliff Allison	8		DNS													
1961	UDT-Laystall Racing Team	18/21	Climax Straight-4	D	(United Kingdom) Henry Taylor	DNQ			10	Ret		11									
1961	UDT-Laystall Racing Team	18/21	Climax Straight-4	D	(Argentina) Juan Manuel Bordeu				DNS												
1961	UDT-Laystall Racing Team	18/21	Climax Straight-4	D	(United States) Masten Gregory							Ret	Ret								
1961	UDT-Laystall Racing Team	18/21	Climax Straight-4	D	(Belgium) Olivier Gendebien								11								
1961	UDT-Laystall Racing Team	18/21	Climax Straight-4	D	(Belgium) Lucien Bianchi				Ret	Ret											
1961	Equipe Nationale Belge	18	Climax Straight-4	D	(Belgium) Lucien Bianchi			Ret													
1961	Equipe Nationale Belge	18	Climax Straight-4	D	(Belgium) Willy Mairesse			Ret													
1961	Scuderia Colonia	18	Climax Straight-4	D	(Switzerland) Michael May	Ret			11		DNS										
1961	Scuderia Colonia	18	Climax Straight-4	D	(Germany) Wolfgang Seidel				DNS		17	Ret	Ret								
1961	Camoradi International	18	Climax Straight-4	D	(United Kingdom) Ian Burgess		DNS	DNS	14	14											
1961	Tony Marsh	18	Climax Straight-4	D	(United Kingdom) Tony Marsh			DNQ		Ret	15										
1961	Tim Parnell	18	Climax Straight-4	D	(United Kingdom) Tim Parnell					Ret		10									
1961	Gerry Ashmore	18	Climax Straight-4	D	(United Kingdom) Gerry Ashmore					Ret	16	Ret									
1961	Louise Bryden-Brown	18	Climax Straight-4	D	(South Africa) Tony Maggs					13	11										
1961	Prince Gaetano Starrabba	18	Maserati Straight-4	D	(Italy) Gaetano Starrabba							Ret									
1961	J Frank Harrison	18	Climax Straight-4	D	(United States) Lloyd Ruby								Ret								
1961	Jim Hall	18	Climax Straight-4	D	(United States) Jim Hall								Ret								
1961	J Wheeler Autosport	18/21	Climax Straight-4	D	(Canada) Peter Ryan								9								
1962						NED	MON	BEL	FRA	GBR	GER	ITA	USA	RSA							
1962	UDT-Laystall Racing Team	24	Climax Straight-4	D	(United Kingdom) Innes Ireland	Ret	Ret	Ret	Ret	16		Ret	8	5							
1962	UDT-Laystall Racing Team	18/21	Climax Straight-4	D	(United States) Masten Gregory	Ret															
1962	UDT-Laystall Racing Team	24	Climax Straight-4	D	(United States) Masten Gregory					7											
1962	UDT-Laystall Racing Team	24	BRM V8	D	(United States) Masten Gregory		DNQ	Ret	Ret			12	6								
1962	Brabham Racing Organisation	24	Climax V8	D	(Australia) Jack Brabham	Ret	8	6	Ret	5											
1962	Rob Walker Racing Team	24	Climax V8	D	(France) Maurice Trintignant		Ret	8	7		Ret	Ret	Ret								
1962	Scuderia Repubblica di Venezia	18/21	Climax Straight-4	D	(Italy) Nino Vaccarella		DNQ														
1962	Scuderia Repubblica di Venezia	24	Climax Straight-4	D	(Italy) Nino Vaccarella							9									
1962	Emeryson Cars	18	Climax Straight-4	D	(United Kingdom) John Campbell-Jones			11													
1962	Equipe Nationale Belge	18/21	Climax L4	D	(Belgium) Lucien Bianchi			9			16										
1962	Autosport Team Wolfgang Seidel	24	BRM V8	D	(United States) Dan Gurney			DNS													
1962	Autosport Team Wolfgang Seidel	24	BRM V8	D	(Germany) Wolfgang Seidel					Ret	DNQ										
1962	Autosport Team Wolfgang Seidel	24	BRM V8	D	(Germany) Günther Seiffert						DNQ										
1962	Ecurie Filipinetti	24	BRM V8	D	(Switzerland) Heinz Schiller						Ret										
1962	Ecurie Filipinetti	24	BRM V8	D	(Switzerland) Jo Siffert				Ret			DNQ									
1962	Ecurie Filipinetti	21	Climax Straight-4	D	(Switzerland) Jo Siffert			10			12										
1962	Ecurie Nationale Suisse	21	Climax Straight-4	D	(Switzerland) Jo Siffert		DNQ														
1962	Ecurie Excelsior	18	Climax Straight-4	D	(United States) Jay Chamberlain					15	DNQ	DNQ									
1962	John Dalton	18/21	Climax Straight-4	D	(New Zealand) Tony Shelly					Ret	DNQ										
1962	John Dalton	18/21	BRM V8	D	(New Zealand) Tony Shelly							DNQ									
1962	Gerry Ashmore	18/21	Climax Straight-4	D	(United Kingdom) Gerry Ashmore							DNQ									
1962	Scuderia Jolly Club	18	Climax Straight-4	D	(Italy) Ernesto Prinoth							DNQ									
1962	Dupont Team Zerex	24	Climax V8	D	(United States) Roger Penske								9								
1962	John Mecom	24	Climax Straight-4	D	(United States) Rob Schroeder								10								
1962	Jim Hall	21	Climax Straight-4	D	(United States) Jim Hall								DNS								
1962	Neville Lederle	21	Climax V8	D	(South Africa) Neville Lederle									6							
1962	Ernie Pieterse	21	Climax Straight-4	D	(South Africa) Ernie Pieterse									10							
1963						MON	BEL	NED	FRA	GBR	GER	ITA	USA	MEX	RSA						
1963	Siffert Racing Team	24	BRM V8	D	(Switzerland) Jo Siffert	Ret	Ret	7	6	Ret	9	Ret	Ret	9							
1963	British Racing Partnership	24	BRM V8	D	(United States) Jim Hall	Ret	Ret	8	11	6	5	8	10	8							
1963	British Racing Partnership	24	BRM V8	D	(United Kingdom) Innes Ireland	Ret					Ret										
1963	Bernard Collomb	24	Climax V8	D	(France) Bernard Collomb	DNQ					10										
1963	Brabham Racing Organisation	25	Climax V8	D	(Australia) Jack Brabham	9															
1963	Ecurie Filipinetti	24	BRM V8	D	(United States) Phil Hill				NC												
1963	Reg Parnell Racing	24	Climax V8; BRM V8	D	(United States) Masten Gregory				Ret	11		Ret									
1963	Reg Parnell Racing	24	Climax V8; BRM V8	D	(France) Maurice Trintignant				8												
1963	Reg Parnell Racing	24	Climax V8; BRM V8	D	(United Kingdom) Mike Hailwood					8											
1963	Reg Parnell Racing	24	Climax V8; BRM V8	D	(United States) Hap Sharp								Ret	7							
1963	Reg Parnell Racing	24	Climax V8; BRM V8	D	(United States) Rodger Ward								Ret								
1963	Reg Parnell Racing	24	Climax V8; BRM V8	D	(New Zealand) Chris Amon									Ret							
1963	Tim Parnell	18/21	Climax Straight-4	D	(United Kingdom) Tim Parnell						DNQ										
1963	Tim Parnell	18/21	Climax Straight-4	D	(Belgium) André Pilette						DNQ										
1963	Kurt Kuhnke	18	Borgward Straight-4	D	(Germany) Kurt Kuhnke						DNQ										
1963	Ted Lanfear	22	Ford Straight-4	D	(South Africa) Brausch Niemann										14						
1963	Lawson Organisation	21	Climax Straight-4	D	(South Africa) Ernie Pieterse										Ret						
1963	Selby Auto Spares	24	BRM V8	D	(South Africa) Paddy Driver										DNS						
1964						MON	NED	BEL	FRA	GBR	GER	AUT	ITA	USA	MEX						
1964	British Racing Partnership	24	BRM V8	D	(United Kingdom) Innes Ireland	DNS															
1964	British Racing Partnership	24	BRM V8	D	(United Kingdom) Trevor Taylor					Ret											
1964	Reg Parnell Racing	25	Climax V8; BRM V8	D	(United Kingdom) Mike Hailwood	6	12		8	Ret	Ret	8	Ret	8	16						
1964	Reg Parnell Racing	25	Climax V8; BRM V8	D	(New Zealand) Chris Amon	DNQ	5	Ret	10	Ret	11	Ret		Ret	Ret						
1964	Reg Parnell Racing	25	Climax V8; BRM V8	D	(United States) Peter Revson				DNS												
1964	Reg Parnell Racing	24	Climax V8; BRM V8	D	(United States) Peter Revson			DSQ		Ret											
1964	Revson Racing	24	BRM V8	D	(United States) Peter Revson	DNQ					14		13								
1964	Siffert Racing Team	24	BRM V8	D	(Switzerland) Jo Siffert	8															
1964	Bernard Collomb	24	Climax V8	D	(France) Bernard Collomb	DNQ															
1965						RSA	MON	BEL	FRA	GBR	NED	GER	ITA	USA	MEX						
1965	Reg Parnell Racing	25	BRM V8	D	(South Africa) Tony Maggs	11															
1965	Reg Parnell Racing	25	BRM V8	D	(United Kingdom) Richard Attwood		Ret	14		13	12	Ret	6	10	6						
1965	Reg Parnell Racing	25	BRM V8	D	(United Kingdom) Mike Hailwood		Ret														
1965	Reg Parnell Racing	25	BRM V8	D	(New Zealand) Chris Amon				Ret			Ret									
1965	Reg Parnell Racing	25	BRM V8	D	(United Kingdom) Innes Ireland			13	Ret	Ret	10										
1965	Reg Parnell Racing	33	BRM V8	D	(United Kingdom) Innes Ireland								9	Ret	DNS						
1965	Reg Parnell Racing	33	BRM V8	D	(United States) Bob Bondurant										Ret						
1965	Lawson Organisation	21	Climax Straight-4	D	(South Africa) Ernie Pieterse	DNQ															
1965	Scuderia Scribante	21	Climax Straight-4	D	(South Africa) Neville Lederle	DNQ															
1965	Ted Lanfear	22	Ford Straight-4	D	(South Africa) Brausch Niemann	DNQ															
1965	Clive Puzey	18/21	Climax Straight-4	D	(Rhodesia) Clive Puzey	DNPQ															
1965	Ecurie Tomahawk	20	Ford Straight-4	D	(South Africa) Dave Charlton	DNPQ															
1965	Brian Raubenheimer	20	Ford Straight-4	D	(South Africa) Brian Raubenheimer	WD															
1965	DW Racing Enterprises	33	Climax V8	D	(Australia) Paul Hawkins		10					Ret									
1965	Brian Gubby	24	Climax V8	D	(United Kingdom) Brian Gubby					DNQ											
1966						MON	BEL	FRA	GBR	NED	GER	ITA	USA	MEX							
1966	Reg Parnell Racing	33	BRM V8	F	(United Kingdom) Mike Spence	Ret	Ret	Ret	Ret	5	Ret	5	Ret	DNS							
1966	Phil Hill	25	Climax V8	F	(United States) Phil Hill	DNS															
1967						RSA	MON	NED	BEL	FRA	GBR	GER	CAN	ITA	USA	MEX					
1967	Reg Parnell Racing	25	BRM V8	F	(United Kingdom) Piers Courage	Ret															
1967	Reg Parnell Racing	25	BRM V8	F	(United Kingdom) Chris Irwin			7													
1967	Mike Fisher	33	BRM V8	F	(United States) Mike Fisher								11			DNS					
1968						RSA	ESP	MON	BEL	NED	FRA	GBR	GER	ITA	CAN	USA	MEX				
1968	Rob Walker Racing Team	49B	Ford Cosworth DFV	F	(Switzerland) Jo Siffert							1^{F}	Ret	Ret	Ret^{F}	5	6^{P}^{F}				
1968	Rob Walker Racing Team	49	Ford Cosworth DFV	F	(Switzerland) Jo Siffert		Ret	Ret	7	Ret	11										
1969						RSA	ESP	MON	NED	FRA	GBR	GER	ITA	CAN	USA	MEX					
1969	Rob Walker Racing Team	49B	Ford Cosworth DFV	F	(Switzerland) Jo Siffert	4	Ret	3	2	9	8	11	8	Ret	Ret	Ret					
1969	Team Gunston	49	Ford Cosworth DFV	D	(Rhodesia) John Love	Ret															
1969	Ecurie Bonnier	63	Ford Cosworth DFV	F	(Sweden) Jo Bonnier						Ret										
1969	Ecurie Bonnier	49B	Ford Cosworth DFV	F	(Sweden) Jo Bonnier							Ret									
1969	Pete Lovely Volkswagen Inc.	49B	Ford Cosworth DFV	F	(United States) Pete Lovely									7	Ret	9					
1969	Roy Winkelmann Racing	59B	Ford Cosworth FVA	F	(Germany) Rolf Stommelen							8*									
1969	Roy Winkelmann Racing	59B	Ford Cosworth FVA	F	(Germany) Hans Herrmann							DNS*									
1970						RSA	ESP	MON	BEL	NED	FRA	GBR	GER	AUT	ITA	CAN	USA	MEX			
1970	Brooke Bond Oxo Racing	49C	Ford Cosworth DFV	F	(United Kingdom) Graham Hill	6	4	5	Ret	NC	10	6	Ret								
1970	Brooke Bond Oxo Racing	72	Ford Cosworth DFV	F	(United Kingdom) Graham Hill										DNS	NC	Ret	Ret			
1970	Team Gunston	49	Ford Cosworth DFV	D	(Rhodesia) John Love	8															
1970	Scuderia Scribante	49C	Ford Cosworth DFV	F	(South Africa) Dave Charlton	12															
1970	Pete Lovely Volkswagen Inc.	49B	Ford Cosworth DFV	F	(United States) Pete Lovely					DNQ	DNQ	NC					DNQ				
1971						RSA	ESP	MON	NED	FRA	GBR	GER	AUT	ITA	CAN	USA					
1971	Pete Lovely Volkswagen Inc.	69	Ford Cosworth DFV	F	(United States) Pete Lovely										NC*	NC*					
1972						ARG	RSA	ESP	MON	BEL	FRA	GBR	GER	AUT	ITA	CAN	USA				
1972	Scribante Lucky Strike Racing	72D	Ford Cosworth DFV	F	(South Africa) Dave Charlton		Ret				DNQ	Ret	Ret								
1973						ARG	BRA	RSA	ESP	BEL	MON	SWE	FRA	GBR	NED	GER	AUT	ITA	CAN	USA	
1973	Scribante Lucky Strike Racing	72D	Ford Cosworth DFV	G	(South Africa) Dave Charlton			Ret													
1974						ARG	BRA	RSA	ESP	BEL	MON	SWE	NED	FRA	GBR	GER	AUT	ITA	CAN	USA	
1974	Team Gunston	72E	Ford Cosworth DFV	F	(South Africa) Paddy Driver			Ret													
1974	Team Gunston	72E	Ford Cosworth DFV	F	(South Africa) Ian Scheckter			13													
1975						ARG	BRA	RSA	ESP	MON	BEL	SWE	NED	FRA	GBR	GER	AUT	ITA	USA		
1975	Team Gunston	72D	Ford Cosworth DFV	G	(South Africa) Guy Tunmer			11													
1975	Team Gunston	72D	Ford Cosworth DFV	G	(South Africa) Eddie Keizan			13													
1978						ARG	BRA	RSA	USW	MON	BEL	ESP	SWE	FRA	GBR	GER	AUT	NED	ITA	USA	CAN
1978	Team Rebaque	78	Ford Cosworth DFV	G	(Mexico) Héctor Rebaque	DNQ	Ret	10	DNPQ	DNPQ	DNPQ	Ret	12	DNQ	Ret	6	Ret	11	DNQ	Ret	DNQ
1979						ARG	BRA	RSA	USW	ESP	BEL	MON	FRA	GBR	GER	AUT	NED	ITA	CAN	USA	
1979	Team Rebaque	79	Ford Cosworth DFV	G	(Mexico) Héctor Rebaque	Ret	DNQ	Ret	Ret	Ret	Ret		12	9	Ret	DNQ	7				

* Asterisk indicates a race entered with an F2 car
