= Rob Schroeder =

American racing driver (1926–2011)

Robert 'Rob' Schroeder
- Born: May 11, 1926; El Dorado, Arkansas, U.S.
- Died: December 3, 2011 (aged 85); Dallas, Texas, U.S.

Formula One World Championship career
- Nationality: (United States) American
- Active years: 1962
- Team: non-works Lotus
- Entries: 1
- Championships: 0
- Wins: 0
- Podiums: 0
- Career points: 0
- Pole positions: 0
- Fastest laps: 0
- First entry: 1962 United States Grand Prix

Robert Edward Schroeder (May 11, 1926 − December 3, 2011) was a racing driver from the United States, born in El Dorado. He lived in Medina, Wisconsin and participated in one Formula One World Championship Grand Prix, the 1962 United States Grand Prix, on October 7, 1962. He finished tenth, seven laps behind race winner Jim Clark, and scored no championship points. He died after suffering from a short period of ill-health and heart problems in a Dallas hospital in 2011.

== Complete Formula One World Championship results ==
(key)

Year	Entrant	Chassis	Engine	1	2	3	4	5	6	7	8	9	WDC	Points
1962	John Mecom	Lotus 24	Climax V8	NED	MON	BEL	FRA	GBR	GER	ITA	USA; 10	RSA	NC	0
