= Lotus 24 =

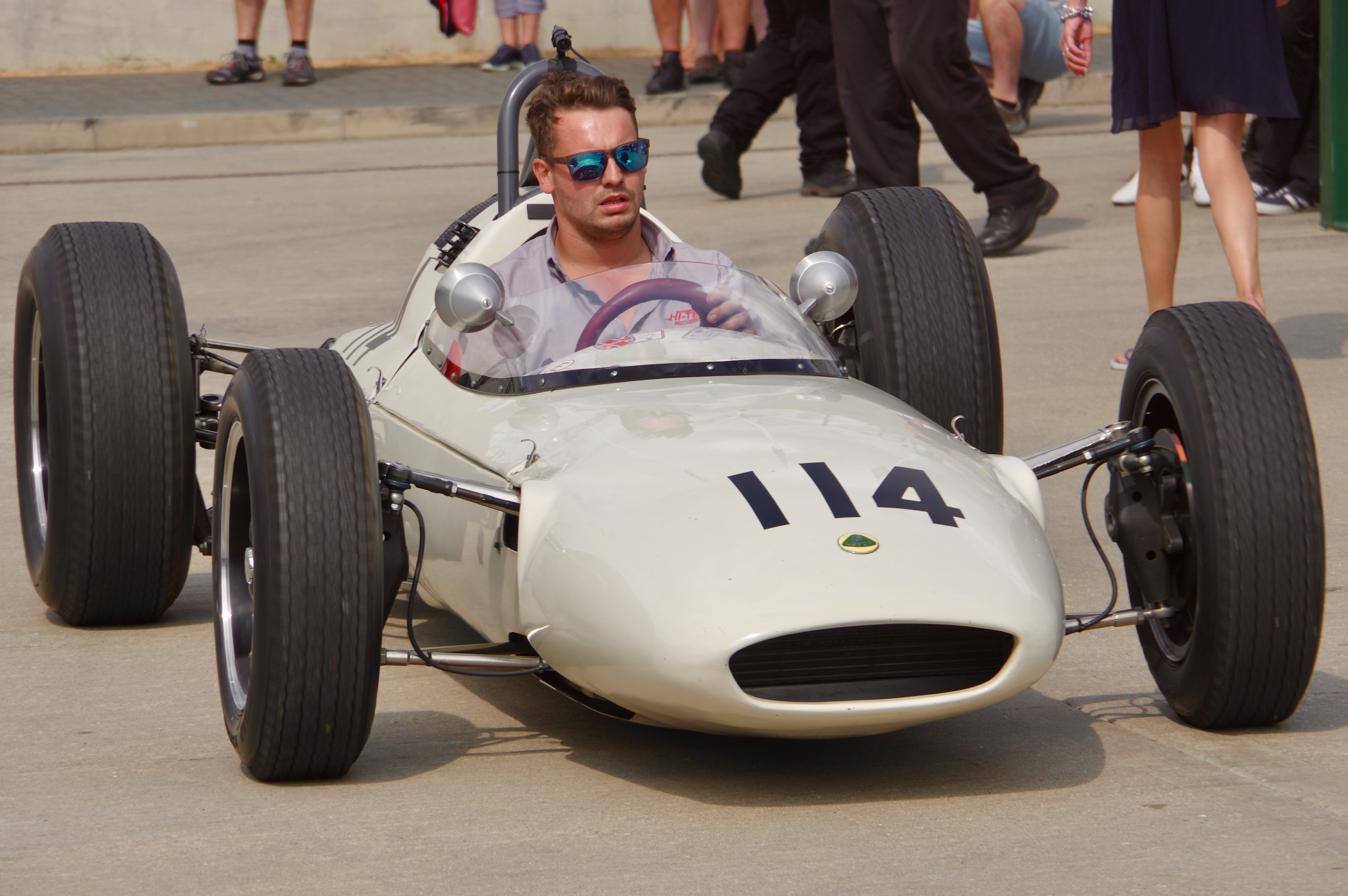
- Lotus 24 BRM at the Silverstone Classic in 2018.
- Category: Formula One
- Constructor: Team Lotus
- Designer(s): Colin Chapman
- Predecessor: 21
- Successor: 25

Technical specifications
- Chassis: Steel spaceframe
- Suspension (front): Double wishbone, with inboard coilover spring/damper units.
- Suspension (rear): Lower wishbone, top link and radius rod suspension, with outboard coilover spring/damper units.
- Engine: Coventry Climax FWMV, 1496cc, 90° V8; BRM P56, 1498 cc, 90° V8; Naturally aspirated mid-mounted
- Transmission: ZF 5DS10 5-speed manual
- Tyres: Dunlop

Competition history
- Notable entrants: Team Lotus; Brabham Racing Organisation; UDT Laystall Racing Team; Siffert Racing Team
- Notable drivers: (United Kingdom) Trevor Taylor (France) Maurice Trintignant (New Zealand) Chris Amon (United Kingdom) Innes Ireland (United States) Masten Gregory (United States) Roger Penske
- Debut: 1962 Dutch Grand Prix
Races	Wins	Podiums	Poles	F/Laps
49	0	1	0	0
- Constructors' Championships: 0
- Drivers' Championships: 0
- n.b. Unless otherwise stated, all data refer to Formula One World Championship Grands Prix only.

Lotus 24 at Goodwood Festival of Speed 2010

The Lotus 24 was a Formula One racing car designed by Team Lotus for the 1962 Formula One season. Despite some early success in non-Championship Grands Prix, it was eclipsed by the technically superior Lotus 25 and rarely featured in the points in World Championship races.

== Concept ==
Having devised the monocoque Lotus 25 for use by the works team, Colin Chapman decided to build a 'conventional' back-up spaceframe design which he would also sell to privateers. The 24 was a completely different design from its predecessor, the 21, and used much of the same suspension as the 25. Both Coventry Climax FWMV and BRM P56 engines were generally fitted, with at least one example running with the Coventry Climax FPF four-cylinder.

== Racing history ==
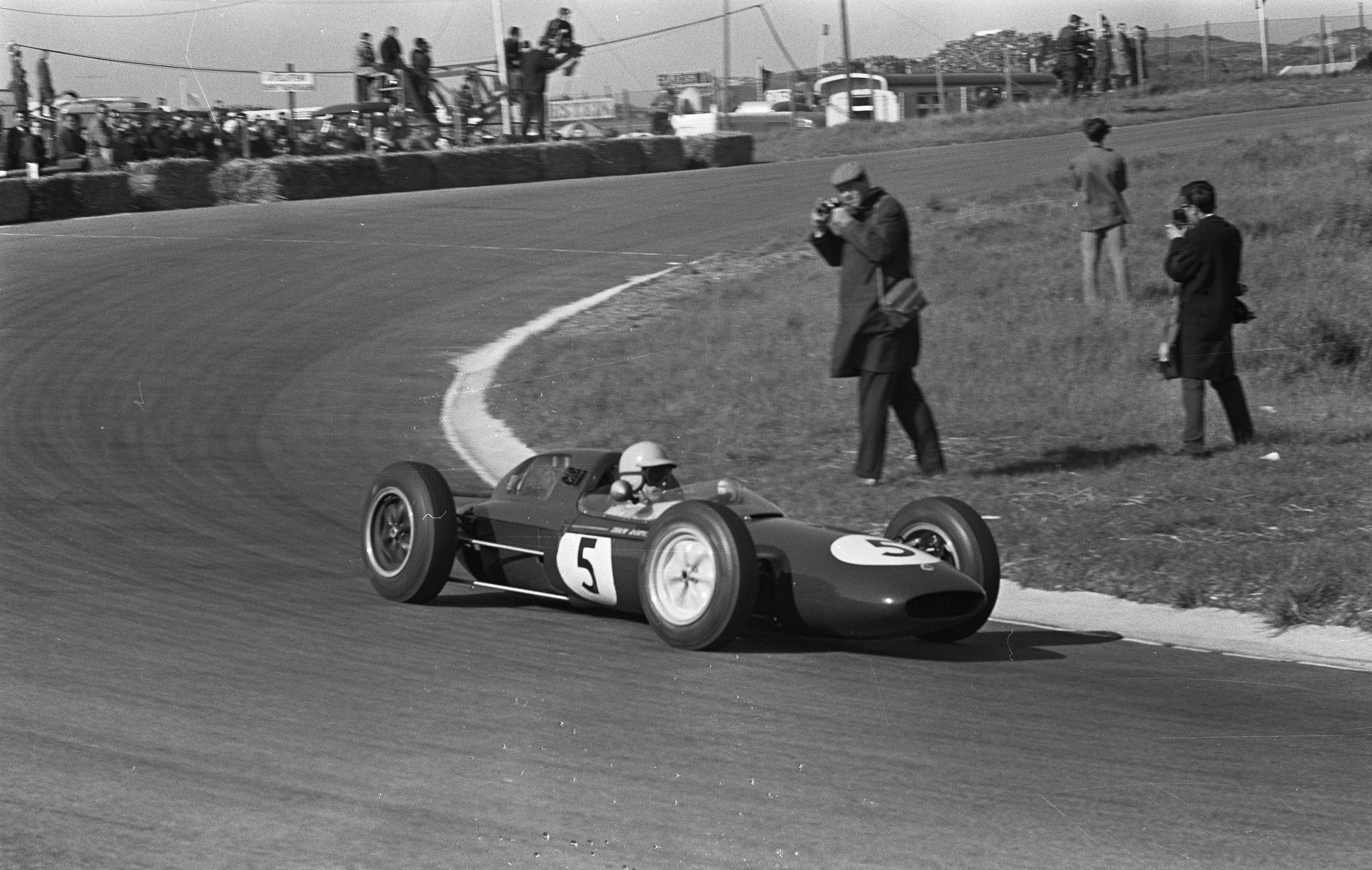
Trevor Taylor at the 1962 Dutch Grand Prix.

The Lotus 24 made its debut at the 1962 Brussels Grand Prix. Jim Clark put it in pole position for the first heat, but retired after only one lap. Two weeks later Clark won the Lombank Trophy race at Snetterton. Its first World Championship event was the 1962 Dutch Grand Prix, where it finished second with Trevor Taylor. However, that would be its best Championship finish; the Lotus 25 had arrived on the scene and was obviously the way ahead, much to the chagrin of those who had paid good money for their 24. Colin Chapman had promised his customers that the team cars would be mechanically identical to the customer cars, leaving himself free to alter what he classified as the cars' "bodywork".

The 24 continued to be run by private teams in 1963 and 1964 with limited success, and by 1965 only one World Championship entry was made, Brian Gubby failing to qualify for the British Grand Prix.

=== World Championship results ===
(key) (results in bold indicate pole position; results in italics indicate fastest lap)

Year	Entrant	Engine	Driver	1	2	3	4	5	6	7	8	9	10	Points (Note: Points were awarded on a 9-6-4-3-2-1 basis to the first six finishers at each round, but only the best placed car for each make was eligible to score points. In 1962 only the best five results from the season were retained, and only the best six results for 1963, 1964 and 1965.)	WCC
1962	Team Lotus	Climax V8		NED	MON	BEL	FRA	GBR	GER	ITA	USA	RSA		**36 (38)**	2nd
1962	Team Lotus	Climax V8	Trevor Taylor	2	Ret	Ret		8	Ret					**36 (38)**	2nd
1962	Brabham Racing Organisation	Climax V8	Jack Brabham	Ret	8	6	Ret	5						**36 (38)**	2nd
1962	R.R.C. Walker Racing Team	Climax V8	Maurice Trintignant	WD	Ret	8	7	WD	Ret	Ret	Ret			**36 (38)**	2nd
1962	Dupont Team Zerex	Climax V8	Roger Penske								9			**36 (38)**	2nd
1962	John Mecom	Climax L4	Rob Schroeder								10			**36 (38)**	2nd
1962	Scuderia SSS Republica di Venezia	Climax L4	Nino Vacarella							Ret				**36 (38)**	2nd
1962	UDT Laystall Racing Team	Climax V8	Innes Ireland	Ret	Ret	Ret	Ret	16		Ret	8	5		**36 (38)**	2nd
1962	UDT Laystall Racing Team	Climax V8	Masten Gregory					7						**36 (38)**	2nd
1962	UDT Laystall Racing Team	BRM V8	Masten Gregory				7				6			**1** (Note: Total points scored by all Lotus-BRM cars, including points scored by drivers of Lotus 25 and Lotus 33 variants.)	8th
1962	Autosport Team Wolfgang Seidel	BRM V8	Dan Gurney			DNS								**1**	8th
1962	Autosport Team Wolfgang Seidel	BRM V8	Wolfgang Seidel					Ret	DNQ					**1**	8th
1962	Autosport Team Wolfgang Seidel	BRM V8	Tony Shelly							DNQ				**1**	8th
1962	Autosport Team Wolfgang Seidel	BRM V8	Günther Seiffert						DNQ					**1**	8th
1962	Ecurie Filipinetti	BRM V8	Jo Siffert				Ret			DNQ				**1**	8th
1962	Ecurie Filipinetti	BRM V8	Heinz Schiller						Ret					**1**	8th
1963	British Racing Partnership	Climax V8		MON	BEL	NED	FRA	GBR	GER	ITA	USA	MEX	RSA	**54 (74)** (Note: Total points scored by all Lotus-Climax cars, including points scored by drivers of Lotus 25 and Lotus 33 variants.)	1st
1963	British Racing Partnership	Climax V8	Innes Ireland	Ret					Ret					**54 (74)**	1st
1963	Bernard Collomb	Climax V8	Bernard Collomb	DNQ					10					**54 (74)**	1st
1963	Reg Parnell Racing	Climax V8	Maurice Trintignant				8							**54 (74)**	1st
1963	Reg Parnell Racing	Climax V8	Mike Hailwood					8						**54 (74)**	1st
1963	Reg Parnell Racing	BRM V8	Hap Sharp								Ret	7		**4**	8th
1963	Reg Parnell Racing	BRM V8	Roger Ward								Ret			**4**	8th
1963	Reg Parnell Racing	BRM V8	Chris Amon									Ret		**4**	8th
1963	Reg Parnell Racing	BRM V8	Masten Gregory					11						**4**	8th
1963	Tim Parnell	BRM V8	Masten Gregory				Ret			Ret				**4**	8th
1963	Ecurie Filipinetti	BRM V8	Phil Hill				NC							**4**	8th
1963	British Racing Partnership	BRM V8	Jim Hall	Ret	Ret	8	11	6	5	8	10	8		**4**	8th
1963	Siffert Racing Team	BRM V8	Jo Siffert	Ret	Ret	7	6	Ret	9	Ret	Ret	9		**4**	8th
1963	Selby Auto Spares	BRM V8	Paddy Driver										DNS	**4**	8th
1964	Bernard Collomb	Climax V8		MON	NED	BEL	FRA	GBR	GER	AUT	ITA	USA	MEX	**37 (40)**	3rd
1964	Bernard Collomb	Climax V8	Bernard Collomb	DNQ										**37 (40)**	3rd
1964	Siffert Racing Team	BRM V8	Jo Siffert	8										**3**	8th
1964	British Racing Partnership	BRM V8	Innes Ireland	DNS										**3**	8th
1964	British Racing Partnership	BRM V8	Trevor Taylor					Ret						**3**	8th
1964	Reg Parnell Racing	BRM V8	Peter Revson			DSQ		Ret						**3**	8th
1964	Revson Racing	BRM V8	Peter Revson	DNQ					14		13			**3**	8th
1965	Brian Gubby	Climax V8		RSA	MON	BEL	FRA	GBR	NED	GER	ITA	USA	MEX	**54 (58)**	1st
1965	Brian Gubby	Climax V8	Brian Gubby					DNQ						**54 (58)**	1st

== Bibliography ==
- Whitelock, Mark (2006). 1½-litre Grand Prix Racing 1961-1965. Veloce Publishing Ltd. ISBN 184584016X.
