= Heini Walter =

Swiss racing driver (1927–2009)

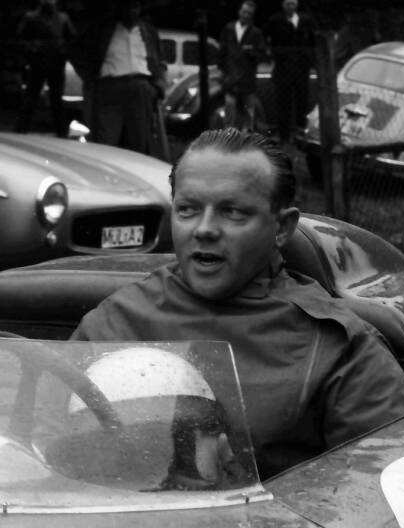
- Born: 28 July 1927; Alpthal, Switzerland
- Died: 12 May 2009 (aged 81); Aesch, Basel-Country, Switzerland

Formula One World Championship career
- Nationality: (Switzerland) Swiss
- Active years: 1962
- Team: non-works Porsche
- Entries: 1
- Championships: 0
- Wins: 0
- Podiums: 0
- Career points: 0
- Pole positions: 0
- Fastest laps: 0
- First entry: 1962 German Grand Prix

Heinrich "Heini" Walter (28 July 1927 – 12 May 2009) was a Swiss racing driver. He participated in one Formula One World Championship Grand Prix, on 5 August 1962. He finished 14th, scoring no World Championship points. He also participated in non-Championship Formula One races.

== Complete Formula One World Championship results ==
(key)

| Year | Entrant | Chassis | Engine | 1 | 2 | 3 | 4 | 5 | 6 | 7 | 8 | 9 | WDC | Points |
|---|---|---|---|---|---|---|---|---|---|---|---|---|---|---|
| 1962 | Ecurie Filipinetti | Porsche 718 | Porsche Flat-4 | NED | MON | BEL | FRA | GBR | GER; 14 | ITA | USA | RSA | NC | 0 |
