= Mecom Racing Team =

American auto racing team active 1960-1967

The Mecom Racing Team was led by John Mecom Jr. and was active between 1960 and 1967 in the World Sportscar Championship racing, Formula One, and American Championship Car Racing scenes. The Mecom Racing Team and later the Mecom Group were led by John Mecom Jr.

John Mecom Jr. was known to have as many as seven different marques not only at the same event but in the same race. In the early 1960s the Mecom Racing Team had great success in the Bahamas Speed Weeks. Roger Penske, driving for Mecom in the early years, won in the Bahamas as well as the 12 Hours of Sebring in a Ferrari GTO with Augie Pabst Jr. The Grand Sport Corvettes were also campaigned by Mecom with tremendous results.

The Mecom Group managed ex-Moto GP Champion Kevin Schwantz from bikes and into cars and team ownership. In 1966 Graham Hill won the Indianapolis 500 while driving for John Mecom Jr. and the Mecom Team in their Lola-Ford. The team also fielded a car for George Follmer in the 1966 Can-Am season.

John Mecom Jr. backed Danica Patrick in her transition from a 15-year-old kart racer to be a professional racing car driver in 1998, by providing full financial support and securing drives for her to race in England with help of long-time family friend and former Mecom team driver Jackie Stewart. This led to her subsequent involvement with Ford and then Rahal Letterman Racing.

== Complete Formula One World Championship results ==
(key)

Year	Chassis	Engine	Tyres	Drivers	1	2	3	4	5	6	7	8	9
1962	Lotus 24	Climax FPF 1.5 L4	D		NED	MON	BEL	FRA	GBR	GER	ITA	USA	RSA
1962	Lotus 24	Climax FPF 1.5 L4	D	(United States) Rob Schroeder								10	
