= Gubby =

Gubby is both a given name and a surname. Notable people with the name include:

- Brian Gubby (born 1934), British former racing driver
- Gubby Allen (1902–1989), Australian-born English cricketer
- Bobby G (real name Robert Alan Gubby), English singer best known as member of the band Bucks Fizz
