= Jackie Lewis =

British racing driver (born 1936)

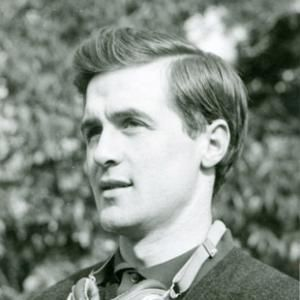
- Jackie Lewis in 1961
- Born: 1 November 1936 (age 90); Stroud, Gloucestershire, England

Formula One World Championship career
- Nationality: (United Kingdom) British
- Active years: 1961 – 1962
- Team(s): non-works Cooper, non-works BRM
- Entries: 10 (9 starts)
- Championships: 0
- Wins: 0
- Podiums: 0
- Career points: 3
- Pole positions: 0
- Fastest laps: 0
- First entry: 1961 Belgian Grand Prix
- Last entry: 1962 German Grand Prix

Jack Rex Lewis (born 1 November 1936) is a British former racing driver, born in Stroud, Gloucestershire.

== Career ==
Lewis' racing career began in Formula Three. In 1958 Lewis bought a Formula Three Cooper-Norton from Cheltenham based Ivor Bueb and made his debut at Mallory Park, remarkably coming fourth. At Brands Hatch he made front page news for surviving a crash - a lucky photographer captured Jack’s upside-down Cooper showing Jack’s hand appearing to hold the car up. Just a week later he came first at Full Sutton and then won again at Oulton Park. In his first season in Formula 3 he raced 13 times - he won three of his races and was on the podium for a further four.

A year later, in a Formula Two Cooper-Climax, Lewis won his first F2 race at Paris Montlhéry – winning by over two minutes. The following year Lewis' determination paid off and he took the F2 champion title – ahead of Australian World Champion Jack Brabham.

The following year, Lewis tried his hand at Formula One and purchased a Cooper T53 from the Surbiton factory. He made his Grand Prix debut at the Belgian Grand Prix in Spa in June 1961. His maiden season showed much promise – qualifying often mid-grid and finishing ninth in his first ever race and at the Nürburgring. He achieved fourth in Italy.

Aside from Stirling Moss, Lewis was the only independent driver to score any points in 1961 and was listed as a Grade A driver for the following year.

In 1962, Lewis formed the Ecurie Galloise (Welsh Racing Team) sponsored by the Western Sporting Press and his father's business H&L Motors of Stroud - of which Lewis was now also a director. He bought a 1961/62 BRM V8 to race, but the car was unsatisfactory and eventually went back to the factory. He had no option but to return to his Cooper which he used the previous season. Although he achieved seventh place at the Dutch Grand Prix, it was overall a disappointing season for Lewis. The politics of F1 were beginning to affect him – he had been quicker than three works drivers at Monaco, yet had been denied a starting slot by the organisers. Lewis survived a few dangerous moments – losing a wheel at speed at Oulton Park and ramming Graham Hill in the French Grand Prix. He participated in 10 Formula One World Championship Grands Prix in all, scoring a total of three championship points.

By 1963, feeling despondent, Lewis retired from a promising racing career and took on a farm in Llandovery, Carmarthenshire where he bred Arab horses, and raised two daughters. After 18 years as a sheep farmer, in 1981, Lewis returned to Gloucestershire to help his father run H&L Motors, a motorcycle business. In 1988 he fathered a son, Jack Lewis Jnr, and currently lives in his town of birth, Stroud, Gloucestershire.

== Complete Formula One World Championship results ==
(key)

Year	Entrant	Chassis	Engine	1	2	3	4	5	6	7	8	9	WDC	Points
1961	H&L Motors	Cooper T53	Climax Straight-4	MON	NED	BEL; 9	FRA; Ret	GBR; Ret	GER; 9	ITA; 4	USA		14th	3
1962	Ecurie Galloise	Cooper T53	Climax Straight-4	NED; 8		BEL	FRA; Ret	GBR; 10	GER; Ret	ITA	USA	RSA	NC	0
1962	Ecurie Galloise	BRM P48/57	BRM V8		MON; DNQ								NC	0
