= Günther Seiffert =

German racing driver (1937–2020)

- Born: 18 October 1937; Oldenburg, Germany
- Died: 11 November 2020 (aged 83)

Formula One World Championship career
- Nationality: (Germany) German
- Active years: 1962
- Team: non-works Lotus
- Entries: 1 (0 starts)
- Championships: 0
- Wins: 0
- Podiums: 0
- Career points: 0
- Pole positions: 0
- Fastest laps: 0
- First entry: 1962 German Grand Prix

Günther Seiffert (18 October 1937 – 11 November 2020) was a German racing driver. He made one attempt at a World Championship Formula One event, entering the 1962 German Grand Prix with a Lotus run by Wolfgang Seidel's team. The car was shared with Seidel himself, but they failed to qualify it.

Seiffert also participated in several non-Championship Formula One races during 1962–63, mostly for Seidel's team. He generally qualified at the back of the grid, and when he finished races, it was usually also at the back of the field. He drew attention to himself at the 1962 Lavant Cup when he collided with John Surtees while being lapped very early in the race, but his best showing was in his last Formula One event, where he finished seventh, albeit 12 laps down, at the 1963 Austrian Grand Prix.

After his racing career, Seiffert became a classic car dealer, also selling car accessories and slot car racing equipment.

Seiffert died on 11 November 2020, at the age of 83.

== Complete Formula One World Championship results ==
(key)

Year	Entrant	Chassis	Engine	1	2	3	4	5	6	7	8	9	10	WDC	Points
1962	Autosport Team Wolfgang Seidel	Lotus 24	BRM V8	NED	MON	BEL	FRA	GBR	GER; DNQ	ITA	USA	RSA		NC	0
1963	Rhine-Ruhr Racing Team	Lotus 24	BRM V8	MON	BEL	NED	FRA	GBR	GER	ITA; DNA	USA	MEX	RSA	NC	0

=== Non-Championship ===
(key)

Year	Entrant	Chassis	Engine	1	2	3	4	5	6	7	8	9	10	11	12	13	14	15	16	17	18	19	20
1962	Autosport Team Wolfgang Seidel	Lotus 18	Climax Straight-4	CAP	BRX	LOM	LAV; Ret	GLV; WD	PAU	AIN; 12	INT	NAP; DNQ	MAL	CLP; Ret	RMS	SOL; NC	KAN	MED; 9	DAN	OUL; 10	MEX	RAN	NAT
1963	Autosport Team Wolfgang Seidel	Lotus 24	BRM V8	LOM	GLV; DNA	PAU	IMO; DNQ	SYR; Ret	AIN	INT													
1963	Rhine-Ruhr Racing Team	Lotus 24	BRM V8								ROM; 10	SOL; NC	KAN	MED	AUT; 7	OUL	RAN						
