= Goldene Peitsche =

- Class: Group 2
- Location: Iffezheim Racecourse; Baden-Baden, Germany
- Inaugurated: 1867
- Race type: Flat / Thoroughbred
- Website: Baden-Baden

Race information
- Distance: 1,200 metres (6f)
- Surface: Turf
- Track: Left-handed
- Qualification: Three-years-old and up
- Weight: 57½ kg (3yo); 59 kg (4yo+); Allowances; 1½ kg for fillies and mares
- Purse: €70,000 (2012); 1st: €40,000

The Goldene Peitsche is a Group 3 flat horse race in Germany open to thoroughbreds aged three years or older. It is run at Baden-Baden over a distance of 1,200 metres (about 6 furlongs), and it is scheduled to take place each year in late August or early September.

== History ==
The event was established in 1867, and the inaugural running was won by Cobweb. It was initially held at Tempelhof, and was transferred to Hoppegarten in 1868.

The race was switched to Grunewald in 1918, and it returned to Hoppegarten in 1923. It was not run from 1945 to 1947, and for brief spells thereafter it was staged at Cologne (1948) and Mülheim (1949, 1950 and 1952).

The Goldene Peitsche moved to Baden-Baden in 1953. It was given Group 3 status in 1973, and was promoted to Group 2 level in 1991. It was downgraded to Group 3 in 2014 only. But returned Group 2 in 2015, during Sprint Races programme update. In August 2018, Raven's Lady from England won the 148th Casino Baden-Baden Golden Whip.

== Records ==
Most successful horse (3 wins):

- Altgold – 1899, 1900, 1901
- Oberwinter – 1927, 1928, 1929

Leading jockey (7 wins):

- Egbert Fisk – Johannes (1868), Reform (1869), Das Veilchen (1871), Sonntag (1873), Templer (1876), Schmetterling (1878), Valerius (1882)

Leading trainer (8 wins):

- Adrian von Borcke – Laotse (1933), Dardanos (1936), Florida (1939), Figaro (1942), Ticino (1944), Atatürk (1955), Fallott (1957), Niobe (1958)

(note: the trainers of some of the early winners are unknown)

== Winners since 1965 ==
Year	Winner	Age	Jockey	Trainer	Time
1965	Sleipnir	4	Gerhard Streit	Hans Blume, Sr.	1:14.10
1966	Wirbel	5	Johannes Starosta	Hans Blume, Sr.	1:17.70
1967	Pentathlon	3	Fritz Drechsler	H. Danner	1:13.30
1968	Rosetta	3	Albert Klimscha, Jr.	Albert Klimscha	1:12.30
1969	Pentathlon	5	Harro Remmert	H. Danner	1:14.90
1970	Gerona	3	Uwe Mathony	H. Danner	1:10.30
1971	Fireside Chat	3	Peter Madden	Doug Marks	1:12.30
1972	Rubens	3	Uwe Mathony	H. Danner	1:12.10
1973	Garzer	4	Peter Alafi	Anton Pohlkötter	1:10.30
1974	Flintham	5	Mick Goreham	Denys Smith	1:13.70
1975	Steel Heart	3	Johnny Roe	Dermot Weld	1:14.80
1976	Kronenkranich	4	Jerzy Jednaszewski	Theo Grieper	1:12.30
1977	Balboa	3	Alfred Haydn	A. Leidenfrost	1:09.80
1978	Cagliostro	4	José Orihuel	Hein Bollow	1:11.80
1979	Iron Ruler	4	Michel Jerome	C. de Watrigant	1:11.20
1980	Song of Songs	6	Otto Gervai	L. Jarven	1:10.60
1981	Rabdan	4	Lester Piggott	Robert Armstrong	1:09.30
1982	Tina's Pet	4	Mick Miller	Geoff Huffer	1:10.30
1983	Gabitat	5	Bob Curant	Brian Gubby	1:10.10
1984	Celestial Dancer	5	Edward Hide	Tony Hide	1:11.60
1985	Gabitat	7	Paul Cook	Brian Gubby	1:09.90
1986	Premiere Cuvee	4	Guy Guignard	Jonathan Pease	1:10.60
1987	Simon Sacc	5	Ole Larsen	Lone Larsen	1:10.40
1988	Astronef	4	Alain Lequeux	Robert Collet	1:11.10
1989	Astronef	5	Eric Saint-Martin	Robert Collet	1:10.93
1990	Flower Girl	3	Richard Hills	Harry Thomson Jones	1:10.02
1991	Nicholas	5	Lester Piggott	Susan Piggott	1:09.20
1992	Elbio	5	John Reid	Peter Makin	1:12.99
1993	Robin des Pins	5	Cash Asmussen	François Boutin	1:08.55
1994	Munaaji	3	Walter Swinburn	Andreas Wöhler	1:09.89
1995	Hever Golf Rose	4	Jason Weaver	Joe Naughton	1:10.64
1996	Daring Destiny	5	Richard Hughes	Karl Burke	1:10.21
1997	Don't Worry Me	5	Gérald Mossé	Guy Henrot	1:09.65
1998	Areion (Note: Averti finished first in 1998, but he was relegated to third place following a stewards' inquiry)	3	Andreas Boschert	Andreas Wöhler	1:08.66
1999	Keos	5	Thierry Jarnet	John Hammond	1:08.97
2000	Barrow Creek	6	Terence Hellier	Peter Schiergen	1:09.40
2001	Vision of Night	5	Pat Eddery	John Dunlop	1:08.34
2002	Nobel Prize	6	Rodrigo Blanco	Diego Lowther	1:11.27
2003	Stormont	3	Torsten Mundry	Hugh Collingridge	1:08.12
2004	Raffelberger	3	Andreas Suborics	Mario Hofer	1:09.47
2005	Striking Ambition (Note: Lucky Strike was first in 2005, but he was placed second after a stewards' inquiry)	5	Steve Drowne	Roger Charlton	1:07.94
2006	Linngari	4	Andreas Suborics	Diego Lowther	1:11.76
2007	Electric Beat	4	Torsten Mundry	Christian Sprengel	1:09.04
2008	Overdose	3	Andreas Suborics	Sandor Ribarszki	1:08.21
2009	War Artist	6	Andreas Suborics	James Eustace	1:08.06
2010	Amico Fritz	4	Fabrice Veron	Henri-Alex Pantall	1:11.38
2011	Silverside	5	Julien Grosjean	Frédéric Sanchez	1:09.61
2012	Ferro Sensation	6	Mirco Demuro	Jan Pubben	1:10.92
2013	Giant Sandman	6	Lennart Hammer-Hansen	Rune Haugen	1:09.22
2014	Signs of Blessing	3	Stéphane Pasquier	François Rohaut	1:13.91
2015	Shining Emerald	4	Eduardo Pedroza	Andrea Wohler	1:09.19
2016	Donnerschlag	6	Marc Lerner	Jean-Pierre Carvalho	1:09.43
2017	Son Cesio	6	Adrie de Vries	Henri-Alex Pantall	1:07.76
2018	Raven's Lady	4	Gérald Mossé	Marco Botti	1:08.37
2019	Royal Intervention	4	Gérald Mossé	Ed Walker	1:08.49
2020	Namos	4	Wladimir Panov	Dominik Moser	1:07.54
2021	Kitty Marion	5	Vaclav Janacek	Guillermo Arizkorreta Elosegui	1:09.05
2022	Dubawi Legend	3	Ross Coakley	Hugo Palmer	1:09.70
2023	Zerostress	7	Hugo Besnier	Sascha Smrczek	1:10.64
2024	Al Shabab Storm	3	Jason Watson	Andrew Balding	1:09.14
2025	The Strikin Viking	3	Faleh Bughenaim	Hamad Al Jehani	1:08.63
2026	Holguin	6	Faleh Bughenaim	Hamad Al Jehani	1:09.75

== Earlier winners ==
- 1867: Cobweb
- 1868: Johannes
- 1869: Reform
- 1870: Ghuznee
- 1871: Das Veilchen
- 1872: Flibustier
- 1873: Sonntag
- 1874: Lulu
- 1875: Lulu
- 1876: Templer
- 1877: Recorder
- 1878: Schmetterling
- 1879: Picklock
- 1880: Donnerkeil
- 1881: Consul
- 1882: Valerius
- 1883: Glocke
- 1884: Weltmann
- 1885: Amorosa
- 1886: Triftig
- 1887: C-Dur
- 1888: Blücher
- 1889: Orcan
- 1890: Dalberg
- 1891: Dalberg
- 1892: Orcan
- 1893: Königswinter
- 1894: Milchmann
- 1895: Ausmärker
- 1896: Undolf
- 1897: Jenny Lind
- 1898: Goldregen
- 1899: Altgold
- 1900: Altgold
- 1901: Altgold
- 1902: Bärenhäuter
- 1903: Saskia
- 1904: Monopol
- 1905: Holländer
- 1906: Olaf
- 1907: Holländer
- 1908: Fabula
- 1909: Faust
- 1910: Abendluft
- 1911: Fervor
- 1912: Flagge
- 1913: Lena
- 1914: Festtarok
- 1915: Grandezza
- 1916: Ladylove
- 1917: Blätterteig
- 1918: Blätterteig
- 1919: Optimist
- 1920: Kolmerhof
- 1921: Wallenstein
- 1922: Sardanapal
- 1923: Ischida
- 1924: Bafur
- 1925: Sinir
- 1926: Grossinquisitor
- 1927: Oberwinter
- 1928: Oberwinter
- 1929: Oberwinter
- 1930: Rochus
- 1931: Napoleon
- 1932: Rochus
- 1933: Laotse
- 1934: Janitor
- 1935: Janitor
- 1936: Dardanos
- 1937: Feurige
- 1938: Gela
- 1939: Florida
- 1940: Kumbuke
- 1941: Rexow
- 1942: Figaro
- 1943: Caramelle
- 1944: Ticino
- 1945–47: no race
- 1948: Nachtfalke
- 1949: Honved
- 1950: Antonius
- 1951: no race
- 1952: Antonius
- 1953: Liebesmahl
- 1954: Baal
- 1955: Atatürk
- 1956: Liebeslied
- 1957: Fallott
- 1958: Niobe
- 1959: Wettcoup
- 1960: Adlon
- 1961: Erdball
- 1962: Victorina
- 1963: Anatol
- 1964: Bow Tie

== See also ==
- List of German flat horse races
