= Steel Heart (horse) =

Irish-bred Thoroughbred racehorse

- Sire: Habitat
- Grandsire: Sir Gaylord
- Dam: A. 1
- Damsire: Abernant
- Sex: Stallion
- Foaled: 25 March 1972
- Country: Ireland
- Colour: Bay
- Breeder: W. F. Davison
- Owner: Ravi Tikkoo
- Trainer: Dermot Weld
- Record: 12: 5-2-0

Major wins
- Gimcrack Stakes (1974); Middle Park Stakes (1974); Duke of York Stakes (1975); Goldene Peitsche (1975)

Awards
- Timeform rating 128 (1974), 127 (1975)

Steel Heart (25 March 1972 – 4 July 1994) was an Irish Thoroughbred racehorse and sire. He was the first major winner for the Irish trainer Dermot Weld. In 1974 he established himself as one of the best two-year-olds of his generation in Britain and Ireland when he won three of his five races including the Gimcrack Stakes and the Middle Park Stakes as well as finishing second to Grundy in the Dewhurst Stakes. In the following year he was mainly campaigned over sprint distances and had further success, winning the Duke of York Stakes and the Goldene Peitsche and finishing second in the July Cup. After his retirement from racing he became a successful breeding stallion in Japan.

== Background ==
Steel Heart was a "strong, good-looking" bay horse with no white markings bred in Ireland by W. F. Davison. He was from the second crop of foals sired by Habitat, an American-bred, British-raced miler who became one of the leading European stallions of the 1970s and 1980s. His other progeny included Habibti, Flying Water, Marwell, Rose Bowl and Steinlen and he was the British Champion broodmare sire on three occasions. Steel Heart's dam A. 1 showed little ability as a racehorse but was a successful broodmare who produced several other winners including Smokey Lady and was the female-line ancestor of King of Kings.

In the autumn of 1973 the yearling was offered for sale at the Newmarket Houghton sale and was bought for 71,000 guineas by representatives of the Indian shipping magnate Ravi Tikkoo. The colt was sent to be trained with Dermot Weld at the Rosewell House stable at the Curragh in Ireland.

== Racing career ==
=== 1974: two-year-old season ===
Steel Heart made his racecourse debut in May, when he won the five furlong Emily Persse Cup at Phoenix Park Racecourse. The runner-up Mark Anthony went on to win the Anglesey Stakes and the Beresford Stakes later in the year. Steel Heart was then sent to England for the Coventry Stakes at Royal Ascot in June and finished fifth behind Whip It Quick. He sustained an injury during the race and was off the course for the next two months.

On his return to the track Steel Heart started at odds of 17/2 for the Gimcrack Stakes over six furlongs at York Racecourse in August. Ridden by Lester Piggott he won by one and a half lengths from the July Stakes winner Auction Ring with It's Freezing (Tyros Stakes) in third place. At Newmarket Racecourse in October, with Piggott again in the saddle, Steel Heart was made the 10/11 favourite for the Group One Middle Park Stakes, with his opponents including Auction Ring, Tanzor (Acomb Stakes), Windy Glen (Star Stakes), Overtown (Norfolk Stakes and Red Cross (Chesham Stakes, Mill Reef Stakes). Racing on soft ground for the first time, Steel Heart took the lead a furlong out and held off the challenge of the 33/1 outsider Royal Manacle to win by a neck with a gap of three lengths back to Auction Ring in third.

On his final appearance of the season Steel Heart was moved up in distance for a much anticipated clash with the Champagne Stakes winner Grundy in the Dewhurst Stakes over seven furlongs on very soft ground at Newmarket. After being restrained in the early stages he moved up to challenge Grundy in the last quarter mile but proved no match for the British colt as he tired in the final furlong and was beaten six lengths into second place.

=== 1975: three-year-old season ===
On his three-year-old debut Steel Heart was tried over a distance of one mile for the first and only time when he contested the 2000 Guineas at Newmarket and finished unplaced behind Bolkonski. For the rest of his career he was campaigned over sprint distances. On 15 May at York Racecourse he started at odds of 15/8 for the Duke of York Stakes over six furlongs and won by a length from the five-year-old Midsummer Star. He was then sent to Royal Ascot for the Cork and Orrery Stakes and finished fourth behind Swingtime, Street Light and Our Charlie, beaten a length by the winner, to whom he was conceding fourteen pounds. In the July Cup at Newmarket he appeared to be in "tremendous shape" before the race and finished second, beaten half a length by the French filly Lianga. Unusually for a top class European racehorse, Steel Heart was then entered in a major all-aged handicap race and was assigned top weight of 133 pounds for the Stewards' Cup at Goodwood Racecourse. He stayed on well in the closing stages and finished fourth of the twenty-one runners behind Import, a four-year-old colt who was carrying 109 pounds.

Steel Heart was then sent to West Germany for the Group Three Goldene Peitsche at Baden-Baden in September and won by the locally trained five-year-old Tarik. On his final appearance of the season Steel Heart started second favourite for the Prix de Seine-et-Oise at Maisons-Laffitte Racecourse on 22 September. He failed to reproduce his best form as he finished seventh of the fourteen runners behind Realty.

== Stud record ==
At the end of his racing career, Steel Heart was syndicated for £10,000 a share, giving a theoretical value of £400,000. He began his stud career at the Ashleigh Stud in Clonee before being exported to Japan in 1979 and died on 4 July 1994. In Japan he sired the winners of more than 1,300 races including Nihon Pillow Winner (Yasuda Kinen, Mile Championship) and Takara Steal (Mile Championship).

== Assessment ==
There was no International Classification of European two-year-olds in 1974: the official handicappers of Britain, Ireland and France compiled separate rankings for horses which competed in those countries. In the British Free Handicap, Habat was assigned a weight of 126 pounds, placing him in fourth behind Grundy, Green Dancer, Cry of Truth and No Alimony. In the Irish Free Handicap he was ranked second behind Sea Break. The independent Timeform organisation gave him a rating of 128, making him six pounds inferior to Grundy, their best two-year-old of the season. In their annual Racehorses of 1974, Timeform described Steel Heart as a "good, honest and courageous colt". In 1975 British Free Handicap for three-year-olds Steel Heart was rated the fourth best colt behind Grundy, Bruni and Bolkonski. Timeform gave him a rating of 127, seven pounds behind their top sprinter Flirting Around and ten pounds behind Grundy.

== Pedigree ==
Pedigree of Steel Heart (IRE), bay stallion, 1972
Sire Habitat (USA) 1966	Sir Gaylord (USA); 1959	Turn-To	Royal Charger
Sire Habitat (USA) 1966	Sir Gaylord (USA); 1959	Turn-To	Source Sucree
Sire Habitat (USA) 1966	Sir Gaylord (USA); 1959	Somethingroyal	Princequillo
Sire Habitat (USA) 1966	Sir Gaylord (USA); 1959	Somethingroyal	Imperatrice
Sire Habitat (USA) 1966	Little Hut (USA); 1952	Occupy	Bull Dog
Sire Habitat (USA) 1966	Little Hut (USA); 1952	Occupy	Miss Bunting
Sire Habitat (USA) 1966	Little Hut (USA); 1952	Savage Beauty	Challenger
Sire Habitat (USA) 1966	Little Hut (USA); 1952	Savage Beauty	Khara
Dam A. 1 (GB) 1963	Abernant (GB); 1946	Owen Tudor	Hyperion
Dam A. 1 (GB) 1963	Abernant (GB); 1946	Owen Tudor	Mary Tudor
Dam A. 1 (GB) 1963	Abernant (GB); 1946	Rustom Mahal	Rustom Pasha
Dam A. 1 (GB) 1963	Abernant (GB); 1946	Rustom Mahal	Mumtaz Mahal
Dam A. 1 (GB) 1963	Asti Spumante (GB); 1947	Dante	Nearco
Dam A. 1 (GB) 1963	Asti Spumante (GB); 1947	Dante	Rosy Legend
Dam A. 1 (GB) 1963	Asti Spumante (GB); 1947	Blanco	Blandford
Dam A. 1 (GB) 1963	Asti Spumante (GB); 1947	Blanco	Snow Storm (Family:7)
