= 1965 British Grand Prix =

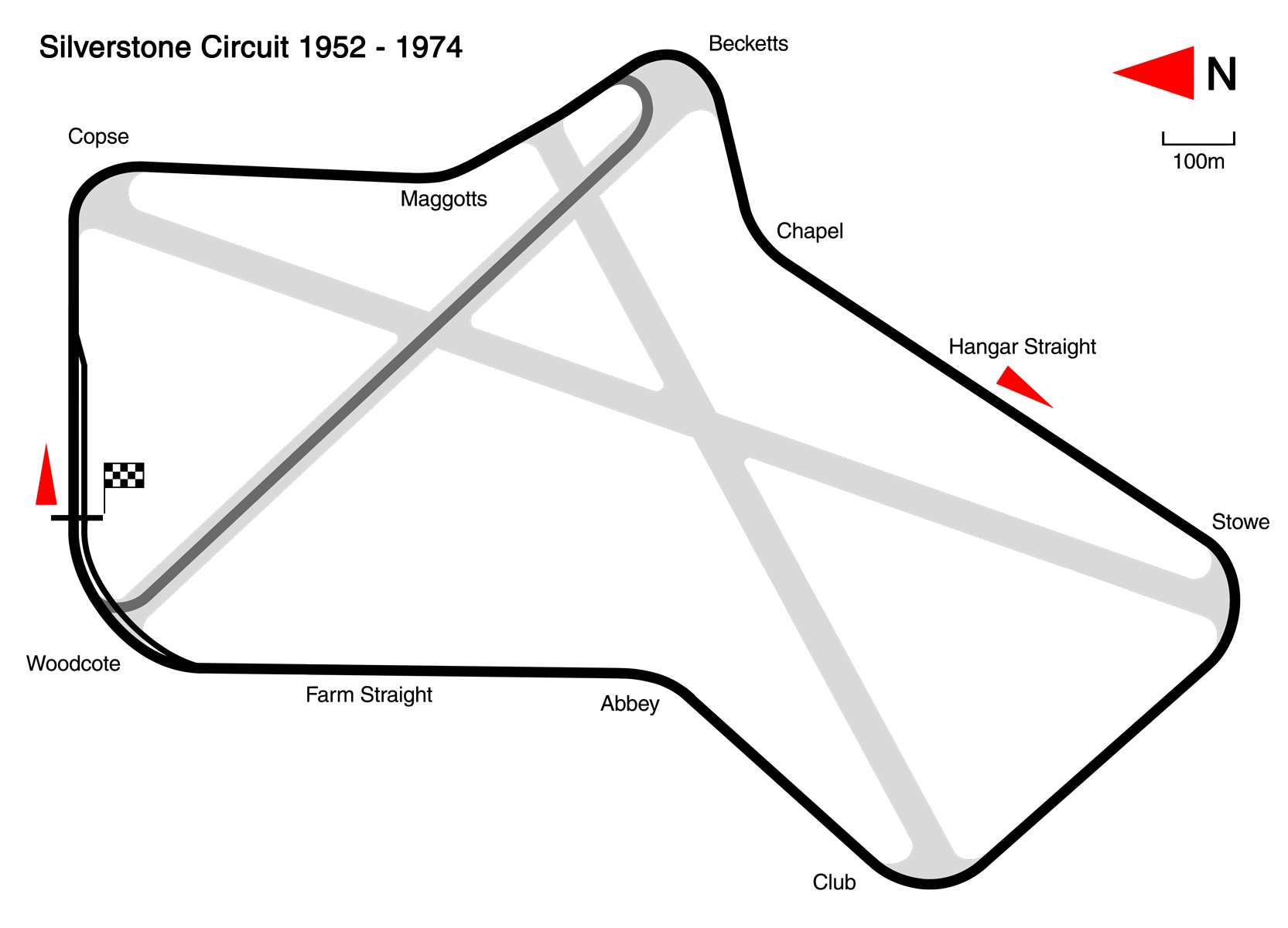

Race details
- Date: 10 July 1965
- Official name: XVIII RAC British Grand Prix
- Location: Silverstone Circuit; Silverstone, England
- Course: Permanent racing facility
- Course length: 4.711 km (2.927 miles)
- Distance: 80 laps, 376.880 km (234.160 miles)
- Weather: Warm, dry and overcast

Pole position
Driver	(United Kingdom) Jim Clark	Lotus-Climax
- Time: 1:30.8

Fastest lap
Driver	(United Kingdom) Graham Hill	BRM
- Time: 1:32.2 on lap 80

Podium
First	(United Kingdom) Jim Clark	Lotus-Climax
Second	(United Kingdom) Graham Hill	BRM
Third	(United Kingdom) John Surtees	Ferrari

The 1965 British Grand Prix was a Formula One motor race held at Silverstone on 10 July 1965. It was race 5 of 10 in both the 1965 World Championship of Drivers and the 1965 International Cup for Formula One Manufacturers. The 80-lap race was won by Lotus driver Jim Clark after he started from pole position. Graham Hill finished second for the BRM team and Ferrari driver John Surtees came in third.

== Race report ==
The race itself was dramatic. Clark led away from pole with Hill close behind. With 16 laps to go, the BRM driver had begun experiencing brake issues and was 35 seconds adrift of the leading Lotus. Then the Scot started to lose oil pressure, which was getting worse every lap. Clark – thinking fast – chose to nurse his car to the finish by killing the engine through the fast corners. This meant that he lost at least 2 seconds per lap, which allowed Hill to close up rapidly. At the chequered flag, Clark was still running, but his lead had shrunk to a mere 3 seconds. As of 2025, this was the last British Grand Prix to have an all British podium.

== Classification ==
=== Qualifying ===
Pos	No	Driver	Constructor	Time	Gap
1	5	(United Kingdom) Jim Clark	Lotus-Climax	1:30.8	—
2	3	(United Kingdom) Graham Hill	BRM	1:31.0	+0.2
3	11	(United States) Richie Ginther	Honda	1:31.3	+0.5
4	4	(United Kingdom) Jackie Stewart	BRM	1:31.3	+0.5
5	1	(United Kingdom) John Surtees	Ferrari	1:31.3	+0.5
6	6	(United Kingdom) Mike Spence	Lotus-Climax	1:31.7	+0.9
7	8	(United States) Dan Gurney	Brabham-Climax	1:31.9	+1.1
8	7	(Australia) Jack Brabham	Brabham-Climax	1:32.5	+1.7
9	2	(Italy) Lorenzo Bandini	Ferrari	1:32.7	+1.9
10	14	(New Zealand) Denny Hulme	Brabham-Climax	1:32.7	+1.9
11	9	(New Zealand) Bruce McLaren	Cooper-Climax	1:32.8	+2.0
12	10	(Austria) Jochen Rindt	Cooper-Climax	1:32.9	+2.1
13	17	(Australia) Frank Gardner	Brabham-BRM	1:33.4	+2.6
14	15	(Sweden) Jo Bonnier	Brabham-Climax	1:33.5	+2.7
15	23	(United Kingdom) Innes Ireland	Lotus-BRM	1:33.6	+2.8
16	22	(United Kingdom) Richard Attwood	Lotus-BRM	1:33.8	+3.0
17	18	(United Kingdom) Bob Anderson	Brabham-Climax	1:34.1	+3.3
18	16	(Switzerland) Jo Siffert	Brabham-BRM	1:34.2	+3.4
19	24	(New Zealand) Chris Amon	Brabham-BRM	1:35.3	+4.5
20	12	(United States) Masten Gregory	BRM	1:35.9	+5.1
21	24	(United Kingdom) Ian Raby	Brabham-BRM	1:36.0	+5.2
22	25	(United Kingdom) Alan Rollinson	Cooper-Ford	1:39.0	+8.2
23	20	(United Kingdom) John Rhodes	Cooper-Climax	1:39.4	+8.6
DNQ	26	(United Kingdom) Brian Gubby	Lotus-Climax	1:45.1	+14.3

=== Race ===
Pos	No	Driver	Constructor	Laps	Time/Retired	Grid	Points
1	5	(United Kingdom) Jim Clark	Lotus-Climax	80	2:05:25.4	1	9
2	3	(United Kingdom) Graham Hill	BRM	80	+3.2 secs	2	6
3	1	(United Kingdom) John Surtees	Ferrari	80	+27.6 secs	5	4
4	6	(United Kingdom) Mike Spence	Lotus-Climax	80	+39.6 secs	6	3
5	4	(United Kingdom) Jackie Stewart	BRM	80	+1:14.6	4	2
6	7	(United States) Dan Gurney	Brabham-Climax	79	+1 Lap	7	1
7	15	(Sweden) Jo Bonnier	Brabham-Climax	79	+1 Lap	14	
8	17	(Australia) Frank Gardner	Brabham-BRM	78	+2 Laps	13	
9	16	(Switzerland) Jo Siffert	Brabham-BRM	78	+2 Laps	18	
10	9	(New Zealand) Bruce McLaren	Cooper-Climax	77	+3 Laps	11	
11	24	(United Kingdom) Ian Raby	Brabham-BRM	73	+7 Laps	20	
12	12	(United States) Masten Gregory	BRM	70	+10 Laps	19	
13	22	(United Kingdom) Richard Attwood	Lotus-BRM	63	+17 Laps	16	
14	10	(Austria) Jochen Rindt	Cooper-Climax	62	Engine	12	
Ret	23	(United Kingdom) Innes Ireland	Lotus-BRM	41	Engine	15	
Ret	20	(United Kingdom) John Rhodes	Cooper-Climax	38	Ignition	21	
Ret	18	(United Kingdom) Bob Anderson	Brabham-Climax	33	Gearbox	17	
Ret	14	(New Zealand) Denny Hulme	Brabham-Climax	29	Alternator	10	
Ret	11	(United States) Richie Ginther	Honda	26	Injection	3	
Ret	2	(Italy) Lorenzo Bandini	Ferrari	2	Engine	9	
DNS	7	(Australia) Jack Brabham	Brabham-Climax	0	Car driven by Gurney	8	
DNS	24	(New Zealand) Chris Amon	Brabham-BRM		Car driven by Raby		
DNS	25	(United Kingdom) Alan Rollinson	Cooper-Ford		Non-starter		
DNQ	26	(United Kingdom) Brian Gubby	Lotus-Climax				

== Notes ==
- This was the Formula One World Championship debut race for British drivers John Rhodes, Alan Rollinson and Brian Gubby.

== Championship standings after the race ==
Drivers' Championship standings

Pos	Driver	Points
1	(United Kingdom) Jim Clark	36
2	(United Kingdom) Graham Hill	23
3	(United Kingdom) Jackie Stewart	19
4	(United Kingdom) John Surtees	17
5	(New Zealand) Bruce McLaren	8

Constructors' Championship standings

Pos	Constructor	Points
1	(United Kingdom) Lotus-Climax	36
2	(United Kingdom) BRM	31
3	(Italy) Ferrari	20
4	(United Kingdom) Cooper-Climax	8
5	(United Kingdom) Brabham-Climax	7

- Notes: Only the top five positions are included for both sets of standings.

Previous race: 1965 French Grand Prix	FIA Formula One World Championship; 1965 season	Next race: 1965 Dutch Grand Prix
Previous race: 1964 British Grand Prix	British Grand Prix	Next race: 1966 British Grand Prix
