= Brian Gubby =

British racing driver and racehorse trainer (born 1934)

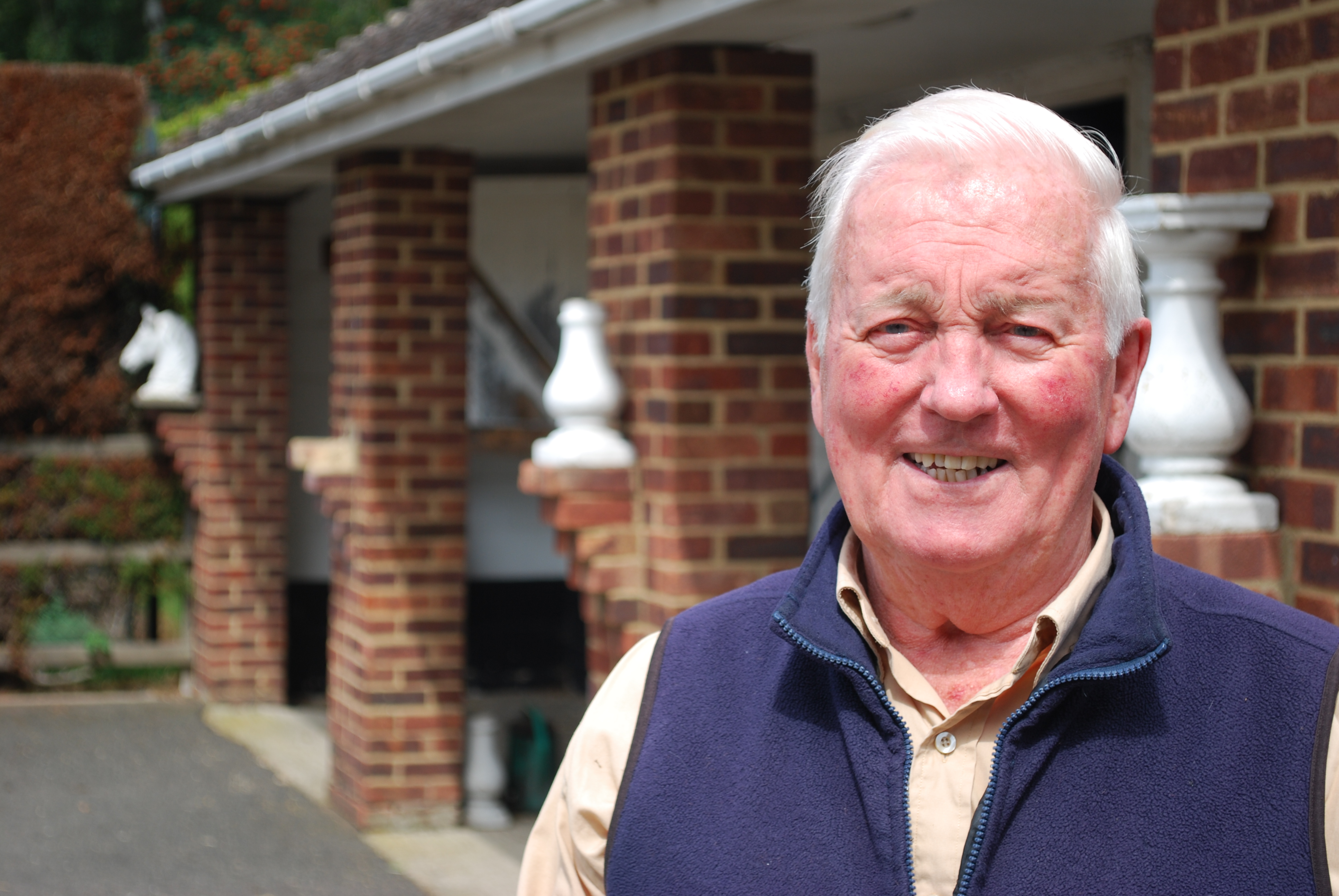
- Brian Gubby in 2011
- Born: 17 April 1934 (age 92); Epsom, Surrey, England, UK

Formula One World Championship career
- Nationality: (United Kingdom) British
- Active years: 1965
- Team: privateer Lotus
- Entries: 1 (0 starts)
- Championships: 0
- Wins: 0
- Podiums: 0
- Career points: 0
- Pole positions: 0
- Fastest laps: 0
- First entry: 1965 British Grand Prix

Brian Gubby (born 17 April 1934) is a British racehorse trainer and former racing driver from England. As a racing driver, Gubby briefly competed in Formula One during the 1960s.

== Early life and career ==
Gubby was born in Epsom, Surrey.

After completing his national service in the 1950s, Gubby became a freelance motor trader, and throughout his career he developed his business interests to include several garages and car showrooms, a hotel and a building company.

=== Motor racing ===
Gubby started his motor sport career in rallying, and also raced a Speedwell-tuned Austin A30 and a 3.8 litre Jaguar before switching to single-seaters in Formula Junior in the early 1960s. During this time, he raced a Lotus Eleven, a Lotus 18, and also a rare Ausper T4. He witnessed the death of his friend Dennis Taylor at a Formula Junior race at Monte Carlo in 1962, later describing it as the worst accident he had seen. Taylor's car touched wheels with that of Denis Hulme, and Taylor crashed into a tree. "I had to dodge all the wreckage and I was nearly sick in the car," Gubby remembered.

Gubby subsequently progressed to Formula Libre and bought himself a dark blue Lotus 24. With this car he won the Gold Flake Trophy at Leinster and a race at Phoenix Park, and encouraged by this success, decided to move up to Formula One. He travelled to Sicily, with a very small crew in a VW pickup, having entered the 1964 Mediterranean Grand Prix at the Autodromo di Pergusa. In practice, having posted the eighth fastest time and outqualifying his closest rival Peter Revson by a second, Gubby's Lotus suffered a wheel failure and he crashed heavily through chainlink fencing. "Lotuses were always falling apart... I ended up upside down in the woods, cocooned in wire with a mouthful of leaves and grass," he recalled. He was able to disconnect the battery to help prevent a fire, and some Italian mechanics arrived on the scene to cut him free, but he was unable to take part in the race. The wheel that failed was one that he had obtained from the BRP team after one of his own wheels had developed a crack.

Gubby's single attempt to participate in a Formula One World Championship race, the 1965 British Grand Prix at Silverstone, also ended with problems in practice. At the Woodcote corner, his Lotus jumped out of sixth gear at 170 mph, and Gubby was forced to hold the gear lever in position whilst cornering at high speeds. He decided there and then to retire from the sport, and did not attend the following day's practice session. He later recalled, "I was driving on a shoestring, and I thought to myself, 'Brian, you've got a family to look after and you'll end up killing yourself.'" He had entered the 1965 Mediterranean Grand Prix, but withdrew his entry and sold his Lotus to Stirling Moss for use by a film company working with Steve McQueen.

=== Horse racing ===
Gubby was the son of a jockey, and after his career in motor racing he became a racehorse trainer, based in Bagshot, Surrey. The most successful horse he has trained to date is the sprinter Gabitat, winner of ten races including the Group 3 Duke of York Stakes at York in 1984, and the Group 3 Goldene Peitsche at Baden-Baden in 1984 and 1985. Other well-known horses trained by Gubby include Easy Dollar, Omaha City, Creek, and more recently Son of the Cat, which won the Stewards' Sprint Handicap at Goodwood in July 2011.

Gubby's 80-acre training facilities include a mile all-weather strip and a mile gallop, and at his peak, he kept as many as 16 horses in training, owning them all himself. Continuing into his late 70s with fewer horses, Gubby still performed most of the daily tasks himself, including driving the horsebox.

== Racing record ==
=== Complete Formula One World Championship results ===
(key)

Year	Entrant	Chassis	Engine	1	2	3	4	5	6	7	8	9	10	WDC	Points
1965	Brian Gubby	Lotus 24	Climax V8	RSA	MON	BEL	FRA	GBR; DNQ	NED	GER	ITA	USA	MEX	NC	0

=== Non-championship Formula One results ===
(key)

Year	Entrant	Chassis	Engine	1	2	3	4	5	6	7	8
1964	Brian Gubby	Lotus 24	Climax V8	DMT	NWT	SYR	AIN	INT	SOL	MED; DNS	RAN
1965	Brian Gubby	Lotus 24	Climax V8	ROC	SYR	SMT	INT	MED; WD	RAN		
