= 1962 German Grand Prix =

Formula One motor race held in 1962

Race details
- Date: 5 August 1962
- Official name: XXIV Grosser Preis von Deutschland
- Location: Nürburgring; Nürburg, West Germany
- Course: Permanent racing facility
- Course length: 22.810 km (14.173 miles)
- Distance: 15 laps, 342.015 km (212.595 miles)
- Weather: Heavy rain showers
- Attendance: 350,000

Pole position
Driver	(United States) Dan Gurney	Porsche
- Time: 8:47.2

Fastest lap
Driver	(United Kingdom) Graham Hill	BRM
- Time: 10:12.2 on lap 3

Podium
First	(United Kingdom) Graham Hill	BRM
Second	(United Kingdom) John Surtees	Lola-Climax
Third	(United States) Dan Gurney	Porsche

The 1962 German Grand Prix was a Formula One motor race held at the Nürburgring on 5 August 1962. It was race 6 of 9 in both the 1962 World Championship of Drivers and the 1962 International Cup for Formula One Manufacturers. The 15-lap race was won by BRM driver Graham Hill after he started from second position. John Surtees finished second for the Lola team and Porsche driver Dan Gurney came in third. The race was notable for having six different constructors taking the first six positions.

== Race ==
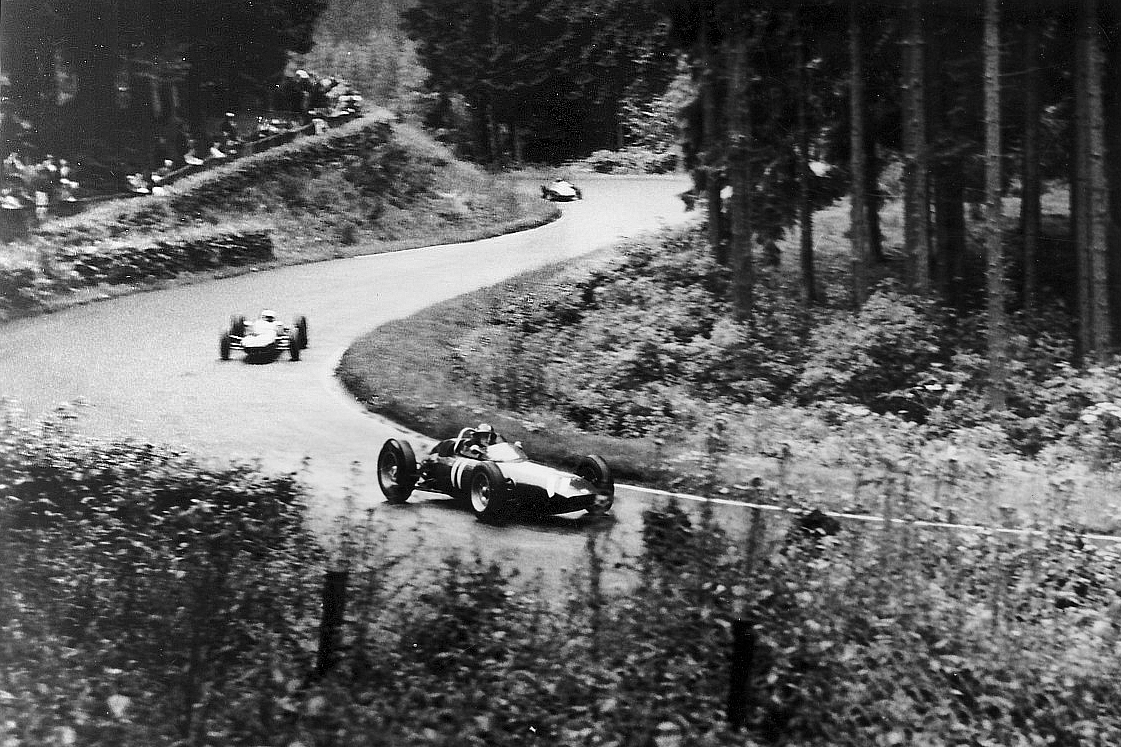
Graham Hill, leading Surtees and Gurney. These are the positions in which the race ended.

After a heavy midday downpour, the race was delayed by over an hour as streams of water and mud covered parts of the track. It never dried fully, and the race was run in wet conditions. Graham Hill drove masterfully in the wet conditions, followed by John Surtees who was gradually proving himself a great driver. He reached third position in the championship with this race, but was not to score any more points in 1962. Dan Gurney's Porsche had less than impressive handling but he finished third after passing Phil Hill, whose Ferrari was doing much better than at Aintree just 2 weeks prior. Hill, however, had to pit with oil on his visor and retired with a broken rear suspension soon thereafter. After a disastrous strike had kept them out of the last two races, Ferrari returned in force with four 156s built to different specifications. Hill had the newest version, with a six-speed transmission mounted fore of the engine. Giancarlo Baghetti drove a car with the usual transmission and finished tenth, whereas Ricardo Rodríguez drove last year's model with the 65 degree Tipo 188 engine - and got the best result of the team, finishing sixth. Lorenzo Bandini used a development car, with a regular nosecone, smaller radiator, and modified front and rear suspension. He crashed on the third lap, while in eleventh position.

Jim Clark absentmindedly forgot to turn on the fuel pump at the start, losing thirteen seconds and being in 26th place after the start. A rapid climb began, and he passed seventeen cars on the opening lap. He was closing in to the leaders with three to four seconds per lap, but after a few near crashes in the middle of the race he chose to ease off the pace a bit. Clark finished fourth, ahead of Bruce McLaren in a V8 Cooper. The other V8-engined Cooper was driven in practice by Tony Maggs, but a German TV-company's camera fell off Carel Godin de Beaufort's Porsche in practice, causing Graham Hill and Maggs to crash and total their cars. Maggs ran a Climax-engined backup car and finished ninth. The Grand Prix Drivers' Association's policy was to not carry cameras due to the safety risks, but de Beaufort was not a member.

Three new cars appeared in this race; the new BRM V8-engined Gilby, driven by Keith Greene, retired after about half the race with gearbox problems. The Belgian Maserati-engined ENB finished last; this car was a hodgepodge of parts from three old Emerysons equipped with a sharknose-style front end. This was its only appearance, and a hard worked Lucien Bianchi was only allowed to start thanks to the fact that several faster racers had not finished the minimum-required five laps. Gurney's fastest qualifying lap was 8:47.2; the ENB's fastest lap was 10:40.7, nearly two minutes slower. Most importantly, Jack Brabham's new BT3 finally appeared after a marathon effort by his mechanics. He spun the main bearings on the first day practice, and qualified with an engine built using parts from Trevor Taylor's car (his engine bent a valve). He started the race from the rear of the field, with the Climax engine from his Lotus 24. He climbed to ninth place by the end of the first lap, but then his throttle broke and he had to retire after nine laps. Nonetheless, Brabham was happy with the car, particularly the handling.

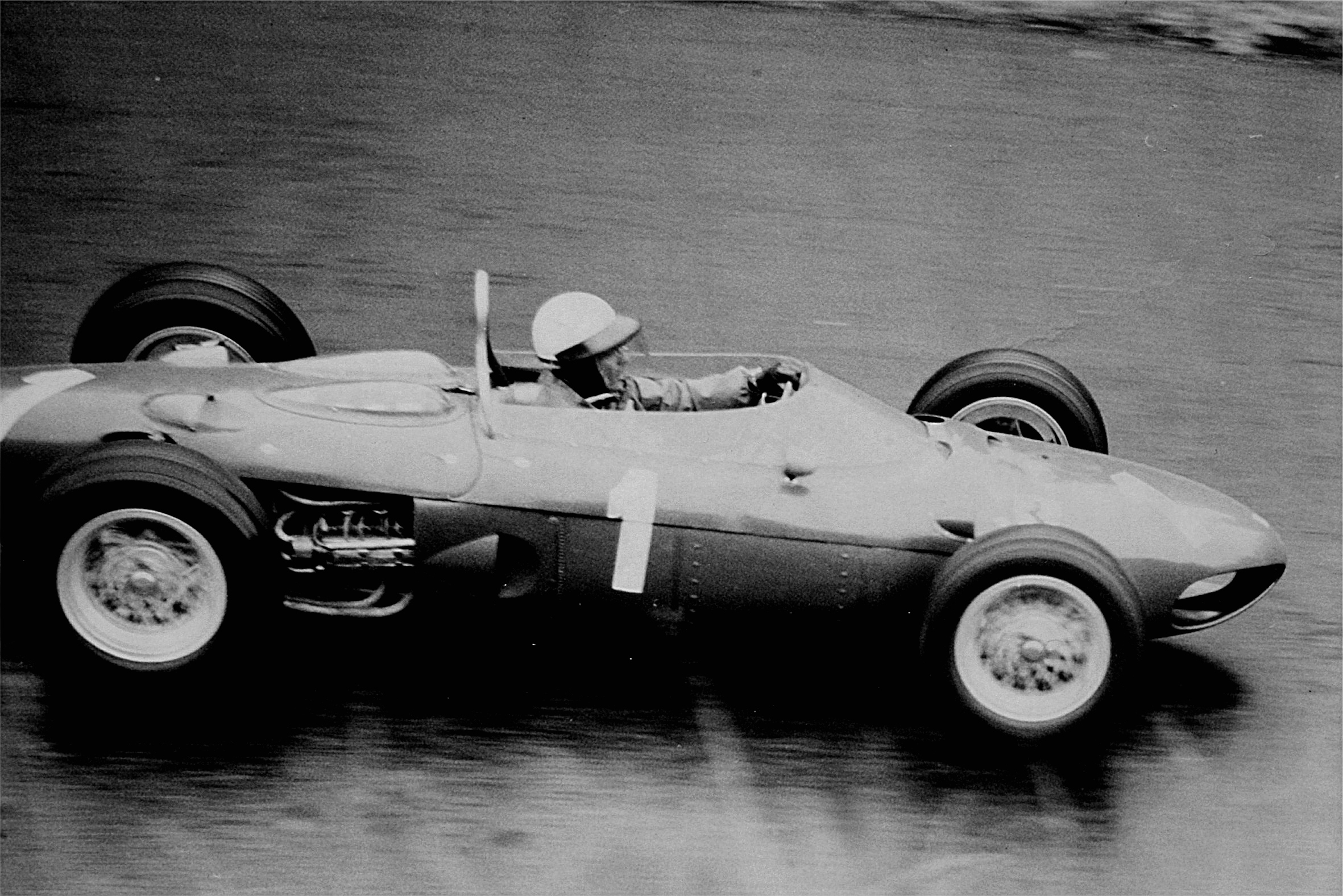
Phil Hill driving for Ferrari. He retired at just over half distance.

== Classification ==
=== Qualifying ===
Pos	No	Driver	Constructor	Qualifying times			Gap	Grid
Pos	No	Driver	Constructor	Q1	Q2	Q3	Gap	Grid
1	7	(United States) Dan Gurney	Porsche	9:08.8	8:47.2	9:20.5	—	1
2	11	(United Kingdom) Graham Hill	BRM	9:01.8	8:50.2	9:15.3	+3.0	2
3	5	(United Kingdom) Jim Clark	Lotus-Climax	9:17.2	8:51.2	9:51.7	+4.0	3
4	14	(United Kingdom) John Surtees	Lola-Climax	9:08.6	8:57.5	9:45.0	+10.3	4
5	9	(New Zealand) Bruce McLaren	Cooper-Climax	9:08.4	9:00.7	9:28.1	+13.5	5
6	8	(Sweden) Jo Bonnier	Porsche	9:10.8	9:04.0	9:12.2	+16.8	6
7	12	(United States) Richie Ginther	BRM	9:05.9	9:06.1	9:16.1	+18.7	7
8	18	(Netherlands) Carel Godin de Beaufort	Porsche	9:12.9	9:17.5	9:31.8	+25.7	8
9	15	(United Kingdom) Roy Salvadori	Lola-Climax	9:29.1	9:14.1	10:36.7	+26.9	9
10	3	(Mexico) Ricardo Rodríguez	Ferrari	No time	9:14.2	9:20.3	+27.0	10
11	17	(France) Maurice Trintignant	Lotus-Climax	9:27.1	9:19.0	9:30.7	+31.8	11
12	1	(United States) Phil Hill	Ferrari	No time	9:33.0	9:24.7	+37.5	12
13	2	(Italy) Giancarlo Baghetti	Ferrari	No time	9:28.1	10:07.3	+40.9	13
14	32	(Switzerland) Heini Walter	Porsche	No time	9:30.0	10:16.1	+42.8	14
15	26	(Italy) Nino Vaccarella	Porsche	9:33.8	9:35.7	10:21.4	+46.6	15
16	25	(United Kingdom) Ian Burgess	Cooper-Climax	10:20.1	9:42.6	9:39.2	+52.0	16
17	19	(Switzerland) Jo Siffert	Lotus-Climax	10:04.0	9:39.3	9:56.7	+52.1	17
18	4	(Italy) Lorenzo Bandini	Ferrari	No time	9:39.7	10:26.4	+52.5	18
19	27	(United Kingdom) Keith Greene	Gilby-BRM	10:08.1	10:22.7	9:47.1	+59.9	19
20	28	(Switzerland) Heinz Schiller	Lotus-BRM	11:20.4	9:51.5	9:55.0	+1:04.7	20
21	6	(United Kingdom) Trevor Taylor	Lotus-Climax	No time	No time	9:57.0	+1:09.8	26^{1}
22	20	(United Kingdom) Jackie Lewis	Cooper-Climax	9:58.0	No time	10:35.4	+1:10.8	21
23	31	(France) Bernard Collomb	Cooper-Climax	10:09.7	10:11.9	14:09.4	+1:22.5	22
24	29	(New Zealand) Tony Shelly	Lotus-Climax	No time	No time	10:18.6	+1:31.4	DNQ^{1}
25	10	(South Africa) Tony Maggs	Cooper-Climax	(9:12.7)	(9:04.8)	10:21.2†	+1:34.0	23
26	16	(Australia) Jack Brabham	Brabham-Climax	No time	No time	10:21.6	+1:34.4	24
27	34	(West Germany) Wolfgang Seidel	Lotus-BRM	10:38.2	No time	10:44.1	+1:51.0	DNQ^{1}
28	21	(Belgium) Lucien Bianchi	ENB-Maserati	11:55.5	10:42.5	10:40.7	+1:53.5	25
29	30	(United States) Jay Chamberlain	Lotus-Climax	11:36.2	No time	11:12.9	+2:25.7	DNQ^{1}
-	34	(West Germany) Günther Seiffert	Lotus-BRM	No time	11:38.9	12:54.1	+2:51.7	

Notes

- ^1 – Four drivers were not allowed to start, as race organisers deemed they had not completed sufficient laps in practice. Trevor Taylor was eventually allowed, but was demoted to the back of the field.
- † – Maggs switched from his V8 primary machine to a four-cylinder back-up car after a crash during the second practice. His time during the third practice session was the only one that counted towards the grid.

=== Race ===
Pos	No	Driver	Constructor	Laps	Time/Retired	Grid	Points
1	11	(United Kingdom) Graham Hill	BRM	15	2:38:45.3	2	9
2	14	(United Kingdom) John Surtees	Lola-Climax	15	+ 2.5	4	6
3	7	(United States) Dan Gurney	Porsche	15	+ 4.4	1	4
4	5	(United Kingdom) Jim Clark	Lotus-Climax	15	+ 42.1	3	3
5	9	(New Zealand) Bruce McLaren	Cooper-Climax	15	+ 1:19.6	5	2
6	3	(Mexico) Ricardo Rodríguez	Ferrari	15	+ 1:23.8	10	1
7	8	(Sweden) Jo Bonnier	Porsche	15	+ 4:37.3	6	
8	12	(United States) Richie Ginther	BRM	15	+ 5:00.1	7	
9	10	(South Africa) Tony Maggs	Cooper-Climax	15	+ 5:07.0	23	
10	2	(Italy) Giancarlo Baghetti	Ferrari	15	+ 8:14.7	13	
11	25	(United Kingdom) Ian Burgess	Cooper-Climax	15	+ 8:15.3	16	
12	19	(Switzerland) Jo Siffert	Lotus-Climax	15	+ 8:15.5	17	
13	18	(Netherlands) Carel Godin de Beaufort	Porsche	15	+ 9:11.8	8	
14	32	(Switzerland) Heini Walter	Porsche	14	+ 1 Lap	14	
15	26	(Italy) Nino Vaccarella	Porsche	14	+ 1 Lap	15	
16	21	(Belgium) Lucien Bianchi	ENB-Maserati	14	+ 1 Lap	25	
Ret	20	(United Kingdom) Jackie Lewis	Cooper-Climax	10	Suspension	21	
Ret	1	(United States) Phil Hill	Ferrari	9	Suspension	12	
Ret	16	(Australia) Jack Brabham	Brabham-Climax	9	Throttle	24	
Ret	27	(United Kingdom) Keith Greene	Gilby-BRM	7	Suspension	19	
Ret	15	(United Kingdom) Roy Salvadori	Lola-Climax	4	Gearbox	9	
Ret	17	(France) Maurice Trintignant	Lotus-Climax	4	Gearbox	11	
Ret	4	(Italy) Lorenzo Bandini	Ferrari	4	Accident	18	
Ret	28	(Switzerland) Heinz Schiller	Lotus-BRM	4	Oil Pressure	20	
Ret	31	(France) Bernard Collomb	Cooper-Climax	2	Gearbox	22	
Ret	6	(United Kingdom) Trevor Taylor	Lotus-Climax	0	Accident	26	
DNQ	29	(New Zealand) Tony Shelly	Lotus-Climax				
DNQ	34	(West Germany) Wolfgang Seidel	Lotus-BRM				
DNQ	30	(United States) Jay Chamberlain	Lotus-Climax				
DNQ	34	(West Germany) Günther Seiffert	Lotus-BRM				
WD	-	(United Kingdom) Tony Marsh	BRM		Car not ready		
WD	-	(Italy) Carlo Abate	Lotus-Climax		Withdrawn		

== Notes ==
- This was the Formula One World Championship debut for Swiss driver Heini Walter and German driver Günther Seiffert.
- Dan Gurney achieved his first pole position; it was also the first for Porsche - both as a constructor and as an engine supplier.
- Jack Brabham debuted with a car of his own making, as Brabham made its debut in the Formula One World Championship.
- ENB also made its debut in this race, being the first Belgian constructor in Formula One World Championship history.

== Championship standings after the race ==
Drivers' Championship standings

	Pos	Driver	Points
	1	(United Kingdom) Graham Hill	28
	2	(United Kingdom) Jim Clark	21
2	3	(United Kingdom) John Surtees	19
1	4	(New Zealand) Bruce McLaren	18
1	5	(United States) Phil Hill	14

Constructors' Championship standings

	Pos	Constructor	Points
1	1	(United Kingdom) BRM	31 (32)
1	2	(United Kingdom) Lotus-Climax	27
	3	(United Kingdom) Cooper-Climax	23
1	4	(United Kingdom) Lola-Climax	19
1	5	(Germany) Porsche	16

- Notes: Only the top five positions are included for both sets of standings. Only the best five results counted towards the Championship. Numbers without parentheses are Championship points; numbers in parentheses are total points scored.

Previous race: 1962 British Grand Prix	FIA Formula One World Championship; 1962 season	Next race: 1962 Italian Grand Prix
Previous race: 1961 German Grand Prix	German Grand Prix	Next race: 1963 German Grand Prix
