= 1962 Monaco Grand Prix =

Coordinates: 43°44′4.74″N 7°25′16.8″E

Race details
- Date: 3 June 1962
- Official name: XX Grand Prix de Monaco
- Location: Circuit de Monaco; Monte Carlo
- Course: Temporary street circuit
- Course length: 3.145 km (1.954 miles)
- Distance: 100 laps, 314.500 km (195.421 miles)
- Weather: Cloudy

Pole position
Driver	(United Kingdom) Jim Clark	Lotus-Climax
- Time: 1:35.4

Fastest lap
Driver	(United Kingdom) Jim Clark	Lotus-Climax
- Time: 1:35.5 on lap 42

Podium
First	(New Zealand) Bruce McLaren	Cooper-Climax
Second	(United States) Phil Hill	Ferrari
Third	(Italy) Lorenzo Bandini	Ferrari

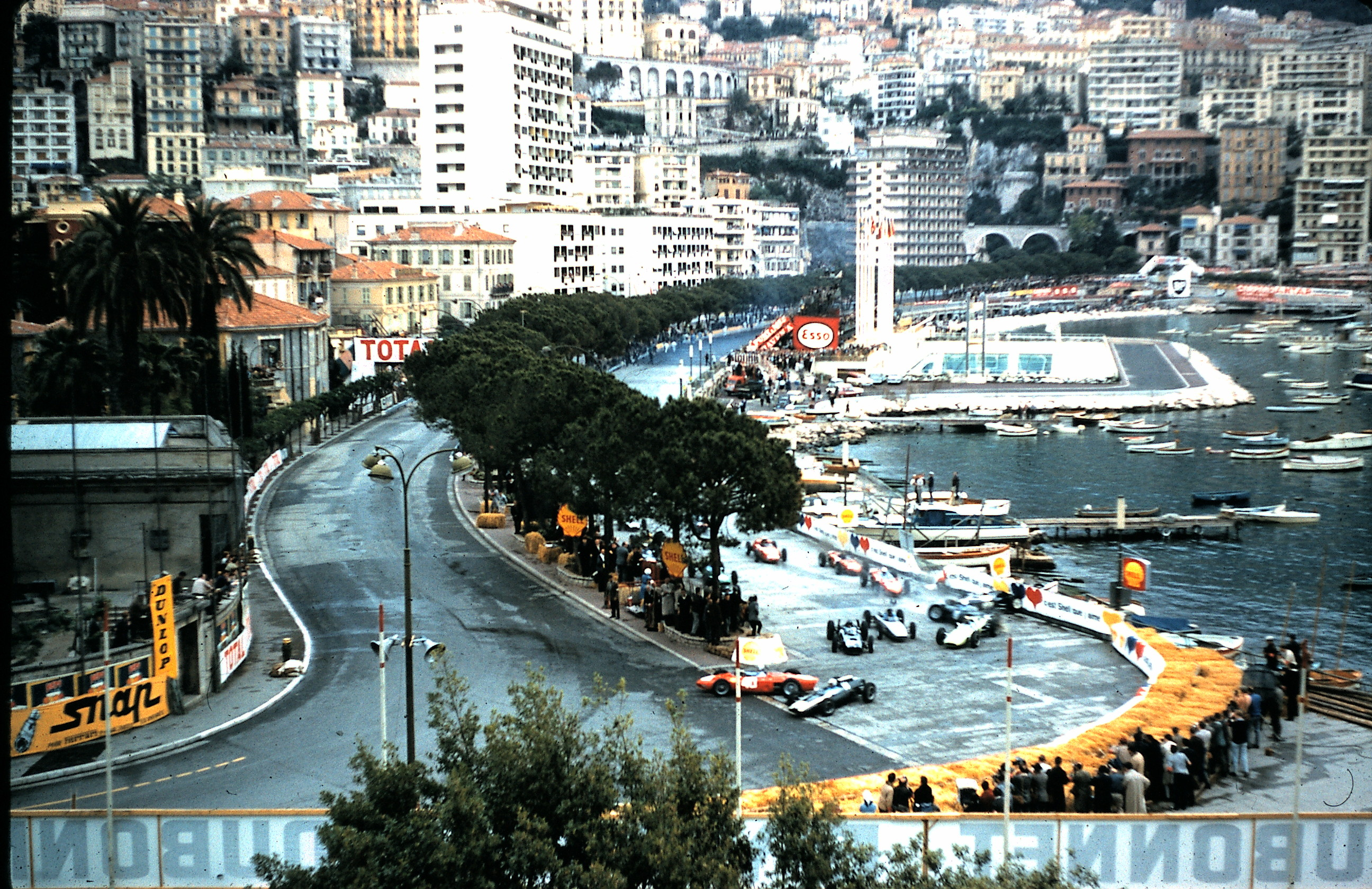
Crash at the Gasworks Hairpin on the opening lap

The 1962 Monaco Grand Prix was a Formula One motor race held at Monaco on 3 June 1962. It was race 2 of 9 in both the 1962 World Championship of Drivers and the 1962 International Cup for Formula One Manufacturers. The 100-lap race was won by Cooper driver Bruce McLaren after he started from third position. Phil Hill finished second for the Ferrari team and his teammate Lorenzo Bandini came in third.

== Report ==
Lotus's Jim Clark claimed the first pole position of his career, ahead of BRM's Graham Hill, Cooper's Bruce McLaren and Ferrari's Willy Mairesse. The organisers guaranteed two spots on the grid for each of the 5 works teams, leaving six grid spots for the remaining entries to fight over. This explains why some drivers with faster qualifying times failed to qualify whereas drivers with slower times qualified.

Mairesse got an excellent start from fourth on the grid and led into the first corner, the Gasworks hairpin, but braked too late and skidded around it. The concertina effect of the cars behind trying to avoid Mairesse's skidding car led to a collision further behind which eliminated Dan Gurney, Maurice Trintignant and Richie Ginther. A marshal, Ange Baldoni, was killed by the dislodged right rear wheel of Richie Ginther's BRM when it collided with the Lotuses of Maurice Trintignant, Innes Ireland and Trevor Taylor, as well as Dan Gurney's Porsche at the Gasometer hairpin on lap 1.

McLaren and Graham Hill both passed Mairesse on the exit of Gasworks hairpin; the New Zealander ended the first lap in the lead from the Englishman. Meanwhile, Mairesse spun at the station hairpin on the first lap, dropping down the order.

McLaren led until the seventh lap when he was passed by Graham Hill; the BRM driver held the lead all the way until lap 92, when an engine failure handed the lead back to McLaren who held on to win ahead of Ferrari's Phil Hill, who recovered from a spin earlier in the race. Hill's Ferrari team mate Lorenzo Bandini completed the podium places.

== Classification ==
=== Qualifying ===
Pos	No	Driver	Constructor	Qualifying times			Gap
Pos	No	Driver	Constructor	Q1	Q2	Q3	Gap
1	18	(United Kingdom) Jim Clark	Lotus-Climax	1:37.4	2:07.2	1:35.4	—
2	10	(United Kingdom) Graham Hill	BRM	1:37.7	1:58.3	1:35.8	+0.4
3	14	(New Zealand) Bruce McLaren	Cooper-Climax	1:39.1	2:23.7	1:36.4	+1.0
4	40	(Belgium) Willy Mairesse	Ferrari	1:48.2	1:59.4	1:36.4	+1.0
5	4	(United States) Dan Gurney	Porsche	1:38.2	2:22.4	1:36.4	+1.0
6	22	(Australia) Jack Brabham	Lotus-Climax	1:39.1	No time	1:36.5	+1.1
7	30	(France) Maurice Trintignant	Lotus-Climax	1:41.8	2:04.7	1:36.8	+1.4
8	34	(United Kingdom) Innes Ireland	Lotus-Climax	1:39.9	2:07.4	1:37.0	+1.6
9	36	(United States) Phil Hill	Ferrari	1:38.0	2:01.0	1:37.1	+1.7
10	38	(Italy) Lorenzo Bandini	Ferrari	1:42.2	2:01.3	1:37.2	+1.8
11	28	(United Kingdom) John Surtees	Lola-Climax	1:37.9	2:22.3	1:44.9	+2.5
12	26	(United Kingdom) Roy Salvadori	Lola-Climax	1:40.1	No time	1:38.5	+3.1
13	46	(Switzerland) Jo Siffert	Lotus-Climax	1:48.0	2:01.3	1:38.9	+3.5
14	8	(United States) Richie Ginther	BRM	1:44.9	2:04.5	1:39.0	+3.6
15	24	(United Kingdom) Jackie Lewis	BRM	1:40.5	2:23.9	1:39.0	+3.6
16	32	(United States) Masten Gregory	Lotus-BRM	1:39.8	2:03.5	1:39.2	+3.8
17	20	(United Kingdom) Trevor Taylor	Lotus-Climax	1:40.0	2:11.0	1:43.2	+4.6
18	38	(Mexico) Ricardo Rodríguez	Ferrari	1:40.1	2:00.8	No time	+4.7
19	2	(Sweden) Jo Bonnier	Porsche	1:43.5	2:05.7	1:42.4	+7.0
20	16	(South Africa) Tony Maggs	Cooper-Climax	1:43.3	2:05.5	1:42.7	+7.3
21	44	(Netherlands) Carel Godin de Beaufort	Porsche	1:45.9	2:07.4	1:44.4	+9.0
22	42	(Italy) Nino Vaccarella	Lotus-Climax	No time	2:01.8	No time	+26.4

Drivers that had to qualify on speed: only the six fastest would race.

=== Race ===
Pos	No	Driver	Constructor	Laps	Time/Retired	Grid	Points
1	14	(New Zealand) Bruce McLaren	Cooper-Climax	100	2:46:29.7	3	9
2	36	(United States) Phil Hill	Ferrari	100	+ 1.3	9	6
3	38	(Italy) Lorenzo Bandini	Ferrari	100	+ 1:24.1	10	4
4	28	(United Kingdom) John Surtees	Lola-Climax	99	+ 1 Lap	11	3
5	2	(Sweden) Jo Bonnier	Porsche	93	+ 7 Laps	18	2
6	10	(United Kingdom) Graham Hill	BRM	92	Engine	2	1
7	40	(Belgium) Willy Mairesse	Ferrari	90	Oil Pressure	4	
8	22	(Australia) Jack Brabham	Lotus-Climax	77	Accident	6	
Ret	34	(United Kingdom) Innes Ireland	Lotus-Climax	64	Fuel Pump	8	
Ret	18	(United Kingdom) Jim Clark	Lotus-Climax	55	Clutch	1	
Ret	26	(United Kingdom) Roy Salvadori	Lola-Climax	44	Suspension	12	
Ret	16	(South Africa) Tony Maggs	Cooper-Climax	43	Gearbox	19	
Ret	20	(United Kingdom) Trevor Taylor	Lotus-Climax	24	Oil Leak	17	
Ret	4	(United States) Dan Gurney	Porsche	0	Accident	5	
Ret	30	(France) Maurice Trintignant	Lotus-Climax	0	Accident	7	
Ret	8	(United States) Richie Ginther	BRM	0	Accident	14	
DNQ	46	(Switzerland) Jo Siffert	Lotus-Climax				
DNQ	24	(United Kingdom) Jackie Lewis	BRM				
DNQ	32	(United States) Masten Gregory	Lotus-BRM				
DNQ	44	(Netherlands) Carel Godin de Beaufort	Porsche				
DNQ	42	(Italy) Nino Vaccarella	Lotus-Climax				
DNS	38	(Mexico) Ricardo Rodríguez	Ferrari		Practice only		
WD	6	(Italy) Roberto Bussinello	De Tomaso-Alfa Romeo		Car not ready		
WD	12	(United Kingdom) Tony Marsh	BRM		Left the team		

== Notes ==
- This was the first of many pole positions in a Formula One World Championship race for future World Champion Jim Clark.
- Future Formula One World Championship Grand Prix winner Jo Siffert made his debut in this race.
- This was the third win of a Monaco Grand Prix for Cooper; thereby breaking the old record of two wins set by Maserati at the 1957 Monaco Grand Prix.
- It was also a fifth win of a Monaco Grand Prix for a Coventry Climax-powered car.

=== In popular culture ===
The plot of the Ocean's prequel film revolves around Danny Ocean's parents as they attempt to pull off a heist at the 1962 Monaco Grand Prix.

== Championship standings after the race ==
Drivers' Championship standings

	Pos	Driver	Points
	1	(United Kingdom) Graham Hill	10
1	2	(United States) Phil Hill	10
8	3	(New Zealand) Bruce McLaren	9
2	4	(United Kingdom) Trevor Taylor	6
16	5	(Italy) Lorenzo Bandini	4

Constructors' Championship standings

	Pos	Constructor	Points
3	1	(United Kingdom) Cooper-Climax	11
1	2	(United Kingdom) BRM	10
	3	(Italy) Ferrari	10
2	4	(United Kingdom) Lotus-Climax	6
2	5	(United Kingdom) Lola-Climax	3

- Notes: Only the top five positions are included for both sets of standings.

Previous race: 1962 Dutch Grand Prix	FIA Formula One World Championship; 1962 season	Next race: 1962 Belgian Grand Prix
Previous race: 1961 Monaco Grand Prix	Monaco Grand Prix	Next race: 1963 Monaco Grand Prix
