= Cooper T77 =

Formula One race car

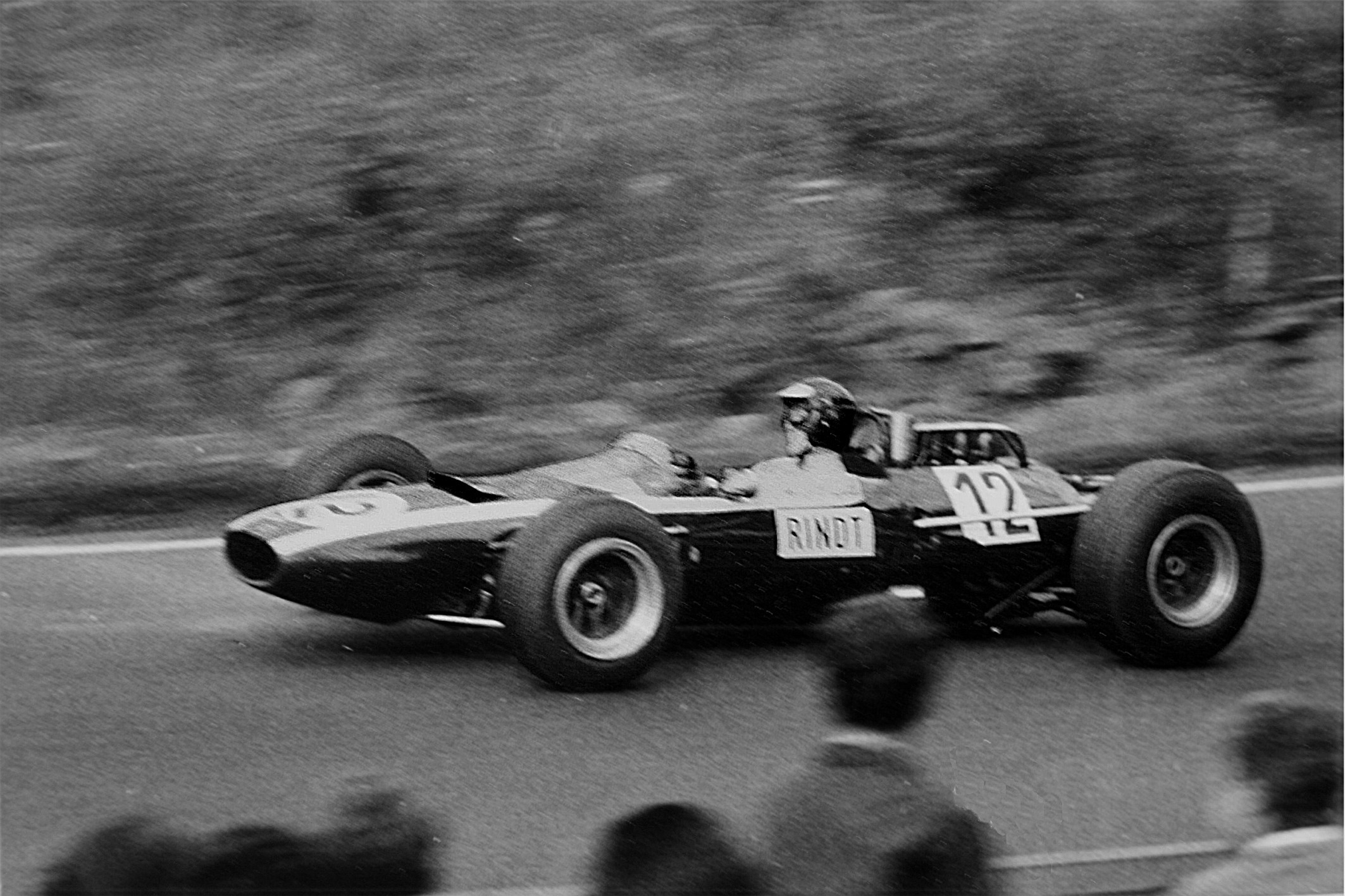
- Category: Formula One
- Constructor: Cooper Car Company
- Designer: Eddie Stait
- Predecessor: Cooper T73
- Successor: Cooper T81

Technical specifications
- Chassis: Steel spaceframe with partial stressed panels
- Suspension (front): Double wishbone, inboard coil spring and damper
- Suspension (rear): Lower wishbone, upper trailing arm and transverse link, coil spring and damper
- Engine: Coventry Climax FWMV 1.5-litre V8, naturally aspirated, rear mid, longitudinally mounted.
- Transmission: Cooper 6-speed manual gearbox.
- Tyres: Dunlop

Competition history
- Notable entrants: Cooper Car Company
- Notable drivers: (New Zealand) Bruce McLaren (Austria) Jochen Rindt
- Debut: 1964 Monaco Grand Prix
Races	Wins	Podiums	F/Laps
10	0	1	0

The Cooper T77 is a 1.5-litre Formula One car entered in the 1965 Formula One World Championship by the Cooper Car Company.

== Development ==
1965 saw Cooper in a state of flux. Cooper's founder Charlie Cooper had died in 1964 and his son John sold the company in April 1965. Designer Owen Maddock had left. The 1.5 litre formula was in its final year and the focus was on the new 3-litre formula. No real development was carried out and so the T77 was not much changed from the previous year's T73.

== Racing history ==
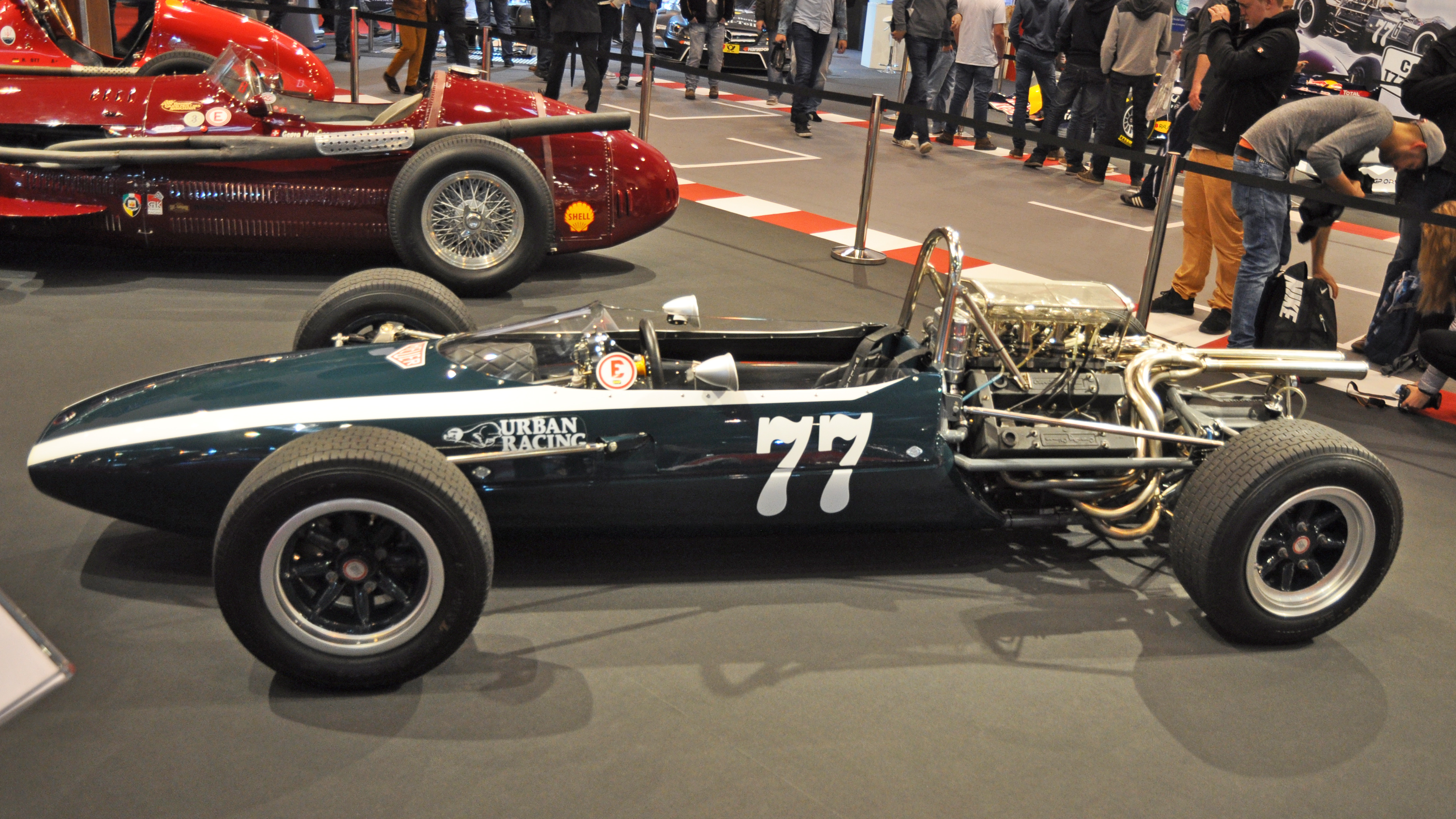
Cooper T77 chassis on display at the 2015 Essen Motor Show

The T77 made its World Championship debut at the 1965 Monaco Grand Prix, where McLaren finished fifth and Rindt failed to qualify. The rest of the season proved to be another disappointment for the team, their best result being McLaren's third place in Belgium, and Rindt's fourth place in Germany. McLaren finished ninth in the World Championship with 10 points and Rindt finished thirteenth with 4 points. In the Constructors' Championship, Cooper finished fifth.

This was McLaren's final year with Cooper. He left to form his own team. Jochen Rindt remained, driving the new T81, initially teamed with Richie Ginther, and then by John Surtees following his acrimonious departure from Ferrari.

Rindt's car was sold on and fitted with an ATS 2.7 litre V8 engine. Jo Bonnier practiced it at the 1966 French Grand Prix but found it too slow. Silvio Moser then drove it in the British Grand Prix. Starting twentieth, he did not finish the race because of an oil pressure problem.

== Formula One World Championship results ==
(key) (results in bold indicate pole position; results in italics indicate fastest lap)

Year	Entrant	Engine	Tyres	Drivers	1	2	3	4	5	6	7	8	9	10	11	Constructor	WCC	Points
1965	Cooper Car Company	Climax FWMV 1.5 V8	D		RSA	MON	BEL	FRA	GBR	NED	GER	ITA	USA	MEX		Cooper-Climax	5th	14
1965	Cooper Car Company	Climax FWMV 1.5 V8	D	Bruce McLaren		5	3	Ret	10	Ret	Ret	5	Ret	Ret		Cooper-Climax	5th	14
1965	Cooper Car Company	Climax FWMV 1.5 V8	D	Jochen Rindt		DNQ	11	Ret	14	Ret	4		6	Ret		Cooper-Climax	5th	14
1966	Anglo-Suisse Racing Team	ATS 2.7 V8	D		MON	BEL	FRA	GBR	NED	GER	ITA	USA	MEX			Cooper-ATS	NC	0
1966	Anglo-Suisse Racing Team	ATS 2.7 V8	D	Jo Bonnier			PO									Cooper-ATS	NC	0
1967	Charles Vögele	ATS 2.7 V8	D		RSA	MON	NED	BEL	FRA	GBR	GER	CAN	ITA	USA	MEX	Cooper-ATS	NC	0
1967	Charles Vögele	ATS 2.7 V8	D	Silvio Moser						Ret						Cooper-ATS	NC	0

== Formula One Non-Championship results ==
(key) (results in bold indicate pole position; results in italics indicate fastest lap)

1965	Cooper Car Company	Climax FWMV 1.5 V8	**D**		ROC	SYR	SMT	INT	MED	RAN
1965	Cooper Car Company	Climax FWMV 1.5 V8	**D**	Bruce McLaren	5		4	6		
1965	Cooper Car Company	Climax FWMV 1.5 V8	**D**	Jochen Rindt	7		Ret	Ret		
1967	Charles Vögele	ATS 2.7 V8	**D**		ROC	SPC	INT	SYR	OUL	ESP
1967	Charles Vögele	ATS 2.7 V8	**D**	Silvio Moser				Ret		
