= Cooper T73 =

Formula One race car

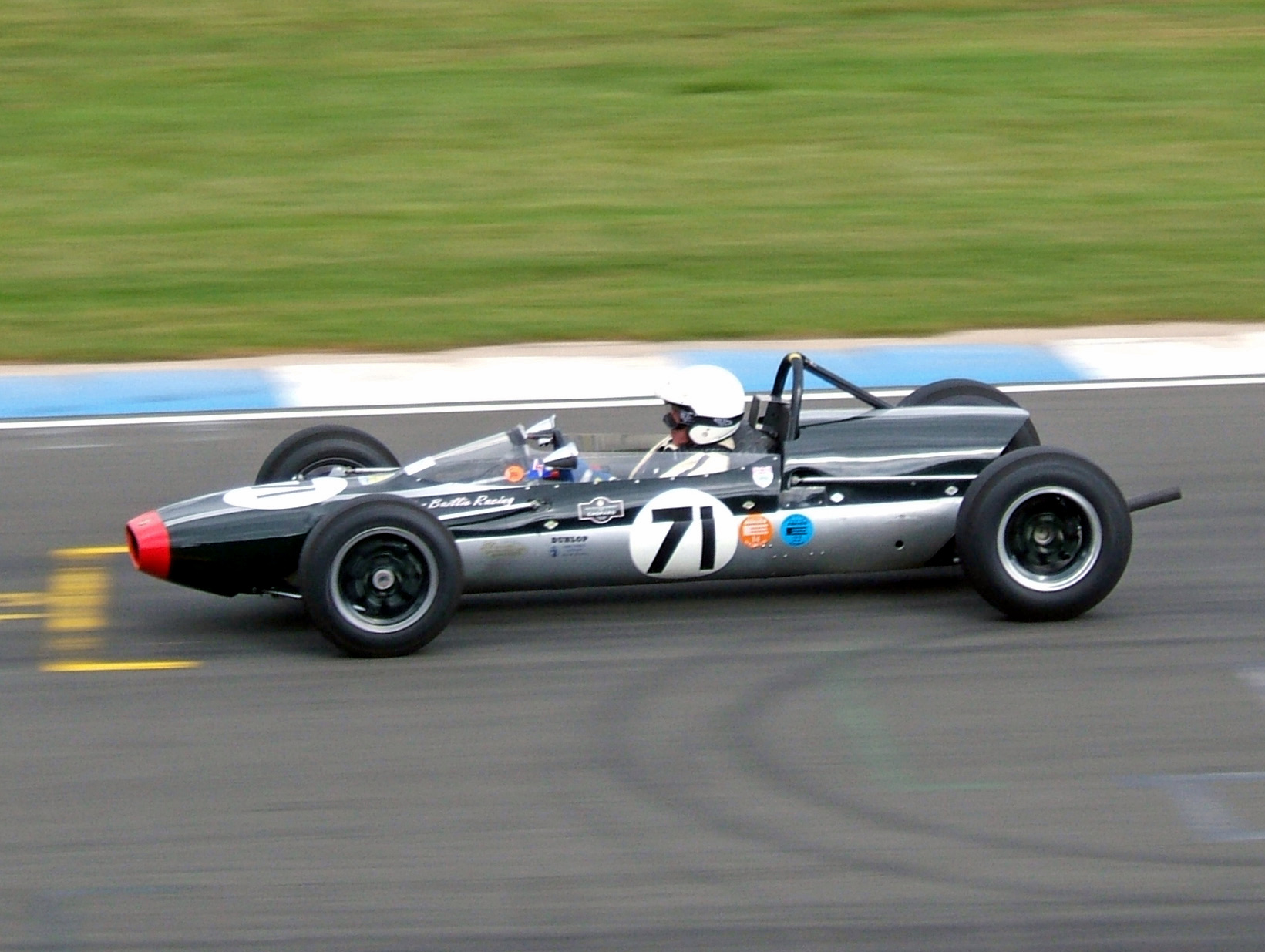
- Category: Formula One
- Constructor: Cooper Car Company
- Designer: Owen Maddock
- Predecessor: Cooper T66
- Successor: Cooper T77

Technical specifications
- Chassis: Steel spaceframe with partial stressed panels
- Suspension (front): Double wishbone, inboard coil spring and damper
- Suspension (rear): Lower wishbone, upper trailing arm and transverse link, coil spring and damper
- Engine: Coventry Climax FWMV 1.5-litre V8, naturally aspirated, rear mid, longitudinally mounted.
- Transmission: Cooper 6-speed manual gearbox.
- Tyres: Dunlop

Competition history
- Notable entrants: Cooper Car Company
- Notable drivers: (New Zealand) Bruce McLaren (United States) Phil Hill (Austria) Jochen Rindt
- Debut: 1964 Monaco Grand Prix
Races	Wins	Podiums	F/Laps
21	0	2	0

The Cooper T73 is a 1.5-litre Formula One car, designed, developed and produced by Cooper Cars for the 1964 Formula One season.

== Development ==
Bruce McLaren had persuaded Cooper to build a car, the T70, for the 1964 Tasman Series. It was based on the 1963 T66, and the T73 in turn was based on the T70. Consequently it still had a tubular steel chassis, but with additional stressed steel panels welded to the floor and sides. Front suspension was by double wishbones and inboard spring/dampers connected by rocker arms. At the rear there was a lower wishbone and a trailing arm connected to an upper link. The Tasman car had a small fuel tank for the shorter Tasman races, so the T73 had additional pannier tanks. As before, the Climax FWMV V8 supplied the power through a Cooper six-speed gearbox.

== Racing history ==
The T73 was driven by Bruce McLaren and Phil Hill in 1964, debuting at the Monaco Grand Prix. McLaren's car broke a wishbone in practice and he drove the previous year's T66 in the race, while Phil Hill retired with suspension failure. Thereafter, it was another season of disappointment, with McLaren's best results being second place in Belgium and Italy. He finished seventh in the World Championship. Hill had an even worse season, scoring a solitary one point and managing to crash both his T73 and the spare T66 in Austria, resulting in his temporary sacking by John Cooper, which resulted in him sitting out the Italian Grand Prix, replaced by John Love. The season ended with Cooper fifth in the Constructors' Championship.

McLaren and new teammate Jochen Rindt raced the T73 at the 1965 South African Grand Prix, after which it was replaced by the T77, although Rindt resorted to the spare T73 at the Italian Grand Prix when he bent a valve in his main car. One of the works cars was later sold to J.A. Pearce Engineering who fitted it with a Ferrari GTO 3-litre V12 and entered it in several races in 1966 and 1967 for Chris Lawrence. It was not particularly successful although it finished 5th in the 1966 International Gold Cup.

A derivative hybrid version, called the T71/73, was a mix between the T73 and the Formula 2 T71 chassis, powered by a 1.5 litre Ford Twin-Cam engine and built by Bob Gerard Racing and entered in the British Grand Prix in 1964 and 1965.

== Formula One World Championship results ==
Year	Entrant	Chassis	Engine	Tyres	Drivers	1	2	3	4	5	6	7	8	9	10	WCC	Points
1964	Cooper Car Company	T73	Climax FWMV 1.5 V8	D		MON	NED	BEL	FRA	GBR	GER	AUT	ITA	USA	MEX	5th	16
1964	Cooper Car Company	T73	Climax FWMV 1.5 V8	D	(United States) Phil Hill	9	8	Ret	7	6	Ret			Ret	9	5th	16
1964	Cooper Car Company	T73	Climax FWMV 1.5 V8	D	(New Zealand) Bruce McLaren		7	2	6	Ret	Ret	Ret	2	Ret	7	5th	16
1964	Cooper Car Company	T73	Climax FWMV 1.5 V8	D	(Rhodesia) John Love								DNQ			5th	16
1964	Bob Gerard Racing	T71/73	Ford 109E 1.5 L4	D	(United Kingdom) John Taylor					14						NC	0
1965	Cooper Car Company	T73	Climax FWMV 1.5 V8	D		RSA	MON	BEL	FRA	GBR	NED	GER	ITA	USA	MEX	5th	14
1965	Cooper Car Company	T73	Climax FWMV 1.5 V8	D	(New Zealand) Bruce McLaren	5										5th	14
1965	Cooper Car Company	T73	Climax FWMV 1.5 V8	D	(Austria) Jochen Rindt	Ret							8			5th	14
1965	Bob Gerard Racing	T71/73	Ford 109E 1.5 L4	D	(United Kingdom) Alan Rollinson					DNS						NC	0
1966	J.A. Pearce Engineering	T73	Ferrari Tipo 168 3.0 V12	D		MON	BEL	FRA	GBR	NED	GER	ITA	USA	MEX		NC	0
1966	J.A. Pearce Engineering	T73	Ferrari Tipo 168 3.0 V12	D	(United Kingdom) Chris Lawrence				11		Ret					NC	0

== Formula One Non-Championship results ==
Year	Entrant	Chassis	Engine	Tyres	Drivers	1	2	3	4	5	6	7	8
1964	Cooper Car Company	T73	Climax FWMV 1.5 V8	D		DMT	NWT	SYR	AIN	INT	SOL	MED	RAN
1964	Cooper Car Company	T73	Climax FWMV 1.5 V8	D	(New Zealand) Bruce McLaren				Ret	15			
1964	Bob Gerard Racing	T71/73	Ford 109E 1.5 L4	D	(United Kingdom) John Taylor		7		5	10			
1965	Bob Gerard Racing	T71/73	Ford 109E 1.5 L4	D		ROC	SYR	SMT	INT	MED	RAN		
1965	Bob Gerard Racing	T71/73	Ford 109E 1.5 L4	D	(United Kingdom) John Rhodes	11		8	Ret				
1965	Bob Gerard Racing	T71/73	Ford 109E 1.5 L4	D	(United Kingdom) Piers Courage					DNQ			
1966	J.A. Pearce Engineering	T73	Ferrari Tipo 168 3.0 V12	D		RSA	SYR	INT	OUL				
1966	J.A. Pearce Engineering	T73	Ferrari Tipo 168 3.0 V12	D	(United Kingdom) Chris Lawrence				5				
1967	J.A. Pearce Engineering	T73	Ferrari Tipo 168 3.0 V12	D		ROC	SPC	INT	SYR	OUL	ESP		
1967	J.A. Pearce Engineering	T73	Ferrari Tipo 168 3.0 V12	D	(United Kingdom) Chris Lawrence	8							
1967	J.A. Pearce Engineering	T73	Ferrari Tipo 168 3.0 V12	D	(United Kingdom) Robin Darlington			WD					
