= Jo Siffert =

Swiss racing driver (1936–1971)

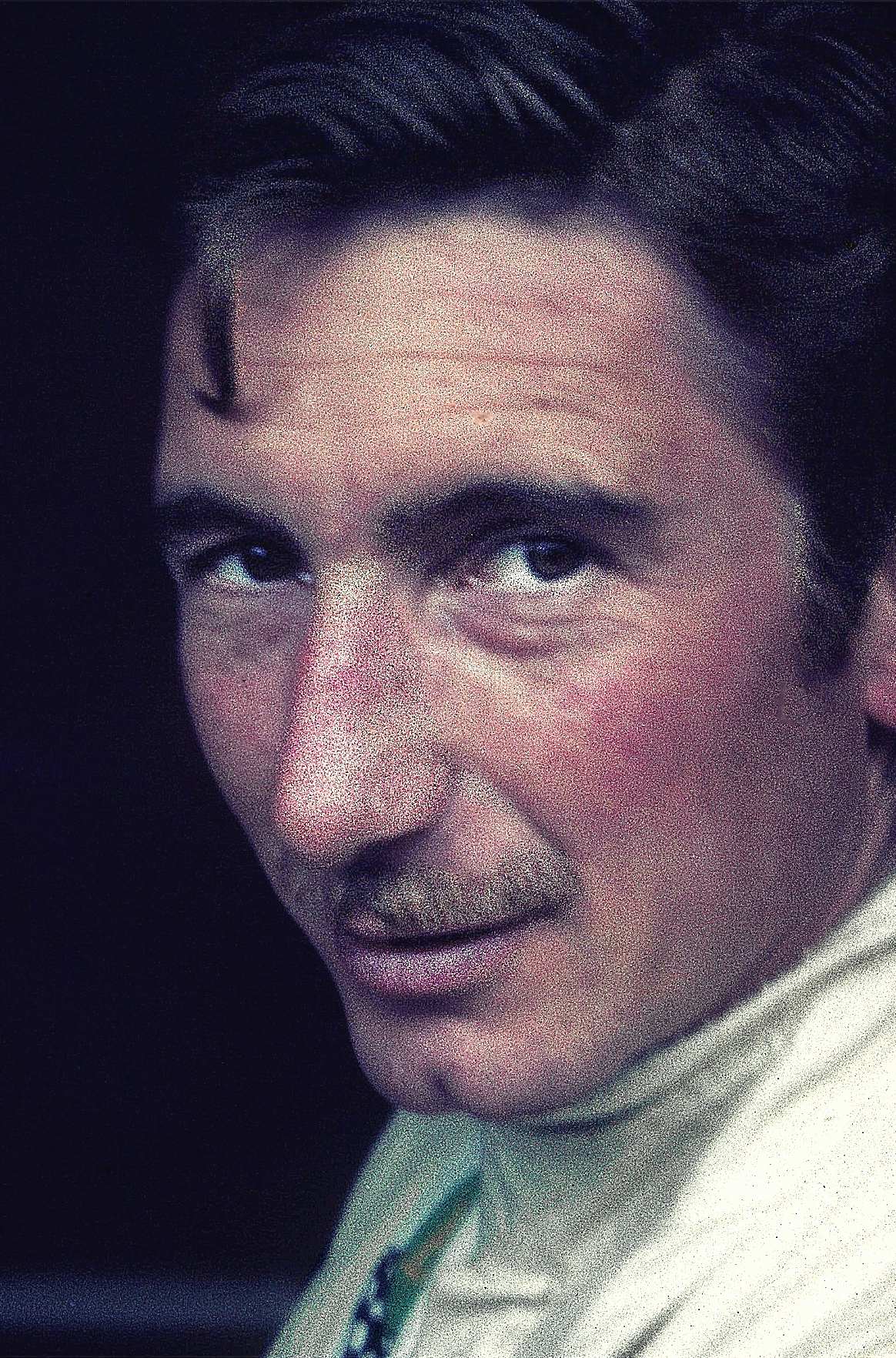
- Siffert in 1968
- Born: Joseph Siffert; 7 July 1936; Fribourg, Switzerland
- Died: 24 October 1971 (aged 35); Brands Hatch, Kent, England
- Cause of death: Smoke inhalation after a collision at the 1971 World Championship Victory Race
- Children: 2

Formula One World Championship career
- Nationality: (Switzerland) Swiss
- Active years: 1962–1971
- Team(s): Privateer Lotus, Filipinetti, privateer Brabham, Walker, March, BRM
- Entries: 100 (96 starts)
- Championships: 0
- Wins: 2
- Podiums: 6
- Career points: 68
- Pole positions: 2
- Fastest laps: 4
- First entry: 1962 Monaco Grand Prix
- First win: 1968 British Grand Prix
- Last win: 1971 Austrian Grand Prix
- Last entry: 1971 United States Grand Prix

24 Hours of Le Mans career
- Years: 1965–1971
- Teams: Maserati, Porsche
- Best finish: 4th (1966)
- Class wins: 2 (1966, 1967)

Joseph "Jo" Siffert (French pronunciation: [ʒo(zɛf) sifɛʁ]; 7 July 1936 – 24 October 1971) was a Swiss racing driver, who competed in Formula One from 1962 to 1971. Siffert won two Formula One Grands Prix across 10 seasons.

Affectionately known as "Seppi" to his family and friends, Siffert was born in Fribourg, the son of a dairy owner. He initially made his name in racing on two wheels, winning the Swiss 350 cc motorcycle championship in 1959, before switching to four wheels with a Formula Junior Stanguellini. Siffert graduated to Formula One as a privateer in 1962, with a four-cylinder Lotus-Climax. He later moved to Swiss team Scuderia Filipinetti, and in 1964 joined Rob Walker's private British Rob Walker Racing Team. Early successes included victories in the 1964 and 1965 Mediterranean Grands Prix non-Championship Formula One races, both times beating Jim Clark by a very narrow margin. He won two World Championship races, one for the Rob Walker Racing Team and one for BRM.

Siffert died at the 1971 World Championship Victory Race, a non-Championship Formula One race, having his car roll over after a crash caused by a mechanical failure and being caught under the burning vehicle. Siffert was married twice, wedded with his second wife Simone from the height of his career in the late 1960s to the time of his death. They had two children together, Véronique and Philippe.

== Life and career ==
=== Early life ===
Siffert was born in 1936 in the town of Fribourg, Switzerland, 35 km (22 mi) from Bern to a poor family. Aged 12, Siffert and his father went to Bern to see the 1948 Swiss Grand Prix at the Bremgarten circuit, and it was at this event where Siffert wanted to be a racing driver.

=== Formula One ===
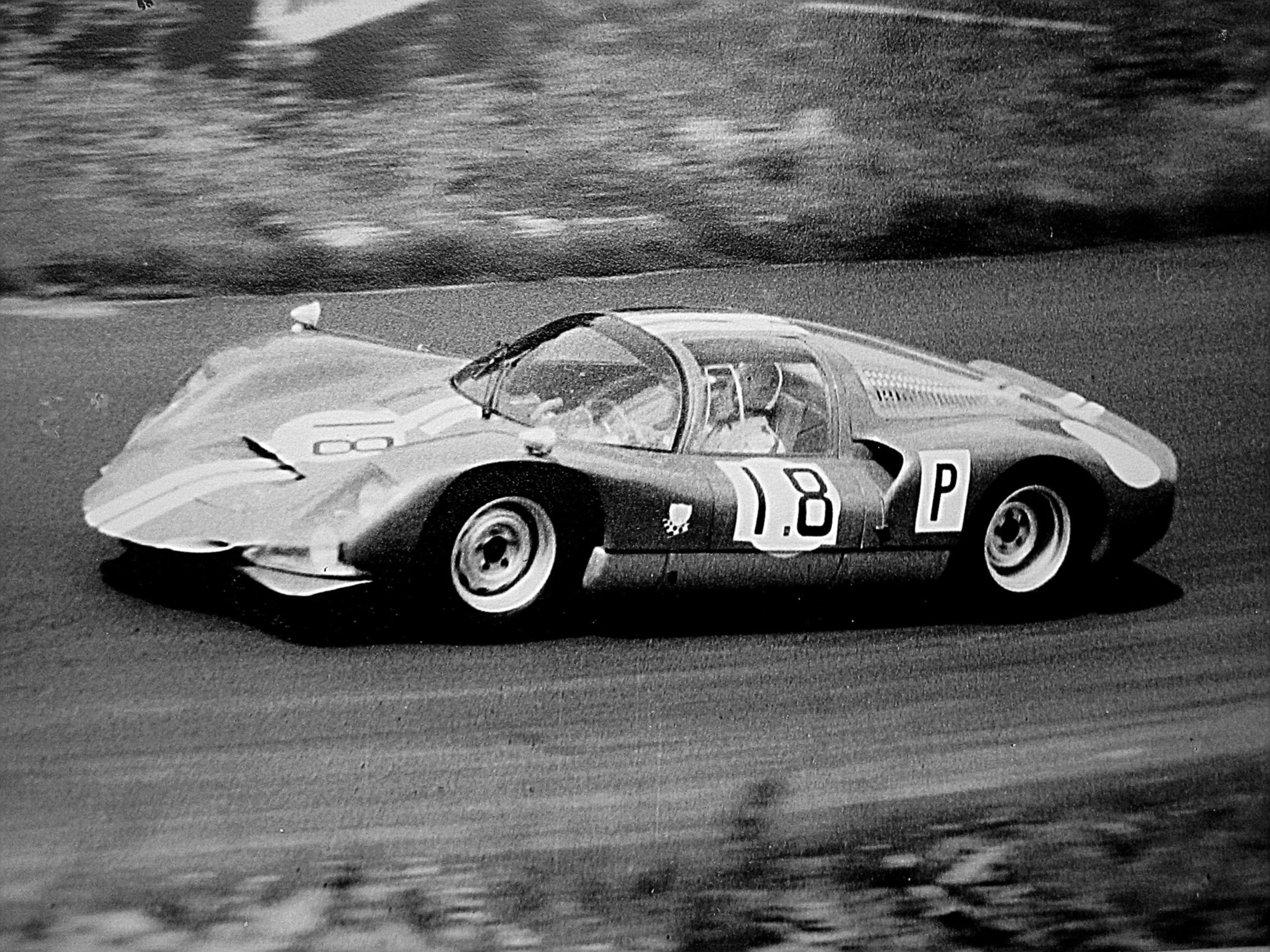
Siffert at the wheel of a Porsche 906 in practice for the 1966 1000 km Nürburgring race

In 1968, Siffert drove into the F1 history books by winning the 1968 British Grand Prix at Brands Hatch in Rob Walker Racing Team's Lotus 49B, beating Chris Amon's Ferrari into second place after a race-long battle. This is regarded as the last GP victory by a genuine privateer. In 1971 as a BRM team driver, he scored his second Formula One Championship race victory at the Austrian Grand Prix held at the Österreichring.

=== Sports cars ===
While Siffert's status in F1 grew slowly, his fame came as a leading driver for the factory Porsche effort in its quest for the World Sportscar Championship. In 1968, Siffert and Hans Herrmann won the 24 Hours of Daytona and the 12 Hours of Sebring in a Porsche 907, marking the first major outright wins for the company, apart from a few earlier victories on twisty tracks.

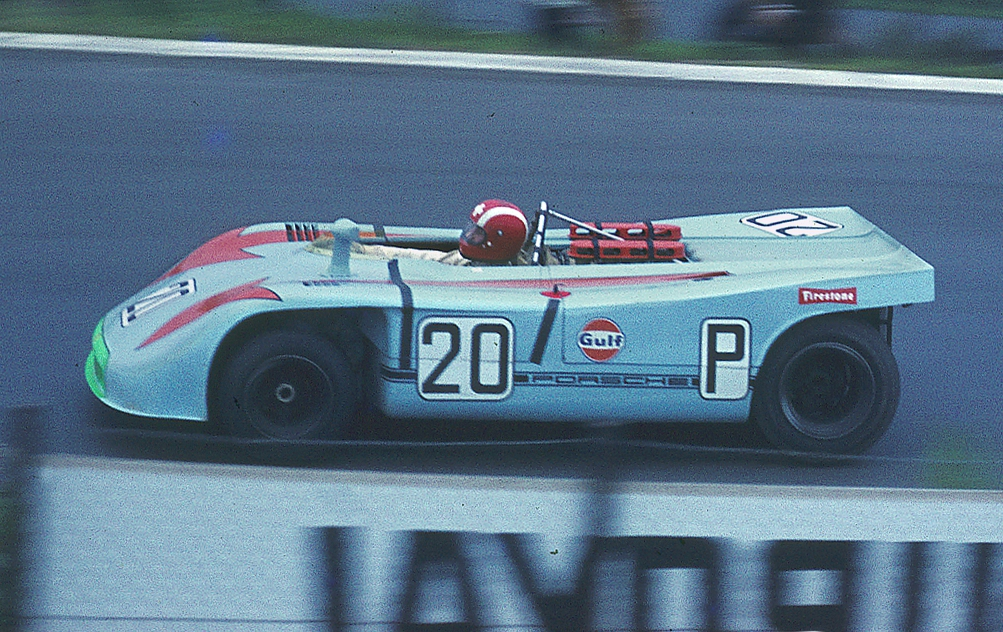
Siffert in the Porsche 908.03 at the 1970 1,000 km Nürburgring

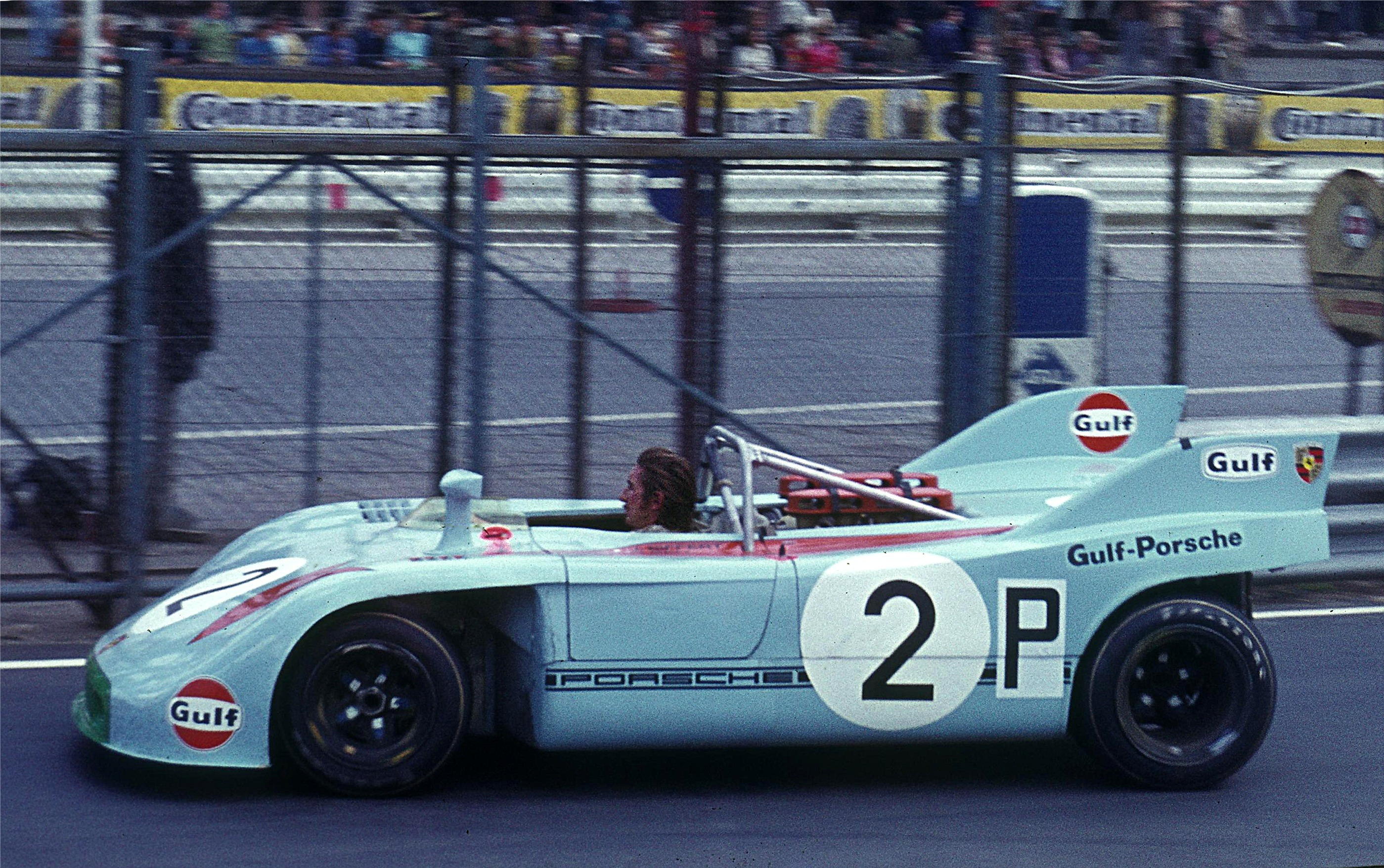
Siffert at the wheel of a Porsche 908

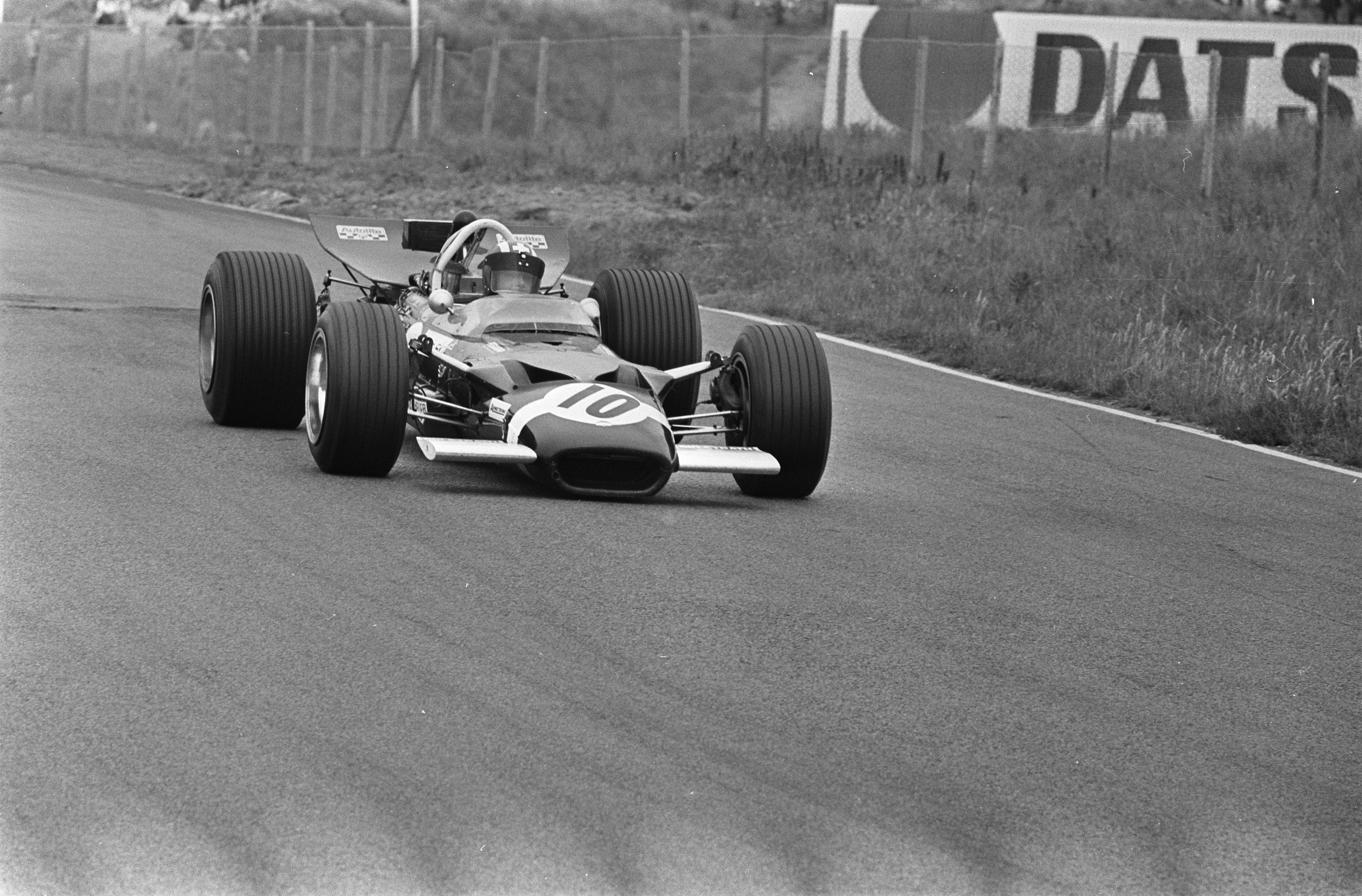
Siffert at the 1969 Dutch Grand Prix.

Later on, Siffert's driving displays in the Porsche 917 earned him several major wins in Europe. In addition, he was chosen by Porsche to help launch its CanAm development programme, driving a Porsche 917PA spyder in 1969 and finishing fourth in the championship despite few entries.

In 1970, Siffert teamed up with Brian Redman to drive a Porsche 908/3 to victory at the Targa Florio. That same year, Porsche bankrolled Siffert's seat in a works March Engineering F1 since the German company did not wish to lose one of their prize drivers to rival Ferrari. His association with March in F1 was disastrous, so he was pleased to join rival Porsche racer Pedro Rodriguez at BRM the following season.

=== Death ===
Siffert was killed in the non-championship World Championship Victory Race at Brands Hatch, Kent, England, the scene of his first victory in 1968. The suspension of his BRM had been damaged in a lap one incident with Ronnie Peterson, and broke later. This was not admitted by BRM until much later when it was accidentally divulged by a BRM ex-mechanic. The BRM crashed and immediately caught fire. Siffert could not free himself from the burning car.

In the subsequent Royal Automobile Club (the UK organising and regulatory representative of the FIA at the time) investigation, it was discovered that Siffert had only suffered a leg fracture in the initial crash but because three fire extinguishers failed to work properly no rescuers could reach Siffert for five minutes and he died of smoke inhalation. A fire marshall stated that if the fire extinguishers worked correctly then they could have reached Siffert within 20 seconds.

This accident led to a rapid overhaul of safety, both in-car and on circuit. On-board fire extinguishers (using BCF—bromochlorodifluoromethane, an aircraft product) became mandatory and also piped air for the drivers, direct into their helmets.

Siffert's funeral in Switzerland was attended by 50,000 people and a Gulf-Porsche 917 of Team John Wyer led the hearse and procession through the streets of Fribourg.

=== Legacy ===
In the final round of the 2007–08 A1GP season, at Brands Hatch, the A1 Team Switzerland car carried the message Jo 'Seppi' Siffert - 40th Anniversary - Brands Hatch. This commemorated his 1968 British Grand Prix victory at Brands Hatch.

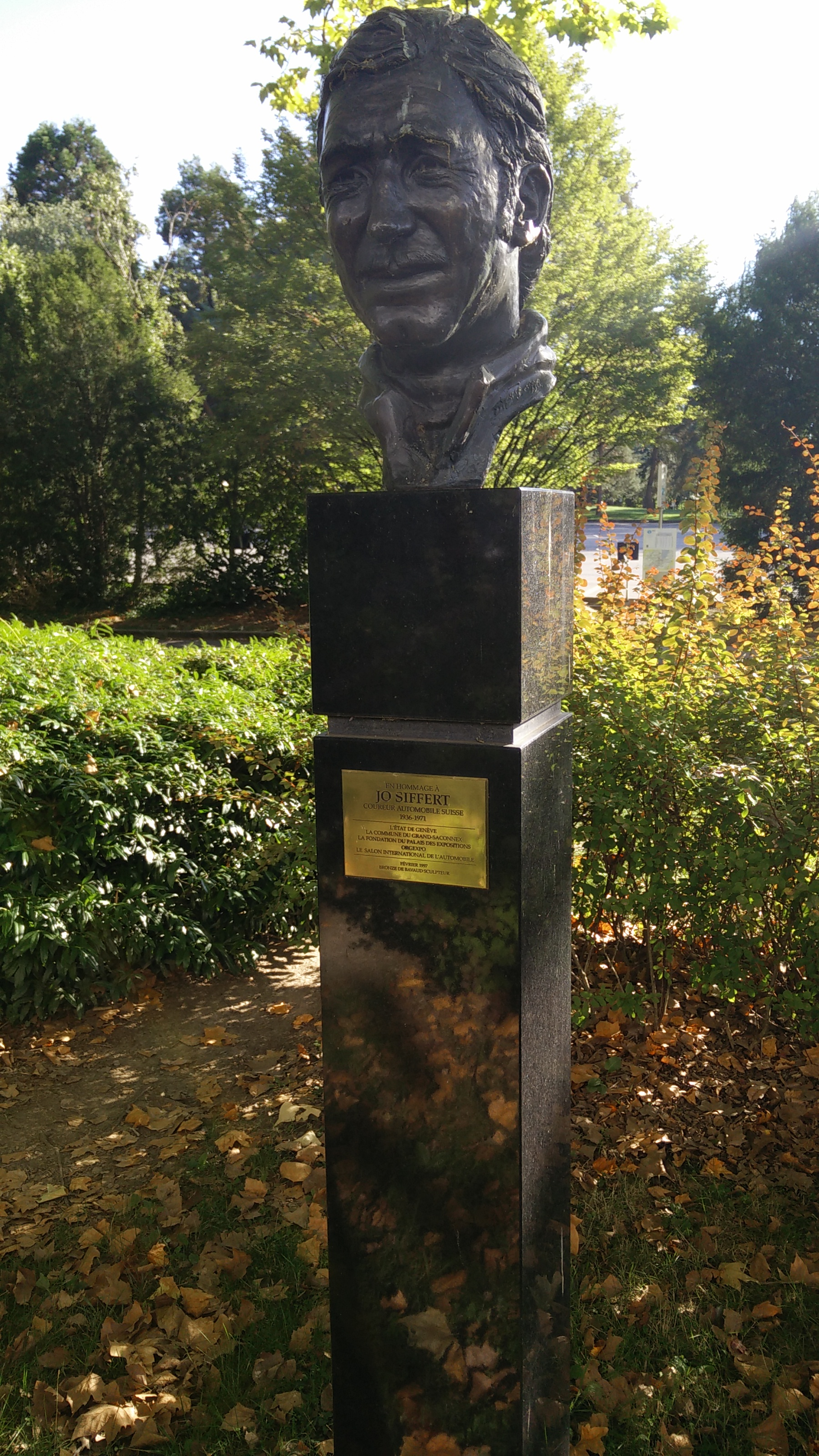
Jo Siffert memorial bust outside Palexpo complexe (Geneva Feb.1997)

== Racing record ==
=== Career summary ===
Season	Series	Team	Races	Wins	Poles	F/Laps	Podiums	Points	Position
1962	Formula One	Ecurie Filipinetti	3	0	0	0	0	0	NC
1963	Formula One	Siffert Racing Team	9	0	0	0	0	1	14th
1964	Formula One	Siffert Racing Team	8	0	0	0	0	7	10th
1964	Formula One	R.R.C. Walker Racing Team	2	0	0	0	1	7	10th
1964	Trophées de France	Siffert Racing Team	1	0	0	0	0	0	NC
1965	Formula One	R.R.C. Walker Racing Team	10	0	0	0	0	5	12th
1965	24 Hours of Le Mans	J.H. Simone	1	0	0	0	0	N/A	DNF
1966	Formula One	R.R.C. Walker Racing Team	8	0	0	0	0	3	14th
1966	British Formula Two	Joakim Bonnier	1	0	0	0	0	0	NC
1966	24 Hours of Le Mans	Porsche System Engineering	1	1	0	?	1	N/A	**1st**
1967	Formula One	Rob Walker/Jack Durlacher Racing Team	10	0	0	0	0	6	12th
1967	European Formula Two	BMW AG München	3	0	0	0	0	0	NC^{‡}
1967	24 Hours of Le Mans	Porsche System Engineering	1	1	0	?	1	N/A	**1st**
1968	Formula One	Rob Walker/Jack Durlacher Racing Team	12	1	1	3	1	12	7th
1968	European Formula Two	Bayerische Motoren Werke	2	0	0	0	0	0	NC^{‡}
1968	24 Hours of Le Mans	Porsche System Engineering	1	0	0	0	0	N/A	DNF
1968	24 Hours of Daytona	Porsche System Engineering	1	1	?	?	1	N/A	**1st**
1969	Formula One	Rob Walker/Jack Durlacher Racing Team	11	0	0	0	2	15	9th
1969	Can-Am	Porsche-Audi	8	0	0	0	1	56	4th
1969	European Formula Two	Bayerische Motoren Werke	3	0	1	0	1	0	NC^{‡}
1969	24 Hours of Le Mans	Hart Ski Racing	1	0	0	0	0	N/A	NC
1969	24 Hours of Daytona	Porsche System Engineering	1	0	0	0	0	N/A	NC
1970	Formula One	March Engineering	12	0	0	0	0	0	NC
1970	European Formula Two	Bayerische Motoren Werke	4	0	0	0	1	0	NC^{‡}
1970	Can-Am	J.W. Automotive	1	0	0	0	1	15	17th
1970	24 Hours of Le Mans	J.W. Automotive	1	0	0	0	0	N/A	DNF
1971	Formula One	Yardley Team BRM	11	1	1	1	2	19	5th
1971	Can-Am	STP-Jo Siffert	6	0	0	0	3	68	4th
1971	European Formula Two	Jo Siffert - Chevron Racing Team	2	0	0	0	0	0	NC^{‡}
1971	24 Hours of Le Mans	J.W. Automotive	1	0	0	0	0	N/A	DNF

^{‡} Graded drivers not eligible for European Formula Two Championship points

=== Complete Formula One World Championship results ===
(key) (Races in bold indicate pole position; races in italics indicate fastest lap)

Year	Entrant	Chassis	Engine	1	2	3	4	5	6	7	8	9	10	11	12	13	WDC	Pts
1962	Ecurie Nationale Suisse	Lotus 21	Climax FPF 1.5 L4	NED	MON; DNQ												NC	0
1962	Ecurie Filipinetti	Lotus 21	Climax FPF 1.5 L4			BEL; 10			GER; 12								NC	0
1962	Ecurie Filipinetti	Lotus 24	BRM P56 1.5 V8				FRA; Ret	GBR		ITA; DNQ	USA	RSA					NC	0
1963	Siffert Racing Team	Lotus 24	BRM P56 1.5 V8	MON; Ret	BEL; Ret	NED; 7	FRA; 6	GBR; Ret	GER; 9	ITA; Ret	USA; Ret	MEX; 9	RSA				14th	1
1964	Siffert Racing Team	Lotus 24	BRM P56 1.5 V8	MON; 8													10th	7
1964	Siffert Racing Team	Brabham BT11	BRM P56 1.5 V8		NED; 13	BEL; Ret	FRA; Ret	GBR; 11	GER; 4	AUT; Ret	ITA; 7						10th	7
1964	R.R.C. Walker Racing Team	Brabham BT11	BRM P56 1.5 V8									USA; 3	MEX; Ret				10th	7
1965	R.R.C. Walker Racing Team	Brabham BT11	BRM P56 1.5 V8	RSA; 7	MON; 6	BEL; 8	FRA; 6	GBR; 9	NED; 13	GER; Ret	ITA; Ret	USA; 11	MEX; 4				12th	5
1966	R.R.C. Walker Racing Team	Brabham BT11	BRM P60 2.0 V8	MON; Ret													14th	3
1966	R.R.C. Walker Racing Team	Cooper T81	Maserati 9/F1 3.0 V12		BEL; Ret	FRA; Ret	GBR; NC	NED; Ret	GER	ITA; Ret	USA; 4	MEX; Ret					14th	3
1967	Rob Walker/Jack Durlacher Racing Team	Cooper T81	Maserati 9/F1 3.0 V12	RSA; Ret	MON; Ret	NED; 10	BEL; 7	FRA; 4	GBR; Ret	GER; Ret	CAN; DNS	ITA; Ret	USA; 4	MEX; 12			12th	6
1968	Rob Walker/Jack Durlacher Racing Team	Cooper T81	Maserati 9/F1 3.0 V12	RSA; 7													7th	12
1968	Rob Walker/Jack Durlacher Racing Team	Lotus 49	Ford Cosworth DFV 3.0 V8		ESP; Ret	MON; Ret	BEL; 7	NED; Ret	FRA; 11								7th	12
1968	Rob Walker/Jack Durlacher Racing Team	Lotus 49B	Ford Cosworth DFV 3.0 V8							GBR; 1	GER; Ret	ITA; Ret	CAN; Ret	USA; 5	**MEX**; 6		7th	12
1969	Rob Walker/Jack Durlacher Racing Team	Lotus 49B	Ford Cosworth DFV 3.0 V8	RSA; 4	ESP; Ret	MON; 3	NED; 2	FRA; 9	GBR; 8	GER; 11^{1}	ITA; 8	CAN; Ret	USA; Ret	MEX; Ret			9th	15
1970	March Engineering	March 701	Ford Cosworth DFV 3.0 V8	RSA; 10	ESP; DNQ	MON; 8	BEL; 7	NED; Ret	FRA; Ret	GBR; Ret	GER; 8	AUT; 9	ITA; Ret	CAN; Ret	USA; 9	MEX; Ret	NC	0
1971	Yardley Team BRM	BRM P153	BRM P142 3.0 V12	RSA; Ret													5th	19
1971	Yardley Team BRM	BRM P160	BRM P142 3.0 V12		ESP; Ret	MON; Ret	NED; 6	FRA; 4	GBR; 9	GER; DSQ	**AUT**; 1	ITA; 9	CAN; 9	USA; 2			5th	19

Notes

- **^1** – Formula Two cars occupied fifth to tenth positions in the 1969 German Grand Prix, however drivers of these cars were not eligible for championship points. The points for fifth and sixth were awarded to the drivers of the eleventh and twelfth placed cars.

=== Complete Formula One Non-Championship results ===
(key) (Races in bold indicate pole position; races in italics indicate fastest lap)

Year	Entrant	Chassis	Engine	1	2	3	4	5	6	7	8	9	10	11	12	13	14	15	16	17	18	19	20
1962	Ecurie Nationale Suisse	Lotus 22	Ford 105E 1.5 L4	CAP	BRX; 6	LOM	LAV	GLV															
1962	Ecurie Nationale Suisse	Lotus 21	Climax FPF 1.5 L4						PAU; 7	AIN	INT	NAP	MAL	CLP									
1962	Scuderia Filipinetti	Lotus 21	Climax FPF 1.5 L4												RMS; 9			MED; 4	DAN	OUL	MEX	RAN	NAT
1962	Scuderia Filipinetti	Lotus 24	BRM P56 1.5 V8													SOL; Ret	KAN						
1963	Ecurie Filipinetti	Lotus 24	BRM P56 1.5 V8	LOM; DNS	GLV	PAU; Ret	IMO; 2	**SYR**; 1	AIN	INT													
1963	Siffert Racing Team	Lotus 24	BRM P56 1.5 V8								ROM; DNS	SOL; Ret	KAN	MED; 5	AUT; Ret	OUL; 11	RAN						
1964	Siffert Racing Team	Lotus 24	BRM P56 1.5 V8	DMT	NWT	SYR; DNS	AIN	INT; 11															
1964	Siffert Racing Team	Brabham BT11	BRM P56 1.5 V8						SOL; 7	**MED**; 1	RAN												
1965	R.R.C. Walker Racing Team	Brabham BT11	BRM P56 1.5 V8	ROC; 6	SYR; Ret	SMT; Ret	INT	MED; 1	RAN; 5														
1966	R.R.C. Walker Racing Team	Brabham BT11	BRM P56 1.5 V8	RSA; 2																			
1966	R.R.C. Walker Racing Team	Cooper T81	Maserati 9/F1 3.0 V12		SYR; Ret																		
1966	R.R.C. Walker Racing Team	Cooper T80	Maserati 9/F1 3.0 V12			INT; Ret	OUL																
1967	Rob Walker/Jack Durlacher Racing Team	Cooper T81	Maserati 9/F1 3.0 V12	ROC; 3	SPC	INT; 3	SYR; 3	OUL															
1967	BMW	Lola T100	BMW M12 2.0 L4						ESP; Ret														
1968	Rob Walker/Jack Durlacher Racing Team	Lotus 49	Ford Cosworth DFV 3.0 V8	ROC; DNS	INT; Ret	OUL																	
1969	Rob Walker/Jack Durlacher Racing Team	Lotus 49B	Ford Cosworth DFV 3.0 V8	ROC; 4	INT; 11	MAD	OUL																
1971	Jo Siffert Automobiles	March 701	Ford Cosworth DFV 3.0 V8	ARG; Ret	ROC																		
1971	Yardley Team BRM	BRM P160	BRM P142 3.0 V12			QUE; 6		INT; Ret	RIN	OUL	**VIC**; 4												
1971	Yardley Team BRM	BRM P153	BRM P142 3.0 V12				SPR; Ret																

=== Complete 24 Hours of Le Mans results ===
Year	Team	Co-Drivers	Car	Class	Laps	Pos.	Class Pos.
1965	(France) J.H. Simone	(Germany) Jochen Neerpasch	Maserati Tipo 65	P +5.0	3	DNF	DNF
1966	(West Germany) Porsche System Engineering	(United Kingdom) Colin Davis	Porsche 906/6L Carrera 6	P 2.0	339	4th	**1st**
1967	(West Germany) Porsche System Engineering	(West Germany) Hans Herrmann	Porsche 907/6L	P 2.0	358	5th	**1st**
1968	(West Germany) Porsche System Engineering	(West Germany) Hans Herrmann	Porsche 908	P 3.0	59	DNF	DNF
1969	(Switzerland) Hart Ski Racing	(United Kingdom) Brian Redman	Porsche 908/2L	P 3.0	60	DNF	DNF
1970	(United Kingdom) John Wyer Automotive Engineering Ltd.	(United Kingdom) Brian Redman	Porsche 917K	S 5.0	156	DNF	DNF
1971	(United Kingdom) John Wyer Automotive Engineering Ltd.	(United Kingdom) Derek Bell	Porsche 917LH	S 5.0		DNF	DNF

=== Complete European Formula Two Championship results ===
(key) (Races in bold indicate pole position; races in italics indicate fastest lap)

Year	Entrant	Chassis	Engine	1	2	3	4	5	6	7	8	9	10	11	Pos.	Pts
1967	BMW	Lola T100	BMW M11	SNE	SIL; Ret	NÜR; Ret	HOC	TUL	JAR	ZAN	PER	BRH	VAL; 9		NC	0
1968	BMW	Lola T102	BMW M11	HOC	THR	JAR	PAL	TUL	ZAN	PER	HOC; Ret	VAL; 18			NC	0
1969	BMW	Lola T102	BMW M11	THR; Ret	HOC	**NÜR**; 2	JAR	TUL							NC	0^{‡}
1969	BMW	BMW 269	BMW M11						PER; Ret	VAL					NC	0^{‡}
1970	BMW	BMW 270	BMW M11	THR; Ret	HOC	BAR	ROU; 1	PER; 2	TUL; 11	IMO; Ret	HOC				NC	0^{‡}
1971	Jo Siffert - Chevron Racing Team	Chevron B18	Cosworth FVA	HOC	THR; Ret	NÜR; 10	JAR	PAL; DNQ	ROU	MAN	TUL	ALB	VAL	VAL	NC	0

^{‡} Graded drivers not eligible for European Formula Two Championship points

=== Complete World Sportscar Championship results ===
- Dagger = Won class

Year	Entrant	Chassis	Engine	Class	1	2	3	4	5	6	7	8	9	10	11	12	13	14	15
1961	Robert Jenny	Ferrari 500 TRC	Ferrari Straight-4	S 2.0	SEB	TGA	NÜR; 6	LMS	PES										
1963	Scuderia Filipinetti	Ferrari 250 GTO	Ferrari V12	GTIII (3.0)	DAY	SEB	TGA	SPA; Ret	NÜR; 3	MZ1	CON	WIE	CLF	SLD	RTT				
1963	Jo Siffert	Lotus	BRM	GTIII (3.0)												OLV; NC	MZ2	TDF	BHP
1964	Team Schiller	Porsche 904	Porsche Flat-4	GTII (2.0)	DAY	SEB	TGA	SPA	NÜR; 8	LMS	RMS; Ret	SLD	ENN	CRA	MZA	BH1	BH2	MLY	
1964	Shelby American	Shelby Cobra	Ford V8	GTIII (3.0)	DAY	SEB	TGA	SPA	NÜR	LMS	RMS	SLD; 23	TTR	CRA	BHP				
1964	Maranello Concessionaires	Ferrari 250 GTO	Ferrari V12	GTIII (3.0)	DAY	SEB	TGA	SPA	NÜR	LMS	RMS					TDF; DSQ			
1965	J. Simone	Maserati Tipo 65	Maserati V8	P+5.0	DAY	SEB	MZA	TTR	TGA	SPA	NÜR	LMS; Ret	RMS	BHP					
1966	Charles Vögele	Porsche 906	Porsche Flat-6	IMC	DAY	SEB; 6	MZA; 5	TGA	SPA	NÜR; Ret		HOC							
1966	Porsche System	Porsche 906	Porsche Flat-6	IMC							LMS; 4†								
1966	Charles Vögele	Porsche 906	Porsche Flat-6	ISCC S1	SEB	TGA	NÜ1	MUG; Ret	ENN	CRA	NÜ2								
1966	Porsche System	Porsche 906	Porsche Flat-6	ISCC S1								ZEL; 2							
1967	Porsche System	Porsche 910	Porsche Flat-6	P+2.0	DAY; 4†	SEB; 4†	MZA; 5	SPA; 2†	TGA; 5	NÜ1; Ret		MUG; 59	BRH; 3	ENN	NÜ2				
1967	Porsche System	Porsche 907 LH	Porsche Flat-6	P+2.0							LMS; Ret								
1968	Porsche System	Porsche 907 LH	Porsche Flat-8	P	DAY; Ret														
1968	Porsche System	Porsche 907	Porsche Flat-8	P		SEB; Ret	BRH; 1		TGA; 18										
1968	Porsche System	Porsche 908/01	Porsche Flat-8	P				MZA; Ret		**NÜR**; 1	SPA	WGN; Ret	**ZEL**; 1	**LMS**; Ret					
1969	Porsche System	Porsche 908 LH	Porsche Flat-8	P 3.0	DAY; Ret			MZA; 1		SPA; 1									
1969	Porsche System	Porsche 908/02K	Porsche Flat-8	P 3.0		SEB; Ret	**BRH**; 1		TGA		**NÜR**; 1		**WGN**; 1						
1969	Porsche System	Porsche 908/02 LH	Porsche Flat-8	P 3.0								LMS; Ret							
1969	Porsche System	Porsche 917	Porsche Flat-12	S 5.0										ÖST; 1					
1970	John Wyer Automotive Engineering	Porsche 917K	Porsche Flat-12	S 5.0	DAY; 2	SEB; 4	BRH; Ret	**MZA**; 12		SPA; 1		LMS; Ret	**WGN**; 2	ÖST; 1					
1970	John Wyer Automotive Engineering	Porsche 908/03	Porsche Flat-8	P 3.0					**TGA**; 1		**NÜR**; Ret								
1971	John Wyer Automotive Engineering	Porsche 917K	Porsche Flat-12	S 5.0	BUE; 1	DAY; Ret	SEB; 5	BRH; 3	MZA; 2	SPA; 2				ÖST; Ret	WGN; 2				
1971	John Wyer Automotive Engineering	Porsche 908/03	Porsche Flat-8	P 3.0							TGA; Ret	NÜR; 2							
1971	John Wyer Automotive Engineering	Porsche 917LH	Porsche Flat-12	S 5.0									LMS; Ret						

== Other results ==
- Targa Florio: 1st, 1970
- Coppa Cittá di Enna: 1st, 1968
- 12 hours of Sebring: 1st, 1968
- 24 hours of Daytona: 1st, 1968
- 1000 km of Nürburgring: 1st, 1968, 1969
- 1000 km of Spa-Francorchamps: 1st, 1969, 1970
- 1000 km of Zeltweg: 1st, 1968, 1969, 1970
- 1000 km of Monza: 1st, 1969
- 1000 km of Buenos Aires: 1st, 1971
- 6 Hours of Watkins Glen: 1st, 1969
- 1000 km of Brands Hatch: 1st, 1968

== Sources ==
- Lareida, Men (director) (2005). Jo Siffert. Live Fast, Die Young (DVD). Hugofilm.

F1 Results include information from the following sources:

- Whitelock, Mark (2006). 1½-litre Grand Prix Racing 1961-1965. Veloce Publishing Ltd. ISBN 184584016X.
- "The Formula One Archives".
- "F2 Register - The Formula 1, Non-Championship Races". Archived from the original on 11 October 2007.

Preceded by Jochen Rindt	Formula One fatal accidents 24 October 1971	Succeeded by Roger Williamson
