= T80 (disambiguation) =

The T-80 is a main battle tank designed in the Soviet Union.

T80 or T-80 may also refer to:

== Automobiles ==
- Cooper T80, a British Formula One racing car
- Lola T80, a British Indycar racing car
- Mercedes-Benz T80, a vehicle designed to break the world land speed record
- Tatra T80, a Czechoslovak luxury car
- Toyota Corona (T80), a Japanese automobile
- Yema T80, a Chinese crossover

== Other uses ==
- Canon T80, a film camera
- Pir Panjal Railway Tunnel, also known as T-80.
- T-80 light tank, a variant of the Soviet T-70 tank
- T80, a bus service using the Liverpool–Parramatta T-way in Sydney, Australia
