= Formula One drivers from New Zealand =

List of Formula One drivers who competed as New Zealanders

- Drivers: 10
- Grands Prix: 271
- Entries: 457
- Starts: 428
- Best season finish: 1st (1967)
- Wins: 12
- Podiums: 71
- Pole positions: 6
- Fastest laps: 15
- Points: 674.5
- First entry: 1958 German Grand Prix (Bruce McLaren)
- First win: 1959 United States Grand Prix (McLaren)
- Latest win: 1974 Argentine Grand Prix (Denny Hulme)
- Latest entry: 2026 Las Vegas Grand Prix (Liam Lawson)
- 2026 drivers: Liam Lawson

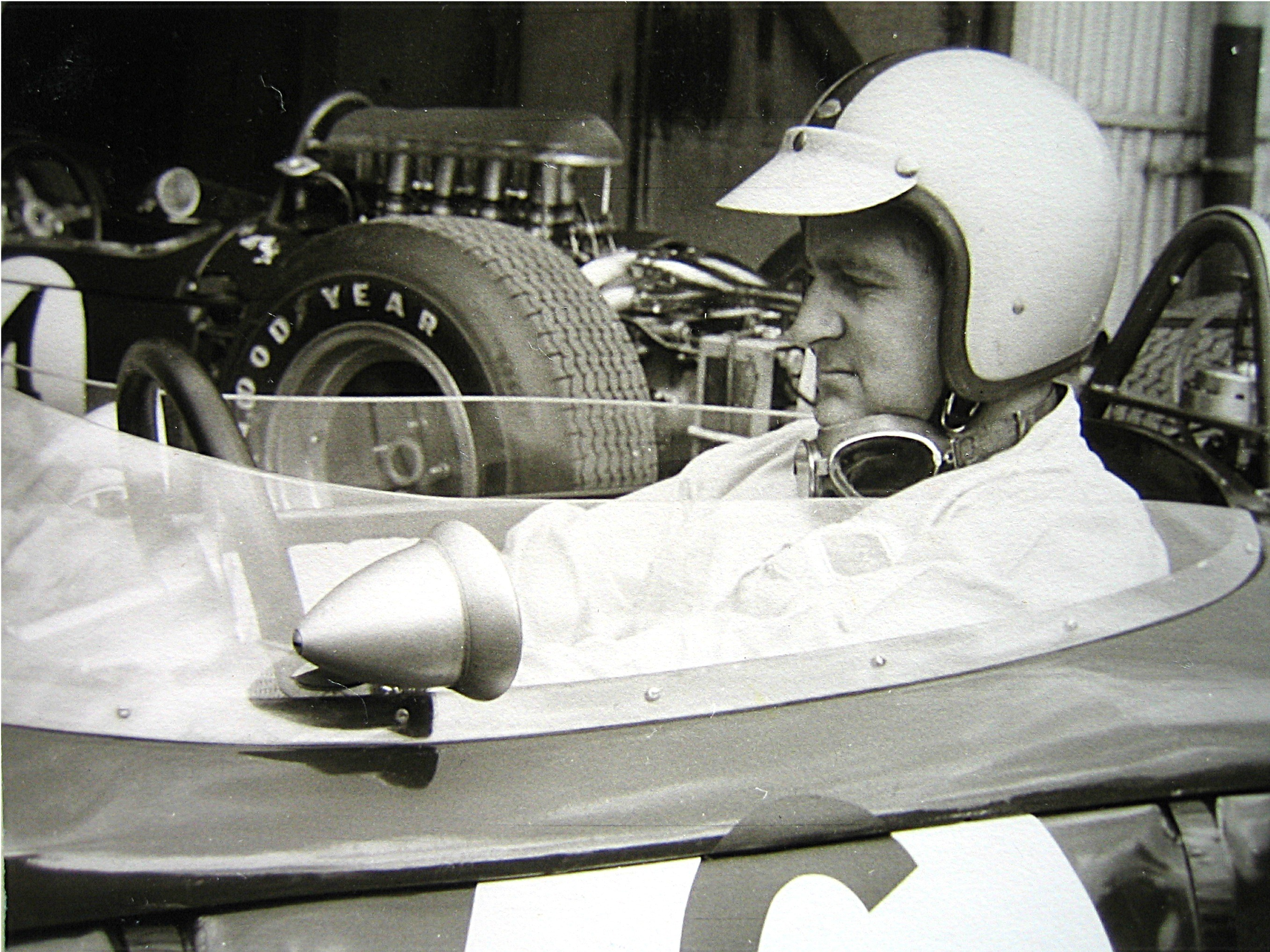
Denny Hulme in 1965

There have been ten Formula One drivers from New Zealand, with four of them having started two or fewer races. The late 1950s to mid-1970s is viewed as the "golden age" for New Zealand in the sport and saw Denny Hulme crowned as World Drivers' Championship in 1967. New Zealand drivers were absent from Formula One events from 1984 (when Mike Thackwell last raced) to 2017 (when Brendon Hartley made his debut in the 2017 United States Grand Prix).

== Current drivers ==
Liam Lawson entered the 2023 Dutch Grand Prix racing for Scuderia AlphaTauri, replacing Daniel Ricciardo after Ricciardo sustained a broken hand during a crash in free practice. At the 2023 Singapore Grand Prix, Lawson qualified a career-best tenth place and finished the race in ninth, scoring points for the first time in Formula One as well as becoming the second AlphaTauri driver that year to score. After the 2024 Singapore Grand Prix it was announced Liam Lawson would race for RB Formula One Team for the remainder of the 2024 season, replacing Daniel Ricciardo. Lawson was promoted to Red Bull Racing ahead of the 2025 season, but was demoted back to Racing Bulls after two races.

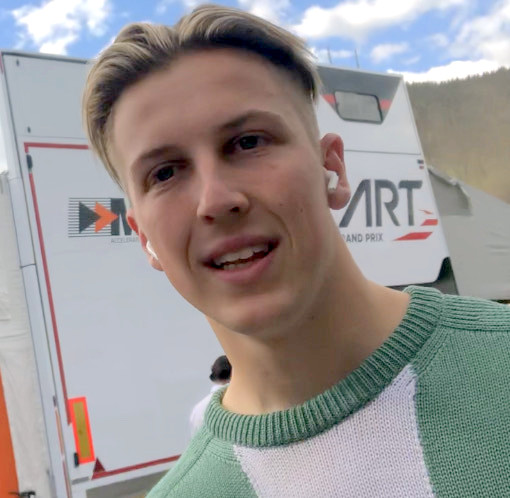
Liam Lawson
2026 season position: 9th

== Former drivers ==
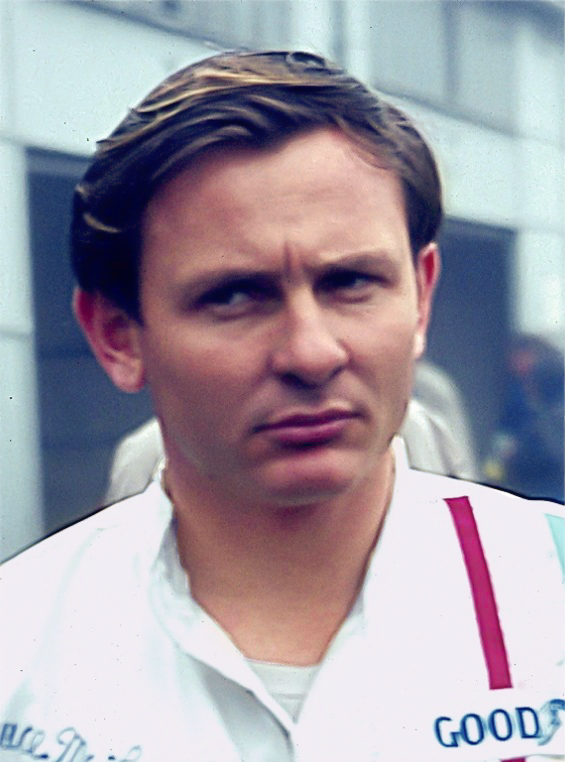
Bruce McLaren in 1966

Ten drivers from New Zealand have raced in Formula One. The late 1950s to mid-1970s is seen as the "golden age" for the country's participation in the sport and saw their only real racing successes. It was during that era that seven of the drivers competed. In 1970 British driver Stirling Moss said "In terms of its population, New Zealand's contribution to the top echelons of motorsport far outweighs that of any other country."

Bruce McLaren drove for Cooper from 1958 until the end of 1965, winning three races for the team. He had his most successful season in 1960 when he finished second in the Drivers' Championship to teammate Jack Brabham, having stood on the podium six times out of the eight races. In 1964 he formed his own team, McLaren, in partnership with Teddy Mayer. The outfit has since become one of the most successful Formula One teams in the sport's history, though its 1966 debut did not immediately make that seem likely. Bruce kept racing with his own team, winning the 1968 Belgian Grand Prix and finishing an overall fifth in the championship. Though further wins eluded him he was able to produce a consistent season in 1969 and ended the year third in the title race. McLaren was killed while testing one of his cars at Goodwood.

Denny Hulme established himself as a racing driver in Europe with the help of Bruce McLaren. Hulme became a mechanic for Brabham in order to help fund his career and was rewarded with a drive in 1965. He impressed enough to be retained for the following season and finished on the podium at all four of the races he completed. He doubled that tally in 1967, finishing on the podium eight times including two race wins. That year he won the championship title ahead of Jack Brabham. For the 1968 season Hulme moved to McLaren where he would stay for the remainder of his career. He finished third overall and would do so again in 1972. Hulme won six races for McLaren before retiring from Formula One at the end of 1974. Hulme holds the distinction of being the world champion with the fewest pole positions, only qualifying in first position once.

Chris Amon drove for 13 different teams during a career that spanned 14 seasons. He made his debut for Lola at the 1963 Monaco Grand Prix but his career only really took off in 1967 when he drove for Ferrari. In that year he stood on the third step of the podium four times and he eventually finished the year in fifth place in the championship. He went one better the following year and went on to win a race with March in 1970, though the BRDC International Trophy was not included in the official championship. He secured other podium finishes for March and Matra but, after 96 starts and 11 podium finishes, Amon retired in 1976 without a race win.

Howden Ganley made his debut with BRM after racing in Formula 5000. In both 1971 and 1972 he finished six of the eleven races, including fourth places in each year. He moved to Iso–Marlboro for the 1973 season but the uncompetitive car meant that he was unable to finish above sixth. He drove for March for two races in 1974 and then twice failed to qualify in a Maki. He retired from Formula One and later went on to form the Tiga racing car manufacturer alongside Tim Schenken.

Mike Thackwell, at the time of his first race in 1980, was the youngest driver to ever take part in a Grand Prix. He was entered for three races that year but only started the 1980 Canadian Grand Prix and was unable to see the chequered flag. After several years in other racing disciplines he made a brief comeback in 1984 but did not finish a race.

Tony Shelly entered three races with Lotus in 1962. He only started one Grand Prix and did not make it to the end of the race.

Graham McRae started the 1973 British Grand Prix, his only race in Formula One, but his Iso–Marlboro failed before he finished the first lap. John Nicholson was entered for the 1974 British Grand Prix but did not start. The following year he again entered the British Grand Prix, eventually finishing in 17th place. He did not go on to compete in any other races.

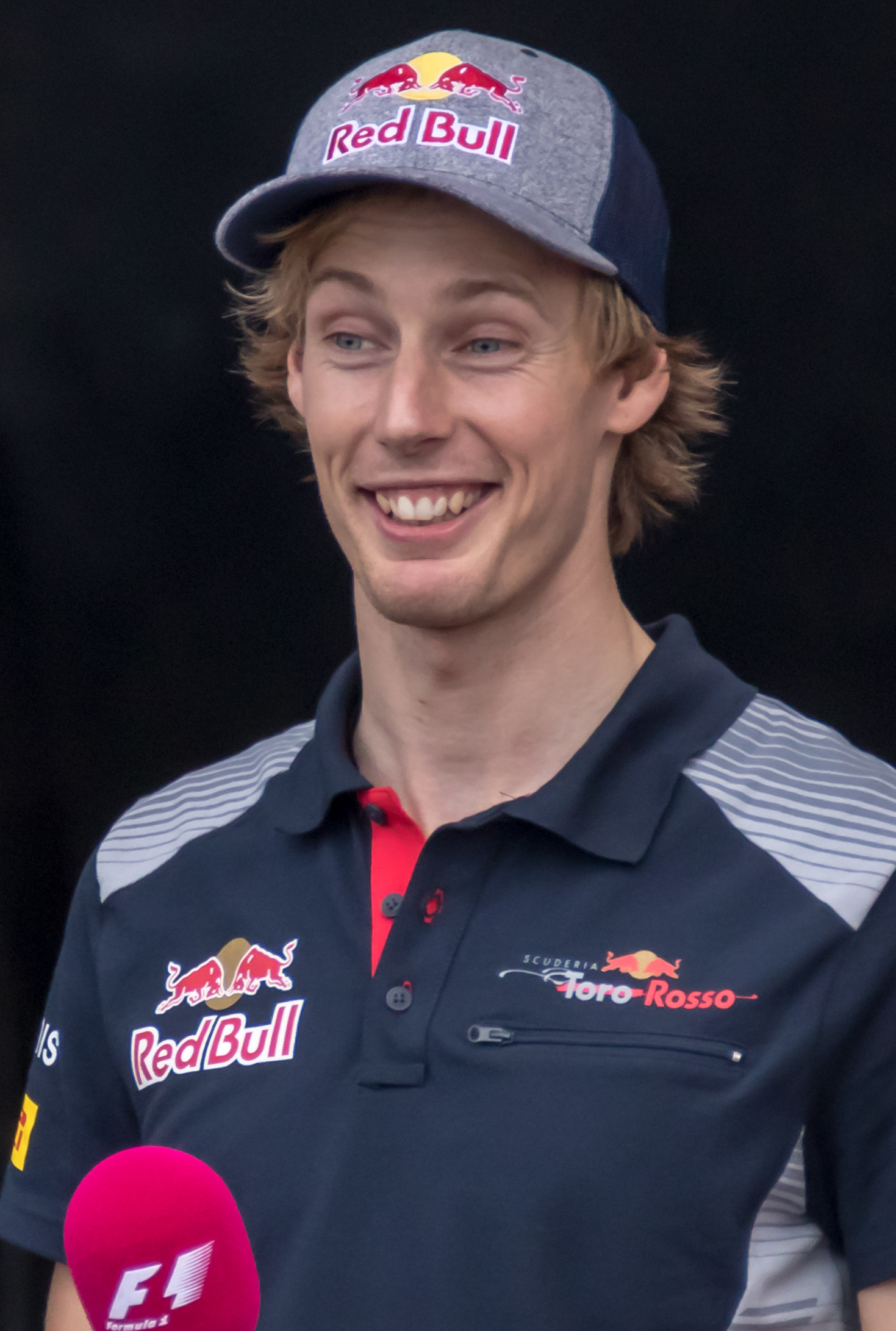
Brendon Hartley in 2017

Brendon Hartley made his debut at the 2017 United States Grand Prix for Scuderia Toro Rosso, substituting for Pierre Gasly. He remained the Toro Rosso driver for the rest of the 2017 season and then drove for the team in the 2018 season as well.

== Statistics ==
Drivers	Active Years	Entries	Wins	Podiums	Career Points	Poles	Fastest Laps	Championships
Bruce McLaren	1958–1970	104 (100 starts)	4	27	188.5 (196.5)	0	3	-
Tony Shelly	1962	3 (1 start)	0	0	0	0	0	-
Chris Amon	1963–1976	108 (96 starts)	0	11	83	5	3	-
Denny Hulme	1965–1974	112	8	33	248	1	9	1 (1967)
Howden Ganley	1971–1974	41 (35 starts)	0	0	10	0	0	-
Graham McRae	1973	1	0	0	0	0	0	-
John Nicholson	1974–1975	2 (1 start)	0	0	0	0	0	-
Mike Thackwell	1980, 1984	5 (2 starts)	0	0	0	0	0	-
Brendon Hartley	2017–2018	25	0	0	4	0	0	-
Liam Lawson	2023–2026	56	0	0	133	0	0	-

== See also ==
- List of Formula One Grand Prix winners
