= Cooper T81 =

Formula One racing car

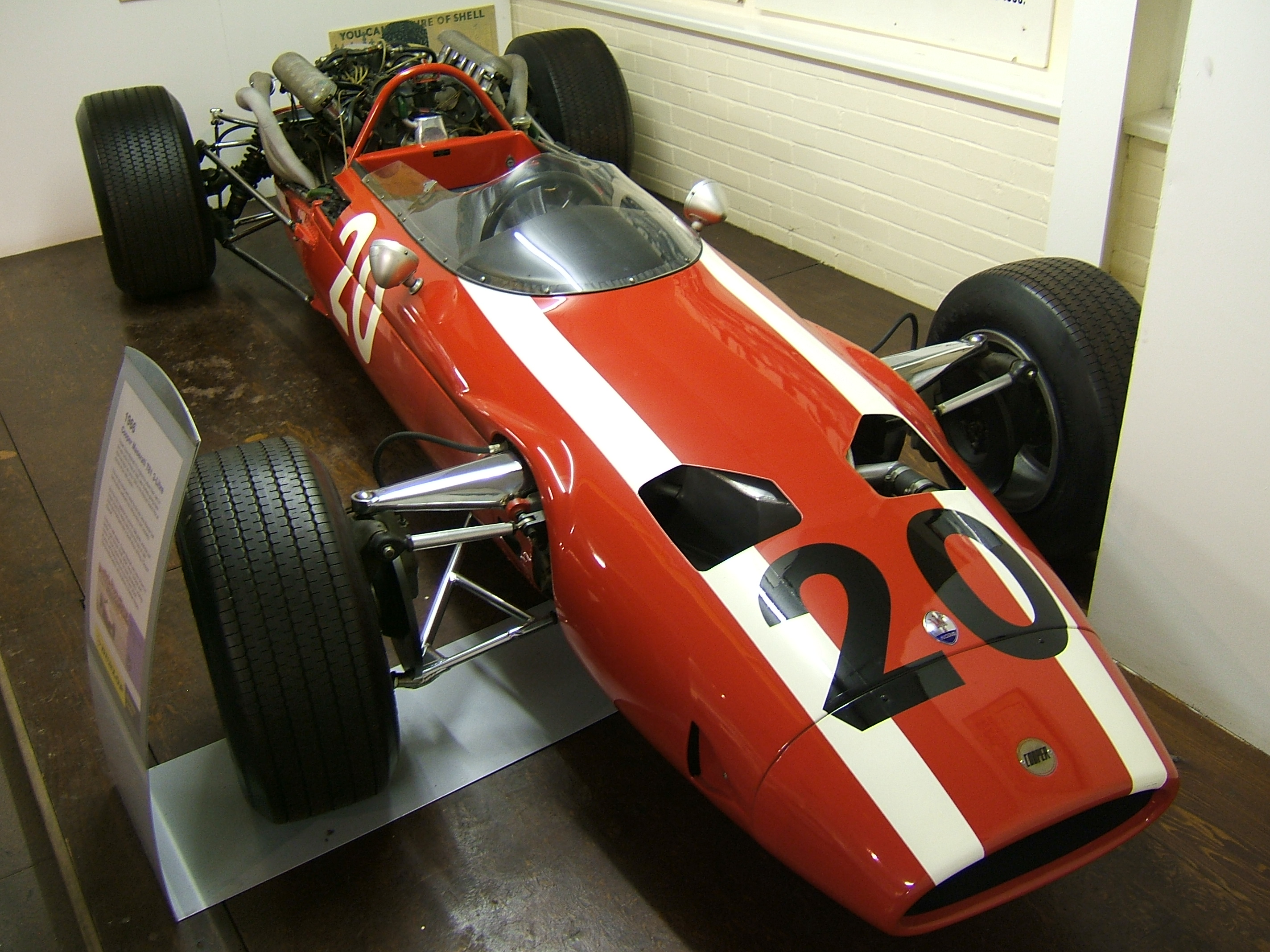
- Jo Bonnier's Cooper T81, in the colours of his Anglo-Suisse Racing team
- Category: Formula One
- Constructor: Cooper Car Company
- Designer: Derrick White
- Predecessor: Cooper T77/Cooper T80
- Successor: Cooper T86

Technical specifications
- Chassis: Aluminium monocoque
- Suspension (front): lower wishbones, upper rocker arms, inboard coil springs over dampers
- Suspension (rear): top links, reversed lower wishbones, twin radius arms, coil springs over dampers
- Axle track: F: 1,495 mm (58.9 in); R: 1,455 mm (57.3 in)
- Wheelbase: 2,490 mm (98.0 in)
- Engine: Maserati 2989cc V12 naturally aspirated Mid-engined, longitudinally mounted
- Transmission: T81: ZF 5DS25; T81B: Hewland DG300 5-speed manual gearbox,
- Fuel: BP
- Tyres: (Works team) Dunlop (1966), Firestone (1966/7)

Competition history
- Notable entrants: Cooper Car Company, R.R.C. Walker Racing Team
- Notable drivers: (New Zealand) Chris Amon, (Sweden) Jo Bonnier, (United States) Richie Ginther, (Austria) Jochen Rindt, (Mexico) Pedro Rodríguez, (Switzerland) Jo Siffert, (United Kingdom) John Surtees, (Belgium) Jacky Ickx
- Debut: 1966 Syracuse Grand Prix
Races	Wins	Poles	F/Laps
21	2	1	2
- Constructors' Championships: 0
- Drivers' Championships: 0

The Cooper T81 is a Formula One car produced by the Cooper Car Company for the 1966 Formula One season. It represented something of a comeback for Cooper's fortunes, winning two races and enabling Cooper to finish third in the Constructors' Championship in 1966 and 1967.

== Development ==
The T81 was designed ahead of the 1966 World Championship season to operate within the new 3 litre engine regulations that came into effect that year. It would be powered by Maserati's Tipo 9 2.5-litre V12 engines which had been bored out to 3 litres. These were supplied by the Chipstead Group, Maserati's UK distributors, who had taken control of Cooper in April 1965. Cooper had tested the engine in the interim T80 model.

In many ways the T81 was a typical example of its time, with a rear engine, front radiator, inboard front suspension and a monocoque chassis. In fact the car was Cooper's first monocoque chassis, although by this time such an arrangement had already become standard in Formula 1, having been pioneered by the Lotus 25 four years earlier. The T81 made its race debut in the 1966 Syracuse Grand Prix.

Strenuous efforts were made to save weight for the 1967 season; this lighter car was dubbed the T81B.

== Race history ==
The T81 debuted at the non-championship 1966 Syracuse Grand Prix. The works team was not present but Rob Walker entered a car for Jo Siffert and Guy Ligier entered his own car. Siffert qualified third but retired with a broken universal joint, while Ligier qualified fifth and finished sixth and last.

The World Championship debut was at the 1966 Monaco Grand Prix. Jochen Rindt and Richie Ginther were the works drivers, qualifying in seventh and ninth position respectively. Both retired with mechanical problems. Guy Ligier and Jo Bonnier were also present and finished the race but were unclassified.

With up to three works entries, and three privateer cars, there were suggestions that Cooper were overstretching themselves and that as a result the preparation of the cars was suffering. However John Surtees, who had replaced Ginther after walking out on Ferrari, took the car's first win in the final race of the 1966 season in Mexico, and in turn Surtees's replacement, Pedro Rodríguez, won the very next race, the 1967 season opener in South Africa. The T81B variant was first raced by Rindt at the 1967 Monaco Grand Prix.

Cooper finished third in the Constructors' Championship in 1966 and 1967, their highest placing since 1962, but it would be their last flourish.

The T81's last race came at the start of the 1968 season in South Africa in the hands of privateers Jo Siffert and Jo Bonnier, as by this time the works team had moved on to the T86 chassis. As it happened, Cooper folded at the end of the 1968 season, making the T81 the last Cooper to win a World Championship Grand Prix.

In all the T81 (and T81B) was entered a total of 85 times in its 21 race lifespan, achieving 2 wins, 1 pole position, 6 podiums, and 23 points finishes, earning 74 points in total.

== Complete Formula One World Championship results ==
Year	Entrant	Engine	Tyres	Driver	1	2	3	4	5	6	7	8	9	10	11	12	Points	WCC
1966	Cooper Car Company	Maserati V12	D		MON	BEL	FRA	GBR	NED	GER	ITA	USA	MEX				30 (35)	3rd
1966	Cooper Car Company	Maserati V12	D	Jochen Rindt	Ret	2	4	5	Ret	3	4	2	Ret				30 (35)	3rd
1966	Cooper Car Company	Maserati V12	D	Richie Ginther	Ret	5											30 (35)	3rd
1966	Cooper Car Company	Maserati V12	D	Chris Amon			8										30 (35)	3rd
1966	Cooper Car Company	Maserati V12	D	John Surtees			Ret	Ret	Ret	2	Ret	3	1				30 (35)	3rd
1966	Cooper Car Company	Maserati V12	D	Moisés Solana									Ret				30 (35)	3rd
1966	R.R.C. Walker Racing Team	Maserati V12	D	Jo Siffert		Ret	Ret	NC	Ret		Ret	4	Ret				30 (35)	3rd
1966	Guy Ligier	Maserati V12	D	Guy Ligier	NC	NC	NC	10	9	DNS							30 (35)	3rd
1966	Anglo-Suisse Racing Team	Maserati V12	F	Jo Bonnier	NC	Ret			7	Ret	Ret	NC	6				30 (35)	3rd
1967	Cooper Car Company	Maserati V12	F		RSA	MON	NED	BEL	FRA	GBR	GER	CAN	ITA	USA	MEX		28	3rd
1967	Cooper Car Company	Maserati V12	F	Pedro Rodríguez	1	5	Ret	9	6	5	11				6		28	3rd
1967	Cooper Car Company	Maserati V12	F	Jochen Rindt	Ret	Ret	Ret	4	Ret			Ret		Ret			28	3rd
1967	Cooper Car Company	Maserati V12	F	Alan Rees						9							28	3rd
1967	Cooper Car Company	Maserati V12	F	Richard Attwood								10					28	3rd
1967	Cooper Car Company	Maserati V12	F	Jacky Ickx									6				28	3rd
1967	Rob Walker Racing Team	Maserati V12	F	Jo Siffert	Ret	Ret	10	7	4	Ret	Ret	DNS	Ret	4	12		28	3rd
1967	Joakim Bonnier Racing Team	Maserati V12	F	Jo Bonnier	Ret			Ret		Ret	6	8	Ret	6	10		28	3rd
1967	Guy Ligier	Maserati V12	F	Guy Ligier				10	NC								28	3rd
1968	Cooper Car Company	Maserati V12	F		RSA	ESP	MON	BEL	NED	FRA	GBR	GER	ITA	CAN	USA	MEX	0	NC
1968	Cooper Car Company	Maserati V12	F	Brian Redman	Ret												0	NC
1968	Rob Walker Racing Team	Maserati V12	F	Jo Siffert	7												0	NC
1968	Joakim Bonnier Racing Team	Maserati V12	F	Jo Bonnier	Ret												0	NC
