= Bruce McLaren =

New Zealand racing driver and motorsport executive (1937–1970)

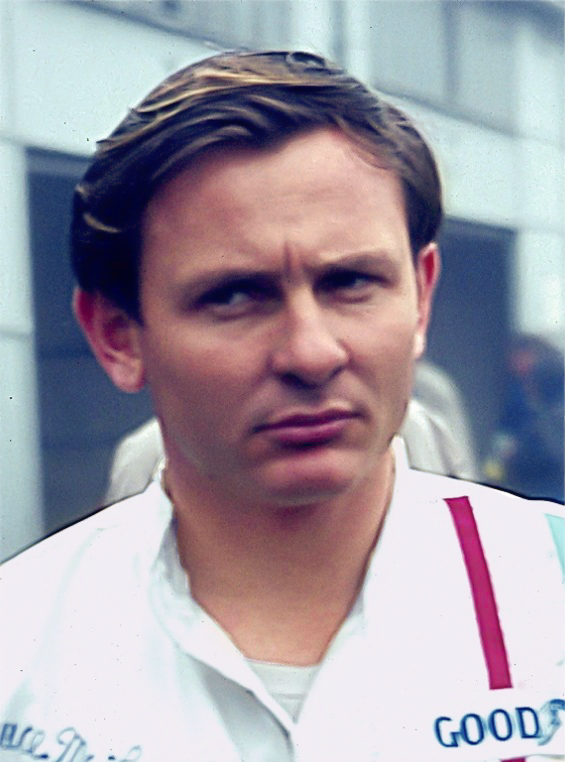
- McLaren in 1966
- Born: Bruce Leslie McLaren; 30 August 1937; Auckland, New Zealand
- Died: 2 June 1970 (aged 32); Goodwood Circuit, Sussex, England
- Spouse: Patricia Broad (m. 1961)
- Children: 1

Formula One World Championship career
- Nationality: (New Zealand) New Zealander
- Active years: 1958–1970
- Team(s): Cooper (1958–1965); Eagle (1967); McLaren (1966–1970)
- Entries: 104 (100 starts)
- Championships: 0
- Wins: 4
- Podiums: 27
- Career points: 188.5 (196.5) (Note: Up until 1990, not all points scored by a driver contributed to their final World Championship tally (see list of points scoring systems for more information). Numbers without parentheses are Championship points; numbers in parentheses are total points scored.)
- Pole positions: 0
- Fastest laps: 3
- First entry: 1958 German Grand Prix
- First win: 1959 United States Grand Prix
- Last win: 1968 Belgian Grand Prix
- Last entry: 1970 Monaco Grand Prix

24 Hours of Le Mans career
- Years: 1959, 1961–1967, 1969
- Teams: Cooper Car Company, Maserati, Aston Martin, Ford, Shelby, McLaren
- Best finish: 1st (1966)
- Class wins: 1 (1966)

Bruce Leslie McLaren (30 August 1937 – 2 June 1970) was a New Zealand racing driver, automotive designer, engineer, and motorsport executive who competed in Formula One from 1958 to 1970. He won four Grands Prix across 13 seasons and was runner-up in the 1960 Formula One World Drivers' Championship with Cooper. He won the 1966 24 Hours of Le Mans with Chris Amon in a Ford GT40 and won the Canadian-American Challenge Cup in 1967 and 1969.

In 1963, McLaren founded Bruce McLaren Motor Racing, winning the team's first Formula One race at the 1968 Belgian Grand Prix. He became one of only three drivers, alongside Jack Brabham and Dan Gurney, to win a World Championship race in a car of their own construction. The team he founded has since won ten World Constructors' Championships and remains one of the most successful constructors in the history of the sport. McLaren was killed on 2 June 1970 while testing the McLaren M8D at Goodwood Circuit in Sussex, England. He was 32 years old.

== Early life ==
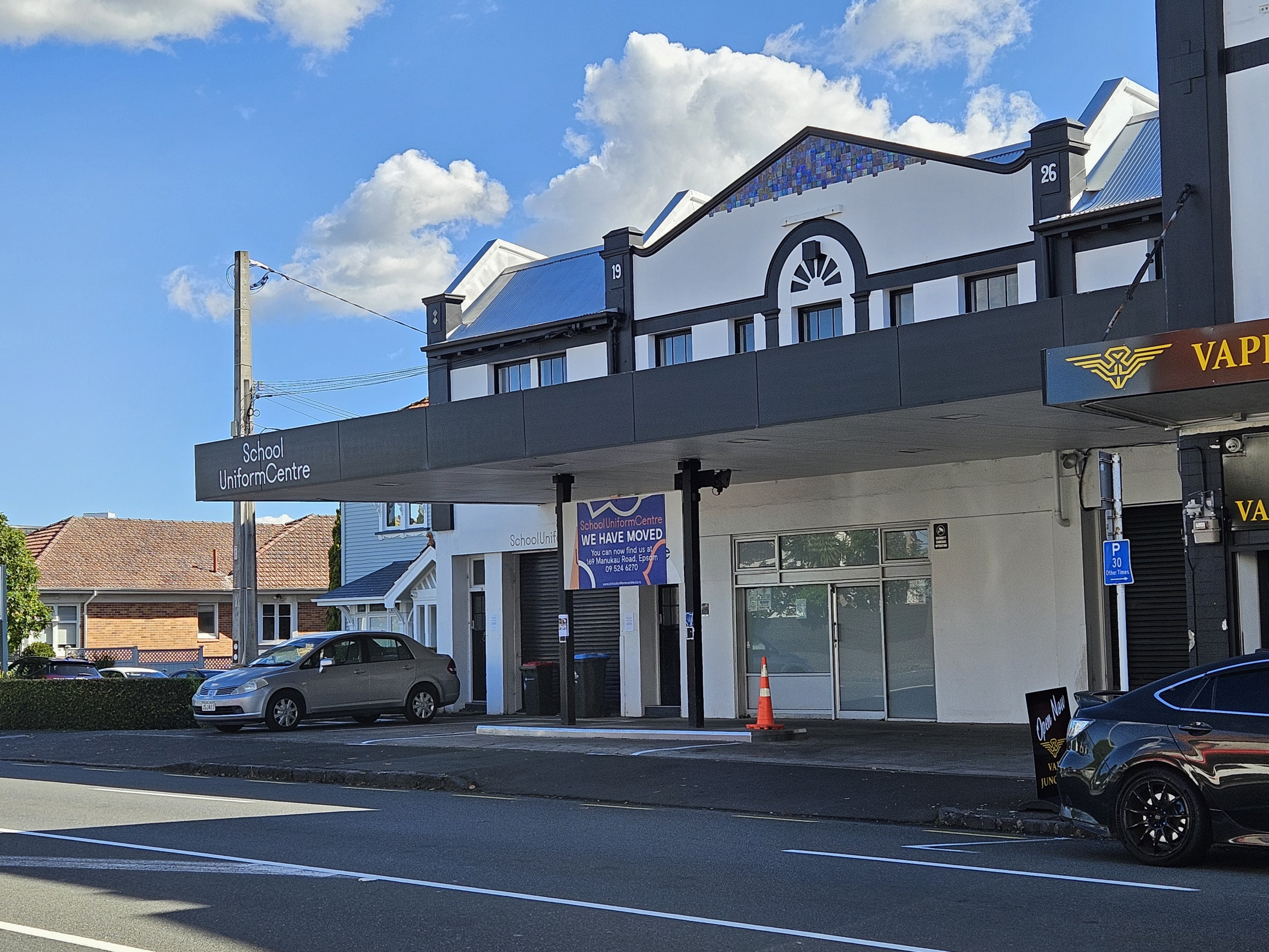
The former McLaren Garage in Remuera, Auckland

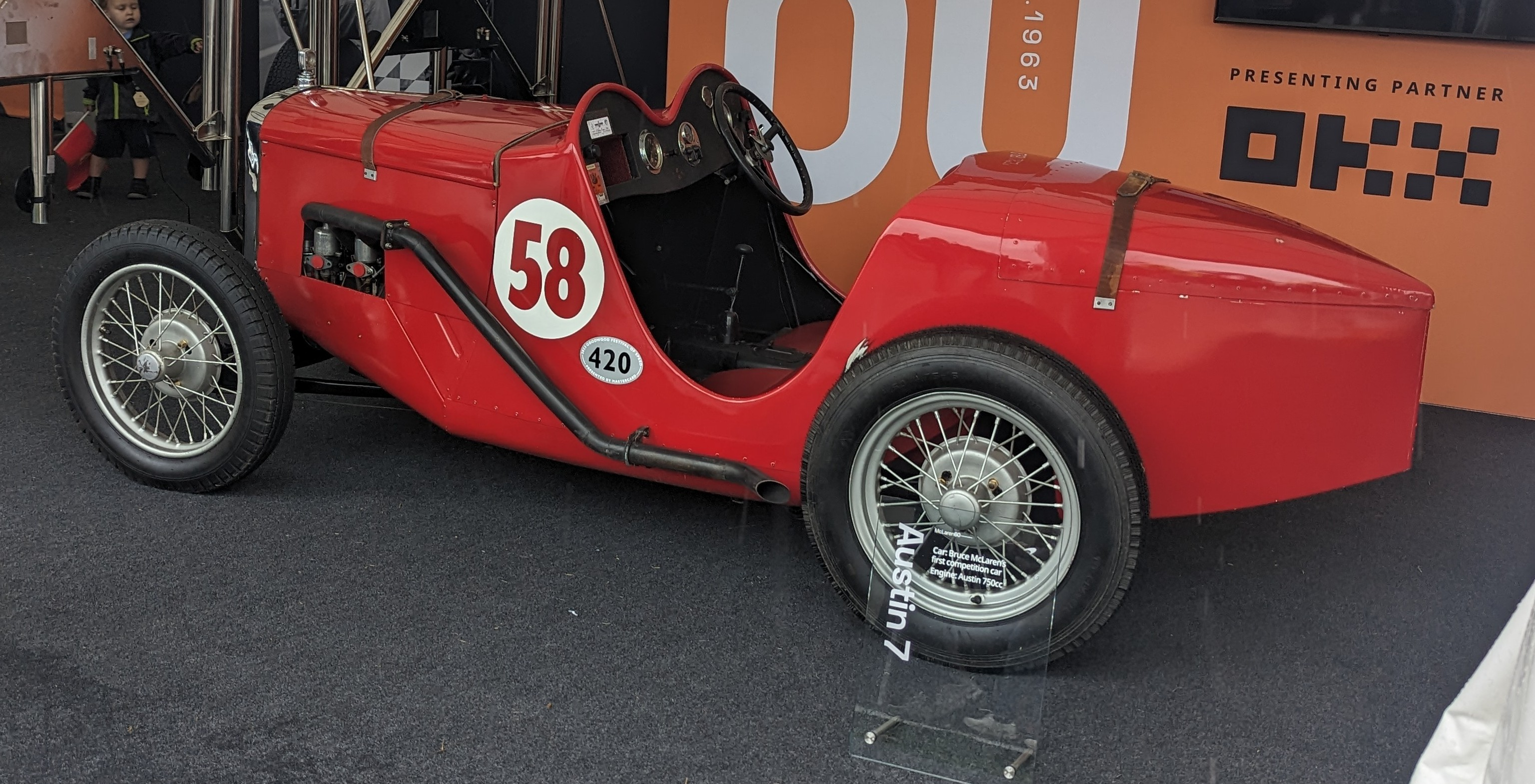
The 1929 Austin 7 Ulster that McLaren restored with his father

Bruce Leslie McLaren was born on 30 August 1937 in Auckland, New Zealand, to Les and Ruth McLaren. He attended Meadowbank Primary School before being diagnosed with Legg–Calvé–Perthes disease in his hip as a nine-year-old. The condition required extended periods of treatment, including nearly three years in hospital, and left him with a permanent limp and his left leg shorter than the right.

McLaren's parents owned a service station and workshop in Remuera Road, Remuera, Auckland, which was first listed as a Category 1 historic place by Heritage New Zealand in 2006. Les McLaren had been a motorcycle racing enthusiast before Bruce's birth and raced cars at the club level. Bruce spent his free time in the workshop, developing his interest in engineering and motor vehicles.

After finishing high school at Seddon Memorial Technical College, McLaren enrolled in the School of Engineering at the University of Auckland, but dropped out to focus on racing; his student record card reportedly ended with the words "went motor racing".

McLaren's early exposure to mechanical work shaped his understanding of vehicle dynamics. At the age of 14, he persuaded his father to purchase a dismantled 1929 Austin 7 Ulster, which they restored together. He began competitive driving in this car at local hillclimbs and club events in New Zealand, showing technical aptitude and racing ability from an early age.

=== Etymology of McLaren surname ===
In 1972, two years after Bruce's death, his great-grandfather celebrated his 100th birthday, it was then after retrieving his birth certificate that their family found that his original surname was 'Howie' rather than 'McLaren', which was thought to have been his original family name, which began with Ben Howie, later McLaren.

Howie, born in the Australian state of South Australia had then relocated to New Zealand and married a publican’s daughter while residing there. After returning to South Australia, he fell in love with, and subsequently began a relationship with Frances Moyle, a married woman with three children. Howie then again relocated to New Zealand with his new wife Frances, adopting the surname 'McLaren', a reference to the famous McLaren Vale wine region in South Australia (located 40 km (24 mi) south of Adelaide, the state's capital city), to conceal his old life.

== Early racing career ==
After progressing from the Austin 7 to a Ford 10 special and an Austin-Healey, McLaren acquired a Cooper–Climax Formula Two car. His domestic performances in this vehicle led to his selection for New Zealand's "Driver to Europe" programme, administered by the New Zealand International Grand Prix organisation. The scholarship enabled him to move to Europe in 1958 to compete internationally.

McLaren's performances in Formula Two attracted the attention of Australian driver Jack Brabham, who recommended him to Cooper Cars founder Charles Cooper and his son John Cooper. By the end of the decade, McLaren had secured a permanent place in the Cooper works team and won his first World Championship Grand Prix.

== Formula One career ==
=== Cooper (1958–1965) ===
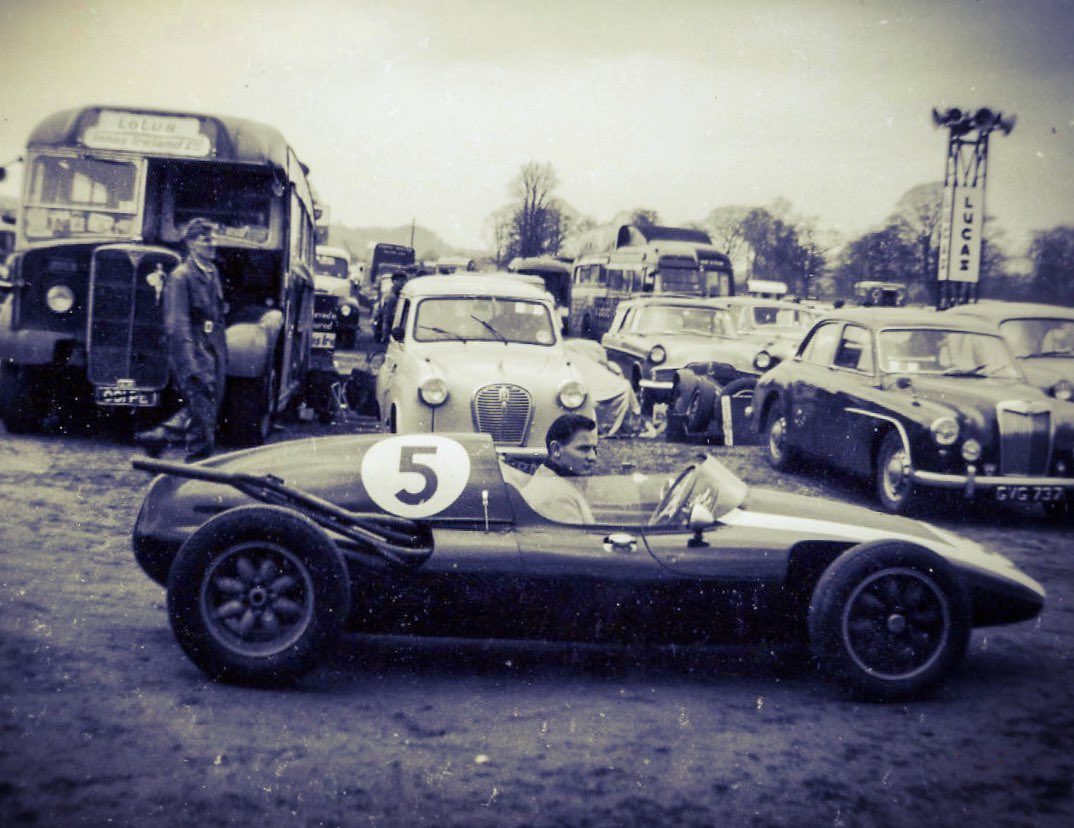
McLaren at Oulton Park in 1959

McLaren made his Formula One debut at the 1958 German Grand Prix at the Nürburgring. He formally joined the Cooper works team for the 1959 season, partnering Jack Brabham. Cooper was at the forefront of the shift to rear-engined cars, a change that redefined Formula One chassis design.

At the 1959 United States Grand Prix at Sebring, McLaren won his first World Championship Grand Prix at the age of 22 years and 104 days. He held the record as the youngest winner in Formula One history for over four decades. He opened the 1960 season with victory at the Argentine Grand Prix and remained a consistent front-runner, finishing second in the 1960 World Drivers' Championship behind Brabham.

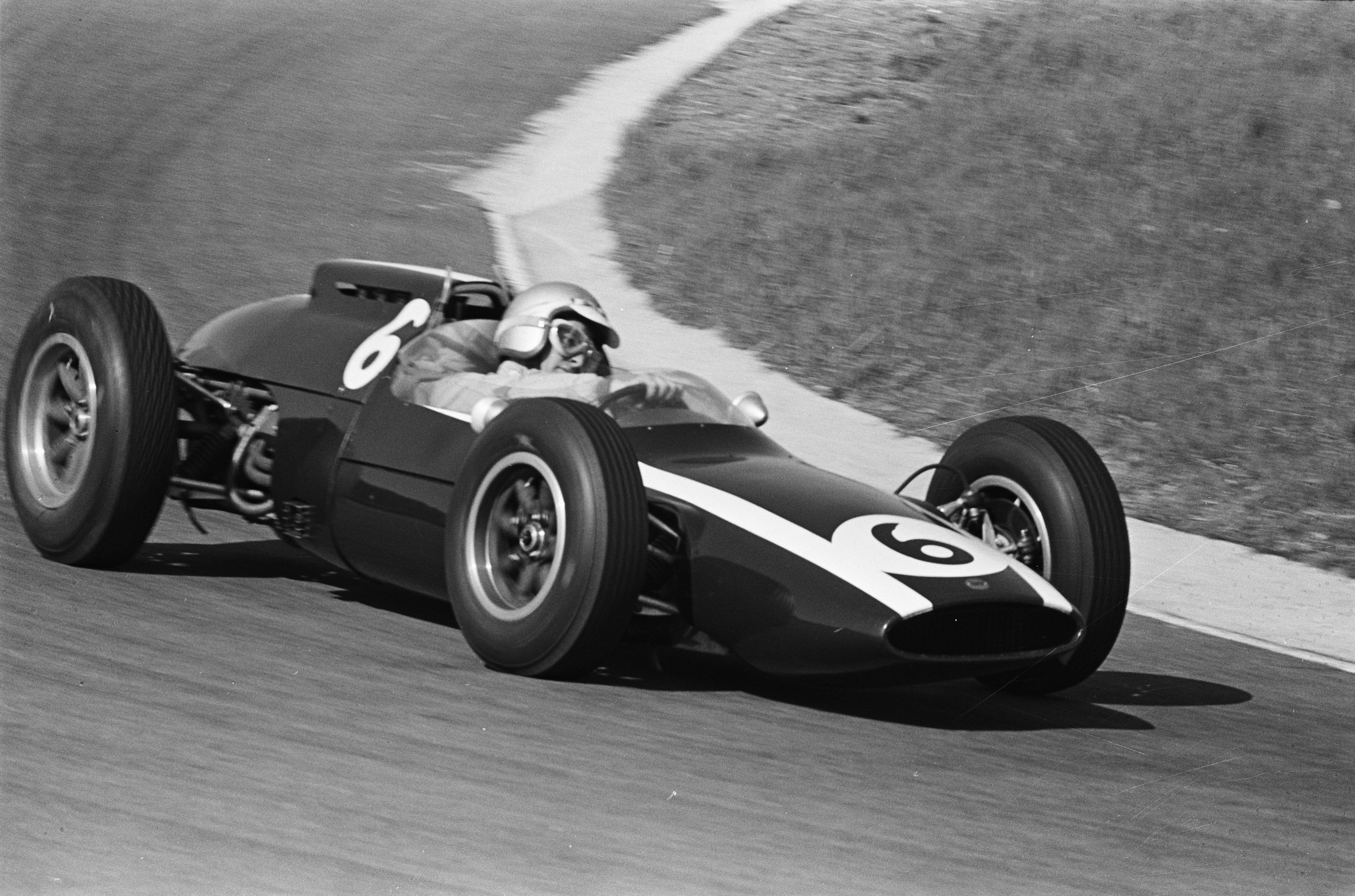
McLaren at the 1962 Dutch Grand Prix

When Brabham left Cooper at the end of 1961 to form his own team, McLaren assumed the role of lead driver. McLaren won the 1962 Monaco Grand Prix, finishing third in the 1962 championship behind Graham Hill and Jim Clark. Across his Formula One career he took four victories, 27 podium finishes, and three fastest laps in 100 starts. He also contributed to the development of Cooper's cars, providing technical feedback that sustained the team's competitiveness during this period.

=== McLaren as constructor-driver (1966–1970) ===
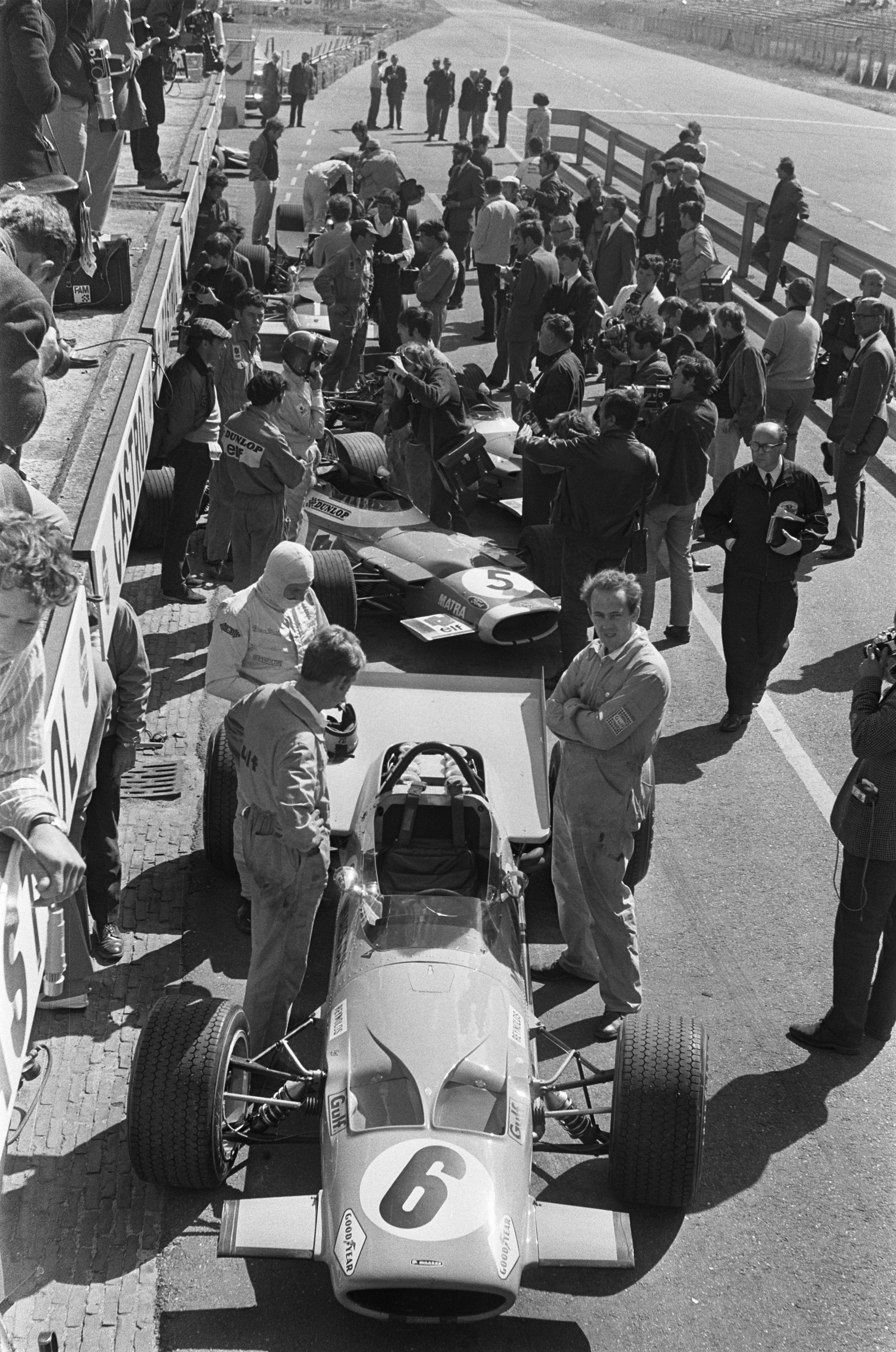
McLaren at the 1969 Dutch Grand Prix

In 1963, McLaren founded Bruce McLaren Motor Racing Ltd., initially fielding modified Coopers in the Tasman Series and developing sports cars. The team entered Formula One as a constructor in 1966. Early chassis, including the McLaren M2B, struggled with heavy, underpowered engines (initially modified Ford Indianapolis V8s and Serenissima units) and limited financial resources.

The team's fortunes improved with the adoption of the Cosworth DFV engine. McLaren took the team's first Formula One victory at the 1968 Belgian Grand Prix at Spa-Francorchamps, driving the McLaren M7A. This made him one of only three drivers, alongside Jack Brabham and Dan Gurney, to win a World Championship race in a car of their own construction.

The 1969 championship was a strong year for the team, with McLaren finishing third in the standings. By the late 1960s, he increasingly delegated driving duties to concentrate on team management and engineering development.

== Sports car racing ==
McLaren competed extensively in endurance racing alongside his Formula One commitments. His most notable sports car result came at the 1966 24 Hours of Le Mans, which he won with Chris Amon in a 7.0-litre Ford GT40 Mk II. Ford management had instructed the leading cars to stage a dead-heat finish; race officials ultimately awarded victory to McLaren and Amon because, having started further back on the grid, they had covered a marginally greater distance over 24 hours than the sister car of Ken Miles and Denny Hulme.

== Can-Am series ==
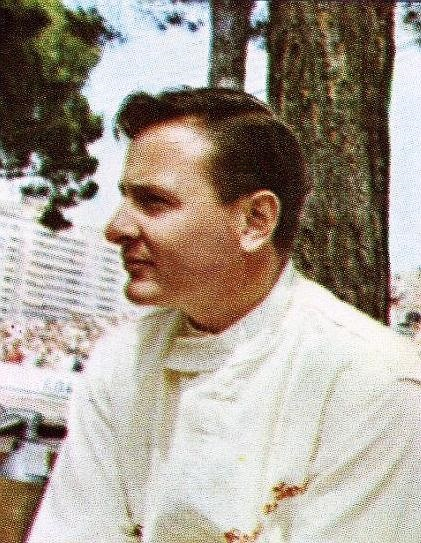
McLaren in 1966

McLaren achieved his greatest competitive success in the Canadian-American Challenge Cup (Can-Am), a Group 7 sports car series with minimal restrictions on aerodynamics and engine displacement.

In 1967, the team introduced the McLaren M6A, their first purpose-built monocoque chassis, finished in what became the team's signature Papaya Orange livery. Powered by large-displacement Chevrolet V8 engines, the car won five of the six races that season, with McLaren taking the drivers' championship.

The dominance continued in subsequent years, earning the series the nickname the "Bruce and Denny Show" after McLaren and teammate Denny Hulme. In 1969, driving the McLaren M8B, the team won all 11 races on the calendar. McLaren secured his second Can-Am title that year with six victories to Hulme's five.

== Driving style and engineering approach ==
McLaren was known for strong mechanical sympathy and an instinctive grasp of chassis behaviour. His driving style emphasised consistency and mechanical preservation over outright pace. He played a hands-on role in the testing and development of his cars, translating what he felt behind the wheel into precise feedback for his engineers.

== Death ==
McLaren was killed on 2 June 1970 while testing a McLaren M8D Can-Am car at Goodwood Circuit in West Sussex, England. Travelling at an estimated 170 miles per hour (270 km/h) on the Lavant Straight, the rear bodywork separated from the chassis. The sudden loss of downforce destabilised the car, which spun off the track and struck a concrete bunker used as a flag station. McLaren died instantly upon impact.

He was 32 years old. McLaren was buried at Waikumete Cemetery in Glen Eden.

Motorsport author Eoin Young wrote that McLaren had "virtually penned his own epitaph" in his 1964 book From the Cockpit, in which McLaren had written in light of teammate Timmy Mayer's death: "To do something well is so worthwhile that to die trying to do it better cannot be foolhardy. It would be a waste of life to do nothing with one's ability, for I feel that life is measured in achievement, not in years alone."

== Legacy ==
The Formula One team Bruce McLaren founded in 1963 continued on after his death. As of 2025, the team has won 10 Constructors' Championships and 13 Drivers' Championships and are the second oldest continuously running team in Formula One behind only Ferrari.

Several tributes were made to McLaren after his death. The Bruce McLaren Intermediate School in West Auckland was named after him. It was originally going to be called Henderson South Intermediate. The school is on Bruce McLaren Road, in the suburb of McLaren Park. In 2015, the Taupō Motorsport Park in New Zealand was renamed Bruce McLaren Motorsport Park. In 2000, Motorsport NZ and the Prodrive Trust created the Bruce McLaren Scholarship to help up-and-coming New Zealand racing drivers. A Ryman Healthcare village in Howick, Auckland is named as Bruce McLaren Retirement Village. The University of Auckland Formula SAE team use Bruce's racing number 47 as their car number in memory of Bruce.

McLaren was inducted into the New Zealand Sports Hall of Fame in 1990, the International Motorsports Hall of Fame in 1991, the Indianapolis Motor Speedway Hall of Fame in 1991, the New Zealand Motorsports Wall of Fame in 1994, and the Motorsports Hall of Fame of America in 1995. He was also inducted into the New Zealand Business Hall of Fame in 2022.

The Bruce McLaren Trust, based in Auckland, New Zealand, perpetuates his memory and runs a small museum, formerly located in the flat where Bruce grew up (above a petrol station in Remuera), now located at Hampton Downs Motorsport Park.

== In popular culture ==
In January 2007, it was announced that a movie was to be made about Bruce McLaren by Barrie Osborne. It was ultimately never made. The story of Bruce McLaren was told in the 2017 documentary film McLaren by Roger Donaldson. McLaren was portrayed by Benjamin Rigby in the 2019 drama film Ford v Ferrari.

New Zealand alternative rock group NRA (Not Really Anything) released a single "Bruce McLaren" in 1991.

== Racing record ==
=== Complete Formula One World Championship results ===
(key) (Races in italics indicate fastest lap)

Year	Entrant	Chassis	Engine	1	2	3	4	5	6	7	8	9	10	11	12	13	WDC	Pts.
1958	Cooper Car Company	Cooper T45 F2	Climax Straight-4	ARG	MON	NED	500	BEL	FRA	GBR	GER; 5*	POR	ITA	MOR; 13			NC	0*
1959	Cooper Car Company	Cooper T45	Climax Straight-4	MON; 5	500	NED											6th	16.5
1959	Cooper Car Company	Cooper T51	Climax Straight-4				FRA; 5	GBR; 3	GER; Ret	POR; Ret	ITA; Ret	USA; 1					6th	16.5
1960	Cooper Car Company	Cooper T51	Climax Straight-4	ARG; 1													**2nd**	**34 (37)**
1960	Cooper Car Company	Cooper T53	Climax Straight-4		MON; 2	500	NED; Ret	BEL; 2	FRA; 3	GBR; 4	POR; 2	ITA	USA; 3				**2nd**	**34 (37)**
1961	Cooper Car Company	Cooper T55	Climax Straight-4	MON; 6	NED; 12	BEL; Ret	FRA; 5	GBR; 8	GER; 6	ITA; 3	USA; 4						8th	11
1962	Cooper Car Company	Cooper T60	Climax V8	NED; Ret	MON; 1	BEL; Ret	FRA; 4	GBR; 3	GER; 5	ITA; 3	USA; 3	RSA; 2					**3rd**	**27 (32)**
1963	Cooper Car Company	Cooper T66	Climax V8	MON; 3	BEL; 2	NED; Ret	FRA; 12	GBR; Ret	GER; Ret	ITA; 3	USA; 11	MEX; Ret	RSA; 4				6th	17
1964	Cooper Car Company	Cooper T66	Climax V8	MON; Ret													7th	13
1964	Cooper Car Company	Cooper T73	Climax V8		NED; 7	BEL; 2	FRA; 6	GBR; Ret	GER; Ret	AUT; Ret	ITA; 2	USA; Ret	MEX; 7				7th	13
1965	Cooper Car Company	Cooper T73	Climax V8	RSA; 5													9th	10
1965	Cooper Car Company	Cooper T77	Climax V8		MON; 5	BEL; 3	FRA; Ret	GBR; 10	NED; Ret	GER; Ret	ITA; 5	USA; Ret	MEX; Ret				9th	10
1966	Bruce McLaren Motor Racing	McLaren M2B	Ford V8	MON; Ret							USA; 5	MEX; Ret					16th	3
1966	Bruce McLaren Motor Racing	McLaren M2B	Serenissima V8		BEL; DNS	FRA	GBR; 6	NED; DNS	GER	ITA							16th	3
1967	Bruce McLaren Motor Racing	McLaren M4B	BRM V8	RSA	MON; 4	NED; Ret	BEL										14th	3
1967	Anglo American Racers	Eagle T1G	Weslake V12					FRA; Ret	GBR; Ret	GER; Ret							14th	3
1967	Bruce McLaren Motor Racing	McLaren M5A	BRM V12								CAN; 7	ITA; Ret	USA; Ret	MEX; Ret			14th	3
1968	Bruce McLaren Motor Racing	McLaren M7A	Cosworth V8	RSA	ESP; Ret	MON; Ret	BEL; 1	NED; Ret	FRA; 8	GBR; 7	GER; 13	ITA; Ret	CAN; 2	USA; 6	MEX; 2		5th	22
1969	Bruce McLaren Motor Racing	McLaren M7B	Cosworth V8	RSA; 5													**3rd**	**26**
1969	Bruce McLaren Motor Racing	McLaren M7C	Cosworth V8		ESP; 2	MON; 5	NED; Ret	FRA; 4	GBR; 3	GER; 3	ITA; 4	CAN; 5	USA; DNS	MEX; DNS			**3rd**	**26**
1970	Bruce McLaren Motor Racing	McLaren M14A	Cosworth V8	RSA; Ret	ESP; 2	MON; Ret	BEL	NED	FRA	GBR	GER	AUT	ITA	CAN	USA	MEX	14th	6

* McLaren was ineligible to score points in the 1958 German Grand Prix because he was driving a Formula Two car.

=== Non-championship results ===
(key) (Races in bold indicate pole position) (Races in italics indicate fastest lap)

Year	Entrant	Chassis	Engine	1	2	3	4	5	6	7	8	9	10	11	12	13	14	15	16	17	18	19	20	21
1958	Cooper Car Company	Cooper T45	Climax Straight-4	BUE	GLV	SYR	AIN; 13	INT; 9	CAE															
1959	Cooper Car Company	Cooper T45	Climax Straight-4	GLV; 6	AIN; 3	INT; Ret																		
1959	Cooper Car Company	Cooper T51	Climax Straight-4				OUL; Ret	SIL																
1960	Cooper Car Company	Cooper T51	Climax Straight-4	BUE; Ret	GLV; 4																			
1960	Cooper Car Company	Cooper T53	Climax Straight-4			INT; 14	SIL; 3	LOM	OUL; 4															
1961	Cooper Car Company	Cooper T53	Climax V8	LOM	GLV	PAU	BRX; 2	VIE						SOL; 4	KAN	DAN	MOD	FLG	**OUL**; 3	LEW	VAL	RAN	NAT	RSA
1961	Cooper Car Company	Cooper T55	Climax V8						AIN; 2	SYR; WD	NAP	LON	SIL; Ret											
1962	Cooper Car Company	Cooper T55	Climax V8	CAP	BRX	LOM	**LAV**; 1	GLV; 2	PAU	AIN; 2	INT; 5	NAP	MAL	CLP; 3										
1962	Cooper Car Company	Cooper T60	Climax V8												RMS; 1	SOL	KAN	MED	DAN	OUL; Ret	MEX; Ret	RAN	NAT	
1963	Cooper Car Company	Cooper T66	Climax V8	LOM; 4	GLV; 2	PAU	IMO	SYR	AIN; 5	INT; 2	ROM	SOL	KAN	MED	AUT	OUL; 6	RAN							
1964	Cooper Car Company	Cooper T66	Climax V8	DMT; 3	NWT; Ret	SYR																		
1964	Cooper Car Company	Cooper T73	Climax V8				AIN; Ret	INT; 15	SOL	MED	RAN													
1965	Cooper Car Company	Cooper T77	Climax V8	ROC; 5	SYR	SMT; 4	INT; 6	MED	RAN															
1967	Bruce McLaren Motor Racing	McLaren M4B	BRM V8	ROC; Ret	SPR; 5	INT; 5	SYR	OUL	ESP															
1968	Bruce McLaren Motor Racing	McLaren M7A	Ford-Cosworth V8	**ROC**; 1	INT; 2	OUL																		
1969	Bruce McLaren Motor Racing	McLaren M7B	Ford-Cosworth V8	ROC; Ret																				
1969	Bruce McLaren Motor Racing	McLaren M7C	Ford-Cosworth V8		INT; 6	MAD	OUL																	
1970	Bruce McLaren Motor Racing	McLaren M14A	Ford-Cosworth V8	ROC; Ret	INT; 4	OUL																		

=== Complete 24 Hours of Le Mans results ===
Year	Team	Co-drivers	Car	Class	Laps	Pos.	Class pos.
1959	(United Kingdom) Cooper Car Company	(United Kingdom) Jim Russell	Cooper Monaco	S 2.0	79	DNF	DNF
1961	(United States) Briggs Cunningham	(United States) Walt Hansgen	Maserati Tipo 63	S 3.0	31	DNF	DNF
1962	(United States) Briggs Cunningham	(United States) Walt Hansgen	Maserati Tipo 151	E +3.0	177	DNF	DNF
1963	(United Kingdom) David Brown Racing Dept.	(United Kingdom) Innes Ireland	Aston Martin DP214	GT +3.0	59	DNF	DNF
1964	(United States) Ford Motor Company	(United States) Phil Hill	Ford GT40	P 5.0	192	DNF	DNF
1965	(United States) Shelby American Inc.	(United Kingdom) Ken Miles	Ford GT40X	P +5.0	89	DNF	DNF
1966	(United States) Shelby American Inc.	(New Zealand) Chris Amon	Ford Mk.II	P +5.0	360	**1st**	**1st**
1967	(United States) Shelby American Inc.	(United States) Mark Donohue	Ford Mk.IV	P +5.0	359	4th	4th
1969	(United Kingdom) John Woolfe Racing	(United Kingdom) John Woolfe	McLaren M6B	S 5.0	-	DNA	DNA

=== Complete British Saloon Car Championship results ===
(key) (Races in bold indicate pole position; races in italics indicate fastest lap.)

Year	Team	Car	Class	1	2	3	4	5	6	7	8	9	Pos.	Pts	Class
1961	Peter Berry Racing Ltd	Jaguar Mk II 3.8	D	SNE	GOO ovr:5 cls:5	AIN ovr:3 cls:3	SIL ovr:3 cls:3	CRY	SIL; Ret	BRH ovr:4 cls:4	OUL ovr:3 cls:3	SNE ovr:3 cls:3	13th	16	4th
1965	Nippon Racing	Isuzu Bellett	C	BRH	OUL	SNE	GOO; DNS	SIL	CRY	BRH	OUL		NC	0	NC

=== Complete Tasman Series results ===
Year	Chassis	1	2	3	4	5	6	7	8	Rank	Points
1964	Cooper T70	LEV (3)	PUK; 1	WIG; 1	TER; 1	SAN; Ret	WAR; 2	LAK (3)	LON; 2	**1st**	**39 (47)**
1965	Cooper T79	PUK; Ret	LEV (5)	WIG; 2	TER; 2	WAR; Ret	SAN; 4	LON; 1		**2nd**	**24 (26)**
1968	BRM P126	PUK; Ret	LEV; Ret	WIG; 5	TER; 1	SUR	WAR	SAN	LON	6th	11

=== Complete Canadian-American Challenge Cup results ===
(key) (Races in bold indicate pole position) (Races in italics indicate fastest lap)

Year	Team	Car	Engine	1	2	3	4	5	6	7	8	9	10	11	Pos	Points
1966	Bruce McLaren Motor Racing	McLaren M1B	Chevrolet V8	MTR; 2	BRI; 3	MOS; Ret	LAG; 3	**RIV**; Ret	LVG; 3						3rd	20
1967	Bruce Mclaren Motor Racing	McLaren M6A	Chevrolet V8	**ROA**; Ret	BRI; 2	MOS; 2	**LAG**; 1	RIV; 1	**LVG**; Ret						1st	30
1968	Bruce McLaren Motor Racing	McLaren M8A	Chevrolet V8	**ROA**; 2	BRI; Ret	EDM; 2*	**LAG**; 5	**RIV**; 1	LVG; 6						2nd	24
1969	Bruce McLaren Motor Racing	McLaren M8B	Chevrolet V8	**MOS**; 1	**MTR**; 2*	**WGL**; 1	EDM; Ret	MOH; 2	ROA; 1	**BRI**; 2	MCH; 1	**LAG**; 1	RIV; Ret	TWS; 1	1st	165

* Joint fastest lap.

== See also ==
- Formula One drivers from New Zealand

== Bibliography ==
- Baime, A.J. (2009). Go Like Hell: Ford, Ferrari, and Their Battle for Speed and Glory at Le Mans. Bantam Press. ISBN 978-0593057957.
- Lyons, Pete (1995). Can-Am. Motorbooks. ISBN 978-0760300176.
- Taylor, William (2009). McLaren: The Cars 1964–2008. Coterie Press. ISBN 978-1902351322.
- Young, Eoin (1971). McLaren! The Man, the Cars and the Team. Bond Parkhurst. ISBN 978-0878800070.
- Young, Eoin (2005). McLaren Memories: A Biography of Bruce McLaren. HarperCollins. ISBN 978-1869505387.

Sporting positions
Preceded by Inaugural	Tasman Series; Champion; 1964	Succeeded by Jim Clark
Preceded by Jochen Rindt; Masten Gregory	Winner of the 24 Hours of Le Mans; 1966; With: Chris Amon	Succeeded by Dan Gurney; A. J. Foyt
Preceded by John Surtees	Can-Am; Champion; 1967	Succeeded by Denny Hulme
Preceded by Dan Gurney	Brands Hatch Race of Champions; Winner; 1968	Succeeded by Jackie Stewart
Preceded by Denny Hulme	Can-Am; Champion; 1969	Succeeded by Denny Hulme
Records
Preceded by Troy Ruttman; 22 years, 80 days (1952 Indianapolis 500)	Youngest driver to score points in Formula One; 21 years, 253 days (1959 Monaco Grand Prix)	Succeeded by Ricardo Rodríguez; 20 years, 123 days (1962 Belgian GP)
Preceded by Stirling Moss; 24 years, 303 days (1954 British GP)	Youngest driver to set fastest lap in Formula One; 21 years, 322 days (1959 British Grand Prix)	Succeeded by Fernando Alonso; 21 years, 321 days (2003 Canadian GP)
Preceded by Troy Ruttman; 22 years, 80 days (1952 Indianapolis 500)	Youngest driver to score a podium position in Formula One; 21 years, 322 days (1959 British Grand Prix)	Succeeded by Elio de Angelis; 21 years, 307 days (1980 Brazilian GP)
Preceded by Stirling Moss; 25 years, 302 days (1955 season)	Youngest Formula One; World Drivers' Championship runner-up 23 years, 5 days (1960 season)	Succeeded by Lewis Hamilton; 22 years, 287 days (2007 season)
