= Cooper T80 =

Formula One racing car

The Cooper T80 was a Formula One racing car designed for the stillborn Climax FWMW 1.5 litre flat-16 engine. It was later converted to take a Maserati V12 as a test mule pending the arrival of the Cooper T81 chassis.

== Development history ==
Cooper had prepared a chassis, designated T80, to take the Climax FWMW flat-16 1.5 litre engine for 1965 but the engine had suffered development problems and more importantly was no more powerful than the existing FWMV V8. Cooper then repurposed the chassis as a development mule for the Maserati Tipo 9 2.5-litre V12, enlarged to 3 litres. The Maserati engine would be used in Cooper's first purpose-built 3 litre Formula One car, the T81.

== Race history ==
The T80 contested only a single race, the non-championship 1966 BRDC International Trophy. Jo Siffert's T81 suffered engine failure during practice and he drove the T80 in the race, retiring after 12 laps with clutch trouble.
