= 1965 Sunday Mirror Trophy =

- Non-championship race in the 1965 Formula One season

Race details
- Date: 19 April 1965
- Official name: I Sunday Mirror Trophy
- Location: Goodwood Circuit, West Sussex
- Course: Permanent racing facility
- Course length: 3.862 km (2.4 miles)
- Distance: 42 laps, 162.2 km (100.8 miles)

Pole position
Driver	(United Kingdom) Jackie Stewart	BRM
- Time: 1:19.8

Fastest lap
Drivers	(United Kingdom) Jackie Stewart	BRM
	(United Kingdom) Jim Clark	Lotus-Climax
- Time: 1:20.4

Podium
First	(United Kingdom) Jim Clark	Lotus-Climax
Second	(United Kingdom) Graham Hill	BRM
Third	(Australia) Jack Brabham	Brabham-Climax

The 1st Sunday Mirror Trophy was a motor race, run to Formula One rules, held on 19 April 1965 at Goodwood Circuit, England. The race was run over 42 laps of the circuit, and was won by British driver Jim Clark in a Lotus 25.

== Results ==
Pos	Driver	Entrant	Constructor	Time/Retired	Grid
1	(United Kingdom) Jim Clark	Team Lotus	Lotus-Climax	57:33.8	3
2	(United Kingdom) Graham Hill	Owen Racing Organisation	BRM	+ 24.2 s	2
3	(Australia) Jack Brabham	Brabham Racing Organisation	Brabham-Climax	+ 50.8 s	6
4	(New Zealand) Bruce McLaren	Cooper Car Company	Cooper-Climax	41 laps	7
5	(Sweden) Jo Bonnier	Rob Walker Racing Team	Brabham-Climax	41 laps	10
6	(United Kingdom) Richard Attwood	Reg Parnell (Racing)	Lotus-BRM	41 laps	12
7	(United Kingdom) John Taylor	Gerard Racing	Cooper-Climax	40 laps	14
8	(United Kingdom) John Rhodes	Gerard Racing	Cooper-Ford	39 laps	17
9	(United States) Dan Gurney	Brabham Racing Organisation	Brabham-Climax	Oil pressure	8
10	(United Kingdom) Jackie Stewart	Owen Racing Organisation	BRM	Camshaft	1
11	(United Kingdom) John Cardwell	Robert Ashcroft Racing	Brabham-Ford	Out of fuel	16
12	(United Kingdom) Rodney Bloor	Sports Motors (Manchester)	Brabham-Ford	37 laps	15
DSQ	(Austria) Jochen Rindt	Cooper Car Company	Cooper-Climax	Missed chicane	13
Ret	(Switzerland) Jo Siffert	Rob Walker Racing Team	Brabham-BRM	Accident	11
DSQ	(United Kingdom) Bob Anderson	DW Racing Enterprises	Brabham-Climax	Missed chicane	5
Ret	(Australia) Paul Hawkins	DW Racing Enterprises	Lotus-Climax	Scavenge pump	18
DNS	(United Kingdom) Mike Spence	Team Lotus	Lotus-Climax	Fuel injection on grid	(4)
DNS	(Australia) Frank Gardner	John Willment Automobiles	Brabham-BRM	Engine	(9)
WD	(United Kingdom) Mike Hailwood	Reg Parnell (Racing)	Lotus-BRM	Car damaged	-

Previous race: 1965 Syracuse Grand Prix	Formula One non-championship races 1965 season	Next race: 1965 BRDC International Trophy
Previous race: —	Sunday Mirror Trophy	Next race: —
