= 1965 BRDC International Trophy =

- Non-championship race in the 1965 Formula One season
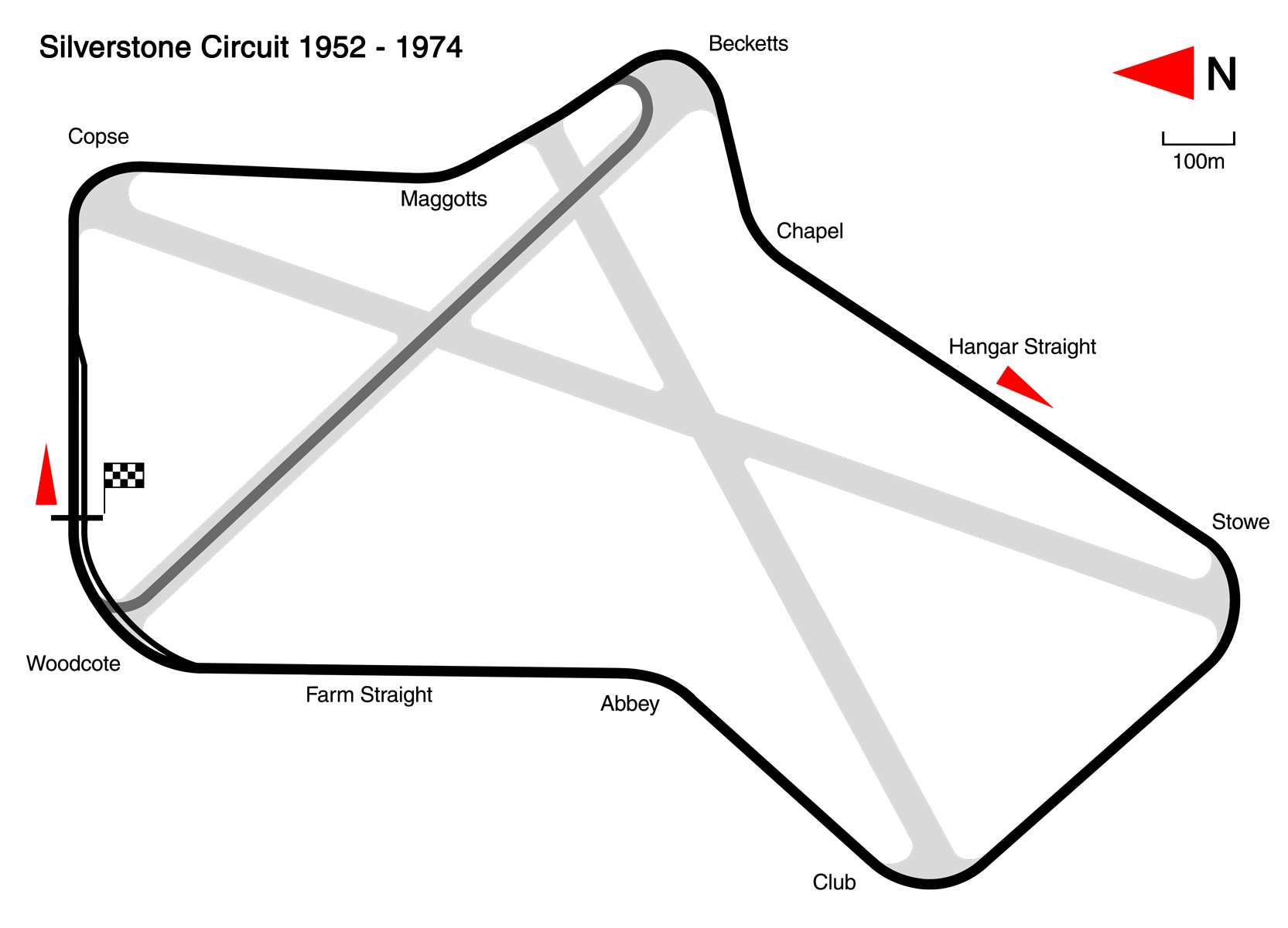

Race details
- Date: 15 May 1965
- Official name: XVII BRDC International Trophy
- Location: Silverstone Circuit, Northamptonshire
- Course: Permanent racing facility
- Course length: 4.711 km (2.927 miles)
- Distance: 52 laps, 244.972 km (152.204 miles)

Pole position
Driver	(United Kingdom) Graham Hill	BRM
- Time: 1:31.4

Fastest lap
Driver	(United Kingdom) John Surtees	Ferrari
- Time: 1:33.0

Podium
First	(United Kingdom) Jackie Stewart	BRM
Second	(United Kingdom) John Surtees	Ferrari
Third	(United Kingdom) Mike Spence	Lotus-Climax

The 17th BRDC International Trophy was a motor race, run to Formula One rules, held on 15 May 1965 at the Silverstone Circuit, England. The race was run over 52 laps of the Silverstone Grand Prix circuit, and was won by British driver Jackie Stewart in a BRM P261.

== Results ==
Pos	Driver	Entrant	Constructor	Time/Retired	Grid
1	(United Kingdom) Jackie Stewart	Owen Racing Organisation	BRM	1.21:47.0	2
2	(United Kingdom) John Surtees	SEFAC Ferrari	Ferrari	+ 3.0 s	3
3	(United Kingdom) Mike Spence	Team Lotus	Lotus-Climax	+ 56.4 s	5
4	(Mexico) Pedro Rodriguez	Team Lotus	Lotus-Climax	+ 1:33.6 s	13
5	(Sweden) Jo Bonnier	Rob Walker Racing Team	Brabham-Climax	51 laps	8
6	(New Zealand) Bruce McLaren	Cooper Car Company	Cooper-Climax	51 laps	9
7	(Italy) Lorenzo Bandini	SEFAC Ferrari	Ferrari	51 laps	4
8	(United Kingdom) Richard Attwood	Reg Parnell (Racing)	Lotus-BRM	51 laps	12
9	(United Kingdom) Mike Hailwood	Reg Parnell (Racing)	Lotus-BRM	51 laps	15
10	(Australia) Paul Hawkins	DW Racing Enterprises	Lotus-Climax	51 laps	16
11	(United Kingdom) John Taylor	Gerard Racing	Cooper-Climax	50 laps	17
12	(United Kingdom) Ian Raby	Ian Raby (Racing)	Brabham-BRM	50 laps	18
13	(Italy) Roberto Bussinello	Scuderia Centro Sud	BRM	49 laps	20
14	(United Kingdom) Bob Anderson	DW Racing Enterprises	Brabham-Climax	44 laps	14
Ret	(Australia) Jack Brabham	Brabham Racing Organisation	Brabham-Climax	Gearbox	6
Ret	(Australia) Frank Gardner	John Willment Automobiles	Brabham-BRM	Clutch	10
Ret	(Austria) Jochen Rindt	Cooper Car Company	Cooper-Climax	Con-rod	11
Ret	(United Kingdom) Graham Hill	Owen Racing Organisation	BRM	Camshaft	1
Ret	(United Kingdom) John Rhodes	Gerard Racing	Cooper-Ford	Battery	21
Ret	(New Zealand) Denny Hulme	Brabham Racing Organisation	Brabham-Climax	Oil leak	7
Ret	(New Zealand) Chris Amon	Scuderia Centro Sud	BRM	Engine	19
WD	(United Kingdom) Rodney Bloor	Sports Motors (Manchester)	Brabham-Ford		-

Previous race: 1965 Sunday Mirror Trophy	Formula One non-championship races 1965 season	Next race: 1965 Mediterranean Grand Prix
Previous race: 1964 BRDC International Trophy	BRDC International Trophy	Next race: 1966 BRDC International Trophy
