= Ford in Formula One =

Formula One activities of Ford

Ford as a Formula One engine manufacturer

Formula One World Championship career
- First entry: 1951 German Grand Prix
- Last entry: 2004 Brazilian Grand Prix
- Races entered: 528 (523 starts)
- Constructors' Championships: 10 (1968, 1969, 1970, 1971, 1972, 1973, 1974, 1978, 1980, 1981)
- Drivers' Championships: 13 (1968, 1969, 1970, 1971, 1972, 1973, 1974, 1976, 1978, 1980, 1981, 1982, 1994)
- Race victories: 176
- Podiums: 533
- Points: 4286.5
- Pole positions: 139
- Fastest laps: 159

Red Bull Ford as a Formula One engine manufacturer
Formula One World Championship career
- First entry: 2026 Australian Grand Prix
- Last entry: 2026 Mexico City Grand Prix
- Races entered: 19 (18 starts)
- Chassis: Red Bull Racing, Racing Bulls
- Race victories: 2
- Podiums: 12
- Points: 457
- Pole positions: 2
- Fastest laps: 2

The Ford Motor Company, an American car manufacturer, has participated in Formula One in various forms since the 1960s. Ford-badged engines have won 176 Grands Prix, 10 Constructors' Championships and 13 Drivers' Championships, ranking third in Formula One history. Throughout its history in the series, Ford's involvement has been through partnerships with specialist manufacturers, with a focus on marketing rather than technical involvement.

Although Ford engines started seven races between 1963 and 1966, it was in 1967 when Ford officially entered Formula One as an engine supplier through its partnership with Cosworth, introducing the Ford-Cosworth DFV engine. The DFV – developed by Cosworth, with Ford providing funding – won on its debut at the 1967 Dutch Grand Prix with Lotus' Jim Clark and claimed its first Drivers' and Constructors' Championships in 1968 with Graham Hill and Lotus-Ford. The DFV was powerful, reliable, light, compact, easy to work with and relatively affordable, becoming the most popular engine of its era with the majority of teams using it from the late 1960s to the early 1980s. Between 1967 and 1983, the DFV won 155 Grands Prix, 12 Drivers' Championships and 10 Constructors' Championships – Lotus, Matra, Tyrrell, McLaren, Williams and Brabham all secured titles with it.

As turbocharged engines became prevalent in the 1980s, Cosworth developed Ford-badged turbo power units such as the GBA, though these achieved limited success. Ford continued supplying naturally aspirated engines after the turbo era ended in the late 1980s, with teams such as Benetton, McLaren, Jordan, and Tyrrell using Ford-Cosworth engines. Ford's sole World Championship success during this period came in 1994, when Michael Schumacher won the Drivers' Championship with Benetton-Ford. Ford subsequently increased its involvement with Cosworth by purchasing the race engine division of the company in 1998.

Between 1997 and 1999, Ford provided works support for the newly formed Stewart Grand Prix team. The team achieved a race victory in 1999 before being acquired by Ford in 2000, when it was rebranded as Jaguar Racing to promote the then Ford-owned Jaguar brand. Across five seasons, Jaguar Racing never won a Grand Prix, scoring two podiums and a best Constructors' Championship finish of seventh, before Ford withdrew from Formula One at the end of the 2004 season, selling both Jaguar and Cosworth. Ford engines took a single win during the 2000s, with Jordan at the 2003 Brazilian Grand Prix.

Ford remained absent from Formula One until announcing its return as a power unit partner for Red Bull Powertrains beginning in the 2026 season, coinciding with new regulations focused on increased electrification and sustainable fuels.

== Sporadic entrances (1963–1966) ==
Erik Lundgren, whose car was powered by an unspecified Ford V8, was listed in the entry list for the 1951 German Grand Prix, but withdrew.

The first appearance of Ford in a Formula One Grand Prix was the appearance of the Stebro team, whose singular Grand Prix entry was driven by co-founder Peter Broeker, who finished in seventh after retiring 88 laps in. The car utilised a Ford 105E engine. The last two entries in 1963 were two privateer entrants: Brausch Niemann, who drove a Lotus 22 outfitted with the same Ford 105E engine to fourteenth at the 1963 South African Grand Prix, and David Prophet, whose Brabham BT6, again equipped with the Ford 105E, retired from the race. Prophet also entered a non-championship Grand Prix, the 1963 Kanonloppet, where he finished in eleventh.

Two Ford entrants appeared in the 1964 season: John Taylor and Frank Gardner, both at the 1964 British Grand Prix. Of these two, Taylor, a privateer who drove the Cooper T71/73 with the 105E engine, finished in fourteenth, and Gardner failed to finish the race. His entry at the non-championship 1964 Mediterranean Grand Prix also came up fruitless. Prophet finished in eighteenth at the non-championship 1964 Rand Grand Prix; that same race, Paul Hawkins found himself in second place in a Brabham car with a Ford Cosworth engine.

== Partnership with Red Bull Powertrains (2026–) ==
In February 2023, Ford announced that it will return to Formula One in 2026 in partnership with Red Bull Powertrains, supplying power units to Red Bull Racing and their second team Racing Bulls.

Ford achieved their first victory as an engine supplier for Red Bull, when Max Verstappen won the 2026 Bahrain Grand Prix in Malaysia. By securing the pole position for this race, Ford also became the first non Mercedes-powered engine to secure pole position for a race in the 2026 Formula One World Championship. The following race, Verstappen won the 2026 Singapore Grand Prix securing Ford's second victory as engine supplier for Red Bull.
