= Formula One drivers from Canada =

List of Formula One drivers who competed as Canadian

- Drivers: 15
- Grands Prix: 478
- Entries: 546
- Starts: 531
- Best season finish: 1st (1997)
- Wins: 17
- Podiums: 39
- Pole positions: 16
- Fastest laps: 17
- Points: 676
- First entry: 1961 United States Grand Prix
- First win: 1978 Canadian Grand Prix
- Latest win: 1997 Luxembourg Grand Prix
- Latest entry: 2026 Las Vegas Grand Prix
- 2026 drivers: Lance Stroll

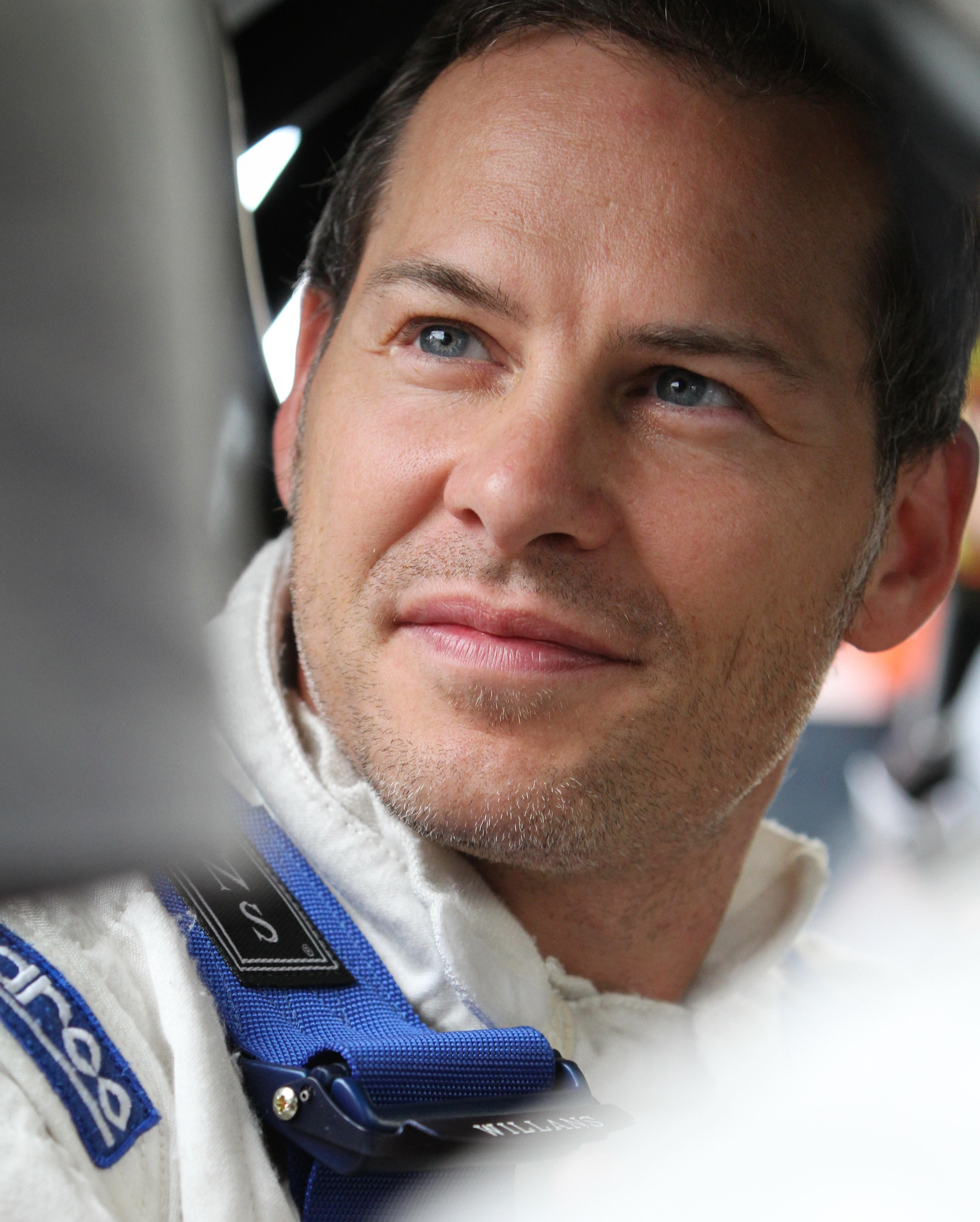
Jacques Villeneuve won the title in 1997

There have been 15 Formula One drivers from Canada, four of whom have scored points. Gilles Villeneuve, six-time Grand Prix winner, died while qualifying for his 68th race. His son, Jacques Villeneuve won the World Drivers' Championship in 1997. Canadian drivers were absent from Formula One from Jacques Villeneuve's departure in 2006 until the arrival of Lance Stroll in 2017.

== Current drivers ==
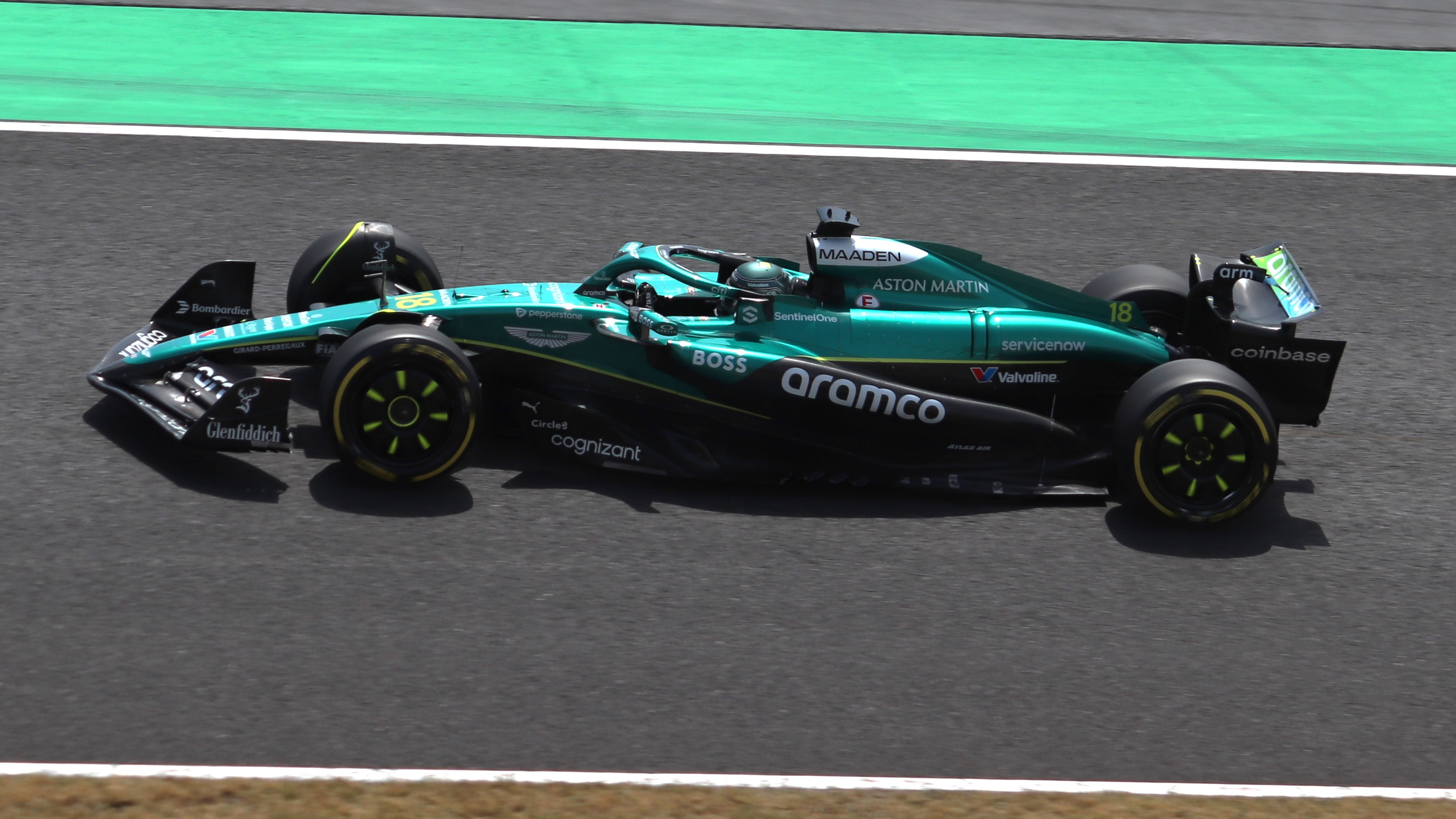
Lance Stroll driving for Aston Martin at the 2025 Japanese Grand Prix

Lance Stroll has competed in Formula One since 2017. He began his Formula One career with Williams and scored a podium at the 2017 Azerbaijan Grand Prix with a third-place finish. Stroll moved to Racing Point for the 2019 season where he was contracted to drive until 2020. He now competes for Aston Martin F1 team, a rebrand of the former Racing Point team.

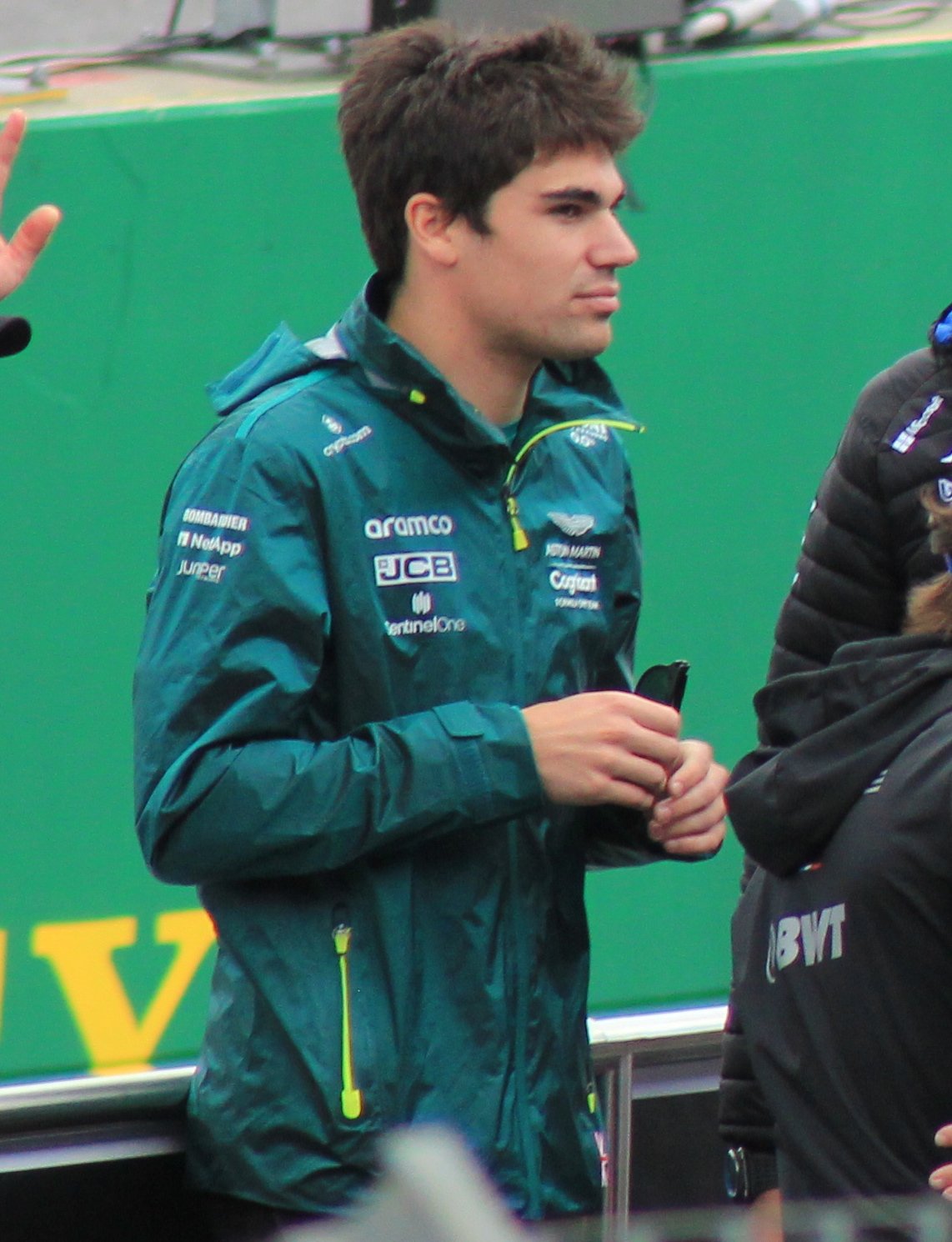
Lance Stroll
2026 season position: 22nd

== Former drivers ==
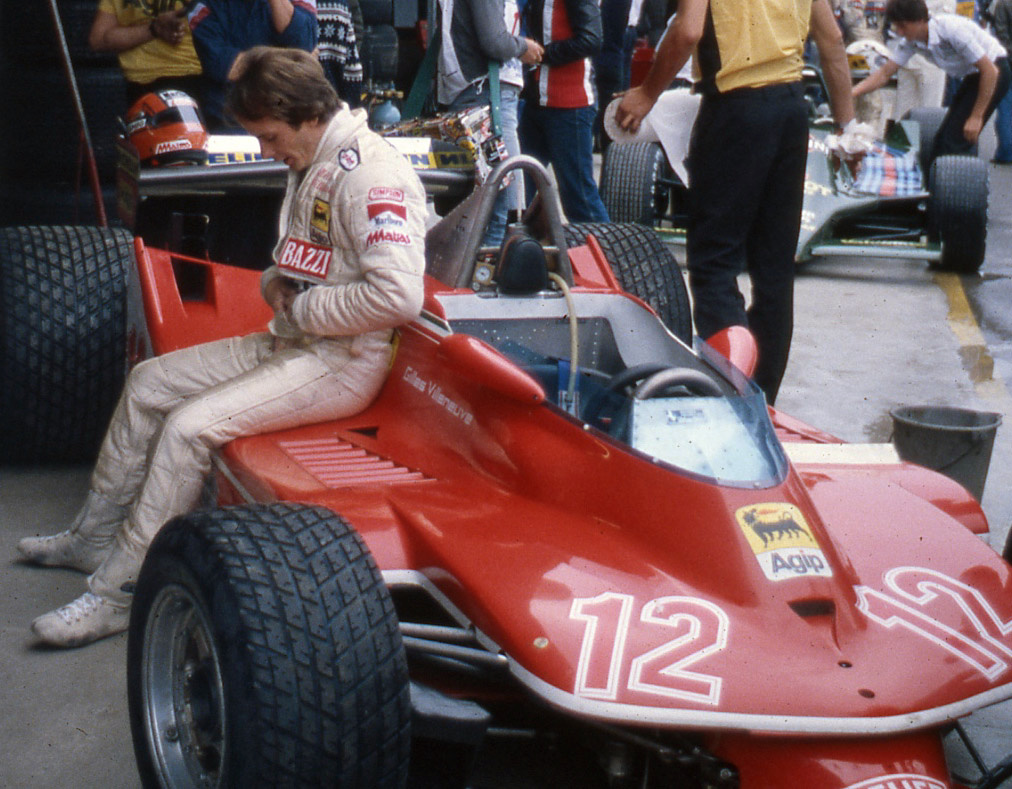
Gilles Villeneuve sitting on his Ferrari at Imola in 1979

Gilles Villeneuve started his Formula One career with a one-off drive for McLaren at the 1977 British Grand Prix. He was quickly signed up by Ferrari to replace the outgoing Niki Lauda and he would remain with the team for all his time in Formula One. Villeneuve's most successful year came in 1979 when he won three races and came second in the drivers' championship. He was killed during qualifying in an accident at the 1982 Belgian Grand Prix – a collision with Jochen Mass pitched his Ferrari into the air and it was destroyed by the impact when it landed. He never won a Formula One drivers' title and only won six races but is held as one of the best racers to ever compete in the sport. In a survey conducted by Autosport asking drivers to vote for their choice of the greatest driver in history Villeneuve was placed tenth. Former teammate Jody Scheckter said of Villeneuve "I will miss Gilles for two reasons. First, he was the fastest driver in the history of motor racing. Second, he was the most genuine man I have ever known."

Jacques Villeneuve, son of Gilles, was eleven at the time of his father's death. He had a successful career in IndyCar, winning the 1995 Indianapolis 500 and the 1995 PPG Indy Car World Series before moving to Formula One with Williams in 1996. He nearly won his first race, but an oil leak forced him to surrender the lead to his teammate and finished second. He went on to win four races that year and clinched second place in the drivers' championship. Seven wins in 1997 saw Villeneuve go one better, achieving the title that had eluded his father. However, he would never win another race in his Formula One career, doing no better than four third-place finishes between 1998 and 2001. He retired from Formula One in 2006.

In 1981 another member of the Villeneuve family had tried his hand at Formula One. Jacques, brother of Gilles, is sometimes now referred to as Jacques Villeneuve Sr. He failed to qualify for either of the two North American races he contested. He tried again at his home Grand Prix in 1983 but was unable to set a time good enough to allow him into the race.

George Eaton competed in 13 Grands Prix with BRM, the majority of which were in 1970. His debut was in the 1969 United States Grand Prix and he entered one other race that year. He attended ten events in 1970, starting eight of them, and left the sport after a single race the following year, the 1971 Canadian Grand Prix. He only finished in four of the eleven races he started with a best finish of tenth.

Allen Berg drove for Osella in 1986, competing in nine races. He saw the chequered flag on three occasions with a highest finish of 12th place.

A number of Canadian drivers have competed solely in races held in their own country. Al Pease drove an Eagle Mk1 in three consecutive Canadian Grands Prix between 1967 and 1969. He was unable to finish any of the races and is remembered as the only driver in F1 history to be disqualified from a race for being too slow. Bill Brack also competed in three home races, starting with Lotus in 1968 then, in 1969 and 1972, driving a BRM. He was unable to finish in any of the events. Eppie Wietzes competed in two home races separated by more than seven years. He drove a Lotus in 1967 and a Brabham in 1974 but was unable to finish either race.

Peter Ryan (1961), John Cordts (1969), and John Cannon (1971) all competed in one Grand Prix each. Peter Broeker and Ernie de Vos were both entered for the 1963 United States Grand Prix with Stebro. Broeker competed and finished seventh, while de Vos did not take part because his car was unavailable.

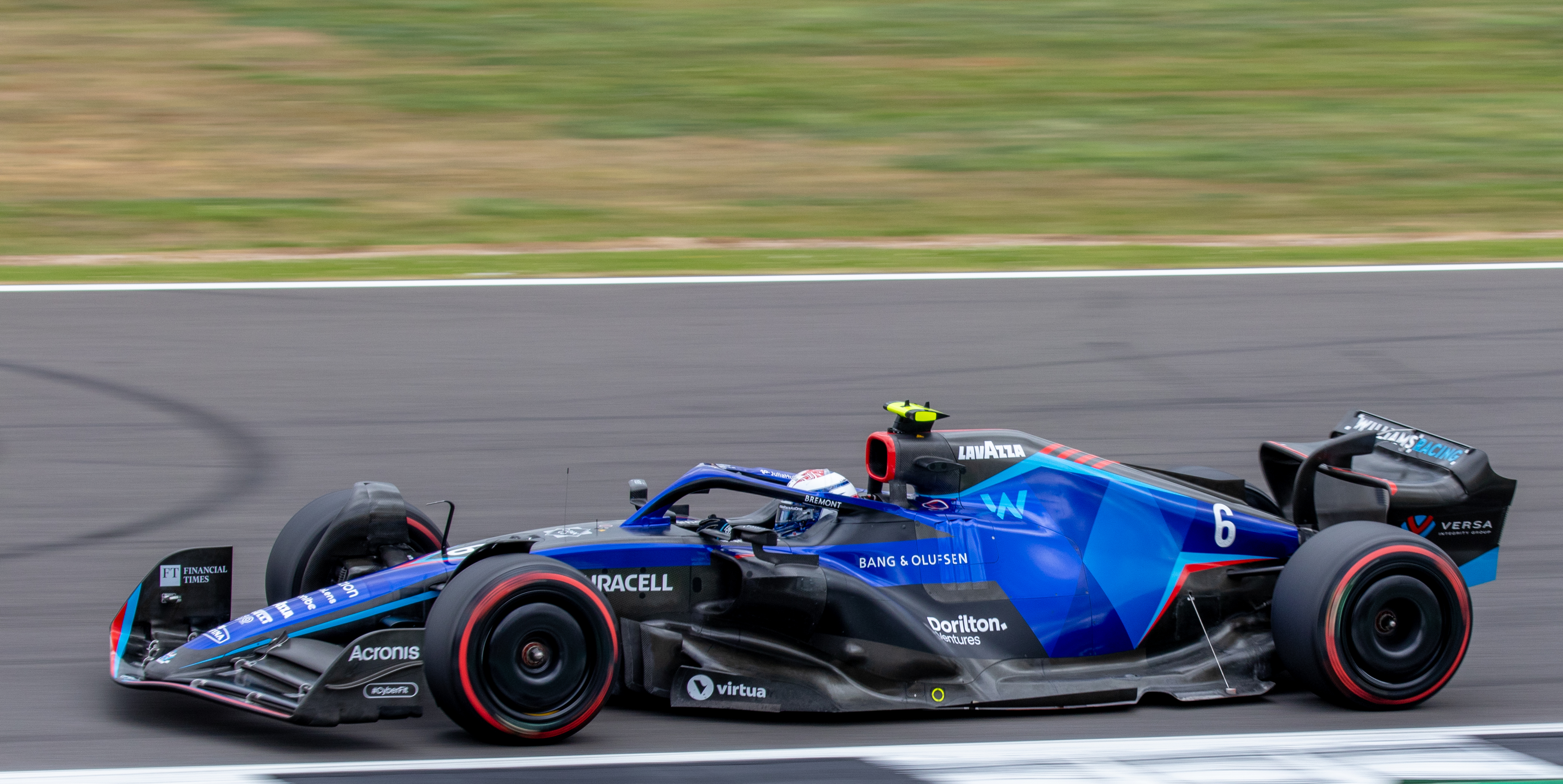
Nicholas Latifi driving for Williams at the 2022 British Grand Prix

Nicholas Latifi raced for Williams for three seasons between 2020 and 2022. He gained 9 championship points in those three years.

== Accomplishments ==
=== World champions ===
There has only been one Formula One World Champion from Canada, Jacques Villeneuve, in the 1997 Formula One season. However, Gilles Villeneuve finished second in the World Driving Championship in the 1979 Formula One season.

=== Points scorers ===
Only four Canadians have scored World Championship points in Formula One; Gilles Villeneuve, his son Jacques Villeneuve, Lance Stroll and Nicholas Latifi. At the 2017 Azerbaijan Grand Prix, Stroll became the youngest rookie to achieve a podium finish in Formula One.

=== At the Canadian Grand Prix ===
Only one Canadian has won the F1 Canadian Grand Prix, Gilles Villeneuve, at the 1978 Canadian Grand Prix.

Lance Stroll would score his first World Championship points at the 2017 Canadian Grand Prix, the 50th anniversary grand prix. He is one of three Canadians to score points at the Canadian Grand Prix, the other two being Jacques Villeneuve and his father Gilles Villeneuve.

Multiple Canadian drivers have participated in the same F1 Canadian Grand Prix on three occasions. The first was at the 1967 Canadian Grand Prix with Eppie Wietzes and Al Pease, the second at the 1969 Canadian Grand Prix, where three Canadian drivers started and Al Pease was disqualified. The third was in 2022, when Lance Stroll and Nicholas Latifi took part in the 2022 Canadian Grand Prix.

== Statistics ==
Drivers	Active Years	Entries	Wins	Podiums	Career Points	Poles	Fastest Laps	Championships
Peter Ryan	1961	1	0	0	0	0	0	-
Peter Broeker	1963	1	0	0	0	0	0	-
Ernie de Vos	1963	1 (0 starts)	0	0	0	0	0	-
Al Pease	1967–1969	3 (2 starts)	0	0	0	0	0	-
Eppie Wietzes	1967, 1974	2	0	0	0	0	0	-
Bill Brack	1968–1969, 1972	3	0	0	0	0	0	-
John Cordts	1969	1	0	0	0	0	0	-
George Eaton	1969–1971	13 (11 starts)	0	0	0	0	0	-
John Cannon	1971	1	0	0	0	0	0	-
Gilles Villeneuve	1977–1982	68 (67 starts)	6	13	101 (107)	2	8	-
Jacques Villeneuve Sr.	1981, 1983	3 (0 starts)	0	0	0	0	0	-
Allen Berg	1986	9	0	0	0	0	0	-
Jacques Villeneuve Jr.	1996–2006	165 (163 starts)	11	23	235	13	9	1 (1997)
Lance Stroll	2017–2026	214 (209 starts)	0	3	325	1	0	-
Nicholas Latifi	2020–2022	61	0	0	9	0	0	-

== See also ==
- List of Formula One Grand Prix winners
