= Ernie de Vos =

Canadian racing driver (1941–2005)

- Born: 1 July 1941; The Hague, Netherlands
- Died: 5 March 2005 (aged 63); St. Petersburg, Florida, U.S.

Formula One World Championship career
- Nationality: (Canada) Canadian
- Active years: 1963
- Team: Canadian Stebro Racing
- Entries: 1 (0 starts)
- Championships: 0
- Wins: 0
- Podiums: 0
- Career points: 0
- Pole positions: 0
- Fastest laps: 0
- First entry: 1963 United States Grand Prix

Ernest Nathan de Vos (1 July 1941 – 5 March 2005) was a Canadian racing driver.

== Career ==
After his family moved from the Netherlands to Canada when he was young, de Vos started his racing career in karts. Moving up to Canadian Formula Junior, he was generally the second fastest driver at the time, behind John Cannon.

He had a brief experience in Formula One when he was entered in the 1963 United States Grand Prix in a second Stebro-Ford carrying #19, although only one car was present at the circuit, with #21. Peter Broeker drove the car in practice and the race, and de Vos and other reserve driver Ludwig Heimrath Sr. did not take part.

De Vos died in a cycling accident in Florida in 2005.

== Complete Formula One results ==
(key)

Year	Entrant	Chassis	Engine	1	2	3	4	5	6	7	8	9	10	WDC	Points
1963	Canadian Stebro Racing	Stebro 4	Ford Straight-4	MON	BEL	NED	FRA	GBR	GER	ITA	USA; DNP	MEX	RSA	NC	0
