= Ernesto Brambilla =

Italian motorcycle racer and racing driver (1934–2020)

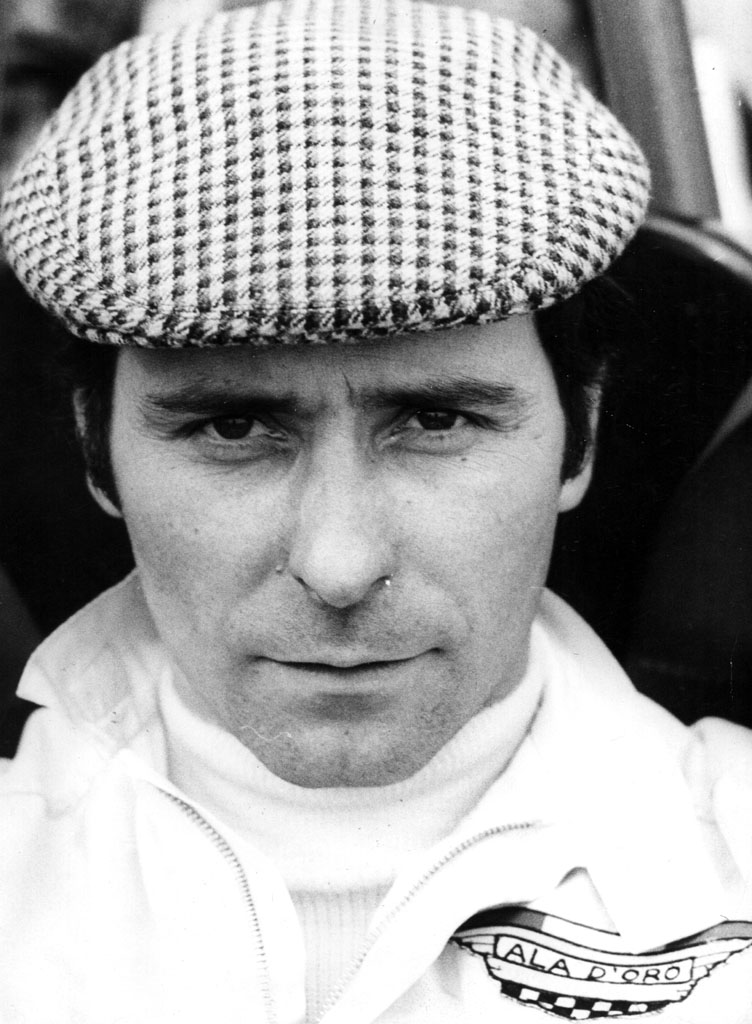
- Nationality: Italian
- Born: 31 January 1934; Monza, Italy
- Died: 3 August 2020 (aged 86); Monza, Italy
Motorcycle racing career statistics
Grand Prix motorcycle racing
Active years	1959, 1961
First race	1959 350cc West German Grand Prix
Last race	1961 350cc East German Grand Prix
Team(s)	MV Agusta, Bianchi
Starts / Wins / Podiums / Poles / F. laps / Points; 2 / 0 / 1 / N/A / 0 / 9

Formula One World Championship career
- Active years: 1963, 1969
- Team(s): Scuderia Centro Sud, Ferrari
- Entries: 2 (0 starts)
- Championships: 0
- Wins: 0
- Podiums: 0
- Career points: 0
- Pole positions: 0
- Fastest laps: 0
- First entry: 1963 Italian Grand Prix
- Last entry: 1969 Italian Grand Prix

Ernesto "Tino" Brambilla (31 January 1934 – 3 August 2020) was a Grand Prix motorcycle road racer and a professional race car driver from Italy. Born in Monza, he was the brother of driver Vittorio Brambilla. In 1959, he finished in tenth place in the 350cc Grand Prix motorcycle season. In 1961, he again finished in tenth place in the 350 class.

Brambilla entered two Formula One Grands Prix, firstly in the 1963 Italian Grand Prix with Scuderia Centro Sud, driving a Cooper, which he failed to qualify. For the 1969 race, he was entered by Ferrari; the car was ultimately driven by Pedro Rodríguez. He is also a two-time winner of the Rome Grand Prix, having won the race in 1966 for Brabham, and 1968 for Ferrari.

Brambilla died on 3 August 2020 in Monza.

== Motorcycle Grand Prix results ==
**Position**	1	2	3	4	5	6
**Points**	8	6	4	3	2	1

(key) (Races in bold indicate pole position; races in italics indicate fastest lap)

Year	Class	Team	1	2	3	4	5	6	7	Points	Rank	Wins
1959	350cc	MV Agusta	FRA	IOM	GER; 3	SWE	ULS	NAT		4	10th	0
1961	350cc	Bianchi	GER	IOM	NED	DDR; 5	ULS	NAT	SWE	5	10th	0

== Complete Formula One results ==
Source: (key)

Year	Entrant	Chassis	Engine	1	2	3	4	5	6	7	8	9	10	11	WDC	Points
1963	Scuderia Centro Sud	Cooper T53	Maserati Straight-4	MON	BEL	NED	FRA	GBR	GER	ITA; DNQ	USA	MEX	RSA		NC	0
1969	Scuderia Ferrari	Ferrari 312/68/69	Ferrari V12	RSA	ESP	MON	NED	FRA	GBR	GER	ITA; DNS	CAN	USA	MEX	NC	0

== See also ==
- Formula One racing
- Grand Prix motorcycle racing

Sporting positions
Preceded by Andrea de Adamich	Italian Formula Three Champion; 1966	Succeeded by Franco Bernabei (1968)
