= Lotus 22 =

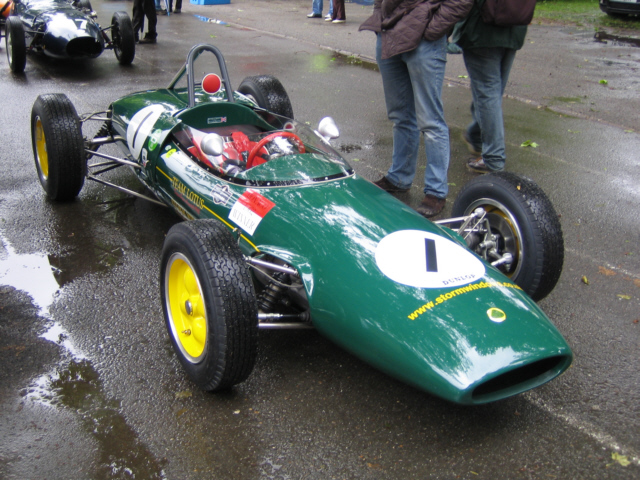

Overview
- Manufacturer: Team Lotus
- Production: 1962-1965

Body and chassis
- Class: Formula Junior
- Body style: Open wheel

Powertrain
- Engine: 1,098 cc (67.0 cu in) Cosworth Mk.IV, Mk.XI

Chronology
- Predecessor: Lotus 20
- Successor: Lotus 27

The Lotus 22 was a racing car built by Lotus cars in 1962, and a total of 77 cars were built. It was developed from the 1962 Lotus 20, with the major differences that it had disc brakes all round, a top link and the 'rubber doughnut' to the rear suspension and a dry sump engine that was canted over to lower the centre of gravity. Also notable is the smoother bodywork covering the engine, compared to the boxy design of the 20.

The 22 is a single-seat race car primarily for the Formula Junior series and most had a 1,098 cc (67.0 cu in) Cosworth Mk.IV or Mk.XI engine with about 100 hp (70 kW). However, seven of the Lotus 22s were built with the then newly introduced 1,498 cc (91.4 cu in) Lotus TwinCam engine (designed for the Lotus Elan) for Formule Libre. Unlike the 20, the 22 received outboard mounted disc brakes all around as standard equipment. It was available with four-speed transmissions from either Renault or Volkswagen. For cars with the Renault transmission, the shifter was mounted on the right, while it was on the left side for those with the German box. The 22 was very successful and the works car driven by Peter Arundell won nearly 75% of the races for the FIA Formula Junior European championship in 1962. The car was also successful in 1963, the final year of FJr, and up against the new Lotus 27, a full monocoque car, the 22 won several races early in the season before the stiffness problems that plagued the 27 were solved.

The 22 chassis was later reintroduced several times, although modified, as other "new" Lotus models becoming first the Lotus 31 F3 car in 1964 and then, most famously, the Lotus 51 in 1967, the first Formula Ford race car created for the Jim Russell racing school in England.

The Lotus 22 was the car from which the Lotus 23 was derived, being essentially a two-seat 22 widened in the middle but using the same front and rear suspension and gearbox as the 22. The 23's introduction at the Nürburgring 1000km in 1962 was made legendary by Jim Clark, who led many laps in the tiny 1,000-pound 23, with only a 1,498 cc (91.4 cu in) engine, against cars with many times the displacement, at one point leading by a minute or more in the wet.

A Lotus 22 was entered in the 1963 and 1965 South African Grands Prix for Brausch Niemann finishing in 14th place (20 laps down) and failing to qualify respectively.

== Complete Formula One World Championship results ==
Year	Entrant	Engine	Tyres	Drivers	1	2	3	4	5	6	7	8	9	10	Points	WCC
1963	Ted Lanfear	Ford L4	D		MON	BEL	NED	FRA	GBR	GER	ITA	USA	MEX	RSA	0	NC
1963	Ted Lanfear	Ford L4	D	Brausch Niemann										14	0	NC
1965	Ted Lanfear	Ford L4	D		RSA	MON	BEL	FRA	GBR	NED	GER	ITA	USA	MEX	0	NC
1965	Ted Lanfear	Ford L4	D	Brausch Niemann	DNQ										0	NC
