= Brausch Niemann =

South African racing driver (born 1939)

- Born: 7 January 1939 (age 87); Durban, South Africa

Formula One World Championship career
- Nationality: (South Africa) South African
- Active years: 1963, 1965
- Team: non-works Lotus
- Entries: 2 (1 start)
- Championships: 0
- Wins: 0
- Podiums: 0
- Career points: 0
- Pole positions: 0
- Fastest laps: 0
- First entry: 1963 South African Grand Prix
- Last entry: 1965 South African Grand Prix

Ambraüsus "Brausch" Niemann (born 7 January 1939) is a former racing driver from South Africa. He participated in two Formula One World Championship Grands Prix in 1963 and 1965, both in his home country, driving a privately entered Lotus. He managed to qualify for the first of these, finishing 14th and scoring no championship points.

After success in Formula Junior in the mid-1960s, Niemann switched to enduro motor cycle racing, winning the South African championship in 1979.

== Racing record ==
=== Complete Formula One World Championship results ===
(key)

Year	Entrant	Chassis	Engine	1	2	3	4	5	6	7	8	9	10	WDC	Points
1963	Ted Lanfear	Lotus 22	Ford Straight-4	MON	BEL	NED	FRA	GBR	GER	ITA	USA	MEX	RSA; 14	NC	0
1965	Ted Lanfear	Lotus 22	Ford Straight-4	RSA; DNQ	MON	BEL	FRA	GBR	NED	GER	ITA	USA	MEX	NC	0

=== Complete British Saloon Car Championship results ===
(key) (Races in bold indicate pole position; races in italics indicate fastest lap.)

Year	Team	Car	Class	1	2	3	4	5	6	7	8	DC	Pts	Class
1964	John Willment Automobiles	Ford Cortina Lotus	B	SNE	GOO	OUL	AIN	SIL	CRY; 6†	BRH	OUL	NC	0	NC

† Events with 2 races staged for the different classes.
