= Frank Dochnal =

American racing driver (1920–2010)

- Born: October 8, 1920
- Died: July 7, 2010 (aged 89)

Formula One World Championship career
- Nationality: (United States) American
- Active years: 1963
- Team: non-works Cooper
- Entries: 1 (0 starts)
- Championships: 0
- Wins: 0
- Podiums: 0
- Career points: 0
- Pole positions: 0
- Fastest laps: 0
- First entry: 1963 Mexican Grand Prix

Frank Jack Dochnal (October 8, 1920 – July 7, 2010) was a race car driver from St. Louis, Missouri, United States. He had some success in local racing in Missouri before making a single attempt to qualify for a Formula One Grand Prix at the age of 43, with a Cooper T51 in the 1963 Mexican Grand Prix. Unfortunately, this bid failed after he crashed during unofficial practice. At this point, he retired from race driving and continued to work as a race mechanic. He later worked for Howard Hughes and as a technical official for USAC.

== Complete Formula One results ==
(key)

Year	Entrant	Chassis	Engine	1	2	3	4	5	6	7	8	9	10	WDC	Points
1963	Frank Dochnal	Cooper T51	Climax Straight-4	MON	BEL	NED	FRA	GBR	GER	ITA	USA	MEX; DNQ	RSA	NC	0
