= Peter Broeker =

Canadian racing driver (1926–1980)

- Born: 15 May 1926; Germany
- Died: 4 November 1980 (aged 54); Ottawa, Canada

Formula One World Championship career
- Nationality: Canadian
- Active years: 1963
- Team: Stebro
- Entries: 1
- Championships: 0
- Wins: 0
- Podiums: 0
- Career points: 0
- Pole positions: 0
- Fastest laps: 0
- First entry: 1963 United States Grand Prix

Peter "Pete" William Broeker (15 May 1926 - 4 November 1980) was a racing driver from Canada. He participated in one World Championship Formula One Grand Prix, the 1963 United States Grand Prix, driving a Stebro, a car of his own construction. He finished seventh, albeit 22 laps down, and scored no championship points. According to the Toronto Star at the time: "Broeker, first Canadian ever to compete in a world championship Formula One race in a Canadian-built car, finished seventh over-all despite giving away more than 80 horsepower to the rest of the field of 21." He owned Stebro, an aftermarkets performance parts company that is still in operation.

In 1973, Broeker wrote and published Olympic Coins: From Antiquity to the Present. He held US citizenship as well as Canadian.

== Complete Formula One results ==
(key)

Year	Entrant	Chassis	Engine	1	2	3	4	5	6	7	8	9	10	WDC	Points
1963	Canadian Stebro Racing	Stebro 4	Ford Straight-4	MON	BEL	NED	FRA	GBR	GER	ITA	USA; 7	MEX	RSA	NC	0
