= Stebro =

Canadian constructor of Formula Junior racing cars

Stebro was a Canadian constructor of Formula Junior racing cars. The team, founded by John Stevens and Peter Broeker, also competed in one Formula One race, the 1963 United States Grand Prix, where their one car finished in seventh place.

Peter Broeker, the owner and president of a firm of automotive accessory manufacturers, designed and built the Stebros in his Montreal plant, to promote the company in the Canadian market. A Stebro Formula Junior chassis, fitted with an enlarged Ford 105E engine appeared in one Formula One Grand Prix, the 1963 United States Grand Prix. The engine, including a Hewland gearbox, was the only alteration, with the Weber Ford 1,500 c.c. engine developing 110 hp (82 kW). The car was driven by Broeker and, against the more powerful Formula One cars of the day, finished in seventh place, completing 88 of the 110 laps. Broeker's Stebro later won the all-formula sprint at the Indian Summer Trophy races at Mosport on September 4, 1965.

Around 1959, Peter Broeker had introduced the Stebro brand of performance exhaust systems for imported cars. Initially, these were imported from Italy through an association with Frank Reisner (who was in the initial stages of creating Intermeccanica). Broeker quickly set up a plant to fabricate these exhaust systems in Pointe Claire, Quebec, and eventually moved to eastern Ontario. After ending the race program, Stebro remained a manufacturer of performance exhaust systems for European and American cars until some point after Broeker's death in 1980. Two decades later, the Stebro name and jigs were eventually purchased by a Swiss mechanic called Andy Petschenig; he reintroduced the Stebro brand, now featuring stainless steel and concentrating at first on Italian automobile applications. Their products were developed and manufactured from a factory near Ottawa, Ontario, Canada. Problems with delivery hurt their reputation and the new Stebro went out of business in 2013.

== Motor racing ==
Peter Broeker moved to Canada with his family at the end of World War II. He opened an automotive repair business in Hamilton, Ontario, moving to Montreal later in the fifties, where he opened the Stebro Garage. Though a fan of racing, it was not until his move to Montreal that he became serious with the sport, especially single seat formula car racing. Soon he was supply the racing world with customized exhaust systems to improve performance, and later would become a race car constructor.

The Stebro Mark 1, the first of Stebro, was built in 1960 in the Stebro repair garage on McGill street in Montreal. It had a front engine formula junior design powered by a BMC engine and drive train. The second evolution of the Stebro was the Mark II, a mid-engine design also powered by BMC. The Mark III was a modified Sadler MKV sports racer. The Sadler was modified by adding eight inches to the wheelbase and fitted with a conventional transaxle.

The Mark IV was built over the winter in 1962 and 1963. It featured a space frame chassis made of thin wall chrome-moly tubing. The body was clothed in aluminum and original powered by a modified Ford FJ engine mated to a Hewland MKIV five speed gearbox. In the front was a conventional upper and lower A-arm suspension setup, with a reversed lower A-arm and upper top link in the rear. Girling brakes, courtesy of a Lotus 21 F1 car, could be found at all four corners. The large fuel tank meant it could race more than the traditional 20 lap Formula Junior race.

Broeker made a deal with Martin engines in England to purchase a supply of the F1 motors they were developing. These new powerplants were based on the recently introduced Ford of England 1500cc five bearing block. Broeker intended to build two cars and enter them in the 1963 United States Grand Prix. His intended drivers were to be John Cannon and Ernie DeVos, who had considerable success in FJ in Canada.

Like so many stories, the build did not go as planned and delays meant changes to the schedule. These delays meant there was not time to build two Mark IVs, so Broeker's entry for the US GP was for one Mark IV and one Mark II, both fitted with Martin Ford Power. John Cannon tested the Mark IV and found it to be a capable machine, but then left Canada to race for John Mecom in the United States. Broeker then campaigned the Mark IV as an FJ for the remainder of the 1963 season.

The Martin F1 engine turned out to be troublesome and unreliable. As the dates for the US GP approached (at the time, the United States Grand Prix was held in September), Broeker kept asking for his motors, as he had already paid for them and was awaiting delivery. Martin continued to put off Broeker as they aggressively worked to resolve the engine problems. The engine was not ready in time, and Broeker was forced to find an alternative. He built up an essentially stock Ford 1500cc engine, using whatever performance products he could find from his current race motors, and trailered the car down to Watkins Glen. Enrie DeVos, realizing the car was seriously lacking in power, left - leaving Broeker as the team's driver.

During practice, the front oil seal failed on the hastily built motor, causing oil to flow onto the track. He was able to qualify the car, just three and a half seconds slower than Baghetti in the ATS.

After about three laps into the race, the gearbox jammed in fourth gear. Broeker continued to race, though the car was down on power and not able to achieve its full speed due to the gearbox jam. As the checkered flag fell, Broeker was classified in seventh place, making him the first Canadian to compete in and finish a World Championship Grand Prix. The Stebro became the first and only Canadian-built car to do the same.

The following season, Broeker brought the car to Europe for the inaugural European Championship Formula II season. Power was from an 1100cc Martin Ford Motor, which would prove to be lacking compared to the finely tuned Cosworth engines. The best results were 8th places at Hockenhiem and Zeltwig.

Broeker returned to Canada, and in preparation for the 1965 season, he modified the Mark IV slightly, giving it a larger radiator, modified bodywork, and a Lotus Ford twin cam motor. In this guise, the car won many of its outings. For the next three years, the car accumulated over 100 victories across North America in Formula Libre and Formula B class races.

At a race in late September 1968, Broeker crashed the Stebro at the St. Jovite track. The car was badly damaged, but Broker was uninjured. The car was quickly rebuilt and tested, only to reveal problems with the handling. Instead of building a new car, Broeker purchased a British Chevron. Broeker would continue to race until his death in 1980.

Broeker had kept the Mark IV as a back-up car in case he needed it. After his death, it remained outside where it began deteriorating quickly. The current owner purchased the car in 1985 and began a complete restoration. After the work was completed, it was entered in a race in late September 1988. It won the vintage class at the Canadian Run Offs held at St. Jovite.

The car is currently powered by a Ford 1500cc, just like it was fitted when it raced in the US GP in 1963. It has its original gearbox and other major mechanical components. The bodywork is the original 1965 modified, including the paint job and the dents and dings of decades of racing. There is a modern roll bar, a fuel cell, fire extinguisher system, and seat belts to comply with modern racing requirements.

In period the Stebro raced in Formula Junior, F1, F2, Formula Libre and Formula B between 1963 - 1968.

In 2009, the car was offered for sale by Bonhams Auction at the Exceptional Motorcars and Automobilia sale in Carmel, CA. It was thought that it would sell for $70,000 - 100,000, but it left the auction unsold.

== Complete Formula One World Championship results ==
(key) (results in bold indicate pole position; results in italics indicate fastest lap)

Year	Chassis	Engine	Tyres	Driver	1	2	3	4	5	6	7	8	9	10	Points	WCC
1963	Stebro Mk IV (FJ)	Ford S4	**D**		MON	BEL	NED	FRA	GBR	GER	ITA	USA	MEX	RSA	**0**	**NC**
1963	Stebro Mk IV (FJ)	Ford S4	**D**	Peter Broeker								7			**0**	**NC**

== See also ==
- John Cannon
