= 1963 Formula One season =

17th season of FIA Formula One motor racing

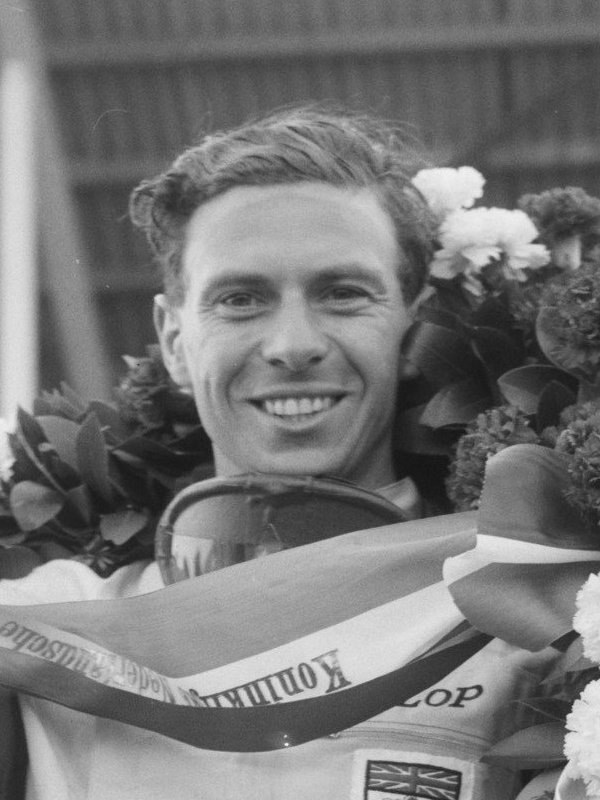
Jim Clark won the first of his two Formula One World Championships, driving a Lotus-Climax.

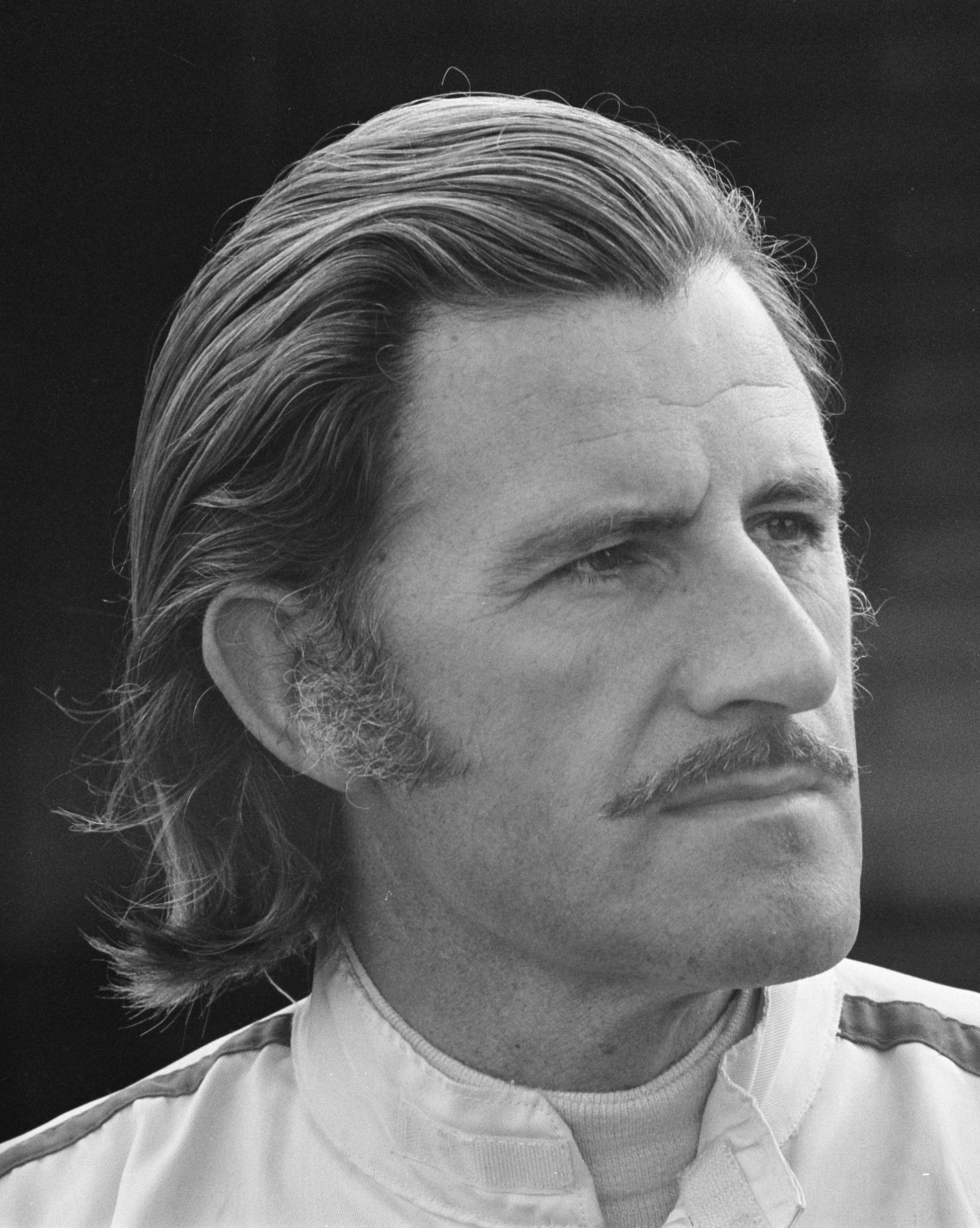
Defending Champion Graham Hill finished as runner-up in the World Drivers' Championship.

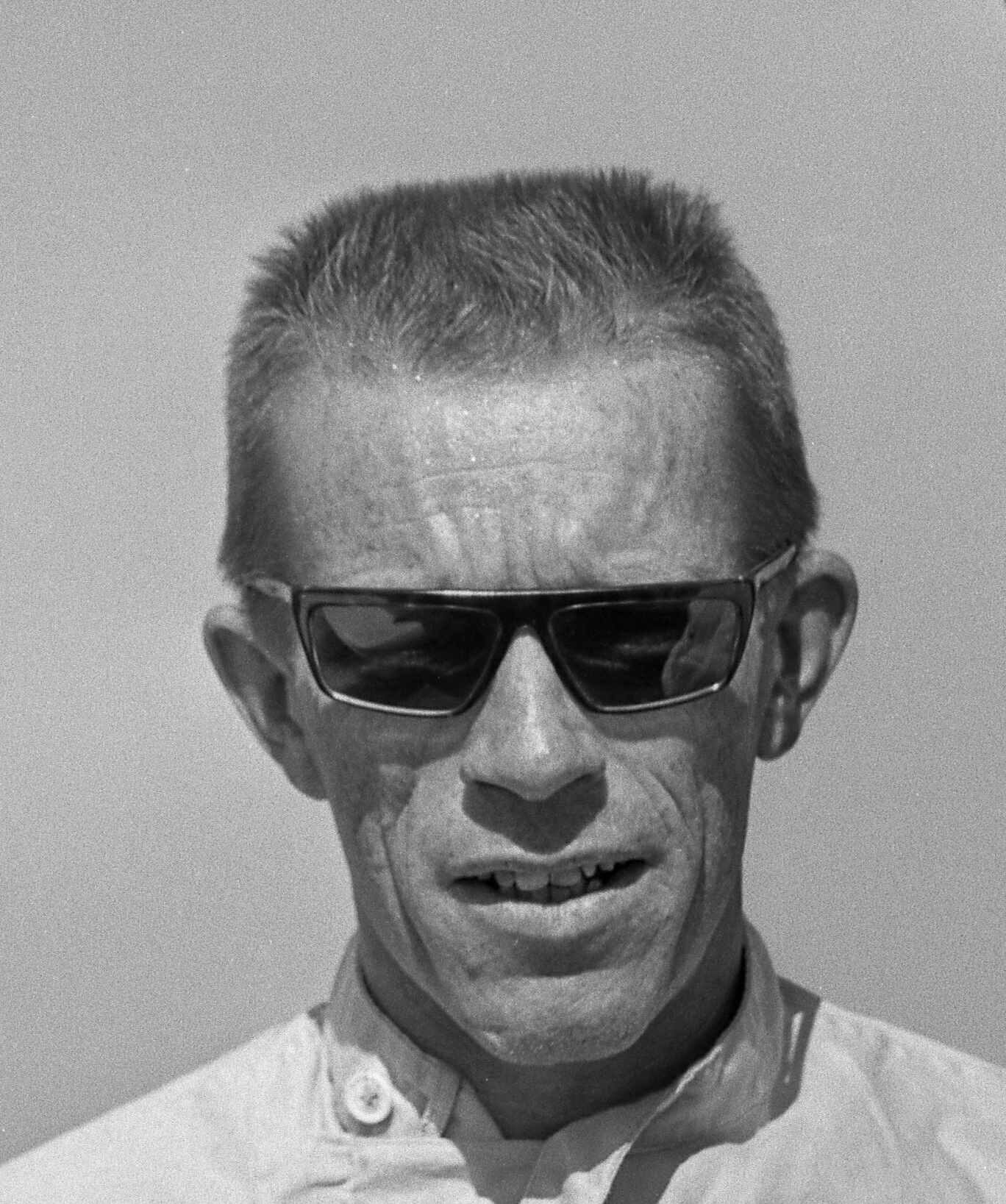
Richie Ginther finished third in the World Drivers' Championship.

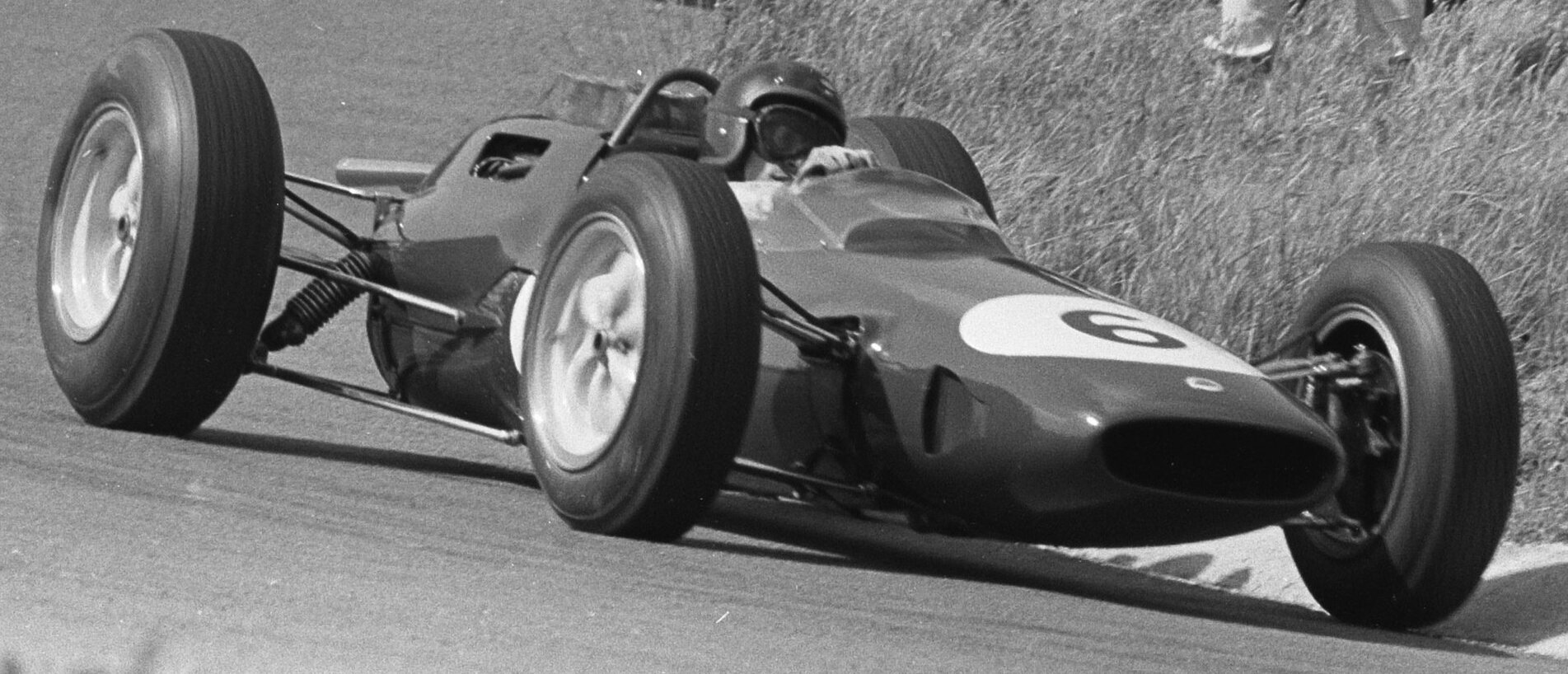
Lotus won the International Cup for F1 Manufacturers with the Lotus 25.

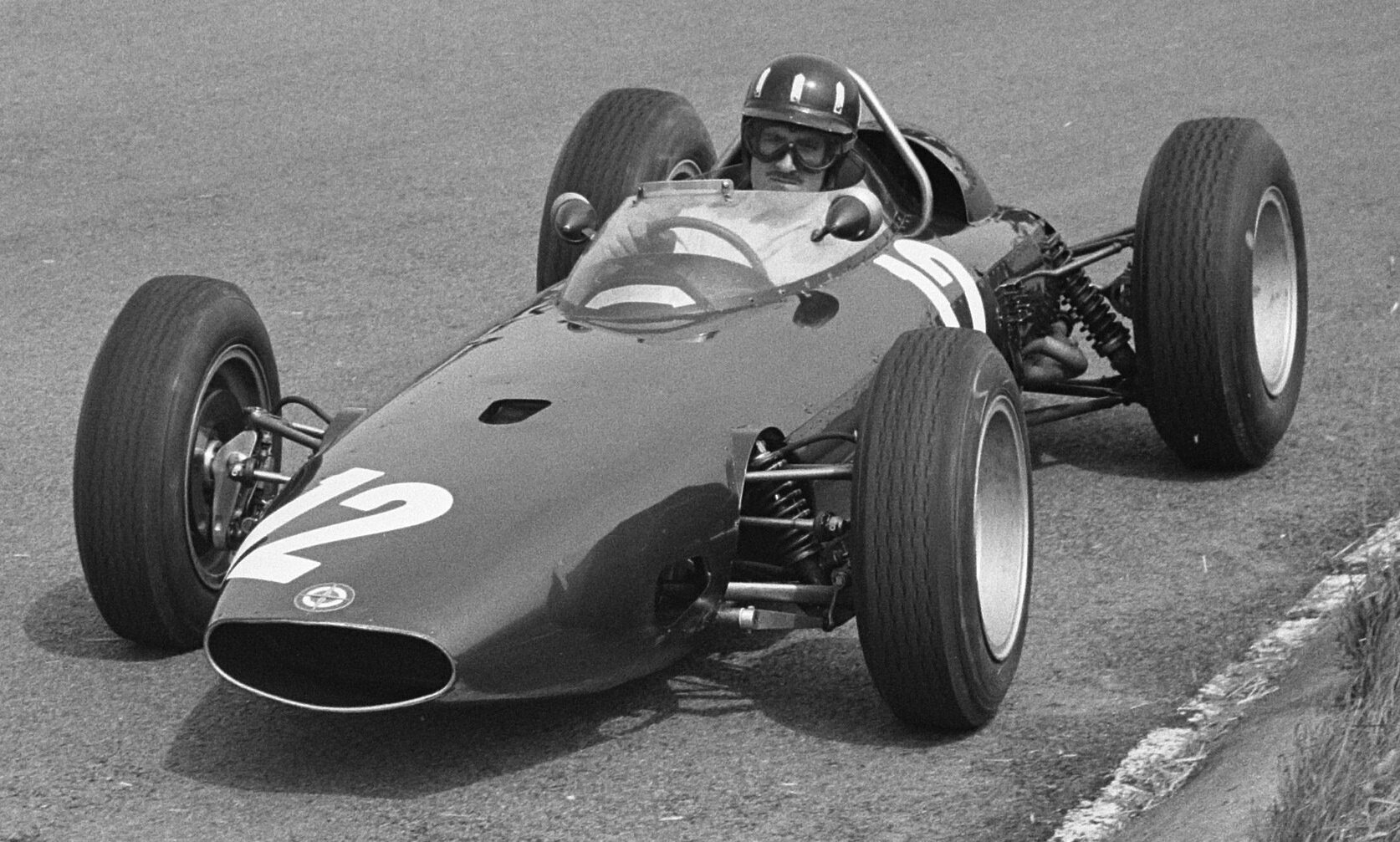
BRM finished second with the BRM P57 & P61.

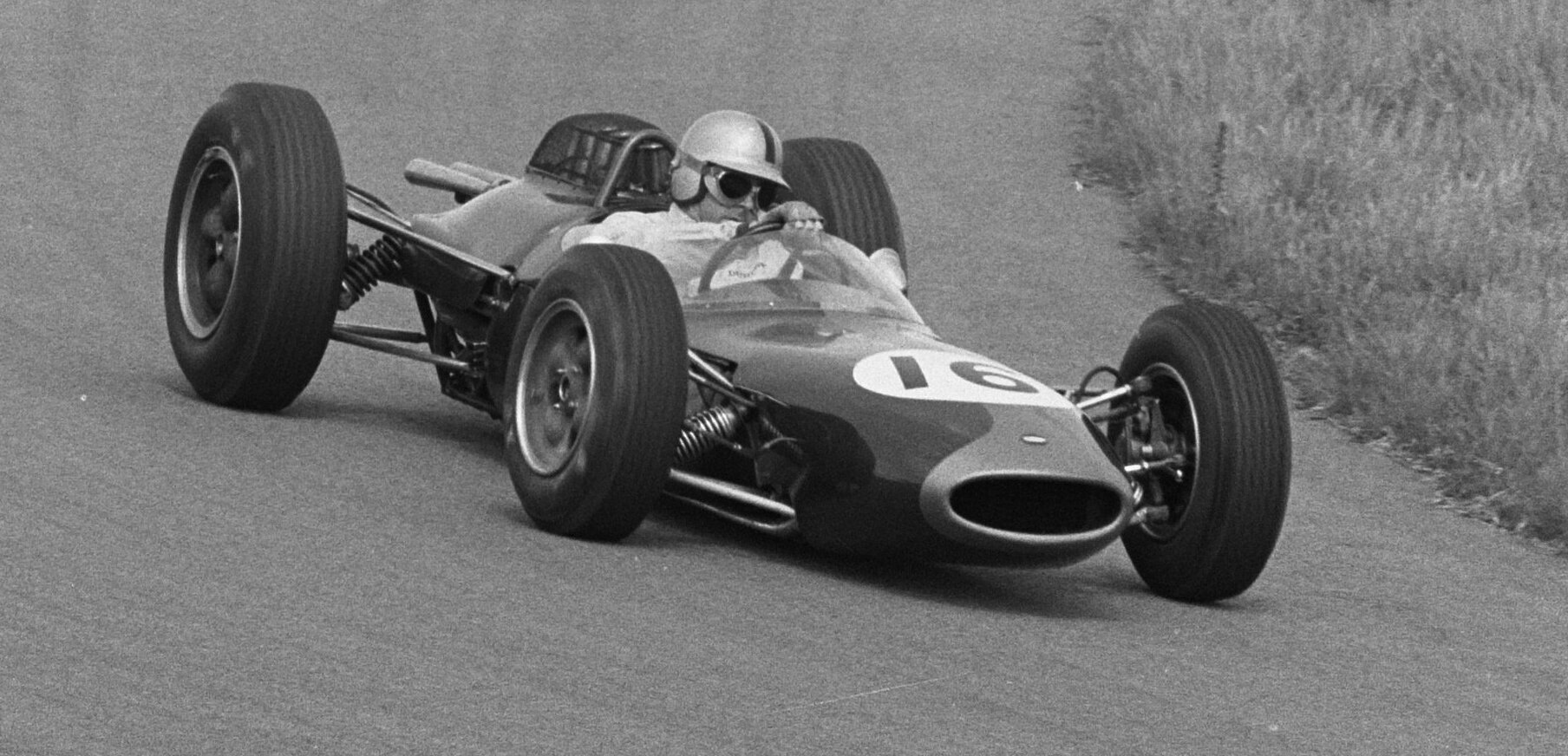
Brabham finished third in with the Brabham BT3, BT7 & Lotus 25.

The 1963 Formula One season was the 17th season of FIA Formula One motor racing. It featured the 14th World Championship of Drivers, the 6th International Cup for F1 Manufacturers, and numerous non-championship Formula One races. The World Championship was contested over ten races between 26 May and 28 December 1963.

Jim Clark driving for Lotus won his first Drivers' Championship with three races to go. He won seven races in the championship, a number that would not be beaten until 1988, when Ayrton Senna won eight, and a win percentage that nearly beat Alberto Ascari's record from 1952. Lotus also won the Manufacturers' Championship for the first time.

Every pole position and race in the 1963 championship were won by British drivers, the first time that this was achieved by any single nation. (Italy is sometimes considered to have achieved this feat in 1952, but this only goes if the Indianapolis 500 is excluded from the statistic.)

== Teams and drivers ==
The following teams and drivers competed in the 1963 FIA World Championship. All teams competed with tyres supplied by Dunlop.

Entrant	Constructor	Chassis	Engine	Driver	Rounds
(United Kingdom) Brabham Racing Organisation	Lotus-Climax	25	Climax FWMV 1.5 V8	(Australia) Jack Brabham	1
(United Kingdom) Brabham Racing Organisation	Brabham-Climax	BT7; BT3	Climax FWMV 1.5 V8	(Australia) Jack Brabham	2–10
(United Kingdom) Brabham Racing Organisation	Brabham-Climax	BT7; BT3	Climax FWMV 1.5 V8	(United States) Dan Gurney	All
(United Kingdom) Owen Racing Organisation	BRM	P57; P61	BRM P56 1.5 V8	(United States) Richie Ginther	All
(United Kingdom) Owen Racing Organisation	BRM	P57; P61	BRM P56 1.5 V8	(United Kingdom) Graham Hill	All
(United Kingdom) Cooper Car Company	Cooper-Climax	T66	Climax FWMV 1.5 V8	(New Zealand) Bruce McLaren	All
(United Kingdom) Cooper Car Company	Cooper-Climax	T66	Climax FWMV 1.5 V8	(South Africa) Tony Maggs	All
(United Kingdom) Team Lotus	Lotus-Climax	25	Climax FWMV 1.5 V8	(United Kingdom) Jim Clark	All
(United Kingdom) Team Lotus	Lotus-Climax	25	Climax FWMV 1.5 V8	(United Kingdom) Trevor Taylor	1–6, 8–10
(United Kingdom) Team Lotus	Lotus-Climax	25	Climax FWMV 1.5 V8	(United Kingdom) Peter Arundell	4
(United Kingdom) Team Lotus	Lotus-Climax	25	Climax FWMV 1.5 V8	(United Kingdom) Mike Spence	7
(United Kingdom) Team Lotus	Lotus-Climax	25	Climax FWMV 1.5 V8	(Mexico) Pedro Rodríguez	8–9
(United Kingdom) R.R.C. Walker Racing Team	Cooper-Climax	T60; T66	Climax FWMV 1.5 V8	(Sweden) Jo Bonnier	All
(United Kingdom) British Racing Partnership	Lotus-BRM	24	BRM P56 1.5 V8	(United States) Jim Hall	1–9
(United Kingdom) British Racing Partnership	Lotus-BRM	24	BRM P56 1.5 V8	(United Kingdom) Innes Ireland	1, 6
(United Kingdom) British Racing Partnership	BRP-BRM	Mk 1	BRM P56 1.5 V8	(United Kingdom) Innes Ireland	2–5, 7
(United Kingdom) Reg Parnell Racing	Lola-Climax	Mk4A	Climax FWMV 1.5 V8	(New Zealand) Chris Amon	1–7
(United Kingdom) Reg Parnell Racing	Lola-Climax	Mk4A	Climax FWMV 1.5 V8	(France) Maurice Trintignant	1
(United Kingdom) Reg Parnell Racing	Lola-Climax	Mk4A	Climax FWMV 1.5 V8	(Belgium) Lucien Bianchi	2
(United Kingdom) Reg Parnell Racing	Lola-Climax	Mk4A	Climax FWMV 1.5 V8	(United Kingdom) Mike Hailwood	7
(United Kingdom) Reg Parnell Racing	Lola-Climax	Mk4A	Climax FWMV 1.5 V8	(United States) Masten Gregory	8–9
(United Kingdom) Reg Parnell Racing	Lotus-Climax	24	Climax FWMV 1.5 V8	(France) Maurice Trintignant	4
(United Kingdom) Reg Parnell Racing	Lotus-Climax	24	Climax FWMV 1.5 V8	(United Kingdom) Mike Hailwood	5
(United Kingdom) Reg Parnell Racing	Lotus-BRM	24	BRM P56 1.5 V8	(United States) Masten Gregory	5
(United Kingdom) Reg Parnell Racing	Lotus-BRM	24	BRM P56 1.5 V8	(United States) Rodger Ward	8
(United Kingdom) Reg Parnell Racing	Lotus-BRM	24	BRM P56 1.5 V8	(United States) Hap Sharp	8–9
(United Kingdom) Reg Parnell Racing	Lotus-BRM	24	BRM P56 1.5 V8	(New Zealand) Chris Amon	9
(Italy) Scuderia Ferrari SpA SEFAC	Ferrari	156	Ferrari 178 1.5 V6	(Belgium) Willy Mairesse	1–2, 6
(Italy) Scuderia Ferrari SpA SEFAC	Ferrari	156	Ferrari 178 1.5 V6	(United Kingdom) John Surtees	All
(Italy) Scuderia Ferrari SpA SEFAC	Ferrari	156	Ferrari 178 1.5 V6	(Italy) Ludovico Scarfiotti	3–4
(Italy) Scuderia Ferrari SpA SEFAC	Ferrari	156	Ferrari 178 1.5 V6	(Italy) Lorenzo Bandini	7–10
(France) Bernard Collomb	Lotus-Climax	24	Climax FWMV 1.5 V8	(France) Bernard Collomb	1, 6
(Switzerland) Siffert Racing Team	Lotus-BRM	24	BRM P56 1.5 V8	(Switzerland) Jo Siffert	1–9
(United Kingdom) Scirocco Powell Racing Cars	Scirocco-BRM	SP	BRM P56 1.5 V8	(United States) Tony Settember	2, 4–7
(United Kingdom) Scirocco Powell Racing Cars	Scirocco-BRM	SP	BRM P56 1.5 V8	(United Kingdom) Ian Burgess	5–6
(Italy) Automobili Turismo e Sport	ATS	100	ATS 100 1.5 V8	(United States) Phil Hill	2–3, 7–9
(Italy) Automobili Turismo e Sport	ATS	100	ATS 100 1.5 V8	(Italy) Giancarlo Baghetti	2–3, 7–9
(Netherlands) Ecurie Maarsbergen	Porsche	718	Porsche 547/3 1.5 F4	(Netherlands) Carel Godin de Beaufort	2–3, 5–10
(Netherlands) Ecurie Maarsbergen	Porsche	718	Porsche 547/3 1.5 F4	(West Germany) Gerhard Mitter	3, 6
(Switzerland) Ecurie Filipinetti	Lotus-BRM	24	BRM P56 1.5 V8	(United States) Phil Hill	4
(Italy) Scuderia Centro Sud	BRM	P57	BRM P56 1.5 V8	(Italy) Lorenzo Bandini	4–6
(Italy) Scuderia Centro Sud	BRM	P57	BRM P56 1.5 V8	(France) Maurice Trintignant	7
(Italy) Scuderia Centro Sud	BRM	P57	BRM P56 1.5 V8	(Mexico) Moisés Solana	9
(Italy) Scuderia Centro Sud	Cooper-Climax	T60	Climax FWMV 1.5 V8	(Portugal) Mário de Araújo Cabral	6–7
(Italy) Scuderia Centro Sud	Cooper-Maserati	T53	Maserati 6-1500 1.5 L4	(Italy) Ernesto Brambilla	7
(United Kingdom) Tim Parnell	Lotus-BRM	24	BRM P56 1.5 V8	(United States) Masten Gregory	4, 7
(United Kingdom) Tim Parnell	Lola-Climax	Mk4	Climax FWMV 1.5 V8	(United Kingdom) John Campbell-Jones	5
(United Kingdom) Tim Parnell	Lotus-Climax	18/21	Climax FWMV 1.5 V8	(Belgium) André Pilette	6
(United Kingdom) Tim Parnell	Lotus-Climax	18/21	Climax FWMV 1.5 V8	(United Kingdom) Tim Parnell	6
(United Kingdom) DW Racing Enterprises	Lola-Climax	Mk4	Climax FWMV 1.5 V8	(United Kingdom) Bob Anderson	5, 7
(United Kingdom) Ian Raby Racing	Gilby-BRM	62	BRM P56 1.5 V8	(United Kingdom) Ian Raby	5–7
(West Germany) Kurt Kuhnke	Lotus-Borgward	18	Borgward 1500 RS 1.5 L4	(West Germany) Kurt Kuhnke	6
(Italy) Scuderia Settecolli	De Tomaso-Ferrari	F1	Ferrari 178 1.5 V6	(Italy) Roberto Lippi	7
(Belgium) André Pilette	Lotus-Climax	18/21	Climax FPF 1.5 L4	(Belgium) André Pilette	7
(Canada) Canadian Stebro Racing	Stebro-Ford	Mk IV	Ford 109E 1.5 L4	(Canada) Peter Broeker	8
(United States) Frank Dochnal	Cooper-Climax	T51	Climax FPF 1.5 L4	(United States) Frank Dochnal	9
(South Africa) Lawson Organisation	Lotus-Climax	21	Climax FPF 1.5 L4	(South Africa) Ernie Pieterse	10
(South Africa) Selby Auto Spares	Lotus-BRM	24	BRM P56 1.5 V8	(South Africa) Paddy Driver	10
(South Africa) Otelle Nucci	LDS-Alfa Romeo	Mk 1	Alfa Romeo Giulietta 1.5 L4	(South Africa) Doug Serrurier	10
(South Africa) Otelle Nucci	Alfa Special-Alfa Romeo	Special	Alfa Romeo Giulietta 1.5 L4	(South Africa) Peter de Klerk	10
(Federation of Rhodesia and Nyasaland) John Love	Cooper-Climax	T55	Climax FPF 1.5 L4	(Federation of Rhodesia and Nyasaland) John Love	10
(Federation of Rhodesia and Nyasaland) Sam Tingle	LDS-Alfa Romeo	Mk 1	Alfa Romeo Giulietta 1.5 L4	(Federation of Rhodesia and Nyasaland) Sam Tingle	10
(South Africa) Ted Lanfear	Lotus-Ford	22	Ford 109E 1.5 L4	(South Africa) Brausch Niemann	10
(United Kingdom) David Prophet	Brabham-Ford	BT6	Ford 109E 1.5 L4	(United Kingdom) David Prophet	10
(South Africa) Scuderia Lupini	Cooper-Maserati	T51	Maserati 6-1500 1.5 L4	(South Africa) Trevor Blokdyk	10

=== Team and driver changes ===
- Porsche withdrew their works team after 1962, choosing to focus on their road-going sports cars. Ex-driver Jo Bonnier signed with Rob Walker's private team, while Dan Gurney signed with the relatively new team of double World Champion Jack Brabham. This left only the private Porsche driven by Carel Godin de Beaufort.
- 1961 champion Phil Hill and his teammate Giancarlo Baghetti left Scuderia Ferrari after 1962 to go to ATS. The new team was formed by ex-Ferrari employees, including chief engineers Carlo Chiti and Giotto Bizzarrini, after the "palace revolt" of 1961.
- John Surtees signed with Ferrari in 1963, leaving Reg Parnell to search for new drivers, which he found in veteran Maurice Trintignant and debutant Chris Amon.

==== Mid-season changes ====
- Ferrari hired Belgian Willy Mairesse and Italian Ludovico Scarfiotti to share the role of teammate to John Surtees. Mairesse suffered a heavy crash in the German Grand Prix and broke his arm. 1962 Ferrari driver Lorenzo Bandini was brought in to finish the season.
- Lotus driver Trevor Taylor crashed out of the (non-championship) 1963 Mediterranean Grand Prix at Enna-Pergusa. He was thrown out of his car, which then caught fire. He escaped with fairly minor injuries but missed the Italian Grand Prix. Mike Spence substituted for him.

== Calendar ==
Round	Grand Prix	Circuit	Date
1	Monaco Grand Prix	Circuit de Monaco, Monte Carlo	26 May
2	Belgian Grand Prix	(Belgium) Circuit de Spa-Francorchamps, Stavelot	9 June
3	Dutch Grand Prix	(Netherlands) Circuit Zandvoort, Zandvoort	23 June
4	French Grand Prix	(France) Reims-Gueux, Gueux	30 June
5	British Grand Prix	(United Kingdom) Silverstone Circuit, Silverstone	20 July
6	German Grand Prix	(West Germany) Nürburgring, Nürburg	4 August
7	Italian Grand Prix	(Italy) Autodromo Nazionale di Monza, Monza	8 September
8	United States Grand Prix	(United States) Watkins Glen International, New York	6 October
9	Mexican Grand Prix	Magdalena Mixhuca, Mexico City	27 October
10	South African Grand Prix	(South Africa) Prince George Circuit, East London	28 December

=== Calendar changes ===
- The Dutch Grand Prix was organised a month later than in 1962, moving it back to be the third race in the championship.
- The French Grand Prix was moved back to Reims-Gueux. It would alternate to host the GP with Rouen-Les-Essarts until 1964.
- The British Grand Prix was moved from Aintree to Silverstone. Aintree had alternated with Silverstone since 1955, but 1962 was the last time that they hosted F1.
- The Mexican Grand Prix was added to the calendar and was held at the Magdalena Mixhuca circuit in Mexico City.

== Championship report ==
=== Rounds 1 to 3 ===
The Monaco Grand Prix received the honorary title of European Grand Prix and, more importantly, functioned as the 1963 season opener. With little driver changes in the front-running teams and constructors withholding to introduce new designs to the narrow streets of Monte Carlo, the battle between the 1962 championship protagonists was expected to restart. Only five drivers were guaranteed a starting place: the previous World Champions or winners of the Monaco Grand Prix. The rest had to fight in qualifying over the remaining eleven spaces. 1962's runner-up Jim Clark managed this with ease in his Lotus-Climax. He posted the fastest practice time and started the race on pole position. Reigning champion Graham Hill started second in his BRM, with John Surtees (Ferrari) and Richie Ginther (BRM) in third and fourth. Hill and Ginther took the lead at the start, but the first nine cars kept going nose-to-tail. Clark managed to get past Hill on lap 7, but then went wide at the Station hairpin and went down to third once again. He tried again and the lead changed hands multiple times, before Clark went ahead definitively and increased his lead to 17 seconds at three-quarters race-distance. Then suddenly, his gearbox jammed and his wheels locked. Hill was gifted the win, ahead of teammate Ginther and Bruce McLaren in the Cooper.

The Belgian Grand Prix was run at Spa-Francorchamps, one of the fastest circuits of the year, with the 1.5 litre cars running full throttle for some three minutes per lap. Clark was still suffering from gearbox issues, so Hill took pole position, ahead of Dan Gurney (Brabham) and local hero Willy Mairesse (Ferrari). Clark started eighth, but somehow, managed to take the lead before the first corner was reached. Hill followed him and the pair had a 15-second lead after the first lap. The race was run in very wet conditions and Clark had the upper-hand, stretching out a lead of his own to almost 30 seconds at half-distance. Then when Hill's gearbox broke, his win looked sealed, expect the heaviest storm of the day flooded the track. Five drivers crashed and it was discussed to stop the race, but Clark cautiously completed the laps, ahead of McLaren and Gurney.

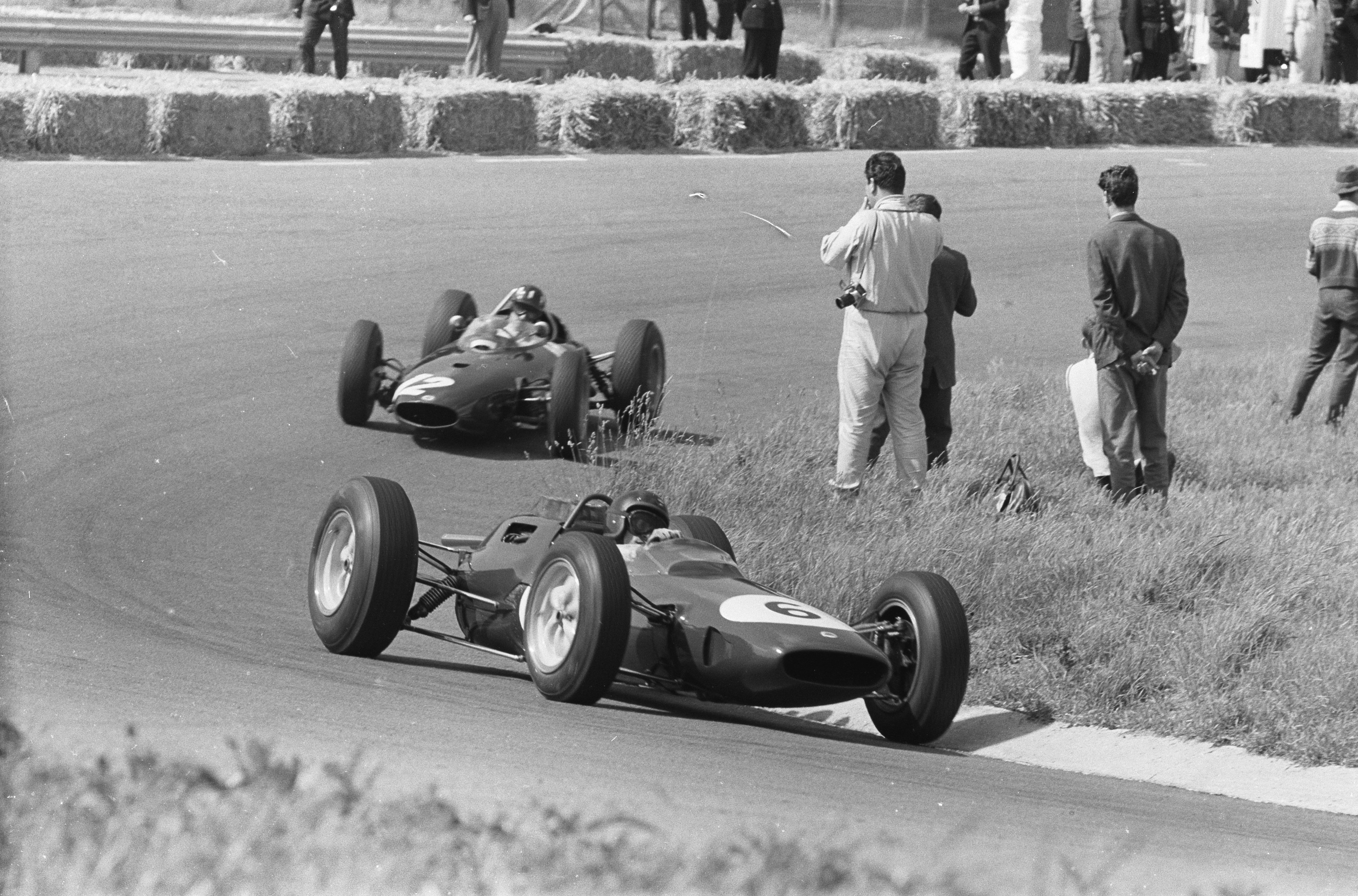
Jim Clark on his way to win the Dutch Grand Prix

Moving north some 300 km (190 mi), Circuit Zandvoort hosted the Dutch Grand Prix. Clark started on pole, ahead of Hill and McLaren. The three arrived side-by-side at Tarzan corner, but the positions were unchanged. Brabham had started fourth but got up to second while his teammate Gurney drew everyone's attention with a heroic recovery drive after a bad start. Hill got back up to second, but his BRM was overheating. Gurney had climbed to fourth, but a strut underneath the car had come loose and a pit stop brought him back down the order. Hill's engine had enough on lap 58 and he was forced to pit, letting Surtees into second and Gurney up to third. The latter had been working wonders again, but Clark, meanwhile, was a lap ahead of everyone else. He won the race to make it a "grand slam", ahead of Gurney and Surtees, a late spin by the Ferrari driver gave Gurney a deserved place as 'best-of-the-rest'.

In the Drivers' Championship, Jim Clark (Lotus) was leading with 18 points, ahead of Richie Ginther (BRM) with 11 and Bruce McLaren (Cooper) and Dan Gurney (Brabham), both with 10. Lotus was leading the Manufacturers' Championship with 19 points, ahead of BRM with 14 and Cooper and Brabham with 10.

=== Rounds 4 to 7 ===
Championship leader Jim Clark scored another pole position at the French Grand Prix, ahead of Graham Hill and Dan Gurney. At the start, Hill stalled his engine, along with Masten Gregory and the unrelated Phil Hill, but they were allowed to be push-started without further consequence, which was a diversion from the normal rules by the French race director. Behind Clark, a group of Brabhams and BRMs were fighting over second place. A couple of laps later, a series of retirements had changed the picture, and Clark's engine was not reaching full rpm either. Jack Brabham was catching the leading Lotus, but when the rain fell, Clark was again the fastest man on track and took the chequered flag to complete another "grand slam" and a hattrick of wins. When an electrical wire had come loose, Brabham's engine died. Although he could restart it, second place was now up for grabs. Hill took first advantage but his clutch slipped and it was Tony Maggs for Cooper that was the first to finish behind the almighty Clark. During the race, the stewards decided to penalise the three drivers that stalled on the grid by adding a minute to their race time. Hill was still classified as third, but at a later point, it was decided to withhold his championship points. No points were awarded for third place.

For the British Grand Prix at Silverstone, Clark scored a fourth consecutive pole position, ahead of Gurney and Hill. Clark bogged down at the start, but he was back in front after just four laps. Brabham was the first of a group tightly fighting over second place. Gurney took over when Brabham's engine blew up. The race went on without incidents until Gurney's engine blew up on lap 60 and spread oil across the track. Hill went into second place before he starting running out of fuel, letting Surtees into second and coasting over the line in third place. Clark scored his fourth win in a row.

Clark looked unstoppable going into the German Grand Prix, putting his Lotus on pole once again, ahead of Surtees and Bandini (BRM). Clark held the lead at the start and was expected to run away with it, but sixth-starting Richie Ginther overtook him and so did Surtees, later in the first lap. Surtees and Clark soon passed Ginther, but still, it was a Ferrari in front and not a Lotus. And that remained for a while, with Clark going faster through the corners, but his Climax engine cutting out a cylinder, slowing him down on the straights. Graham Hill retired with a failing gearbox. When Surtees set a new lap record, Clark eased off to at least ensure a second place. Surtees delivered Ferrari's first win in two years. Ginther finished third. There were multiple heavy crashes during the race: Surtees's teammate Willy Mairesse came off worst with a broken arm.

Clark was now 20 points ahead in the championship, and he would clinch the title if he won the Italian Grand Prix, no matter the results of his rivals. Unlike in 1962, the organisers had planned to use the full 10 km (6.2 mi) Monza circuit, including the oval. Bob Anderson crashed his Lola in practice and described it the safest accident he could wish to have. However, the police went round the track and noted that there were no fences on the inside of the oval to protect spectators. The organisers quickly agreed, seeing that there was a petition going to refuse the race unless the banking was eliminated, and declared to use the road circuit only for the rest of the weekend. Surtees qualified on pole in front of Ferrari's home crowd, ahead of Hill and Clark. Hill got the best start and was followed by Clark, before the traditional slipstreaming commenced and the lead changes hands multiple times through the next laps. Soon, though, Surtees and Clark were on their own, and then the Ferrari engine blew up. This gifted Clark the lead, but without a slipstream, the Climax engine was not up for it, so Hill and Gurney caught him and they formed a new trio at the front. But Hill's clutch gave out just after half-distance and Gurney's BRM had trouble with its fuel system, so Clark was left alone once more and his pace dropped. By this point, however, he was a lap ahead of second-placed Ginther and he cruised to the finish, to take the win and claim the 1963 championship.

Jim Clark (Lotus) led the championship with 51 points, ahead of Richie Ginther (BRM, 24) and John Surtees (Ferrari, 22). On the basis of points, Ginther could still get level with Clark, but only the six best results in the season would count towards the championship, so on the minute chance that he would win the last three races with Clark out of the points in all 3, his 2 4th-place finishes and lone 5th-place finish would be discounted, which would leave Ginther on 43, still 8 short of Clark. It marked Clark's and Lotus's first titles, and it was the first time that a driver secured the title with three races to go. In the Manufacturers' Championship, Lotus stood on 51 points, ahead of BRM (28) and Ferrari (22).

=== Rounds 8 to 10 ===
Even with the title in the pocket, Jim Clark was not easing off and fought for pole position for the United States Grand Prix, but it was 1962 champion Graham Hill that snatched it by a tenth of a second. His rivals in the hunt for second position in the championship, John Surtees and Richie Ginther, started on the second row. At the start, Clark's engine stalled, so Hill was unchallenged into the first corner. The Lotus was pushed to life and the freshly crowned champion started his race over a lap down. On lap 7, Surtees took the lead from Hill and Dan Gurney took third place from Ginther. Hill followed the Ferrari but had had enough of it by lap 30. He tried to overtake twice, but both times, Surtees repassed him on the straight. By lap 80, Hill was falling back with handling problems, but Surtees came into the pits with a failing engine. The BRMs of Hill and Ginther finished 1–2, ahead of Clark in third, whose engine was misfiring but had seen more than ten other drivers retiring.

Clark was back on top for the Mexican Grand Prix, he started ahead of Surtees and Hill. Ginther, second in the championship standings, started fifth. At the start, Hill missed a gear and moved down to eighth. Fourth-starting Gurney moved up to second. Surtees pitted on lap 19 and was disqualified for needing a push-start from his mechanics. Double World Champion Jack Brabham inherited third place and managed to get past Ginther. Clark finished a lonely race at the top, almost a lap ahead of Brabham and Ginther. Hill finished fourth.

Going into the final race, the South African Grand Prix, Ginther (29 points), Hill (25) and Surtees (22) could all still finish runner-up in the championship. The deal would be done if one of them could beat Clark to victory, but the champion started on pole position. Surtees started fourth, was up to second at the end of the first lap, but was back to fourth on lap 5. He suddenly retired on lap 43 when his engine blew up. Brabham had started second but fell back with a loss of power, while teammate Gurney was running a comfortable second, actually keeping up with Clark but not able to do more than that. Ginther's driveshaft failed on lap 44, letting Hill into third place and gifting the Brit second place in the championship.

The Drivers' Championship ended with Jim Clark (Lotus) on 54 points, winning his first title, ahead of BRM teammates Graham Hill and Richie Ginther, both scoring 29 points, but the Brit getting second place on countback. In the Manufacturers' Championship, Lotus gathered 54 points, winning their first title as well, ahead of BRM with 36 and Brabham with 28.

== Results and standings ==
=== Grands Prix ===
Round	Grand Prix	Pole position	Fastest lap	Winning driver	Winning constructor	Tyre	Report
1	Monaco Grand Prix	(United Kingdom) Jim Clark	(United Kingdom) John Surtees	(United Kingdom) Graham Hill	(United Kingdom) BRM	D	Report
2	(Belgium) Belgian Grand Prix	(United Kingdom) Graham Hill	(United Kingdom) Jim Clark	(United Kingdom) Jim Clark	(United Kingdom) Lotus-Climax	D	Report
3	(Netherlands) Dutch Grand Prix	(United Kingdom) Jim Clark	(United Kingdom) Jim Clark	(United Kingdom) Jim Clark	(United Kingdom) Lotus-Climax	D	Report
4	(France) French Grand Prix	(United Kingdom) Jim Clark	(United Kingdom) Jim Clark	(United Kingdom) Jim Clark	(United Kingdom) Lotus-Climax	D	Report
5	(United Kingdom) British Grand Prix	(United Kingdom) Jim Clark	(United Kingdom) John Surtees	(United Kingdom) Jim Clark	(United Kingdom) Lotus-Climax	D	Report
6	(West Germany) German Grand Prix	(United Kingdom) Jim Clark	(United Kingdom) John Surtees	(United Kingdom) John Surtees	(Italy) Ferrari	D	Report
7	(Italy) Italian Grand Prix	(United Kingdom) John Surtees	(United Kingdom) Jim Clark	(United Kingdom) Jim Clark	(United Kingdom) Lotus-Climax	D	Report
8	United States Grand Prix	(United Kingdom) Graham Hill	(United Kingdom) Jim Clark	(United Kingdom) Graham Hill	(United Kingdom) BRM	D	Report
9	(Mexico) Mexican Grand Prix	(United Kingdom) Jim Clark	(United Kingdom) Jim Clark	(United Kingdom) Jim Clark	(United Kingdom) Lotus-Climax	D	Report
10	(South Africa) South African Grand Prix	(United Kingdom) Jim Clark	(United States) Dan Gurney	(United Kingdom) Jim Clark	(United Kingdom) Lotus-Climax	D	Report

=== Scoring system ===
Points were awarded to the top six classified finishers. Only the best six results counted towards the championship.

The International Cup for F1 Manufacturers only counted the points of the highest-finishing driver for each race. Additionally, like the Drivers' Championship, only the best six results counted towards the cup.

Numbers without parentheses are championship points; numbers in parentheses are total points scored. Points were awarded in the following system:

Position	1st	2nd	3rd	4th	5th	6th
Race	9	6	4	3	2	1

=== World Drivers' Championship standings ===
Pos.	Driver	MON (Monaco)	BEL (Belgium)	NED (Netherlands)	FRA (France)	GBR (United Kingdom)	GER (West Germany)	ITA (Italy)	USA (United States)	MEX (Mexico)	RSA (South Africa)	Pts.
1	(United Kingdom) Jim Clark	8^{P}	1^{F}	1^{P}^{F}	1^{P}^{F}	1^{P}	(2^{P})	1^{F}	(3^{F})	1^{P}^{F}	(1^{P})	54 (73)
2	(United Kingdom) Graham Hill	1	Ret^{P}	Ret	3‡	3	Ret	16	1^{P}	4	3	29
3	(United States) Richie Ginther	2	4	(5)	Ret	(4)	3	2	2	3	Ret	29 (34)
4	(United Kingdom) John Surtees	4^{F}	Ret	3	Ret	2^{F}	1^{F}	Ret^{P}	9	DSQ	Ret	22
5	(United States) Dan Gurney	Ret	3	2	5	Ret	Ret	14	Ret	6	2^{F}	19
6	(New Zealand) Bruce McLaren	3	2	Ret	12	Ret	Ret	3	11	Ret	4	17
7	(Australia) Jack Brabham	9	Ret	Ret	4	Ret	7	5	4	2	13	14
8	(South Africa) Tony Maggs	5	7	Ret	2	9	Ret	6	Ret	Ret	7	9
9	(United Kingdom) Innes Ireland	Ret	Ret	4	9	Ret	Ret	4				6
10	(Italy) Lorenzo Bandini				10	5	Ret	Ret	5	Ret	5	6
11	(Sweden) Jo Bonnier	7	5	11	NC	Ret	6	7	8	5	6	6
12	(West Germany) Gerhard Mitter			Ret			4					3
13	(United States) Jim Hall	Ret	Ret	8	11	6	5	8	10	8		3
14	(Netherlands) Carel Godin de Beaufort		6	9		10	Ret	DNQ	6	10	10	2
15	(Switzerland) Jo Siffert	Ret	Ret	7	6	Ret	9	Ret	Ret	9		1
16	(United Kingdom) Trevor Taylor	6	Ret	10	13	Ret	8		Ret	Ret	8	1
17	(Italy) Ludovico Scarfiotti			6	DNS							1
—	(New Zealand) Chris Amon	DNS	Ret	Ret	7	7	Ret	DNS		Ret		0
—	(United States) Hap Sharp								Ret	7		0
—	(Canada) Peter Broeker								7			0
—	(France) Maurice Trintignant	Ret			8			9				0
—	(United Kingdom) Mike Hailwood					8		10				0
—	(United States) Tony Settember		8		Ret	Ret	Ret	DNQ				0
—	(Federation of Rhodesia and Nyasaland) John Love										9	0
—	(France) Bernard Collomb	DNQ					10					0
—	(United States) Phil Hill		Ret	Ret	NC			11	Ret	Ret		0
—	(United States) Masten Gregory				Ret	11		Ret	Ret	Ret		0
—	(Mexico) Moisés Solana									11		0
—	(South Africa) Doug Serrurier										11	0
—	(United Kingdom) Bob Anderson					12		12				0
—	(South Africa) Trevor Blokdyk										12	0
—	(United Kingdom) John Campbell-Jones					13						0
—	(United Kingdom) Mike Spence							13				0
—	(South Africa) Brausch Niemann										14	0
—	(Italy) Giancarlo Baghetti		Ret	Ret				15	Ret	Ret		0
—	(Belgium) Willy Mairesse	Ret	Ret				Ret					0
—	(United Kingdom) Ian Burgess					Ret	Ret					0
—	(Mexico) Pedro Rodriguez								Ret	Ret		0
—	(United Kingdom) Ian Raby					Ret	DNQ	DNQ				0
—	(Belgium) Lucien Bianchi		Ret									0
—	(Portugal) Mário de Araújo Cabral						Ret	DNS				0
—	(United States) Rodger Ward								Ret			0
—	(South Africa) Peter de Klerk										Ret	0
—	(Federation of Rhodesia and Nyasaland) Sam Tingle										Ret	0
—	(South Africa) Ernie Pieterse										Ret	0
—	(United Kingdom) David Prophet										Ret	0
—	(Belgium) André Pilette						DNQ	DNQ				0
—	(United Kingdom) Tim Parnell						DNQ					0
—	(West Germany) Kurt Kuhnke						DNQ					0
—	(Italy) Roberto Lippi							DNQ				0
—	(Italy) Ernesto Brambilla							DNQ				0
—	(United States) Frank Dochnal									DNQ		0
—	(United Kingdom) Peter Arundell				DNS							0
—	(South Africa) Paddy Driver										DNS	0
Pos.	Driver	MON (Monaco)	BEL (Belgium)	NED (Netherlands)	FRA (France)	GBR (United Kingdom)	GER (West Germany)	ITA (Italy)	USA (United States)	MEX (Mexico)	RSA (South Africa)	Pts.

Key
Colour	Result
Gold	Winner
Silver	Second place
Bronze	Third place
Green	Other points position
Blue	Other classified position
Blue	Not classified, finished (NC)
Purple	Not classified, retired (Ret)
Red	Did not qualify (DNQ)
Black	Disqualified (DSQ)
White	Did not start (DNS)
White	Race cancelled (C)
Blank	Did not practice (DNP)
Blank	Excluded (EX)
Blank	Did not arrive (DNA)
Blank	Withdrawn (WD)
Blank	Did not enter (empty cell)
Annotation	Meaning
P	Pole position
F	Fastest lap

- Italics indicate fastest lap
- **Bold** indicates pole position

‡ No points awarded as Hill's car was pushed at the start line.

=== International Cup for F1 Manufacturers standings ===
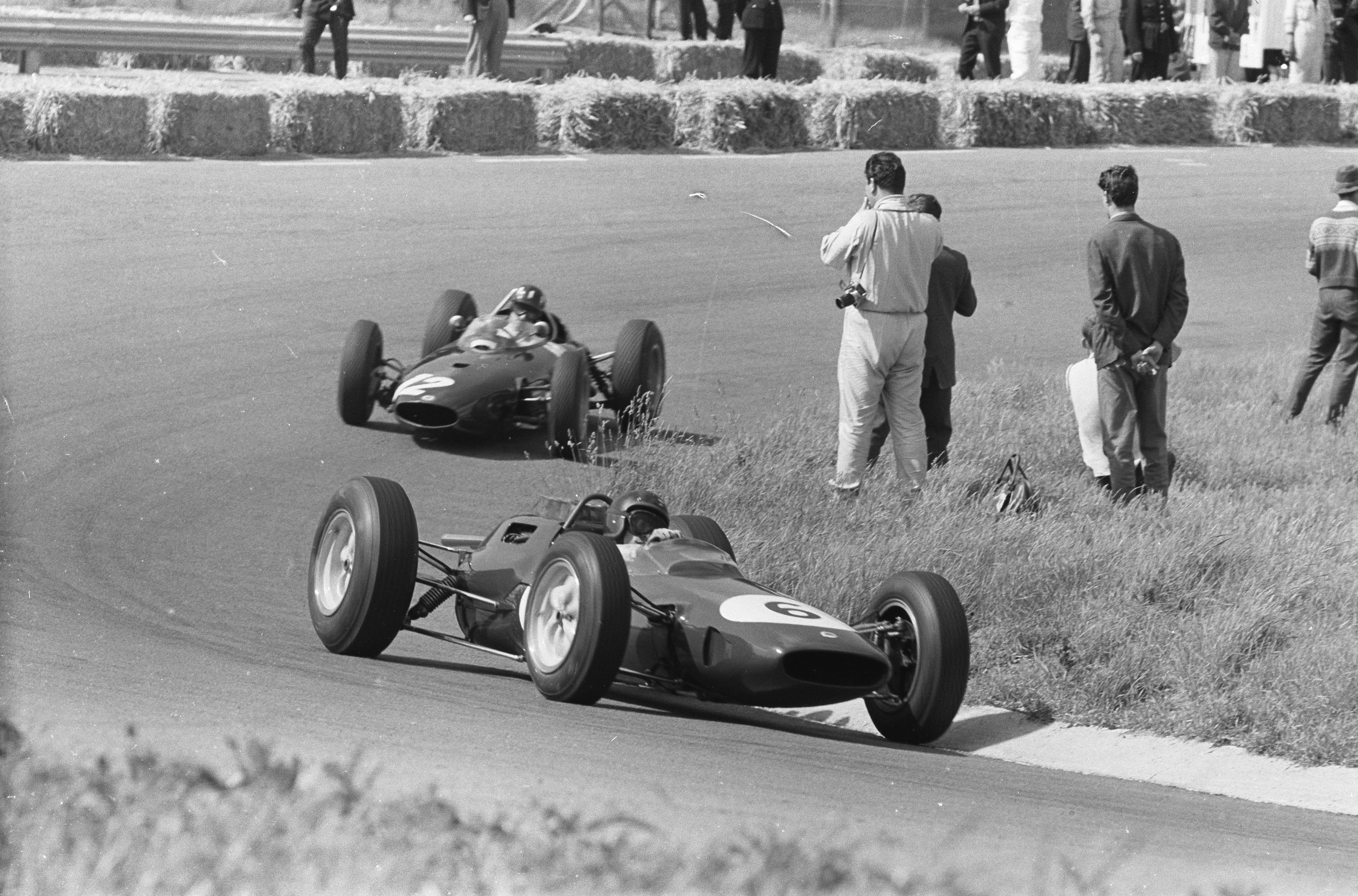
Lotus-Climax won the International Cup for F1 Manufacturers with the Lotus 25

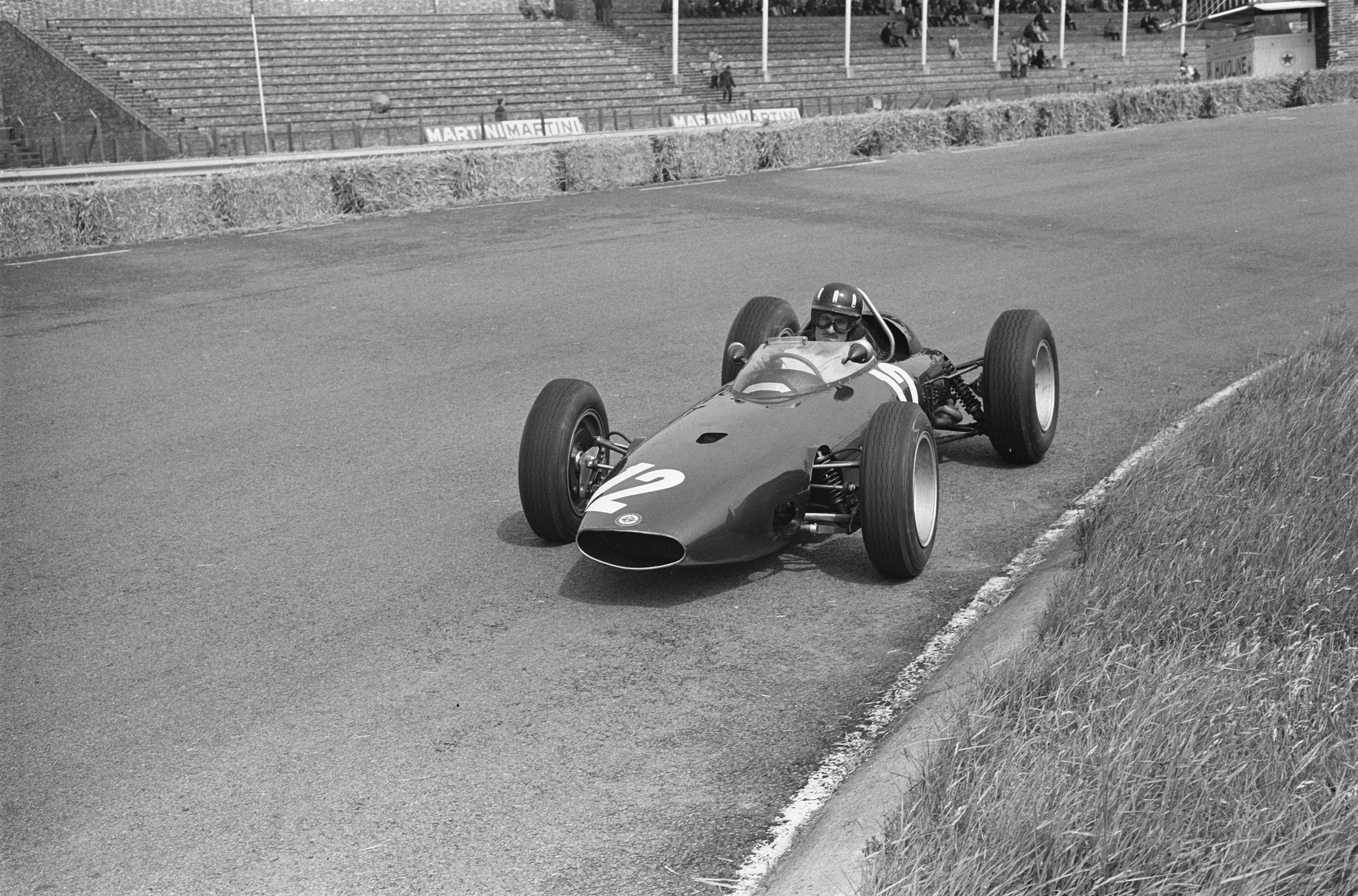
BRM placed second

Pos.	Manufacturer	MON (Monaco)	BEL (Belgium)	NED (Netherlands)	FRA (France)	GBR (United Kingdom)	GER (West Germany)	ITA (Italy)	USA (United States)	MEX (Mexico)	RSA (South Africa)	Pts.
1	(United Kingdom) Lotus-Climax	(6)	**1**	**1**	**1**	**1**	(2)	**1**	(3)	**1**	(1)	54 (74)
2	(United Kingdom) BRM	**1**	(4)	(5)	3‡	**3**	**3**	**2**	**1**	**3**	(3)	36 (45)
3	(United Kingdom) Brabham-Climax	Ret	**3**	**2**	**4**	Ret	7	(5)	**4**	**2**	**2**	28 (30)
4	(Italy) Ferrari	**4**	Ret	**3**	Ret	**2**	**1**	Ret	**5**	Ret	**5**	26
5	(United Kingdom) Cooper-Climax	**3**	**2**	11	**2**	9	(6)	**3**	8	**5**	**4**	25 (26)
6	(United Kingdom) BRP-BRM		Ret	**4**	9	Ret		**4**	WD	WD		6
7	(West Germany) Porsche		**6**	9		10	**4**	DNQ	**6**	10	10	5
8	(United Kingdom) Lotus-BRM	Ret	Ret	7	**6**	**6**	**5**	8	10	7	DNS	4
—	(United Kingdom) Lola-Climax	Ret	Ret	Ret	7	7	Ret	10	Ret	Ret	WD	0
—	(Canada) Stebro-Ford								7			0
—	(United Kingdom) Scirocco-BRM	WD	8	WD	Ret	Ret	Ret	DNQ				0
—	(Italy) ATS	WD	Ret	Ret	WD	WD	WD	11	Ret	Ret		0
—	(South Africa) LDS-Alfa Romeo										11	0
—	(United Kingdom) Cooper-Maserati							DNQ			12	0
—	(United Kingdom) Lotus-Ford										14	0
—	(United Kingdom) Gilby-BRM					Ret	DNQ	DNQ				0
—	(South Africa) Alfa Special-Alfa Romeo										Ret	0
—	(United Kingdom) Lotus-Borgward						DNQ					0
—	(Italy) De Tomaso-Ferrari	WD			WD	DNP		DNQ				0
Pos.	Manufacturer	MON (Monaco)	BEL (Belgium)	NED (Netherlands)	FRA (France)	GBR (United Kingdom)	GER (West Germany)	ITA (Italy)	USA (United States)	MEX (Mexico)	RSA (South Africa)	Pts.

- **Bold** results counted to championship totals.

‡ No points awarded as Hill's car was pushed at the start line.

== Non-championship races ==
Other Formula One races, which did not count towards the World Championship, were also held in 1963.

Race name	Circuit	Date	Winning driver	Constructor	Report
(United Kingdom) IV Lombank Trophy	Snetterton	30 March	(United Kingdom) Graham Hill	(United Kingdom) BRM	Report
(France) XXIII Pau Grand Prix	Pau	15 April	(United Kingdom) Jim Clark	(United Kingdom) Lotus-Climax	Report
(United Kingdom) XI Glover Trophy	Goodwood	15 April	(United Kingdom) Innes Ireland	(United Kingdom) Lotus-BRM	Report
(Italy) IV Gran Premio Citta di Imola	Imola	21 April	(United Kingdom) Jim Clark	(United Kingdom) Lotus-Climax	Report
(Italy) XIV Gran Premio di Siracusa	Syracuse	25 April	(Switzerland) Jo Siffert	(United Kingdom) Lotus-BRM	Report
(United Kingdom) XIX BARC Aintree 200	Aintree	27 April	(United Kingdom) Graham Hill	(United Kingdom) BRM	Report
(United Kingdom) XVI BRDC International Trophy	Silverstone	11 May	(United Kingdom) Jim Clark	(United Kingdom) Lotus-Climax	Report
(Italy) XV Gran Premio di Roma	Vallelunga	19 May	(United Kingdom) Bob Anderson	(United Kingdom) Lola-Climax	Report
(West Germany) III Solituderennen	Solitudering	28 July	(Australia) Jack Brabham	(United Kingdom) Brabham-Climax	Report
(Sweden) XII Kanonloppet	Karlskoga	11 August	(United Kingdom) Jim Clark	(United Kingdom) Lotus-Climax	Report
(Italy) III Mediterranean Grand Prix	Enna Pergusa	18 August	(United Kingdom) John Surtees	(Italy) Ferrari	Report
(Austria) I Austrian Grand Prix	Zeltweg	1 September	(Australia) Jack Brabham	(United Kingdom) Brabham-Climax	Report
(United Kingdom) X International Gold Cup	Oulton Park	21 September	(United Kingdom) Jim Clark	(United Kingdom) Lotus-Climax	Report
(South Africa) Rand Grand Prix	Kyalami	14 December	(United Kingdom) John Surtees	(Italy) Ferrari	Report
