= 1963 United States Grand Prix =

Race details
- Date: October 6, 1963
- Official name: VI Grand Prix of the United States
- Location: Watkins Glen Grand Prix Race Course; Watkins Glen, New York
- Course: Permanent road course
- Course length: 3.701 km (2.30 miles)
- Distance: 110 laps, 407.11 km (252.97 miles)
- Weather: Sunny

Pole position
Driver	(United Kingdom) Graham Hill	BRM
- Time: 1:13.4

Fastest lap
Driver	(United Kingdom) Jim Clark	Lotus-Climax
- Time: 1:14.5 on lap 50

Podium
First	(United Kingdom) Graham Hill	BRM
Second	(United States) Richie Ginther	BRM
Third	(United Kingdom) Jim Clark	Lotus-Climax

The 1963 United States Grand Prix was a Formula One motor race held on October 6, 1963, at the Watkins Glen Grand Prix Race Course in Watkins Glen, New York. It was race 8 of 10 in both the 1963 World Championship of Drivers and the 1963 International Cup for Formula One Manufacturers. The 110-lap race was won by BRM driver Graham Hill after he started from pole position. His teammate Richie Ginther finished second and Lotus driver Jim Clark came in third.

== Summary ==
By the time the teams – including Ferrari for the first time at Watkins Glen – came to America, Jim Clark had wrapped up the Driver's Championship with five wins in seven races. At The Glen, however, the day belonged to Graham Hill and BRM, as Hill started from the pole and won by more than half a minute over American teammate Richie Ginther. Hill owed much of his success to Clark's dead battery on the dummy grid (used for the first time in F1), and the failure of John Surtees's Ferrari engine while leading with 30 laps to go.

In the first hour of qualifying on Friday, Clark's Lotus equalled his lap record of 1:15.0 from the previous year. Hill and Surtees were right on the Scot's pace, as well, and all three were soon under 1:14. At one point, Hill's BRM jumped out of gear on the back straight and left the track, skipping through the woods without hitting any trees, but at the end of the session, he was fastest at 1:13.4. Jack Brabham was glad just to be at the circuit, after he was unable to find a rental car or a taxi at the airport in Elmira, twenty miles (32 km) away, and ended up hitchhiking to the track with his baggage and racing gear!

On Saturday, Canadian Peter Broeker's Stebro (running a four-cylinder Ford with 110 horsepower (82 kW) compared to almost 200 for the Climax and BRM V8's) dumped oil all around the circuit. The session was stopped for 30 minutes to clean up, but conditions were never again good enough for anyone to better their Friday times, so the top six were Graham Hill, Clark, Surtees, Ginther, and the Brabhams of Sir Jack and Dan Gurney. In addition to Ginther and Gurney, the grid contained five other Americans – Masten Gregory, Phil Hill, Jim Hall, Hap Sharp and Rodger Ward – the most ever in a Formula One field, as well as Mexican Pedro Rodríguez, who was making his Formula One debut.

Race day was bright and clear with a record crowd of nearly 60,000. A dummy grid was used for the first time in a Championship Grand Prix, and when the field moved forward to the starting grid, Clark's Lotus remained still. At the flag, Hill led Ginther, Surtees, Gurney, Tony Maggs, Gregory and Brabham up the hill and through the Esses. The Lotus crew discovered that Clark's battery was dead, and by the time they replaced it, Broeker's Stebro, trailing the field, was already into his second lap.

Surtees made the first move, getting by Ginther to split the BRM's, and then, on lap seven, taking the lead from Hill. Gurney followed him and took second briefly, before surrendering the spot back to Hill. By lap 15, Clark was up into 14th place with his engine still not sounding entirely right.

Hill began pushing Surtees on lap 30. He got by to take the lead after shadowing for two laps, gave it back, took it again two laps later, and finally surrendered it again, settling into the Ferrari's slipstream. On lap 43, Gurney suddenly slowed and then retired from third place with fuel starvation and a chassis failure, moving Clark up to seventh.

After trailing Surtees closely for some time, Hill lost his tow when his anti-roll bar came loose and the BRM's handling changed abruptly. Fighting severe understeer, he began throwing the car into turns to slide the rear end around, flinging stones off the curbs and losing ground to the leading Ferrari. On lap 82, with no threat to his lead, Surtees's engine lost power, and he cruised into the pits to retire. "I was just hanging on to him," Hill said afterward. "He's a very tricky driver. He was gaining a half-second each lap on me until he went out. I think it was a good measure of the difference in our two cars." Suddenly in the lead again, with only Ginther on the same lap, Hill backed off and set his sights on bringing the car home.

The Englishman drove under the flag 34 seconds ahead of teammate Ginther, repeating BRM's season-opening sweep at Monaco. New World Champion Clark took the final podium spot when he overtook Brabham, whose engine had been misfiring for much of the race. It was Hill's first American win, but one that he would repeat in 1964 and 1965.

== Classification ==
=== Qualifying ===
Pos	No	Driver	Constructor	Qualifying times		Gap
Pos	No	Driver	Constructor	Q1	Q2	Gap
1	1	(United Kingdom) Graham Hill	BRM	1:13.4	1:14.0	—
2	8	(United Kingdom) Jim Clark	Lotus-Climax	1:13.5	1:13.9	+0.1
3	23	(United Kingdom) John Surtees	Ferrari	(1:13.6)	1:13.7	+0.3
4	2	(United States) Richie Ginther	BRM	1:14.0	1:14.2	+0.6
5	5	(Australia) Jack Brabham	Brabham-Climax	1:14.3	1:14.2	+0.8
6	6	(United States) Dan Gurney	Brabham-Climax	1:15.5	1:14.5	+1.1
7	9	(United Kingdom) Trevor Taylor	Lotus-Climax	1:15.6	1:16.1	+2.2
8	17	(United States) Masten Gregory	Lola-Climax	1:15.6	1:19.0	+2.2
9	24	(Italy) Lorenzo Bandini	Ferrari	1:15.8	1:16.3	+2.4
10	4	(South Africa) Tony Maggs	Cooper-Climax	1:16.4	1:15.8	+2.4
11	3	(New Zealand) Bruce McLaren	Cooper-Climax	1:15.9	1:17.1	+2.5
12	11	(Sweden) Jo Bonnier	Cooper-Climax	1:16.4	1:16.3	+2.9
13	10	(Mexico) Pedro Rodríguez	Lotus-Climax	1:17.5	1:16.5	+3.1
14	14	(Switzerland) Jo Siffert	Lotus-BRM	1:18.4	1:16.5	+3.1
15	25	(United States) Phil Hill	ATS	1:17.1	1:19.6	+3.7
16	16	(United States) Jim Hall	Lotus-BRM	1:18.5	1:17.7	+4.3
17	18	(United States) Rodger Ward	Lotus-BRM	1:19.2	No time	+5.8
18	22	(United States) Hap Sharp	Lotus-BRM	1:28.5	1:20.0	+6.6
19	12	(Netherlands) Carel Godin de Beaufort	Porsche	1:46.8	1:22.3	+8.9
20	26	(Italy) Giancarlo Baghetti	ATS	1:25.2	1:28.7	+11.8
21	21	(Canada) Peter Broeker	Stebro-Ford	1:28.6	1:28.9	+15.2

=== Race ===
Pos	No	Driver	Constructor	Laps	Time/Retired	Grid	Points
1	1	(United Kingdom) Graham Hill	BRM	110	2:19:22.1	1	9
2	2	(United States) Richie Ginther	BRM	110	+ 34.3	4	6
3	8	(United Kingdom) Jim Clark	Lotus-Climax	109	+ 1 lap	2	4
4	5	(Australia) Jack Brabham	Brabham-Climax	108	+ 2 laps	5	3
5	24	(Italy) Lorenzo Bandini	Ferrari	106	+ 4 laps	9	2
6	12	(Netherlands) Carel Godin de Beaufort	Porsche	99	+ 11 laps	19	1
7	21	(Canada) Peter Broeker	Stebro-Ford	88	+ 22 laps	21	
8	11	(Sweden) Jo Bonnier	Cooper-Climax	85	+ 25 laps	12	
9	23	(United Kingdom) John Surtees	Ferrari	82	Engine	3	
10	16	(United States) Jim Hall	Lotus-BRM	76	Gearbox	16	
11	3	(New Zealand) Bruce McLaren	Cooper-Climax	74	Fuel pump	11	
Ret	14	(Switzerland) Jo Siffert	Lotus-BRM	56	Gearbox	14	
Ret	4	(South Africa) Tony Maggs	Cooper-Climax	44	Ignition	10	
Ret	18	(United States) Rodger Ward	Lotus-BRM	44	Gearbox	17	
Ret	6	(United States) Dan Gurney	Brabham-Climax	42	Chassis	6	
Ret	10	(Mexico) Pedro Rodríguez	Lotus-Climax	36	Engine	13	
Ret	9	(United Kingdom) Trevor Taylor	Lotus-Climax	24	Electrical	7	
Ret	17	(United States) Masten Gregory	Lola-Climax	14	Engine	8	
Ret	22	(United States) Hap Sharp	Lotus-BRM	6	Retirement	18	
Ret	25	(United States) Phil Hill	ATS	4	Oil pump	15	
Ret	26	(Italy) Giancarlo Baghetti	ATS	0	Oil Pump	20	
WD	7	(United States) Walt Hansgen	Lotus-Climax				
WD	15	(United Kingdom) Innes Ireland	Lotus-BRM		Driver injured		
WD	19	(Canada) Ernie de Vos	Stebro-Ford		No car		

== Notes ==
- This was the Formula One World Championship debut for Mexican driver and future Grand Prix winner Pedro Rodríguez and for Canadian driver Peter Broeker.
- It was also the debut for Stebro as the first Canadian constructor and for Ford as an engine supplier.
- For the 52nd consecutive time and since the 1958 Argentine Grand Prix had a Coventry Climax-powered car finished in the Top-10. It therefore broke the record previously set at the 1957 German Grand Prix by Ferrari of 51 consecutive races finishing in the Top-10.

== Championship standings after the race ==
- **Bold text** indicates the World Champions.

Drivers' Championship standings

	Pos	Driver	Points
	1	(United Kingdom) **Jim Clark**	51 (55)
	2	(United States) Richie Ginther	28 (30)
2	3	(United Kingdom) Graham Hill	22
1	4	(United Kingdom) John Surtees	22
1	5	(New Zealand) Bruce McLaren	14

Constructors' Championship standings

Pos	Constructor	Points
1	(United Kingdom) Lotus-Climax	51 (56)
2	(United Kingdom) BRM	35 (37)
3	(Italy) Ferrari	24
4	(United Kingdom) Cooper-Climax	21
5	(United Kingdom) Brabham-Climax	18

- Notes: Only the top five positions are included for both sets of standings. Only the best 6 results counted towards the Championship. Numbers without parentheses are Championship points; numbers in parentheses are total points scored.

Previous race: 1963 Italian Grand Prix	FIA Formula One World Championship; 1963 season	Next race: 1963 Mexican Grand Prix
Previous race: 1962 United States Grand Prix	United States Grand Prix	Next race: 1964 United States Grand Prix
