= 1963 Mexican Grand Prix =

Race details
- Date: 27 October 1963
- Official name: II Gran Premio de Mexico
- Location: Magdalena Mixhuca, Mexico City
- Course: Permanent racing facility
- Course length: 5.000 km (3.107 miles)
- Distance: 65 laps, 325.000 km (201.946 miles)
- Weather: Overcast, dry

Pole position
Driver	(United Kingdom) Jim Clark	Lotus-Climax
- Time: 1:58.8

Fastest lap
Driver	(United Kingdom) Jim Clark	Lotus-Climax
- Time: 1:58.1

Podium
First	(United Kingdom) Jim Clark	Lotus-Climax
Second	(Australia) Jack Brabham	Brabham-Climax
Third	(United States) Richie Ginther	BRM

The 1963 Mexican Grand Prix was a Formula One motor race held at the Ciudad Deportiva Magdalena Mixhuca in Mexico City on 27 October 1963. It was race 9 of 10 in both the 1963 World Championship of Drivers and the 1963 International Cup for Formula One Manufacturers.

Jim Clark dominated the race from pole position, a time that was 1.7 seconds faster than anybody else. Mexico was considered one of his most successful venues. His fastest lap of the race eclipsed his pole time by 0.7 seconds, and he lapped the entire field except for second and third behind him. He eventually scored a total of five pole positions, four fastest laps and three victories at the venue in his Formula One career. This was also his sixth win, his sixth fastest lap, and his sixth pole position of the nine races completed in 1963.

This was also the only World Championship Grand Prix where a car raced with the number 13 until Pastor Maldonado selected the number as his permanent race number in 2014.

== Classification ==
=== Qualifying ===
Pos	No	Driver	Constructor	Qualifying times		Gap
Pos	No	Driver	Constructor	Q1	Q2	Gap
1	8	(United Kingdom) Jim Clark	Lotus-Climax	1:58.8	2:07.3	—
2	23	(United Kingdom) John Surtees	Ferrari	2:00.5	2:05.4	+1.7
3	1	(United Kingdom) Graham Hill	BRM	2:00.6	2:05.7	+1.8
4	6	(United States) Dan Gurney	Brabham-Climax	2:01.6	2:07.6	+2.8
5	2	(United States) Richie Ginther	BRM	2:01.8	2:14.4	+3.0
6	3	(New Zealand) Bruce McLaren	Cooper-Climax	2:02.3	2:08.7	+3.5
7	24	(Italy) Lorenzo Bandini	Ferrari	2:02.4	2:11.3	+3.6
8	11	(Sweden) Jo Bonnier	Cooper-Climax	2:02.6	2:10.5	+3.8
9	14	(Switzerland) Jo Siffert	Lotus-BRM	2:03.3	2:29.4	+4.5
10	5	(Australia) Jack Brabham	Brabham-Climax	2:04.3	2:03.6	+4.8
11	13	(Mexico) Moisés Solana	BRM	2:04.1	2:20.6	+5.3
12	9	(United Kingdom) Trevor Taylor	Lotus-Climax	2:04.9	2:17.0	+6.1
13	4	(South Africa) Tony Maggs	Cooper-Climax	2:05.2	2:09.3	+6.4
14	17	(United States) Masten Gregory	Lola-Climax	2:05.5	2:11.7	+6.7
15	16	(United States) Jim Hall	Lotus-BRM	2:06.1	2:18.4	+7.3
16	22	(United States) Hap Sharp	Lotus-BRM	2:07.7	2:23.2	+8.9
17	25	(United States) Phil Hill	ATS	No time	2:13.6	+14.8
18	12	(Netherlands) Carel Godin de Beaufort	Porsche	2:14.1	2:23.6	+15.3
19	18	(New Zealand) Chris Amon	Lotus-BRM	2:14.7	2:24.0	+15.9
20	10	(Mexico) Pedro Rodríguez	Lotus-Climax	2:15.3	No time	+16.5
21	26	(Italy) Giancarlo Baghetti	ATS	2:22.3	3:00.5	+23.5
22	20	(United States) Frank Dochnal	Cooper-Climax	No time	No time	

=== Race ===
Pos	No	Driver	Constructor	Laps	Time/Retired	Grid	Points
1	8	(United Kingdom) Jim Clark	Lotus-Climax	65	2:09:52.1	1	9
2	5	(Australia) Jack Brabham	Brabham-Climax	65	+ 1:41.1	10	6
3	2	(United States) Richie Ginther	BRM	65	+ 1:54.7	5	4
4	1	(United Kingdom) Graham Hill	BRM	64	+ 1 lap	3	3
5	11	(Sweden) Jo Bonnier	Cooper-Climax	62	+ 3 laps	8	2
6	6	(United States) Dan Gurney	Brabham-Climax	62	+ 3 laps	4	1
7	22	(United States) Hap Sharp	Lotus-BRM	61	+ 4 laps	16	
8	16	(United States) Jim Hall	Lotus-BRM	61	+ 4 laps	15	
9	14	(Switzerland) Jo Siffert	Lotus-BRM	59	+ 6 laps	9	
10	12	(Netherlands) Carel Godin de Beaufort	Porsche	58	+ 7 laps	18	
11	13	(Mexico) Moisés Solana	BRM	57	Engine	11	
Ret	25	(United States) Phil Hill	ATS	46	Suspension	17	
Ret	24	(Italy) Lorenzo Bandini	Ferrari	36	Ignition	7	
Ret	3	(New Zealand) Bruce McLaren	Cooper-Climax	30	Engine	6	
Ret	10	(Mexico) Pedro Rodríguez	Lotus-Climax	26	Suspension	20	
Ret	17	(United States) Masten Gregory	Lola-Climax	23	Suspension	14	
DSQ	23	(United Kingdom) John Surtees	Ferrari	19	Push start	2	
Ret	9	(United Kingdom) Trevor Taylor	Lotus-Climax	19	Engine	12	
Ret	26	(Italy) Giancarlo Baghetti	ATS	12	Engine	21	
Ret	18	(New Zealand) Chris Amon	Lotus-BRM	9	Gearbox	19	
Ret	4	(South Africa) Tony Maggs	Cooper-Climax	7	Engine	13	
DNQ	20	(United States) Frank Dochnal	Cooper-Climax		Practice accident		
WD	7	(United States) Walt Hansgen	Lotus				
WD	15	(United Kingdom) Innes Ireland	Lotus-BRM		Driver injured		
WD	19	(United States) Thomas Monarch	Lotus-Climax				

- Surtees was disqualified for a push-start.

== Notes ==
- This was the Formula One World Championship debut for Mexican driver Moisés Solana and for American driver Frank Dochnal.

== Championship standings after the race ==
- **Bold text** indicates the World Champions.

Drivers' Championship standings

Pos	Driver	Points
1	(United Kingdom) **Jim Clark**	54 (64)
2	(United States) Richie Ginther	29 (34)
3	(United Kingdom) Graham Hill	25
4	(United Kingdom) John Surtees	22
5	(New Zealand) Bruce McLaren	14

Constructors' Championship standings

	Pos	Constructor	Points
	1	(United Kingdom) **Lotus-Climax**	54 (65)
	2	(United Kingdom) BRM	36 (41)
	3	(Italy) Ferrari	24
1	4	(United Kingdom) Brabham-Climax	24
1	5	(United Kingdom) Cooper-Climax	23

- Notes: Only the top five positions are included for both sets of standings. Only the best 6 results counted towards the Championship. Numbers without parentheses are Championship points; numbers in parentheses are total points scored.

Previous race: 1963 United States Grand Prix	FIA Formula One World Championship; 1963 season	Next race: 1963 South African Grand Prix
Previous race: 1962 Mexican Grand Prix	Mexican Grand Prix	Next race: 1964 Mexican Grand Prix
