= 1963 French Grand Prix =

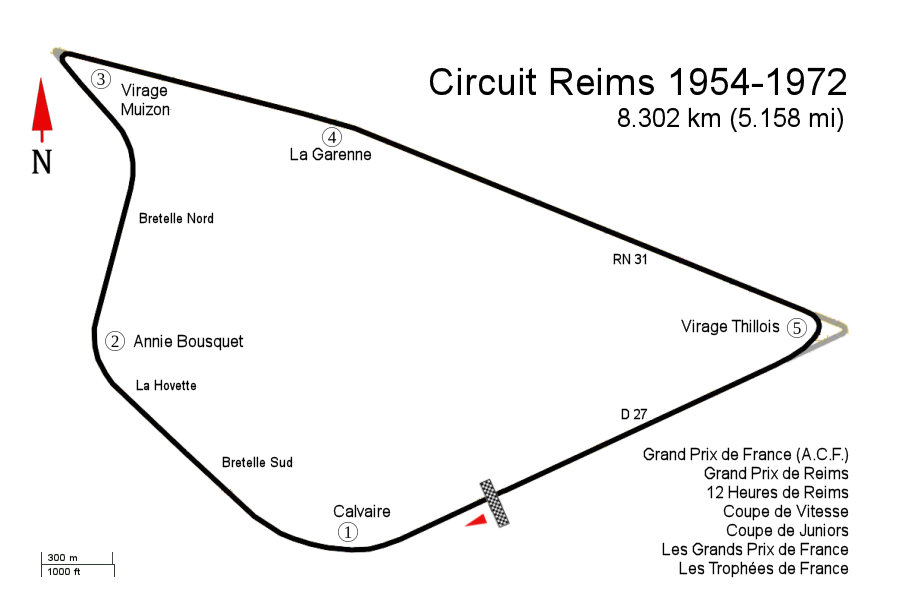

Race details
- Date: 30 June 1963
- Official name: XLIX Grand Prix de l'A.C.F.
- Location: Reims, France
- Course: Permanent racing facility
- Course length: 8.302 km (5.159 miles)
- Distance: 53 laps, 440.006 km (273.407 miles)
- Weather: Sunny, then rain

Pole position
Driver	(United Kingdom) Jim Clark	Lotus-Climax
- Time: 2:20.2

Fastest lap
Driver	(United Kingdom) Jim Clark	Lotus-Climax
- Time: 2:21.6 on lap 12

Podium
First	(United Kingdom) Jim Clark	Lotus-Climax
Second	(South Africa) Tony Maggs	Cooper-Climax
Third	(United Kingdom) Graham Hill	BRM

The 1963 French Grand Prix was a Formula One motor race held at Reims on 30 June 1963. It was race 4 of 10 in both the 1963 World Championship of Drivers and the 1963 International Cup for Formula One Manufacturers. The race was won by Jim Clark driving a Lotus 25-Climax 1.5 litre V8.

== Race report ==
Jim Clark took the lead at the start from Richie Ginther in the BRM. All Graham Hill's hard work in qualifying second despite mechanical problems in practice came to nothing when his engine died on the grid and his car had to be push started. The subsequent one-minute penalty dropped him well back. Clark led dominantly, his lead being extended when a stone pierced Ginther's radiator, forcing him into the pits. Jack Brabham took second place after a strong fight with Trevor Taylor, who also suffered mechanical problems.

Brabham then began to gain significantly on Clark as the Scot's Climax engine started to splutter, however this proved to be a sporadic fault and he had enough of a lead to maintain the position. Brabham himself was delayed when an ignition lead came loose, handing second and third to Tony Maggs and a delighted Hill. Clark was over a minute ahead of them after yet another start-to-finish victory. Graham Hill was push started, incurring a one-minute penalty from the organisers, and was awarded no championship points for his third place. By finishing 7th, at 19 years and 345 days old, Chris Amon became the youngest driver to finish a world championship race. This record would hold for another 38 years, until it was broken by Fernando Alonso at the 2001 Australian Grand Prix.

== Classification ==
=== Qualifying ===
Pos	No	Driver	Constructor	Qualifying times			Gap
Pos	No	Driver	Constructor	Q1	Q2	Q3	Gap
1	18	(United Kingdom) Jim Clark	Lotus-Climax	2:21.0	No time	2:20.2	—
2	2	(United Kingdom) Graham Hill	BRM	3:13.4	2:36.4	2:20.9	+0.7
3	8	(United States) Dan Gurney	Brabham-Climax	No time	3:02.4	2:21.7	+1.5
4	16	(United Kingdom) John Surtees	Ferrari	2:24.4	2:33.8	2:21.9	+1.7
5	6	(Australia) Jack Brabham	Brabham-Climax	No time	2:39.2	2:21.9	+1.7
6	10	(New Zealand) Bruce McLaren	Cooper-Climax	2:25.1	No time	2:22.5	+2.3
7	20	(United Kingdom) Trevor Taylor	Lotus-Climax	2:23.7	No time	2:25.1	+3.5
8	12	(South Africa) Tony Maggs	Cooper-Climax	2:24.5	No time	2:24.4	+4.2
9	32	(United Kingdom) Innes Ireland	BRP-BRM	No time	2:41.8	2:25.1	+4.9
10	36	(Switzerland) Jo Siffert	Lotus-BRM	2:26.9	No time	2:25.2	+5.0
11	44	(Sweden) Jo Bonnier	Cooper-Climax	2:26.5	2:40.5	2:25.7	+5.5
12	4	(United States) Richie Ginther	BRM	2:26.8	2:40.0	2:25.9	+5.7
13	14	(Italy) Ludovico Scarfiotti	Ferrari	2:27.0	2:41.6	No time	+6.8
14	42	(United States) Phil Hill	Lotus-BRM	No time	No time	2:27.7	+7.5
15	28	(France) Maurice Trintignant	Lotus-Climax	No time	2:49.5	2:28.3	+8.1
16	22	(United Kingdom) Peter Arundell	Lotus-Climax	2:28.5	—	—	+8.3
17	30	(New Zealand) Chris Amon	Lola-Climax	No time	2:53.1	2:30.5	+10.3
18	34	(United States) Jim Hall	Lotus-BRM	No time	3:25.2	2:30.9	+10.7
19	48	(United States) Masten Gregory	Lotus-BRM	No time	No time	2:33.2	+13.0
20	38	(United States) Tony Settember	Scirocco-BRM	No time	2:54.5	2:36.7	+16.5
21	46	(Italy) Lorenzo Bandini	BRM	No time	No time	2:37.8	+17.6

=== Race ===
Pos	No	Driver	Constructor	Laps	Time/Retired	Grid	Points
1	18	(United Kingdom) Jim Clark	Lotus-Climax	53	2:10:54.3	1	9
2	12	(South Africa) Tony Maggs	Cooper-Climax	53	+ 1:04.9	8	6
3	2	(United Kingdom) Graham Hill	BRM	53	+ 1:13.9	2	
4	6	(Australia) Jack Brabham	Brabham-Climax	53	+ 2:15.2	5	3
5	8	(United States) Dan Gurney	Brabham-Climax	53	+ 2:33.4	3	2
6	36	(Switzerland) Jo Siffert	Lotus-BRM	52	+ 1 lap	10	1
7	30	(New Zealand) Chris Amon	Lola-Climax	51	+ 2 laps	17	
8	28	(France) Maurice Trintignant	Lotus-Climax	50	+ 3 laps	15	
9	32	(United Kingdom) Innes Ireland	BRP-BRM	49	+ 4 laps	9	
10	46	(Italy) Lorenzo Bandini	BRM	45	+ 8 laps	21	
11	34	(United States) Jim Hall	Lotus-BRM	45	+ 8 laps	18	
12	10	(New Zealand) Bruce McLaren	Cooper-Climax	42	Ignition	6	
13	20	(United Kingdom) Trevor Taylor	Lotus-Climax	41	Suspension	7	
NC	42	(United States) Phil Hill	Lotus-BRM	34	Not Classified	14	
NC	44	(Sweden) Jo Bonnier	Cooper-Climax	32	Not Classified	11	
Ret	48	(United States) Masten Gregory	Lotus-BRM	30	Gearbox	19	
Ret	16	(United Kingdom) John Surtees	Ferrari	12	Fuel Pump	4	
Ret	38	(United States) Tony Settember	Scirocco-BRM	5	Wheel Bearing	20	
Ret	4	(United States) Richie Ginther	BRM	4	Radiator	12	
DNS	14	(Italy) Ludovico Scarfiotti	Ferrari		Practice Accident		
DNS	22	(United Kingdom) Peter Arundell	Lotus-Climax		Entry denied; support race		
WD	26	(Italy) Giancarlo Baghetti	ATS				
WD	40	(United Kingdom) Ian Burgess	Scirocco-BRM		Car not ready		
WD	50	(Argentina) Nasif Estéfano	De Tomaso		Car not ready		

- Phil Hill was originally entered as car #24, to drive the ATS. When the ATS team withdrew, he switched to drive the Scuderia Filipinetti Lotus-BRM.

== Notes ==
- This was the Formula One World Championship debut for British driver Peter Arundell.
- This was the 100th Formula One World Championship race where a British driver participated. By 1963, Great Britain was the most successful nation in Formula One. Of those 100 races, British drivers had won 39, had 95 podiums, 38 pole positions, 43 fastest laps and 3 World Championships. Only Argentinians had more World Championships - by courtesy of Juan Manuel Fangio's five titles - but by the end of 1965 the British drivers would surpass that record as well.

== Championship standings after the race ==
Drivers' Championship standings

	Pos	Driver	Points
	1	(United Kingdom) Jim Clark	27
2	2	(United States) Dan Gurney	12
1	3	(United States) Richie Ginther	11
1	4	(New Zealand) Bruce McLaren	10
	5	(United Kingdom) Graham Hill	9

Constructors' Championship standings

	Pos	Constructor	Points
	1	(United Kingdom) Lotus-Climax	28
1	2	(United Kingdom) Cooper-Climax	16
1	3	(United Kingdom) BRM	14
	4	(United Kingdom) Brabham-Climax	13
	5	(Italy) Ferrari	7

- Notes: Only the top five positions are included for both sets of standings.

Previous race: 1963 Dutch Grand Prix	FIA Formula One World Championship; 1963 season	Next race: 1963 British Grand Prix
Previous race: 1962 French Grand Prix	French Grand Prix	Next race: 1964 French Grand Prix
