= 1957 Lady Wigram Trophy =

1957 Lady Wigram Grand Prix
- 6th Lady Wigram Trophy
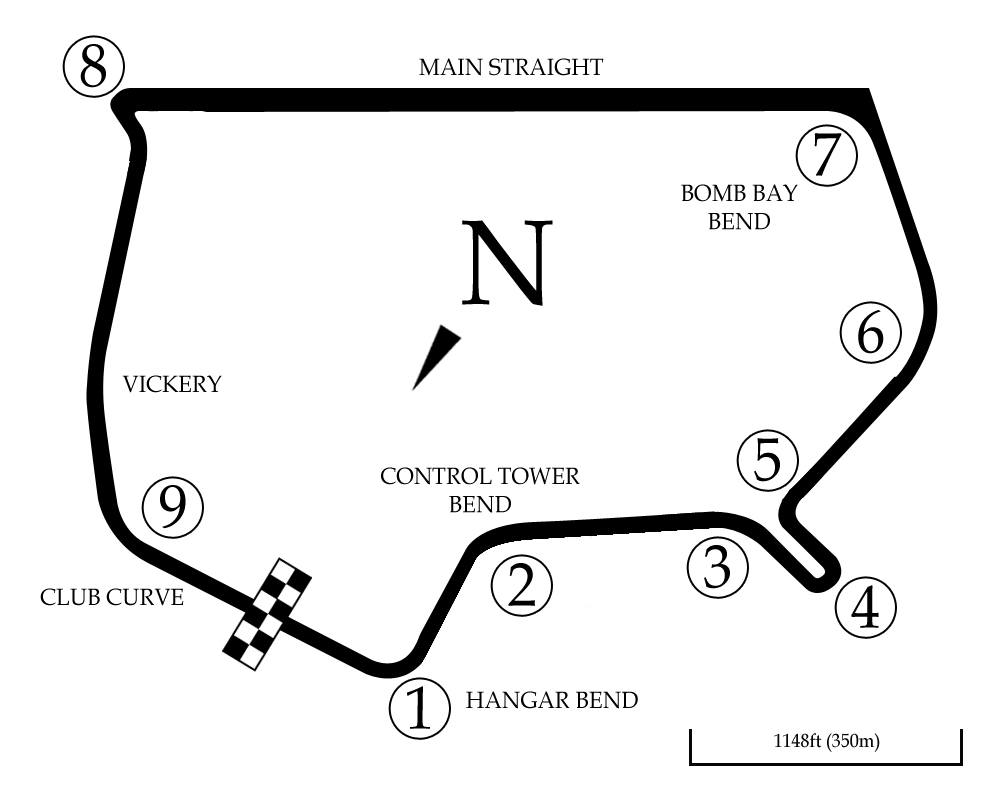

Race details
- Date: 25 January 1957
- Location: Wigram Airfield Circuit, Christchurch, New Zealand
- Course: Temporary racing facility
- Course length: 3.403 km (2.116 miles)
- Distance: 71 laps, 241.77 km (150.23 miles)
- Weather: Fine

Pole position
Driver	(New Zealand) Ron Roycroft	Ferrari 375
- Time: Determined by heats

Fastest lap
Driver	(United Kingdom) Peter Whitehead	Ferrari 555/860
- Time: 1:30.6

Podium
First	(United Kingdom) Peter Whitehead	Ferrari 555/860
Second	(Australia) Jack Brabham	Cooper T41
Third	(New Zealand) Ron Roycroft	Ferrari 375

The 1957 Lady Wigram Trophy was a motor race held at the Wigram Airfield Circuit on 25 January 1957. It was the sixth Lady Wigram Trophy to be held and was won by Peter Whitehead in the Ferrari 555/860 for the third time in succession.

== Classification ==
Pos	No.	Driver	Car	Laps	Time	Grid
1		(United Kingdom) Peter Whitehead	Ferrari 555/860 / Ferrari 3431cc 4cyl	71	1hr 50min 08sec	2
2		(Australia) Jack Brabham	Cooper T41 / Climax 1460cc 4cyl	71	+ 1:28.0 s	4
3		(New Zealand) Ron Roycroft	Ferrari 375 / Ferrari 4493cc V12	70	+ 1 Lap	1
4		(New Zealand) Ross Jensen	Ferrari 750 Monza / Ferrari 2999cc 4cyl	68	+ 3 Laps	9
5		(New Zealand) Syd Jensen	Cooper T41 / Climax 1460cc 4cyl	68	+ 3 Laps	6
6		(New Zealand) Bob Gibbons	Jaguar D-Type / Jaguar 3442cc 6cyl	67	+ 4 Laps	5
7		(New Zealand) Allan Freeman	Talbot-Lago 26C / Talbot 4485cc 6cyl			11
Ret		(United Kingdom) Horace Gould	Maserati 250F / Maserati 2497cc 6cyl	51	Exhaustion	7
Ret		(United Kingdom) Reg Parnell	Ferrari 555/860 / Ferrari 3431cc 4cyl	8	Engine	3
		(New Zealand) Frank Shuter	Maserati 8CM / Maserati 2992cc 8cyl s/c			8
		(New Zealand) Tom Clark	HWM / Alta 1960cc 4cyl s/c			10
		(New Zealand) Pat Hoare	Maserati 4CLT-48 / Maserati 1498cc 4cyl s/c			12
		(New Zealand) Reg McCutcheon	Normac Special / Chevrolet 3870cc 6cyl			13
		(New Zealand) Ronnie Moore	Cooper T39 / Climax 1098cc 4cyl			14
		(New Zealand) Alex MacKay	Cooper T39 / Climax 1098cc 4cyl			15
		(New Zealand) John McMillan	Alfa Romeo Tipo B / Alfa 2905cc 8cyl s/c			16
		(New Zealand) Bruce McLaren	Austin-Healey 100/4 / Austin 2660cc 4cyl			17
		(New Zealand) George Palmer	Cooper-Bristol Mk II / Bristol 1971cc 6cyl			18
		(New Zealand) Bill Crosbie	CJ-Sapphire / Armstrong-Siddeley 3435cc 6cyl			19
		(New Zealand) Jim Boyd	Buckler DD1 / Climax 1098cc 4cyl			20
		(New Zealand) Wally Darrell	ACE III / Ford 2622cc 6cyl			21
		(New Zealand) Bruce Wood	Staride 52 / JAP 497cc 1cyl			22
		(New Zealand) Neil Stuart	Stuart Special / Mercury 4013cc V8			23
		(New Zealand) Arnold Stafford	Cooper Mk IX / Norton 515cc 1cyl			24
		(New Zealand) Ron Frost	Cooper Mk IX / Norton 515cc 1cyl			25
		(New Zealand) Dave Caldwell	Alfa Romeo Tipo B / Alfa 2905cc 8cyl s/c			26
DNA		(New Zealand) Les Paterson	Ransley / Riley 2443cc 6cyl s/c		Did Not Start	

Sporting positions
Preceded by 1956 Lady Wigram Trophy	Lady Wigram Trophy; 1957	Succeeded by 1958 Lady Wigram Trophy
