= 1958 Lady Wigram Trophy =

1958 Lady Wigram Grand Prix
- 7th Lady Wigram Trophy
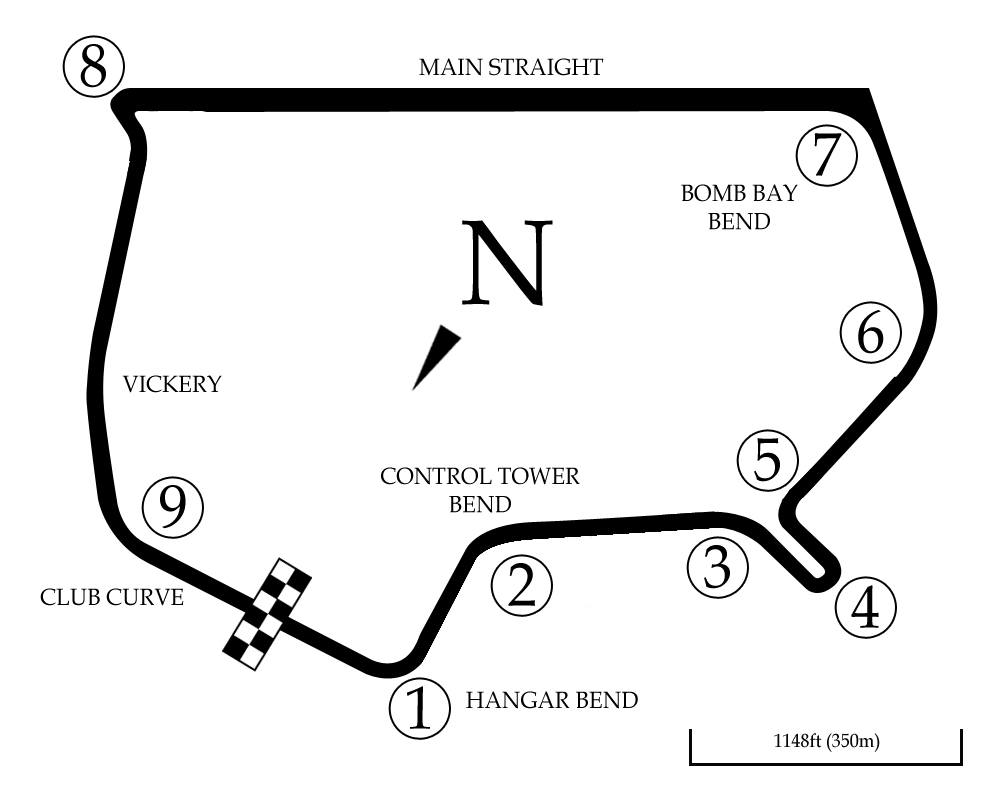

Race details
- Date: 25 January 1958
- Location: Wigram Airfield Circuit, Christchurch, New Zealand
- Course: Temporary racing facility
- Course length: 3.403 km (2.116 miles)
- Distance: 71 laps, 241.77 km (150.23 miles)
- Weather: Fine

Pole position
Driver	(United Kingdom) Archie Scott Brown	Lister 57/1
- Time: Determined by heats

Fastest lap
Driver	(United Kingdom) Archie Scott Brown	Lister 57/1
- Time: 1:27.5

Podium
First	(United Kingdom) Archie Scott Brown	Lister 57/1
Second	(New Zealand) Ross Jensen	Maserati 250F
Third	(United Kingdom) Stuart Lewis-Evans	Connaught B-Type

The 1958 Lady Wigram Trophy was a motor race held at the Wigram Airfield Circuit on 25 January 1958. It was the seventh Lady Wigram Trophy to be held and was won by Archie Scott Brown in the Lister 57/1. This would prove to be one of Scott Brown's last victories before his untimely death at Spa-Francorchamps later that year.

== Classification ==
Pos	No.	Driver	Car	Laps	Time	Grid
1		(United Kingdom) Archie Scott Brown	Lister 57/1 / Jaguar 3781cc 6cyl	71	1hr 47min 33.4sec	1
2		(New Zealand) Ross Jensen	Maserati 250F / Maserati 2497cc 6cyl	71	+ 45.1 s	3
3		(United Kingdom) Stuart Lewis-Evans	Connaught B-Type / Alta 2470cc 4cyl	71	+ 1:38.3 s	2
4		(New Zealand) Pat Hoare	Ferrari 625 / Ferrari 2996cc 4cyl	69	+ 2 Laps	7
5		(New Zealand) Merv Mayo	Cooper T41 / Climax 1460cc 4cyl	67	+ 4 Laps	
6		(Australia) Arnold Glass	Ferrari Super Squalo 555 / Ferrari 3431cc 4cyl	66	+ 5 Laps	
7		(New Zealand) Duncan Rutherford	Lycoming Special / Lycoming 4733cc 4cyl			
8		(New Zealand) Ron Roycroft	Ferrari 375 / Ferrari 4493cc V12			
9		(New Zealand) Gavin Quirk	Maserati 250F / Maserati 2497cc 6cyl			
10		(New Zealand) Ralph Watson	Lycoming Special / Lycoming 4733cc 4cyl			
11		(New Zealand) Bob Gibbons	Jaguar D-Type / Jaguar 3442cc 6cyl			
Ret		(New Zealand) Bruce McLaren	Cooper T43 / Climax 1750cc 4cyl	66	Gearbox	4
Ret		(Australia) Jack Brabham	Cooper T43 / Climax 2249cc 4cyl	29	Gearbox	
Ret		(United Kingdom) Roy Salvadori	Connaught B-Type / Alta 2470cc 4cyl		Retired	
Ret		(New Zealand) Frank Cantwell	Tojeiro 3/56 / Jaguar 3442cc 6cyl		Tyre	6
		(United Kingdom) Dick Gibson	Cooper T43 / Climax 1496cc 4cyl			
		(New Zealand) Ken Harris	Ferrari 750 Monza / Ferrari 2999cc 4cyl			
		(New Zealand) Merv Neil	Cooper T39 / Climax 1498cc 4cyl			
		(New Zealand) Frank Shuter	Maserati 8CLT-50 / Maserati 2984cc 8cyl s/c			
		(New Zealand) Ernie Sprague	Maserati 4CLT-48 / Maserati 1498cc 4cyl s/c			
		(New Zealand) Graham Pierce	Austin-Healey 100S / Austin 2660cc 4cyl			
		(New Zealand) Arthur Kennard	Healey-Corvette / Chevrolet 4342cc V8			
		(New Zealand) Ian Mackellar	Cooper T39 / Climax 1098cc 4cyl			
		(New Zealand) Geoff Mardon	RA Vanguard / Vanguard 2088cc 4cyl s/c			
		(New Zealand) Bruce Wood	Staride 52 / JAP 497cc 1cyl			
		(New Zealand) Wally Darrell	ACE III / Ford 2584cc 6cyl			

Sporting positions
Preceded by 1957 Lady Wigram Trophy	Lady Wigram Trophy; 1958	Succeeded by 1959 Lady Wigram Trophy
