= 1959 Lady Wigram Trophy =

1959 Lady Wigram Grand Prix
- 8th Lady Wigram Trophy
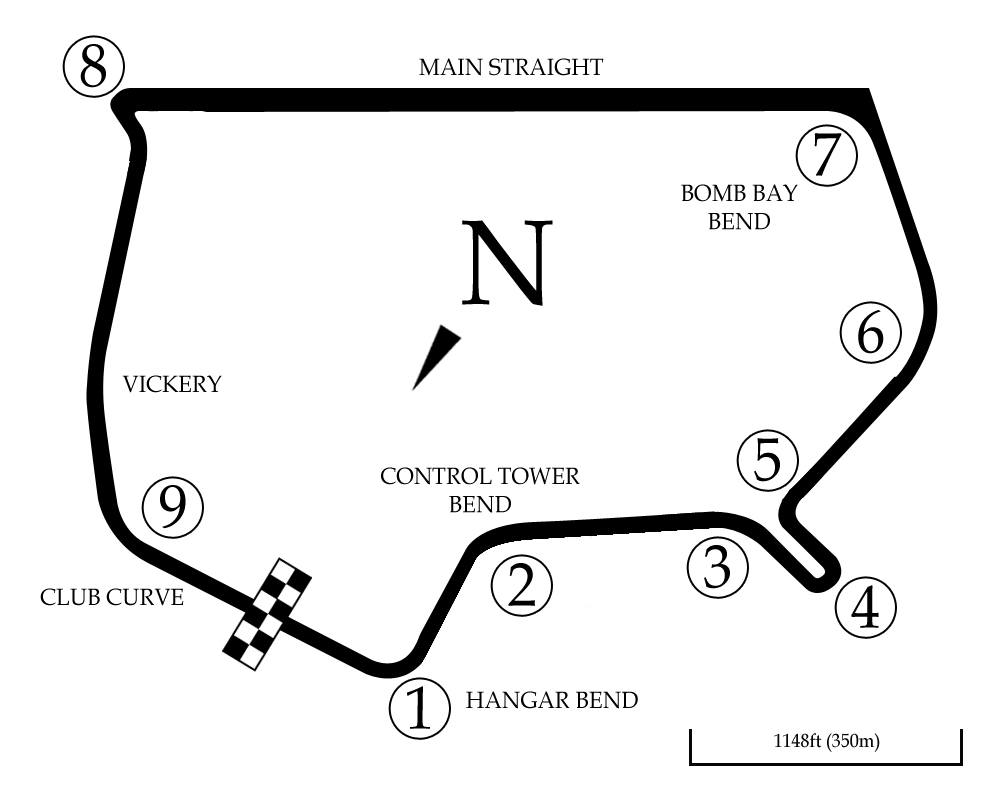

Race details
- Date: 24 January 1959
- Location: Wigram Airfield Circuit, Christchurch, New Zealand
- Course: Temporary racing facility
- Course length: 3.403 km (2.116 miles)
- Distance: 71 laps, 241.77 km (150.23 miles)
- Weather: Fine

Pole position
Driver	(United Kingdom) Ron Flockhart	BRM P25
- Time: Determined by heats

Fastest lap
Driver	(United Kingdom) Ron Flockhart	BRM P25
- Time: 1:22.2

Podium
First	(United Kingdom) Ron Flockhart	BRM P25
Second	(Australia) Jack Brabham	Cooper T45
Third	(New Zealand) Bruce McLaren	Cooper T45

The 1959 Lady Wigram Trophy was a motor race held at the Wigram Airfield Circuit on 24 January 1959. It was the eighth Lady Wigram Trophy to be held and was won by Ron Flockhart in the BRM P25.

== Classification ==
Pos	No.	Driver	Car	Laps	Time	Grid
1		(United Kingdom) Ron Flockhart	BRM P25 / BRM 2497cc 4cyl	71	1hr 41min 04.0sec	1
2		(Australia) Jack Brabham	Cooper T45 / Climax 2202cc 4cyl	71	+ 2.7 s	2
3		(New Zealand) Bruce McLaren	Cooper T45 / Climax 1964cc 4cyl	69	+ 2 Laps	3
4		(New Zealand) Syd Jensen	Cooper T45 / Climax 1460cc 4cyl	68	+ 3 Laps	5
5		(New Zealand) Johnny Mansel	Maserati 250F / Maserati 2497cc 6cyl	67	+ 4 Laps	7
6		(New Zealand) Bob Gibbons	Lycoming Special / Lycoming 4733cc 4cyl	66	+ 5 Laps	9
7		(New Zealand) Merv Neil	Cooper T45 / Climax 1960cc 4cyl			17
8		(New Zealand) Len Gilbert	Cooper-Bristol Mk II / Bristol 1971cc 6cyl			10
9		(New Zealand) Tom Clark	Ferrari Super Squalo 555 / Ferrari 3431cc 4cyl			6
10		(New Zealand) Ken Harris	Ferrari 750 Monza / Ferrari 2999cc 4cyl			27
11		(New Zealand) Jim Palmer	Lotus 11 / Climax 1098cc 4cyl			16
12		(New Zealand) Roly Lewis	RAL / Ford 1172cc 4cyl			24
13		(New Zealand) George Lawton	Cooper T39 / Climax 1498cc 4cyl			13
14		(New Zealand) Graham Pierce	Austin-Healey 100S / Austin 2660cc 4cyl			15
15		(New Zealand) Max Richards	Austin-Healey 100S / Austin 2660cc 4cyl			20
16		(New Zealand) David Young	Jaguar C-Type / Jaguar 3442cc 6cyl			21
17		(New Zealand) R.A. Beggs	Mistral / Ford 1172cc 4cyl			23
18		(New Zealand) Mick Jennings	MGA TC / MG 1600c 4cyl			24
19		(New Zealand) Brian Blackburn	Citroen Special / Citroen 1991cc 4cyl			18
20		(New Zealand) Wally Darrell	ACE III / Ford 2584cc 6cyl			
Ret		(New Zealand) Dick Campbell	Maserati 4CLT-48 / Maserati 1498cc 4cyl s/c		Retired	14
Ret		(New Zealand) Frank Cantwell	Tojeiro 3/56 / Jaguar 3442cc 6cyl		Brakes	11
Ret		(New Zealand) Reg McCutcheon	Normac Special III / Chevrolet 3930cc 6cyl		Retired	
Ret		(New Zealand) Ken MacMillan	Cooper T39 / Climax 1098cc 4cyl		Retired	19
Ret		(New Zealand) John Cullen	Cullen 500 / Norton 498cc 1cyl		Retired	
Ret		(New Zealand) Tony Shelly	Cooper T41 / Climax 1496cc 4cyl		Retired	28
Ret		(New Zealand) Frank Shuter	Maserati 8CM / Maserati 2992cc 8cyl s/c		Gearbox	12
Ret		(New Zealand) Arthur Kennard	Healey-Corvette / Chevrolet 4342cc V8		Retired	22
Ret		(New Zealand) Pat Hoare	Ferrari 625 / Ferrari 2996cc 4cyl	7	Piston	8
Ret		(New Zealand) Ross Jensen	Maserati 250F / Maserati 2493cc 6cyl	4	Transmission	4
Ret		(New Zealand) Bruce Wood	Cooper Mk X / Norton 498cc 1cyl		Retired	
Ret		(New Zealand) Bob Watson	Puma / Austin 948cc 4cyl		Retired	26

Sporting positions
Preceded by 1958 Lady Wigram Trophy	Lady Wigram Trophy; 1959	Succeeded by 1960 Lady Wigram Trophy
