= 1952 Lady Wigram Trophy =

1952 Lady Wigram Grand Prix
- 2nd Lady Wigram Trophy
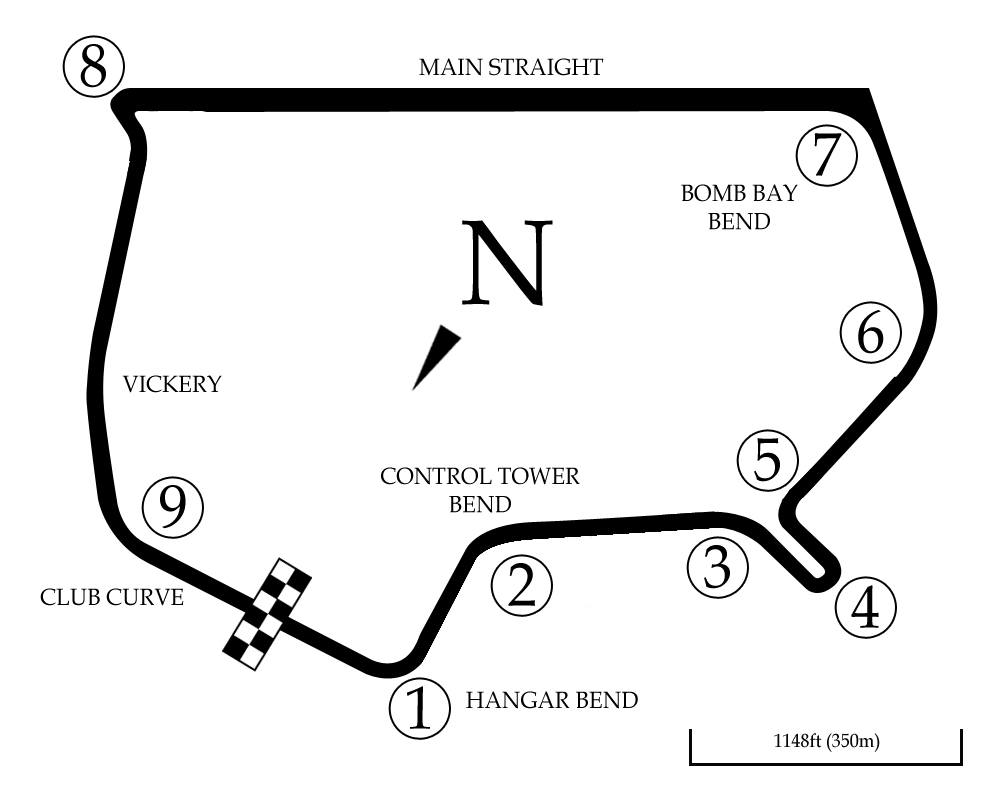

Race details
- Date: 23 February 1952
- Location: Wigram Airfield Circuit, Christchurch, New Zealand
- Course: Temporary racing facility
- Course length: 3.403 km (2.116 miles)
- Distance: 24 laps, 81.672 km (50.784 miles)
- Weather: Fine

Pole position
Driver	(New Zealand) Bob Gibbons	Cooper Mk V
- Time: Determined by heats

Fastest lap
Driver	(New Zealand) Bob Gibbons	Cooper Mk V
- Time: 1:33.0

Podium
First	(New Zealand) Les Moore	Alfa Romeo Tipo B
Second	(Australia) Tom Sulman	Maserati 4CM
Third	(New Zealand) Frank Shuter	V8 Special

The 1952 Lady Wigram Trophy was a motor race held at the Wigram Airfield Circuit on 23 February 1952. It was the second Lady Wigram Trophy to be held and was won by Les Moore in the Alfa Romeo Tipo B for the second time in succession.

== Classification ==
Pos	No.	Driver	Car	Laps	Time	Grid
1		(New Zealand) Les Moore	Alfa Romeo Tipo B / Alfa 2905cc 8cyl s/c	24	39min 04sec	4
2		(Australia) Tom Sulman	Maserati 4CM / Maserati 1496cc 4cyl s/c	24	+ 1:36.0 s	3
3		(New Zealand) Frank Shuter	V8 Special / Mercury 3992c V8	24	+ 3:31.0 s	18
4		(New Zealand) Halsey Logan	Logan Special / Mercury 4024cc V8			16
5		(New Zealand) Des Wild	Allard J2 / Ford 3907cc V8			7
6		(New Zealand) Arnold Stafford	Cooper Mk IV / Norton 498cc 1cyl			8
7		(New Zealand) Sybil Lupp	MG TD / MG 1250cc 4cyl s/c			19
8		(New Zealand) Doug Haigh	Ford 10 Special / Ford 1168cc 4cyl			12
9		(New Zealand) Pat Hoare	HRG / Singer 1498cc 4cyl s/c			11
10		(New Zealand) Jack Tutton	Jaguar C-Type / Jaguar 3442cc 6cyl			10
11	28	(New Zealand) John McMillan	McMillan Special / Ford 3876cc V8			9
12		(New Zealand) Del Drewery	Singer Special / Singer 972cc 4cyl			14
13		(New Zealand) Ron Hurst	Ford 10 Special / Ford 1172cc 4cyl			13
Ret		(New Zealand) George Smith	GeeCeeEss / Mercury 4505cc V8	20	Puncture	2
Ret		(New Zealand) Ronnie Moore	Kieft C50 / Vincent 998cc V2 s/c	17	Accident	15
Ret		(New Zealand) Don Ransley	Alfa Romeo 8C / Alfa 2330cc 8cyl s/c	17	Accident	6
Ret		(New Zealand) Hec Green	RA Vanguard / Vanguard 2088cc 4cyl s/c	14	Gearbox	5
Ret		(New Zealand) Hec McLean	Cooper Mk II / JAP 1098cc V2	3	Broken Chain	17
Ret		(New Zealand) Bob Gibbons	Cooper Mk V | JAP 1098cc V2	3	Engine	1
DNS		(New Zealand) Harold Bandy	RA Vauxhall /Vauxhall 1442cc 4cyl		Did Not Start	
DNS		(New Zealand) Alec Ferguson	Fiat Special / Fiat 1098cc 4cyl		Did Not Start	
DNS		(New Zealand) Wally Darrell	Vauxhall Special / Vauxhall 1300cc 4cyl		Did Not Start	
DNS		(New Zealand) Dave Habgood	Cragar-Ford / Ford 3439cc 4cyl		Did Not Start	

Sporting positions
Preceded by 1951 Lady Wigram Trophy	Lady Wigram Trophy; 1952	Succeeded by 1953 Lady Wigram Trophy
