= 1951 Lady Wigram Trophy =

1951 Lady Wigram Grand Prix
- 1st Lady Wigram Trophy
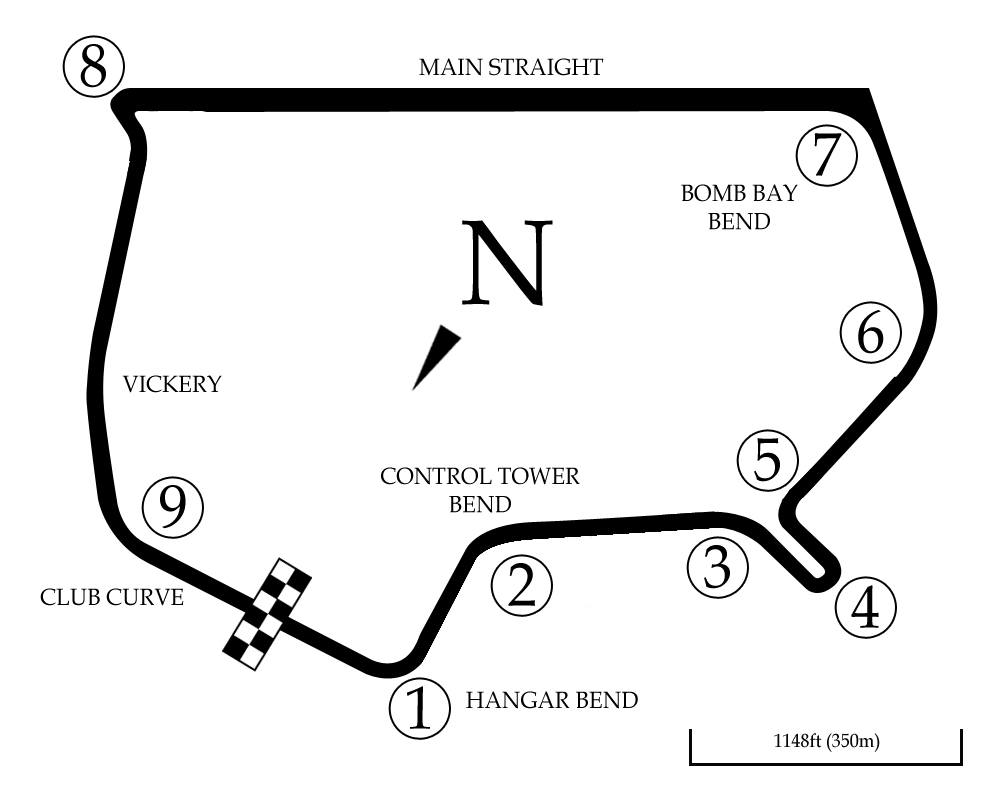

Race details
- Date: 31 March 1951
- Location: Wigram Airfield Circuit, Christchurch, New Zealand
- Course: Temporary racing facility
- Course length: 3.403 km (2.116 miles)
- Distance: 48 laps, 163.344 km (101.568 miles)
- Weather: Wet

Pole position
Driver	(New Zealand) George Smith	GeeCeeEss
- Time: Determined by heats

Fastest lap
Driver	(New Zealand) George Smith	GeeCeeEss
- Time: 1:42.0

Podium
First	(New Zealand) Les Moore	Alfa Romeo Tipo B
Second	(New Zealand) Ron Roycroft	Jaguar XK120
Third	(New Zealand) Frank Shuter	V8 Special

The 1951 Lady Wigram Trophy was a motor race held at the Wigram Airfield Circuit in New Zealand on 31 March 1951. It was the first Lady Wigram Trophy to be held and was won by Les Moore in the Alfa Romeo Tipo B.

== Classification ==
Pos	No.	Driver	Car	Laps	Time	Grid
1		(New Zealand) Les Moore	Alfa Romeo Tipo B / Alfa 2905cc 8cyl s/c	48	1hr 27min 41sec	4
2	10	(New Zealand) Ron Roycroft	Jaguar XK120 / Jaguar 3442cc 6cyl	48	+ 3:30.0 s	2
3		(New Zealand) Frank Shuter	V8 Special / Ford 4024cc V8	48	+ 4:34.0 s	3
4		(New Zealand) John McMillan	McMillan Special / Ford 2300cc 4cyl	48	+ 13:06.0 s	11
5		(New Zealand) Del Drewery	Singer Special / Singer 972cc 4cyl	48	+ 15:35.0 s	15
6		(New Zealand) Pat Hoare	RA Vauxhall / Vauxhall 1442cc 4cyl s/c	48	+ 18:45.0 s	19
7		(New Zealand) Jack Brewer	Wolseley Special / Wolseley 1604cc 6cyl	48	+ 19:31.0 s	10
8		(New Zealand) Bob Blackburn	Austin 7 Special / Austin 747cc 4cyl			14
9		(New Zealand) Jack Tucker	V8 Special / Ford 3622cc V8 s/c			16
10		(New Zealand) Jack Tutton	Jaguar C-Type / Jaguar 3442cc 6cyl			17
11		(New Zealand) Fred Sharman	V8 Special / Ford 3622cc V8 s/c			18
12		(New Zealand) Don Ransley	Alfa Romeo 8C / Alfa 2300cc 8cyl s/c			6
Ret		(New Zealand) Des Wild	RA III / Fiat 1098cc 4cyl	39	Engine	8
Ret		(New Zealand) George Smith	GeeCeeEss / Mercury 4024cc V8	37	Engine	8
Ret		(New Zealand) Ron Symmons	Cooper Mk II / JAP 1098cc V2	30	Gearbox	13
Ret		(Australia) Tom Sulman	Maserati 4CM / Maserati 1496cc 4cyl s/c	9	Engine	7
Ret		(New Zealand) Halsey Logan	Logan Special / Mercury 4024cc V8	7	Accident	12
Ret		(Australia) Ken Tubman	MG K3 Magnette / MG 1086cc 6cyl s/c	7	Engine	9
Ret		(Australia) John Nind	Cooper Mk III / JAP 1098cc V2	0	Accident	5
DNS		(New Zealand) Hec Green	RA Vanguard / Vanguard 2088cc 4cyl s/c\		Did Not Start	
DNS		(New Zealand) Arthur Moffatt	Austin 7 Special / Austin 747cc 4cyl s/c		Did Not Start	
DNS		(New Zealand) Fred Zambucka	DeSoto Special / DeSoto 4099cc 6cyl		Did Not Start	
DNS		(New Zealand) Ron Jeal	MG J2 Special / MG 847cc 4cyl		Did Not Start	
DNA		(New Zealand) Dave Habgood	Cragar-Ford / Ford 3439cc 4cyl		Did Not Attend	

Sporting positions
Preceded by none	Lady Wigram Trophy; 1951	Succeeded by 1952 Lady Wigram Trophy
