= 1964 Lady Wigram Trophy =

1964 Lady Wigram Grand Prix
- 13th Lady Wigram Trophy
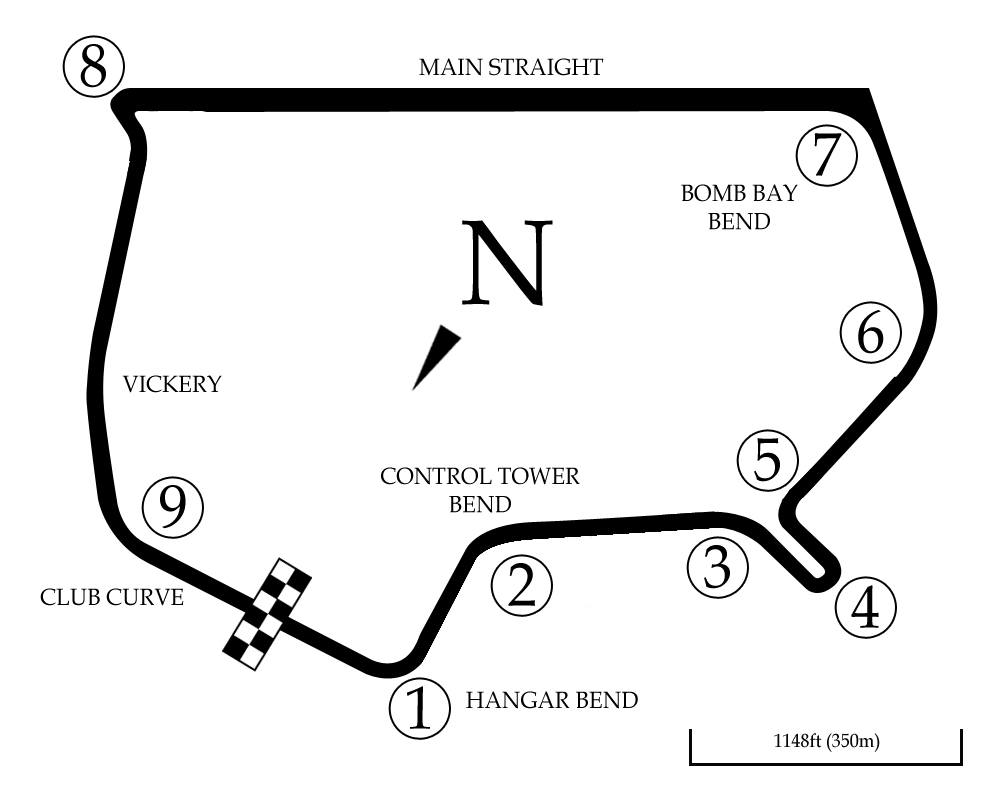

Race details
- Date: 18 January 1964
- Location: Wigram Airfield Circuit, Christchurch, New Zealand
- Course: Temporary racing facility
- Course length: 3.403 km (2.116 miles)
- Distance: 44 laps, 164.14 km (101.99 miles)
- Weather: Fine

Pole position
Driver	(Australia) Jack Brabham	Brabham BT4
- Time: Determined by heats

Fastest lap
Driver	(New Zealand) Denny Hulme	Brabham BT4
- Time: 1:26.9

Podium
First	(New Zealand) Bruce McLaren	Cooper T70
Second	(Australia) Jack Brabham	Brabham BT7A
Third	(New Zealand) Denny Hulme	Brabham BT4

The 1964 Lady Wigram Trophy was a motor race held at the Wigram Airfield Circuit on 18 January 1964. It was the thirteenth Lady Wigram Trophy to be held and was won by Bruce McLaren for the second year in succession in the Cooper T70. After having started eighth after a dismal performance in the preliminary heat, McLaren came through the pack to take the win in what he described as his greatest performance. Jack Brabham took second place after a strong performance throughout the weekend whilst Denny Hulme came home third after losing second on the final lap due to engine bearing issues.

== Classification ==
Pos	No.	Driver	Car	Laps	Time	Grid
1	47	(New Zealand) Bruce McLaren	Cooper T70-Climax	44	1hr 05min 00.8sec	8
2	4	(Australia) Jack Brabham	Brabham BT7A-Climax	44	+ 8.0 s	1
3	3	(New Zealand) Denny Hulme	Brabham BT4-Climax	44	+ 23.2 s	2
4	5	(Australia) John Youl	Cooper T55-Climax	44	+ 1:23.0 s	3
5	41	(New Zealand) Jim Palmer	Cooper T53-Climax	43	+ 1 Lap	5
6	17	(New Zealand) Tony Shelly	Lotus 18/21-Climax	42	+ 2 Laps	7
7	25	(New Zealand) Rex Flowers	Lotus 20B-Ford	42	+ 2 Laps	10
8	48	(United States) Timmy Mayer	Cooper T70-Climax	41	+ 3 Laps	4
9	8	(New Zealand) Andy Buchanan	Brabham BT6-Ford	41	+ 3 Laps	9
10	22	(New Zealand) Roly Levis	Lotus 22-Ford	40	+ 4 Laps	11
11	7	(New Zealand) Ken Sager	Lotus 20B-Ford	37	+ 7 Laps	12
Ret	1	(New Zealand) Chris Amon	Lola T4-Climax	26	Suspension	6
Ret	6	(New Zealand) David Young	Cooper T65-Ford		Retired	13

Sporting positions
Preceded by 1963 Lady Wigram Trophy	Lady Wigram Trophy; 1964	Succeeded by 1965 Lady Wigram Trophy
