= 1965 Lady Wigram Trophy =

1965 Lady Wigram Grand Prix
- 14th Lady Wigram Trophy
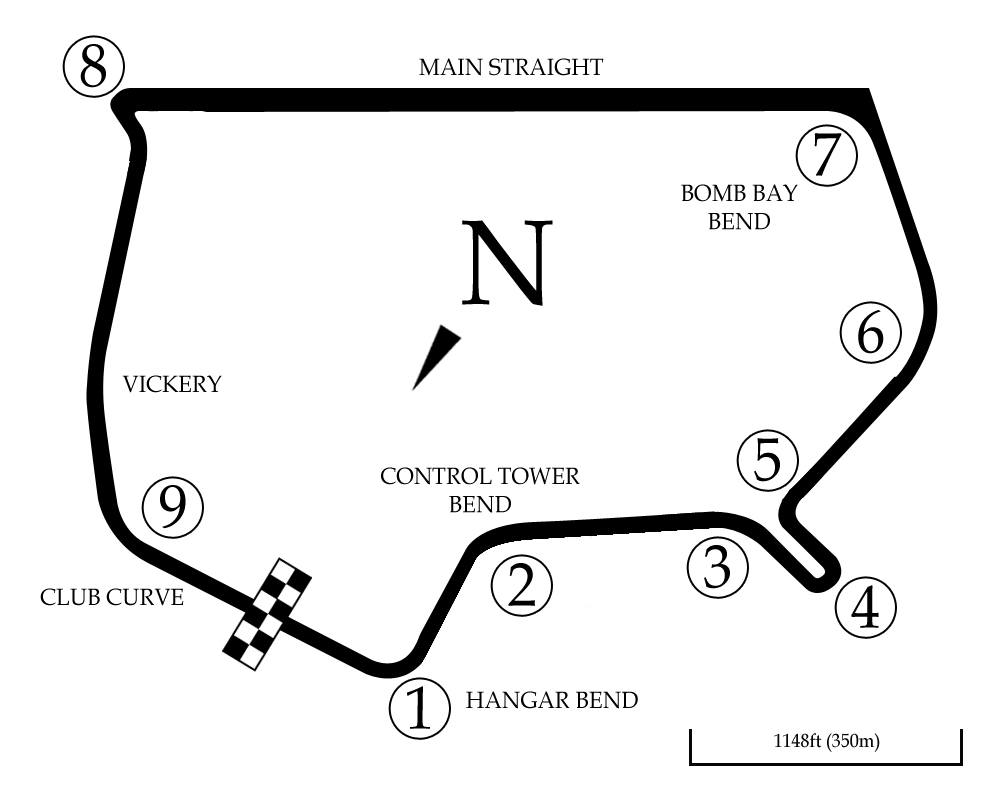

Race details
- Date: 23 January 1965
- Location: Wigram Airfield Circuit, Christchurch, New Zealand
- Course: Temporary racing facility
- Course length: 3.731 km (2.318 miles)
- Distance: 44 laps, 164.14 km (101.99 miles)
- Weather: Friday: Light Rain / Overcast; Saturday: Fine

Pole position
Driver	(New Zealand) Bruce McLaren	Cooper T79
- Time: Determined by heats

Fastest lap
Driver	(New Zealand) Bruce McLaren	Cooper T79
- Time: 1:25.9

Podium
First	(United Kingdom) Jim Clark	Lotus 32B
Second	(New Zealand) Bruce McLaren	Cooper T79
Third	(New Zealand) Jim Palmer	Brabham BT7A

The 1965 Lady Wigram Trophy was a motor race held at the Wigram Airfield Circuit on 23 January 1965. It was the fourteenth Lady Wigram Trophy to be held and was won by Jim Clark driving the Lotus 32B in what was the fastest race in the history of the Lady Wigram Trophy.

== Report ==
Through light rain, the practice times on Friday morning were relatively slow, with Jim Clark setting the benchmark in the low 1:30's. However, in the qualifying trails later that day, conditions improved allowing for faster times. Clark posted the fastest lap of a 1:26.0, which was significantly faster than that of second-placed Jim Palmer who set a time of 1:28.6.

The qualifying process for the Trophy race was through two preliminary races, where the race times would determine the grid. In the first heat, Bruce McLaren took the win and subsequently pole position for the race with a race time of 16 minutes and 11.2 seconds. Clark won the second heat, with a time that put him in second place for the Trophy race.

Clark launched off the line, into what would be a demanding lead. On lap four, Rex Flowers retired from the race due to a burst oil pipe as well as a collapsed piston. It only took Clark six laps to begin lapping backmarkers and by this stage, his lead over McLaren was up to a comfortable five seconds. By lap 26, only four cars had not been lapped - Clark (the leader), McLaren, Gardner and Palmer. Phil Hill retired on that lap as a result of a broken half-shaft and by this stage, Abernethy was laps away from retiring himself due to persistent overheating issues with his Cooper. Two more drivers would fail to finish the race - Riley due to a broken universal and Lawrence after he ran out of fuel. Clark almost joined the casualty list after experiencing oil pressure problems laps away from the conclusion of the race. This meant that Clark had to lift and nurse the car home, allowing McLaren to claw back the gap. By this stage however, the gap was far too big. Clark took the win in dominant fashion, a much better result for Clark than his last Lady Wigram Trophy outing where he stalled the car after having spun off in the wet conditions.

== Classification ==
Pos	No.	Driver	Car	Laps	Time	Grid
1	1	(United Kingdom) Jim Clark	Lotus 32B-Climax	44	1hr 04min 19.3sec	3
2	47	(New Zealand) Bruce McLaren	Cooper T79-Climax	44	+ 10.2 s	1
3	41	(New Zealand) Jim Palmer	Brabham BT7A-Climax	44	+ 38.7 s	8
4	11	(Australia) Frank Gardner	Brabham BT11A-Climax	44	+ 51.7 s	2
5	24	(New Zealand) Kerry Grant	Brabham BT4-Climax	43	+ 1 Lap	4
6	12	(New Zealand) Roly Levis	Brabham BT6-Ford	42	+ 2 Laps	14
7	8	(New Zealand) Andy Buchanen	Brabham BT6-Ford	41	+ 3 Laps	5
8	9	(New Zealand) Bill Thomasen	Brabham BT4-Climax	40	+ 4 Laps	7
9	7	(New Zealand) Ken Sager	Brabham BT6-Ford	39	+ 5 Laps	16
10	49	(New Zealand) Peter Gillum	Cooper T65-Ford	35	+ 9 Laps	12
Ret	14	(New Zealand) Graeme Lawrence	Brabham BT6-Ford	39	Fuel	10
Ret	17	(New Zealand) John Riley	Lotus 18/21-Climax	38	Universal	9
Ret	4	(New Zealand) Bruce Abernethy	Cooper T66-Climax	30	Overheating	11
Ret	48	(United States) Phil Hill	Cooper T70-Climax	26	Half shaft	13
Ret	35	(New Zealand) Red Dawson	Cooper T53-Climax	6	Crown Wheel	6
Ret	25	(New Zealand) Rex Flowers	Lola T4-Climax	4	Engine	15

Sporting positions
Preceded by 1964 Lady Wigram Trophy	Lady Wigram Trophy; 1965	Succeeded by 1966 Lady Wigram Trophy
