= 1956 Lady Wigram Trophy =

1956 Lady Wigram Grand Prix
- 5th Lady Wigram Trophy
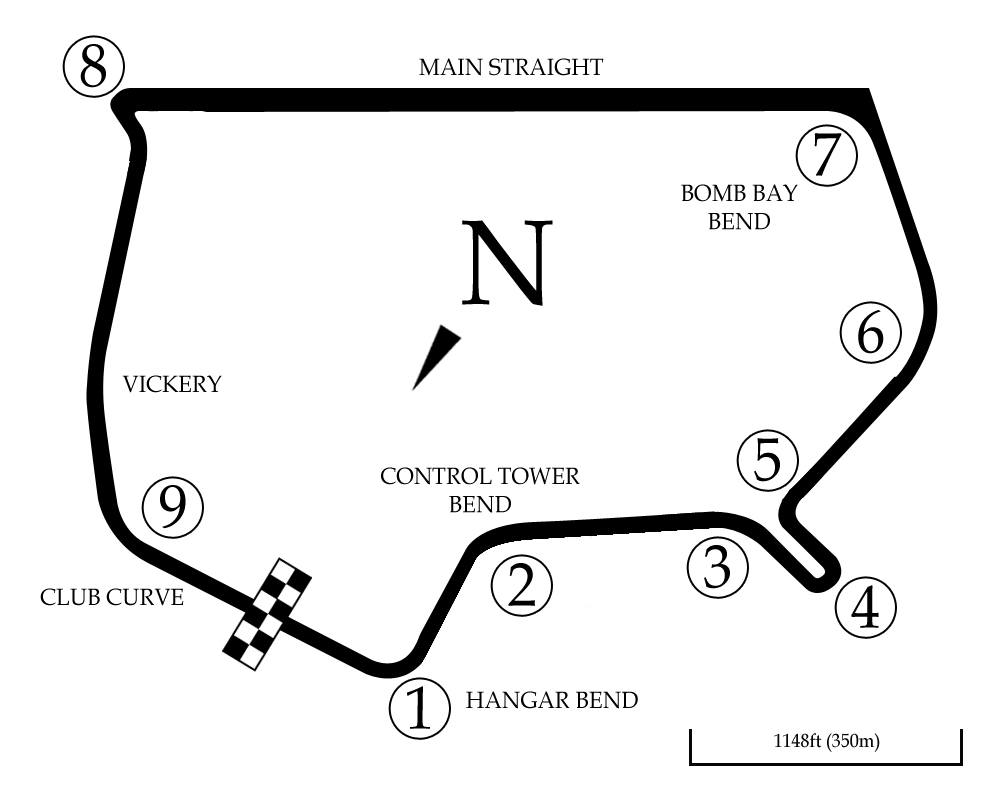

Race details
- Date: 21 January 1956
- Location: Wigram Airfield Circuit, Christchurch, New Zealand
- Course: Temporary racing facility
- Course length: 3.403 km (2.116 miles)
- Distance: 71 laps, 241.77 km (150.23 miles)
- Weather: Fine

Pole position
Driver	(United Kingdom) Peter Whitehead	Ferrari 500/750S
- Time: Determined by heats

Fastest lap
Driver	(United Kingdom) Peter Whitehead	Ferrari 500/750S
- Time: 1:29.5

Podium
First	(United Kingdom) Peter Whitehead	Ferrari 500/750S
Second	(Australia) Tony Gaze	Ferrari 500/750S
Third	(United Kingdom) Leslie Marr	Connaught B-Type

The 1956 Lady Wigram Trophy was a motor race held at the Wigram Airfield Circuit on 21 January 1956. It was the fifth Lady Wigram Trophy to be held and was won by Peter Whitehead in the Ferrari 500/750S. This was Whitehead's second Lady Wigram Trophy victory in succession and was another international podium lockout with Tony Gaze once again finishing second and Leslie Marr finishing third.

== Classification ==
Pos	No.	Driver	Car	Laps	Time	Grid
1		(United Kingdom) Peter Whitehead	Ferrari 500/750S / Ferrari 2968cc 4cyl	71	1hr 48min 00.3sec	1
2		(Australia) Tony Gaze	Ferrari 500/750S / Ferrari 2968cc 4cyl	71	+ 18.3 s	3
3		(United Kingdom) Leslie Marr	Connaught B-Type / Jaguar 3442cc 6cyl	71	+ 1:35.3 s	2
4		(United Kingdom) Reg Parnell	Aston Martin DB3R / Aston 2996cc 6cyl	71	+ 5:14.9 s	4
5		(New Zealand) Syd Jensen	Cooper Mk IX / Norton 530cc 1cyl	71	+ 5:51.4 s	5
6		(New Zealand) Frank Shuter	Cadillac Special / Cadillac 5200cc V8	71	+ 8:08.8 s	15
7		(New Zealand) Roy Roycroft	Bugatti-Jaguar / Jaguar 3442cc 6cyl	71	+ 9:05.2 s	6
8		(New Zealand) Ron Frost	Cooper Mk IX / Norton 530cc 1cyl	71	+ 10:27.9 s	7
9		(New Zealand) Ross Jensen	Austin-Healy 100S / Austin 2660cc 4cyl	71	+ 13:12.3 s	13
10		(New Zealand) Arthur Moffatt	Jaguar XK120 / Jaguar 3442cc 6cyl	68	+ 3 Laps	16
11		(New Zealand) Ray Archibald	Jaguar XK120 / Jaguar 3442cc 6cyl	68	+ 3 Laps	9
12		(New Zealand) Jim Boyd	Buckler Mk VI / Ford 1172cc 4cyl s/c	65	+ 6 Laps	14
Ret		(New Zealand) Tom Clark	Maserati 8CM / Maserati 2992cc 8cyl s/c		Engine	8
Ret		(Australia) David McKay	Aston Martin DB3S / Aston 2996cc 6cyl		Retired	10
Ret		(New Zealand) Pat Hoare	Maserati 4CLT-48 / Maserati 1498cc 4cyl s/c		Retired	11
Ret		(Australia) Tom Sulman	Aston Martin DB3S / Aston 2996cc 6cyl		Retired	12
Ret		(New Zealand) Arnold Stafford	Cooper Mk IX / Norton 530cc 1cyl		Retired	17
Ret		(New Zealand) Ray Drew	Cooper Mk IX / Norton 498cc 1cyl		Retired	18
Ret		(New Zealand) Allan Freeman	Talbot-Lago 26C / Talbot 4485cc 6cyl		Retired	19
Ret		(New Zealand) Wally Darrell	ACE II / Vanguard 2088cc 4cyl		Retired	20
Ret		(New Zealand) John McMillan	Alfa Romeo Tipo B / Alfa 2905cc 8cyl s/c		Retired	21
DNA		(New Zealand) Ronnie Moore	Cooper Mk V / Vincent 998cc V2		Did Not Attend	
DNA		(New Zealand) Les Moore	Kieft C50 / Vincent 998cc V2 s/c		Did Not Attend	
DNA		(New Zealand) John Horton	HWM / Alta 1960cc 4cyl s/c		Did Not Attend	
DNA		(New Zealand) Fred Zambucka	Maserati 8CLT-50 / Maserati 2984cc 8cyl s/c		Did Not Attend	
DNA		(New Zealand) George Smith	GeeCeeEss / Mercury 4071cc V8		Did Not Attend	

Sporting positions
Preceded by 1954 Lady Wigram Trophy	Lady Wigram Trophy; 1956	Succeeded by 1957 Lady Wigram Trophy
