= 1961 Lady Wigram Trophy =

1961 Lady Wigram Grand Prix
- 10th Lady Wigram Trophy
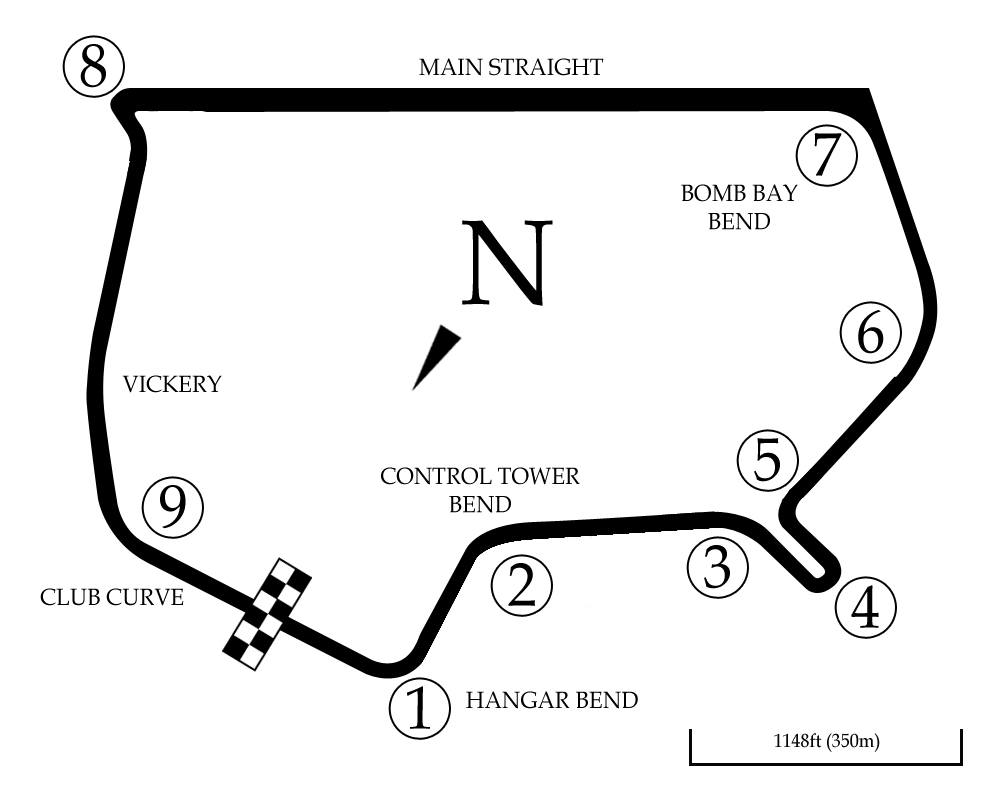

Race details
- Date: 21 January 1961
- Location: Wigram Airfield Circuit, Christchurch, New Zealand
- Course: Temporary racing facility
- Course length: 3.403 km (2.116 miles)
- Distance: 47 laps, 160.04 km (99.44 miles)
- Weather: Wet

Pole position
Driver	(United Kingdom) John Surtees	Lotus 18
- Time: Determined by heats

Fastest lap
Driver	(Australia) Jack Brabham	Cooper T53
- Time: 1:33.0

Podium
First	(Australia) Jack Brabham	Cooper T53
Second	(United Kingdom) Stirling Moss	Lotus 18
Third	(New Zealand) Angus Hyslop	Cooper T45

The 1961 Lady Wigram Trophy was a motor race held at the Wigram Airfield Circuit on 21 January 1961. It was the tenth Lady Wigram Trophy to be held and was won by Jack Brabham in the Cooper T53.

== Classification ==
Pos	No.	Driver	Car	Laps	Time	Grid
1		(Australia) Jack Brabham	Cooper T53 / Climax 2495cc 4cyl	47	1hr 17min 18.5sec	2
2		(United Kingdom) Stirling Moss	Lotus 18 / Climax 2495cc 4cyl	47	+ 48.5 s	5
3		(New Zealand) Angus Hyslop	Cooper T45 / Climax 1964cc 4cyl	47	+ 1:21.9 s	8
4		(New Zealand) Bruce McLaren	Cooper T53 / Climax 2495cc 4cyl	46	+ 1 Lap	6
5		(New Zealand) Denny Hulme	Cooper T51 / Climax 2495cc 4cyl	46	+ 1 Lap	9
6		(New Zealand) Len Gilbert	Maserati 250F / Maserati 2497cc 6cyl	44	+ 3 Laps	18
7		(New Zealand) Hec Green	RA / RA 2100cc 4cyl	44	+ 3 Laps	10
8		(New Zealand) Malcolm Gill	Lycoming Special / Lycoming 5239cc 4cyl	43	+ 4 Laps	7
9		(New Zealand) Duncan Mackenzie	Cooper T41 / Climax 1460cc 4cyl	43	+ 4 Laps	16
10		(New Zealand) Jim Boyd	HWM / Alta 1971cc 4cyl s/c	40	+ 7 Laps	18
11		(New Zealand) Roly Levis	Cooper T52 FJ / BMC 994cc 4cyl			19
12		(New Zealand) Brian Prescott	Maserati 250F / Maserati 2497cc 6cyl			15
Ret		(New Zealand) Frank Shuter	Ferrari 625 / Ferrari 2994cc 4cyl		Accident	13
Ret		(New Zealand) Jim Palmer	Lotus 18 FJ / Ford 994cc 4cyl		Retired	12
Ret		(United Kingdom) Jim Clark	Lotus 18 / Climax 2495cc 4cyl		Stall	4
Ret		(New Zealand) Pat Hoare	Ferrari 256 / Ferrari 2953cc V12		Retired	14
Ret		(Sweden) Jo Bonnier	Cooper T51 / Climax 2495cc 4cyl	18	Wishbone	3
Ret		(New Zealand) Tony Shelly	Cooper T45 / Climax 1964cc 4cyl		Retired	11
Ret		(United Kingdom) John Surtees	Lotus 18 / Climax 2495cc 4cyl		Retired	1
Ret		(United Kingdom) Roy Salvadori	Lotus 18 / Climax 2495cc 4cyl		Retired	20
DNS		(New Zealand) Bob Smith	Ferrari Super Squalo 555 / Ferrari 3431cc 4cyl		Did Not Start	
DNS		(New Zealand) Johnny Mansel	Tec Mec 1 / Chevrolet 4900cc V8		Did Not Start	
DNS		(New Zealand) Bob Eade	Maserati 250F / Maserati 2497cc 6cyl		Did Not Start	

Sporting positions
Preceded by 1960 Lady Wigram Trophy	Lady Wigram Trophy; 1961	Succeeded by 1962 Lady Wigram Trophy
