= 1953 Lady Wigram Trophy =

1953 Lady Wigram Grand Prix
- 3rd Lady Wigram Trophy
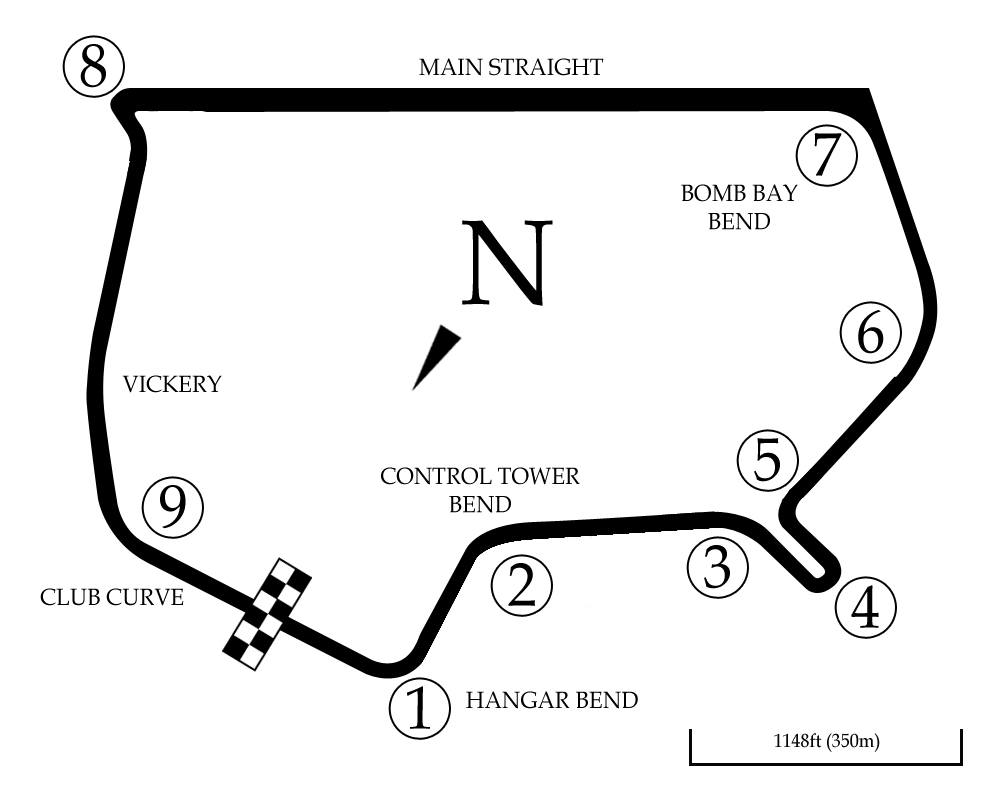

Race details
- Date: 28 February 1953
- Location: Wigram Airfield Circuit, Christchurch, New Zealand
- Course: Temporary racing facility
- Course length: 3.403 km (2.116 miles)
- Distance: 24 laps, 81.672 km (50.784 miles)
- Weather: Fine

Pole position
Driver	(New Zealand) Ron Roycroft	Alfa Romeo Tipo B
- Time: Determined by heats

Fastest lap
Driver	(New Zealand) Ron Roycroft	Alfa Romeo Tipo B
- Time: 1:34.0

Podium
First	(New Zealand) Ron Roycroft	Alfa Romeo Tipo B
Second	(New Zealand) George Smith	GeeCeeEss
Third	(New Zealand) Frank Shuter	Edelbrock Special

The 1953 Lady Wigram Trophy was a motor race held at the Wigram Airfield Circuit on 28 February 1953. It was the third Lady Wigram Trophy to be held and was won by Ron Roycroft in the Alfa Romeo Tipo B. This was the third straight win for the Tipo B car and Roycroft completed the weekend in dominant fashion achieving pole position and the fastest lap as well as the race win.

== Classification ==
Pos	No.	Driver	Car	Laps	Time	Grid
1	19	(New Zealand) Ron Roycroft	Alfa Romeo Tipo B / Alfa 2905cc 8cyl s/c	24	38min 40.4sec	1
2	44	(New Zealand) George Smith	GeeCeeEss / Mercury 4766cc V8	24	+ 58.6 s	2
3	1	(New Zealand) Frank Shuter	Edelbrock Special / Ford 3992cc V8	24	+ 1:59.8 s	3
4		(New Zealand) Ernie Sprague	Tucker-Ford / Mercury 4009cc V8	24	+ 3:04.6 s	4
5	18	(New Zealand) Doug Haigh	Citroen Special / Citroen 1911cc 4cyl	24	+ 3:06.6 s	6
6	6	(New Zealand) Les Holden	Jaguar XK120 / Jaguar 3442cc 6cyl	24	+ 4:20.6 s	8
7		(New Zealand) Harold O'Neill	Chevrolet Special / Chevrolet 3885c 6cyl			10
8	16	(New Zealand) Hec McLean	Cooper Mk II / JAP 1098cc V2			14
9		(New Zealand) Bill Crosbie	A40 Special / Austin 1200cc 4cyl			9
10	15	(New Zealand) Frank Pope	Ford 10 Special / Ford 1168cc 4cyl			16
11	23	(New Zealand) Max Winterbourn	MG TC / MG 1250cc 4cyl			11
12	13	(New Zealand) Wally Darrell	Vauxhall Special / Vauxhall 1300cc 4cyl			12
13		(New Zealand) Ron Paterson	Singer Special / Singer 972cc 4cyl s/c			15
Ret		(New Zealand) Halsey Logan	HRG / Singer 1496cc 4cyl s/c	15	Crankshaft	7
Ret	21	(New Zealand) Bob Gibbons	Cooper Mk V / JAP 1098cc V2	13	Engine	18
Ret	12	(New Zealand) Hec Green	RA Vanguard / Vanguard 2088cc 4cyl s/c	12	Engine	17
Ret	2	(New Zealand) Don Ransley	Ransley-Riley / Riley 2443cc 6cyl	5	Retired	13
Ret	7	(New Zealand) Pat Hoare	RA Vauxhall / Vauxhall 1442cc 4cyl s/c	3	Engine	5
DNS	3	(New Zealand) Des Wild	Alta / Alta 1961cc 4cyl		Did Not Start	
DNS		(New Zealand) John Jacobsen	V8 Special / Mercury 4013cc V8		Did Not Start	
DNS		(New Zealand) Vic Shuter	McMillan Special / Ford 3992cc V8		Did Not Start	
DNS		(New Zealand) Les Moore	Kieft C50 / Vincent 998cc V2 s/c		Did Not Start	
DNS		(New Zealand) Arnold Stafford	JBS-Norton / Norton 498cc 1cyl		Did Not Start	

Sporting positions
Preceded by 1952 Lady Wigram Trophy	Lady Wigram Trophy; 1953	Succeeded by 1954 Lady Wigram Trophy
