= 1954 Lady Wigram Trophy =

1954 Lady Wigram Grand Prix
- 4th Lady Wigram Trophy
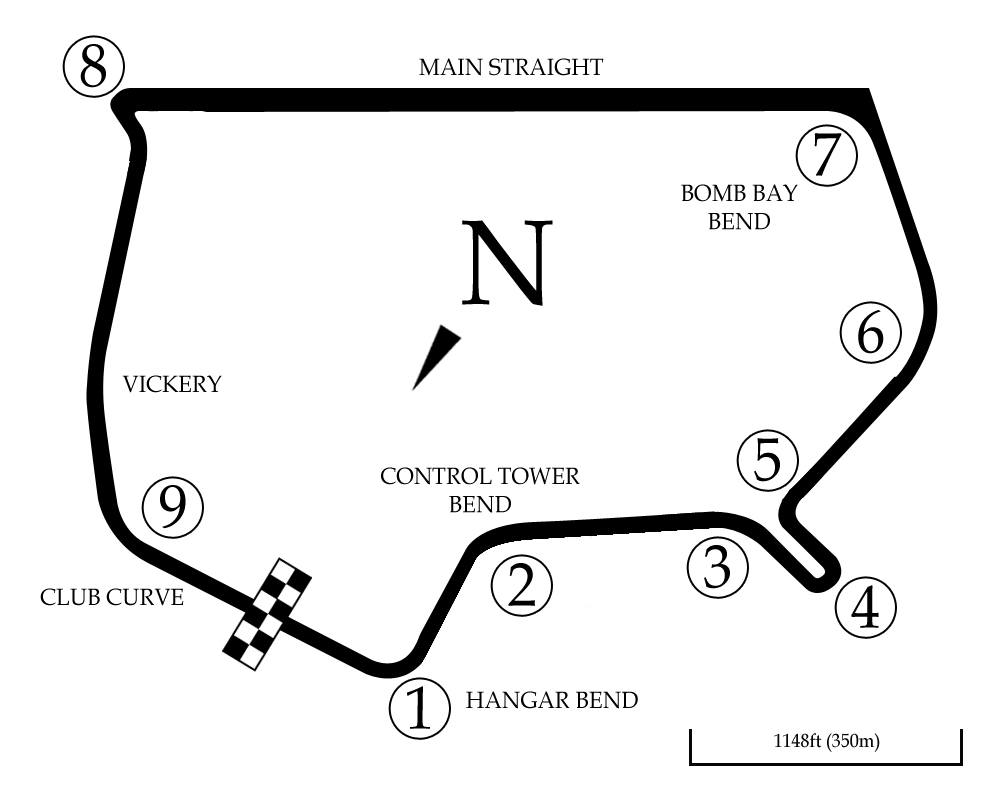

Race details
- Date: 6 February 1954
- Location: Wigram Airfield Circuit, Christchurch, New Zealand
- Course: Temporary racing facility
- Course length: 3.403 km (2.116 miles)
- Distance: 24 laps, 163.344 km (101.568 miles)
- Weather: Fine

Pole position
Driver	(United Kingdom) Ken Wharton	BRM P15
- Time: Determined by heats

Fastest lap
Driver	(United Kingdom) Ken Wharton	BRM P15
- Time: 1:23.5

Podium
First	(United Kingdom) Peter Whitehead	Ferrari 125
Second	(Australia) Tony Gaze	HWM
Third	(United Kingdom) Ken Wharton	BRM P15

The 1954 Lady Wigram Trophy was a motor race held at the Wigram Airfield Circuit on 6 February 1954. It was the third Lady Wigram Trophy to be held and was won by Peter Whitehead in the Ferrari 125, thereby becoming the first international driver to win the Lady Wigram Trophy.

== Classification ==
Pos	No.	Driver	Car	Laps	Time	Grid
1		(United Kingdom) Peter Whitehead	Ferrari 125 / Ferrari 1995cc V12 s/c	48	1hr 09min 51.3sec	2
2		(Australia) Tony Gaze	HWM / Alta 1972cc 4cyl	48	+ 31.0 s	3
3		(United Kingdom) Ken Wharton	BRM P15 / BRM 1496cc V16 s/c	48	+ 6:28.2 s	1
4		(New Zealand) John McMillan	Alfa Romeo Tipo B / Alfa 2905cc 8cyl s/c	48	+ 7:08.1 s	10
5		(New Zealand) Arnold Stafford	Cooper Mk VII / Norton 498cc 1cyl	48	+ 7:08.7 s	8
6		(New Zealand) Ray Archibald	Jaguar XK120 / Jaguar 3442cc 6cyl	48	+ 8:28.2 s	6
7		(New Zealand) Allan Freeman	Cooper Mk VII / Norton 498cc 1cyl	46	+ 2 Laps	9
8		(New Zealand) John Horton	MG TD / MG 1250cc 4cyl s/c	45	+ 3 Laps	13
9		(New Zealand) Wally Darrell	ACE Special / Vauxhall 1300cc 4cyl	43	+ 5 Laps	16
10		(New Zealand) Halsey Logan	HRG / Singer 1496cc 4cyl s/c	41	+ 7 Laps	12
11		(New Zealand) Arthur Kennard	Fiat Special / Fiat 1094cc 4cyl	35	+ 13 Laps	17
Ret	11	(New Zealand) Hec Green	RA / RA 2100cc 4cyl s/c	42	Engine	7
Ret		(New Zealand) Peter Ward	JBS / Norton 498cc 1cyl	47	Engine	15
Ret		(New Zealand) Morrie Stanton	Stanton Special / DeHavilland 6124cc 4cyl	32	Gear Lever	5
Ret		(New Zealand) Ross Jensen	Austin-Healey 100 / Austin 2660cc 4cyl	14	Rocker Arm	14
Ret		(New Zealand) Frank Shuter	Edelbrock Special / Ford 3992cc V8	7	Retired	11
Ret		(New Zealand) Fred Zambucka	Maserati 8CM / Maserati 2992cc 8cyl s/c	5	Oil Leak	4
Ret		(New Zealand) Ron Roycroft	Alfa Romeo Tipo B / Alfa 2905cc 8cyl s/c	2	Engine	19
Ret		(New Zealand) Ronnie Moore	Kieft C50 / Vincent 998cc V2 s/c	1	Clutch	18
DNS		(New Zealand) Don Ransley	Ransley-Riley / Riley 2443cc 6cyl s/c		Did Not Start	
DNA		(New Zealand) Syd Jensen	JBS / JAP 1098cc V2		Did Not Attend	
DNA		(New Zealand) Max Winterbourn	RA Vauxhall / Vauxhall 1442cc 4cyl s/c		Did Not Attend	
DNA		(New Zealand) Hec McLean	SH Special / RA 2088cc 4cyl s/c		Did Not Attend	

Sporting positions
Preceded by 1953 Lady Wigram Trophy	Lady Wigram Trophy; 1954	Succeeded by 1956 Lady Wigram Trophy
