= 1963 Lady Wigram Trophy =

1963 Lady Wigram Grand Prix
- 12th Lady Wigram Trophy
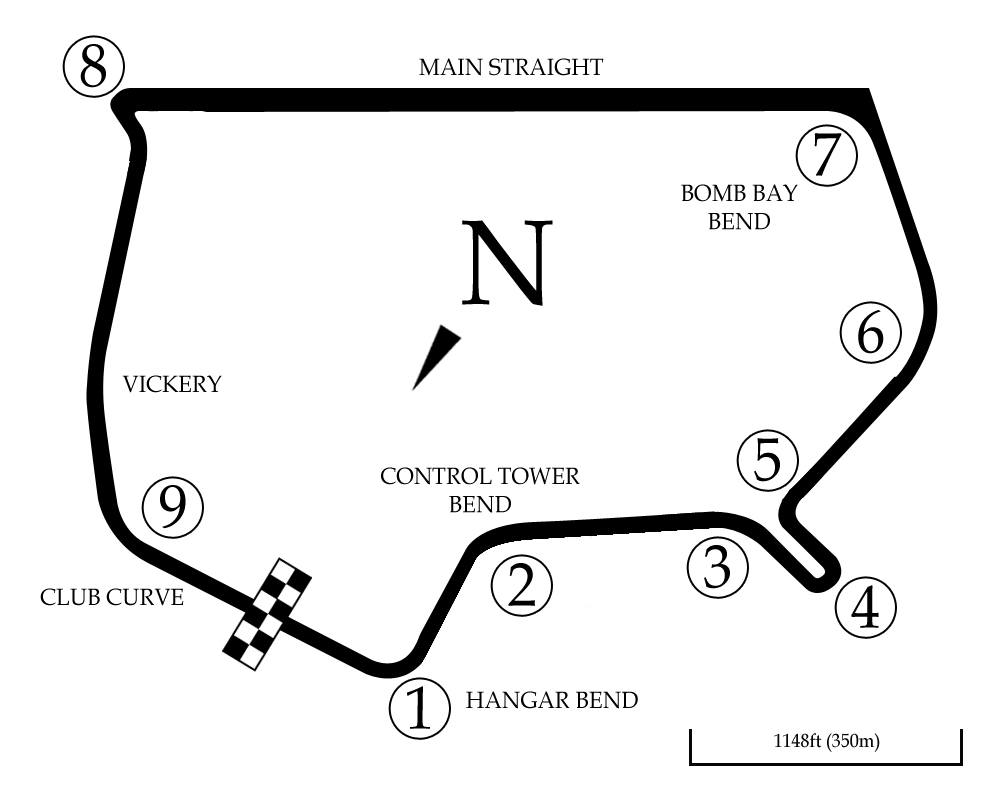

Race details
- Date: 19 January 1963
- Location: Wigram Airfield Circuit, Christchurch, New Zealand
- Course: Temporary racing facility
- Course length: 3.403 km (2.116 miles)
- Distance: 71 laps, 241.77 km (150.23 miles)
- Weather: Fine

Pole position
Driver	(Australia) Jack Brabham	Brabham BT4
- Time: Determined by heats

Fastest lap
Driver	(Australia) Jack Brabham	Brabham BT4
- Time: 1:18.4

Podium
First	(New Zealand) Bruce McLaren	Cooper T62
Second	(Australia) Jack Brabham	Brabham BT4
Third	(South Africa) Tony Maggs	Lola T4

The 1963 Lady Wigram Trophy was a motor race held at the Wigram Airfield Circuit on 19 January 1963. It was the twelfth Lady Wigram Trophy to be held and was won by Bruce McLaren in the Cooper T62. McLaren became the first New Zealander since Ron Roycroft to win the Lady Wigram Trophy.

== Classification ==
Pos	No.	Driver	Car	Laps	Time	Grid
1		(New Zealand) Bruce McLaren	Cooper T62 / Climax 2750cc 4cyl	71	1hr 36min 04.7sec	3
2		(Australia) Jack Brabham	Brabham BT4 / Climax 2750cc 4cyl	71	+ 30.3 s	1
3		(South Africa) Tony Maggs	Lola T4 / Climax 2750cc 4cyl	70	+ 1 Lap	4
4		(New Zealand) Angus Hyslop	Cooper T53 / Climax 2495cc 4cyl	70	+ 1 Lap	5
5		(New Zealand) John Histed	Lola Mk2 / Ford 1340cc 4cyl	64	+ 7 Laps	13
6		(New Zealand) Ian Green	Cooper T45 / Climax 1964cc 4cyl	62	+ 9 Laps	15
7		(New Zealand) Ken Sager	Lotus 20 / Ford 1475cc 4cyl			16
8		(New Zealand) Rex Flowers	Gemini Mk Illa FJ / Ford 1340cc 4cyl			11
9		(New Zealand) Roly Levis	Cooper T52 / Ford 1475cc 4cyl			17
Ret		(United Kingdom) John Surtees	Lola T4 / Climax 2750cc 4cyl	33	Gearbox	2
Ret		(Australia) Frank Turpie	Lotus 20 / Ford 1475cc 4cyl	31	Retired	14
Ret		(New Zealand) Chris Amon	Cooper T53 / Climax 2495cc 4cyl	29	Gearbox	6
Ret		(United Kingdom) Innes Ireland	Ferguson P99 / Climax 2495cc 4cyl		Overheating	18
Ret		(New Zealand) David Young	Cooper T65 / Ford 1473cc 4cyl		Retired	8
Ret		(New Zealand) Bill Thomasen	Cooper T51 / Climax 1964cc 4cyl		Retired	12
Ret		(New Zealand) Tony Shelly	Lotus 18/21 / Climax 2750cc 4cyl	13	Gearbox	9
Ret		(New Zealand) Jim Palmer	Lotus 20B / Ford 1481cc 4cyl	0	Accident	7
Ret		(New Zealand) Lionel Bulcraig	Aston Martin DBR4-300 / Aston 2991cc 6cyl	0	Accident	10

Sporting positions
Preceded by 1962 Lady Wigram Trophy	Lady Wigram Trophy; 1963	Succeeded by 1964 Lady Wigram Trophy
