= 1976 Lady Wigram Trophy =

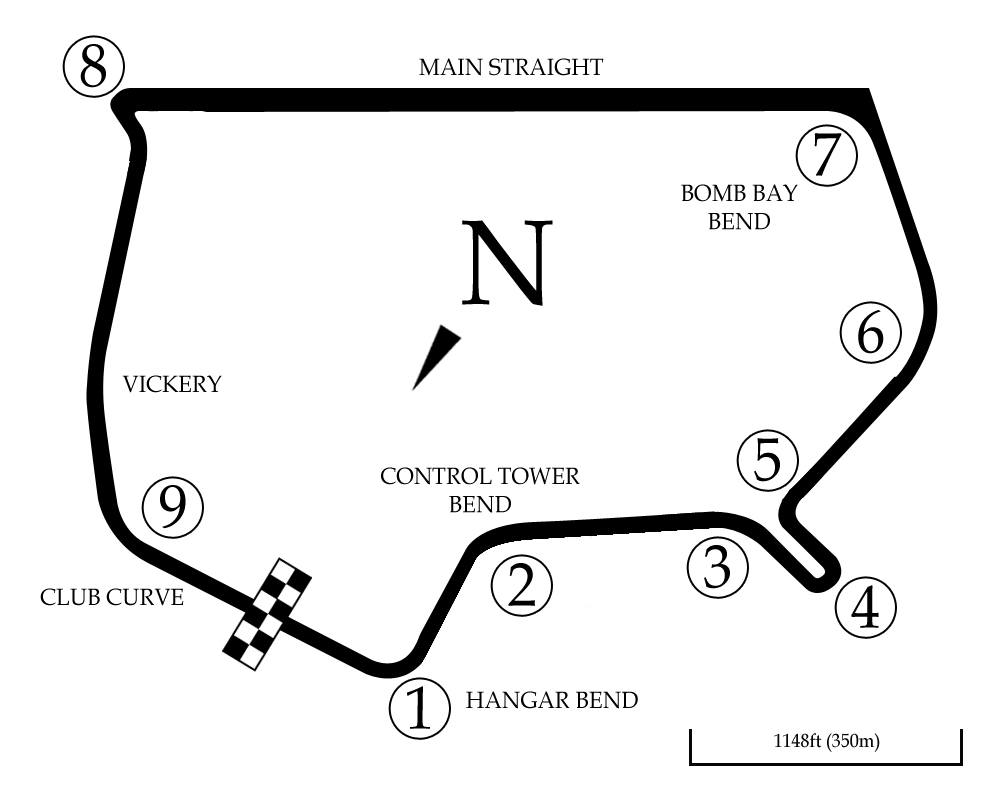
Layout of the Wigram Airfield Circuit

The 1976 Lady Wigram Trophy was contested as part of the Peter Stuyvesant Series on 18 January 1976. The winner was New Zealander Ken Smith.

== Results ==
Pos	No.	Driver	Constructor	Sponsor	Laps	Time/Retired	MPH
1	11	(New Zealand) Ken Smith	Lola - Chevrolet	La Valise Travel	44	51min 53.9sec	111.91
2	19	(New Zealand) Jim Murdoch	Begg - Chevrolet	Begg & Allen Ltd	43		
3	2	(Australia) Paul Bernasconi	Lola - Chevrolet	Sharp Calculators	43		
4	62	(Australia) Bruce Allison	Lola - Chevrolet	Hobby & Toyland Racing	43		
5	4	(Australia) John Edmonds	Elfin Sports Cars - Holden		40		
6	12	(New Zealand) Baron Robertson	Elfin Sports Cars - Holden	Robertson Racing	29		
7	17	(New Zealand) Gary Love	Begg - Chevrolet		14		
Ret	1	(United Kingdom) Brian Redman	Chevron Cars Ltd - BMW	Fred Opert Racing	5	Engine	
Ret	5	(Australia) Kevin Bartlett	Lola - Chevrolet		3	Oil Pump	
Ret	6	(Australia) Max Stewart	Lola - Chevrolet	Sharp Calculators	3	Oil Pump	
Ret	67	(New Zealand) Graham Baker	Begg - Chevrolet	Automotive Maintenance	3	Piston	

== Qualifying ==
1. Ken Smith (F5000), 1'07.5
2. Max Stewart (F5000), 1'07.8
3. Kevin Bartlett (F5000), 1'09.8
4. Graeme Lawrence (F5000), 1'10.3
5. Jim Murdoch (F5000), 1'10.4
6. Brian Redman (F2), 1'10.6
7. Bruce Allison (F5000), 1'11.2
8. Paul Bernasconi (F5000), 1'11.2
9. John Edmonds (F5000), 1'15.5
10. Baron Robertson (F5000), 1'15.8
11. Graham Baker (F5000), 1'17.6
12. Gary Love (F5000), 1'22.3
13. Neil Doyle (F5000), No Time
14. Robbie Booth (F5000), No Time
