= Frank Shuter =

Frank Shuter may refer to:

- Frank Shuter (speedway rider) (1943–1997), motorcycle speedway rider from New Zealand
- Frank Shuter (racing driver) (1918–1969), his father, New Zealand racing driver
