= 1960 Lady Wigram Trophy =

1960 Lady Wigram Grand Prix
- 9th Lady Wigram Trophy
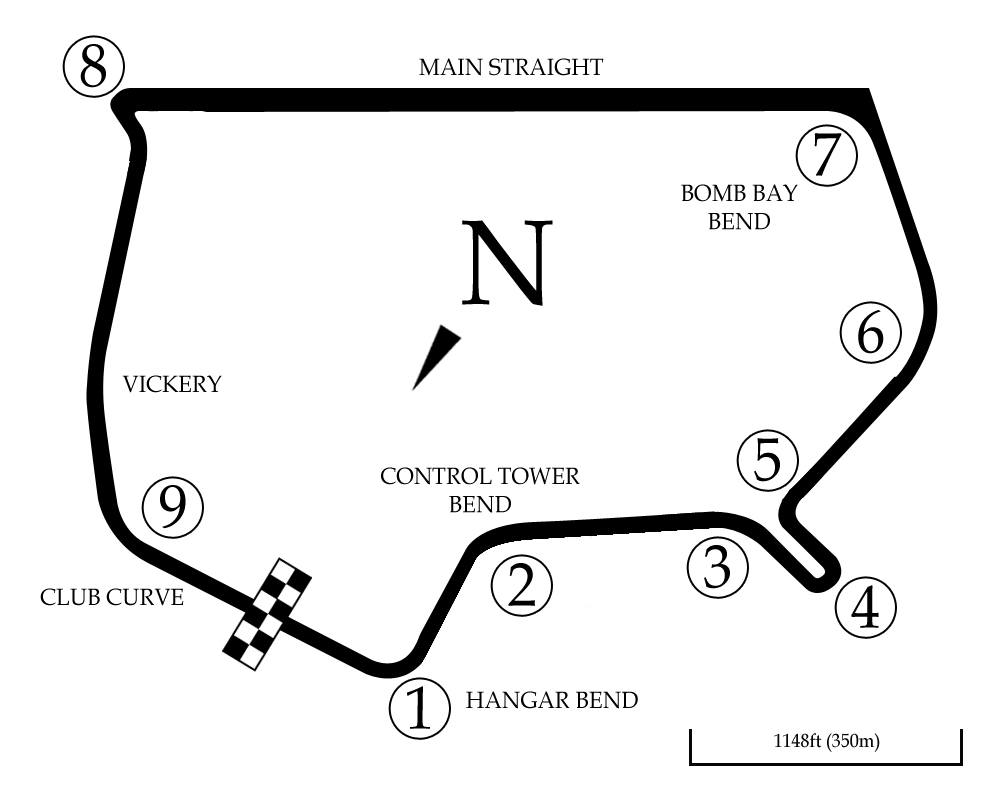

Race details
- Date: 23 January 1960
- Location: Wigram Airfield Circuit, Christchurch, New Zealand
- Course: Temporary racing facility
- Course length: 3.403 km (2.116 miles)
- Distance: 71 laps, 241.77 km (150.23 miles)
- Weather: Fine

Pole position
Driver	(Australia) Jack Brabham	Cooper T51
- Time: Determined by heats

Fastest lap
Driver	(Australia) Jack Brabham	Cooper T51
- Time: 1:20.8

Podium
First	(Australia) Jack Brabham	Cooper T52
Second	(United Kingdom) David Piper	Lotus 16
Third	(United Kingdom) Ian Burgess	Cooper T51

The 1960 Lady Wigram Trophy was a motor race held at the Wigram Airfield Circuit on 23 January 1960. It was the ninth Lady Wigram Trophy to be held and was won by Jack Brabham in the Cooper T51.

== Classification ==
Pos	No.	Driver	Car	Laps	Time	Grid
1		(Australia) Jack Brabham	Cooper T51 / Climax 2495cc 4cyl	71	1hr 40min 42.0sec	1
2		(United Kingdom) David Piper	Lotus 16 / Climax 2495cc 4cyl	71	+ 9.8 s	3
3		(United Kingdom) Ian Burgess	Cooper T51 / Climax 2205cc 4cyl	71	+ 2:01.0 s	2
4		(New Zealand) Bruce McLaren	Lycoming Special / Lycoming 4733cc 4cyl	71	+ 3:18.4 s	17
5		(New Zealand) Pat Hoare	Ferrari 256 / Ferrari 2996cc 4cyl	71	+ 4:17.9 s	4
6		(New Zealand) Jim Palmer	Lotus 15 / Climax 1964cc 4cyl	68	+ 3 Laps	6
7		(New Zealand) Len Gilbert	Cooper-Bristol Mk II / Bristol 1971cc 6cyl	67	+ 4 Laps	7
8		(New Zealand) Syd Jensen	Cooper T45 / Climax 1460cc 4cyl	66	+ 5 Laps	9
9		(New Zealand) Bill Thomasen	Ferrari 750 Monza / Ferrari 2999cc 4cyl	65	+ 6 Laps	15
10		(New Zealand) Ron Roycroft	Ferrari 375 / Ferrari 4493cc V12	64	+ 7 Laps	11
11		(New Zealand) Bruce Webster	Cooper Mk VII / Porsche 1582cc 4cyl	64	+ 7 Laps	12
Ret		(New Zealand) Denny Hulme	Cooper T45 / Climax 1964cc 4cyl	68	Oil Pressure	10
Ret		(New Zealand) Morrie Stanton	Stanton-Corvette / Chevrolet 4640cc V8	56	Spun off	14
Ret		(New Zealand) Les Moore	RA Vanguard / Vanguard 2088cc 4cyl	8	Tyre	15
Ret		(New Zealand) Gavin Quirk	Maserati 250F / Maserati 2497cc 6cyl	7	Engine	16
Ret		(New Zealand) Johnny Mansell	Maserati 250F / Maserati 2497cc 6cyl	0	Universal	16
DNS		(New Zealand) Malcolm Gill	Lycoming Special / Lycoming 4733cc 4cyl		Did Not Start	
DNS		(Australia) Len Lukey	Cooper T45 / Climax 1964cc 4cyl		Did Not Start	
DNA		(New Zealand) George Lawton	Cooper T45 / Climax 1964cc 4cyl		Did Not Attend	
DNA		(New Zealand) Allan Freeman	Talbot-Lago 26C / Talbot 4485cc 6cyl		Did Not Attend	
DNA		(New Zealand) Bob Smith	Ferrari Super Squalo 555 / Ferrari 3431cc 4cyl		Did Not Attend	

Sporting positions
Preceded by 1959 Lady Wigram Trophy	Lady Wigram Trophy; 1960	Succeeded by 1961 Lady Wigram Trophy
