= 1962 Lady Wigram Trophy =

1962 Lady Wigram Grand Prix
- 11th Lady Wigram Trophy
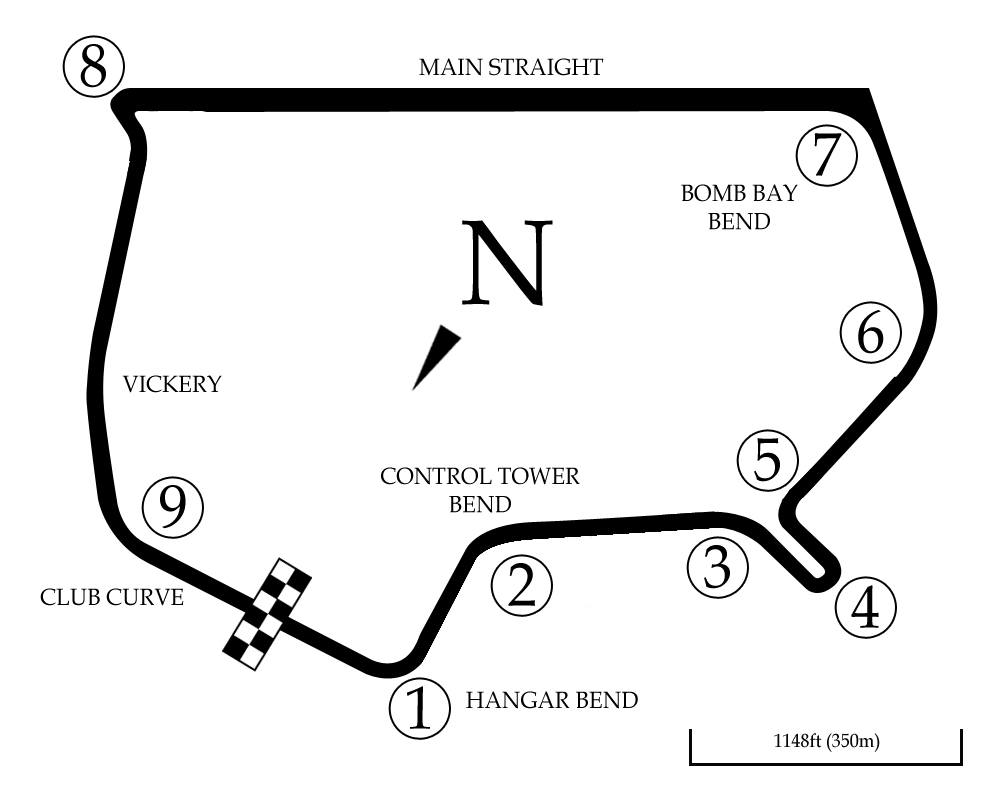

Race details
- Date: 20 January 1962
- Location: Wigram Airfield Circuit, Christchurch, New Zealand
- Course: Temporary racing facility
- Course length: 3.403 km (2.116 miles)
- Distance: 71 laps, 241.77 km (150.23 miles)

Pole position
| Driver | (New Zealand) Bruce McLaren | Cooper T53 |
- Time: Determined by heats

Podium
| First | (United Kingdom) Stirling Moss | Lotus 21 |
| Second | (Australia) Jack Brabham | Cooper T55 |
| Third | (United Kingdom) John Surtees | Cooper T53 |

The 1962 Lady Wigram Trophy was a motor race held at the Wigram Airfield Circuit on 20 January 1962. It was the eleventh Lady Wigram Trophy to be held and was won by Stirling Moss in the Lotus 21.

== Classification ==
| Pos | No. | Driver | Car | Laps | Time | Grid |
|---|---|---|---|---|---|---|
| 1 | | (United Kingdom) Stirling Moss | Lotus 21 / Climax 2495cc 4cyl | 71 | | 3 |
| 2 | | (Australia) Jack Brabham | Cooper T55 / Climax 2750cc 4cyl | 71 | | 2 |
| 3 | | (United Kingdom) John Surtees | Cooper T53 / Climax 2750cc 4cyl | 71 | | 4 |
| 4 | | (New Zealand) Bruce McLaren | Cooper T53 / Climax 2750cc 4cyl | 71 | | 1 |
| 5 | | (United Kingdom) Roy Salvadori | Cooper T53 / Climax 2596cc 4cyl | 71 | | 5 |
| 6 | | (New Zealand) Angus Hyslop | Cooper T53 / Climax 2495cc 4cyl | 69 | + 2 Laps | 9 |
| 7 | | (Australia) Arnold Glass | BRM P48 / BRM 2497cc 4cyl | 67 | + 4 Laps | 8 |
| 8 | | (New Zealand) Johnny Mansel | Cooper T51 / Maserati 2890cc 4cyl | 67 | + 4 Laps | 11 |
| 9 | | (New Zealand) Tony Shelly | Cooper T45 / Climax 1964cc 4cyl | | | 10 |
| 10 | | (New Zealand) Pat Hoare | Ferrari 256 / Ferrari 2953cc V12 | | | 12 |
| 11 | | (New Zealand) Chris Amon | Maserati 250F / Maserati 2495cc 6cyl | | | 13 |
| 12 | | (New Zealand) Bill Thomasen | Cooper T51 / Climax 1964cc 4cyl | | | 15 |
| 13 | | (New Zealand) John Histed | Lola Mk2 / Ford 998cc 4cyl | | | 16 |
| 14 | | (New Zealand) Bob Eade | Maserati 250F / Maserati 2497cc 6cyl | | | 18 |
| Ret | | (New Zealand) Ross Greenville | Lotus 18 FJ / Ford 998cc 4cyl | | Retired | 17 |
| Ret | | (United Kingdom) Ron Flockhart | Lotus 18 / Climax 2495cc 4cyl | 42 | Universal | 7 |
| Ret | | (New Zealand) Jim Palmer | Lotus 21 / Ford 1475cc 4cyl | 24 | Gearbox | 14 |
| Ret | | (Italy) Lorenzo Bandini | Cooper T53 / Maserati 2890cc 4cyl | 12 | Oil Leak | 6 |
| DNS | | (New Zealand) Hec Green | RA / RA 2100cc 4cyl s/c | | Did Not Start | |
| DNS | | (New Zealand) Forrest Cardon | Lycoming Special / Lycoming 5239cc 4cyl | | Did Not Start | |

Sporting positions
| Preceded by 1961 Lady Wigram Trophy | Lady Wigram Trophy; 1962 | Succeeded by 1963 Lady Wigram Trophy |
