= Diana Davison =

Australian racing driver

Diana Davison was one of the first lady racing car drivers in Australia. A trophy was named in her honour called the "Diana Davison/Gaze Trophy".

She acted as timekeeper for the Tasman Series. She Narrated part of The History of the Rob Roy Hillclimb DVD

She was awarded the Lex Davison Perpetual Trophy at Bathurst, however it was since lost. Davison sold ‘Little Alfa’ in 2008.

She was a witness of the Bluebird-Proteus CN7 land speed record.

She was the wife of Lex Davison and after being widowed, to Tony Gaze who was Australia's first Formula 1 driver. Her son Richard Davison was the winner of the 1980 Australian Formula 2 Championship and his brother Jon Davison was long time promoter for Sandown International Raceway. Her grand children Will Davison won two Bathurst 1000, the 2001 Australian Formula Ford Championship and was a Formula 1 test driver with Minardi and also competed in the Supercars Championship for two decades. Alex Davison has won numerous titles including the 2004 Australian Carrera Cup Championship as well as also competing in Supercars for several years. And James Davison has competed in the IndyCar Series, NASCAR and the Rolex Sports Car Series.
