= Tony Gaze =

Australian fighter pilot and racing driver (1920–2013)

Frederick Anthony Owen Gaze
- Born: 3 February 1920; Prahran, Victoria, Australia
- Died: 29 July 2013 (aged 93); Geelong, Victoria, Australia
- Spouse: Diana Davison
- Military career
- Allegiance: United Kingdom
- Branch: Royal Air Force
- Service years: 1940–1948
- Rank: Squadron Leader
- Nickname: Tony
- Units: No. 57 OTU; No. 616 Squadron RAF; No. 131 Squadron RAF; No. 66 Squadron RAF; No. 41 Squadron RAF
- Commands: No. 64 Squadron RAF; No. 610 Squadron RAF
- Conflicts: Second World War; Channel Front
- Awards: Distinguished Flying Cross & Two Bars; Medal of the Order of Australia
- Other work: Motor racing driver

Frederick Anthony Owen Gaze, DFC & Two Bars, OAM (3 February 1920 – 29 July 2013) was an Australian fighter pilot and racing driver. He flew with the Royal Air Force in the Second World War, was a flying ace credited with 12.5 confirmed victories (11 and 3 shared), and later enjoyed a successful racing career in the UK, Europe and Australia. He was the first ever Australian to take part in a Formula One Grand Prix.

== Early life ==
Gaze was born in Melbourne, Victoria, on 20 February 1920, the son of Irvine Gaze, a member of the Ross Sea Party who were preparing for Ernest Shackleton's expedition. He was educated at Geelong Grammar School, and when war was declared in September 1939 he was a student at Queens' College, Cambridge.

== Military service ==
=== First success ===
Gaze joined the RAF in 1940, and on completion of training and with 122 hours flying time recorded was posted to No. 610 Squadron RAF at RAF Westhampnett in March 1941, flying cross-channel fighter sweeps. Gaze's first 'kill' came on 26 June when he downed a Messerschmitt Bf 109. The next month he claimed two further victories, one half and two probables. For these victories he was awarded the first of three DFCs. His brother, Pilot Officer Scott Gaze had joined No. 610 Squadron RAF with him in early 1941, but was killed in action on 23 March 1941. In November 1941 Gaze was posted to No. 57 OTU as an instructor.

Gaze started his second tour in June 1942, with No. 616 Squadron RAF, flying the high altitude Spitfire Mk.VI. During the ill-fated Dieppe Raid on 19 August 1942, he received his second DFC after destroying an enemy fighter. In late August 1942, he was posted to command No. 64 Squadron RAF flying the new Spitfire IX.

=== Demotion and escape after being shot down ===
On 26 September 1942, Gaze led a wing of Spitfires in support of a bombing raid at Morlaix. An Eagle Squadron, No. 133 Squadron RAF, became scattered in high winds and lost 11 of 12 fighters. Gaze was made the scapegoat for the mission failure and was transferred back to No. 616 Squadron as a flight commander. It was later determined that the causes of the high losses on that mission were pilot inexperience and unexpected adverse weather.

After a rest from operations in early 1943, Gaze was again posted to an operational Squadron in August 1943, No. 66 Squadron RAF at RAF Kenley. On 4 September 1943 over Le Tréport after downing a Focke-Wulf Fw 190 Gaze's own Spitfire V was shot down by Heinz-Gerhard Vogt of II./JG 26 (his 14th claim of an eventual 48). Gaze crash landed 20 miles from Dieppe with slight injuries, evaded capture and made his way, with help from the French Resistance, to neutral Spain.

=== Back to Britain ===
In February 1944, Gaze joined the Air Fighting Development Unit (ADFU) at Wittering, rejoining No. 610 Squadron on the continent in July 1944. He claimed a Messerschmitt Me 262 jet shot down near Emmrich on Rhine on 14 February 1945 (a Me 262A-2 of I./KG 51 flown by Rudolf Hoffmann) (the first Australian to achieve this feat) and shared an Arado Ar 234 jet bomber on 12 April 1945.

The Me 262 victory resulted in Gaze being awarded the Distinguished Flying Cross for the third time; one of only 47 men in the Second World War.

After a month with No. 41 Squadron RAF in April, on 2 May 1945, Gaze was posted as a flight commander to No. 616 squadron, becoming one of the first Australians (after F/O JN McKay, RAAF) to fly the Gloster Meteor in combat during the closing stages of the war.

During the war, Gaze had also flown with some of the most famous names including Wing Commander Douglas Bader, top Allied ace Johnnie Johnson (38 victories) as part of the RAF's Tangmere Wing and Paul Tibbets, pilot of the 'Enola Gay', B29 Bomber that dropped the atomic bomb on Hiroshima.

== List of air victories ==
Gaze ended the war as Australia's tenth ranking highest ace, claiming 12.5 confirmed destroyed (11 and 3 shared (note: below list includes the destruction of a V1)), 4 probables, and 5 damaged in 488 combat missions, all while flying Supermarine Spitfires of various Marks.

Victory No.	Date	Squadron	Enemy aircraft	Notes
1.	26 June 1941	No. 610 Squadron	Messerschmitt Me 109E	Gravelines
Probable	26 June 1941	No. 610 Squadron	Messerschmitt Bf 109	Gravelines
Damaged	2 July 1941	No. 610 Squadron	Messerschmitt Bf 109	Lille
1.5	6 July 1941	No. 610 Squadron	Messerschmitt Bf 109 shared	Lille
2.5	10 July 1941	No. 610 Squadron	Messerschmitt Bf 109	Hardelot
3.5	10 July 1941	No. 610 Squadron	Messerschmitt Bf 109	Hardelot
Probable	17 July 1941	No. 610 Squadron	Messerschmitt Bf 109	Le Touquet
Probable	13 July 1942	No. 616 Squadron	Messerschmitt Bf 109	Abbéville
4.5	18 July 1942	No. 616 Squadron	Focke-Wullf Fw 190	Le Touquet
Probable	18 July 1942	No. 616 Squadron	Focke-Wullf Fw 190	Le Touquet
5.5	19 August 1942	No. 616 Squadron	Dornier Do 217	Dieppe
Damaged	6 September 1942	No. 616 Squadron	Focke-Wulff Fw 190	St. Omer
Damaged	11 October 1942	No. 64 Squadron	Focke-Wulf Fw 190	Dunkirk
Damaged	16 August 1943	No. 129 Squadron	Focke-Wulf Fw 190	Eeckloo
6.5	17 August 1943	No. 129 Squadron	Focke-Wulf Fw 190	Antwerp
Probable	19 August 1943	No. 129 Squadron	Messerschmitt Me 109G	
7.5	4 September 1943	No. 66 Squadron	Focke-Wulf Fw 190	Beauchamps
8.5	5 August 1944	No. 610 Squadron	V-1	Beachy Head, East Sussex, UK
9.5	January 1945	No. 610 Squadron	Focke-Wulff Fw 190D	On the ground
10.5	14 February 1945	No. 610 Squadron	Messerschmitt Me 262	Emmrich on Rhine
11.5	10 April 1945	No. 41 Squadron	Junkers Ju 52/3m	Bremen-Nieuberg
12	12 April 1945	No. 41 Squadron	Arado Ar 234 shared	Bremen
12.5	28 April 1945	No. 41 Squadron	Focke-Wulff Fw 190D shared	Schwerin airfield
13.5	30 April 1945	No. 41 Squadron	Focke-Wulff Fw 190D	Elbe Bridgehead

== Racing driver ==
Tony Gaze
Formula One World Championship career
- Active years: 1952
- Team: Privateer HWM
- Entries: 4 (3 starts)
- Championships: 0
- Wins: 0
- Podiums: 0
- Career points: 0
- Pole positions: 0
- Fastest laps: 0
- First entry: 1952 Belgian Grand Prix
- Last entry: 1952 Italian Grand Prix
24 Hours of Le Mans career
- Years: 1956
- Teams: Automobiles Frazer Nash Ltd.
- Best finish: DNF (1956)
- Class wins: 0

In 1946, Gaze suggested to the Duke of Richmond and Gordon, better known as "Freddie March", that the roads around RAF Westhampnett would be a good location for a racing track. Acting on this suggestion, March opened the Goodwood Circuit in 1948.

Gaze returned to Australia after the war, and began racing an Alta racing car that he brought with him.

Gaze raced an Alta Formula 2 in Europe for the 1951 season, switching to an HWM-Alta for the following season, planning to racing again in F2. When the sport's governing body decided to change the World Championship regulations from Formula One to Formula 2, Gaze's plans changed as well. He took part in a number of non-championship F1 events, and then in June travelled to the Circuit de Spa-Francorchamps for the Grote Prijs van Belgie. After qualifying the HWM-Alta 16th, he raced one place better, attaining 15th place. By racing in Spa, Gaze became the first Australian to contest a World Championship motor race. This was followed by appearances in the RAC British Grand Prix and the Großer Preis von Deutschland, although he failed to qualify for the Gran Premio d’Italia.

The following year, Gaze was a member of the first Australian crew to attempt the Rallye Monte Carlo in a Holden FX with Lex Davison and Stan Jones. At one point, the trio was in the top ten, but finished the event in 64th. Also that season, he raced an Aston Martin DB3 in sports car events across Europe, and survived an accident in the Grande Prémio de Portugal, when his car struck a tree after a collision with a Ferrari. He was thrown clear as the Aston flipped over and burst into flames. Gaze was carried to safety by spectators, and suffered only cuts and bruises.

In 1954 and 1955, Gaze raced the ex-Ascari Ferrari 500 F2 in non-championship events in Europe, Australia and New Zealand. On his return to England, he set up the Kangaroo Stable, the first Australian international racing team. One team member was a young Jack Brabham. They ran Aston Martin DB3S. However, many races were cancelled after the Le Mans disaster, and the Stable disbanded at the end of the season. Gaze continued to race for another season.

== Racing record ==
=== Career highlights ===
Season	Series	Position	Team	Car
1954	Lady Wigram Trophy	2nd		HWM-Alta
	New Zealand Grand Prix	3rd		HWM-Alta
1955	Les 12 Heures d’Hyères	2nd	Kangaroo Stable	Aston Martin DB3S
	New Zealand Grand Prix	3rd		Ferrari 500/625
1956	Dunedin Road Race	1st		Ferrari 500/750S
	Moomba TT	1st	FAO Gaze	HWM-Jaguar
	New Zealand Grand Prix	2nd		Ferrari 500/750S
	Lady Wigram Trophy	2nd		Ferrari 500/750S
	Southland Road Race	2nd		Ferrari 500/750S
	Ardmore Grand Prix	3rd		HWM-Jaguar
	Argus Cup	3rd		HWM-Jaguar

=== Complete Formula One World Championship results ===
(key)

Year	Entrant	Chassis	Engine	1	2	3	4	5	6	7	8	WDC	Points
1952	Tony Gaze	HWM	Alta Straight-4	SUI	500	BEL; 15	FRA	GBR; Ret	GER; Ret	NED	ITA; DNQ	NC	0

=== Complete 24 Hours of Le Mans results ===
Year	Team	Co-drivers	Car	Class	Laps	Pos.	Class pos.
1956	(United Kingdom) Automobiles Frazer Nash Ltd.	(United Kingdom) Dickie Stoop	Frazer Nash Sebring	S2.0	101	DNF (Accident)	

=== Complete 12 Hours of Reims results ===
Year	Team	Co-drivers	Car	Class	Laps	Pos.	Class pos.
1954	(United Kingdom) H. W. Motors	(United Kingdom) Graham Whitehead	HWM-Jaguar		206	7th	7th

=== Complete 12 Hours of Hyères results ===
Year	Team	Co-drivers	Car	Class	Laps	Pos.	Class pos.
1953		(United Kingdom) Graham Whitehead	Aston Martin DB3			DNF	
1954	(United Kingdom) H.W. Motors	(United Kingdom) George Abecassis	HWM-Jaguar			DISQ (Disqualified)	
1955	(Australia) Kangaroo Stable	(Australia) David McKay	Aston Martin DB3S	S+2.0	220	2nd	2nd

=== Complete 12 Hours of Pescara results ===
Year	Team	Co-drivers	Car	Class	Laps	Pos.	Class pos.
1953	(United Kingdom) Tom Meyer	(United Kingdom) Tom Meyer	Aston Martin DB3	S+2.0		?th	3rd

=== Complete Rallye de Monte Carlo results ===
Year	Team	Co-drivers	Car	Pos.
1953		(Australia) Lex Davison (Australia) Stan Jones	Holden FX	64th

== Gliding ==
After a conversation with Prince Bira, who was an avid glider competitor, Gaze tried his hand at the sport. He became an active member of the Bristol and Gloucestershire Gliding Club, at Nympsfield and went on to represent Australia in the 1960 World Gliding Championships, which was held at the Butzweiler airfield, near Köln.

== Personal life ==
Tony Gaze was married twice; to Kay Wakefield who died in 1976 and to fellow racing car driver Diana Davison who died in 2012. Davison was the widow of Lex Davison. Gaze was also step-grandfather to the third generation of Davison racing drivers, Alex, Will and James.

== See also ==
- List of World War II flying aces
