= Lady Wigram Trophy =

The Lady Wigram Trophy is a New Zealand motorsport race trophy formerly awarded to the winner of the Wigram Airfield race. It made up part of the Tasman Series and classes like Formula Holden, Formula 5000, Formula Pacific and Formula Three. The Lady Wigram Trophy is now contested by the Toyota Racing Series at Euromarque Motorsport Park.

== Lady Wigram Trophy Winners ==
Ruapuna Park, used in 2003–2004, 2006–2012, 2015–2018 and 2024

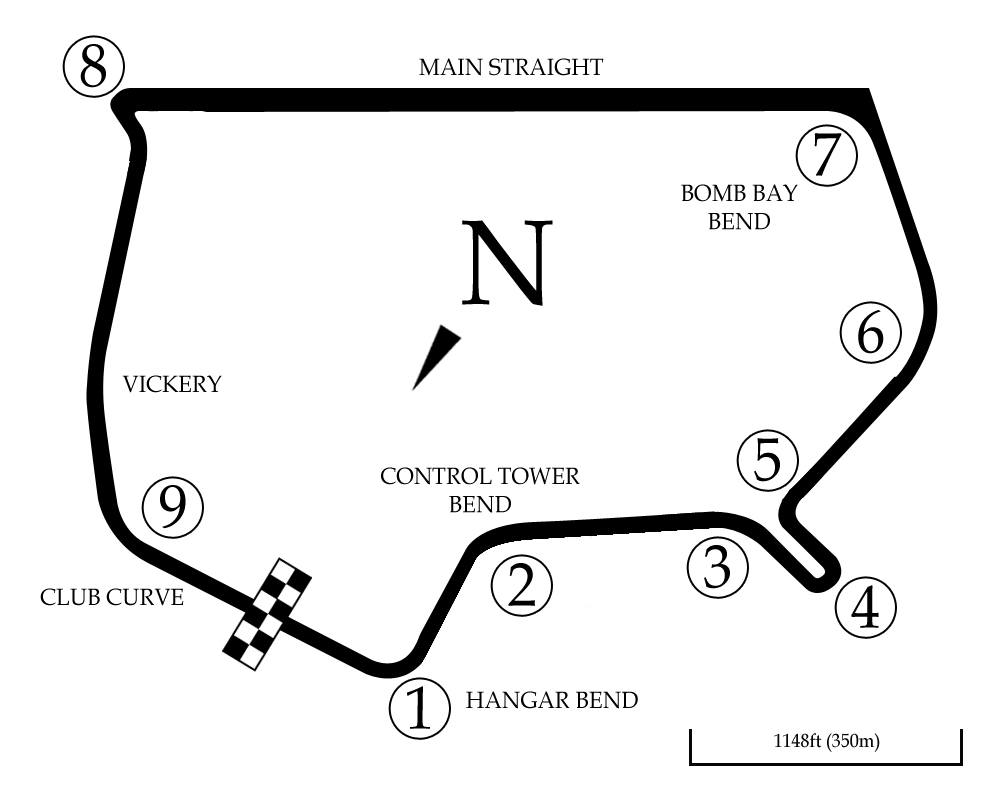
Wigram Airfield Circuit, used in 1951–1954 and 1956–1994

Year	Winner	Car	Circuit
1951	(New Zealand) Les Moore	Alfa Romeo Tipo B / Alfa 2905cc 8cyl s/c	Wigram Airfield Circuit
1952	(New Zealand) Les Moore	Alfa Romeo Tipo B / Alfa 2905cc 8cyl s/c	Wigram Airfield Circuit
1953	(New Zealand) Ron Roycroft	Alfa Romeo Tipo B / Alfa 2905cc 8cyl s/c	Wigram Airfield Circuit
1954	(United Kingdom) Peter Whitehead	Ferrari 125 / Ferrari 1995cc V12 s/c	Wigram Airfield Circuit
1955 not contested
1956	(United Kingdom) Peter Whitehead	Ferrari 500/750S / Ferrari 2968cc 4cyl	Wigram Airfield Circuit
1957	(United Kingdom) Peter Whitehead	Ferrari 555/860 / Ferrari 3431cc 4cyl	Wigram Airfield Circuit
1958	(United Kingdom) Archie Scott-Brown	Lister 57/1 / Jaguar 3781cc 6cyl	Wigram Airfield Circuit
1959	(United Kingdom) Ron Flockhart	BRM P25 / BRM 2497cc 4cyl	Wigram Airfield Circuit
1960	(Australia) Jack Brabham	Cooper T51 / Climax 2495cc 4cyl	Wigram Airfield Circuit
1961	(Australia) Jack Brabham	Cooper T53 / Climax 2495cc 4cyl	Wigram Airfield Circuit
1962	(United Kingdom) Stirling Moss	Lotus 21 / Climax 2495cc 4cyl	Wigram Airfield Circuit
1963	(New Zealand) Bruce McLaren	Cooper T62 / Climax 2750cc 4cyl	Wigram Airfield Circuit
1964	(New Zealand) Bruce McLaren	Cooper T70 / Climax 2499cc 4cyl	Wigram Airfield Circuit
1965	(United Kingdom) Jim Clark	Lotus 32B / Climax 2499cc 4cyl	Wigram Airfield Circuit
1966	(United Kingdom) Jackie Stewart	BRM P261 / BRM 1916cc V8	Wigram Airfield Circuit
1967	(United Kingdom) Jim Clark	Lotus 33 / Climax 1987cc V8	Wigram Airfield Circuit
1968	(United Kingdom) Jim Clark	Lotus 49T / Cosworth 2491cc V8	Wigram Airfield Circuit
1969	(Austria) Jochen Rindt	Lotus 49BT / Cosworth 2491cc V8	Wigram Airfield Circuit
1970	(Australia) Frank Matich	McLaren M10A / Chevrolet 4995cc V8	Wigram Airfield Circuit
1971	(New Zealand) Graham McRae	McLaren M10B / Chevrolet 4988cc V8	Wigram Airfield Circuit
1972	(New Zealand) Graham McRae	Leda GM1 / Chevrolet 4995cc V8	Wigram Airfield Circuit
1973	(New Zealand) Graham McRae	McRae GM1 / Chevrolet 4995cc V8	Wigram Airfield Circuit
1974	(Australia) John McCormack	Elfin MR5 Repco-Holden	Wigram Airfield Circuit
1975	(New Zealand) Graham McRae	McRae GM2 / Chevrolet 4995cc V8	Wigram Airfield Circuit
1976	(New Zealand) Ken Smith	Lola T332 / Chevrolet 4995cc V8	Wigram Airfield Circuit
1977	(United States) Tom Gloy	Tui BH2 - Ford BDA Nicholson	Wigram Airfield Circuit
1978	(Australia) Larry Perkins	Ralt RT1 - Ford BDA Swindon	Wigram Airfield Circuit
1979	(New Zealand) Dave McMillan	Ralt RT1 - Ford BDA Hart	Wigram Airfield Circuit
1980	(New Zealand) Dave McMillan	Ralt RT1 - Ford BDA Hart	Wigram Airfield Circuit
1981	(New Zealand) David Oxton	Ralt RT4/80 - Ford BDA	Wigram Airfield Circuit
1982	(Brazil) Roberto Moreno	Ralt RT4/82 - Ford BDA Nicholson	Wigram Airfield Circuit
1983	(Canada) Allen Berg	Ralt RT4/82 - Ford BDD	Wigram Airfield Circuit
1984	(United States) Davy Jones	Ralt RT4/82 - Ford BDD	Wigram Airfield Circuit
1985	(United States) Ross Cheever	Ralt RT4 Ford	Wigram Airfield Circuit
1986	(United States) Jeff MacPherson	Ralt RT4 Ford	Wigram Airfield Circuit
1987	(New Zealand) Paul Radisich	Ralt RT4 Ford	Wigram Airfield Circuit
1988	(United States) Dean Hall	Swift Cosworth	Wigram Airfield Circuit
1989	(Japan) Hiro Matsushita	Swift Cosworth	Wigram Airfield Circuit
1990	(New Zealand) Craig Baird	Swift Cosworth	Wigram Airfield Circuit
1991	(New Zealand) Ken Smith	Swift Toyota	Wigram Airfield Circuit
1992	(New Zealand) Craig Baird	Reynard 92H - Toyota	Wigram Airfield Circuit
1993	(New Zealand) Craig Baird	Reynard 92H - Toyota	Wigram Airfield Circuit
1994	(Australia) Paul Stokell	Reynard 90D Holden	Wigram Airfield Circuit
1995–2002 not contested
2003	(Australia) Darren Palmer	Dallara F301 - Opel Spiess	Ruapana Park
2004	(New Zealand) Daniel Gaunt	Dallara F301 - Opel Spiess	Ruapana Park
2005 not contested
2006	(New Zealand) Matthew Hamilton	Tatuus TT104ZZ Toyota	Ruapana Park
2007	(New Zealand) Daniel Gaunt	Tatuus TT104ZZ Toyota	Ruapana Park
2008	(New Zealand) Earl Bamber	Tatuus TT104ZZ Toyota	Ruapana Park
2009	(New Zealand) Ken Smith	Lola T430 - Chevrolet	Ruapana Park
2010	(New Zealand) Roger Williams	Lola T332 - Chevrolet	Ruapana Park
2011	(Canada) Jay Esterer	McRae GM1 - Chevrolet	Ruapana Park
2012	(New Zealand) Steve Ross	McRae GM1 - Chevrolet	Ruapana Park
2013–2014 not contested
2015	(Canada) Lance Stroll	Tatuus FT-50 Toyota	Mike Pero Motorsport Park
2016	(India) Jehan Daruvala	Tatuus FT-50 Toyota	Mike Pero Motorsport Park
2017	(India) Jehan Daruvala	Tatuus FT-50 Toyota	Mike Pero Motorsport Park
2018	(New Zealand) Marcus Armstrong	Tatuus FT-50 Toyota	Mike Pero Motorsport Park
2019–2023 not contested
2024	(New Zealand) Liam Sceats	Tatuus FT-60 Toyota	Euromarque Motorsport Park
