= Cooper T39 =

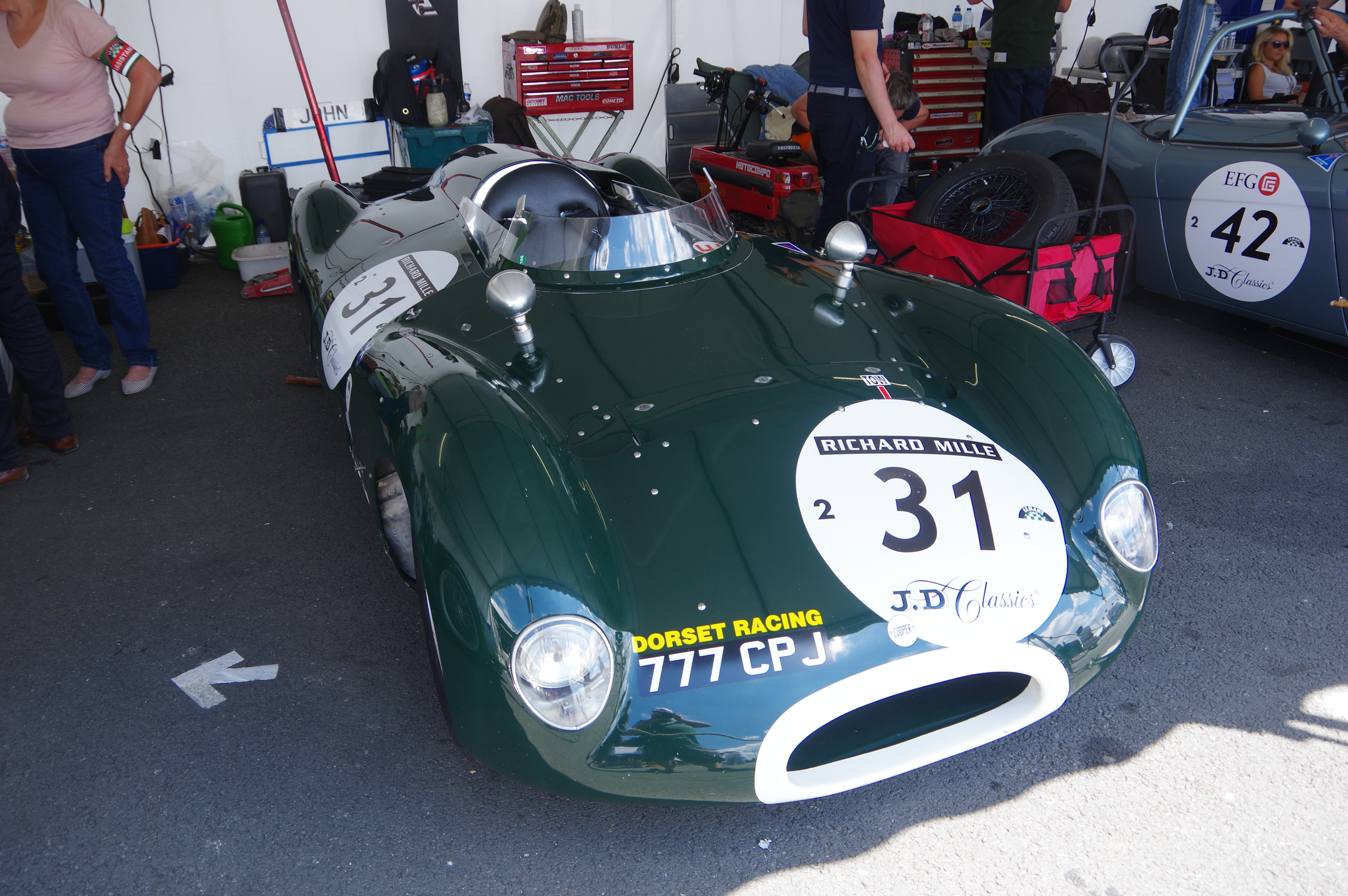
1955 Cooper T-39 at the Le Mans Classic in 2016

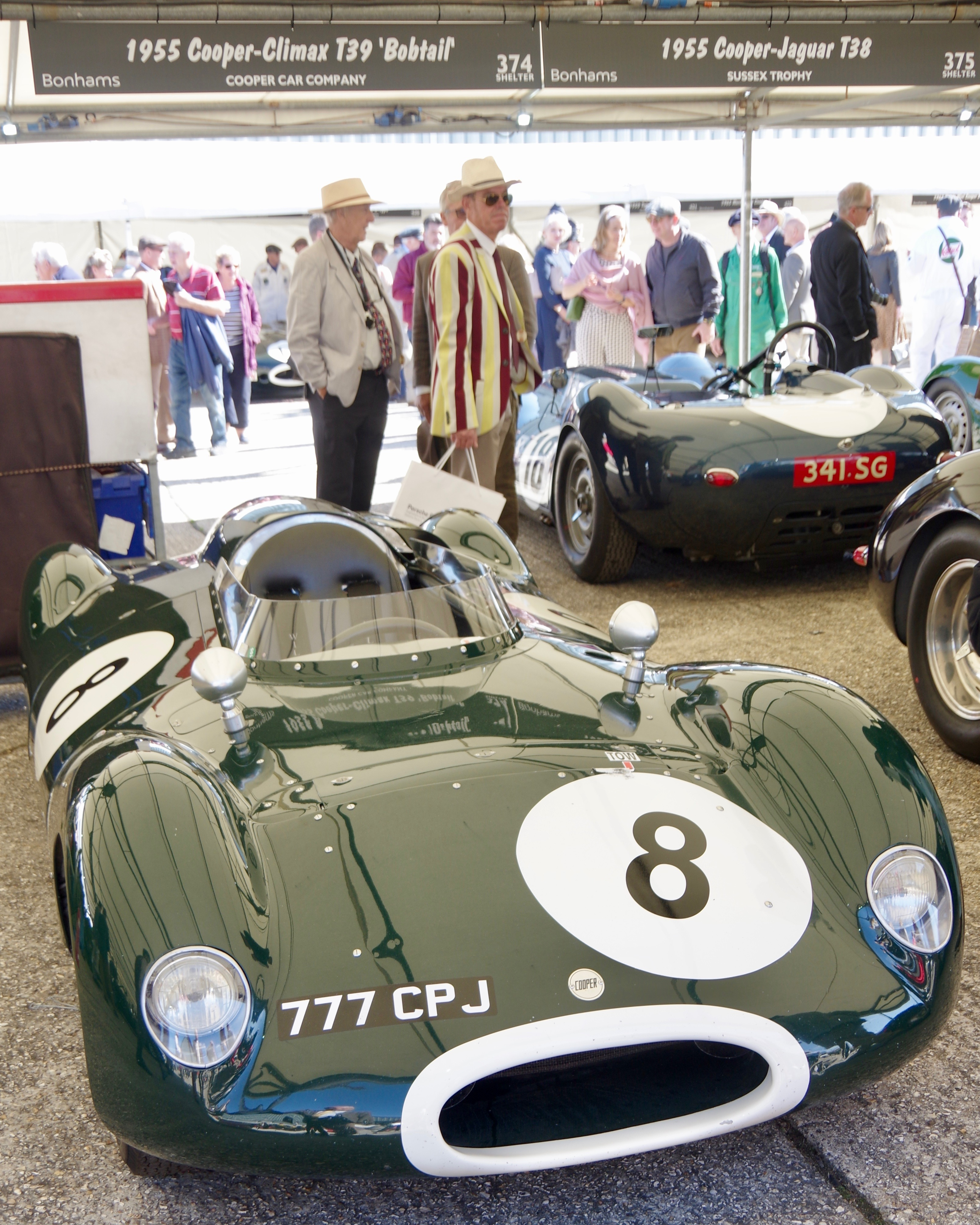
1955 Cooper T-39 at the Goodwood Revival in 2019

The Cooper T39, nicknamed the "Bob-Tail", is a successful lightweight, mid-engined, sports car, designed and developed by Owen Maddock at Cooper Cars, for sports car racing in 1955. The car debuted in active racing competition at the Easter race in Thruxton in 1955, being driven by Ivor Bueb, and was later entered into the 1955 24 Hours of Le Mans, being driven by John Brown and Edgar Wadsworth, but was unfortunately not classified, because even though the car managed to complete 207 laps around the 8.4-mile Le Mans circuit, it didn't manage to finish within 70% of the winners' race distance. However, between 1956 and 1962, it did manage to rack up and tally an incredible streak of domination and competitiveness, scoring 91 total wins and clinching 236 podiums finishes; an incredible record. It was powered by the 1,098 cc (67.0 cu in) Coventry-Climax four-cylinder engine.

== Development ==
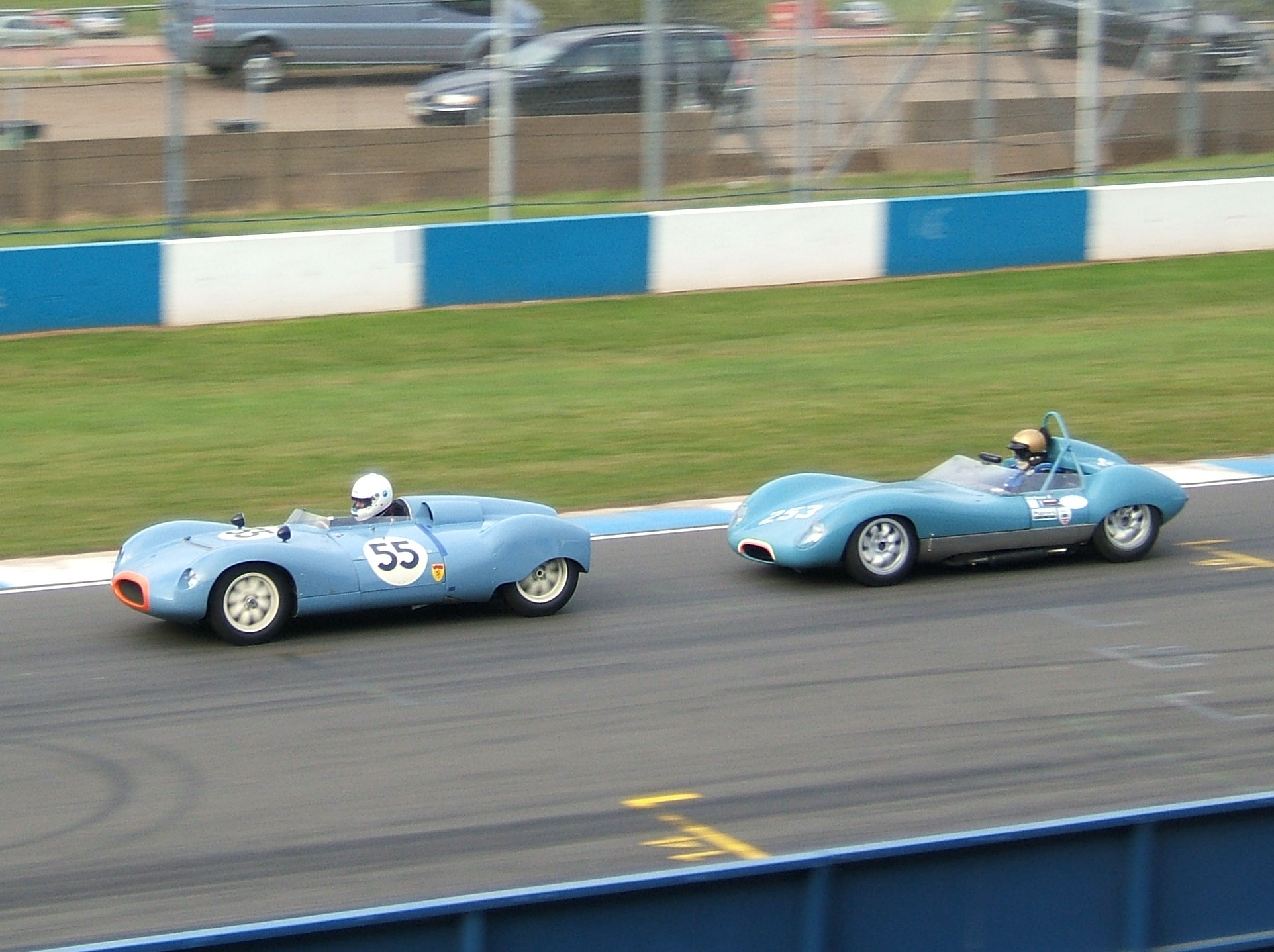
Cooper T-39 (front) being chased by a Lola Mk1 (behind) at Donington Park in 2007

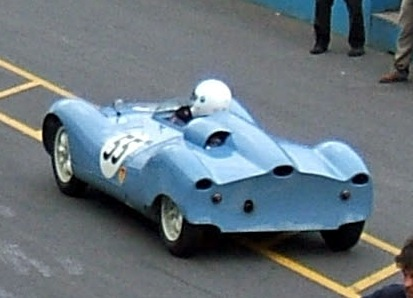
Cooper 'Bobtail' T-39 in the pits at Donington Park in 2007

Shortly after the end of the Second World War, the British racing car designer Charles Cooper and his son John began building racing cars. The Cooper Car Company initially developed small single-seater cars with the Junior and 3 racing formulas. Small sports cars were added later.

One of these developments was the T39 "Bobtail" from 1955. The vehicle concept had a lot in common with the monopostos, such as a lattice frame, 15-inch wheels, drum brakes, and wheels that were individually suspended on wishbones and transverse leaf springs. However, the engine was not arranged in front, but behind the driver in front of the rear axle. The first engine came from Coventry Climax, a 1.1-liter, the 4-cylinder in-line engine that was also used in the Lotus Eleven. Over the years, Cooper also used other engines in different chassis, for example, an engine from Volvo, boxer engines from Porsche, the 1.5-liter Coventry Climax FWB, and a 2-liter Bristol.

The Cooper T39 had a streamlined body made of aluminum. Cooper tried to keep the weight of the car as low as possible through extreme lightweight construction. Some cars were later rebuilt. The American racing driver Pete Lovely converted his T39 into a monoposto-like car with covered wheels.

=== History of the 'Bob-tail' sportscar ===
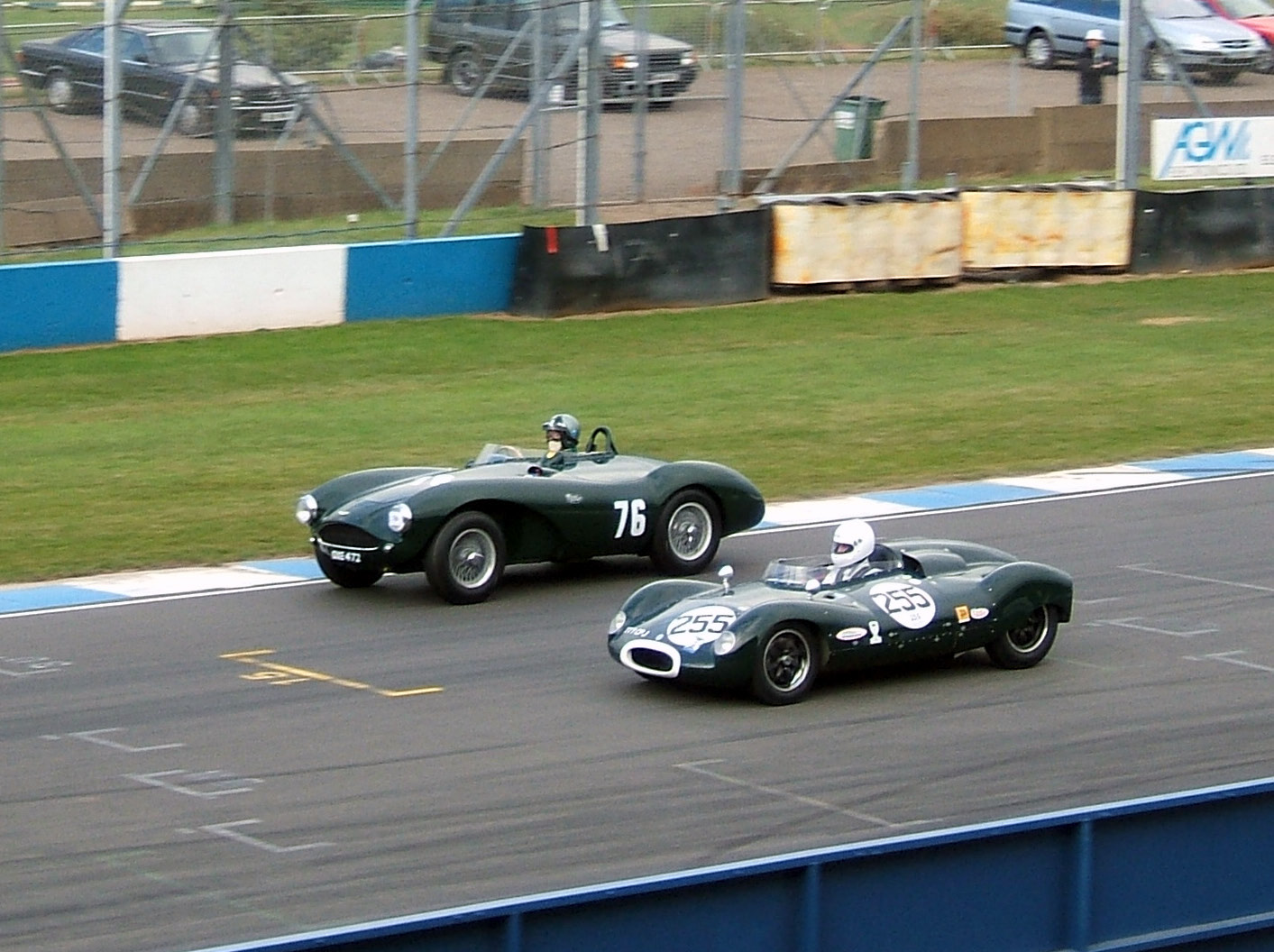
A Cooper T39 'Bob-tail' (right) alongside an Aston Martin DB3S, during a historic race meeting at Donington Park in 2007

Cooper's own route into Formula One was somewhat unorthodox. Following on from producing the Vanwall Maddock began work on a new sportscar, designed around Coventry Climax's new FWA 1,098 cc inline-four engine. Maddock and John Cooper decided to adapt the Mark IX Formula Three chassis to accept the larger, more powerful engine, retaining the engine mounted behind the driver and the driver's seat on the car's centre-line, per the single-seaters arrangement. The T39 chassis consequently featured Cooper's curved tube design, with the upper longerons sweeping up from the front suspension mounts, passing on either side of the driving position and engine, before looping back down the rear suspension. The passenger seat, mandated by sportscar rules of the time, was mounted outboard of the chassis on the driver's left.

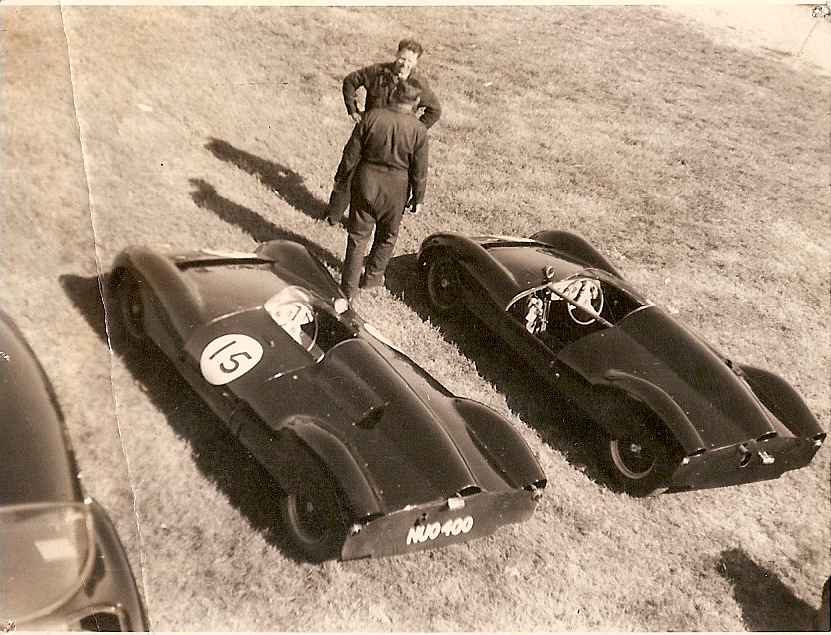
Two Equipe Endeavour T39 cars at Goodwood in 1955, clearly showing their flat, near-vertical, Kamm tail

The car gained its nickname from Maddock's unusual bodywork design. While the front of the car was relatively conventional, the rear featured an abbreviated, Kamm tail design. Maddock had been studying the theories of Professor Wunibald Kamm and decided to implement such an arrangement on the new car. Although the Kamm theory gained far wider application in the 1960s, in the mid-1950s the styling resulting from Professor Kamm's work was striking. The chopped-off look of the car's tail gained the new T39 sportscar the nicknames "Manx" and "bob-tail". John Cooper was, however, somewhat skeptical of the new silhouette, and regularly explained away its lack of tail by telling enquirers that "we had to cut it off because it wouldn't fit in the transporter otherwise".

In addition to being a highly competitive racing car, the Cooper Bob-tail was to form the basis for Cooper's first true attempt to enter the World Championship in their own right. Jack Brabham had gained a strong reputation as a racer in his native Australia driving a lightly modified Cooper Bristol which he branded the RedeX Special. On moving to the UK he picked up where he had left off, driving a Cooper-Alta in domestic British series. Brabham's visits to the Cooper works to collect spares led to collaboration with the Cooper outfit, and subsequently, wholesale integration with the Cooper works team. Eventually, he persuaded the Coopers to allow him to create a Formula One version of the T39 chassis around a 2-litre Bristol engine. Brabham, working almost alone on the car, completed the Formula One special the day before its first race: the 1955 British Grand Prix at Aintree Circuit. Although the car's engine failed on this first outing, subsequent development proved that the rear-engined Cooper was competitive with the Formula One machinery of the day, ultimately winning the 1955 Australian Grand Prix, and paved the way for the Cooper works to develop a proper slipper-bodied challenger.

== Racing and competition history ==
Over the years, T39s have been registered at 343 racing events, and 613 individual uses are known. 82 overall and 40 class wins were achieved.

For the first time, a T39 was entered at the Easter race in Thruxton in 1955. At the wheel of the works car sat Ivor Bueb, who finished the race behind Les Leston and Kenneth McAlpine (both on a Connaught AL / SR ) in third place. Bueb also clinched the first victory; he won a race at Brands Hatch two weeks later.

In the 1950s, different teams entered the model, primarily in national British sports car races, but also in World Sports Car Championship races. 1956 occupied Leech Cracraft and Red Byron in the 12-hour race at Sebring 21 overall and won the class for sports cars to 1.1 liters. In the 1956 Reims 12-hour race, Stirling Moss and Graham Hill drove a factory T39 but retired. At the 1956 24 Hours of Le Mans, Ed Hugus and John Bentley were eighth in the final ranking. T39s were used successfully until the mid-1960s.
