= Cooper T65 =

1963 Formula Junior racing car

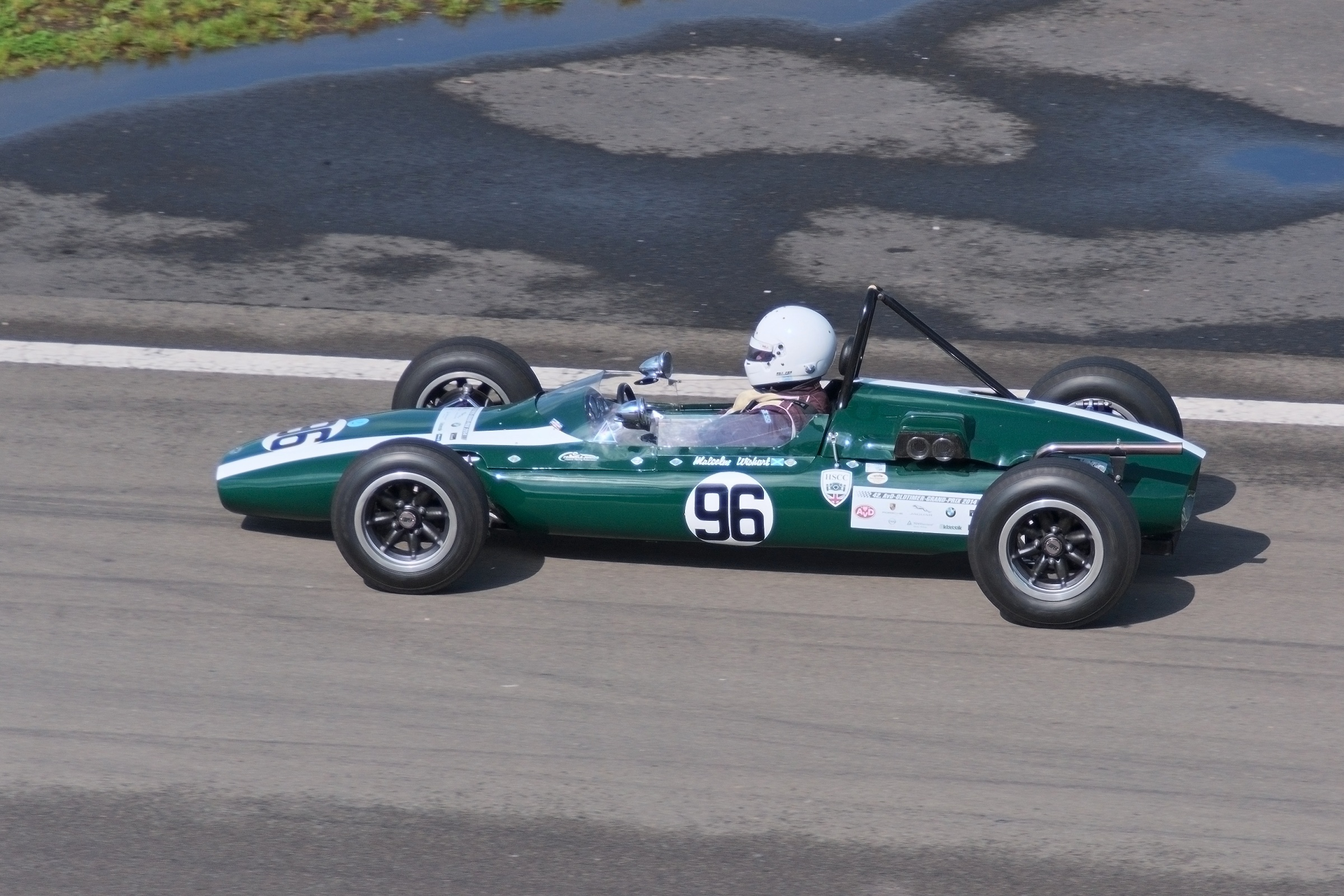
Cooper T65

The Cooper T65 (also known as the T67) was the fourth series Formula Junior racing car designed by the Cooper Car Company for the 1963 season, the final year of Formula Junior. Subsequently, it was available in Formula Two and Formula Three versions. At least one car was built with Hydrolastic suspension but this was not found to be suitable for racing. The T67 was even narrower than its T59 predecessor. T65s and T67s were again supplied with either Ford or the BMC 'A series' engines.

Jochen Rindt made his Grand Prix debut at the non-championship 1963 Austrian Grand Prix in a T67. He retired with a broken con-rod.
