= Frank Shuter (racing driver) =

New Zealand racing driver

Frank Shuter (9 April 1918 – 16 September 1969) was a New Zealand racing driver.

== Early life ==
Shuter was born and grew up in Rotorua. He later moved to the South Island, firstly to Timaru and then in 1952 to Christchurch. While living in Rotorua, he won the Waikato hydroplane championship and participated in cycle and motorcycle racing.

== Racing career ==
In the 1950s, Shuter's interest turned to motor racing and he drove and developed a car known as the Edelbrock Special. This car had a Chevrolet chassis and Shuter used Ford and Chevrolet V8 engines, fitted with Edelbrock cylinder heads. With this car, he won the New Zealand beach racing championship in 1955 and achieved podium results in the Mairehau street races and the Lady Wigram Trophy races. He also competed in hill climbs and at the Tahuna Beach races in Nelson and drove midget cars at the Aranui speedway track for three seasons from 1953–54 to 1955–56. In the late 1950s, he purchased two Maserati 8CLT racing cars from Fred Zambuka's estate for £500 each. Driving one of these vehicles he set a New Zealand flying kilometre speed record of 157.4 mph for cars in the 2000-3000cc class in 1959. The following year, he purchased a Ferrari 625 from Pat Hoare and had success in his first race with this car, winning a Gold Star race at Renwick in November 1960. At the 1961 Lady Wigram Trophy meeting, however, he crashed the car and it was badly damaged. After this incident, Shuter retired from driving in national events and only competed occasionally in local races in Christchurch and at Tahuna Beach in his V8 special. His elder son Frank also drove the car in the early 1960s.
