= Wigram Airfield Circuit =

Temporary motor racing circuit

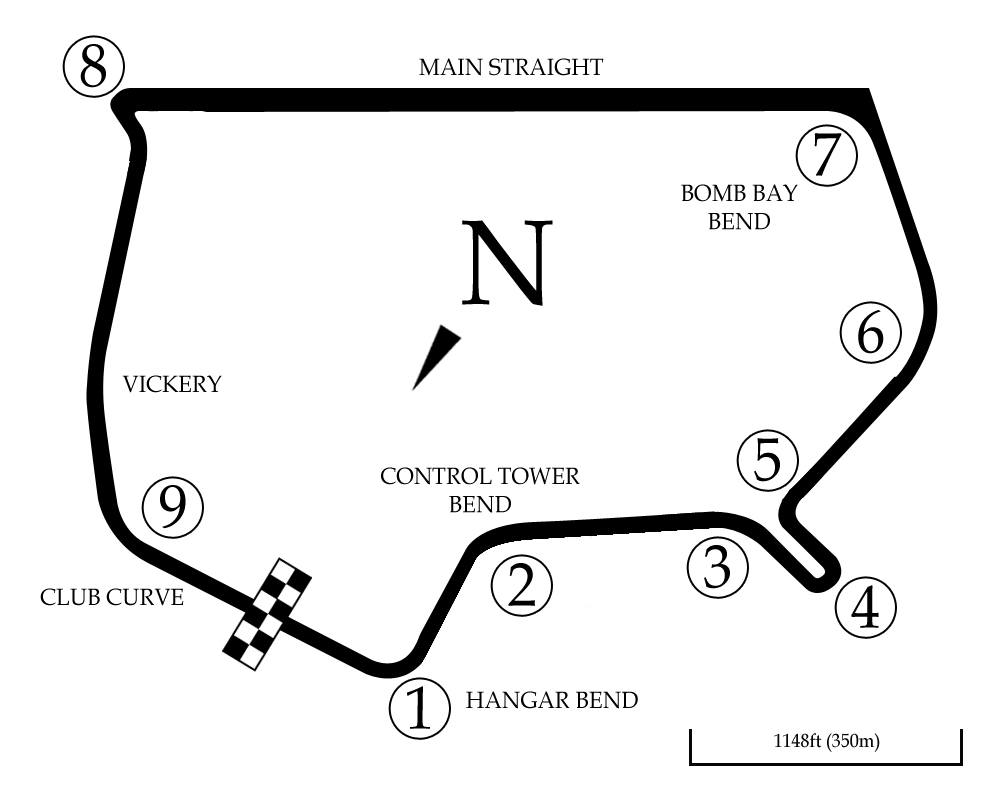
- Airfield Circuit (1949–2000)
- Location: Christchurch, New Zealand
- Coordinates: 43°33′5″S 172°33′6″E
- Owner: Ngai Tahu Property
- Opened: 1949
- Closed: 2000
- Major events: Lady Wigram Trophy (1951–1954, 1956–1994); Tasman Series (1964–1975); New Zealand Grand Prix (1974)

Airfield Circuit (1949–2000)
- Length: 3.540 km (2.200 miles)
- Turns: 9
- Race lap record: 1:03.6 ( (United Kingdom) Peter Gethin, Chevron B24, 1974, F5000)

Wigram Airfield Circuit was a temporary motor racing circuit at Wigram Aerodrome, Christchurch, New Zealand. The airfield is a former base of the Royal New Zealand Air Force. It is named after Sir Henry Wigram. The temporary circuit was 3.540 km (2.200 mi) with a 1.3 km (0.81 mi) main straight. The first summer meetings held at Wigram Aerodrome in 1949 are considered the oldest motor races in New Zealand. The track hosted rounds of the annual Tasman Series from 1964 to 1975. For safety reasons, the last race at Wigram (for classic racers) was held in the year 2000.

Wigram also held the 1974 New Zealand Grand Prix which was won by Australian race driver John McCormack.

The Lady Wigram Trophy which was organised by the Canterbury Car Club had been raced at Wigram Aerodrome since 1949. The race for the trophy has since moved to Powerbuilt Raceway at Ruapuna Park.

Ngai Tahu Property, the owners of the aerodrome, are acquiring the site as part of a treaty settlement claim. The aerodrome was closed to air traffic in September 2008 and has become a housing development "Wigram Skies".
