= 1968 Bathurst Gold Star Trophy =

Layout of the Mount Panorama Circuit (1938-1986)

The 1968 Bathurst Gold Star Trophy was a motor race staged at the Mount Panorama Circuit near Bathurst in New South Wales, Australia on 15 April 1968. The race was contested over 30 laps at a total distance of approximately 115 miles and it was Round 1 of the 1968 Australian Drivers' Championship.

The race was won by Phil West driving a Brabham BT23A Repco.

== Results ==
Pos	No	Entrant	Driver	Car	Race Time/DNF	Laps
1	7	Scuderia Veloce	Phil West	Brabham BT23A Repco	1:14:18.6	30
2	44	Max Stewart Motors	Max Stewart	Rennmax BN2 Ford	1:16:26.5	30
3	15	Ian Fergusson	Ian Fergusson	Lotus 27 Ford	+2 laps	28
4	81	Brian Page	Brian Page	Brabham BT2 Ford	+2 laps	28
5	10	Alfredo Costanzo	Alfredo Costanzo	Elfin Mono MkIIB Ford	+2 laps	28
6	17	Col Green	Col Green	Elfin Mono MkI Ford	+3 laps	27
7	26	Malcolm Bailey	Malcolm Bailey	Elfin Junior Peugeot	+11 laps	19
8	6	Alec Mildren Racing	Kevin Bartlett	Brabham BT23D Alfa Romeo	Rear Upright	25
9	3	N.E. Allen Competition	Niel Allen	McLaren M4A Cosworth	Gearbox	12
10	2	N.E. Allen Competition	Fred Gibson	Brabham BT16 Climax	Broken Oil Line	6
11	8	Merlynston Motors P/L	Clive Millis	Elfin Mono MkI Ford	Retired	2
DNS	9	Alton Boddenberg	Alton Boddenberg	Lotus 32 Ford	N/A	-
DNS	11	Bob Jane Racing Team	John Harvey	Brabham BT23E Repco	Accident in Practice	-
DNS	5	Geoghegan Racing Division	Leo Geoghegan	Lotus 39 Repco	Accident in Practice	-
