= 1969 Bathurst 100 =

1969 motor race

Layout of the Mount Panorama Circuit (1938–1986)

The 1969 Bathurst 100 was a motor race staged at the Mount Panorama Circuit near Bathurst in New South Wales, Australia on 7 April 1969. The race was contested over 26 laps at a total distance of approximately 100 miles and it was Round 2 of the 1969 Australian Drivers' Championship.

The race was won by Jack Brabham driving a Brabham BT31B Repco.

== Results ==
Pos	No	Entrant	Driver	Car	Race Time/DNF	Laps
1	6	Brabham Racing Organisation	Jack Brabham	Brabham BT31B Repco	1:00:22.1	26
2	4	Bob Jane Racing Team	John Harvey	Brabham BT23E Repco	1:01:53.7	26
3	11	Bill Patterson Motors	Henk Woelders	Elfin 600B Ford	1:01:57.8	24
4	9	Alton Boddenberg	Alton Boddenberg	Lotus 32 Ford	1:00:47.0	23
5	26	Malcolm Bailey	Malcolm Bailey	Elfin Junior Peugeot	1:01:01.7	20
6	29	Alan Watson	Alan Watson	Delta F69 Ford	1:00:57.7	14
7	5	Geoghegan Racing Division	Leo Geoghegan	Lotus 39 Repco	Gearbox	14
8	3	Brian Page Pty Ltd	Brian Page	Brabham BT23A Repco	Exhaust	13
9	20	Glyn Scott Motors	Glyn Scott	Bowin P3 Cosworth	Accident	0
10	2	N.E. Allen Competition	Niel Allen	McLaren M4A Cosworth	Accident	0
11	44	Alec Mildren Racing	Max Stewart	Mildren Waggott	Accident	0
DNS	12	Clive Millis Motors P/L	Clive Millis	Rennmax BN2 Ford	N/A	-
DNS	17	Col Green	Col Green	Brabham BT16 Climax	Accident in Practice	-
