= 1969 Australian Drivers' Championship =

Motor racing competition

Seasons
- ← 1968 1970 →

The 1969 Australian Drivers' Championship was a CAMS sanctioned Australian motor racing title for drivers of cars conforming to Australian National Formula or Australian Formula 2 regulations. The championship was contested over a six race series with the winner awarded the 1969 CAMS Gold Star. It was the thirteenth Australian Drivers' Championship to be awarded by CAMS.

Kevin Bartlett won his second Australian Drivers' Championship driving the Mildren Mono which was powered by an Alfa Romeo V8 engine in the early races and by a Waggott TC4V inline 4 for the last three races. Bartlett won three of the six races to finish 16 points ahead of Leo Geoghegan (Lotus 39 Repco). Bartlett's Alec Mildren Racing team mate Max Stewart finished third in the points standings, driving the Mildren Waggott built by Rennmax Engineering.

In addition to Bartlett's three wins, single race victories were taken by Jack Brabham (Repco Brabham BT31), John Harvey (Repco Brabham BT23E) and Garrie Cooper (Elfin 600C Repco).

== Race schedule ==
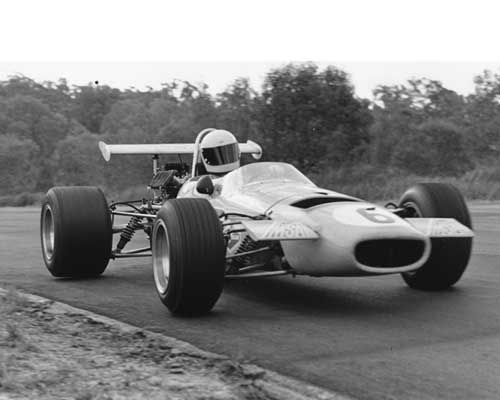
Max Stewart placed third in the championship driving the Mildren Waggott (pictured above in 1971)

The championship was contested over a six race series.

Race	Race name	Circuit	State	Date	Winning driver	Winning car
1		Symmons Plains	Tasmania	3 March	Kevin Bartlett	Mildren Mono Alfa Romeo
2	Bathurst 100	Mount Panorama, Bathurst	New South Wales	7 April	Jack Brabham	Repco Brabham BT31 Repco
3	Victoria Trophy	Sandown Park	Victoria	21 September	John Harvey	Repco Brabham BT23E Repco
4		Mallala	South Australia	13 October	Garrie Cooper	Elfin 600C Repco
5	Surfers Paradise Trophy	Surfers Paradise	Queensland	26 October	Kevin Bartlett	Mildren Mono Waggott
6	Sam Hordern Memorial Trophy	Warwick Farm	New South Wales	7 December	Kevin Bartlett	Mildren Mono Waggott

== Points system ==
Championship points were awarded on a 9-6-4-3-2-1 basis to the first six placegetters in each race. Each driver could only the points earned in his or her best five race results. Only holders of a current and valid General Competition License issued by CAMS were eligible.

== Championship results ==
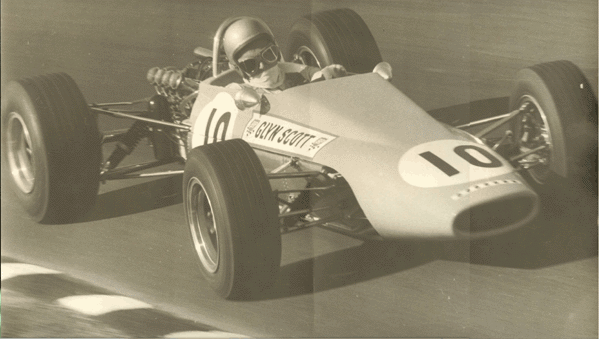
Glyn Scott placed ninth driving a Bowin P3 Ford Cosworth FVA

Position	Driver	Car	Entrant	Sym.	Bat.	San.	Mal.	Sur.	War.	Total
1	Kevin Bartlett	Mildren Mono Alfa Romeo & Mildren Mono Waggott	Alec Mildren Racing	9	-	6	3	9	9	36
2	Leo Geoghegan	Lotus 39 Repco	Geoghegan Racing Division	6	-	1	6	4	3	20
3	Max Stewart	Mildren Waggott	Alec Mildren Racing	-	-	-	4	6	6	16
4	John Harvey	Repco Brabham BT23E Repco	Bob Jane Racing Team	-	6	9	-	-	-	15
=	Neil Allen	McLaren M4A Ford Cosworth FVA	NE Allen Competition	4	-	4	-	3	4	15
6	Garrie Cooper	Elfin 600B Ford & Elfin 600C Repco	Elfin Sports Cars	-	-	3	9	-	-	12
7	Jack Brabham	Repco Brabham BT31 Repco	Jack Brabham	-	9	-	-	-	-	9
8	Henk Woelders	Elfin 600B Ford	Bill Patterson Motors	2	4	2	-	-	-	8
9	Glyn Scott	Bowin P3 Ford Cosworth FVA	Glyn Scott Motors	3	-	-	-	2	-	5
10	Alton Boddenburg	Lotus 32 Ford	Alton Boddenburg	-	3	-	-	-	-	3
11	Jack Bono	Brabham BT2 Ford	Graham Collier	-	-	-	2	-	-	2
=	Malcolm Bailey	Elfin Catalina Peugeot	Malcolm Bailey	-	2	-	-	-	-	2
=	Ken Goodwin	Rennmax BN3 Ford	Peter Clark Surfboards	-	-	-	-	-	2	2
14	Alan Watson	Delta Ford	Alan Watson	-	1	-	-	-	-	1
=	John Ampt	Elfin Mono MK 2D Ford	John Ampt	-	-	-	1	-	-	1
=	Ian Ferguson	Bowin P3a Ford	Ian Ferguson	-	-	-	-	1	-	1
=	Ivan Tighe	Elfin 600B Ford	Ivan Tighe	-	-	-	-	-	1	1

== Championship name ==
The 1969 championship has been referred to under various names including Australian Championship for Drivers, Australian Gold Star Championship, Gold Star Championship, Gold Star Series and Australian Drivers' Championship. The latter is used by CAMS in its historical records of the championship.
