= 1968 Australian Drivers' Championship =

Motor racing competition

Seasons
- ← 1967 1969 →

The 1968 Australian Drivers' Championship was a CAMS-sanctioned national motor racing title open to racing cars complying with the Australian National Formula or the Australian 1½ Litre Formula. The title was contested over a six-race series, with the winner awarded the 1968 CAMS Gold Star.

The championship was won by Kevin Bartlett driving a Brabham BT23D Alfa Romeo. Bartlett won three of the six races to finish ten points ahead of Phil West (Brabham BT23A-Repco). Third was Glyn Scott (Bowin P3-Cosworth). In addition to Bartlett's wins, single-race victories were taken by West, Scott and Leo Geoghegan (Lotus 39-Repco).

== Race schedule ==
The championship was contested over a six race series with each race also incorporating a round of the 1968 Australian 1½ Litre Championship.

Race	Circuit	State	Date	Winning driver	Car	Entrant
Bathurst Gold Star Trophy	Mount Panorama, Bathurst	New South Wales	15 April	Phil West	Repco Brabham BT23A Repco	Scuderia Veloce
Governor's Trophy	Lakeside	Queensland	28 April	Kevin Bartlett	Brabham BT23D Alfa Romeo	Alec Mildren Racing
Rothmans Trophy	Surfers Paradise	Queensland	25 August	Kevin Bartlett	Brabham BT23D Alfa Romeo	Alec Mildren Racing
Lombard (Aust.) Victoria Trophy	Sandown	Victoria	15 September	Glyn Scott	Bowin P3 Ford Cosworth FVA	Glyn Scott Motors
Advertiser Trophy	Mallala	South Australia	14 October	Leo Geoghegan	Lotus 39 Repco	Geoghegan Racing Team
Hordern Trophy	Warwick Farm	New South Wales	1 December	Kevin Bartlett	Brabham BT23D Alfa Romeo	Alec Mildren Racing

== Points system ==
Championship points were awarded on a 9-6-4-3-2-1 basis to the first six eligible placegetters in each race. Only holders of a valid CAMS Competition License were eligible to score points and only the best five race results could be retained by each driver.

== Championship results ==
Position	Driver	Car	Entrant	Bathurst	Lakeside	Surfers	Sandown	Mallala	Warwick Fm	Total
1	Kevin Bartlett	Brabham BT23D Alfa Romeo	Alec Mildren Racing	-	9	9	-	6	9	33
2	Phil West	Repco Brabham BT23A Repco	Scuderia Veloce	9	6	-	-	2	6	23
3	Glyn Scott	Bowin P3 Ford Cosworth FVA	Glyn Scott Motors	-	-	4	9	4	-	17
4	Leo Geoghegan	Lotus 39 Repco	Geoghegan Racing Team	-	-	6	-	9	-	15
5	Garrie Cooper	Elfin 600B Ford	Elfin Sports Cars	-	-	-	6	3	2	11
6	Max Stewart	Rennmax BN2 Ford	Max Stewart Motors	6	-	3	-	1	-	10
7	Ian Fergusson	Lotus 27 Ford	Ian Fergusson	4	2	-	-	-	-	6
=	Peter Macrow	McLaren M4A Ford Cosworth FVA	Argo Racing	-	4	2	-	-	-	6
9	John Ampt	Elfin Mono Mk2D Ford	J Ampt	-	-	-	4	-	-	4
=	Fred Gibson	McLaren M4A Ford Cosworth FVA	NE Allen Comp. Pty Ltd	-	-	-	-	-	4	4
=	Clive Millis	Elfin Mono "Mk1" Ford	Merlynston Motors	-	-	-	3	-	1	4
12	John Walker	Elfin Mono 2B Ford	Gilbert Motor Bodies	-	-	-	-	-	3	3
=	Brian Page	Repco Brabham BT2 Ford	Brian Page	3	-	-	-	-	-	3
=	Ian Cook	Repco Brabham BT23E Repco	Bob Jane Racing	-	3	-	-	-	-	3
15	Alfredo Costanzo	Elfin Mono Ford	A Costanzo	2	-	-	-	-	-	2
=	Mal Aldred	MRC Lotus 22 Ford	Motor Racing Components	-	1	1	-	-	-	2
=	Maurie Quincey	Elfin 600B Ford	Maurie Quincey Ltd	-	-	-	2	-	-	2
18	Col Green	Elfin Mono "Mk1" Ford	C Green	1	-	-	-	-	-	1
