= 1962 Keens Mustard Trophy Series =

The 1962 Keens Mustard Trophy Series was an Australian motor racing competition for Formula Junior cars. It the first and only running of the series.

The series was won by Leo Geoghegan driving a Lotus 20.

== Series schedule ==
The series was contested over seven heats.

Heat	Race	Circuit	Date	Winning driver	Winning car	Winning entrant
1	NSW Craven Filter Formula Junior Championship	Catalina Park	11 March	G. Youl	MRD	Scuderia Veloce
2	Queensland Formula Junior Championship	Lakeside	13 May	L. Geoghegan	Lotus 20	Geoghegan Motors
3		Mallala	4 June	G. Harrison	Elfin	Autocorse - Elfin
4		Warwick Farm	5 August	L. Geoghegan	Lotus 20	Geoghegan Motors
5		Lowood	9 September	L. Ayers	Lotus 20	Motor Racing Co.
6		Hume Weir	23 September	L. Geoghegan	Lotus 20	Geoghegan Motors
7	Victorian Formula Junior Championship	Winton	9 December	John Ampt	Ausper	John Ampt
8		Phillip Island	26 December	Not held		

== Points system ==
Points were awarded on a 12-7-5-3-2-1 basis in each heat.

== Series standings ==
The series was won by Leo Geoghegan driving a Lotus 20.

== See also ==
- 1962 Australian Formula Junior Championship
