= Australian Formula Junior Championship =

- Category: Open Wheel Racing; Formula Junior
- Country: Australia
- Inaugural season: 1962
- Folded: 1963
- Last Drivers' champion: Leo Geoghegan

The Australian Formula Junior Championship was a short-lived motor racing championship held in Australia for drivers of open-wheel racing cars conforming to Formula Junior regulations. The championship was sanctioned by the Australian governing body CAMS and held for just two years. While Formula Junior cars began appearing in Australia as early as 1960, the category did not get a national championship until 1962. Both championships held were single event championships and were held in 1962 and 1963. The main distinguishing feature of Formula Junior in this period was its engine capacity, which was set at 1100 cubic centimetres, with engines being sourced from a regularly available production road car with the Ford engine available in the Ford Anglia amongst the most prolific. For 1964 Formula Junior was combined into the newly established Australian Formula 2 which also featured 1000 cc engined cars with specialist racing engines.

The Australian Formula Junior Championship was the first major title in Australia to be held to an international set of regulations.

Today Formula Junior is a popular historic racing category in Australia, with Formula Junior again having a national series and regularly assembles grid of over 20 cars.

== Champions ==
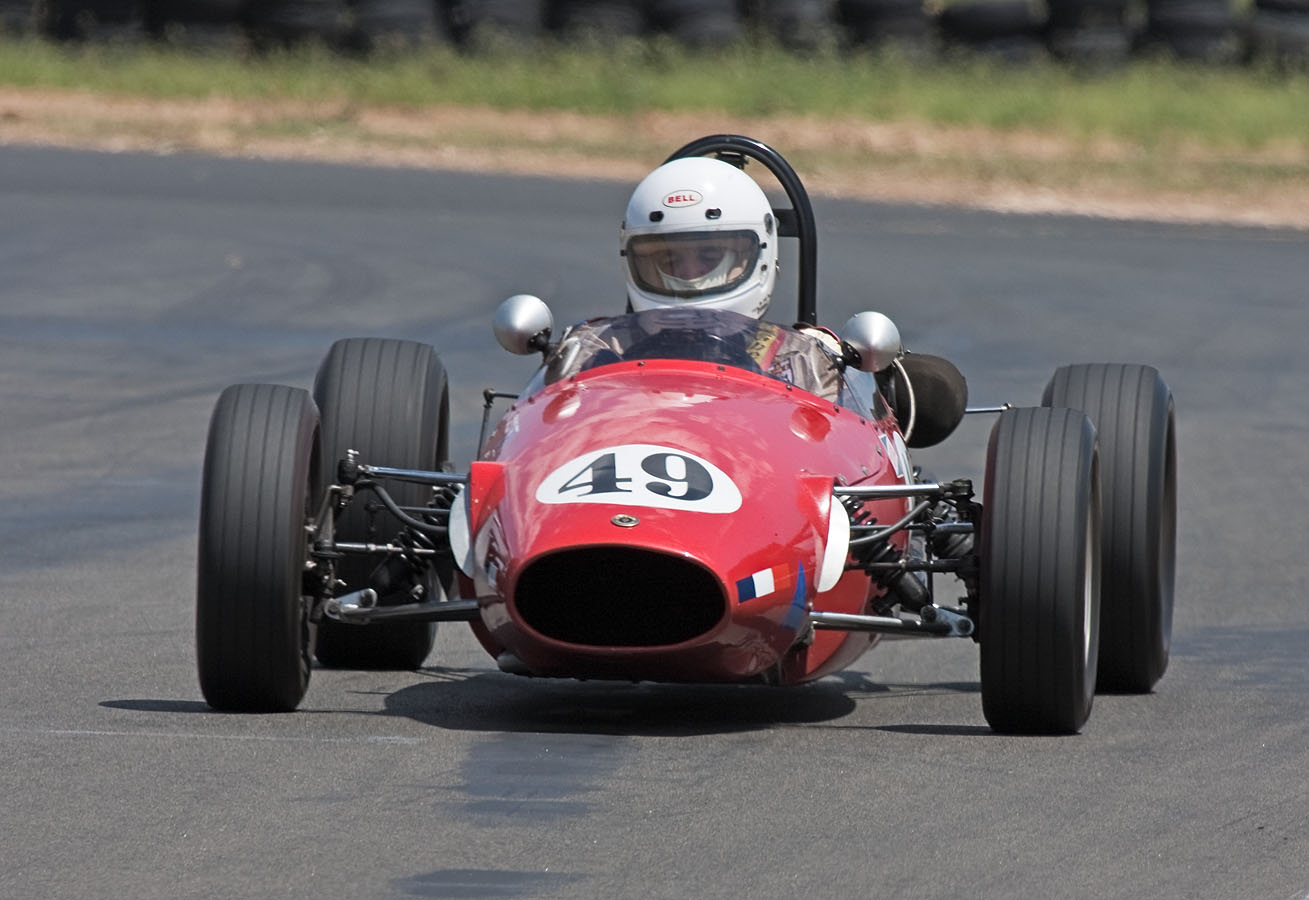
An Elfin FJ similar to the car in which Frank Matich won the 1962 Australian Formula Junior Championship

Year	Champion	Car	Circuit
1962	Frank Matich	Elfin FJ Ford Cosworth	Catalina Park
1963	Leo Geoghegan	Lotus 22 Ford	Warwick Farm Raceway
