= 1963 Australian Formula Junior Championship =

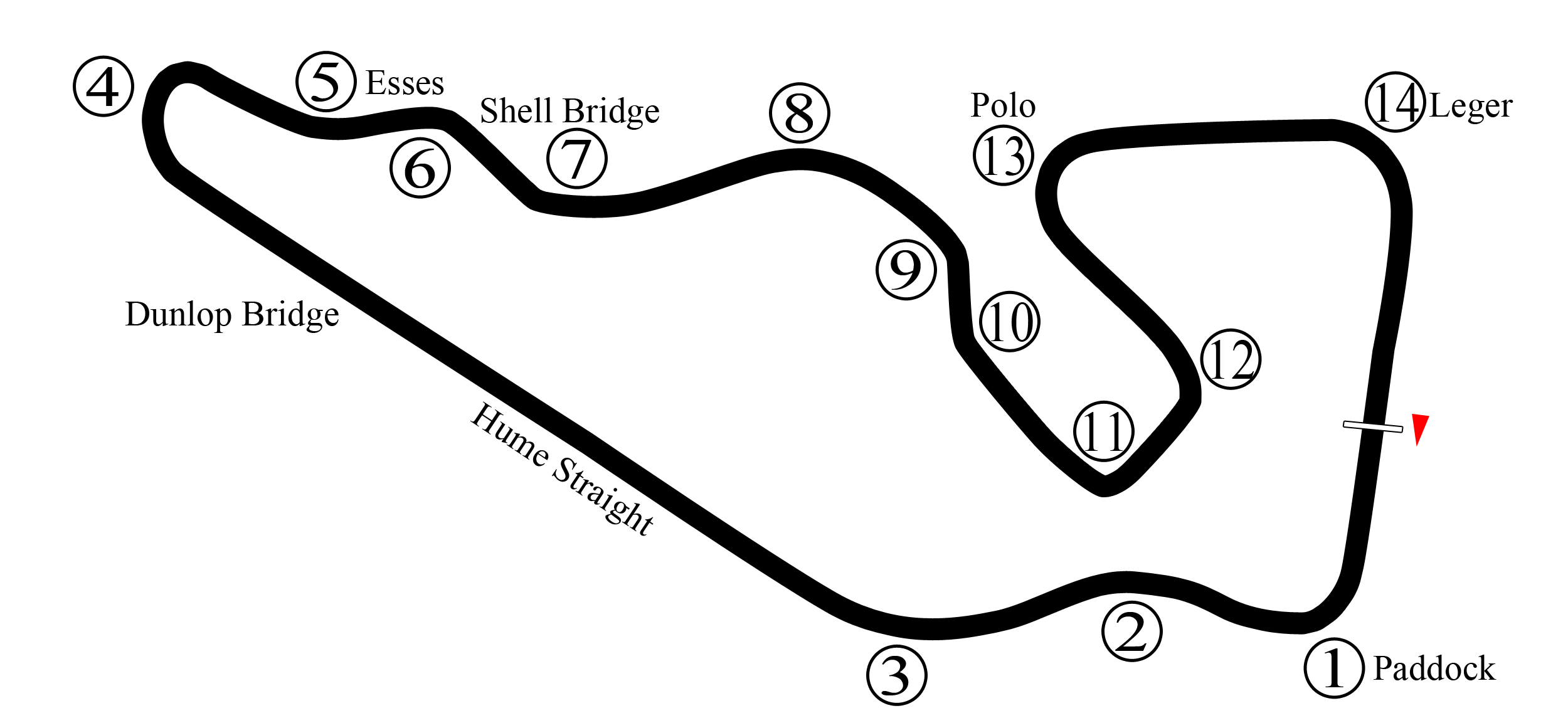
Layout of the Warwick Farm Raceway (1960–1973)

The 1963 Australian Formula Junior Championship was an Australian motor racing competition open to racing cars complying with "Australian Formula Junior" regulations. The championship was decided over a single race which was staged at the Warwick Farm Raceway in New South Wales, Australia on 8 September 1963. It was the second and final Australian Formula Junior Championship title to be awarded by the Confederation of Australian Motor Sport. The championship race meeting was organised by the Australian Automobile Racing Company Ltd.

The championship was won by Leo Geoghegan driving a Lotus 22 Ford for the Total Team.

== Results ==
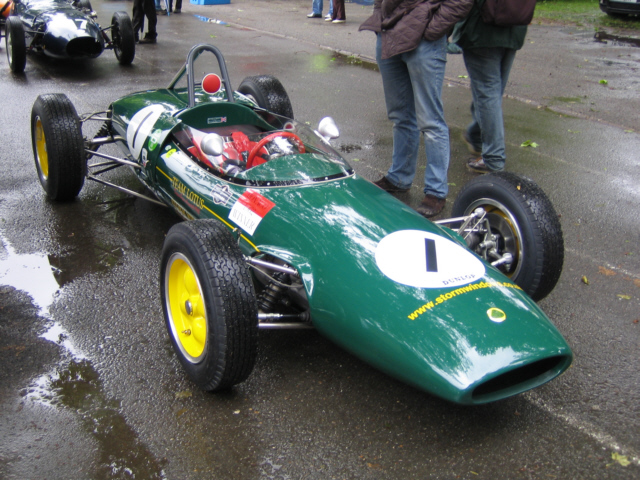
Leo Geoghegan won the championship driving a Lotus 22, similar to that pictured above

Pos.	Driver	No.	Car	Entrant	Laps
1	Leo Geoghegan	10	Lotus 22 Ford	Total Team	34
2	Greg Cusack	3	Repco Brabham Ford	Scuderia Veloce	34
3	Jack Hunnam	6	Elfin Ford	Jack Hunnam Motors	33
4	David Walker	4	Repco Brabham Ford	Scuderia Veloce	33
5	Kingsley Hibbard	21	Rennmax Ford	K. Hibbard	33
6	Lionel Ayers	11	Lotus 20 Ford	Motor Racing Components	33
7	G. McClelland	1	Repco Brabham Ford	G.B. McClelland	?
8	Peter Wherrett	8	Lynx Ford	Young Auto Racing Team	?
9	H. Budd	18	Jolus Ford	H. Budd	?
?	Jack Gates	16	Lotus 18 Ford	Apex Autos, Newcastle	?
DNF	Charlie Smith	7	Elfin Ford	C.G. Smith	?
DNF	Jim Palmer	5	Elfin Ford	Scuderia Veloce	13
DNF	Ken Milburn	14	Lotus 20 Ford	K. Milburn	11
DSQ	Nev McKay	15	Lotus 20 Ford	Scuderia Birchwood	?

=== Notes ===
- Pole Position: Leo Geoghegan, 1:42.1
- Attendance: 15,000
- Race distance: 34 laps, 76.5 miles
- Starters: 14
- Winner's race time: 58:01.9
- Winner's average speed: 79.10 mph
- Winning margin: 45.1s
- Fastest Lap: Leo Geoghegan, 1:40.7 (New Formula Junior lap record)
