= Alfa Romeo Tipo 33 =

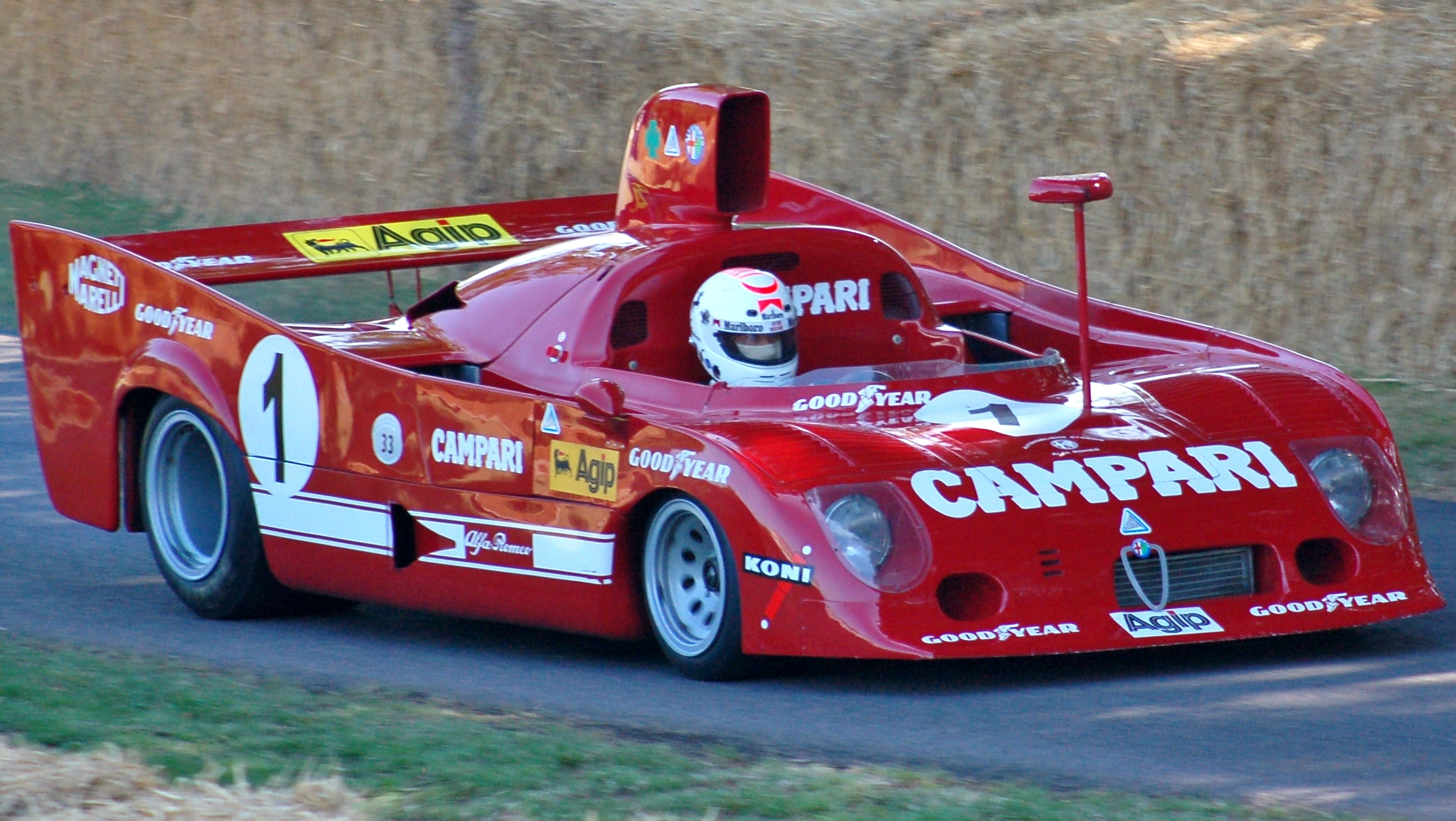
Arturo Merzario demonstrating a Alfa Romeo Tipo 33 TT 12 at the 2009 Goodwood Festival of Speed

The Alfa Romeo Tipo 33 was range of sports racing prototypes raced by the Alfa Romeo factory-backed team between 1967 and 1977. Initially it was powered by a 2 liter V8. Originally intended as 50 cars for Group 4 homologation, less than two dozen road going cars were derived from it in 1967, called Alfa Romeo 33 Stradale.

Later versions had the V8 increased to the 3 liter size allowed since 1968 for Group 6 prototypes in the World Sportscar Championship, but there it had to face also 5 liter engines in Group 4 sportscars that had been built in series of 25 or more. Anyway, the T33/3 won three races of the 1971 World Sportscar Championship otherwise dominated by Porsche 917.

The T33 cars took part for Sport Cars World Championship, Nordic Challenge Cup, Interserie and CanAm series.

Alfa then moved on to a 3 liter flat-12 engine later also used in Brabham F1 cars, and in Alfas own F1 car.

The 33TT12 Alfa Romeo won the 1975 World Championship for Makes, and the 33SC12 the 1977 World Championship for Sports Cars, taking the first place in all eight of the championship races.

== Alfa Romeo Tipo 33 ==
Alfa Romeo 33
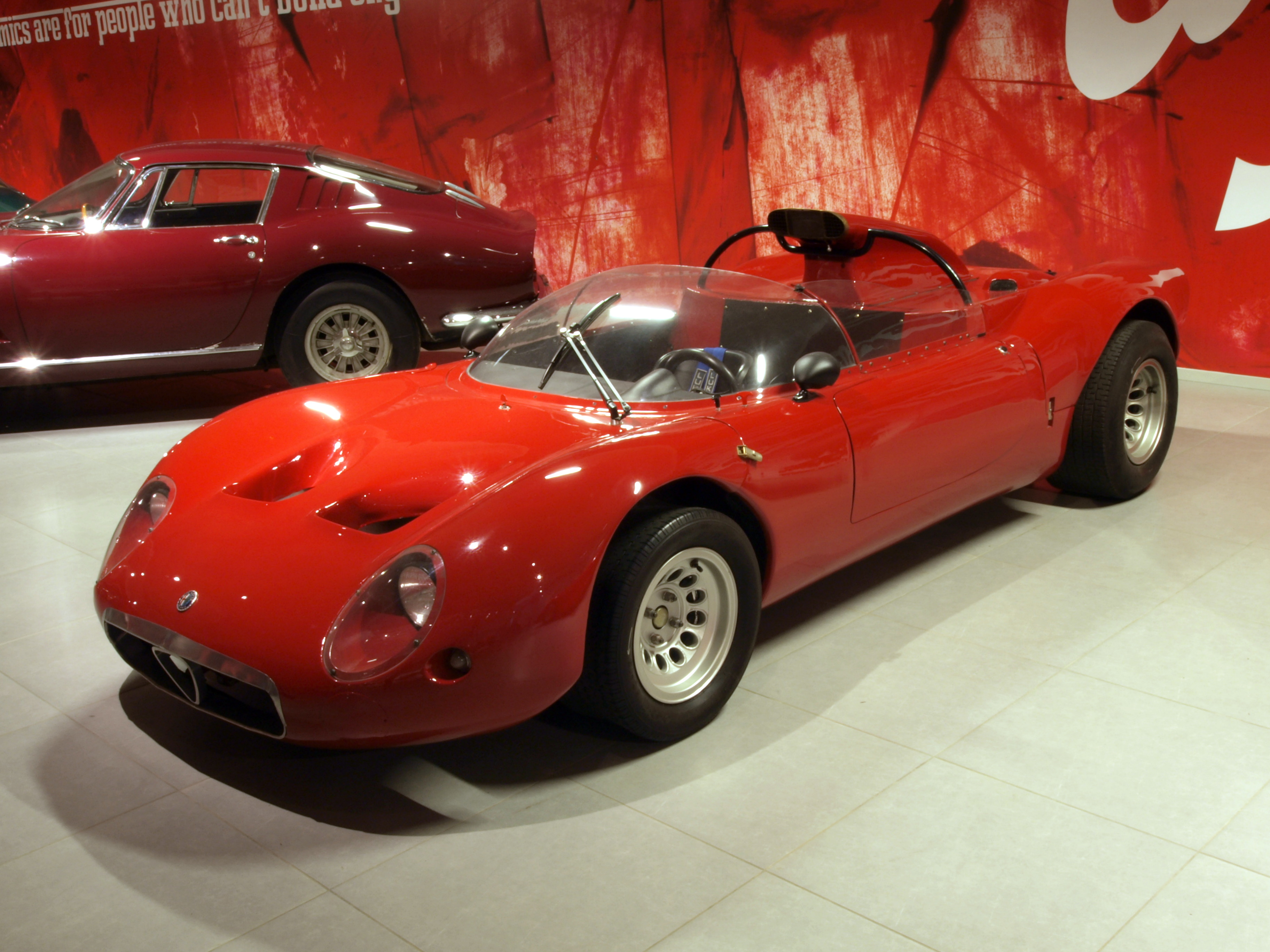

Overview
- Manufacturer: Alfa Romeo
- Production: 1966–1967; 5 produced
- Designer: Carlo Chiti

Body and chassis
- Class: Group 6 Prototype
- Layout: Rear mid-engine, rear wheel drive

Powertrain
- Engine: 2.0 L (1,995 cc) 90° V8; 270 bhp @ 9,600 rpm
- Transmission: 6-speed manual

Dimensions
- Length: 3,690 mm (145.3 in)
- Width: 1,760 mm (69.3 in)
- Height: 990 mm (39.0 in)
- Curb weight: 580 kg (1,279 lb)

Alfa Romeo started development of the Tipo 33 in the early 1960s, with the first car being built in 1965. It was sent to Autodelta to be completed and for additional changes to be made. It used a straight-4 engine from the TZ2, but Autodelta fitted it with a bespoke V8 engine soon after. The 1,995 cc (2.0 L; 121.7 cu in) V8 engine has a bank angle of 90° and is rated at 270 hp (274 PS; 201 kW) at 9,600 rpm, with a large-diameter tube frame. The Tipo 33 mid-engine prototype debuted on 12 March 1967 at the Belgian hillclimbing event at Fléron, with Teodoro Zeccoli taking the win for Alfa Romeo.

The first version was nick named the “periscope” type because it had very characteristic air inlet on the roof resembling a periscope objective. Such air scoops were already on the 1965 Fiat Abarth OT 1300 'Periscopio' and the 1966 Chaparral 2D, while Formula One adopted these Ram Air Boxes only in the early 1970s, with heights limited after the 1975 Formula One season.

The original T33 proved unreliable and uncompetitive in the 1967 World Sportscar Championship season, its best result a 5th at the Nürburgring 1000, co-driven by Zeccoli and Roberto Bussinello.

== Alfa Romeo T33/2 ==
Alfa Romeo T33/2 Alfa Romeo T33/2 Daytona 2.5L
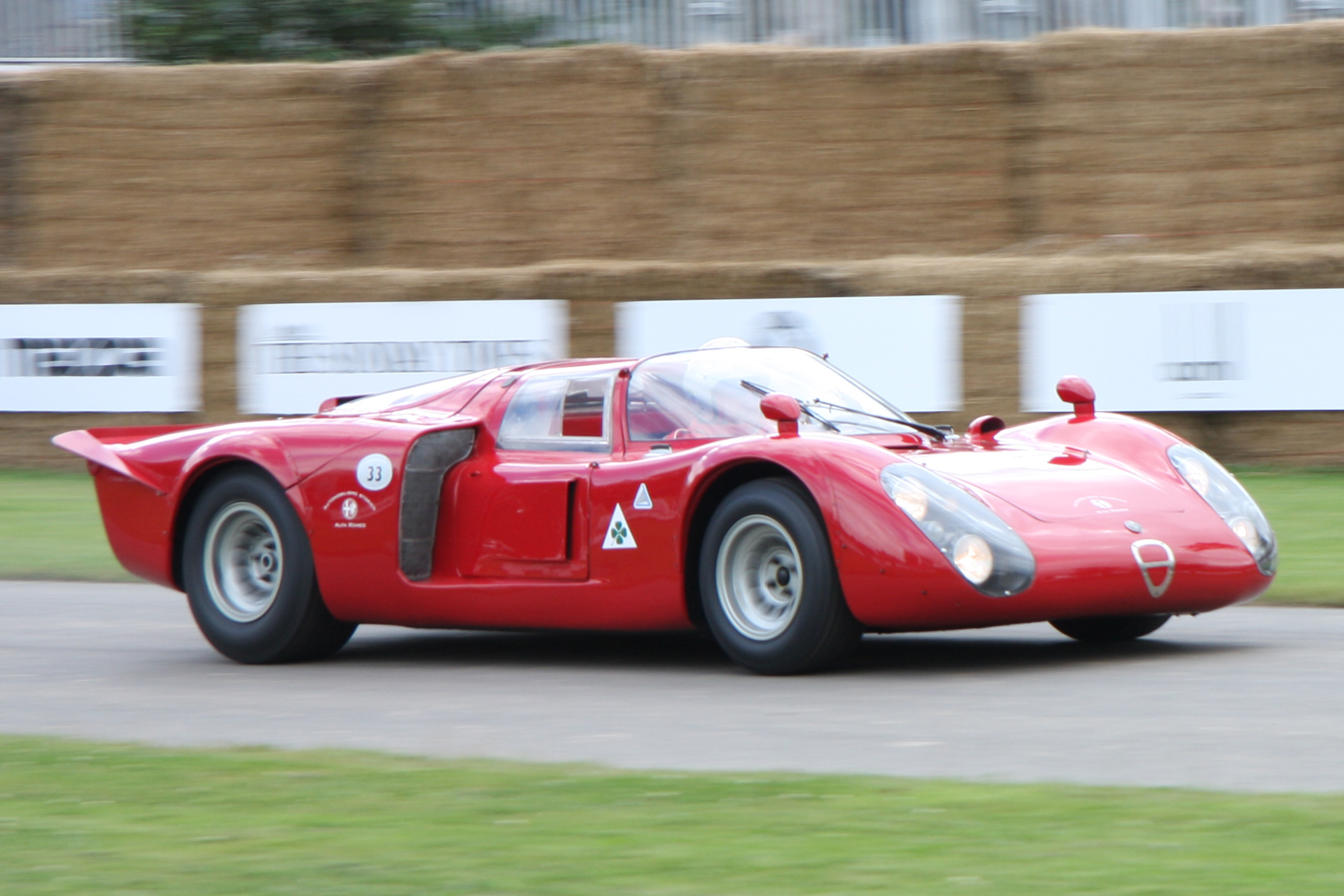

Overview
- Manufacturer: Alfa Romeo
- Production: 1967–1968
- Designer: Carlo Chiti

Body and chassis
- Class: Group 6 Prototype-Sports Cars; Group 4 Sports Cars
- Layout: Rear mid-engine, rear wheel drive

Powertrain
- Engine: 2.0 L (1,995 cc) 90° V8; 270 bhp @ 9,600 rpm 2.5 L (2,462 cc) 90° V8; 315 bhp @ 8,800 rpm
- Transmission: 6-speed manual

Dimensions
- Length: 3,960 mm (155.9 in)
- Width: 1,760 mm (69.3 in)
- Height: 950 mm (37.4 in)
- Curb weight: 2.0L – 580 kg (1,279 lb); 2.5L – 600 kg (1,323 lb)

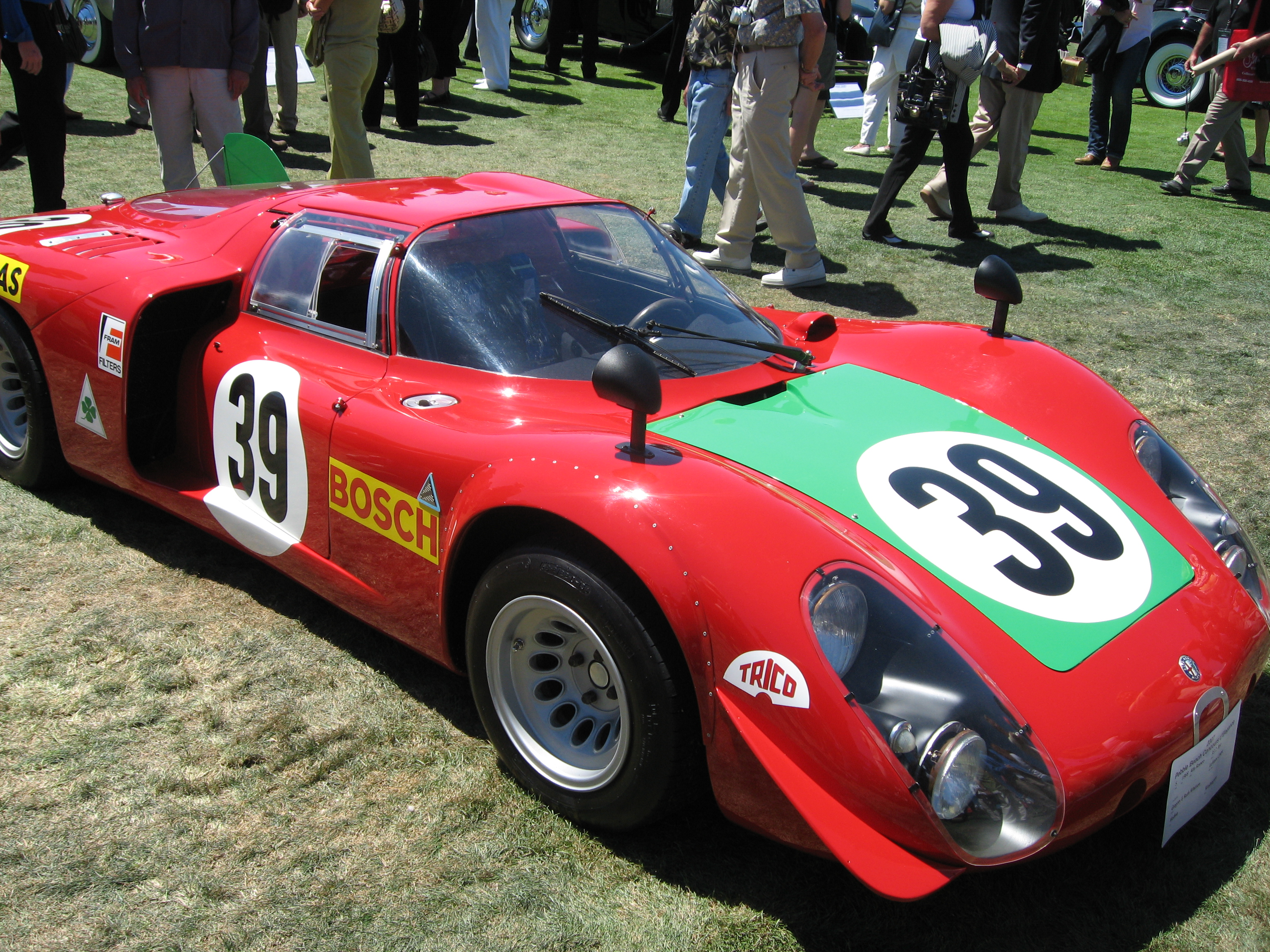
Alfa Romeo Tipo 33/2 Le Mans (1968)

In 1968, Alfa's subsidiary Autodelta developed an evolution model called T33/2. A road version, dubbed Alfa Romeo 33 Stradale, was also introduced. At the 24 Hours of Daytona, the Porsche 907 with 2.2L engines were dominating the overall race, but Alfa took the 2-litre class win, with Udo Schütz and Nino Vaccarella; after that the car was named "Daytona". The win was repeated at the Targa Florio, where Nanni Galli and Ignazio Giunti also took second place overall, followed by teammates Lucien Bianchi and Mario Casoni. Galli and Giunti then won the class at the Nürburgring 1000 km, where the 2.5 L (2,462 cc) V8 version (named the T33/2 Daytona 2.5 Litre) finished for the first time, fourth place in the 3.0 L class with Schütz and Bianchi. However, in most races, the Alfa drivers were outclassed by their Porsche rivals who used bigger engines. In 1968, the car was used mainly by privateers, winning its class in the 1000km Monza, Targa Florio and Nürburgring races. At the end of season Alfa Romeo had finished third in the 1968 International Championship for Makes.

A total of 28 cars were built during 1968, allowing the 33/2 to be homologated as a Group 4 Sports Car for 1969.

The 2.5 L (2,462 cc) V8 was also successful in Australian and International open wheel racing. Australian team Alec Mildren Racing, run by Australia's then official Alfa Romeo importer Alec Mildren who used his connections within the Autodelta to obtain the engines, ran the 315 bhp (235 kW; 319 PS) V8 in both his Brabham BT23E and the team's own Mildren Mono. Driver Kevin Bartlett won both the 1968 (Brabham) and 1969 (Mono) Australian Drivers' Championships using the 2.5L Tipo 33 V8 (in 1969 the Alfa V8 actually alternated CAMS Gold Star meetings with an Australian designed and built 2.0L 4 cylinder Waggott engine. The Alfa was used on the power circuits while the smaller Waggott was used on tighter tracks). Bartlett and Formula One driver Frank Gardner also drove the Alfa V8s in the 1968 and 1969 Tasman Series.

Bartlett used the Mildren Mono-Alfa Romeo to win the 1969 Macau Grand Prix run for Formula Libre cars. It was the first Italian engine to win at Macau and as of the 2024 race was the first of three wins for Alfa Romeo engines, the others being in 1988 and 2024.

== Alfa Romeo T33/3 ==
Alfa Romeo T33/3 Alfa Romeo 33TT3
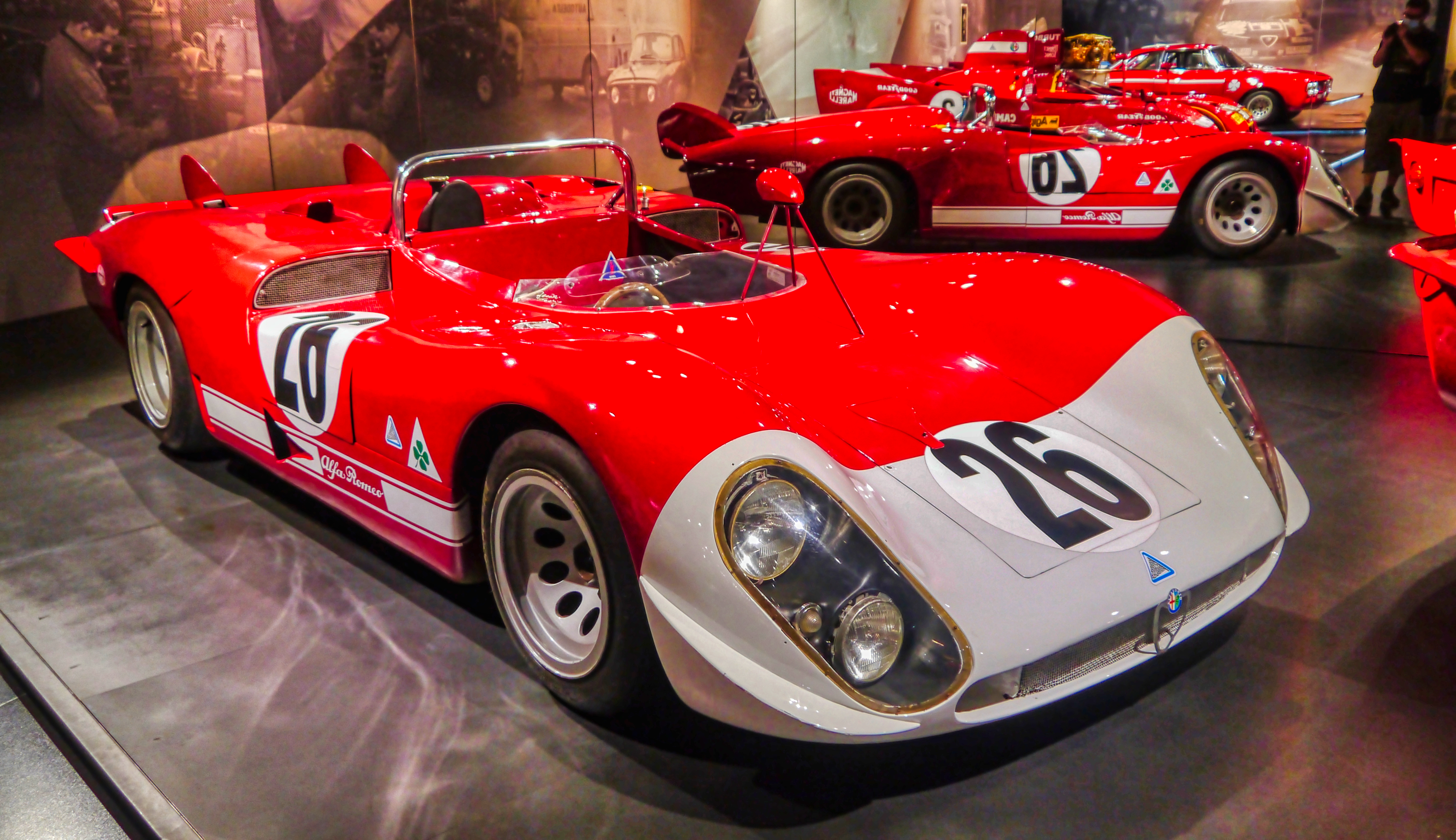
- 1970 Alfa Romeo Tipo 33/3 at the Museo Alfa Romeo

Overview
- Manufacturer: Alfa Romeo
- Also called: Alfa Romeo
- Production: 1967–1968 (T33/3); 1969–1972 (T33TT3)
- Designer: Autodelta

Body and chassis
- Class: Group 6 Prototype-Sports Cars; Group 5 Sports Cars
- Layout: RMR layout

Powertrain
- Engine: 3.0 L (2,998 cc) 90° V8; 420 bhp @ 9,000 rpm (T33/3); 440 bhp @ 9,800 rpm (T33TT3)
- Transmission: 5-speed manual 6-speed manual

Dimensions
- Curb weight: 650 kg (1,433 lb)

The Alfa Romeo T33/3 made its debut in 1969 at the 12 Hours of Sebring. The engine was enlarged to 2998 cc (183ci) with 400 hp (298 kW), which put the T33/3 in the same class as the Porsche 908 and the Ferrari 312P. The chassis was now a monocoque. The new car did poorly at Sebring and Alfa did not take part in Le Mans after Lucien Bianchi's death in a practice session. The car took a couple of wins in smaller competitions but overall the 1969 season was not a successful one, and Alfa Romeo was placed seventh in the 1969 International Championship for Makes.

In 1970 the bigger 5.0L Porsche 917 and Ferrari 512S dominated, yet Toine Hezemans and Masten Gregory took third overall at Sebring, and Andrea De Adamich and Henri Pescarolo won their class in the 1000km Zeltweg, finishing second overall. Also in 1970, an Alfa T33/3 was one of the "actors" of Steve McQueen's movie Le Mans, released in 1971.

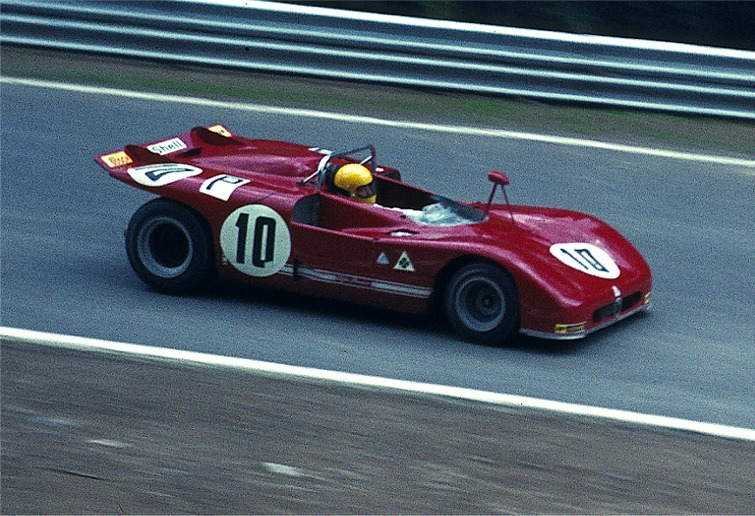
Revised Alfa Romeo T33/3 with Nanni Galli at the Nürburgring in 1971

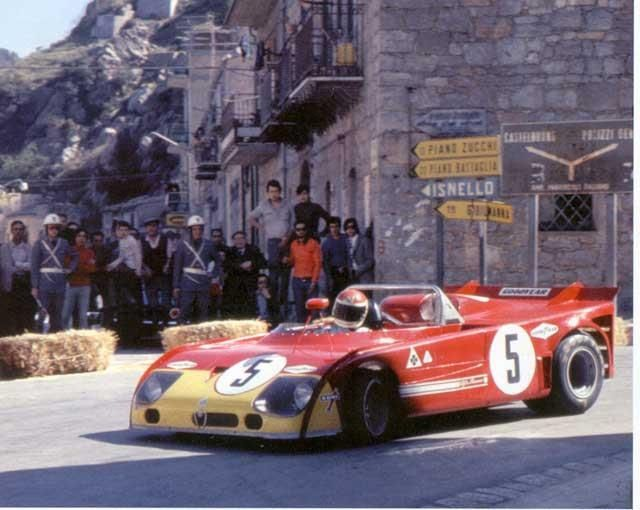
T33/3 at the 1972 Targa Florio. Driver is Helmut Marko.

In 1971 the Alfa Romeo racing effort was finally successful. Rolf Stommelen and Nanni Galli won their class at the 1000km Buenos Aires (followed by De Adamich and Pescarolo), before taking another class win (and second overall) at Sebring. De Adamich and Pescarolo later won outright at the 1000km Brands Hatch, a significant result against the "invincible" 917s. They then took a class win at Monza (where Alfa Romeo took the three podium slots in the prototype class) and another one at Spa. At the 1971 Targa Florio, the Porsches crashed out, and Vaccarella and Hezemans won outright, followed by teammates De Adamich and Gijs van Lennep. Hezemans and Vaccarella won their class at Zeltweg, and De Adamich and Ronnie Peterson won overall at Watkins Glen. Alfa Romeo finished the season second place in the championship. After 1971 the 5 litre Group 5 Sports Cars inclusion expired and the 3 litre cars of Alfa Romeo, Ferrari and Matra, redesignated as Group 5 Sports Cars, competed together for outright victories. The higher minimum weight negated the advantage of the underpowered aircooled Porsche 908/03, thus the factory sold them off to privateers.

== Alfa Romeo T33/4 ==
A 4-litre version was entered to 1972 and 1974 CanAm series by Otto Zipper, and the driver was Scooter Patrick. Autodelta was also one of entrants with T33/4 in season 1974. The T33/3 version was also used in the CanAm series earlier.

== Alfa Romeo T/33/TT/12 ==
Alfa Romeo T/33/TT/12
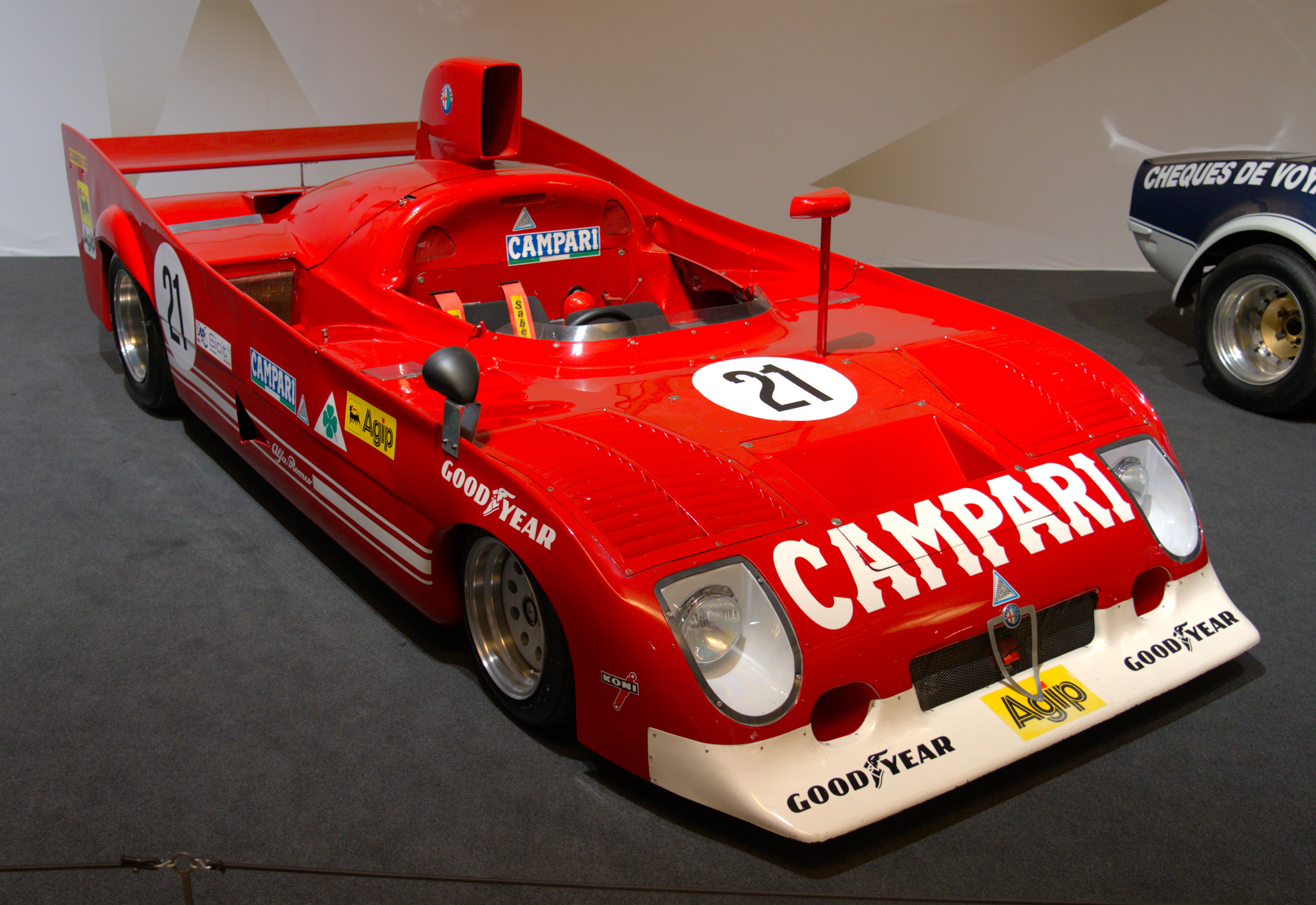
- 33TT12 at the Museo Alfa Romeo

Overview
- Manufacturer: Alfa Romeo
- Production: 1973–1976
- Designer: Autodelta

Body and chassis
- Class: Group 5 Sports Cars
- Layout: RMR layout

Powertrain
- Engine: 3.0 L (2,995.125 cc) cc F12; 470 bhp @ 11,000 rpm 500 bhp @ 11,500 rpm
- Transmission: 5-speed manual

Dimensions
- Curb weight: 670 kg (1477 lb)

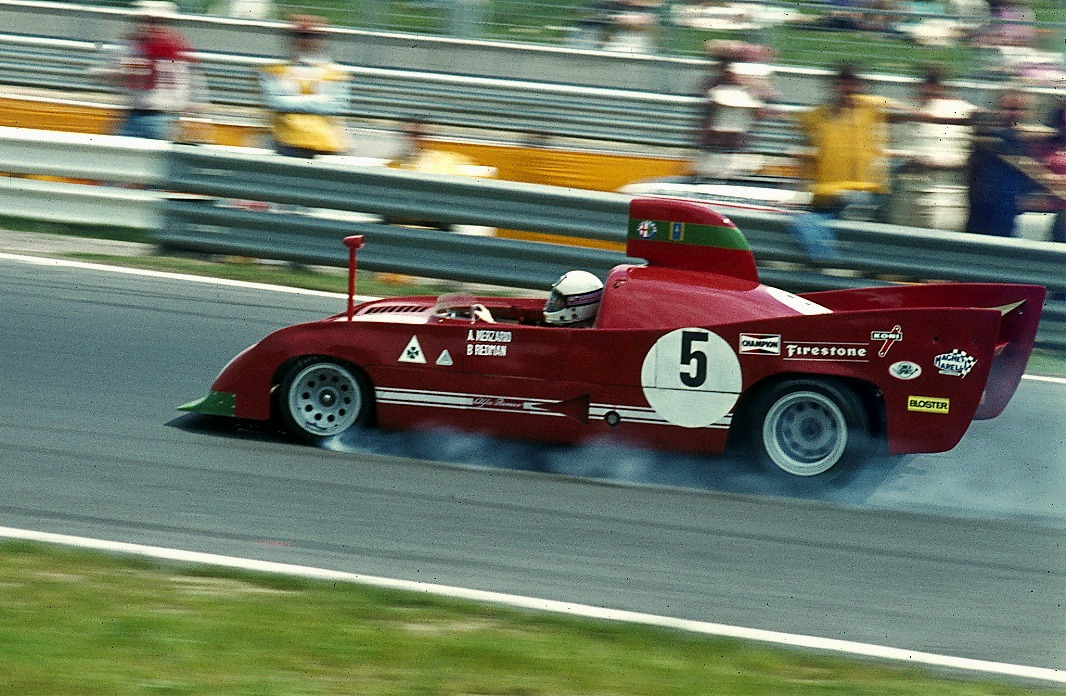
Brian Redman driving Alfa Romeo Tipo 33TT12 at the Nürburgring in 1974

The T/33/TT/12 (Telaio Tubolare, tubular spaceframe chassis) appeared in 1973 with the Carlo Chiti-designed 12 cylinder 3.0L flat engine (500 bhp). The flat-12 layout, called "boxer" by Ferrari, was used since 1970 in the Ferrari 312B F1, and since 1971 in the Ferrari 312PB in sportscars. Alfa went the other way, testing the F12 in sportscars, then supplying engines to power the Brabham BT45 in 1976. The Alfa flat-12 engine was later used on Brabham-Alfa BT46 fan car and Alfa Romeo 177 F1 cars.

The 1973 season, won by Matra ahead of Ferrari and private Porsches, was more or less development time. With Ferrari abandoning sportscars for the next 20 years, the 1974 season was again won by Matra. The Alfa now had an F1-style ram airbox intake added, won the Monza 1000km, and finished its three other races and the season with second places. In the 1975 season, Matra was out and the '75 24h Le Mans was not part of the championship.

After years of trying, Alfa Romeo won the 1975 World Championship for Makes when entered not by Autodelta, but by the Germany-based Willi Kauhsen Racing Team that skipped Daytona. At Mugello, turbo-powered sportscars scored their first successes after having appeared in 1974. Reduced to 2.14 litre capacity by a 1.4 turbo factor, a Renault-Alpine A441T won, and thanks to turbo power even an old Porsche 908 chassis was on the podium, beating the other Alfa. The rest of the season, that did not include Le Mans, was one of almost total domination with wins in all seven races. Winning drivers were: Arturo Merzario, Vittorio Brambilla, Jacques Laffite, Henri Pescarolo, Derek Bell and Jochen Mass.

For 1976 new rules were in effect, and both a Group 5 and Group 6 World Championship was contested, each won by turbo-powered Porsche 935 and Porsche 936. Autodelta was concentrating on F1 engines and other things, and the T33 was rarely used in competitions.

== Alfa Romeo 33SC12 ==
Alfa Romeo 33SC12 Alfa Romeo 33SC12 Turbo
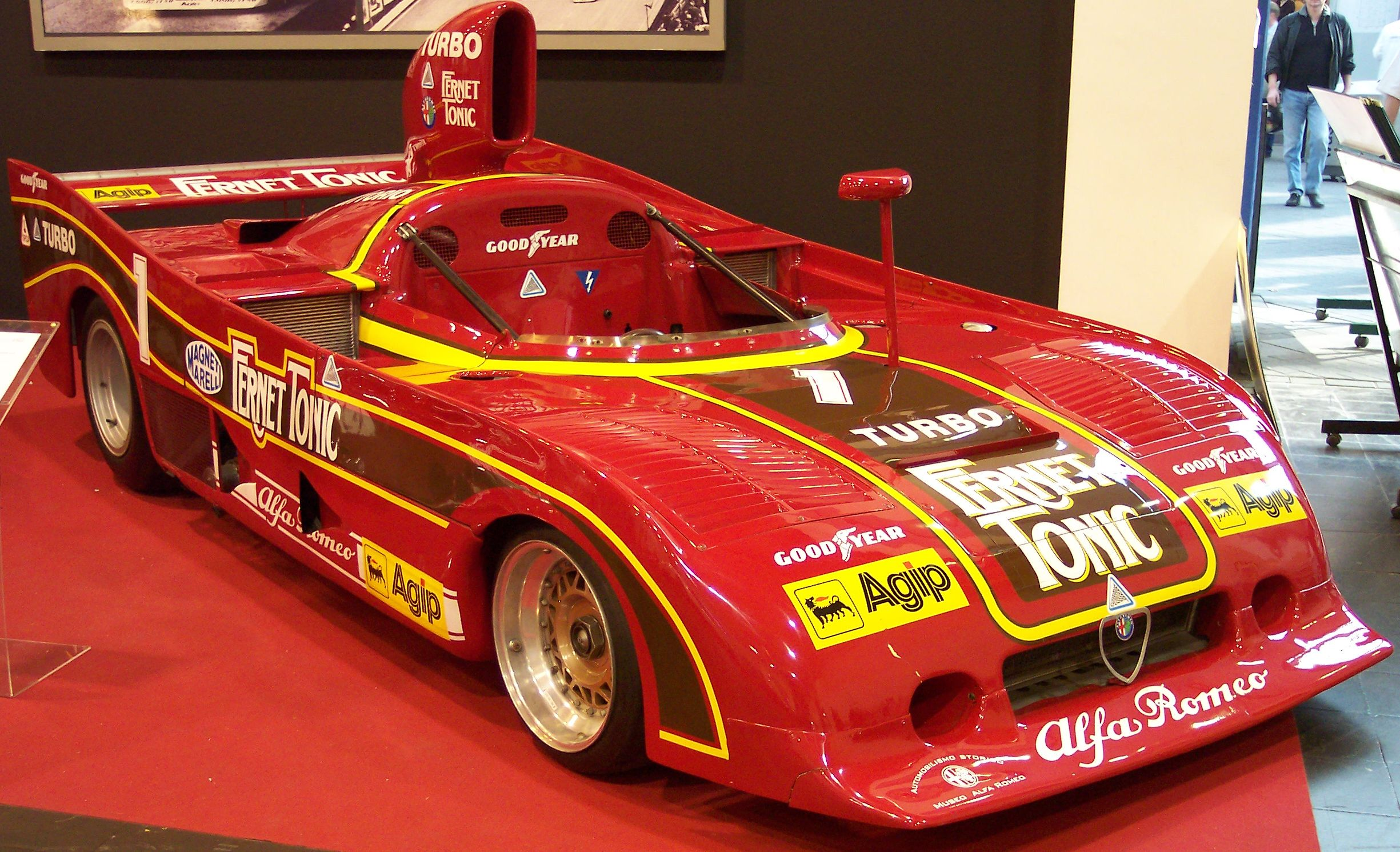
- Alfa Romeo 33 SC 12 Turbo

Overview
- Manufacturer: Alfa Romeo
- Production: 1976–1977
- Designer: Autodelta

Body and chassis
- Class: Group 6 Two-Seater Racing Cars
- Layout: RMR layout

Powertrain
- Engine: 3.0 L (2,995 cc) F12; 520 bhp @ 12,000 rpm 2.1 L (2,134 cc) F12 twin-turbo 640 bhp @ 11,000 rpm
- Transmission: 5-speed manual

Dimensions
- Curb weight: 770 kg (1,700 lb)

The successor of the 33TT12 1976 was the 33SC12, SC referring to SCatolato, a boxed chassis. The 3.0 L flat-12 engine now produced 520 bhp (390 kW). With this car Alfa Romeo won the 1977 World Championship for Sports Cars, the 33SC12s driven by Arturo Merzario, Jean-Pierre Jarier and Vittorio Brambilla having won every race in the series. At the Salzburgring the car reached an average speed of 203.82 km/h (126.6 mph).

Turbo cars had to reduced engine capacity by factor 1.4, thus 2.14 liter for the 3 liter calls. Porsche introduced the technology with the 1974 Carrera RSR turbo, the Alpine 441T took the first WSC turbo race win in 1975, the Porsche 936 in 1976 the first Le Mans 24h win and the first championship of a turbo. In 1977 the Porsche 935/77 was ungraded to a biturbo engine.

In the same Salzburgring race Arturo Merzario also tested a 2134 cc turbocharged SC12 producing 640 bhp finishing second with that car. The SC12 Turbo was Alfa's first twin turbocharged 12 cylinder engine and it was introduced around the same time as the Renault RS01 Formula One turbo engine. In the Alfa Romeo engine each bank was fed with its own turbocharger; that feature was adopted by many racecar makers in the following years.

== Technical data ==
Technical data	33/2	33/2 Daytona 2.5 Litre	33/3	33TT3	33TT12	33SC12
Engine:	8-cylinder 90° V-engine				12-cylinder 180° V-engine	12-cylinder 180° V-engine with twin turbo
Displacement:	2.0 L (1,995 cc)	2.5 L (2,462 cc)	3.0 L (2,993 cc)		3.0 L (2,995 cc)	2.1 L (2,134 cc)
Bore x stroke:	78 x 52.2 mm		86 x 64.4 mm		77 x 53.6 mm	77 x 38.2 mm
Compression:	11.0:1				12.0:1
Max power at rpm:	270 hp at 9,600 rpm	315 hp at 8,800 rpm	420 hp at 9,400 rpm	440 hp at 9,800 rpm	520 hp at 11,500 rpm	640 hp at 11,000 rpm
Max torque at rpm:		470 Nm at 7,000 rpm				480 Nm at 9,000 rpm
Ignition system	Twin Spark
Valve control:	DOHC per cylinder bank, 2 valves per cylinder		DOHC per cylinder bank, 4 valves per cylinder
Fuel system:	Lucas Fuel Injection
Gearbox:	6-speed manual			5-speed manual
front suspension:	Double wishbones, coil springs, telescopic dampers, anti-roll bars
Rear suspension	Lower wishbones, coil springs, telescopic dampers, anti-roll bars			Double transverse links, single longitudinal links, coil springs, anti-roll bars
Brakes:	4-wheel, hydraulic, ventilated, disc brakes
Chassis & body:	Aluminium tubular chassis with aluminium body		Self-supporting monocoque	Fackverksteel frame with aluminum body		Self-supporting monocoque
Wheelbase:	225 cm		224 cm		234 cm	250 cm
Dry weight	580 kg (1,280 lb)	600 kg (1,300 lb)	700 kg (1,500 lb)	650 kg (1,430 lb)	670 kg (1,480 lb)	770 kg (1,700 lb)
Top speed	260 km/h (161.56 mph)	300 km/h (186.41 mph)	310 km/h (192.63 mph)	330 km/h (205.05 mph)		352 km/h (218.72 mph)

== Audio ==
Alfa Romeo Tipo 33 at Goodwood Festival of Speed 2010
1966 Alfa Romeo Tipo 33 Periscopica

1968 Alfa Romeo Tipo 33 2 Daytona

1968 Alfa Romeo Tipo 33 2 Le Mans
