= 1962 Australian Formula Junior Championship =

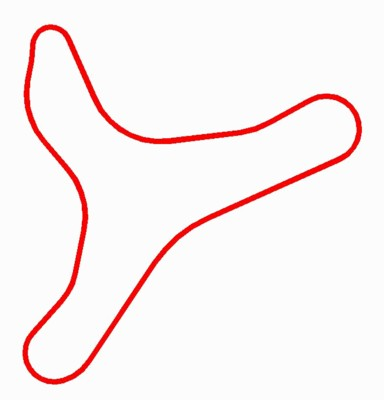
Layout of the Catalina Park (1961-2001)

The 1962 Australian Formula Junior Championship was a CAMS sanctioned motor racing title open to Formula Junior racing cars. The championship was contested over a single 30 lap, 60 km race, staged at the Catalina Park circuit at Katoomba in New South Wales, Australia on 28 October 1962. The title, which was the inaugural Australian Formula Junior Championship, was won by Frank Matich, driving an Australian built Elfin.

== Results ==
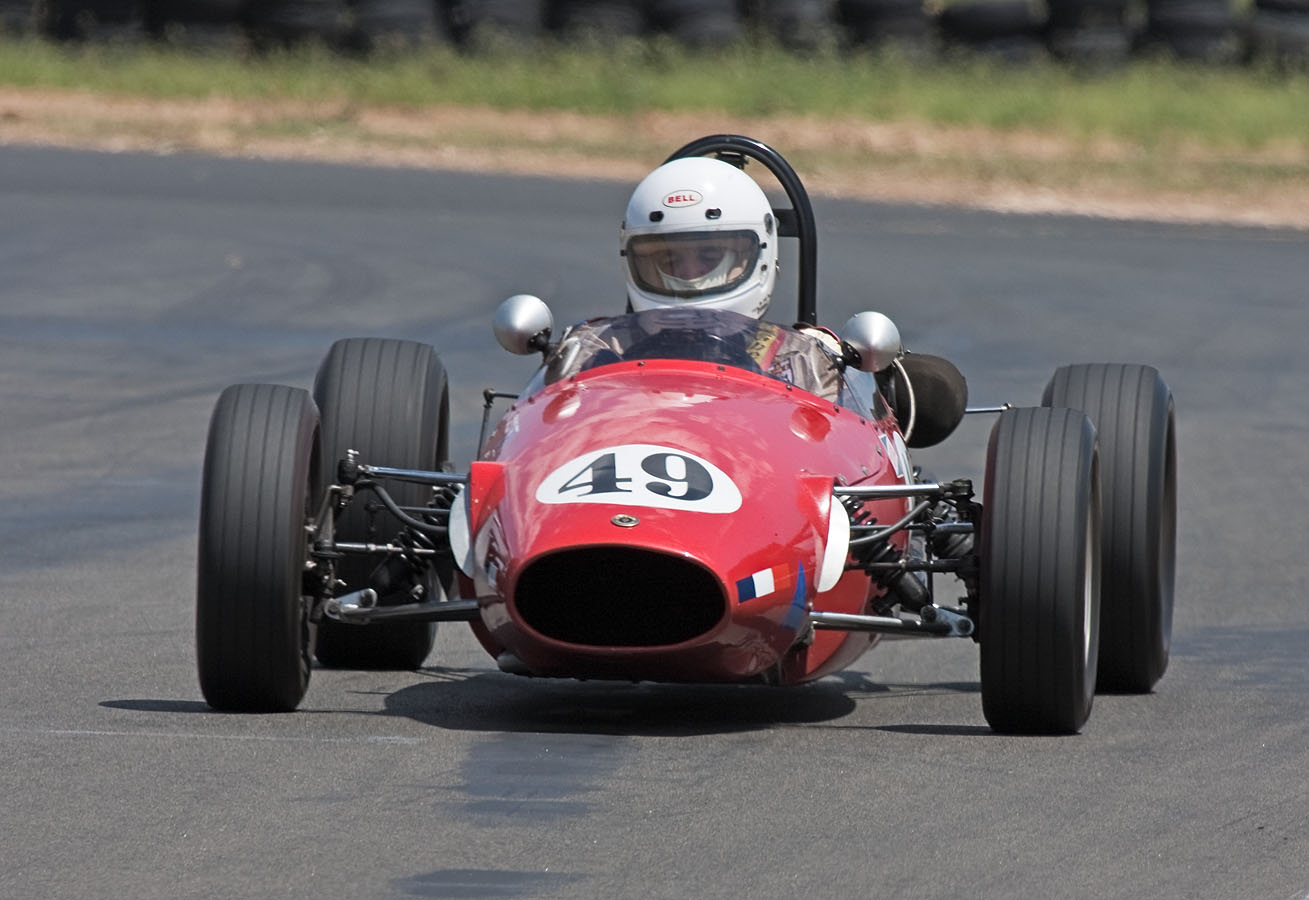
An Elfin FJ similar to the car in which Frank Matich won the 1962 Australian Formula Junior Championship

Position	Driver	No.	Car	Entrant	Laps
1	Frank Matich	4	Elfin FJ Ford Cosworth	F Matich	30
2	Gavin Youl	2	Repco Brabham Holbay Ford	Scuderia Veloce	30
3	Leo Geoghegan	8	Lotus 22 Ford Cosworth	Geoghegan Motors Liverpool	30
4	Glyn Scott	20	Lotus 20 Ford Cosworth	GA Scott Qld	30
5	Clive Nolan	16	Lotus 20 Ford	Clive Nolan Motors	29
6	Lionel Ayers	15	Lotus 20 Ford Cosworth	Motor Racing Components	27
DNF	Wally Mitchell	9	MRD	Wally Mitchell	13

Race facts:

- Fastest in practice: Frank Matich, Elfin FJ, 1:01.7
- Starters: Seven
- Winner's race time: 31:18.7
- Fastest race lap: Frank Matich, Elfin FJ, 1:01.1, (New Formula Junior lap record)

== See also ==
- 1962 Keens Mustard Trophy Series
