= 1975 World Sportscar Championship =

Racing tournament

Seasons
- ← 1974 1976 (WCM); 1976 (WSC) →

The 1975 World Sportscar Championship season was the 23rd season of FIA World Sportscar Championship motor racing. It featured the 1975 World Championship for Makes which was open to Group 5 Sports Cars and Group 4 Special GT Cars. It also included the FIA Cup for GT Cars and the FIA Cup for 2-Litre Cars. The three titles were contested concurrently over a nine race series which ran from 1 February to 12 July 1975.

== Schedule ==
The 1975 24 Hours of Le Mans was not part of the Championship as the ACO rule makers required better fuel economy in the wake of the 1973 oil crisis.

Rnd	Race	Circuit or Location	Date
1	(United States) 24 Hours of Daytona^{†}	Daytona International Speedway	1 February; 2 February
2	(Italy) 1000 km of Mugello	Mugello Circuit	23 March
3	(France) 800 km of Dijon	Dijon-Prenois	6 April
4	(Italy) Trofeo Filippo Caracciolo (1000km)	Autodromo Nazionale Monza	20 April
5	(Belgium) 1000km Spa	Circuit de Spa-Francorchamps	4 May
6	(Italy) Coppa Florio (1000 km)	Autodromo di Pergusa	18 May
7	(Germany) 1000km Nürburgring	Nürburgring	1 June
8	(Austria) 1000km Zeltweg	Österreichring	29 June
9	(United States) Watkins Glen 6 Hours	Watkins Glen International	12 July

† Due to a lack of Group 5 entries, the FIA initially rescinded the championship status of the Daytona race. Several months after the event the FIA retroactively conferred championship status to the race and placed cars into the classes they would theoretically have entered.

== Season results ==
=== Races ===
Rnd	Circuit	Winning team	GT Winning Team	2-Litre Winning Team	Results
Rnd	Circuit	Winning drivers	GT Winning Drivers	2-Litre Winning Drivers	Results
1	Daytona	(United States) #59 Brumos Porsche	(United States) #71 North American Racing Team	None	Results
1	Daytona	(United States) Hurley Haywood (United States) Peter Gregg	(United States) Jon Woodner (United States) Fred Phillips		Results
2	Mugello	(France) #5 Elf Alpine-Renault	(Germany) #44 Gelo Racing Team	#24 KVG Racing	Results
2	Mugello	(France) Jean-Pierre Jabouille (France) Gérard Larrousse	(United Kingdom) John Fitzpatrick (Netherlands) Toine Hezemans (Liechtenstein) Manfred Schurti	(United Kingdom) John Hine (United Kingdom) Ian Grob	Results
3	Dijon-Prenois	(Germany) #2 Willi Kauhsen Racing Team	(Germany) #33 Gelo Racing Team	#18 KVG Racing	Results
3	Dijon-Prenois	(Italy) Arturo Merzario (France) Jacques Laffite	(United Kingdom) John Fitzpatrick (Netherlands) Toine Hezemans	(United Kingdom) Ian Grob (United Kingdom) John Hine	Results
4	Monza	(Germany) #2 Willi Kauhsen Racing Team	None	#15 Eqipe Elf Switzerland	Results
4	Monza	(Italy) Arturo Merzario (France) Jacques Laffite		(Italy) Lella Lombardi (France) Marie-Claude Beaumont	Results
5	Spa-Francorchamps	(Germany) #2 Willi Kauhsen Racing Team	(Switzerland) #42 Porsche Club Romand	(United Kingdom) #34 Peter Smith	Results
5	Spa-Francorchamps	(France) Henri Pescarolo (United Kingdom) Derek Bell	(Switzerland) Claude Haldi (France) Bernard Béguin	(United Kingdom) Peter Smith (United Kingdom) John Turner	Results
6	Pergusa	(Germany) #1 Willi Kauhsen Racing Team	(Germany) #48 Tebernum Porsche Racing	#27 Scuderia Citta dei Mille	Results
6	Pergusa	(Italy) Arturo Merzario (Germany) Jochen Mass	(Germany) Hartwig Bertrams (Germany) Clemens Schickentanz (Sweden) Reine Wisell	(Italy) Giancarlo Gagliardi (Italy) "Bramen"	Results
7	Nürburgring	(Germany) #1 Willi Kauhsen Racing Team	(Germany) #54 Jägermeister Kremer Racing	#30 March-Hart Racing	Results
7	Nürburgring	(Italy) Arturo Merzario (France) Jacques Laffite	(Germany) Helmut Kelleners (Germany) Hans Heyer (France) Bob Wollek	(United Kingdom) David Morgan (United Kingdom) John Lepp (Australia) Vern Schuppan	Results
8	Österreichring	(Germany) #2 Willi Kauhsen Racing Team	None	#29 March Racing	Results
8	Österreichring	(France) Henri Pescarolo (United Kingdom) Derek Bell		(United Kingdom) David Morgan (United Kingdom) John Lepp	Results
9	Watkins Glen	(Germany) #4 Willi Kauhsen Racing Team	(United States) #95 Bob Hagestad Porsche-Audi	None	Results
9	Watkins Glen	(France) Henri Pescarolo (United Kingdom) Derek Bell	(United States) Bob Hagestad (United States) Hurley Haywood		Results

=== World Championship for Makes ===
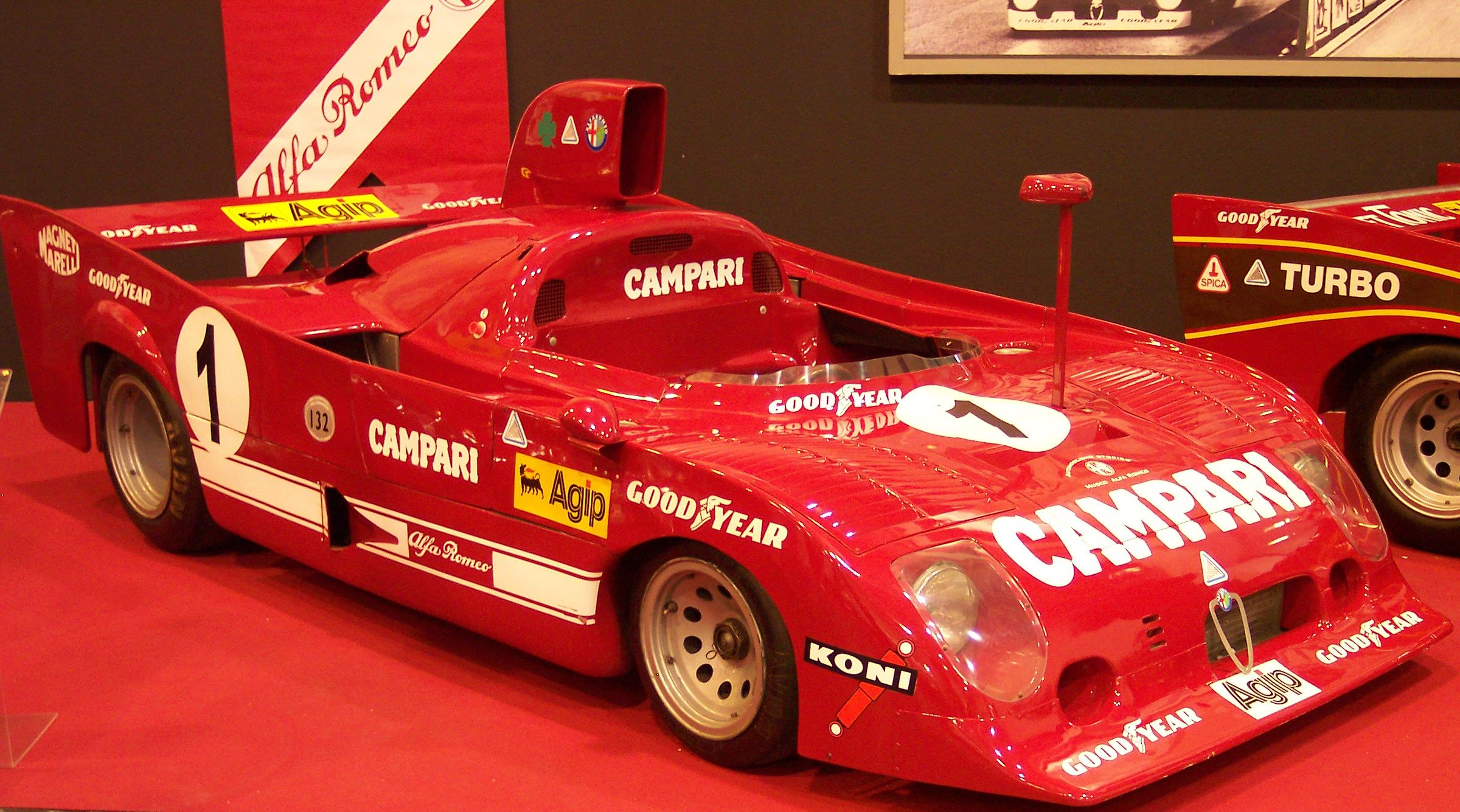
Alfa Romeo won the 1975 World Championship for Makes with the Alfa Romeo 33TT12

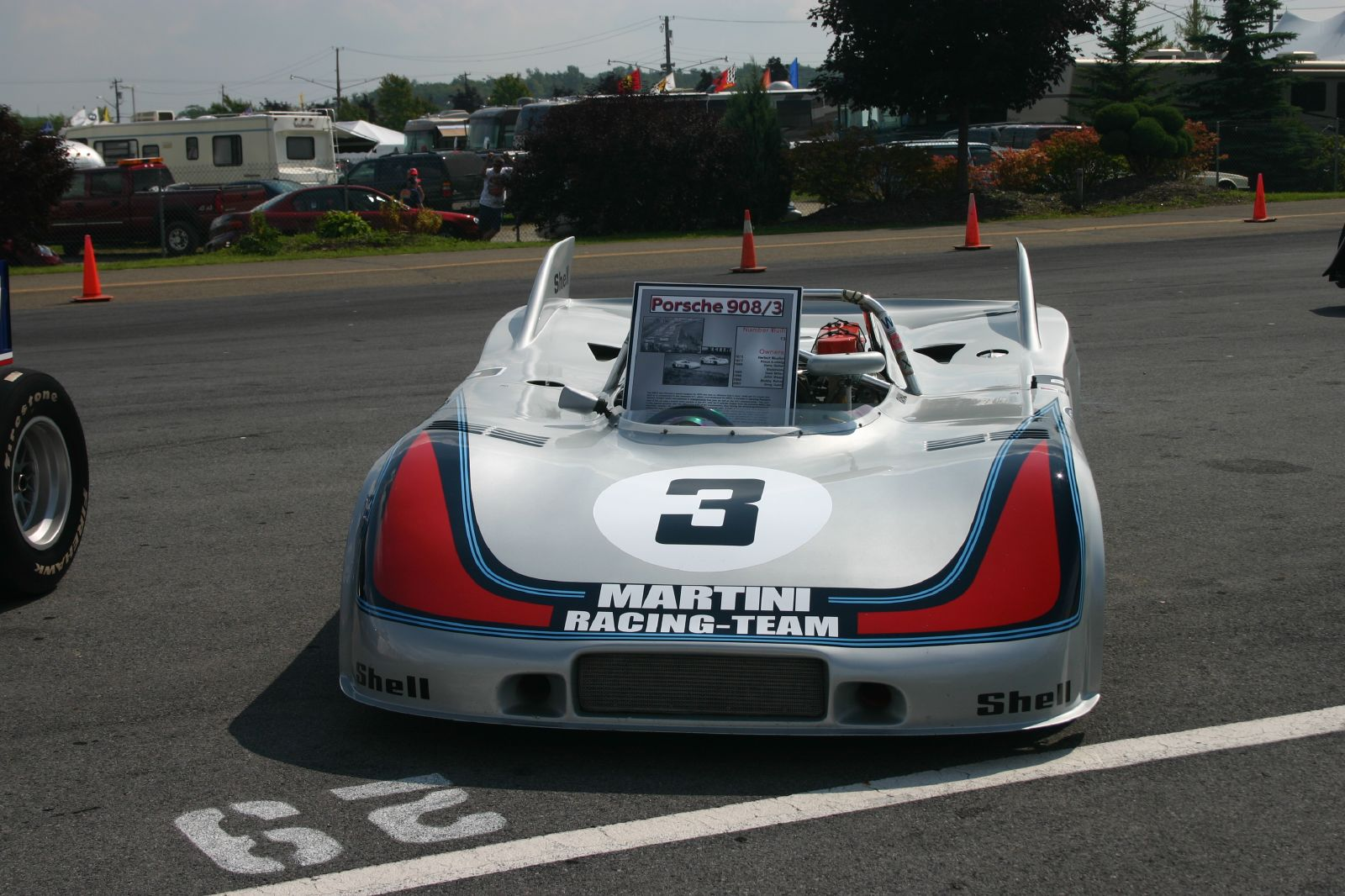
Porsche placed second in the championship with the 911 Carrera RSR and 908/3 (pictured).

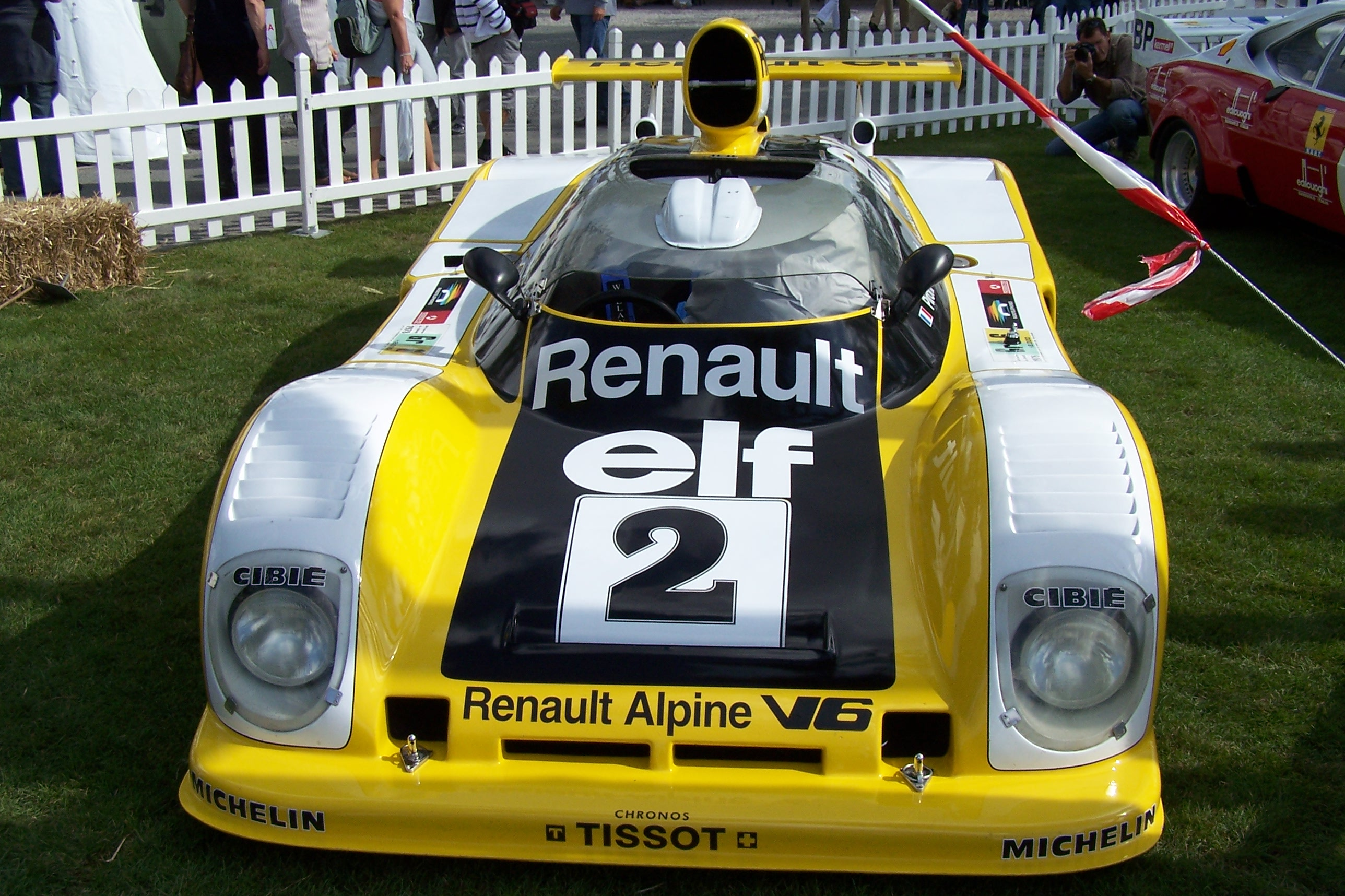
Alpine Renault placed third in the championship with the A441 & A442 (pictured).

Points towards the World Championship for Makes were awarded to the top 10 positions in each race in the order of 20-15-12-10-8-6-4-3-2-1. Points were awarded to the position gained by the highest placed car from each make with any positions filled by other cars from the same make not attracting points. No points were awarded to positions gained by cars other than Group 5 Sports Cars and Group 4 Special GT Cars.

Only the 7 best results were retained for championship classification. Discarded points are shown (below) within brackets

Pos.	Make	Rd 1	Rd 2	Rd 3	Rd 4	Rd 5	Rd 6	Rd 7	Rd 8	Rd 9	Total
1	(Italy) Alfa Romeo		(15)	20	20	20	20	20	20	20	140
2	(Germany) Porsche	20	12	15	15	12	12	12	(12)	(10)	98
3	(France) Alpine-Renault		20		12			10		12	54
4	(United Kingdom) Chevron		8	12	3	2	6	1	4		36
5	(United Kingdom) Mirage							15			15
6	(United Kingdom) March							4	8		12
7	(France) Ligier		4	6							10
	(United Kingdom) Lola			1			3		6		10
9	(Italy) Ferrari	4									4
10	(United States) Chevrolet									3	3

=== FIA Cup for GT Cars ===
Pos.	Make	Rd 1	Rd 2	Rd 3	Rd 4	Rd 5	Rd 6	Rd 7	Rd 8	Rd 9	Total
1	(Germany) Porsche	15	20	20		20	20	20		20	135
2	(Italy) Ferrari	20									20
3	(United States) Chevrolet	8								10	18
4	(Italy) De Tomaso		8								8
5	(Japan) Datsun	3									3

=== FIA Cup for 2-Litre Cars ===
Pos.	Make	Rd 1	Rd 2	Rd 3	Rd 4	Rd 5	Rd 6	Rd 7	Rd 8	Rd 9	Total
1	(United Kingdom) Chevron		20	20	15	20	20	20	15		130
2	(United Kingdom) Lola			15			15		20		50
3	(France) Alpine		15	12	20						47
