= Kauhsen =

Formula One team

- Full name: Willi Kauhsen Racing Team
- Base: Eschweiler, Germany
- Founder(s): Willi Kauhsen
- Noted staff: Klaus Kapitza
- Noted drivers: (Italy) Gianfranco Brancatelli

Formula One World Championship career
- First entry: 1979 Spanish Grand Prix
- Races entered: 2
- Constructors' Championships: 0
- Drivers' Championships: 0
- Race victories: 0
- Pole positions: 0
- Fastest laps: 0
- Final entry: 1979 Belgian Grand Prix

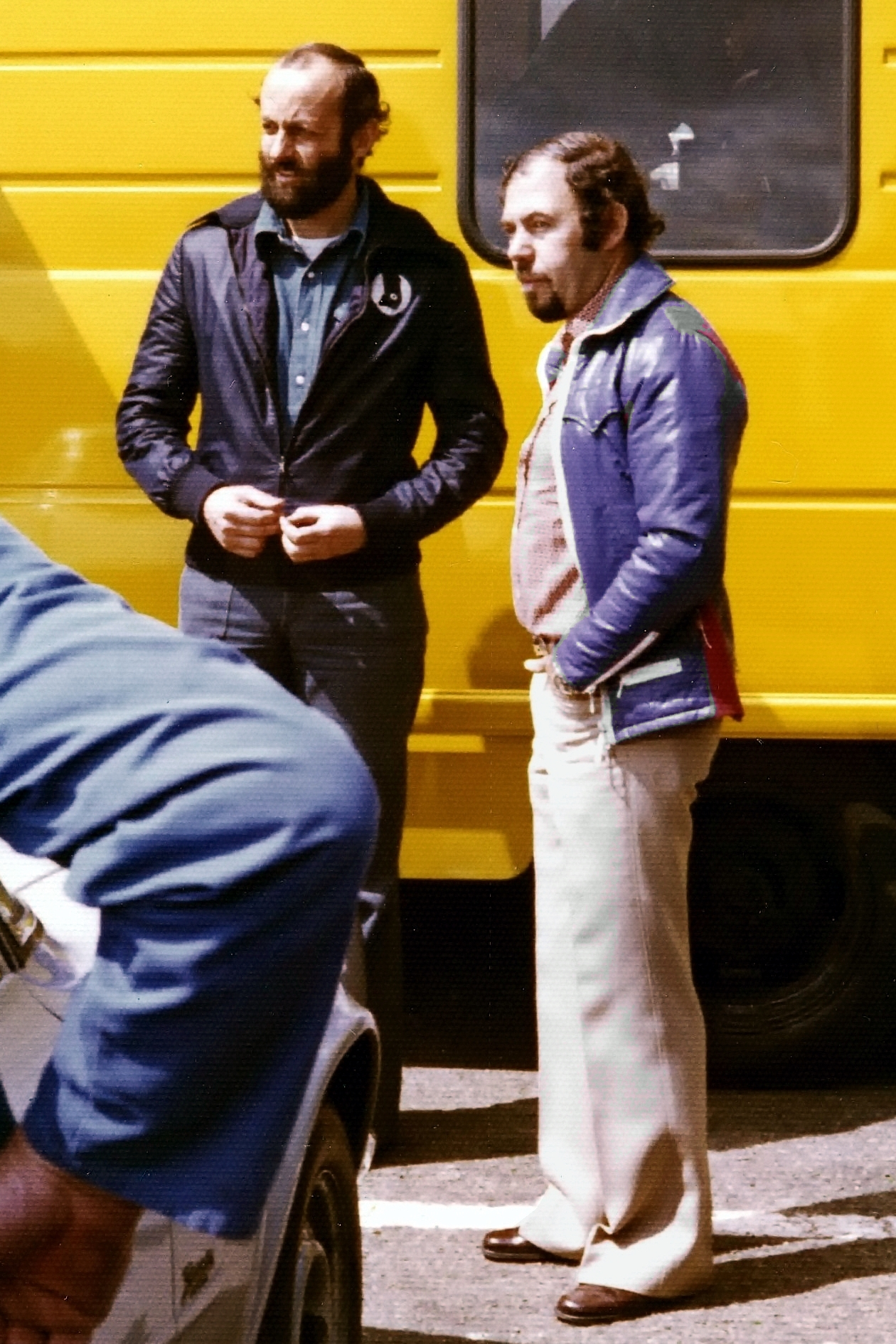
Willi Kauhsen on the right, Henri Pescarolo on the left, at Circuit de Spa-Francorchamps in Belgium in 1975

Kauhsen was a Formula One constructor from Germany, founded by former sportscar driver Willi Kauhsen. After having won the Interserie and the World Sportscar Championship with Alfa Romeo in 1975, the team started in Formula Two in 1976, purchasing Renault cars, and raced with an assortment of drivers with limited success. Kauhsen then entered the 1979 Formula One season, spending 1978 designing their own chassis with Cosworth engines. They participated in two World Championship Grands Prix with Gianfranco Brancatelli, failing to qualify on both occasions, before the team was shut down.

== Formula Two ==
Willi Kauhsen, who had raced Porsches and quasi-works Alfa Romeo sports cars, founded his racing team in Formula Two in 1976, buying the championship-winning Elf-Renault 2J Formula Two cars. The cars, driven by Michel Leclère and Klaus Ludwig, were renamed to Kauhsen-Renaults and initially started successfully, with Leclère taking pole at the first race of the 1977 Formula Two championship at Silverstone. Continued modifications to the chassis by Kauhsen however led to downturns in performance, and the car's original performance turned to successive failures to qualify; the poor results making Ludwig leave the squad mid-season. The second seat was then rotated between José Dolhem, Vittorio Brambilla and Alain Prost for the remainder of the season. Brambilla achieved a third place in the second heat at the Misano Circuit, which was the team's best result in the Formula Two championship. Subsequent races saw a best result of 10th for Prost, and with successive retirements and failures to qualify Kauhsen gave up on the championship before the final races.

== Formula One ==
Although unsuccessful in Formula Two, Kauhsen decided to enter Formula One in 1979, and after failing to secure a deal to run the Kojima cars used in the 1977 Japanese Grand Prix, Kauhsen spent 1978 designing their own chassis. Bringing in designer Klaus Kapitza from Ford, Kauhsen planned to construct a copy of the Lotus 79, a car that had dominated the 1978 championship due to the use of ground effects. Apart from the chassis, Kauhsen bought the rest of the components from suppliers, including the Cosworth DFV engine utilised by the majority of the teams at the time, and an outdated five-speed gearbox from Hewland. Having planned to follow the then-advanced use of ground effects by Lotus, initial testing of the prototype revealed fundamental design issues; the designers failed to take account of the variable ride height of cars during braking and acceleration, stopping the ground effects functioning correctly. These problems forced the team to redesign the entire car, bringing in drivers Patrick Nève and Harald Ertl to develop a new car with the limited funds available in the months before the Formula One season was to begin.

The problems in getting working ground effects on the chassis led to the team abandoning the concept, and returning to the older "wing car" that had been in prevalence before. These redesigns drained the team of funds; Kauhsen struggled to pay the entry fee for the championship, and only managed to acquire older tyres from Goodyear. After obtaining some sponsorship, and signing Italian driver Gianfranco Brancatelli, the Kauhsen WK004 made its début appearance at the first race of the 1979 British Formula One season in Zolder, albeit retiring early in the race due to engine issues. Kauhsen's first World Championship appearance was at the Spanish Grand Prix, using another redesigned car. Brancatelli failed to qualify for the race, being the slowest out of the 27 entries, the closest competitor being three seconds quicker. Running an updated car at the next race in Belgium, Brancatelli again failed to qualify, with a broken clutch preventing an improvement in pace. After the two successive failures, and a lack of funds, Willi Kauhsen withdrew from Formula One and closed the team.

The team's assets were purchased by Arturo Merzario, and was merged with his own eponymous Merzario team, which had been having a similar lack of success with the A2 chassis. The Kauhsen WK was used as the basis for the Giampaolo Dallara designed Merzario A4 car, but this did not improve from the performance of either of the cars, failing to qualify at the remaining World Championship rounds. The A4's only racing appearance was at the non-championship Dino Ferrari Grand Prix, finishing in 11th place. Merzario later left Formula One at the end of 1979, and moved to the Formula Two championship.

== Complete European Formula Two results ==
(key) (Results in bold indicate pole position; results in italics indicate fastest lap.)

Year	Chassis	Engine(s)	Drivers	1	2	3	4	5	6	7	8	9	10	11	12	13
1976	March 762	Hart; BMW		HOC	THR	VAL	SAL	PAU	HOC	ROU	MUG	PER	EST	NOG	HOC	
1976	March 762	Hart; BMW	(Brazil) Ingo Hoffmann	Ret	5	Ret	Ret	DNS		6	8	DNQ		DNQ	8	
1976	March 762	Hart; BMW	(Germany) Jochen Mass						Ret							
1976	March 762	Hart; BMW	(Germany) Klaus Ludwig	Ret		13		5	9		9			5	10	
1976	March 762	Hart; BMW	(Italy) Arturo Merzario									DNS				
1977	Jabouille 2J	Renault		SIL	THR	HOC	NÜR	VAL	PAU	MUG	ROU	NOG	PER	MIS	EST	DON
1977	Jabouille 2J	Renault	(France) Michel Leclère	**Ret**	Ret	Ret	DNS	Ret	Ret	DNS	DNQ	15		DNQ	10	
1977	Jabouille 2J	Renault	(Germany) Klaus Ludwig	Ret	Ret	Ret	9	DSQ	7							
1977	Jabouille 2J	Renault	(France) José Dolhem								Ret					
1977	Jabouille 2J	Renault	(France) Alain Prost											10		
1977	Jabouille 2J	Renault	(Italy) Vittorio Brambilla											Ret		
1977	Jabouille 2J	Renault	(Portugal) Mario da Silva												DNQ	

== Complete Formula One World Championship results ==
(key)

Year	Chassis	Engine	Tyres	Drivers	No.	1	2	3	4	5	6	7	8	9	10	11	12	13	14	15	Points	WCC
1979	WK	Ford Cosworth DFV 3.0 V8	G			ARG	BRA	RSA	USW	ESP	BEL	MON	FRA	GBR	GER	AUT	NED	ITA	CAN	USA	0	NC
1979	WK	Ford Cosworth DFV 3.0 V8	G	Gianfranco Brancatelli	36					DNQ	DNQ										0	NC
