= Leo Geoghegan =

Australian racing driver

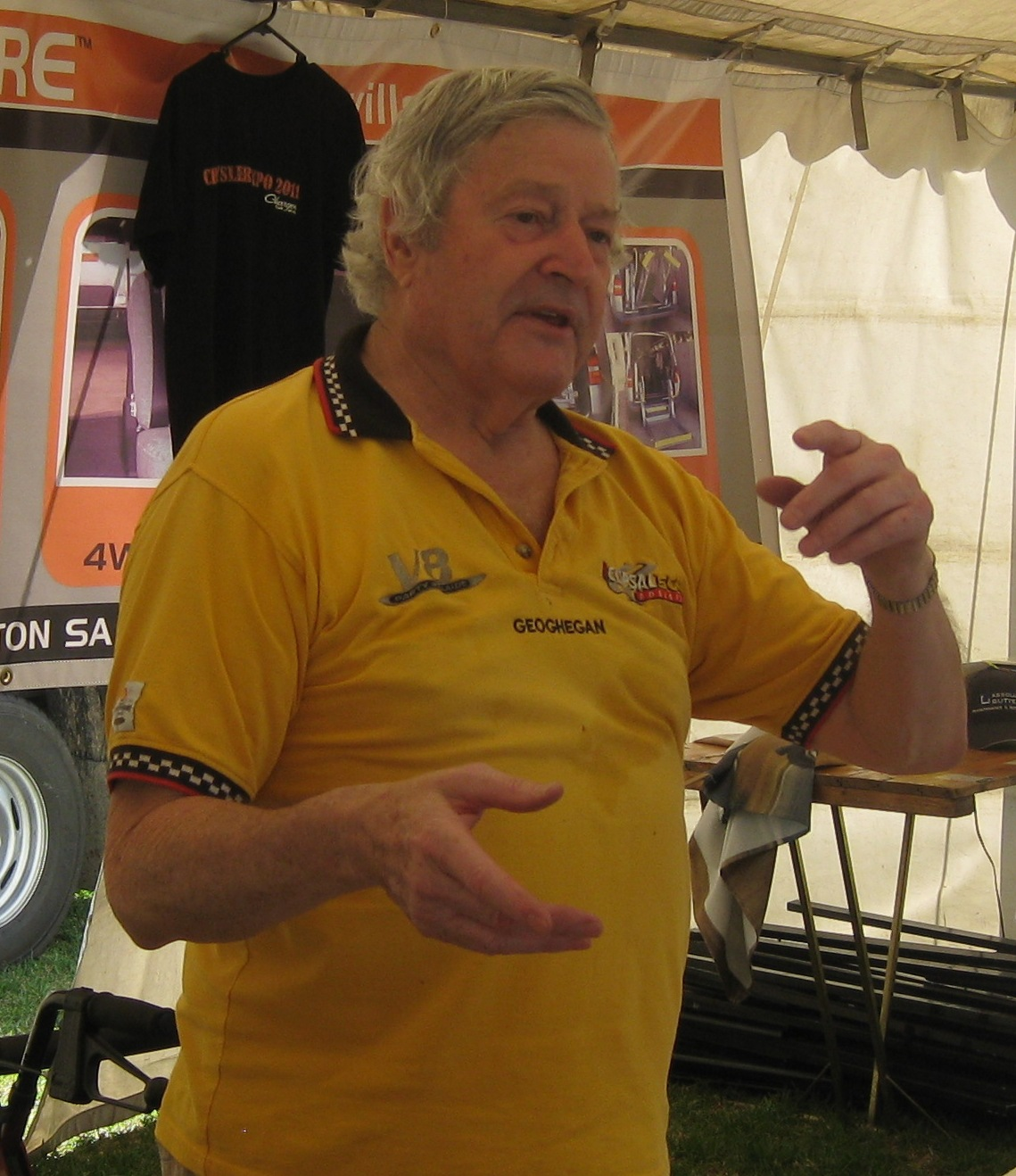
- Leo Geoghegan in 2011
- Nationality: Australian
- Born: Leo Francis Geoghegan; 16 May 1936 Sydney, New South Wales, Australia
- Died: 2 March 2015 (aged 78) Sydney, New South Wales
- Retired: 1974
- Relatives: Tom Geoghegan (father); Ian Geoghegan (brother)

Australian Drivers' Championship
- Years active: 1963–1973
- Teams: Geoghegan's Sporty Cars; Total Team
- Best finish: 1st in 1970

Previous series
- 1960 1962–1963 1965–1971 1965 1973–1974: Australian GT Championship; Australian Formula Junior Ch. Tasman Series; Australian 1½ Litre Champ. Australian Formula 2 Champ.

Championship titles
- 1960 1963 1970 1973 1974: Australian GT Championship; Australian Formula Junior Ch. Australian Drivers' Champ. Australian Formula 2 Champ. Australian Formula 2 Champ.

Leo Francis Geoghegan (16 May 1936 – 2 March 2015) was an Australian racing driver. He was the elder of two sons of former New South Wales car dealer Tom Geoghegan, both of whom become dominant names in Australian motor racing in the 1960s. While his younger brother Ian "Pete" Geoghegan had much of his success in touring car racing, winning five Australian Touring Car Championships, Leo spent most of his racing career in open wheel racing cars.

== Career ==
Geoghegan also drove Group E Series Production Cars and Group C touring cars at the annual Bathurst 500/1000 endurance race for the Ford Works Team, Chrysler Australia and the Holden Dealer Team. This gave him the distinction of being the only driver to race for all three Australian factory backed teams.

Leo and Ian Geoghegan drove their Ford Cortina Mk.I GT500 in the 1965 Armstrong 500 at Bathurst while wearing business suits as part of a sponsorship deal with a Sydney clothing store. After crossing the line in second place, the brothers were later disqualified for restarting their Cortina during a pit stop. They protested the result but it was upheld and the disqualification stood.

His best finish at Bathurst for the endurance race was second in 1967 driving a Ford XR Falcon GT with his brother Ian. The pair were flagged in first, but a protest by teammate Harry Firth saw the brothers relegated to second after a re-count of the lap charts. Unfortunately for Leo and Ian, just two hours after the start their Falcon ran out of petrol after it had passed the pits. Leo, who in the car at the time, was able to drive through the back gate into the pits (located about 1/3 the way up Mountain Straight) to be refuelled, which led the lap scorers to mistakenly credit the #53 Ford with a lap it did not complete, a fact Harry Firth immediately noted. The race was then awarded to Firth and his co-driver Fred Gibson. Until his death in 2015, Leo Geoghegan believed that the lap scorers had it correct the first time and that he and his brother should be in the record books as Bathurst winners in 1967.

Leo & Ian won the 1962 Bathurst Six Hour Classic at Mount Panorama driving a Daimler SP250 sports car, (that year the 500 mile race for touring cars were held at Phillip Island)

Geoghegan also finished third outright in the 1973 Hardie-Ferodo 1000 (the year the race was extended from 500 miles to 1000 kilometres) co-driving with Colin Bond in a Holden Dealer Team LJ Torana GTR XU-1. Ironically, the HDT was then run by Harry Firth while Leo's older brother Ian won the race co-driving with Allan Moffat in a Ford Works Team XA Falcon GT Hardtop. Leo later stated that the Torana was one of his least favourite cars he drove at Bathurst.

Other career highlights included victories in the following:

- 1960 Australian GT Championship
- 1962 Bathurst Six Hour Classic
- 1963 Australian Formula Junior Championship
- 1968 Surfers Paradise 6 Hour
- 1969 JAF Grand Prix (Formula Libre)
- 1970 Australian Drivers' Championship
- 1973 Australian Formula 2 Championship
- 1974 Australian Formula 2 Championship

Leo Geoghegan was the principal driver for Chrysler Australia during the period (1970–1972) when the company supported Valiant Pacer and Valiant Charger Series Production touring car teams. During this time, Leo and big brother Ian were involved in testing a ute fitted with a 5.6 litre, 340ci V8 engine and with the R/T Charger's wheelbase at the Mallala circuit in South Australia. The Geoghegan's reported that the extra weight of the V8 gave the car severe understeer and required earlier brake points. As a result, lap times were around 2–3 seconds slower than when the car was fitted with the Hemi six, though it was expected that the long straights and more open nature of the Mount Panorama Circuit would better suit the V8 engined car. The V8 Charger, which Chrysler Australia denied was to be used in Series Production racing, was eventually killed off in the Supercar scare in mid-1972 along with the V8 Holden Torana GTR XU-1 and the Ford Falcon GTHO Phase IV.

In addition to being a multi-Australian championship winning driver, Geoghegan has the rare distinction for an Australian of having won an international grand prix, specifically the inaugural JAF Grand Prix in 1969 held over 40 laps of the 6 km (3.728 mi) Fuji Speedway. Driving his ex-Jim Clark Lotus 39-Repco V8 in the race held for Formula Libre cars (which included Formula 2 and 1.6 litre cars) by the Japan Automobile Federation (JAF), Geoghegan was part of a large Australian contingent including Alec Mildren Racing with their drivers Kevin Bartlett and Max Stewart (Bartlett driving a 2.5L Mildren-Alfa Romeo V8, and Stewart driving a 1.6L Mildren-Waggott), Garrie Cooper in his own Elfin 600-Repco, and Glynn Scott driving a Bowin P3-Ford Cosworth. The Australian's all qualified at the front end of the grid, with Geoghegan third. He purposefully made a slow start so as not to strip the new gears in his Lotus and drove a steady race. As others fell out, he passed Stewart to take a lead he was not to lose. Geoghegan also set a new F2 lap record during the race with a 1:52.67 for an average of 119.7 mph.

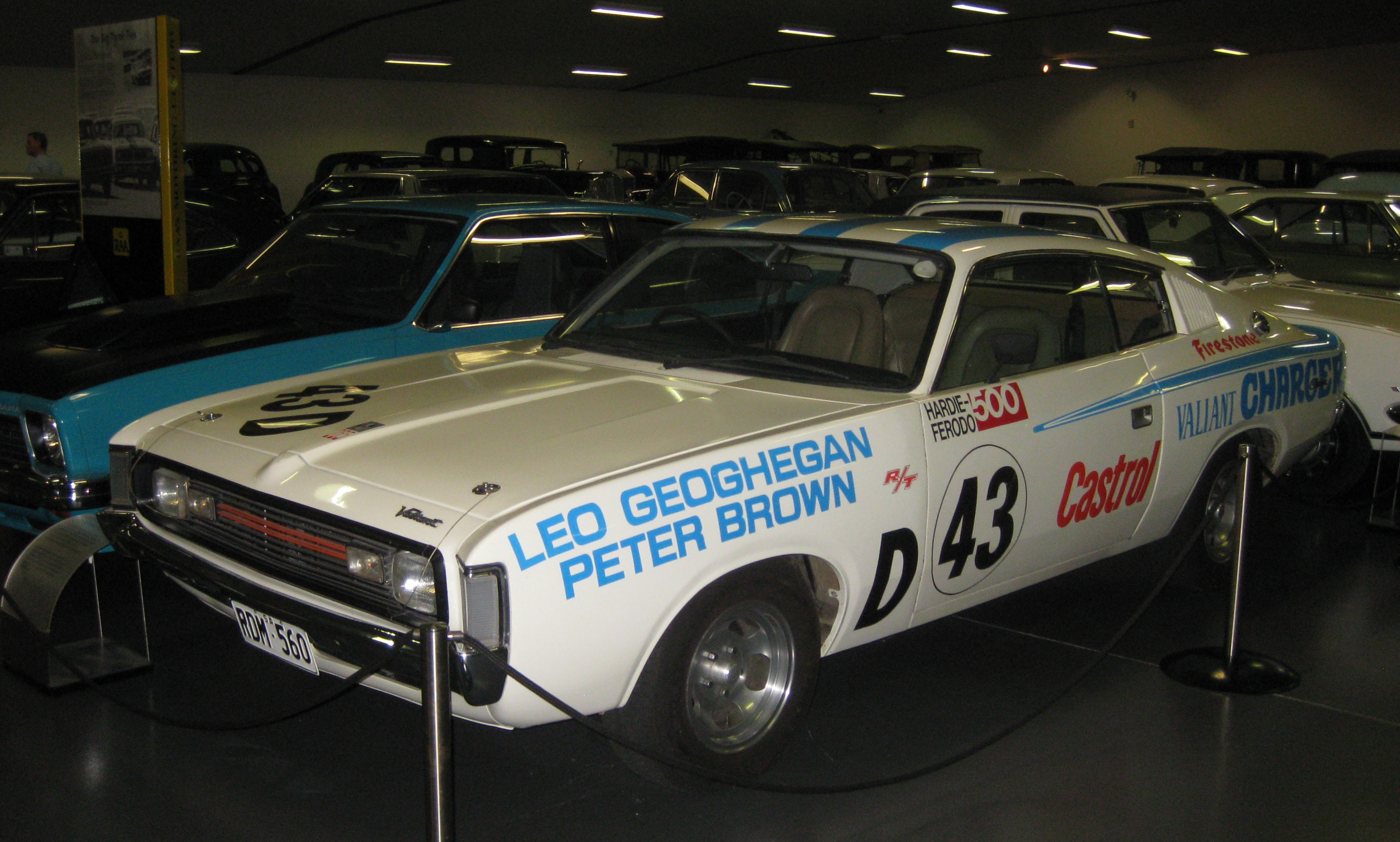
Geoghegan finished 2nd in Class D in the 1971 Hardie-Ferodo 500 in this Chrysler VH Valiant Charger R/T E38

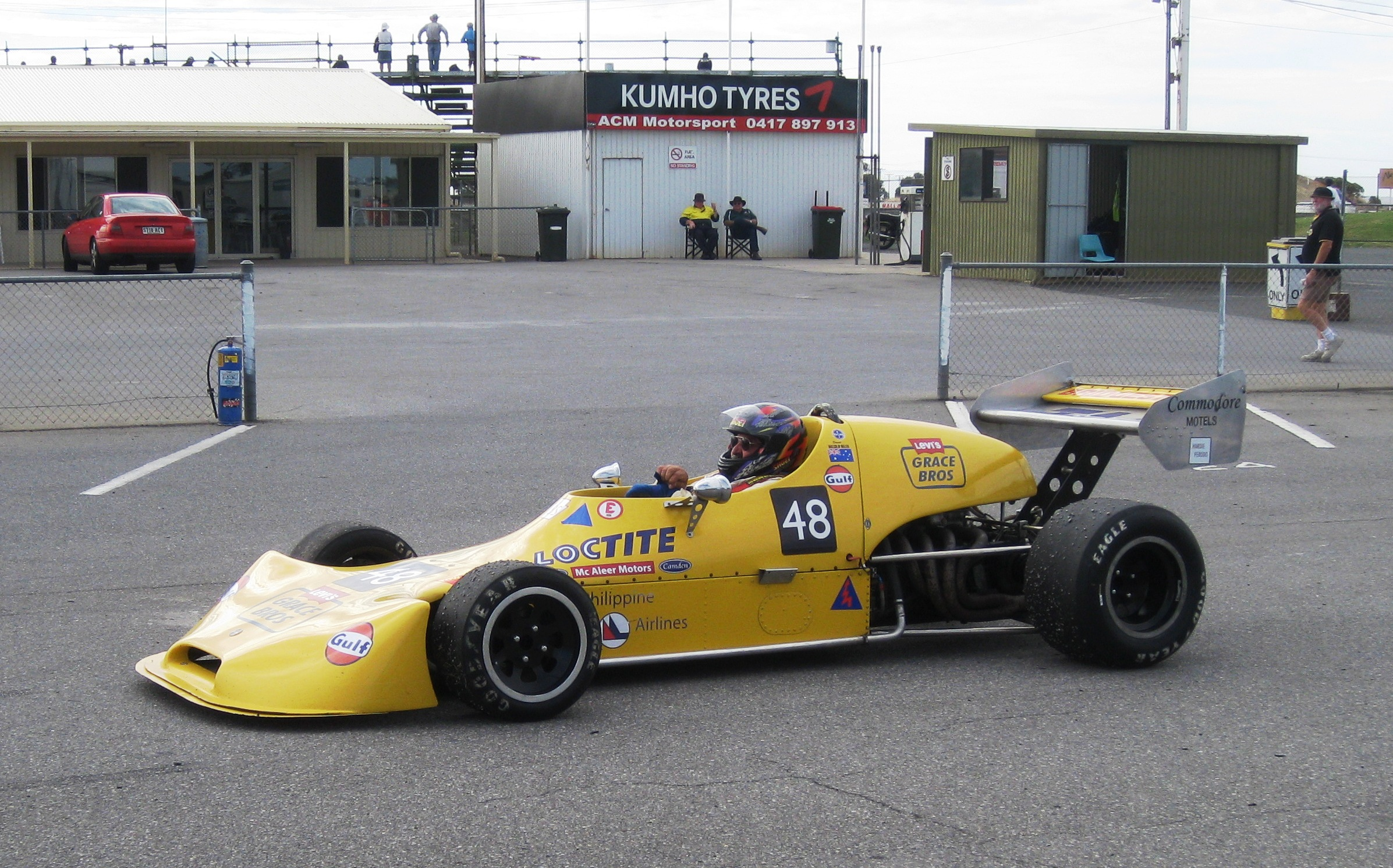
Geoghegan won the 1974 Australian Formula 2 Championship in this Birrana 274

== Death ==
Geoghegan died on 2 March 2015 at the age of 78 after a long battle with prostate cancer. He was survived by his widow, Del; sister Marie-Louise; two sons, Steven and Shaun; and two daughters Roslyn and Naomi; and cousin Warren Geoghegan.

== Career results ==
Year	Title/ event	Position	Car	Entrant
1960	Australian GT Championship	1st	Lotus Elite	Geoghegan Motors
1962	Australian Formula Junior Championship	3rd	Lotus 22 Ford Cosworth	Geoghegan Motors Liverpool
1963	Australian Drivers' Championship	13th	Lotus 20B Ford	Total Team
1963	Australian Formula Junior Championship	1st	Lotus 22 Ford	Total Team
1964	Australian Drivers' Championship	4th	Lotus 32 Ford	Total Team
1965	Tasman Series	14th	Lotus 32 Ford	Total Team
1965	Australian Drivers' Championship	3rd	Lotus 32 Ford	Total Team
1965	Australian 1½ Litre Championship	2nd	Lotus 32 Ford	Total Team
1966	Tasman Series	11th	Lotus 32 Ford	Total Team
1966	Australian Drivers' Championship	7th	Lotus 39 Climax FPF	Geoghegan Racing
1967	Tasman Series	7th	Lotus 39 Climax FPF	Geoghegan Racing
1967	Australian Drivers' Championship	5th	Lotus 39 Repco	Geoghegan Racing Division
1968	Tasman Series	11th	Lotus 39 Repco	Geoghegan Racing
1968	Australian Drivers' Championship	4th	Lotus 39 Repco	Geoghegan Racing Division
1969	Tasman Series	7th	Lotus 39 Repco	Geoghegan Racing
1969	Australian Drivers' Championship	2nd	Lotus 39 Repco	Geoghegan Racing Division
1970	Australian Drivers' Championship	1st	Lotus 59B Waggott	Geoghegan's Sporty Cars
1971	Tasman Series	15th	Lotus 59B Waggott	Geoghegan's Sporty Cars
1972	South Pacific Touring Series	8th	Chrysler VH Valiant Charger	Austral Motors
1973	Australian Formula 2 Championship	1st	Birrana 273 Ford	Grace Bros – 5AD City State Racing Team
1973	Australian Drivers' Championship	4th	Birrana 273 Ford	Grace Bros – 5AD City State Racing Team
1973	Toby Lee Series	3rd	Porsche 911S	Grace Bros / Reg Mort
1974	Australian Formula 2 Championship	1st	Birrana 274 Ford	Grace Bros. Levis Racing Team

=== Complete Tasman Series results ===
Year	Team	Car	1	2	3	4	5	6	7	8	Rank	Points
1964	Total Team	Lotus 27 Ford	LEV	PUK	WIG	TER	SAN; Ret	WAR; 9	LAK	LON	NC	0
1965	Total Team	Lotus 32 Ford	PUK; 6	LEV	WIG	TER	WAR; 8	SAN	LON		14th	1
1966	Total Team	Lotus 32 Ford	PUK; 5	LEV	WIG	TER	WAR; 7	LAK; Ret	SAN; Ret	LON	11th	2
1967	Geoghegan Racing Division	Lotus 39 Coventry Climax	PUK	LEV	WIG; 5	TER	LAK; Ret	WAR; 5	SAN; 2	LON; DNS	7th	8
1968	Geoghegan Racing Division	Lotus 39 Repco	PUK	LEV	WIG	TER	SUR; 4	WAR; Ret	SAN; 7	LON; DNS	11th	3
1969	Geoghegan Racing Division	Lotus 39 Repco	PUK; 5	LEV; 4	WIG; Ret	TER	LAK; 3	WAR; 5	SAN; DNS		7th	11
1971	Geoghegans Sporty Cars	Lotus 59B Waggott	LEV	PUK	WIG; 8	TER; 6	WAR; Ret	SAN	SUR		15th	1

=== Complete Phillip Island/Bathurst 500/1000 results ===
Year	Team	Co-driver	Car	Class	Laps	Overall position	Class position
1960		(Australia) Bill Pitt	Renault Dauphine	B	151	NA	11th
1963	Ford Australia	(Australia) Ian Geoghegan	Ford Cortina Mk.I GT	C	105	NA	DNF
1964	(Australia) Ford Motor Co	(Australia) Ian Geoghegan	Ford Cortina Mk.I GT	C	127	5th	5th
1965	(Australia) Ford Motor Co	(Australia) Ian Geoghegan	Ford Cortina Mk.I GT500	D	130	DSQ	DSQ
1967	Ford Australia	(Australia) Ian Geoghegan	Ford XR Falcon GT	D	130	2nd	2nd
1968	Ford Motor Company of Australia	(Australia) Ian Geoghegan	Ford XT Falcon GT	D	123	12th	7th
1969	Ford Australia	(Australia) Ian Geoghegan	Ford XW Falcon GTHO	D	128	5th	5th
1970	(Australia) Geoghegan's Sporty Cars	(Australia) Nick Ledingham	Chrysler VG Valiant Pacer 2 Barrell	C	128	5th	3rd
1971	(Australia) Geoghegan's Sporty Cars	(Australia) Peter Brown	Chrysler VH Valiant Charger R/T E38	D	129	7th	2nd
1972	(Australia) Geoghegan's Sporty Cars		Chrysler VH Valiant Charger R/T E49	D	127	4th	3rd
1973	(Australia) Holden Dealer Team	(Australia) Colin Bond	Holden LJ Torana GTR XU-1	D	163	3rd	3rd

Sporting positions
Preceded by Kevin Bartlett	Winner of the Australian Drivers' Championship; 1970	Succeeded by Max Stewart
