= Catalina Park =

Motor racing venue in New South Wales, Australia

Garguree (The Gully) formerly Catalina Park
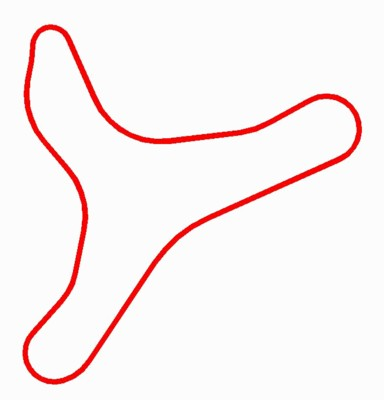
- Location: Katoomba, New South Wales
- Coordinates: 33°42′44″S 150°18′14″E
- Owner: Blue Mountains City Council
- Operator: Australian Racing Drivers Club
- Opened: 12 February 1961; 65 years ago Re-opened: 1993
- Closed: Closed 1st time: 25 January 1970; 56 years ago Closed 2nd time: February 2001
- Major events: 1962 Australian Formula Junior Championship

Full Circuit (1961–1970, 1993–2001)
- Length: 2.092 km (1.300 mi)
- Turns: 8
- Race lap record: 0:53.4 ( (Australia) Frank Matich, Matich SR4, 1969, Group A Sports Cars)

Catalina Park is a disused motor racing venue, located at Katoomba, in the Blue Mountains, New South Wales, Australia, and is recognised as an Aboriginal Place due to the long association of the local Gundungarra and Darug clans to the area.

== Overview ==
The 2.092 km (1.300 mi) circuit opened on 12 February 1961. Race meetings were staged by the Australian Racing Drivers Club in association with the Blue Mountains Sporting Drivers Club through to 1969, at which time the ARDC took over the Amaroo Park circuit. A race meeting was organized by the BMSDC in January 1970, however the club went into liquidation the following year. At the time of the circuit's closure, the lap record was credited to Frank Matich (Matich SR4) at 53.4 seconds, an average lap speed of 141 km/h (88 mph).

Originally used for top level motorsport including touring car, open wheeler, motorcycle and sidecar racing in the 1960s. The mountain location caused problems with fog causing delays in the race programs, also the track was very narrow by today's standards and surrounded by walls, armco railings and hillside. The track became used less with the opening of other circuits nearer to Sydney such as Oran Park and Amaroo Park.

In the 1970s the circuit was used for Rallycross, where the cars would use half the bitumen track and a dirt infield section with jumps, like Motocross.

By the 1980s the track was only being used for lap dashes with single cars on track at one time and was used until the mid-1990s for this.

The circuit still exists and can be walked around however it has deteriorated quite badly with grass growing through the track surface on what was Lockheed Straight and Dunlop Corner, and water seepage has caused part of the track to collapse between Craven A corner and Castrol corner.

== History ==
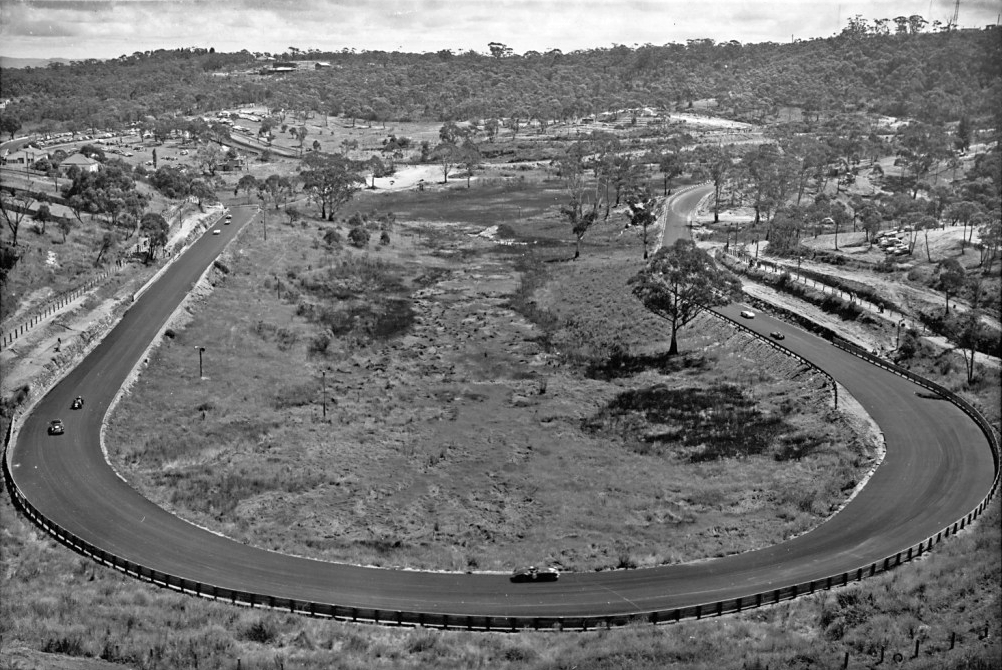
Catalina Park, circa 1965

Catalina Park, commonly known as The Gully, is situated in Katoomba and is also known as the Katoomba Falls Creek Valley. The Gully forms the headwaters of the Katoomba Falls Creek and is therefore part of the Warragamba Catchment area that provides Sydney’s water. It is an ecologically and culturally sensitive place.

Before white settlement, the traditional owners of the Gully – the Gundungurra and Darug peoples – used the Gully as a summer camp. Settlement at the foot of the mountains forced many Gundungurra and Darug people to resettle permanently in the Gully well before 1950. The flooding of the Burragorang Valley in the 1950s made this process irreversible.

In 1946, their relatively peaceful co-existence was shattered when the area was developed as a tourist park. The Kedumba Creek which feeds to the Katoomba Falls was dammed, forming an ornamental lake. The shell of a Catalina PBY-5 flying boat was shipped up on a truck and installed in the middle of the lake, giving the area its informal name. People could pay to visit and play with the airplane controls, while speedboat rides were carried out around it. Tearooms, a miniature train, ferris wheel, a merry-go-round, swimming pool, as well as a small cinema.

Eventually the amusements park became dilapidated and unpopular, with the government buying the land in 1952. The Catalina was removed and eventually sold for scrap, and a treated swimming pool was built. Five years later, a racetrack was organised by a group of 83 local businessmen (the Blue Mountains Sporting Drivers Club Limited) who were supported by the then Blue Mountains City Council. The last traditional owners were forcibly removed by 1959.

The Gully was declared an Aboriginal Place on 18 May 2002. From the time it was nominated until its declaration as an Aboriginal Place, took only nine months. The Gully in Katoomba became the largest Aboriginal Place in NSW. The Aboriginal Place declaration was warmly welcomed by the Gundungurra and Darug traditional owners and was marked by Indigenous and non-Indigenous alike with an official celebration in November 2002.

Since 2002, a significant amount of goodwill has slowly built up in Katoomba. Several small victories have taken place in the symbolic field. Among the most significant of these is the documentation of the history of the Gundungurra and Darug peoples in a book whose publication was supported by both the Sydney Catchment Authority and the Australian Centre for Independent Journalism at the University of Technology, Sydney. Sacred Waters: The Story of the Blue Mountains Gully Traditional Owners was written in close collaboration with the Gully people by anthropologist Dianne Johnson.
