= Lotus 39 =

1966 Tasman Series racecar

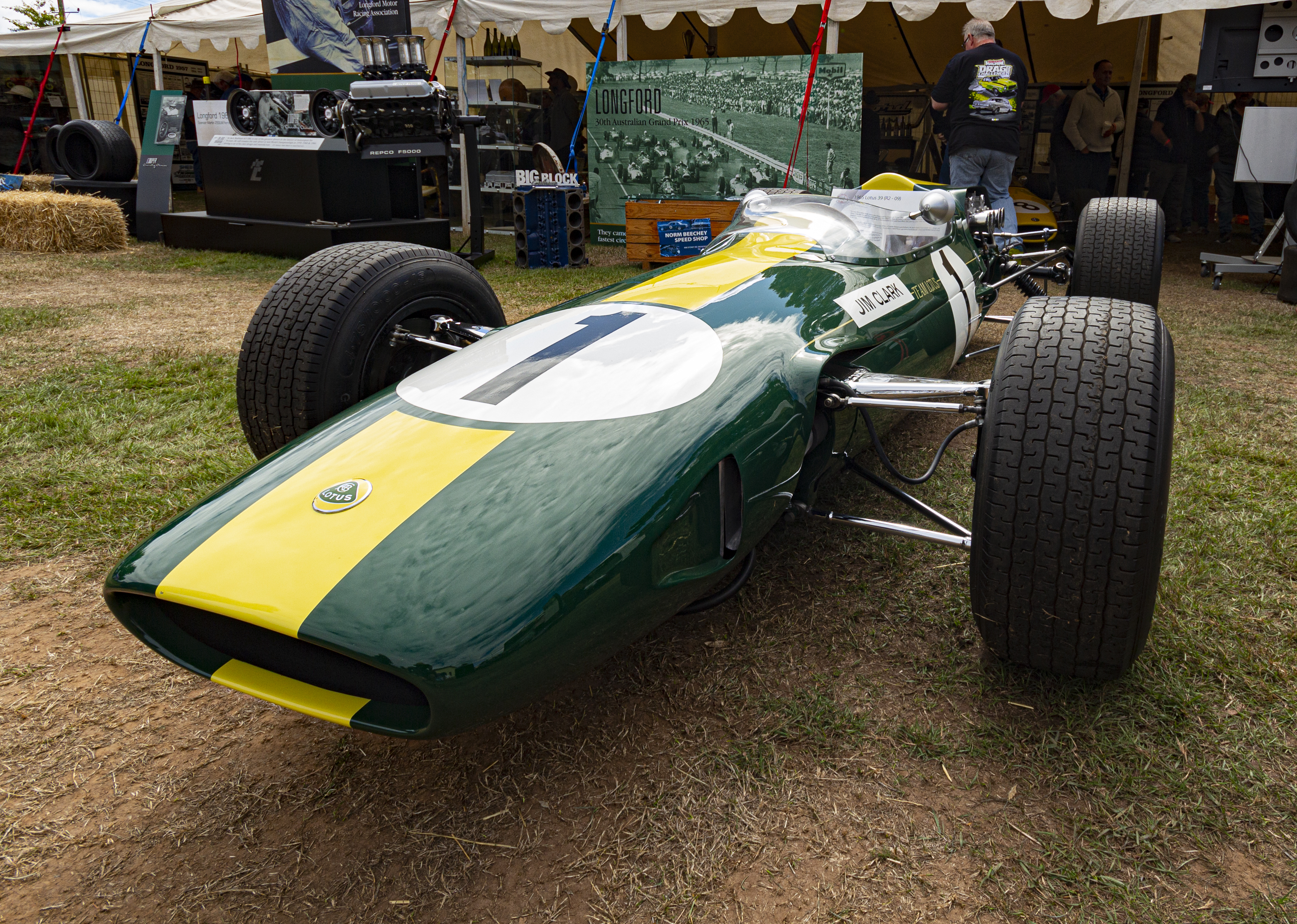

Overview
- Manufacturer: Lotus Components Ltd.
- Production: 1966-1970
- Designer: Colin Chapman

Body and chassis
- Class: Tasman Series
- Body style: Open wheel

Powertrain
- Engine: 2,495 cc Coventry Climax FPF Straight 4
- Transmission: Hewland HD5 5 speed Manual

Dimensions
- Wheelbase: 91.4 in (2,320 mm)
- Kerb weight: 567 kg (1,250 lb)

Chronology
- Predecessor: Lotus 38
- Successor: Lotus 41

The Lotus 39 was a single-seat racing car produced by Team Lotus. It was originally intended for use in Formula One, to be powered by the Coventry Climax 1.5 litre flat-16 engine. The engine project fell through and the chassis was modified to accept a Climax 2.5 litre engine for the 1966 Tasman Series, in which Jim Clark finished in third place.

== Design concept ==
Coventry Climax were developing a flat-16 engine, the FWMW, as a way of increasing the power from a 1.5 litre engine. To accommodate this engine, Lotus 33 chassis R12 was modified by cutting off the engine pontoons behind the cockpit, as the FWMW was intended to be mounted in a tubular space frame. This project was allocated type number 39. Unfortunately, the FWMW was plagued with development problems and, with a new 3-litre limit for F1 announced for 1966, development was halted, as were plans for a 3-litre version.

The 39 was then modified by then-new Lotus employee Maurice Philippe, who adapted the tubular space frame to take a 2.5 litre Climax FPF for Jim Clark to race in the 1966 Tasman Series.

== Racing history ==
In the 1966 Tasman Series, the modified car with its elderly engine was unreliable and uncompetitive against the BRMs of Jackie Stewart and Graham Hill, and Clark's best result was a single win at the Warwick Farm International. Clark eventually finished third in the series behind Stewart and Hill.

The car was then purchased by Leo Geoghegan who raced it in Australia and New Zealand from 1966 to 1970, replacing the Climax engine with a Repco-Brabham RB620 V8 in 1967. Geoghegan also used it with Repco-Brabham RB740 to win the 1969 JAF Grand Prix at the Fuji Speedway in Japan. The car was then sold to Brian Power who put a 1.5 litre Ford engine in the car. It was later rescued and restored to Climax specification by John Dawson-Damer. In 2008 it was included in the sell-off of Dawson-Damer's Lotus collection.
