= Bowin P3 =

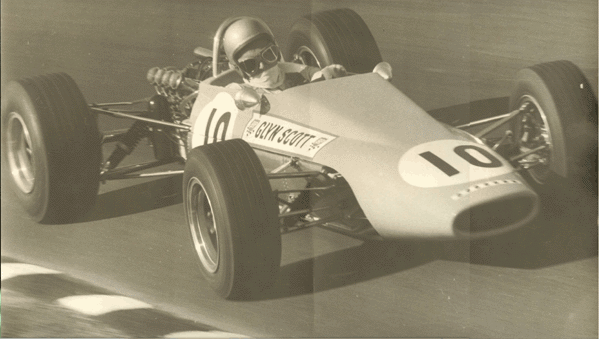

Overview
- Manufacturer: Bowin
- Production: 1968
- Assembly: Australia

Powertrain
- Transmission: Hewland F2-type FT2000

Dimensions
- Length: 90 in (2,286 mm)
- Width: 56 in (1,422 mm)

The Bowin P3 is a monocoque racing car that was produced in 1968 by Bowin. The P3 was designed for the Australian National Formula and the Australian 1½ Litre Formula. After the capacity limit for Australian Formula 2 was increased from 1100cc to 1600cc at the beginning of 1969, the P3 found a new home in that class. The car was designed by John Joyce, founder of Bowin and assisted by Ray Parson, better known as a mechanic.

This was the only Bowin car type to come out of the Joyce-Parsons association. The project took just over 12 weeks to complete.

Three P3s were built. The first was for Queensland racing driver Glyn Scott, who fitted the car with a "spare" 1600cc Cosworth FVA engine he bought from Piers Courage after the 1968 Tasman Series. A Formula 2 version was built for Ian Ferguson and a Holden powered hillclimb car was produced for Barry Garner.

== Design ==
=== Concept ===
There were two major points about the Bowin Cars' construction: the chief aim of the project was to build a car that was economical enough for Australian racers to afford which was also easy to maintain – unlike most monocoques. Equally important was that almost every component of the car, with the exception of the engine and transmission, was entirely manufactured in Australia.

Joyce designed his own magnesium hub carries, suspension members, wheels, steering, and so on, and fabricated them in his own workshops or had them manufactured by Australian companies. For example, Commonwealth Aircraft Corporation cast the wheels and hub carriers.

Most non-local components used in the car simply could not be manufactured in Australia, although Joyce would have been willing to try local producers had they existed. Those non-Australian components include English FPT fuel cells, made of the rare material hycathane, the Girling disc calipers, fitted all round, and some other special fittings, including the lightweight aircraft battery that fits underneath the driver's knee.

The design programme for the Bowin P3 included as much planning for economic production and lifetime maintenance as for any other phase of the project. Wrapped up in the prime considerations of economics and adaptability was an intense dedication to the idea that this should be purely an Australian car. To achieve this, Joyce borrowed no particular existing designs, but did not consciously avoid them. He believed all ideas on the car were based on sound, established practices and that the only innovations are logical and developments of these. Although Joyce felt the P3 may owe something to a McLaren, the differences were really quite noticeable.

=== Design features ===
The monocoque chassis extends from the front bulkhead to the rearmost engine-transmission mount. The actual chassis projects forwards as far as the front suspension location, but the pedals, master cylinders, radiator, and so on are hung on outriggers built on to the monocoque.

At the rear, the engine sits on integral monocoque rails, and the chassis is not an extension of the bottom or "tub"; of the cockpit part of the monocoque as on many integral chassis design cars.

The engine rails are cross-braced only at the rearmost point. The chassis is supplied complete with transmission (Hewland FT200) since the rear suspension is partly located on the transmission.

The fuel tanks were created as an integral part of the chassis design and were built around the design intention of utilising only fuel cells as fuel carriers. The flexible cells are stuffed through apertures in the cockpit and clip into place on special mountings.

The seat is also part of the chassis, and provision was made in its location for the installation of an auxiliary fuel tank to add to the twin 12-imperial-gallon (55 L; 14 US gal) cavities provided on each side.

The actual cockpit interior dimensions are wider than a Lotus and McLaren monocoque, although the exterior width is small. This makes for an extremely sleek and small body, with better comfort for the driver. A neat touch is the flared-out sides to the cockpit, which Joyce hoped would overcome most of the driving problems associated with lack of elbow-room.

The aerodynamics of the monocoque design basically hinged on a constant upward sloping flat line that carried through from the mouth to behind the driver's head. The design was influenced by John's practical experience with this type of design in his wind-tunnel testing work conducted on the 1968 Lotus Turbine car for Indianapolis. Many of the ideas used in the latter design were Joyce's; these were adapted for the Bowin P3 as well.

== Specification ==
The car chassis had high stiffness monocoque, of high strength alloy and steel, utilising the latest techniques in assembly with emphasis placed on ease of maintenance and repair.

The front suspension of the car was independent, with double wishbones operating entirely on adjustable rod-ends and a separate anti-roll bar. Springing by coil springs was enabled in conjunction with Armstrong dampers, incorporating adjustable spring platforms. The suspension has built-in anti-dive qualities.

The rear suspension was fully independent, with double wishbone and radius arm configuration, incorporating anti-squat characteristics. The car was fitted with Armstrong adjustable dampers and spring platform adjustment. Coil springs were used. A separate adjustable anti-roll bar was included in the suspension. Outboard drive-shafts were hollowed out to reduce unsprung weight. Rear hub carriers were made of magnesium cast. The suspension operates entirely on adjustable rod-ends with provision for toe-in and camber adjustments.

Disc brakes were used. Rear discs were mounted inboard of the hub carrier. Twin master cylinders with adjustable ratio balance bar were also included.

Lightweight rack and pinion with adjustable steering column and lightweight 10 inch leather-covered steering wheel was used. Steering arms were connected to the rack by adjustable rod-ends.

The car transmission type was Hewland gearbox F2 type FT2000 with full magnesium casing. The car's cooling system included Crossflow radiator low-mounted in nose, connected to power unit by allow pipes and flexible hoses. The oil cooling system included Crossflow alloy oil cooler connected to engine via alloy pipes and high pressure flexible hoses. The fuel system had a 12-imperial-gallon (55 L; 14 US gal) fuel cells on each side, in a side panel with twin filters and breathers.

Bodywork included a removable fibreglass nose panel and engine cover of advanced aerodynamics. Twin alloy rear vision mirrors were included in the car.

Electricals were fitted with a master battery switch and separate ignition switch and starter solenoid.

Purchase price of the car in 1968 was $7,000 Australian dollars, including transmission and wheels.
