= Richard Attwood =

British racing driver (born 1940)

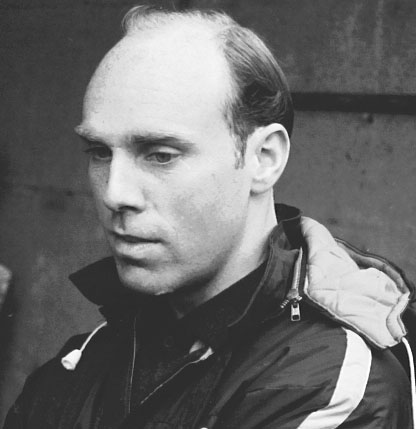
- Attwood at the 1968 German Grand Prix
- Born: Richard James David Attwood; 4 April 1940 (age 86); Wolverhampton, Staffordshire, England

Formula One World Championship career
- Nationality: (United Kingdom) British
- Active years: 1964–1965, 1967–1969
- Team(s): BRM; Reg Parnell Racing; Cooper; Lotus
- Entries: 17 (16 starts)
- Championships: 0
- Wins: 0
- Podiums: 1
- Career points: 11
- Pole positions: 0
- Fastest laps: 1
- First entry: 1964 British Grand Prix
- Last entry: 1969 Monaco Grand Prix

Richard James David "Dickie" Attwood (born 4 April 1940) is a British motor racing driver from England. During his career he raced for the BRM, Lotus and Cooper Formula One teams. He competed in 17 World Championship Grands Prix, achieved one podium and scored a total of 11 championship points. He was also a successful sports car racing driver and won the 1970 24 Hours of Le Mans race, driving a Porsche 917, the first of Porsche's record 19 victories at the famous race.

== Early career ==
Attwood got into the motor industry as an apprentice at sports car manufacturer Jaguar. He started racing in 1960 at the wheel of a Triumph TR3. For 1961, he joined the Midlands Racing Partnership to drive for them in club-level Formula Junior events, and continued in this role until the end of 1962. In 1963, the team expanded into the international arena, and Attwood immediately grabbed motorsport headlines when he won the Monaco Grand Prix Formula Junior support race, in a Lola Mk5a. This and other performances during the year earned him the inaugural Grovewood Award, voted for by a Guild of Motoring Writers panel.

On the back of this success, in 1964 MRP decided to step up to the Formula Two class. Attwood won in Vienna and took second places in the Pau Grand Prix, Eifelrennen, and Albi Grand Prix. This was at a time when top-line Grand Prix drivers were an integral part of the Formula Two series; indeed, at Pau he was only beaten by reigning Formula One World Champion Jim Clark driving a full-works Lotus.

== Formula One and other single-seat series ==
Attwood's performances in Formula Two prompted Alfred Owen, the proprietor of BRM, to offer him an opportunity in his works Formula One team. His first outing for the team was in the non-Championship News of the World Trophy race, at Goodwood, in which he took the BRM P57 to fourth place, the first non-Lotus finisher and the only car to end on the same lap as Colin Chapman's fleet winners. Attwood's second Formula One outing was in the 1964 British Grand Prix, driving BRM's experimental four wheel drive P67 model. Having been the project's test driver Attwood did manage to qualify the overweight car, albeit in last place on the grid. However, as the car was principally intended as a rolling test bed, BRM decided to withdraw the P67 prior to the race itself.

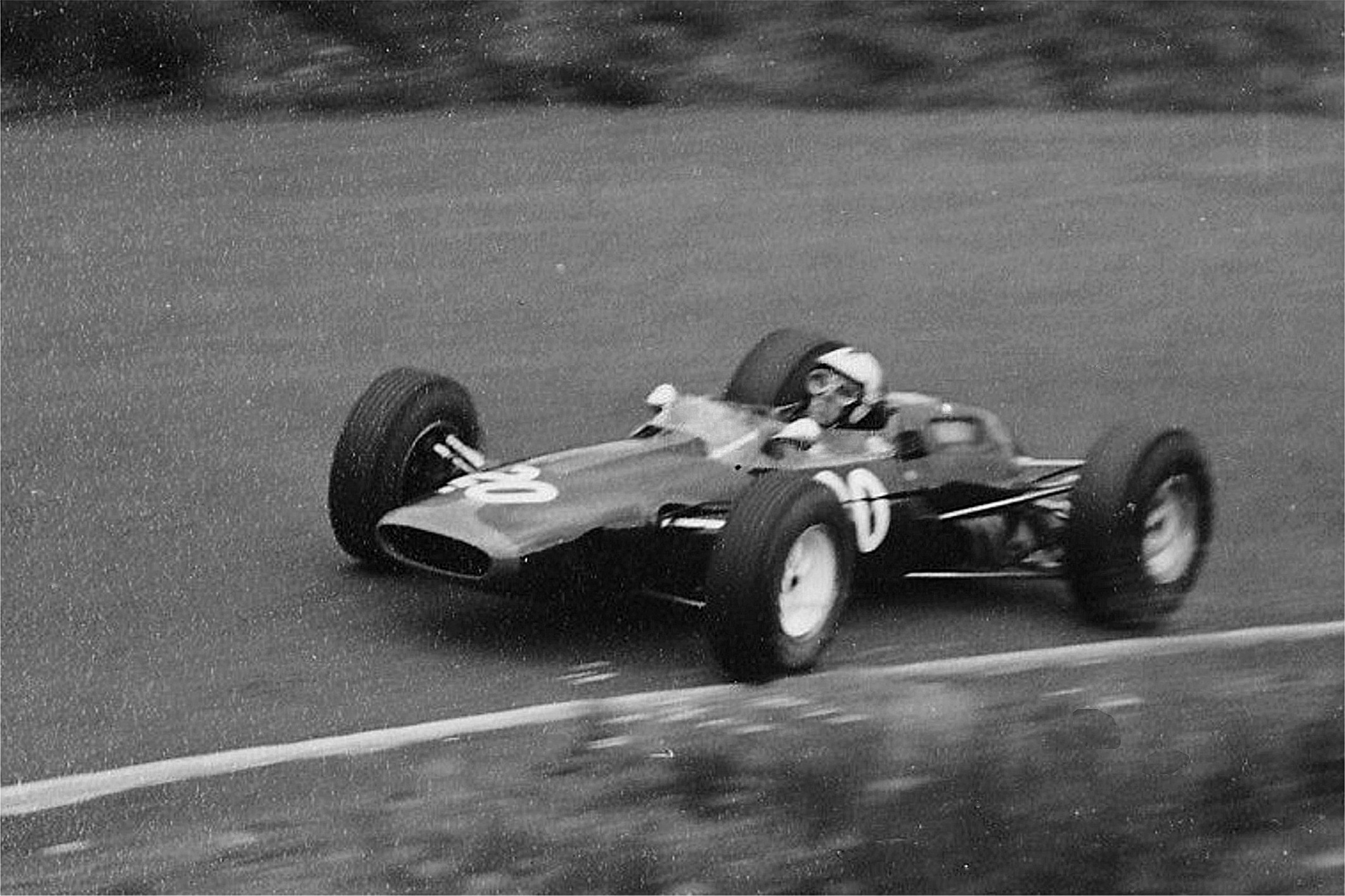
Attwood driving for Reg Parnell Racing at the 1965 German Grand Prix.

Tim Parnell signed Attwood to his privateer Reg Parnell Racing team for 1965, driving a formerly class-leading Lotus 25. Unfortunately for Attwood, by 1965 the chassis was past its best, and fitted with the BRM motor it was distinctly uncompetitive. Although generally reliable, Attwood only managed to pick up a pair of sixth-place points finishes towards the end of the season.

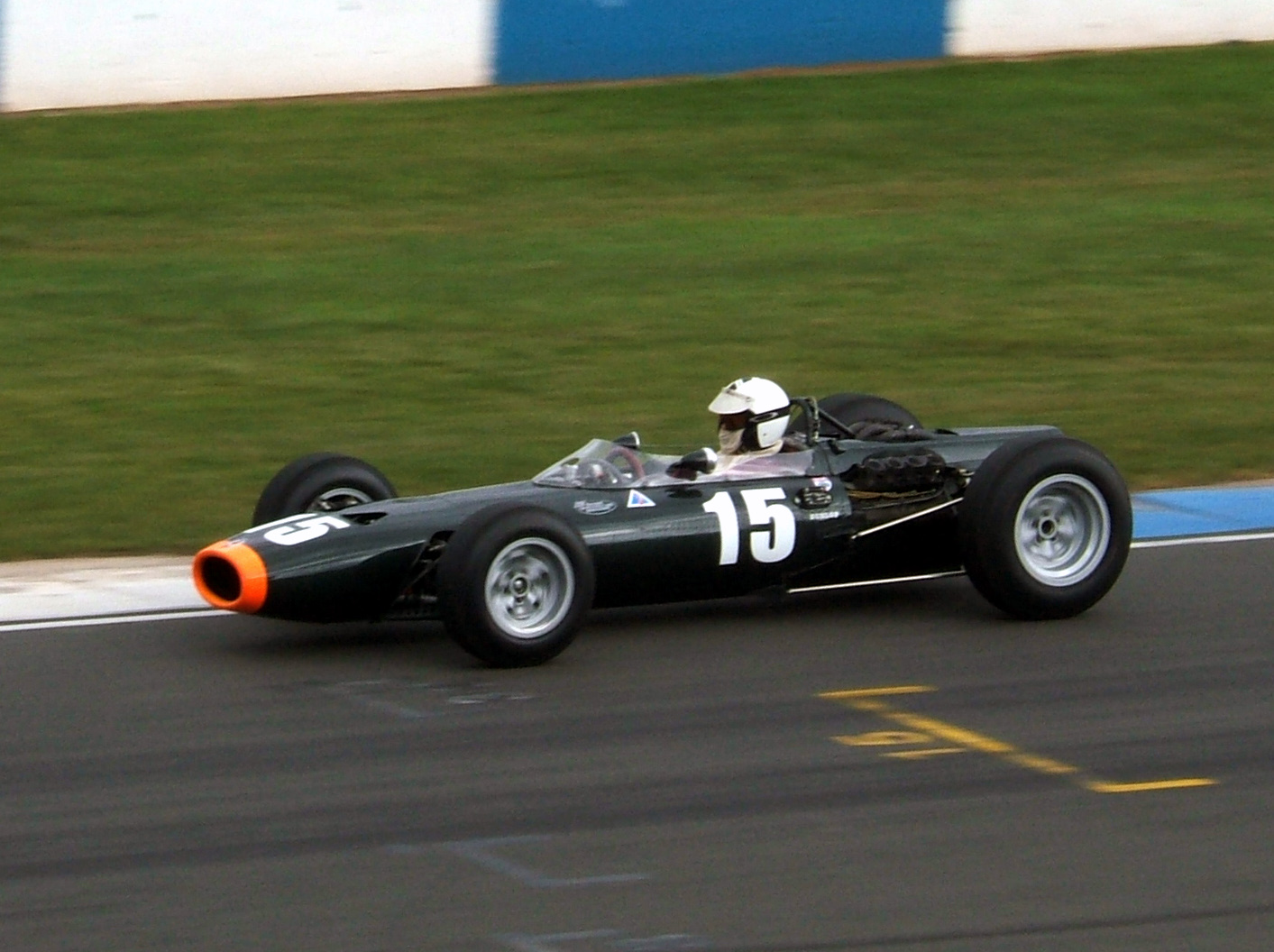
Attwood driving a BRM P261 Formula One car, identical (apart from engine capacity) to the one which he drove in the Tasman Series in 1966 and 1967.

In 1966, Attwood competed in Australia and New Zealand as a part of BRM's Tasman Series squad. His Tasman performances were very promising, including a win at Levin, but despite this – perhaps due to his underwhelming 1965 Formula One performances and growing success in sports cars – Attwood sat out the majority of the 1966 and 1967 Formula One seasons. His only appearance came as a substitute for works-Cooper driver Pedro Rodríguez at the 1967 Canadian Grand Prix, bringing the Cooper-Maserati home in tenth place. During 1966, he maintained his run of form in Formula Two, taking victory in the Rome Grand Prix and a second place at Pau in 1966, but concentrated firmly on sports cars in 1967.

After Mike Spence's death during practice for the 1968 Indianapolis 500 race, Attwood rejoined the BRM works team, now run by Parnell, as his replacement. Attwood's first race on his return was perhaps his most spectacular, taking fastest lap in the 1968 Monaco Grand Prix, on his way to a strong second-place finish behind Graham Hill's works Lotus. However, results declined through the remainder of the season, and four races from the end Attwood was himself replaced by Bobby Unser.

Always something of a Monaco specialist, it was in the principality that Attwood made his final Formula One start. Colin Chapman brought in the Briton as substitute for the injured Jochen Rindt, driving the Lotus 49B. He finished in a respectable fourth-place. Although this was his last Formula One drive, he did appear at the 1969 German Grand Prix in a Formula Two Brabham for Frank Williams, where he finished sixth overall, and second in the Formula Two class.

== Sports car racing ==
24 Hours of Le Mans career
- Years: 1963 – 1971, 1984
- Teams: Lola Cars Ltd. Ford Motor Company; Maranello Concessionaires; David Piper Racing; Porsche System; Porsche KG Salzburg; John Wyer Automotive; Viscount Downe Aston Martin
- Best finish: 1st (1970)
- Class wins: 1 (1970)

In 1964, as Attwood was taking his first steps in Formula One, he was also approached by the Ford GT prototype project team, later to evolve into the Ford GT40, and became one of the first drivers to take the iconic car onto a race track. He shared a GT40 with Jo Schlesser in the 1964 24 Hours of Le Mans, but was forced to retire due to the car catching fire. His first major international sports car victory came at the 1964 Rand 9 Hours race in South Africa, driving David Piper's Ferrari P2.

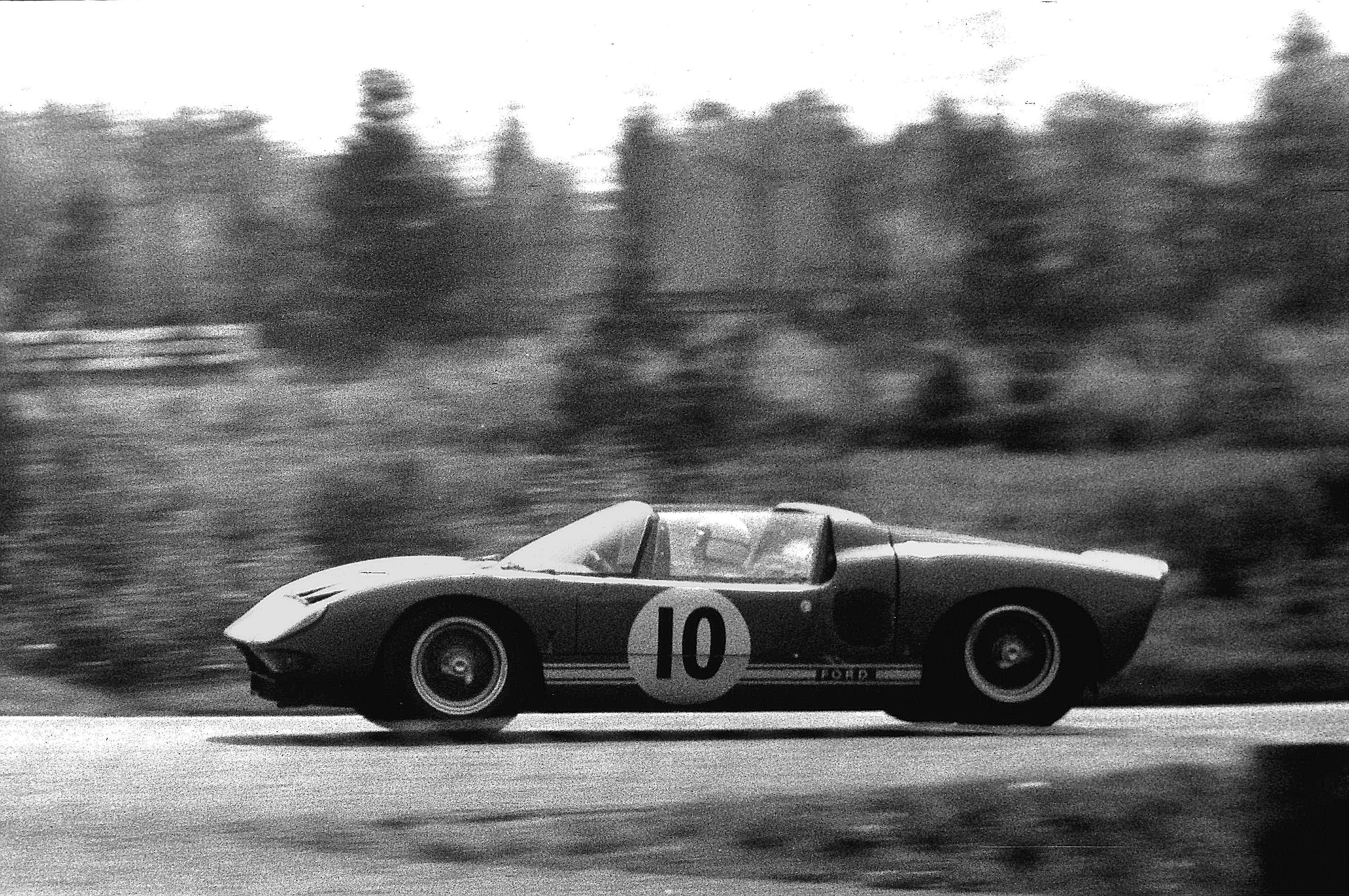
Richard Attwood driving the open, spyder version of the Ford GT, at the Nürburgring in 1965.

It was with David Piper that Attwood developed perhaps his longest lasting professional relationship. He drove Piper's green Ferraris – including the 250LM and 330P3/4 – on many occasions over the following five years, collecting a few point finishes in World Sportscar Championship events, and paired up with Piper for the Maranello Concessionaires team. Highlights during this time included a third place in the Spa 1000 km and second in the 500km Zeltweg in 1967. Attwood did not restrict himself to Ferrari and Ford though, putting in drives in machinery as diverse as the Porsche 906 and Alfa Romeo T33. He was also one of the few drivers to race the infamous Ford P68, GT successor to the GT40, failing to finish due to mechanical maladies during the 1968 1000km Nürburgring.

Having driven privateer Porsches, for the 1969 World Sportscar Championship season Attwood was signed to the Porsche works team. Commonly paired with fellow Brit Vic Elford, the season's highlights were a pair of second places, driving the Porsche 908, in the BOAC 500 (the drivers' home race at Brands Hatch) and the Watkins Glen 6h race. Later in the season Attwood was again involved in the development of an iconic sports racing car: the Porsche 917. The Elford/Attwood pairing took their 917 up to 327 laps in the 1969 24 Hours of Le Mans, but the car suffered a gearbox failure with only two hours to go, after leading for a substantial portion of the race.

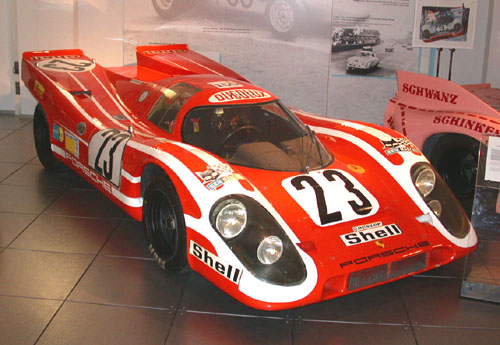
The Porsche Museum's chassis 001 painted like the 023 Porsche 917K driven to victory in the 1970 24 Hours of Le Mans by Attwood and Hans Herrmann.

Attwood subsequently went on to win the Le Mans 24 Hours in 1970 with a Porsche 917K, along with Hans Herrmann. Hermann and Attwood also took second place in the 1970 Nürburgring race, this time back in a 908. Driving with Herbie Müller once more in a Porsche 917 he finished second in the 1971 24 Hours of Le Mans, this time for the John Wyer privateer team. At the end of the season, after also winning the 1000km Zeltweg race along with his teammate Pedro Rodríguez, Attwood retired from motorsport.

Attwood came out of retirement briefly in 1984, as a part of the moribund Aston Martin Nimrod Le Mans project. Following his car's failure to finish in the 1984 24 Hours of Le Mans race after a hideously violent accident while John Sheldon was driving, Attwood retired from front line racing for good. With the growth in popularity of historic motorsport, he frequently appeared in events and Porsche shows with his own Porsche 917, which Steve McQueen used in his film Le Mans. The car was painted to represent his 1970 Le Mans-winner, and Attwood referred to it as "my pension", as the value of the car had risen rapidly over the decades since he bought it in the 1970s. In 2000, Atwood cashed-in his pension, when he sold the car in an auction for £1 million. Today, he is still very active in historic motorsport, often making memorable appearances at the Goodwood Festival of Speed, GoodWood Revival and Goodwood Members Meetings, among many yearly excursions.

== Personal life ==
Attwood once owned a 1989 Peugeot 405 estate which he bought new and successfully drove 415,000 miles, with the original engine and clutch. This was the subject of an article in Evo. On 13 June 2017 it was put up for sale by a subsequent owner, but as of 18 June the ad, with almost 2000 views, had no offers.

== Racing record ==
=== Complete Formula One World Championship results ===
(key) (Races in italics indicate fastest lap)

Year	Entrant	Chassis	Engine	1	2	3	4	5	6	7	8	9	10	11	12	WDC	Points
1964	Owen Racing Organisation	BRM P67	BRM V8	MON	NED	BEL	FRA	GBR; DNS	GER	AUT	ITA	USA	MEX			NC	0
1965	Reg Parnell Racing	Lotus 25	BRM V8	RSA	MON; Ret	BEL; 14	FRA	GBR; 13	NED; 12	GER; Ret	ITA; 6	USA; 10	MEX; 6			16th	2
1967	Cooper Car Company	Cooper T81B	Maserati V12	RSA	MON	NED	BEL	FRA	GBR	GER	CAN; 10	ITA	USA	MEX		NC	0
1968	Owen Racing Organisation	BRM P126	BRM V12	RSA	ESP	MON; 2	BEL; Ret	NED; 7	FRA; 7	GBR; Ret	GER; 14	ITA	CAN	USA	MEX	13th	6
1969	Gold Leaf Team Lotus	Lotus 49B	Cosworth V8	RSA	ESP	MON; 4	NED	FRA	GBR							13th	3
1969	Frank Williams Racing Cars	Brabham BT30 (F2)	Cosworth Straight-4							GER; 6*	ITA	CAN	USA	MEX		13th	3

* Formula 2 entry, second in class, not eligible for World Championship points

=== Complete Formula One non-championship results ===
(key)

Year	Entrant	Chassis	Engine	1	2	3	4	5	6	7	8
1964	Owen Racing Organisation	BRM P57	BRM V8	DMT	NWT; 4	SYR	AIN	INT	SOL	MED	RAN
1965	Reg Parnell Racing	Lotus 25	BRM V8	ROC; Ret	SYR	SMT; 6	INT; 8	MED	RAN		

=== Complete Tasman Series results ===
(key) (Races in bold indicate pole position; results in italics indicate fastest lap)

Year	Entrant	Chassis	Engine	1	2	3	4	5	6	7	8	Pos.	Pts
1966	Owen Racing Organisation	BRM P261	BRM P60 1.9 V8	PUK	LEV; 1	WIG; 2	TER; Ret	WAR	LAK	SAN	LON	6th	15
1967	Owen Racing Organisation	BRM P261	BRM P111 2.1 V8	PUK; 3	LEV^{1} 3	WIG; 2	TER^{1} 2	LAK	WAR	SAN	LON	5th	10
1968	Owen Racing Organisation	BRM P126	BRM P121 2.5 V12	PUK	LEV	WIG	TER	SUR; Ret	WAR; Ret	SAN; 6	LON; 4	10th	4

^{1}Levin and Teretonga in 1967 did not count towards Tasman Cup points

=== Complete 24 Hours of Le Mans results ===
Year	Team	Co-drivers	Car	Class	Laps	Pos.	Class pos.
1963	(United Kingdom) Lola Cars Ltd.	(United Kingdom) David Hobbs	Lola Mk6 GT	P +3.0	151	DNF	DNF
1964	(United States) Ford Motor Company	(France) Jo Schlesser	Ford GT40	P 5.0	58	DNF	DNF
1966	(United Kingdom) Maranello Concessionaires	(United Kingdom) David Piper	Ferrari 365 P2	P 5.0	33	DNF	DNF
1967	(United Kingdom) Maranello Concessionaires	(United Kingdom) Piers Courage	Ferrari 412P	P 5.0	208	DNF	DNF
1968	(United Kingdom) David Piper	(United Kingdom) David Piper	Ferrari 275LM	S 5.0	302	7th	**2nd**
1969	(West Germany) Porsche System Engineering	(United Kingdom) Vic Elford	Porsche 917	S 5.0	327	DNF	DNF
1970	(Austria) Porsche KG Salzburg	(Germany) Hans Herrmann	Porsche 917K	S 5.0	343	**1st**	**1st**
1971	(United Kingdom) JW Automotive Engineering	(Switzerland) Herbert Müller	Porsche 917K	S 5.0	395	**2nd**	**2nd**
1984	(United Kingdom) Viscount Downe- Aston Martin	(United Kingdom) Mike Salmon (United Kingdom) John Sheldon	Nimrod NRA/C2B	C1	92	DNF	DNF

Sporting positions
Preceded by Peter Arundell	Monaco Formula Three; Race winner 1963	Succeeded by Jackie Stewart
Preceded by Jacky Ickx; Jackie Oliver	Winner of the 24 Hours of Le Mans; 1970; With: Hans Herrmann	Succeeded by Helmut Marko; Gijs van Lennep
