= BRM V8 engine =

BRM P56 BRM P60
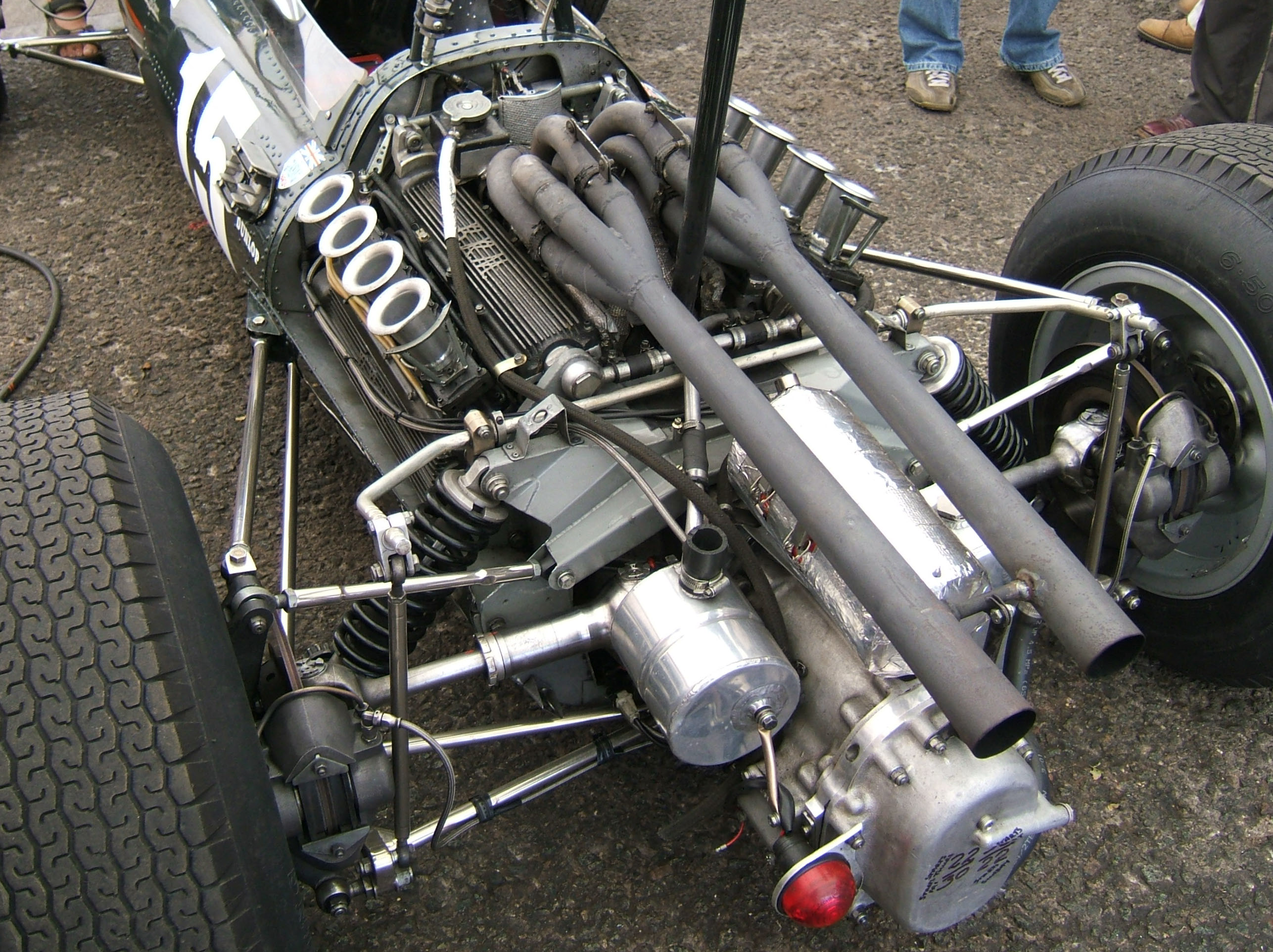

Overview
- Manufacturer: (United Kingdom) British Racing Motors
- Production: 1962–1967

Layout
- Configuration: 90° V8
- Displacement: 1.5–2.0 L (92–122 cu in)
- Cylinder bore: 68.5 mm (2.70 in)
- Piston stroke: 50.8 mm (2.00 in)
- Valvetrain: 16-valve, DOHC, two-valves per cylinder
- Compression ratio: 10.5:1

Combustion
- Fuel system: Fuel injection
- Fuel type: Gasoline
- Oil system: Dry sump

Output
- Power output: 188–220 hp (140–164 kW)

Dimensions
- Dry weight: 264 lb (120 kg)

The British Racing Motors V8 was a four-stroke, naturally aspirated, 1.5 L (92 cu in), V-8 racing engine, designed, developed and built by British Racing Motors (BRM) to compete in Formula One racing, also an enlarged 2.0 L (120 cu in) version was used for sports car racing. It was built between 1962 and 1967, and came in two version; the P56, and the P60.

== Background ==
By the end of the 1961 season BRM had managed to build an engine designed by Peter Berthon and Aubrey Woods (BRM P56 V8) (2.6975 x 2.0 in, 68.5 x 50.8 mm) which was on a par with the Dino V6 used by Ferrari and the Coventry Climax V8 used by other British teams. However, the real change was the promotion by Owen of an engineer who had been with the team since 1950 (originally on secondment from Rolls-Royce to look after the supercharging on the V16), Tony Rudd, to the position of chief development engineer. Rudd was the first professional engineer to exercise full technical control over the team, and basic engineering and reliability problems which had plagued the team for years began to vanish. He was given greater responsibility in 1960 after two of the drivers, Graham Hill and Dan Gurney, went on strike and told Alfred Owen they would not drive again, and in early 1962 full executive authority was given to Tony Rudd. Raymond Mays and Peter Berthon were sidelined. The team had designed their first mid-engined car for 1960, matching the other teams, and won the World Drivers' Championship with Graham Hill as driver, in 1962 with the P57. (During 1962, BRM also ran Lucas electronic ignition.) During 1965, 210 bhp (160 kW) at 11,000 rpm was the rated power. However, at the high-speed 1965 Italian GP (Monza) an uprated version was raced with 220 bhp (160 kW) at 11,750 rpm for short bursts. A planned 4-valve-per-cylinder version in cooperation with Weslake Engineering never materialised.

1962 BRM P578 at Goodwood Festival of Speed 2010

As part of Owen's attempt to make BRM pay its way, the V8 engine was sold to privateers and appeared in a number of other chassis during the 1.5 L formula, particularly in private Lotus chassis and in smaller marques such as BRP.

A number of privateers acquired 1961 and 1962 BRMs during this period, including Maurice Trintignant and Scuderia Centro Sud; these cars continued to race for many years.

The monocoque BRM P261 V8 car was soon developed and these ran on through the 1.5-litre formula and performed useful service in the early races of the subsequent 3.0-litre formula. In 1965 Jackie Stewart was signed to partner Hill; he took his first Grand Prix win at Monza in his debut season, and won the first world championship race of the new three-litre formula with a car fitted with a Tasman 2.1 litre V8; once again BRM were not ready for the start of a new formula and the old cars continued to be used, even on occasion after the H16 was ready.

Jackie Stewart used the Tasman variant of BRM's V8 to win the 1966 Tasman Series. He then finished in 2nd place in the 1967 Tasman Series which included winning both the New Zealand and Australian Grands Prix.

The BRM V8 also found use in the Daren Mk.3, however the BRM V8 used in the car is bored out from stock 2.58 mm (0.102 in), upping the total displacement to 2,136 cc (130.3 cu in)
