= BRM P261 =

1960s British Formula One racing car

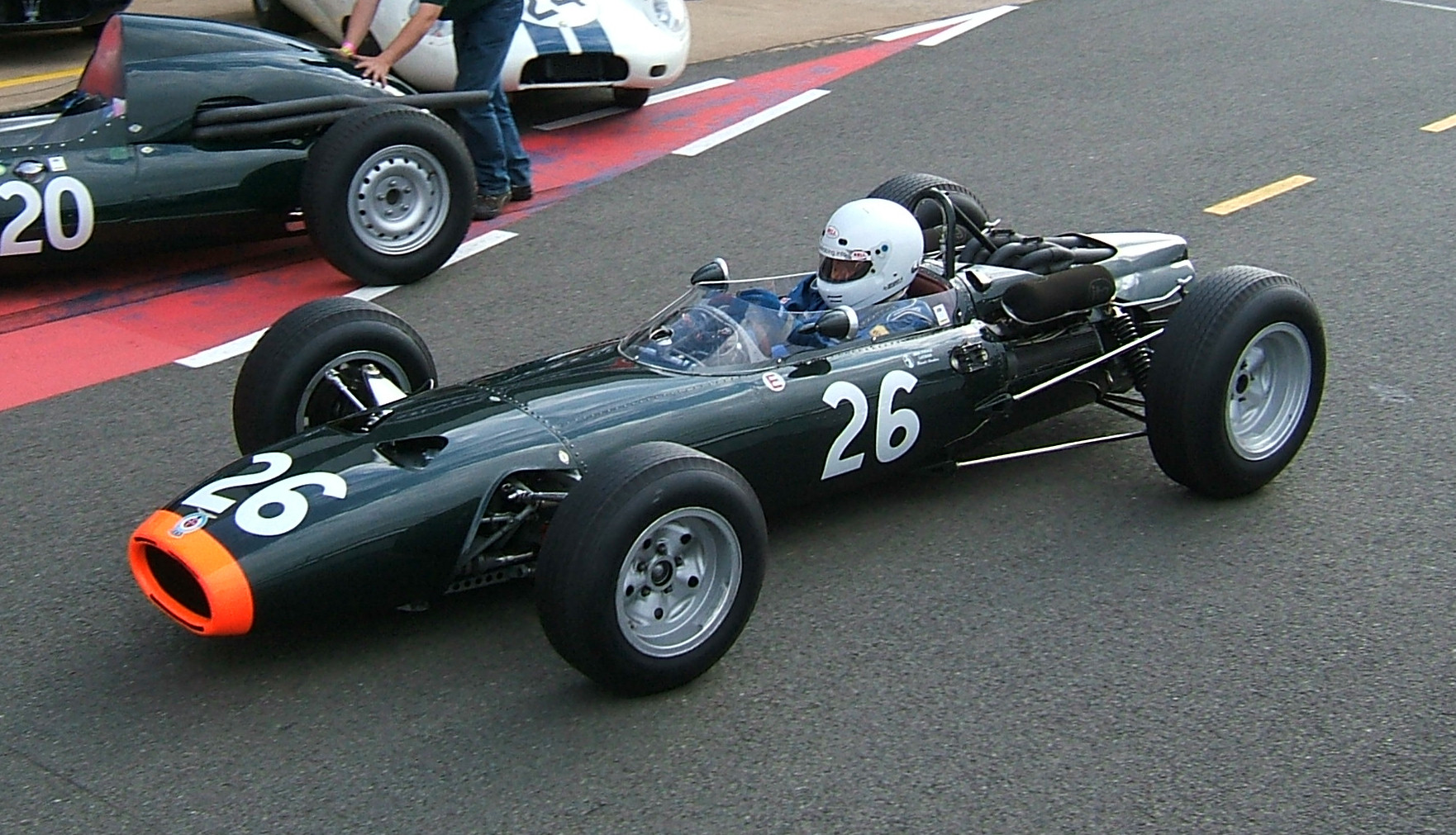
- The P261 at the 2007 Silverstone Classic
- Category: Formula One/Tasman
- Constructor: British Racing Motors
- Designer: Tony Rudd
- Predecessor: BRM P61
- Successor: BRM P67 / BRM P83

Technical specifications
- Chassis: Duralumin monocoque
- Suspension (front): Double wishbone, with inboard spring/damper units
- Suspension (rear): Double wishbone, with outboard coilover spring/damper units
- Axle track: F: 54 in (1,372 mm) (adj.); R: 53 in (1,346 mm) (adj.)
- Wheelbase: 91 in (2,311 mm) (adjustable)
- Engine: BRM P56 1,498 cc (91.4 cu in) V8 Naturally aspirated mid-mounted
- Transmission: BRM P72 6-speed manual
- Weight: 1,028 lb (466.3 kg)
- Fuel: Shell
- Tyres: Dunlop

Competition history
- Notable entrants: Owen Racing Organisation; Reg Parnell Racing; Bernard White Racing
- Notable drivers: (United Kingdom) Graham Hill (United States) Richie Ginther (United Kingdom) Jackie Stewart (United States) Bob Bondurant (United Kingdom) Innes Ireland (United Kingdom) Piers Courage (United Kingdom) Chris Irwin (United Kingdom) David Hobbs
- Debut: 1964 Monaco Grand Prix
- First win: 1964 Monaco Grand Prix
- Last win: 1966 Monaco Grand Prix
- Last event: 1968 Italian Grand Prix
Races	Wins	Poles	F/Laps
34	6	5	4
- Constructors' Championships: 0 (2nd: 1964; 1965)
- Drivers' Championships: 0 (2nd: 1964; 1965 - Graham Hill)
- Unless otherwise stated, all data refer to Formula One World Championship Grands Prix only.

The BRM P261, also known as the BRM P61 Mark II, is a Formula One motor racing car, designed and built by the British Racing Motors team in Bourne, Lincolnshire, England. The BRM P261 was introduced for the 1964 Formula One season, and its design was an evolution of Tony Rudd's one-off BRM P61 car of 1963. The P261 had a relatively long racing career; variants of the car were still being entered for Formula One World Championship Grands Prix as late as 1968. During the course of their front-line career, BRM P261s won six World Championship races, in the hands of works drivers Graham Hill and Jackie Stewart, and finished second in both the Drivers' and Constructors' Championship standings in 1964 and 1965. Stewart, Hill and Richard Attwood also used works P261s to compete in the Tasman Series in 1966. The BRMs dominated, with Stewart winning four, Hill two, and Attwood one of the 1966 Tasman Series' eight races. Stewart also won the title. The works-backed Reg Parnell Racing team returned in 1967 with Stewart and Attwood, where Stewart added another two wins to his tally. In terms of races won and total championship points scored, the P261 was the most successful car in BRM's history.

== Design ==
=== Chassis ===
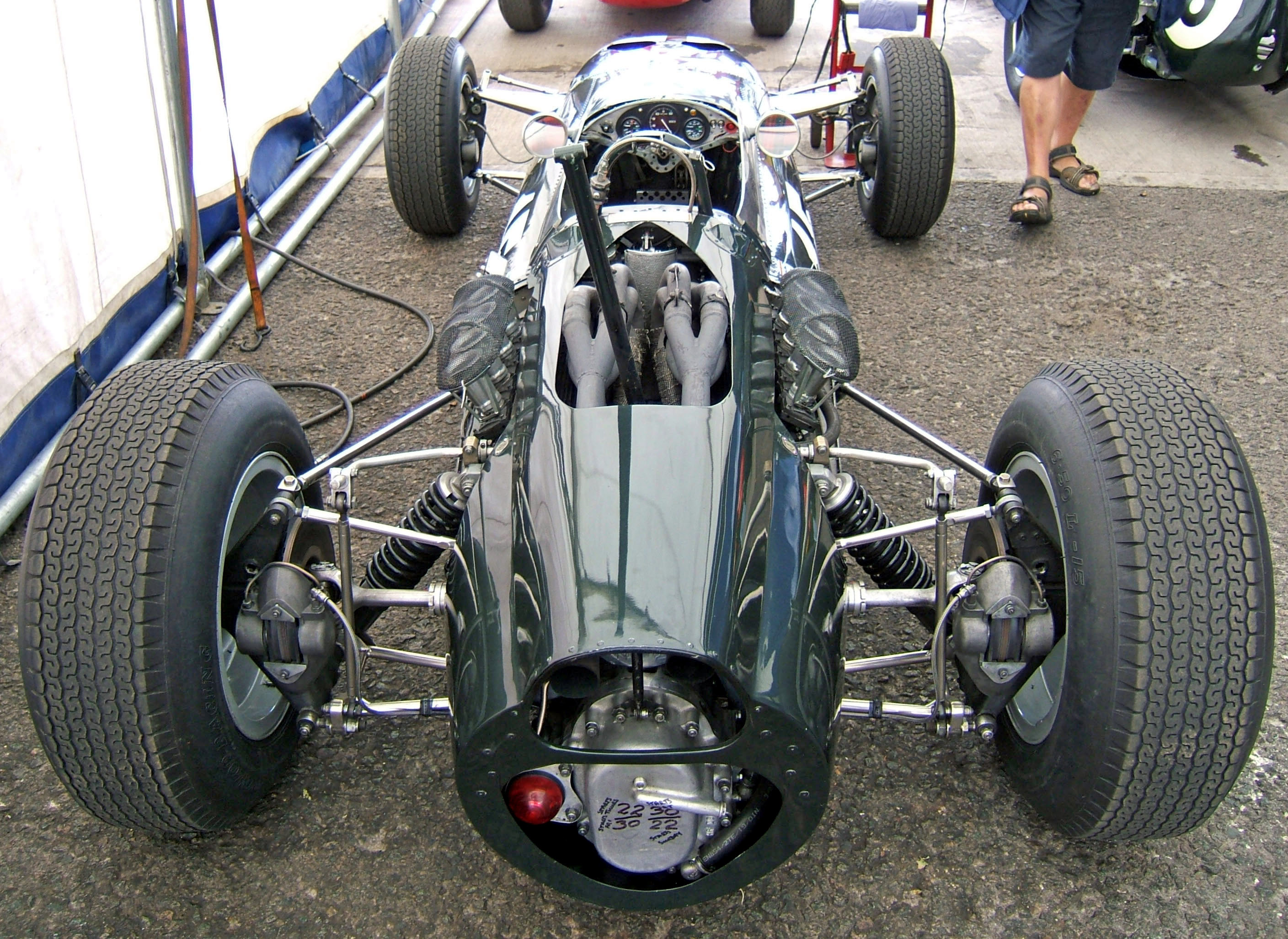
A rear view of an ex-Jackie Stewart BRM P261, showing the distinctive, barrel-shaped engine cowling

Colin Chapman's monocoque Lotus 25 of 1962 had put the writing on the wall for older spaceframe chassis designs, and most other Formula One constructors hurriedly started work on their own monocoque cars. The BRM P261 was British Racing Motors's first fully monocoque chassis. Its prototype, the one-off P61 introduced in 1963, pioneered many of BRM's monocoque elements, but used a tubular subframe for its rear engine mounting. As its name suggests, with the P261 (or P61 Mark II) designer Tony Rudd simply built upon the P61's structure, rather than introducing a completely new car. To emphasize this continuity, the P261 chassis numeration continues the P61 sequence, with the first P261 chassis being numbered 2612.

BRM had some previous experience of stressed skin construction with the BRM P25, so Rudd was in a good position to be able to exploit the new technology to the full. This previous experience meant that Rudd's use of the monocoque was somewhat different from the pioneering Lotus's frame. Where the 25 had been a channel-section frame with an open top, within which the driver sat, the P261 chassis was a slim tubular-section, into which a hole was cut to allow the driver to gain access. To replace the P61's subframe the side pontoons of the P261 chassis were extended behind the driver's seat, and the engine was mounted between them. Within the pontoons, rubber cells were used to retain fuel. This caused complications early in the P261's life, as BRM's new, high-exhaust version of the P56 V8 engine was not ready for the start of the 1964 season, and holes had to be cut in the pontoons to allow the exhaust pipes of the older, low-exhaust version to pass through them. The centre exhaust engine appeared at the 1964 Italian Grand Prix in Graham Hill's new chassis "2616" and this and "2617", which was Jackie Stewart's regular car in 1965, were the only two P261s which did not have the exhaust slots. These were plated over on the earlier cars which remained in service, but could be opened up if necessary to fit outside exhaust engines, as happened in the 1967 Tasman Championship.

=== Engine ===
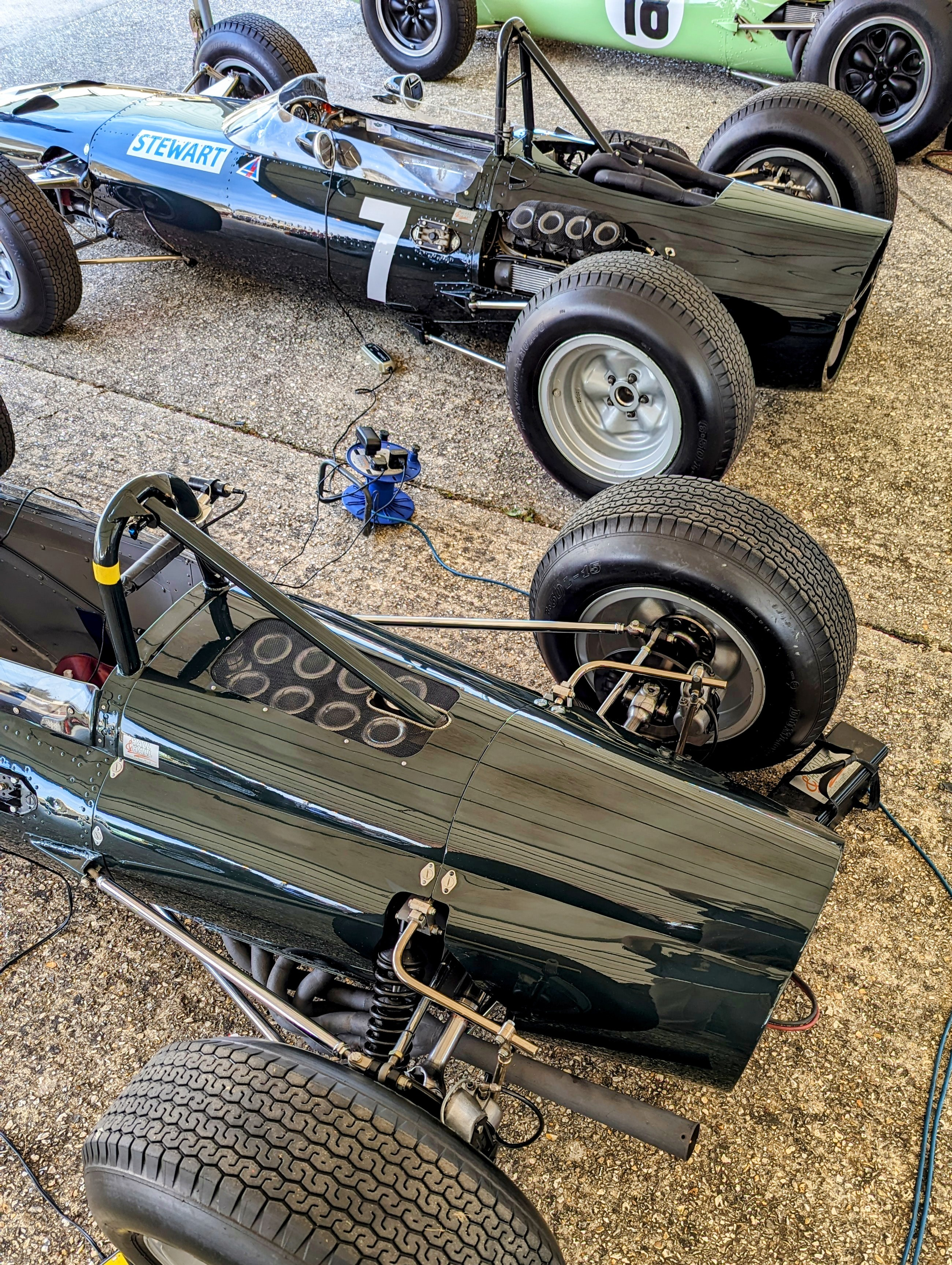
Two P261 cars, showing the initial (nearest camera), and later engine installation configurations

In comparison to the older engine, the position of the inlet trumpets and exhaust manifolds had been switched, so that the exhausts exited on the upper surface of the engine, within the cylinder vee, and the inlets protruded above the chassis pontoons on either side of the car. Between the chassis pontoons the engine was covered with a removable, curved panel. Completing the engine cowling was a near-circular gearbox and differential cover at the rear, through which the tail pipes of the exhausts protruded. Shifting the inlets to the outer edges of the car allowed the engine to ingest cooler, denser air, boosting the motor's power output. The compact exhaust bundle also allowed a svelte packaging of the engine bay. However, the heat build-up from the confined manifold necessitated cutting a hole in the top of the engine cover. Despite this, the BRM P261's barrel-shaped rear end became one of its most distinctive visual characteristics.

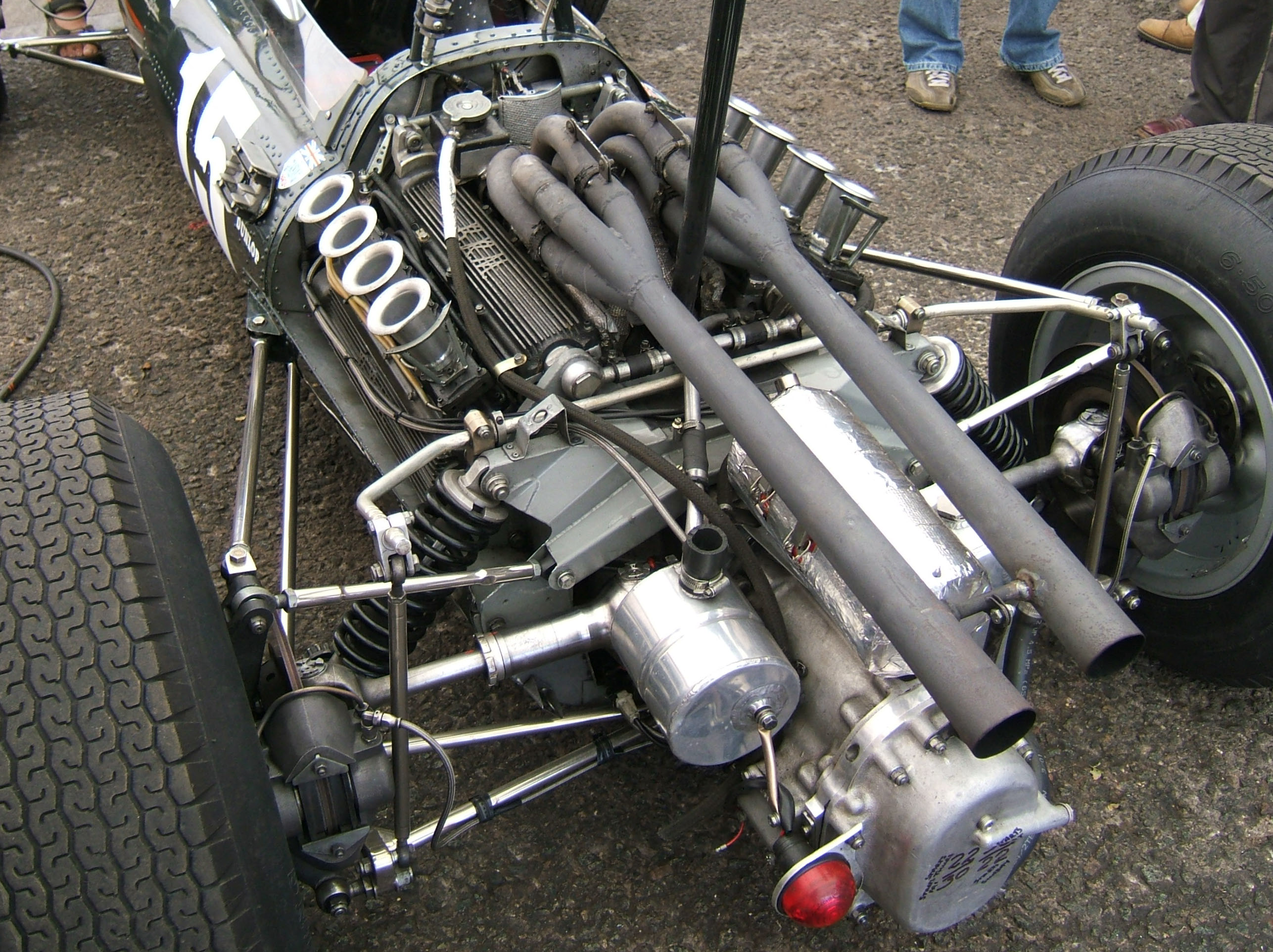
The high-exhaust version of the BRM P56 V8 engine, installed in the rear of BRM P261

The engine's internals remained almost unaltered from the Peter Berthon-designed unit which was installed in the V8 version of the P57, the BRM P578, with which Graham Hill had won the World Championship in 1962. BRM had experimented with a four-valve-per-cylinder version of the engine, but this was abandoned in favour of the tried and trusted, oversquare (68.5 x 50.8 mm), fuel-injected, two-valve, quad-cam configuration. The 1965 Formula One engine was rated at 210 bhp (157 kW) at 11,000 rpm, but was upgraded at Monza to 220 bhp (164 kW) at 11,750 rpm. In its Formula One form the engine had a capacity of 1,498 cc (91 cu in), but for the early 1966 Tasman Series races this was increased to 1,916 cc (116.9 cu in). In 1966 the Formula One upper engine size limit was raised from 1.5 to 3.0 litres, and the 1.9-litre Tasman unit was pressed into service for the World Championship as well. It was further uprated to 2.0 litres as the season progressed. For the P261's 1967 trip to the Antipodes the engine capacity was stretched yet further, providing the ultimate 2,136 cc (130.3 cu in) version, which also saw service in a few Formula One races later in the year. In an attempt to keep the P261 competitive into 1968, the fifth chassis was fitted with the new, 3-litre V12 BRM engine, but without success.

=== Ancillaries ===
Fully independent double wishbone suspension was employed at all four corners. Another significant change made from the P61 design was to move the suspension shock absorber components outboard at the rear. This switch was initially made to accommodate the extra cam-cover space needed to employ the 32-valve motor, but though that unit was shelved the suspension geometry was retained. At the front, the coil spring and damper units were retained within the monocoque skin, resulting in a clean, aerodynamic profile around the car's nose-cone. Braking was by outboard-mounted, Dunlop disc brakes all round.

A total of six BRM P261 cars were constructed, with both the first and last chassis built being written off during their careers and rebuilt by the factory. All six survive.

== Competition history ==
=== 1964 ===
The BRM P261 made its race debut at the non-Championship Daily Mirror Trophy race, at Snetterton on 14 March 1964. Only one car was ready at the time, and it was entered for long-serving works driver Graham Hill. The car immediately showed its promise, as Hill took second place in qualifying, beaten only by newly crowned World Champion Jim Clark's Lotus 25. Unfortunately for Hill, in the race itself he retired following an accident on only the seventh lap. The early season shakedown races continued well for the BRM team; Hill set fastest lap at Goodwood on 30 March, and was only prevented from winning when the car's rotor arm dropped off two laps from the end. Hill added a further two second-place finishes, at the Aintree 200 and BRDC International Trophy races, before the first race of the World Championship season.

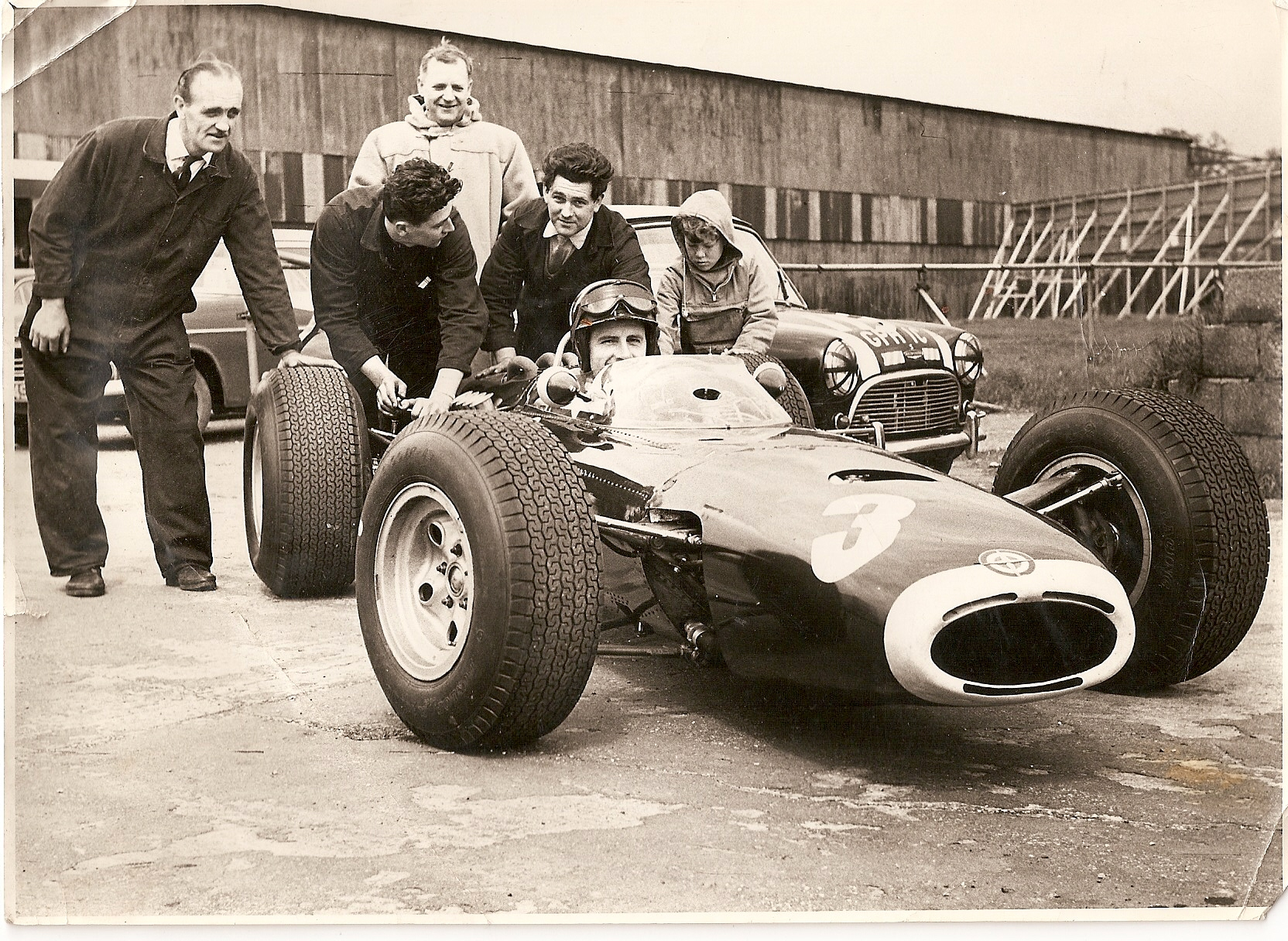
Chassis designer John Crosthwaite (in the pale duffel coat) oversees BRM mechanics pushing driver Graham Hill out on to the track, during testing of a BRM P261

Despite the rather interim nature of its engine and chassis configuration, on its World Championship debut at the 1964 Monaco Grand Prix the BRM P261 had the best of starts. Although Hill and team-mate Richie Ginther only managed to qualify in third and eighth places, respectively, in the race Hill set fastest lap, and the two P261s finished first and second. It was the second of Hill's five victories on the Côte d'Azure. Hill continued to perform well throughout the first half of the season, and took a string of three back-to-back second places in France, Britain and Germany. Ironically, it was with the introduction of the proper, high-exhaust version of the engine in Italy that the car's reliability began to falter. At Monza Hill qualified on the front row of the grid, but as he sat waiting for the flag to drop his clutch seized open, and his car sat stationary as the rest of the field streamed past him. Hill bounced back to win in the United States, but finished out of the points at the season finale in Mexico following a collision with Bandini. With reasonable results from Ginther, BRM finished the season second in the Constructors' Championship, with Hill also second in the Drivers' Championship.

=== 1965 ===
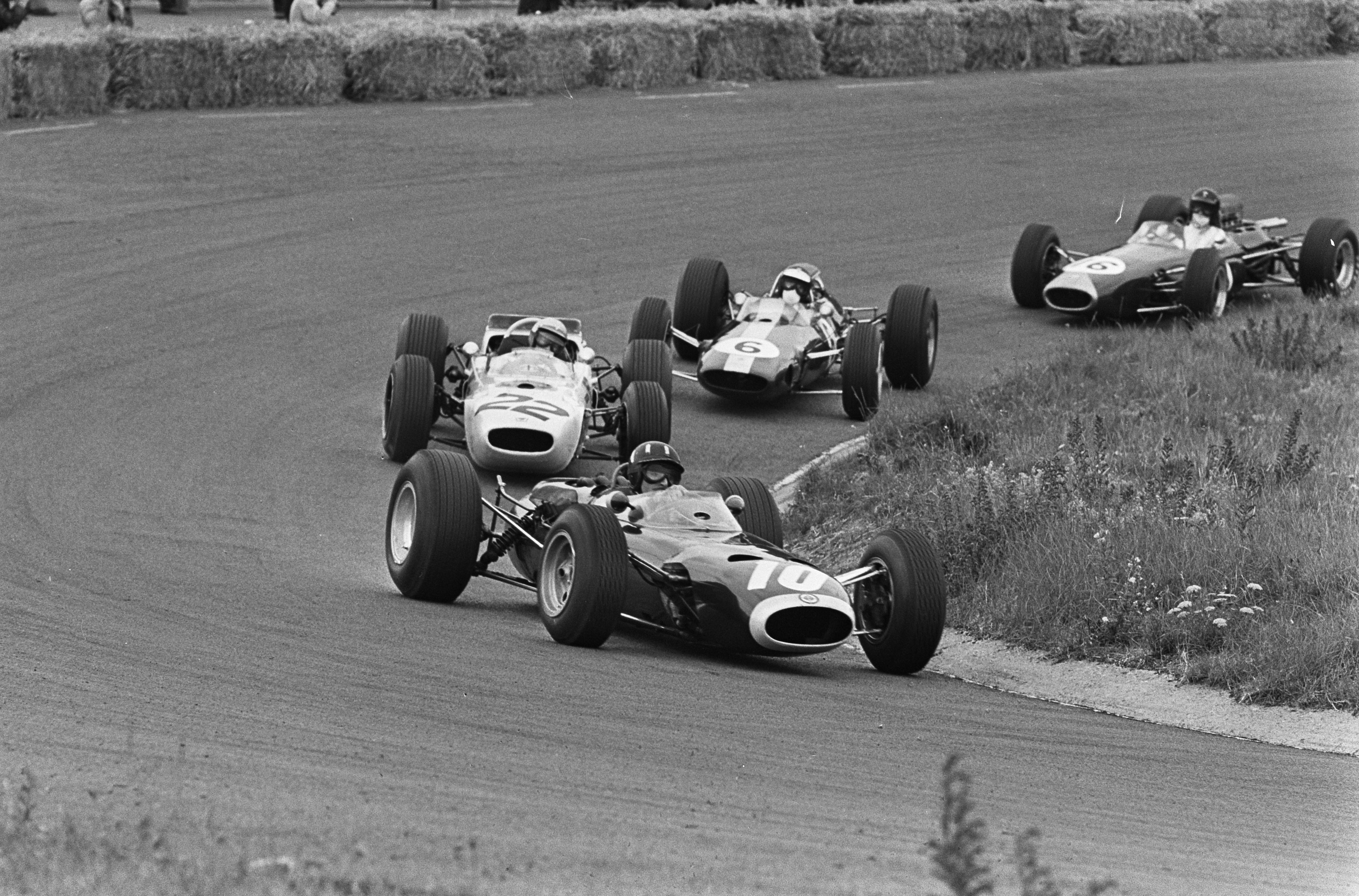
Graham Hill in his BRM P261, leading in the early laps of the 1965 Dutch Grand Prix. He had started in pole position, but finished the race in fourth.

BRM's new driver signing for the 1965 Formula One season was promising young Scot Jackie Stewart. In his very first race meeting for the team, the 1965 Race of Champions at Brands Hatch, Stewart used his P261 to immediately make his mark, taking second place in the overall aggregate positions after two heats. Stewart took his first outright race win in that year's International Trophy race. Fortunately for BRM, the car's late season lack of reliability had been cured by the time that the 1965 World Championship season began, and of the BRM P261's twenty Grand Prix starts only four did not result in a points-scoring finish. Hill again won in Monaco and the USA, while Stewart eventually took a closely contested Italian Grand Prix, his first ever World Championship race win in only his first Formula One season, wiping out memories of the previous year's humiliation at Monza. Again BRM took second spot in the constructors' standings at the season's end, with Hill and Stewart taking second and third, respectively, in the Drivers' Championship.

=== 1966 ===
Following the end of the 1965 World Championship season, BRM fitted two of their chassis with the enlarged, 1.9-litre version of the V8 engine, and shipped them to Australia and New Zealand to compete in the Tasman Series. Hill and Stewart accompanied them, along with substitute driver Richard Attwood, and immediately set about dominating the championship, despite the P261 giving away over half a litre to the older Climax-engined cars. The lead pair finished first and second at the season's opening race: the New Zealand Grand Prix. With Hill sitting out the remainder of the New Zealand rounds, Attwood proved an able replacement and took one win and a second place from his three race starts. On Hill's return to the team for the Australian rounds he picked up a second race win, and his results were strong enough for him to finish second in the Championship standing, beaten only by team-mate Stewart who had taken four wins from the series' eight-race schedule.

Back in Europe, only Brabham, Ferrari and Cooper had managed to secure a true 3-litre motor for their Formula One vehicles. Others, like BRM, were due to start the 1966 Formula One season with enlarged versions of their older engines. BRM did have the ambitious H16 engine in development, but for the first few races the team were forced to use the, by now two-year-old, P261. Despite this hindrance Jackie Stewart took first place at the season opening Monaco Grand Prix. However, when Jack Brabham's Brabham BT19 was on song, Hill and Stewart's P261s were outclassed, and were replaced by the H16-engined P83 for the season's final three races. Team Chamaco Collect entered American Bob Bondurant in five races, and British-born South African Vic Wilson in one. Wilson was the cousin of team boss Bernard White, who subsequently renamed his team to the less-exotic Bernard White Racing and entered a privateer P261 for Innes Ireland in the final two races of 1966, but he failed to finish on either occasion.

=== 1967–1969 ===
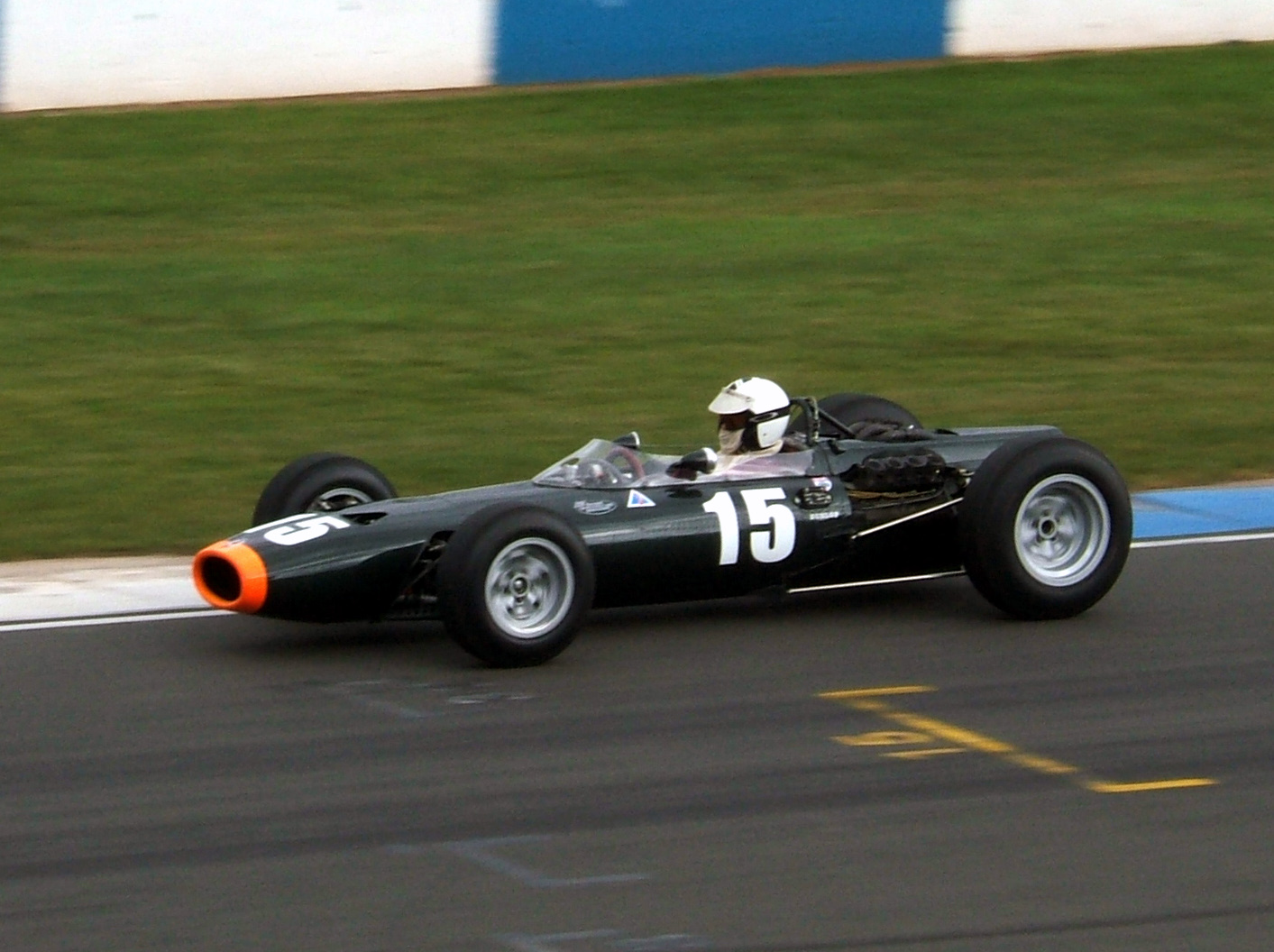
Richard Attwood driving a Formula One-specification, ex-Jackie Stewart BRM P261, identical (apart from engine capacity) to the cars the pair drove in the 1966 and 1967 Tasman Series races

Rather than sending the full works team down under for the 1967 Tasman Series season, BRM chose to lend their support to the private Reg Parnell Racing team. The Parnell team prepared two P261s, for works driver Stewart and previous year's race winner Richard Attwood. With the 2.1-litre V8 engine fitted, Stewart again made certain of a BRM victory in the season opening New Zealand GP. Despite scoring four straight podium finishes, Attwood was replaced by Piers Courage and Chris Irwin for the Australian rounds. Although Courage failed to make a mark, Irwin finished the season by taking third place in Longford. Stewart finished equal second in the series standings, but with fewer than half the points of Championship-winner Jim Clark.

Parnell continued to run a 2.1-litre P261 for Chris Irwin and Piers Courage during the subsequent 1967 Formula One season, and Bernard White ran another for David Hobbs at the British and Canadian Grands Prix. However, with the P83 now the main works car, the Bourne works team only fielded a P261 twice in the World Championship, although Stewart did manage third place at the 1967 French Grand Prix in his.

Pedro Rodríguez took a P261 back to the Tasman Series for one final time in the 1968 season, and he took second place at the Longford round. But with the widespread availability of the Cosworth DFV 3-litre V8 in the 1968 Formula One season there was little reason for running with an outclassed and underpowered old chassis in Europe beyond the end of 1967. Nevertheless, chassis number 2615 was fitted with the new BRM V12 engine, the H16's replacement, for a few non-Championship race entries. Its best result was third place in the Grand Prix de Madrid, although it was only the second race that the car managed to finish all year. Australian driver Frank Gardner attempted to qualify the V12 engined car for the 1968 Italian Grand Prix, but his time was too slow. Ian Mitchell's privateer P261 did appear in the British Formula 5000 Guards Trophy races in 1969, but he failed to finish a single race. Tony Dean drove a P261 in the 1969 Madrid Grand Prix at Jarama. Contemporary reports show that he finished second but only completed 39 out of 40 laps. Peter Gethin broke down on lap 40 and some later reports classify him as second.

=== World Championship results ===
(key) (results in bold indicate pole position)

Year	Entrant	Engine(s)	Tyres	Drivers	1	2	3	4	5	6	7	8	9	10	11	12	Pts.	WCC
1964	Owen Racing Organisation	BRM P56 1.5 V8	D		MON	NED	BEL	FRA	GBR	GER	AUT	ITA	USA	MEX			**42**	**2nd**
1964	Owen Racing Organisation	BRM P56 1.5 V8	D	Graham Hill	1	4	5	2	2	2	**Ret**	Ret	1	11			**42**	**2nd**
1964	Owen Racing Organisation	BRM P56 1.5 V8	D	Richie Ginther	2	11	4	5	8	7	2	4	4	8			**42**	**2nd**
1965	Owen Racing Organisation	BRM P56 1.5 V8	D		RSA	MON	BEL	FRA	GBR	NED	GER	ITA	USA	MEX			**45**	**2nd**
1965	Owen Racing Organisation	BRM P56 1.5 V8	D	Graham Hill	3	**1**	**5**	5	2	**4**	2	2	**1**	Ret			**45**	**2nd**
1965	Owen Racing Organisation	BRM P56 1.5 V8	D	Jackie Stewart	6	3	2	2	5	2	Ret	1	Ret	Ret			**45**	**2nd**
1966	Owen Racing Organisation	BRM P60 2.0 V8	D		MON	BEL	FRA	GBR	NED	GER	ITA	USA	MEX				**22**	**4th**
1966	Owen Racing Organisation	BRM P60 2.0 V8	D	Graham Hill	3	Ret	Ret	3	2	4							**22**	**4th**
1966	Owen Racing Organisation	BRM P60 2.0 V8	D	Jackie Stewart	1	Ret		Ret	4	5							**22**	**4th**
1966	Team Chamaco Collect	BRM P60 2.0 V8	G	Bob Bondurant	4	Ret		9		Ret	7						**22**	**4th**
1966	Team Chamaco Collect	BRM P60 2.0 V8	G	Vic Wilson		DNS											**22**	**4th**
1966	Bernard White Racing	BRM P60 1.9 V8	D	Innes Ireland								Ret	Ret				**22**	**4th**
1967	Owen Racing Organisation	BRM P60 2.1 V8	G		RSA	MON	NED	BEL	FRA	GBR	GER	CAN	ITA	USA	MEX		**17**^{1}	**6th**^{1}
1967	Owen Racing Organisation	BRM P60 2.1 V8	G	Jackie Stewart		Ret			3								**17**^{1}	**6th**^{1}
1967	Reg Parnell Racing	BRM P60 2.1 V8	F	Piers Courage		Ret				DNS							**17**^{1}	**6th**^{1}
1967	Reg Parnell Racing	BRM P60 2.1 V8	F	Chris Irwin				Ret		7							**17**^{1}	**6th**^{1}
1967	Bernard White Racing	BRM P60 2.1 V8	G	David Hobbs						8		9					**17**^{1}	**6th**^{1}
1968	Bernard White Racing	BRM P101 3.0 V12	G		RSA	ESP	MON	BEL	NED	FRA	GBR	GER	ITA	CAN	USA	MEX	**28**	**5th**
1968	Bernard White Racing	BRM P101 3.0 V12	G	Frank Gardner									DNQ				**28**	**5th**

^1 This total includes points scored by BRM P83 cars

=== Non-championship results ===
(key) (results in bold indicate pole position; results in italics indicate fastest lap)

Year	Entrant	Engine	Tyres	Drivers	1	2	3	4	5	6	7	8
1964	Owen Racing Organisation	BRM P56 1.5 V8	D		DMT	NWT	SYR	AIN	INT	SOL	MED	RAN
1964	Owen Racing Organisation	BRM P56 1.5 V8	D	Graham Hill	Ret	Ret		2	2	Ret		
1964	Owen Racing Organisation	BRM P56 1.5 V8	D	Richie Ginther	DNA			DNS	DNA			
1964	Owen Racing Organisation	BRM P56 1.5 V8	D	Richard Attwood						DNA		
1965	Owen Racing Organisation	BRM P56 1.5 V8	D		ROC	SYR	SMT	INT	MED	RAN		
1965	Owen Racing Organisation	BRM P56 1.5 V8	D	Graham Hill	NC		2	Ret				
1965	Owen Racing Organisation	BRM P56 1.5 V8	D	Jackie Stewart	2		**Ret**	1				
1966	Team Chamaco Collect	BRM P60 2.0 V8	G		RSA	SYR	INT	OUL				
1966	Team Chamaco Collect	BRM P60 2.0 V8	G	Vic Wilson		4	9					
1966	Bernard White Racing	BRM P60 1.9 V8	D	Innes Ireland				4				
1967	Reg Parnell Racing	BRM P60 2.1 V8	F		ROC	SPC	INT	SYR	OUL	ESP		
1967	Reg Parnell Racing	BRM P60 2.1 V8	F	Mike Spence			6	Ret				
1968	Bernard White Racing	BRM P101 3.0 V12	G		ROC	INT	OUL					
1968	Bernard White Racing	BRM P101 3.0 V12	G	David Hobbs	9	6	6					
1968	Motor Racing Stable	BRM P60 2.1 V8		Tony Lanfranchi			5					
1969	A. G. Dean	BRM P101 3.0 V12			ROC	INT	MAD	OUL				
1969	A. G. Dean	BRM P101 3.0 V12		Tony Dean			2					
1969	B.A. Moore	BRM P101 3.0 V12		Charles Lucas				Ret				

=== Tasman Series results ===
(key) (Races in bold indicate pole position; results in italics indicate fastest lap)

Year	Entrant	Driver	Engine	1	2	3	4	5	6	7	8
1966	Owen Racing Organisation		BRM P60; 1.9 V8	PUK	LEV	WIG	TER	WAR	LAK	SAN	LON
1966	Owen Racing Organisation	Jackie Stewart	BRM P60; 1.9 V8	2	Ret	**1**	1	(4)	**Ret**	1	**1**
1966	Owen Racing Organisation	Graham Hill	BRM P60; 1.9 V8	1				2	1	(3)	2
1966	Owen Racing Organisation	Richard Attwood	BRM P60; 1.9 V8		1	2	Ret				
1967	Owen Racing Organisation		BRM P111; 2.1 V8	PUK	LEV	WIG	TER	LAK	WAR	SAN	LON
1967	Owen Racing Organisation	Jackie Stewart	BRM P111; 2.1 V8	**1**	2	**Ret**	Ret	Ret	**1**	Ret	Ret
1967	Owen Racing Organisation	Richard Attwood	BRM P111; 2.1 V8	3	3	2	2				
1967	Owen Racing Organisation	Piers Courage	BRM P111; 2.1 V8					Ret			
1967	Owen Racing Organisation	Chris Irwin	BRM P111; 2.1 V8						Ret	4	3
1968	Owen Racing Organisation		BRM P111; 2.1 V8	PUK	LEV	WIG	TER	SUR	WAR	SAN	LON
1968	Owen Racing Organisation	Pedro Rodriguez	BRM P111; 2.1 V8	Ret		6			6		2
