= Bernard White Racing =

Motor racing team

- Full name: Bernard White Racing
- Base: Walkington, East Yorkshire, England
- Founder(s): (United Kingdom) Bernard White
- Noted drivers: (United Kingdom) Innes Ireland (United Kingdom) David Hobbs (Australia) Frank Gardner

Formula One World Championship career
- First entry: 1966 United States Grand Prix
- Races entered: 5
- Constructors: BRM
- Engines: BRM
- Race victories: 0
- Pole positions: 0
- Fastest laps: 0
- Final entry: 1968 Italian Grand Prix

Bernard White Racing was a motor racing team from the United Kingdom. The team was founded by Bernard White and raced in Formula One between 1966 and 1968 using a BRM P261.

In 1966 the team entered cars at the 1966 Monaco Grand Prix with Bob Bondourant driving who came in fourth place, then team's best performance. United States Grand Prix and the Mexican Grand Prix with the Scottish driver Innes Ireland, retiring from both races. They also entered the 1966 International Gold Cup, a non-Championship race in which Innes Ireland finished fourth.

In 1967, the team entered two races with David Hobbs. At the British Grand Prix Hobbs finished eighth, and at the Canadian Grand Prix he finished in ninth place. They also entered Hobbs for the 1967 Syracuse Grand Prix but withdrew their car before the race weekend began.

In 1968 Bernard White entered all three non-championship races with Hobbs. At the Race of Champions Hobbs finished ninth. He finished sixth in both the BRDC International Trophy and the International Gold Cup. The team's last Formula One race was the 1968 Italian Grand Prix for which Frank Gardner failed to qualify.

In 1965 Bernard White entered his ex Maranello Concessionaires Ferrari 250LM (5907) at Mallory Park and Angola (Vic Wilson) and in 1966 at the Daytone Continental driven by Vic Wilson and Denny Hulme and at Brands Hatch and Zeltweg (David Hobbs) and then at Kyalami driven by Mike Hailwood and Bob Anderson. In addition Bernard White entered his ex-Essex Wire Ford GT40 (P/1001)during 1966 at Croft, Brands Hatch, Zeltweg, Kyalami, Cape Town, Rhodesia, Lourenco Marques, Pietermaritzburg, variously driven by Alan Rees, Innes Ireland, David Hobbs, Mike Spence and Mike Hailwood.

== Complete Formula One World Championship results ==
(key)

Year	Entrant	Chassis	Engine(s)	Tyres	Drivers	1	2	3	4	5	6	7	8	9	10	11	12
1966	Bernard White Racing	BRM P261	BRM P60 1.9 V8	D		MON	BEL	FRA	GBR	NED	GER	ITA	USA	MEX			
1966	Bernard White Racing	BRM P261	BRM P60 1.9 V8	D	(United Kingdom) Innes Ireland								Ret	Ret			
1966	Team Chamaco Collect	BRM P261	BRM P60 1.9 V8	D	(United States) Bob Bondurant	4	Ret		9		Ret	7					
1966	Team Chamaco Collect	BRM P261	BRM P60 1.9 V8	D	(United Kingdom) Vic Wilson		DNS										
1967	Bernard White Racing	BRM P261	BRM P60 2.1 V8	G		RSA	MON	NED	BEL	FRA	GBR	GER	CAN	ITA	USA	MEX	
1967	Bernard White Racing	BRM P261	BRM P60 2.1 V8	G	(United Kingdom) David Hobbs						8		9				
1968	Bernard White Racing	BRM P261	BRM P101 3.0 V12	G		RSA	ESP	MON	BEL	NED	FRA	GBR	GER	ITA	CAN	USA	MEX
1968	Bernard White Racing	BRM P261	BRM P101 3.0 V12	G	(Australia) Frank Gardner									DNQ			

=== Non-championship F1 results ===
Year	Entrant	Chassis	Engine(s)	Drivers	1	2	3	4
1966	Team Chamaco Collect	BRM P261	BRM P60 1.9 V8	(United Kingdom) Vic Wilson	RSA	SYR; 4	INT; Ret	OUL
1966	Bernard White Racing	BRM P261	BRM P60 1.9 V8	(United Kingdom) Innes Ireland	RSA	SYR	INT	OUL; 4
1968	Bernard White Racing	BRM P261	BRM P101 3.0 V12	(United Kingdom) David Hobbs	ROC; 9	INT; 6	OUL; 6	
