= 1965 New Zealand Grand Prix =

- Race 1 of 8 in 1965 Tasman Series
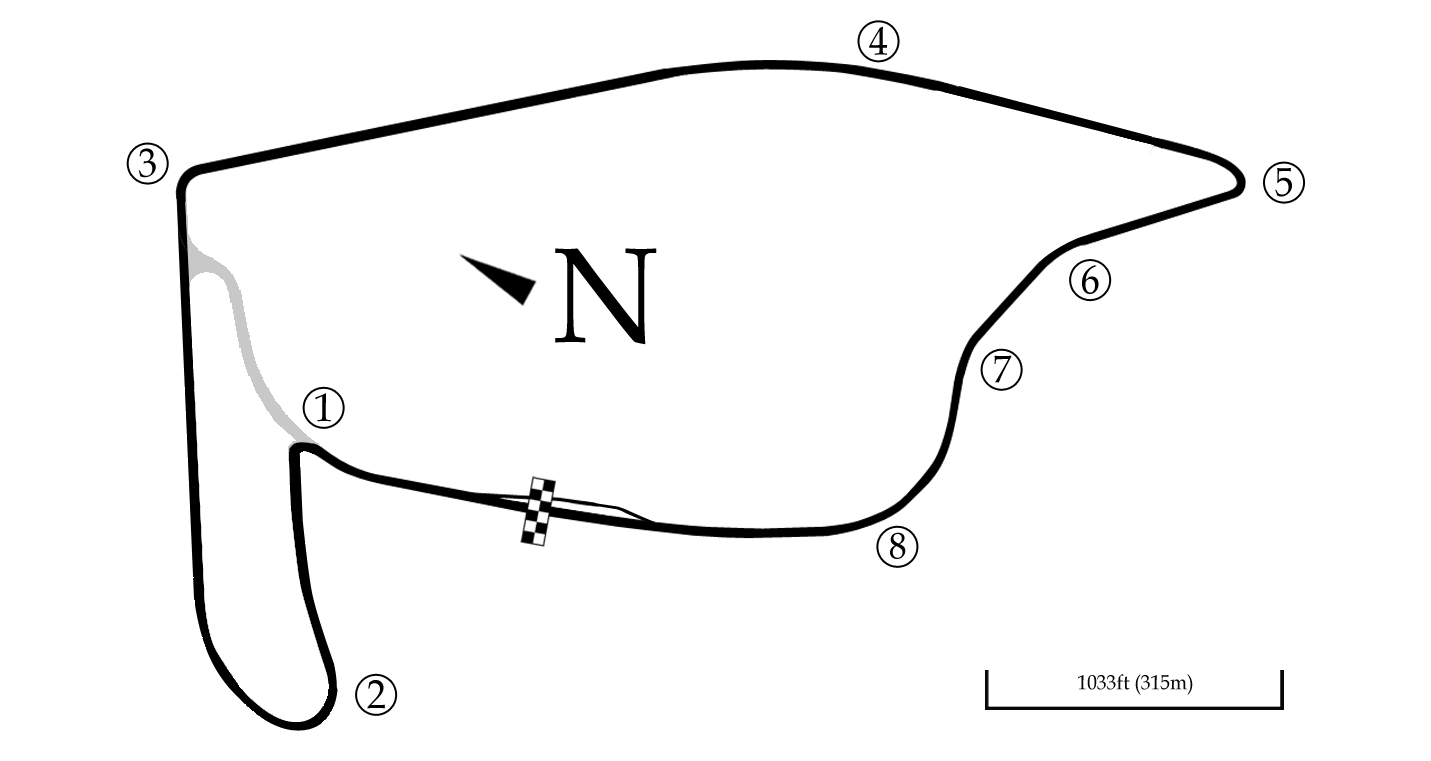

Race details
- Date: 9 January 1965
- Location: Pukekohe Park Raceway, Pukekohe, New Zealand
- Course: Permanent racing facility
- Course length: 3.5 km (2.2 miles)
- Distance: 50 laps, 175 km (110 miles)
- Weather: Sunny

Pole position
Driver	(United Kingdom) Graham Hill	Brabham-Climax

Fastest lap
Driver	(United Kingdom) Graham Hill	Brabham-Climax
- Time: 1'26.3

Podium
First	(United Kingdom) Graham Hill	Brabham-Climax
Second	(Australia) Frank Gardner	Brabham-Climax
Third	(New Zealand) Jim Palmer	Brabham-Climax

The 1965 New Zealand Grand Prix was a motor race held at the Pukekohe Park Raceway on 9 January 1965. The race was held over 50 laps of the 3.5 km (2.2 mi) combined circuit for a total distance of 175 km (110 mi). The Grand Prix was run for open wheel racing cars, specifically conforming to either the 2.5 litre Tasman Formula regulations or the 1.6 litre New Zealand National Formula regulations.

It was the 12th New Zealand Grand Prix, doubled as the opening round of the 1965 Tasman Series. The race attracted 19 starters, including several overseas based drivers and teams. A large contingent of cars from Australia competed, including Frank Gardner competing for Alec Mildren Racing. Lex Davison and Leo Geoghegan brought across their own teams, while 1962 Formula One world champion, British racer Graham Hill race a Brabham for David McKay's Scuderia Veloce team. Star attraction though was the appearance of Team Lotus with their lead driver, 1963 World Champion, Jim Clark. Local honour was upheld by Bruce McLaren, who in an early iteration of the later McLaren team brought a pair of factory supported Coopers to race with American racer, the 1961 World Champion Phil Hill as his number two. The race was won by Graham Hill, his first victory in the NZGP. Gardner finished second to be the first 'antipodean' while first New Zealander was domestic series racer Jim Palmer in a career highlight as Brabham racing cars clean swept the podium.

== Classification ==
Results as follows:

Pos	No.	Driver	Team	Car	Laps	Time	Points
1	2	(United Kingdom) Graham Hill	Scuderia Veloce	Brabham BT11A / Climax FPF 2.5	50	1h 13m 43.4s	9
2	11	(Australia) Frank Gardner	Alec Mildren Racing	Brabham BT11A / Climax FPF 2.5	50	1h 15m 06.3s	6
3	41	(New Zealand) Jim Palmer	George Palmer	Brabham BT7A / Climax FPF 2.5	49		4
4	17	(New Zealand) John Riley	John Riley	Lotus 18/21 / Climax FPF 2.5	47		3
5	25	(New Zealand) Rex Flowers	Rex Flowers	Lola Mk4 / Climax FPF 2.5	47		2
6	16	(Australia) Leo Geoghegan	Team Total	Lotus 32 / Ford 1.5	47		1
7	8	(New Zealand) Andy Buchanan	Andy Buchanan	Brabham BT6 / Ford 1.5	46		
8	15	(New Zealand) Red Dawson	Bruce McLaren Racing	Cooper T53 / Climax FPF 2.5	46		
9	14	(Australia) Kerry Grant	Lesco Racing	Lotus 22 / Ford 1.5	46		
10	9	(New Zealand) Bill Thomasen	Corsair Racing Team	Brabham BT4 / Climax FPF 2.5	45		
11	10	(New Zealand) Dene Hollier	Dene Hollier Ltd.	Lotus 20B / Ford 1.5	43		
12	20	(New Zealand) Ken Smith	Ken Smith	Lotus 22 / Ford 1.5	41		
13	12	(New Zealand) Roly Levis	Roly Levis	Brabham BT6 / Ford 1.5	40		
14		(New Zealand) Bill Stone	Bill Stone	Cooper T52 / Ford 1.5	39		
Ret	5	(Australia) Lex Davison	Ecurie Australie	Brabham BT4 / Climax FPF	33		
Ret	4	(New Zealand) Bruce Abernethy	Rothmans Driver Scheme	Cooper T66 / Climax FPF 2.5	32		
Ret	48	(New Zealand) Bruce McLaren	Bruce McLaren Racing	Cooper T70/79 / Climax FPF	13		
Ret	6	(Australia) Arnold Glass	Capitol Motors	Cooper T55 / Climax FPF 2.5	3		
Ret	1	(United Kingdom) Jim Clark	Team Lotus	Lotus 32B / Climax FPF	2		
DNS	48	(United States) Phil Hill	Bruce McLaren Racing	Cooper T70/79 / Climax FPF			

== Notes ==
- Pole position: Graham Hill
- Fastest lap: Graham Hill - 1'26.3

Preceded by 1964 South Pacific Trophy	Tasman Series; 1965	Succeeded by 1965 Levin International
Preceded by 1964 New Zealand Grand Prix	New Zealand Grand Prix; 1965	Succeeded by 1966 New Zealand Grand Prix
