= 1967 New Zealand Grand Prix =

- Race 1 of 6 in 1967 Tasman Series
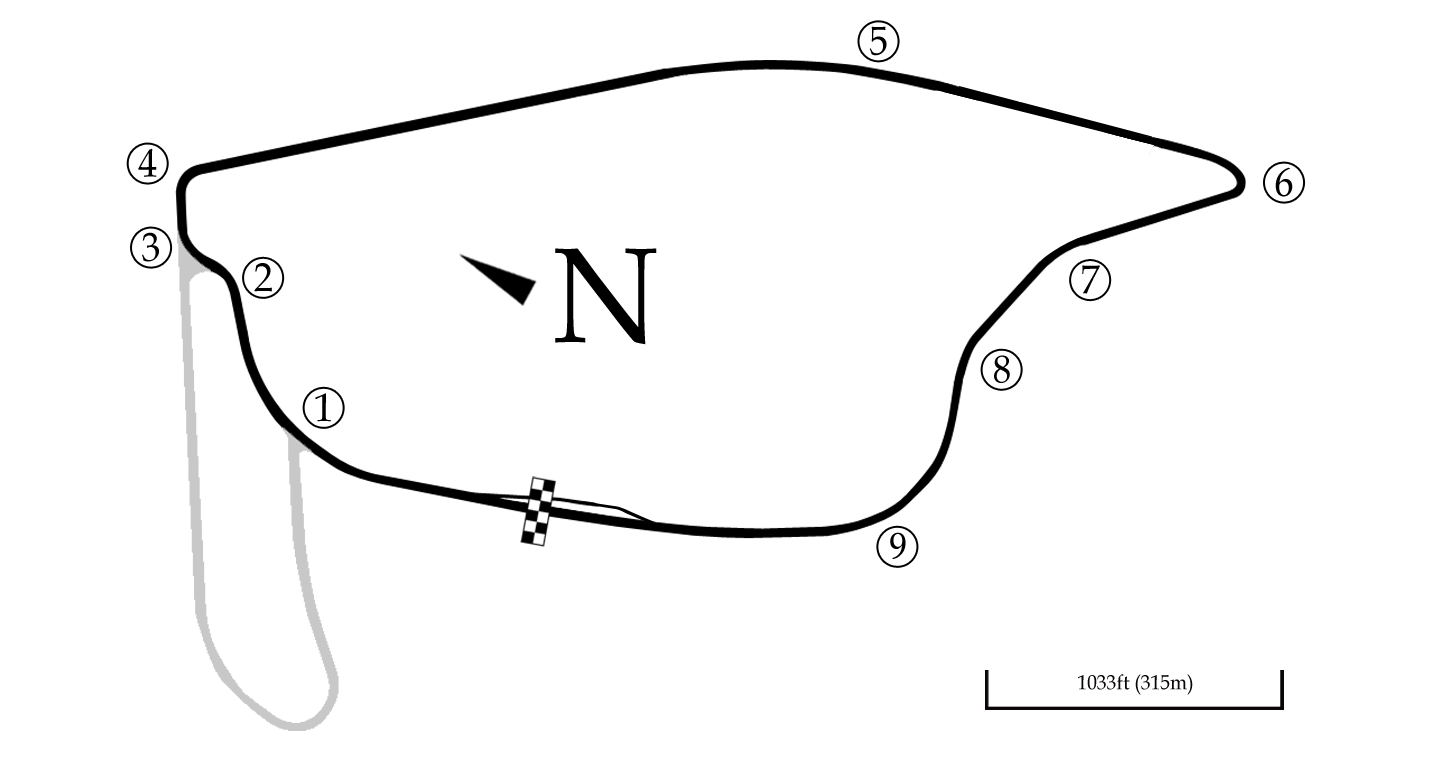

Race details
- Date: 7 January 1967
- Location: Pukekohe Park Raceway, Pukekohe, New Zealand
- Course: Permanent racing facility
- Course length: 2.82 km (1.76 miles)
- Distance: 57 laps, 161 km (100 miles)
- Weather: Sunny

Pole position
Driver	(United Kingdom) Jim Clark	Lotus-Climax
- Time: Determined by heats

Fastest lap
Driver	(United Kingdom) Jim Clark	Lotus-Climax
- Time: 1'00.5

Podium
First	(United Kingdom) Jackie Stewart	BRM
Second	(United Kingdom) Jim Clark	Lotus-Climax
Third	(United Kingdom) Richard Attwood	BRM

The 1967 New Zealand Grand Prix was a race held at the Pukekohe Park Raceway on 7 January 1967. The race had 19 starters.

It was the 14th New Zealand Grand Prix, and doubled as the opening round of the 1967 Tasman Series. Jackie Stewart won his only NZGP, becoming the last British driver to win the event until Lando Norris in 2016.

== Classification ==
Results as follows:

Pos	No.	Driver	Team	Car	Laps	Time	Points
1	2	(United Kingdom) Jackie Stewart	R.H.H. Parnell	BRM P261 / BRM V8 2.1	57	59m 16.4s	9
2	6	(United Kingdom) Jim Clark	Team Lotus	Lotus 33 / Coventry Climax FWMV V8 2.0	57	59m 20.9s	6
3	1	(United Kingdom) Richard Attwood	R.H.H. Parnell	BRM P261 / BRM V8 2.1	56		4
4	41	(New Zealand) Jim Palmer	Jim Palmer Racing	Brabham BT22 / Coventry Climax FPF 2.5	54		3
5	14	(New Zealand) Graeme Lawrence	Graeme Lawrence	Brabham BT18 / Ford 1.5	52		2
6	19	(New Zealand) Dene Hollier	Dene Hollier	Lotus 27 / Ford 1.5	50		1
7	60	(New Zealand) Jim Boyd	Syd Jensen	Brabham BT4 / Coventry Climax FPF 2.5	50		
8	24	(New Zealand) Bill Stone	Roly Levis	Brabham BT6 / Ford 1.5	50		
9	12	(New Zealand) Roly Levis	Roly Levis	Brabham BT18 / Ford 1.5	49		
10	15	(New Zealand) Ken Sager	J.H. Sager	Brabham BT16 / Ford 1.5	49		
11	20	(New Zealand) Laurence Brownlie	Laurence Brownlie	Brabham BT6 / Ford 1.5	45		
12	36	(New Zealand) John Weston	John Weston	Brabham BT6 / Ford 1.5			
13	29	(New Zealand) Don McDonald	Don McDonald	Brabham BT10 / Ford 1.5			
??	11	(New Zealand) Ken Smith	Ken Smith	Lotus 22 / Ford 1.5			
??	16	(New Zealand) Grahame Harvey	Grahame Harvey	Brabham BT6 / Ford 1.5			
??	30	(New Zealand) Pat McLoughlin	Pat McLoughlin	Cooper T53 / Coventry Climax FPF 2.5			
Ret	3	(New Zealand) Denny Hulme	Rorstan Motor Racing	Brabham BT7A / Coventry Climax FPF 2.5	50	Stub axle	
Ret	8	(Australia) Kevin Bartlett	Alec Mildren Racing	Brabham BT11A / Coventry Climax FPF 2.5	28		
Ret	18	(New Zealand) Dennis Marwood	Ecurie Rothmans	Cooper T66 / Coventry Climax FPF 2.5	24		
Ret	4	(Australia) Jack Brabham	Brabham Racing Org.	Brabham BT19 / Repco-Brabham V8 2.5	5		
DNS	5	(New Zealand) Red Dawson	Red Dawson	Brabham BT7A / Coventry Climax FPF 2.5			
DNS	7	(Australia) Frank Gardner	Alec Mildren Racing	Brabham BT23B / Coventry Climax FPF 2.5			
DNS	27	(New Zealand) Kerry Grant	Kerry Grant	Brabham BT11 / Coventry Climax FPF 2.5			
DNS		(New Zealand) Bill Thomasen	Red Dawson	Brabham BT4 / Coventry Climax FPF 2.5			

Preceded by 1966 South Pacific Trophy	Tasman Series; 1967	Succeeded by 1967 Lady Wigram Trophy
Preceded by 1966 New Zealand Grand Prix	New Zealand Grand Prix; 1967	Succeeded by 1968 New Zealand Grand Prix
