= 1966 New Zealand Grand Prix =

- Race 1 of 8 in 1966 Tasman Series
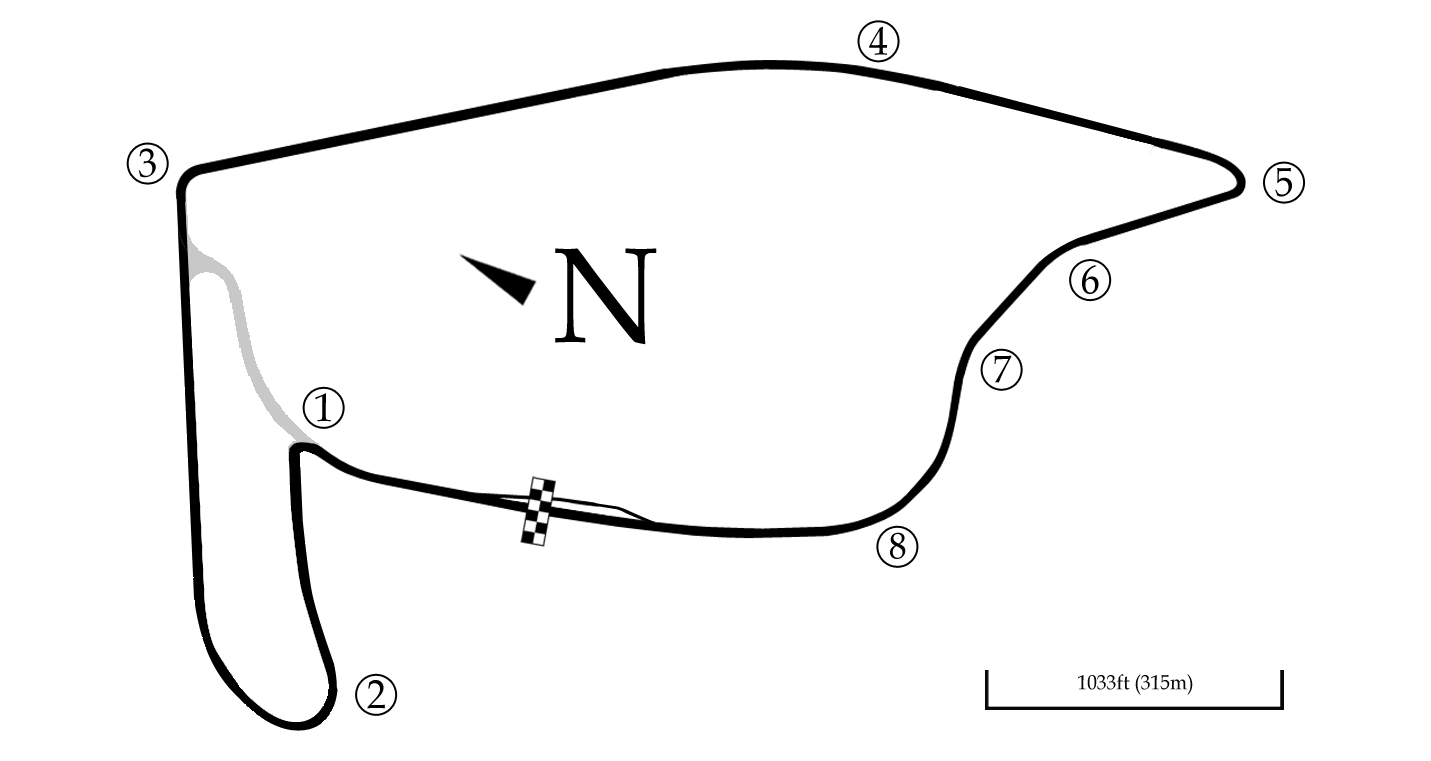

Race details
- Date: 8 January 1966
- Location: Pukekohe Park Raceway, Pukekohe, New Zealand
- Course: Permanent racing facility
- Course length: 2.82 km (1.76 miles)
- Distance: 40 laps, 113 km (70 miles)
- Weather: Sunny

Pole position
Driver	(United Kingdom) Graham Hill	BRM
- Time: 1'25.2

Fastest lap
Driver	(United Kingdom) Graham Hill	BRM
- Time: 1'25.7

Podium
First	(United Kingdom) Graham Hill	BRM
Second	(United Kingdom) Jackie Stewart	BRM
Third	(New Zealand) Jim Palmer	Lotus-Climax

The 1966 New Zealand Grand Prix was a race held at the Pukekohe Park Raceway on 8 January 1966. The race had 19 starters.

It was the 13th New Zealand Grand Prix, and doubled as the opening round of the 1966 Tasman Series. Graham Hill won his second consecutive NZGP.

== Classification ==
Results as follows:

Pos	No.	Driver	Team	Car	Laps	Time	Points
1	2	(United Kingdom) Graham Hill	Owen Racing Organisation	BRM P261 / BRM 1.9	40	1h 02m 56.5s	9
2	6	(United Kingdom) Jackie Stewart	Owen Racing Organisation	BRM P261 / BRM 1.9	40	1h 02m 58.0s	6
3	41	(New Zealand) Jim Palmer	George Palmer	Lotus 32B / Climax FPF 2.5	38		4
4	3	(New Zealand) Dennis Marwood	Ecurie Rothmans	Cooper T66 / Climax FPF 2.5	38		3
5	7	(Australia) Leo Geoghegan	Team Total	Lotus 32 / Ford 1.5	37		2
6	15	(New Zealand) Ken Sager	J.H. Sager	Brabham BT9 / Ford 1.5	37		1
7	5	(New Zealand) Red Dawson	Red Dawson	Brabham BT7a / Climax FPF 2.5	37		
8	12	(New Zealand) Roly Levis	Roly Levis	Brabham BT6 / Ford 1.5	37		
9	9	(New Zealand) Dene Hollier	Dene Hollier	Lotus 20B / Ford 1.5	37		
10	29	(New Zealand) Neil Whittaker	Lesco Racing	Brabham BT4 / Climax FPF 2.5	37		
11	20	(New Zealand) Ray Thackwell	Team Tiki	Brabham BT2 / Ford 1.5	36		
12	12	(New Zealand) Ken Smith	Ken Smith	Lotus 22 / Ford 1.5	36		
Ret	17	(New Zealand) John Riley	John Riley	Lotus 18/21 / Climax FPF 2.5	21		
Ret	24	(New Zealand) Bill Stone	Bill Stone	Cooper T52 / Ford 1.5	7		
Ret	14	(New Zealand) Graeme Lawrence	Lawrence Motors	Brabham BT6 / Ford 1.5	7		
Ret	1	(United Kingdom) Jim Clark	Team Lotus	Lotus 39 / Climax FPF 2.5	6		
Ret	4	(Australia) Frank Gardner	Alec Mildren Racing	Brabham BT11A / Climax FPF 2.5	0		
Ret	8	(New Zealand) Andy Buchanan	Wilson Motors	Brabham BT7a / Climax FPF 2.5	0		
Ret	11	(Australia) Spencer Martin	Scuderia Veloce	Brabham BT11a / Climax FPF 2.5	0		
DNS	31	(New Zealand) Bill Caldwell	W. Caldwell	Brabham BT6 / Ford 1.5			

Preceded by 1965 South Pacific Trophy	Tasman Series; 1966	Succeeded by 1966 Levin International
Preceded by 1965 New Zealand Grand Prix	New Zealand Grand Prix; 1966	Succeeded by 1967 New Zealand Grand Prix
