= 1966 Australian Grand Prix =

Coordinates: 27.2279°S 152.9650°E

- Race 6 of 8 in 1966 Tasman Series
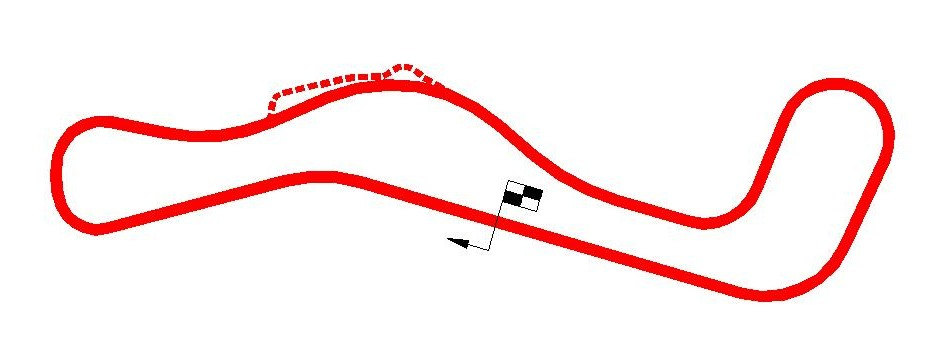

Race details
- Date: 20 February 1966
- Location: Lakeside Raceway, Brisbane, Queensland, Australia
- Course: Permanent racing facility
- Course length: 2.4 km (1.5 miles)
- Distance: 66 laps, 158.4 km (99 miles)
- Weather: Sunny

Pole position
| Driver | (United Kingdom) Jackie Stewart | BRM |
- Time: 0'55.5

Fastest lap
| Driver | (United Kingdom) Jackie Stewart (United Kingdom) Graham Hill | BRM; BRM |
- Time: 0'55.9

Podium
| First | (United Kingdom) Graham Hill | BRM |
| Second | (Australia) Frank Gardner | Brabham-Climax |
| Third | (United Kingdom) Jim Clark | Lotus-Climax |

The 1966 Australian Grand Prix was a motor race staged on 20 February 1966 at the Lakeside Circuit in Queensland, Australia. The race, which had 15 starters, was open to Racing Cars complying with the Australian National Formula or the Australian 1½ Litre Formula. It was both the 31st Australian Grand Prix and race 6 of the 1966 Tasman Championship for Drivers.

Graham Hill won the race driving BRM P261. It was his only Australian Grand Prix victory.

== Classification ==
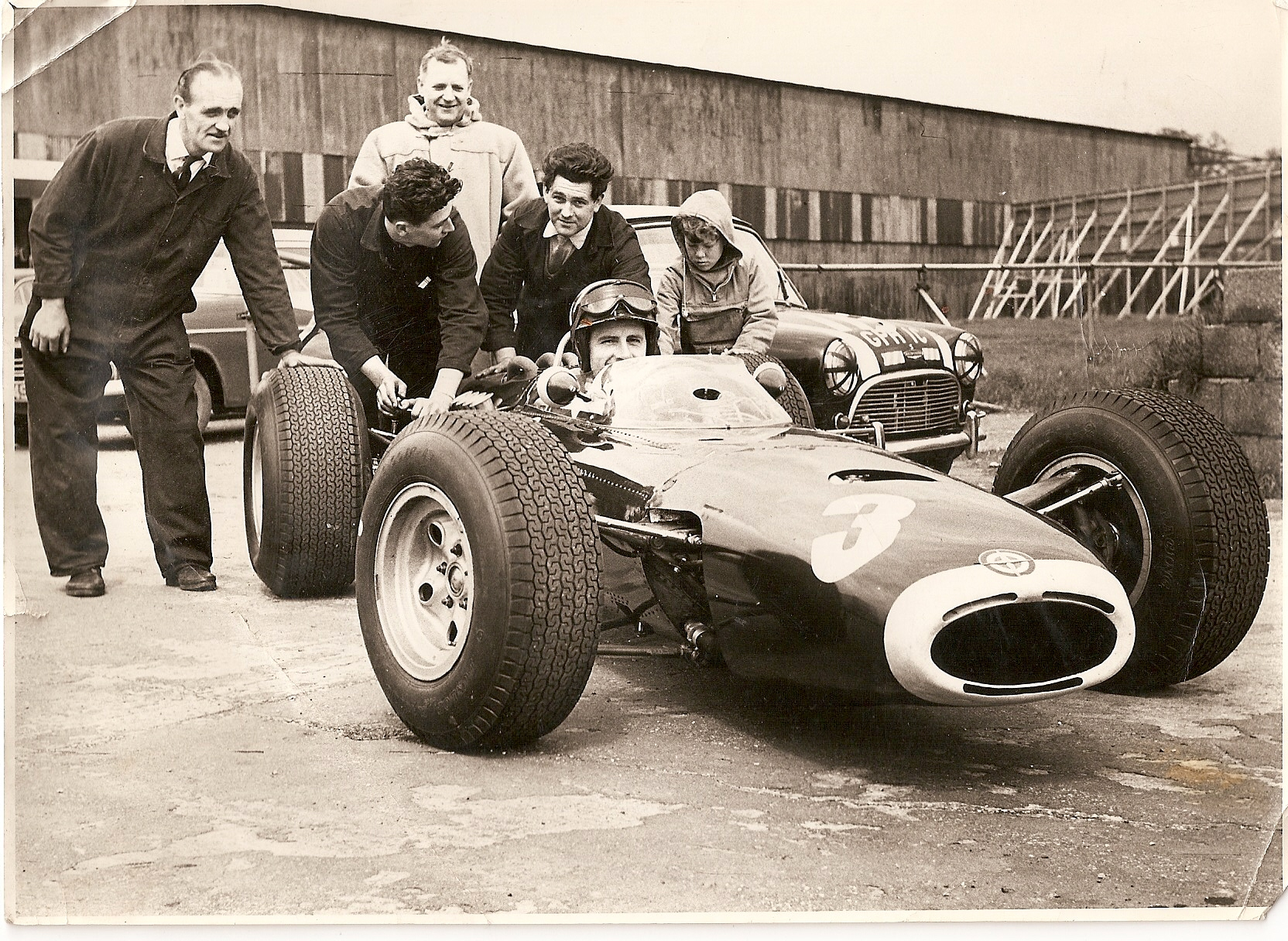
Graham Hill won the race driving a BRM P261 (1965 image)

Results as follows:

| Pos | No. | Driver | Entrant | Car / Engine | Laps | Time |
|---|---|---|---|---|---|---|
| 1 | 2 | (United Kingdom) Graham Hill | Owen Racing Organisation | BRM P261 / BRM V8 1.9 | 66 | 1h 02m 38.0s |
| 2 | 4 | (Australia) Frank Gardner | Alec Mildren Racing P/L | Brabham BT11A / Climax FPF | 66 | 1h 02m 55.0s |
| 3 | 1 | (United Kingdom) Jim Clark | Team Lotus | Lotus 39 / Climax FPF | 66 | 1h 02m 57.0s |
| 4 | 17 | (New Zealand) Jim Palmer | Jim Palmer Motor Racing | Lotus 32B / Climax FPF | 64 | |
| 5 | 14 | (Australia) Kevin Bartlett | Alec Mildren Racing P/L | Repco Brabham BT2 / Ford 1.5 | 63 | |
| 6 | 20 | (Australia) Glyn Scott | Glyn Scott Motors | Lotus 27 / Ford 1.5 | 63 | |
| 7 | 16 | (New Zealand) Andy Buchanan | Wilson Motors | Repco Brabham BT7A / Climax FPF | 63 | |
| 8 | 6 | (Australia) John Harvey | R.C. Phillips Sports Car World | Repco Brabham BT14 / Ford 1.5 | 62 | |
| 9 | 5 | (Australia) Leo Geoghegan | Total Team | Lotus 32 / Ford 1.5 | 39 | Bent Wishbone |
| Ret | 11 | (Australia) Spencer Martin | Scuderia Veloce | Repco Brabham BT11A / Climax FPF | 47 | Fuel Pump |
| Ret | 7 | (Australia) Greg Cusack | Greg Cusack | Repco Brabham BT10 / Ford 1.5 | 30 | Accident |
| Ret | 3 | (United Kingdom) Jackie Stewart | Owen Racing Organisation | BRM P261 / BRM V8 1.9 | 28 | Gearbox |
| Ret | 26 | (Australia) Mel McEwin | Mel McEwin | Elfin Mono / Ford 1.5 | 26 | Fuel Pump |
| Ret | 19 | (Australia) John McDonald | Bill Patterson Motors | Cooper T70/79 / Climax FPF | 23 | Water Pump |
| Ret | 9 | (New Zealand) Dennis Marwood | Ecurie Rothmans | Cooper T66 / Climax FPF | 7 | Oil Pressure |
| DNQ | 23 | (Australia) Paul Bolton | Town & Country Garage | Repco Brabham BT6 / Ford 1.5 | | |
| DNQ | 25 | (Australia) Les Howard | Howard & Sons Racing Team | Lotus 27 / Ford 1.5 | | |
| DNQ | 50 | (Australia) Bob Jane | Autoland Pty. Ltd. | Elfin Mono / Ford 1.5 | | |
| DNQ | 21 | (New Zealand) Roly Levis | R.A. Levis | Brabham BT6 / Ford 1.5 | | |
| DNQ | 44 | (Australia) Max Stewart | Max Stewart Motors | Rennmax BN1 / Ford 1.5 | | |
| DNQ | 10 | (Australia) Peter Williamson | J. McGuire | Elfin FJ / Hillman 1.0 | | |

== Notes ==
- Pole position: Jackie Stewart – 0'55.5
- Fastest lap: Jackie Stewart / Graham Hill – 0'55.9

| Preceded by 1966 Warwick Farm International | Tasman Series; 1966 | Succeeded by 1966 Sandown International |
| Preceded by 1965 Australian Grand Prix | Australian Grand Prix; 1966 | Succeeded by 1967 Australian Grand Prix |
