= 1966 Tasman Series =

Motorsport series in Australia and New Zealand

The 1966 Tasman Championship for Drivers was a motor racing competition for racing cars complying with the Tasman Formula. The championship was jointly organised by the Association of New Zealand Car Clubs Inc. and the Confederation of Australian Motor Sport. It began on 8 January 1966 and ended on 7 March after eight races, four of which were staged in New Zealand and the remainder in Australia. The winning driver was declared Tasman Champion and was awarded the Tasman Cup.

The championship, which was the third Tasman Series, was won by Jackie Stewart driving a BRM P261.

== Races ==
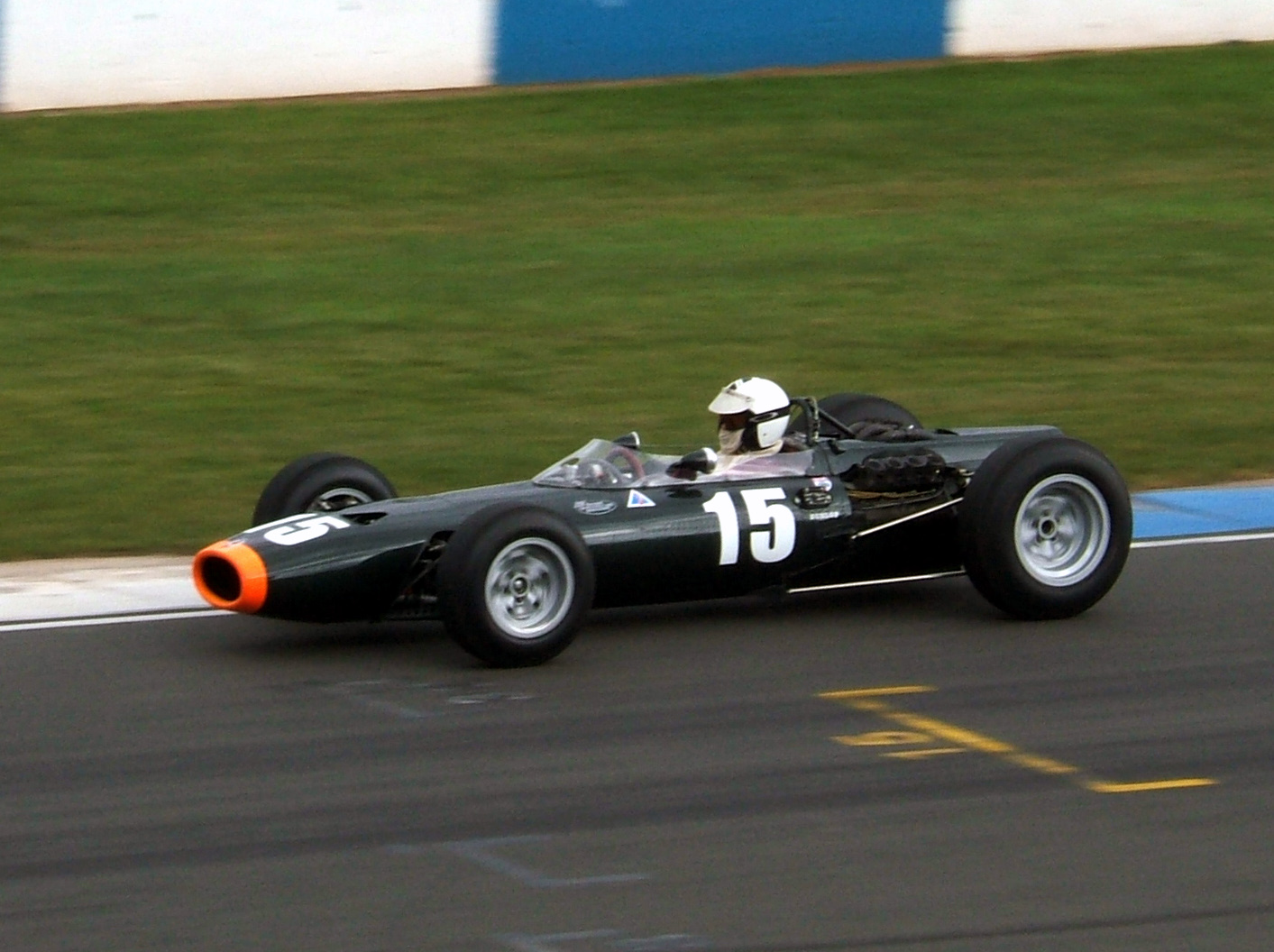
Jackie Stewart won the championship driving a BRM P261 similar to that shown above

The championship was contested over eight races.

Round		Name	Circuit	Date	Winning driver	Winning car	Winning team	Report
New Zealand	1	New Zealand Grand Prix	Pukekohe	8 January	(United Kingdom) Graham Hill	BRM P261	Owen Racing Organisation	Report
New Zealand	2	Levin International	Levin	15 January	(United Kingdom) Richard Attwood	BRM P261	Owen Racing Organisation	Report
New Zealand	3	Lady Wigram Trophy	Wigram	22 January	(United Kingdom) Jackie Stewart	BRM P261	Owen Racing Organisation	Report
New Zealand	4	Teretonga International	Teretonga	29 January	(United Kingdom) Jackie Stewart	BRM P261	Owen Racing Organisation	Report
Australia	5	Warwick Farm International	Warwick Farm	13 February	(United Kingdom) Jim Clark	Lotus 39 Coventry Climax	Team Lotus	Report
Australia	6	Australian Grand Prix	Lakeside	20 February	(United Kingdom) Graham Hill	BRM P261	Owen Racing Organisation	Report
Australia	7	Exide International Cup	Sandown	27 February	(United Kingdom) Jackie Stewart	BRM P261	Owen Racing Organisation	Report
Australia	8	South Pacific Trophy	Longford	7 March	(United Kingdom) Jackie Stewart	BRM P261	Owen Racing Organisation	Report

== Points system ==
Points were awarded on the following basis at each race.

Position	1st	2nd	3rd	4th	5th	6th
Points	9	6	4	3	2	1

Each driver could retain points won in the New Zealand Grand Prix and in any other two races in New Zealand plus points won in the Australian Grand Prix and in any in other two races in Australia.

== Championship standings ==
Pos	Driver	Car	Entrant	Puk	Lev	Wig	Ter	War	Lak	San	Lon	Pts
1	(United Kingdom) Jackie Stewart	BRM P261	Owen Racing Organisation	2	Ret	1	1	(4)	Ret	1	1	42 (45)
2	(United Kingdom) Graham Hill	BRM P261	Owen Racing Organisation	1				2	1	(3)	2	30 (34)
3	(United Kingdom) Jim Clark	Lotus 39 Coventry Climax	Team Lotus	Ret	2	Ret	Ret	1	3	2	7	25
4	(New Zealand) Jim Palmer	Lotus 32B Coventry Climax	Jim Palmer	3	(5)	3	3	(6)	4	4	4	21 (24)
5	(Australia) Frank Gardner	Repco Brabham BT11A Coventry Climax	Alec Mildren Racing Pty Ltd	Ret	Ret	Ret	2	3	2	5	(6)	18 (19)
6	(United Kingdom) Richard Attwood	BRM P261	Owen Racing Organisation		1	2	Ret					15
7	(Australia) Spencer Martin	Repco Brabham BT11A Coventry Climax	Scuderia Veloce	Ret	3	4	Ret	5	Ret	Ret	5	11
8	(New Zealand) Dennis Marwood	Cooper T66 Coventry Climax	Ecurie Rothmans	4	7	6	4	10	Ret			7
9	(New Zealand) Roly Levis	Brabham BT6 Ford	R Levis	8	4	7	5	11	DNQ			5
10	(Australia) Jack Brabham	Repco Brabham BT19	Ecurie Vitesse							Ret	3	4
11	(Australia) Leo Geoghegan	Lotus 32 Ford	Total Team	5				7	Ret	Ret		2
=	(New Zealand) Andy Buchanan	Repco Brabham BT7A Coventry Climax	Wilson Motors, Hunterville	Ret	9	5	Ret	DNS	7			2
=	(New Zealand) Ken Sager	Brabham BT6 Ford		6	8	Ret	6					2
=	(Australia) Kevin Bartlett	Repco Brabham BT2 Ford	Alec Mildren Racing Pty Ltd					Ret	5	8		2
15	(New Zealand) Red Dawson	Brabham BT7 Coventry Climax		7	6	Ret	Ret					1
=	(Australia) Glyn Scott	Lotus 27 Ford	Glyn Scott Motors					Ret	6			1
=	(Australia) Les Howard	Lotus 27 Ford	Howard & Sons Racing Team					13	DNQ	6		1
—	(New Zealand) John Riley	Lotus 18/21 Coventry Climax		Ret	DNQ	Ret	7					0
—	(Australia) Greg Cusack	Repco Brabham BT10 Ford	Team Castrol					Ret	Ret	7		0
—	(New Zealand) Dene Hollier	Lotus 20B Ford		9	Ret	8	8					0
—	(Australia) John Harvey	Repco Brabham BT10 Ford	RC Phillips Sports Car World P/L					8	8	Ret		0
—	(New Zealand) Peter Gillum	Cooper T67 Ford				9	10					0
—	(New Zealand) Ray Thackwell	Brabham BT2 Ford	Team Tiki	11	Ret	Ret	9					0
—	(Australia) Bob Jane	Elfin Mono Mk I Ford	Autoland Pty Ltd					9				0
—	(New Zealand) Ken Smith	Lotus 22 Ford		12	10							0
—	(New Zealand) Neil Whittaker	Brabham BT4 Coventry Climax	Lesco Racing Team	10	DNQ							0
—	(New Zealand) Allan Rhodes	Lotus 18 Ford				Ret	11					0
—	(New Zealand) Tony Shaw	Lotus 22 Ford					12					0
—	(Australia) Peter Williamson	Elfin Junior Hillman Imp	J McGuire					12				0
—	(New Zealand) Bill Stone	Cooper T52 Ford		Ret								0
—	(New Zealand) Graeme Lawrence	Brabham BT6 Ford		Ret	DNS	Ret	Ret					0
—	(New Zealand) Bill Caldwell	Brabham BT6 Ford		DNS	Ret	Ret	Ret					0
—	(Australia) Mel McEwin	Elfin Mono Ford	M McEwin					Ret	Ret	Ret		0
—	(Australia) Don O'Sullivan	Cooper T53 Coventry Climax	FD O'Sullivan					Ret		Ret		0
—	(Australia) John McDonald	Cooper T70 Coventry Climax	Bill Patterson Motors					Ret	Ret	Ret	Ret	0
—	(Australia) Don Fraser	Cooper T53 BRM	D Fraser							Ret		0
—	(New Zealand) Bryan Innes	Lotus 22 Ford	JC Wilson	DNS								0
—	(Australia) Paul Bolton	Repco Brabham BT6 Ford	Town & Country Garage Pty Ltd					DNS				0
—	(Australia) Max Stewart	Rennmax BN1 Ford	Max Stewart Motors					DNS				0
Pos	Driver	Car	Entrant	Puk	Lev	Wig	Ter	War	Lak	San	Lon	Pts

Colour	Result
Gold	Winner
Silver	Second place
Bronze	Third place
Green	Points classification
Blue	Non-points classification
Blue	Non-classified finish (NC)
Purple	Retired, not classified (Ret)
Red	Did not qualify (DNQ)
Red	Did not pre-qualify (DNPQ)
Black	Disqualified (DSQ)
White	Did not start (DNS)
White	Withdrew (WD)
White	Race cancelled (C)
Blank	Did not practice (DNP)
Blank	Did not arrive (DNA)
Blank	Excluded (EX)
