= 1968 New Zealand Grand Prix =

- Race 1 of 8 in 1968 Tasman Series
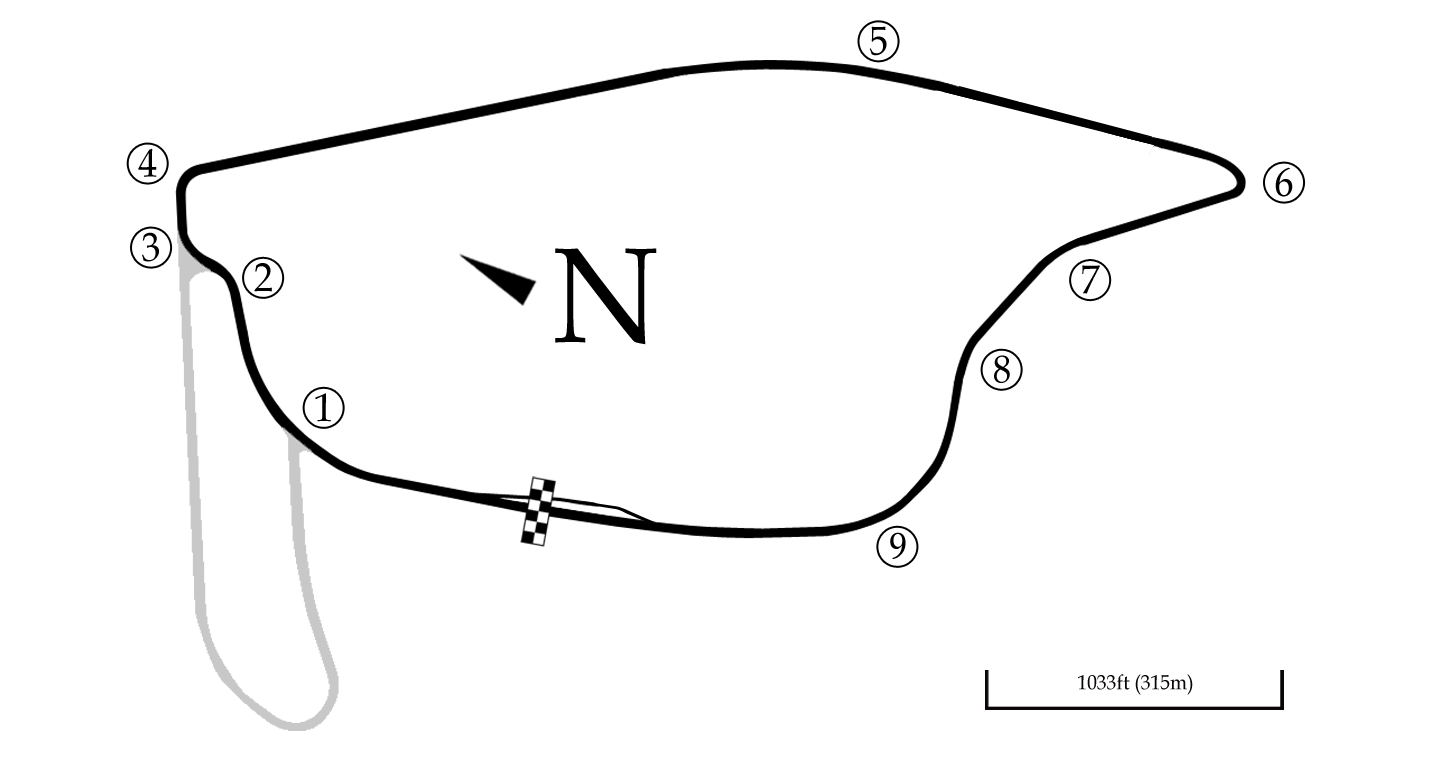

Race details
- Date: 6 January 1968
- Location: Pukekohe Park Raceway, Pukekohe, New Zealand
- Course: Permanent racing facility
- Course length: 2.82 km (1.76 miles)
- Distance: 58 laps, 164 km (102 miles)
- Weather: Sunny

Pole position
Driver	(United Kingdom) Jim Clark	Lotus-Cosworth
- Time: 1'00.0

Fastest lap
Driver	(New Zealand) Chris Amon	Ferrari
- Time: 59.3

Podium
First	(New Zealand) Chris Amon	Ferrari
Second	(Australia) Frank Gardner	Brabham-Alfa Romeo
Third	(United Kingdom) Piers Courage	McLaren-Cosworth

The 1968 New Zealand Grand Prix was a race held at the Pukekohe Park Raceway on 6 January 1968. The race had 21 starters.

It was the 15th New Zealand Grand Prix, and doubled as the opening round of the 1968 Tasman Series. Chris Amon became the third New Zealander to win his home GP, joining Bruce McLaren and original GP winner John McMillan.

== Classification ==
Results as follows:

Pos	No.	Driver	Team	Car	Laps	Time	Points
1	4	(New Zealand) Chris Amon	Chris Amon	Dino 246 Tasmania / Ferrari V6 2.4	58	59m 20.1s	9
2	7	(Australia) Frank Gardner	Alec Mildren Racing	Brabham BT23D / Alfa Romeo V8 2.5	58	59m 57.8s	6
3	8	(United Kingdom) Piers Courage	Piers Courage	McLaren M4A / Cosworth FVA 1.6	57		4
4	41	(New Zealand) Jim Palmer	Jim Palmer Racing	McLaren M4A / Cosworth FVA 1.6	55		3
5	5	(Australia) Paul Bolton	Rorstan Motor Racing	Brabham BT22 / Climax FPF 2.5	45		2
6	14	(New Zealand) Graeme Lawrence	Lawrence Racing	Brabham BT18 / Ford 1.5	53		1
7	57	(New Zealand) Bryan Faloon	Bryan Faloon	Brabham BT4 / Climax FPF 2.5	52		
8	12	(New Zealand) Roly Levis	Shaw Motors	Brabham BT18 / Ford 1.5	51		
9	19	(New Zealand) John Nicholson	John Nicholson	Lotus 27 / Ford 1.5	51		
10	24	(New Zealand) Bill Stone	Bill Stone	Brabham BT6 / Ford 1.5	50		
11	29	(New Zealand) Don McDonald	Don McDonald	Brabham BT10 / Ford 1.5	49		
12	11	(New Zealand) Ken Smith	Ken Smith	Lotus 41B / Ford 1.5	49		
Ret	3	(New Zealand) Denny Hulme	Racing Team S.A.	Brabham BT23A / Cosworth FVA 1.6	56		
Ret	20	(New Zealand) Laurence Brownlie	Laurence Brownlie	Brabham BT18/21 / Ford 1.5	53		
Ret	6	(United Kingdom) Jim Clark	Team Lotus	Lotus 49T / Cosworth DFV V8 2.5	45		
Ret	5	(New Zealand) Red Dawson	Red Dawson	Brabham BT7a / Climax FPF 2.5	45		
Ret	2	(Mexico) Pedro Rodríguez	Owen Racing Organisation	BRM P261 / BRM V8 2.1	30		
Ret	1	(New Zealand) Bruce McLaren	Owen Racing Organisation	BRM P126 / BRM V12 2.5	15		
Ret	18	(New Zealand) David Oxton	S. Oxton	Brabham BT16 / Ford 1.5	15		
Ret	17	(New Zealand) Vince Anderson	Vince Anderson	Brabham BT11a / Climax FPF 2.5	9		
Ret	10	(New Zealand) Peter Yock	Peter Yock	Lotus 33 / BRM V8 2.0	8		

Preceded by 1967 South Pacific Trophy	Tasman Series; 1968	Succeeded by 1968 Levin International
Preceded by 1967 New Zealand Grand Prix	New Zealand Grand Prix; 1968	Succeeded by 1969 New Zealand Grand Prix
