= 1967 Australian Grand Prix =

- Race 4 of 6 in 1967 Tasman Series
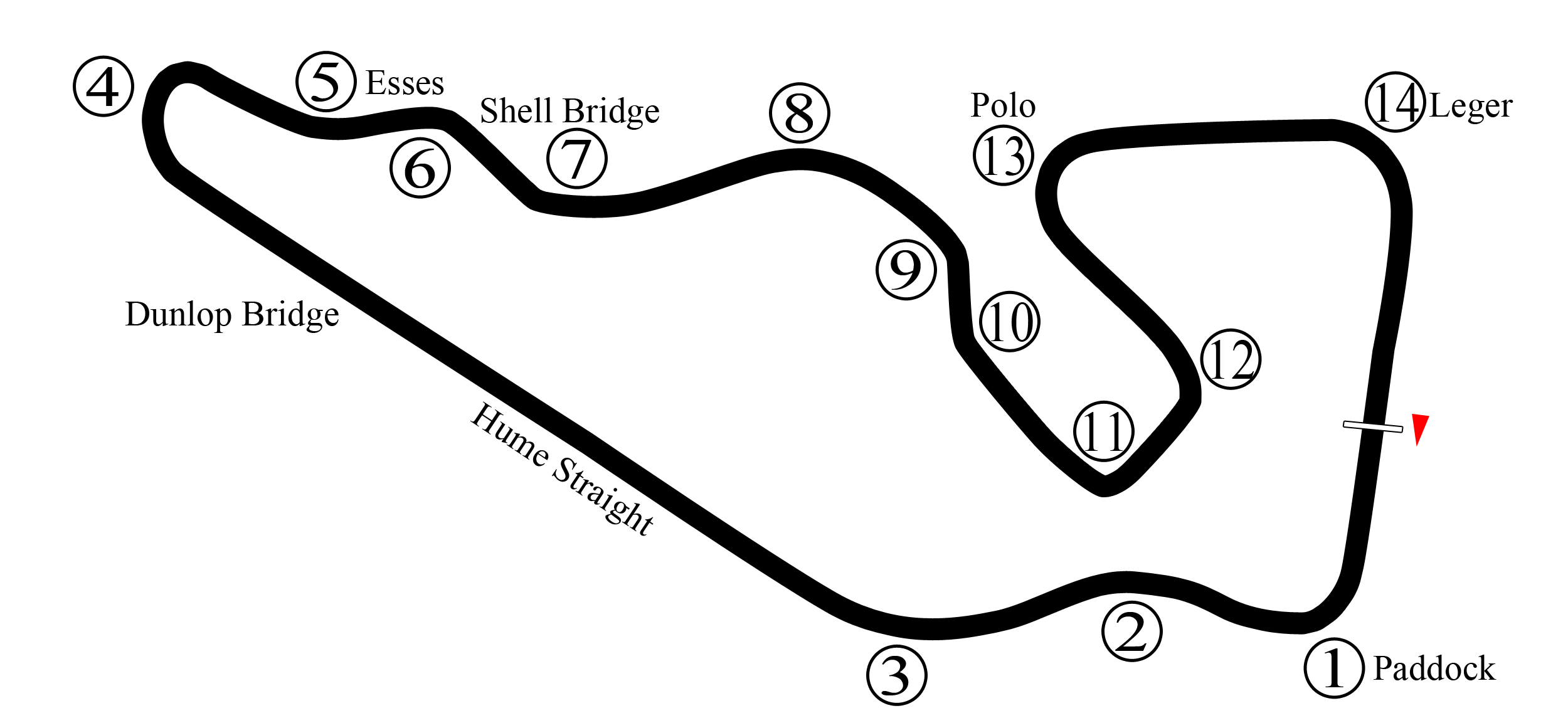

Race details
- Date: 19 February 1967
- Location: Warwick Farm Raceway, Sydney, New South Wales, Australia
- Course: Permanent racing facility
- Course length: 3.621 km (2.25 miles)
- Distance: 45 laps, 162.945 km (101.25 miles)
- Weather: Sunny

Pole position
Driver	(United Kingdom) Jackie Stewart	BRM
- Time: 1'30.8

Fastest lap
Driver	(United Kingdom) Jackie Stewart	BRM
- Time: 1'31.4

Podium
First	(United Kingdom) Jackie Stewart	BRM
Second	(United Kingdom) Jim Clark	Lotus-Climax
Third	(Australia) Frank Gardner	Brabham-Climax

The 1967 Australian Grand Prix was a motor race held over 45 laps of the 3.621 km (2.25 mi) Warwick Farm Raceway in Sydney, New South Wales, Australia on 19 February 1967. It was promoted by the Australian Automobile Racing Co. Pty. Ltd. The race, which was open to Australian National Formula and Australian 1½ Litre Formula cars, had 15 starters.

The race was the thirty-second Australian Grand Prix and the fourth round of the 1967 Tasman Series. Jackie Stewart started the race on pole in a BRM P261 and drove the race's fastest lap. Tasman Series points leader Jim Clark finished second in a Lotus 33, with Australian driver Frank Gardner third in a Repco Brabham BT16. Reigning World Champion Driver, Jack Brabham, finished fourth in his Repco Brabham BT23A.

In his victory presentation speech, New South Wales Governor Sir Roden Cutler VC AK KCMG KCVO CBE aptly named the 1967 AGP as the "Scottish Grand Prix" after Scotsmen Jackie Stewart and Jim Clark finished 1–2.

== Classification ==
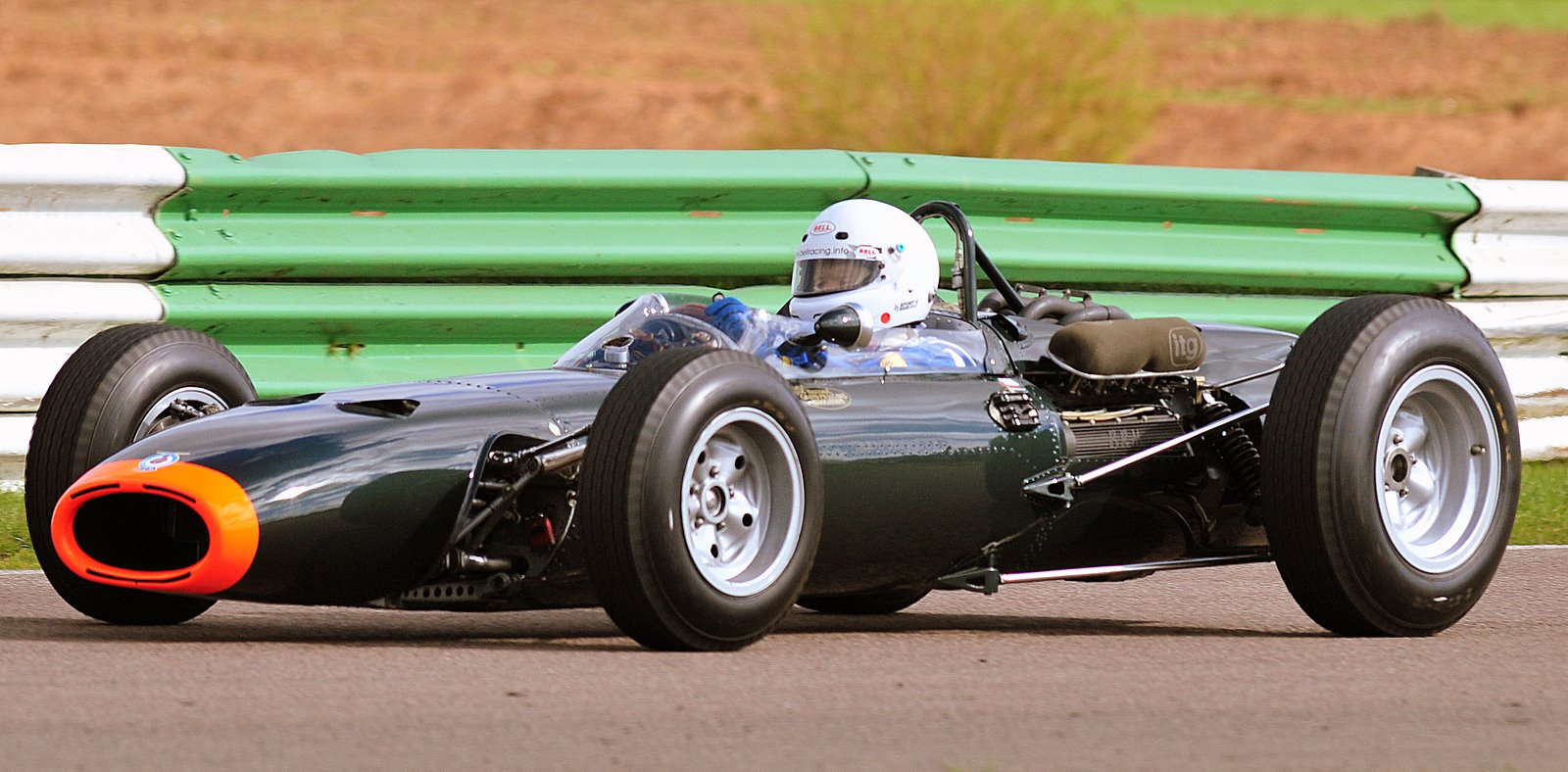
Jackie Stewart won the race driving a BRM P261 similar to that pictured above

Results as follows:

Pos	No.	Driver	Entrant	Car / Engine	Laps	Time
1	3	(United Kingdom) Jackie Stewart	Owen Racing Organisation	BRM P261 / BRM V8 2.1	45	1h 09m 17.3s
2	6	(United Kingdom) Jim Clark	Team Lotus (Overseas) Ltd	Lotus 33 / Coventry Climax FWMV V8 2.0	45	1h 09m 34.0s
3	8	(Australia) Frank Gardner	Alec Mildren Racing Pty Ltd	Repco Brabham BT16 / Coventry Climax FPF 2.5	45	1h 10m 28.9s
4	1	(Australia) Jack Brabham	Ecurie Vitesse	Repco Brabham BT23A / Repco V8 2.5	45	1h 10m 43.6s
5	11	(Australia) Leo Geoghegan	Geoghegan Racing Division	Lotus 39 / Coventry Climax FPF 2.5	44	
6	7	(Australia) Kevin Bartlett	Alec Mildren Racing Pty Ltd	Repco Brabham BT11A / Coventry Climax FPF 2.5	43	
7	20	(Australia) Glyn Scott	Glyn Scott Motors	Lotus 27 / Ford 1.5	41	
8	18	(New Zealand) Mike Champion	Competition Cars	Repco Brabham BT2 / Ford 1.5	41	
Ret	9	(Australia) Spencer Martin	Bob Jane Racing Team	Repco Brabham BT11A / Coventry Climax FPF 2.5	43	Accident
Ret	2	(New Zealand) Denny Hulme	Ecurie Vitesse	Repco Brabham BT22 / Repco V8 2.5	41	Coolant Leak
Ret	4	(United Kingdom) Chris Irwin	Owen Racing Organisation	BRM P261 / BRM V8 2.1	39	Fuel Injection
Ret	5	(United Kingdom) Graham Hill	Team Lotus (Overseas) Ltd	Lotus 48 / Ford Cosworth FVA 1.6	25	Gearbox
Ret	15	(New Zealand) Paul Bolton	Stanton Motors	Repco Brabham BT7A / Coventry Climax FPF 2.5	20	Sealing Ring
Ret	19	(Australia) Ian Cook	Ian Cook	Elfin Mono Mark IIB / Ford 1.5	1	Clutch
Ret	21	(Australia) Mel McEwin	Mel McEwin	Elfin Mono Mark I / Ford 1.5	0	Clutch
DNS	10	(Australia) John Harvey	RC Phillips Sports Car World	Repco Brabham BT14 / Ford 1.8	–	Half-shaft

== Notes ==
- Pole position: Jackie Stewart – 1'30.8
- Winner's average speed: 87.67 mph (141.08 km/h)
- Fastest lap: Jackie Stewart, 1:34.4, 88.62 mph (142.61 km/h) - New Outright Record
- David Langridge Trophy (resident drivers cup): Leo Geoghegan

Preceded by 1967 Lakeside International	Tasman Series; 1967	Succeeded by 1967 Sandown International
Preceded by 1966 Australian Grand Prix	Australian Grand Prix; 1967	Succeeded by 1968 Australian Grand Prix
