= List of 1964 motorsport champions =

1964 motorsport champions
Previous: 1963	Next: 1965

This list of 1964 motorsport champions is a list of national or international auto racing series with a Championship decided by the points or positions earned by a driver from multiple races.

== Karting ==
Series	Driver	Season article
Karting World Championship	(Italy) Guido Sala	1964 Karting World Championship

== Motorcycle racing ==
Series	Rider	Season article
500cc World Championship	(United Kingdom) Mike Hailwood	1964 Grand Prix motorcycle racing season
350cc World Championship	(Rhodesia) Jim Redman	1964 Grand Prix motorcycle racing season
250cc World Championship	(United Kingdom) Phil Read	1964 Grand Prix motorcycle racing season
125cc World Championship	(Switzerland) Luigi Taveri	1964 Grand Prix motorcycle racing season
50cc World Championship	(New Zealand) Hugh Anderson	1964 Grand Prix motorcycle racing season
Motocross World Championship	500cc: (United Kingdom) Jeff Smith	1964 FIM Motocross World Championship
Motocross World Championship	250cc: (Belgium) Joël Robert	1964 FIM Motocross World Championship
Speedway World Championship	(New Zealand) Barry Briggs	1964 Individual Speedway World Championship

== Open wheel racing ==
Series	Driver	Season article
Formula One World Championship	(United Kingdom) John Surtees	1964 Formula One season
Formula One World Championship	Constructors: (Italy) Ferrari	1964 Formula One season
Australian Drivers' Championship	(Australia) Bib Stillwell	1964 Australian Drivers' Championship
Australian 1½ Litre Championship	(Australia) Greg Cusack	1964 Australian 1½ Litre Championship
Australian Formula 2 Championship	(Australia) Greg Cusack	1964 Australian Formula 2 Championship
Cup of Peace and Friendship	(Poland) Jerzy Jankowski	1964 Cup of Peace and Friendship
Cup of Peace and Friendship	Nations: East Germany	1964 Cup of Peace and Friendship
South African Formula One Championship	(Rhodesia) John Love	1964 South African Formula One Championship
Tasman Series	(New Zealand) Bruce McLaren	1964 Tasman Series
USAC National Championship	(United States) A. J. Foyt	1964 USAC Championship Car season
Formula Three
BRSCC British Formula 3 Championship	(United Kingdom) Rodney Banting	1964 British Formula Three season
BARC British Formula Three Championship	(United Kingdom) Jackie Stewart	1964 British Formula Three season
BARC British Formula Three Championship	Team: (United Kingdom) Tyrrell Racing	1964 British Formula Three season
SMRC British Formula 3 Championship	(Iceland) Sverrir Thoroddsson	1964 British Formula Three season
East German Formula Three Championship	(East Germany) Max Byczkowski	1964 East German Formula Three Championship
East German Formula Three Championship	LK II: (East Germany) Peter Bretschneider	1964 East German Formula Three Championship
French Formula Three Championship	(France) Henri Grandsire	
French Formula Three Championship	Team: (France) Automobiles Alpine	
Italian Formula Three Championship	(Italy) Giacomo "Geki" Russo	
Italian Formula Three Championship	Team: (Italy) Scuderia Sorocaima	
Soviet Formula 3 Championship	(Soviet Union) Vladimir Ptushkin	

== Rallying ==
Series	Drivers	Season article
British Rally Championship	(United Kingdom) Eric Jackson	1964 British Rally Championship
British Rally Championship	Co-Drivers: (United Kingdom) Ken Joseph	1964 British Rally Championship
Estonian Rally Championship	(Estonian Soviet Socialist Republic) Valdo Mägi	1964 Estonian Rally Championship
Estonian Rally Championship	Co-Drivers: (Estonian Soviet Socialist Republic) Kalju Nurme	1964 Estonian Rally Championship
European Rally Championship	(Sweden) Tom Trana	1964 European Rally Championship
European Rally Championship	Co-Drivers: (Sweden) Gunnar Thermanius	1964 European Rally Championship
European Rally Championship	Ladies: (United Kingdom) Pat Moss	1964 European Rally Championship
Finnish Rally Championship	(Finland) Simo Lampinen	1964 Finnish Rally Championship
Italian Rally Championship	(Italy) Arnaldo Cavallari	
Italian Rally Championship	Co-Drivers: (Italy) Sandro Munari	
Italian Rally Championship	Manufacturers: (Italy) Alfa Romeo	
South African National Rally Championship	(South Africa) Ewold van Bergen	
South African National Rally Championship	Co-Drivers: (South Africa) Rex Wakley-Smith	
Spanish Rally Championship	(Spain) Jaime Juncosa Jr.	

== Sports car and GT ==
Series	Driver	Season article
International Championship for GT Manufacturers	Class GT+2.0: (Italy) Ferrari; Class GT2.0: (West Germany) Porsche; Class GT1.3: (Italy) Abarth-Simca	1964 World Sportscar Championship
International Prototype Trophy	Class P+3.0: (Italy) Ferrari; Class P3.0: (West Germany) Porsche	1964 World Sportscar Championship
United States Road Racing Championship	(United States) Jim Hall	1964 United States Road Racing Championship
SCCA National Sports Car Championship	C Modified: (United States) Ed Lowther	1964 SCCA National Sports Car Championship
SCCA National Sports Car Championship	D Modified: (United States) Tom O'Brien	1964 SCCA National Sports Car Championship
SCCA National Sports Car Championship	A Production: (United States) Bob Johnson	1964 SCCA National Sports Car Championship

== Stock car racing ==
Series	Driver	Season article
NASCAR Grand National Series	(United States) Richard Petty	1964 NASCAR Grand National Series
NASCAR Grand National Series	Manufacturers: (United States) Ford	1964 NASCAR Grand National Series
NASCAR Pacific Coast Late Model Series	(United States) Ron Hornaday Sr.	1964 NASCAR Pacific Coast Late Model Series
ARCA Racing Series	(United States) Jack Bowsher	1964 ARCA Racing Series
Turismo Carretera	(Argentina) Dante Emiliozzi	1964 Turismo Carretera
USAC Stock Car National Championship	(United States) Parnelli Jones	1964 USAC Stock Car National Championship

== Touring car ==
Series	Driver	Season article
European Touring Car Challenge	(United Kingdom) Warwick Banks	
Australian Touring Car Championship	(Australia) Ian Geoghegan	1964 Australian Touring Car Championship
British Saloon Car Championship	(United Kingdom) Jim Clark	1964 British Saloon Car Championship

== See also ==
- List of motorsport championships
- Auto racing
