= Rodney Banting =

- Nationality: (United Kingdom) British
- Full name: Rodney Frederick Banting
- Born: May 1941
- Died: 1996 (aged 54–55) Solihull, United Kingdom

Swedish Formula 3 Championship
- Years active: 1965
- Teams: Stockbridge Racing
- Starts: 1
- Wins: 0
- Poles: 0
- Fastest laps: 0

Previous series
- 1965 1964-1965 1964 1962-1963: European Formula 3 European Formula 2 British Formula 3 British Formula Junior

Championship titles
- 1964: BRSCC British Formula 3 Championship

Rodney Frederick Banting (May 1941 – 1996) was a British racecar driver who won the 1964 BRSCC British Formula 3 Championship.

== Career ==
Banting started out racing in British Formula Junior, driving a privately entered Lotus 20. He advertised the Lotus 20 for sale in Autosport Magazine in March 1962 as he progressed into the Lotus 22 and later a Lotus 31. For 1963, he entered a Brabham BT6 and secured his best result at the 1963 British Formula Junior race at Mallory Park with third place.

In 1964, Banting moved into British Formula 3, and won the BRSCC British F3 Championship. By 1965, Banting had joined Stockbridge Racing and began competing in Europe driving in Formula 3 and Formula 2. He secured two podium finishes with a race win at the Grande Prémio de Portugal in July, driving a Cooper T76 and third in the Grand Prix de la Chatre driving a Lotus 22. The T76 he used to win the race was auctioned at the Bonhams Goodwood Revival auction in 2018.

Banting's final competitive championship race came in Swedish Formula 3 for Stockbridge, where he was a guest driver at Gelleråsen. He finished the race in third place.

In 1972, Banting started the Banting Earle Racing Team alongside Mike Earle. The team fielded Pygmee Ford's in the 1972 European Formula Two Championship with drivers Patrick dal Bo, Derek Bell and Carlos Pace.
