= T72 =

T72 may refer to:

- T-72, a Soviet tank
- Cooper T72, a racing car
- Hunter T 72, a British-built trainer aircraft
- INS Cheriyam (T72), a patrol vessel of the Indian Navy
- MV Derrycunihy (1943), impressed into the Royal Navy as Motor Transport Ship T72
