= 1962 in motorsport =

The following is an overview of the events of 1962 in motorsport including the major racing events, motorsport venues that were opened and closed during a year, championships and non-championship events that were established and disestablished in a year, and births and deaths of racing drivers and other motorsport people.

== Annual events ==
The calendar includes only annual major non-championship events or annual events that had own significance separate from the championship. For the dates of the championship events see related season articles.

Date	Event	Ref
11 February	3 Hours of Daytona	
18 February	1962 NHRA Winternationals	
18 February	4th Daytona 500	
6 May	46th Targa Florio	
27 May	World 600	
30 May	46th Indianapolis 500	
3 June	20th Monaco Grand Prix	
4–8 June	44th Isle of Man TT	
17 June	1962 Belgian Grand Prix	
23–24 June	30th 24 Hours of Le Mans	
4 July	Pike's Peak Hillclimb	
3 September	NHRA U.S. Nationals	
22 October	3rd Armstrong 500	
18 November	9th Macau Grand Prix	

== Births ==
Date	Month	Name	Nationality	Occupation	Note	Ref
12	January	Emanuele Pirro	Italian	Racing driver	24 Hours of Le Mans winner (2000-2002, 2006-2007).	
2	March	Gabriele Tarquini	Italian	Racing driver	Champion of BTCC in 1994, the ETCC in 2003 and the WTCC in 2009.	
7	March	Piero Liatti	Italian	Rally driver	1997 Monte Carlo Rally winner.	
18	March	Volker Weidler	German	Racing driver	24 Hours of Le Mans winner (1991).	
12	April	Carlos Sainz	Spanish	Rally driver	World Rally champion (1990, 1992).	
19	April	Al Unser Jr.	American	Racing driver	Indianapolis 500 winner (1992, 1994).	
28	September	Fred Merkel	American	Motorcycle racer	Superbike World champion (1988, 1989).	
23	December	Bertrand Gachot	Belgian-French	Racing driver	24 Hours of Le Mans winner (1991).	

== Deaths ==
Date	Month	Name	Age	Nationality	Occupation	Note	Ref
5	March	Libero Liberati	35	Italian	Motorcycle racer	500cc Grand Prix motorcycle racing World champion (1957).	
12	April	Ron Flockhart	38	British	Racing driver	24 Hours of Le Mans winner (1956, 1957).	
25	April	Fred Frame	67	American	Racing driver	Indianapolis 500 winner (1932).	
2	July	Peter Ryan	22	Canadian	Racing driver	The first Canadian Formula One driver.	
10	July	Tommy Milton	68	American	Racing driver	Indianapolis 500 winner (1921, 1923).	
1	November	Ricardo Rodríguez	20	Mexican	Racing driver	The first Mexican Formula One driver.	
21	December	Gary Hocking	25	Rhodesian	Motorcycle racer	500cc Grand Prix motorcycle racing World champion (1961).	

== See also ==
- List of 1962 motorsport champions
