= Cooper T85 =

The Cooper T85 was an open-wheel formula racing car, designed, developed and built by British manufacturer Cooper, for Formula Three racing categories, in 1967. It was their 16th and final Formula 3 car. It was powered by a 998 cc (60.9 cu in) BMC four-cylinder engine, developing around 88 hp (66 kW) @ 7,750 rpm, and had a 12.5:1 compression ratio. Only two models were produced. It used inboard front suspension, and was very similar in design to its predecessor. It is known to have entered one race at Brands Hatch in 1967, being driven by Les Leston, but did not end up finish the race. A Ford-powered version of the car entered a second race at Montlhéry in 1968, also without any success.
