= 1964 in motorsport =

The following is an overview of the events of 1964 in motorsport including the major racing events, motorsport venues that were opened and closed during a year, championships and non-championship events that were established and disestablished in a year, and births and deaths of racing drivers and other motorsport people.

== Annual events ==
The calendar includes only annual major non-championship events or annual events that had own significance separate from the championship. For the dates of the championship events see related season articles.

Date	Event	Ref
16 February	Daytona 2000 km	
23 February	6th Daytona 500	
26 April	48th Targa Florio	
10 May	22nd Monaco Grand Prix	
30 May	48th Indianapolis 500	
8–12 June	46th Isle of Man TT	
20–21 June	32nd 24 Hours of Le Mans	
25–26 July	16th 24 Hours of Spa	
4 October	5th Armstrong 500	
15 November	11th Macau Grand Prix	

== Births ==
Date	Month	Name	Nationality	Occupation	Note	Ref
1	June	Davy Jones	American	Racing driver	24 Hours of Le Mans winner (1996).	
11	June	Jean Alesi	French	Racing driver	1995 Canadian Grand Prix winner.	
19	June	Kevin Schwantz	American	Motorcycle racer	500cc Grand Prix motorcycle racing World champion (1993).	
25	June	Johnny Herbert	British	Racing driver	24 Hours of Le Mans winner (1991). Le Mans Series champion (2004).	
26	June	Tommi Mäkinen	Finnish	Rally driver	World Rally champion (1996-1999).	
13	July	Rinaldo Capello	Italian	Racing driver	24 Hours of Le Mans winner (2003-2004, 2008).	
2	August	Frank Biela	German	Racing driver	24 Hours of Le Mans winner (2000-2002, 2006-2007).	
22	September	Paul Bonhomme	British	Air racer	Red Bull Air World Race champion (2009-2010, 2015).	
28	October	Scott Russell	American	Motorcycle racer	Superbike World champion (1993).	

== Deaths ==
Date	Month	Name	Age	Nationality	Occupation	Note	Ref
7	January	Reg Parnell	52	British	Racing driver	1951 BRDC International Trophy winner.	
19	January	Joe Weatherly	41	American	Racing driver	NASCAR Grand National champion (1962, 1963)	
30	May	Eddie Sachs	37	American	Racing driver	2 time Indianapolis 500 polesitter (1960, 1961)	
30	May	Dave MacDonald	27	American	Racing driver	52 Road Racing victories	
2	July	Fireball Roberts	35	American	Racing driver	1962 Daytona 500 winner	
26	July	Earl Howe	80	British	Racing driver	24 Hours of Le Mans winner (1930).	

== See also ==
- List of 1964 motorsport champions
