= List of 1965 motorsport champions =

1965 motorsport champions
Previous: 1964	Next: 1966

This is a list of the winners of national and international auto racing championships and series which were contested during 1965.

== Drag racing ==
Series	Champion	Refer
NHRA Drag Racing Series	Top Fuel: (United States) Maynard Rupp	1965 NHRA Drag Racing Series
NHRA Drag Racing Series	Pro Stock: (United States) Gary Lawson	1965 NHRA Drag Racing Series

== Karting ==
Series	Driver	Season article
Karting World Championship	(Italy) Guido Sala	1965 Karting World Championship

== Motorcycle racing ==
Series	Rider	Season article
500cc World Championship	(United Kingdom) Mike Hailwood	1965 Grand Prix motorcycle racing season
350cc World Championship	(Rhodesia) Jim Redman	1965 Grand Prix motorcycle racing season
250cc World Championship	(United Kingdom) Phil Read	1965 Grand Prix motorcycle racing season
125cc World Championship	(New Zealand) Hugh Anderson	1965 Grand Prix motorcycle racing season
50cc World Championship	(United Kingdom) Ralph Bryans	1965 Grand Prix motorcycle racing season
Motocross World Championship	500cc: (United Kingdom) Jeff Smith	1965 FIM Motocross World Championship
Motocross World Championship	250cc: (Soviet Union) Victor Arbekov	1965 FIM Motocross World Championship
Speedway World Championship	(Sweden) Björn Knutson	1965 Individual Speedway World Championship

== Open wheel racing ==
Championship/Series	Driver	Season article
Formula One World Championship	(United Kingdom) Jim Clark	1965 Formula One season
Formula One World Championship	Constructors: (United Kingdom) Lotus-Climax	1965 Formula One season
Australian Drivers' Championship	(Australia) Bib Stillwell	1965 Australian Drivers' Championship
Australian 1½ Litre Championship	(Australia) Bib Stillwell	1965 Australian 1½ Litre Championship
Australian Formula 2 Championship	(Australia) Greg Cusack	1965 Australian Formula 2 Championship
Cup of Peace and Friendship	(East Germany) Heinz Melkus	1965 Cup of Peace and Friendship
Cup of Peace and Friendship	Nations: East Germany	1965 Cup of Peace and Friendship
South African Formula One Championship	(Rhodesia) John Love	1965 South African Formula One Championship
Tasman Series	(United Kingdom) Jim Clark	1965 Tasman Series
USAC National Championship	(United States) Mario Andretti	1965 USAC Championship Car season
Formula Three
BRSCC British Formula 3 Championship	(United Kingdom) Tony Dean	1965 British Formula Three season
BARC British Formula Three Championship	(United Kingdom) Roy Pike	1965 British Formula Three season
East German Formula Three Championship	(East Germany) Willy Lehmann	1965 East German Formula Three Championship
Italian Formula Three Championship	(Italy) Andrea de Adamich	
Italian Formula Three Championship	Teams: (Italy) Jolly Club	
French Formula Three Championship	(France) Jean-Pierre Beltoise	
French Formula Three Championship	Teams: (France) Equipe Matra Sports	
Soviet Formula 3 Championship	(Soviet Union) Georgy Surguchev	1965 Soviet Formula 3 Championship

== Rallying ==
Series	Drivers	Season article
British Rally Championship	(United Kingdom) Roger Clark	1965 British Rally Championship
British Rally Championship	Co-Drivers: (United Kingdom) Jim Porter	1965 British Rally Championship
Estonian Rally Championship	(Estonian Soviet Socialist Republic) Avo Tilga	1965 Estonian Rally Championship
Estonian Rally Championship	Co-Drivers: (Estonian Soviet Socialist Republic) Väino Nemvalts	1965 Estonian Rally Championship
European Rally Championship	(Finland) Rauno Aaltonen	1965 European Rally Championship
European Rally Championship	Co-Drivers: (United Kingdom) Tony Ambrose	1965 European Rally Championship
European Rally Championship	Ladies: (United Kingdom) Pat Moss	1965 European Rally Championship
Finnish Rally Championship	(Finland) Rauno Aaltonen	1965 Finnish Rally Championship
Italian Rally Championship	(Italy) Enzo Martoni	
Italian Rally Championship	Co-Drivers: (Italy) Zefferino Filippi	
Italian Rally Championship	Manufacturers: (Italy) Lancia	
South African National Rally Championship	(South Africa) Ewold van Bergen	
South African National Rally Championship	Co-Drivers: (South Africa) Rex Wakley-Smith	
Spanish Rally Championship	(Spain) Jaime Juncosa Jr.	
Spanish Rally Championship	Co-Drivers: (Spain) Artemio Eche	

== Sports car and GT ==
Championship/Series	Manufacturer	Season article
International Championship for GT Manufacturers	Class GT+2.0: (United States) Shelby; Class GT2.0: (West Germany) Porsche; Class GT1.3: (Italy) Abarth-Simca	1965 World Sportscar Championship
International Prototype Trophy	(Italy) Ferrari	1965 World Sportscar Championship
United States Road Racing Championship	(United States) George Follmer	1965 United States Road Racing Championship

== Stock car racing ==
Series	Driver	Season article
NASCAR Grand National Series	(United States) Ned Jarrett	1965 NASCAR Grand National Series
NASCAR Grand National Series	Manufacturers: (United States) Ford	1965 NASCAR Grand National Series
NASCAR Pacific Coast Late Model Series	(United States) Bill Amick	1965 NASCAR Pacific Coast Late Model Series
ARCA Racing Series	(United States) Jack Bowsher	1965 ARCA Racing Series
Turismo Carretera	(Argentina) Dante Emiliozzi	1965 Turismo Carretera
USAC Stock Car National Championship	(United States) Norm Nelson	1965 USAC Stock Car National Championship

== Touring car ==
Championship/Series	Driver/Manufacturer	Season article
European Touring Car Challenge	Div.3 (Belgium) Jacky Ickx	1965 European Touring Car Challenge
European Touring Car Challenge	Div.3 Teams: (United States) Ford	1965 European Touring Car Challenge
European Touring Car Challenge	Div.2 (United Kingdom) John Whitmore	1965 European Touring Car Challenge
European Touring Car Challenge	Div.2 Teams: (United States) Ford	1965 European Touring Car Challenge
European Touring Car Challenge	Div.1 (Netherlands) Ed Swart	1965 European Touring Car Challenge
European Touring Car Challenge	Div.1 Teams: (Italy) Abarth	1965 European Touring Car Challenge
Australian Touring Car Championship	(Australia) Norm Beechey	1965 Australian Touring Car Championship
British Saloon Car Championship	(United Kingdom) Roy Pierpoint	1965 British Saloon Car Championship
British Saloon Car Championship	Teams: (United Kingdom) Weybridge Engineering Company	1965 British Saloon Car Championship

== See also ==
- List of motorsport championships
- Auto racing
