= Cooper T83 =

The Cooper T83 is an open-wheel formula racing car, designed, developed and built by British manufacturer Cooper, for Formula 3 categories, in 1966. It was an evolution of the previous T76. It was powered by a 998 cc (60.9 cu in) BMC four-cylinder engine, developing 88 hp (66 kW) @ 7,750 rpm, which had a 12.5:1 compression ratio. The chassis used was a tubular space frame, while the body was constructed as a semi-stressed skin. The front suspension was altered to widen the front track and minimise the leverage rate of the front shock absorbers. The rear suspension was also totally reworked, to equal the symmetry of the T81 Formula One car. The car was not successful. It suffered severe understeer, due to the undertray of the car being "flat-bottomed" in design (compared to the original "round-bottomed" design), almost creating aerodynamic vortices under the car, and affecting its ground effect properties. Only 7 models were produced. A developmental version of the car used a larger Cosworth SCB Formula Two engine. It entered more than 5 races, and claimed one pole position, but didn't finish that particular race; with the wheel coming off, and achieved no further success after that.

== See also ==
- Cooper T76 – predecessor to the T83
- Cooper T81 – contemporary Cooper Formula One car
- Formula 3 – category for which the T83 was developed
- Cooper Car Company – manufacturer of the T83
