= Cooper T72 =

1964 open-wheel Formula Three race car

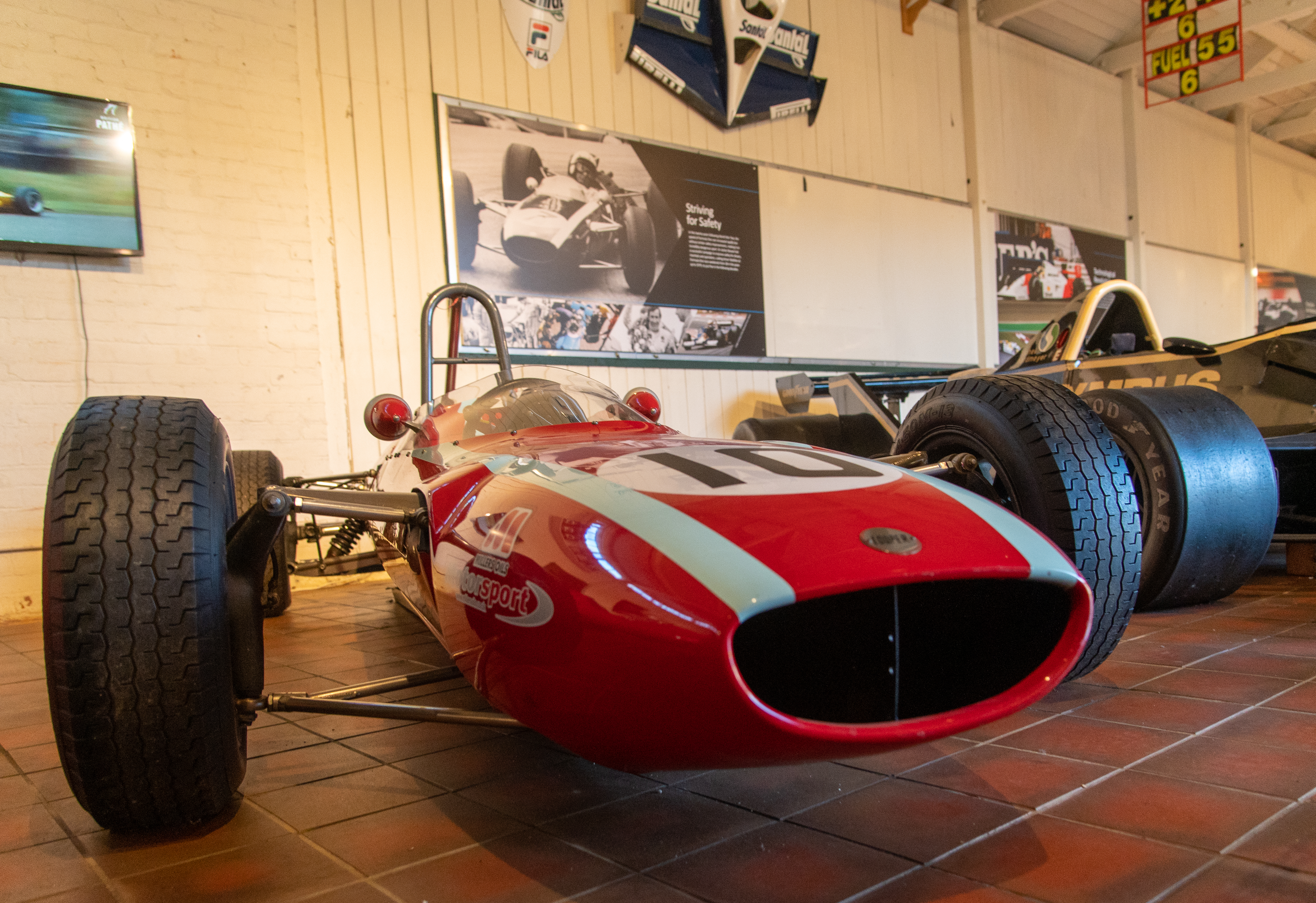
Cooper T72

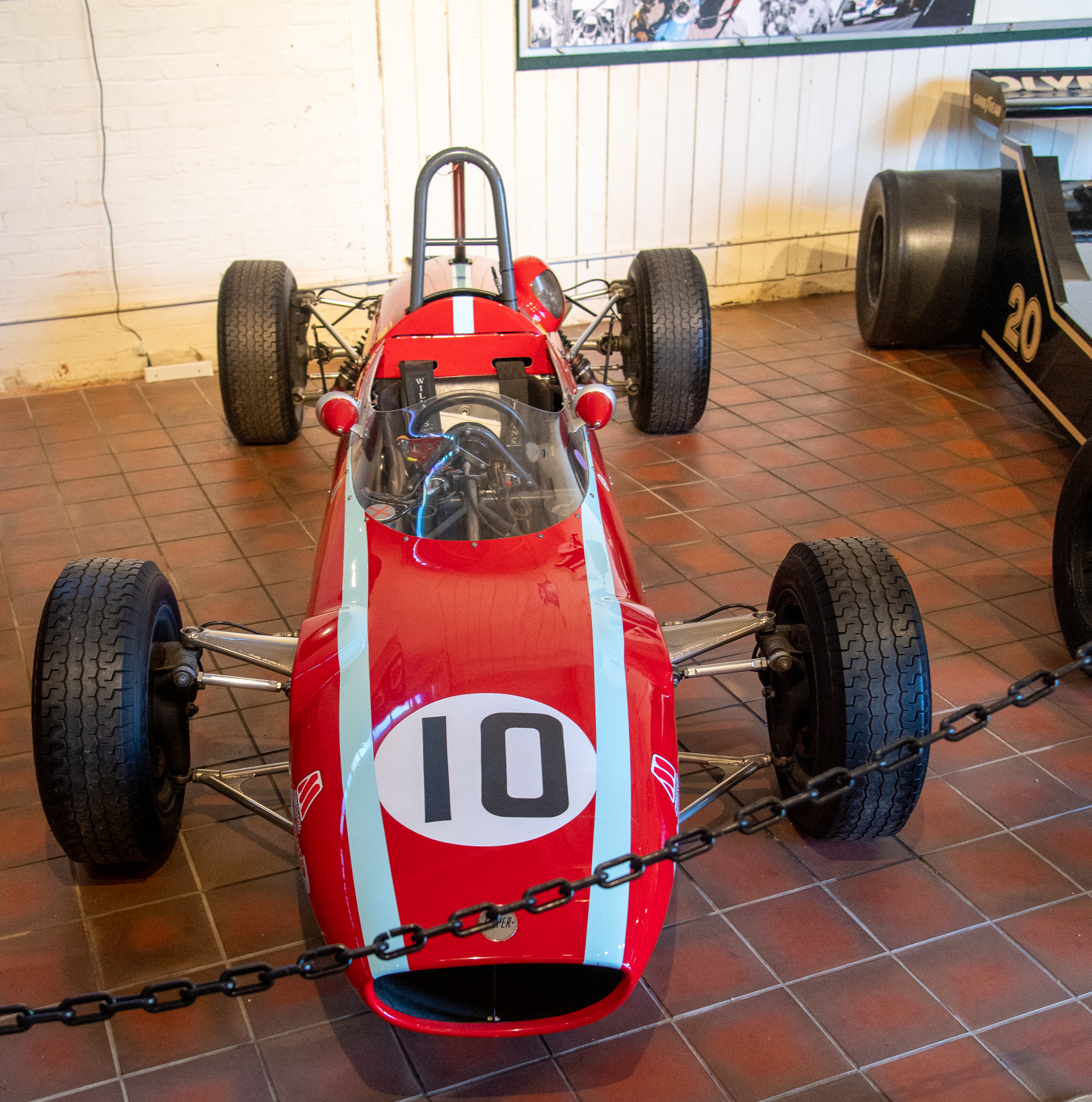
Top view

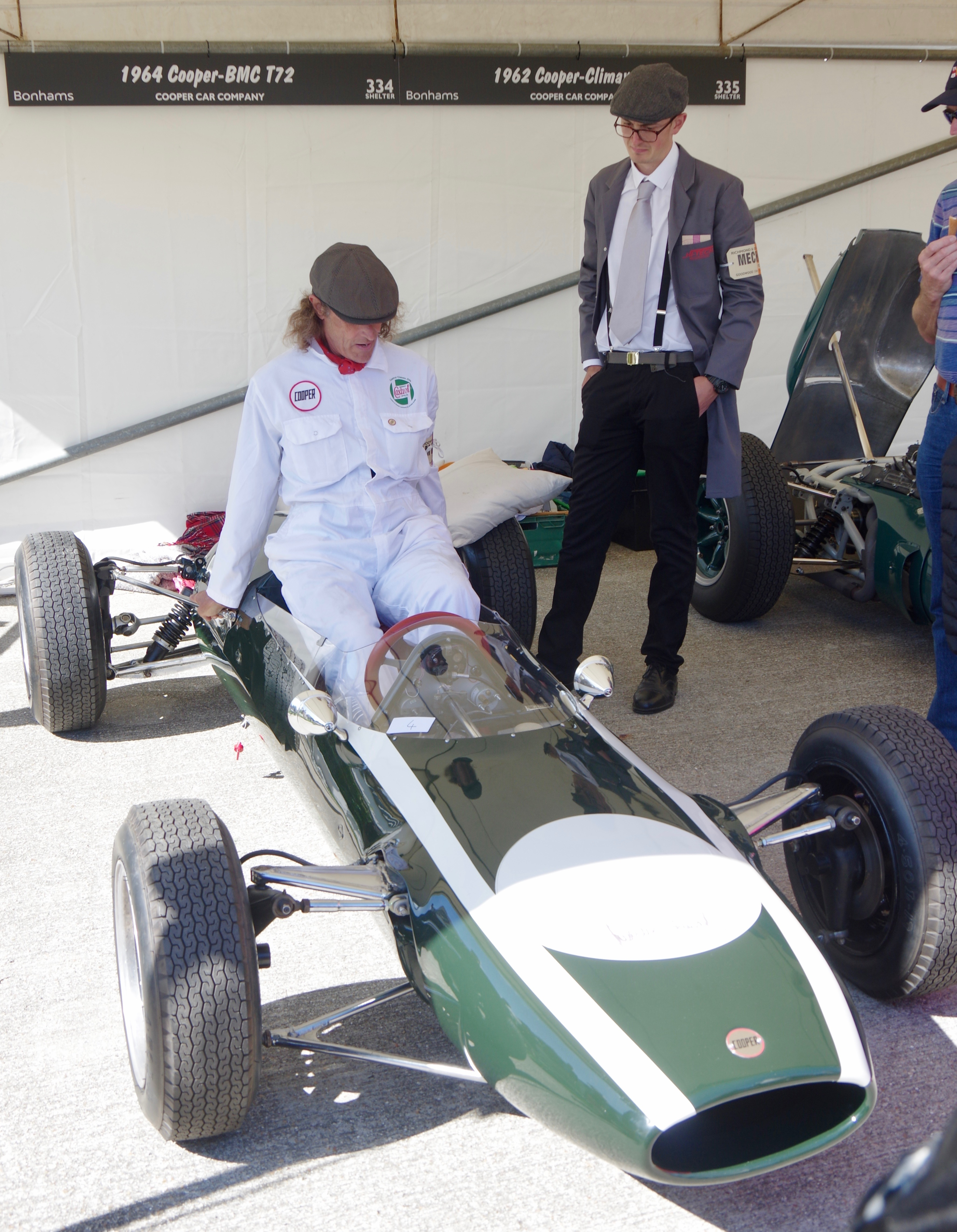
1964 Cooper T72 at the Goodwood Revival in 2019

The Cooper T72 is an open-wheel Formula Three race car, developed and built by British manufacturer Cooper in 1964. It was designed by engineers Eddie Stait and Neil Johanssen. It was powered by a 998 cc (60.9 cu in) BMC four-cylinder engine, developing 88 hp (66 kW) @ 7,750 rpm, which had a 12.5:1 compression ratio. The radiator and oil cooler were integrated into one unit, and the oil tank was positioned between the foot pedals and the radiator. It was constructed as a semi-stressed skin. It contested the 1964 British Formula Three season, where it completely dominated, winning 9 out of the 10 races that season, with both Jackie Stewart and John Taylor. Stewart eventually won the championship, winning 8 of those races. It also competed in a number of Formula Libre events. Only 18 cars were built.
