= Sverrir Thoroddsson =

Icelandic racing driver

- Nationality: Icelandic
- Born: 3 June 1944 (age 82) Reykjavík, Iceland

Championship titles
- 1964: SMRC British F3 Championship

Sverrir Thoroddsson (alternatively spelt Þóroddsson, born 3 June 1944 in Reykjavík) is a retired Icelandic racing driver.

== Biography ==
Iceland's first racing driver, Thoroddsson moved to England in 1964 to chase Formula One having only previously contested local amateur rallies in a Volkswagen Beetle. He purchased a Lotus 31 Formula 3 car and contested Formula Junior and the British Formula 3 Championship with Jim Russell Racing School, winning the SMRC championship.

Thoroddson moved to Italy in 1966, contesting Italian Formula 3 with local manufacturer De Sanctis for the next two years. His highlight was a third-place finish to Jonathan Williams at Monza having led most of the race, however he was personally affected by a crash at Caserta that claimed the lives of his team-mate Romano Perdoni and Italian F3 champion Giacomo Russo.

Thoroddsson returned to Iceland in 1970 where he entered into the aviation business, and later became a commentator for Formula One on Icelandic television.
