= List of 1963 motorsport champions =

1963 motorsport champions
Previous: 1962	Next: 1964

This list of 1963 motorsport champions is a list of national or international auto racing series with a Championship decided by the points or positions earned by a driver from multiple races.

== Motorcycle racing ==
Series	Rider	Season article
500cc World Championship	(United Kingdom) Mike Hailwood	1963 Grand Prix motorcycle racing season
350cc World Championship	(Federation of Rhodesia and Nyasaland) Jim Redman	1963 Grand Prix motorcycle racing season
250cc World Championship	(Federation of Rhodesia and Nyasaland) Jim Redman	1963 Grand Prix motorcycle racing season
125cc World Championship	(New Zealand) Hugh Anderson	1963 Grand Prix motorcycle racing season
50cc World Championship	(New Zealand) Hugh Anderson	1963 Grand Prix motorcycle racing season
Motocross World Championship	500cc: (Sweden) Rolf Tibblin	1963 FIM Motocross World Championship
Motocross World Championship	250cc: (Sweden) Torsten Hallman	1963 FIM Motocross World Championship
Speedway World Championship	(Sweden) Ove Fundin	1963 Individual Speedway World Championship

== Open wheel racing ==
Series	Driver	Season article
Formula One World Championship	(United Kingdom) Jim Clark	1963 Formula One season
Formula One World Championship	Constructors: (United Kingdom) Lotus-Climax	1963 Formula One season
Australian Drivers' Championship	(Australia) Bib Stillwell	1963 Australian Drivers' Championship
Australian Formula Junior Championship	(Australia) Leo Geoghegan	1963 Australian Formula Junior Championship
Campionato Italiano	(Italy) "Geki"	
Campionato Italiano	Teams: (Italy) Scuderia Madunina; Teams: (Italy) Scuderia Junior Italia	
Cup of Peace and Friendship	(East Germany) Heinz Melkus	1963 Cup of Peace and Friendship
Cup of Peace and Friendship	Nations: East Germany	1963 Cup of Peace and Friendship
South African Formula One Championship	(South Africa) Neville Lederle	1963 South African Formula One Championship
USAC National Championship	(United States) A. J. Foyt	1963 USAC Championship Car season
Formula Three
British Formula Three Championship	(United Kingdom) Peter Arundell	1963 British Formula Three Championship
East German Formula Junior Championship	(East Germany) Hans-Theo Tegeler	1963 East German Formula Junior Championship
East German Formula Junior Championship	LK II: (East Germany) Hans Roediger	1963 East German Formula Junior Championship
Soviet Formula 3 Championship	(Estonian Soviet Socialist Republic) Madis Laiv	1963 Soviet Formula 3 Championship

== Rallying ==
Series	Drivers	Season article
British Rally Championship	(United Kingdom) Tony Fisher	1963 British Rally Championship
British Rally Championship	Co-Drivers: (United Kingdom) Brian Melia	1963 British Rally Championship
Estonian Rally Championship	(Estonian Soviet Socialist Republic) Valdo Mägi	1963 Estonian Rally Championship
Estonian Rally Championship	Co-Drivers: (Estonian Soviet Socialist Republic) Kalju Nurme	1963 Estonian Rally Championship
European Rally Championship	(Sweden) Gunnar Andersson	1963 European Rally Championship
European Rally Championship	Co-Drivers: (Sweden) Lennart Berggren	1963 European Rally Championship
Finnish Rally Championship	(Finland) Simo Lampinen	1963 Finnish Rally Championship
Italian Rally Championship	(Italy) Arnaldo Cavallari	
Italian Rally Championship	Co-Drivers: (Italy) Dante Salvay	
Italian Rally Championship	Manufacturers: (Italy) Alfa Romeo	
South African National Rally Championship	(South Africa) Jan Hettema	
South African National Rally Championship	Co-Drivers: (South Africa) Reinhard Muhl	
Spanish Rally Championship	(Spain) Jaime Juncosa Sr.	
Spanish Rally Championship	Co-Drivers: (Spain) Jaime Juncosa Jr.	

== Sports car and GT ==
Series	Driver	Season article
International Championship for GT Manufacturers	Class GT+2.0: (Italy) Ferrari; Class GT2.0: (West Germany) Porsche; Class GT1.0: (Italy) Fiat-Abarth	1963 World Sportscar Championship
International Prototype Trophy	Class P+3.0: (Italy) Ferrari; Class P3.0: (Italy) Ferrari	1963 World Sportscar Championship
Australian GT Championship	(Australia) Bob Jane	1963 Australian GT Championship
SCCA National Sports Car Championship	C Modified: (United States) Harry Heuer	1963 SCCA National Sports Car Championship
SCCA National Sports Car Championship	D Modified: (United States) Roger Penske	1963 SCCA National Sports Car Championship
SCCA National Sports Car Championship	F Modified: (United States) Peter Sachs	1963 SCCA National Sports Car Championship

== Stock car racing ==
Series	Driver	Season article
NASCAR Grand National Series	(United States) Joe Weatherly	1963 NASCAR Grand National Series
NASCAR Grand National Series	Manufacturers: (United States) Ford	1963 NASCAR Grand National Series
NASCAR Pacific Coast Late Model Series	(United States) Ron Hornaday Sr.	1963 NASCAR Pacific Coast Late Model Series
ARCA Racing Series	(United States) Jack Bowsher	1963 ARCA Racing Series
Turismo Carretera	(Argentina) Dante Emiliozzi	1963 Turismo Carretera
USAC Stock Car National Championship	(United States) Don White	1963 USAC Stock Car National Championship

== Touring car ==
Series	Driver	Season article
European Touring Car Challenge	(Germany) Peter Nöcker	
Australian Touring Car Championship	(Australia) Bob Jane	1963 Australian Touring Car Championship
British Saloon Car Championship	(United Kingdom) Jack Sears	1963 British Saloon Car Championship

== See also ==
- List of motorsport championships
- Auto racing
