= Ed Swart =

Racecar driver

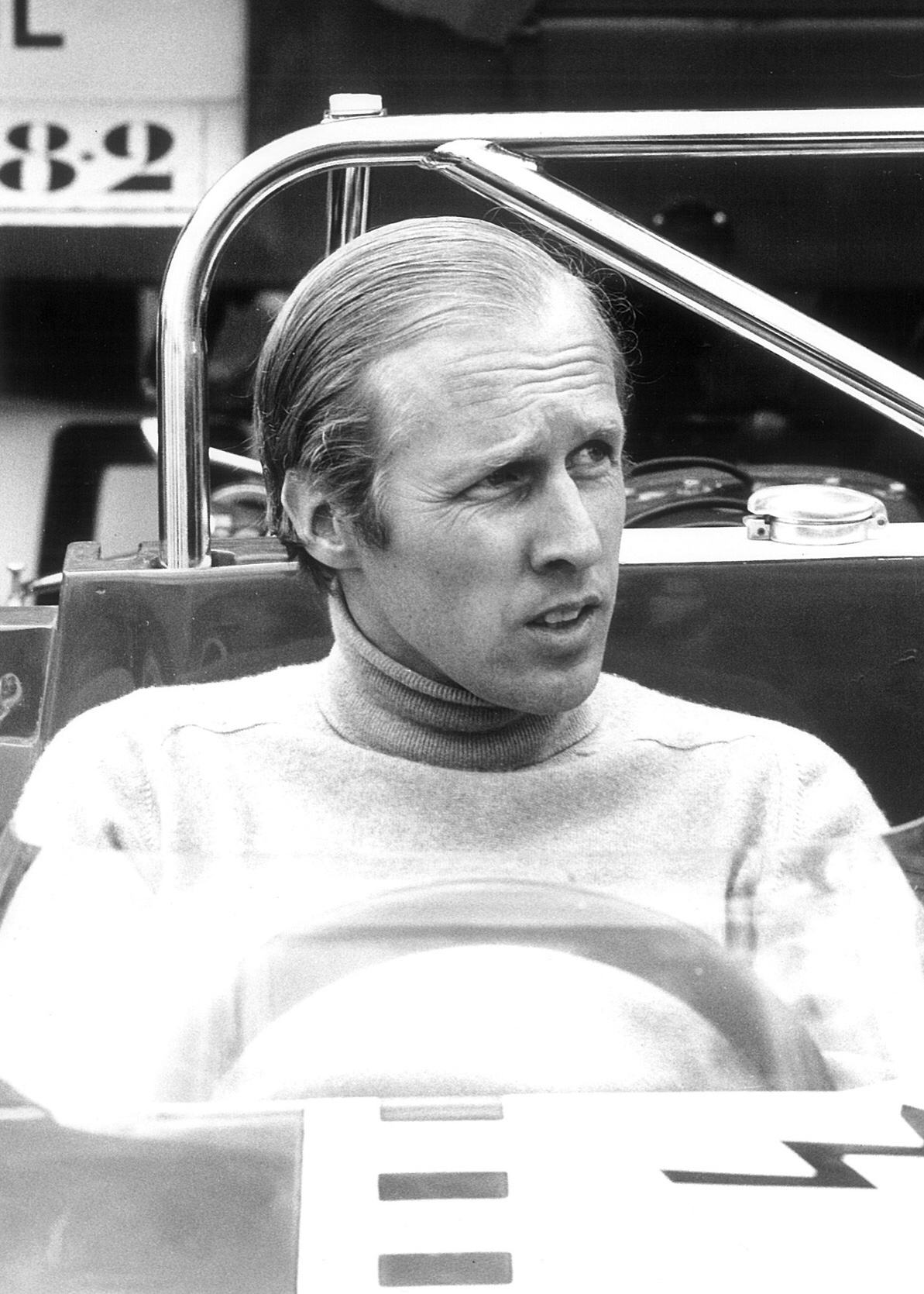
- Swart in 1971
- Nationality: (Netherlands) Dutch
- Born: Edouard Hendrik; 6 November 1937 (age 89) The Hague, Netherlands
- Debut season: 1961
- Former teams: Racing Team SAS, Team Radio Veronica, Abarth Corse, Canon Racing Team
- Wins: 74

Edouard Swart (né Hendrik; born 6 November 1937) was an active Dutch touring car and sports-prototype racing car driver from 1961 until 1972. He drove for the Abarth works team from 1965 till 1970 in the European FIA Touring Car Challenge and in the European FIA 2.0 L Sports-Prototype Challenge races. He was also a founder of three Dutch racing teams and Clerk of the Course for all the races at Zandvoort including the Formula One Grand Prix from 1974-1981. After his retirement in 1972, he returned to racing again in 1975 participating in historic races and some IMSA races in the USA after his immigration to California in 1980. He has raced in many different race car types (50) including touring cars, sports and prototype cars, Can-Am cars, Formula Atlantic, Formula 2, Formula 5000 and Formula One cars. From 1961 till 2016, he participated in 500+ pro and historic race weekends on 87 different race tracks in Europe, South Africa, United States, South America, Australia and Canada. In 2010, he was invited to join and is a current member of the RRDC (Road Racing Drivers Club), and in 2012 was inducted into the SVRA Hall of Fame. In 2018, honored by the Vintage Motorsports Council with the Dewey Dellinger Award. In 2021, Mr. Swart published a full race history in words and pictures with his book: Ed Swart – From Zandvoort to Daytona.

Swart married Sally Stokes, an avid equestrian and former partner of Formula One race driver Jim Clark.

== Wins ==
- Winner of the FIA European Touring Car Challenge (div.1) 1965
- Dutch National Champion 1000cc Touring Cars class, 1965 and 1966
- Winner of the FIA European Touring Car Challenge (850cc) 1968
- European 2-litre Sports Car Championship for Makes 1970 standings

== Teams ==
- Racing Team SAS - with 10 drivers 1963-1969 in Fiat Abarth cars
- Racing Team Radio Veronica - with 16 drivers 1970-1973 in Alfa Romeo –Fiat Abarth – Chevron cars
- Canon Racing Team - with eight drivers 1971-1972 in Chevron cars
