= Cooper T76 =

Formula 3 race car

The Cooper T76 is an open-wheel Formula 3 race car, designed, developed and built by British manufacturer Cooper in 1965. It was powered by either a 1.0 L (61 cu in) Cosworth MAE or BMC naturally-aspirated four-cylinder engine, which drove the rear wheels through a Hewland Mk5/6 manual transmission. It also featured reworked front and rear suspension, as well as variable anti-roll bars. Chassis design and construction was a tubular space frame. The car was essentially a modified variant of the previous T72. The rocker arm leverage ratio at the front of the car was altered from 2:1 to 1:3 to aid in the location and life of the shock absorber. The "anti-squat" system out of the rear suspension, and variable Armstrong shocks were installed. Rear-facing radius rods were linked to the front rocker arms to mitigate the forces felt under braking.
