= List of 1962 motorsport champions =

1962 motorsport champions
Previous: 1961	Next: 1963

This list of 1962 motorsport champions is a list of national or international auto racing series with a Championship decided by the points or positions earned by a driver from multiple races.

Some titles may be from single events.

== Motorcycle racing ==
Series	Rider	Season article
500cc World Championship	(United Kingdom) Mike Hailwood	1962 Grand Prix motorcycle racing season
350cc World Championship	(Federation of Rhodesia and Nyasaland) Jim Redman	1962 Grand Prix motorcycle racing season
250cc World Championship	(Federation of Rhodesia and Nyasaland) Jim Redman	1962 Grand Prix motorcycle racing season
125cc World Championship	(Switzerland) Luigi Taveri	1962 Grand Prix motorcycle racing season
50cc World Championship	(West Germany) Ernst Degner	1962 Grand Prix motorcycle racing season
Motocross World Championship	500cc: (Sweden) Rolf Tibblin	1962 Motocross World Championship
Motocross World Championship	250cc: (Sweden) Torsten Hallman	1962 Motocross World Championship
Speedway World Championship	(United Kingdom) Peter Craven	1962 Individual Speedway World Championship

== Open wheel racing ==
Series	Driver	Season article
Formula One World Championship	(United Kingdom) Graham Hill	1962 Formula One season
Formula One World Championship	Constructors: (United Kingdom) BRM	1962 Formula One season
Australian Drivers' Championship	(Australia) Bib Stillwell	1962 Australian Drivers' Championship
Australian Formula Junior Championship	(Australia) Frank Matich	1962 Australian Formula Junior Championship
Campionato Italiano	(Italy) "Geki"	
Campionato Italiano	Teams: (Italy) Scuderia Madunina	
East German Formula Junior Championship	(East Germany) Willy Lehmann	1962 East German Formula Junior Championship
South African Formula One Championship	(South Africa) Ernest Pieterse	1962 South African Formula One Championship
Soviet Formula 2 Championship	(Soviet Union) Yuri Vishniakov	1962 Soviet Formula 2 Championship
Soviet Formula 2 Championship	Teams: (Soviet Union) Spartak Leningrad	1962 Soviet Formula 2 Championship
USAC National Championship	(United States) Rodger Ward	1962 USAC Championship Car season
Formula Three
British Formula Three Championship	(United Kingdom) Peter Arundell	1962 British Formula Three Championship
Soviet Formula 3 Championship	(Soviet Union) Yuri Bugrov	1962 Soviet Formula 3 Championship

== Rallying ==
Series	Drivers	Season article
British Rally Championship	(United Kingdom) Tony Fisher	1962 British Rally Championship
British Rally Championship	Co-Drivers: (United Kingdom) Brian Melia	1962 British Rally Championship
Canadian Rally Championship	(Canada) George A. Merson	1962 Canadian Rally Championship
Canadian Rally Championship	Co-Drivers: (Canada) John C. Wilson	1962 Canadian Rally Championship
Estonian Rally Championship	(Estonian Soviet Socialist Republic) Valdo Mägi	1962 Estonian Rally Championship
Estonian Rally Championship	Co-Drivers: (Estonian Soviet Socialist Republic) Kalju Nurme	1962 Estonian Rally Championship
European Rally Championship	(Germany) Eugen Böhringer	1962 European Rally Championship
European Rally Championship	Co-Drivers: (Germany) Peter Long	1962 European Rally Championship
European Rally Championship	Ladies: (United Kingdom) Pat Moss	1962 European Rally Championship
Finnish Rally Championship	(Finland) Pauli Toivonen	1962 Finnish Rally Championship
Italian Rally Championship	(Italy) Arnaldo Cavallari	1962 Italian Rally Championship
Italian Rally Championship	Co-Drivers: (Italy) Dante Salvay	1962 Italian Rally Championship
Italian Rally Championship	Manufacturers: (Italy) Alfa Romeo	1962 Italian Rally Championship
South African National Rally Championship	(South Africa) Pieter Muhl	
South African National Rally Championship	Co-Drivers: (South Africa) Reinhard Muhl	
Spanish Rally Championship	(Spain) Mariano Lorente	
Spanish Rally Championship	Co-Drivers: (Spain) Jesús Sáez	

== Sports car and GT ==
Series	Champion	Season article
International Championship for GT Manufacturers	Class GT+2.0: (Italy) Ferrari; Class GT2.0: (West Germany) Porsche; Class GT1.0: (Italy) Fiat-Abarth	1962 World Sportscar Championship
Coupe des Sports	Class S3.0: (Italy) Ferrari; Class S2.0: (West Germany) Porsche; Class S1.0: (Italy) Fiat-Abarth	1962 World Sportscar Championship
Australian GT Championship	(Australia) John French	1962 Australian GT Championship
USAC Road Racing Championship	(United States) Roger Penske	1962 USAC Road Racing Championship
SCCA National Sports Car Championship	C Modified: (United States) Harry Heuer	1962 SCCA National Sports Car Championship
SCCA National Sports Car Championship	D Modified: (United States) Roger Penske	1962 SCCA National Sports Car Championship

== Stock car racing ==
Series	Driver	Season article
NASCAR Grand National Series	(United States) Joe Weatherly	1962 NASCAR Grand National Series
NASCAR Grand National Series	Manufacturers: (United States) Pontiac	1962 NASCAR Grand National Series
NASCAR Pacific Coast Late Model Series	(United States) Eddie Gray	1962 NASCAR Pacific Coast Late Model Series
ARCA Racing Series	(United States) Iggy Katona	1962 ARCA Racing Series
Turismo Carretera	(Argentina) Dante Emiliozzi	1962 Turismo Carretera
USAC Stock Car National Championship	(United States) Paul Goldsmith	1962 USAC Stock Car National Championship

== Touring car ==
Series	Driver	Season article
Australian Touring Car Championship	(Australia) Bob Jane	1962 Australian Touring Car Championship
British Saloon Car Championship	(Federation of Rhodesia and Nyasaland) John Love	1962 British Saloon Car Championship

== See also ==
- List of motorsport championships
- Auto racing
