= 1964 British Formula Three season =

Seasons
- ← 1963 1965 →

The 1964 British Formula Three season was the 14th season of the British Formula 3 season. Jackie Stewart took the BARC Championship, while Rodney Banting took the BRSCC Championship.

== BARC Championship ==
The British Racing Drivers Club (ARC) 1964 sanctioned British Formula 3 series was named "Express & Star British Formula 3 Championship". The scoring system was 9-6-4-3-2-1 points awarded to the first six classified finishers. All results counted towards the driver's final tally.

Champion: (United Kingdom) Jackie Stewart

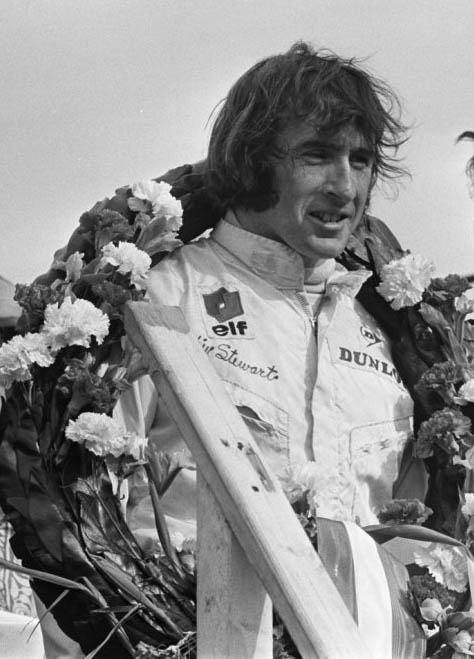
BARC British F3 champion, Jackie Stewart

=== Results ===
| Round | Circuit | Date | Winning driver | Winning car | Winning team |
|---|---|---|---|---|---|
| 1 | Mallory Park | 8 March | (United Kingdom) John Taylor | Cooper T72 | Tyrrell Racing |
| 2 | Snetterton | 14 March | (United Kingdom) Jackie Stewart | Cooper T72 | Tyrrell Racing |
| 3 | Goodwood | 30 March | (United Kingdom) Jackie Stewart | Cooper T72 | Tyrrell Racing |
| 4 | Oulton Park | 11 April | (United Kingdom) Jackie Stewart | Cooper T72 | Tyrrell Racing |
| 5 | Aintree | 18 April | (United Kingdom) Jackie Stewart | Cooper T72 | Tyrrell Racing |
| 6 | Silverstone | 2 May | (United Kingdom) Jackie Stewart | Cooper T72 | Tyrrell Racing |
| 7 | Mallory Park | 17 May | (United Kingdom) Jackie Stewart | Cooper T72 | Tyrrell Racing |
| 8 | Brands Hatch | 3 August | (United Kingdom) Warwick Banks | Cooper T72 | Tyrrell Racing |
| 9 | Oulton Park | 19 September | (United Kingdom) Jackie Stewart | Cooper T72 | Tyrrell Racing |
| 10 | Mallory Park | 11 October | (United Kingdom) Roger Mac | Brabham BT6 | Independent |

== BRSCC Championship ==
Champion: (United Kingdom) Rodney Banting

Runner Up: (United Kingdom) Chris Irwin

=== Results ===
| Round | Circuit | Date | Winning driver | Winning car | Winning team |
|---|---|---|---|---|---|
| 1 | Mallory Park | 30 March | (United Kingdom) Rodney Bloor | Brabham BT9 | Independent |
| 2 | Snetterton | 19 April | (United Kingdom) Rodney Banting | Lotus 31 | Independent |
| 3 | Castle Combe | 27 June | (United Kingdom) Rodney Banting | Lotus 31 | Independent |
| 4 | Snetterton | 5 July | (Iceland) Sverrir Thoroddsson | Lotus 31 | Jim Russell Racing Driver School |
| 5 | Snetterton | 3 August | (Iceland) Sverrir Thoroddsson | Lotus 31 | Jim Russell Racing Driver School |
| 6 | Croft | 22 August | (United Kingdom) Tony Dean | Lotus 22 | Independent |
| 7 | Brands Hatch | 30 August | (United Kingdom) Mike Budge | Cooper T59 | Independent |
| 8 | Crystal Palace | 5 September | (United Kingdom) Chris Irwin | Merlyn Mk7 | Merlyn Racing |
| 9 | Mallory Park | 13 September | (United Kingdom) Chris Irwin | Merlyn Mk7 | Merlyn Racing |
