= Jackie Stewart =

British racing driver (born 1939)

Sir Jackie Stewart OBE
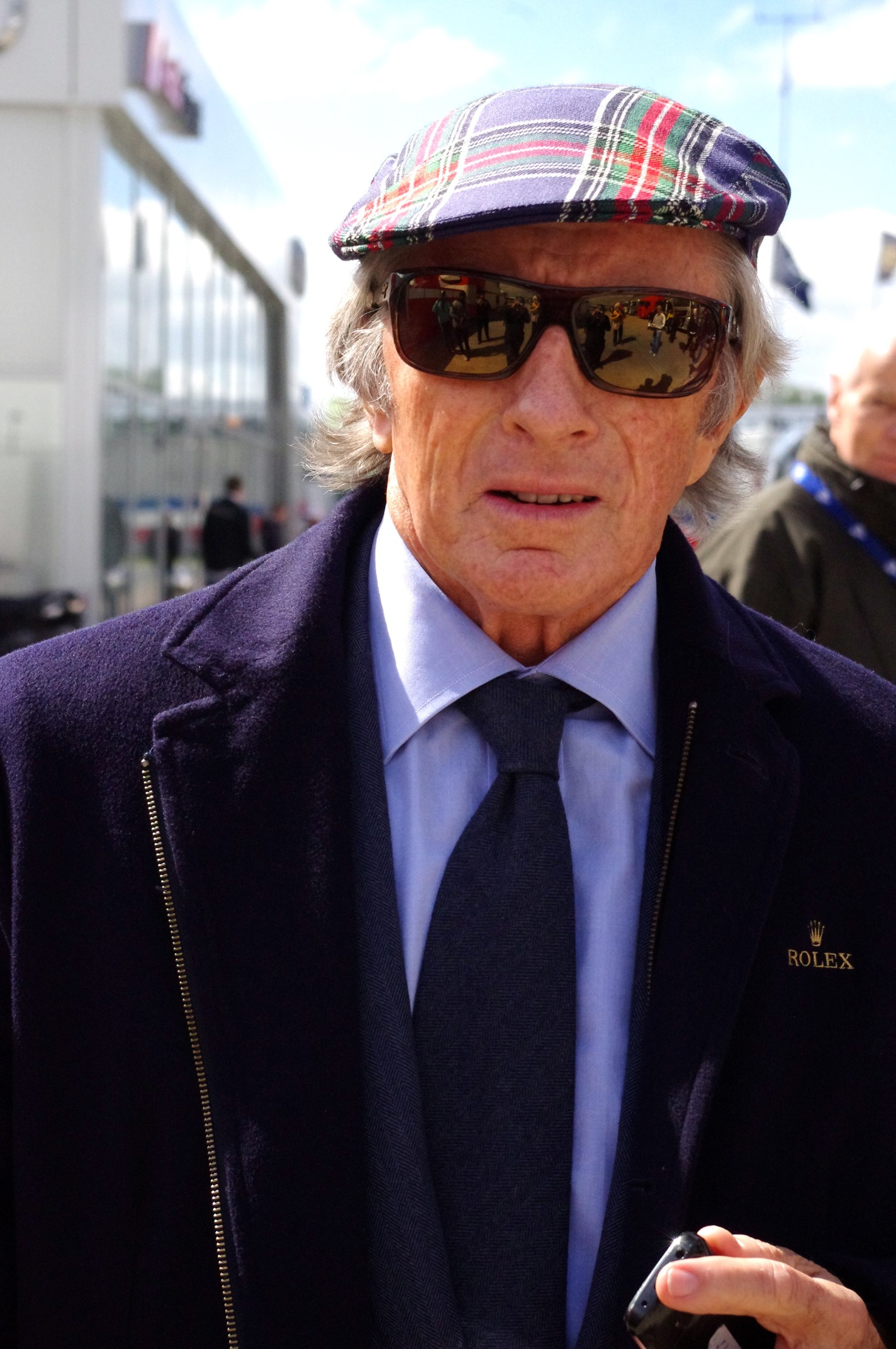
- Stewart at the 2014 6 Hours of Silverstone
- Born: John Young Stewart; 11 June 1939 (age 87); Milton, West Dunbartonshire, Scotland
- Spouse: Helen McGregor (m. 1962)
- Children: 2, including Paul
- Relatives: Jimmy Stewart (brother)

Formula One World Championship career
- Nationality: (United Kingdom) British
- Active years: 1965–1973
- Team(s): BRM, Tyrrell, Matra, March
- Entries: 100 (99 starts)
- Championships: 3 (1969, 1971, 1973)
- Wins: 27
- Podiums: 43
- Career points: 359 (360) (Note: Up until 1990, not all points scored by a driver contributed to their final World Championship tally (see list of points scoring systems for more information). Numbers without parentheses are Championship points; numbers in parentheses are total points scored.)
- Pole positions: 17
- Fastest laps: 15
- First entry: 1965 South African Grand Prix
- First win: 1965 Italian Grand Prix
- Last win: 1973 German Grand Prix
- Last entry: 1973 United States Grand Prix

Sir John Young Stewart (born 11 June 1939) is a British former racing driver, broadcaster and motorsport executive from Scotland who competed in Formula One from 1965 to 1973. Nicknamed "the Flying Scot", Stewart won three Formula One World Drivers' Championship titles with Tyrrell, (Note: Stewart won his maiden World Drivers' Championship with Matra International—a privateer team using a Matra chassis—in 1969, who later became Tyrrell Racing Organisation. As of 2024, this title remains the only championship won with a privateer team.) and—at the time of his retirement—held the records for most wins (27) and podium finishes (43).

In addition to his three titles, Stewart finished as runner-up twice during his nine seasons in Formula One. He was the only British driver with three championships until Lewis Hamilton equalled him in 2015. Outside Formula One, he narrowly missed out on a win at his first attempt at the Indianapolis 500 in 1966 and competed in the Can-Am series in 1970 and 1971. Between 1997 and 1999, in partnership with his son, Paul, he was team principal of the Stewart Grand Prix F1 racing team. After retiring from racing, Stewart was an ABC network television sports commentator for both auto racing, covering the Indianapolis 500 for over a decade, and for several summer Olympics covering many events, being a distinctive presence with his pronounced Scottish accent. Stewart also served as a television commercial spokesman for both the Ford Motor Company and Heineken beer.

Stewart was instrumental in improving the safety of motor racing, campaigning for better medical facilities and track improvements at motor racing circuits. After John Surtees's death in 2017, he is the last surviving Formula One World Champion from the 1960s. He is also the oldest living Grand Prix winner.

== Early life ==
Stewart was born in Milton, Dunbartonshire, Scotland, a village fifteen miles west of Glasgow. Stewart's family were Austin, and later Jaguar, car dealers and had built up a successful business. His father had been an amateur motorcycle racer, and his brother Jimmy was a racing driver with a local reputation who drove for Ecurie Ecosse and competed in the 1953 British Grand Prix at Silverstone.

Stewart attended Hartfield primary school in the nearby town of Dumbarton, and moved to Dumbarton Academy at the age of 12. He experienced learning difficulties owing to undiagnosed dyslexia, and due to the condition not being understood or even widely known at the time, he was regularly berated and humiliated by teachers and peers alike for being "dumb" and "thick". Stewart was unable to continue his secondary education past the age of 16, and began working in his father's garage as an apprentice mechanic. He was not actually diagnosed with dyslexia until 1980, when his oldest son Mark was diagnosed with the condition. On learning that dyslexia can be genetically passed on, and seeing very similar symptoms with his son that he had experienced himself as a child, Stewart asked if he could be tested, and was diagnosed with the disorder, by which time he was 41 years old. He has said that "when you've got dyslexia and you find something you're good at, you put more into it than anyone else; you can't think the way of the clever folk, so you're always thinking out of the box."

At the age of 13, Stewart won a clay pigeon shooting competition and then went on to become a prize-winning member of the Scottish shooting team, competing in the United Kingdom and abroad. He won the British, Irish, Welsh and Scottish skeet shooting championships and twice won the "Coupe de Nations" European championship. He competed for a place on the British trap shooting team for the 1960 Summer Olympics, but finished third behind Joe Wheater and Brett Huthart.

Stewart's first car was a light green Austin A30 with "real leather [covered] seats" which he purchased shortly before his seventeenth birthday for £375, a detail he was able to recall for an interviewer sixty years later. He had saved up the purchase price from tips received from his job at the family garage. He took up an offer from Barry Filer, a customer of the family business, to test in a number of his cars at Oulton Park. For 1961, Filer provided a Marcos, in which Stewart scored four wins, and competed once in Filer's Aston DB4GT. In 1962, to help decide if he was ready to become a professional driver, he tested a Jaguar E-type at Oulton Park, matching Roy Salvadori's times in a similar car the year before. He won two races, his first in England, in the E-type, and David Murray of Ecurie Ecosse offered him a ride in the Tojeiro EE Mk2, and their Cooper T49, in which he won at Goodwood. For 1963, he earned fourteen wins, a second, and two thirds, with six retirements.

In 1964, Stewart again signed with Ecurie Ecosse. Ken Tyrrell, then running the Formula Junior team for the Cooper Car Company, heard of the young Scotsman from Goodwood's track manager and called up Jimmy Stewart to see if his younger brother was interested in a tryout. Stewart came down for the test at Goodwood, taking over a new, and very competitive, Formula Three T72-BMC which Bruce McLaren was testing. Soon, Stewart was bettering McLaren's times, causing McLaren to return to the track for some quicker laps. Again, Stewart was quicker, and Tyrrell offered Stewart a spot on the team.

== Racing career ==
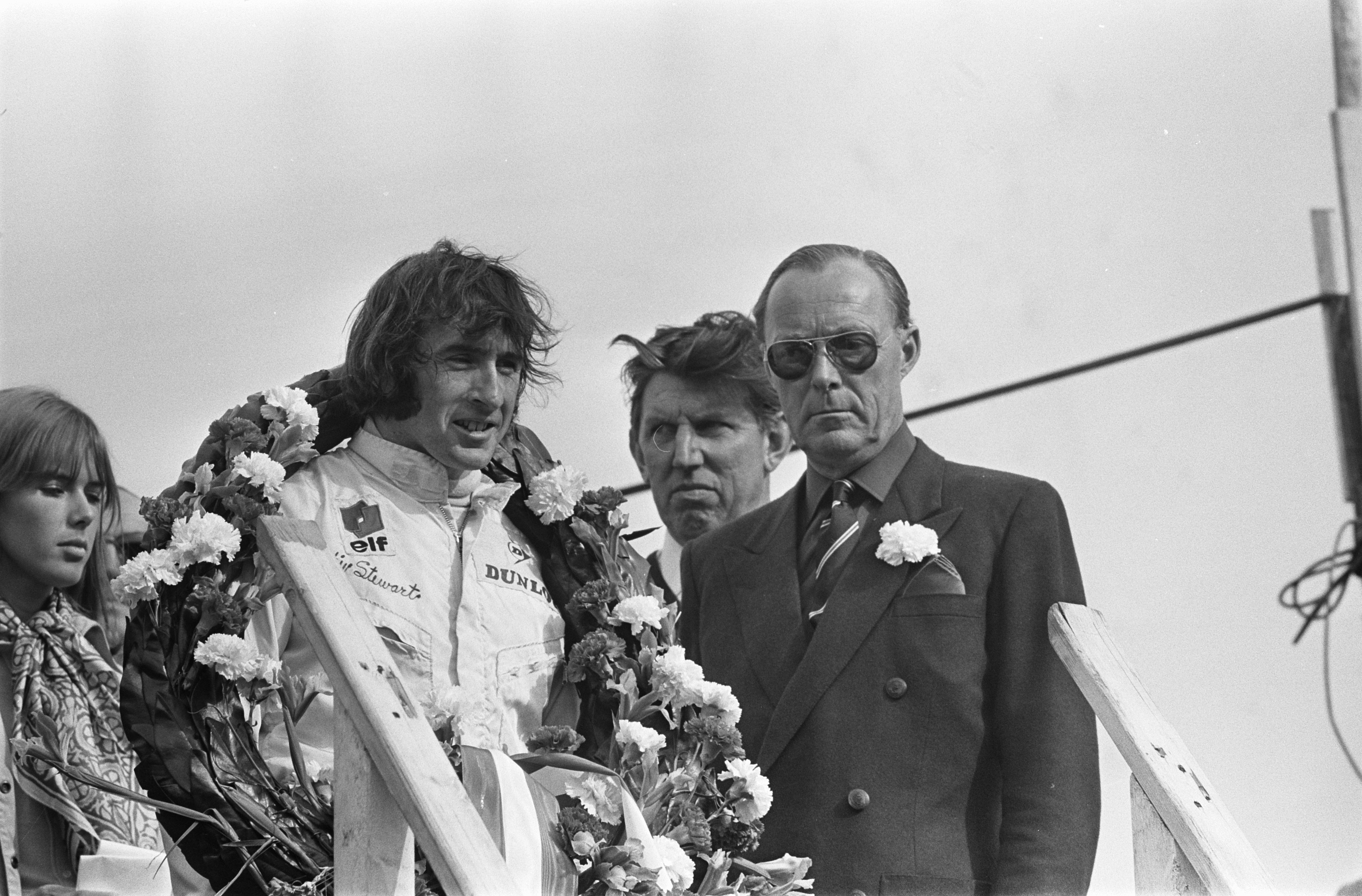
Stewart at the 1969 Dutch Grand Prix

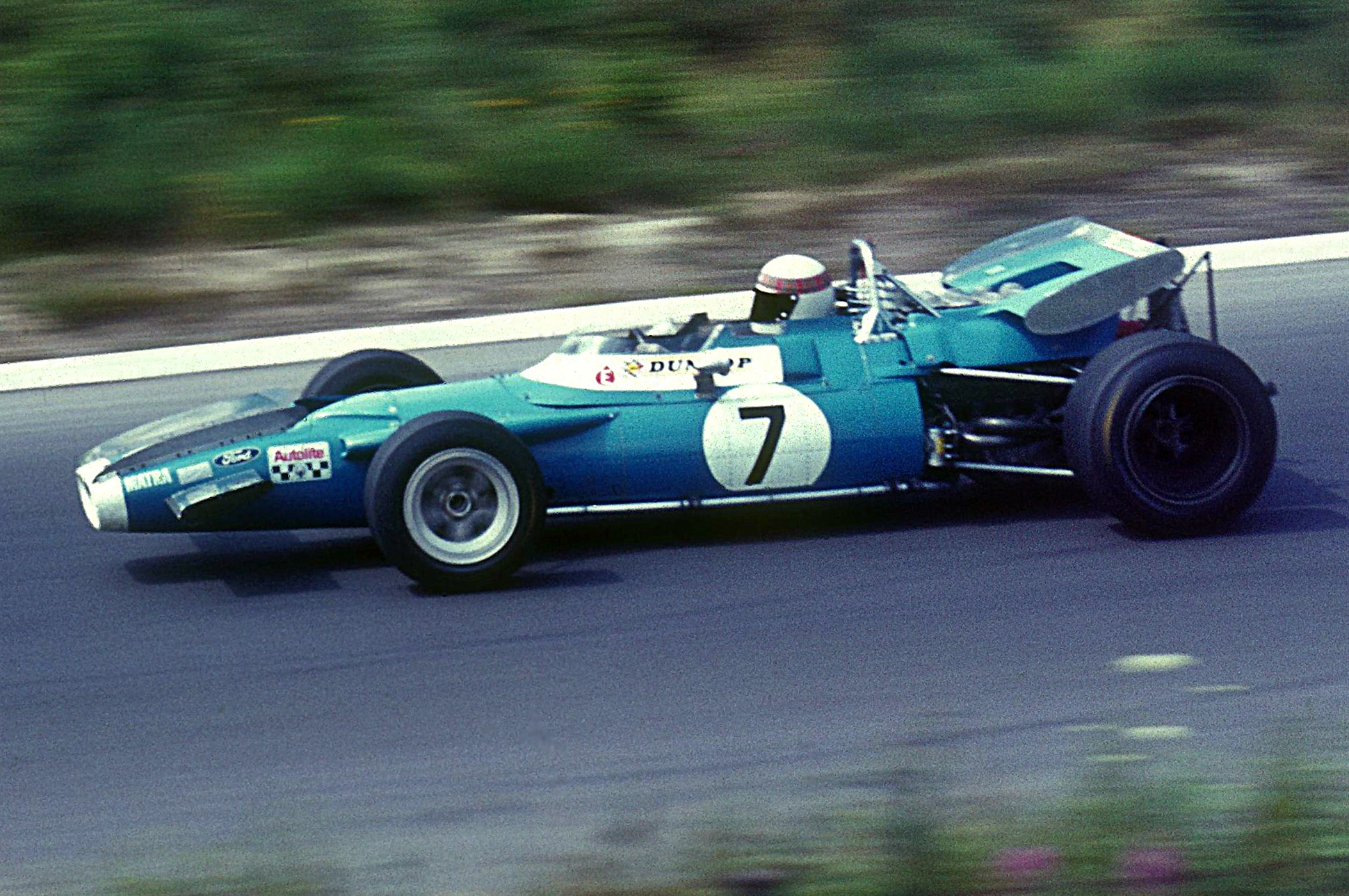
Stewart in 1969 with the Matra MS80 at the Nürburgring

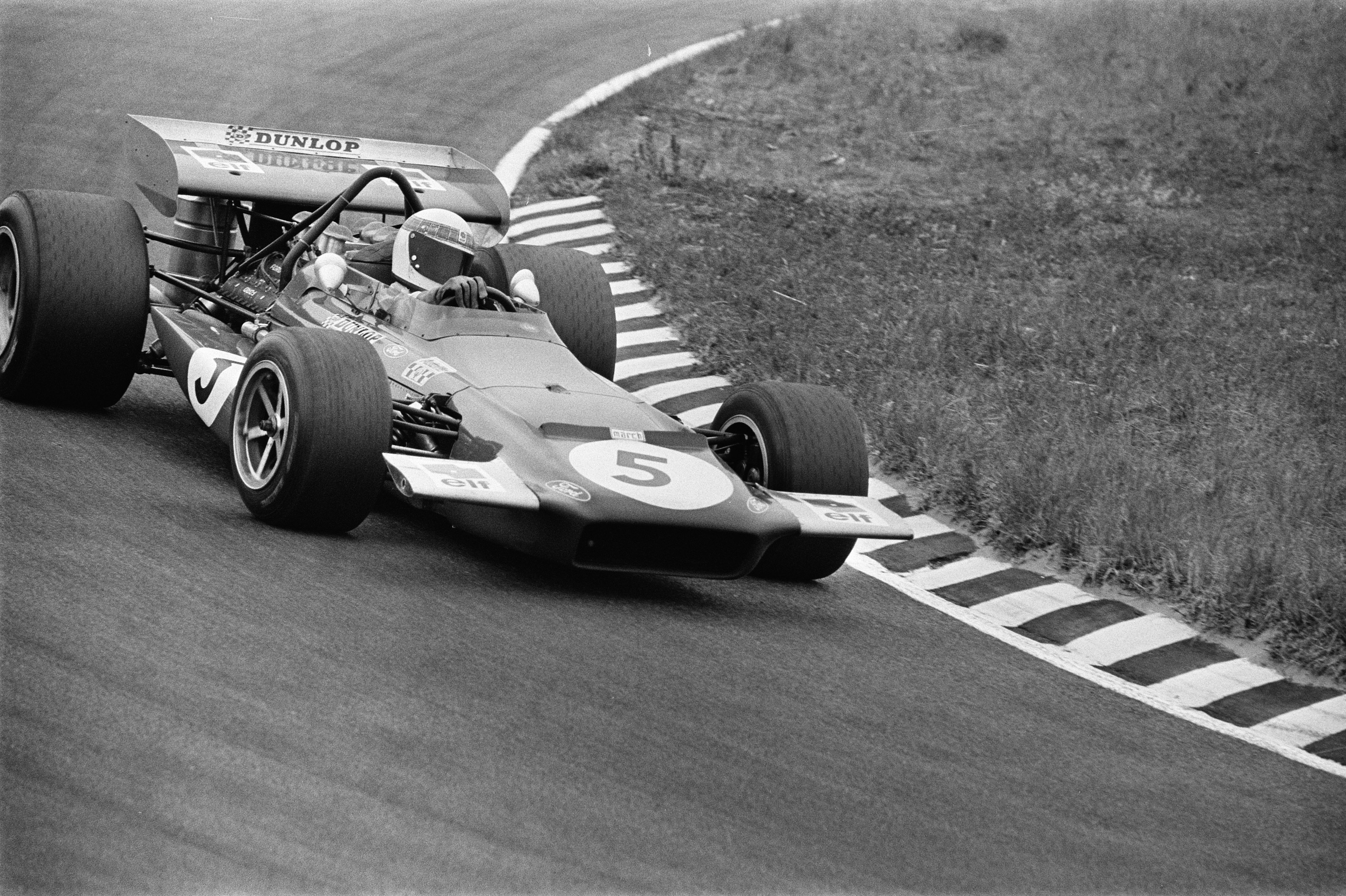
Stewart in the Tyrrell entered March 701 at the 1970 Dutch Grand Prix

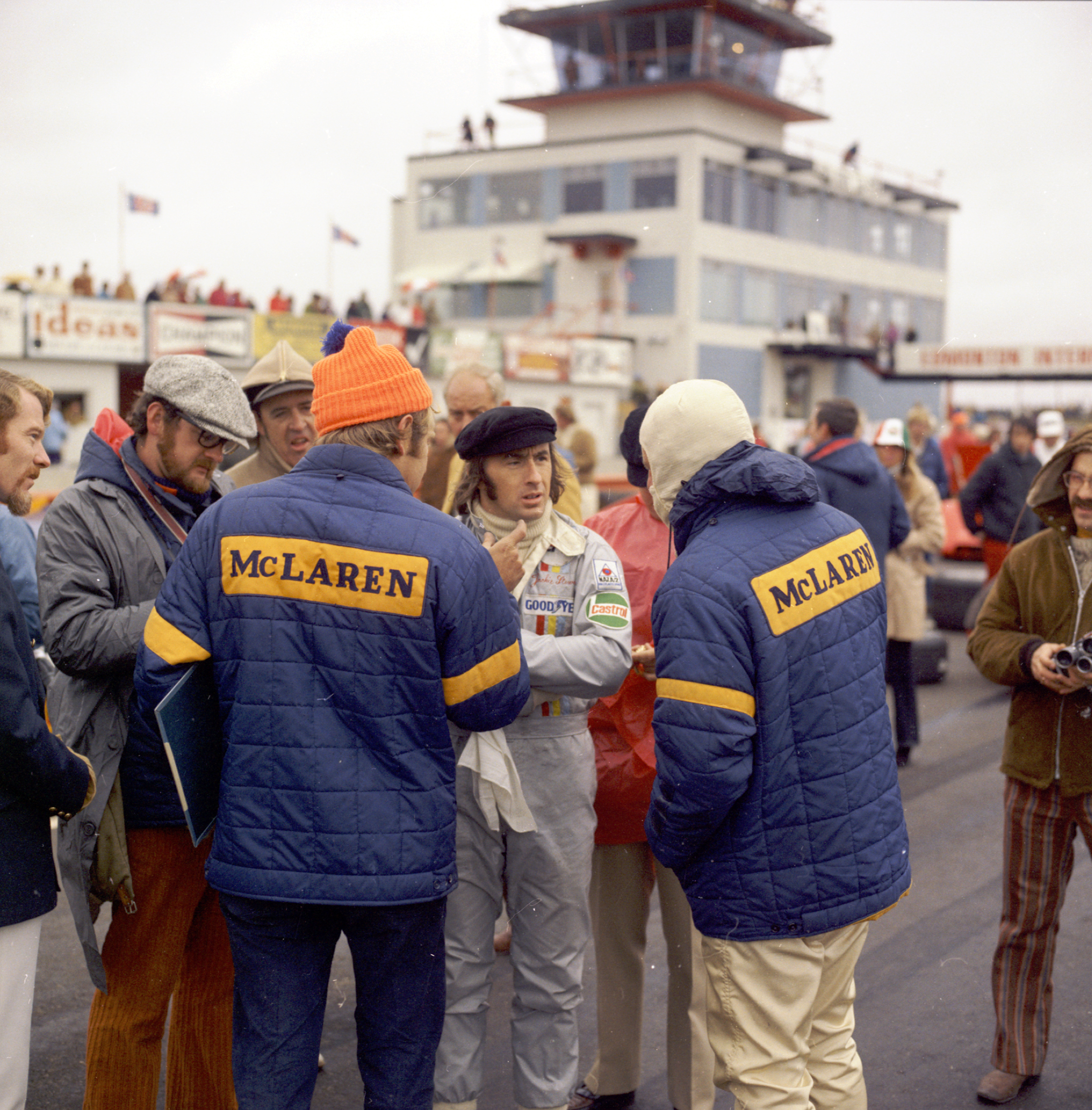
Stewart at the Can-Am Races, 1971

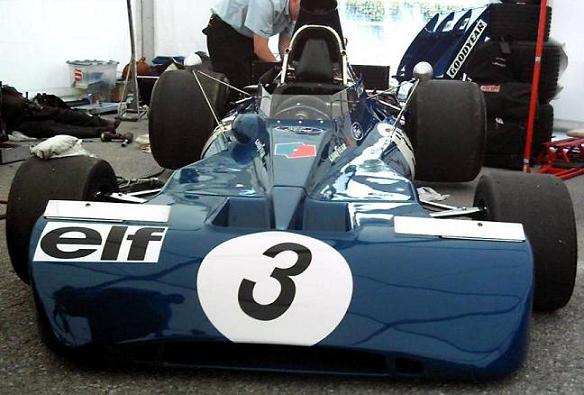
Tyrrell 003, the car that took Stewart to the 1971 World Championship

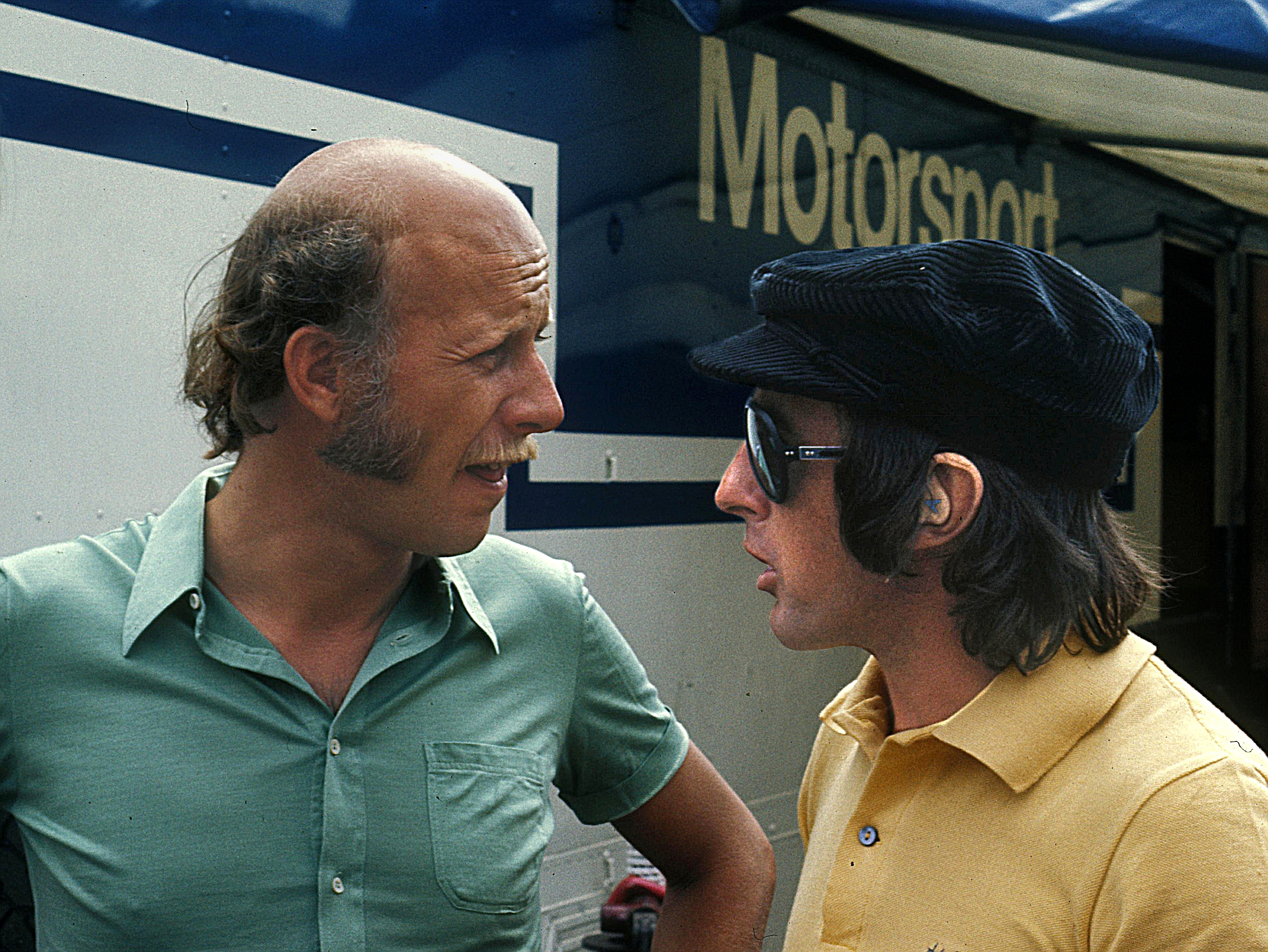
Stewart (right) in conversation with Mike Kranefuss in 1973

=== Junior career ===
In 1964, Stewart drove in Formula Three (F3) for Tyrrell. His debut, in the wet at Snetterton on 15 March, was dominant; he took a 25-second lead in just two laps before coasting home to a win by 44 seconds. Within days, he was offered a F1 ride with Cooper but declined, preferring to gain experience under Tyrrell; he won all but two races (one due to clutch failure, the other to a spin) in becoming F3 champion. After running John Coombs' E-type and practising in a Ferrari at Le Mans, Stewart took a trial in an F1 Lotus 33-Climax, in which he impressed Colin Chapman and Jim Clark. Stewart again refused a ride in F1 but went instead to the Lotus Formula Two (F2) team. In his F2 debut, he was second at the difficult Circuit Clermont-Ferrand in a Lotus 32-Cosworth.

=== BRM (1965–1967) ===
While Stewart signed with BRM alongside Graham Hill in 1965, a contract which netted him £4,000, his first race in an F1 car was for Lotus, as stand-in for an injured Jim Clark, at the non-championship Rand Grand Prix in December 1964; after qualifying in pole position the Lotus broke in the first heat, but he won the second and claimed fastest lap. On his World Championship F1 debut in South Africa, Stewart finished sixth. His first major competition victory came in the BRDC International Trophy in the late spring, and before the end of the year he won his first World Championship race, at Monza after fighting wheel-to-wheel with teammate Hill's P261. Stewart finished his rookie season with a win, three seconds, a third, a fifth, and a sixth, and third place in the World Drivers' Championship. He also piloted Tyrrell's unsuccessful F2 Cooper T75-BRM, and drove the Rover Company's revolutionary turbine car at the 24 Hours of Le Mans alongside Graham Hill.

At the start of the 1966 season, Stewart won the Tasman Series from his BRM teammate Graham Hill in two-litre BRMs and also raced closely with his great rival and friend Jim Clark who was somewhat disadvantaged by an unreliable Lotus 39 which was let down by its old 2.5-litre Climax engine. In F1, after his promising start the previous year, 1966 was a poor year for Stewart; the 3-litre H16 BRMs were unreliable, although Stewart did win the Monaco Grand Prix in a 2-litre engined car. The most significant event in that year was his accident at the Belgian Grand Prix at Spa-Francorchamps, which sparked his campaign to improve safety in F1 and caused him to miss the French Grand Prix at Reims.

Stewart had some success in other forms of racing during the year, winning the 1966 Rothmans 12 Hour International Sports Car Race and almost winning the Indianapolis 500 on his first attempt, in John Mecom's Lola T90-Ford, only to be denied by a broken scavenge pump while leading by over a lap with eight laps to go. However, Stewart's performance, having had the race fully in hand, sidelined only by mechanical failure, won him Rookie of the Year honours despite the winner, Graham Hill, also being an Indianapolis rookie. Stewart appeared at the 24 Hours of Le Mans test day on 3 April 1966 driving a Ford GT40 Mk II version of Holman & Moody and the Ford GT40 owned by Alan Mann Racing.

BRM's fortunes did not improve in 1967 despite Stewart closely contesting the Tasman Series with Jim Clark, who probably raced closer and harder with him than at any time in their careers. While Clark usually won, Stewart won a victory in the New Zealand Grand Prix with Clark attempting to run him down in the last laps with bodywork flying off his Lotus. In F1, the BRMs were still struggling with reliability problems and Stewart came no higher than second, at Spa, while having to drive one-handed while holding the car in gear with the other. In F2 he won events at Karlskoga, Enna, Oulton Park, and Albi in a Tyrrell-entered Matra MS5 or MS7. He also placed second driving a works-entered Ferrari driving with Chris Amon at the BOAC 6 Hours at Brands Hatch, the tenth round of World Sportscar Championship at the time. Stewart also attempted to run the 1967 National 500 NASCAR race but did not qualify for the race.

=== Matra/Tyrrell (1968–1973) ===
For 1968, Stewart switched to Tyrrell's Matra International team, where he drove a Matra MS10-Cosworth. He took a prominent role in the management of the team, negotiating with team sponsor François Guiter for additional funding and leading presentations to engine and tyre suppliers Ford and Goodyear. Mark Hughes described him as "a different sort of F1 driver to any that had been seen before."

After a promising start in South Africa with the Matra MS9 development mule he missed Jarama and Monaco due to an F2 injury at Jarama and his first win of the season was in heavy rain at Zandvoort. Another win in rain and fog at the Nürburgring followed, where he won by a margin of four minutes. He also won at Watkins Glen but his car failed at Mexico City, and so he lost the drivers' title to Hill.

In 1969, driving the Matra MS80-Cosworth, Stewart had a number of races where he completely dominated the opposition, such as winning by over two laps at Montjuïc, a minute in front at Clemont-Ferrand and by more than a lap at Silverstone. With additional wins at Kyalami, Zandvoort, and Monza, Stewart became world champion. Until 2005 he was the only driver to have won the championship in a car built by a French constructor and remains the only driver to win the world championship in a car built in France as well as in a car entered by a privateer team. Also that year, Stewart led at least one lap of every World Championship Grand Prix, and remains the only driver to achieve this feat.

For 1970, Matra insisted on using their own V12 engines, while Tyrrell and Stewart wanted to continue with the Cosworth and maintain their connection to Ford, which conflicted with Matra's recent connections to Chrysler. Tyrrell decided to build his own car and in the interim bought a chassis from March Engineering; Stewart took the March 701-Cosworth to wins at the Daily Mail Race of Champions and Jarama, but development on the car stalled and it was soon overcome by the Lotus team's new 72. The new Tyrrell 001-Cosworth, appeared in August and suffered problems but showed promise. Tyrrell continued to be sponsored by French fuel company Elf, and Stewart raced in a car painted French Racing Blue for many years. Stewart also continued to race sporadically in F2, winning at Crystal Palace and placing at Thruxton. A projected Le Mans appearance, to co-drive the 4.5 litre Porsche 917K with Steve McQueen, did not come off, due to McQueen's inability to get insurance. He also had a one-off race in Can-Am, in the revolutionary Chaparral 2J. Stewart qualified third, in what was the car's first outing, but brake failure ended his race.

Stewart went on to win the F1 World Championship in 1971 using the Tyrrell 003-Cosworth, winning Spain, Monaco, France, Britain, Germany, and Canada. He also did a full season in Can-Am, driving a Carl Haas sponsored Lola T260-Chevrolet. During the 1971 season, Stewart was the only driver able to challenge the McLarens driven by Denny Hulme and Peter Revson. Stewart won two races, at Mont Tremblant and Mid Ohio, and finished 3rd in the championship. The stress of racing year round and on several continents eventually caused medical problems for Stewart. He won the 1971 world championship despite having mononucleosis and crossing the Atlantic Ocean 186 times due to media commitments in the United States. During the 1972 season, he missed the Belgian Grand Prix at Nivelles due to gastritis, and had to cancel plans to drive a Can-Am McLaren; he won the Argentine, French, U.S., and Canadian Grands Prix to come second to Emerson Fittipaldi in the drivers' standings. Stewart also competed in a Ford Capri RS2600 in the European Touring Car Championship, with F1 teammate François Cevert and other F1 pilots, at a time when the competition between Ford and BMW was at a height. Their best result was at the 6 Hours of Paul Ricard, finishing second. In 1972 Stewart also received the OBE.

Entering the 1973 season, Stewart had decided to retire. In 2023, Stewart revealed on the Beyond the Grid podcast: "It was at Indianapolis and I was getting depressed by the pace of my life, the limit of being at home, I had two little boys and of course Helen. I had been doing enormous travel, in the days we speak of and my day as a racing driver, we don't make the money that is made today and to make proper money you had to do a lot of races. It wasn't just the question of Formula 1, nobody did Formula 1 so I was doing Can-Am, was doing Indianapolis, Touring Cars, GT Cars, everything you can think of on a global basis and most of my friends was dying as it went along. In fact Helen my wife counted 57 friends that had died that holidayed with, travelled with and of course raced with. I think it all got on top of me and I had mononucleosis one year (1971) and had gastritis that burst and thought why am I doing this to this extent. I had made good money." He nevertheless won at South Africa, Belgium, Monaco, and the Netherlands. His last and then record-setting 27th victory came at the Nürburgring with a 1–2 for Tyrrell. He recalled: "Nothing gave me more satisfaction than to win at the Nürburgring and yet I was always afraid. When I left home for the German Grand Prix I always used to pause at the end of the driveway and take a long look back. I was never sure I'd come home again." After the fatal crash of his teammate François Cevert in practice for the 1973 United States Grand Prix at Watkins Glen, Stewart retired one race earlier than intended and missed what would have been his 100th Grand Prix. Stewart had already won the Drivers' Championship at the Italian Grand Prix two races previously; this was a race where Stewart had to come into the pits to change a flat tyre, and drove from 20th to finish 4th.

Stewart held the record for most wins by a F1 driver (27) for 14 years until Alain Prost won the 1987 Portuguese Grand Prix, and the record for most wins by a British F1 driver for 19 years until Nigel Mansell won the 1992 British Grand Prix. In his commentary work for race broadcaster Channel 9 during qualifying for the 1988 Australian Grand Prix, Stewart said that he had been asked numerous times if he was unhappy about losing his record to Prost, going on to say that he was happy that his record had been taken by someone of the calibre of Prost, as he believed him to be the best driver in F1. Until 2015, Stewart was the only British driver to win three championships; this record was broken by future seven-time World Champion Lewis Hamilton. When John Surtees died in March 2017, Stewart became the last surviving F1 World Champion from the 1960s. He also became the oldest living F1 winner upon the death in 2022 of six-time race winner Tony Brooks, who raced during the 1950s.

== Racing safety advocate ==
At Spa-Francorchamps in 1966, Stewart ran off the track while driving at 165 mph (266 km/h) in heavy rain, and crashed into a telephone pole and a shed before coming to rest in a farmer's outbuilding. His steering column pinned his leg, while ruptured fuel tanks emptied their contents into the cockpit. There were no track crews to extricate him, nor were proper tools available. Stewart was rescued by fellow drivers Graham Hill and Bob Bondurant, who had also crashed nearby. There were no doctors or medical facilities at the track, and Stewart was put in the bed of a pickup truck, remaining there until an ambulance arrived. He was first taken to the track's first aid centre, where he waited on a stretcher, which was placed on a floor strewn with cigarette ends and other rubbish. Finally, another ambulance crew picked him up, but the ambulance driver got lost driving to a hospital in Liège. Ultimately, a private jet flew Stewart back to the UK for treatment. After his crash at Spa, Stewart became an outspoken advocate for auto racing safety. Later, he explained: "If I have any legacy to leave the sport I hope it will be seen to be an area of safety because when I arrived in Grand Prix racing so-called precautions and safety measures were diabolical."

Stewart campaigned with Louis Stanley (BRM team director) for improved emergency services and better safety barriers around race tracks. He said: "We were racing at circuits where there were no crash barriers in front of the pits, and fuel was lying about in churns in the pit lane. A car could easily crash into the pits at any time. It was ridiculous." As a stop-gap measure, Stewart hired a private doctor to be at all his races, and taped a spanner to the steering shaft of his BRM in case it would be needed again. Stewart pressed for mandatory seat belt usage and full-face helmets for drivers, which have become unthinkable omissions for modern races. Likewise, he pressed track owners to modernize their tracks, including organizing driver boycotts of races at Spa-Francorchamps in 1969, the Nürburgring in 1970 being joined by his close friend Jochen Rindt, and Zandvoort in 1972 until barriers, run-off areas, fire crews, and medical facilities were improved. Some drivers and press members believed the safety improvements for which Stewart advocated detracted from the sport, while track owners and race organizers baulked at the extra costs. Stewart later said: "I would have been a much more popular World Champion if I had always said what people wanted to hear. I might have been dead, but definitely more popular."

== Consultant ==
While continuing to be a spokesman for safer cars and circuits in Formula One, Stewart began a partnership with the Ford Motor Company in 1964 that lasted 25 years. Signing on to promote Ford products in Britain, as a consultant he trained Ford's engineers how to recognize through first hand experience, various improvement opportunities in the development of new automobiles.

== Commentator ==
=== ABC's Wide World of Sports and NBC Sportsworld ===
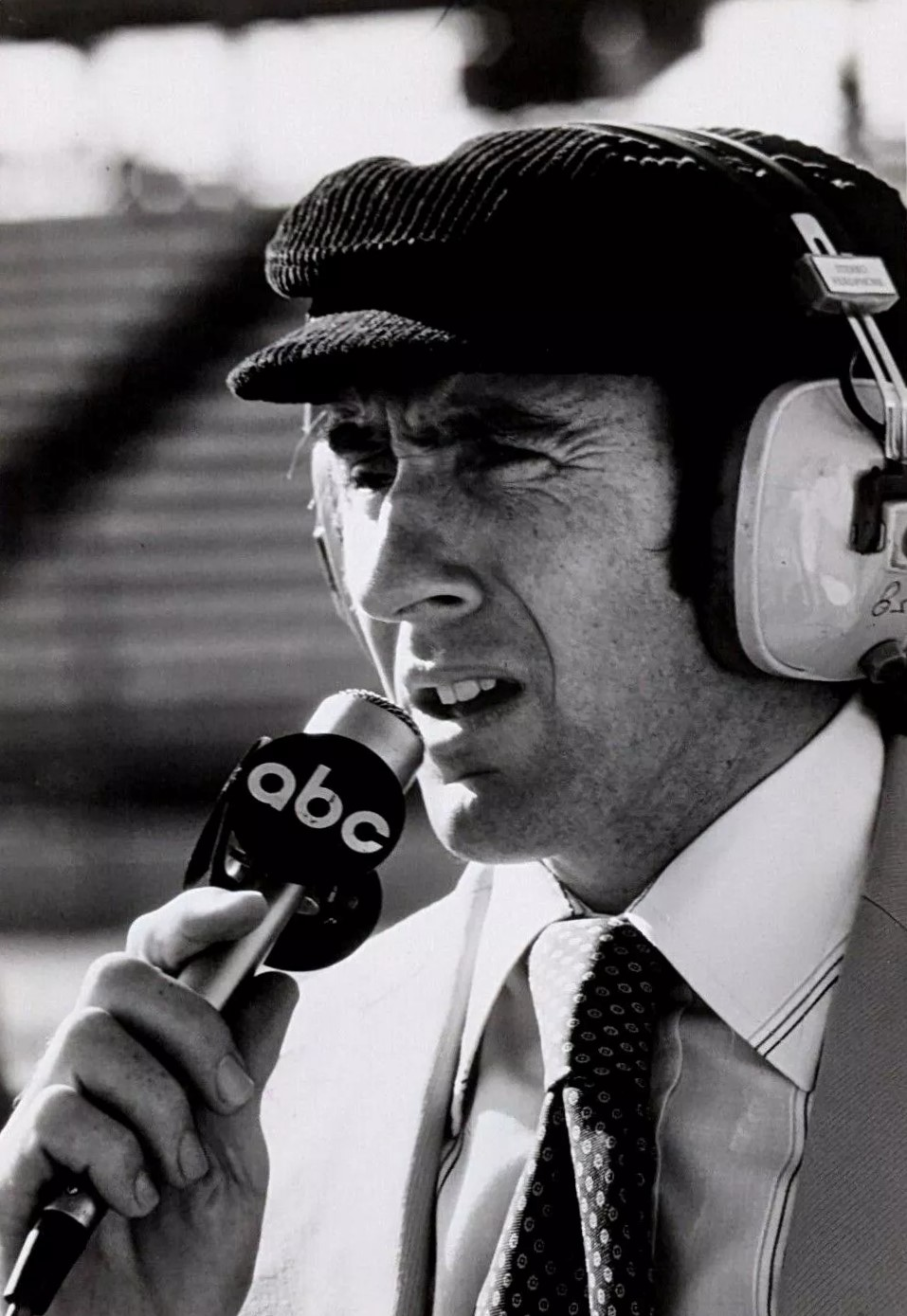
Stewart during his ABC tenure, 1978

During the period 1971 to 1986, Stewart covered F1 races, NASCAR races and Indy car races (including the Indianapolis 500) as a color commentator, and also functioned as host for the latter. He was a play-by-play announcer for the Luge at the 1976 Winter Olympics and the Equestrian at the 1976 Summer Olympics (partnered with Chris Schenkel) on ABC's Wide World of Sports. He was noted for his insightful analysis, Scottish accent, and rapid delivery, which once caused ABC's lead sports commentator Jim McKay to remark that Stewart spoke almost as fast as he drove. In his book Winning Is Not Enough, Stewart revealed that he used notes to read from to do a TV broadcast as he could not read from an autocue due to his dyslexia.

In 2023, Stewart revealed on the Beyond the Grid Podcast "I was doing ABC's Wide World of Sports because I was reasonably good at it, I got to know how to do it by a man called Jim McKay who is the best commentator of sport in the world whether it was the Olympics or all sorts of different sports. I would go to Atlanta, Georgia to do a Stock Car race and we would be telecasting it not live, it would be for the following week or week after that. I would fly in Concorde more often than anything else and fly into the location was of a race, ABC had all the things organised so I would have a helicopter to get me out of the track and get me back into the night flight, I would never take Concorde on the evening flight because it was slower sleeping on a plane than on a 747 but I would always use Concorde from the UK or Switzerland to the United States. I had it very well organised."

Stewart was often critical of driver safety in his broadcasts especially of driver negligence with fireproof clothes. In the 1977 Daytona 500, Bobby Wawak got burned after his car caught fire, Stewart said: "The drivers themselves are negligent, drivers should always wear flame resistant underwear and thermal underwear. The accident we seen today is just typical if you're not properly protected." Stewart also revealed there was tension between him and ABC Sports producer Roone Arledge as Stewart was doing commercials for Ford Motor Company as well and several of the commercials aired on Wide World of Sports which he was a regular commentator there and that led him to leaving ABC in 1986. Stewart revealed in his book that "Wide World of Sports began to lose its soul when ABC first merged with ESPN and then with Capital Cities, prompting severe headcount cuts and reduced budgets." Later, Stewart covered CART-sanctioned Indy car races starting at Long Beach in 1987 on NBC SportsWorld, along with Paul Page. He returned in 1988, along with Charlie Jones. Stewart only covered road course and street races in his brief time at NBC. He did not return in 1989 and was replaced by Johnny Rutherford and Tom Sneva.

=== Australian and Canadian TV coverage ===
Stewart worked on Australian and Canadian TV coverage from late 1986 to the mid-1990s.

=== British TV coverage ===
Stewart occasionally appeared with Murray Walker as a co-commentator on the BBC's F1 coverage, including the British Grands Prix of 1979 and 1993.

== Team owner ==
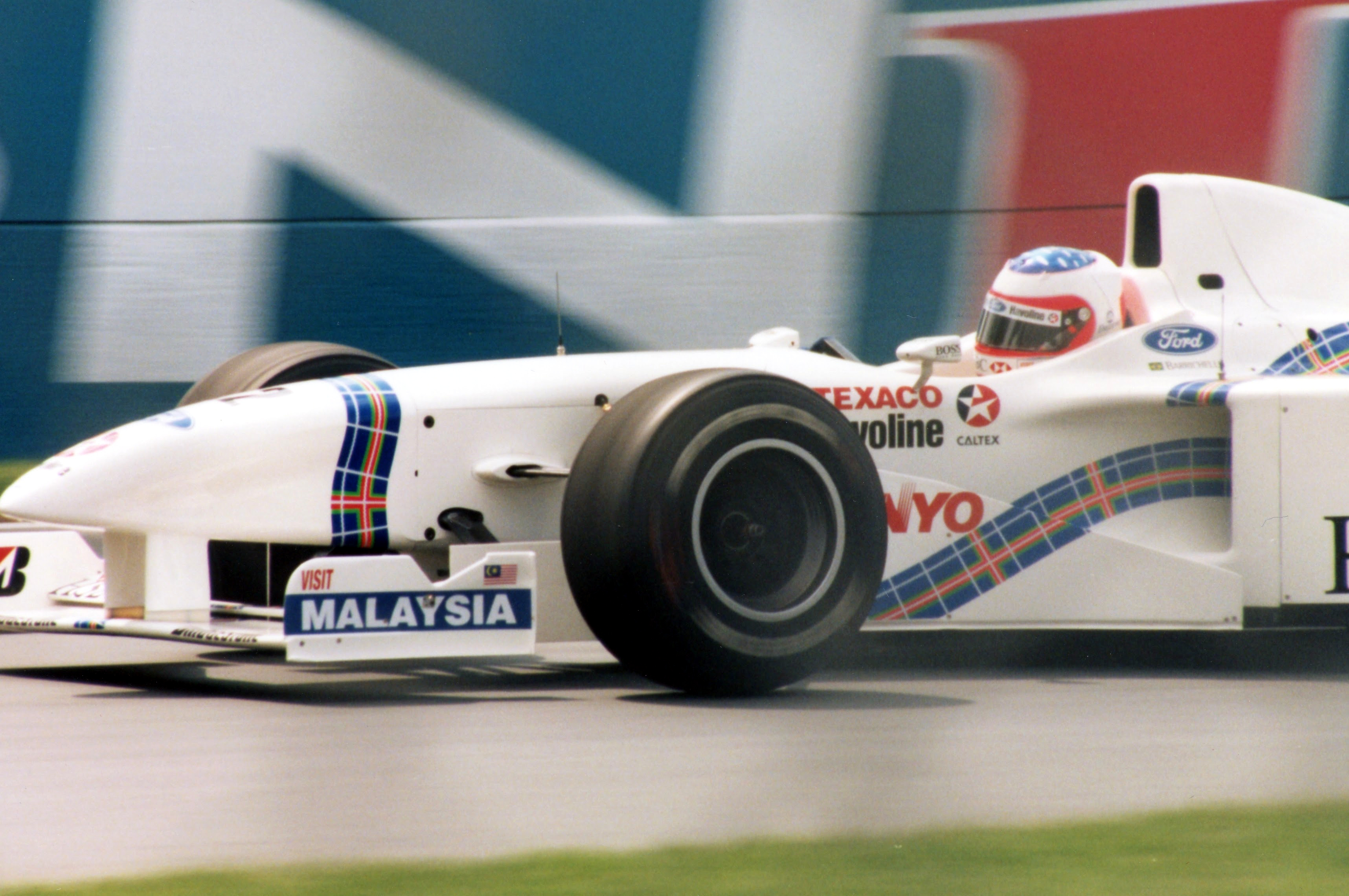
Rubens Barrichello driving for Stewart's F1 team in 1997.

In 1997, Stewart returned to Formula One, with Stewart Grand Prix, as a team owner in partnership with his son, Paul. The team was a development of the previous Paul Stewart Racing team that had previously competed in lower formulae. As the works Ford team, their first race was the 1997 Australian Grand Prix. The only success of their first year came at the rain-affected Monaco Grand Prix where Rubens Barrichello finished second. The following year, 1998, was less competitive, with no podiums and few points.

After Ford acquired Cosworth in July 1998, the team risked designing and building a new engine for 1999. The SF3 was consistently competitive throughout the season. The team won one race at the European Grand Prix at the Nürburgring with Johnny Herbert, while Barrichello took three third places, pole in France, and briefly led his home race at Interlagos. The team was later bought by Ford and became Jaguar Racing in 2000 (which subsequently became Red Bull Racing in 2005). Stewart is also the head sports consultant/patron for the Royal Bank of Scotland. In March 2009, he waived his fee for the year in response to the bank losing £24bn in 2008.

== Honours and awards ==
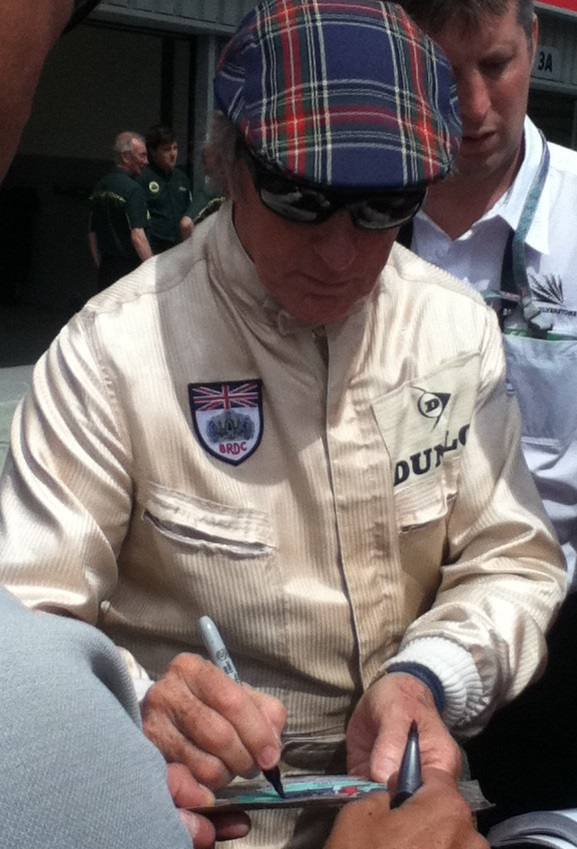
Stewart in the Silverstone pit lane for the 2014 British Grand Prix

Nicknamed "The Flying Scot", Stewart was awarded the Hawthorn Memorial Trophy in 1969 and from 1971 to 1973. Stewart then received Sports Illustrated magazine's 1973 "Sportsman of the Year" award, the only auto racer to have won the title. In the same year, he also won BBC Television's "Sports Personality of the Year" award, and was named as ABC's Wide World of Sports Athlete of the Year, which he shared with American pro football player O. J. Simpson. In 1990, he was inducted into the International Motorsports Hall of Fame. In 1996, he was awarded an honorary doctorate by Heriot-Watt University in Edinburgh. In 1998 Stewart received an honorary doctorate from Cranfield University where he later served as chairman of the steering committee for the MSc Motorsport Engineering and Management.

Stewart was a subject of the television programme This Is Your Life in January 1970 where he was surprised by Eamonn Andrews at Thames Television's Euston Road Studios. In the 1971 Birthday Honours Stewart was created an Officer of the Order of the British Empire (OBE). In 2001, he received a knighthood. In both cases, the honour was for services to motor racing. In 2002, he became a founding patron of the Scottish Sports Hall of Fame and an inaugural inductee. In 2003 the World Forum on the Future of Sport Shooting Activities presented Stewart the Sport Shooting Ambassador Award. The Award goes to an outstanding individual whose efforts have promoted the shooting sports internationally. On 27 November 2008, Stewart was awarded an honorary Doctor of Science (D.Sc.) degree from the University of St Andrews.

On 26 June 2009, Stewart was awarded the Freedom of West Dunbartonshire at a special ceremony in his hometown of Dumbarton. In 2010, Stewart was named as a founding member of Motor Sport magazine's Hall of Fame. On 28 January 2012, Stewart gave the starting command for the 50th Anniversary of the Rolex 24 at Daytona. He assumed the role after previously announced Grand Marshal A. J. Foyt was forced to cancel his visit due to complications from his recent knee surgery. In 2020, the British magazine The Economist ranked champion drivers by the relative importance of car quality to driver skill. According to this ranking, Stewart was the 4th best driver of all time, behind Juan Manuel Fangio, Jim Clark, and Alain Prost. Objective mathematical models, such as Eichenberger and Stadelmann (2009, 4th), original F1metrics (2014, 2nd), Bell et al. (2015, 4th), FiveThirtyEight (2018, 20th), and updated F1metrics (2019, 2nd), put Stewart consistently among the greatest Formula One drivers ever.

== Other appearances ==
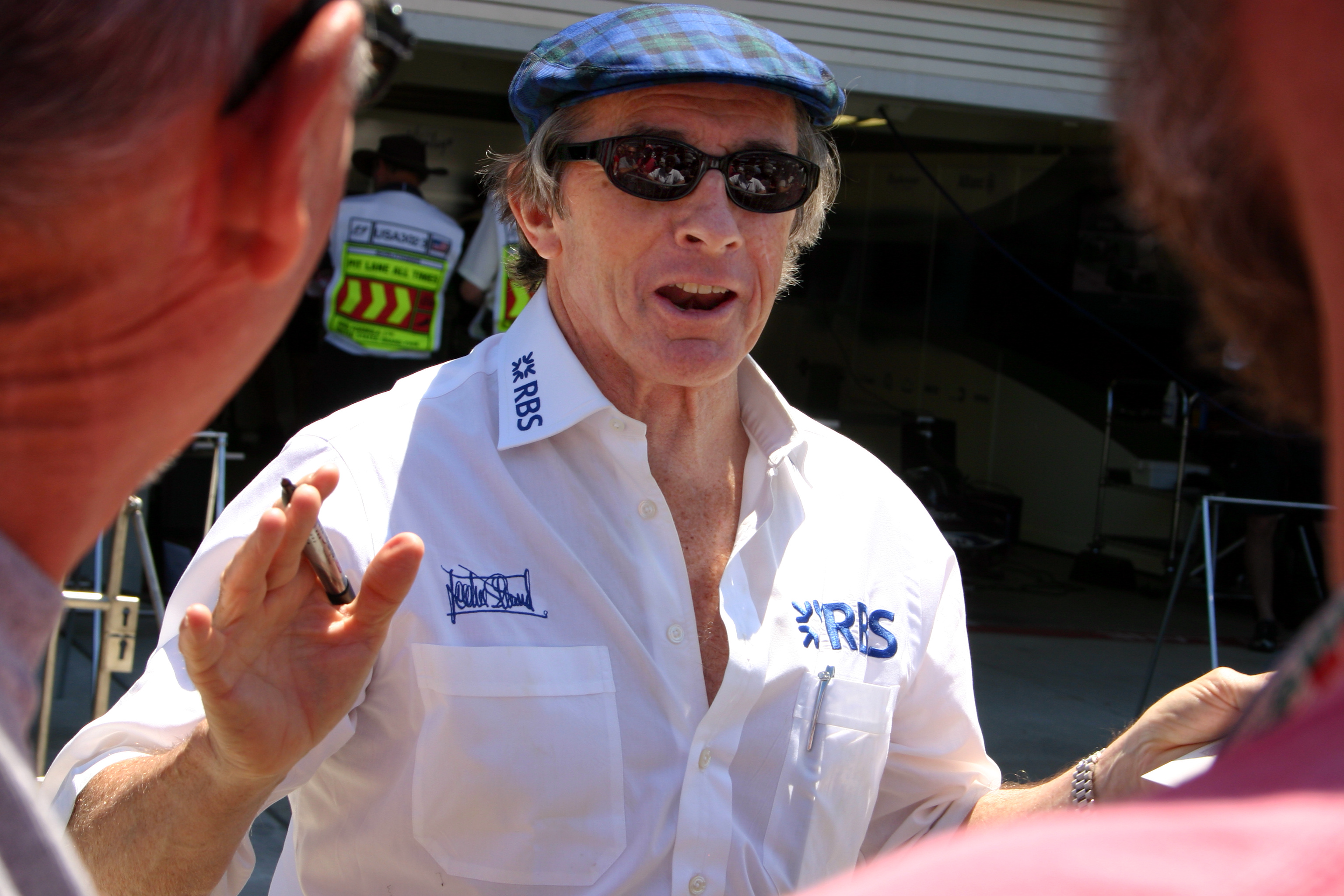
Stewart greets fans in the pit lane at the 2005 United States Grand Prix at Indianapolis

Stewart appears in the 1966 John Frankenheimer movie Grand Prix doing all the driving scenes for actor Brian Bedford, who played Scott Stoddard, as Bedford did not know how to drive. Stewart was the subject in the 1972 Roman Polanski-produced film Weekend of a Champion, in which Polanski shadows him throughout a race weekend at the 1971 Monaco Grand Prix. He appeared in an anachronistic cameo in a 1977 episode of Lupin III as a competitor in the 1977 Monaco Grand Prix. In 1979, George Harrison, a good friend of Stewart's, released a single titled like Stewart's book, "Faster", as a tribute to Stewart, Niki Lauda, Ronnie Peterson who was killed in 1978, and to other Formula One race car drivers. In the video, Stewart acted as Harrison's limousine chauffeur, wearing a cap with his trademark tartan.

Stewart appeared as a spokesman, with his son Mark, in a 1983 commercial for the Vectrex game console. Stewart also wrote the foreword for the book The Centenary of the Car 1885–1985 by Andrew Whyte in 1984. He participated in Prince Edward's 1987 charity television special, The Grand Knockout Tournament.

Stewart featured in a special presentation video of the then all new Ford Mondeo in 1993, the video was given away free on the front cover of What Car? magazine in 1993. He was featured in the video to the 2000 song "Supreme" by British singer, Robbie Williams. Stewart appeared in several UPS commercials in 2002 and 2003 as a consultant for Dale Jarrett to convince Jarrett to "race the Big Brown truck". He also once appeared on the UK motoring program Top Gear as a driving instructor for host James May. He is also interviewed in some depth in Martin Scorsese's 2011 documentary biography of Harrison, George Harrison: Living in the Material World. 2018 saw the 50th anniversary of the relationship between Stewart and luxury watch brand Rolex. In 2018, he Stewart appeared in US commercials for Heineken beer, in which he refused an offered beer saying "I'm still driving" before driving away in a Jaguar F-Type.

== Helmet ==
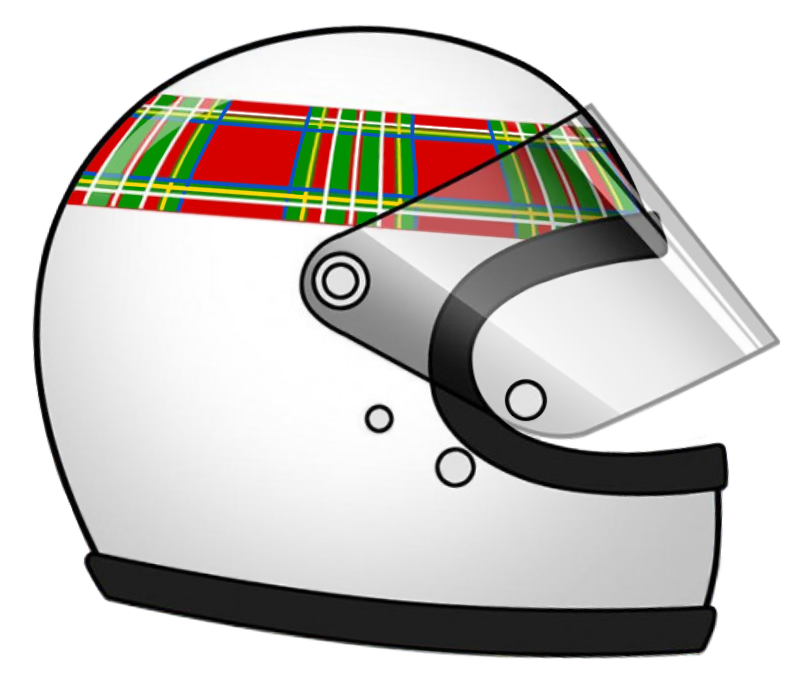
Stewart's crash helmet with Royal Stewart Tartan

Stewart's helmet was white, with the red, green, blue, white, and yellow Royal Stewart tartan surrounding the top.

== Personal life ==
Stewart has been married to his childhood sweetheart Helen McGregor since 1962, and they have two sons: Paul and Mark. Paul is a former racing driver, who later ran Paul Stewart Racing with his father, before selling it in 1999. Mark is a film and television producer. Between 1969 and 1997 the couple lived in Begnins, near Lake Geneva in Switzerland, and later sold the house to Phil Collins.

Stewart dictated his autobiography titled Winning Is Not Enough due to his dyslexia. In a 2009 interview, and in the book, he discusses his close relationship with his older brother Jimmy, who was also a successful racing driver in his youth but had suffered from alcoholism for many years, and died in 2008. In 2014 Helen McGregor Stewart was diagnosed with frontotemporal dementia.

In 2018, Stewart set up the charity Race Against Dementia. By that time Helen had limited short-term memory and impaired mobility, and required round-the-clock care. Stewart believes that the application of Formula 1's technology and out-of-the box thinking could bring about earlier solutions to society coping with-dementia. By 2025 Helen's "horrendous" behaviour and language changes had become even worse, and she did not recognise Jackie when sitting beside him. Stewart's charity Race Against Dementia was funding development of a blood test hoped to detect non-genetic frontotemporal dementia 10 to 20 years before it is otherwise diagnosed.

== Racing record ==
=== Career summary ===
Season	Series	Team	Races	Wins	Poles	F/laps	Podiums	Points	Position
1964	British Formula Three	Tyrrell Racing Organisation	8	7	4	7	7	54	**1st**
1964	French Formula Three	Tyrrell Racing Organisation	?	?	?	?	?	0	NC
1964	Trophées de France	Team Lotus	3	0	0	0	2	12	5th
1964	British Formula Two	Team Lotus	2	1	0	0	2	0	NC
1964	British Saloon Car Championship – Class B	Red Rose Motors	2	0	0	0	0	4	6th
1965	Formula One	Owen Racing Organisation	10	1	0	0	5	33	**3rd**
1965	British Formula Two	Tyrrell Racing Organisation	4	0	0	1	1	6	8th
1965	Trophées de France	Tyrrell Racing Organisation	3	0	1	0	0	4	9th
1965	24 Hours of Le Mans	Owen Racing Organisation	1	0	0	0	0	N/A	10th
1966	Formula One	Owen Racing Organisation	8	1	0	0	1	14	7th
1966	Tasman Series	Owen Racing Organisation	8	4	3	5	5	45	**1st**
1966	Trophées de France	Tyrrell Racing Organisation	4	0	0	0	0	8	5th
1966	Can-Am	Mecom Racing Enterprises	2	0	0	0	0	0	NC
1966	USAC Championship Car	Mecom Racing Enterprises	1	0	0	0	0	0	NC
1966	British Formula Two	Tyrrell Racing Organisation	1	0	0	0	0	0	NC
1967	Formula One	Owen Racing Organisation	11	0	0	0	2	10	9th
1967	Tasman Series	Owen Racing Organisation	6	2	3	1	2	18	**2nd**
1967	European Formula Two	Tyrrell Racing Organisation	5	1	1	1	3	0	NC^{‡}
1967	USAC Championship Car	Mecom Racing Enterprises	1	0	0	0	0	0	NC
1968	Formula One	Matra International	10	3	0	2	4	36	**2nd**
1969	Formula One	Matra International	11	6	2	5	7	63	**1st**
1969	European Formula Two	Matra International	4	2	0	2	4	0	NC^{‡}
1970	Formula One	Tyrrell Racing Organisation	13	1	4	0	4	25	5th
1970	British Saloon Car Championship – Class C	Team Broadspeed	1	0	1	1	0	0	NC
1970	Can-Am	Chaparral Cars Inc.	1	0	0	1	0	0	NC
1971	Formula One	Elf Team Tyrrell	11	6	6	3	7	62	**1st**
1971	Can-Am	Carl Haas Racing	10	2	2	1	4	76	**3rd**
1972	Formula One	Elf Team Tyrrell	11	4	2	4	5	45	**2nd**
1973	Formula One	Elf Team Tyrrell	14	5	3	1	8	71	**1st**
1973	European Touring Car Championship – Div. II	Ford Köln	3	0	1	0	0	0	NC

^{‡} Graded drivers not eligible for European Formula Two Championship points

=== Complete British Formula Three results ===
(key) (Races in bold indicate pole position) (Races in italics indicate fastest lap)

Year	Entrant	Chassis	Engine	1	2	3	4	5	6	7	8	9	10	DC	Pts
1964	Tyrrell Racing Organisation	Cooper T72	BMC	MAL	SNE; 1	**GOO**; 1	**OUL**; 1	AIN; 1	SIL; 1	MAL; 1	**BRH**; 6	**OUL**; 1	MAL	**1st**	**54 (55)**

=== Complete British Saloon Car Championship results ===
(key) (Races in bold indicate pole position; races in italics indicate fastest lap.)

Year	Team	Car	Class	1	2	3	4	5	6	7	8	9	10	11	12	DC	Pts	Class
1964	Red Rose Motors	Ford Cortina Lotus	B	SNE	GOO	OUL ovr:? cls:4	AIN ovr:6 cls:4	SIL	CRY	BRH	OUL					21st	4	6th
1970	Team Broadspeed	Ford Escort TC	C	BRH	SNE	THR	SIL	CRY	SIL	SIL ovr:26 cls:10	CRO	BRH	OUL	BRH	BRH	NC	0	NC

=== Complete Formula One World Championship results ===
(key) (Races in bold indicate pole position, races in italics indicate fastest lap)

Year	Entrant	Chassis	Engine	1	2	3	4	5	6	7	8	9	10	11	12	13	14	15	WDC	Pts
1965	Owen Racing Organisation	BRM P261	BRM P56 1.5 V8	RSA; 6	MON; 3	BEL; 2	FRA; 2	GBR; 5	NED; 2	GER; Ret	ITA; 1	USA; Ret	MEX; Ret						**3rd**	**33 (34)**
1966	Owen Racing Organisation	BRM P261	BRM P60 2.0 V8	MON; 1	BEL; Ret	FRA	GBR; Ret	NED; 4	GER; 5										7th	14
1966	Owen Racing Organisation	BRM P83	BRM P75 3.0 H16							ITA; Ret	USA; Ret	MEX; Ret							7th	14
1967	Owen Racing Organisation	BRM P83	BRM P75 3.0 H16	RSA; Ret		NED; Ret	BEL; 2		GBR; Ret										9th	10
1967	Owen Racing Organisation	BRM P261	BRM P60 2.1 V8		MON; Ret			FRA; 3											9th	10
1967	Owen Racing Organisation	BRM P115	BRM P75 3.0 H16							GER; Ret	CAN; Ret	ITA; Ret	USA; Ret	MEX; Ret					9th	10
1968	Matra International	Matra MS9	Ford Cosworth DFV 3.0 V8	RSA; Ret	ESP	MON													**2nd**	**36**
1968	Matra International	Matra MS10	Ford Cosworth DFV 3.0 V8				BEL; 4	NED; 1	FRA; 3	GBR; 6	GER; 1	ITA; Ret	CAN; 6	USA; 1	MEX; 7				**2nd**	**36**
1969	Matra International	Matra MS10	Ford Cosworth DFV 3.0 V8	RSA; 1															**1st**	**63**
1969	Matra International	Matra MS80	Ford Cosworth DFV 3.0 V8		ESP; 1	**MON**; Ret	NED; 1	**FRA**; 1	GBR; 1	GER; 2	ITA; 1	CAN; Ret	USA; Ret	MEX; 4					**1st**	**63**
1970	Tyrrell Racing Organisation	March 701	Ford Cosworth DFV 3.0 V8	**RSA**; 3	ESP; 1	**MON**; Ret	**BEL**; Ret	NED; 2	FRA; 9	GBR; Ret	GER; Ret	AUT; Ret	ITA; 2						5th	25
1970	Tyrrell Racing Organisation	Tyrrell 001	Ford Cosworth DFV 3.0 V8											**CAN**; Ret	USA; Ret	MEX; Ret			5th	25
1971	Elf Team Tyrrell	Tyrrell 001	Ford Cosworth DFV 3.0 V8	**RSA**; 2															**1st**	**62**
1971	Elf Team Tyrrell	Tyrrell 003	Ford Cosworth DFV 3.0 V8		ESP; 1	**MON**; 1	NED; 11	**FRA**; 1	GBR; 1	**GER**; 1	AUT; Ret	ITA; Ret	**CAN**; 1	**USA**; 5					**1st**	**62**
1972	Elf Team Tyrrell	Tyrrell 003	Ford Cosworth DFV 3.0 V8	ARG; 1	**RSA**; Ret	ESP; Ret			FRA; 1	GBR; 2	GER; 11								**2nd**	**45**
1972	Elf Team Tyrrell	Tyrrell 004	Ford Cosworth DFV 3.0 V8				MON; 4	BEL											**2nd**	**45**
1972	Elf Team Tyrrell	Tyrrell 005	Ford Cosworth DFV 3.0 V8									AUT; 7	ITA; Ret	CAN; 1	**USA**; 1				**2nd**	**45**
1973	Elf Team Tyrrell	Tyrrell 005	Ford Cosworth DFV 3.0 V8	ARG; 3	BRA; 2														**1st**	**71**
1973	Elf Team Tyrrell	Tyrrell 006	Ford Cosworth DFV 3.0 V8			RSA; 1	ESP; Ret	BEL; 1	**MON**; 1	SWE; 5	**FRA**; 4	GBR; 10	NED; 1	**GER**; 1	AUT; 2	ITA; 4	CAN; 5	USA; DNS	**1st**	**71**

=== Non-championship Formula One results ===
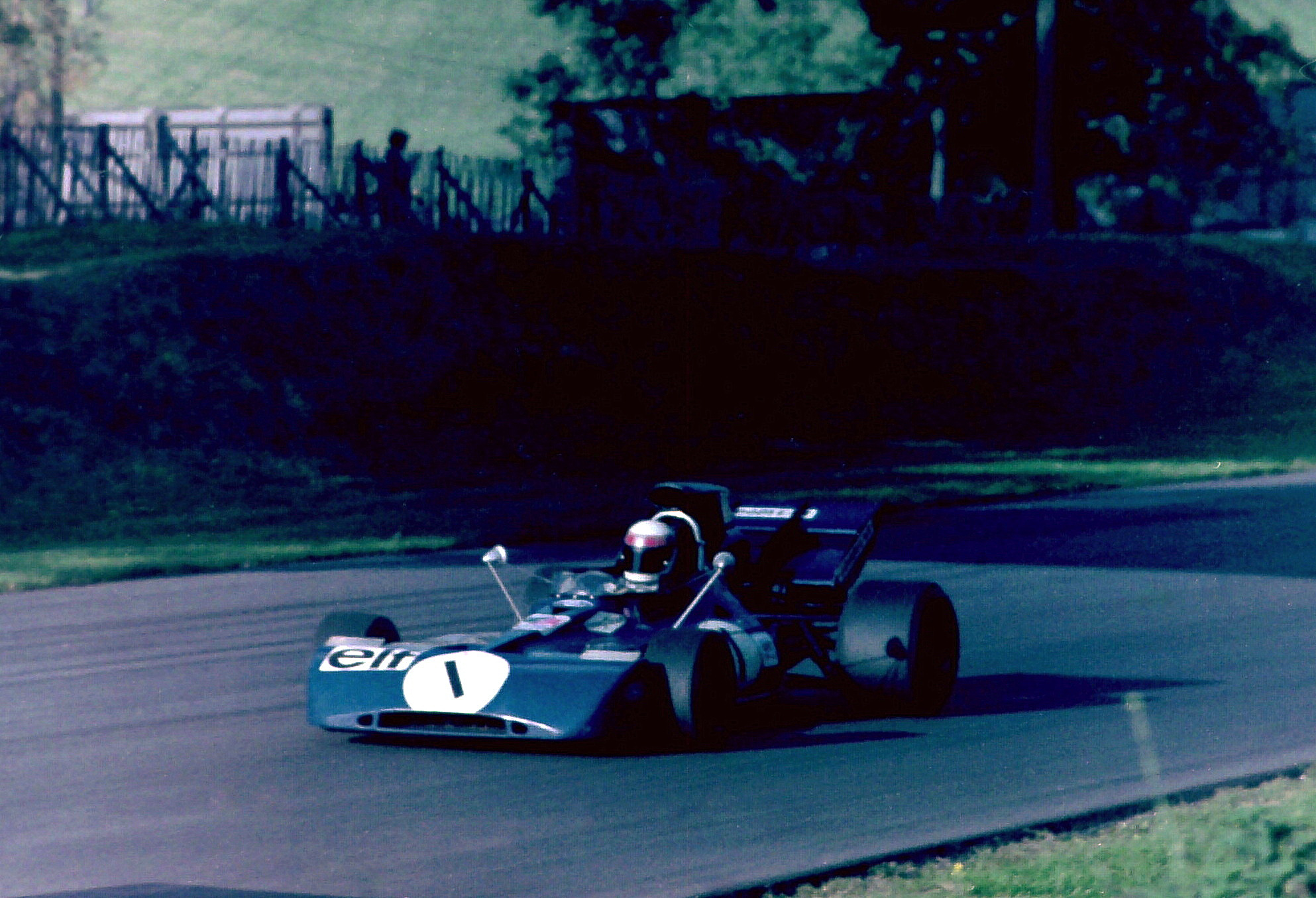
Stewart on his way to third place in the World Championship Victory Race at Brands Hatch in 1971

(key) (Races in bold indicate pole position, races in italics indicate fastest lap)

Year	Entrant	Chassis	Engine	1	2	3	4	5	6	7	8
1964	Team Lotus	Lotus 33	Climax FWMV 1.5 V8	DMT	NWT	SYR	AIN	INT	SOL	MED	**RAN**; 17
1965	Owen Racing Organisation	BRM P261	BRM P56 1.5 V8	ROC; 2	SYR	**SMT**; 10	INT; 1	MED	RAN		
1966	Owen Racing Organisation	BRM P83	BRM P75 3.0 H16	RSA	SYR	INT	OUL; Ret				
1967	Owen Racing Organisation	BRM P83	BRM P75 3.0 H16	ROC	SPC; Ret	**INT**; Ret	SYR				
1967	Tyrrell Racing Organisation	Matra MS7	Ford Cosworth FVA 1.6 L4					OUL; 2	ESP; Ret		
1968	Matra International	Matra MS10	Ford Cosworth DFV 3.0 V8	ROC; 6	INT	OUL; 1					
1969	Matra International	Matra MS80	Ford Cosworth DFV 3.0 V8	ROC; 1			**OUL**; 9				
1969	Matra International	Matra MS10	Ford Cosworth DFV 3.0 V8		**INT**; 3	MAD					
1970	Tyrrell Racing Organisation	March 701	Ford Cosworth DFV 3.0 V8	**ROC**; 1	INT; 2						
1970	Tyrrell Racing Organisation	Tyrrell 001	Ford Cosworth DFV 3.0 V8			OUL; Ret					
1971	Elf Team Tyrrell	Tyrrell 001	Ford Cosworth DFV 3.0 V8	ARG	**ROC**; 2	**QUE**; 2	**SPR**; 3				
1971	Elf Team Tyrrell	Tyrrell 003	Ford Cosworth DFV 3.0 V8					INT; Ret	RIN	OUL	VIC; 3
1973	Elf Team Tyrrell	Tyrrell 006	Ford Cosworth DFV 3.0 V8	ROC	INT; 1						

=== Complete Tasman Series results ===
(key) (Races in bold indicate pole position; results in italics indicate fastest lap)

Year	Entrant	Chassis	Engine	1	2	3	4	5	6	7	8	Pos.	Pts
1966	Owen Racing Organisation	BRM P261	BRM P60 1.9 V8	PUK; 2	LEV; Ret	**WIG**; 1	TER; 1	WAR; 4	**LAK**; Ret	SAN; 1	**LON**; 1	**1st**	**45**
1967	Owen Racing Organisation	BRM P261	BRM P111 2.1 V8	**PUK**; 1	**WIG**; Ret	LAK; Ret	**WAR**; 1	SAN; Ret	LON; Ret			**2nd**	**18**

=== Non-championship Tasman Series results ===
Year	Entrant	Chassis	Engine	1	2
1967	Owen Racing Organisation	BRM P261	BRM P111 2.1 V8	LEV; 2	TER

=== Complete 24 Hours of Le Mans results ===
Year	Team	Co-drivers	Car	Class	Laps	Pos.	Class pos.
1965	(United Kingdom) Owen Racing Organisation	(United Kingdom) Graham Hill	Rover-BRM	P 2.0	284	10th	**2nd**

=== Indianapolis 500 results ===
Year	Car	Start	Qual	Rank	Finish	Laps	Led	Retired
1966	43	11	159.972	14	6	190	40	Oil Pressure
1967	24	29	164.099	13	18	168	0	Engine
**Totals**						358	40	

=== Complete Canadian-American Challenge Cup results ===
(key) (Races in bold indicate pole position) (Races in italics indicate fastest lap)

Year	Team	Car	Engine	1	2	3	4	5	6	7	8	9	10	Pos	Pts
1966	(United States) John W. Mecom Jr.	Lola T70 Mk. 2	Ford	MTR	BRI	MOS	LAG; DNS								
1966	(United States) John W. Mecom Jr.	Lola T70 Mk. 2	Chevrolet					RIV; Ret	LVG; Ret						
1970	(United States) Chaparral Cars	Chaparral 2J	Chevrolet	MOS	MTR	**WGL**; Ret	EDM	MOH	ROA	ATL	BRD	LAG	RIV		
1971	(United States) Carl Haas Racing	Lola T260	Chevrolet	**MOS**; Ret	MTR; 1	ATL; 11	**WGL**; Ret	MOH; 1	ROA; Ret	BRD; 6	EDM; 2	LAG; 2	RIV; Ret	3rd	76

== See also ==
- Grand Prix Drivers' Association
- Sid Watkins

== Notes ==
Sporting positions
Preceded by Richard Attwood	Monaco Formula Three; Race winner 1964	Succeeded by Peter Revson
Preceded by None	British Formula 3 Championship; BARC; Series Champion; 1964	Succeeded by Roy Pike
Preceded by Jack Brabham	BRDC International Trophy; Winner; 1965	Succeeded by Jack Brabham
Preceded by Jim Clark	Tasman Series Champion; 1966	Succeeded by Jim Clark
Preceded by Mario Andretti	Indianapolis 500; Rookie of the Year; 1966	Succeeded by Denis Hulme
Preceded by Graham Hill	Formula One World Champion; 1969	Succeeded by Jochen Rindt
Preceded by Bruce McLaren	Brands Hatch Race of Champions; Winner; 1969–1970	Succeeded by Clay Regazzoni
Preceded by Jochen Rindt	Formula One World Champion; 1971	Succeeded by Emerson Fittipaldi
Preceded by Emerson Fittipaldi	BRDC International Trophy; Winner; 1973	Succeeded by James Hunt
Preceded by Emerson Fittipaldi	Formula One World Champion; 1973	Succeeded by Emerson Fittipaldi
Preceded by Ken Tyrrell	British Racing Drivers' Club; President; 2000–2006	Succeeded by Damon Hill
Preceded by John Surtees	Oldest Living Formula One Champion; 10 March 2017 – present	Incumbent
Records
Preceded by Jim Clark; 25 wins (1960 – 1968)	Most Grand Prix wins 27 wins, 26th at the 1973 Dutch GP	Succeeded by Alain Prost; 51 wins, 28th at the 1987 Portuguese GP
Awards
Preceded by Graham Hill	Hawthorn Memorial Trophy; 1969	Succeeded by Denny Hulme
Preceded by Denny Hulme	Hawthorn Memorial Trophy; 1971–1973	Succeeded by Denny Hulme
Preceded by Mary Peters	BBC Sports Personality of the Year; 1973	Succeeded by Brendan Foster
