= Lotus 31 =

Lotus Formula Three racing car

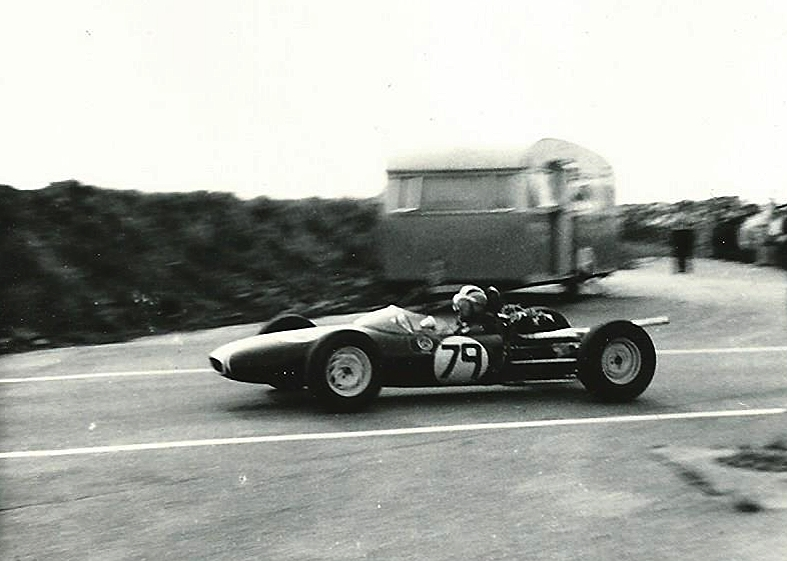
Lotus 31

The Lotus 31 was a racing car produced by Lotus for the new 1-litre Formula 3 introduced in 1964, replacing the expensive Formula Junior. The chassis was a multi-tubular spaceframe, of similar design to the 1962 Lotus 22 Formula Junior. A 997 cc (60.8 cu in) Ford Cosworth 105E with Single Choke Weber or SU carburettors produced 97 bhp (72 kW) at 8000rpm. The 31 had little success against the more advanced monocoque cars that dominated in 1964. Records show only 12 were built in 1964/5.

In 1966 19 cars were built with the Chassis 22/F3. The relative simplicity and low price of the car made it an ideal training car. Motor Racing Stables at Brands Hatch ran four cars to graduate students from Lotus Cortinas. The Jim Russell Racing Driver School ran the cars at Snetterton, later being recognised, as a club, by the RAC. The Jim Russell School ran five 31s at Brands Hatch BARC Trophy Races in July 1967.
