= Cooper Grand Prix results =

The table below details the complete World Championship Grand Prix results of the Formula One constructor Cooper between 1950 and 1969. It includes results from the works team as well as privately entered cars. Since the Constructors' Championship points were awarded to chassis-engine combinations rather than entrants, the table is sorted first by engine manufacturer then by entrant.

== Complete Formula One World Championship results ==
(key)

Year	Entrant	Chassis	Engine	Tyres	Driver	1	2	3	4	5	6	7	8	9	10	11	12	Constructor	Points	WCC
1950	Horschell Racing Corporation	T12	JAP 1.1 V2	D		GBR	MON	500	SUI	BEL	FRA	ITA						Cooper-JAP	n/a	n/a (Note: The Constructors Championship not awarded until 1958.)
1950	Horschell Racing Corporation	T12	JAP 1.1 V2	D	(United States) Harry Schell		Ret											Cooper-JAP	n/a	n/a
1952	Leslie D. Hawthorn	T20	Bristol BS1 2.0 L6	D		SUI	500	BEL	FRA	GBR	GER	NED	ITA					Cooper-Bristol	n/a	n/a
1952	Leslie D. Hawthorn	T20	Bristol BS1 2.0 L6	D	(United Kingdom) Mike Hawthorn			4		3		4	NC					Cooper-Bristol	n/a	n/a
1952	AHM Bryde	T20	Bristol BS1 2.0 L6	D	(United Kingdom) Mike Hawthorn				Ret									Cooper-Bristol	n/a	n/a
1952	AHM Bryde	T20	Bristol BS1 2.0 L6	D	(United Kingdom) Reg Parnell					7								Cooper-Bristol	n/a	n/a
1952	Ecurie Richmond	T20	Bristol BS1 2.0 L6	D	(United Kingdom) Alan Brown	8		9		20			13					Cooper-Bristol	n/a	n/a
1952	Ecurie Richmond	T20	Bristol BS1 2.0 L6	D	(United Kingdom) Eric Brandon	5		6		22			15					Cooper-Bristol	n/a	n/a
1952	Ecurie Ecosse	T20	Bristol BS1 2.0 L6	D	(United Kingdom) David Murray					Ret								Cooper-Bristol	n/a	n/a
1953	Cooper Car Company	T20; T23	Bristol BS1 2.0 L6	D		ARG	500	NED	BEL	FRA	GBR	GER	SUI	ITA				Cooper-Bristol	n/a	n/a
1953	Cooper Car Company	T20; T23	Bristol BS1 2.0 L6	D	(United Kingdom) John Barber	8												Cooper-Bristol	n/a	n/a
1953	Cooper Car Company	T20; T23	Bristol BS1 2.0 L6	D	(Argentina) Adolfo Schwelm Cruz	Ret												Cooper-Bristol	n/a	n/a
1953	Cooper Car Company	T20; T23	Bristol BS1 2.0 L6	D	(United Kingdom) Alan Brown	9												Cooper-Bristol	n/a	n/a
1953	R.J. Chase	T23	Bristol BS1 2.0 L6	D	(United Kingdom) Alan Brown						Ret							Cooper-Bristol	n/a	n/a
1953	Equipe Anglaise	T23	Bristol BS1 2.0 L6	D	(United Kingdom) Alan Brown							Ret		12				Cooper-Bristol	n/a	n/a
1953	Equipe Anglaise	T23	Bristol BS1 2.0 L6	D	(Germany) Helmut Glöckler							DNS						Cooper-Bristol	n/a	n/a
1953	Ken Wharton	T23	Bristol BS1 2.0 L6	D	(United Kingdom) Ken Wharton			Ret		Ret	8		7	NC				Cooper-Bristol	n/a	n/a
1953	Bob Gerard	T23	Bristol BS1 2.0 L6	D	(United Kingdom) Bob Gerard					11	Ret							Cooper-Bristol	n/a	n/a
1953	Rodney Nuckey	T23	Bristol BS1 2.0 L6	D	(United Kingdom) Rodney Nuckey							11						Cooper-Bristol	n/a	n/a
1953	Ecurie Ecosse	T20	Bristol BS1 2.0 L6	D	(United Kingdom) Jimmy Stewart						Ret							Cooper-Bristol	n/a	n/a
1953	Tony Crook	T20	Bristol BS1 2.0 L6	D	(United Kingdom) Tony Crook						Ret							Cooper-Bristol	n/a	n/a
1953	Cooper Car Company	Special; T24	Alta GP 2.5 L4	D	(United Kingdom) Stirling Moss					Ret		6		13				Cooper-Alta	n/a	n/a
1953	Atlantic Stable	T24	Alta GP 2.5 L4	D	(United Kingdom) Peter Whitehead						9							Cooper-Alta	n/a	n/a
1954	Bob Gerard	T23	Bristol BS1 2.0 L6	D		ARG	500	BEL	FRA	GBR	GER	SUI	ITA	ESP				Cooper-Bristol	n/a	n/a
1954	Bob Gerard	T23	Bristol BS1 2.0 L6	D	(United Kingdom) Bob Gerard					10								Cooper-Bristol	n/a	n/a
1954	Gould's Garage (Bristol)	T23	Bristol BS1 2.0 L6	D	(United Kingdom) Horace Gould					15								Cooper-Bristol	n/a	n/a
1954	Ecurie Richmond	T23	Bristol BS1 2.0 L6	D	(United Kingdom) Eric Brandon					Ret								Cooper-Bristol	n/a	n/a
1954	Ecurie Richmond	T23	Bristol BS1 2.0 L6	D	(United Kingdom) Rodney Nuckey					DNS								Cooper-Bristol	n/a	n/a
1954	R.J. Chase	T23	Bristol BS1 2.0 L6	D	(United Kingdom) Alan Brown					DNS								Cooper-Bristol	n/a	n/a
1954	Peter Whitehead	T24	Alta GP 2.5 L4	D	(United Kingdom) Peter Whitehead					Ret								Cooper-Alta	n/a	n/a
1955	Cooper Car Company	T40	Bristol BS1 2.0 L6	D		ARG	MON	500	BEL	NED	GBR	ITA						Cooper-Bristol	n/a	n/a
1955	Cooper Car Company	T40	Bristol BS1 2.0 L6	D	(Australia) Jack Brabham						Ret							Cooper-Bristol	n/a	n/a
1956	Bob Gerard	T23	Bristol BS1 2.0 L6	D		ARG	MON	500	BEL	FRA	GBR	GER	ITA					Cooper-Bristol	n/a	n/a
1956	Bob Gerard	T23	Bristol BS1 2.0 L6	D	(United Kingdom) Bob Gerard						11							Cooper-Bristol	n/a	n/a
1957	Cooper Car Company	T43	Climax FPF 2.0 L4; Climax FPF 1.5 L4	A D		ARG	MON	500	FRA	GBR	GER	PES	ITA					Cooper-Climax	n/a	n/a
1957	Cooper Car Company	T43	Climax FPF 2.0 L4; Climax FPF 1.5 L4	A D	(United Kingdom) Roy Salvadori					5	Ret	Ret						Cooper-Climax	n/a	n/a
1957	Cooper Car Company	T43	Climax FPF 2.0 L4; Climax FPF 1.5 L4	A D	(United Kingdom) Mike MacDowel				7 (Note: After Brabham retired from the race he took over the car of Mike MacDowel.)									Cooper-Climax	n/a	n/a
1957	Cooper Car Company	T43	Climax FPF 2.0 L4; Climax FPF 1.5 L4	A D	(United Kingdom) Les Leston		DNQ											Cooper-Climax	n/a	n/a
1957	Cooper Car Company	T43	Climax FPF 2.0 L4; Climax FPF 1.5 L4	A D	(Australia) Jack Brabham		6		7			7						Cooper-Climax	n/a	n/a
1957	R.R.C. Walker Racing Team	T43	Climax FPF 2.0 L4	D	(Australia) Jack Brabham					Ret								Cooper-Climax	n/a	n/a
1957	R.R.C. Walker Racing Team	T43	Climax FPF 1.5 L4	D	(Australia) Jack Brabham						Ret							Cooper-Climax	n/a	n/a
1957	J.B. Naylor	T43	Climax FPF 1.5 L4	D	(United Kingdom) Brian Naylor						13							Cooper-Climax	n/a	n/a
1957	Ridgeway Management	T41; T43	Climax FPF 1.5 L4	D	(United Kingdom) Tony Marsh						15							Cooper-Climax	n/a	n/a
1957	Ridgeway Management	T41; T43	Climax FPF 1.5 L4	D	(Australia) Paul England						Ret							Cooper-Climax	n/a	n/a
1957	Dick Gibson	T43	Climax FPF 1.5 L4	D	(United Kingdom) Dick Gibson						Ret							Cooper-Climax	n/a	n/a
1957	Bob Gerard	T44	Bristol BS2 2.2 L6	D	(United Kingdom) Bob Gerard					6								Cooper-Bristol	n/a	n/a
1958	R.R.C. Walker Racing Team	T43; T45	Climax FPF 2.0 L4	C D		ARG	MON	NED	500	BEL	FRA	GBR	GER	POR	ITA	MOR		Cooper-Climax	31	3rd
1958	R.R.C. Walker Racing Team	T43; T45	Climax FPF 2.0 L4	C D	(France) Maurice Trintignant		1	9				8	3	8	Ret	Ret		Cooper-Climax	31	3rd
1958	R.R.C. Walker Racing Team	T43; T45	Climax FPF 2.0 L4	C D	(United Kingdom) Stirling Moss	1												Cooper-Climax	31	3rd
1958	R.R.C. Walker Racing Team	T43; T45	Climax FPF 2.0 L4	C D	(United Kingdom) Ron Flockhart		DNQ											Cooper-Climax	31	3rd
1958	R.R.C. Walker Racing Team	T43	Climax FPF 1.5 L4	D	(France) François Picard											Ret		Cooper-Climax	31	3rd
1958	Cooper Car Company	T45; T44	Climax FPF 2.0 L4; Climax FPF 1.5 L4	D	(United Kingdom) Roy Salvadori		Ret	4		8	11	3	2	9	5	7		Cooper-Climax	31	3rd
1958	Cooper Car Company	T45; T44	Climax FPF 2.0 L4; Climax FPF 1.5 L4	D	(Australia) Jack Brabham		4	8		Ret	6	6	Ret	7	Ret	11		Cooper-Climax	31	3rd
1958	Cooper Car Company	T45; T44	Climax FPF 2.0 L4; Climax FPF 1.5 L4	D	(New Zealand) Bruce McLaren								5			13		Cooper-Climax	31	3rd
1958	Cooper Car Company	T45; T44	Climax FPF 2.0 L4; Climax FPF 1.5 L4	D	(United Kingdom) Jack Fairman											8		Cooper-Climax	31	3rd
1958	Cooper Car Company	T45; T44	Climax FPF 2.0 L4; Climax FPF 1.5 L4	D	(United Kingdom) Ian Burgess							Ret						Cooper-Climax	31	3rd
1958	High Efficiency Motors	T43	Climax FPF 1.5 L4	D	(United Kingdom) Ian Burgess								7					Cooper-Climax	31	3rd
1958	Tony Marsh	T45	Climax FPF 1.5 L4	D	(United Kingdom) Tony Marsh								8					Cooper-Climax	31	3rd
1958	Robert La Caze	T45	Climax FPF 1.5 L4	D	(Morocco) Robert La Caze											14		Cooper-Climax	31	3rd
1958	André Guelfi	T45	Climax FPF 1.5 L4	D	(France) André Guelfi											15		Cooper-Climax	31	3rd
1958	Dick Gibson	T43	Climax FPF 1.5 L4	D	(United Kingdom) Dick Gibson								Ret					Cooper-Climax	31	3rd
1958	Ecurie Eperon d'Or	T43	Climax FPF 1.5 L4	D	(Belgium) Christian Goethals								Ret					Cooper-Climax	31	3rd
1958	J.B. Naylor	T45	Climax FPF 1.5 L4	D	(United Kingdom) Brian Naylor								Ret					Cooper-Climax	31	3rd
1958	Scuderia Centro Sud	T43	Climax FPF 1.5 L4	D	(Germany) Wolfgang Seidel								Ret					Cooper-Climax	31	3rd
1958	British Racing Partnership	T45	Climax FPF 1.5 L4	D	(United Kingdom) Tom Bridger											Ret		Cooper-Climax	31	3rd
1959	Cooper Car Company	T51	Climax FPF 2.5 L4	D		MON	500	NED	FRA	GBR	GER	POR	ITA	USA				Cooper-Climax	40 (53)	1st
1959	Cooper Car Company	T51	Climax FPF 2.5 L4	D	(Australia) Jack Brabham	1^{F}		2	3	1^{P}	Ret	Ret	3	4				Cooper-Climax	40 (53)	1st
1959	Cooper Car Company	T51	Climax FPF 2.5 L4	D	(New Zealand) Bruce McLaren	5			5	3^{F}	Ret	Ret	Ret	1				Cooper-Climax	40 (53)	1st
1959	Cooper Car Company	T51	Climax FPF 2.5 L4	D	(United States) Masten Gregory	Ret		3	Ret	7	Ret	2						Cooper-Climax	40 (53)	1st
1959	Cooper Car Company	T51	Climax FPF 2.5 L4	D	(Italy) Giorgio Scarlatti								12					Cooper-Climax	40 (53)	1st
1959	R.R.C. Walker Racing Team	T51	Climax FPF 2.5 L4	D	(France) Maurice Trintignant	3		8	11	5	4	4	9	2^{F}				Cooper-Climax	40 (53)	1st
1959	R.R.C. Walker Racing Team	T51	Climax FPF 2.5 L4	D	(United Kingdom) Stirling Moss	Ret^{P}		Ret^{F}			Ret	1^{P}^{F}	1^{P}	Ret^{P}				Cooper-Climax	40 (53)	1st
1959	R.H.H. Parnell	T45; T51	Climax FPF 1.5 L4	D	(United Kingdom) Henry Taylor					11								Cooper-Climax	40 (53)	1st
1959	R.H.H. Parnell	T45; T51	Climax FPF 1.5 L4	D	(United Kingdom) Tim Parnell					DNQ								Cooper-Climax	40 (53)	1st
1959	Alan Brown Equipe	T45	Climax FPF 1.5 L4	D	(United Kingdom) Peter Ashdown					12								Cooper-Climax	40 (53)	1st
1959	Alan Brown Equipe	T45	Climax FPF 1.5 L4	D	(United Kingdom) Mike Taylor					Ret								Cooper-Climax	40 (53)	1st
1959	High Efficiency Motors	T45	Climax FPF 2.5 L4	D	(United Kingdom) Jack Fairman					Ret								Cooper-Climax	40 (53)	1st
1959	Ecurie Bleue	T51	Climax FPF 2.5 L4	D	(United States) Harry Schell									Ret				Cooper-Climax	40 (53)	1st
1959	Taylor-Crawley Racing Team	T51	Climax FPF 2.5 L4	D	(United States) George Constantine									Ret				Cooper-Climax	40 (53)	1st
1959	Equipe Nationale Belge	T51	Climax FPF 1.5 L4	D	(Belgium) Alain de Changy	DNQ												Cooper-Climax	40 (53)	1st
1959	Equipe Nationale Belge	T51	Climax FPF 1.5 L4	D	(Belgium) Lucien Bianchi	DNQ												Cooper-Climax	40 (53)	1st
1959	British Racing Partnership	T51	Climax FPF 1.5 L4	D	(United Kingdom) Ivor Bueb	DNQ												Cooper-Climax	40 (53)	1st
1959	Jean Lucienbonnet	T45	Climax FPF 1.5 L4	D	(France) Jean Lucienbonnet	DNQ												Cooper-Climax	40 (53)	1st
1959	Ace Garage – Rotherham	T51	Climax FPF 1.5 L4	D	(United Kingdom) Trevor Taylor					DNQ								Cooper-Climax	40 (53)	1st
1959	Gilby Engineering	T45	Climax FPF 1.5 L4	D	(United Kingdom) Keith Greene					DNQ								Cooper-Climax	40 (53)	1st
1959	United Racing Stable	T51	Climax FPF 2.5 L4	D	(United Kingdom) Bill Moss					DNQ								Cooper-Climax	40 (53)	1st
1959	Scuderia Centro Sud	T51	Maserati 250S 2.5 L6	D	(United Kingdom) Ian Burgess				Ret	Ret	6		14					Cooper-Maserati	0	-
1959	Scuderia Centro Sud	T51	Maserati 250S 2.5 L6	D	(Portugal) Mario Araujo de Cabral							10						Cooper-Maserati	0	-
1959	Scuderia Centro Sud	T51	Maserati 250S 2.5 L6	D	(United Kingdom) Colin Davis				Ret				11					Cooper-Maserati	0	-
1959	Scuderia Centro Sud	T51	Maserati 250S 2.5 L6	D	(Germany) Hans Herrmann					Ret								Cooper-Maserati	0	-
1959	High Efficiency Motors	T45	Maserati 250S 2.5 L6	D	(United Kingdom) Roy Salvadori	6			Ret					Ret				Cooper-Maserati	0	-
1959	High Efficiency Motors	T45	Maserati 250S 2.5 L6	D	(United Kingdom) Jack Fairman								Ret					Cooper-Maserati	0	-
1959	British Racing Partnership	T51	Borgward 1500 RS 1.5 L6	D	(United Kingdom) Chris Bristow					10								Cooper-Borgward	0	-
1959	British Racing Partnership	T51	Borgward 1500 RS 1.5 L6	D	(United Kingdom) Ivor Bueb					13								Cooper-Borgward	0	-
1959	OSCA Automobili	T43	OSCA 2.0 L6	D	(Argentina) Alejandro de Tomaso									Ret				Cooper-OSCA	0	-
1960	Cooper Car Company	T51; T53	Climax FPF 2.5 L4	D		ARG	MON	500	NED	BEL	FRA	GBR	POR	ITA	USA			Cooper-Climax	48 (58)	1st
1960	Cooper Car Company	T51; T53	Climax FPF 2.5 L4	D	(Australia) Jack Brabham	Ret	DSQ		1	1^{P}^{F}	1^{P}^{F}	1^{P}	1		4^{F}			Cooper-Climax	48 (58)	1st
1960	Cooper Car Company	T51; T53	Climax FPF 2.5 L4	D	(New Zealand) Bruce McLaren	1	2^{F}		Ret	2	3	4	2		3			Cooper-Climax	48 (58)	1st
1960	Cooper Car Company	T51; T53	Climax FPF 2.5 L4	D	(United States) Chuck Daigh							Ret						Cooper-Climax	48 (58)	1st
1960	Cooper Car Company	T51; T53	Climax FPF 2.5 L4	D	(United Kingdom) Ron Flockhart										Ret			Cooper-Climax	48 (58)	1st
1960	Yeoman Credit Racing Team	T51	Climax FPF 2.5 L4	D	(Belgium) Olivier Gendebien					3	2	9	7		12			Cooper-Climax	48 (58)	1st
1960	Yeoman Credit Racing Team	T51	Climax FPF 2.5 L4	D	(United Kingdom) Tony Brooks		4		Ret	Ret		5	5		Ret			Cooper-Climax	48 (58)	1st
1960	Yeoman Credit Racing Team	T51	Climax FPF 2.5 L4	D	(United Kingdom) Henry Taylor				7		4	8	DNS		14			Cooper-Climax	48 (58)	1st
1960	Yeoman Credit Racing Team	T51	Climax FPF 2.5 L4	D	(United States) Phil Hill										6			Cooper-Climax	48 (58)	1st
1960	Yeoman Credit Racing Team	T51	Climax FPF 2.5 L4	D	(United Kingdom) Chris Bristow		Ret		Ret	Ret								Cooper-Climax	48 (58)	1st
1960	Yeoman Credit Racing Team	T51	Climax FPF 2.5 L4	D	(United Kingdom) Bruce Halford						8							Cooper-Climax	48 (58)	1st
1960	Fred Tuck Cars	T51	Climax FPF 2.5 L4	D	(United Kingdom) Bruce Halford		DNQ											Cooper-Climax	48 (58)	1st
1960	Fred Tuck Cars	T51	Climax FPF 2.5 L4	D	(Belgium) Lucien Bianchi						Ret	Ret						Cooper-Climax	48 (58)	1st
1960	Equipe Nationale Belge	T45	Climax FPF 2.5 L4	D	(Belgium) Lucien Bianchi					6								Cooper-Climax	48 (58)	1st
1960	R.R.C. Walker Racing Team	T51	Climax FPF 2.5 L4	D	(France) Maurice Trintignant	3 (Note: After Moss retired from the race he took over the car of Trintignant. Neither driver received any points for their shared drive.)												Cooper-Climax	48 (58)	1st
1960	R.R.C. Walker Racing Team	T51	Climax FPF 2.5 L4	D	(United Kingdom) Stirling Moss	3^{P}^{F}												Cooper-Climax	48 (58)	1st
1960	R.R.C. Walker Racing Team	T51	Climax FPF 2.5 L4	D	(United States) Lance Reventlow							PO						Cooper-Climax	48 (58)	1st
1960	High Efficiency Motors	T51	Climax FPF 2.5 L4	D	(United Kingdom) Roy Salvadori		Ret								8			Cooper-Climax	48 (58)	1st
1960	Ecurie Maarsbergen	T51	Climax FPF 1.5 L4	D	(Netherlands) Carel Godin de Beaufort				8									Cooper-Climax	48 (58)	1st
1960	Scuderia Colonia	T43	Climax FPF 1.5 L4	D	(Italy) Piero Drogo									8				Cooper-Climax	48 (58)	1st
1960	Wolfgang Seidel	T45	Climax FPF 1.5 L4	D	(Germany) Wolfgang Seidel									9				Cooper-Climax	48 (58)	1st
1960	Ecurie Bleue	T51	Climax FPF 2.2 L4	D	(United States) Harry Schell	Ret												Cooper-Climax	48 (58)	1st
1960	C.T. Atkins	T51	Climax FPF 2.5 L4	D	(United Kingdom) Jack Fairman							Ret						Cooper-Climax	48 (58)	1st
1960	Arthur Owen	T45	Climax FPF 2.2 L4	D	(United Kingdom) Arthur Owen									Ret				Cooper-Climax	48 (58)	1st
1960	Equipe Prideaux/Dick Gibson	T43	Climax FPF 1.5 L4	D	(United Kingdom) Vic Wilson									Ret				Cooper-Climax	48 (58)	1st
1960	Scuderia Centro Sud	T51	Maserati 250S 2.5 L6	D	(Argentina) Carlos Menditeguy	4												Cooper-Maserati	3	5th
1960	Scuderia Centro Sud	T51	Maserati 250S 2.5 L6	D	(United States) Masten Gregory		DNQ		DNS		9	14	Ret					Cooper-Maserati	3	5th
1960	Scuderia Centro Sud	T51	Maserati 250S 2.5 L6	D	(Germany) Wolfgang von Trips										9			Cooper-Maserati	3	5th
1960	Scuderia Centro Sud	T51	Maserati 250S 2.5 L6	D	(United Kingdom) Ian Burgess		DNQ					Ret		10	Ret			Cooper-Maserati	3	5th
1960	Scuderia Centro Sud	T51	Maserati 250S 2.5 L6	D	(Argentina) Roberto Bonomi	11												Cooper-Maserati	3	5th
1960	Scuderia Centro Sud	T51	Maserati 250S 2.5 L6	D	(France) Maurice Trintignant		Ret		Ret		Ret				15			Cooper-Maserati	3	5th
1960	Scuderia Centro Sud	T51	Maserati 250S 2.5 L6	D	(Portugal) Mário de Araújo Cabral								Ret					Cooper-Maserati	3	5th
1960	Scuderia Centro Sud	T51	Maserati 250S 2.5 L6	D	(United States) Alfonso Thiele									Ret				Cooper-Maserati	3	5th
1960	Gilby Engineering	T45	Maserati 250S 2.5 L6	D	(United Kingdom) Keith Greene							Ret						Cooper-Maserati	3	5th
1960	Scuderia Eugenio Castellotti	T51	Castellotti 2.5 L4	D	(Italy) Giulio Cabianca									4				Cooper-Castellotti	3	6th
1960	Scuderia Eugenio Castellotti	T51	Castellotti 2.5 L4	D	(Italy) Gino Munaron						Ret	15		Ret				Cooper-Castellotti	3	6th
1960	Scuderia Eugenio Castellotti	T51	Castellotti 2.5 L4	D	(Italy) Giorgio Scarlatti		DNQ							Ret				Cooper-Castellotti	3	6th
1960	Fred Armbruster	T51	Ferrari 107 2.5 L4	D	(United States) Pete Lovely										11			Cooper-Ferrari	0	-
1961	Cooper Car Company	T55; T58	Climax FPF 1.5 L4; Climax FWMV 1.5 V8	D		MON	NED	BEL	FRA	GBR	GER	ITA	USA					Cooper-Climax	14 (18)	4th
1961	Cooper Car Company	T55; T58	Climax FPF 1.5 L4; Climax FWMV 1.5 V8	D	(New Zealand) Bruce McLaren	6	12	Ret	5	8	6	3	4					Cooper-Climax	14 (18)	4th
1961	Cooper Car Company	T55; T58	Climax FPF 1.5 L4; Climax FWMV 1.5 V8	D	(Australia) Jack Brabham	Ret	6	Ret	Ret	4	NC	Ret	Ret^{P}^{F}					Cooper-Climax	14 (18)	4th
1961	Yeoman Credit Racing Team	T53	Climax FPF 1.5 L4	D	(United Kingdom) John Surtees	11	7	5	Ret	Ret	5	Ret	Ret					Cooper-Climax	14 (18)	4th
1961	Yeoman Credit Racing Team	T53	Climax FPF 1.5 L4	D	(United Kingdom) Roy Salvadori				8	6	10	6	Ret					Cooper-Climax	14 (18)	4th
1961	H&L Motors	T53	Climax FPF 1.5 L4	D	(United Kingdom) Jackie Lewis			9	Ret	Ret	9	4						Cooper-Climax	14 (18)	4th
1961	John M. Wyatt III	T53	Climax FPF 1.5 L4	D	(United States) Roger Penske								8					Cooper-Climax	14 (18)	4th
1961	Camoradi International	T53	Climax FPF 1.5 L4	D	(United States) Masten Gregory	DNQ	DNS	10	12	11								Cooper-Climax	14 (18)	4th
1961	Camoradi International	T53	Climax FPF 1.5 L4	D	(United Kingdom) Ian Burgess						12							Cooper-Climax	14 (18)	4th
1961	Hap Sharp	T53	Climax FPF 1.5 L4	D	(United States) Hap Sharp								10					Cooper-Climax	14 (18)	4th
1961	Bernard Collomb	T53	Climax FPF 1.5 L4	D	(France) Bernard Collomb				Ret		NC							Cooper-Climax	14 (18)	4th
1961	Fred Tuck Cars	T45	Climax FPF 1.5 L4	D	(United Kingdom) Jack Fairman							Ret						Cooper-Climax	14 (18)	4th
1961	Momo Corporation	T53	Climax FPF 1.5 L4	D	(United States) Walt Hansgen								Ret					Cooper-Climax	14 (18)	4th
1961	Scuderia Serenissima	T51	Maserati 6-1500 1.5 L4	D	(France) Maurice Trintignant	7		Ret	13		Ret	9						Cooper-Maserati	0	-
1961	Scuderia Centro Sud	T51; T53	Maserati 6-1500 1.5 L4	D	(Italy) Lorenzo Bandini			Ret		12	Ret	8						Cooper-Maserati	0	-
1961	Scuderia Centro Sud	T51; T53	Maserati 6-1500 1.5 L4	D	(Italy) Massimo Natili					Ret		DNS						Cooper-Maserati	0	-
1961	Pescara Racing Team	T45	Maserati 6-1500 1.5 L4	D	(Italy) Renato Pirocchi							12						Cooper-Maserati	0	-
1962	Cooper Car Company	T53; T55; T60	Climax FPF 1.5 L4; Climax FWMV 1.5 V8	D		NED	MON	BEL	FRA	GBR	GER	ITA	USA	RSA				Cooper-Climax	29 (37)	3rd
1962	Cooper Car Company	T53; T55; T60	Climax FPF 1.5 L4; Climax FWMV 1.5 V8	D	(New Zealand) Bruce McLaren	Ret^{F}	1	Ret	4	3	5	3	3	2				Cooper-Climax	29 (37)	3rd
1962	Cooper Car Company	T53; T55; T60	Climax FPF 1.5 L4; Climax FWMV 1.5 V8	D	(South Africa) Tony Maggs	5	Ret	Ret	2	6	9	7	7	3				Cooper-Climax	29 (37)	3rd
1962	Cooper Car Company	T53; T55; T60	Climax FPF 1.5 L4; Climax FWMV 1.5 V8	D	(United States) Timmy Mayer								Ret					Cooper-Climax	29 (37)	3rd
1962	Ecurie Galloise	T53	Climax FPF 1.5 L4	D	(United Kingdom) Jackie Lewis	8			Ret	10	Ret							Cooper-Climax	29 (37)	3rd
1962	John Love	T55	Climax FPF 1.5 L4	D	(Federation of Rhodesia and Nyasaland) John Love									8				Cooper-Climax	29 (37)	3rd
1962	Anglo-American Equipe	T59	Climax FPF 1.5 L4	D	(United Kingdom) Ian Burgess					12	11	DNQ						Cooper-Climax	29 (37)	3rd
1962	Hap Sharp	T53	Climax FPF 1.5 L4	D	(United States) Hap Sharp								11					Cooper-Climax	29 (37)	3rd
1962	Bernard Collomb	T53	Climax FPF 1.5 L4	D	(France) Bernard Collomb						Ret							Cooper-Climax	29 (37)	3rd
1962	Mike Harris	T53	Alfa Romeo Giulietta 1.5 L4	D	(Federation of Rhodesia and Nyasaland) Mike Harris									Ret				Cooper-Alfa Romeo	0	-
1963	Cooper Car Company	T66	Climax FWMV 1.5 V8	D		MON	BEL	NED	FRA	GBR	GER	ITA	USA	MEX	RSA			Cooper-Climax	25 (26)	5th
1963	Cooper Car Company	T66	Climax FWMV 1.5 V8	D	(New Zealand) Bruce McLaren	3	2	Ret	12	Ret	Ret	3	11	Ret	4			Cooper-Climax	25 (26)	5th
1963	Cooper Car Company	T66	Climax FWMV 1.5 V8	D	(South Africa) Tony Maggs	5	7	Ret	2	9	Ret	6	Ret	Ret	7			Cooper-Climax	25 (26)	5th
1963	R.R.C. Walker Racing Team	T60	Climax FWMV 1.5 V8	D	(Sweden) Jo Bonnier	7	5	11	NC									Cooper-Climax	25 (26)	5th
1963	R.R.C. Walker Racing Team	T66	Climax FWMV 1.5 V8	D	(Sweden) Jo Bonnier					Ret	6	7	8	5	6			Cooper-Climax	25 (26)	5th
1963	John Love	T55	Climax FPF 1.5 L4	D	(Federation of Rhodesia and Nyasaland) John Love										9			Cooper-Climax	25 (26)	5th
1963	Scuderia Centro Sud	T60	Climax FWMV 1.5 V8	D	(Portugal) Mário de Araújo Cabral						Ret	DNQ						Cooper-Climax	25 (26)	5th
1963	Frank Dochnal	T51	Climax FPF 1.5 L4	D	(United States) Frank Dochnal									DNQ				Cooper-Climax	25 (26)	5th
1963	Scuderia Lupini	T51	Maserati 6-1500 1.5 L4	D	(South Africa) Trevor Blokdyk										12			Cooper-Maserati	0	-
1963	Scuderia Centro Sud	T53	Maserati 6-1500 1.5 L4	D	(Italy) Ernesto Brambilla							DNQ						Cooper-Maserati	0	-
1964	Cooper Car Company	T66; T73	Climax FWMV 1.5 V8	D		MON	NED	BEL	FRA	GBR	GER	AUT	ITA	USA	MEX			Cooper-Climax	16	5th
1964	Cooper Car Company	T66; T73	Climax FWMV 1.5 V8	D	(New Zealand) Bruce McLaren	Ret	7	2	6	Ret	Ret	Ret	2	Ret	7			Cooper-Climax	16	5th
1964	Cooper Car Company	T66; T73	Climax FWMV 1.5 V8	D	(United States) Phil Hill	9	8	Ret	7	6	Ret	Ret		Ret	9			Cooper-Climax	16	5th
1964	Cooper Car Company	T66; T73	Climax FWMV 1.5 V8	D	(Rhodesia) John Love								DNQ					Cooper-Climax	16	5th
1964	R.R.C. Walker Racing Team	T66	Climax FWMV 1.5 V8	D	(Sweden) Jo Bonnier	5												Cooper-Climax	16	5th
1964	R.R.C. Walker Racing Team	T66	Climax FWMV 1.5 V8	D	(Germany) Edgar Barth						Ret							Cooper-Climax	16	5th
1964	Fabre Urbain	T60	Climax FWMV 1.5 V8	D	(Switzerland) Jean-Claude Rudaz								DNS					Cooper-Climax	16	5th
1964	Bob Gerard Racing	T71/73	Ford 109E 1.5 L4	D	(United Kingdom) John Taylor					14								Cooper-Ford	0	-
1965	Cooper Car Company	T73; T77	Climax FWMV 1.5 V8	D		RSA	MON	BEL	FRA	GBR	NED	GER	ITA	USA	MEX			Cooper-Climax	14	5th
1965	Cooper Car Company	T73; T77	Climax FWMV 1.5 V8	D	(New Zealand) Bruce McLaren	5	5	3	Ret	10	Ret	Ret	5	Ret	Ret			Cooper-Climax	14	5th
1965	Cooper Car Company	T73; T77	Climax FWMV 1.5 V8	D	(Austria) Jochen Rindt	Ret	DNQ	11	Ret	14	Ret	4	8	6	Ret			Cooper-Climax	14	5th
1965	John Love	T55	Climax FPF 1.5 L4	D	(Rhodesia) John Love	Ret												Cooper-Climax	14	5th
1965	Bob Gerard Racing	T60	Climax FWMV 1.5 V8	D	(United Kingdom) John Rhodes					Ret								Cooper-Climax	14	5th
1965	Trevor Blokdyk	T59	Ford 109E 1.5 L4	D	(South Africa) Trevor Blokdyk	DNQ												Cooper-Ford	0	-
1965	Bob Gerard Racing	T71/73	Ford 109E 1.5 L4	D	(United Kingdom) Alan Rollinson					DNS								Cooper-Ford	0	-
1966	Cooper Car Company	T81	Maserati 9/F1 3.0 V12	D		MON	BEL	FRA	GBR	NED	GER	ITA	USA	MEX				Cooper-Maserati	30 (35)	3rd
1966	Cooper Car Company	T81	Maserati 9/F1 3.0 V12	D	(Austria) Jochen Rindt	Ret	2	4	5	Ret	3	4	2	Ret				Cooper-Maserati	30 (35)	3rd
1966	Cooper Car Company	T81	Maserati 9/F1 3.0 V12	D	(United Kingdom) John Surtees			Ret	Ret	Ret	2^{F}	Ret	3^{F}	1^{P}				Cooper-Maserati	30 (35)	3rd
1966	Cooper Car Company	T81	Maserati 9/F1 3.0 V12	D	(United States) Richie Ginther	Ret	5											Cooper-Maserati	30 (35)	3rd
1966	Cooper Car Company	T81	Maserati 9/F1 3.0 V12	D	(New Zealand) Chris Amon			8										Cooper-Maserati	30 (35)	3rd
1966	Cooper Car Company	T81	Maserati 9/F1 3.0 V12	D	(Mexico) Moisés Solana									Ret				Cooper-Maserati	30 (35)	3rd
1966	R.R.C. Walker Racing Team	T81	Maserati 9/F1 3.0 V12	D	(Switzerland) Jo Siffert		Ret	Ret	NC	Ret		Ret	4	Ret				Cooper-Maserati	30 (35)	3rd
1966	Anglo-Suisse Racing Team	T81	Maserati 9/F1 3.0 V12	F	(Sweden) Joakim Bonnier	NC	Ret			7	Ret	Ret	NC	6				Cooper-Maserati	30 (35)	3rd
1966	Guy Ligier	T81	Maserati 9/F1 3.0 V12	D	(France) Guy Ligier	NC	NC	NC	10	9	DNS							Cooper-Maserati	30 (35)	3rd
1966	J.A. Pearce Engineering Ltd	T73	Ferrari Tipo 168 3.0 V12	D	(United Kingdom) Chris Lawrence				11		Ret							Cooper-Ferrari	0	-
1967	Cooper Car Company	T81; T81B; T86	Maserati 9/F1 3.0 V12; Maserati 10/F1 3.0 V12	F		RSA	MON	NED	BEL	FRA	GBR	GER	CAN	ITA	USA	MEX		Cooper-Maserati	28	3rd
1967	Cooper Car Company	T81; T81B; T86	Maserati 9/F1 3.0 V12; Maserati 10/F1 3.0 V12	F	(Mexico) Pedro Rodríguez	1	5	Ret	9	6	5	8				6		Cooper-Maserati	28	3rd
1967	Cooper Car Company	T81; T81B; T86	Maserati 9/F1 3.0 V12; Maserati 10/F1 3.0 V12	F	(Austria) Jochen Rindt	Ret	Ret	Ret	4	Ret	Ret	Ret	Ret	4	Ret			Cooper-Maserati	28	3rd
1967	Cooper Car Company	T81; T81B; T86	Maserati 9/F1 3.0 V12; Maserati 10/F1 3.0 V12	F	(Belgium) Jacky Ickx									6	Ret			Cooper-Maserati	28	3rd
1967	Cooper Car Company	T81; T81B; T86	Maserati 9/F1 3.0 V12; Maserati 10/F1 3.0 V12	F	(United Kingdom) Alan Rees						9							Cooper-Maserati	28	3rd
1967	Cooper Car Company	T81; T81B; T86	Maserati 9/F1 3.0 V12; Maserati 10/F1 3.0 V12	F	(United Kingdom) Richard Attwood								10					Cooper-Maserati	28	3rd
1967	Rob Walker/Jack Durlacher Racing Team	T81	Maserati 9/F1 3.0 V12	F	(Switzerland) Jo Siffert	Ret	Ret	10	7	4	Ret	Ret	DNS	Ret	4	12		Cooper-Maserati	28	3rd
1967	Joakim Bonnier Racing Team	T81	Maserati 9/F1 3.0 V12	F	(Sweden) Joakim Bonnier	Ret			Ret		Ret	6	8	Ret	6	10		Cooper-Maserati	28	3rd
1967	Guy Ligier	T81	Maserati 9/F1 3.0 V12	F	(France) Guy Ligier				10	NC								Cooper-Maserati	28	3rd
1967	John Love	T79	Climax FPF 2.8 L4	D	(Rhodesia) John Love	2												Cooper-Climax	6	9th
1967	Tom Jones	T82	Climax FWMV 2.0 V8	F	(United States) Tom Jones								DNQ					Cooper-Climax	6	9th
1967	Charles Vögele Racing	T77	ATS 2.7 V8	D	(Switzerland) Silvio Moser						Ret							Cooper-ATS	0	-
1968	Cooper Car Company	T86B	BRM P101 3.0 V12	F		RSA	ESP	MON	BEL	NED	FRA	GBR	GER	ITA	CAN	USA	MEX	Cooper-BRM	14	7th
1968	Cooper Car Company	T86B	BRM P101 3.0 V12	F	(United Kingdom) Brian Redman		3		Ret									Cooper-BRM	14	7th
1968	Cooper Car Company	T86B	BRM P101 3.0 V12	F	(Italy) Ludovico Scarfiotti		4	4										Cooper-BRM	14	7th
1968	Cooper Car Company	T86B	BRM P101 3.0 V12	F	(Belgium) Lucien Bianchi			3	6	Ret			Ret		NC	NC	Ret	Cooper-BRM	14	7th
1968	Cooper Car Company	T86B	BRM P101 3.0 V12	F	(United Kingdom) Vic Elford						4	Ret	Ret	Ret	5	Ret	8	Cooper-BRM	14	7th
1968	Cooper Car Company	T86B	BRM P101 3.0 V12	F	(France) Johnny Servoz-Gavin						Ret							Cooper-BRM	14	7th
1968	Cooper Car Company	T86B	BRM P101 3.0 V12	F	(United Kingdom) Robin Widdows							Ret						Cooper-BRM	14	7th
1968	Cooper Car Company	T81B	Maserati 10/F1 3.0 V12	F	(United Kingdom) Brian Redman	Ret												Cooper-Maserati	0	-
1968	Cooper Car Company	T86	Maserati 10/F1 3.0 V12	F	(Italy) Ludovico Scarfiotti	Ret												Cooper-Maserati	0	-
1968	Rob Walker/Jack Durlacher Racing Team	T81	Maserati 9/F1 3.0 V12	F	(Switzerland) Jo Siffert	7												Cooper-Maserati	0	-
1968	Joakim Bonnier Racing Team	T81	Maserati 9/F1 3.0 V12	F	(Sweden) Joakim Bonnier	Ret												Cooper-Maserati	0	-
1968	John Love	T79	Climax FPF 2.8 L4	D	(South Africa) Basil van Rooyen	Ret												Cooper-Climax	0	-
1969	Antique Automobiles	T86	Maserati 10/F1 3.0 V12	G		RSA	ESP	MON	NED	FRA	GBR	GER	ITA	CAN	USA	MEX		Cooper-Maserati	0	-
1969	Antique Automobiles	T86	Maserati 10/F1 3.0 V12	G	(United Kingdom) Vic Elford			7										Cooper-Maserati	0	-
