= David Hobbs (racing driver) =

British racing driver and commentator (born 1939)

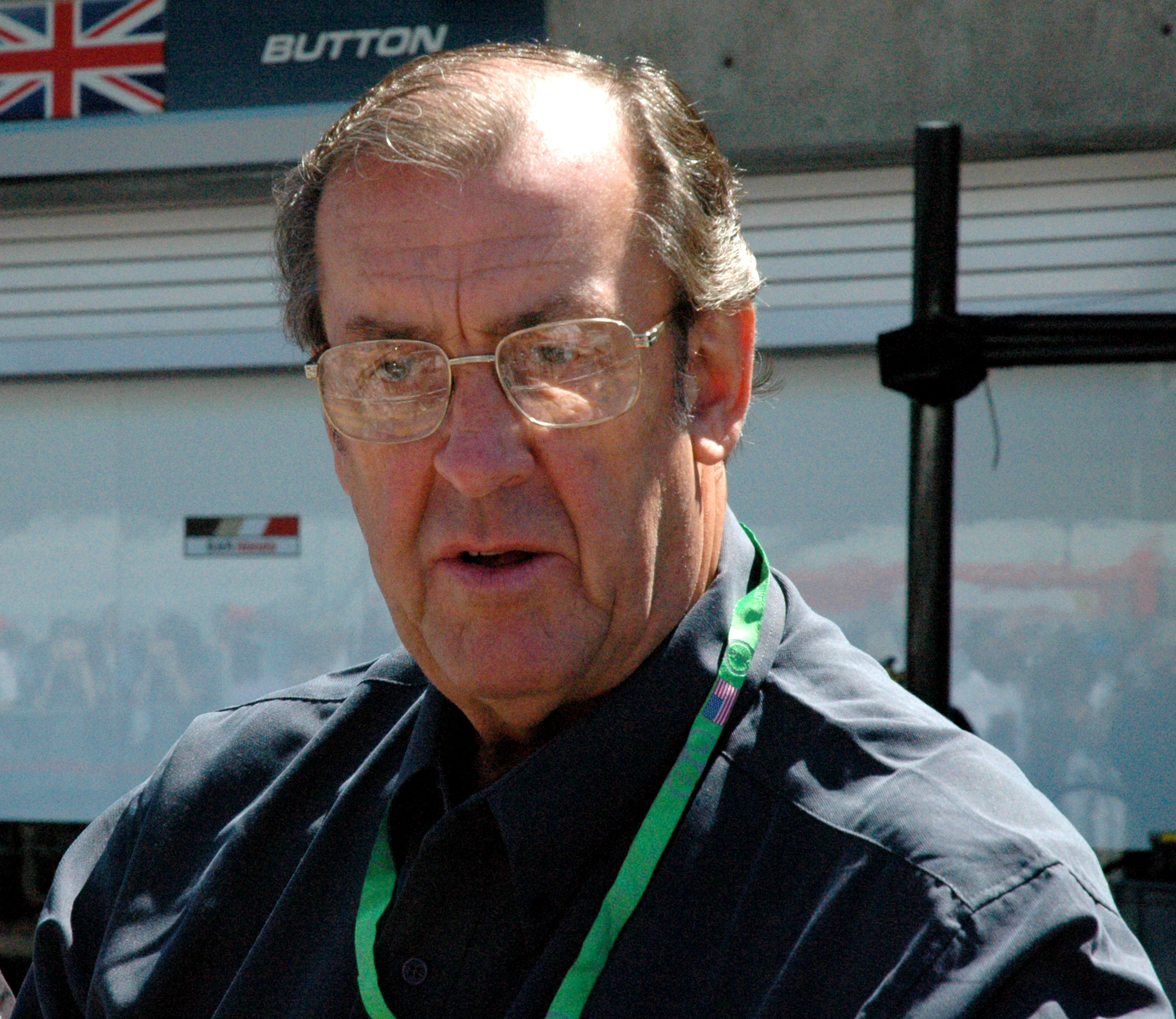
- Hobbs in the pitlane of the Indianapolis Motor Speedway at the 2005 United States Grand Prix
- Born: David Wishart Hobbs; 9 June 1939 (age 87); Royal Leamington Spa, Warwickshire, England

Formula One World Championship career
- Nationality: (United Kingdom) British
- Active years: 1967–1968, 1971, 1974
- Team(s): BRM, Honda, McLaren
- Entries: 7
- Championships: 0
- Wins: 0
- Podiums: 0
- Career points: 0
- Pole positions: 0
- Fastest laps: 0
- First entry: 1967 British Grand Prix
- Last entry: 1974 Italian Grand Prix
24 Hours of Le Mans career
- Years: 1962–72, 1979, 1981–85, 1987–89
- Teams: Team Lotus Engineering; Lola Cars Ltd; Standard Triumph; Maranello Concessionaires; John Wyer Automotive; Roger Penske/Kirk F. White; Equipe Matra-Simca; Grand Touring Cars/Ford France; EMKA Racing; John Fitzpatrick Racing; Joest Racing; Richard Lloyd Racing
- Best finish: 3rd (1969, 1984)
- Class wins: 1 (1982)

NASCAR Cup Series career
- 2 races run over 1 year
- First race: 1976 Daytona 500 (Daytona)
- Last race: 1976 Champion Spark Plug 400 (Michigan)
| Wins | Top tens | Poles |
|---|---|---|
| 0 | 0 | 0 |

David Wishart Hobbs (born 9 June 1939) is a British former racing driver. He worked as a commentator from the mid 1970s for CBS until 1996, Speed from 1996 to 2012 and NBC from 2013 to 2017. In 1969, Hobbs was included in the FIA list of graded drivers, a group of 27 drivers who by their achievements were rated the best in the world. Hobbs was inducted into the Motorsports Hall of Fame of America in 2009.

== Driving career ==
Hobbs was born in Royal Leamington Spa, England, just months before the outbreak of World War II. His career as an international racing driver spanned 30 years at all levels including in sports cars, touring cars, Indy cars, IMSA, Can-Am and Formula One. He has participated in the Indianapolis 500 and the 24 Hours of Daytona. He made twenty starts in the 24 Hours of Le Mans race, finishing in 8th place at the first attempt in 1962, following with a pole position and a best finish of third (in 1969 and 1984) to his credit.

Hobbs was due to make his F1 Grand Prix debut for Tim Parnell Racing at the 1965 French Grand Prix at Clermont-Ferrand, but a serious road accident put him in hospital for three weeks.

In 1971, Hobbs won the L&M 5000 Continental Championship driving for Carl Hogan out of St. Louis, Missouri, in a McLaren M10B-Chevrolet. He won five of the eight rounds that year at Laguna Seca, Seattle, Road America, Edmonton and Lime Rock. Twelve years later, he would claim the 1983 Trans-Am Series championship as well. He also made two NASCAR Winston Cup starts in 1976, including leading two laps at the 1976 Daytona 500 and drove a race in the 1979 International Race of Champions.

== Television commentator ==
Hobbs provided commentary for Formula One and GP2 races (alongside Bob Varsha and former Benetton mechanic Steve Matchett) until 2013, the SCCA Valvoline runoffs, and parts of the 24 Hours of Daytona. He has also worked for CBS on its Daytona 500 coverage, working as both a colour commentator and a feature/pit reporter from 1979 until 1996, and then moved to Speed in 1996, working as a colour commentator and then moved to NBCSN in 2013. He also worked for ESPN, serving as an analyst for their Formula 1 coverage from 1988 until 1992 working with Chris Economaki, John Bisignano and Bob Varsha.

== Other appearances ==
Hobbs appeared in the 1983 comedy film Stroker Ace, playing a TV race announcer. He also appeared in the Cars 2 movie, which premiered in June 2011, as announcer "David Hobbscap", a 1963 Jaguar from Hobbs' real life hometown in England.

== Personal life ==
Hobbs's father, Howard Frederick Hobbs (21/9/1902 – 15/12/1982), was an Australian engineer born and raised in Adelaide. He was an inventor who developed an early version of the automatic transmission, known as the Mecha-Matic. Colin Chapman had this transmission fitted to his Lotus Elite racecars.

Howard Hobbs married Phyllis Dorothy Reid (25/3/1904 – 1989) on 12 May 1925 and the couple had three children. Barbara, born in Adelaide on 5 May, 1927, and sons John (b. 1 July 1933) and David (b. 9 June 1939), both boys being born in Lemington Spa after the young Hobbs family had sailed for England in 1931 with the intent on Howard showing his transmission to automotive engineers in Coventry, settling in Royal Lemington Spa where they would remain for approximately the next 35 years.

Hobbs lives in Vero Beach, Florida with his wife, Margaret, with whom he has two sons, Gregory and Guy. In 1986, Hobbs opened a car dealership, David Hobbs Honda, in Glendale, Wisconsin, which was sold to the Van Horn Automotive Group in March 2023. His youngest son, Guy, worked for Speed as a pit reporter on their sports car coverage. He is the grandfather of current racing driver Andrew Hobbs.

== Racing record ==
=== Complete Formula One World Championship results ===
(key)

| Year | Entrant | Chassis | Engine | 1 | 2 | 3 | 4 | 5 | 6 | 7 | 8 | 9 | 10 | 11 | 12 | 13 | 14 | 15 | WDC | Pts |
|---|---|---|---|---|---|---|---|---|---|---|---|---|---|---|---|---|---|---|---|---|
| 1967 | Bernard White Racing | BRM P261 | BRM P60 2.1 V8 | RSA | MON | NED | BEL | FRA | GBR; 8 | | CAN; 9 | ITA | USA | MEX | | | | | NC | 0 |
| 1967 | Lola Cars | Lola T100 | BMW M10 2.0 L4 | | | | | | | GER; 10^{1} | | | | | | | | | NC | 0 |
| 1968 | Honda Racing F1 | Honda RA301 | Honda RA301E 3.0 V12 | RSA | ESP | MON | BEL | NED | FRA | GBR | GER | ITA; Ret | CAN | USA | MEX | | | | NC | 0 |
| 1971 | Penske-White Racing | McLaren M19A | Ford Cosworth DFV 3.0 V8 | RSA | ESP | MON | NED | FRA | GBR | GER | AUT | ITA | CAN | USA; 10 | | | | | NC | 0 |
| 1974 | Yardley Team McLaren | McLaren M23B | Ford Cosworth DFV 3.0 V8 | ARG | BRA | RSA | ESP | BEL | MON | SWE | NED | FRA | GBR | GER | AUT; 7 | ITA; 9 | CAN | USA | NC | 0 |

Notes

- **^1** – Formula 2 entry.

=== Non-championship Formula One results ===
(key)

| Year | Entrant | Chassis | Engine | 1 | 2 | 3 | 4 | 5 | 6 | 7 | 8 |
|---|---|---|---|---|---|---|---|---|---|---|---|
| 1964 | Merlyn Racing | Merlyn Mk7 (F2) | Ford Cosworth SCA 1.0 L4 | DMT | NWT | SYR | AIN; Ret | INT | SOL | MED | RAN |
| 1966 | Reg Parnell Racing | Lotus 33 | BRM P60 2.0 V8 | RSA | SYR; 3 | INT | OUL | | | | |
| 1968 | Bernard White Racing | BRM P261 | BRM P101 3.0 V12 | ROC; 9 | INT; 6 | OUL; 6 | | | | | |
| 1970 | Team Surtees | Surtees TS5 (F5000) | Chevrolet 5.0 V8 | ROC | INT; Ret | OUL | | | | | |
| 1971 | Hogan Racing | McLaren M10B (F5000) | Chevrolet 5.0 V8 | ARG | ROC | QUE; DNQ | SPR | INT | RIN | OUL | VIC |
| 1973 | Hogan Racing | Lola T330 (F5000) | Chevrolet 5.0 V8 | ROC; Ret | INT; Ret | | | | | | |
| 1974 | Hogan Racing | Lola T332 (F5000) | Chevrolet 5.0 V8 | PRE | ROC | INT; DNS | | | | | |

=== Complete British Saloon Car Championship results ===
(key) (Races in bold indicate pole position; races in italics indicate fastest lap.)

| Year | Team | Car | Class | 1 | 2 | 3 | 4 | 5 | 6 | 7 | 8 | 9 | 10 | 11 | 12 | Pos. | Pts | Class |
|---|---|---|---|---|---|---|---|---|---|---|---|---|---|---|---|---|---|---|
| 1962 | Peter Berry Racing Ltd | Jaguar Mk II 3.8 | D | SNE ovr:? cls:6 | GOO ovr:4 cls:4 | AIN ovr:3 cls:3 | SIL ovr:4 cls:4 | CRY | AIN | BRH ovr:5 cls:5 | OUL | | | | | 18th | 8 | 6th |
| 1968 | Malcolm Gartlan Racing | Ford Falcon Sprint | D | BRH ovr:4 cls:2 | **THR** ovr:2 cls:2 | SIL; Ret | CRY; Ret† | MAL | BRH | SIL ovr:1 cls:1 | CRO ovr:2 cls:2 | OUL ovr:3 cls:3 | BRH | BRH ovr:2 cls:1 | | 9th | 32 | **3rd** |
| 1970 | Pierre de Plessis | Chevrolet Camaro Z28 | D | BRH | SNE | THR | SIL; Ret | CRY | SIL | SIL | CRO | BRH | OUL | BRH | BRH | NC | 0 | NC |

† Events with 2 races staged for the different classes.

=== Complete 24 Hours of Le Mans results ===
| Year | Team | Co-drivers | Car | Class | Laps | Pos. | Class pos. |
|---|---|---|---|---|---|---|---|
| 1962 | (United Kingdom) Team Lotus Engineering | (Australia) Frank Gardner | Lotus Elite Mk14-Climax | GT; 1.3 | 286 | 8th | **1st** |
| 1963 | (United Kingdom) Lola Cars Ltd. | (United Kingdom) Richard Attwood | Lola Mk6 GT-Ford | P +3.0 | 151 | DNF | DNF |
| 1964 | (United Kingdom) Standard Triumph | (Netherlands) Rob Slotemaker | Triumph Spitfire | P +3.0 | 272 | 21st | **3rd** |
| 1965 | (United Kingdom) Standard Triumph Ltd. | (Netherlands) Rob Slotemaker | Triumph Spitfire | GT; 1.3 | 71 | DNF | DNF |
| 1966 | (United Kingdom) Maranello Concessionaires | (United Kingdom) Mike Salmon | Ferrari Dino 206S | P 2.0 | 14 | DNF | DNF |
| 1967 | (United Kingdom) Lola Cars Ltd. (United Kingdom) Team Surtees | (United Kingdom) John Surtees | Lola T70 Mk.III-Aston Martin | P +5.0 | 3 | DNF | DNF |
| 1968 | (United Kingdom) J.W. Automotive Engineering Ltd. | (Australia) Paul Hawkins | Ford GT40 Mk. I | S 5.0 | 107 | DNF | DNF |
| 1969 | (United Kingdom) J.W. Automotive Engineering Ltd. | (United Kingdom) Mike Hailwood | Ford GT40 Mk. I | S 5.0 | 368 | **3rd** | **2nd** |
| 1970 | (United Kingdom) J.W. Automotive Engineering Ltd. | (United Kingdom) Mike Hailwood | Porsche 917K | S 5.0 | 49 | DNF | DNF |
| 1971 | (United States) Roger Penske (United States) Kirk F. White | (United States) Mark Donohue | Ferrari 512M/P | S 5.0 | | DNF | DNF |
| 1972 | (France) Equipe Matra-Simca Shell | (France) Jean-Pierre Jabouille | Matra-Simca MS660C | S 3.0 | 278 | DNF | DNF |
| 1979 | (United States) Grand Touring Cars Ltd. Ford Concessionaires France | (Australia) Vern Schuppan (France) Jean-Pierre Jaussaud | Mirage M10-Ford Cosworth | S +2.0 | 121 | NC | NC |
| 1981 | (United Kingdom) EMKA Productions Limited | (Republic of Ireland) Eddie Jordan (United Kingdom) Steve O'Rourke | BMW M1 Gr.5 | Gr.5 | 236 | DNF | DNF |
| 1982 | (United Kingdom) John Fitzpatrick Racing | (United Kingdom) John Fitzpatrick | Porsche 935/78 Moby Dick | IMSA; GTX | 329 | 4th | **1st** |
| 1983 | (United Kingdom) John Fitzpatrick Racing | (United Kingdom) John Fitzpatrick (Austria) Dieter Quester | Porsche 956 | C | 135 | DNF | DNF |
| 1984 | (United Kingdom) Skoal Bandit Porsche Team | (France) Philippe Streiff (South Africa) Sarel van der Merwe | Porsche 956B | C1 | 351 | **3rd** | **3rd** |
| 1985 | (United Kingdom) John Fitzpatrick Racing | (Austria) Jo Gartner (United Kingdom) Guy Edwards | Porsche 956B | C1 | 366 | 4th | 4th |
| 1987 | (Germany) Joest Racing | (South Africa) Sarel van der Merwe (United States) Chip Robinson | Porsche 962C | C1 | 4 | DNF | DNF |
| 1988 | (Germany) Blaupunkt Joest Racing | (Belgium) Didier Theys (Austria) Franz Konrad | Porsche 962C | C1 | 380 | 5th | 5th |
| 1989 | (United Kingdom) Richard Lloyd Racing | (Sweden) Steven Andskär (United Kingdom) Damon Hill | Porsche 962C GTi | C1 | 228 | DNF | DNF |

=== Indianapolis 500 results ===
| Year | Car | Start | Qual | Rank | Finish | Laps | Led | Retired |
|---|---|---|---|---|---|---|---|---|
| 1971 | 68 | 16 | 169.571 | 30 | 20 | 107 | 0 | Crash FS |
| 1973 | 73 | 22 | 189.454 | 30 | 11 | 107 | 0 | Flagged |
| 1974 | 73 | 9 | 184.833 | 10 | 5 | 196 | 0 | Flagged |
| 1976 | 33 | 31 | 183.580 | 14 | 29 | 10 | 0 | Water Leak |
| **Totals** | | | | | | 420 | 0 | |

| Starts | 4 |
| Poles | 0 |
| Front row | 0 |
| Wins | 0 |
| Top 5 | 1 |
| Top 10 | 1 |
| Retired | 2 |

=== NASCAR ===
(key) (Bold - Pole position awarded by qualifying time. Italics - Pole position earned by points standings or practice time. * – Most laps led.)

==== Winston Cup Series ====
NASCAR Winston Cup Series results
| Year | Team | No. | Make | 1 | 2 | 3 | 4 | 5 | 6 | 7 | 8 | 9 | 10 | 11 | 12 | 13 | 14 | 15 | 16 | 17 | 18 | 19 | 20 | 21 | 22 | 23 | 24 | 25 | 26 | 27 | 28 | 29 | 30 | NWCC | Pts | Ref |
|---|---|---|---|---|---|---|---|---|---|---|---|---|---|---|---|---|---|---|---|---|---|---|---|---|---|---|---|---|---|---|---|---|---|---|---|---|
| 1976 | DeWitt Racing | 73 | Chevy | RSD | DAY; 34 | CAR | RCH | BRI | ATL | NWS | DAR | MAR | TAL | NSV | DOV | CLT | RSD | MCH | DAY | NSV | POC | TAL | | | | | | | | | | | | NA | 0 | |
| 1976 | Donlavey Racing | 9 | Ford | | | | | | | | | | | | | | | | | | | | MCH; 17 | BRI | DAR | RCH | DOV | MAR | NWS | CLT | CAR | ATL | ONT | NA | 0 | |

===== Daytona 500 =====
| Year | Team | Manufacturer | Start | Finish |
|---|---|---|---|---|
| 1976 | DeWitt Racing | Chevrolet | 16 | 34 |

=== Complete Bathurst 1000 results ===
| Year | Team | Co-drivers | Car | Class | Laps | Pos. | Class pos. |
|---|---|---|---|---|---|---|---|
| 1981 | (Australia) JPS Team BMW | (Australia) Allan Grice | BMW 635 CSi | 6 Cylinder & Rotary | 113 | 7th | **2nd** |
| 1982 | (Australia) JPS Team BMW | (New Zealand) Jim Richards | BMW 635 CSi | A | 157 | 5th | 5th |

Sporting positions
| Preceded by John Cannon | US Formula A/F5000; Champion; 1971 | Succeeded by Graham McRae |
