= Cooper T86 =

Formula One race car

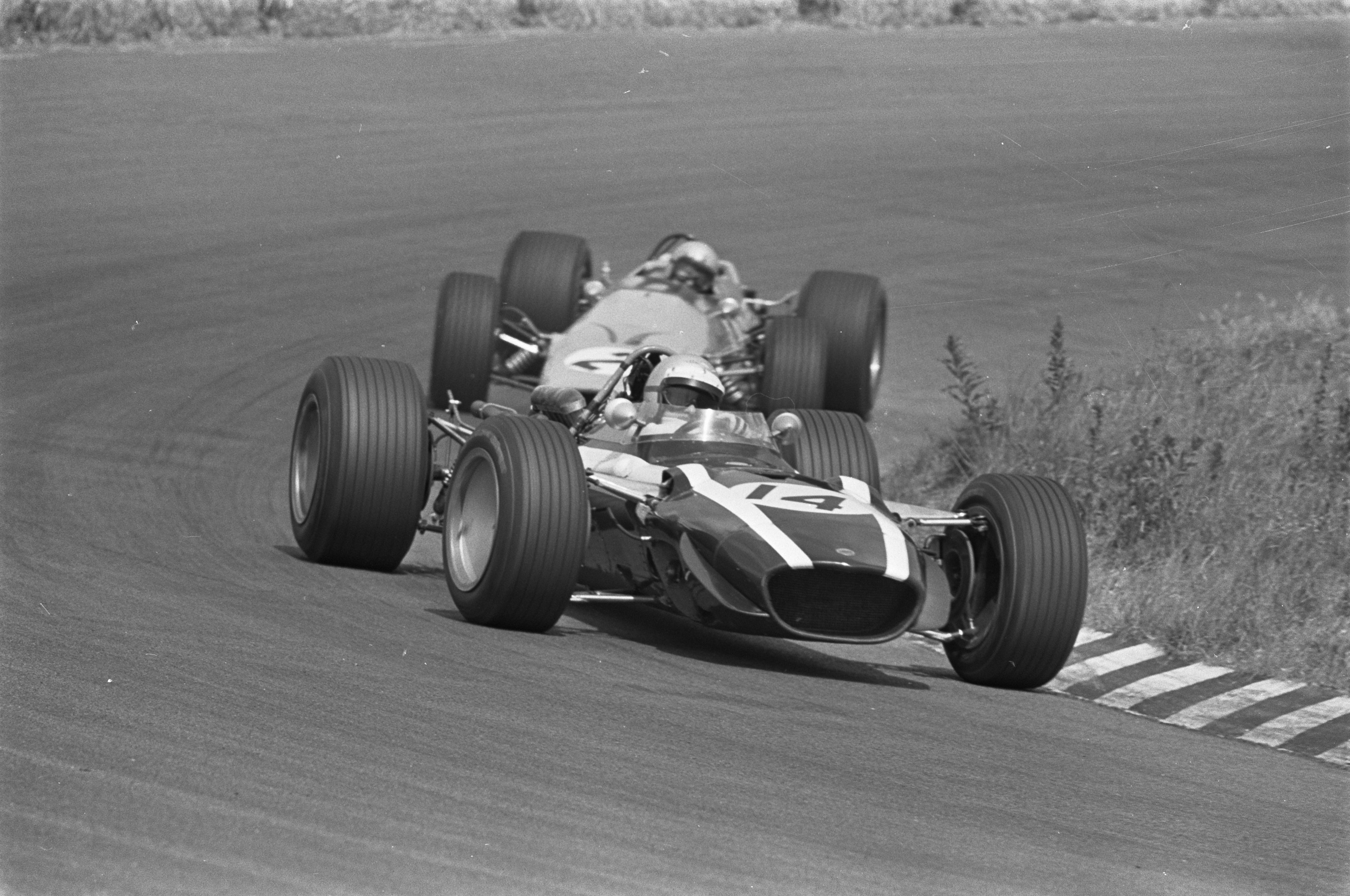
- Category: Formula One
- Constructor: Cooper Car Company
- Designer: Derrick White
- Predecessor: Cooper T81B

Technical specifications
- Chassis: Elektron monocoque
- Suspension (front): Double wishbone, with inboard spring/damper units
- Suspension (rear): Double wishbone, with outboard coilover spring/damper units
- Axle track: 62 in (1,575 mm)
- Wheelbase: 98 in (2,489 mm)
- Engine: 1967-1969: Maserati 10/F1 2,983 cc (182.0 cu in) V12 naturally aspirated mid-mounted 1968: BRM P142 2,998 cc (182.9 cu in) V12 naturally aspirated mid-mounted 1968: Alfa Romeo T33 2,998 cc (182.9 cu in) V8 naturally aspirated mid-mounted
- Transmission: Hewland 5-speed manual
- Weight: 1,235 lb (560.2 kg)
- Fuel: BP
- Tyres: Firestone, Goodyear

Competition history
- Notable entrants: Cooper Car Company
- Notable drivers: (Austria) Jochen Rindt (Belgium) Jacky Ickx (Italy) Ludovico Scarfiotti (United Kingdom) Brian Redman (United Kingdom) Vic Elford
- Debut: 1967 British Grand Prix
Races	Wins	Poles	F/Laps
18	0	0	0
- Constructors' Championships: 0
- Drivers' Championships: 0
- Unless otherwise stated, all data refer to Formula One World Championship Grands Prix only.

The Cooper T86 was a Formula One racing car built by Cooper and first raced in 1967. B and C specification cars were also built to accommodate different engines, but the car could not revive Cooper's fortunes and this type represents the last Formula One chassis built and raced by the former champion team.

== T86 ==
The Cooper T81 had proved rather successful when it first appeared in 1966 but by mid-1967 it had slipped behind the newer cars of the leading teams. The new T86 car was built for Cooper's lead driver Jochen Rindt to use, starting with the British Grand Prix, a narrower, lower and lighter car fabricated from Elektron alloys with a bump around the gear lever to give the driver more space while changing gear, a feature that became a common sight on single-seater cars well into the 1970s. The new chassis was some 112 lb lighter than the T81, but was still overweight due to its Maserati V12, an engine whose first incarnation had raced in Formula One in 2.5-litre form some ten years earlier. It was found that the car had a tendency to get light at the front at high speeds, but ahead of the Italian Grand Prix this was fixed by the mounting of a small spoiler on the nose, another innovative feature. Jacky Ickx drove the car at Watkins Glen, and former Grand Prix winner Ludovico Scarfiotti gave the car its last outing for the works team in the first race of 1968.

The car wasn't used for the remainder of 1968, and by 1969 it had been acquired by Colin Crabbe, who got Vic Elford in to drive the car for his appropriately named Antique Automobiles racing team in the International Trophy. Neil Corner drove the car at the non-championship Madrid Grand Prix but Elford came back for the Monaco Grand Prix where the car qualified last and finished last of those still running, 6 laps down in 7th place. It was to be the last time a Cooper was raced in a championship Grand Prix as Crabbe acquired the McLaren M7B for Elford to drive in later races.

== T86B ==
For the 1968 season a 'B' specification T86 was produced to incorporate the BRM V12 which replaced the ageing Maserati unit and made its debut at the second race of the season in Spain. Two cars were initially constructed, a third being built after Redman's crash at Spa, and these were used exclusively by the Cooper works team during the 1968 Formula One season. Cooper's version of the BRM V12 was a less powerful "sportscar" version of the engine, which was already one of the heaviest on the grid, but after finishing third and fourth (thanks to the unreliability of others) in both Spain and Monaco the car gradually slipped down the grid towards the season's end. The Mexican Grand Prix would be the last Formula One race for a works Cooper car, as the Cooper team decided it could not continue to compete in Formula One with no sponsorship money available for 1969 and auctioned off the two T86B chassis still in its possession. The first T86B was acquired by Martin Brain who drove the car with some success in British hillclimb and club races, but in a Formula Libre race at Silverstone in 1970 Brain left the track and flipped the car, and was killed.

== T86C ==
The third T86 built in 1968 was a special 'C' specification car made for a 3.0-litre Alfa Romeo V8 engine as used in the Tipo 33 sportscar, with an eye to Cooper using the Alfa engine in future instead of the BRM. Lucien Bianchi was entered in the car at Brands Hatch and Monza but did not take part in either meeting, Alfa Romeo withdrawing their support when it became clear in testing that the V8 was badly underpowered, with subsequent developments failing on the test bench. Alfa Romeo did eventually enter F1 with the V8 with McLaren in 1970 and March in 1971. The chassis was later converted to F5000 spec with a 5-litre Ford V8 and entered in 11 events in the 1970 Guards European Formula 5000 Championship driven by Fred Place but was not very successful. The following year the car missed the F5000 season as it had been stolen along with a spare engine, but the chassis was later recovered. The car has since been restored to its original form with a similar Alfa Romeo V8 to its intended powerplant, and appears regularly in historic racing.

== Complete Formula One World Championship results ==
Year	Entrant	Chassis	Engine	Tyres	Driver	1	2	3	4	5	6	7	8	9	10	11	12	Points	WCC
1967	Cooper Car Company	T86	Maserati 10/F1 3.0 V12	F		RSA	MON	NED	BEL	FRA	GBR	GER	CAN	ITA	USA	MEX		28^{1}	3rd^{1}
1967	Cooper Car Company	T86	Maserati 10/F1 3.0 V12	F	Jochen Rindt						Ret	Ret		4				28^{1}	3rd^{1}
1967	Cooper Car Company	T86	Maserati 10/F1 3.0 V12	F	Jacky Ickx										Ret			28^{1}	3rd^{1}
1968	Cooper Car Company	T86	Maserati 10/F1 3.0 V12	F		RSA	ESP	MON	BEL	NED	FRA	GBR	GER	ITA	CAN	USA	MEX	0	-
1968	Cooper Car Company	T86	Maserati 10/F1 3.0 V12	F	Ludovico Scarfiotti	Ret												0	-
1968	Tom Jones	T86	Maserati 10/F1 3.0 V12	F	Tom Jones							DNA						0	-
1968	Cooper Car Company	T86B	BRM P101 3.0 V12	F	Ludovico Scarfiotti		4	4										14	7th
1968	Cooper Car Company	T86B	BRM P101 3.0 V12	F	Brian Redman		3		Ret									14	7th
1968	Cooper Car Company	T86B	BRM P101 3.0 V12	F	Vic Elford						4	Ret	Ret	Ret	5	Ret	8	14	7th
1968	Cooper Car Company	T86B	BRM P101 3.0 V12	F	Johnny Servoz-Gavin						Ret							14	7th
1968	Cooper Car Company	T86B	BRM P101 3.0 V12	F	Robin Widdows							Ret		DNA				14	7th
1968	Cooper Car Company	T86B	BRM P101 3.0 V12	F	Lucien Bianchi			3	6	Ret			Ret		NC	NC	Ret	14	7th
1968	Cooper Car Company	T86C	Alfa Romeo T33 3.0 V8	F	Lucien Bianchi							DNA		DNA				0	-
1969	Colin Crabbe Antique Automobiles	T86	Maserati 10/F1 3.0 V12	G		RSA	ESP	MON	NED	FRA	GBR	GER	ITA	CAN	USA	MEX		0	-
1969	Colin Crabbe Antique Automobiles	T86	Maserati 10/F1 3.0 V12	G	Vic Elford			7										0	-
1969	Falken Racing	T86	Maserati 10/F1 3.0 V12	G	Tony Lanfranchi									DNA				0	-

^1 Includes points scored by the Cooper T81 and Cooper T81B entries
