= Lotus 33 =

Formula One racing car

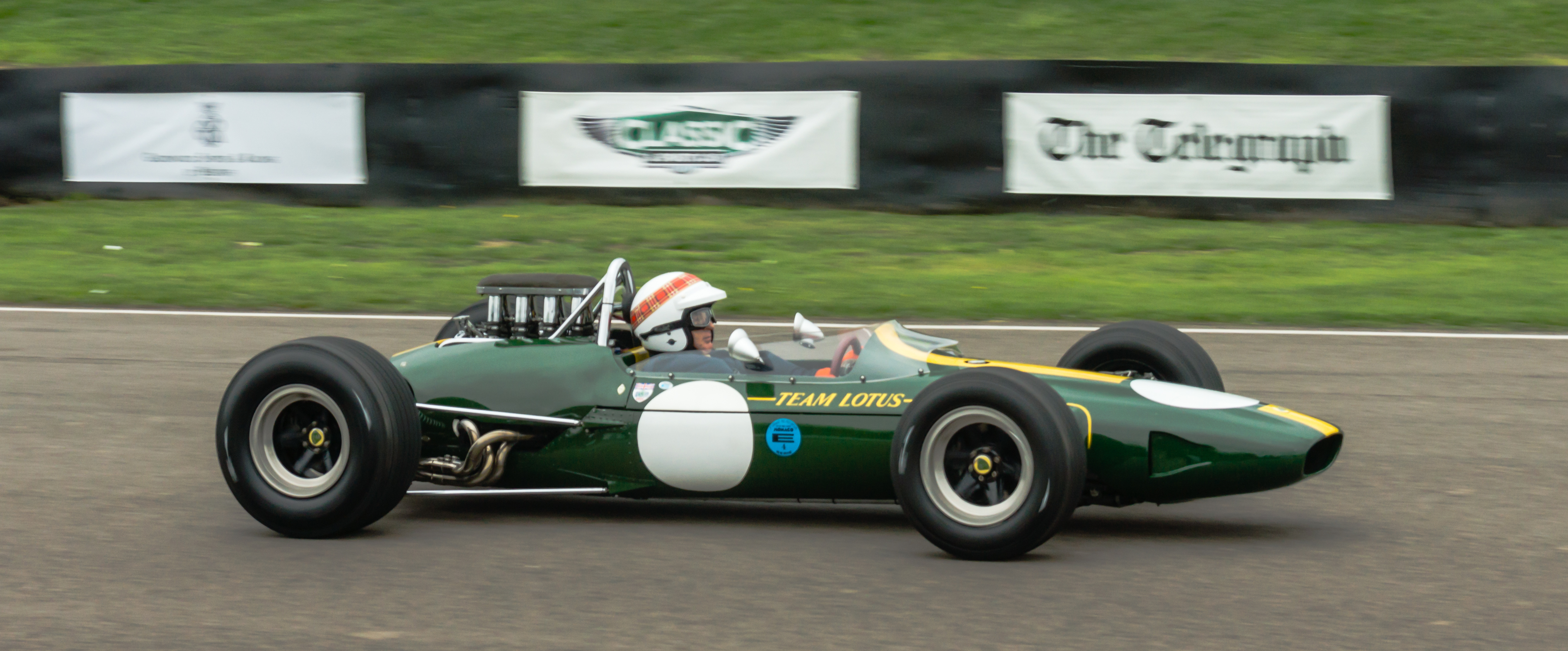
- Jackie Stewart driving a Lotus 33 in 2013
- Category: Formula One
- Constructor: Team Lotus
- Designers: Colin Chapman; Len Terry
- Predecessor: Lotus 25
- Successor: Lotus 43

Technical specifications
- Chassis: Aluminium monocoque
- Suspension (front): Upper cantilever rocker arms and lower wishbones, with inboard mounted Armstrong coilover spring/dampers
- Suspension (rear): Upper transverse links and twin radius rods with reversed lower wishbone. Armstrong outboard coilover spring/dampers.
- Engine: Coventry Climax FWMV 1,497 cc (91 cu in), or; BRM P56 1,498 cc (91 cu in), or; BRM P60 1,909 cc (116 cu in); V8 Naturally aspirated mid-mounted
- Transmission: ZF 5-speed manual
- Tyres: Dunlop

Competition history
- Notable entrants: Team Lotus; Reg Parnell Racing; DW Racing Enterprises
- Notable drivers: (United Kingdom) Jim Clark; (New Zealand) Mike Spence; (United States) Walt Hansgen; (Mexico) Pedro Rodríguez; (United Kingdom) Peter Arundell; (United Kingdom) Graham Hill
- Debut: 1964 Aintree 200, Aintree.
Races	Wins	Podiums	Poles	F/Laps
27	5	8	10	8
- Constructors' Championships: 1 (1965)
- Drivers' Championships: 1 (Jim Clark, 1965)

The Lotus 33 was a Formula One car designed by Colin Chapman and Len Terry and built by Team Lotus. A development of the successful Lotus 25, in the hands of Jim Clark it won five World Championship Grands Prix in 1965, taking Clark to his second World Championship.

== Concept ==
The Lotus 33's development was based on the earlier Lotus 25 model, taking the monocoque chassis design to new development heights. The 33 was again powered by the 1500 cc Climax engine. The 33 was almost identical to the 25, but had suspension designed around newer, wider tyres. The car was more rigid and was simpler to build than its predecessor.

Six Lotus 33s were constructed, with chassis numbers following on from the 25 and beginning with R8. One chassis, R12, was modified to take the stillborn Climax FWMW flat-16 engine; this car was designated the Lotus 39. Chassis number R13 was not used by Team Lotus but was later unofficially adopted by Reg Parnell Racing for their crashed chassis R4, rebuilt around a 33 chassis. The last of the series, R14, was built with a 2-litre version of the Climax V8 for the 1966 World Championship season, pending the arrival of the Lotus 43.

== Racing history ==
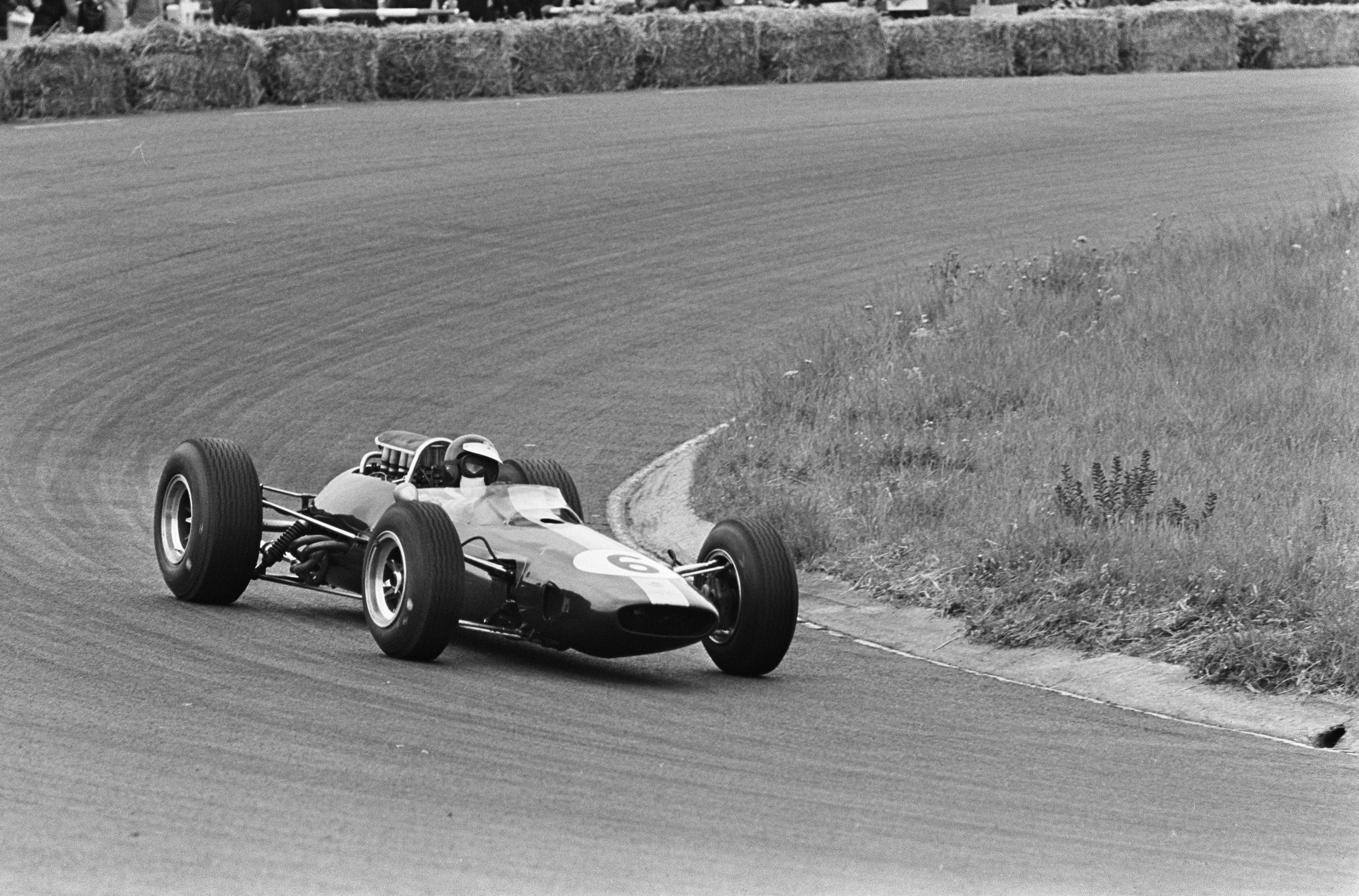
Jim Clark at the 1965 Dutch Grand Prix.

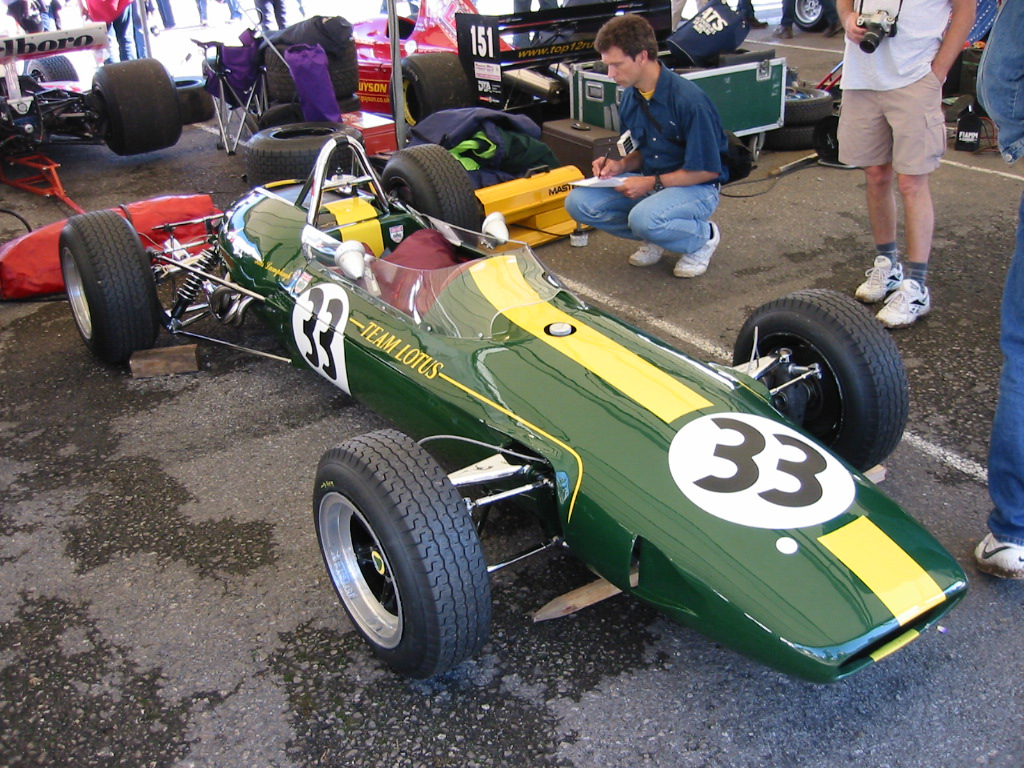
A Lotus 33 on display at the 2015 Goodwood Festival of Speed

Introduced for the 1964 season, the 33 made its first appearance at the non-Championship Aintree 200. Clark qualified fourth, and set fastest lap before retiring. The 33's first World Championship event was the German Grand Prix. However, both Clark and his team mate Mike Spence struggled with the car and it was not until the following year that it came good. Clark won the first event of 1965, the South African Grand Prix and went on to take four more wins on the way to his second world championship. Clark missed the Monaco Grand Prix (a race which he would never win) to race in the Indianapolis 500, which he won.

In 1965 a four-valve version of the Climax engine was used which had an increase in power (about 210 bhp (157 kW) - 220 bhp (164 kW) compared to the older Climaxes which gave about 200 bhp). However the extra power sacrificed reliability, and Clark retired from the final 3 races of 1965 after he'd wrapped up the title. The 33 was pressed into service with bored out 2 litre Climax V8 and BRM V8 engines for the early races of 1966, until the 3 litre Lotus 43 was ready. In 1967, with the new Lotus 49 still suffering teething trouble, the 33s were deemed more suitable for the tight turns of Monte Carlo. Clark set fastest lap but retired his Climax-engined 33 while Hill drove the BRM-engined car to second place.

The 33 was also campaigned in 1965 by DW Racing Enterprises for Paul Hawkins, and in 1965 and 1966 by Reg Parnell Racing, however their car was actually a crashed 25 rebuilt as a 33, with a BRM engine. The 33's final World Championship race was the 1967 Canadian Grand Prix, where privateer Mike Fisher finished in 11th place. Fisher also qualified the car for that year's Mexican Grand Prix, but engine problems prevented him from starting the race.

The 33 also met with success outside of the World Championship with Jim Clark and Mike Spence each winning two non-Championship events, and Clark winning the 1967 Tasman Series.

== PC simulation ==
A driveable, detailed virtual recreation of the Lotus 33 is available in the '1965 F1 Mod' add-on for the Grand Prix Legends PC-based F1 racing simulation.

It is also available in the 'Grand Prix Legends 1967' mod for PC-based racing simulation Assetto Corsa, as well as for rFactor in the 1965 F1 mod.

== Formula One World Championship results ==
(key) (results in bold indicate pole position; results in italics indicate fastest lap)

Year	Entrant	Engine	Driver	1	2	3	4	5	6	7	8	9	10	11	Points^{1}	WCC
1964	Team Lotus	Climax FWMV 1.5 V8		MON	NED	BEL	FRA	GBR	GER	AUT	ITA	USA	MEX		37 (40)^{2}	3rd
1964	Team Lotus	Climax FWMV 1.5 V8	Jim Clark						Ret	Ret		**7**	**5**		37 (40)^{2}	3rd
1964	Team Lotus	Climax FWMV 1.5 V8	Mike Spence						8	Ret	6	7			37 (40)^{2}	3rd
1964	Team Lotus	Climax FWMV 1.5 V8	Walt Hansgen									5			37 (40)^{2}	3rd
1964	Team Lotus	Climax FWMV 1.5 V8	Moises Solana										10		37 (40)^{2}	3rd
1965	Team Lotus	Climax FWMV 1.5 V8		RSA	MON	BEL	FRA	GBR	NED	GER	ITA	USA	MEX		54 (58)^{2}	1st
1965	Team Lotus	Climax FWMV 1.5 V8	Jim Clark	**1**		**1**		**1**	1	**1**	**10**	Ret	**Ret**		54 (58)^{2}	1st
1965	Team Lotus	Climax FWMV 1.5 V8	Mike Spence	4	DNA	7	7	4		Ret	11	Ret	3		54 (58)^{2}	1st
1965	DW Racing Enterprises	Climax FWMV 1.5 V8	Paul Hawkins		10	DNA		DNA		Ret					54 (58)^{2}	1st
1965	Reg Parnell Racing	BRM P56 1.5 V8	Innes Ireland								9	Ret	DNS		2	8th
1965	Reg Parnell Racing	BRM P56 1.5 V8	Bob Bondurant										Ret		2	8th
1966	Team Lotus	Climax FWMV 2.0 V8		MON	BEL	FRA	GBR	NED	GER	ITA	USA	MEX			8	6th
1966	Team Lotus	Climax FWMV 2.0 V8	Jim Clark	**Ret**	Ret	DNS	4	3	**Ret**						8	6th
1966	Team Lotus	Climax FWMV 2.0 V8	Pedro Rodríguez			Ret						Ret			8	6th
1966	Team Lotus	Climax FWMV 2.0 V8	Geki							9					8	6th
1966	Team Lotus	Climax FWMV 2.0 V8	Peter Arundell								6				8	6th
1966	Team Lotus	BRM P60 2.0 V8	Peter Arundell				Ret	Ret	12	8		7			13^{3}	5th
1966	Team Lotus	BRM P60 2.0 V8	Pedro Rodríguez								Ret				13^{3}	5th
1966	Reg Parnell Racing	BRM P60 2.0 V8	Mike Spence	Ret	Ret	Ret	Ret	5	Ret	5	Ret	DNS			13^{3}	5th
1967	Team Lotus	Climax FWMV 2.0 V8		RSA	MON	NED	BEL	FRA	GBR	GER	CAN	ITA	USA	MEX	0	NC
1967	Team Lotus	Climax FWMV 2.0 V8	Jim Clark		Ret										0	NC
1967	Team Lotus	BRM P60 2.1 V8	Graham Hill		2										6	8th
1967	Mike Fisher	BRM P60 2.1 V8	Mike Fisher								11			DNS	6	8th

^{1} Points were awarded on a 9-6-4-3-2-1 basis to the first six finishers at each round, but only the best placed car for each make was eligible to score points. In 1964 and 1965 only the best six results from the season were retained, and only the best five results for 1966. In 1967 the best five results from the first six rounds and the best four results from the last five rounds were retained.
^{2} Total points scored by all Lotus-Climax cars, including Lotus 25 variants.
^{3} Total points scored by all Lotus-BRM cars, including Lotus 43 variants.

== Non-Championship Formula One results ==
(key) (results in bold indicate pole position; results in italics indicate fastest lap)

Year	Entrant	Engine	Tyres	Drivers	1	2	3	4	5	6	7	8
1964	Team Lotus	Climax FWMV 1.5 V8	D		DMT	NWT	SYR	AIN	INT	SOL	MED	RAN
1964	Team Lotus	Climax FWMV 1.5 V8	D	Jim Clark				Ret		**1**		
1964	Team Lotus	Climax FWMV 1.5 V8	D	Mike Spence								16
1964	Team Lotus	Climax FWMV 1.5 V8	D	Jackie Stewart								**17**
1965	Team Lotus	Climax FWMV 1.5 V8	D		ROC	SYR	SMT	INT	MED	RAN		
1965	Team Lotus	Climax FWMV 1.5 V8	D	Jim Clark	**Ret**	**1**						
1965	Team Lotus	Climax FWMV 1.5 V8	D	Mike Spence	1	Ret	DNS	3	Ret			
1965	DW Racing Enterprises	Climax FWMV 1.5 V8	D	Paul Hawkins	NC	DNA	Ret	10	DNA			
1965	Reg Parnell Racing	BRM P60 2.0 V8	D	Innes Ireland						6		
1966	Team Lotus	Climax FWMV 2.0 V8	F		RSA	SYR	INT	OUL				
1966	Team Lotus	Climax FWMV 2.0 V8	F	Mike Spence	1							
1966	Team Lotus	Climax FWMV 2.0 V8	F	Peter Arundell	3			DNS				
1966	Team Lotus	Climax FWMV 2.0 V8	F	Jim Clark				3				
1966	Reg Parnell Racing	BRM P60 2.0 V8	F	Innes Ireland	Ret							
1966	Reg Parnell Racing	BRM P60 2.0 V8	F	David Hobbs		3						
1966	Reg Parnell Racing	BRM P60 2.0 V8	F	Mike Spence			Ret					
1967	Team Lotus	BRM P60 2.1 V8	F		ROC	SPC	INT	SYR	OUL	ESP		
1967	Team Lotus	BRM P60 2.1 V8	F	Graham Hill			4					

== Bibliography ==
- Tipler, John (2001). Lotus 25 & 33. Sutton Publishing Ltd. ISBN 0-7509-2594-9.
