= Reg Parnell Racing =

1959–1969 Formula One team

- Full name: Reg Parnell Racing
- Base: Hounslow, London, England
- Founder(s): Reg Parnell
- Noted staff: Reg Parnell; Tim Parnell
- Noted drivers: (New Zealand) Chris Amon (United Kingdom) Mike Hailwood (United States) Phil Hill (United Kingdom) John Surtees (United Kingdom) Richard Attwood (United Kingdom) Mike Spence (United Kingdom) Piers Courage (United Kingdom) Chris Irwin (United Kingdom) Roy Salvadori

Formula One World Championship career
- First entry: 1959 British Grand Prix
- Races entered: 81
- Constructors: Cooper; Lola; Lotus; Ferrari; BRM
- Race victories: 0
- Pole positions: 1
- Fastest laps: 0
- Final entry: 1969 Monaco Grand Prix

Reg Parnell Racing was a privateer Formula One team during the 1950s and 1960s. The team was founded by ex-Formula One driver Reg Parnell after he retired from racing. It raced as Yeoman Credit Racing in 1961 and as the Bowmaker Racing Team in 1962. The team's best results were a pair of second places in the British Grand Prix and the German Grand Prix of 1962. John Surtees also took pole for the team at the 1962 Dutch Grand Prix.

== Formula One World Championship results ==
(key) (Results in bold indicate pole position; results in italics indicate fastest lap; † indicates shared drive.)

| Year | Chassis | Engine(s) | Tyres | Drivers | 1 | 2 | 3 | 4 | 5 | 6 | 7 | 8 | 9 | 10 | 11 | 12 |
|---|---|---|---|---|---|---|---|---|---|---|---|---|---|---|---|---|
| 1959 | Cooper T45; Cooper T51 | Climax FPF 1.5 L4 | D | | MON | 500 | NED | FRA | GBR | GER | POR | ITA | USA | | | |
| 1959 | Cooper T45; Cooper T51 | Climax FPF 1.5 L4 | D | (United Kingdom) Henry Taylor | | | | | 11 | | | | | | | |
| 1959 | Cooper T45; Cooper T51 | Climax FPF 1.5 L4 | D | (United Kingdom) Tim Parnell | | | | | DNQ | | | | | | | |
| 1961 | Cooper T53 | Climax FPF 1.5 L4 | D | | MON | NED | BEL | FRA | GBR | GER | ITA | USA | | | | |
| 1961 | Cooper T53 | Climax FPF 1.5 L4 | D | (United Kingdom) John Surtees | 11 | 7 | 5 | Ret | Ret | 5 | Ret | Ret | | | | |
| 1961 | Cooper T53 | Climax FPF 1.5 L4 | D | (United Kingdom) Roy Salvadori | | | | 8 | 6 | 10 | 6 | Ret | | | | |
| 1962 | Lola Mk4 | Climax FWMV 1.5 V8 | D | | NED | MON | BEL | FRA | GBR | GER | ITA | USA | RSA | | | |
| 1962 | Lola Mk4 | Climax FWMV 1.5 V8 | D | (United Kingdom) John Surtees | **Ret** | 4 | 5 | 5 | 2 | 2 | Ret | Ret | Ret | | | |
| 1962 | Lola Mk4 | Climax FWMV 1.5 V8 | D | (United Kingdom) Roy Salvadori | Ret | Ret | | Ret | Ret | Ret | Ret | DNS | Ret | | | |
| 1963 | Lola Mk4A; Lotus 24 | Climax FWMV 1.5 V8; BRM P56 1.5 V8 | D | | MON | BEL | NED | FRA | GBR | GER | ITA | USA | MEX | RSA | | |
| 1963 | Lola Mk4A; Lotus 24 | Climax FWMV 1.5 V8; BRM P56 1.5 V8 | D | (New Zealand) Chris Amon | DNS | Ret | Ret | 7 | 7 | Ret | DNS | | Ret | | | |
| 1963 | Lola Mk4A; Lotus 24 | Climax FWMV 1.5 V8; BRM P56 1.5 V8 | D | (France) Maurice Trintignant | Ret | | | 8 | | | | | | | | |
| 1963 | Lola Mk4A; Lotus 24 | Climax FWMV 1.5 V8; BRM P56 1.5 V8 | D | (Belgium) Lucien Bianchi | | Ret | | | | | | | | | | |
| 1963 | Lola Mk4A; Lotus 24 | Climax FWMV 1.5 V8; BRM P56 1.5 V8 | D | (United States) Masten Gregory | | | | Ret | 11 | | Ret | Ret | Ret | | | |
| 1963 | Lola Mk4A; Lotus 24 | Climax FWMV 1.5 V8; BRM P56 1.5 V8 | D | (United Kingdom) Mike Hailwood | | | | | 8 | | 10 | | | | | |
| 1963 | Lola Mk4A; Lotus 24 | Climax FWMV 1.5 V8; BRM P56 1.5 V8 | D | (United Kingdom) John Campbell-Jones | | | | | 13 | | | | | | | |
| 1963 | Lola Mk4A; Lotus 24 | Climax FWMV 1.5 V8; BRM P56 1.5 V8 | D | (United States) Rodger Ward | | | | | | | | Ret | | | | |
| 1963 | Lola Mk4A; Lotus 24 | Climax FWMV 1.5 V8; BRM P56 1.5 V8 | D | (United States) Hap Sharp | | | | | | | | Ret | 7 | | | |
| 1964 | Lotus 25; Lotus 24 | BRM P56 1.5 V8; Climax FWMV 1.5 V8‡ | D | | MON | NED | BEL | FRA | GBR | GER | AUT | ITA | USA | MEX | | |
| 1964 | Lotus 25; Lotus 24 | BRM P56 1.5 V8; Climax FWMV 1.5 V8‡ | D | (New Zealand) Chris Amon | DNQ | 5 | Ret | 10 | Ret | 11 | Ret | | Ret | 14 | | |
| 1964 | Lotus 25; Lotus 24 | BRM P56 1.5 V8; Climax FWMV 1.5 V8‡ | D | (United Kingdom) Mike Hailwood | 6 | 12 | | 8 | Ret | Ret | 8 | Ret | 8 | 16 | | |
| 1964 | Lotus 25; Lotus 24 | BRM P56 1.5 V8; Climax FWMV 1.5 V8‡ | D | (United States) Peter Revson | | | DSQ | DNS | Ret | | | | | | | |
| 1965 | Lotus 25; Lotus 33 | BRM P56 1.5 V8 | D | | RSA | MON | BEL | FRA | GBR | NED | GER | ITA | USA | MEX | | |
| 1965 | Lotus 25; Lotus 33 | BRM P56 1.5 V8 | D | (South Africa) Tony Maggs | 11 | | | | | | | | | | | |
| 1965 | Lotus 25; Lotus 33 | BRM P56 1.5 V8 | D | (United Kingdom) Richard Attwood | | Ret | 14 | | 13 | 12 | Ret | 6 | 10 | 6 | | |
| 1965 | Lotus 25; Lotus 33 | BRM P56 1.5 V8 | D | (United Kingdom) Mike Hailwood | | Ret | | | | | | | | | | |
| 1965 | Lotus 25; Lotus 33 | BRM P56 1.5 V8 | D | (United Kingdom) Innes Ireland | | | 13 | Ret | Ret | 10 | | 9 | Ret | DNS | | |
| 1965 | Lotus 25; Lotus 33 | BRM P56 1.5 V8 | D | (New Zealand) Chris Amon | | | | Ret | | | Ret | | | | | |
| 1965 | Lotus 25; Lotus 33 | BRM P56 1.5 V8 | D | (United States) Bob Bondurant | | | | | | | | | | Ret | | |
| 1966 | Lotus 33; Ferrari 246 | BRM P60 2.0 V8; Ferrari 228 2.4 V6 | F | | MON | BEL | FRA | GBR | NED | GER | ITA | USA | MEX | | | |
| 1966 | Lotus 33; Ferrari 246 | BRM P60 2.0 V8; Ferrari 228 2.4 V6 | F | (United Kingdom) Mike Spence | Ret | Ret | Ret | Ret | 5 | Ret | 5 | Ret | DNS | | | |
| 1966 | Lotus 33; Ferrari 246 | BRM P60 2.0 V8; Ferrari 228 2.4 V6 | F | (Italy) Giancarlo Baghetti | | | | | | | NC | | | | | |
| 1967 | Lotus 25; BRM P261; BRM P83 | BRM P60 2.1 V8; BRM P75 3.0 H16 | F | | RSA | MON | NED | BEL | FRA | GBR | GER | CAN | ITA | USA | MEX | |
| 1967 | Lotus 25; BRM P261; BRM P83 | BRM P60 2.1 V8; BRM P75 3.0 H16 | F | (United Kingdom) Piers Courage | Ret | Ret | | | | DNS | | | | | | |
| 1967 | Lotus 25; BRM P261; BRM P83 | BRM P60 2.1 V8; BRM P75 3.0 H16 | F | (United Kingdom) Chris Irwin | | | 7 | Ret | 5 | 7 | 7 | Ret | Ret | Ret | Ret | |
| 1968 | BRM P126 | BRM P101 3.0 V12 | G | | RSA | ESP | MON | BEL | NED | FRA | GBR | GER | ITA | CAN | USA | MEX |
| 1968 | BRM P126 | BRM P101 3.0 V12 | G | (United Kingdom) Piers Courage | | Ret | Ret | Ret | Ret | 6 | 8 | 8 | 4 | Ret | Ret | Ret |
| 1969 | BRM P126 | BRM P101 3.0 V12 | G | | RSA | ESP | MON | NED | FRA | GBR | GER | ITA | CAN | USA | MEX | |
| 1969 | BRM P126 | BRM P101 3.0 V12 | G | (Mexico) Pedro Rodríguez | Ret | Ret | Ret | | | | | | | | | |

‡ At the 1964 Austrian Grand Prix Amon used a car borrowed from Team Lotus with Climax V8 engine.
