= Mike Fisher (racing driver) =

American racing driver (born 1943)

- Born: March 13, 1943 (age 83); Hollywood, California, U.S.

Formula One World Championship career
- Nationality: (United States) American
- Active years: 1967
- Team: non-works Lotus
- Entries: 2 (1 start)
- Championships: 0
- Wins: 0
- Podiums: 0
- Career points: 0
- Pole positions: 0
- Fastest laps: 0
- First entry: 1967 Canadian Grand Prix
- Last entry: 1967 Mexican Grand Prix

Michael Jeffry Fisher (born March 13, 1943, in Hollywood, California) is a former racecar driver from the United States. He participated in two Formula One Grands Prix, debuting on August 27, 1967. He scored no championship points.

== Complete Formula One World Championship results ==
(key)

Year	Team	Chassis	Engine	1	2	3	4	5	6	7	8	9	10	11	WDC	Points
1967	Mike Fisher	Lotus 33	BRM	RSA	MON	NED	BEL	FRA	GBR	GER	CAN; 11	ITA	USA	MEX; DNS	NC	0
