= Tom Jones (racing driver) =

American racing driver (1943–2015)

- Born: April 26, 1943; Dallas, Texas, U.S.
- Died: May 29, 2015 (aged 72); Eastlake, Ohio, U.S.

Formula One World Championship career
- Nationality: (United States) American
- Active years: 1967
- Team: privateer Cooper
- Entries: 1 (0 starts)
- Championships: 0
- Wins: 0
- Podiums: 0
- Career points: 0
- Pole positions: 0
- Fastest laps: 0
- First entry: 1967 Canadian Grand Prix

Earl Thomas Jones (April 26, 1943 – May 29, 2015) was an American racing driver, born in Dallas, Texas. He entered his own Cooper T82 in one Formula One race, the 1967 Canadian Grand Prix. After a promising practice performance, he suffered electrical problems during qualifying and only set one very slow lap time. The stewards denied him a place on the grid on the grounds that he was "too slow", even though he had been competitive in practice runs.

Until quite recently, Jones was considered one of Formula One's great obscurities, but it has since emerged that he raced on and off throughout the 1970s in various series before retiring in 1980.

Jones ran a welding and metal fabrication company in Cleveland. He died in Eastlake, Ohio on 29 May 2015. His old Cooper T82 still survives and its current owner competes with it in historic racing series.

== Complete Formula One results ==
(key)

Year	Entrant	Chassis	Engine	1	2	3	4	5	6	7	8	9	10	11	WDC	Points
1967	Tom Jones	Cooper T82	Climax V8	RSA	MON	NED	BEL	FRA	GBR	GER	CAN; DNQ	ITA	USA	MEX	NC	0
