= Moisés Solana =

Mexican racing driver (1935–1969)

- Born: 26 December 1935; Tacubaya, Mexico City, Mexico
- Died: 27 July 1969 (aged 33); Donato Guerra, Mexico

Formula One World Championship career
- Nationality: (Mexico) Mexican
- Active years: 1963–1968
- Team(s): Cooper, Lotus, Non-works BRM
- Entries: 8
- Championships: 0
- Wins: 0
- Podiums: 0
- Career points: 0
- Pole positions: 0
- Fastest laps: 0
- First entry: 1963 Mexican Grand Prix
- Last entry: 1968 Mexican Grand Prix

Moisés Solana Arciniega (26 December 1935 – 27 July 1969) was a Mexican racing driver. He participated in eight Formula One World Championship Grands Prix, debuting on 27 October 1963, and scoring no championship points. He also participated in one non-championship Formula One race. He also took part in Formula Two in 1968 with Team Lotus at the Jarama Circuit near Madrid, Spain. His first racing events were in a 1954 special (the "Solana Sports"), built by Javier Solana. Solana was also a proficient Jai alai player and his racing career was partly funded by this.

From 1960 to 1968 he won the Mexican Formula Libre Championship nine times, winning over 200 times in the 270 races he participated in.

In 1968, Solana tested a Formula Two car for Ferrari. He also drove for Lola and McLaren in the USRRC/Can-Am series between 1966 and 1968, and in March 1968 he won the first point-scoring race of the USRRC Group 7 series in the first international race in Mexico City. He still holds all the records in the Mexican road race categories and those at the Mexican Magdalena Mixhuca circuit.

Solana was the only driver in the history of the Formula One World Championship to start a race in a number 13 car (Divina Galica, in the 1976 British Grand Prix, also attempted a race with the number, but failed to qualify), something he did for BRM on his Formula One debut in the 1963 Mexican Grand Prix until Pastor Maldonado adopted 13 as his permanent number in 2014. Solana was a classified finisher in 11th despite his engine having failed eight laps short of the chequered flag.

On 27 July 1969, Solana was killed in the Hillclimb Valle de Bravo-Bosencheve in Mexico, in a fatal accident after his McLaren went wide in a bend and hit a concrete trimming on the edge of the road, overturning the car which landed on top of him and caught fire. The Solana family is still very active in motor racing and has manufactured handmade sports cars on a mostly one-off basis.

The first chicane at the Autódromo Hermanos Rodríguez in Mexico City (turns 1–3) is known as the Ese Moisés Solana ("the Moisés Solana Esses").

== Complete Formula One World Championship results ==
(key)

Year	Entrant	Chassis	Engine	1	2	3	4	5	6	7	8	9	10	11	12	WDC	Points
1963	Scuderia Centro Sud	BRM P57	BRM V8	MON	BEL	NED	FRA	GBR	GER	ITA	USA	MEX; 11	RSA			NC	0
1964	Team Lotus	Lotus 33	Climax V8	MON	NED	BEL	FRA	GBR	GER	AUT	ITA	USA	MEX; 10			NC	0
1965	Team Lotus	Lotus 25	Climax V8	RSA	MON	BEL	FRA	GBR	NED	GER	ITA	USA; 12	MEX; Ret			NC	0
1966	Cooper Car Company	Cooper T81	Maserati V12	MON	BEL	FRA	GBR	NED	GER	ITA	USA	MEX; Ret				NC	0
1967	Team Lotus	Lotus 49	Cosworth V8	RSA	MON	NED	BEL	FRA	GBR	GER	CAN	ITA	USA; Ret	MEX; Ret		NC	0
1968	Gold Leaf Team Lotus	Lotus 49B	Cosworth V8	RSA	ESP	MON	BEL	NED	FRA	GBR	GER	ITA	CAN	USA	MEX; Ret	NC	0
