= Martin Brain =

British racing driver (1932–1970)

Martin Richard Brain (22 December 1932, Birmingham – 25 May 1970 (aged 37), Silverstone) was a British racing driver known for his exploits in British hillclimbs and club racing.

Brain was a familiar figure within the hillclimbing community both as driver and mechanic. The peak of his career was finishing as overall runner-up to Peter Lawson in the 1968 British Hillclimb Championship in a Cooper T81B F1 chassis which he had fitted with a 7.2l Chrysler V8 engine, taking one win and four second places. The following year he drove this car and a Cooper T86B BRM F1 car to take 4th place in the championship with a further two wins. Brain scored two race wins in club Formula Libre races, firstly at Silverstone in September 1969 and Croft in May 1970.

He died in a race organised by Nottingham Sportscar Club at Silverstone when his Cooper BRM left the track during a close dice with Graham Eden's Chevron and flipped.
