= Chris Irwin =

British racing driver (born 1942)

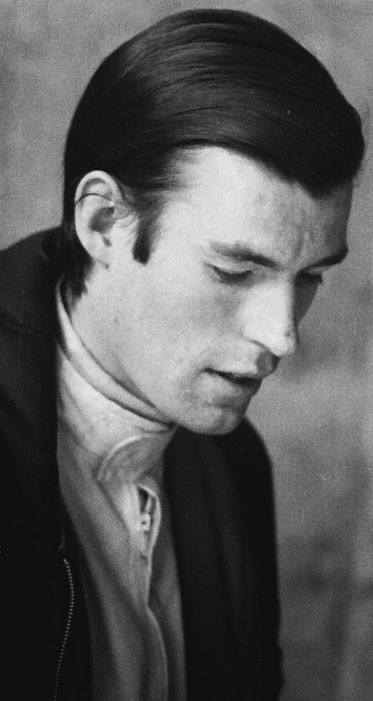
- Born: 27 June 1942 (age 84); Wandsworth, London

Formula One World Championship career
- Nationality: (United Kingdom) British
- Active years: 1966 - 1967
- Team(s): Brabham, Reg Parnell Racing
- Entries: 10
- Championships: 0
- Wins: 0
- Podiums: 0
- Career points: 2
- Pole positions: 0
- Fastest laps: 0
- First entry: 1966 British Grand Prix
- Last entry: 1967 Mexican Grand Prix

Christopher Frank Stuart Irwin (born 27 June 1942 in Wandsworth, London) is a British former racing driver. He participated in ten Formula One World Championship Grands Prix, debuting on 16 July 1966. He scored two championship points.

Irwin's career was ended prematurely by an accident he sustained when driving a Ford P68 sports prototype during practice for the 1968 1000km Nürburgring endurance race. He lost control of the notoriously twitchy car at the Flugplatz, the P68 flipping end over end after landing on its tail following a jump. He suffered severe head injuries but eventually recovered. However, it prevented him from racing again.

Irwin is still alive and reasonably well, but his whereabouts are largely unknown as he stays out of the public eye and away from motor racing events. In 2006, it was reported that he had become re-acquainted with a racing rival from the 1960s after a chance meeting in London, and that he sometimes still suffers flashbacks to his accident. Irwin was reported, however, to be in generally good condition.

In a rare appearance at a race meeting, Irwin attended the Thruxton Circuit's 40th anniversary celebrations in April 2008. A three-quarter page interview and a current photograph of him posing with old 1960s rivals and a Formula 2 car appeared in the June 2008 issue of Motor Sport magazine. He is currently living in rural Rutland in the UK.

== Racing record ==
=== Complete British Saloon Car Championship results ===
(key) (Races in bold indicate pole position; races in italics indicate fastest lap.)

Year	Team	Car	Class	1	2	3	4	5	6	7	8	DC	Pts	Class
1965	Don Moore	Morris Mini Cooper S	B	BRH	OUL; DNS	SNE	GOO	SIL	CRY	BRH	OUL	NC	0	NC

=== Complete Formula One World Championship results ===
(key)

Year	Entrant	Chassis	Engine	1	2	3	4	5	6	7	8	9	10	11	WDC	Points
1966	Brabham Racing Organisation	Brabham BT22	Climax FPF 2.8 L4	MON	BEL	FRA	GBR; 7	NED	GER	ITA	USA	MEX			NC	0
1967	Reg Parnell Motor Racing	Lotus 25	BRM P60 2.1 V8	RSA	MON	NED; 7									16th	2
1967	Reg Parnell Motor Racing	BRM P261	BRM P60 2.1 V8				BEL; Ret		GBR; 7						16th	2
1967	Reg Parnell Motor Racing	BRM P83	BRM P75 3.0 H16					FRA; 5		GER; 9	CAN; Ret	ITA; Ret	USA; Ret	MEX; Ret	16th	2

=== Non-Championship Formula One results ===
(key) (Races in bold indicate pole position) (Races in italics indicate fastest lap)

Year	Entrant	Chassis	Engine	1	2	3	4	5	6
1967	Reg Parnell Motor Racing	Lotus 25	BRM P60 2.1 V8	ROC; 6	SPR	INT; 7	SYR; 4	OUL	ESP

=== Complete Tasman Series results ===
Year	Car	1	2	3	4	5	6	Rank	Points
1967	BRM P261	PUK	WIG	LAK	WAR; Ret	SAN; 4	LON; 3	8th	7

=== Complete European Formula Two Championship results ===
Year	Entrant	Chassis	Engine	1	2	3	4	5	6	7	8	9	10	Pos.	Pts
1967	Lola Cars	Lola T100	BMW M11 1.6 L4	SNE; Ret	SIL							BRH; DNQ	VAL	6th	15
1967	Lola Cars	Lola T100	Ford Cosworth FVA 1.6 L4			NÜR; 7	**HOC**; Ret	TUL; 7	JAR; 3	ZAN; Ret	PER; Ret			6th	15
1968	Lola Cars	Lola T100	Ford Cosworth FVA 1.6 L4	HOC; 8	THR; Ret	JAR; Ret	ZOL; 1	CP	TUL	ZAN	PER	HOC	VAL	10th	9

== Sources ==
- Profile at www.grandprix.com
