= 1967 Canadian Grand Prix =

1967 Canadian Formula One race held in Bowmanville, Ontario

Race details
- Date: 27 August 1967
- Official name: VII Player's Grand Prix of Canada
- Location: Mosport International Raceway, Ontario, Canada
- Course: Permanent racing facility
- Course length: 3.957 km (2.458 miles)
- Distance: 90 laps, 356.13 km (221.22 miles)
- Weather: Rainy with temperatures up to 24.4 °C (75.9 °F); wind speeds up to 8 kilometres per hour (5.0 mph)

Pole position
Driver	(United Kingdom) Jim Clark	Lotus-Ford
- Time: 1:22.4

Fastest lap
Driver	(United Kingdom) Jim Clark	Lotus-Ford
- Time: 1:23.1

Podium
First	(Australia) Jack Brabham	Brabham-Repco
Second	(New Zealand) Denny Hulme	Brabham-Repco
Third	(United States) Dan Gurney	Eagle-Weslake

The 1967 Canadian Grand Prix was a Formula One motor race held at Mosport Park in Bowmanville, Ontario, Canada on August 27, 1967. The 90-lap contest was race 8 of 11 in both the 1967 World Championship of Drivers and the 1967 International Cup for Formula One Manufacturers. It was won by Jack Brabham driving for his own Brabham team. This was the first Canadian Grand Prix to have World Championship status.

Having already changed his battery on the grid, losing six laps, local driver Al Pease spun his private Eagle-Climax and stalled out on the circuit during the race, and suffered another flat battery. He ran back to the pits for a new one, ran back to the car, fitted the battery himself and continued. He was still running at the finish, albeit 43 laps down on Brabham.

== Classification ==
=== Qualifying ===
Pos	No	Driver	Constructor	Time	Gap
1	3	(United Kingdom) Jim Clark	Lotus-Ford	1:22.4	—
2	4	(United Kingdom) Graham Hill	Lotus-Ford	1:22.7	+0.3
3	2	(New Zealand) Denny Hulme	Brabham-Repco	1:23.2	+0.8
4	20	(New Zealand) Chris Amon	Ferrari	1:23.3	+0.9
5	10	(United States) Dan Gurney	Eagle-Weslake	1:23.4	+1.0
6	19	(New Zealand) Bruce McLaren	McLaren-BRM	1:23.5	+1.1
7	1	(Australia) Jack Brabham	Brabham-Repco	1:24.7	+2.3
8	71	(Austria) Jochen Rindt	Cooper-Maserati	1:24.9	+2.5
9	15	(United Kingdom) Jackie Stewart	BRM	1:25.4	+3.0
10	16	(United Kingdom) Mike Spence	BRM	1:25.8	+3.4
11	17	(United Kingdom) Chris Irwin	BRM	1:26.0	+3.6
12	12	(United Kingdom) David Hobbs	BRM	1:26.2	+3.8
13	14	(Switzerland) Jo Siffert	Cooper-Maserati	1:26.6	+4.2
14	8	(United Kingdom) Richard Attwood	Cooper-Maserati	1:27.1	+4.7
15	9	(Sweden) Jo Bonnier	Cooper-Maserati	1:27.3	+4.9
16	11	(Canada) Al Pease	Eagle-Climax	1:30.1	+7.7
17	5	(Canada) Eppie Wietzes	Lotus-Ford	1:30.8	+8.4
18	6	(United States) Mike Fisher	Lotus-BRM	1:31.9	+9.5
DNQ	41	(United States) Tom Jones	Cooper-Climax	1:51.9	+29.5

=== Race ===
Pos	No	Driver	Constructor	Laps	Time/Retired	Grid	Points
1	1	(Australia) Jack Brabham	Brabham-Repco	90	2:40:40.0	7	9
2	2	(New Zealand) Denny Hulme	Brabham-Repco	90	+ 1:01.9	3	6
3	10	(United States) Dan Gurney	Eagle-Weslake	89	+ 1 Lap	5	4
4	4	(United Kingdom) Graham Hill	Lotus-Ford	88	+ 2 Laps	2	3
5	16	(United Kingdom) Mike Spence	BRM	87	+ 3 Laps	10	2
6	20	(New Zealand) Chris Amon	Ferrari	87	+ 3 Laps	4	1
7	19	(New Zealand) Bruce McLaren	McLaren-BRM	86	+ 4 Laps	6	
8	9	(Sweden) Jo Bonnier	Cooper-Maserati	85	+ 5 Laps	15	
9	12	(United Kingdom) David Hobbs	BRM	85	+ 5 Laps	12	
10	8	(United Kingdom) Richard Attwood	Cooper-Maserati	84	+ 6 Laps	14	
11	6	(United States) Mike Fisher	Lotus-BRM	81	+ 9 Laps	18	
Ret	3	(United Kingdom) Jim Clark	Lotus-Ford	69	Ignition	1	
DSQ	5	(Canada) Eppie Wietzes	Lotus-Ford	69	Outside Assistance	17	
Ret	15	(United Kingdom) Jackie Stewart	BRM	65	Throttle	9	
NC	11	(Canada) Al Pease	Eagle-Climax	47	+ 43 Laps	16	
Ret	17	(United Kingdom) Chris Irwin	BRM	18	Spun Off	11	
Ret	71	(Austria) Jochen Rindt	Cooper-Maserati	4	Ignition	8	
DNS	14	(Switzerland) Jo Siffert	Cooper-Maserati		Ignition	(13)	
DNQ	41	(United States) Tom Jones	Cooper-Climax				

== Notes ==
- This was the Formula One World Championship debut for Canadian drivers Eppie Wietzes and Al Pease and for American drivers Mike Fisher and Tom Jones.
- This was the 30th pole position for Jim Clark, breaking the old record of 29 pole positions set by Juan Manuel Fangio at the 1958 Argentine Grand Prix.
- This was the 50th race for the Brabham team and their 10th Grand Prix win.
- This was the 100th race for a Maserati-powered car. In those 100 races, a Maserati-powered car had won 11 Grands Prix, had achieved 44 podiums, 11 pole positions, 16 fastest laps, 3 Grand Slams and had won 1 Driver's World Championship.

== Championship standings after the race ==
Drivers' Championship standings

	Pos	Driver	Points
	1	(New Zealand) Denny Hulme	43
	2	(Australia) Jack Brabham	34
1	3	(New Zealand) Chris Amon	20
1	4	(United Kingdom) Jim Clark	19
	5	(Mexico) Pedro Rodríguez	14

Constructors' Championship standings

	Pos	Constructor	Points
	1	(United Kingdom) Brabham-Repco	51
1	2	(United Kingdom) Lotus-Ford	22
1	3	(United Kingdom) Cooper-Maserati	21
	4	(Italy) Ferrari	20
1	5	(United States) Eagle-Weslake	13

- Notes: Only the top five positions are included for both sets of standings.

Previous race: 1967 German Grand Prix	FIA Formula One World Championship; 1967 season	Next race: 1967 Italian Grand Prix
Previous race: 1966 Canadian Grand Prix	Canadian Grand Prix	Next race: 1968 Canadian Grand Prix
