= 1967 Mexican Grand Prix =

Race details
- Date: October 22, 1967
- Official name: VI Gran Premio de Mexico
- Location: Ciudad Deportiva Magdalena Mixhuca, Mexico City, Mexico
- Course: Permanent racing facility
- Course length: 5.000 km (3.107 miles)
- Distance: 65 laps, 325.000 km (201.946 miles)

Pole position
Driver	(United Kingdom) Jim Clark	Lotus-Ford
- Time: 1:47.56

Fastest lap
Driver	(United Kingdom) Jim Clark	Lotus-Ford
- Time: 1:48.13

Podium
First	(United Kingdom) Jim Clark	Lotus-Ford
Second	(Australia) Jack Brabham	Brabham-Repco
Third	(New Zealand) Denny Hulme	Brabham-Repco

The 1967 Mexican Grand Prix was a Formula One motor race held at the Ciudad Deportiva Magdalena Mixhuca on 22 October 1967. It was race 11 of 11 in both the 1967 World Championship of Drivers and the 1967 International Cup for Formula One Manufacturers.

For the first time in 8 years, two teammates went into the last race with a chance of winning the title. Denny Hulme on 47 points required a fourth-place finish to claim the drivers' title. Jack Brabham with 42 points needed to win the race and for Hulme to finish fifth or lower.

The race was won by over a minute by Jim Clark, driving for Lotus-Ford, despite not being able to use his clutch during almost the entire race. New Zealander Denny Hulme clinched his only World Championship by coming home third, earning the necessary points to edge out teammate and three-time World Champion Jack Brabham in order to become the first and only New Zealander to win the Formula One World Championship so far.

== Classification ==
=== Qualifying ===
Pos	No	Driver	Constructor	Time	Gap
1	5	(United Kingdom) Jim Clark	Lotus-Ford	1:47.56	—
2	9	(New Zealand) Chris Amon	Ferrari	1:48.04	+0.48
3	11	(United States) Dan Gurney	Eagle-Weslake	1:48.10	+0.54
4	6	(United Kingdom) Graham Hill	Lotus-Ford	1:48.74	+1.18
5	1	(Australia) Jack Brabham	Brabham-Repco	1:49.08	+1.52
6	2	(New Zealand) Denny Hulme	Brabham-Repco	1:49.46	+1.90
7	3	(United Kingdom) John Surtees	Honda	1:49.80	+2.24
8	14	(New Zealand) Bruce McLaren	McLaren-BRM	1:50.06	+2.50
9	18	(Mexico) Moisés Solana	Lotus-Ford	1:50.52	+2.96
10	15	(Switzerland) Jo Siffert	Cooper-Maserati	1:51.89	+4.33
11	8	(United Kingdom) Mike Spence	BRM	1:52.25	+4.69
12	7	(United Kingdom) Jackie Stewart	BRM	1:52.34	+4.78
13	21	(Mexico) Pedro Rodríguez	Cooper-Maserati	1:52.85	+5.29
14	22	(France) Jean-Pierre Beltoise	Matra-Ford	1:53.08	+5.52
15	17	(United Kingdom) Chris Irwin	BRM	1:54.38	+6.82
16	12	(United Kingdom) Jonathan Williams	Ferrari	1:54.80	+7.24
17	16	(Sweden) Jo Bonnier	Cooper-Maserati	1:55.57	+8.01
18	10	(United States) Mike Fisher	Lotus-BRM	1:57.41	+9.85
19	19	(France) Guy Ligier	Brabham-Repco	1:58.45	+10.89

=== Race ===
Pos	No	Driver	Constructor	Laps	Time/Retired	Grid	Points
1	5	(United Kingdom) Jim Clark	Lotus-Ford	65	1:59:28.70	1	9
2	1	(Australia) Jack Brabham	Brabham-Repco	65	+1:25.36	5	6
3	2	(New Zealand) Denny Hulme	Brabham-Repco	64	+1 lap	6	4
4	3	(United Kingdom) John Surtees	Honda	64	+1 lap	7	3
5	8	(United Kingdom) Mike Spence	BRM	63	+2 laps	11	2
6	21	(Mexico) Pedro Rodríguez	Cooper-Maserati	63	+2 laps	13	1
7	22	(France) Jean-Pierre Beltoise	Matra-Ford	63	+2 laps	14	
8	12	(United Kingdom) Jonathan Williams	Ferrari	63	+2 laps	16	
9	9	(New Zealand) Chris Amon	Ferrari	62	Out of Fuel	2	
10	16	(Sweden) Jo Bonnier	Cooper-Maserati	61	+4 laps	17	
11	19	(France) Guy Ligier	Brabham-Repco	61	+4 laps	19	
12	15	(Switzerland) Jo Siffert	Cooper-Maserati	59	Overheating	10	
Ret	14	(New Zealand) Bruce McLaren	McLaren-BRM	45	Oil Pressure	8	
Ret	17	(United Kingdom) Chris Irwin	BRM	33	Oil Leak	15	
Ret	7	(United Kingdom) Jackie Stewart	BRM	24	Engine	12	
Ret	6	(United Kingdom) Graham Hill	Lotus-Ford	18	Half Shaft	4	
Ret	18	(Mexico) Moisés Solana	Lotus-Ford	12	Suspension	9	
Ret	11	(United States) Dan Gurney	Eagle-Weslake	4	Radiator	3	
DNS	10	(United States) Mike Fisher	Lotus-BRM		Fuel System	18	

== Notes ==
- This was the only Formula One World Championship start for British driver Jonathan Williams.
- This was the second win of the Mexican Grand Prix by Jim Clark and Lotus, setting a new record.
- This was the tenth Grand Slam (pole position, fastest lap, Grand Prix win) for Jim Clark, breaking the old record set by Juan Manuel Fangio at the 1957 German Grand Prix.

== Championship standings after the race ==
Drivers' Championship standings

	Pos	Driver	Points
	1	(New Zealand) Denny Hulme	51
	2	(Australia) Jack Brabham	46 (48)
	3	(United Kingdom) Jim Clark	41
1	4	(United Kingdom) John Surtees	20
1	5	(New Zealand) Chris Amon	20

Constructors' Championship standings

	Pos	Constructor	Points
	1	(United Kingdom) Brabham-Repco	63 (67)
	2	(United Kingdom) Lotus-Ford	44
	3	(United Kingdom) Cooper-Maserati	28
1	4	(Japan) Honda	20
1	5	(Italy) Ferrari	20

- Notes: Only the top five positions are included for both sets of standings. Only the best 5 results from the first 6 rounds and the best 4 results from the last 5 rounds counted towards the Championship. Numbers without parentheses are Championship points; numbers in parentheses are total points scored.

Previous race: 1967 United States Grand Prix	FIA Formula One World Championship; 1967 season	Next race: 1968 South African Grand Prix
Previous race: 1966 Mexican Grand Prix	Mexican Grand Prix	Next race: 1968 Mexican Grand Prix
