= 1967 United States Grand Prix =

Race details
- Date: October 1, 1967
- Official name: X United States Grand Prix
- Location: Watkins Glen Grand Prix Race Course; Watkins Glen, New York
- Course: Permanent road course
- Course length: 3.78 km (2.35 miles)
- Distance: 108 laps, 408.2 km (253.8 miles)
- Weather: Sunny

Pole position
Driver	(United Kingdom) Graham Hill	Lotus-Ford
- Time: 1:05.48

Fastest lap
Driver	(United Kingdom) Graham Hill	Lotus-Ford
- Time: 1:06.0 on lap 81

Podium
First	(United Kingdom) Jim Clark	Lotus-Ford
Second	(United Kingdom) Graham Hill	Lotus-Ford
Third	(New Zealand) Denny Hulme	Brabham-Repco

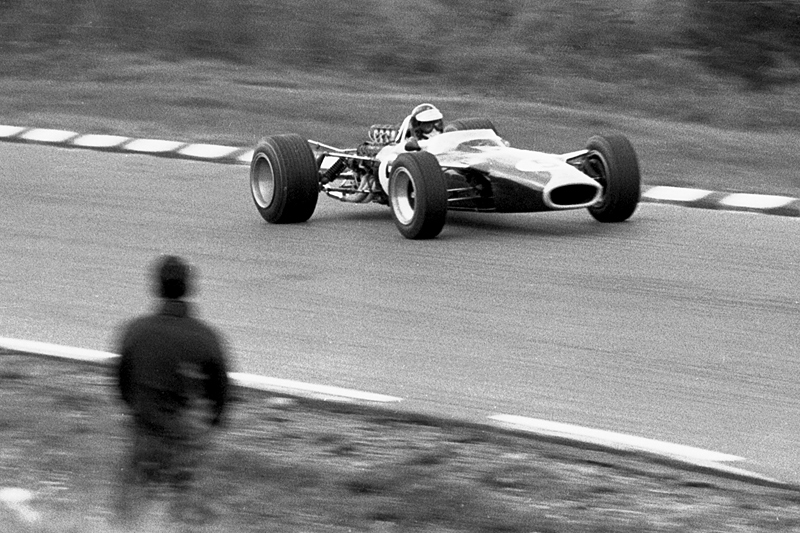
Winner Jim Clark in a Lotus 49

The 1967 United States Grand Prix was a Formula One motor race held on October 1, 1967, at the Watkins Glen Grand Prix Race Course in Watkins Glen, New York. It was race 10 of 11 in both the 1967 World Championship of Drivers and the 1967 International Cup for Formula One Manufacturers. The 108-lap race was won by Lotus driver Jim Clark after he started from second position. His teammate Graham Hill finished second and Brabham driver Denny Hulme came in third.

== Summary ==
Jim Clark nursed his limping car through the final two laps and came home six seconds ahead of Lotus teammate Graham Hill to win his third and final American Grand Prix. It was the Scot's third win of the season, and the twenty-third of his career. The following April, Clark was killed in a Formula Two race in Germany, but two more wins (in Mexico and South Africa) gave him the most wins in Grand Prix history with 25, one more than Argentina's Juan Manuel Fangio.

Since they had appeared at the third race of the year in the Netherlands, Colin Chapman's Lotus 49s had been the fastest cars on the track, taking the pole in all seven races they entered. The reliability of the Lotus cars had been another issue entirely, however, and, when the series returned to North America for the final two races, the only remaining contenders for the Driver's Championship were Brabham teammates Sir Jack (the defending Champion) and Denny Hulme.

Friday practice began under a dark, misty cloud and, as the weather slowly improved, the Lotus cars again posted the fastest times with Clark ahead of Hill. Saturday was much clearer, and nearly everyone improved their time from the previous day. Late in the session, Clark posted a 1:06.07, breaking the 125 mph average speed barrier, and seemingly securing the pole. Hill, however, was still set on winning the $1,000 prize for the pole, and, with Clark testing his car's handling on full tanks, he snatched the prize from his teammate with a time of 1:05.48. Dan Gurney, who had become the first American to win a Grand Prix in a car of his own design at Belgium, was third in the Eagle-Weslake, and Chris Amon was fourth in the only Ferrari present.

A crowd of 80,000 was greeted with beautiful bright sun on race day. The previous evening, Walter Hayes, public affairs director of Ford of Dagenham, who had contributed £75,000 toward the development of the Cosworth-Ford V8, demonstrated his confidence in a good showing by the two Lotus-Ford drivers when he proposed that they should flip a coin to choose the winner, in case both cars were in contention at the end of the race! The drivers agreed when they decided that the arrangement could be reversed in Mexico, and Hill won the toss.

At the start, the Lotus teammates jumped into the lead, and at the end of the first lap, Hill led Clark, Gurney, Brabham, Amon, Hulme and Bruce McLaren. On lap two, Gurney moved past Clark for second place, and soon after, Hulme moved ahead of Amon and then his team leader, Brabham. On lap 10, Clark replaced Gurney in second, while Amon began to move forward in the Ferrari. He first got around Brabham, then on lap 21 passed Hulme and Gurney to take third, as the American slowed with a broken suspension.

To everyone's surprise, Amon closed the gap to the Lotus pair, but lost four seconds trying to lap Jo Bonnier's Cooper. He closed up again, gaining ground in the twisty sections, but losing as they exited the fast corners. The three leaders lapped Jo Siffert and John Surtees, but apparently Surtees objected to Amon's hand signals as he did, and the Honda squeezed back ahead of the Ferrari under braking, despite being three laps behind! On lap 61, Surtees developed a misfire, and Amon shot by to take off after the leaders again.

Hill surrendered the lead to Clark when his clutch froze and he was briefly unable to change gear. As Clark pulled ahead, Amon caught Hill on lap 65. While the Englishman struggled to find a gear, the Ferrari went through for second place. Amon, however, suddenly saw his oil pressure drop on lap 76, and Hill regained second place. After eight laps, when Hill's Lotus again was unable to select a gear, Amon moved back into second until lap 96, when, after a scintillating drive, his engine finally ran out of oil entirely.

With Hill too far behind to take up the claim on first he had 'won' the night before, Clark seemed home free. Then, halfway through lap 106, a support broke on the top of his right rear suspension, causing the wheel to sag inward. The Scot craned his neck around to assess the damage, and began nursing the car toward the finish, taking particular care on left-handers! Hill was 45 seconds back with two laps to run, 23 seconds as they entered the final lap. With both green and yellow Lotus cars ailing, they limped around the last lap. Finally, Clark crossed the line, six seconds ahead of Hill.

Hulme might have been able to do something about them at the end, but his Brabham's engine was sputtering for lack of fuel, and he coasted across in third.

== Classification ==
=== Qualifying ===
Pos	No	Driver	Constructor	Time	Gap
1	6	(United Kingdom) Graham Hill	Lotus-Ford	1:05.48	—
2	5	(United Kingdom) Jim Clark	Lotus-Ford	1:06.07	+0.59
3	11	(United States) Dan Gurney	Eagle-Weslake	1:06.64	+1.16
4	9	(New Zealand) Chris Amon	Ferrari	1:06.65	+1.17
5	1	(Australia) Jack Brabham	Brabham-Repco	1:06.73	+1.25
6	2	(New Zealand) Denny Hulme	Brabham-Repco	1:07.45	+1.97
7	18	(Mexico) Moisés Solana	Lotus-Ford	1:07.88	+2.40
8	4	(Austria) Jochen Rindt	Cooper-Maserati	1:07.99	+2.51
9	14	(New Zealand) Bruce McLaren	McLaren-BRM	1:08.05	+2.57
10	7	(United Kingdom) Jackie Stewart	BRM	1:08.09	+2.61
11	3	(United Kingdom) John Surtees	Honda	1:08.13	+2.65
12	15	(Switzerland) Jo Siffert	Cooper-Maserati	1:08.25	+2.77
13	8	(United Kingdom) Mike Spence	BRM	1:09.01	+3.53
14	17	(United Kingdom) Chris Irwin	BRM	1:09.64	+4.16
15	16	(Sweden) Jo Bonnier	Cooper-Maserati	1:09.78	+4.30
16	21	(Belgium) Jacky Ickx	Cooper-Maserati	1:09.94	+4.46
17	19	(France) Guy Ligier	Brabham-Repco	1:11.32	+5.84
18	22	(France) Jean-Pierre Beltoise	Matra-Ford	1:12.05	+6.57

=== Race ===
Pos	No	Driver	Constructor	Laps	Time/Retired	Grid	Points
1	5	(United Kingdom) Jim Clark	Lotus-Ford	108	2:03:13.2	2	9
2	6	(United Kingdom) Graham Hill	Lotus-Ford	108	+ 6.3	1	6
3	2	(New Zealand) Denny Hulme	Brabham-Repco	107	+ 1 Lap	6	4
4	15	(Switzerland) Jo Siffert	Cooper-Maserati	106	+ 2 Laps	12	3
5	1	(Australia) Jack Brabham	Brabham-Repco	104	+ 4 Laps	5	2
6	16	(Sweden) Jo Bonnier	Cooper-Maserati	101	+ 7 Laps	15	1
7	22	(France) Jean-Pierre Beltoise	Matra-Ford	101	+ 7 Laps	18	
Ret	3	(United Kingdom) John Surtees	Honda	96	Alternator	11	
Ret	9	(New Zealand) Chris Amon	Ferrari	95	Engine	4	
Ret	7	(United Kingdom) Jackie Stewart	BRM	72	Injection	10	
Ret	21	(Belgium) Jacky Ickx	Cooper-Maserati	45	Overheating	16	
Ret	19	(France) Guy Ligier	Brabham-Repco	43	Engine	17	
Ret	17	(United Kingdom) Chris Irwin	BRM	41	Engine	14	
Ret	8	(United Kingdom) Mike Spence	BRM	35	Engine	13	
Ret	4	(Austria) Jochen Rindt	Cooper-Maserati	33	Engine	8	
Ret	11	(United States) Dan Gurney	Eagle-Weslake	24	Suspension	3	
Ret	14	(New Zealand) Bruce McLaren	McLaren-BRM	16	Water Leak	9	
Ret	18	(Mexico) Moisés Solana	Lotus-Ford	7	Ignition	7	

== Notes ==
- This was the fifth win of the United States Grand Prix for Lotus.

== Championship standings after the race ==
Drivers' Championship standings

Pos	Driver	Points
1	(New Zealand) Denny Hulme	47
2	(Australia) Jack Brabham	42
3	(United Kingdom) Jim Clark	32
4	(New Zealand) Chris Amon	20
5	(United Kingdom) John Surtees	17

Constructors' Championship standings

Pos	Constructor	Points
1	(United Kingdom) Brabham-Repco	61
2	(United Kingdom) Lotus-Ford	35
3	(United Kingdom) Cooper-Maserati	27
4	(Italy) Ferrari	20
5	(Japan) Honda	17

- Notes: Only the top five positions are included for both sets of standings.

Previous race: 1967 Italian Grand Prix	FIA Formula One World Championship; 1967 season	Next race: 1967 Mexican Grand Prix
Previous race: 1966 United States Grand Prix	United States Grand Prix	Next race: 1968 United States Grand Prix
