= 1967 Italian Grand Prix =

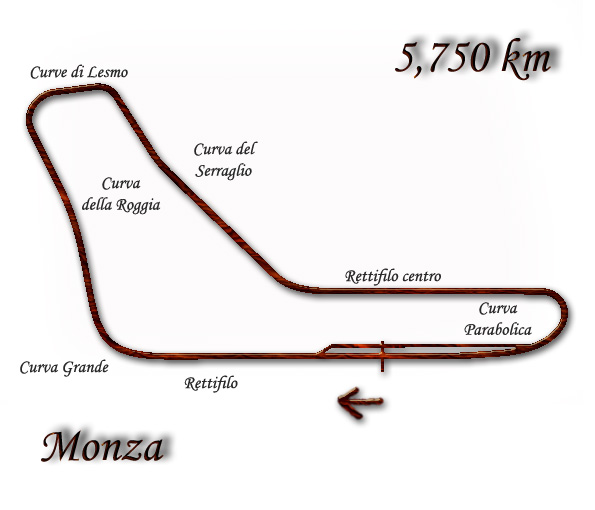
- Autodromo Nazionale di Monza layout

Race details
- Date: 10 September 1967
- Official name: XXXVIII Gran Premio d'Italia
- Location: Autodromo Nazionale di Monza, Monza, Italy
- Course: Permanent road course
- Course length: 5.75 km (3.573 miles)
- Distance: 68 laps, 391.006 km (242.960 miles)
- Weather: Warm, dry

Pole position
Driver	(United Kingdom) Jim Clark	Lotus-Ford
- Time: 1:28.5

Fastest lap
Driver	(United Kingdom) Jim Clark	Lotus-Ford
- Time: 1:28.5 on lap 26

Podium
First	(United Kingdom) John Surtees	Honda
Second	(Australia) Jack Brabham	Brabham-Repco
Third	(United Kingdom) Jim Clark	Lotus-Ford

The 1967 Italian Grand Prix was a Formula One motor race held at the Autodromo Nazionale di Monza on 10 September 1967. It was race 9 of 11 in both the 1967 World Championship of Drivers and the 1967 International Cup for Formula One Manufacturers. The race was won by British driver John Surtees driving a Honda. It was the sixth and final career victory for Surtees, as well as the first ever race for the Honda RA300 which he drove to victory. This was the first Formula One race where start lights were used.

This race is considered one of Jim Clark's greatest performances in Formula One. He led the race until lap 12 when he picked up a puncture and lost an entire lap. He then spent the next 48 laps recovering through the field, taking the lead on lap 60, and pulled away. But on the final lap, a lack of fuel in Clark's Lotus 49 allowed Jack Brabham and Surtees to pass the Scotsman and finish first and second, with Surtees ahead by less than a car length at the line. This was the second victory for the Honda F1 team, and the last for the factory team until Jenson Button won the 2006 Hungarian Grand Prix.

== Classification ==
=== Qualifying ===
Pos	No	Driver	Constructor	Time	Gap
1	20	(United Kingdom) Jim Clark	Lotus-Ford	1:28.5	—
2	16	(Australia) Jack Brabham	Brabham-Repco	1:28.8	+0.3
3	4	(New Zealand) Bruce McLaren	McLaren-BRM	1:29.31	+0.81
4	2	(New Zealand) Chris Amon	Ferrari	1:29.35	+0.85
5	8	(United States) Dan Gurney	Eagle-Weslake	1:29.38	+0.88
6	18	(New Zealand) Denny Hulme	Brabham-Repco	1:29.46	+0.96
7	34	(United Kingdom) Jackie Stewart	BRM	1:29.6	+1.1
8	22	(United Kingdom) Graham Hill	Lotus-Ford	1:29.7	+1.2
9	14	(United Kingdom) John Surtees	Honda	1:30.3	+1.8
10	10	(Italy) Ludovico Scarfiotti	Eagle-Weslake	1:30.8	+2.3
11	30	(Austria) Jochen Rindt	Cooper-Maserati	1:31.3	+2.8
12	36	(United Kingdom) Mike Spence	BRM	1:32.1	+3.6
13	6	(Switzerland) Jo Siffert	Cooper-Maserati	1:32.3	+3.8
14	26	(Sweden) Jo Bonnier	Cooper-Maserati	1:32.5	+4.0
15	32	(Belgium) Jacky Ickx	Cooper-Maserati	1:33.0	+4.5
16	38	(United Kingdom) Chris Irwin	BRM	1:33.2	+4.7
17	24	(Italy) Giancarlo Baghetti	Lotus-Ford	1:35.2	+6.7
18	12	(France) Guy Ligier	Brabham-Repco	1:37.3	+8.8

=== Race ===
Pos	No	Driver	Constructor	Laps	Time/Retired	Grid	Points
1	14	(United Kingdom) John Surtees	Honda	68	1:43:45.0	9	9
2	16	(Australia) Jack Brabham	Brabham-Repco	68	+ 0.2	2	6
3	20	(United Kingdom) Jim Clark	Lotus-Ford	68	+ 23.1	1	4
4	30	(Austria) Jochen Rindt	Cooper-Maserati	68	+ 56.6	11	3
5	36	(United Kingdom) Mike Spence	BRM	67	+ 1 Lap	12	2
6	32	(Belgium) Jacky Ickx	Cooper-Maserati	66	+ 2 Laps	15	1
7	2	(New Zealand) Chris Amon	Ferrari	64	+ 4 Laps	4	
Ret	22	(United Kingdom) Graham Hill	Lotus-Ford	58	Engine	8	
Ret	6	(Switzerland) Jo Siffert	Cooper-Maserati	50	Accident	13	
Ret	24	(Italy) Giancarlo Baghetti	Lotus-Ford	50	Engine	17	
Ret	4	(New Zealand) Bruce McLaren	McLaren-BRM	46	Engine	3	
Ret	26	(Sweden) Jo Bonnier	Cooper-Maserati	46	Overheating	14	
Ret	34	(United Kingdom) Jackie Stewart	BRM	45	Engine	7	
Ret	18	(New Zealand) Denny Hulme	Brabham-Repco	30	Overheating	6	
Ret	12	(France) Guy Ligier	Brabham-Repco	26	Engine	18	
Ret	38	(United Kingdom) Chris Irwin	BRM	16	Injection	16	
Ret	10	(Italy) Ludovico Scarfiotti	Eagle-Weslake	5	Engine	10	
Ret	8	(United States) Dan Gurney	Eagle-Weslake	4	Engine	5	

== Championship standings after the race ==
Drivers' Championship standings

	Pos	Driver	Points
	1	(New Zealand) Denny Hulme	43
	2	(Australia) Jack Brabham	40
1	3	(United Kingdom) Jim Clark	23
1	4	(New Zealand) Chris Amon	20
4	5	(United Kingdom) John Surtees	17

Constructors' Championship standings

	Pos	Constructor	Points
	1	(United Kingdom) Brabham-Repco	57
	2	(United Kingdom) Lotus-Ford	26
	3	(United Kingdom) Cooper-Maserati	24
	4	(Italy) Ferrari	20
2	5	(Japan) Honda	17

- Notes: Only the top five positions are included for both sets of standings.

Previous race: 1967 Canadian Grand Prix	FIA Formula One World Championship; 1967 season	Next race: 1967 United States Grand Prix
Previous race: 1966 Italian Grand Prix	Italian Grand Prix	Next race: 1968 Italian Grand Prix
Previous race: 1966 French Grand Prix	European Grand Prix (Designated European Grand Prix)	Next race: 1968 German Grand Prix
