= 1967 Dutch Grand Prix =

Race details
- Date: June 4, 1967
- Official name: XV Grote Prijs van Nederland
- Location: Circuit Zandvoort, Zandvoort, Netherlands
- Course: Permanent racing facility
- Course length: 4.252 km (2.642 miles)
- Distance: 90 laps, 382.68 km (237.78 miles)

Pole position
Driver	(United Kingdom) Graham Hill	Lotus-Ford
- Time: 1:24.6

Fastest lap
Driver	(United Kingdom) Jim Clark	Lotus-Ford
- Time: 1:28.08

Podium
First	(United Kingdom) Jim Clark	Lotus-Ford
Second	(Australia) Jack Brabham	Brabham-Repco
Third	(New Zealand) Denny Hulme	Brabham-Repco

The 1967 Dutch Grand Prix was a Formula One motor race held at Zandvoort on June 4, 1967. It was race 3 of 11 in both the 1967 World Championship of Drivers and the 1967 International Cup for Formula One Manufacturers. The race saw the debut of the Lotus 49, equipped with the Ford Cosworth DFV engine. Having tested it for a long time, Graham Hill took pole for the race. By contrast, this was the first time that the other Lotus driver, Jim Clark, ever drove the car, which — combined with mechanical issues — led to him only qualifying in eighth. Hill retired from the lead while Clark started to get a feel for the car as he fought his way through the field to record the car's first victory in its first race. The meeting also saw the first appearance of the Brabham BT24 and the BRM P115, but neither took part in the race.

This was the last Grand Prix for the Lotus 25. Chassis R4 being driven by Chris Irwin, was the same chassis used by Jim Clark to win the 1963 World Drivers' title.

== Classification ==
=== Qualifying ===
Pos	No	Driver	Constructor	Time	Gap
1	6	(United Kingdom) Graham Hill	Lotus-Ford	1:24.6	—
2	15	(United States) Dan Gurney	Eagle-Weslake	1:25.1	+0.5
3	1	(Australia) Jack Brabham	Brabham-Repco	1:25.6	+1.0
4	12	(Austria) Jochen Rindt	Cooper-Maserati	1:26.5	+1.9
5	14	(Mexico) Pedro Rodríguez	Cooper-Maserati	1:26.58	+1.98
6	7	(United Kingdom) John Surtees	Honda	1:26.65	+2.05
7	2	(New Zealand) Denny Hulme	Brabham-Repco	1:26.65	+2.05
8	5	(United Kingdom) Jim Clark	Lotus-Ford	1:26.8	+2.2
9	3	(New Zealand) Chris Amon	Ferrari	1:26.9	+2.3
10	4	(United Kingdom) Mike Parkes	Ferrari	1:27.0	+2.4
11	9	(United Kingdom) Jackie Stewart	BRM	1:27.2	+2.6
12	10	(United Kingdom) Mike Spence	BRM	1:27.4	+2.8
13	18	(United Kingdom) Chris Irwin	Lotus-BRM	1:27.5	+2.9
14	17	(New Zealand) Bruce McLaren	McLaren-BRM	1:27.7	+3.1
15	22	(Italy) Ludovico Scarfiotti	Ferrari	1:27.9	+3.3
16	20	(Switzerland) Jo Siffert	Cooper-Maserati	1:28.8	+4.2
17	21	(United Kingdom) Bob Anderson	Brabham-Climax	1:30.6	+6.0

=== Race ===
Pos	No	Driver	Constructor	Laps	Time/Retired	Grid	Points
1	5	(United Kingdom) Jim Clark	Lotus-Ford	90	2:14:45.1	8	9
2	1	(Australia) Jack Brabham	Brabham-Repco	90	+23.6	3	6
3	2	(New Zealand) Denny Hulme	Brabham-Repco	90	+25.7	7	4
4	3	(New Zealand) Chris Amon	Ferrari	90	+27.3	9	3
5	4	(United Kingdom) Mike Parkes	Ferrari	89	+1 lap	10	2
6	22	(Italy) Ludovico Scarfiotti	Ferrari	89	+1 lap	15	1
7	18	(United Kingdom) Chris Irwin	Lotus-BRM	88	+2 laps	13	
8	10	(United Kingdom) Mike Spence	BRM	87	+3 laps	12	
9	21	(United Kingdom) Bob Anderson	Brabham-Climax	86	+4 laps	17	
10	20	(Switzerland) Jo Siffert	Cooper-Maserati	83	+7 laps	16	
Ret	7	(United Kingdom) John Surtees	Honda	73	Throttle	6	
Ret	9	(United Kingdom) Jackie Stewart	BRM	51	Brakes	11	
Ret	12	(Austria) Jochen Rindt	Cooper-Maserati	41	Suspension	4	
Ret	14	(Mexico) Pedro Rodríguez	Cooper-Maserati	39	Gearbox	5	
Ret	6	(United Kingdom) Graham Hill	Lotus-Ford	11	Engine	1	
Ret	15	(United States) Dan Gurney	Eagle-Weslake	8	Injection	2	
Ret	17	(New Zealand) Bruce McLaren	McLaren-BRM	1	Accident	14	

== Notes ==
- This was Jim Clark's 24th fastest lap, breaking the old record of 23 fastest laps set by Juan Manuel Fangio at the 1958 Argentine Grand Prix.
- This was the fourth win of the Dutch Grand Prix for Lotus. This broke the record of wins at Zandvoort by Ferrari at the 1961 Dutch Grand Prix.
- This was the first pole position, fastest lap, podium finish and Grand Prix win for a Ford-Cosworth-powered car.

== Championship standings after the race ==
Drivers' Championship standings

	Pos	Driver	Points
	1	(New Zealand) Denny Hulme	16
	2	(Mexico) Pedro Rodríguez	11
10	3	(United Kingdom) Jim Clark	9
5	4	(Australia) Jack Brabham	7
1	5	(New Zealand) Chris Amon	7

Constructors' Championship standings

	Pos	Constructor	Points
	1	(United Kingdom) Brabham-Repco	18
	2	(United Kingdom) Cooper-Maserati	11
12	3	(United Kingdom) Lotus-Ford	9
2	4	(Italy) Ferrari	7
2	5	(United Kingdom) Lotus-BRM	6

- Notes: Only the top five positions are included for both sets of standings.

Previous race: 1967 Monaco Grand Prix	FIA Formula One World Championship; 1967 season	Next race: 1967 Belgian Grand Prix
Previous race: 1966 Dutch Grand Prix	Dutch Grand Prix	Next race: 1968 Dutch Grand Prix
