= Honda Grand Prix results =

These are the complete results achieved by Honda cars and engines in Formula One.

== Formula One World Championship results ==
=== As a constructor ===
==== Works entries ====
(key)

Year	Chassis	Engine	Tyres	Drivers	1	2	3	4	5	6	7	8	9	10	11	12	13	14	15	16	17	18	Points	WCC
1964	RA271	RA271E; 1.5 V12	D		MON	NED	BEL	FRA	GBR	GER	AUT	ITA	USA	MEX									0	—
1964	RA271	RA271E; 1.5 V12	D	(United States) Ronnie Bucknum						13		Ret	Ret										0	—
1965	RA272	RA272E; 1.5 V12	G		RSA	MON	BEL	FRA	GBR	NED	GER	ITA	USA	MEX									11	6th
1965	RA272	RA272E; 1.5 V12	G	(United States) Richie Ginther		Ret	6	Ret	Ret	6		14	7	1									11	6th
1965	RA272	RA272E; 1.5 V12	G	(United States) Ronnie Bucknum		Ret	Ret	Ret				Ret	13	5									11	6th
1966	RA273	RA273E; 3.0 V12	G		MON	BEL	FRA	GBR	NED	GER	ITA	USA	MEX										3	8th
1966	RA273	RA273E; 3.0 V12	G	(United States) Richie Ginther							Ret	NC	4^{F}										3	8th
1966	RA273	RA273E; 3.0 V12	G	(United States) Ronnie Bucknum								Ret	8										3	8th
1967	RA273	RA273E; 3.0 V12	F		RSA	MON	NED	BEL	FRA	GBR	GER	CAN	ITA	USA	MEX								20	4th
1967	RA273	RA273E; 3.0 V12	F	(United Kingdom) John Surtees	3	Ret	Ret	Ret		6	4												20	4th
1967	RA300	RA273E; 3.0 V12	F	(United Kingdom) John Surtees									1	Ret	4								20	4th
1968	RA300	RA273E; 3.0 V12	F		RSA	ESP	MON	BEL	NED	FRA	GBR	GER	ITA	CAN	USA	MEX							14	6th
1968	RA300	RA273E; 3.0 V12	F	(United Kingdom) John Surtees	8																		14	6th
1968	RA301	RA301E; 3.0 V12	F	(United Kingdom) John Surtees		Ret	Ret	Ret^{F}	Ret	2	5	Ret	Ret^{P}	Ret	3	Ret							14	6th
1968	RA301	RA301E; 3.0 V12	F	(United Kingdom) David Hobbs									Ret										14	6th
1968	RA302	RA302E; 3.0 V8	F	(France) Jo Schlesser						Ret													14	6th
1969 – 2005: Honda did not compete as a constructor.
2006	RA106	RA806E; 2.4 V8	MI		BHR	MAL	AUS	SMR	EUR	ESP	MON	GBR	CAN	USA	FRA	GER	HUN	TUR	ITA	CHN	JPN	BRA	86	4th
2006	RA106	RA806E; 2.4 V8	MI	(Brazil) Rubens Barrichello	15	10	7	10	5	7	4	10	Ret	6	Ret	Ret	4	8	6	6	12	7	86	4th
2006	RA106	RA806E; 2.4 V8	MI	(United Kingdom) Jenson Button	4	3	10^{P}^{†}	7	Ret	6	11	Ret	9	Ret	Ret	4	1	4	5	4	4	3	86	4th
2007	RA107	RA807E; 2.4 V8	B		AUS	MAL	BHR	ESP	MON	CAN	USA	FRA	GBR	EUR	HUN	TUR	ITA	BEL	JPN	CHN	BRA		6	8th
2007	RA107	RA807E; 2.4 V8	B	(United Kingdom) Jenson Button	15	12	Ret	12	11	Ret	12	8	10	Ret	Ret	13	8	Ret	11^{†}	5	Ret		6	8th
2007	RA107	RA807E; 2.4 V8	B	(Brazil) Rubens Barrichello	11	11	13	10	10	12	Ret	11	9	11	18	17	10	13	10	15	Ret		6	8th
2008	RA108	RA808E 2.4 V8	B		AUS	MAL	BHR	ESP	TUR	MON	CAN	FRA	GBR	GER	HUN	EUR	BEL	ITA	SIN	JPN	CHN	BRA	14	9th
2008	RA108	RA808E 2.4 V8	B	(United Kingdom) Jenson Button	Ret	10	Ret	6	11	11	11	Ret	Ret	17	12	13	15	15	9	14	16	13	14	9th
2008	RA108	RA808E 2.4 V8	B	(Brazil) Rubens Barrichello	DSQ	13	11	Ret	14	6	7	14	3	Ret	16	16	Ret	17	Ret	13	11	15	14	9th

Notes

- ^{†} – Driver failed to finish the race, but was classified as they had completed greater than 90% of the race distance.

==== Non-works entries ====
(key)

Year	Entrant	Chassis	Engine	Tyres	Drivers	1	2	3	4	5	6	7	8	9	10	11	12
1968	Joakim Bonnier Racing Team	RA301	RA301E; 3.0 V12	F		RSA	ESP	MON	BEL	NED	FRA	GBR	GER	ITA	CAN	USA	MEX
1968	Joakim Bonnier Racing Team	RA301	RA301E; 3.0 V12	F	(Sweden) Joakim Bonnier												5

=== As an engine supplier ===
==== 1983–1992 ====
(key)

Year	Entrant	Chassis	Engine	Tyres	Drivers	1	2	3	4	5	6	7	8	9	10	11	12	13	14	15	16	Points	WCC
1983	Spirit Racing	Spirit 201; Spirit 201C	RA163E; 1.5 V6 t	G		BRA	USW	FRA	SMR	MON	BEL	DET	CAN	GBR	GER	AUT	NED	ITA	EUR	RSA		0	NC
1983	Spirit Racing	Spirit 201; Spirit 201C	RA163E; 1.5 V6 t	G	(Sweden) Stefan Johansson									Ret	Ret	12	7	Ret	14			0	NC
1983	TAG Williams Racing Team	Williams FW09	RA163E; 1.5 V6 t	G	(Finland) Keke Rosberg															5		2	11th
1983	TAG Williams Racing Team	Williams FW09	RA163E; 1.5 V6 t	G	(France) Jacques Laffite															Ret		2	11th
1984	Williams Grand Prix Engineering	Williams FW09; Williams FW09B	RA163E; 1.5 V6 t RA164E; 1.5 V6 t	G		BRA	RSA	BEL	SMR	FRA	MON	CAN	DET	DAL	GBR	GER	AUT	NED	ITA	EUR	POR	25.5	6th
1984	Williams Grand Prix Engineering	Williams FW09; Williams FW09B	RA163E; 1.5 V6 t RA164E; 1.5 V6 t	G	(Finland) Keke Rosberg	2	Ret	4	Ret	6	4^{‡}	Ret	Ret	1	Ret	Ret	Ret	8	Ret	Ret	Ret	25.5	6th
1984	Williams Grand Prix Engineering	Williams FW09; Williams FW09B	RA163E; 1.5 V6 t RA164E; 1.5 V6 t	G	(France) Jacques Laffite	Ret	Ret	Ret	Ret	8	8	Ret	5	4	Ret	Ret	Ret	Ret	Ret	Ret	14	25.5	6th
1985	Canon Williams Honda Team	Williams FW10	RA164E; 1.5 V6 t RA165E; 1.5 V6 t	G		BRA	POR	SMR	MON	CAN	DET	FRA	GBR	GER	AUT	NED	ITA	BEL	EUR	RSA	AUS	71	3rd
1985	Canon Williams Honda Team	Williams FW10	RA164E; 1.5 V6 t RA165E; 1.5 V6 t	G	(Finland) Keke Rosberg	Ret	Ret	Ret	8	4	1	2^{P}^{F}	Ret^{P}	12^{†}	Ret	Ret	Ret	4	3	2^{F}	1^{F}	71	3rd
1985	Canon Williams Honda Team	Williams FW10	RA164E; 1.5 V6 t RA165E; 1.5 V6 t	G	(United Kingdom) Nigel Mansell	Ret	5	5	7	6	Ret	DNS	Ret	6	Ret	6	11^{F}^{†}	2	1	1^{P}	Ret	71	3rd
1986	Canon Williams Honda Team	Williams FW11	RA166E; 1.5 V6 t	G		BRA	ESP	SMR	MON	BEL	CAN	DET	FRA	GBR	GER	HUN	AUT	ITA	POR	MEX	AUS	141	1st
1986	Canon Williams Honda Team	Williams FW11	RA166E; 1.5 V6 t	G	(United Kingdom) Nigel Mansell	Ret	2^{F}	Ret	4	1	1^{P}	5	1^{F}	1^{F}	3	3	Ret	2	1^{F}	5	Ret^{P}	141	1st
1986	Canon Williams Honda Team	Williams FW11	RA166E; 1.5 V6 t	G	(Brazil) Nelson Piquet	1^{F}	Ret	2^{F}	7	Ret^{P}	3^{F}	Ret^{F}	3	2^{P}	1	1^{F}	Ret	1	3	4^{F}	2^{F}	141	1st
1987	Canon Williams Honda Team	Williams FW11B	RA167E; 1.5 V6 t	G		BRA	SMR	BEL	MON	DET	FRA	GBR	GER	HUN	AUT	ITA	POR	ESP	MEX	JPN	AUS	137	1st
1987	Canon Williams Honda Team	Williams FW11B	RA167E; 1.5 V6 t	G	(Brazil) Nelson Piquet	2^{F}	DNS	Ret	2	2	2^{F}	2^{P}	1	1^{F}	2^{P}	1^{P}	3	4^{P}	2^{F}	15^{†}	Ret	137	1st
1987	Canon Williams Honda Team	Williams FW11B	RA167E; 1.5 V6 t	G	(United Kingdom) Nigel Mansell	6^{P}	1	Ret^{P}	Ret^{P}	5^{P}	1^{P}	1^{F}	Ret^{P}^{F}	14^{P}^{†}	1^{F}	3	Ret	1	1^{P}	DNS		137	1st
1987	Canon Williams Honda Team	Williams FW11B	RA167E; 1.5 V6 t	G	(Italy) Riccardo Patrese																9^{†}	137	1st
1987	Camel Team Lotus Honda	Lotus 99T	RA167E; 1.5 V6 t	G	(Brazil) Ayrton Senna	Ret	2^{P}	Ret	1^{F}	1^{F}	4	3	3	2	5	2^{F}	7	5	Ret	2	DSQ	64	3rd
1987	Camel Team Lotus Honda	Lotus 99T	RA167E; 1.5 V6 t	G	(Japan) Satoru Nakajima	7	6^{†}	5	10	Ret	NC	4	Ret	Ret	13	11	8	9	Ret	6	Ret	64	3rd
1988	Honda Marlboro McLaren	McLaren MP4/4	RA168E; 1.5 V6 t	G		BRA	SMR	MON	MEX	CAN	DET	FRA	GBR	GER	HUN	BEL	ITA	POR	ESP	JPN	AUS	199	1st
1988	Honda Marlboro McLaren	McLaren MP4/4	RA168E; 1.5 V6 t	G	(France) Alain Prost	1	2^{F}	1	1^{F}	2	2^{F}	1^{P}^{F}	Ret	2	2^{F}	2	Ret	1^{P}	1^{F}	2	1^{F}	199	1st
1988	Honda Marlboro McLaren	McLaren MP4/4	RA168E; 1.5 V6 t	G	(Brazil) Ayrton Senna	DSQ^{P}	1^{P}	Ret^{P}^{F}	2^{P}	1^{P}^{F}	1^{P}	2	1	1^{P}	1^{P}	1^{P}	10^{P}^{†}	6	4^{P}	1^{P}^{F}	2^{P}	199	1st
1988	Camel Team Lotus Honda	Lotus 100T	RA168E; 1.5 V6 t	G	(Brazil) Nelson Piquet	3	3	Ret	Ret	4	Ret	5	5	Ret	8	4	Ret	Ret	8	Ret	3	23	4th
1988	Camel Team Lotus Honda	Lotus 100T	RA168E; 1.5 V6 t	G	(Japan) Satoru Nakajima	6	8	DNQ	Ret	11	DNQ	7	10	9	7	Ret	Ret	Ret	Ret	7	Ret	23	4th
1989	Honda Marlboro McLaren	McLaren MP4/5	RA109E; 3.5 V10	G		BRA	SMR	MON	MEX	USA	CAN	FRA	GBR	GER	HUN	BEL	ITA	POR	ESP	JPN	AUS	129 (141)	1st
1989	Honda Marlboro McLaren	McLaren MP4/5	RA109E; 3.5 V10	G	(Brazil) Ayrton Senna	11^{P}	1^{P}	1^{P}	1^{P}	Ret^{P}^{F}	7^{†}	Ret	Ret^{P}	1^{P}^{F}	2	1^{P}	Ret^{P}	Ret^{P}	1^{P}^{F}	DSQ^{P}	Ret^{P}	129 (141)	1st
1989	Honda Marlboro McLaren	McLaren MP4/5	RA109E; 3.5 V10	G	(France) Alain Prost	2	2^{F}	2^{F}	5	1	Ret^{P}	1^{P}	1	2	4	2^{F}	1^{F}	2	3	Ret^{F}	Ret	129 (141)	1st
1990	Honda Marlboro McLaren	McLaren MP4/5B	RA100E; 3.5 V10	G		USA	BRA	SMR	MON	CAN	MEX	FRA	GBR	GER	HUN	BEL	ITA	POR	ESP	JPN	AUS	121	1st
1990	Honda Marlboro McLaren	McLaren MP4/5B	RA100E; 3.5 V10	G	(Brazil) Ayrton Senna	1	3^{P}	Ret^{P}	1^{P}^{F}	1^{P}	20^{†}	3	3	1^{P}	2	1^{P}	1^{P}^{F}	2	Ret^{P}	Ret^{P}	Ret^{P}	121	1st
1990	Honda Marlboro McLaren	McLaren MP4/5B	RA100E; 3.5 V10	G	(Austria) Gerhard Berger	Ret^{P}^{F}	2^{F}	2	3	4^{F}	3^{P}	5	14^{†}	3	16^{†}	3	3	4	Ret	Ret	4	121	1st
1991	Honda Marlboro McLaren	McLaren MP4/6	RA121E; 3.5 V12	G		USA	BRA	SMR	MON	CAN	MEX	FRA	GBR	GER	HUN	BEL	ITA	POR	ESP	JPN	AUS	139	1st
1991	Honda Marlboro McLaren	McLaren MP4/6	RA121E; 3.5 V12	G	(Brazil) Ayrton Senna	1^{P}	1^{P}	1^{P}	1^{P}	Ret	3	3	4^{†}	7^{†}	1^{P}	1^{P}	2^{P}^{F}	2	5	2^{F}	1^{P}^{‡}	139	1st
1991	Honda Marlboro McLaren	McLaren MP4/6	RA121E; 3.5 V12	G	(Austria) Gerhard Berger	Ret	3	2^{F}	Ret	Ret	Ret	Ret	2	4	4	2	4	Ret	Ret^{P}	1^{P}	3^{F}^{‡}	139	1st
1991	Braun Tyrrell Honda	Tyrrell 020	RA101E; 3.5 V10	P	(Japan) Satoru Nakajima	5	Ret	Ret	Ret	10	12	Ret	8	Ret	15	Ret	Ret	13	17	Ret	Ret	12	6th
1991	Braun Tyrrell Honda	Tyrrell 020	RA101E; 3.5 V10	P	(Italy) Stefano Modena	4	Ret	Ret	Ret	2	11	Ret	7	13	12	Ret	Ret	Ret	16	6	10	12	6th
1992	Honda Marlboro McLaren	McLaren MP4/6B; McLaren MP4/7A	RA122E; 3.5 V12; RA122E/B; 3.5 V12	G		RSA	MEX	BRA	ESP	SMR	MON	CAN	FRA	GBR	GER	HUN	BEL	ITA	POR	JPN	AUS	99	2nd
1992	Honda Marlboro McLaren	McLaren MP4/6B; McLaren MP4/7A	RA122E; 3.5 V12; RA122E/B; 3.5 V12	G	(Brazil) Ayrton Senna	3	Ret	Ret	9^{†}	3	1	Ret^{P}	Ret	Ret	2	1	5	1	3^{F}	Ret	Ret	99	2nd
1992	Honda Marlboro McLaren	McLaren MP4/6B; McLaren MP4/7A	RA122E; 3.5 V12; RA122E/B; 3.5 V12	G	(Austria) Gerhard Berger	5	4^{F}	Ret	4	Ret	Ret	1^{F}	Ret	5	Ret	3	Ret	4	2	2	1	99	2nd
1993 – 1999: Honda did not supply engines to other teams. (Note: Mugen-Honda supplied engines in 1992-2000 and prepared their first engine for Tyrrell branded as Honda in 1991.) Source:

==== 2000–2008 ====
(key)

Year	Entrant	Chassis	Engine	Tyres	Drivers	1	2	3	4	5	6	7	8	9	10	11	12	13	14	15	16	17	18	19	Points	WCC
2000	Lucky Strike Reynard BAR Honda	BAR 002	RA000E; 3.0 V10	B		AUS	BRA	SMR	GBR	ESP	EUR	MON	CAN	FRA	AUT	GER	HUN	BEL	ITA	USA	JPN	MAL			20	5th
2000	Lucky Strike Reynard BAR Honda	BAR 002	RA000E; 3.0 V10	B	(Canada) Jacques Villeneuve	4	Ret	5	16	Ret	Ret	7	15	4	4	8	12	7	Ret	4	6	5			20	5th
2000	Lucky Strike Reynard BAR Honda	BAR 002	RA000E; 3.0 V10	B	(Brazil) Ricardo Zonta	6	9	12	Ret	8	Ret	Ret	8	Ret	Ret	Ret	14	12	6	6	9	Ret			20	5th
2001	B&H Jordan Honda	Jordan EJ11	RA001E; 3.0 V10	B		AUS	MAL	BRA	SMR	ESP	AUT	MON	CAN	EUR	FRA	GBR	GER	HUN	BEL	ITA	USA	JPN			19	5th
2001	B&H Jordan Honda	Jordan EJ11	RA001E; 3.0 V10	B	(Germany) Heinz-Harald Frentzen	5	4	11	6	Ret	Ret	Ret	PO	Ret	8	7									19	5th
2001	B&H Jordan Honda	Jordan EJ11	RA001E; 3.0 V10	B	(Brazil) Ricardo Zonta								7				Ret								19	5th
2001	B&H Jordan Honda	Jordan EJ11	RA001E; 3.0 V10	B	(France) Jean Alesi													10	6	8	7	Ret			19	5th
2001	B&H Jordan Honda	Jordan EJ11	RA001E; 3.0 V10	B	(Italy) Jarno Trulli	Ret	8	5	5	4	DSQ	Ret	11	Ret	5	Ret	Ret	Ret	Ret	Ret	4	8			19	5th
2001	Lucky Strike BAR Honda	BAR 003	RA001E; 3.0 V10	B	(France) Olivier Panis	7	Ret	4	8	7	5	Ret	Ret	Ret	9	Ret	7	Ret	11	9	11	13			17	6th
2001	Lucky Strike BAR Honda	BAR 003	RA001E; 3.0 V10	B	(Canada) Jacques Villeneuve	Ret	Ret	7	Ret	3	8	4	Ret	9	Ret	8	3	9	8	6	Ret	10			17	6th
2002	DHL Jordan Honda	Jordan EJ12	RA002E; 3.0 V10	B		AUS	MAL	BRA	SMR	ESP	AUT	MON	CAN	EUR	GBR	FRA	GER	HUN	BEL	ITA	USA	JPN			9	6th
2002	DHL Jordan Honda	Jordan EJ12	RA002E; 3.0 V10	B	(Italy) Giancarlo Fisichella	Ret	13	Ret	Ret	Ret	5	5	5	Ret	7	DNQ	Ret	6	Ret	8	7	Ret			9	6th
2002	DHL Jordan Honda	Jordan EJ12	RA002E; 3.0 V10	B	(Japan) Takuma Sato	Ret	9	9	Ret	Ret	Ret	Ret	10	16	Ret	Ret	8	10	11	12	11	5			9	6th
2002	Lucky Strike BAR Honda	BAR 004	RA002E; 3.0 V10	B	(Canada) Jacques Villeneuve	Ret	8	10	7	7	10	Ret	Ret	12	4	Ret	Ret	Ret	8	9	6	Ret			7	8th
2002	Lucky Strike BAR Honda	BAR 004	RA002E; 3.0 V10	B	(France) Olivier Panis	Ret	Ret	Ret	Ret	Ret	Ret	Ret	8	9	5	Ret	Ret	12	12	6	12	Ret			7	8th
2003	Lucky Strike BAR Honda	BAR 005	RA003E; 3.0 V10	B		AUS	MAL	BRA	SMR	ESP	AUT	MON	CAN	EUR	FRA	GBR	GER	HUN	ITA	USA	JPN				26	5th
2003	Lucky Strike BAR Honda	BAR 005	RA003E; 3.0 V10	B	(Canada) Jacques Villeneuve	9	DNS	6	Ret	Ret	12	Ret	Ret	Ret	9	10	9	Ret	6	Ret					26	5th
2003	Lucky Strike BAR Honda	BAR 005	RA003E; 3.0 V10	B	(Japan) Takuma Sato																6				26	5th
2003	Lucky Strike BAR Honda	BAR 005	RA003E; 3.0 V10	B	(United Kingdom) Jenson Button	10	7	Ret	8	9	4	DNS	Ret	7	Ret	8	8	10	Ret	Ret	4				26	5th
2004	Lucky Strike BAR Honda	BAR 006	RA004E; 3.0 V10	MI		AUS	MAL	BHR	SMR	ESP	MON	EUR	CAN	USA	FRA	GBR	GER	HUN	BEL	ITA	CHN	JPN	BRA		119	2nd
2004	Lucky Strike BAR Honda	BAR 006	RA004E; 3.0 V10	MI	(United Kingdom) Jenson Button	6	3	3	2^{P}	8	2	3	3	Ret	5	4	2	5	Ret	3	2	3	Ret		119	2nd
2004	Lucky Strike BAR Honda	BAR 006	RA004E; 3.0 V10	MI	(Japan) Takuma Sato	9	15	5	16	5	Ret	Ret	Ret	3	Ret	11	8	6	Ret	4	6	4	6		119	2nd
2005	Lucky Strike BAR Honda	BAR 007	RA005E; 3.0 V10	MI		AUS	MAL	BHR	SMR	ESP	MON	EUR	CAN	USA	FRA	GBR	GER	HUN	TUR	ITA	BEL	BRA	JPN	CHN	38	6th
2005	Lucky Strike BAR Honda	BAR 007	RA005E; 3.0 V10	MI	(United Kingdom) Jenson Button	11	Ret	Ret	DSQ			10	Ret^{P}	DNS	4	5	3	5	5	8	3	7	5	8	38	6th
2005	Lucky Strike BAR Honda	BAR 007	RA005E; 3.0 V10	MI	(Japan) Takuma Sato	14		Ret	DSQ			12	Ret	DNS	11	16	12	8	9	16	Ret	10	DSQ	Ret	38	6th
2005	Lucky Strike BAR Honda	BAR 007	RA005E; 3.0 V10	MI	(United Kingdom) Anthony Davidson		Ret																		38	6th
2006	Super Aguri F1 Team	Super Aguri SA05; Super Aguri SA06	RA806E; 2.4 V8	B		BHR	MAL	AUS	SMR	EUR	ESP	MON	GBR	CAN	USA	FRA	GER	HUN	TUR	ITA	CHN	JPN	BRA		0	11th
2006	Super Aguri F1 Team	Super Aguri SA05; Super Aguri SA06	RA806E; 2.4 V8	B	(Japan) Takuma Sato	18	14	12	Ret	Ret	17	Ret	17	15	Ret	Ret	Ret	13	NC	16	DSQ	15	10		0	11th
2006	Super Aguri F1 Team	Super Aguri SA05; Super Aguri SA06	RA806E; 2.4 V8	B	(Japan) Yuji Ide	Ret	Ret	13	Ret																0	11th
2006	Super Aguri F1 Team	Super Aguri SA05; Super Aguri SA06	RA806E; 2.4 V8	B	(France) Franck Montagny					Ret	Ret	16	18	Ret	Ret	16									0	11th
2006	Super Aguri F1 Team	Super Aguri SA05; Super Aguri SA06	RA806E; 2.4 V8	B	(Japan) Sakon Yamamoto												Ret	Ret	Ret	Ret	16	17	16		0	11th
2007	Super Aguri F1 Team	Super Aguri SA07	RA807E; 2.4 V8	B		AUS	MAL	BHR	ESP	MON	CAN	USA	FRA	GBR	EUR	HUN	TUR	ITA	BEL	JPN	CHN	BRA			4	9th
2007	Super Aguri F1 Team	Super Aguri SA07	RA807E; 2.4 V8	B	(Japan) Takuma Sato	12	13	Ret	8	17	6	Ret	16	14	Ret	15	18	16	15	15	14	12			4	9th
2007	Super Aguri F1 Team	Super Aguri SA07	RA807E; 2.4 V8	B	(United Kingdom) Anthony Davidson	16	16	16	11	18	11	11	Ret	Ret	12	Ret	14	14	16	Ret	Ret	14			4	9th
2008	Super Aguri F1 Team	Super Aguri SA08	RA808E; 2.4 V8	B		AUS	MAL	BHR	ESP	TUR	MON	CAN	FRA	GBR	GER	HUN	EUR	BEL	ITA	SIN	JPN	CHN	BRA		0	11th
2008	Super Aguri F1 Team	Super Aguri SA08	RA808E; 2.4 V8	B	(Japan) Takuma Sato	Ret	16	17	13																0	11th
2008	Super Aguri F1 Team	Super Aguri SA08	RA808E; 2.4 V8	B	(United Kingdom) Anthony Davidson	Ret	15	16	Ret																0	11th
2009 – 2014: Honda did not supply engines to other teams. Source:

==== 2015–2021 ====
(key)

Year	Entrant	Chassis	Engine	Tyres	Drivers	1	2	3	4	5	6	7	8	9	10	11	12	13	14	15	16	17	18	19	20	21	22	Points	WCC
2015	McLaren Honda	McLaren MP4-30	RA615H; 1.6 V6 t	P		AUS	MAL	CHN	BHR	ESP	MON	CAN	AUT	GBR	HUN	BEL	ITA	SIN	JPN	RUS	USA	MEX	BRA	ABU				27	9th
2015	McLaren Honda	McLaren MP4-30	RA615H; 1.6 V6 t	P	(Denmark) Kevin Magnussen	DNS																						27	9th
2015	McLaren Honda	McLaren MP4-30	RA615H; 1.6 V6 t	P	(Spain) Fernando Alonso		Ret	12	11	Ret	Ret	Ret	Ret	10	5	13	18^{†}	Ret	11	11	11	Ret	15	17				27	9th
2015	McLaren Honda	McLaren MP4-30	RA615H; 1.6 V6 t	P	(United Kingdom) Jenson Button	11	Ret	14	DNS	16	8	Ret	Ret	Ret	9	14	14	Ret	16	9	6	14	14	12				27	9th
2016	McLaren Honda	McLaren MP4-31	RA616H; 1.6 V6 t	P		AUS	BHR	CHN	RUS	ESP	MON	CAN	EUR	AUT	GBR	HUN	GER	BEL	ITA	SIN	MAL	JPN	USA	MEX	BRA	ABU		76	6th
2016	McLaren Honda	McLaren MP4-31	RA616H; 1.6 V6 t	P	(Spain) Fernando Alonso	Ret		12	6	Ret	5	11	Ret	18^{†}	13	7	12	7	14^{F}	7	7	16	5	13	10	10		76	6th
2016	McLaren Honda	McLaren MP4-31	RA616H; 1.6 V6 t	P	(Belgium) Stoffel Vandoorne		10																					76	6th
2016	McLaren Honda	McLaren MP4-31	RA616H; 1.6 V6 t	P	(United Kingdom) Jenson Button	14	Ret	13	10	9	9	Ret	11	6	12	Ret	8	Ret	12	Ret	9	18	9	12	16	Ret		76	6th
2017	McLaren Honda	McLaren MCL32	RA617H; 1.6 V6 t	P		AUS	CHN	BHR	RUS	ESP	MON	CAN	AZE	AUT	GBR	HUN	BEL	ITA	SIN	MAL	JPN	USA	MEX	BRA	ABU			30	9th
2017	McLaren Honda	McLaren MCL32	RA617H; 1.6 V6 t	P	(Belgium) Stoffel Vandoorne	13	Ret	DNS	14	Ret	Ret	14	12	12	11	10	14	Ret	7	7	14	12	12	Ret	12			30	9th
2017	McLaren Honda	McLaren MCL32	RA617H; 1.6 V6 t	P	(Spain) Fernando Alonso	Ret	Ret	14^{†}	DNS	12		16^{†}	9	Ret	Ret	6^{F}	Ret	17^{†}	Ret	11	11	Ret	10	8	9			30	9th
2017	McLaren Honda	McLaren MCL32	RA617H; 1.6 V6 t	P	(United Kingdom) Jenson Button						Ret																	30	9th
2018	Red Bull Toro Rosso Honda	Scuderia Toro Rosso STR13	RA618H; 1.6 V6 t	P		AUS	BHR	CHN	AZE	ESP	MON	CAN	FRA	AUT	GBR	GER	HUN	BEL	ITA	SIN	RUS	JPN	USA	MEX	BRA	ABU		33	9th
2018	Red Bull Toro Rosso Honda	Scuderia Toro Rosso STR13	RA618H; 1.6 V6 t	P	(France) Pierre Gasly	Ret	4	18	12	Ret	7	11	Ret	Ret	13	14	6	9	14	13	Ret	11	12	10	13	Ret		33	9th
2018	Red Bull Toro Rosso Honda	Scuderia Toro Rosso STR13	RA618H; 1.6 V6 t	P	(New Zealand) Brendon Hartley	15	17	20^{†}	10	12	19^{†}	Ret	14	11	Ret	10	11	14	Ret	17	Ret	13	9	14	11	12		33	9th
2019	Aston Martin Red Bull Racing	Red Bull Racing RB15	RA619H; 1.6 V6 t	P		AUS	BHR	CHN	AZE	ESP	MON	CAN	FRA	AUT	GBR	GER	HUN	BEL	ITA	SIN	RUS	JPN	MEX	USA	BRA	ABU		417	3rd
2019	Aston Martin Red Bull Racing	Red Bull Racing RB15	RA619H; 1.6 V6 t	P	(France) Pierre Gasly	11	8	6^{F}	Ret	6	5^{F}	8	10	7	4	14^{†}	6											417	3rd
2019	Aston Martin Red Bull Racing	Red Bull Racing RB15	RA619H; 1.6 V6 t	P	(Thailand) Alexander Albon													5	6	6	5	4	5	5	14	6		417	3rd
2019	Aston Martin Red Bull Racing	Red Bull Racing RB15	RA619H; 1.6 V6 t	P	(Netherlands) Max Verstappen	3	4	4	4	3	4	5	4	1^{F}	5	1^{F}	2^{P}^{F}	Ret	8	3	4	Ret	6	3	1^{P}	2		417	3rd
2019	Red Bull Toro Rosso Honda	Scuderia Toro Rosso STR14	RA619H; 1.6 V6 t	P	(Thailand) Alexander Albon	14	9	10	11	11	8	Ret	15	15	12	6	10											85	6th
2019	Red Bull Toro Rosso Honda	Scuderia Toro Rosso STR14	RA619H; 1.6 V6 t	P	(France) Pierre Gasly													9	11	8	14	7	9	16^{†}	2	18		85	6th
2019	Red Bull Toro Rosso Honda	Scuderia Toro Rosso STR14	RA619H; 1.6 V6 t	P	(Russia) Daniil Kvyat	10	12	Ret	Ret	9	7	10	14	17	9	3	15	7	Ret	15	12	10	11	12	10	9		85	6th
2020	Aston Martin Red Bull Racing	Red Bull Racing RB16	RA620H; 1.6 V6 t	P		AUT	STY	HUN	GBR	70A	ESP	BEL	ITA	TUS	RUS	EIF	POR	EMI	TUR	BHR	SKH	ABU						319	2nd
2020	Aston Martin Red Bull Racing	Red Bull Racing RB16	RA620H; 1.6 V6 t	P	(Thailand) Alexander Albon	13†	4	5	8	5	8	6	15	3	10	Ret	12	15	7	3	6	4						319	2nd
2020	Aston Martin Red Bull Racing	Red Bull Racing RB16	RA620H; 1.6 V6 t	P	(Netherlands) Max Verstappen	Ret	3	2	2^{F}	1	2	3	Ret	Ret	2	2^{F}	3	Ret	6	2^{F}	Ret	1^{P}						319	2nd
2020	Scuderia AlphaTauri Honda	AlphaTauri AT01	RA620H; 1.6 V6 t	P	(France) Pierre Gasly	7	15	Ret	7	11	9	8	1	Ret	9	6	5	Ret	13	6	11	8						107	7th
2020	Scuderia AlphaTauri Honda	AlphaTauri AT01	RA620H; 1.6 V6 t	P	(Russia) Daniil Kvyat	12†	10	12	Ret	10	12	11	9	7	8	15	19	4	12	11	7	11						107	7th
2021	Red Bull Racing Honda	Red Bull Racing RB16B	RA621H; 1.6 V6 t	P		BHR	EMI	POR	ESP	MON	AZE	FRA	STY	AUT	GBR	HUN	BEL	NED	ITA	RUS	TUR	USA	MXC	SAP	QAT	SAU	ABU	585.5	2nd
2021	Red Bull Racing Honda	Red Bull Racing RB16B	RA621H; 1.6 V6 t	P	(Mexico) Sergio Pérez	5	11	4	5	4	1	3	4	6	16^{F}	Ret	19	8	5	9	3	3	3	4^{F}	4	Ret	15†	585.5	2nd
2021	Red Bull Racing Honda	Red Bull Racing RB16B	RA621H; 1.6 V6 t	P	(Netherlands) Max Verstappen	2^{P}	1	2	2^{F}	1	18†^{F}	1^{P}^{F}	1^{P}	1^{P}^{F}	Ret^{1 P}	9	1^{P}^{‡}	1^{P}	Ret^{2 P}	2	2	1^{P}	1	2^{2}	2^{F}	2	1^{P}^{F}	585.5	2nd
2021	Scuderia AlphaTauri Honda	AlphaTauri AT02	RA621H; 1.6 V6 t	P	(France) Pierre Gasly	17†	7	10	10	6	3	7	Ret	9	11	5^{F}	6^{‡}	4	Ret	13	6	Ret	4	7	11	6	5	142	6th
2021	Scuderia AlphaTauri Honda	AlphaTauri AT02	RA621H; 1.6 V6 t	P	(Japan) Yuki Tsunoda	9	12	15	Ret	16	7	13	10	12	10	6	15	Ret	DNS	17	14	9	Ret	15	13	14	4	142	6th

==== As Honda RBPT (2023–2025) ====
(key)

Year	Entrant	Chassis	Engine	Tyres	Drivers	1	2	3	4	5	6	7	8	9	10	11	12	13	14	15	16	17	18	19	20	21	22	23	24	Points	WCC
2023	Oracle Red Bull Racing	Red Bull Racing RB19	RBPTH001; 1.6 V6 t	P		BHR	SAU	AUS	AZE	MIA	MON	ESP	CAN	AUT	GBR	HUN	BEL	NED	ITA	SIN	JPN	QAT	USA	MXC	SAP	LVG	ABU			860	1st
2023	Oracle Red Bull Racing	Red Bull Racing RB19	RBPTH001; 1.6 V6 t	P	(Mexico) Sergio Pérez	2	1^{P}	5^{F}	1^{1}	2^{P}	16	4	6^{F}	3^{2}	6	3	2	4	2	8	Ret	10	4^{5}	Ret	4^{3}	3	4			860	1st
2023	Oracle Red Bull Racing	Red Bull Racing RB19	RBPTH001; 1.6 V6 t	P	(Netherlands) Max Verstappen	1^{P}	2^{F}	1^{P}	2^{3}	1^{F}	1^{P}	1^{P}^{F}	1^{P}	1^{P 1 F}	1^{P}^{F}	1^{F}	1^{1}	1^{P}	1	5	1^{P}^{F}	1^{P 2 F}	1^{1}	1	1^{P 1}	1	1^{P}^{F}			860	1st
2023	Scuderia AlphaTauri	AlphaTauri AT04	RBPTH001; 1.6 V6 t	P	(Netherlands) Nyck de Vries	14	14	15†	Ret	18	12	14	18	17	17															25	8th
2023	Scuderia AlphaTauri	AlphaTauri AT04	RBPTH001; 1.6 V6 t	P	(Australia) Daniel Ricciardo											13	16	WD					15	7	13	14	11			25	8th
2023	Scuderia AlphaTauri	AlphaTauri AT04	RBPTH001; 1.6 V6 t	P	(New Zealand) Liam Lawson													13	11	9	11	17								25	8th
2023	Scuderia AlphaTauri	AlphaTauri AT04	RBPTH001; 1.6 V6 t	P	(Japan) Yuki Tsunoda	11	11	10	10	11	15	12	14	19	16	15	10	15	DNS	Ret	12	15	8^{F}	12	9^{6}	18†	8			25	8th
2024	Oracle Red Bull Racing	Red Bull Racing RB20	RBPTH002; 1.6 V6 t	P		BHR	SAU	AUS	JPN	CHN	MIA	EMI	MON	CAN	ESP	AUT	GBR	HUN	BEL	NED	ITA	AZE	SIN	USA	MXC	SAP	LVG	QAT	ABU	589	3rd
2024	Oracle Red Bull Racing	Red Bull Racing RB20	RBPTH002; 1.6 V6 t	P	(Mexico) Sergio Pérez	2	2	5	2	3^{3}	4^{3}	8	Ret	Ret	8	7^{8}	17	7	7^{F}	6	8	17†	10	7	17	11^{8}	10	Ret	Ret	589	3rd
2024	Oracle Red Bull Racing	Red Bull Racing RB20	RBPTH002; 1.6 V6 t	P	(Netherlands) Max Verstappen	1^{P}^{F}	1^{P}	Ret^{P}	1^{P}^{F}	1^{1 P}	2^{1 P}	1^{P}	6	1	1	5^{1 P}	2	5	4	2	6	5	2	3^{1}	6	1^{4 F}	5	1^{8}	6	589	3rd
2024	Visa Cash App RB F1 Team	RB VCARB 01	RBPTH002; 1.6 V6 t	P	(Australia) Daniel Ricciardo	13	16	12	Ret	Ret	15^{4}	13	12	8	15	9	13	12	10	12	13	13	18^{F}							46	8th
2024	Visa Cash App RB F1 Team	RB VCARB 01	RBPTH002; 1.6 V6 t	P	(New Zealand) Liam Lawson																			9	16	9	16	14	17†	46	8th
2024	Visa Cash App RB F1 Team	RB VCARB 01	RBPTH002; 1.6 V6 t	P	(Japan) Yuki Tsunoda	14	15	7	10	Ret	7^{8}	10	8	14	19	14	10	9	16	17	Ret	Ret	12	14	Ret	7	9	13	12	46	8th
2025	Oracle Red Bull Racing	Red Bull Racing RB21	RBPTH003; 1.6 V6 t	P		AUS	CHN	JPN	BHR	SAU	MIA	EMI	MON	ESP	CAN	AUT	GBR	BEL	HUN	NED	ITA	AZE	SIN	USA	MXC	SAP	LVG	QAT	ABU	451	3rd
2025	Oracle Red Bull Racing	Red Bull Racing RB21	RBPTH003; 1.6 V6 t	P	(New Zealand) Liam Lawson	Ret	12																							451	3rd
2025	Oracle Red Bull Racing	Red Bull Racing RB21	RBPTH003; 1.6 V6 t	P	(Japan) Yuki Tsunoda			12	9	Ret	10^{6}	10	17	13	12	16	15	13	17	9	13	6	12	7^{7}	11	17	12	10^{5}	14	451	3rd
2025	Oracle Red Bull Racing	Red Bull Racing RB21	RBPTH003; 1.6 V6 t	P	(Netherlands) Max Verstappen	2	4^{3}	1^{P}	6	2^{P}	4^{P}	1^{F}	4	10	2	Ret	5^{P}	4^{1}	9	2	1^{P}	1^{P}^{F}	2	1^{1 P}	3	3^{4}	1^{F}	1^{4}	1^{P}	451	3rd
2025	Visa Cash App Racing Bulls F1 Team	Racing Bulls VCARB 02	RBPTH003; 1.6 V6 t	P	(France) Isack Hadjar	DNS	11	8	13	10	11	9	6	7	16	12	Ret	20^{8}	11	3	10	10	11	16	13	8	6	18†	17	92	6th
2025	Visa Cash App Racing Bulls F1 Team	Racing Bulls VCARB 02	RBPTH003; 1.6 V6 t	P	(Japan) Yuki Tsunoda	12	16^{6}																							92	6th
2025	Visa Cash App Racing Bulls F1 Team	Racing Bulls VCARB 02	RBPTH003; 1.6 V6 t	P	(New Zealand) Liam Lawson			17	16	12	Ret	14	8	11	Ret	6	Ret	8	8	12	14	5	15	11	Ret	7	14	9	18	92	6th

==== 2026–present ====
(key)

Year	Entrant	Chassis	Engine	Tyres	Drivers	1	2	3	4	5	6	7	8	9	10	11	12	13	14	15	16	17	18	19	20	21	22	23	Points	WCC
2026	Aston Martin Aramco F1 Team	Aston Martin AMR26	RA626H 1.6 V6 t	P		AUS	CHN	JPN	MIA	CAN	MON	BCN	AUT	GBR	BEL	HUN	NED	ITA	ESP	AZE	BHR	SIN	USA	MXC	SAP	LVG	QAT	ABU	3*	10th*
2026	Aston Martin Aramco F1 Team	Aston Martin AMR26	RA626H 1.6 V6 t	P	(Spain) Fernando Alonso	Ret	Ret	18	15	Ret	10	Ret	18	18	19	14	9												3*	10th*
2026	Aston Martin Aramco F1 Team	Aston Martin AMR26	RA626H 1.6 V6 t	P	(Canada) Lance Stroll	NC	Ret	Ret	17	15	Ret	Ret	Ret	19	Ret	13	Ret												3*	10th*

Notes

- * – Season still in progress.
- ^{†} – Driver failed to finish the race, but was classified as they had completed greater than 90% of the race distance.
- ^{‡} – Half points awarded as less than 75% of the race distance was completed.

== Non-championship Formula One results ==
(key)

Year	Entrant	Chassis	Engine	Driver	Tyres	1	2	3	4	5	6
1967	Honda R & D Company	Honda RA273	RA273E; 3.0 V12		F	ROC	SPC	INT	SYR	OUL	ESP
1967	Honda R & D Company	Honda RA273	RA273E; 3.0 V12	(United Kingdom) John Surtees	F	Ret	3				
