= Honda RA273 =

Formula One racing car

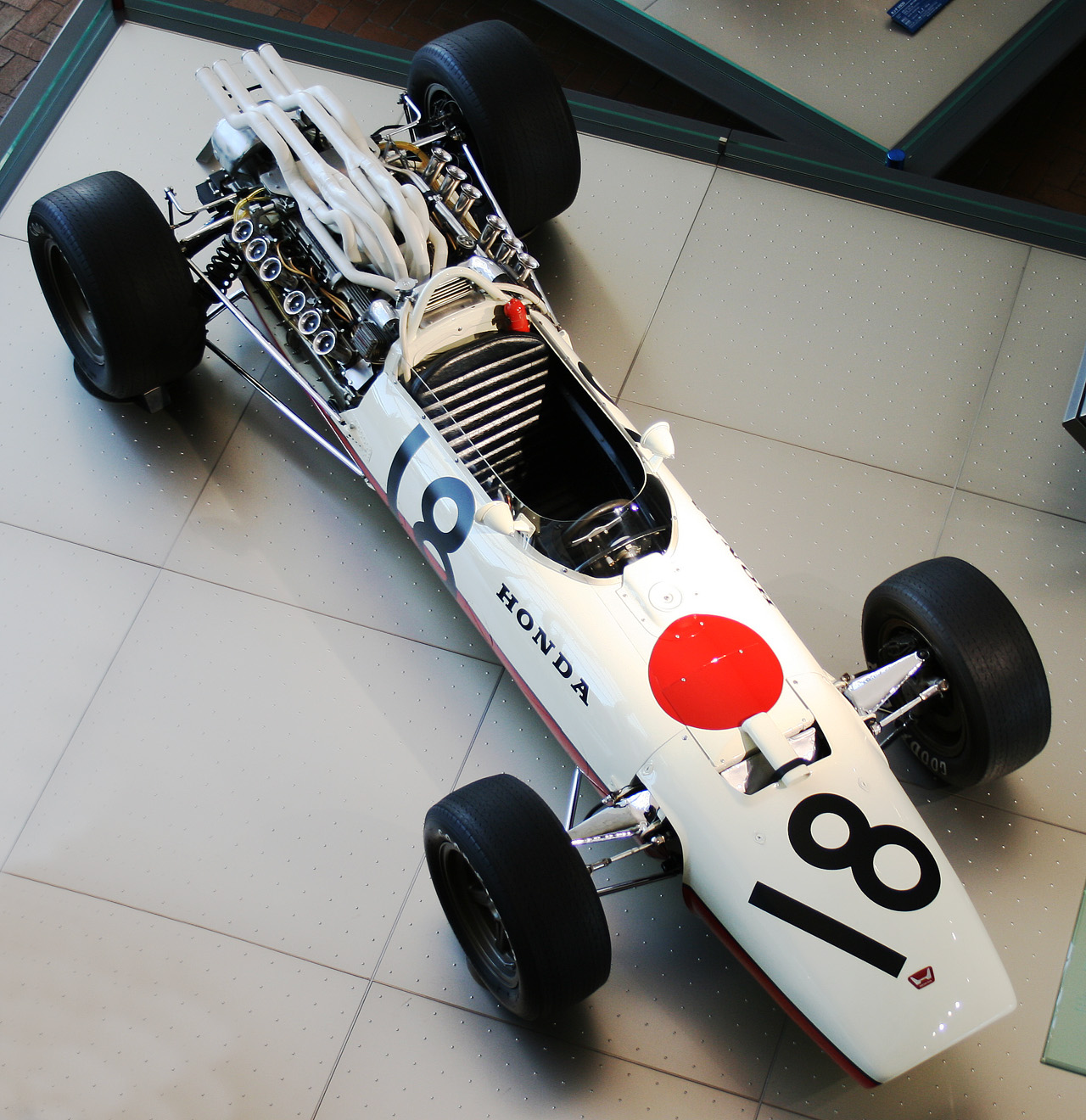
- Richie Ginther's 1966 Italian Grand Prix-spec RA273 in 2008
- Category: Formula One
- Constructor: Honda
- Predecessor: RA272
- Successor: RA300

Technical specifications
- Engine: Honda RA273E 3 Litre V12
- Tyres: Goodyear (1966); Firestone (1967)

Competition history
- Notable entrants: Honda Racing
- Notable drivers: (United States) Richie Ginther (United States) Ronnie Bucknum (United Kingdom) John Surtees
- Debut: 1966 Italian Grand Prix
- Last event: 1967 German Grand Prix
Races	Wins	Podiums	Poles	F/Laps
9	0	1	0	1
- Unless otherwise stated, all data refer to Formula One World Championship Grands Prix only.

The Honda RA273 was a Formula One racing car used by the Honda team in the 1966 and 1967 Formula One seasons.

The engine was re-designed from the RA272's 1,500cc V12 to a brand new 3,000cc V12 due to the change of regulations before the 1966 season. The new engine was designed by Shoichiro Irimajiri.

== Formula One World Championship results ==
(key) (Races in italics indicate fastest lap)

Year	Entrant	Engines	Drivers	Tyres	1	2	3	4	5	6	7	8	9	10	11	WDC	Pts.
1966	Honda R & D Company	Honda V12		G	MON	BEL	FRA	GBR	NED	GER	ITA	USA	MEX			3	8th
1966	Honda R & D Company	Honda V12	Ronnie Bucknum	G								Ret	8			3	8th
1966	Honda R & D Company	Honda V12	Richie Ginther	G							Ret	NC	4			3	8th
1967	Honda R & D Company	Honda V12		F	RSA	MON	NED	BEL	FRA	GBR	GER	CAN	ITA	USA	MEX	20^{1}	4th
1967	Honda R & D Company	Honda V12	John Surtees	F	3	Ret	Ret	Ret		6	4					20^{1}	4th

^{1} Only 8 of the 20 points were scored with the Honda RA273; the remainder were scored with the Honda RA300

== Non-Championship Formula One results ==
(key)

Year	Entrant	Engine	Driver	Tyres	1	2	3	4	5	6
1967	Honda R & D Company	Honda V12		F	ROC	SPC	INT	SYR	OUL	ESP
1967	Honda R & D Company	Honda V12	John Surtees	F	Ret	3				
