= Honda RA300 =

Formula One racing car

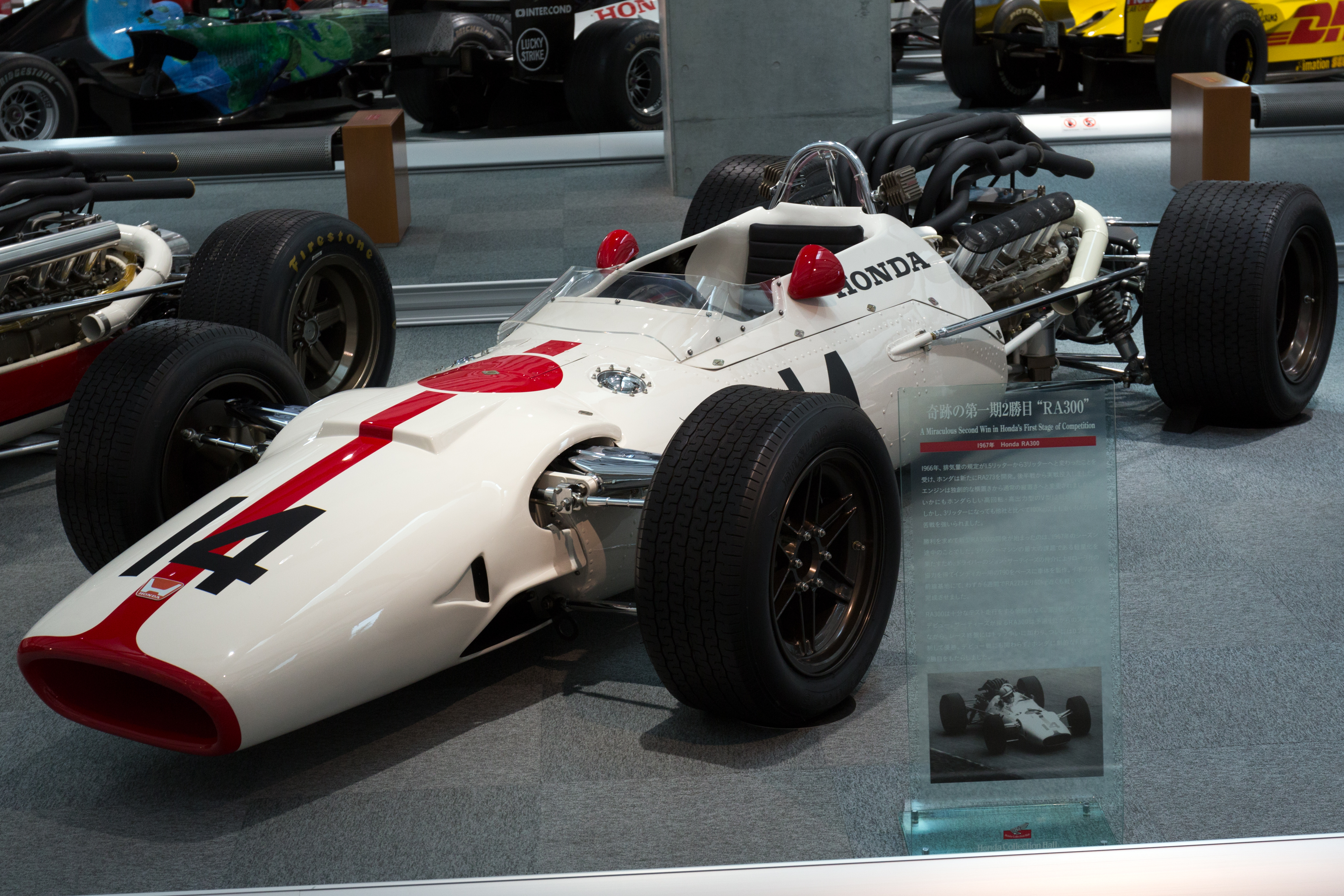
- The RA300 of John Surtees on display at the Honda Collection Hall in 2013
- Category: Formula One
- Constructor: Honda R&D
- Designers: Eric Broadley (Lola Cars); John Surtees (Honda); Yoshio Nakamura (Honda); Shoichi Sano (Honda)
- Predecessor: RA273
- Successor: RA301

Technical specifications
- Chassis: Aluminium monocoque
- Engine: Honda RA273E, 2991cc V12 naturally aspirated, mid-engined, longitudinally mounted
- Transmission: Honda 5-speed manual
- Fuel: BP/Shell
- Tyres: Firestone

Competition history
- Notable entrants: Honda Racing
- Notable drivers: (United Kingdom) John Surtees
- Debut: 1967 Italian Grand Prix
- First win: 1967 Italian Grand Prix
- Last win: 1967 Italian Grand Prix
- Last event: 1968 South African Grand Prix
Races	Wins	Podiums	Poles	F/Laps
4	1	1	0	0
- Constructors' Championships: 0
- Drivers' Championships: 0
- Unless otherwise stated, all data refer to Formula One World Championship Grands Prix only.

The Honda RA300 was a Formula One racing car produced by Honda Racing, and introduced towards the end of the 1967 Formula One season. It retained the same V12 engine as the preceding RA273 car, but the chassis was designed by Lola's Eric Broadley thanks to Honda driver John Surtees' experiences driving a Lola T70 in the Can-Am championship. The new chassis was based on a previous Lola Indianapolis 500 car, the T90. Internally, Lola designated the RA300 the T130. This collaboration resulted in the machine quickly being dubbed the "Hondola" by the motorsports press.

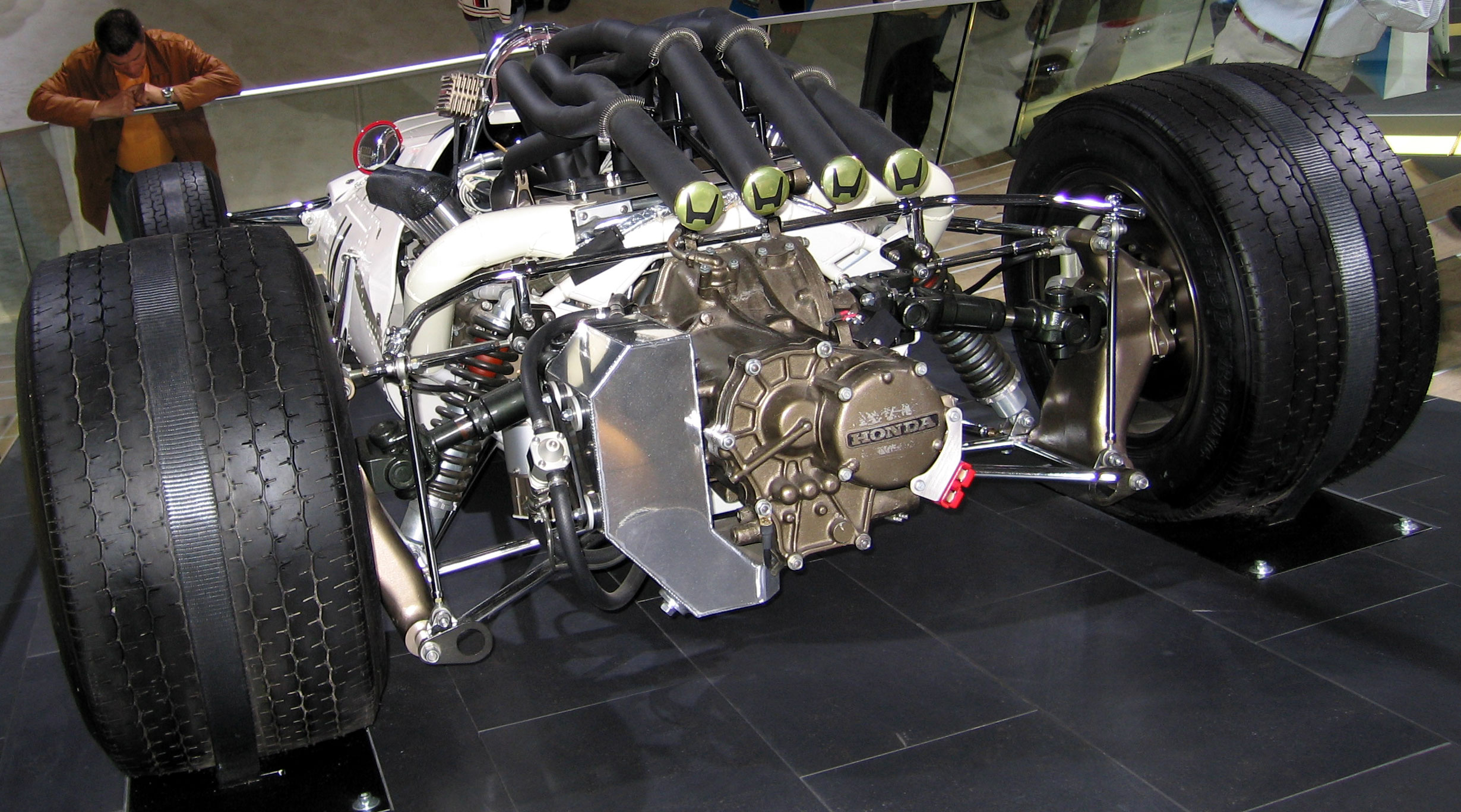
Rear view showing "waterfall" exhaust array.

Broadley's chassis was much lighter and sweeter-handling than the in-house RA273. The car initially performed impressively, winning in its first-ever World Championship race, the Italian Grand Prix at Monza. Driver John Surtees took the lead from Jim Clark's Lotus and Jack Brabham's Brabham on the final lap, after Clark ran out of fuel and Brabham ran wide. However, the RA300 flattered to deceive, and this would turn out to be the only lap that the car would lead. It remains the only F1 car ever to take its single victory in its first Grand Prix, and on the only lap it would ever lead.

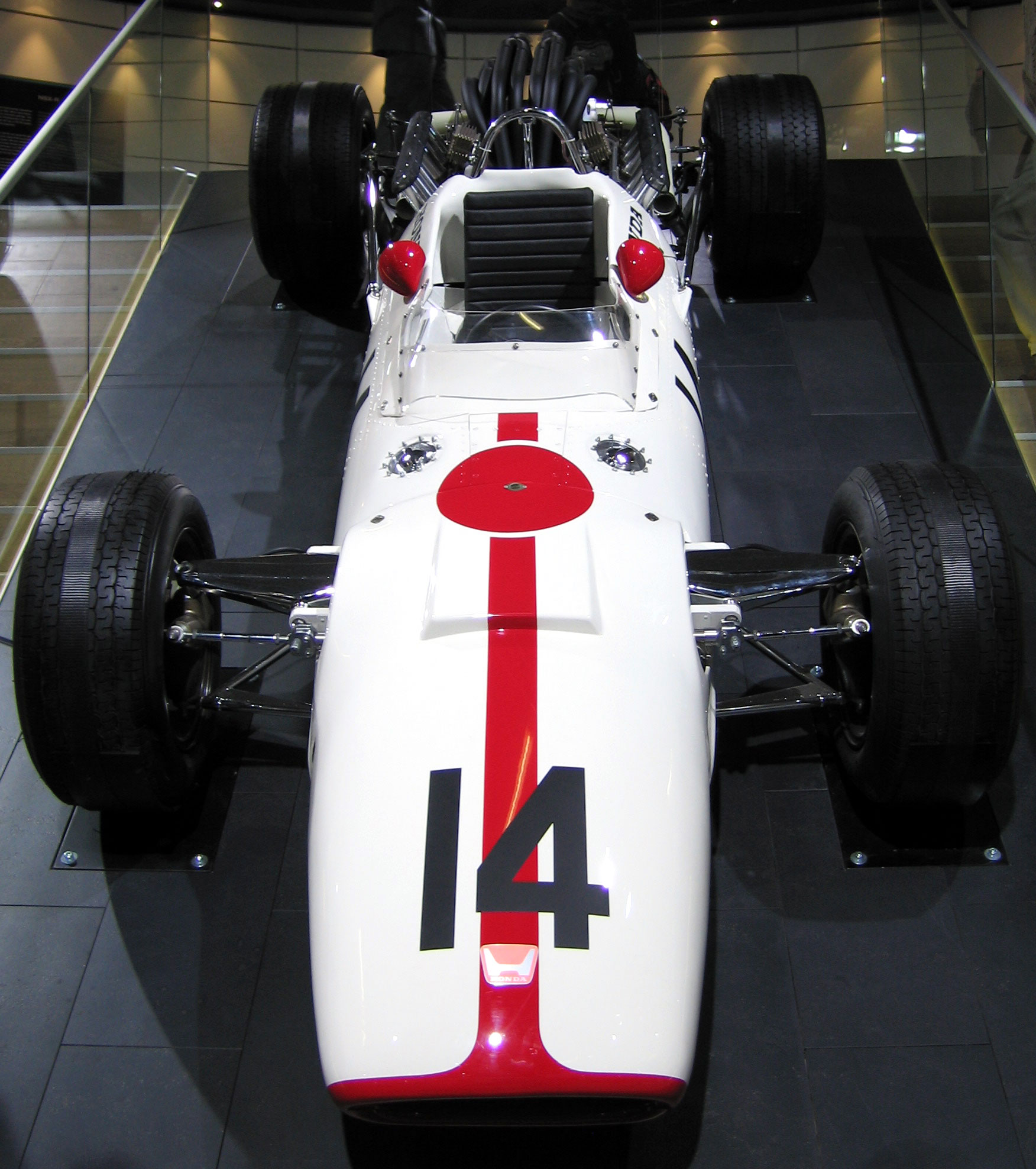
On display at the IAA exhibition in Frankfurt, 2007.

Honda continued with the RA300 for the remainder of the 1967 season, Surtees finishing fourth at the final race in Mexico. The car was then raced one last time at the opening race of the 1968 season in South Africa, Surtees finishing eighth, before being superseded by the RA301, a design closely based on the RA300.

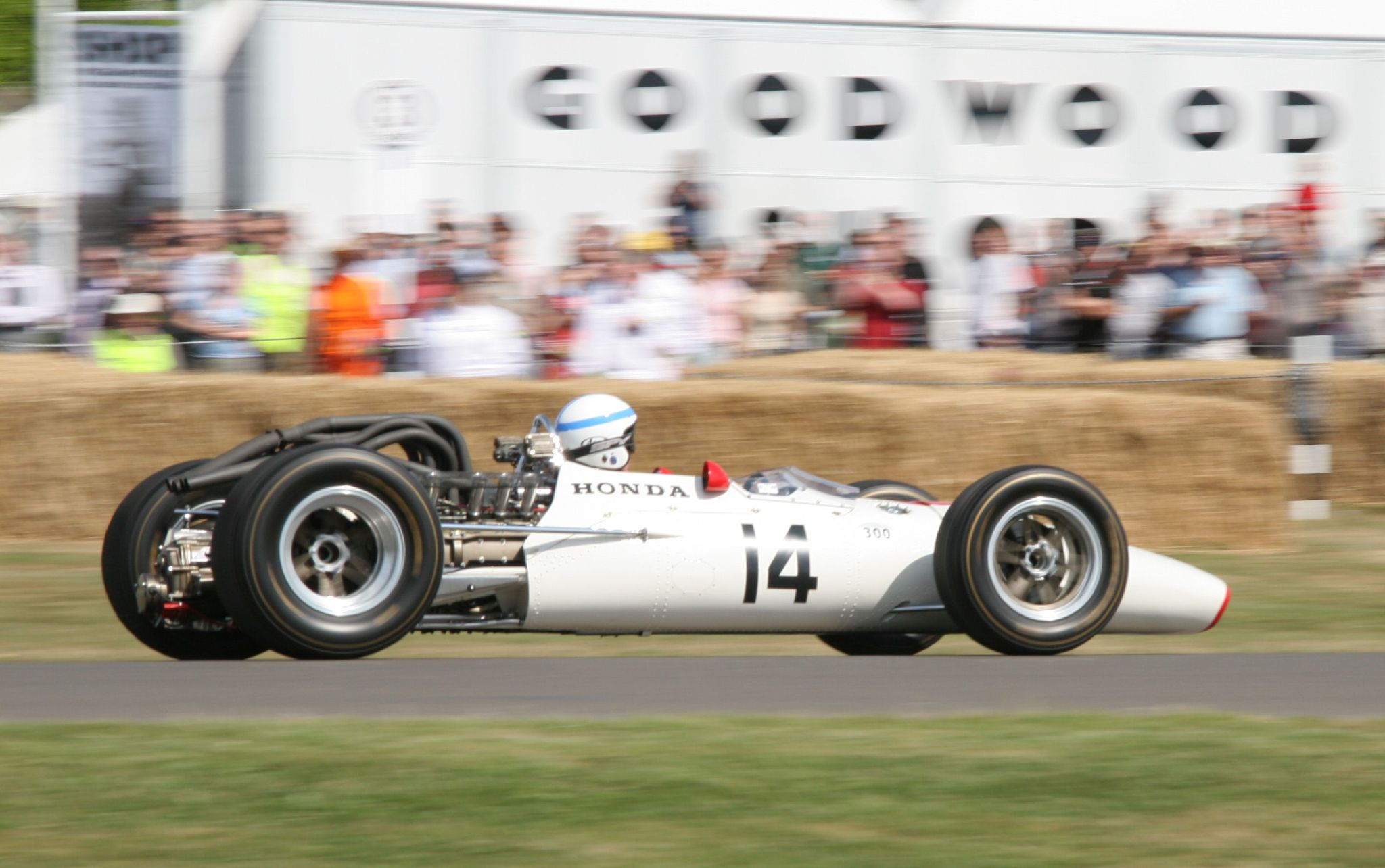
The RA300 being driven at Goodwood in 2006.

The 48-valve V12 engine first appeared in the RA273 at the 1966 Italian Grand Prix, driven by Richie Ginther. In spite of weighing 740 kg (dry), it was capable of spinning the rear tyres at 100 mph in third gear. With cylinder dimensions of 78.0 x 52.2 mm and a displacement of 2,993.17 cc, a target of 400-440 bhp at 12,000 rpm was quoted. The engine used by Surtees at Monza in 1967 was quoted by Motoring News as developing only 396 bhp, but with improved torque and response. Honda quotes the 1967 RA300 as producing "over 420 PS" (414 bhp) at 11,500rpm. The vehicle weight excess over the 500 kg minimum was more than halved, with Honda quoting a weight of 590 kg (1,301 lb) – some sources state 610 kg (1,345 lb) – whereas the RA273 had been 740 kg (1,631 lb), or nearly fifty percent overweight.

== Formula One World Championship results ==
(key) (results in bold indicate pole position; results in italics indicate fastest lap)

Year	Entrant	Engine	Tyres	Driver	1	2	3	4	5	6	7	8	9	10	11	12	Points	WCC
1967	Honda Racing	Honda V12	**F**		RSA	MON	NED	BEL	FRA	GBR	GER	CAN	ITA	USA	MEX		**20^{1}**	**4th**
1967	Honda Racing	Honda V12	**F**	John Surtees									1	Ret	4		**20^{1}**	**4th**
1968	Honda Racing	Honda V12	**F**		RSA	ESP	MON	BEL	NED	FRA	GBR	GER	ITA	CAN	USA	MEX	**14^{2}**	**6th**
1968	Honda Racing	Honda V12	**F**	John Surtees	8												**14^{2}**	**6th**

^{1} Includes 8 points scored using the Honda RA273.
^{2} All 14 points scored using the Honda RA301.
