= John Surtees =

British racing driver and motorcycle road racer (1934–2017)

John Surtees CBE
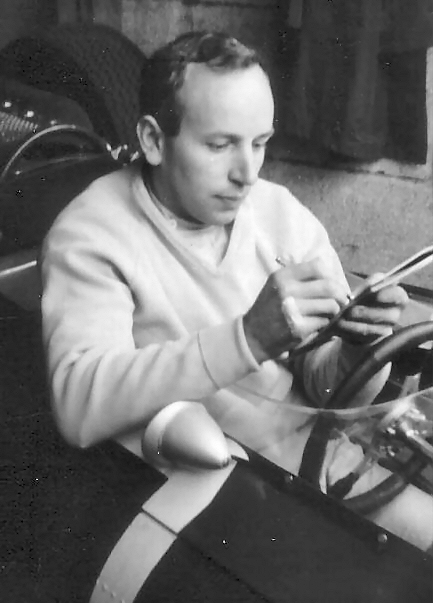
- Surtees at the 1964 British Grand Prix
- Born: John Norman Surtees; 11 February 1934; Tatsfield, Surrey, England
- Died: 10 March 2017 (aged 83); Tooting, London, England
- Spouses: Patricia Burke (m. 1962; div. 1979) Janis Sheara (m. 1979; div. 1982) Jane Sparrow (m. 1987)
- Children: 3, including Henry
Motorcycle racing career statistics
Grand Prix motorcycle racing
Active years	1952–1960
First race	1952 500cc Ulster Grand Prix
Last race	1960 500cc Nations Grand Prix
First win	1955 250cc Ulster Grand Prix
Last win	1960 500cc Nations Grand Prix
Team(s)	Norton, EMC, NSU, BMW, MV Agusta
Championships	350cc – 1958, 1959, 1960; 500cc – 1956, 1958, 1959, 1960
Starts / Wins / Podiums / Poles / F. laps / Points; 68 / 38 / 45 / N/A / 34 / 350

Formula One World Championship career
- Nationality: (United Kingdom) British
- Active years: 1960–1972
- Team(s): Lotus, Parnell, Ferrari, Cooper, Honda, BRM, Surtees
- Entries: 113 (111 starts)
- Championships: 1 (1964)
- Wins: 6
- Podiums: 24
- Career points: 180
- Pole positions: 8
- Fastest laps: 10
- First entry: 1960 Monaco Grand Prix
- First win: 1963 German Grand Prix
- Last win: 1967 Italian Grand Prix
- Last entry: 1972 Italian Grand Prix

24 Hours of Le Mans career
- Years: 1963–1965, 1967
- Teams: Ferrari, Lola
- Best finish: 3rd (1964)
- Class wins: 0

John Norman Surtees (11 February 1934 – 10 March 2017) was a British racing driver and motorcycle road racer who competed in Grand Prix motorcycle racing from 1952 to 1960, and Formula One from 1960 to 1972. Surtees was a seven-time Grand Prix motorcycle World Champion, with four titles in the premier 500cc class with MV Agusta. Surtees won the Formula One World Drivers' Championship in 1964 with Ferrari, and remains the only driver to win World Championships on both two- and four-wheels; he won 38 motorcycle Grands Prix and six Formula One Grands Prix.

On his way to become a seven-time Grand Prix motorcycle World Champion, Surtees won his first title in 1956, and followed with three consecutive doubles between 1958 and 1960, winning six World Championships in both the 500 and 350cc classes. Surtees then made the move to the pinnacle of four-wheeled motorsport, the Formula One World Championship, and in 1964 made motor racing history by becoming the Formula One World Champion. He founded the Surtees Racing Organisation team that competed as a constructor in Formula One, Formula 2 and Formula 5000 from 1970 to 1978. He was also the ambassador of the Racing Steps Foundation.

== Motorcycle racing career ==
Surtees was the son of a south-London motorcycle dealer. His father Jack Surtees was an accomplished grasstrack competitor and in 1948 was the South Eastern Centre Sidecar Champion. He had his first professional outing, which they won, in the sidecar of his father's Vincent at the age of 14. However, when race officials discovered Surtees's age, they were disqualified. He entered his first race at 15 in a grasstrack competition. In 1950, at the age of 16, he went to work for the Vincent factory as an apprentice. He first gained prominence in 1951 when he gave Norton star Geoff Duke a strong challenge in an ACU race at the Thruxton Circuit.

In 1955, Norton race chief Joe Craig gave Surtees his first factory-sponsored ride aboard the Nortons. He finished the year by beating reigning world champion Duke at Silverstone and then at Brands Hatch. However, with Norton in financial trouble and uncertain about their racing plans, Surtees accepted an offer to race for the MV Agusta factory racing team, where he soon earned the nickname figlio del vento (son of the wind).

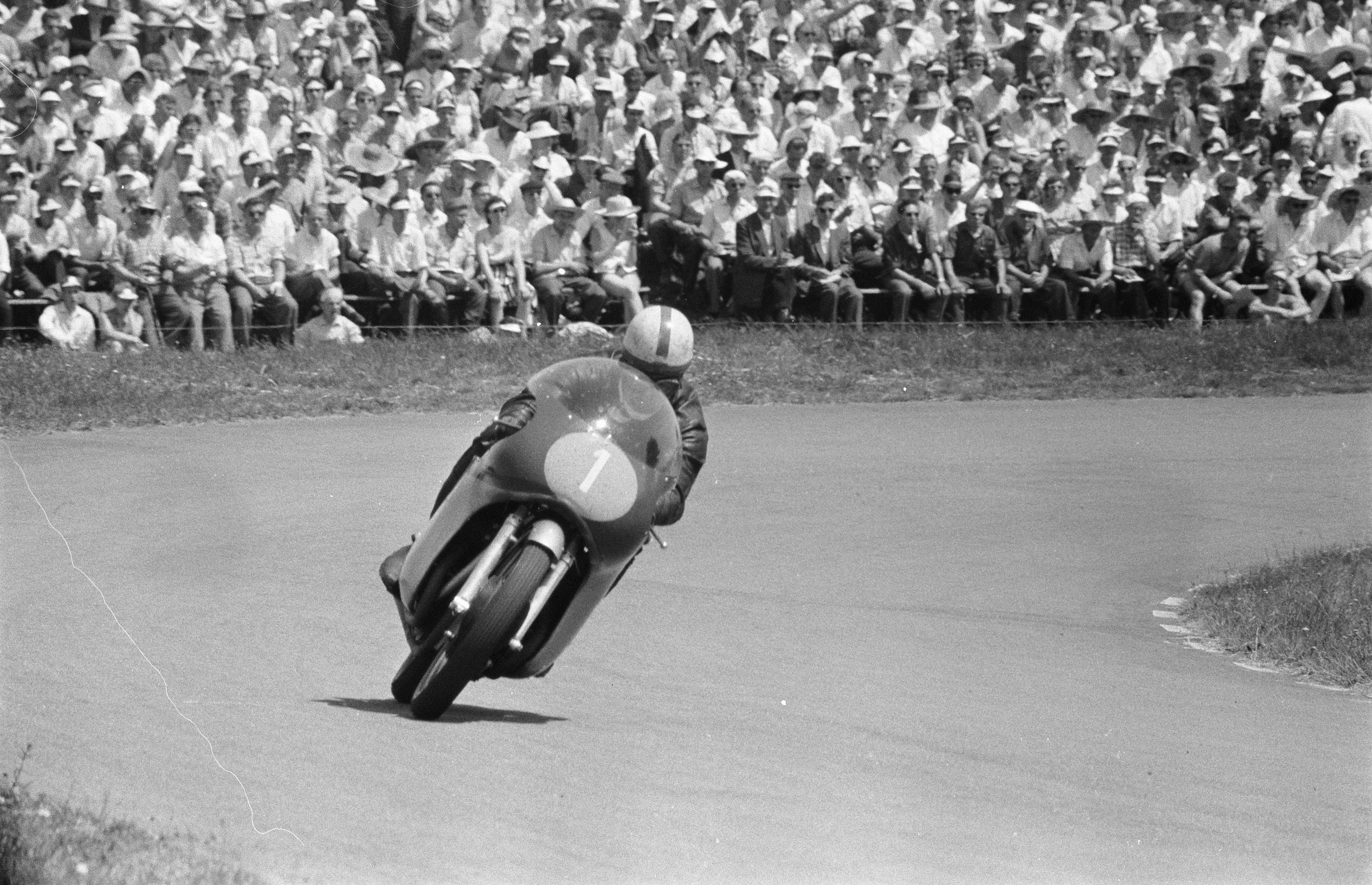
Surtees in action during the 1960 500cc Dutch TT.

In 1956, Surtees won the 500 cc world championship, MV Agusta's first in the senior class. In this Surtees was assisted by the FIM's decision to ban the defending champion, Geoff Duke, for six months because of his support for a riders' strike for more starting money. In the 1957 season, the MV Agustas were no match for the Gileras and Surtees battled to a third-place finish aboard a 1957 MV Agusta 500 Quattro.

When Gilera and Moto Guzzi withdrew from Grand Prix racing at the end of 1957, Surtees and MV Agusta went on to dominate the competition in the two larger displacement classes. In 1958, 1959 and 1960, he won 32 out of 39 races and became the first man to win the Senior TT at the Isle of Man TT three years in succession. In 1958 he also won the first Race of the Year event held at Mallory Park on a MV Agusta.

== Auto racing career ==
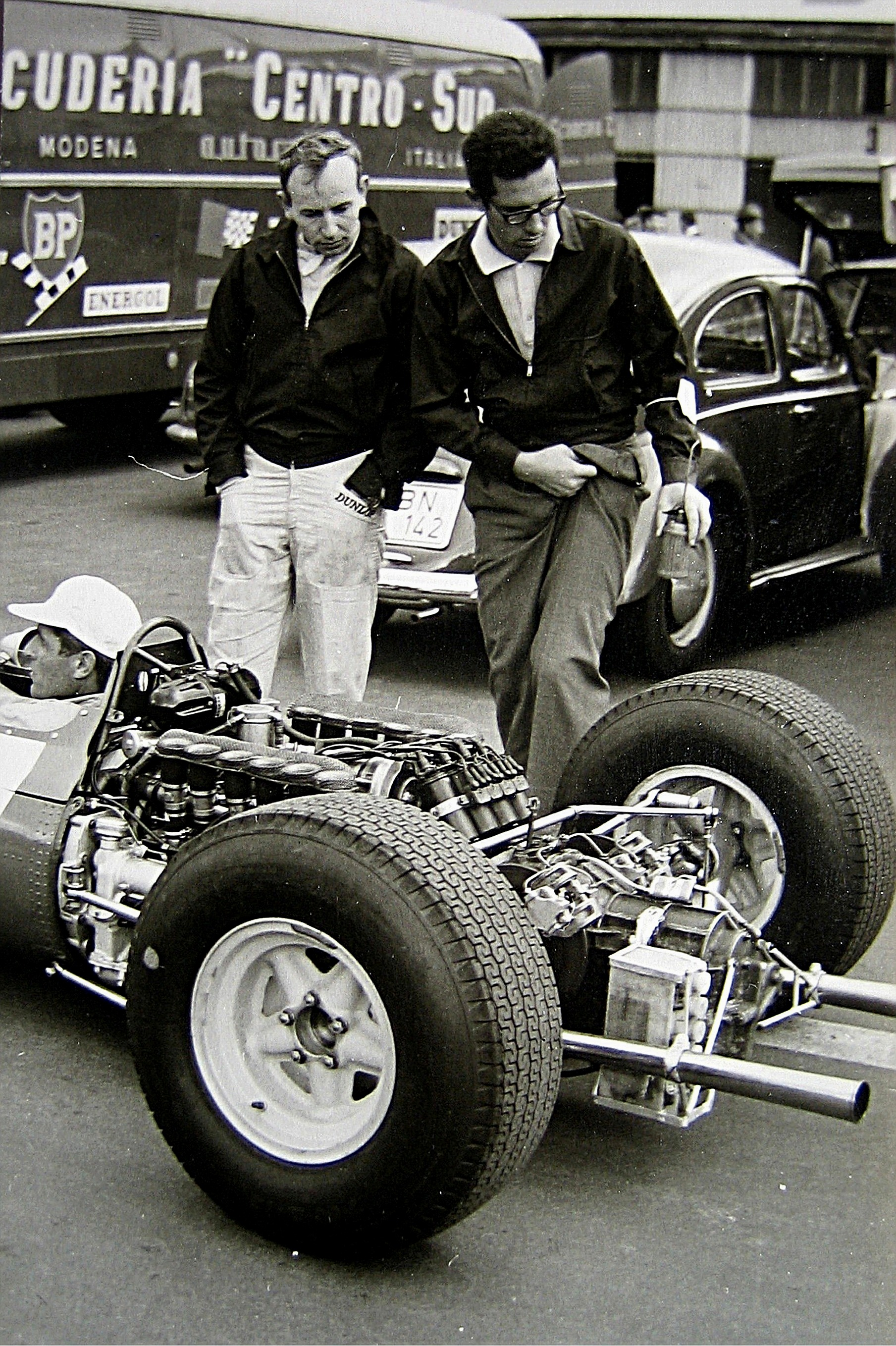
Surtees (left) and Mauro Forghieri in 1965

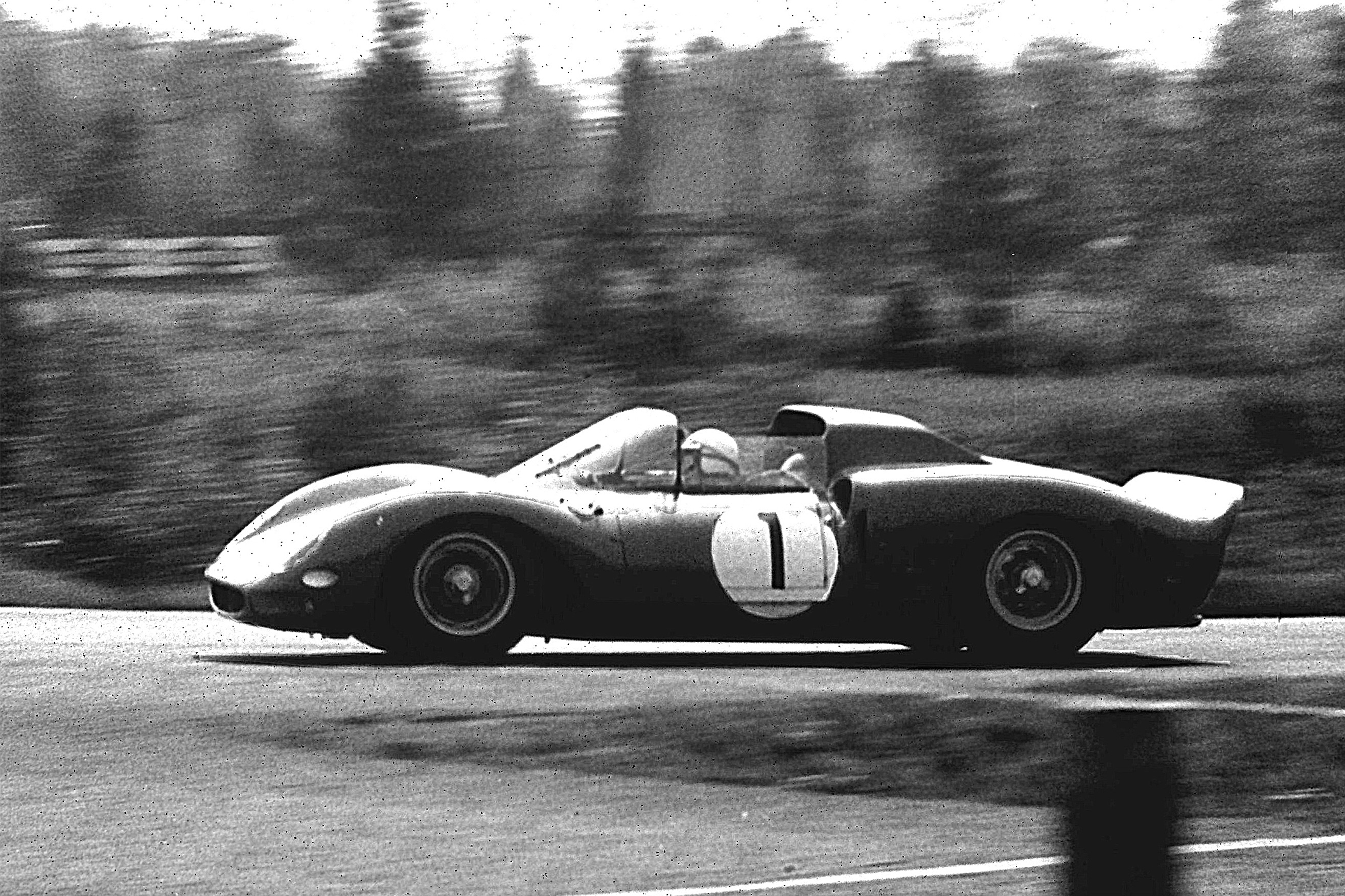
Surtees at the 1965 1000 km Nürburgring

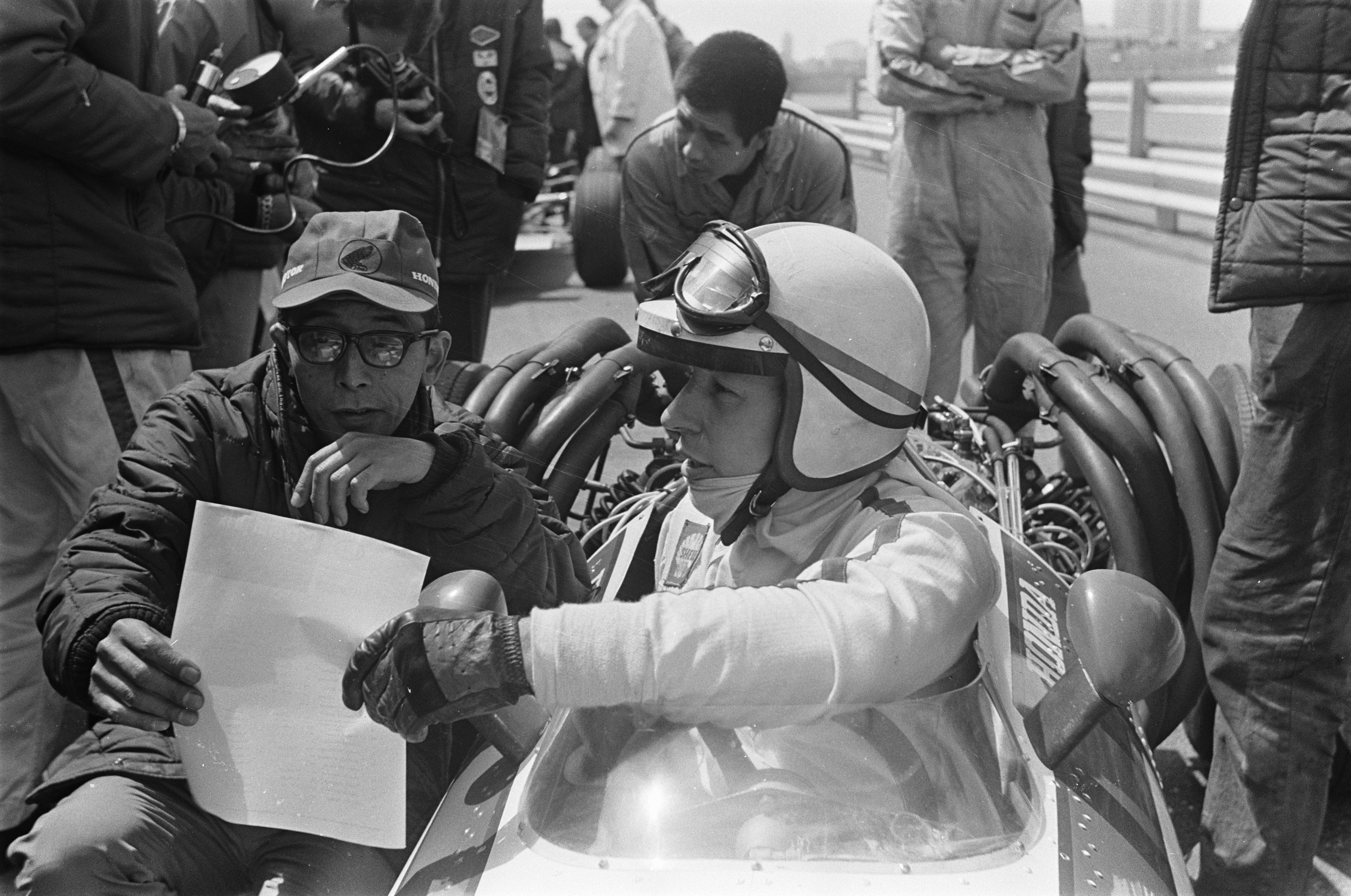
Surtees and Yoshio Nakamura at the 1968 Dutch Grand Prix

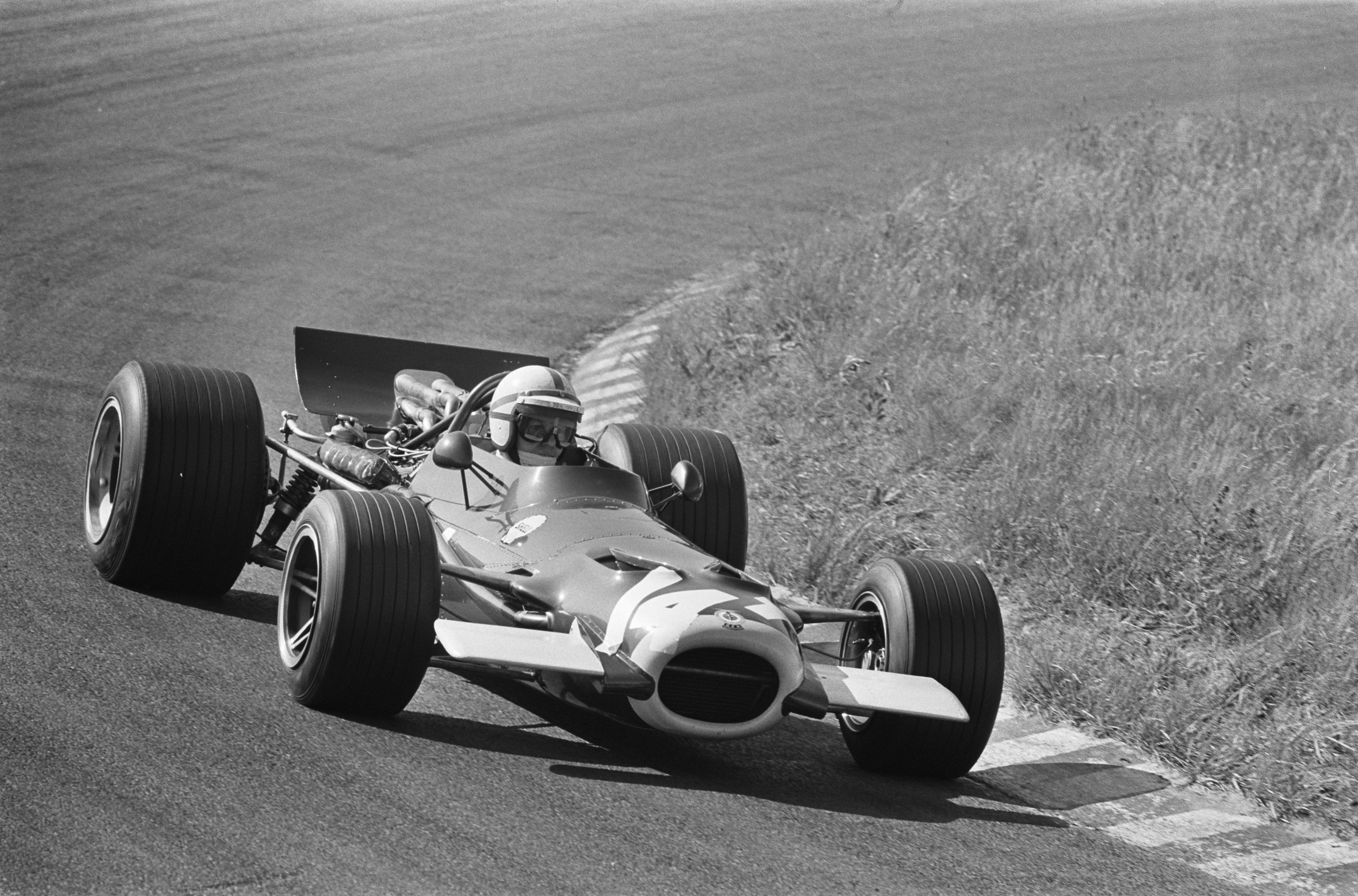
Surtees at the 1969 Dutch Grand Prix

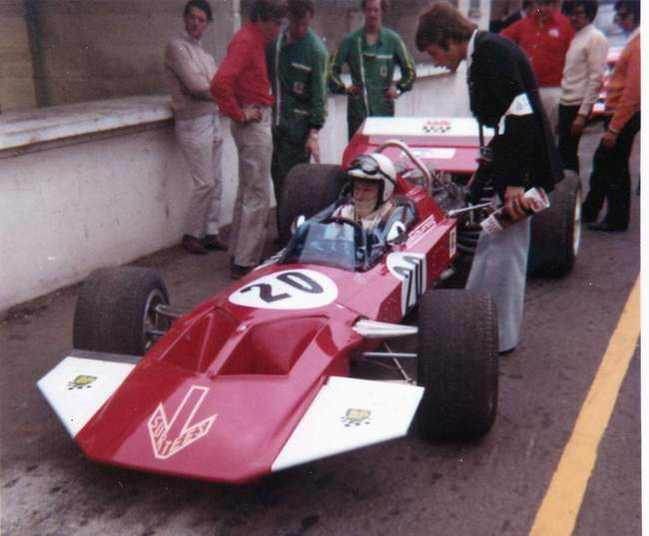
Surtees at the wheel of the Surtees TS7

While still racing motorcycles full-time, Surtees performed a test drive in Aston Martin's DBR1 sports car in front of team manager Reg Parnell. He however continued on two wheels and did not enter car racing until the following year.

In 1960, at the age of 26, Surtees switched from motorcycles to cars full-time, making his Formula 1 debut racing in the 1960 BRDC International Trophy at Silverstone for Team Lotus. He made an immediate impact with a second-place finish in only his second Formula One World Championship race, at the 1960 British Grand Prix, and a pole position at his third, the 1960 Portuguese Grand Prix.

After spending the 1961 season with the Yeoman Credit Racing Team driving a Cooper T53 "Lowline" managed by Reg Parnell and the 1962 season with the Bowmaker Racing Team, still managed by Reg Parnell but now in the V8 Lola Mk4, he moved to Scuderia Ferrari in 1963 and won the World Championship for the Italian team in 1964. During that same season he would be awarded the Hawthorn Memorial Trophy for his achievements that year.

On 25 September 1965, Surtees had a life-threatening accident at the Mosport Park Circuit (Ontario, Canada) while practising in a Lola T70 sports racing car. A front upright casting had broken. A.J. Baime in his book Go Like Hell says Surtees came out of the crash with one side of his body four inches shorter than the other. Doctors set most of the breaks nonsurgically, in part by physically stretching his shattered body until the right-left discrepancy was under an inch – and there it stayed.

The 1966 season saw the introduction of new, larger 3-litre engines to Formula One. Surtees's debut with Ferrari's new F1 car was at the 1966 BRDC International Trophy at Silverstone, where he qualified and finished a close second behind Jack Brabham's 3-litre Brabham BT19. A few weeks later, Surtees led the Monaco Grand Prix, pulling away from Jackie Stewart's 2-litre BRM on the straights, before the engine failed. A fortnight later Surtees survived the first lap rainstorm which eliminated half the field and won the Belgian Grand Prix.

Due to perennial strikes in Italy, Ferrari could afford to enter only two cars (Ferrari P3s) for the 1966 24 Hours of Le Mans instead of its usual entry of three prototypes. Uncertainty and confusion surrounds subsequent events and their consequences, and a number of different explanations have been offered in the decades since. The narrative explained by Ferrari at the time states that under Le Mans rules in 1966 each car was allowed only two drivers. Surtees was omitted from the driver line-up with one works Ferrari to be driven by Mike Parkes and Ludovico Scarfiotti, and the other by Jean Guichet and Lorenzo Bandini. When Surtees questioned Ferrari team manager Eugenio Dragoni as to why, as the Ferrari team leader, he would not be allowed to compete, Dragoni told Surtees that he did not feel that he was fully fit to drive in a 24-hour endurance race because of the injuries he had sustained in late 1965. However, Surtees himself described things somewhat differently. In his recollection, when the pairings were announced he was to drive alongside Scarfiotti. As the faster driver of the two, Surtees argued that he should take the first stint and "try to break" the Ford opposition by driving "flat out from the start". Dragoni denied Surtees's request and insisted that Scarfiotti take the start, supposedly to please Fiat chairman Gianni Agnelli, Scarfiotti's uncle, who was in attendance as a spectator. Either way, the decision and subsequent lack of support from Enzo Ferrari were deeply upsetting to Surtees and he immediately quit the team. This decision likely cost both Ferrari and Surtees the Formula 1 Championship in 1966. Ferrari finished second to Brabham-Repco in the Constructors' Championship and Surtees finished second to Jack Brabham in the Drivers' Championship. Surtees finished the season driving for the Cooper-Maserati team, winning the last race of the season.

Surtees competed with a T70 in the inaugural 1966 Can-Am season, winning three races of six to become champion over other winners Dan Gurney (Lola), Mark Donohue (Lola) and Phil Hill (Chaparral) as well as the likes of Bruce McLaren and Chris Amon (both in McLarens).

In December 1966, Surtees signed for Honda. After a promising third place in the first race in South Africa, the Honda RA273 hit a series of mechanical problems. The car was replaced by the Honda RA300 for the Italian Grand Prix, where Surtees slipstreamed Jack Brabham to take Honda's second F1 victory by 0.2 seconds. Surtees finished fourth in the 1967 Drivers' Championship.

The same year, Surtees drove in the Rex Mays 300 at Riverside, near Los Angeles, in a United States Auto Club season-ending road race. This event pitted the best American drivers of the day – normally those who had cut their teeth as professional drivers on oval dirt tracks – against veteran Formula One Grand Prix drivers, including Jim Clark and Dan Gurney.

In 1970, Surtees formed his own race team, the Surtees Racing Organisation, and spent nine seasons competing in Formula 5000, Formula 2 and Formula 1 as a constructor. He retired from competitive driving in 1972, the same year the team had their greatest success when Mike Hailwood won the European Formula 2 Championship. The team was finally disbanded at the end of 1978.

== After Formula One ==
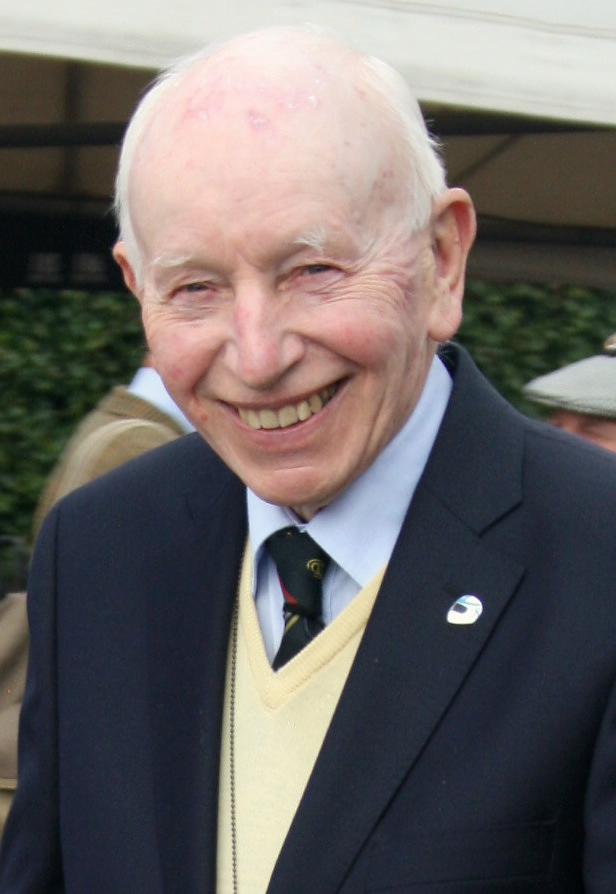
John Surtees in 2011

For a while in the 1970s, Surtees ran a motorcycle shop in West Wickham, Kent, and a Honda car dealership in Edenbridge, Kent. He continued his involvement in motorcycling, participating in classic events with bikes from his stable of vintage racing machines. He also remained involved in single-seater racing cars and held the position of chairman of A1 Team Great Britain, in the A1 Grand Prix racing series from 2005 to 2007. His son, Henry Surtees, competed in the FIA Formula 2 Championship, Formula Renault UK Championship and the Formula BMW UK championship for Carlin Motorsport, before he died while racing in the Formula 2 championship at Brands Hatch on 19 July 2009. In 2010, Surtees founded the Henry Surtees Foundation in his son's memory, as a charitable organization to assist victims of accidental brain injuries and to promote safety in driving and motorsport.

Surtees was the subject of This Is Your Life in 1992 when he was surprised by Michael Aspel.

In 1996, Surtees was inducted into the International Motorsports Hall of Fame. The FIM honoured him as a Grand Prix "Legend" in 2003. Already a Member of the Order of the British Empire (MBE), he was appointed an Officer of the Order of the British Empire (OBE) in the 2008 Birthday Honours and a Commander of the Order of the British Empire (CBE) in the 2016 New Year Honours for services to motorsport.

In 2013, Surtees was awarded the 2012 Segrave Trophy in recognition of multiple world championships, and being the only person to win world titles on 2 and 4 wheels.

In 2015, Surtees was awarded the honorary degree of Doctor of Engineering by Oxford Brookes University.

Surtees was inducted into the Motorsports Hall of Fame of America in 2024.

== Personal life and death ==
Surtees married three times, first to Patricia Burke in 1962; the couple divorced in 1979. His second wife was Janis Sheara, whom he married in 1979 and they divorced in 1982. Jane Sparrow was his third wife, whom he married in 1987, and with whom he had three children, including Henry. Henry would later become a racing driver, but was killed at Brands Hatch in the 2009 FIA Formula Two Championship.

Surtees died of respiratory failure on 10 March 2017 at St George's Hospital in London, at the age of 83. He was buried, next to his son Henry, at St Peter and St Paul's Church in Lingfield, Surrey.

A tribute to Surtees was held at the Goodwood Members Meeting on 19 March 2017.

== Racing record ==
=== Motorcycle Grand Prix results ===
**Position**	1	2	3	4	5	6
**Points**	8	6	4	3	2	1

(key) (Races in bold indicate pole position; races in italics indicate fastest lap)

Year	Class	Team	1	2	3	4	5	6	7	8	9	Points	Rank	Wins
1952	500cc	Norton	SUI	IOM	NED	BEL	GER	ULS; 6	NAT	ESP		1	18th	0
1953	125cc	EMC	IOM; DNS	NED		GER		ULS		NAT	ESP	0	–	0
1953	350cc	Norton	IOM; DNS	NED	BEL	GER	FRA	ULS	SUI	NAT		0	–	0
1953	500cc	Norton	IOM; DNS	NED	BEL	GER	FRA	ULS	SUI	NAT	ESP	0	–	0
1954	350cc	Norton	FRA	IOM; 11	ULS; Ret	BEL	NED	GER	SUI	NAT	ESP	0	–	0
1954	500cc	Norton	FRA	IOM; 15	ULS; 5 †	BEL	NED	GER	SUI	NAT	ESP	0	–	0
1955	250cc	NSU		FRA	IOM	GER; Ret		NED	ULS; 1	NAT		8	7th	1
1955	350cc	Norton			IOM; 4	GER; 3	BEL	NED	ULS; 3	NAT		11	6th	0
1955	500cc	Norton	ESP	FRA	IOM; 29		BEL	NED	ULS	NAT		0	–	0
1955	500cc	BMW				GER; Ret						0	–	0
1956	350cc	MV Agusta	IOM; DSQ	NED; 2	BEL; 1	GER; Ret	ULS	NAT				14	4th	1
1956	500cc	MV Agusta	IOM; 1	NED; 1	BEL; 1	GER	ULS	NAT				24	1st	3
1957	350cc	MV Agusta	GER; Ret	IOM; 4	NED; Ret	BEL; Ret	ULS; Ret	NAT; Ret				3	10th	0
1957	500cc	MV Agusta	GER; Ret	IOM; 2	NED; 1	BEL; Ret	ULS; Ret	NAT; 4				17	3rd	1
1958	350cc	MV Agusta	IOM; 1	NED; 1	BEL; 1	GER; 1	SWE	ULS; 1	NAT; 1			48	1st	6
1958	500cc	MV Agusta	IOM; 1	NED; 1	BEL; 1	GER; 1	SWE	ULS; 1	NAT; 1			48	1st	6
1959	350cc	MV Agusta	FRA; 1	IOM; 1	GER; 1			SWE; 1	ULS; 1	NAT; 1		48	1st	6
1959	500cc	MV Agusta	FRA; 1	IOM; 1	GER; 1	NED; 1	BEL; 1		ULS; 1	NAT; 1		56	1st	7
1960	350cc	MV Agusta	FRA; 3	IOM; 2	NED; 1			ULS; 1	NAT; Ret			26	1st	2
1960	500cc	MV Agusta	FRA; 1	IOM; 1	NED; Ret	BEL; 1	GER; 1	ULS; 2	NAT; 1			46	1st	5

† The 500 cc race was stopped by bad weather, and the FIM excluded the race from the World Championship.

=== Complete Formula One World Championship results ===
(key) (Races in bold indicate pole position; Races in italics indicate fastest lap)

Year	Entrant	Chassis	Engine	1	2	3	4	5	6	7	8	9	10	11	12	13	WDC	Pts
1960	Team Lotus	Lotus 18	Climax FPF 2.5 L4	ARG	MON; Ret	500	NED	BEL	FRA	GBR; 2	**POR**; Ret	ITA	USA; Ret				14th	6
1961	Yeoman Credit Racing Team	Cooper T53	Climax FPF 2.5 L4	MON; 11	NED; 7	BEL; 5	FRA; Ret	GBR; Ret	GER; 5	ITA; Ret	USA; Ret						12th	4
1962	Bowmaker-Yeoman Racing Team	Lola Mk4	Climax FWMV 1.5 V8	**NED**; Ret	MON; 4	BEL; 5	FRA; 5	GBR; 2	GER; 2		USA; Ret	RSA; Ret					4th	19
1962	Bowmaker-Yeoman Racing Team	Lola Mk4A	Climax FWMV 1.5 V8							ITA; Ret							4th	19
1963	Scuderia Ferrari SpA SEFAC	Ferrari 156	Ferrari 178 1.5 V6	MON; 4	BEL; Ret	NED; 3	FRA; Ret	GBR; 2	GER; 1	**ITA**; Ret	USA; Ret	MEX; DSQ	RSA; Ret				4th	22
1964	Scuderia Ferrari SpA SEFAC	Ferrari 158	Ferrari 205B 1.5 V8	MON; Ret	NED; 2	BEL; Ret	FRA; Ret	GBR; 3	**GER**; 1	AUT; Ret	**ITA**; 1						**1st**	**40**
1964	North American Racing Team	Ferrari 158	Ferrari 205B 1.5 V8									USA; 2	MEX; 2				**1st**	**40**
1965	Scuderia Ferrari SpA SEFAC	Ferrari 158	Ferrari 205B 1.5 V8	RSA; 2	MON; 4	BEL; Ret	FRA; 3										5th	17
1965	Scuderia Ferrari SpA SEFAC	Ferrari 1512	Ferrari 207 1.5 F12					GBR; 3	NED; 7	GER; Ret	ITA; Ret	USA	MEX				5th	17
1966	Scuderia Ferrari SpA SEFAC	Ferrari 312/66	Ferrari 218 3.0 V12	MON; Ret	**BEL**; 1												**2nd**	**28**
1966	Cooper Car Company	Cooper T81	Maserati 9/F1 3.0 V12			FRA; Ret	GBR; Ret	NED; Ret	GER; 2	ITA; Ret	USA; 3	**MEX**; 1					**2nd**	**28**
1967	Honda Racing	Honda RA273	Honda RA273E 3.0 V12	RSA; 3	MON; Ret	NED; Ret	BEL; Ret	FRA	GBR; 6	GER; 4	CAN						4th	20
1967	Honda Racing	Honda RA300	Honda RA273E 3.0 V12									ITA; 1	USA; Ret	MEX; 4			4th	20
1968	Honda Racing	Honda RA300	Honda RA273E 3.0 V12	RSA; 8													7th	12
1968	Honda Racing	Honda RA301	Honda RA301E 3.0 V12		ESP; Ret	MON; Ret	BEL; Ret	NED; Ret	FRA; 2	GBR; 5	GER; Ret	**ITA**; Ret	CAN; Ret	USA; 3	MEX; Ret		7th	12
1969	Owen Racing Organisation	BRM P138	BRM P101 3.0 V12	RSA; Ret													11th	6
1969	Owen Racing Organisation	BRM P138	BRM P142 3.0 V12		ESP; 5	MON; Ret	NED; 9	FRA									11th	6
1969	Owen Racing Organisation	BRM P139	BRM P142 3.0 V12						GBR; Ret	GER; DNS	ITA; NC	CAN; Ret	USA; 3	MEX; Ret			11th	6
1970	Team Surtees	McLaren M7C	Ford Cosworth DFV 3.0 V8	RSA; Ret	ESP; Ret	MON; Ret	BEL	NED; 6	FRA								18th	3
1970	Team Surtees	Surtees TS7	Ford Cosworth DFV 3.0 V8							GBR; Ret	GER; 9	AUT; Ret	ITA; Ret	CAN; 5	USA; Ret	MEX; 8	18th	3
1971	Brooke Bond Oxo - Rob Walker	Surtees TS9	Ford Cosworth DFV 3.0 V8	RSA; Ret	ESP; 11	MON; 7	NED; 5	FRA; 8	GBR; 6	GER; 7	AUT; Ret	ITA; Ret	CAN; 11	USA; 17			19th	3
1972	Team Surtees	Surtees TS14	Ford Cosworth DFV 3.0 V8	ARG	RSA	ESP	MON	BEL	FRA	GBR	GER	AUT	ITA; Ret	CAN	USA; DNS		NC	0

=== Non-championship Formula One results ===
(key) (Races in bold indicate pole position) (Races in italics indicate fastest lap)

Year	Entrant	Chassis	Engine	1	2	3	4	5	6	7	8	9	10	11	12	13	14	15	16	17	18	19	20	21
1960	Team Lotus	Lotus 18	Climax FPF 2.5 L4	GLV	INT; Ret	SIL; 6	LOM; Ret	OUL; Ret																
1961	Yeoman Credit Racing Team	Cooper T53	Climax FPF 2.5 L4	LOM; 3	GLV; 1	PAU	BRX; Ret	VIE	AIN; 4	SYR; Ret	NAP	LON	SIL; Ret	SOL	KAN; 3	DAN; Ret	MOD; Ret							
1961	Yeoman Credit Racing Team	Cooper T56	Climax FPF 2.5 L4															FLG; Ret	OUL; Ret	LEW	VAL	RAN	NAT	RSA
1962	Bowmaker-Yeoman Racing Team	Lola Mk4	Climax FPF 2.5 L4	CAP	BRX; Ret	LOM; Ret	LAV; Ret																	
1962	Bowmaker-Yeoman Racing Team	Lola Mk4	Climax FWMV 1.5 V8					GLV; Ret	PAU	AIN; Ret	INT; 3	NAP	MAL; 1	CLP	RMS; Ret	SOL				OUL; Ret		RAN; 3	NAT	
1962	Bowmaker-Yeoman Racing Team	Lola Mk4A	Climax FWMV 1.5 V8														**KAN**; Ret	MED	DAN; Ret					
1962	Bowmaker-Yeoman Racing Team	Lotus 24	Climax FWMV 1.5 V8																		MEX; Ret			
1963	Scuderia Ferrari SpA SEFAC	Ferrari 156	Ferrari 178 1.5 V6	LOM	GLV	PAU	IMO; WD	SYR; WD	AIN	INT; Ret	ROM	SOL	KAN	**MED**; 1	AUT	OUL	**RAN**; 1							
1964	Scuderia Ferrari SpA SEFAC	Ferrari 158	Ferrari 205B 1.5 V8	DMT	NWT	SYR; 1	AIN		SOL; 2	MED	RAN													
1964	Scuderia Ferrari SpA SEFAC	Ferrari 158	Ferrari 178 1.5 V6					INT; Ret																
1965	Scuderia Ferrari SpA SEFAC	Ferrari 158	Ferrari 205B 1.5 V8	ROC; Ret	SYR; 2	SMT	INT; 2	MED	RAN															
1966	Scuderia Ferrari SpA SEFAC	Ferrari 312/66	Ferrari 218 3.0 V12	RSA	**SYR**; 1	INT; 2	OUL																	
1967	Honda Racing	Honda RA273	Honda RA273E 3.0 V12	ROC; Ret	SPC; 3	INT	SYR	OUL	ESP															
1968	Lola Racing	Lola T100	BMW M12 2.0 L4	ROC; DNS	INT	OUL																		
1969	Owen Racing Organisation	BRM P138	BRM P101 3.0 V12	ROC; DNS	INT	MAD	OUL																	
1970	Team Surtees	McLaren M7C	Ford Cosworth DFV 3.0 V8	ROC; Ret	INT																			
1970	Team Surtees	Surtees TS7	Ford Cosworth DFV 3.0 V8			**OUL**; 1																		
1971	Brooke Bond Oxo Team Surtees	Surtees TS9	Ford Cosworth DFV 3.0 V8	ARG	ROC; 3	QUE	SPR; Ret	INT; 11	RIN; 3	OUL; 1	VIC; 6													
1972	Team Surtees	Surtees TS9	Ford Cosworth DFV 3.0 V8	ROC	BRA	INT; 3	OUL	REP	VIC															

=== Complete British Saloon Car Championship results ===
(key) (Races in bold indicate pole position; races in italics indicate fastest lap.)

Year	Team	Car	Class	1	2	3	4	5	6	7	8	9	Pos.	Pts	Class
1961	Peter Berry Racing Ltd	Jaguar Mk II 3.8	D	SNE ovr:2 cls:2	GOO	AIN	SIL	CRY	SIL	BRH	OUL	SNE	27th	6	9th

=== Complete 24 Hours of Le Mans results ===
Year	Team	Co-Drivers	Car	Class	Laps	Pos.	Class Pos.
1963	(Italy) Automobili Ferrari S.E.F.A.C.	(Belgium) Willy Mairesse	Ferrari 250P	P 3.0	252	DNF	DNF
1964	(Italy) SpA Ferrari SEFAC	(Italy) Lorenzo Bandini	Ferrari 330P	P 5.0	337	**3rd**	**3rd**
1965	(Italy) SpA Ferrari SEFAC	(Italy) Ludovico Scarfiotti	Ferrari 330 P2	P 5.0	225	DNF	DNF
1967	(United Kingdom) Lola Cars	(United Kingdom) David Hobbs	Lola T70-Aston Martin	P +5.0	3	DNF	DNF

=== Complete European Formula Two Championship results ===
(key) (Races in bold indicate pole position; races in italics indicate fastest lap)

Year	Entrant	Chassis	Engine	1	2	3	4	5	6	7	8	9	10	11	12	13	14	Pos.	Pts
1967	Lola Racing	Lola T100	Ford	SNE; Ret	SIL; 3							BRH; DNQ	VAL					NC	0^{‡}
1967	Lola Racing	Lola T100	BMW			NÜR; 2	HOC	TUL	JAR	ZAN	PER							NC	0^{‡}
1972	Team Surtees	Surtees TS10	Ford	MAL	THR; Ret	HOC	PAU	PAL; DNQ	HOC	ROU; DNQ	ÖST	IMO; 1	MAN	PER	SAL	ALB	HOC	NC	0^{‡}

^{‡} Graded drivers not eligible for European Formula Two Championship points

=== Complete Canadian-American Challenge Cup results ===
(key) (Races in bold indicate pole position) (Races in italics indicate fastest lap)

Year	Team	Car	Engine	1	2	3	4	5	6	7	8	9	10	11	Pos	Pts
1966	Team Surtees	Lola T70 Mk.2	Chevrolet	**MTR**; 1	BRI; Ret	MOS; Ret	LAG; 12	RIV; 1	LVG; 1						1st	27
1967	Team Surtees	Lola T70 Mk.3	Chevrolet	ROA; 3	BRI; 4	MOS; Ret	LAG; Ret	RIV; Ret	LVG; 1						3rd	16
1969	Chaparral Cars Inc.	McLaren M12	Chevrolet	MOS; 3	MTR; Ret	WGL; 12									9th	30
1969	Chaparral Cars Inc.	Chaparral 2H	Chevrolet				EDM; 4	MOH; 5	ROA; Ret	BRI; Ret	MCH	LAG; DNS	RIV; Ret	TWS	9th	30

Sporting positions
Preceded by Geoff Duke	500cc Motorcycle World Champion; 1956	Succeeded by Libero Liberati
Preceded by Libero Liberati	500cc Motorcycle World Champion; 1958-1960	Succeeded by Gary Hocking
Preceded by Keith Campbell	350cc Motorcycle World Champion; 1958-1960	Succeeded by Gary Hocking
Preceded by Jim Clark	Formula One World Champion; 1964	Succeeded by Jim Clark
Preceded by Inaugural	Can-Am; Champion; 1966	Succeeded by Bruce McLaren
Awards and achievements
Preceded by Ian Black	BBC Sports Personality of the Year; 1959	Succeeded by David Broome
Preceded by Jim Clark	Hawthorn Memorial Trophy; 1964	Succeeded by Jim Clark
