= 1966 United States Grand Prix =

Race details
- Date: October 2, 1966
- Official name: IX United States Grand Prix
- Location: Watkins Glen Grand Prix Race Course; Watkins Glen, New York
- Course: Permanent road course
- Course length: 3.78 km (2.35 miles)
- Distance: 108 laps, 408.2 km (253.8 miles)
- Weather: Cool, dry

Pole position
Driver	(Australia) Jack Brabham	Brabham-Repco
- Time: 1:08.42

Fastest lap
Driver	(United Kingdom) John Surtees	Cooper-Maserati
- Time: 1:09.67 on lap 31

Podium
First	(United Kingdom) Jim Clark	Lotus-BRM
Second	(Austria) Jochen Rindt	Cooper-Maserati
Third	(United Kingdom) John Surtees	Cooper-Maserati

The 1966 United States Grand Prix was a Formula One motor race held on October 2, 1966, at the Watkins Glen Grand Prix Race Course in Watkins Glen, New York. It was race 8 of 9 in both the 1966 World Championship of Drivers and the 1966 International Cup for Formula One Manufacturers. The race was the ninth United States Grand Prix (16th including the American Grand Prize races of 1908–16). It was the sixth to be held at Watkins Glen. The race was held over 108 laps of the 3.78-kilometre circuit for a total race distance of 408 kilometres.

The race was won by British driver Jim Clark driving a Lotus 43 for Team Lotus, equipped with a BRM H16 engine. Clark lapped the field to claim his 20th World Championship win by over a lap. The podium places were filled by Cooper Car Company team mates; Austrian driver Jochen Rindt and British driver John Surtees in their Cooper T81s.

While none of the Brabhams finished, the engine failure of Lorenzo Bandini's Ferrari 312 saw that the Anglo-Australian team could not be caught in the race for the Constructors' championship with only the Mexican Grand Prix. This gave Jack Brabham a unique double, World Drivers' and Constructors' championships in a car of his own make.

This is the only win ever for a 16 cylinder engine in a Formula One World Championship race after the Porsche-designed supercharged V16 Auto Union racing cars had won many Grand Prix in the 1930s.

== Summary ==
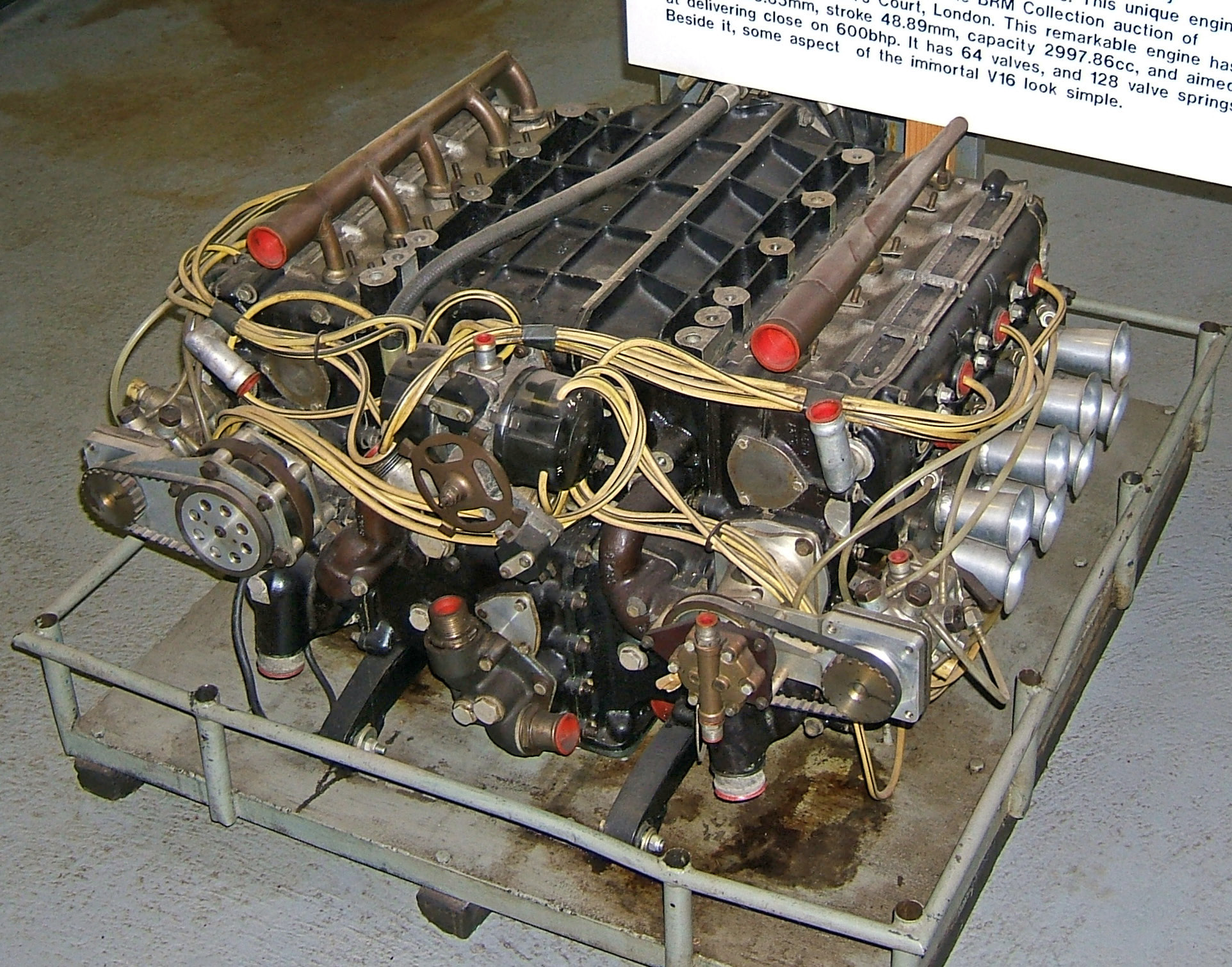
the BRM Type 75 H16 engine

With most of the teams struggling to come to grips with the new 3-liter formula in 1966, Jack Brabham won the World Championship with a neat, simple and lightweight chassis, the Brabham BT19, and a simple Repco V8 engine. It was the Australian's third Drivers' title, and the first by a driver in a car of his own manufacture. But it was Jim Clark's Lotus 43-BRM, with the powerful, heavy, normally unreliable, BRM H16 engine, that crossed the line first at Watkins Glen. Inheriting the lead when Lorenzo Bandini and Brabham retired, Clark finished a full lap ahead of Austrian Jochen Rindt, and recorded the ill-fated H16's only win.

This was the year the Watkins Glen Grand Prix Corporation departed from the traditional starting money system, and instead offered prize money ranging from $20,000 for first to $2,800 for twentieth. The total purse of $102,400 was easily the richest in the World Championship, and the first prize amount was more than the first prizes of all the other races put together. "$100,000 was a magic number at the time," said race director Cameron Argetsinger. "It was a number that spelled 'big league' to American sport fans." The enthusiastic acceptance of this arrangement by the European team managers and owners marked a huge philosophical change for the Grand Prix establishment in how to promote a race meeting.

With the prize money system, finishing was doubly important and Clark intended to use the more reliable two-liter Climax engine until he discovered how quick the H16 could be. Bandini's Ferrari was the first to break the 120-mph barrier at The Glen, as he posted a time of 1:08.67. John Surtees, now in a Cooper after leaving the Ferrari team in mid-season, and Graham Hill were the only other drivers under 1:09 on Friday.

In the closing minutes of Saturday's session, Brabham grabbed the pole at 1:08.42, and Clark joined him on the front row with a 1:08.53. Immediately after recording his best time, Clark heard a thud behind his back, and when he stopped in the pits, there was oil dripping from the H16's exhaust. The BRM team offered a much-used spare H16 engine, and the Lotus mechanics worked into the night fitting it into Clark's race car.

Sunday was cool, but dry, and a crowd of 75,000 included actors who were in the final stages of creating the movie Grand Prix: James Garner (Pete Aron), Toshirō Mifune (Mr. Yamura) and Jessica Walter (Pat Stoddard), as well as director John Frankenheimer. An hour before the start, Clark was still unsure which car to use in the race. He finally chose the Type 43 with BRM's spare H16, and it, too, was leaking oil on the dummy grid before the crew tightened it up and he began his warmup lap. At the flag, Bandini jumped from the second row into the lead, ahead of Clark, Richie Ginther, Brabham, Surtees, Jackie Stewart, Hill and Denny Hulme.

Ginther immediately began dropping back, while Brabham found his rhythm and moved up, taking Clark in 'The 90' on lap four, and then Bandini for the lead on lap 10. Surtees also got around Clark for third spot and had attached himself to the leading pair when they came upon Peter Arundell's Lotus on lap 16. Brabham and Bandini got by entering 'The 90,' but Surtees remained stuck behind. He tried to get around Arundell on the pit straight, and again in The Esses, but as he pulled alongside, the cars touched and both slid across the grass, then headed for the pits. Surtees actually pulled in to the Lotus pit to confront Arundell and had to be restrained by Lotus mechanics. Having wasted several minutes there, he rejoined in thirteenth position, two and a half laps behind.

On lap 20, Bandini regained the lead from Brabham and began to draw away until, suddenly, on lap 34, his engine blew and Brabham found himself alone with a sizable lead over Clark. Surtees, meanwhile, was still steamed over his bout with Arundell and was the fastest car on the track. He unlapped himself once and set the fastest lap of the race on lap 31. Just past half distance, on lap 55, Brabham also blew his engine. Clark was surprised to find himself in the lead, almost a minute ahead of Rindt's Cooper. Surtees continued his charge, unlapping himself for the second time and passing Bruce McLaren and Jo Siffert for third place.

Clark was unchallenged the rest of the way, and came home with the only victory the BRM H16 engine would ever record. When Rindt coasted in two minutes, 28.5 seconds later and out of fuel, his last lap was not counted since it was more than twice the leader's lap time. He retained second place, anyway, on the same lap as teammate Surtees, who was third. The win– Clark's first of the year– ended Graham Hill's three-year string at The Glen, but it marked the fourth year in a row that a BRM engine had won the American Grand Prix. While they did not score any points, Brabham-Repco won the International Cup for Formula One Constructors with one race remaining.

== Classification ==
=== Qualifying ===
Pos	No	Driver	Constructor	Time	Gap
1	5	(Australia) Jack Brabham	Brabham-Repco	1:08.42	—
2	1	(United Kingdom) Jim Clark	Lotus-BRM	1:08.53	+0.11
3	9	(Italy) Lorenzo Bandini	Ferrari	1:08.57	+0.15
4	7	(United Kingdom) John Surtees	Cooper-Maserati	1:08.73	+0.31
5	3	(United Kingdom) Graham Hill	BRM	1:08.87	+0.45
6	4	(United Kingdom) Jackie Stewart	BRM	1:09.17	+0.75
7	6	(New Zealand) Denny Hulme	Brabham-Repco	1:09.28	+0.86
8	12	(United States) Richie Ginther	Honda	1:09.37	+0.95
9	8	(Austria) Jochen Rindt	Cooper-Maserati	1:09.63	+1.21
10	11	(Mexico) Pedro Rodríguez	Lotus-BRM	1:10.40	+1.98
11	17	(New Zealand) Bruce McLaren	McLaren-Ford	1:10.57	+2.15
12	18	(United Kingdom) Mike Spence	Lotus-BRM	1:10.73	+2.31
13	19	(Switzerland) Jo Siffert	Cooper-Maserati	1:10.97	+2.55
14	15	(United States) Dan Gurney	Eagle-Weslake	1:11.03	+2.61
15	22	(Sweden) Jo Bonnier	Cooper-Maserati	1:11.40	+2.98
16	16	(United States) Bob Bondurant	Eagle-Climax	1:12.40	+3.98
17	10	(United Kingdom) Innes Ireland	BRM	1:12.63	+4.21
18	14	(United States) Ronnie Bucknum	Honda	1:12.70	+4.28
19	2	(United Kingdom) Peter Arundell	Lotus-Climax		

=== Race ===
Pos	No	Driver	Constructor	Laps	Time/Retired	Grid	Points
1	1	(United Kingdom) Jim Clark	Lotus-BRM	108	2:09:40.11	2	9
2	8	(Austria) Jochen Rindt	Cooper-Maserati	107	Out of fuel	9	6
3	7	(United Kingdom) John Surtees	Cooper-Maserati	107	+ 1 lap	4	4
4	19	(Switzerland) Jo Siffert	Cooper-Maserati	105	+ 3 laps	13	3
5	17	(New Zealand) Bruce McLaren	McLaren-Ford	105	+ 3 laps	11	2
6	2	(United Kingdom) Peter Arundell	Lotus-Climax	101	+ 7 laps	19	1
Ret	10	(United Kingdom) Innes Ireland	BRM	96	Alternator	17	
NC	12	(United States) Richie Ginther	Honda	81	+ 27 laps	8	
Ret	18	(United Kingdom) Mike Spence	Lotus-BRM	74	Ignition	12	
Ret	14	(United States) Ronnie Bucknum	Honda	58	Engine	18	
NC	22	(Sweden) Jo Bonnier	Cooper-Maserati	57	+ 51 laps	15	
Ret	5	(Australia) Jack Brabham	Brabham-Repco	55	Engine	1	
Ret	4	(United Kingdom) Jackie Stewart	BRM	53	Engine	6	
Ret	3	(United Kingdom) Graham Hill	BRM	52	Differential	5	
Ret	9	(Italy) Lorenzo Bandini	Ferrari	34	Engine	3	
Ret	6	(New Zealand) Denny Hulme	Brabham-Repco	18	Engine	7	
Ret	11	(Mexico) Pedro Rodríguez	Lotus-BRM	13	Retirement	10	
Ret	15	(United States) Dan Gurney	Eagle-Weslake	13	Clutch	14	
DSQ	16	(United States) Bob Bondurant	Eagle-Climax	5	Disqualified	16	

== Notes ==
- This was the 25th Grand Prix win for a Lotus.
- This was Lotus's fourth win of a United States Grand Prix, a new record.
- This was Jack Brabham's 82nd Formula One World Championship race, thereby setting a new record and breaking the old record of 81 race starts set by Maurice Trintignant at the 1964 Italian Grand Prix.

== Championship standings after the race ==
- **Bold text** indicates the World Champions.

Drivers' Championship standings

	Pos	Driver	Points
	1	(Australia) **Jack Brabham**	39
	2	(Austria) Jochen Rindt	22 (24)
1	3	(United Kingdom) John Surtees	19
1	4	(United Kingdom) Graham Hill	17
5	5	(United Kingdom) Jim Clark	16

Constructors' Championship standings

	Pos	Constructor	Points
	1	(United Kingdom) **Brabham-Repco**	40 (43)
	2	(Italy) Ferrari	31 (32)
1	3	(United Kingdom) Cooper-Maserati	24 (26)
1	4	(United Kingdom) BRM	22
1	5	(United Kingdom) Lotus-BRM	13

- Notes: Only the top five positions are included for both sets of standings. Only the best 5 results counted towards the Championship. Numbers without parentheses are Championship points; numbers in parentheses are total points scored.

Previous race: 1966 Italian Grand Prix	FIA Formula One World Championship; 1966 season	Next race: 1966 Mexican Grand Prix
Previous race: 1965 United States Grand Prix	United States Grand Prix	Next race: 1967 United States Grand Prix
