= 1966 Italian Grand Prix =

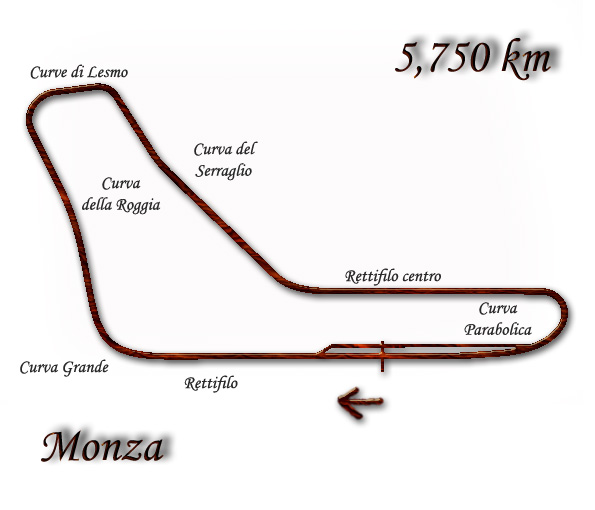

Race details
- Date: 4 September 1966
- Official name: XXXVII Gran Premio d'Italia
- Location: Autodromo Nazionale di Monza; Monza, Italy
- Course: Permanent racing facility
- Course length: 5.750 km (3.573 miles)
- Distance: 68 laps, 391.000 km (242.964 miles)
- Weather: Warm, dry and sunny

Pole position
Driver	(United Kingdom) Mike Parkes	Ferrari
- Time: 1:31.3

Fastest lap
Driver	(Italy) Ludovico Scarfiotti	Ferrari
- Time: 1:32.4 on lap 49

Podium
First	(Italy) Ludovico Scarfiotti	Ferrari
Second	(United Kingdom) Mike Parkes	Ferrari
Third	(New Zealand) Denny Hulme	Brabham-Repco

The 1966 Italian Grand Prix was a Formula One motor race held at Monza on 4 September 1966. It was race 7 of 9 in both the 1966 World Championship of Drivers and the 1966 International Cup for Formula One Manufacturers. The race was the 36th Italian Grand Prix and the 32nd to be held at Monza. The race was held over 68 laps of the five kilometre circuit for a race distance of 391 kilometres.

The race was won by Italian driver Ludovico Scarfiotti driving a Ferrari 312 in his only Grand Prix victory. Scarfiotti led home his British teammate Mike Parkes by five seconds. Parkes only just defeated New Zealand racer Denny Hulme in his Brabham BT20, the pair separated by less than half a second.

While series points leader Jack Brabham stopped with an oil leak in his Brabham BT19 on lap seven, he secured his third world championship, and the unique achievement of becoming world champion in a car of his own make, when his only remaining points rival John Surtees stopped with a fuel leak in his Cooper T81 24 laps later. His championship victory also ended a four-year-streak of British drivers winning the Drivers' Championship.

Scarfiotti's victory was the last time an Italian won the Italian Grand Prix until Kimi Antonelli won the 2026 Italian Grand Prix, six decades later.

== Race report ==
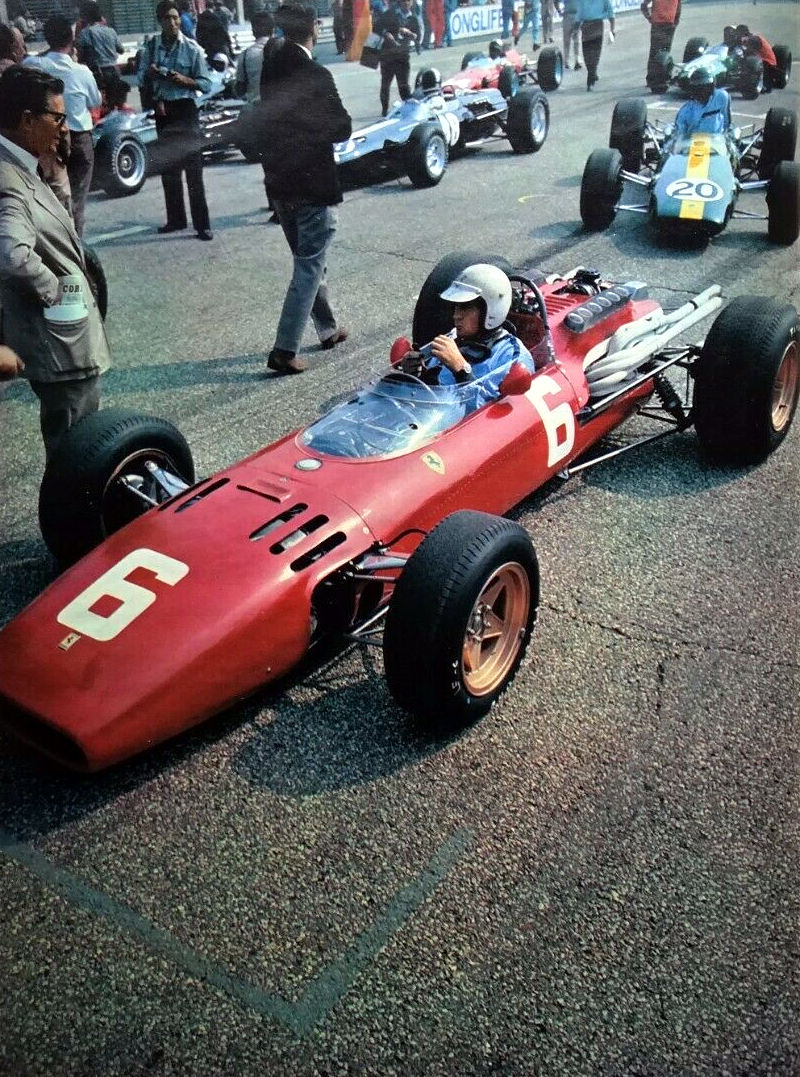
Race winner Ludovico Scarfiotti inside his Ferrari 312 prior the start

Jack Brabham was odds-on favourite for the Championship – only John Surtees could stop him and only then by winning all three remaining races. He was prevented from doing so by an impressive performance from his former employers Ferrari at their home track. Honda had brought a new 370 bhp 3 litre V12 engine for Richie Ginther, whilst Dan Gurney had his Weslake engine and Graham Hill had the BRM H16. Lorenzo Bandini and Mike Parkes led from the start, whilst Hill's engine gave up on the first lap, followed in retirement by Jackie Stewart on lap 5 with a fuel leak, and then Brabham on lap 8 with an engine failure which coated the car in oil. Jim Clark in the H16 Lotus was moving strongly through the field. On lap 17, Richie Ginther had a horrific accident, crashing heavily into the trees and being very fortunate to escape with his life. Once Clark had pitted, Ludovico Scarfiotti, Parkes, Surtees and Hill disputed the lead until Surtees withdrew with a split petrol tank which was pouring it all over his tyres and ending his championship chances. Denny Hulme had fought through the field to third place. But the race was Scarfiotti's, as he became the first Italian to win for Ferrari at Monza since Alberto Ascari in 1952. Parkes completed Ferrari's joy as he pipped Hulme by 0.3 seconds to claim second spot. Amidst all the celebrations, Jack Brabham was crowned champion. Apart from three NART entries in 1969 this race was the last time a Ferrari car was entered by a privateer team when Giancarlo Baghetti drove a private car entered by the British Reg Parnell team.

== Classification ==
=== Qualifying ===
Pos	No	Driver	Constructor	Time	Gap
1	4	(United Kingdom) Mike Parkes	Ferrari	1:31.3	—
2	6	(Italy) Ludovico Scarfiotti	Ferrari	1:31.6	+0.3
3	20	(United Kingdom) Jim Clark	Lotus-BRM	1:31.8	+0.5
4	14	(United Kingdom) John Surtees	Cooper-Maserati	1:31.9	+0.6
5	2	(Italy) Lorenzo Bandini	Ferrari	1:32.0	+0.7
6	10	(Australia) Jack Brabham	Brabham-Repco	1:32.2	+0.9
7	18	(United States) Richie Ginther	Honda	1:32.4	+1.1
8	16	(Austria) Jochen Rindt	Cooper-Maserati	1:32.7	+1.4
9	28	(United Kingdom) Jackie Stewart	BRM	1:32.81	+1.51
10	12	(New Zealand) Denny Hulme	Brabham-Repco	1:32.84	+1.54
11	26	(United Kingdom) Graham Hill	BRM	1:33.4	+2.1
12	38	(Sweden) Jo Bonnier	Cooper-Maserati	1:33.7	+2.4
13	24	(United Kingdom) Peter Arundell	Lotus-BRM	1:34.1	+2.8
14	42	(United Kingdom) Mike Spence	Lotus-BRM	1:35.0	+3.7
15	40	(United Kingdom) Bob Anderson	Brabham-Climax	1:35.3	+4.0
16	44	(Italy) Giancarlo Baghetti	Ferrari	1:35.5	+4.2
17	36	(Switzerland) Jo Siffert	Cooper-Maserati	1:36.3	+5.0
18	48	(United States) Bob Bondurant	BRM	1:36.9	+5.6
19	34	(United States) Dan Gurney	Eagle-Climax	1:37.6	+6.3
20	22	(Italy) Geki	Lotus-Climax	1:39.3	+8.0
DNQ	34	(United States) Phil Hill	Eagle-Climax	1:40.0	+8.7
DNQ	32	(New Zealand) Chris Amon	Brabham-BRM	1:40.3	+9.0

- Clark, Geki, and Spence switched numbers for the race when they are driving the same cars.
- Phil Hill's car was driven by Gurney in practice, but he would drive car #30 of Eagle-Weslake for the race.

=== Race ===
Pos	No	Driver	Constructor	Laps	Time/Retired	Grid	Points
1	6	(Italy) Ludovico Scarfiotti	Ferrari	68	1:47:14.8	2	9
2	4	(United Kingdom) Mike Parkes	Ferrari	68	+ 5.8	1	6
3	12	(New Zealand) Denny Hulme	Brabham-Repco	68	+ 6.1	10	4
4	16	(Austria) Jochen Rindt	Cooper-Maserati	67	+ 1 lap	8	3
5	42	(United Kingdom) Mike Spence	Lotus-BRM	67	+ 1 lap	14	2
6	40	(United Kingdom) Bob Anderson	Brabham-Climax	66	+ 2 laps	15	1
7	48	(United States) Bob Bondurant	BRM	65	+ 3 laps	18	
8	24	(United Kingdom) Peter Arundell	Lotus-BRM	63	Engine	13	
9	20	(Italy) Geki	Lotus-Climax	63	+ 5 laps	20	
NC	44	(Italy) Giancarlo Baghetti	Ferrari	59	+ 9 laps	16	
Ret	22	(United Kingdom) Jim Clark	Lotus-BRM	58	Gearbox	3	
Ret	36	(Switzerland) Jo Siffert	Cooper-Maserati	46	Engine	17	
Ret	2	(Italy) Lorenzo Bandini	Ferrari	33	Ignition	5	
Ret	14	(United Kingdom) John Surtees	Cooper-Maserati	31	Fuel leak	4	
Ret	18	(United States) Richie Ginther	Honda	16	Accident	7	
Ret	10	(Australia) Jack Brabham	Brabham-Repco	7	Oil leak	6	
Ret	30	(United States) Dan Gurney	Eagle-Weslake	7	Engine	19	
Ret	28	(United Kingdom) Jackie Stewart	BRM	5	Fuel leak	9	
Ret	38	(Sweden) Jo Bonnier	Cooper-Maserati	3	Throttle	12	
Ret	26	(United Kingdom) Graham Hill	BRM	0	Engine	11	
DNQ	34	(United States) Phil Hill	Eagle-Climax				
DNQ	32	(New Zealand) Chris Amon	Brabham-BRM				

== Notes ==
- Ludovico Scarfiotti was only the third Italian to win his home Grand Prix, after Nino Farina and Alberto Ascari.
- This was the Formula One World Championship debut for British engine supplier Weslake.

== Championship standings after the race ==
Drivers' Championship standings

	Pos	Driver	Points
	1	(Australia) Jack Brabham	39
2	2	(Austria) Jochen Rindt	18
1	3	(United Kingdom) Graham Hill	17
1	4	(United Kingdom) John Surtees	15
	5	(United Kingdom) Jackie Stewart	14

Constructors' Championship standings

Pos	Constructor	Points
1	(United Kingdom) Brabham-Repco	40 (43)
2	(Italy) Ferrari	31 (32)
3	(United Kingdom) BRM	22
4	(United Kingdom) Cooper-Maserati	20
5	(United Kingdom) Lotus-Climax	7

- Notes: Only the top five positions are included for both sets of standings. Only the best 5 results counted towards the Championship. Numbers without parentheses are Championship points; numbers in parentheses are total points scored.

Previous race: 1966 German Grand Prix	FIA Formula One World Championship; 1966 season	Next race: 1966 United States Grand Prix
Previous race: 1965 Italian Grand Prix	Italian Grand Prix	Next race: 1967 Italian Grand Prix
