= Luki Botha =

South African racing driver (1930–2006)

- Born: 16 January 1930; Pretoria, Union of South Africa
- Died: 1 October 2006 (aged 76)

Formula One World Championship career
- Nationality: (South Africa) South African
- Active years: 1967
- Team: Privateer Brabham
- Entries: 1
- Championships: 0
- Wins: 0
- Podiums: 0
- Career points: 0
- Pole positions: 0
- Fastest laps: 0
- First entry: 1967 South African Grand Prix

Lukas "Luki" Botha (16 January 1930 – 1 October 2006) was a Formula One driver from South Africa, who raced in one World Championship Grand Prix, driving a privately entered Brabham BT11 in the 1967 South African Grand Prix.

Born in Pretoria, Transvaal, South Africa, Botha was an avid sports car and endurance racer. His first car was a South African built Dart with a 1500cc Ford engine with a Cosworth camshaft. He achieved a second in class finish in his first three-hour race with this car. He graduated to a Lotus 23 with a Cosworth 1100cc later in 1965 with which he won five national class races in 1966. The car was in an accident later in the year as the rear suspension failed on the Jukskei sweep at Kyalami.

In the latter half of 1966, Botha bought an Elva MK VII and a 1760cc engine from a Porsche RS5 Spider. These two were combined to create an Elva Mk VII-Porsche RS. This proved a formidable combination; his first 2000cc Sports Car Class win came in the car at Bulawayo. Later in a nine-hour endurance race at Kyalami the gearbox failed, but not before setting a fastest lap in his class of 1:34:50 for the old circuit.

During the VIII Grande Premio de Angola, the Elva proved its worth, achieving a fifth overall splitting the pack of Ferrari 250GTs from first to eighth. He achieved a win over the factory Porsches, Ford GT40s and Lolas. Botha later commented that it was his most enjoyable racing experience. He won six Sports Car class races, and two 2000cc 2/3 hour endurance races and only replaced the gearbox once on the car.

Botha's move to Formula One came in the form of a Brabham BT11 with a Climax 2000cc engine. On his first outing with the new car he came second (November 1966). He took part in the South African series races the following year until July. He also competed in that year's South African Grand Prix, part of the Formula One World Championship. After 38 laps he had a mechanical problem that was resolved with the help of a spectator and continued to finish the race with 60 laps to his credit. He was not classified at the finish.

During a race at Lourenço Marques, now Maputo, in Mozambique, Botha crashed heavily as a run-off area was swamped by the crowd. The crash claimed the lives of nine spectators and injured 17. After the crash, he did get back into the seat of a racing car, but felt that the spark was no longer there and stopped.

Botha continued his work in civil engineering and assisted with some of the civil engineering work in Soweto. Later he continued his love of South Africa by farming in the KZN-Midlands before moving to East London to fill a post as an engineer. A number of years later he moved his family back to his birth town of Pretoria where he later was appointed as CEO of the Tswane Metropolitan Council.

== Complete Formula One World Championship results ==
(key)

Year	Entrant	Chassis	Engine	1	2	3	4	5	6	7	8	9	10	11	WDC	Points
1967	Luki Botha	Brabham BT11	Climax Straight-4	RSA; NC	MON	NED	BEL	FRA	GBR	GER	CAN	ITA	USA	MEX	NC	0
