= Jonathan Williams (racing driver) =

British racing driver (1942–2014)

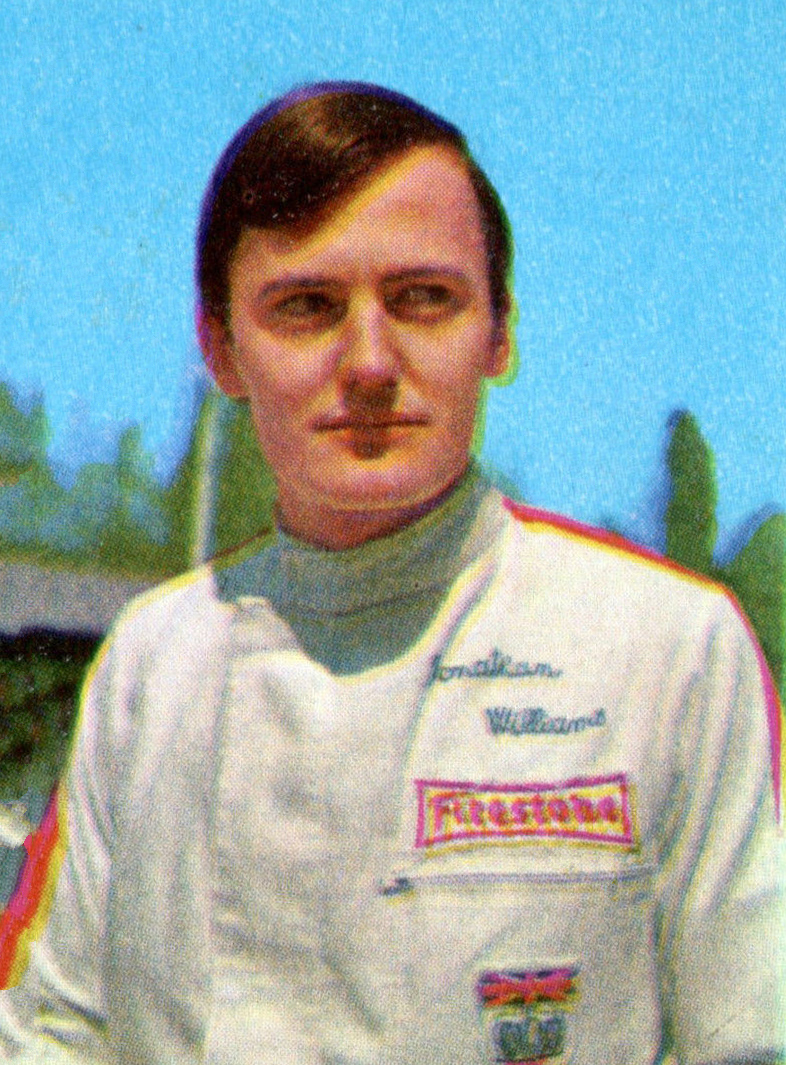
- Williams c. 1966
- Born: Jonathan James Williams; 26 October 1942; Cairo, Egypt
- Died: 31 August 2014 (aged 71); Arroyo de la Miel, Spain

Formula One World Championship career
- Nationality: (United Kingdom) British
- Active years: 1967
- Team: Scuderia Ferrari
- Entries: 1
- Championships: 0
- Wins: 0
- Podiums: 0
- Career points: 0
- Pole positions: 0
- Fastest laps: 0
- First entry: 1967 Mexican Grand Prix

Jonathan James Williams (26 October 1942 – 31 August 2014) was a British racing driver.

Born in Cairo, Egypt, Williams participated in one Formula One World Championship Grand Prix, on 22 October 1967. He finished 8th, scoring no World Championship points.

Williams' racing career began in the early 1960s, competing in saloons and various junior formulae, graduating to Formula Three in 1963 and in 1966 drove for the de Sanctis team. During this time he worked with the young Sir Frank Williams (no relation), Sheridan Thynne and Piers Courage.

In 1967, Williams was signed by Scuderia Ferrari, initially competing in sports car racing. That year, Ferrari lost several drivers, including team leader Lorenzo Bandini who died from injuries sustained at that year's Monaco Grand Prix and Williams' sports car co-driver, Günter Klass, killed during practice at the Mugello Circuit in July. Later that year, Williams was offered a drive in F1, but after only one Grand Prix, he was dropped by Ferrari and a subsequent F1 project with Abarth did not come to fruition. However, he did compete in some Formula Two events in 1968 winning the Rhine Cup race in a car entered by Sir Frank Williams, before driving the works Serenissima. In 1969, he helped develop the De Tomaso F1 car for Frank Williams as well as continuing to compete in F2.

Williams continued also to be active in sports car racing. At the 1970 24 Hours of Le Mans, he co-drove the Porsche 908/02 which carried cameras for the Steve McQueen movie Le Mans.

Williams retired from racing in 1972 and became a pilot, (initially for Alessandro de Tomaso) an occupation he claimed to dislike and subsequently a writer and photographer.

Williams died on 31 August 2014, aged 71. He appeared in the documentary film Steve McQueen: The Man & Le Mans, released nine months after his death and which closes with a clip of Williams driving in the 1971 film Le Mans.

== Racing record ==
=== Complete Formula One World Championship results ===
(key)

Year	Entrant	Chassis	Engine	1	2	3	4	5	6	7	8	9	10	11	WDC	Points
1967	Scuderia Ferrari SpA SEFAC	Ferrari 312/67	Ferrari 242 3.0 V12	RSA	MON	NED	BEL	FRA	GBR	GER	CAN	ITA	USA	MEX; 8	NC	0

=== Complete European Formula Two Championship results ===
(key)

Year	Entrant	Chassis	Engine	1	2	3	4	5	6	7	8	9	Pos.	Points
1968	Merlyn Racing	Merlyn MK 12	Ford Cosworth FVA 1.6 L4	HOC	THR	JAR	PAL	TUL	ZAN; 8				NC	0
1968	Ron Harris Racing Division	Tecno TF68	Ford Cosworth FVA 1.6 L4							PER; Ret	HOC	VAL	NC	0
1969	Alejandro de Tomaso	De Tomaso 103	Ford Cosworth FVA 1.6 L4	THR	HOC	NÜR	JAR	TUL; NC	PER	VAL			NC	0
