= Brian Hart =

British racing driver and engineer (1936–2014)

- Born: 7 September 1936; Enfield, London
- Died: 5 January 2014 (aged 77); Epping, Essex

Formula One World Championship career
- Nationality: (United Kingdom) British
- Active years: 1967
- Team: Privateer Protos
- Entries: 1
- Championships: 0
- Wins: 0
- Podiums: 0
- Career points: 0
- Pole positions: 0
- Fastest laps: 0
- First entry: 1967 German Grand Prix

Brian Roger Hart (7 September 1936 – 5 January 2014) was a British racing driver and engineer with a background in the aviation industry. He founded Brian Hart Limited, a company that developed and built engines for motorsport use.

== Racing career ==
Beginning in 1958 with a Lotus Seven in the 1172 championship, in 1959, Hart teamed up with Len Terry to drive his Terrier Mk2 in the championship and won the Chapman Trophy. In 1960, he drove Terry's front-engined Formula Junior Terrier Mk4 and developed a downdraught head for the Ford Anglia engine powering the car. At Oulton Park in October 1960, Hart had a bad crash with the car, which led to Terry designing the Mk4 series 2, which Hart drove in 1961. The rear-engined cars were now the state of the art and Hart had only limited success with the car. Hart enjoyed a successful career as a driver in various single-seater formulae. He competed in Formula Junior and Formula Three, then graduated to Formula Two with the works Lotus Formula Two team run by Ron Harris. He competed in a handful of non-championship Formula One races using Formula Two cars and in 1967, he qualified for the German Grand Prix at the Nürburgring in a Protos-Cosworth.

As Hart's professional life took more of his time, he retired from racing in 1971.

== Engineering career ==
It was towards the end of 1967 that Hart began working at the de Havilland aircraft company at Hatfield, England. The company provided training in the design and construction of airframes and aero engines. He then moved to the renowned engine builder Cosworth, but left in 1969 to form his own eponymous company to service Cosworth's Ford FVA engines. Brian Hart Limited was soon commissioned by Ford to work on new engine development, in a similar role to his former employer. Hart developed the Ford BDA, which would be used in Ford's rally programs throughout the 1970s.

The Hart-tuned Ford FVA and BDA engines were successful in Formula Two, with Ronnie Peterson winning the European title with an FVA in 1971 and Mike Hailwood taking the same title in 1972 with a BDA. The arrival in F2 of BMW and Renault left Ford reluctant to increase its involvement, so Hart chose to develop his own F2 engine – the 420R – which was first raced in a Chevron sportscar in 1976. This engine was a race winner in F2 in 1977 and 1978.

The off-season of 1978–79 brought the next step in the development of Brian Hart Limited, when the Toleman F2 team committed to providing finance for R&D. Toleman-Hart dominated the European F2 Championship in 1980, with Brian Henton and Derek Warwick finishing 1st and 2nd in the championship standings.

== Formula One ==
As part of Toleman's entry into the FIA Formula One World Championship in 1981, Hart developed a turbocharged version of the 420R. Although it was initially underpowered and unreliable, it was enough to establish Brian Hart Limited as a Formula One engine supplier. Hart continued as Toleman's engine partner until the team's purchase by Benetton and later supplied engines to RAM, Haas Lola and Tyrrell in the 1980s, as well as Jordan and Arrows in the 1990s.

Turbocharging was prohibited at the end of 1988 in response to the increasing four-figure power outputs, which meant a return to developing naturally aspirated configurations that had not been widely used since the beginning of the decade. Cosworth, however, was one company that – aside from its V6 turbo project, which was only used for less than two years – had continued to build naturally aspirated V8s for F2 and a few of the least well funded F1 teams. Brian Hart Limited returned to its previous role as a tuning and servicing specialist, working in partnership with Cosworth to develop its DFZ and DFR engines (which owed a lot to the original DFV).

By 1992, Brian Hart Limited had funded the design of its first V10 engine – the Type 1035 – and in November that year, it announced an exclusive two-year deal to supply Jordan Grand Prix. It was a promising partnership that brought some good results – notably, Rubens Barrichello's 3rd place at the 1994 Pacific Grand Prix at Aida, Japan. However, when Peugeot decided to enter Formula One and offered Jordan a factory deal, the contract with Hart was not renewed. Hart instead opted to supply Footwork/Arrows, which was struggling financially at the time. The lack of funds prevented Hart from developing the V10 and the older V8 was used instead.

In 1997, Hart turned to Minardi and began working on another V10 design, but he was never able to fully finance the project. When Arrows' owner, Tom Walkinshaw, purchased Brian Hart Limited later that year, the injection of capital turned that design into the Arrows V10. The deal was marred by legal action taken over money that was allegedly owed and Brian Hart parted company with Arrows and Formula One before the end of the year.

Arrows itself went into liquidation in 2002.

== Complete World Championship Grand Prix results ==
(key)

Year	Entrant	Chassis	Engine	1	2	3	4	5	6	7	8	9	10	11	WDC	Points
1967	Ron Harris	Protos (F2)	Ford Straight-4	RSA	MON	NED	BEL	FRA	GBR	GER; NC	CAN	ITA	USA	MEX	NC	0

== Sources ==
- GrandPrix.com Encyclopedia
- Autocourse Archive
