= 1967 Formula One season =

21st season of FIA Formula One motor racing

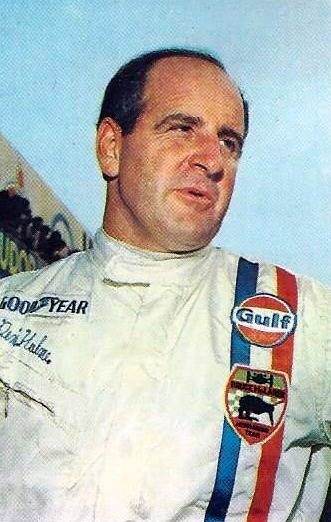
Denny Hulme (pictured in 1970) won his first and only championship, driving a Brabham-Repco.

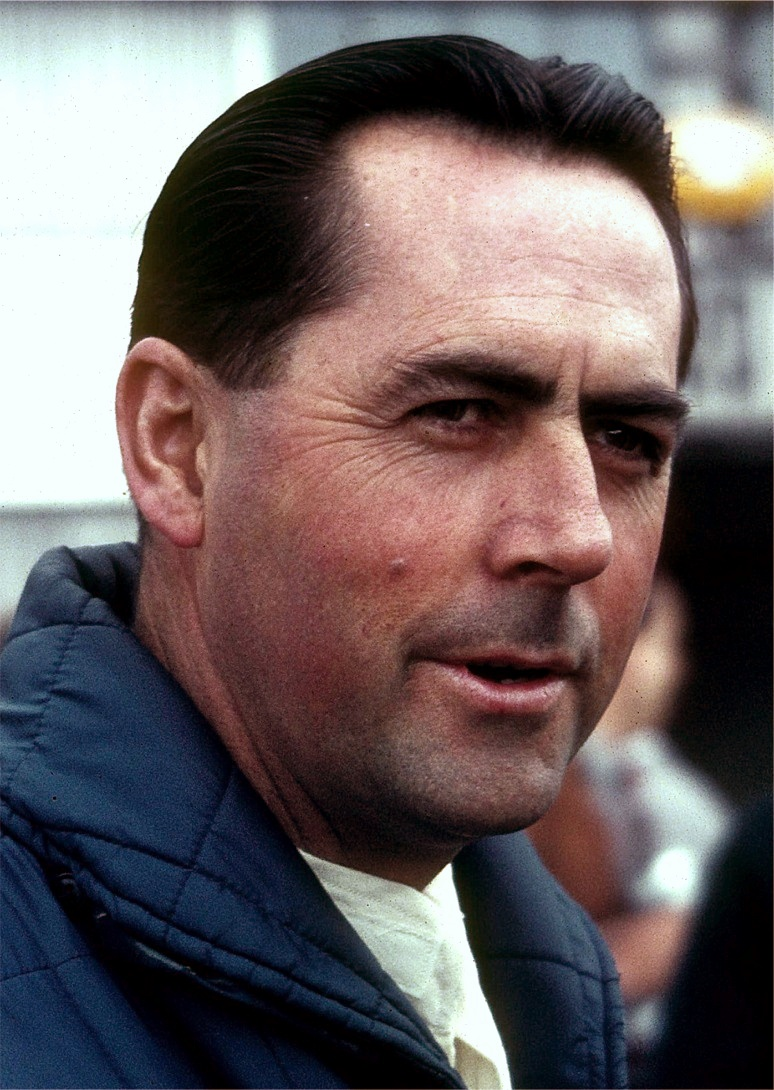
Hulme's teammate and team owner Jack Brabham (pictured in 1966), the three-time and defending Drivers' Champion, finished in second, five points behind.

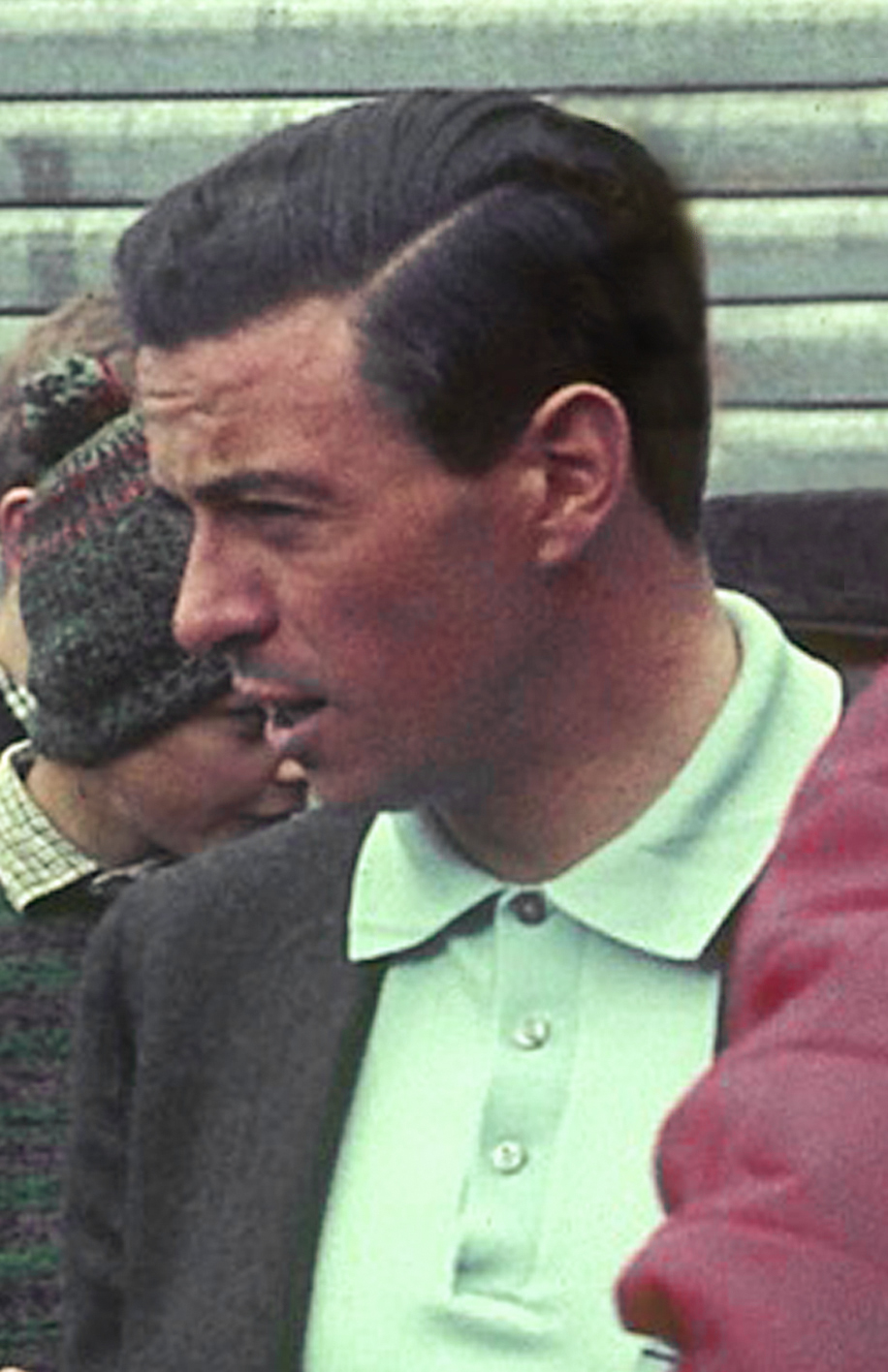
Two-time Champion Jim Clark (pictured in 1966) placed third, driving for Lotus.

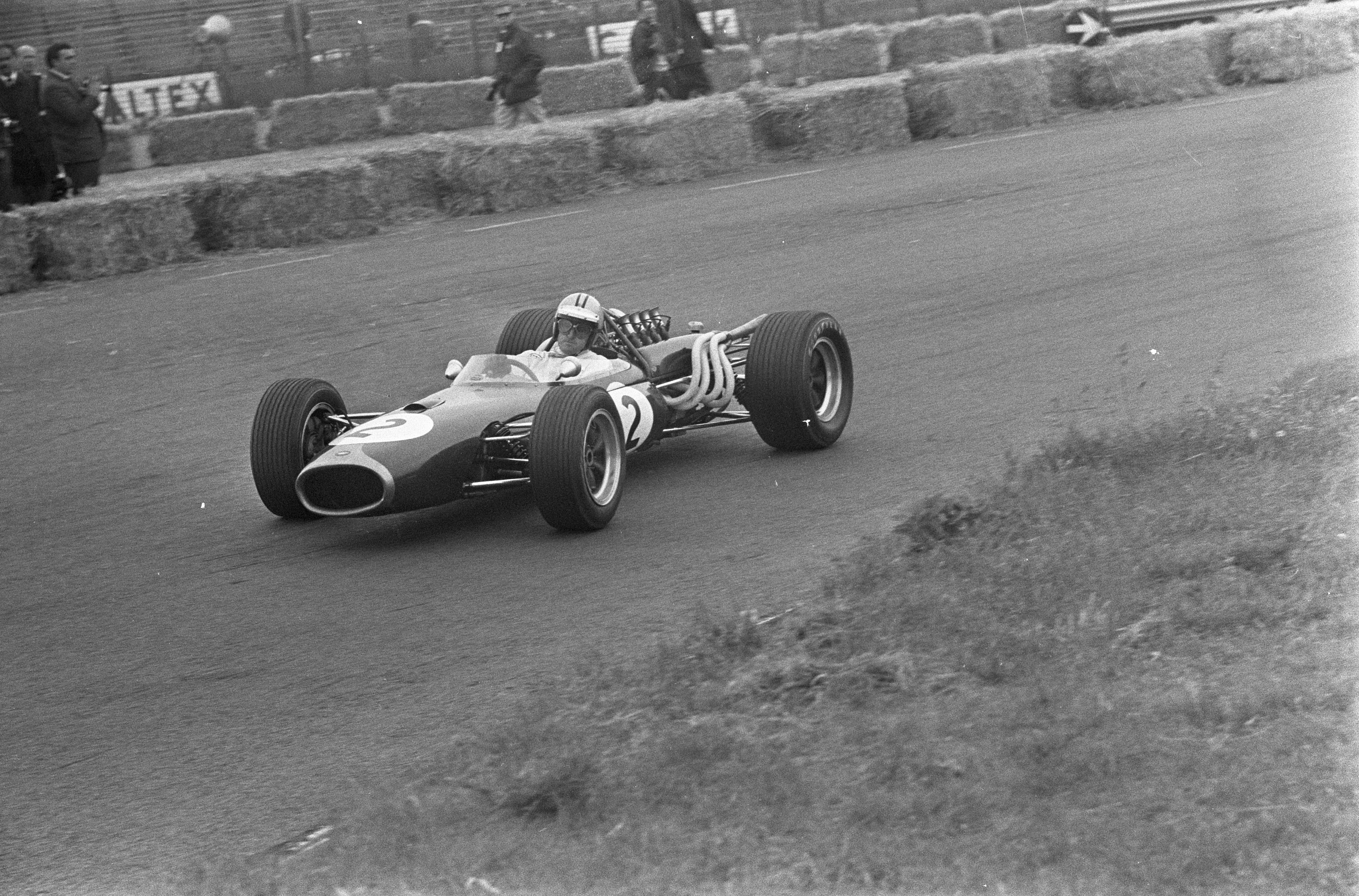
Brabham-Repco won the International Cup for F1 Manufacturers with the Brabham BT19, BT20 & BT24.

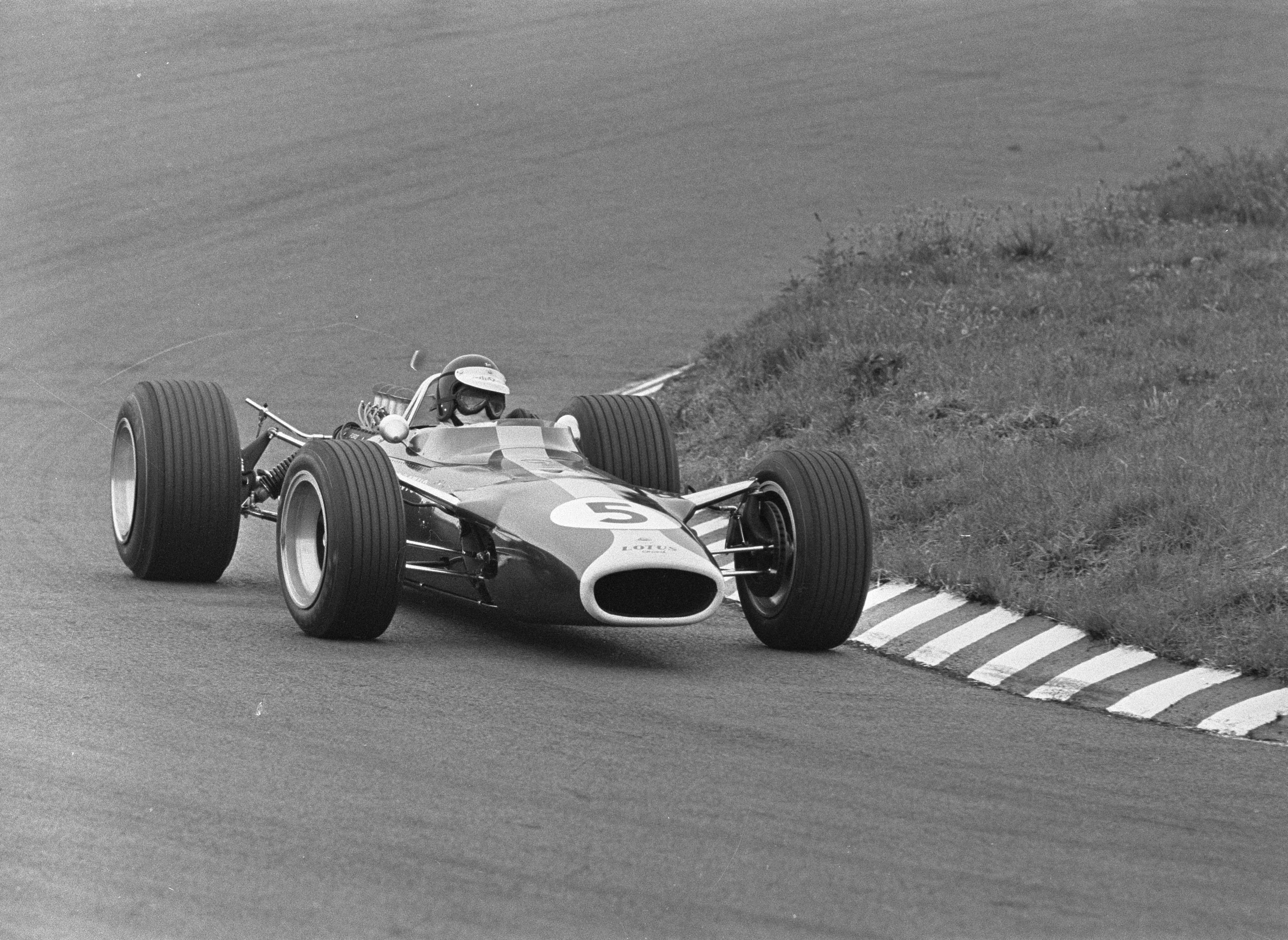
Lotus-Ford finished runner- up with the Lotus 49.

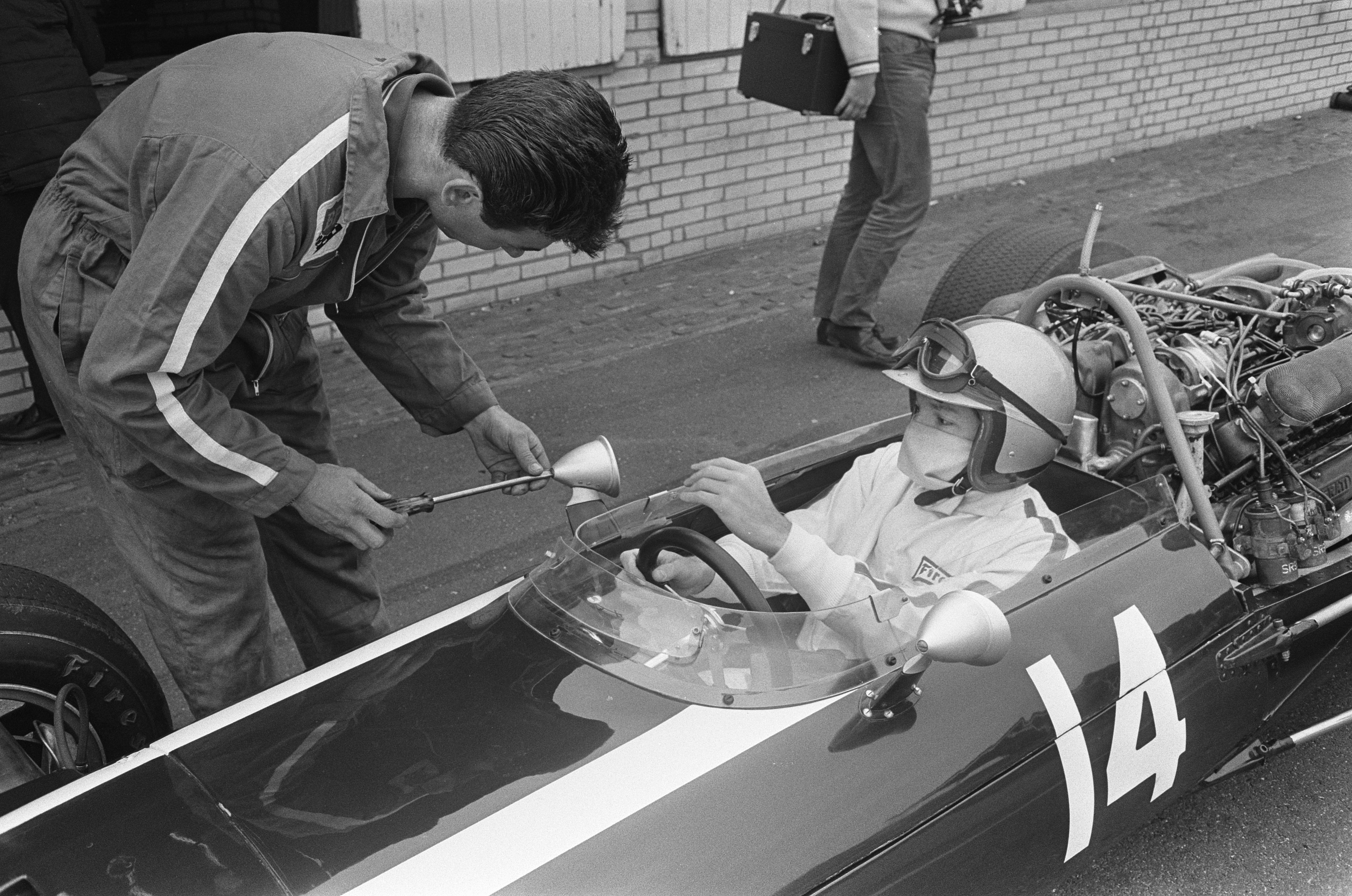
Cooper-Maserati finished third with the Cooper T81, T81B & T86.

The 1967 Formula One season was the 21st season of FIA Formula One motor racing. It featured the 18th World Championship of Drivers, the 10th International Cup for F1 Manufacturers, and six non-championship races open to Formula One cars. The World Championship was contested over eleven races between 2 January and 22 October 1967.

Denny Hulme won the Drivers' Championship in a Brabham-Repco. Brabham was also awarded the International Cup for F1 Manufacturers. As of 2025, this is the only championship won by a New Zealand driver. Hulme also became the first driver in World Championship history to win the title without having scored a pole position during the season.

Lorenzo Bandini crashed during the Monaco Grand Prix. Losing an early lead of the race and trying to get back to the front, the Ferrari driver clipped the chicane at the harbour front and then hit a hidden mooring. The car turned over and exploded in flames. It took marshals several minutes to extricate Bandini from the burning wreck and three days later, the Italian died. British driver Bob Anderson died during a test at Silverstone. His Brabham slid off the track in wet conditions and hit a marshals post, suffering serious chest and neck injuries and later dying in hospital.

== Teams and drivers ==
The following teams and drivers competed in the 1967 FIA World Championship. A pink background denotes additional Formula 2 entrants to the German Grand Prix on the very long Nürburgring track.

Entrant	Constructor	Chassis	Engine	Tyre	Driver	Rounds
(United Kingdom) Brabham Racing Organisation	Brabham-Repco	BT20	Repco 620 3.0 V8	G	(Australia) Jack Brabham	1
(United Kingdom) Brabham Racing Organisation	Brabham-Repco	BT20	Repco 620 3.0 V8	G	(New Zealand) Denny Hulme	1–3
(United Kingdom) Brabham Racing Organisation	Brabham-Repco	BT19	Repco 620 3.0 V8	G	(New Zealand) Denny Hulme	4
(United Kingdom) Brabham Racing Organisation	Brabham-Repco	BT19	Repco 740 3.0 V8	G	(Australia) Jack Brabham	2–3
(United Kingdom) Brabham Racing Organisation	Brabham-Repco	BT24	Repco 740 3.0 V8	G	(Australia) Jack Brabham	4–11
(United Kingdom) Brabham Racing Organisation	Brabham-Repco	BT24	Repco 740 3.0 V8	G	(New Zealand) Denny Hulme	5–11
(United Kingdom) Cooper Car Company	Cooper-Maserati	T81	Maserati 9/F1 3.0 V12	F	(Mexico) Pedro Rodríguez	1–7
(United Kingdom) Cooper Car Company	Cooper-Maserati	T81	Maserati 9/F1 3.0 V12	F	(United Kingdom) Alan Rees	6
(United Kingdom) Cooper Car Company	Cooper-Maserati	T81	Maserati 9/F1 3.0 V12	F	(Austria) Jochen Rindt	1–2, 8
(United Kingdom) Cooper Car Company	Cooper-Maserati	T81B	Maserati 9/F1 3.0 V12	F	(Austria) Jochen Rindt	3
(United Kingdom) Cooper Car Company	Cooper-Maserati	T81B	Maserati 10/F1 3.0 V12	F	(Austria) Jochen Rindt	4–5, 10
(United Kingdom) Cooper Car Company	Cooper-Maserati	T81B	Maserati 10/F1 3.0 V12	F	(United Kingdom) Richard Attwood	8
(United Kingdom) Cooper Car Company	Cooper-Maserati	T81B	Maserati 10/F1 3.0 V12	F	(Mexico) Pedro Rodríguez	11
(United Kingdom) Cooper Car Company	Cooper-Maserati	T81B	Maserati 10/F1 3.0 V12	F	(Belgium) Jacky Ickx	9
(United Kingdom) Cooper Car Company	Cooper-Maserati	T86	Maserati 10/F1 3.0 V12	F	(Belgium) Jacky Ickx	10
(United Kingdom) Cooper Car Company	Cooper-Maserati	T86	Maserati 10/F1 3.0 V12	F	(Austria) Jochen Rindt	6–7, 9
(United Kingdom) Owen Racing Organisation	BRM	P83	BRM P75 3.0 H16	G	(United Kingdom) Mike Spence	All
(United Kingdom) Owen Racing Organisation	BRM	P83	BRM P75 3.0 H16	G	(United Kingdom) Jackie Stewart	1, 3–4, 6
(United Kingdom) Owen Racing Organisation	BRM	P115	BRM P75 3.0 H16	G	(United Kingdom) Jackie Stewart	7–11
(United Kingdom) Owen Racing Organisation	BRM	P261	BRM P60 2.1 V8	G	(United Kingdom) Jackie Stewart	2, 5
(United Kingdom) Team Lotus	Lotus-BRM	33	BRM P60 2.1 V8	F	(United Kingdom) Graham Hill	2
(United Kingdom) Team Lotus	Lotus-BRM	43	BRM P75 3.0 H16	F	(United Kingdom) Graham Hill	1
(United Kingdom) Team Lotus	Lotus-BRM	43	BRM P75 3.0 H16	F	(United Kingdom) Jim Clark	1
(United Kingdom) Team Lotus	Lotus-Climax	33	Climax FWMV 2.0 V8	F	(United Kingdom) Jim Clark	2
(United Kingdom) Team Lotus	Lotus-Ford	49	Ford Cosworth DFV 3.0 V8	F	(United Kingdom) Jim Clark	3–11
(United Kingdom) Team Lotus	Lotus-Ford	49	Ford Cosworth DFV 3.0 V8	F	(United Kingdom) Graham Hill	3–11
(United Kingdom) Team Lotus	Lotus-Ford	49	Ford Cosworth DFV 3.0 V8	F	(Canada) Eppie Wietzes	8
(United Kingdom) Team Lotus	Lotus-Ford	49	Ford Cosworth DFV 3.0 V8	F	(Italy) Giancarlo Baghetti	9
(United Kingdom) Team Lotus	Lotus-Ford	49	Ford Cosworth DFV 3.0 V8	F	(Mexico) Moisés Solana	10–11
(United Kingdom) Team Lotus	Lotus-Ford	48	Ford Cosworth FVA 1.6 L4	F	(United Kingdom) Jackie Oliver	7
(United States) Anglo American Racers	Eagle-Climax	T1F	Climax FPF 2.8 L4	G	(United States) Dan Gurney	1
(United States) Anglo American Racers	Eagle-Weslake	T1G	Weslake 58 3.0 V12	G	(United States) Dan Gurney	2–11
(United States) Anglo American Racers	Eagle-Weslake	T1G	Weslake 58 3.0 V12	G	(United States) Richie Ginther	2
(United States) Anglo American Racers	Eagle-Weslake	T1G	Weslake 58 3.0 V12	G	(New Zealand) Bruce McLaren	5–7
(United States) Anglo American Racers	Eagle-Weslake	T1G	Weslake 58 3.0 V12	G	(Italy) Ludovico Scarfiotti	9
(Japan) Honda Racing	Honda	RA273	Honda RA273E 3.0 V12	F	(United Kingdom) John Surtees	1–4, 6–7
(Japan) Honda Racing	Honda	RA300	Honda RA273E 3.0 V12	F	(United Kingdom) John Surtees	9–11
(United Kingdom) Rob Walker/Jack Durlacher Racing Team	Cooper-Maserati	T81	Maserati 9/F1 3.0 V12	F	(Switzerland) Jo Siffert	All
(United Kingdom) DW Racing Enterprises	Brabham-Climax	BT11	Climax FPF 2.8 L4	F	(United Kingdom) Bob Anderson	1–4, 6
(United Kingdom) DW Racing Enterprises	Brabham-Climax	BT11	Climax FPF 2.8 L4	D	(United Kingdom) Bob Anderson	5
(Switzerland) Joakim Bonnier Racing Team	Cooper-Maserati	T81	Maserati 9/F1 3.0 V12	F	(Sweden) Jo Bonnier	1, 4, 6–11
(United Kingdom) Reg Parnell Racing	Lotus-BRM	25	BRM P60 2.1 V8	F	(United Kingdom) Piers Courage	1
(United Kingdom) Reg Parnell Racing	Lotus-BRM	25	BRM P60 2.1 V8	F	(United Kingdom) Chris Irwin	3
(United Kingdom) Reg Parnell Racing	BRM	P261	BRM P60 2.1 V8	F	(United Kingdom) Piers Courage	2
(United Kingdom) Reg Parnell Racing	BRM	P261	BRM P66 3.0 H16	F	(United Kingdom) Piers Courage	6
(United Kingdom) Reg Parnell Racing	BRM	P261	BRM P66 3.0 H16	F	(United Kingdom) Chris Irwin	4, 6
(United Kingdom) Reg Parnell Racing	BRM	P83	BRM P75 3.0 H16	F	(United Kingdom) Chris Irwin	5, 7–11
(Rhodesia) John Love	Cooper-Climax	T79	Climax FPF 2.8 L4	D	(Rhodesia) John Love	1
(Rhodesia) Sam Tingle	LDS-Climax	Mk 3	Climax FPF 2.8 L4	D	(Rhodesia) Sam Tingle	1
(South Africa) Scuderia Scribante	Brabham-Climax	BT11	Climax FPF 2.8 L4	F	(South Africa) Dave Charlton	1
(South Africa) Luki Botha	Brabham-Climax	BT11	Climax FPF 2.8 L4	D	(South Africa) Luki Botha	1
(France) Matra Sports	Matra-Ford	MS5	Ford Cosworth FVA 1.6 L4	D	(France) Johnny Servoz-Gavin	2
(France) Matra Sports	Matra-Ford	MS5	Ford Cosworth FVA 1.6 L4	D	(France) Jean-Pierre Beltoise	2
(France) Matra Sports	Matra-Ford	MS7	Ford Cosworth FVA 1.6 L4	G	(France) Jean-Pierre Beltoise	10–11
(United Kingdom) Bruce McLaren Motor Racing	McLaren-BRM	M4B	BRM P111 2.1 V8	G	(New Zealand) Bruce McLaren	2–3
(United Kingdom) Bruce McLaren Motor Racing	McLaren-BRM	M5A	BRM P101 3.0 V12	G	(New Zealand) Bruce McLaren	8–11
(Italy) Scuderia Ferrari SpA SEFAC	Ferrari	312/67	Ferrari 242 3.0 V12	F	(Italy) Lorenzo Bandini	2
(Italy) Scuderia Ferrari SpA SEFAC	Ferrari	312/67	Ferrari 242 3.0 V12	F	(New Zealand) Chris Amon	2–11
(Italy) Scuderia Ferrari SpA SEFAC	Ferrari	312/67	Ferrari 242 3.0 V12	F	(United Kingdom) Jonathan Williams	11
(Italy) Scuderia Ferrari SpA SEFAC	Ferrari	312/67	Ferrari 242 3.0 V12	F	(Italy) Ludovico Scarfiotti	3–4
(Italy) Scuderia Ferrari SpA SEFAC	Ferrari	312	Ferrari 242 3.0 V12	F	(United Kingdom) Mike Parkes	3–4
(France) Guy Ligier	Cooper-Maserati	T81	Maserati 9/F1 3.0 V12	F	(France) Guy Ligier	4–5
(France) Guy Ligier	Brabham-Repco	BT20	Repco 620 3.0 V8	F	(France) Guy Ligier	6–7, 9–11
(United Kingdom) Bernard White Racing	BRM	P261	BRM P60 2.1 V8	G	(United Kingdom) David Hobbs	6, 8
(Switzerland) Charles Vögele Racing	Cooper-ATS	T77	ATS 2.7 V8	D	(Switzerland) Silvio Moser	6
(West Germany) Bayerische Motoren Werke AG	Lola-BMW	T100	BMW M10 2.0 L4	D	(West Germany) Hubert Hahne	7
(West Germany) Gerhard Mitter	Brabham-Ford	BT23	Ford Cosworth FVA 1.6 L4	D	(West Germany) Gerhard Mitter	7
(United Kingdom) Roy Winkelmann Racing	Brabham-Ford	BT23	Ford Cosworth FVA 1.6 L4	F	(United Kingdom) Alan Rees	7
Ecurie Ford-France	Matra-Ford	MS5	Ford Cosworth FVA 1.6 L4	F	(France) Jo Schlesser	7
(United Kingdom) Ron Harris Racing Team	Protos-Ford	F2	Ford Cosworth FVA 1.6 L4	F	(United Kingdom) Brian Hart	7
(United Kingdom) Ron Harris Racing Team	Protos-Ford	F2	Ford Cosworth FVA 1.6 L4	F	(West Germany) Kurt Ahrens Jr.	7
(United Kingdom) Lola Cars	Lola-BMW	T100	BMW M10 2.0 L4	F	(United Kingdom) David Hobbs	7
(United Kingdom) David Bridges	Lola-Ford	T100	Ford Cosworth FVA 1.6 L4	D	(United Kingdom) Brian Redman	7
(United Kingdom) Tyrrell Racing Organisation	Matra-Ford	MS5	Ford Cosworth FVA 1.6 L4	D	(Belgium) Jacky Ickx	7
(United States) Mike Fisher	Lotus-BRM	33	BRM P60 2.1 V8	F	(United States) Mike Fisher	8, 11
(Canada) Castrol Oils Ltd	Eagle-Climax	T1F	Climax FPF 2.8 L4	G	(Canada) Al Pease	8
(United States) Tom Jones	Cooper-Climax	T82	Climax FWMV 2.0 V8	F	(United States) Tom Jones	8

=== Team and driver changes ===
- After his success in the 1966 24 Hours of Le Mans, Chris Amon was offered a seat at the Ferrari F1 team. It would be the New Zealander's first full-time F1 drive since 1964.
- Pedro Rodríguez was signed by Cooper, after 1964 champion John Surtees moved to Honda. Honda's 1966 drivers Richie Ginther and Ronnie Bucknum left the sport.
- 1962 champion Graham Hill moved from BRM to Lotus, replacing Peter Arundell. Mike Spence was hired as his replacement at BRM, having gained experience with their V8 engine at Reg Parnell's privateer team.

==== Mid-season changes ====
- Ferrari driver Lorenzo Bandini suffered a fatal crash during the Monaco Grand Prix. The team brought back last year's drivers Mike Parkes and Ludovico Scarfiotti for two races and then reduced their operations to just one car for Chris Amon.
- Bruce McLaren had switched from Ford to BRM engines over the winter. He was supposed to get V12 engines for the McLaren M5A, but when those were delayed, he had to start the season in a modified Formula Two car powered by a BRM V8.
- After having worked with engine suppliers Climax and BRM since 1966, Lotus switched to newly developed Cosworth DFV's from the third race of this year. The project was funded by the Ford Motor Company.
- Pedro Rodríguez suffered a crash in the 1967 Mediterranean Grand Prix, a Formula Two race at Autodromo di Pergusa, and took about two months to recover. Richard Attwood and Jacky Ickx fell in for him at Cooper. It was Ickx's F1 debut, while he would go on to win the F2 championship that year as well.
- Matra introduced their first Formula One chassis, the MS7, in the last two races of the season, with their Formula Two driver Jean-Pierre Beltoise granted the drive.

== Calendar ==
Round	Grand Prix	Circuit	Date
1	South African Grand Prix	(South Africa) Kyalami Grand Prix Circuit, Midrand	2 January
2	Monaco Grand Prix	Circuit de Monaco, Monte Carlo	7 May
3	Dutch Grand Prix	(Netherlands) Circuit Zandvoort, Zandvoort	4 June
4	Belgian Grand Prix	(Belgium) Circuit de Spa-Francorchamps, Stavelot	18 June
5	French Grand Prix	(France) Bugatti Circuit, Le Mans	2 July
6	British Grand Prix	(United Kingdom) Silverstone Circuit, Silverstone	15 July
7	German Grand Prix	(West Germany) Nürburgring, Nürburg	6 August
8	Canadian Grand Prix	(Canada) Mosport Park, Bowmanville	27 August
9	Italian Grand Prix	(Italy) Autodromo Nazionale di Monza, Monza	10 September
10	United States Grand Prix	(United States) Watkins Glen International, New York	1 October
11	Mexican Grand Prix	Magdalena Mixhuca, Mexico City	22 October

=== Calendar changes ===
- The South African Grand Prix returned to the calendar but it was held at the Kyalami Circuit instead of the Prince George Circuit.
- The Dutch Grand Prix was brought forward from mid July to early June, ahead of the Belgian and French Grand Prix.
- The French Grand Prix was moved to the Bugatti version of the Circuit de la Sarthe, replacing Reims-Gueux.
- The British Grand Prix was moved from Brands Hatch to Silverstone, in keeping with the event-sharing arrangement between the two circuits.
- The Canadian Grand Prix was hosted for the first time, at Mosport Park near Toronto.

== Regulation changes ==
After Lorenzo Bandini's fatal accident, the FIA banned circuit organisers from using straw bales along the track and TV crews from flying their helicopters too low, as both had contributed to the fire flaring up.

== Championship report ==
=== Rounds 1 to 4 ===
Coming down from his third World Championship in 1966, Jack Brabham started this year off as well, with a pole position at the South African Grand Prix. Teammate Denny Hulme started second and two-time World Champion Jim Clark lined up in third in his Lotus. Hulme took the lead at the start, while Clark fell back to sixth. In a race of attrition, the crowd saw Rhodesian driver John Love take the lead. When he had to stop for extra fuel, however, it was Pedro Rodríguez who won in his Cooper. Love finished second, ahead of John Surtees in a Honda. Hulme and Brabham finished several laps down but still in the points, since there were just six classified finishers in total.

From 1967 to 1969, there was four months between the first and second race of the championship, and most teams would usually run the first race with old designs, or not even participate. This year, Ferrari, McLaren and Matra started their year with the Monaco Grand Prix. Lotus had planned to run revolutionary new Cosworths, but they were not ready in time. Jack Brabham scored pole position like in South Africa, but again lost the lead at the start, this time to long-time Ferrari driver Lorenzo Bandini. Before long, Hulme took over at the front and increased his lead to 15 seconds. Desperately trying to get closer, Bandini struck the barrier in the chicane at the harbour front and mounted the straw bales. The car landed upside down and exploded in flames. Bandini would succumbed to his injuries three days later. Hulme won the race, one lap ahead of Graham Hill (Lotus) and two ahead of Chris Amon (Ferrari). Like in the first race, there were just six finishers.

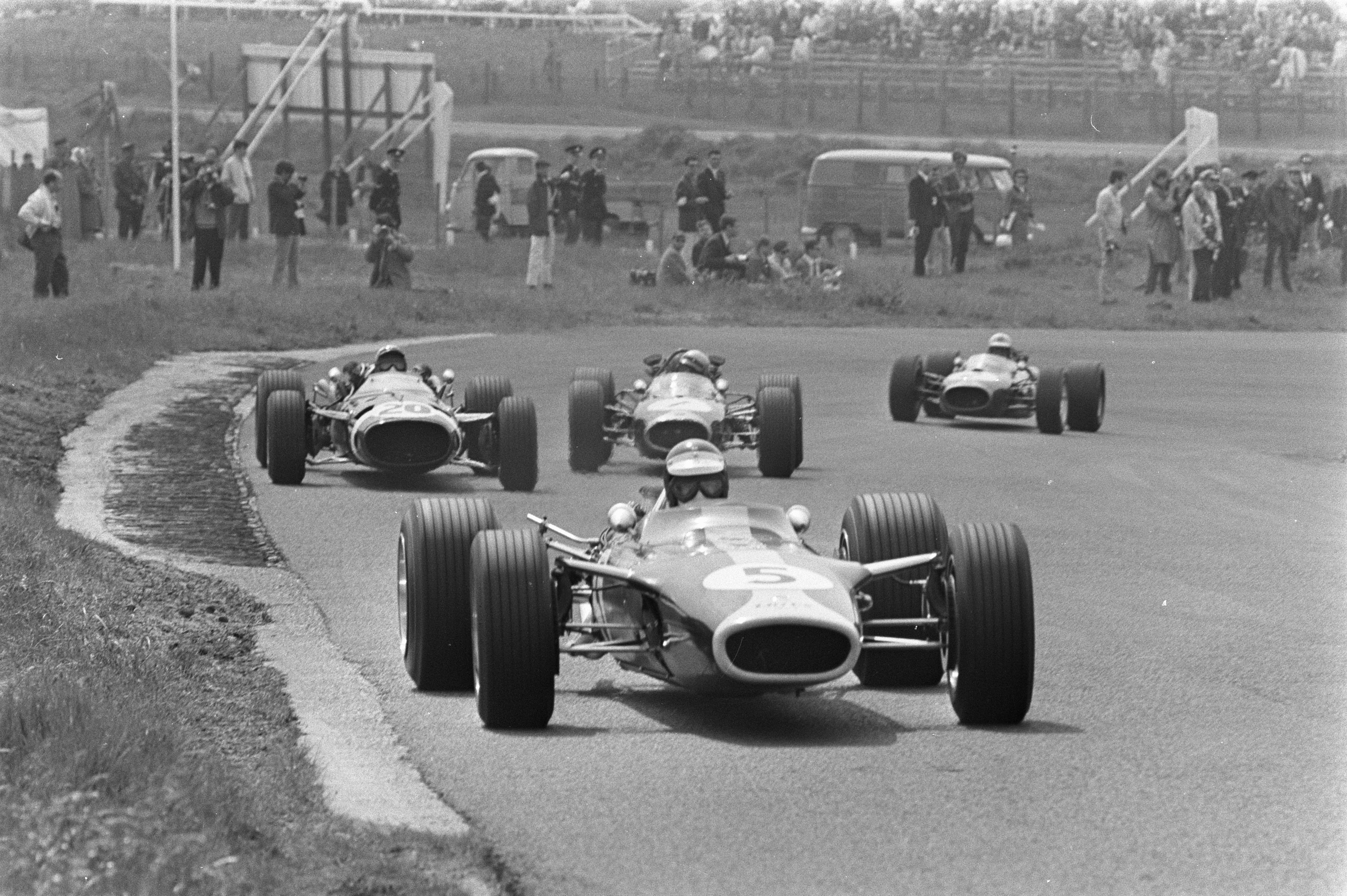
Jim Clark, on his way to win the Dutch Grand Prix

When Lotus could finally run the new Cosworth engines in the Dutch Grand Prix, their pace was significantly better than before and Hill snatched pole position. A surprising Dan Gurney in the Eagle started second, reigning champion Brabham in third. After drivers had to avoid a wandering marshal on the grid, the positions at the front remained rather the same, until Gurney made a pit stop. Hill's engine suddenly seized on lap 11, but teammate Clark was charging, getting up to second on lap 15 and taking the lead from Brabham on the next lap. He kept increasing his lead with a second per lap and easily won, ahead of the teammates Brabham and Hulme. Behind them finished the three Ferraris.

Qualifying for the Belgian Grand Prix ended up with quite the same drivers at the front, except Brabham could only manage seventh. Clark, Gurney and Hill occupied the front row. Clark was the only one of the three with a good start, however. During the first lap, Mike Parkes crashed his Ferrari and was thrown out. He broke a leg and wrist and would not return to Formula One. At the front of the field, Clark was followed by Stewart (BRM) and Amon (Ferrari), before Amon fell back and Gurney took third. Then, Clark had to pit to change a spark plug and Stewart ran into trouble with his gearbox, and Gurney took the lead. After setting a new lap record, the American driver won, over a minute ahead of Stewart and Amon.

Four different winners led to a close fight at the top of the Drivers' Championship. Denny Hulme (Brabham) was first with 16 points, ahead of Pedro Rodríguez (Cooper) and Chris Amon (Ferrari) with 11. In the battle for the Manufacturers' Cup, Brabham had scored 18 points, ahead of Cooper (14) and Ferrari (11).

=== Rounds 5 to 7 ===
For the French Grand Prix, the front row consisted of 1962 champion Graham Hill (Lotus), triple World Champion Jack Brabham (Brabham) and winner of the last race, Dan Gurney (Eagle). But after just 5 laps, it was fourth-starting Jim Clark who led the field. Before the race reached half distance, however, both Lotuses had retired. The Cosworth engines deemed fast but unreliable. After Gurney retired as well with a fuel leak, which left Brabham and his teammate Hulme to finish first and second. Jackie Stewart finished third in his BRM, a lap down on the leader. For the third time this year, there were just six classified finishers.

The British Grand Prix was run at Silverstone and saw the green-and-yellow Lotuses (Clark ahead of Hill) qualifying in front of the green-and-gold Brabhams (Brabham ahead of Hulme). The Lotus duo gained a big lead over the rest, before Hill took the lead on lap 26. When a screw in his suspension failed, however, he had to pit on lap 55, and his engine seized ten laps later. Clark took a comfortable win, ahead of Hulme and Amon, the Ferrari driver having passed Brabham four laps from the end.

During practice for the German Grand Prix, Hill crashed and wrote off his Lotus, while escaping uninjured. Clark clinched pole position, ahead of Hulme and Formula Two driver Jacky Ickx. (Traditionally, the F2 race would be run at the same time as the Grand Prix. F2 drivers would not be eligible to score points for the F1 championship.) At the start, Clark and Hulme led away, with Bruce McLaren stealing third. On lap 3, Clark's right-rear wheel was deflating slowly and he had to back off. Dan Gurney inherited the lead after McLaren retired with an oil leak. The American set a new lap record, despite an extra chicane having been added to the circuit, and increased his lead over Hulme to over 40 seconds. On lap 13, however, his Eagle's drive shaft broke and cut through an oil pipe, handing Hulme a lucky victory, ahead of teammate Brabham and Ferrari driver Amon.

In the Drivers' Championship, Denny Hulme (Brabham) was leading with 37 points, ahead of Jack Brabham (Brabham) with 25 points and Jim Clark (Lotus) and Chris Amon (Ferrari) in a shared third place with 19 points. Brabham was leading the championship for the Manufacturers' Cup with 42 points, ahead of Cooper with 21 and Lotus and Ferrari in a shared third place with 19 points.

=== Rounds 8 to 11 ===
The Canadian Grand Prix was on the championship calendar for the first time and was supposed to be a one-off in celebration of Canada's 100 years of independence, but the popularity of the event would result in F1 returning to Mosport Park seven more years and the Canadian GP still being featured on the calendar today. Jim Clark (Lotus) qualified on pole position, ahead of teammate Graham Hill and championship leader Denny Hulme (Brabham). It had been a rainy night, but a clear morning, which led to most of the Goodyear runners starting on intermediate tyres, while most of the Firestone started on dries. During the warm-up lap, the rain returned and it caused a treacherous first lap, with the Goodyear tyres at an advantage. Hulme took the lead off of Clark, and Bruce McLaren got by the pole-sitter into second place. The track was now drying and around a quarter of the race, the dry-runners regained their advantage. Clark retook second place and began to catch Hulme at over a second a lap. On lap 58, he was there and immediately went by into the lead, but right at that moment, the rain returned. Clark's engine got soaked and cut out, while Hulme desperately needed clean goggles so chose to pit. This left Jack Brabham, second in the championship, free to win the race, over a minute ahead of teammate Hulme and at least a lap ahead of the race. Dan Gurney finished third in the Eagle.

Qualifying for the Italian Grand Prix was disrupted by rain, but the result was not surprising: Clark scored his fifth pole position of the year, ahead of Brabham and McLaren. Hulme started in sixth. The marshal starting the race used a different procedure to what the drivers were used to, which led to half of the grid essentially doing a false start, but no penalties were issued. Brabham took the lead before Gurney grabbed it later in the lap, while Hill and Clark followed them. On lap 3, Clark was already back in the lead, but then suffered a slow puncture. With the pole-sitter in the pits and Gurney's engine having broken, as it had done so many times, it was Hulme who took over the lead. Brabham and Hill formed a close trio with him and the lead swapped hands a couple of times. Clark had a lost a full lap with his pit stop, but managed to unlap himself with two thirds of the race still to go, and quickly set a new lap record. Hulme retired with an overheating engine and Hill took advantage from Clark's slipstream to open up the gap to Brabham at two seconds per lap, until on lap 58, his engine exploded. His rivals' retirements, topped with his maniacal pace, brought Clark up to second place, with leader Brabham in his sights and Honda driver John Surtees in third place, the 1964 champion this time being the one to benefit from Clark's tow. On lap 60, Clark grabbed the lead and gained a three-second advantage, until he dramatically ran out of fuel. Surtees took the lead and was side-by-side with Brabham going into the last corner. Brabham dove to the inside but slid wide. Surtees crossed back and took the flag with a margin of just 0.2 seconds. It would be Honda's last win until 2006. Clark coasted over the line in third place.

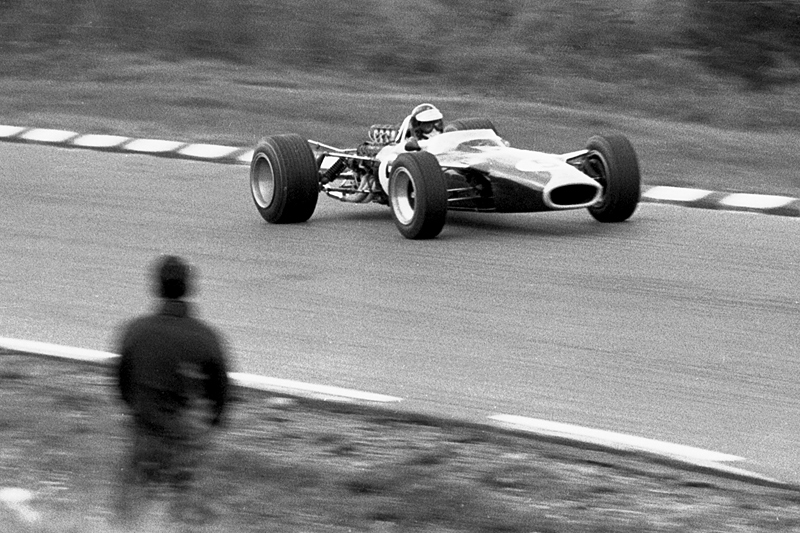
Jim Clark, on his way to win the United States Grand Prix

The Brabham duo (Hulme and Brabham) were leading the championship but the Lotus duo (Hill and Clark) that occupied the first row for the United States Grand Prix. Gurney had started beside them, took second place at the start and even started pressuring the leader. After just 24 laps, however, the home hero retired with a broken suspension, but the Lotuses were showing better pace anyway. Clark took over the lead when Hill suffered issues with his clutch. This gave Ferrari driver Chris Amon a chance for second place, but his engine ran out of oil with 12 laps to go. Clark would take a comfortable victory, but two laps from the end, his right-rear suspension broke. By slowing down and managing to keep the car on track, Hill could not catch up in time, and Clark took the chequered flag. One could say it was the summary of the season: the Lotuses were unreliable and finished less than half of the races, but if they did, they were so fast that they lapped the rest of the field. This time, it was Hulme who finished in third, a lap down.

Going into the final race, the Mexican Grand Prix, Hulme had a lead of five points in the standings, so if Brabham wanted to do anything about it, he needed to win and for his teammate to finish fifth or lower. Clark started again on pole position, with Brabham and Hulme down in fifth and sixth, respectively. Hill shortly took the lead, but Clark grabbed it back and grew his advantage to seven seconds. Hulme was comfortably hanging back six seconds behind Brabham. Hill retired when his drive shaft broke and had damaged his engine, and the race settled down. Clark set a new lap record and lapped everyone but Brabham in second. Hulme finished third, enough to win the title.

Denny Hulme (Brabham, 51 points) won his first and only championship, ahead of teammate Jack Brabham (46) and Jim Clark (Lotus, 41). Hulme is the only champion to date from New Zealand, and the first of two drivers to win the title without achieving a pole position in the season. Only Niki Lauda would repeat this feat in 1984. The Brabham team (63 points) also won the Manufacturers' Cup, ahead of Lotus (44) and Cooper (28).

== Results and standings ==
=== Grands Prix ===
Round	Grand Prix	Pole position	Fastest lap	Winning driver	Winning constructor	Tyre	Report
1	(South Africa) South African Grand Prix	(Australia) Jack Brabham	(New Zealand) Denny Hulme	(Mexico) Pedro Rodríguez	(United Kingdom) Cooper-Maserati	F	Report
2	Monaco Grand Prix	(Australia) Jack Brabham	(United Kingdom) Jim Clark	(New Zealand) Denny Hulme	(United Kingdom) Brabham-Repco	G	Report
3	(Netherlands) Dutch Grand Prix	(United Kingdom) Graham Hill	(United Kingdom) Jim Clark	(United Kingdom) Jim Clark	(United Kingdom) Lotus-Ford	F	Report
4	(Belgium) Belgian Grand Prix	(United Kingdom) Jim Clark	(United States) Dan Gurney	(United States) Dan Gurney	(United States) Eagle-Weslake	G	Report
5	(France) French Grand Prix	(United Kingdom) Graham Hill	(United Kingdom) Graham Hill	(Australia) Jack Brabham	(United Kingdom) Brabham-Repco	G	Report
6	(United Kingdom) British Grand Prix	(United Kingdom) Jim Clark	(New Zealand) Denny Hulme	(United Kingdom) Jim Clark	(United Kingdom) Lotus-Ford	F	Report
7	(West Germany) German Grand Prix	(United Kingdom) Jim Clark	(United States) Dan Gurney	(New Zealand) Denny Hulme	(United Kingdom) Brabham-Repco	G	Report
8	(Canada) Canadian Grand Prix	(United Kingdom) Jim Clark	(United Kingdom) Jim Clark	(Australia) Jack Brabham	(United Kingdom) Brabham-Repco	G	Report
9	(Italy) Italian Grand Prix	(United Kingdom) Jim Clark	(United Kingdom) Jim Clark	(United Kingdom) John Surtees	(Japan) Honda	F	Report
10	United States Grand Prix	(United Kingdom) Graham Hill	(United Kingdom) Graham Hill	(United Kingdom) Jim Clark	(United Kingdom) Lotus-Ford	F	Report
11	(Mexico) Mexican Grand Prix	(United Kingdom) Jim Clark	(United Kingdom) Jim Clark	(United Kingdom) Jim Clark	(United Kingdom) Lotus-Ford	F	Report

=== Scoring system ===
Points were awarded to the top six classified finishers. Formula 2 cars were not eligible for Championship points. The International Cup for F1 Manufacturers only counted the points of the highest-finishing driver for each race. For both the Championship and the Cup, the best five results from rounds 1-6 and the best four results from rounds 7-11 were counted.

Numbers without parentheses are championship points; numbers in parentheses are total points scored. Points were awarded in the following system:

Position	1st	2nd	3rd	4th	5th	6th
Race	9	6	4	3	2	1

=== World Drivers' Championship standings ===
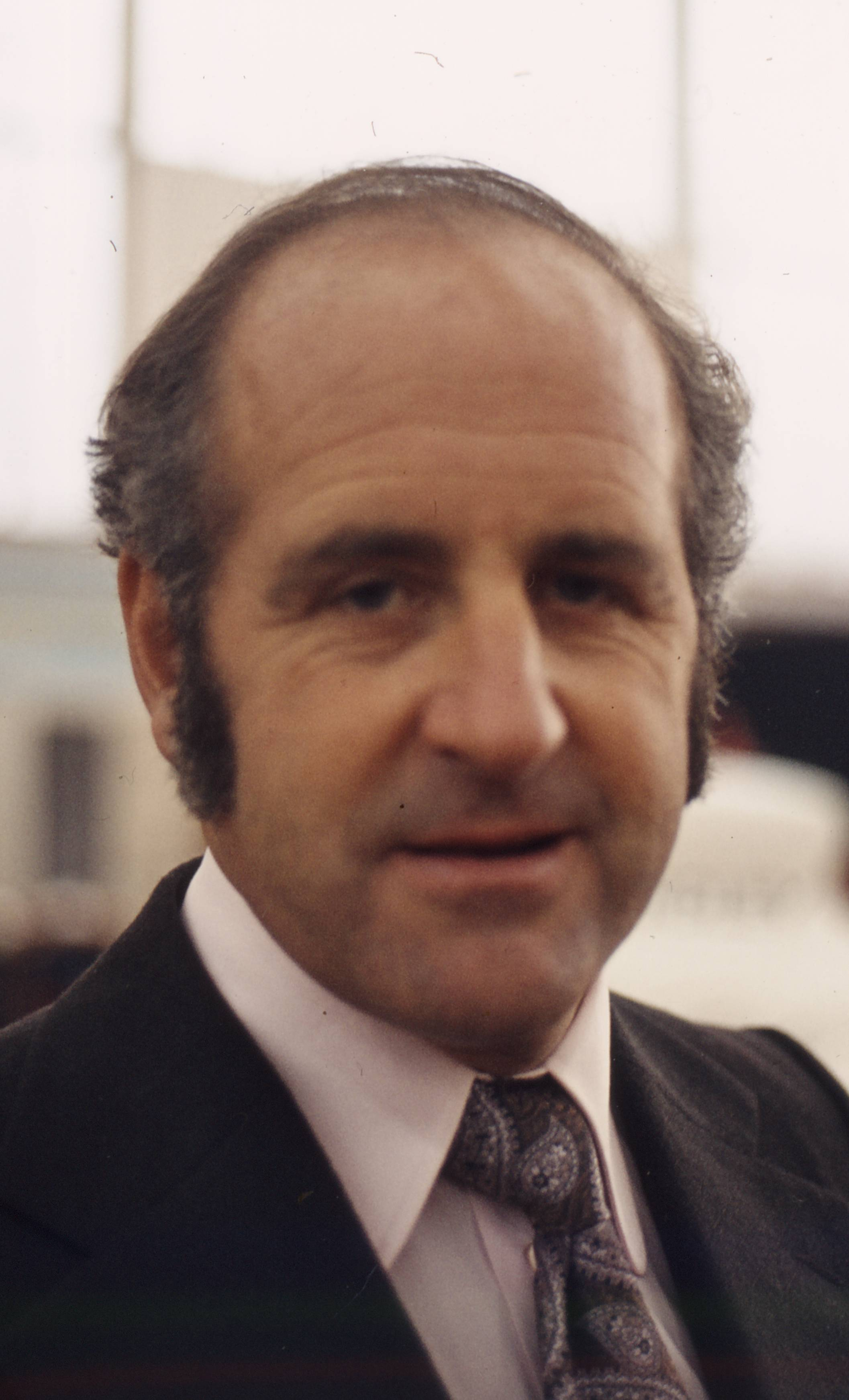
New Zealander Denny Hulme (pictured in 1973) won the Drivers' Championship, driving for Brabham

Pos.	Driver	RSA (South Africa)	MON (Monaco)	NED (Netherlands)	BEL (Belgium)	FRA (France)	GBR (United Kingdom)	GER (West Germany)	CAN (Canada)	ITA (Italy)	USA (United States)	MEX (Mexico)	Pts.
1	(New Zealand) Denny Hulme	4^{F}	1	3	Ret	2	2^{F}	1	2	Ret	3	3	51
2	(Australia) Jack Brabham	6^{P}	Ret^{P}	2	Ret	1	4	2	1	2	(5)	2	46 (48)
3	(United Kingdom) Jim Clark	Ret	Ret^{F}	1^{F}	6^{P}	Ret	1^{P}	Ret^{P}	Ret^{P}^{F}	3^{P}^{F}	1	1^{P}^{F}	41
4	(United Kingdom) John Surtees	3	Ret	Ret	Ret		6	4		1	Ret	4	20
5	(New Zealand) Chris Amon		3	4	3	Ret	3	3	6	7	Ret	9	20
6	(Mexico) Pedro Rodríguez	1	5	Ret	9	6	5	11				6	15
7	(United Kingdom) Graham Hill	Ret	2	Ret^{P}	Ret	Ret^{P}^{F}	Ret	Ret	4	Ret	2^{P}^{F}	Ret	15
8	(United States) Dan Gurney	Ret	Ret	Ret	1^{F}	Ret	Ret	Ret^{F}	3	Ret	Ret	Ret	13
9	(United Kingdom) Jackie Stewart	Ret	Ret	Ret	2	3	Ret	Ret	Ret	Ret	Ret	Ret	10
10	(United Kingdom) Mike Spence	Ret	6	8	5	Ret	Ret	Ret	5	5	Ret	5	9
11	(Rhodesia) John Love	2											6
12	(Switzerland) Jo Siffert	Ret	Ret	10	7	4	Ret	Ret	DNS	Ret	4	12	6
13	(Austria) Jochen Rindt	Ret	Ret	Ret	4	Ret	Ret	Ret	Ret	4	Ret		6
14	(New Zealand) Bruce McLaren		4	Ret		Ret	Ret	Ret	7	Ret	Ret	Ret	3
15	(Sweden) Jo Bonnier	Ret			Ret		Ret	6	8	Ret	6	10	3
16	(United Kingdom) Chris Irwin			7	Ret	5	7	9	Ret	Ret	Ret	Ret	2
17	(United Kingdom) Bob Anderson	5	DNQ	9	8	Ret	Ret						2
18	(United Kingdom) Mike Parkes			5	Ret								2
19	(France) Guy Ligier				10	NC	10	8		Ret	Ret	11	1
20	(Italy) Ludovico Scarfiotti			6	NC					Ret			1
21	(Belgium) Jacky Ickx							Ret^{1}		6	Ret		1
—	(France) Jean-Pierre Beltoise		DNQ								7	7	0
—	(United Kingdom) David Hobbs						8	10^{1}	9				0
—	(United Kingdom) Jonathan Williams											8	0
—	(United Kingdom) Alan Rees						9	7^{1}					0
—	(United Kingdom) Richard Attwood								10				0
—	(United States) Mike Fisher								11			DNS	0
—	(South Africa) Dave Charlton	NC											0
—	(South Africa) Luki Botha	NC											0
—	(Canada) Al Pease								NC				0
—	(United Kingdom) Piers Courage	Ret	Ret				DNS						0
—	(Mexico) Moisés Solana										Ret	Ret	0
—	(Rhodesia) Sam Tingle	Ret											0
—	(Italy) Lorenzo Bandini†		Ret†										0
—	(France) Johnny Servoz-Gavin		Ret										0
—	(Switzerland) Silvio Moser						Ret						0
—	(West Germany) Hubert Hahne							Ret					0
—	(Italy) Giancarlo Baghetti									Ret			0
—	(Canada) Eppie Wietzes								DSQ				0
—	(United States) Tom Jones								DNQ				0
—	(United States) Richie Ginther		DNQ										0
Drivers ineligible for Formula One points, because they drove with Formula Two cars
—	(United Kingdom) Jackie Oliver							5					
—	(United Kingdom) Brian Hart							NC					
—	(West Germany) Kurt Ahrens Jr.							Ret					
—	(France) Jo Schlesser							Ret					
—	(West Germany) Gerhard Mitter							Ret					
—	(United Kingdom) Brian Redman							DNS					
Pos.	Driver	RSA (South Africa)	MON (Monaco)	NED (Netherlands)	BEL (Belgium)	FRA (France)	GBR (United Kingdom)	GER (West Germany)	CAN (Canada)	ITA (Italy)	USA (United States)	MEX (Mexico)	Pts.

Key
Colour	Result
Gold	Winner
Silver	Second place
Bronze	Third place
Green	Other points position
Blue	Other classified position
Blue	Not classified, finished (NC)
Purple	Not classified, retired (Ret)
Red	Did not qualify (DNQ)
Black	Disqualified (DSQ)
White	Did not start (DNS)
White	Race cancelled (C)
Blank	Did not practice (DNP)
Blank	Excluded (EX)
Blank	Did not arrive (DNA)
Blank	Withdrawn (WD)
Blank	Did not enter (empty cell)
Annotation	Meaning
P	Pole position
F	Fastest lap

- ^{1} – Ineligible for Formula One points, because they drove with Formula Two cars.

=== International Cup for F1 Manufacturers standings ===
Pos.	Manufacturer	RSA (South Africa)	MON (Monaco)	NED (Netherlands)	BEL (Belgium)	FRA (France)	GBR (United Kingdom)	GER (West Germany)	CAN (Canada)	ITA (Italy)	USA (United States)	MEX (Mexico)	Pts.
1	(United Kingdom) Brabham-Repco	4	1	2	Ret	1	2	1	1	2	(3)	2	63 (67)
2	(United Kingdom) Lotus-Ford			1	6	Ret	1	Ret	4	3	1	1	44
3	(United Kingdom) Cooper-Maserati	1	5	10	4	4	5	6	8	4	4	6	28
4	(Japan) Honda	3	Ret	Ret	Ret		6	4		1	Ret	4	20
5	(Italy) Ferrari		3	4	3	Ret	3	3	6	7	Ret	8	20
6	(United Kingdom) BRM	Ret	6	8	2	3	7	9	5	5	Ret	5	17
7	(United States) Eagle-Weslake		Ret	Ret	1	Ret	Ret	Ret	3	Ret	Ret	Ret	13
8	(United Kingdom) Lotus-BRM	Ret	2	7					11			DNS	6
9	(United Kingdom) Cooper-Climax	2							DNQ				6
10	(United Kingdom) McLaren-BRM		4	Ret					7	Ret	Ret	Ret	3
11	(United Kingdom) Brabham-Climax	5	DNQ	9	8	Ret	Ret						2
—	(France) Matra-Ford		Ret								7	7	0
—	(United States) Eagle-Climax	Ret							NC				0
—	(South Africa) LDS-Climax	Ret											0
—	(United Kingdom) Lotus-Climax		Ret										0
—	(United Kingdom) Cooper-ATS						Ret						0
—	(United Kingdom) Lola-BMW							Ret					0
Pos.	Manufacturer	RSA (South Africa)	MON (Monaco)	NED (Netherlands)	BEL (Belgium)	FRA (France)	GBR (United Kingdom)	GER (West Germany)	CAN (Canada)	ITA (Italy)	USA (United States)	MEX (Mexico)	Pts.

- Bold results counted to championship totals.

== Non-championship races ==
Other Formula One races held in 1967, which did not count towards the World Championship.

Race name	Circuit	Date	Winning driver	Constructor	Report
(United Kingdom) II Race of Champions	Brands Hatch	12 March	(United States) Dan Gurney	(United States) Eagle-Weslake	Report
(United Kingdom) I Spring Cup	Oulton Park	15 April	(Australia) Jack Brabham	(United Kingdom) Brabham-Repco	Report
(United Kingdom) XIX BRDC International Trophy	Silverstone	29 April	(United Kingdom) Mike Parkes	(Italy) Ferrari	Report
(Italy) XVI Gran Premio di Siracusa	Syracuse	21 May	(United Kingdom) Mike Parkes (Italy) Ludovico Scarfiotti	(Italy) Ferrari	Report
(United Kingdom) XIV International Gold Cup	Oulton Park	16 September	(Australia) Jack Brabham	(United Kingdom) Brabham-Repco	Report
(Spain) XV Spanish Grand Prix	Jarama	12 November	(United Kingdom) Jim Clark	(United Kingdom) Lotus-Ford	Report
