= Alan Rees (racing driver) =

British racing driver (1938–2024)

- Born: Alan Brinley Rees; 12 January 1938; Langstone, Newport, Monmouthshire, Wales
- Died: 6 September 2024 (aged 86); Ascot, Berkshire, England

Formula One World Championship career
- Nationality: (United Kingdom) British
- Active years: 1966–1967
- Team(s): Cooper, non-works Brabham
- Entries: 3
- Championships: 0
- Wins: 0
- Podiums: 0
- Career points: 0
- Pole positions: 0
- Fastest laps: 0
- First entry: 1966 German Grand Prix

Alan Brinley Rees (12 January 1938 – 6 September 2024) was a British racing driver. He participated in three World Championship Grands Prix in the 1960s, although two of those appearances were driving Formula 2 cars. He scored no championship points. His best result was seventh place (second in the Formula Two class) in the 1967 German Grand Prix.

Rees drove for the works Lotus Formula Junior team in 1962, and won three races before a crash at the Nürburgring 1000 km sports car race ended his season. From 1963 to 1968, he drove for the Roy Winklemann Racing team in Formula Two and frequently achieved victories over experienced drivers such as Jackie Stewart and Jochen Rindt.

== Background ==
Rees was born in Langstone, Newport, Monmouthshire, Wales on 12 January 1938.

Rees died in Ascot, Berkshire on 6 September 2024 at the age of 86. His death was announced via Facebook by his son, racing driver and television presenter Paul Rees.

== Formula One team management ==
In 1969, Rees co-founded March Engineering; his initials being the "AR" in "March", alongside Max Mosley, Graham Coaker and Robin Herd. At the end of 1971 he moved to a Shadow Racing Cars where he became team principal. In 1977, he left Shadow to co-found Arrows. In 1996, he and the other remaining founders sold Arrows to Tom Walkinshaw. Following the death of Max Mosley in 2021, he became the sole surviving March co-founder.

== Complete Formula One World Championship results ==
(key)

| Year | Entrant | Chassis | Engine | 1 | 2 | 3 | 4 | 5 | 6 | 7 | 8 | 9 | 10 | 11 | WDC | Points |
|---|---|---|---|---|---|---|---|---|---|---|---|---|---|---|---|---|
| 1966 | Roy Winkelmann Racing | Brabham BT18 (F2) | Cosworth Straight-4 1.0L | MON | BEL | FRA | GBR | NED | GER; Ret | ITA | USA | MEX | | | NC | 0 |
| 1967 | Cooper Car Company | Cooper T81 | Maserati V12 | RSA | MON | NED | BEL | FRA | GBR; 9 | | | | | | NC | 0 |
| 1967 | Roy Winkelmann Racing | Brabham BT23 (F2) | Cosworth Straight-4 1.6L | | | | | | | GER; 7 | CAN | ITA | USA | MEX | NC | 0 |
