= 1967 Spring Cup =

1967 Daily Express Spring Cup
- Non-championship race in the 1967 Formula One season

Race details
- Date: 15 April 1967
- Official name: I Daily Express Spring Cup
- Location: Oulton Park
- Course: Permanent racing facility
- Course length: 4.442 km (2.76 miles)
- Distance: 2 x 10 (heats) & 1 x 30 (final) laps, 2 x 44.4 & 1 x 133.3 km (2 x 27.6 & 1 x 82.8 miles)

Pole position
Driver	(United Kingdom) Jackie Stewart	BRM
- Time: 1:32.2

Fastest lap
Driver	(Australia) Jack Brabham	Brabham-Repco
- Time: 1:32.4 (heat 1)

Podium
First	(Australia) Jack Brabham	Brabham-Repco
Second	(New Zealand) Denny Hulme	Brabham-Repco
Third	(United Kingdom) John Surtees	Honda

The 1st Daily Express Spring Cup was a non-Championship motor race, run to Formula One rules, held on 15 April 1967 at Oulton Park circuit in Cheshire, UK. The race was run over two heats of 10 laps of the circuit, then a final of 30 laps, and was won overall by Jack Brabham in a Brabham-Repco BT20.

The race was organised by the Mid-Cheshire Motor Racing Club in order to raise funds for the Grand Prix Medical Unit, inaugurated by BRM chairman Louis Stanley as an indirect result of Jackie Stewart's accident at the 1966 Belgian Grand Prix. All prize money, start money and gate money were donated to the fund.

The grid positions for the first heat were decided by a qualifying session, and the grid for the second heat was determined by the finishing order of the first heat. Similarly, the finishing order for the second heat decided the grid order for the final.

Jackie Stewart qualified his BRM in pole position for the first heat. Brabham driver Denny Hulme won both heats and Jack Brabham won the final, with Brabham and Hulme sharing fastest lap in the final. Brabham took fastest lap in the first heat, and Hulme shared fastest lap with BRM's Mike Spence in the second heat.

== Results ==
=== Heat 1 ===
Pos	No.	Driver	Entrant	Constructor	Time/Retired	Grid
1	2	(New Zealand) Denny Hulme	Brabham Racing Organisation	Brabham-Repco	15:44.4	2
2	7	(United Kingdom) John Surtees	Honda R & D Co.	Honda	+ 13.4 s	3
3	4	(United Kingdom) Mike Spence	BRM	BRM	+ 18.8 s	5
4	11	(United Kingdom) Graham Hill	Team Lotus	Lotus-Cosworth	+ 18.8 s	8
5	14	(New Zealand) Bruce McLaren	Bruce McLaren Motor Racing Ltd	McLaren-BRM	+ 26.0 s	6
6	12	(United Kingdom) Jackie Oliver	Team Lotus	Lotus-Cosworth	+ 30.4 s	9
7	5	(United Kingdom) Piers Courage	Reg Parnell (Racing)	Lotus-BRM	+ 50.2 s	10
8 (Ret)	1	(Australia) Jack Brabham	Brabham Racing Organisation	Brabham-Repco	7 laps, ignition fault	4
9	3	(United Kingdom) Jackie Stewart	BRM	BRM	6 laps	1
DNF	6	(United Kingdom) Bob Anderson	DW Racing Enterprises	Brabham-Climax	3 laps, broken exhaust	7

=== Heat 2 ===
Pos	No.	Driver	Entrant	Constructor	Time/Retired	Grid
1	2	(New Zealand) Denny Hulme	Brabham Racing Organisation	Brabham-Repco	15:57.2	1
2	7	(United Kingdom) John Surtees	Honda R & D Co.	Honda	+ 4.8 s	2
3	1	(Australia) Jack Brabham	Brabham Racing Organisation	Brabham-Repco	+ 23.6 s	8
4	3	(United Kingdom) Jackie Stewart	BRM	BRM	+ 23.8 s	9
5	14	(New Zealand) Bruce McLaren	Bruce McLaren Motor Racing Ltd	McLaren-BRM	+ 28.2 s	5
6	4	(United Kingdom) Mike Spence	BRM	BRM	+ 32.4 s	3
7	12	(United Kingdom) Jackie Oliver	Team Lotus	Lotus-Cosworth	+ 33.4 s	6
8	5	(United Kingdom) Piers Courage	Reg Parnell (Racing)	Lotus-BRM	9 laps	7
9	6	(United Kingdom) Bob Anderson	DW Racing Enterprises	Brabham-Climax	8 laps	10
DNF	11	(United Kingdom) Graham Hill	Team Lotus	Lotus-Cosworth	4 laps, oil leak	4

=== Final ===
Pos	No.	Driver	Entrant	Constructor	Time/Retired	Grid
1	1	(Australia) Jack Brabham	Brabham Racing Organisation	Brabham-Repco	47:21.4	3
2	2	(New Zealand) Denny Hulme	Brabham Racing Organisation	Brabham-Repco	+ 0.4 s	1
3	7	(United Kingdom) John Surtees	Honda R & D Co.	Honda	30 laps	2
4	12	(United Kingdom) Jackie Oliver	Team Lotus	Lotus-Cosworth	30 laps	7
5	14	(New Zealand) Bruce McLaren	Bruce McLaren Motor Racing Ltd	McLaren-BRM	29 laps	5
6	4	(United Kingdom) Mike Spence	BRM	BRM	29 laps	6
7	6	(United Kingdom) Bob Anderson	DW Racing Enterprises	Brabham-Climax	29 laps	9
8	11	(United Kingdom) Graham Hill	Team Lotus	Lotus-Cosworth	29 laps	10
DNF	3	(United Kingdom) Jackie Stewart	BRM	BRM	12 laps, accident	4
DNF	5	(United Kingdom) Piers Courage	Reg Parnell (Racing)	Lotus-BRM	9 laps, piston	8

Previous race: 1967 Race of Champions	Formula One non-championship races 1967 season	Next race: 1967 BRDC International Trophy
Previous race: None	Spring Cup	Next race: None
