= 1967 German Grand Prix =

Seventh round of the 1967 Formula One World Championship

Race details
- Date: 6 August 1967
- Official name: XXIX Großer Preis von Deutschland
- Location: Nürburgring; Nürburg, West Germany
- Course: Permanent racing facility
- Course length: 22.835 km (14.189 miles)
- Distance: 15 laps, 342.525 km (212.835 miles)
- Weather: Warm, dry and sunny

Pole position
Driver	(United Kingdom) Jim Clark	Lotus-Ford
- Time: 8:04.1

Fastest lap
Driver	(United States) Dan Gurney	Eagle-Weslake
- Time: 8:15.1 on lap 6

Podium
First	(New Zealand) Denny Hulme	Brabham-Repco
Second	(Australia) Jack Brabham	Brabham-Repco
Third	(New Zealand) Chris Amon	Ferrari

The 1967 German Grand Prix was a motor race for both Formula One (F1) and Formula Two (F2) cars held at the Nürburgring on 6 August 1967. It was race 7 of 11 in both the 1967 World Championship of Drivers and the 1967 International Cup for Formula One Manufacturers as well a non-Championship race of the 1967 European Formula Two Championship. The 15-lap race was won by Brabham driver Denny Hulme after he started from second position. His teammate Jack Brabham finished second and Ferrari driver Chris Amon came in third.

There had been some changes to the track in an attempt to slow the cars down as they approached the pit area. However, it was clear that the cars had developed considerably over 12 months, so the changes had very little effect on the lap times.

== Report ==
=== Entry ===
A total of 16 F1 cars were entered for the event, down from 21 in the preceding British GP. As in earlier years, and in the 1966 event, there was also a field of F2 cars with 1600cc engines, 10 this time. Amongst the F2 drivers were a number of future stars, including Jacky Ickx and Jo Schlesser in their Matras. Among the field were two wooden-chassis Protos. Apart from the F2 entries, the F1 field was much as usual except for a second Lola-BMW for Hubert Hahne. A F2 chassis, but with a 2-litre 16 valve BMW engine as in the BMW 2000 TI touring car that Hahne was racing successfully, thus entered as a F1 car.

=== Qualifying ===
Jim Clark took pole position for Team Lotus, in their Cosworth DFV powered Lotus 49, averaging a speed of 105.598 mph around the 14.189 mile circuit. Clark was nearly 10 seconds faster than the next driver, Denny Hulme in the Brabham-Repco BT24. Third fastest was set by Ickx in his F2 Matra- 20 seconds faster than the next F2 car. As this was a Formula Two car, Ickx would have to start behind the main grid. Therefore, alongside Clark and Hulme on the four car front row was the BRM P115 of Jackie Stewart and Dan Gurney's Eagle-Weslake T1G. The second Eagle of McLaren headed up the second row, where he was joined by John Surtees in his Honda RA273 and Jack Brabham in his Brabham-Repco BT24.

=== Race ===
Clark converted his pole position into an early lead, while his Team Lotus team-mate Graham Hill was pushed from his grid position of 13th, onto some grass, restarting the back of the field, behind the F2 cars. Clark stayed ahead Hulme and Gurney for the first three laps of the race. On the fourth lap, Clark dramatically slowed, his suspension having buckled, and so ended his race. Hill managed his Lotus up to tenth before mechanical troubles eventually put him out of the race.

Immediately, Gurney passed Hulme for the lead, while Brabham was third after McLaren retired with a split oil pipe. Ickx continued to impress. He was now up to fifth, behind Stewart. The Scotsman overtook Brabham, only to encounter transmission problems, and so Ickx moved up to fourth. Shortly after this, the Ferrari of Chris Amon closed up and passed the F2 Matra. By lap 12, Ickx was also out of the race, following the collapse of this front suspension. On the next lap, the universal joint on a driveshaft broke for the race leader, Gurney. Hulme took the lead to win from his team-mate Brabham and fellow Kiwi, Amon. This was the first Championship race since 1962 French Grand Prix without a driver from the United Kingdom on the podium.

== Classification ==
=== Qualifying ===
Pos	No	Driver	Constructor	Qualifying times			Gap
Pos	No	Driver	Constructor	P1	P2	P3	Gap
1	3	(United Kingdom) Jim Clark	Lotus-Ford	8:43.4	8:19.8	8:04.1	—
2	2	(New Zealand) Denny Hulme	Brabham-Repco	8:25.4	8:13.5	N/A*	+9.4s
3	29	(Belgium) Jacky Ickx	Matra-Cosworth	8:27.5	8:14.0	N/A*	+9.9s
4	11	(United Kingdom) Jackie Stewart	BRM	8:35.4^{T}	8:16.7^{T}	8:15.2	+11.1s
5	9	(United States) Dan Gurney	Eagle-Weslake	8:49.7	8:17.7	N/A*	+13.6s
6	10	(New Zealand) Bruce McLaren	Eagle-Weslake	—	8:36.7	8:17.7	+13.6s
7	7	(United Kingdom) John Surtees	Honda	8:25.0	8:18.2	N/A*	+14.1s
8	1	(Australia) Jack Brabham	Brabham-Repco	9:03.4	8:18.9	N/A*	+14.8s
9	8	(New Zealand) Chris Amon	Ferrari	8:44.7	8:20.4	N/A*	+16.3s
10	5	(Austria) Jochen Rindt	Cooper-Maserati	9:06.1	8:20.9	N/A*	+16.8s
11	6	(Mexico) Pedro Rodríguez	Cooper-Maserati	8:44.3	8:22.2	N/A*	+18.1s
12	12	(United Kingdom) Mike Spence	BRM	8:57.0^{T}	8:39.3^{T}	8:26.5	+22.4s
13	14	(Switzerland) Jo Siffert	Cooper-Maserati	10:53.1	8:31.8	8:31.4	+27.3s
14	4	(United Kingdom) Graham Hill	Lotus-Ford	—	8:31.7^{T}	N/A*	+27.6s
15	17	(West Germany) Hubert Hahne	Lola-BMW	8:52.3	8:44.2	8:32.8	+28.7s
16	24	(United Kingdom) Jackie Oliver	Lotus-Cosworth	8:54.1	8:40.9	8:34.9	+33.8s
17	22	(United Kingdom) Alan Rees	Brabham-Cosworth	9:10.6	8:41.9	8:39.8	+35.7s
18	23	(France) Jo Schlesser	Matra-Cosworth	8:49.2	8:40.6	N/A*	+36.5s
19	18	(United Kingdom) Chris Irwin	BRM	9:25.5	8:58.1	8:41.6	+37.5s
20	27	(United Kingdom) David Hobbs	Lola-BMW	8:56.4	8:46.2	N/A*	+42.1s
21	16	(Sweden) Jo Bonnier	Cooper-Maserati	8:53.5	8:47.8	N/A*	+43.7s
22	26	(West Germany) Kurt Ahrens Jr.	Protos-Cosworth	8:58.6	8:47.8	N/A*	+48.5s
23	20	(West Germany) Gerhard Mitter	Brabham-Cosworth	—	9:44.0	8:52.6	+48.5s
24	25	(United Kingdom) Brian Hart	Protos-Cosworth	9:05.3	8:59.7	N/A*	+55.6s
25	15	(France) Guy Ligier	Brabham-Repco	10:56.8	N/A*	9:14.4	+1:10.3
26	28	(United Kingdom) Brian Redman	Lola-Cosworth	9:59.7	—	—	+1:55.6
WD	21	(Australia) Frank Gardner	Brabham-Cosworth	Withdrawn			

- A pink background indicates a Formula Two entry.
- Drivers with an asterisk (*) failed to record an officially registered time as it was not an improvement on their previous best.
- ^{T} Indicates that a driver used a test/spare to set the best time in that session.

=== Race ===
Pos	No	Driver	Constructor	Laps	Time/Retired	Grid	Points
1	2	(New Zealand) Denny Hulme	Brabham-Repco	15	2:05:55.7	2	9
2	1	(Australia) Jack Brabham	Brabham-Repco	15	+ 38.5	7	6
3	8	(New Zealand) Chris Amon	Ferrari	15	+ 39.0	8	4
4	7	(United Kingdom) John Surtees	Honda	15	+ 2:25.7	6	3
5	24	(United Kingdom) Jackie Oliver	Lotus-Ford	15	+ 5:30.7	19	
6	16	(Sweden) Jo Bonnier	Cooper-Maserati	15	+ 8:42.1	16	2
7	22	(United Kingdom) Alan Rees	Brabham-Ford	15	+ 8:47.9	20	
8	15	(France) Guy Ligier	Brabham-Repco	14	+ 1 Lap	17	1
9	18	(United Kingdom) Chris Irwin	BRM	13	+ 2 Laps	15	
10	27	(United Kingdom) David Hobbs	Lola-BMW	13	+ 2 Laps	22	
11	6	(Mexico) Pedro Rodríguez	Cooper-Maserati	13	+ 2 Laps	10	
Ret	9	(United States) Dan Gurney	Eagle-Weslake	12	Halfshaft	4	
Ret	29	(Belgium) Jacky Ickx	Matra-Ford	12	Suspension	18	
NC	25	(United Kingdom) Brian Hart	Protos-Ford	12	+3 Laps	25	
Ret	14	(Switzerland) Jo Siffert	Cooper-Maserati	12	Fuel pump	12	
Ret	4	(United Kingdom) Graham Hill	Lotus-Ford	8	Suspension	13	
Ret	17	(West Germany) Hubert Hahne	Lola-BMW	6	Suspension	14	
Ret	11	(United Kingdom) Jackie Stewart	BRM	5	Differential	3	
Ret	3	(United Kingdom) Jim Clark	Lotus-Ford	4	Suspension	1	
Ret	5	(Austria) Jochen Rindt	Cooper-Maserati	4	Radiator	9	
Ret	26	(West Germany) Kurt Ahrens Jr.	Protos-Ford	4	Radiator	23	
Ret	10	(New Zealand) Bruce McLaren	Eagle-Weslake	3	Oil leak	5	
Ret	12	(United Kingdom) Mike Spence	BRM	3	Differential	11	
Ret	23	(France) Jo Schlesser	Matra-Ford	2	Engine	21	
Ret	20	(West Germany) Gerhard Mitter	Brabham-Ford	0	Engine	24	
DNS	28	(United Kingdom) Brian Redman	Lola-Ford		Car driven by Hobbs		

Note: The race was run with both Formula One and Formula Two cars running together. Formula Two entrants are denoted by a pink background.

== Notes ==
- This was the Formula One World Championship debut for British drivers Jackie Oliver, Brian Hart and Brian Redman.
- This was the Formula One World Championship debut for British constructor Protos.

== Championship standings after the race ==
Drivers' Championship standings

	Pos	Driver	Points
	1	(New Zealand) Denny Hulme	37
1	2	(Australia) Jack Brabham	25
1	3	(United Kingdom) Jim Clark	19
	4	(New Zealand) Chris Amon	19
	5	(Mexico) Pedro Rodríguez	14

Constructors' Championship standings

	Pos	Constructor	Points
	1	(United Kingdom) Brabham-Repco	42
1	2	(United Kingdom) Cooper-Maserati	21
1	3	(United Kingdom) Lotus-Ford	19
	4	(Italy) Ferrari	19
	5	(United Kingdom) BRM	11

- Notes: Only the top five positions are included for both sets of standings.

Previous race: 1967 British Grand Prix	FIA Formula One World Championship; 1967 season	Next race: 1967 Canadian Grand Prix
Previous race: 1966 German Grand Prix	German Grand Prix	Next race: 1968 German Grand Prix
