= Protos (constructor) =

Wingless Formula 2 racing car

Protos as a Formula One chassis constructor
- Base: United Kingdom
- Founder(s): Frank Costin

Formula One World Championship career
- Engines: Cosworth
- Entrants: Ron Harris Racing Team
- First entry: 1967 German Grand Prix
- Last entry: 1967 German Grand Prix
- Races entered: 1
- Race victories: 0
- Constructors' Championships: 0
- Drivers' Championships: 0
- Points: 0
- Pole positions: 0
- Fastest laps: 0

The Protos was a wingless Formula 2 racing car that appeared in 1967. Powered by the then-standard Ford-Cosworth 1600cc FVA-engine, it was noticeable for its slippery aerodynamic Frank Costin design, with an almost-enclosed 'bubble' canopy over the cockpit and a chassis partially made of the very light but fragile plywood. Although fairly quick on fast tracks, it did not become a front runner and did not score wins during the European F2 season. Drivers included Brian Hart and Pedro Rodríguez.
