= 1967 British Grand Prix =

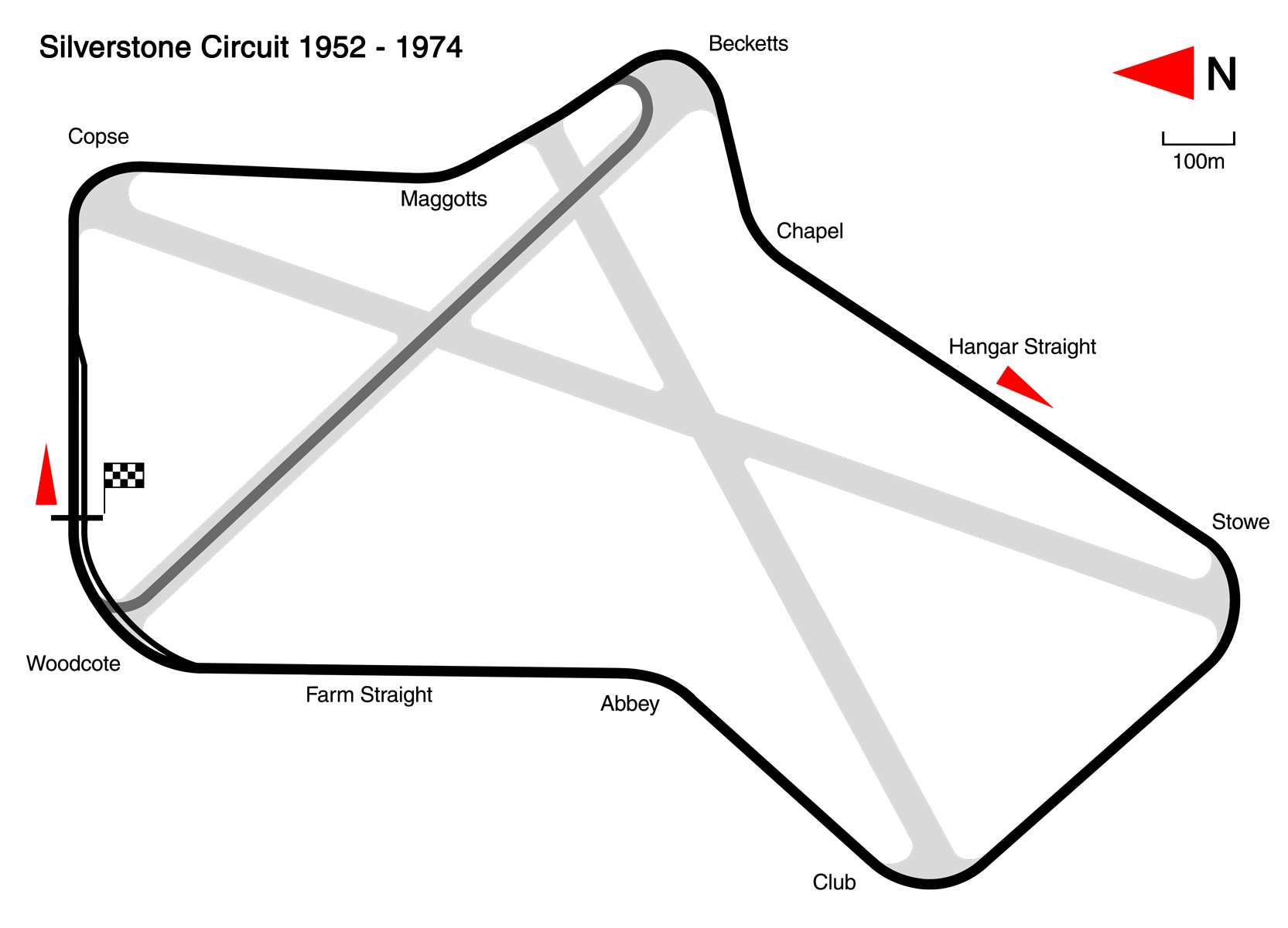

Race details
- Date: 15 July 1967
- Official name: XX RAC British Grand Prix
- Location: Silverstone Circuit; Silverstone, England
- Course: Permanent racing facility
- Course length: 4.711 km (2.927 miles)
- Distance: 80 laps, 376.880 km (234.160 miles)

Pole position
Driver	(United Kingdom) Jim Clark	Lotus-Ford
- Time: 1:25.3

Fastest lap
Driver	(New Zealand) Denny Hulme	Brabham-Repco
- Time: 1:27.0

Podium
First	(United Kingdom) Jim Clark	Lotus-Ford
Second	(New Zealand) Denny Hulme	Brabham-Repco
Third	(New Zealand) Chris Amon	Ferrari

The 1967 British Grand Prix was a Formula One motor race held at Silverstone on 15 July 1967. It was race 6 of 11 in both the 1967 World Championship of Drivers and the 1967 International Cup for Formula One Manufacturers. The 80-lap race was won by Lotus driver Jim Clark after he started from pole position. Denny Hulme finished second for the Brabham team and Ferrari driver Chris Amon came in third.

== Classification ==
=== Qualifying ===
Pos	No	Driver	Constructor	Time	Gap
1	5	(United Kingdom) Jim Clark	Lotus-Ford	1:25.3	—
2	6	(United Kingdom) Graham Hill	Lotus-Ford	1:26.0	+0.7
3	1	(Australia) Jack Brabham	Brabham-Repco	1:26.2	+0.9
4	2	(New Zealand) Denny Hulme	Brabham-Repco	1:26.3	+1.0
5	9	(United States) Dan Gurney	Eagle-Weslake	1:26.4	+1.1
6	8	(New Zealand) Chris Amon	Ferrari	1:26.9	+1.6
7	7	(United Kingdom) John Surtees	Honda	1:27.2	+1.9
8	11	(Austria) Jochen Rindt	Cooper-Maserati	1:27.4	+2.1
9	12	(Mexico) Pedro Rodríguez	Cooper-Maserati	1:27.9	+2.6
10	10	(New Zealand) Bruce McLaren	Eagle-Weslake	1:28.1	+2.8
11	4	(United Kingdom) Mike Spence	BRM	1:28.3	+3.0
12	3	(United Kingdom) Jackie Stewart	BRM	1:28.7	+3.4
13	15	(United Kingdom) Chris Irwin	BRM	1:29.6	+4.3
14	20	(United Kingdom) David Hobbs	BRM	1:30.1	+4.8
15	14	(United Kingdom) Alan Rees	Cooper-Maserati	1:30.3	+5.0
16	16	(United Kingdom) Piers Courage	BRM	1:30.4	+5.1
17	19	(United Kingdom) Bob Anderson	Brabham-Climax	1:30.7	+5.4
18	17	(Switzerland) Jo Siffert	Cooper-Maserati	1:31.0	+5.7
19	23	(Sweden) Jo Bonnier	Cooper-Maserati	1:32.0	+6.7
20	22	(Switzerland) Silvio Moser	Cooper-ATS	1:32.9	+7.6
21	18	(France) Guy Ligier	Brabham-Repco	1:34.8	+9.5

=== Race ===
Pos	No	Driver	Constructor	Laps	Time/Retired	Grid	Points
1	5	(United Kingdom) Jim Clark	Lotus-Ford	80	1:59:25.6	1	9
2	2	(New Zealand) Denny Hulme	Brabham-Repco	80	+ 12.8	4	6
3	8	(New Zealand) Chris Amon	Ferrari	80	+ 16.6	6	4
4	1	(Australia) Jack Brabham	Brabham-Repco	80	+ 21.8	3	3
5	12	(Mexico) Pedro Rodríguez	Cooper-Maserati	79	+ 1 Lap	9	2
6	7	(United Kingdom) John Surtees	Honda	78	+ 2 Laps	7	1
7	15	(United Kingdom) Chris Irwin	BRM	77	+ 3 Laps	13	
8	20	(United Kingdom) David Hobbs	BRM	77	+ 3 Laps	14	
9	14	(United Kingdom) Alan Rees	Cooper-Maserati	76	+ 4 Laps	15	
10	18	(France) Guy Ligier	Brabham-Repco	76	+ 4 Laps	21	
Ret	19	(United Kingdom) Bob Anderson	Brabham-Climax	67	Engine	17	
Ret	6	(United Kingdom) Graham Hill	Lotus-Ford	64	Engine	2	
Ret	4	(United Kingdom) Mike Spence	BRM	44	Ignition	11	
Ret	9	(United States) Dan Gurney	Eagle-Weslake	34	Clutch	5	
Ret	22	(Switzerland) Silvio Moser	Cooper-ATS	29	Oil Pressure	20	
Ret	11	(Austria) Jochen Rindt	Cooper-Maserati	26	Engine	8	
Ret	3	(United Kingdom) Jackie Stewart	BRM	20	Transmission	12	
Ret	10	(New Zealand) Bruce McLaren	Eagle-Weslake	14	Engine	10	
Ret	17	(Switzerland) Jo Siffert	Cooper-Maserati	10	Engine	18	
Ret	23	(Sweden) Jo Bonnier	Cooper-Maserati	0	Engine	19	
DNS	16	(United Kingdom) Piers Courage	BRM	0	Driven by Irwin	16	

== Notes ==
- This was the Formula One World Championship debut for British driver David Hobbs.

== Championship standings after the race ==
Drivers' Championship standings

	Pos	Driver	Points
	1	(New Zealand) Denny Hulme	28
3	2	(United Kingdom) Jim Clark	19
1	3	(Australia) Jack Brabham	19
	4	(New Zealand) Chris Amon	15
2	5	(Mexico) Pedro Rodríguez	14

Constructors' Championship standings

	Pos	Constructor	Points
	1	(United Kingdom) Brabham-Repco	33
3	2	(United Kingdom) Lotus-Ford	19
1	3	(United Kingdom) Cooper-Maserati	19
	4	(Italy) Ferrari	15
2	5	(United Kingdom) BRM	11

- Notes: Only the top five positions are included for both sets of standings.

Previous race: 1967 French Grand Prix	FIA Formula One World Championship; 1967 season	Next race: 1967 German Grand Prix
Previous race: 1966 British Grand Prix	British Grand Prix	Next race: 1968 British Grand Prix
