= 1967 French Grand Prix =

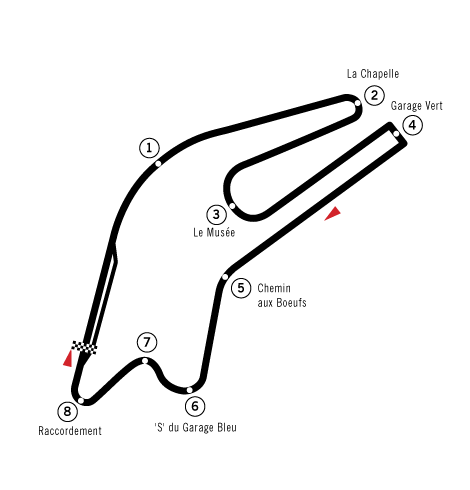

Race details
- Date: 2 July 1967
- Official name: 53e Grand Prix de l'ACF
- Location: Bugatti Circuit, Le Mans, France
- Course: Permanent race track
- Course length: 4.430 km (2.753 miles)
- Distance: 80 laps, 354.40 km (220.24 miles)

Pole position
Driver	(United Kingdom) Graham Hill	Lotus-Ford
- Time: 1:36.2

Fastest lap
Driver	(United Kingdom) Graham Hill	Lotus-Ford
- Time: 1:36.7 on lap 7

Podium
First	(Australia) Jack Brabham	Brabham-Repco
Second	(New Zealand) Denny Hulme	Brabham-Repco
Third	(United Kingdom) Jackie Stewart	BRM

The 1967 French Grand Prix was a Formula One motor race held at the Bugatti Circuit, Le Mans on 2 July 1967. It was race 5 of 11 in both the 1967 World Championship of Drivers and the 1967 International Cup for Formula One Manufacturers. The race was the first French Grand Prix to be held in Le Mans since the race in 1929, and as of 2025 is the only time the Bugatti Circuit has been used for the Grand Prix, though the circuit continues to host the French motorcycle Grand Prix.

The new Bugatti circuit opened in 1965 and used the main pit straight at Le Mans, which back in 1967 did not have the Dunlop Chicane. After the start and the Dunlop Curve, instead of the left turn at the Esses at the bottom of the hill, the Bugatti Circuit instead turned right at "La Chapelle" into an infield section comprising the third gear "Le Musée" left hander and the second gear "Garage Vert" corner which led onto the back straight, whose only distinctive feature was the "Chemin Aux Boeufs" left hand kink (now a left-right chicane) some two-thirds along, before heading back to the pit straight via the "S Bleu" and "Raccordement" corners near the entrance to the pits.

The Bugatti circuit was seen as somewhat boring and was universally unpopular with both drivers and crowds, with only a reported 20,000 attending the race. Some of the drivers were reported to have privately wished the race was run on the full 13.461 km (8.364 mi) long Circuit de la Sarthe, where the 5.7 km (3.5 mi) Mulsanne Straight was actually 1.3 km (0.81 mi) longer than the entire Bugatti circuit. At the time, circuit lengths of 10 km (6.2 mi) or longer were common in Grand Prix racing, including the 14.120 km (8.774 mi) Spa-Francorchamps used for the Belgian Grand Prix and the 22.835 km (14.189 mi) Nürburgring used for the German Grand Prix, so many drivers felt that using the full 24 Hours circuit should have been considered as the venue by the Automobile Club de France.

== Race report ==
Graham Hill was on pole and led away for the first lap until Jack Brabham took over. On lap 7 Jim Clark took the lead and Hill passed Brabham to make it a Lotus 1–2. Hill then retook the lead until his crown-wheel and pinion failed on lap 14. The same problem caused Clark's retirement from the lead on lap 23, leaving Brabham ahead of Dan Gurney, Chris Amon and Denny Hulme. On lap 41 a fuel line broke on Gurney's car, making it a Brabham 1-2 and Amon's throttle cable broke several laps later. Brabham drove home serenely to win his first race in eight Grands Prix by 49.5 seconds from teammate Hulme, and over a lap in front of the BRM of Jackie Stewart.

== Classification ==
=== Qualifying ===
Pos	No	Driver	Constructor	Time	Gap
1	7	(United Kingdom) Graham Hill	Lotus-Ford	1:36.2	—
2	3	(Australia) Jack Brabham	Brabham-Repco	1:36.3	+0.1
3	9	(United States) Dan Gurney	Eagle-Weslake	1:37.0	+0.8
4	6	(United Kingdom) Jim Clark	Lotus-Ford	1:37.5	+1.3
5	8	(New Zealand) Bruce McLaren	Eagle-Weslake	1:37.6	+1.4
6	4	(New Zealand) Denny Hulme	Brabham-Repco	1:37.9	+1.7
7	2	(New Zealand) Chris Amon	Ferrari	1:38.0	+1.8
8	12	(Austria) Jochen Rindt	Cooper-Maserati	1:38.9	+2.7
9	15	(United Kingdom) Chris Irwin	BRM	1:39.4	+3.2
10	10	(United Kingdom) Jackie Stewart	BRM	1:39.6	+3.4
11	18	(Switzerland) Jo Siffert	Cooper-Maserati	1:40.1	+3.9
12	11	(United Kingdom) Mike Spence	BRM	1:40.3	+4.1
13	14	(Mexico) Pedro Rodríguez	Cooper-Maserati	1:40.5	+4.3
14	17	(United Kingdom) Bob Anderson	Brabham-Climax	1:44.9	+8.7
15	16	(France) Guy Ligier	Cooper-Maserati	1:45.2	+9.0

=== Race ===
Pos	No	Driver	Constructor	Laps	Time/Retired	Grid	Points
1	3	(Australia) Jack Brabham	Brabham-Repco	80	2:13:21.3	2	9
2	4	(New Zealand) Denny Hulme	Brabham-Repco	80	+ 49.5	6	6
3	10	(United Kingdom) Jackie Stewart	BRM	79	+ 1 Lap	10	4
4	18	(Switzerland) Jo Siffert	Cooper-Maserati	77	+ 3 Laps	11	3
5	15	(United Kingdom) Chris Irwin	BRM	76	Engine	9	2
6	14	(Mexico) Pedro Rodríguez	Cooper-Maserati	76	+ 4 Laps	13	1
NC	16	(France) Guy Ligier	Cooper-Maserati	68	+ 12 Laps	15	
Ret	2	(New Zealand) Chris Amon	Ferrari	47	Throttle	7	
Ret	9	(United States) Dan Gurney	Eagle-Weslake	40	Fuel Leak	3	
Ret	12	(Austria) Jochen Rindt	Cooper-Maserati	33	Engine	8	
Ret	8	(New Zealand) Bruce McLaren	Eagle-Weslake	26	Ignition	5	
Ret	6	(United Kingdom) Jim Clark	Lotus-Ford	23	Differential	4	
Ret	17	(United Kingdom) Bob Anderson	Brabham-Climax	16	Ignition	14	
Ret	7	(United Kingdom) Graham Hill	Lotus-Ford	13	Differential	1	
Ret	11	(United Kingdom) Mike Spence	BRM	9	Halfshaft	12	
WD	1	(Italy) Ludovico Scarfiotti	Ferrari				
WD	5	(United Kingdom) John Surtees	Honda				
WD	19	(Sweden) Jo Bonnier	Cooper-Maserati				
WD	20	(France) Jean-Pierre Beltoise	Matra-Ford				
WD	21	(France) Johnny Servoz-Gavin	Matra-Ford				

== Championship standings after the race ==
Drivers' Championship standings

	Pos	Driver	Points
	1	(New Zealand) Denny Hulme	22
4	2	(Australia) Jack Brabham	16
1	3	(Mexico) Pedro Rodríguez	12
1	4	(New Zealand) Chris Amon	11
1	5	(United Kingdom) Jim Clark	10

Constructors' Championship standings

	Pos	Constructor	Points
	1	(United Kingdom) Brabham-Repco	27
	2	(United Kingdom) Cooper-Maserati	17
3	3	(United Kingdom) BRM	11
1	4	(Italy) Ferrari	11
1	5	(United Kingdom) Lotus-Ford	10

- Note: Only the top five positions are included for both sets of standings.

Previous race: 1967 Belgian Grand Prix	FIA Formula One World Championship; 1967 season	Next race: 1967 British Grand Prix
Previous race: 1966 French Grand Prix	French Grand Prix	Next race: 1968 French Grand Prix
