= Weslake =

Engine manufacturer

Weslake as a Formula One engine manufacturer
- Base: Rye, East Sussex, England
- Founder(s): Harry Weslake

Formula One World Championship career
- First entry: 1966 Italian Grand Prix
- Last entry: 1968 Italian Grand Prix
- Races entered: 18
- Chassis: Eagle
- Constructors' Championships: 0
- Drivers' Championships: 0
- Race victories: 1
- Podiums: 2
- Points: 13
- Pole positions: 0
- Fastest laps: 1

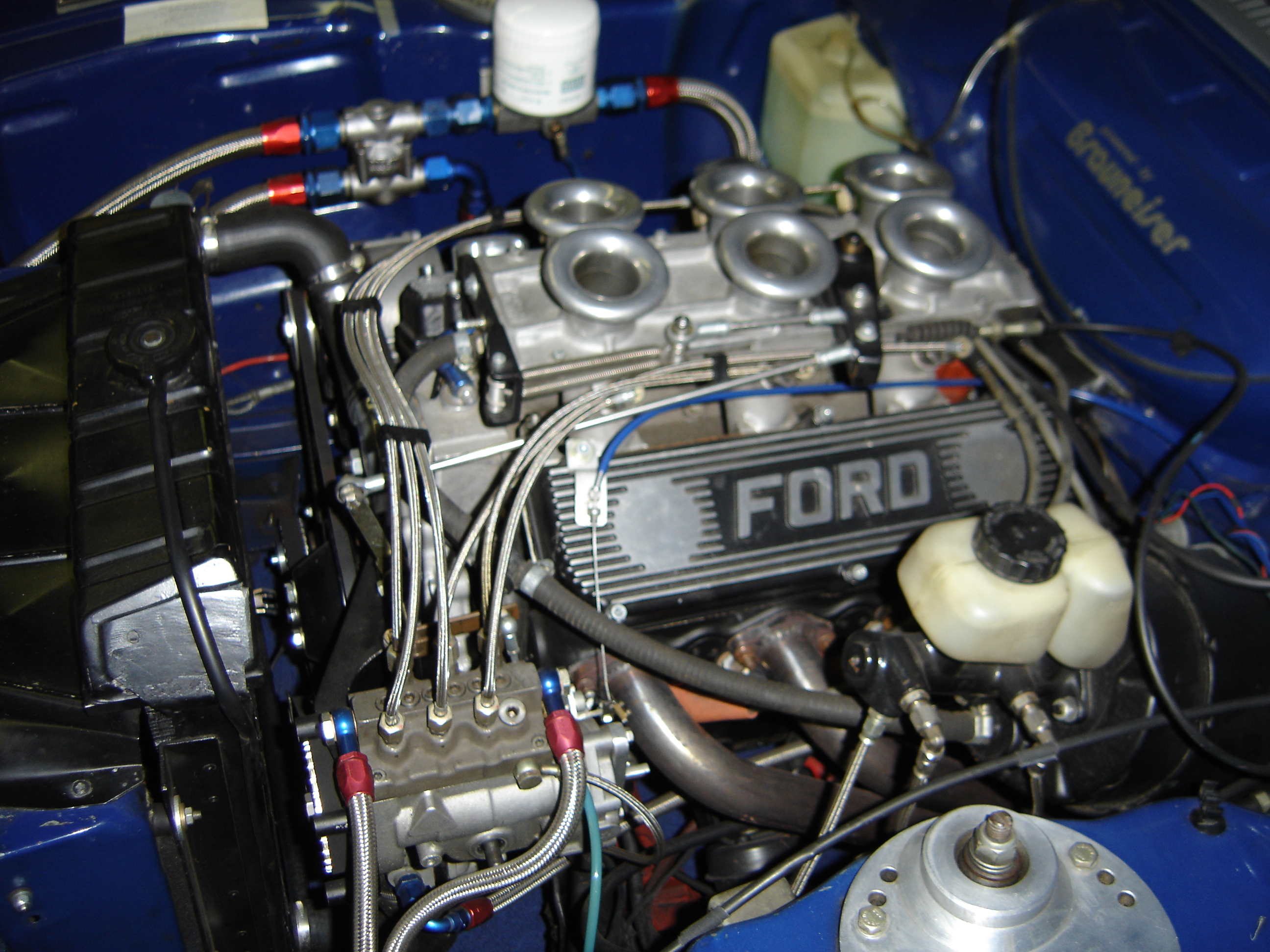
Race Engine of a 1971 Ford Capri RS from Weslake & Co with 320 HP (DIN) at 8.200 rpm with Kugelfischer Injection.

Weslake & Co, also known as Weslake Research and Development, was founded by Harry Weslake, described as England's greatest expert on cylinder head design, with premises in Rye, East Sussex, England. Weslake is most famous for its work with Bentley, Austin, Jaguar and the Gulf-Wyer Ford GT40 Mk.I.

== Early days ==
Harry Weslake was born in Exeter in 1897 to Henry John Weslake, a director of Willey and Co, gas engineers, whom he would join from school. At 16, he modified a Rudge Multi to race at local hill climbing events. In World War I, he joined the Royal Flying Corp, against the wishes of his employers Willey & Co, who wanted him to continue his apprenticeship. When he was demobbed in 1919, he had already received his first patent with his father in 1918 for a device to improve carburettors. However both his parents died shortly after, and with no link to Willey's, Weslake left and set up a workshop with 3 others in Exeter. The workshop marketed his Wex carburettor design, which was used in motorsport, with Weslake being a regular at Brooklands. It was after a discussion with J E Greenwood, chief engineer at Sunbeam Cycles competition team while at Brooklands, that Weslake developed an air flow meter to test gas flow in the combustion chamber. This work led to him working as a consultant to the Sunbeam team.

Due to his growing reputation, Weslake was invited to work with W. O. Bentley to tune his racing engines cylinder heads, which resulted in the first Le Mans win. It was the collapse of his company Wex Carburettors Ltd in 1926 that saw Weslake move to Automotive Engineering. In 1935, after a turbulent relationship with Automotive Engineering, he left to set up his own business based at the Alta racing car factory called Weslake & Taylor, consulting for companies such as Austin, MG, Citroën and Swallow Sidecars (later to become Jaguar). It was at Swallows where he had been instrumental in modifying the side valve Standard engine to overhead valve used in the first SS sports car. He also worked on the larger SS engine, which Motorsport Magazine described as

The 2½-litre car has an o.h.v. power-unit with Weslake combustion chambers, and gives over 40 b.h.p. per litre

=== World War II ===
Weslake was involved in the development of the Rolls-Royce Merlin engine for both aircraft and tank usage. During World War II, Weslake worked with William Heynes, Walter Hassan and Claude Baily, on the design of the Jaguar XK engine. In addition he worked as a consultant on the Jowett Javelin flat four engine, and for Karrier and Scammell trucks.

== Weslake Research and Development ==
In the 1940s, Weslake set up his research company in Rye, and was contracted by Norton to work on improving gas flow on their Manx engine. He also designed the cylinder head for the overhead valve version of the BMC A-series engine that was used in the Morris Minor, the Mini, the BMC ADO16, the Austin Allegro and the Morris Marina and received royalties on each of these engines manufactured. He was also used as a consultant on the BMC B-series engine & BMC C-Series engine. Weslake acted as consultant to Facel Vega for the development of its new 4 cylinder engine to be used in its new Facellia model. The Rover Company employed Weslake to develop a new head for its 3-litre engine, the final development which was used in the Rover P4 110 and the Rover P5. Weslake would also work as a consultant with Chrysler, developing a wedge head combustion chamber for their RB engine which was first fitted as Stage II in 1963. In 1953, Weslake were given a patent for a unique layout of having valves provide a weak and rich mix to enable high compression ratios to be used without pre-ignition or pinking of the charge taking place. This was a precursor to Honda's CVCC engine which appeared in February 1971, five months after the Weslake patent expired.

=== Start of F1 involvement ===
From the start of the Vanwall Motor racing team, Weslake worked as a consultant, initially developing a new head for the Ferrari engines used. During 1956, Weslake worked with Leo Kuzmicki, Colin Chapman and Frank Costin to develop a new Vanwall car, which Stirling Moss drove to a win in a non championship F1 race, and convinced him to join the team in 1957. The car would go onto win the first constructors championship title in 1958. Weslake would go on to work as a consultant for Coventry-Climax, by advising them on port design for their FPF engine that was used by Cooper and Lotus Formula One teams.

=== Gurney Weslake ===
In 1966 Dan Gurney commissioned Weslake Engineering to build an Aubrey Woods designed 3.0-litre V12 Formula One engine for his Eagle Mk1. The engine had initially been a design for BRM, but lost out to their own H16 design. Their efforts produced a V12 that was smooth and powerful. At Monza, an insight into the future of engine design was seen for the first time. The engine had four valves per cylinder at a narrow included angle (thirty degrees) that allowed a single cover to enclose both the close-spaced camshafts on each bank. The sixty-degree-vee layout had a larger bore than stroke (72.8 × 60 mm). Gurney won the 1967 Race of Champions at Brands Hatch, a non-championship event, and the 1967 Belgian Grand Prix with the Eagle-Weslake V12 engine.

At Monza in 1966, 364 bhp (271 kW) was available. This increased to 390 bhp (290 kW) during the winter. At the 1967 Brands Hatch Race of Champions, Dan Gurney's engine gave 413 bhp (308 kW) and Richie Ginther's engine gave 409 bhp (305 kW). On test, up to 422 bhp (315 kW) had been achieved. At Monaco, Gurney had 411 bhp (306 kW), Ginther 417 bhp (311 kW). Later in the 1967 season quotes of 416 bhp (310 kW) were made. (These are figures from Motoring News.) The engines peaked at around 10,000 rpm. A figure of 442 bhp (330 kW) was mentioned at the start of 1968, but after money ran out, a test made at the B.R.M. factory recorded only 378 bhp (this may have been a 'tired' engine). Harry Weslake had an eventual goal of 500 bhp (370 kW) @ 12,000 rpm. Later Ford sponsored (75.0 × 56.25 mm) versions in 1972 were quoted at 465 bhp (347 kW) @ 10,500 rpm.

Harry Weslake and his company provided the Gurney-Weslake cylinder heads for the engines that powered the Gulf-Wyer Ford GT40 Mk.I to two consecutive wins at Le Mans, in 1968 and 1969.

=== Ford Weslake V-12 ===
In 1970, Harry Weslake agreed to develop a V12 engine for Ford and JWA, the operator of the John Wyer sports car team. The engine was devised after a meeting between Weslake, Ford's motorsport director Stuart Turner and GT40 designer Len Bailey at the British Grand Prix, and Keith Duckworth's reluctance to let the Cosworth DFV be used in sports car racing. Weslake and his stepson, Michael Daniel designed a 3-litre V12 with cylinder dimensions of 75 x 56.5mm in an aluminium-alloy block, which was designed to allow a bore increase up to 80mm, and was unusually strong to withstand the rigours of 24-hour racing. A cast magnesium sump added to its stiffness and was cross-bolted to the caps of the five main bearings, which were downsized relative to previous Weslake designs to reduce weight and friction. The engine first run on the 20 December 1971, recording a peak power of 450bhp, compared with 451bhp for a DFV on the same rig. The initial design was signed-off for further development by Ford and JWA, however the relationship started to falter after Weslake's push to use the engine in F1, and poor tests in a modified Brabham BT39 and a Gulf-Mirage M6. Gordon Murray and Derek Bell said there was issues with the tests, and subsequent test at Silverstone showed the DFV and V12 powered Mirages were near identical. However, with Ford's racing budget being smashed after the 1973 Oil Crisis, Weslake took JWA to court to try and reclaim the development costs, which JWA settled out of court. The undeveloped engine, which was finally tested independently at 461 bhp, was sold to Terry Hoyle for £10,000 to keep Weslake afloat.

=== Ford tuning work ===
During the 1970s, Weslake manufactured the Cologne RS2600 engine that Ford fitted to the Capri via a subsidiary Weslake Capri. This also included the special Weslake aluminium heads used for Ford's touring car challenge. The Weslake Ford Capri went on to finish 10th and 11th at the 1972 24 hours of Le Mans, and the 1971 and 1972 driver titles in the European Touring Car Championship. Jeff Uren's Race Proved linked up with Weslake who provided the Ford Essex V6 tuned engines. The customers had various tuning choices; the standard Ford Capri-spec 3.0 L engine with 138 bhp and 182 ft-lbs of torque, the 170, 180, 190 and the mighty 218 bhp Tecalemit fuel-injected version, which in a 1972 Motorsport Magazine article about the Race Proved Cortina Savage was timed as fast to 0-60 mph as a Jaguar E-Type V12.

=== Motorcycle engines ===
Weslake Engineering went on to design a series of successful motorcycle engines during the 1970s were also used in early shifter karts. The Weslake parallel twin was used in Sidecar racing and was fitted to several motorcycle frames including Seeley.

Peter Collins of Belle Vue Aces and England won the 1976 Speedway World Final on a Weslake engined bike. Harry Weslake's last project was for Lord Hesketh, developing a 992cc air cooled vee-twin for the Hesketh V1000.

The Weslake eight-valve head for twins was sold to Nourish Racing Engines who continue to manufacture the design.

=== Aero engines ===
In the 1970s, Weslake Aeromarine was set up after a request for assistance from the UK Ministry of Defence. The company developed a variety of two stroke and four stroke engines:

- Weslake Type 060
- Weslake Type 116
- Weslake Type 200
- Weslake Type 274
- Weslake Type 342
- Weslake Type 430
- Weslake Type 548
- Weslake Type 860
- Weslake Type 1527

The company was purchased, along with the engine designs by Normalair-Garrett in 1979.

In 1980, Weslake & Co restarted Aero engine work developing the following engines:

- Weslake W50
- Weslake W40/50-73-02
- Weslake W42/55
- Weslake W65/75-118-02
- Weslake CF 122/E

The rights to the Aero engines were sold in 1984 to Emdair.

=== Powerboat engines ===
During the 1960s, Weslake were used as consultants to improve turbo-charged diesel engines for powerboat racing.

=== Later developments ===
Since Harry Weslake's death, the company worked on a variety of engines under Michael Daniels, Harry Weslake's stepson, including the Diesel Air Dair 100, Weslake A80 and the Excelsior-Henderson X-Twin. Bruce Penhall rode a Weslake speedway motorcycle to many successes in the early 1980s, including two World Individual Speedway Championships.

The company was split up, with Weslake Capri owned by Capri specialist Ric Wood Motorsport since 2012. The marine and aero engine business is owned by AVVRON Ltd

== Harry Weslake's Death ==
Harry Weslake died in 1978 while attending the World Speedway Championship at Wembley.

== Honours ==
Harry Weslake was awarded the Segrave Medal in 1976 for developing the four-stroke speedway engine that Peter Collins won his World Championship on.

The Goodwood Revival Festival has since 2017 named its trophy for Spridget racing The Weslake Cup, in honour of Harry Weslake, and his work on the A-series engine.

== See also ==
- Elva
- Harry Ricardo
- Frank Halford
