= 1967 Belgian Grand Prix =

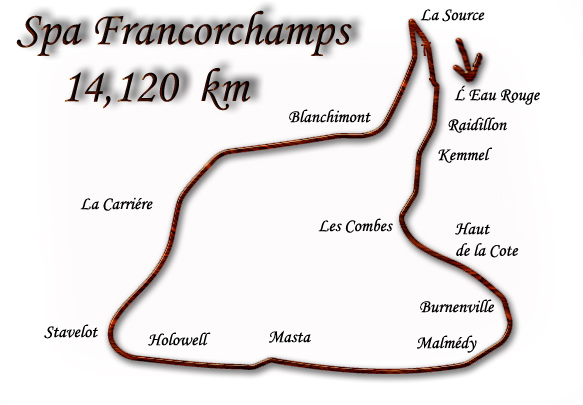

Race details
- Date: 18 June 1967
- Official name: XXVII Grand Prix de Belgique
- Location: Spa-Francorchamps, Francorchamps, Belgium
- Course: Permanent racing circuit
- Course length: 14.120 km (8.770 miles)
- Distance: 28 laps, 395.36 km (245.56 miles)

Pole position
Driver	(United Kingdom) Jim Clark	Lotus-Ford
- Time: 3:28.1

Fastest lap
Driver	(United States) Dan Gurney	Eagle-Weslake
- Time: 3:31.9

Podium
First	(United States) Dan Gurney	Eagle-Weslake
Second	(United Kingdom) Jackie Stewart	BRM
Third	(New Zealand) Chris Amon	Ferrari

The 1967 Belgian Grand Prix was a Formula One motor race held at Spa-Francorchamps on 18 June 1967. It was race 4 of 11 in both the 1967 World Championship of Drivers and the 1967 International Cup for Formula One Manufacturers. The 28-lap race was won by Eagle driver Dan Gurney after he started from second position. Jackie Stewart finished second for the BRM team and Ferrari driver Chris Amon came in third.

Excluding the Indianapolis 500, this is the only win for a USA-built car as well as one of only two wins of an American-licensed constructor in Formula One. It was also the first win for an American constructor in a Grand Prix race since the Jimmy Murphy's triumph with Duesenberg at the 1921 French Grand Prix.

== Race report ==
Jim Clark led off the grid from pole position and maintained that position for the first 11 laps and was 20 seconds ahead of Jackie Stewart and Dan Gurney when he had to come into the pits for a plug change, which cost him two minutes. Stewart built up a comfortable lead, helped even further when Gurney had to come into the pits with fuel pressure problems, losing another 20 seconds. However, it was now Stewart's time for mechanical problems as his gearshift was faltering. Gurney set a new lap record to catch and pass him 8 laps from the end and gain a maiden victory for the beautiful magnesium and titanium Eagle car. The light weight and advanced aerodynamics of the car made it very fast, and Gurney shattered Tony Brooks' record Grand Prix average of 143 mph (set some 8 years earlier) on his way to victory. The Eagle was timed at 196 mph on the back straight, an extraordinary speed for a car with an engine producing (at that time) something less than 400 h.p.

Mike Parkes had a horrendous crash on the first lap at the exit of Blanchimont after losing control (on oil spilled from Stewart's BRM); his Ferrari rolled a number of times and he was thrown out of the car. Doctors considered amputating his legs and he was in a coma for a week. He survived, but had broken both of his legs. Parkes never raced in Formula One again.

== Classification ==
=== Qualifying ===
Pos	No	Driver	Constructor	Time	Gap
1	21	(United Kingdom) Jim Clark	Lotus-Ford	3:28.1	—
2	36	(United States) Dan Gurney	Eagle-Weslake	3:31.2	+3.1
3	22	(United Kingdom) Graham Hill	Lotus-Ford	3:32.9	+4.8
4	29	(Austria) Jochen Rindt	Cooper-Maserati	3:34.3	+6.2
5	1	(New Zealand) Chris Amon	Ferrari	3:34.3	+6.2
6	14	(United Kingdom) Jackie Stewart	BRM	3:34.8	+6.7
7	25	(Australia) Jack Brabham	Brabham-Repco	3:35.0	+6.9
8	3	(United Kingdom) Mike Parkes	Ferrari	3:36.6	+8.5
9	2	(Italy) Ludovico Scarfiotti	Ferrari	3:37.7	+9.6
10	7	(United Kingdom) John Surtees	Honda	3:38.4	+10.3
11	12	(United Kingdom) Mike Spence	BRM	3:38.5	+10.4
12	39	(Sweden) Jo Bonnier	Cooper-Maserati	3:39.1	+11.0
13	30	(Mexico) Pedro Rodríguez	Cooper-Maserati	3:39.5	+11.4
14	26	(New Zealand) Denny Hulme	Brabham-Repco	3:40.3	+12.2
15	17	(United Kingdom) Chris Irwin	BRM	3:44.4	+16.3
16	34	(Switzerland) Jo Siffert	Cooper-Maserati	3:45.4	+17.3
17	19	(United Kingdom) Bob Anderson	Brabham-Climax	3:49.5	+21.4
18	32	(France) Guy Ligier	Cooper-Maserati	4:01.2	+33.1

=== Race ===
Pos	No	Driver	Constructor	Laps	Time/Retired	Grid	Points
1	36	(United States) Dan Gurney	Eagle-Weslake	28	1:40:49.4	2	9
2	14	(United Kingdom) Jackie Stewart	BRM	28	+ 1:03.0	6	6
3	1	(New Zealand) Chris Amon	Ferrari	28	+ 1:40.0	5	4
4	29	(Austria) Jochen Rindt	Cooper-Maserati	28	+ 2:13.9	4	3
5	12	(United Kingdom) Mike Spence	BRM	27	+ 1 lap	11	2
6	21	(United Kingdom) Jim Clark	Lotus-Ford	27	+ 1 lap	1	1
7	34	(Switzerland) Jo Siffert	Cooper-Maserati	27	+ 1 lap	16	
8	19	(United Kingdom) Bob Anderson	Brabham-Climax	26	+ 2 laps	17	
9	30	(Mexico) Pedro Rodríguez	Cooper-Maserati	25	Engine	13	
10	32	(France) Guy Ligier	Cooper-Maserati	25	+ 3 laps	18	
NC	2	(Italy) Ludovico Scarfiotti	Ferrari	24	+ 4 laps	9	
Ret	25	(Australia) Jack Brabham	Brabham-Repco	15	Engine	7	
Ret	26	(New Zealand) Denny Hulme	Brabham-Repco	14	Engine	14	
Ret	39	(Sweden) Jo Bonnier	Cooper-Maserati	10	Engine	12	
Ret	22	(United Kingdom) Graham Hill	Lotus-Ford	3	Clutch	3	
Ret	7	(United Kingdom) John Surtees	Honda	1	Engine	10	
Ret	17	(United Kingdom) Chris Irwin	BRM	1	Engine	15	
Ret	3	(United Kingdom) Mike Parkes	Ferrari	0	Accident	8	

== Notes ==
- This was Dan Gurney's fourth Formula One World Championship Grand Prix win and the third with a different team. Gurney became only the second driver to win a Grand Prix driving for his own team - after Jack Brabham. This was also the first win for his team Eagle, for an American constructor and for a Weslake-powered car. Gurney's win with Eagle was the third first win he achieved for the teams he drove for. At the 1962 French Grand Prix, Gurney had won Porsche's first and only Grand Prix win. At the 1964 French Grand Prix, he won Brabham's first Grand Prix win, only to win for the first time for Eagle now.

== Championship standings after the race ==
Drivers' Championship standings

	Pos	Driver	Points
	1	(New Zealand) Denny Hulme	16
	2	(Mexico) Pedro Rodríguez	11
2	3	(New Zealand) Chris Amon	11
1	4	(United Kingdom) Jim Clark	10
13	5	(United States) Dan Gurney	9

Constructors' Championship standings

	Pos	Constructor	Points
	1	(United Kingdom) Brabham-Repco	18
	2	(United Kingdom) Cooper-Maserati	14
1	3	(Italy) Ferrari	11
1	4	(United Kingdom) Lotus-Ford	10
6	5	(United States) Eagle-Weslake	9

- Notes: Only the top five positions are included for both sets of standings.

Previous race: 1967 Dutch Grand Prix	FIA Formula One World Championship; 1967 season	Next race: 1967 French Grand Prix
Previous race: 1966 Belgian Grand Prix	Belgian Grand Prix	Next race: 1968 Belgian Grand Prix
