= Andrew Vizard =

British engineer

- Education: Oxford Brookes University
- Occupation: Engineer
- Employer: Aston Martin F1 Team
- Title: Race engineer

Andrew Vizard is a British Formula One engineer. He is currently the race engineer to Fernando Alonso at the Aston Martin F1 Team.

== Career ==
Vizard studied mechanical engineering at Oxford Brookes University. He began his motorsports career at McLaren Automotive as a design mock up engineer, before moving to Formula One as a junior vehicle science at Manor Racing in 2016. After the team folded he moved to Williams Racing in 2017 as a Simulation and Analysis Engineer, supporting correlation work between simulator, vehicle models and track data. He was promoted to Performance Engineer in 2018, working with Lance Stroll during the Canadian's first season with the team. From 2019 to 2021 he partnered George Russell, contributing to car set-up development, performance analysis and race preparation his first seasons in the sport. In 2022 he worked with Alexander Albon, continuing in a performance-engineering capacity as the team returned to more competitive form.

In 2023 Vizard moved to the Aston Martin F1 Team as Senior Performance Engineer, reuniting with Stroll and helping guide the team through its most competitive season of the hybrid era. He was promoted to Race Engineer in 2024, taking over responsibility for Stroll's car, overseeing weekend execution, set-up direction and driver performance. For the 2025 season he became Race Engineer to Fernando Alonso, working alongside senior race engineer Chris Cronin and forming part of Aston Martin's senior trackside leadership group, with responsibility for car performance delivery, operational decision-making and engineering coordination across race weekends.
