= 1970 Belgian Grand Prix =

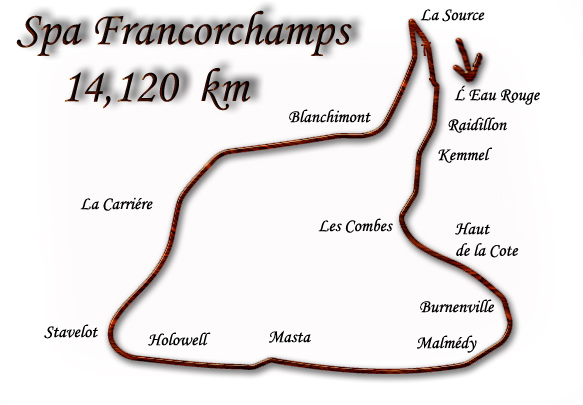

Race details
- Date: 7 June 1970
- Official name: XXIX Grand Prix de Belgique
- Location: Circuit de Spa-Francorchamps, Francorchamps, Spa, Belgium
- Course: Permanent racing facility
- Course length: 14.100 km (8.761 miles)
- Distance: 28 laps, 394.800 km (245.317 miles)

Pole position
Driver	(United Kingdom) Jackie Stewart	March-Ford
- Time: 3:28.0

Fastest lap
Driver	(New Zealand) Chris Amon	March-Ford
- Time: 3:27.4 on lap 27

Podium
First	(Mexico) Pedro Rodríguez	BRM
Second	(New Zealand) Chris Amon	March-Ford
Third	(France) Jean-Pierre Beltoise	Matra

The 1970 Belgian Grand Prix was a Formula One motor race held at Spa-Francorchamps on 7 June 1970. It was race 4 of 13 in both the 1970 World Championship of Drivers and the 1970 International Cup for Formula One Manufacturers.

March driver Chris Amon set the new lap record at this race, at a speed of 152 miles an hour. Race winner Pedro Rodríguez had set a 160 miles an hour lap in a sports car race the week before the Grand Prix. It was also Rodriguez's last victory in Formula One, and BRM's first victory since Jackie Stewart won the 1966 Monaco Grand Prix. This was the second Formula One win ever for a Mexican driver, and the last until the 2020 Sakhir Grand Prix. The race also saw the debut of Ignazio Giunti, who finished fourth in a Ferrari.

This was the last Formula One race to be held on the original Spa circuit. It was also the last Formula One victory for Dunlop.

== Qualifying ==
=== Qualifying classification ===
Pos.	Driver	Constructor	Time	Grid
1	(United Kingdom) Jackie Stewart	March-Ford	3:28.0	1
2	(Austria) Jochen Rindt	Lotus-Ford	3:30.1	2
3	(New Zealand) Chris Amon	March-Ford	3:30.3	3
4	(Belgium) Jacky Ickx	Ferrari	3:30.7	4
5	(Australia) Jack Brabham	Brabham-Ford	3:31.5	5
6	(Mexico) Pedro Rodríguez	BRM	3:31.6	6
7	(Germany) Rolf Stommelen	Brabham-Ford	3:32.0	7
8	(Italy) Ignazio Giunti	Ferrari	3:32.4	8
9	(Sweden) Ronnie Peterson	March-Ford	3:32.8	9
10	(Switzerland) Jo Siffert	March-Ford	3:32.9	10
11	(France) Jean-Pierre Beltoise	Matra	3:32.9	11
12	(United Kingdom) Piers Courage	De Tomaso-Ford	3:33.0	12
13	(United Kingdom) John Miles	Lotus-Ford	3:33.8	13
14	(United Kingdom) Jackie Oliver	BRM	3:34.2	14
15	(United Kingdom) Derek Bell	Brabham-Ford	3:36.2	15
16	(United Kingdom) Graham Hill	Lotus-Ford	3:37.0	16
17	(France) Henri Pescarolo	Matra	3:37.1	17
DNQ	(Spain) Alex Soler-Roig	Lotus-Ford	3:52.7	—

== Race ==
=== Classification ===
Pos	No	Driver	Constructor	Laps	Time/Retired	Grid	Points
1	1	(Mexico) Pedro Rodríguez	BRM	28	1:38:09.9	6	9
2	10	(New Zealand) Chris Amon	March-Ford	28	+ 1.1	3	6
3	25	(France) Jean-Pierre Beltoise	Matra	28	+ 1:43.7	11	4
4	28	(Italy) Ignazio Giunti	Ferrari	28	+ 2:38.5	8	3
5	19	(Germany) Rolf Stommelen	Brabham-Ford	28	+ 3:31.8	7	2
6	26	(France) Henri Pescarolo	Matra	27	Electrical	17	1
7	9	(Switzerland) Jo Siffert	March-Ford	26	Fuel pressure	10	
8	27	(Belgium) Jacky Ickx	Ferrari	26	+ 2 laps	4	
NC	14	(Sweden) Ronnie Peterson	March-Ford	20	+ 8 laps	9	
Ret	18	(Australia) Jack Brabham	Brabham-Ford	19	Clutch	5	
Ret	23	(United Kingdom) Graham Hill	Lotus-Ford	19	Engine	16	
Ret	11	(United Kingdom) Jackie Stewart	March-Ford	14	Engine	1	
Ret	21	(United Kingdom) John Miles	Lotus-Ford	13	Gearbox	13	
Ret	20	(Austria) Jochen Rindt	Lotus-Ford	10	Engine	2	
Ret	2	(United Kingdom) Jackie Oliver	BRM	7	Engine	14	
Ret	7	(United Kingdom) Piers Courage	De Tomaso-Ford	4	Oil pressure	12	
Ret	8	(United Kingdom) Derek Bell	Brabham-Ford	1	Gearbox	15	
DNS	22	(Spain) Alex Soler-Roig	Lotus-Ford		Completed insufficient laps in practice		

== Notes ==
- This was the Formula One World Championship debut for Italian driver Ignazio Giunti.
- This was the 100th Formula One World Championship Grand Prix for a Swedish driver. In those 100 races, Swedish drivers had won 1 Grand Prix, had achieved 1 podium finish and 1 pole position.
- This race marked the 5th podium finish for a Mexican driver.
- This was the first fastest lap set by a March.
- For the first time since the 1968 French Grand Prix, a Ford-powered car did not win the race. This ended a record streak of 20 consecutive Grand Prix wins by a Ford-powered car.

== Championship standings after the race ==
Drivers' Championship standings

	Pos	Driver	Points
	1	(Australia) Jack Brabham	15
	2	(United Kingdom) Jackie Stewart	13
9	3	(Mexico) Pedro Rodríguez	10
1	4	(Austria) Jochen Rindt	9
1	5	(New Zealand) Denny Hulme	9

Constructors' Championship standings

	Pos	Constructor	Points
3	1	(United Kingdom) March-Ford	19
1	2	(United Kingdom) Brabham-Ford	17
1	3	(United Kingdom) McLaren-Ford	15
1	4	(United Kingdom) Lotus-Ford	14
	5	(France) Matra	11

- Note: Only the top five positions are included for both sets of standings.

Previous race: 1970 Monaco Grand Prix	FIA Formula One World Championship; 1970 season	Next race: 1970 Dutch Grand Prix
Previous race: 1968 Belgian Grand Prix	Belgian Grand Prix	Next race: 1972 Belgian Grand Prix; Next race at Spa-Francorchamps: 1983 Belgian Grand Prix
