= 2020 Sakhir Grand Prix =

2020 Formula One race at Bahrain International Circuit

Race 16 of 17 (Note: The outbreak of the COVID-19 pandemic saw several Grands Prix cancelled or rescheduled. The revised calendar consisted of seventeen races.) in the 2020 Formula One World Championship
← Previous race	Next race →

Race details
- Date: 6 December 2020
- Official name: Formula 1 Rolex Sakhir Grand Prix 2020
- Location: Bahrain International Circuit, Sakhir, Bahrain
- Course: Permanent racing facility
- Course length: 3.543 km (2.202 miles)
- Distance: 87 laps, 307.995 km (191.379 miles)
- Weather: Clear
- Attendance: 0 (Note: The Grand Prix was held behind closed doors due to the COVID-19 pandemic in Bahrain.)

Pole position
Driver	(Finland) Valtteri Bottas	Mercedes
- Time: 0:53.377

Fastest lap
Driver	(United Kingdom) George Russell	Mercedes
- Time: 0:55.404 on lap 80 (lap record)

Podium
First	(Mexico) Sergio Pérez	Racing Point-BWT Mercedes
Second	(France) Esteban Ocon	Renault
Third	(Canada) Lance Stroll	Racing Point-BWT Mercedes

The 2020 Sakhir Grand Prix (officially known as the Formula 1 Rolex Sakhir Grand Prix 2020) was a Formula One motor race that took place on 6 December 2020 in Bahrain. The race was contested over 87 laps of the 'Outer Circuit' configuration of the Bahrain International Circuit in Sakhir, Bahrain. It was the first, and currently only, Formula One race on this track configuration. The race was the sixteenth and penultimate round in the 2020 Formula One World Championship and the second of two back-to-back races in Bahrain, with the Bahrain Grand Prix having taken place on the 'Grand Prix' configuration of the circuit one week beforehand. The race also marked the first, and thus far only, running of the Sakhir Grand Prix.

The race was won by Sergio Pérez of Racing Point, who took his first Formula One victory and Racing Point's only win as a constructor. Esteban Ocon finished second for the Renault team to claim his maiden podium in Formula One, while Pérez's teammate Lance Stroll finished third, giving Racing Point their only double podium finish as a constructor. Pérez became the first Mexican Formula One driver to win a race since Pedro Rodríguez won the 1970 Belgian Grand Prix. Racing Point became the first British constructor to win a race since Lotus F1 at the 2013 Australian Grand Prix. Recovering from a first-lap spin, Pérez won having inherited the lead on lap 64 of the race after longtime race leader George Russell fell foul of a pitstop error and a puncture.

This was the first race not to feature Lewis Hamilton, who tested positive for COVID-19 the week prior, since the start of his career in 2007, and the first not to feature Romain Grosjean, who had a serious accident in the previous race, since the 2012 Italian Grand Prix. As of 2026, it is the only Formula One Grand Prix appearance of Jack Aitken, and Lance Stroll's podium remains the most recent podium achieved by a Canadian driver.

== Background ==
=== Impact of the COVID-19 pandemic ===
Most of the races originally planned for the 2020 championship were postponed or cancelled because of the COVID-19 pandemic. The FIA drafted a new schedule in order to maximise the number of races on the calendar. In August 2020 the Sakhir Grand Prix was added to the schedule. It was held on 6 December 2020, one week after the Bahrain Grand Prix was held at the same venue. The Grand Prix was officially held behind closed doors, but authorities did give guest passes to local health workers and their families to attend in recognition of their efforts during the COVID-19 pandemic in Bahrain.

=== Circuit layout ===
This race used the 'Outer Circuit' layout, the first Formula One race to be held on this layout. At 3.543 km (2.202 mi) it was shorter than the 5.412 km (3.363 mi) 'Grand Prix' layout, which had been used for the Bahrain Grand Prix the week prior. The race was contested over 87 laps to exceed the 305 km (190 mi) race distance mandated by the regulations. Lap times in all sessions were under one minute. The only other World Championship Grand Prix weekend where sub-one minute lap times had been achieved was the 1974 French Grand Prix at Dijon-Prenois.

McLaren driver Lando Norris likened the layout's high speed nature to the Thruxton circuit in the United Kingdom, whilst regular Williams driver George Russell said he expected the layout to be "bonkers". Renault driver Daniel Ricciardo expressed his hope that the circuit would provide good overtaking opportunities, with Carlos Sainz Jr. of McLaren suggesting that choosing the correct setup, particularly downforce levels, would be difficult.

Some drivers declared themselves unhappy with the circuit layout after driving it in the Friday free practice sessions. Drivers such as Sainz Jr. and Max Verstappen feared potential safety issues during the first and second knockout sessions in qualifying, with the high probability of close proximity between cars on track due to the short lap distance and the potential huge discrepancies in closing speeds between cars, particularly in the early parts of qualifying, with Sainz saying the layout "was on the verge of being dangerous" and urging the FIA to take action. Verstappen also described the layout as "not the most exciting" while Ferrari's Sebastian Vettel called the layout "too short" and his Ferrari teammate Charles Leclerc said the circuit reminded him of his karting days. Despite driver concerns of the exceptionally short laptime creating traffic problems in qualifying, the FIA confirmed they would not relax the sport's rules on impeding during qualifying and that penalties would still be handed out to any driver found guilty of impeding a competitor.

=== Entrants ===
The drivers and teams were the same as the pre-season entry list with three exceptions: debutant Pietro Fittipaldi replaced Romain Grosjean for Haas, after the latter's crash at the previous week's Bahrain Grand Prix. World Champion Lewis Hamilton tested positive for the coronavirus the week before the race and, in accordance with Bahrain and FIA protocols, he was declared unfit to participate. This marked the first time that Hamilton did not take part in a Formula One race since his debut at the 2007 Australian Grand Prix. Williams driver and Mercedes protégé Russell replaced Hamilton. Jack Aitken, who had been competing in Formula 2, replaced Russell at Williams, making his Formula One race debut.

=== Tyres ===
Sole tyre supplier Pirelli brought their C2, C3, and C4 compound tyres (the middle range of hardnesses) for teams to use in dry conditions.

== Practice ==
The first of three practice sessions took place on Friday evening, with Russell at the top of the timesheet for Mercedes ahead of Red Bull Racing drivers Verstappen and Alex Albon. The second practice session took place on Friday night and Russell was again fastest, from Verstappen and Racing Point driver Sergio Pérez. The third practice session took place on Saturday, and Verstappen was fastest ahead of Valtteri Bottas and AlphaTauri driver Pierre Gasly.

== Qualifying ==
Valtteri Bottas qualified on pole position, despite not improving on his second run, with a time of 53.377 seconds to set a new record for the shortest pole position lap (in terms of time duration) in F1 history. This broke the record Niki Lauda set in qualifying for the 1974 French Grand Prix, which was 58.790 seconds. George Russell achieved second place in his debut qualifying session for Mercedes, just 0.026 seconds off Bottas' pole time.

=== Qualifying classification ===
Pos.	No.	Driver	Constructor	Qualifying times			Final grid
Pos.	No.	Driver	Constructor	Q1	Q2	Q3	Final grid
1	77	(Finland) Valtteri Bottas	Mercedes	0:53.904	0:53.803	0:53.377	1
2	63	(United Kingdom) George Russell	Mercedes	0:54.160	0:53.819	0:53.403	2
3	33	(Netherlands) Max Verstappen	Red Bull Racing-Honda	0:54.037	0:53.647	0:53.433	3
4	16	(Monaco) Charles Leclerc	Ferrari	0:54.249	0:53.825	0:53.613	4
5	11	(Mexico) Sergio Pérez	Racing Point-BWT Mercedes	0:54.236	0:53.787	0:53.790	5
6	26	(Russia) Daniil Kvyat	AlphaTauri-Honda	0:54.346	0:53.856	0:53.906	6
7	3	(Australia) Daniel Ricciardo	Renault	0:54.388	0:53.871	0:53.957	7
8	55	(Spain) Carlos Sainz Jr.	McLaren-Renault	0:54.450	0:53.818	0:54.010	8
9	10	(France) Pierre Gasly	AlphaTauri-Honda	0:54.207	0:53.941	0:54.154	9
10	18	(Canada) Lance Stroll	Racing Point-BWT Mercedes	0:54.595	0:53.840	0:54.200	10
11	31	(France) Esteban Ocon	Renault	0:54.309	0:53.995	N/A	11
12	23	(Thailand) Alexander Albon	Red Bull Racing-Honda	0:54.620	0:54.026	N/A	12
13	5	(Germany) Sebastian Vettel	Ferrari	0:54.301	0:54.175	N/A	13
14	99	(Italy) Antonio Giovinazzi	Alfa Romeo Racing-Ferrari	0:54.523	0:54.377	N/A	14
15	4	(United Kingdom) Lando Norris	McLaren-Renault	0:54.194	0:54.693	N/A	19^{1}
16	20	(Denmark) Kevin Magnussen	Haas-Ferrari	0:54.705	N/A	N/A	15
17	6	(Canada) Nicholas Latifi	Williams-Mercedes	0:54.796	N/A	N/A	16
18	89	(United Kingdom) Jack Aitken	Williams-Mercedes	0:54.892	N/A	N/A	17
19	7	(Finland) Kimi Räikkönen	Alfa Romeo Racing-Ferrari	0:54.963	N/A	N/A	18
20	51	(Brazil) Pietro Fittipaldi	Haas-Ferrari	0:55.426	N/A	N/A	20^{2}
107% time: 0:57.677

- ^1 – Lando Norris was required to start from the back of the grid for exceeding his quota of power unit elements.
- ^2 – Pietro Fittipaldi was required to start from the back of the grid for exceeding his quota of power unit elements. The penalty was unapplied as he qualified in last position anyway.

== Race ==
=== Race report ===
Russell made a quick getaway off the starting grid to take the lead of the Grand Prix at turn 1, with teammate Valtteri Bottas behind in second. A three-way fight for third began behind the two Mercedes, between Leclerc, Verstappen and Pérez. As the three navigated turn four, Leclerc braked late and hit Pérez, causing the Mexican to spin and damaging Leclerc's front left suspension. Verstappen slowed and took the turn wide, but could not turn in time to avoid the barrier on the outside of the turn. The incident triggered a safety car. Leclerc and Verstappen retired, but Pérez was able to rejoin and, after a tyre change, ran at the back of the field. After the race, Leclerc was penalised three grid spots for the Abu Dhabi Grand Prix for his part in the incident.

The safety car was withdrawn on lap 7 with Russell gradually widening his lead from Bottas. Behind them, Carlos Sainz Jr. and Lance Stroll, as well as AlphaTauri and Renault's drivers completed the top eight. Pérez made his way up into a points-paying tenth position by lap 20. By lap 50, all teams had made their first round of pit stops. The top three were Russell, Bottas, and McLaren's Carlos Sainz Jr. Pérez, having taken a second stop for fresh tyres, ran in ninth.

With the leaders on lap 54, Nicholas Latifi retired his Williams from 13th place, after turn 8 with an oil leak, triggering a virtual safety car (VSC). Several drivers behind the two leading Mercedes pitted for tyres. Sainz and Daniel Ricciardo were caught out by how brief the VSC was, and dropped down the order as they pitted under racing conditions. Pérez, who did not pit during this safety car period, made his way up to third, with Esteban Ocon's Renault in fourth and Lance Stroll in fifth.

On lap 61, Jack Aitken, racing for Williams in 15th place, spun and knocked off his front wing at the final turn, which came to rest on the track on the opening of the pit straight. The second virtual safety car of the race was called to allow marshals to remove the wing from the track. Mercedes elected to pit both its drivers on lap 63, at which time the virtual safety car was changed to a full safety car. Radio communication issues to Mercedes's tyre crews led to confusion over which tyre crew was to prepare first. Russell was sent out illegally with Bottas's front tyres, and Bottas remained in the pit box for nearly half a minute before being sent out with the same tyres he had come in on, after Mercedes realised the error. Russell was then forced to pit again on the next lap to fit a set of his own tyres. The Mercedes pit errors left Bottas in fourth and Russell in fifth, behind Pérez, Ocon, and Stroll in the top three positions.

When the safety car ended on lap 69, the top four drivers were under threat from Russell, who was the only driver among them on fresh tyres. Russell was able to pass Bottas, Stroll and Ocon, in that order, by lap 73, putting him in second position, chasing Pérez for the lead of the race. Bottas dropped to ninth on his worn hard tyres, passed by Russell, Sainz, Ricciardo, Albon and Daniil Kvyat on fresher mediums. On lap 78, Russell's car suffered a rear left tyre puncture, forcing him to pit yet again for a new set of tyres. Emerging in 14th position, Russell was able to fight back up to ninth on his new soft tyres in the closing laps to earn his first World Drivers' Championship points, and a point for the fastest lap of the race. Russell's fastest lap of 55.404 surpassed the record for shortest fastest race lap duration of 1:00.00 set by Jody Scheckter at the 1974 French Grand Prix. Pérez won the Grand Prix for Racing Point, the first victory of his 190-race career. He was followed by Ocon in second, while Stroll in the other Racing Point completed the podium. As of 2021, this is Racing Point's only win as a constructor and as a legal entity. Of the team's predecessors, Jordan Grand Prix last won a race at the 2003 Brazilian Grand Prix. Pérez was the first Mexican Formula One driver to win a race since Pedro Rodríguez at the 1970 Belgian Grand Prix. Ocon achieved his first Formula One podium. Racing Point's double-podium finish gave them 40 points and moved them back up into third in the Constructors' Championship, after it had lost that position to McLaren in the previous race. Regarding the lap 63 pit stop for Russell, the stewards concluded that only a monetary fine for Mercedes was necessary for the errors on Russell's car.

=== Post-race ===
Following the race Pérez said that he felt he could have held off Russell prior to the Briton being forced to pit for a puncture, declaring that "we won today on merit." Russell said that he felt he had the pace to win. Russell also impressed Mercedes with how he coped with the pressure of the weekend in general. Russell's regular team, Williams, admitted that they missed his input during the weekend. The win for Pérez meanwhile loudened the calls for him to be given a seat at Red Bull for 2021 in place of incumbent Albon. The poor performance of Bottas compared to Russell led to criticism both from the media and from Mercedes themselves. The pit stop mix-ups at Mercedes were put down to a radio failure. Renault driver Daniel Ricciardo was left frustrated after feeling his team gave rivals Racing Point the opportunity to win with strategic errors.

Following the Mercedes tyre mix-up, the FIA tweaked the tyre usage rules for 2021 so that driver/team would no longer face the risk of being disqualified for putting the incorrect tyres on the car.

=== Race classification ===
Pos.	No.	Driver	Constructor	Laps	Time/Retired	Grid	Points
1	11	(Mexico) Sergio Pérez	Racing Point-BWT Mercedes	87	1:31:15.114	5	25
2	31	(France) Esteban Ocon	Renault	87	+10.518	11	18
3	18	(Canada) Lance Stroll	Racing Point-BWT Mercedes	87	+11.869	10	15
4	55	(Spain) Carlos Sainz Jr.	McLaren-Renault	87	+12.580	8	12
5	3	(Australia) Daniel Ricciardo	Renault	87	+13.330	7	10
6	23	(Thailand) Alexander Albon	Red Bull Racing-Honda	87	+13.842	12	8
7	26	(Russia) Daniil Kvyat	AlphaTauri-Honda	87	+14.534	6	6
8	77	(Finland) Valtteri Bottas	Mercedes	87	+15.389	1	4
9	63	(United Kingdom) George Russell	Mercedes	87	+18.556	2	3^{1}
10	4	(United Kingdom) Lando Norris	McLaren-Renault	87	+19.541	19	1
11	10	(France) Pierre Gasly	AlphaTauri-Honda	87	+20.527	9	
12	5	(Germany) Sebastian Vettel	Ferrari	87	+22.611	13	
13	99	(Italy) Antonio Giovinazzi	Alfa Romeo Racing-Ferrari	87	+24.111	14	
14	7	(Finland) Kimi Räikkönen	Alfa Romeo Racing-Ferrari	87	+26.153	18	
15	20	(Denmark) Kevin Magnussen	Haas-Ferrari	87	+32.370	15	
16	89	(United Kingdom) Jack Aitken	Williams-Mercedes	87	+33.674	17	
17	51	(Brazil) Pietro Fittipaldi	Haas-Ferrari	87	+36.858	20	
Ret	6	(Canada) Nicholas Latifi	Williams-Mercedes	52	Oil leak	16	
Ret	33	(Netherlands) Max Verstappen	Red Bull Racing-Honda	0	Collision	3	
Ret	16	(Monaco) Charles Leclerc	Ferrari	0	Collision	4	
Fastest lap: (United Kingdom) George Russell (Mercedes) – 0:55.404 (lap 80)

Notes

- ^1 – Includes one point for fastest lap.

== Championship standings after the race ==
Drivers' Championship standings

	Pos.	Driver	Points
	1	(United Kingdom) **Lewis Hamilton**	332
	2	(Finland) Valtteri Bottas	205
	3	(Netherlands) Max Verstappen	189
1	4	(Mexico) Sergio Pérez	125
1	5	(Australia) Daniel Ricciardo	112

Constructors' Championship standings

	Pos.	Constructor	Points
	1	(Germany) **Mercedes**	540
	2	(Austria) Red Bull Racing-Honda	282
1	3	(United Kingdom) Racing Point-BWT Mercedes	194 (Note: Racing Point was deducted 15 points after a protest from Renault was upheld regarding the legality of their car.)
1	4	(United Kingdom) McLaren-Renault	184
	5	(France) Renault	172

- Note: Only the top five positions are included for both sets of standings.
- **Bold text** indicates the 2020 World Champions.

== See also ==
- 2020 2nd Sakhir Formula 2 round

== Notes ==
Previous race: 2020 Bahrain Grand Prix	FIA Formula One World Championship; 2020 season	Next race: 2020 Abu Dhabi Grand Prix
Previous race: N/A	Sakhir Grand Prix	Next race: N/A
