= Chris Cronin =

British engineer

- Occupation: Engineer
- Employer: Aston Martin F1 Team
- Title: Chief Engineer - Trackside

Chris Cronin is a British Formula One and motorsports engineer. He is currently the Chief Engineer - Trackside and senior race engineer to Fernando Alonso at the Aston Martin F1 Team.

== Career ==
Cronin joined Force India in 2015 as Performance Engineer to Nico Hülkenberg, focusing on car set-up, data analysis and performance optimisation. He later worked with Esteban Ocon during the 2017 and 2018 seasons, remained in the role through the team's administration and subsequent reformation as the Racing Point F1 Team. He helped engineer Lance Stroll in 2019. In 2020 he was promoted to Race Engineer for Pérez, overseeing race operations and car performance during the team's final season as Racing Point. Their partnership resulted in Perez's maiden victory at the 2020 Sakhir Grand Prix.

Following the team's transition to Aston Martin in 2021, Cronin became Race Engineer to Sebastian Vettel for the 2021 and 2022 seasons, contributing to the German's final Formula One podium in 2021. He then served as Race Engineer to Fernando Alonso in 2023 and 2024, playing a key role in a competitive 2023 campaign that delivered multiple podium finishes. For 2025, Cronin was appointed Chief Engineer – Race, assuming broader responsibility for coordinating trackside engineering activities and overall performance direction across both cars. In 2026 he additionally took on the role of Senior Race Engineer to Alonso, combining his oversight of the race team with direct driver-facing engineering duties for the Spaniard.
