= Jackie Oliver =

British racing driver and motorsport executive (born 1942)

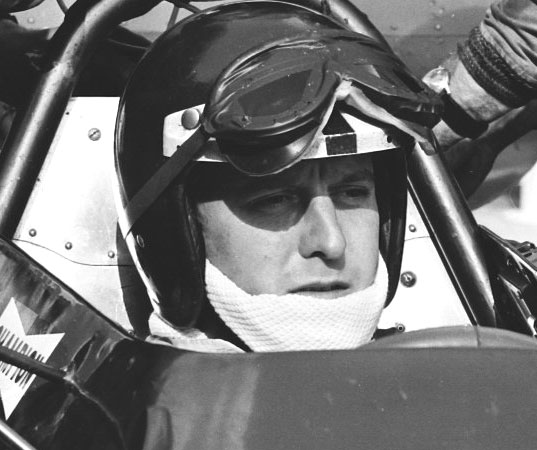
- Oliver at the 1969 German Grand Prix
- Born: Keith Jack Oliver; 14 August 1942 (age 84); Chadwell Heath, Essex, England

Formula One World Championship career
- Nationality: (United Kingdom) British
- Active years: 1967–1973, 1977
- Team(s): Lotus, BRM, McLaren, Shadow
- Entries: 52 (50 starts)
- Championships: 0
- Wins: 0
- Podiums: 2
- Career points: 13
- Pole positions: 0
- Fastest laps: 1
- First entry: 1967 German Grand Prix
- Last entry: 1977 Swedish Grand Prix

24 Hours of Le Mans career
- Years: 1968–1969, 1971
- Teams: Ford
- Best finish: 1st (1969)
- Class wins: 1 (1969)

Keith Jack Oliver (born 14 August 1942) is a British former racing driver and motorsport executive, who competed in Formula One between 1967 and 1977. (Note: The exact years Oliver competed in Formula One: 1967–1973, 1977.) In endurance racing, Oliver won the 24 Hours of Le Mans in 1969, the 12 Hours of Sebring in 1969, and the 24 Hours of Daytona in 1971, all with J.W. Automotive. From 1978 to 1996, he served as co-founder and team principal of Arrows in Formula One.

During his early career, Oliver achieved several class victories in the British Saloon Car Championship between 1966 and 1968. Oliver contested 52 Formula One Grands Prix for Lotus, BRM, McLaren, and Shadow, achieving two podiums at the Mexican Grand Prix in 1968 and the Canadian Grand Prix in 1973. He won the Canadian-American Challenge Cup in 1974. Oliver was also the second person to complete the informal Triple Crown of endurance racing.

== Driving career ==
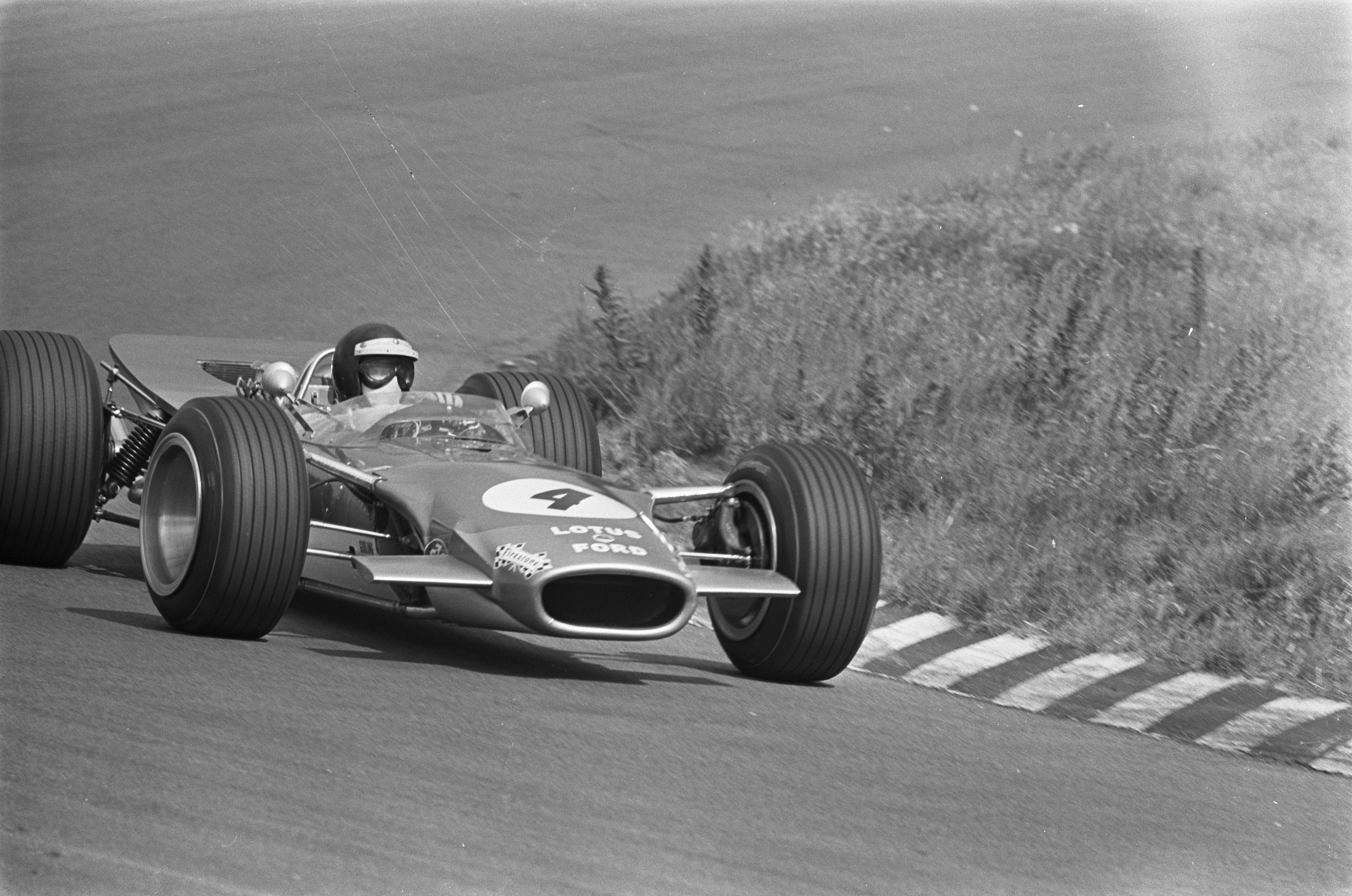
Oliver driving the Lotus 49 at the 1968 Dutch Grand Prix.

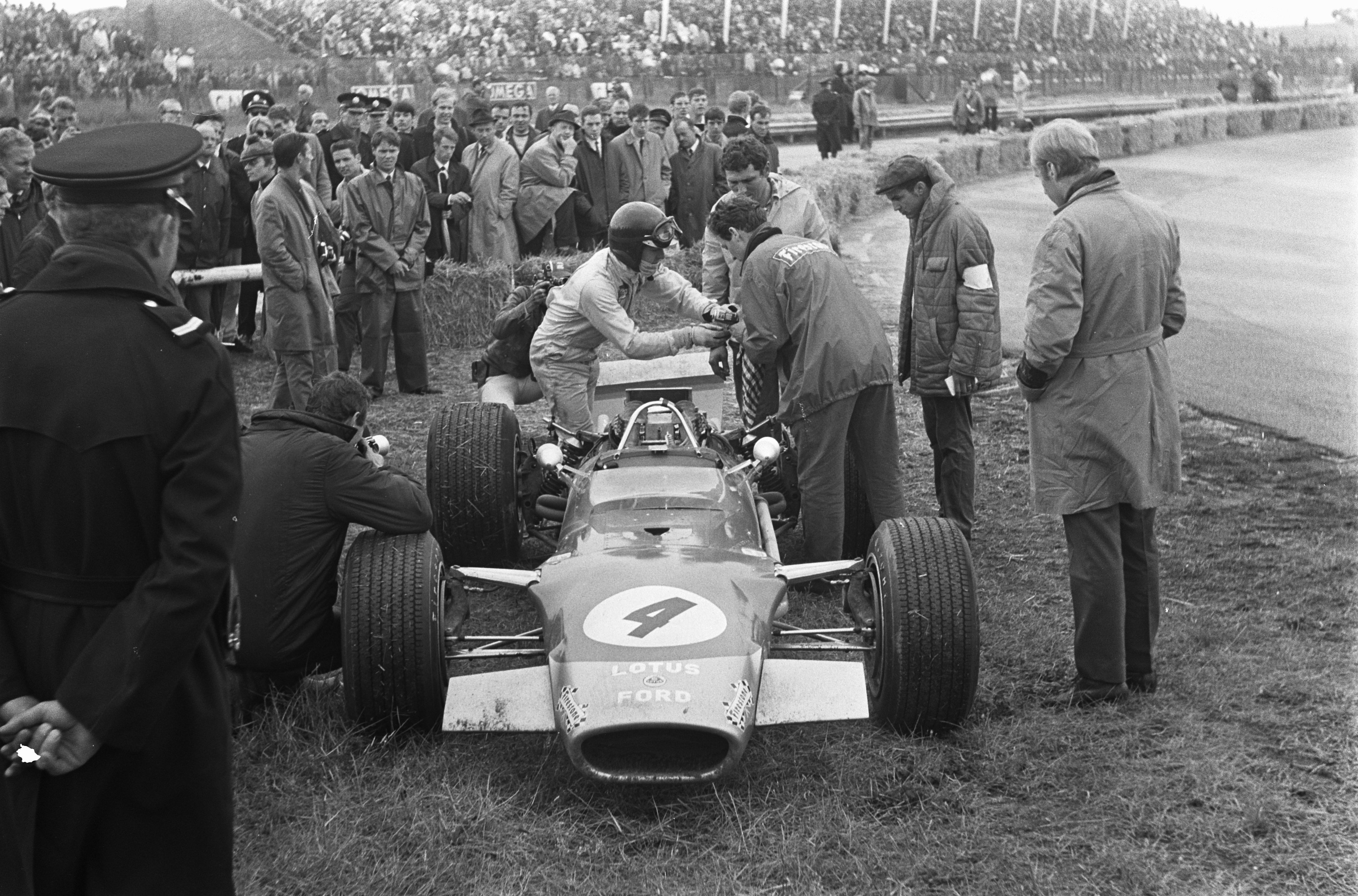
Oliver instructing officials to sort the Lotus 49 at the 1968 Dutch Grand Prix.

Oliver began a long career in motorsport in 1961, driving a Mini in British club saloon racing. In 1962 and 1963 he raced for Ecurie Freeze in a Marcos GT. In 1964 He raced in a Lotus Elan driving for D.R. Fabrications team and entered GT racing, scoring some excellent results, and then having a difficult time in Formula Three, where his natural speed was blighted by mechanical failures.

Nevertheless, for 1967, Oliver was drafted into the Team Lotus Formula Two team, which also saw him making his Grand Prix debut in the F2 class at the German Grand Prix, where he came fifth overall and won the F2 class. In 1968, he was called up to F1 by Colin Chapman to take over the works Formula One seat for Team Lotus after the death of Jim Clark. The season would turn out to be difficult, with Oliver struggling for finishes. He led the British Grand Prix until an engine failure, and would only finish twice, his best result being third place at the season-closing Mexican Grand Prix. In F2 he was reasonably successful driving a Lotus running for the Herts and Essex Aero Club team. At the end of the year the team was invited to compete in the four races making up the Argentine Temporada. The Herts and Essex Team finished third overall in the series.

With Jochen Rindt signing for Lotus for 1969, Oliver switched to BRM. He was to suffer disappointing two years at the Bourne team, which would effectively kill off his Grand Prix career. In two years, he would muster just four finishes, with his only points scores being sixth place in the 1969 Mexican Grand Prix, and fifth in the 1970 Austrian Grand Prix. However, in 1970, he led much of the Race of Champions holding off Stewart and was a strong third for most of the Dutch and British GP. The poor result in the Austrian GP which Team boss, Louis Stanley thought he should have won, saw the best car go to Pedro Rodríguez from then on, but Oliver still led some laps at the slipstream Italian race. Stanley described Oliver, as 'good, but not nearly as good as he thought'. The majority of his other races saw the BRM break down. Most pundits and sponsor, Yardley, were surprised and disappointed after Oliver was sacked by BRM. Jackie Stewart, judged Oliver a very good GP and Can-Am driver.

Oliver's best results in these seasons would come from endurance racing, in John Wyer's Gulf Ford GT40, winning the 12 Hours of Sebring and 24 Hours of Le Mans events with Jacky Ickx in 1969, and the 24 Hours of Daytona and the 1000 km Monza in 1971 with Rodríguez.

In 1969, Oliver debuted in CanAm, initially for Autocoast in the TI-22, and then for Don Nichols' Shadow team. 1971 saw him out of a full-time Formula One drive, though he had three drives in a third McLaren. 1972 saw him concentrate mainly on CanAm with Shadow, though he would take a one-off drive for BRM at the 1972 British Grand Prix, where he retired.

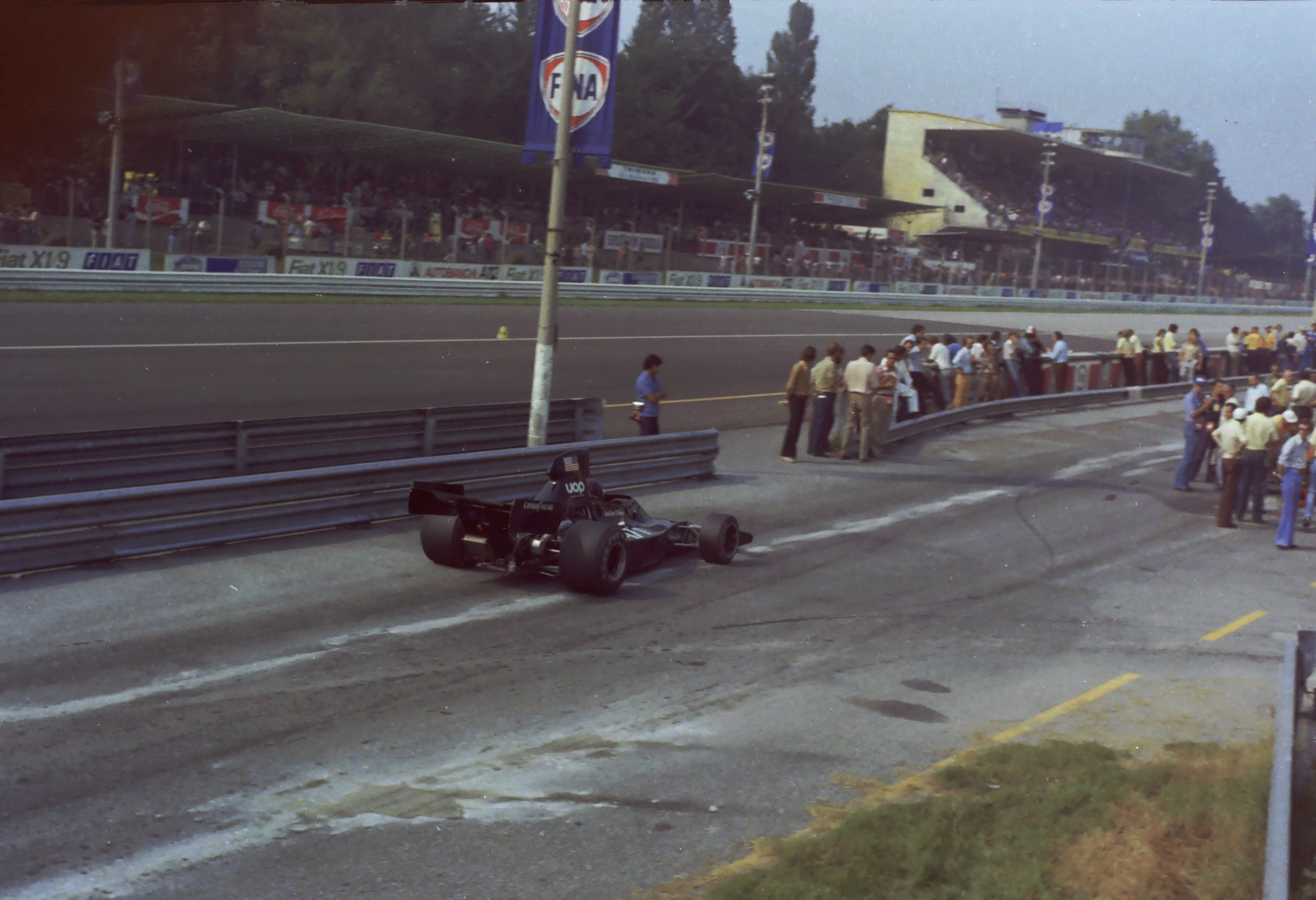
Jackie Oliver's Shadow-Ford DN1 enters Monza pit lane during 1973 Italian GP qualifying

For 1973, Shadow entered F1, and Oliver was nominated as team leader. The Shadow DN1 proved a difficult chassis, and once again his season was blighted by mechanical errors. However, in the Canadian Grand Prix he ran well, and many believe he actually won the race, but the lap charts were thrown into confusion by a rain shower meaning multiple pit-stops, and a staggeringly inept deployment of a pace car by the organisers. As it was, Oliver was classified third, his only points finish of the year.

1974 saw Oliver concentrate on CanAm, taking the series title for Shadow. He was becoming more involved in the management side of Shadow, but would compete in Formula 5000 for the team for three seasons, and even briefly returned to F1, finishing fifth in the 1977 Race of Champions, and taking 9th in the Swedish Grand Prix.

Oliver also competed in eight NASCAR Cup Series races between 1971 and 1972, the majority of them for Donlavey Racing. He attempted the 1972 Daytona 500 but failed to qualify.

== Arrows ==
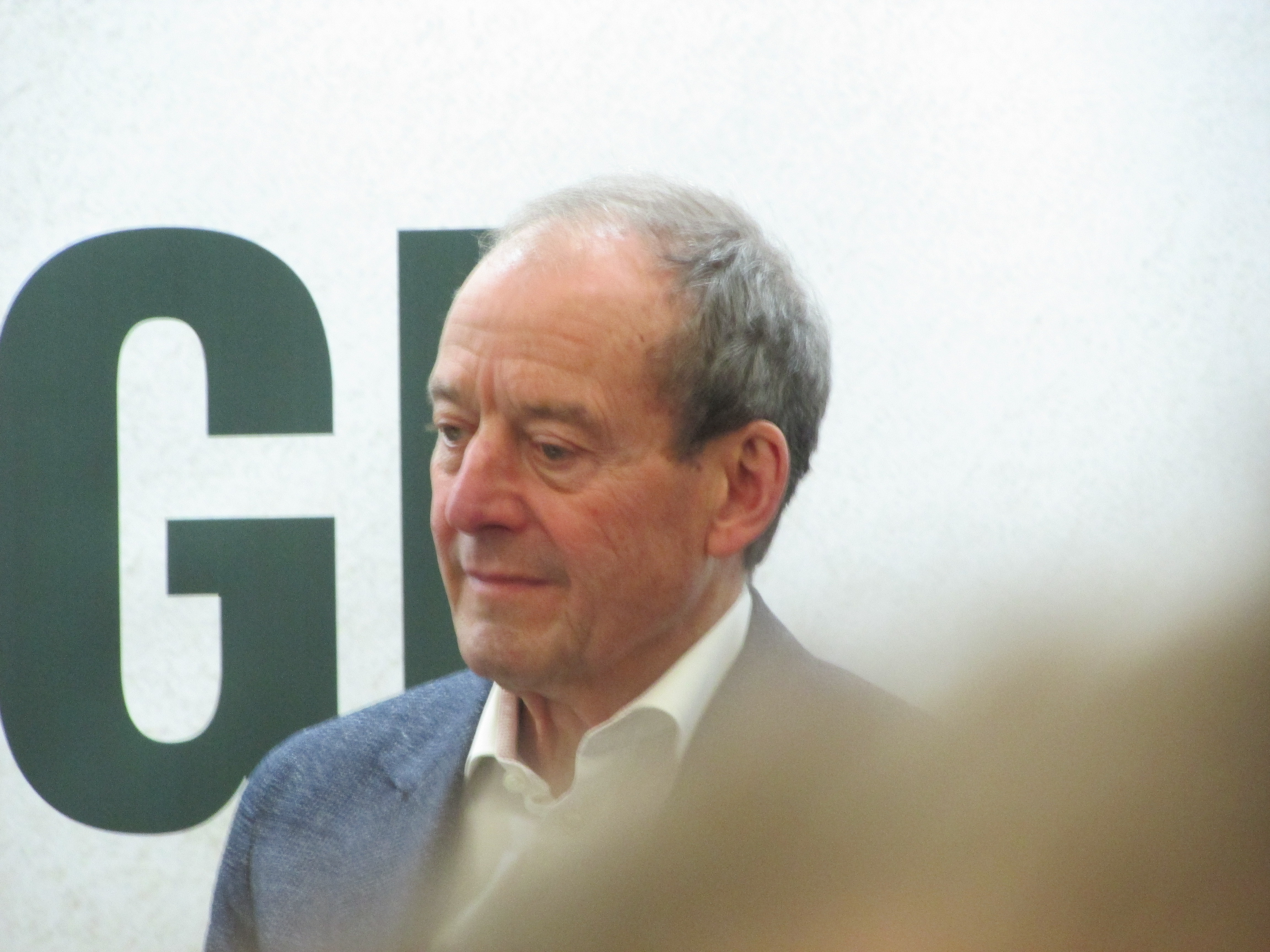
Oliver in 2023

At the end of 1977, Oliver left Shadow along with financer Franco Ambrosio, designers Tony Southgate and Alan Rees, engineer Dave Wass and driver Riccardo Patrese to form the Arrows Grand Prix team.

Arrows would become famous for competing in a record 382 Grands Prix without achieving a single victory.

Oliver sold much of his stake to the Japanese Footwork Corporation in 1990, remaining as director, but the team failed to move forward and the company pulled out at the end of 1993 due to financial trouble. Oliver had his team back, but money was tight, and in 1996, he again sold most of his shares to Tom Walkinshaw's TWR group. Oliver remained on the board until 1999, when he sold his remaining shares.

== Racing record ==
=== Complete British Saloon Car Championship results ===
(key) (Races in bold indicate pole position; races in italics indicate fastest lap.)

Year	Team	Car	Class	1	2	3	4	5	6	7	8	9	10	11	Pos.	Pts	Class
1966	DR Racing	Ford Mustang	D	SNE	GOO	SIL	CRY	BRH; 2	**BRH**; 2	OUL; Ret†	BRH; 1^				10th	22	**2nd**
1967	DR Racing	Ford Mustang	D	BRH; Ret^	**SNE**; 1	SIL; 1	SIL; NC	MAL; 2†	SIL; 2	SIL; 2	**BRH**; 1	OUL; 2†	BRH; 2		4th	54	**2nd**
1968	Alan Mann Racing	Ford Escort TC	D	BRH	THR	SIL	CRY	MAL	BRH	SIL	CRO; 3^	OUL	BRH; 2	BRH	22nd	10	5th

† Events with 2 races staged for the different classes.

^ Race with 2 heats - Aggregate result.

=== Complete Formula One World Championship results ===
(key) (Races in italics indicate fastest lap)

Year	Entrant	Chassis	Engine	1	2	3	4	5	6	7	8	9	10	11	12	13	14	15	16	17	WDC	Pts.
1967	Lotus Components Ltd.	Lotus 48 (F2)	Ford Cosworth FVA 1.6 L4	RSA	MON	NED	BEL	FRA	GBR	GER; 5*	CAN	ITA	USA	MEX							NC	0
1968	Gold Leaf Team Lotus	Lotus 49	Ford Cosworth DFV 3.0 V8	RSA	ESP	MON; Ret															15th	6
1968	Gold Leaf Team Lotus	Lotus 49B	Ford Cosworth DFV 3.0 V8				BEL; 5	NED; NC	FRA; DNS	GBR; Ret	GER; 11	ITA; Ret	CAN; Ret	USA; DNS	MEX; 3						15th	6
1969	Owen Racing Organisation	BRM P133	BRM P101 3.0 V12	RSA; 7																	17th	1
1969	Owen Racing Organisation	BRM P133	BRM P142 3.0 V12		ESP; Ret	MON; Ret	NED; Ret	FRA	GBR; Ret												17th	1
1969	Owen Racing Organisation	BRM P138	BRM P142 3.0 V12							GER; Ret											17th	1
1969	Owen Racing Organisation	BRM P139	BRM P142 3.0 V12								ITA; Ret	CAN; Ret	USA; Ret	MEX; 6							17th	1
1970	Owen Racing Organisation	BRM P153	BRM P142 3.0 V12	RSA; Ret																	20th	2
1970	Yardley Team BRM	BRM P153	BRM P142 3.0 V12		ESP; Ret	MON; Ret	BEL; Ret	NED; Ret	FRA; Ret	GBR; Ret	GER; Ret	AUT; 5	ITA; Ret	CAN; NC	USA; Ret	MEX; 7					20th	2
1971	Bruce McLaren Motor Racing	McLaren M14A	Ford Cosworth DFV 3.0 V8	RSA	ESP	MON	NED	FRA	GBR; Ret	GER		ITA; 7	CAN	USA							NC	0
1971	Bruce McLaren Motor Racing	McLaren M19A	Ford Cosworth DFV 3.0 V8								AUT; 9										NC	0
1972	Marlboro BRM	BRM P160B	BRM P142 3.0 V12	ARG	RSA	ESP	MON	BEL	FRA	GBR; Ret	GER	AUT	ITA	CAN	USA						NC	0
1973	UOP Shadow Racing Team	Shadow DN1	Ford Cosworth DFV 3.0 V8	ARG	BRA	RSA; Ret	ESP; Ret	BEL; Ret	MON; 10	SWE; Ret	FRA; Ret	GBR; Ret	NED; Ret	GER; 8	AUT; Ret	ITA; 11	CAN; 3	USA; 15			14th	4
1977	Shadow Racing Team	Shadow DN8	Ford Cosworth DFV 3.0 V8	ARG	BRA	RSA	USW	ESP	MON	BEL	SWE; 9	FRA	GBR	GER	AUT	NED	ITA	USA	CAN	JPN	NC	0

* First in the Formula Two (F2) class, Oliver was ineligible to score points in the 1967 German Grand Prix because he was driving a F2 car.

=== Complete Formula One Non-Championship results ===
(key) (Races in italics indicate fastest lap)

Year	Entrant	Chassis	Engine	1	2	3	4	5	6	7	8
1967	Lotus Components Ltd.	Lotus 41B (F2)	Ford Cosworth FVA 1.6 L4	ROC	SPR; 4	INT	SYR	OUL; Ret	ESP		
1968	Gold Leaf Team Lotus	Lotus 49B	Ford Cosworth DFV 3.0 V8	ROC	INT	OUL; 3					
1969	Owen Racing Organisation	BRM P133	BRM P101 3.0 V12	ROC; 5	INT	MAD					
1969	Sports Cars Switzerland	Lola T142 (F5000)	Chevrolet 5.0 V8				OUL; Ret				
1970	Yardley Team BRM	BRM P153	BRM P142 3.0 V12	ROC; Ret	INT	OUL; 3					
1971	Bruce McLaren Motor Racing	McLaren M19A	Ford Cosworth DFV 3.0 V8	ARG	ROC	QUE	SPR	INT	RIN	OUL	VIC; Ret
1973	UOP Shadow Racing Team	Shadow DN1	Ford Cosworth DFV 3.0 V8	ROC	INT; Ret						
1977	Shadow Racing Team	Shadow DN8	Ford Cosworth DFV 3.0 V8	ROC; 5							

=== Complete 24 Hours of Le Mans results ===
Year	Team	Co-drivers	Car	Class	Laps	Pos.	Class pos.
1968	(United Kingdom) JW Automotive Engineering	(Australia) Brian Muir	Ford GT40 Mk.I	S 5.0	15	DNF	DNF
1969	(United Kingdom) JW Automotive Engineering	(Belgium) Jacky Ickx	Ford GT40 Mk.I	S 5.0	372	**1st**	**1st**
1971	(United Kingdom) JW Automotive Engineering	(Mexico) Pedro Rodríguez	Porsche 917LH	S 5.0	187	DNF	DNF

=== Complete Canadian-American Challenge Cup results ===
(key) (Races in bold indicate pole position) (Races in italics indicate fastest lap)

Year	Team	Car	Engine	1	2	3	4	5	6	7	8	9	10	11	Pos	Points
1969	Autocoast Titanium Racing	Autocoast Ti 22	Chevrolet V8	MOS	MTR	WGL	EDM	MOH	ROA	BRI	MCH	LAG; 13	RIV; Ret	TWS; Ret	NC	0
1970	Autocoast Titanium Racing	Autocoast Ti 22	Chevrolet V8	MOS; 2	MTR; Ret	WGL	EDM	MOH	ROA	ATL	BRA	LAG; 2	RIV; 2		5th	45
1971	Advanced Vehicle Systems	Shadow Mk.2	Chevrolet V8	MOS	MTR; Ret	ATL; Ret	WGL; Ret	MOH	ROA; 12	BRA; Ret	EDM; 3	LAG; Ret	RIV; Ret		14th	12
1972	Advanced Vehicle Systems	Shadow Mk.3	Chevrolet V8	MOS; Ret	ATL; Ret	WGL; Ret	MOH; 2	ROA; Ret	BRA; 3	EDM; Ret	LAG; Ret	RIV; 4			8th	37
1973	Advanced Vehicle Systems	Shadow DN2	Chevrolet V8	MOS; Ret	ATL; Ret	WGL; Ret	MOH; 8	ROA; DNS	EDM; 3	LAG; 2	RIV; Ret				9th	30
1974	Phoenix Racing Organisations	Shadow DN4	Chevrolet V8	**MOS**; 1	ATL; 1	WGL; 1	MOH; 1	ROA; 9							1st	82

=== NASCAR ===
(key) (Bold – Pole position awarded by qualifying time. Italics – Pole position earned by points standings or practice time. * – Most laps led.)

==== Grand National Series ====
NASCAR Grand National Series results
Year	Team	No.	Make	1	2	3	4	5	6	7	8	9	10	11	12	13	14	15	16	17	18	19	20	21	22	23	24	25	26	27	28	29	30	31	32	33	34	35	36	37	38	39	40	41	42	43	44	45	46	47	48	NGNC	Pts	Ref
1971	James Mason	87	Mercury	RSD	DAY	DAY	DAY	ONT	RCH	CAR	HCY	BRI	ATL	CLB	GPS	SMR	NWS	MAR	DAR	SBO	TAL	ASH	KPT	CLT	DOV	MCH	RSD	HOU	GPS	DAY	BRI	AST	ISP	TRN	NSV	ATL	BGS	ONA	MCH	TAL	CLB	HCY	DAR	MAR	CLT	DOV	CAR	MGR	RCH	NWS	TWS; 32	N/A	-	

==== Winston Cup Series ====
NASCAR Winston Cup Series results
Year	Team	No.	Make	1	2	3	4	5	6	7	8	9	10	11	12	13	14	15	16	17	18	19	20	21	22	23	24	25	26	27	28	29	30	31	NWCC	Pts	Ref
1972	Frasson Racing	78	Dodge	RSD	DAY; DNQ	RCH	ONT																												N/A	-	
1972	Donlavey Racing	90	Ford					CAR; 40	ATL	BRI	DAR; 22	NWS	MAR	TAL; 44	CLT; 32	DOV; 4	MCH	RSD	TWS; 36	DAY; 25	BRI	TRN	ATL	TAL	MCH	NSV	DAR	RCH	DOV	MAR	NWS	CLT	CAR	TWS	N/A	-	

== Notes ==
Sporting positions
Preceded by Pedro Rodriguez; Lucien Bianchi	Winner of the 24 Hours of Le Mans; 1969; With: Jacky Ickx	Succeeded by Hans Herrmann; Richard Attwood
Preceded by Mark Donohue	Can-Am; Champion; 1974	Succeeded by Patrick Tambay (1977)
