= Pedro Rodríguez (racing driver) =

Mexican racing driver (1940–1971)

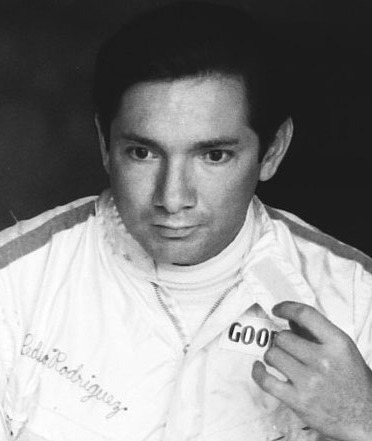
- Rodríguez at the 1968 German Grand Prix
- Born: Pedro Rodríguez de la Vega; 18 January 1940; Mexico City, Mexico
- Died: 11 July 1971 (aged 31); Norisring, Nuremberg, West Germany
- Spouse: Angelina Damy (m. 1961)
- Relatives: Ricardo Rodríguez (brother)

Formula One World Championship career
- Nationality: (Mexico) Mexican
- Active years: 1963–1971
- Team(s): Lotus, Ferrari, Cooper, BRM, Parnell
- Entries: 55
- Championships: 0
- Wins: 2
- Podiums: 7
- Career points: 71
- Pole positions: 0
- Fastest laps: 1
- First entry: 1963 United States Grand Prix
- First win: 1967 South African Grand Prix
- Last win: 1970 Belgian Grand Prix
- Last entry: 1971 French Grand Prix

24 Hours of Le Mans career
- Years: 1958–1971
- Teams: NART, OSCA, Ferrari, Ford
- Best finish: 1st (1968)
- Class wins: 2 (1965, 1968)

Pedro Rodríguez de la Vega (18 January 1940 – 11 July 1971) was a Mexican racing driver, who competed in Formula One from 1963 to 1971. Rodríguez won two Formula One Grands Prix across nine seasons. In endurance racing, Rodríguez won the 24 Hours of Le Mans in 1968 with Ford, and was a two-time winner of the 24 Hours of Daytona with Porsche.

Born and raised in Mexico City, Rodríguez was the older brother of racing driver Ricardo Rodríguez, who became the first Mexican driver to compete in Formula One in 1961. Both brothers started racing at an early age, first on motorbikes and then moving to cars. Following his brother's death in a racing accident in 1962, Pedro briefly considered retiring from racing, but decided to carry on. In sportscar racing his first major win was with his brother in the 1961 Paris 1000km, driving a Ferrari 250 GT. He began his Formula One career in 1963, won the 1967 South African Grand Prix in a Cooper and the 1970 Belgian Grand Prix in a BRM. He won the 1968 24 Hours of Le Mans in a Ford GT40 and won eight races in the Porsche 917 across 1970 and 1971.

In July 1971, Rodríguez was killed at the Norisring in West Germany, driving a Ferrari 512 M in an Interserie sportscar race.

== Personal life ==
Rodríguez was born in Mexico City, Mexico, the son of Pedro Natalio Rodríguez and Concepción De la Vega. He had an older sister, Conchita, and three younger brothers: Ricardo, Federico (died at two months of age) and Alejandro.

At the age of 15, Rodríguez's father sent him to Western Military Academy in Alton, Illinois, in order to learn English and to develop more discipline.

The Rodríguez brothers raced bicycles and motorcycles, becoming Mexican national motorcycle champions in 1953 and 1954. Pedro made his international debut in cars at Nassau in 1957 in a Ferrari.

Rodríguez married Angelina (née Damy), in Mexico in 1961, although he had a girlfriend in England, Glenda Foreman, with whom he lived in Bray on Thames in his later years, but left no children.

Rodríguez always traveled with a Mexican flag and a record of the national anthem because when he won the 1967 South African GP the organizers did not have the Mexican anthem, and instead played the Mexican hat dance.

Jo Ramírez was a very close friend to both Rodríguez and his younger brother, Ricardo.

== Career ==
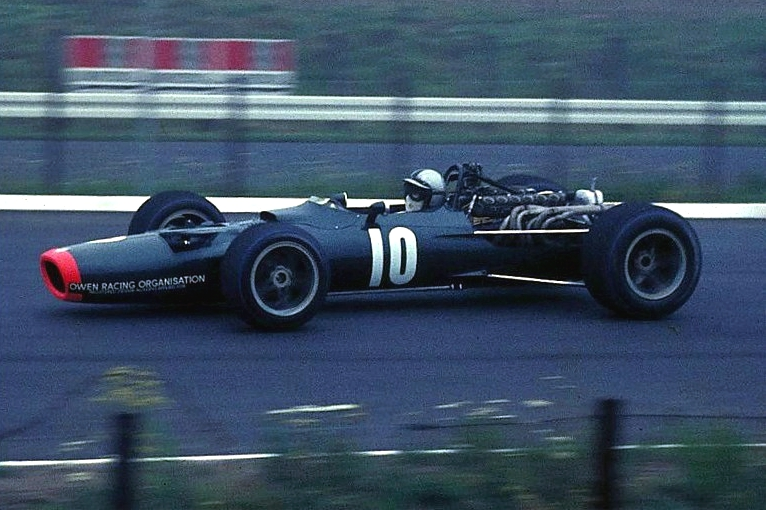
Rodríguez in his BRM P133 during the 1968 German Grand Prix.

Rodríguez began racing with bicycles at eight years old. He was a class winner in the Mexican Championship by 1950. He started racing a 125 cc (7.6 cu in) Adler motorcycle, winning Mexico's national championship in 1952 and 1954. In 1952, he entered a rally in a Ford, but achieved little. He returned to racing full-time in 1955, at 15, entering a Jaguar XK120 or Porsche 1600S in local contests.

At the end of 1957, Rodríguez (who had been driving a Chevrolet Corvette in Mexico) and his brother entered the Nassau Speed Week competition, where the wild-driving elder brother wrecked his Ferrari 500 TR.

The 18-year-old Rodríguez shared a 500 TR at Le Mans, entered by U.S. importer Luigi Chinetti, with José Behra, brother of Jean Behra, as his co-driver; the car did not finish, after a radiator hose puncture. Rodríguez came back every year to Le Mans, fourteen times in total, and won in 1968, co-driving with Belgian Lucien Bianchi, sharing a Ford GT40 for the JW–Gulf team.

At the Reims 12-hours in 1958, Rodríguez and Behra placed second in class (eighth overall) in their Porsche Carrera, while Rodríguez came second in a Ferrari 250 TR at Nassau at the end of the season.

Rodríguez went to Europe to race starting in 1959, sharing a Porsche 1600 S with Leo Levine at the Nurbürgring 1000 km, which came in second in class (thirteenth overall). He shared a 750 cc (46 cu in) O.S.C.A. with his brother for Le Mans, which broke.

At Cuba's 1960 Liberty Grand Prix, Rodríguez's 250TR followed Stirling Moss's winning Maserati Tipo 61 home, in second. At Sebring, his Dino 196 S failed to finish. Rodríguez claimed seventh at the 1960 Targa Florio, again in the 196 S, which spent time off the pavement as well as on. He retired from that year's Nürburgring 1000 km, and from Le Mans.

In 1961, Rodríguez entered Formula Junior. He returned also to Sebring, sharing a 250TR with his brother which suffered electrical trouble and came third. The duo also failed to finish that year's Targa Florio or Nürburgring 1000 km, but did win the Paris 1000 km. An ongoing duel with the works Ferraris at Le Mans, which ultimately resulted in engine failure only two hours from the end, attracted the attention of Enzo Ferrari, who offered them Formula One rides with his team. Pedro declined, having "a motor business in Mexico City to run".

Despite his refusal, Rodríguez kept racing, and in 1962 entered at Sebring, the Nürburgring, and Le Mans, but failed to finish each time. He won at Bridgehampton, in a Ferrari 330 TRI/LM, and shared a 250 GTO with his brother to win the Paris 1000 km, the second year in a row.

After Ferrari refused to enter the 1962 Mexican Grand Prix, the first to be held in Mexico, Rodríguez and his younger brother both found rides of their own. After his brother was killed in a horrific accident in practice, Rodríguez withdrew. He considered retiring from racing. However, in 1963 he won the Daytona Continental in a 250GTO entered by North American Racing Team. He came third at Sebring, sharing a 330TR/LM with Graham Hill. He failed to qualify at Indianapolis, in an Aston Martin-powered Cooper T54, but took part in his first Grand Prix in the works Lotus at Watkins Glen and Magdalena Mixhuca. Rodríguez failed to finish both times.

Also in 1963, driving for Kjell Qvale Racing, he won his second USRRC ( FIA Group 7 cars) event in the Huffaker chassis#2 Mk8 GENIE/Chevrolet, then went on to win again in their chassis#3 Mk8 GENIE/Ford

For 1964, Rodríguez again won the Daytona Continental, as well as the sports car Canadian Grand Prix, was second at the Paris 1000 km, and third in the Bahamas Tourist Trophy. In single-seater racing, he recorded a sixth in the Ferrari 156 at Mexico.

In 1965, Rodríguez's Lotus 33-Climax was fourth at the Daily Express Silverstone Trophy, fifth at the U.S. Grand Prix and seventh in the Mexican Grand Prix in a Ferrari. He won the Reims 12-Hours in a Ferrari 365 P2 he shared with Jean Guichet, and scored a third at the Canadian Sports Car Grand Prix.

Rodríguez drove again for Lotus in four events in 1966, retiring on every occasion. He also deputised for Jim Clark in the Formula Two event at Rouen. At the start of the 1967 season, Rodríguez won for the first time in only his ninth Grand Prix, at Kyalami. This was the first ever Grand Prix win for a Mexican driver. Cooper manager Roy Salvadori allowed Rodríguez to drive the practice car, over the objections of teammate Jochen Rindt, who had demanded Rodríguez's car, with strong support from Rindt's close friend Jackie Stewart. Rodríguez's smooth, consistent driving earned him victory after Denny Hulme had had a lengthy pit stop and local privateer John Love's Tasman Cooper needed a late fuel stop. Rindt, by contrast, retired the other Cooper-Maserati after 38 laps. Rodríguez drove a controlled season in 1967 as No. 2 to Rindt. Though usually slower than his teammate, he built up experience in the older and heavier T81, while Rindt was given the improved T81B and later the brand new T86. A mid-season accident in a Protos-Ford, at the Formula Two event at Enna, sidelined him for three Grand Prix. Rodríguez was only marginally slower than Rindt in the Dutch Grand Prix, also the only other race in the season where the Coopers were competitive.

Rodríguez's performance at Zandvoort earned Rodríguez a better drive with BRM in 1968. Rodríguez proved himself excellent in the wet at Zandvoort and Rouen where he got his only fastest lap in F1 during the French GP. Lack of power meant he had to settle for second behind Bruce McLaren during the Belgian GP at Francorchamps.

The BRM P133 faded through the year from lack of testing time after the death of Mike Spence, whom the team's owners favoured. Nevertheless, Rodríguez led the Spanish Grand Prix from Chris Amon for 28 laps until he made a mistake and spun off. At the end of the year, despite Rodríguez's good performances, BRM team manager Louis Stanley released Rodríguez to the Parnell BRM privateer team.

The Reg Parnell Racing BRMs proved to have hopeless engines, and after Monaco, Rodríguez left and signed for Ferrari for the remainder of the 1969 Grand Prix and sports car series.

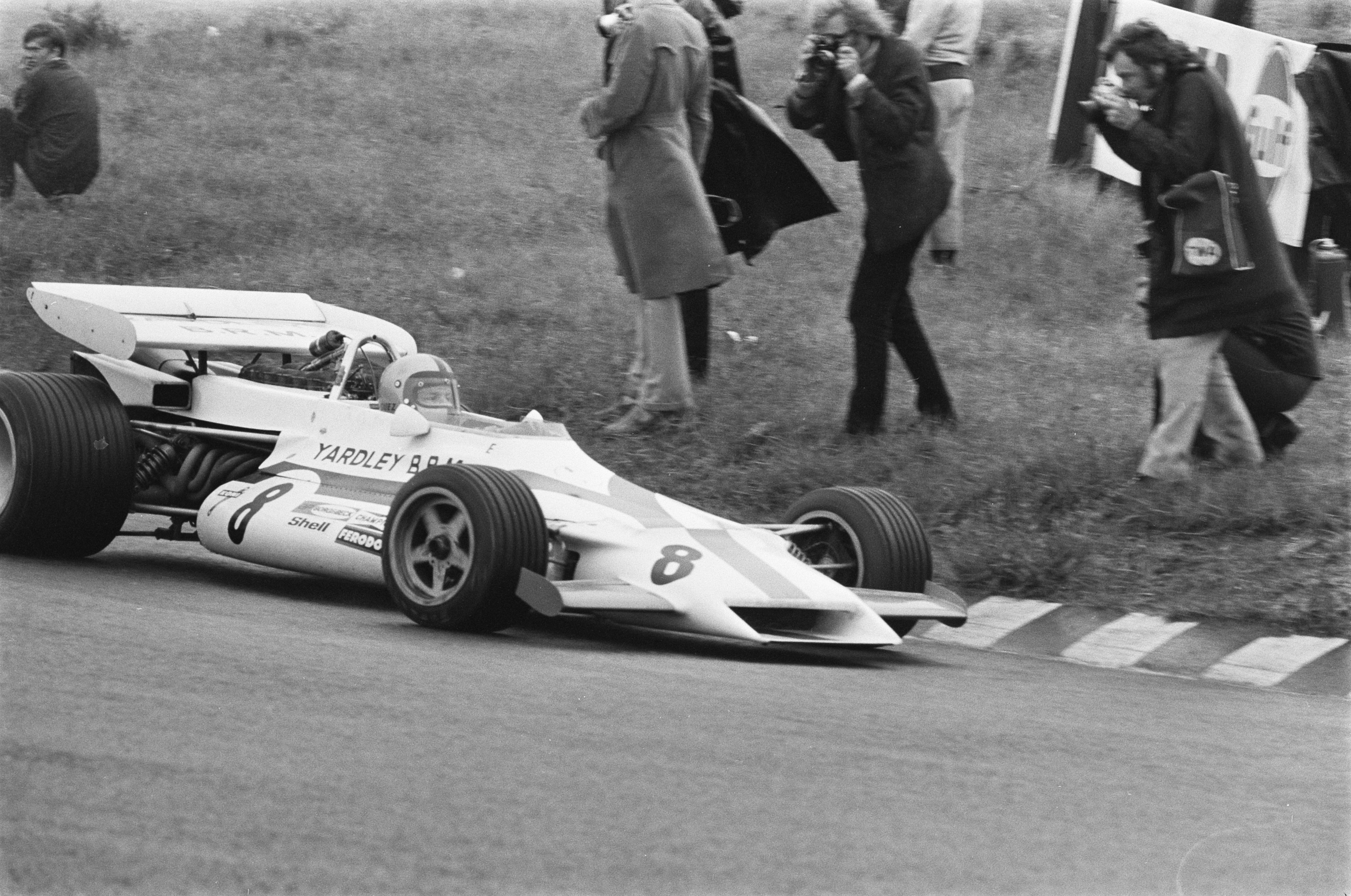
Pedro Rodríguez second place, 20 June 1971 North Holland, Zandvoort. This would be the last podium for Rodríguez who would die 21 days later.

Reentering F1 in the British Grand Prix, Rodríguez matched teammate Amon's pace in practice and led Amon by a whisker in the race. The uncompetitive 312s ran midfield until Rodríguez's car broke and Amon's engine blew for the second race in a row. Given the hopelessness of the 312 V12, the frustration of his drivers, and the slow progress with getting the new flat-12 F1 car ready, Enzo Ferrari would rather have run two Italian drivers for the rest of the season, but the Brambilla brothers, Vittorio and Ernesto, proved too slow. So, Ferrari ran Rodríguez in the last four races of the season, in NART American racing colours for the North American races, but still, effectively, as a Ferrari works team. All in all, Rodríguez managed a fourth place in 1968; sixth in 1964, 1967 and 1970; and seventh in 1965 and 1969; while retiring in 1963 and 1966; in his eight home races in Mexico, but Ferrari didn't offer him a ride for 1970.

BRM only offered him a ride in 1970 after John Surtees decided to leave to set up his own team at the last minute. For most of 1970, Stanley clearly favoured Jackie Oliver as number one driver, perhaps partly in response to Stewart's opinion of Rodríguez and possibly because of his "old-boys' club" of Englishmen at the team. At Francorchamps, Rodríguez won with his BRM P153 over the new March of Chris Amon by just 1.1 seconds and with an average speed of 149.94 mph (241.31 km/h), then the highest average speed in the history of F1, Jean-Pierre Beltoise got the third place in a Matra.

The power of the V12 engines was particularly suited to the fast circuits with few really slow corners, such as Francorchamps, Monza, and to a degree Brands Hatch and the Nürburgring, and that was usually the case with the BRM, Matra, and Weslake engined cars. A drive at Circuit Mont-Tremblant saw him finish fourth. The need to pit in the last laps for fuel prevented him from winning at Watkins Glen, the highest paying event of the year at the time (US$50,000).The winner was Emerson Fittipaldi, who won his first race in F1.

After many years racing for Ferrari in the World Championship of Makes for sports cars, Rodríguez signed for JW-Gulf-Porsche in 1970 and over the next two years won eight races driving a Porsche 917, contributing to Porsche winning in the World Sportscar Championship.

Rodríguez competed in multiple motorsport disciplines, including Can-Am, NASCAR, and rallying. In 1970, he also won a North American ice racing championship in an event held at Sand Lake, after being invited by the Alaska Sports Car Club in Anchorage.

Rodríguez debuted in NASCAR at Trenton Speedway in 1959, finishing 6th. At the 1963 Firecracker 400 he qualified ninth but retired after an engine failure. The Mexican finished fifth in the 1965 World 600, his best result. At the 1971 Daytona 500 he finished 13th. His last NASCAR race was Miller High Life 500, where he retired early with electrical issues

Rodríguez drove a Ferrari 312 P Coupé in the CanAm round of Bridgehampton in 1969, finishing fifth. In 1970, he finished third at Riverside and fifth at Laguna Seca Raceway with a factory BRM P154.

The 1971 Formula One season could have seen Rodríguez as a championship contender, with a BRM P160 being prepared by Tony Southgate, and for once BRM had consistently good engines. BRM, however, was overextended, trying to run three, and later four, cars. Rodríguez challenged Jacky Ickx in the rain during the Dutch Grand Prix, and only just failed to win.

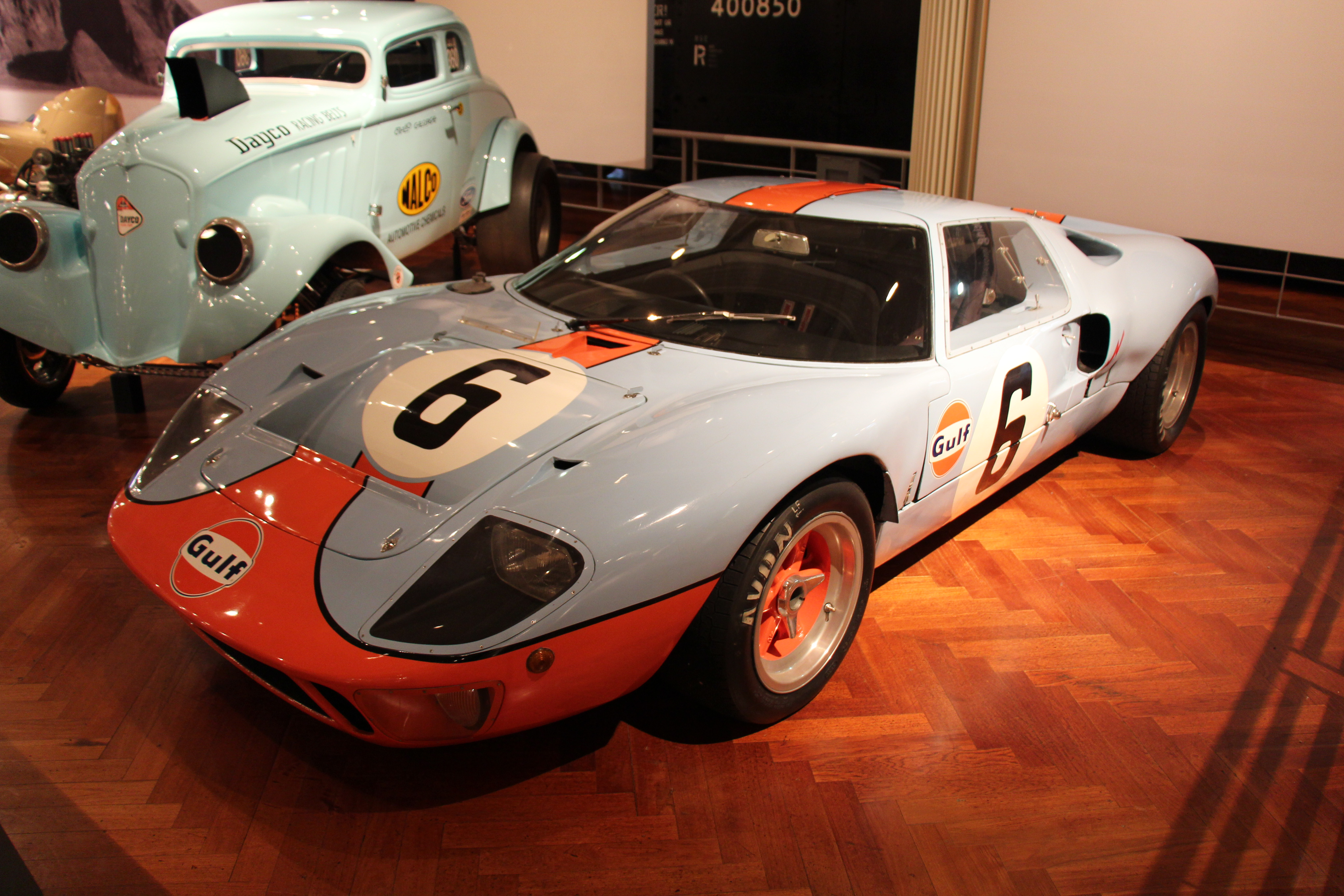
The Ford GT40 in which Rodríguez and Lucien Bianchi won the 1968 24 Hours of Le Mans

== Death ==
Rodríguez was killed in an Interserie sports car race at Norisring in Nuremberg, West Germany, on 11 July 1971. Rodríguez was at the wheel of a Ferrari 512 M of Herbert Müller Racing, his friend and teammate at the Targa Florio in 1971. A contemporary source reported that trackside photographers noticed his right front tyre coming away from the rim under heavy braking for the sharp s-bend as early as the 10th lap. On lap 12, the tyre came off completely, sending the car into a wall before rebounding across the track and catching fire. He died shortly after he was extracted from the wreck.

== Legacy ==
In 2016, in an academic paper that reported a mathematical modeling study that assessed the relative influence of driver and machine, Rodríguez was ranked the 24th-best Formula One driver of all time.

After winning the LMP2 class at the 2013 24 Hours of Le Mans, the first class victory for a Mexican driver since Rodríguez, Ricardo González recognized Rodríguez as his hero.

== Commemoration ==
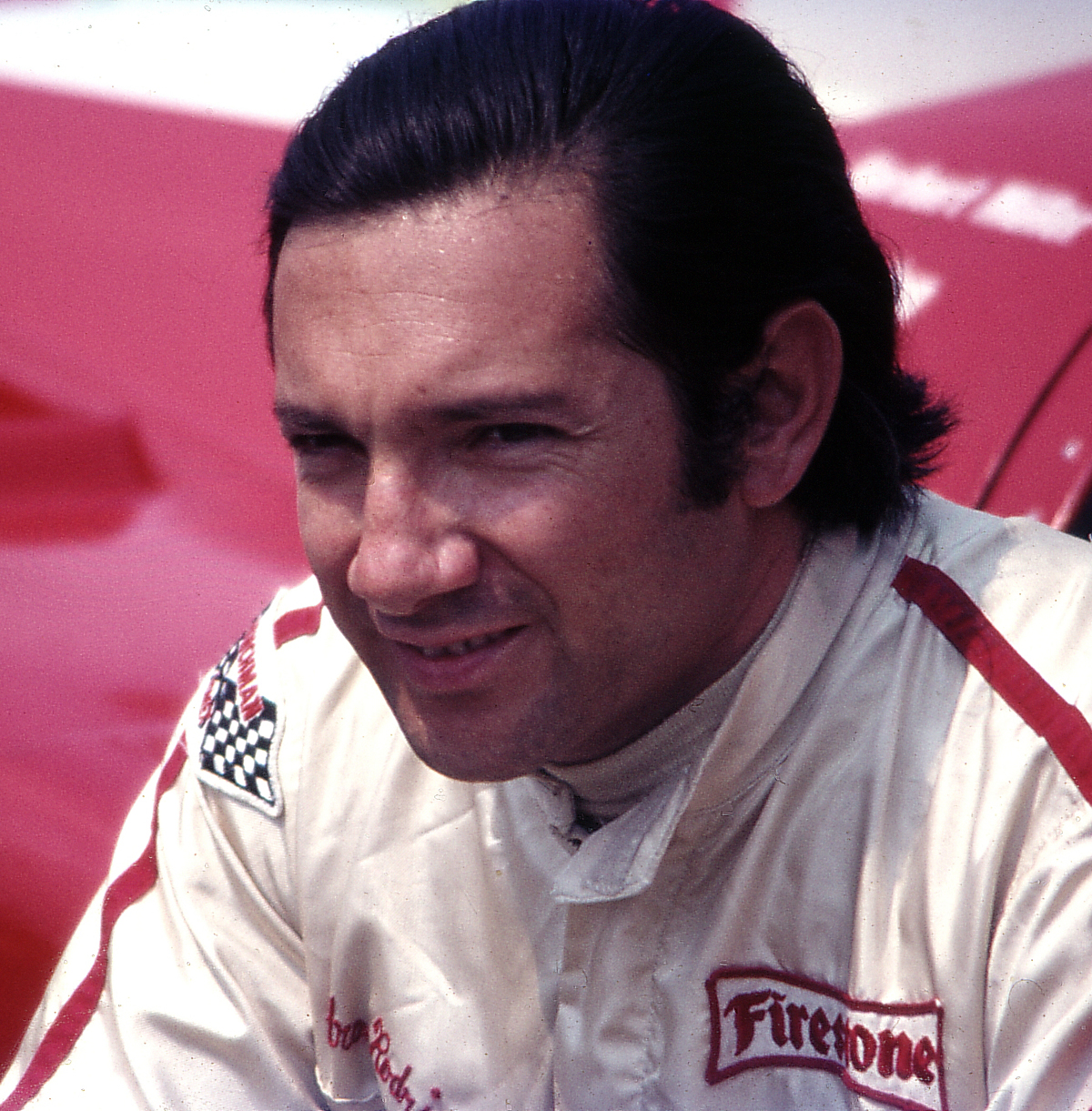
Rodríguez at the 1971 French GP (photograph taken seven days before his death)

The first hairpin at Daytona International Speedway (the right-hand hairpin) is named the Pedro Rodríguez curve. In 1973 the Mexico City race track Magdalena Mixuhca, where F1, Champ Car, NASCAR and other series race was renamed for him and Ricardo: Autódromo Hermanos Rodríguez (Rodríguez Brothers Autodrome).

In July 2006, a bronze plaque was placed at the site of his crash in Nuremberg, a joint effort by Scuderia Rodríguez (the friends foundation) and the city authorities. Its Secretary General, Carlos Jalife, published the Rodríguez brothers' biography in December 2006, with an English translation which won the Motor Press Guild Book of the Year award in 2009.

Sergio Pérez wore a specially designed crash helmet tributing Pedro Rodríguez for the 2022 Monaco Grand Prix in which he went on to claim his third win in Formula One. The helmet featured Rodríguez's helmet colours and, on the top, Rodríguez's and Perez's combined wins and podiums before Perez's victory in the 2022 Monaco Grand Prix, as the only two Mexican Formula One drivers to achieve race victories. Below the statistics was written "AND COUNTING" and the phrase "GRACIAS PEDRO" (thank you Pedro) below that.

== BRM P153 ==
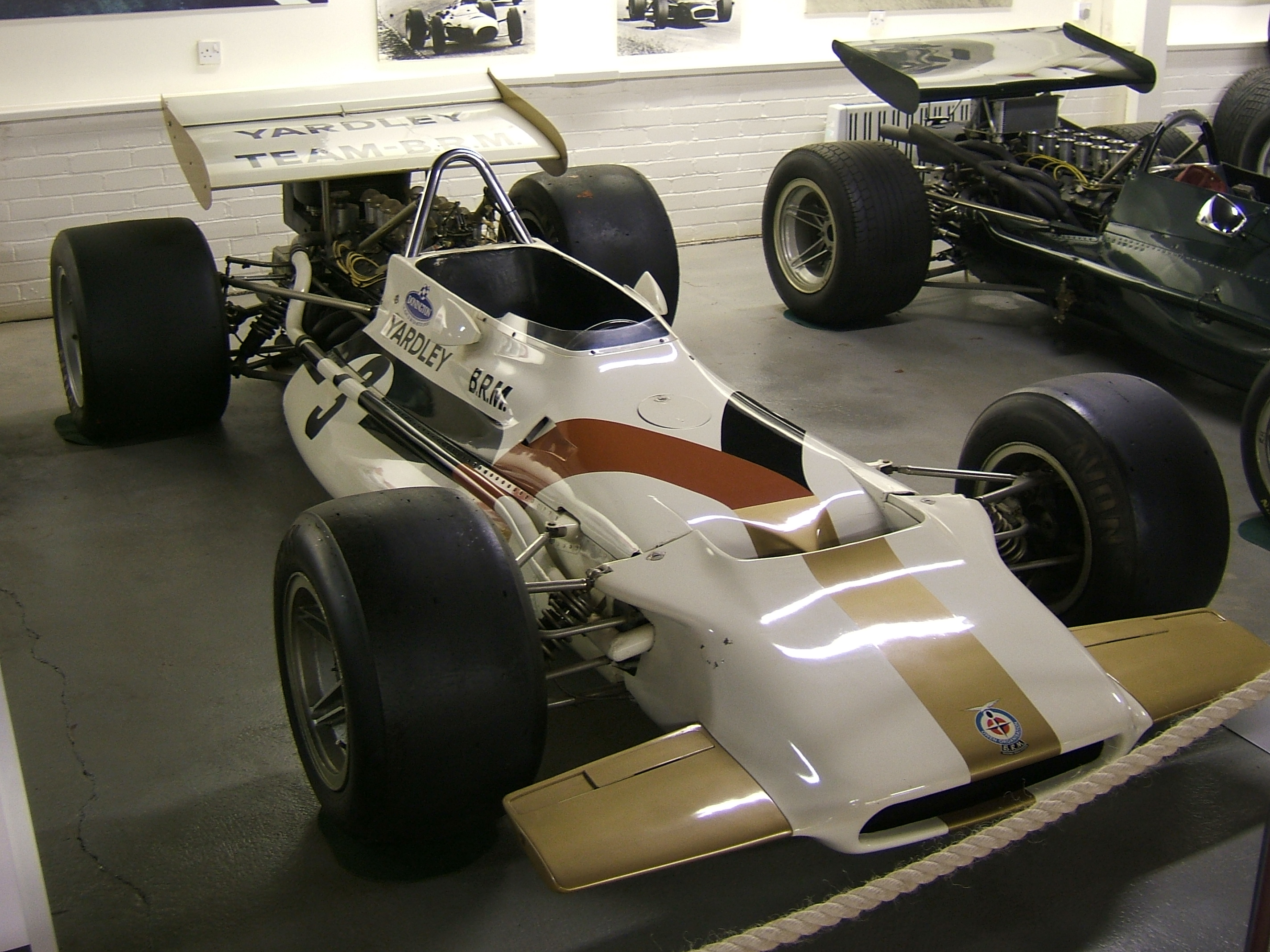
BRM P153

In 2024, the Mexican driver Adrián Fernández acquired the BRM P153 with which Rodríguez won the 1970 Belgian Grand Prix from a private collector.

== Racing record ==
=== Formula One World Championship results ===
(key) (Races in bold indicate pole position; races in italics indicate fastest lap)

Year	Entrant	Chassis	Engine	1	2	3	4	5	6	7	8	9	10	11	12	13	WDC	Pts.
1963	Team Lotus	Lotus 25	Climax FWMV 1.5 V8	MON	BEL	NED	FRA	GBR	GER	ITA	USA; Ret	MEX; Ret	RSA				NC	0
1964	North American Racing Team	Ferrari 156 Aero	Ferrari 178 1.5 V6	MON	NED	BEL	FRA	GBR	GER	AUT	ITA	USA	MEX; 6				22nd	1
1965	North American Racing Team	Ferrari 1512	Ferrari 207 1.5 V12	RSA	MON	BEL	FRA	GBR	NED	GER	ITA	USA; 5	MEX; 7				14th	2
1966	Team Lotus	Lotus 33	Climax FWMV 2.0 V8	MON	BEL	FRA; Ret	GBR	NED				MEX; Ret					NC	0
1966	Team Lotus	Lotus 33	BRM P60 2.0 V8								USA; Ret						NC	0
1966	Team Lotus	Lotus 44 (F2)	Ford Cosworth SCA 1.0 L4						GER; Ret^{1}	ITA							NC	0
1967	Cooper Car Company	Cooper T81	Maserati 9/F1 3.0 V12	RSA; 1	MON; 5	NED; Ret	BEL; 9	FRA; 6	GBR; 5	GER; 8	CAN	ITA	USA	MEX; 6			6th	15
1968	Owen Racing Organisation	BRM P126	BRM P101 3.0 V12	RSA; Ret													6th	18
1968	Owen Racing Organisation	BRM P133	BRM P101 3.0 V12		ESP; Ret	MON; Ret	BEL; 2	NED; 3	FRA; NC	GBR; Ret	GER; 6		CAN; 3	USA; Ret	MEX; 4		6th	18
1968	Owen Racing Organisation	BRM P138	BRM P101 3.0 V12									ITA; Ret					6th	18
1969	Reg Parnell Racing	BRM P126	BRM P101 3.0 V12	RSA; Ret	ESP; Ret	MON; Ret											14th	3
1969	Scuderia Ferrari SpA SEFAC	Ferrari 312/69	Ferrari 255C 3.0 V12				NED; DNA	FRA	GBR; Ret	GER	ITA; 6						14th	3
1969	North American Racing Team	Ferrari 312/69	Ferrari 255C 3.0 V12									CAN; Ret	USA; 5	MEX; 7			14th	3
1970	Owen Racing Organisation	BRM P153	BRM P142 3.0 V12	RSA; 9													7th	23
1970	Yardley Team BRM	BRM P153	BRM P142 3.0 V12		ESP; Ret	MON; 6	BEL; 1	NED; 10	FRA; Ret	GBR; Ret	GER; Ret	AUT; 4	ITA; Ret	CAN; 4	USA; 2	MEX; 6	7th	23
1971	Yardley Team BRM	BRM P160	BRM P142 3.0 V12	RSA; Ret	ESP; 4	MON; 9	NED; 2	FRA; Ret	GBR	GER	AUT	ITA	CAN	USA			10th	9

- ^{1} – Ineligible for Formula One points, because he drove with a Formula Two car.

=== Formula One Non-Championship results ===
(key) (Races in bold indicate pole position; races in italics indicate fastest lap)

Year	Entrant	Chassis	Engine	1	2	3	4	5	6	7	8
1965	Team Lotus	Lotus 25	Climax V8	ROC	SYR	SMT	INT; 4	MED	RAN		
1967	Cooper Car Company	Cooper T81	Maserati V12	ROC; 4	SPC	INT	SYR	OUL	ESP		
1968	Owen Racing Organisation	BRM P133	BRM V12	ROC; 2	INT; Ret						
1968	Reg Parnell Racing	BRM P126	BRM V12			OUL; 4					
1969	Reg Parnell Racing	BRM P126	BRM V12	ROC; Ret	INT; 8	MAD	OUL				
1971	Yardley Team BRM	BRM P160	BRM V12	ARG	ROC	QUE; 10	SPR; 1	INT; 4	RIN	OUL	VIC

=== Complete Tasman Series results ===
(key) (Races in bold indicate pole position; races in italics indicate fastest lap)

Year	Team	Chassis	Engine	1	2	3	4	5	6	7	8	Rank	Pts
1968	Owen Racing Organization	BRM P261	BRM 2.1 V8	PUK; Ret		WIG; 6			WAR; 6		LON; 2	7	8
1968	Owen Racing Organization	BRM P126	BRM 2.5 V12		LEV; Ret		TER; Ret	SUR; 10		SAN; Ret		7	8

=== Pedro Rodríguez at Ferrari ===
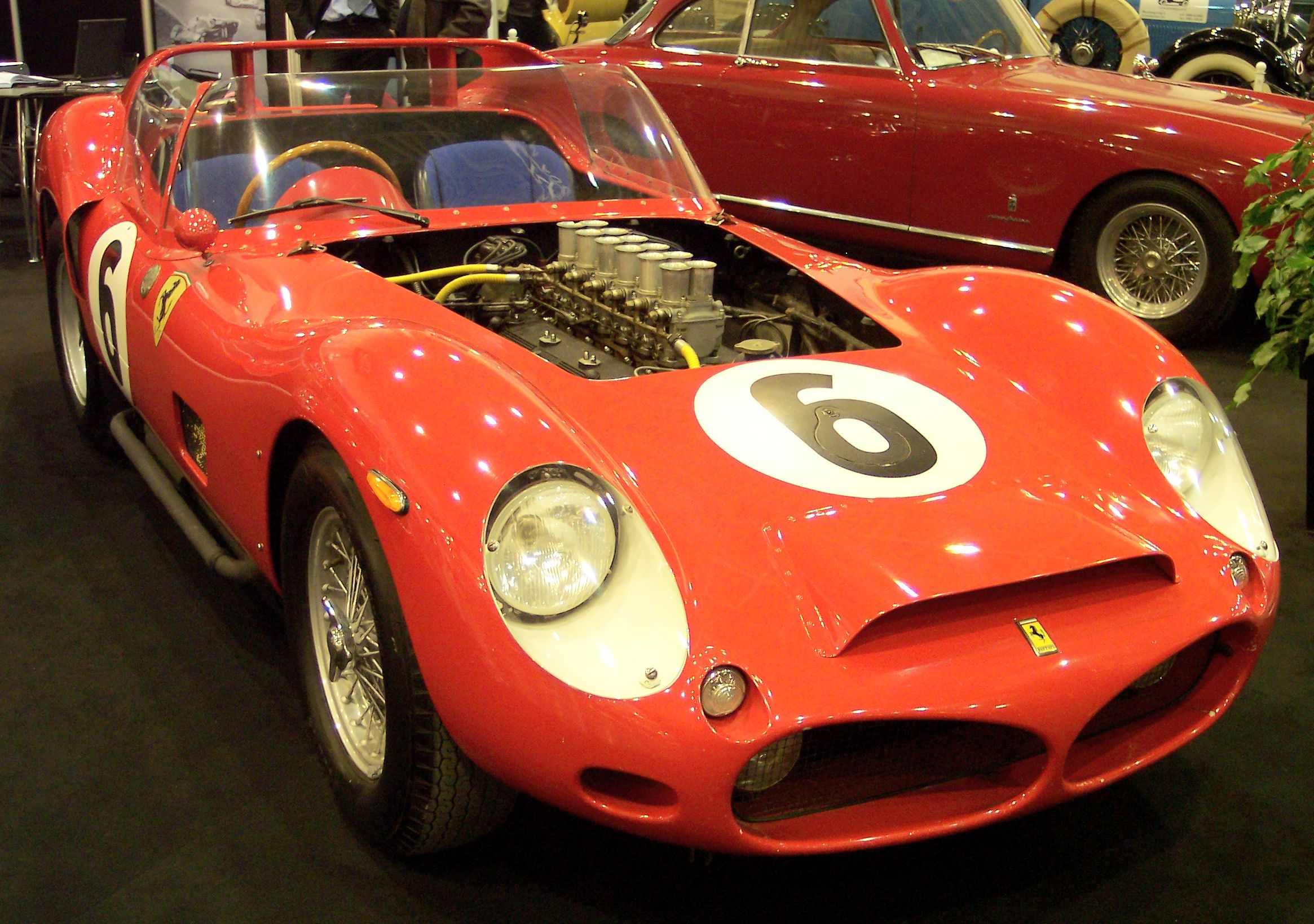
1962 Le Mans-winning Ferrari 330 TRI-LM, bought by the Rodríguezes through NART. Rodríguez raced several times in it.

Year	Race	Team	Chassis	Position	Co-driver
1957	Nassau Trophy	NART	500 TR	Ret	Solo
1957	Governor's Trophy	NART	500 TR	9	Solo
1958	24 Hours of Le Mans	NART	500 TR	5	José Behra
1958	Governor's Trophy	NART	TR 58	4	Solo
1958	Ferrari Classic	NART	TR58	**2nd**	Solo
1958	Nassau Trophy	NART	TR 58	**2nd**	Solo
1959	II Circuito del Moral	NART	TR 58	**2nd**	Solo
1959	12 Hours of Sebring	NART	TR58	Ret.	Paul O'Shea
1959	1000 km Daytona	NART	TR58	DNS	
1959	VII Circuito Avándaro	NART	58TR	8	Solo
1959	Kiwanis GP Riverside	NART	250 TR	Ret	Solo
1959	Governor's Trophy	NART	TR59	**3rd**	Solo
1959	Nassau Trophy	NART	TR59	13	Solo
1960	Cuban GP	NART	TR59	**2nd**	Solo
1960	12 Hours of Sebring	NART	Dino 196 S	Ret	Ricardo Rodríguez
1960	Targa Florio	NART	Dino 196 S	**7/3 Sport-2**	Ricardo Rodríguez
1960	1000 km Nürburgring	NART	Dino 196 S	Ret	Ricardo Rodríguez
1960	24 Hours of Le Mans	NART	TRI60	Ret	Ludovico Scarfiotti
1960	Governor's Trophy	NART	TR59/60	Ret	Solo
1960	Nassau Trophy	NART	TR59/60	**2nd**	Ricardo Rodríguez
1961	12 Hours of Sebring	NART	TR59/60	**3rd**	Ricardo Rodríguez
1961	1000 km Nürburgring	NART	TRI/60	**2nd**	Ricardo Rodríguez
1961	24 Hours of Le Mans	NART	TRI/61	Ret	Ricardo Rodríguez
1961	I GP Independencia		250 GT Cal	**1st**	Solo
1961	GP Canada Sport	NART	TRI/61	**2nd**	Solo
1961	1000 km Montlhéry	NART	250 GT SWB	**1st**	Ricardo Rodríguez
1961	Governor's Trophy	NART	TRI/61	**1st**	Solo
1961	Nassau Trophy	NART	TRI/61	**3rd**	Solo
1962	12 Hours of Sebring	NART	246 SP	Ret	Ricardo Rodríguez
1962	12 Hours of Sebring	NART	Dino 246 S	Ret	Grossman x Connell
1962	1000 km Nürburgring	NART	268 SP	**2nd**	Ricardo Rodríguez
1962	24 Hours of Le Mans	SpA Ferrari SEFAC	246 SP	Ret	Ricardo Rodríguez
1962	Double 400 Bridgehampton	NART	330 TRI/LM	**1st**	Solo
1962	GP Canada Sport	NART	330 TRI/LM	**2nd**	Solo
1962	1000 km Montlhéry	NART	250 GTO	**1st**	Ricardo Rodríguez
1963	Continental 3 Hours of Daytona	NART	250 GTO	**1st**	Solo
1963	12 Hours of Sebring	NART	330 TRI/LM	**3rd**	Graham Hill
1963	24 Hours of Le Mans	NART	330 TRI/LM	Ret	Roger Penske
1963	Governor's Trophy	NART	250 P	**2nd**	Solo
1963	Nassau Trophy	NART	250 P	**2nd**	Solo
1964	CC 250 M Daytona	NART	250 LM	Ret	Solo
1964	Continental 2000 km Daytona	NART	250 GTO	**1st**	Phil Hill
1964	12 Hours of Sebring	NART	330 P	Ret lap 40	John Fulp
1964	12 Hours of Sebring		250 GTO	7	David Piper/Mike Gammino
1964	24 Hours of Le Mans	NART	330 P	Ret	S. Hudson
1964	12 Hours of Reims	NART	250 GTO	11	Nino Vaccarella
1964	Player's Quebec	NART	275 P	**1st**	Solo
1964	Double 500 Bridgehampton	NART	275 P	**2nd**	Solo
1964	GP Canada Sport	NART	330 P	**1st**	Solo
1964	1000 km Montlhéry	NART	250 GTO	**2nd**	Jo Schlesser
1964	GT+22 Oakes Field	NART	250 GTO	**7/1 class**	Solo
1964	Nassau Tourist Trophy	NART	250 GTO	**6/1 class**	Solo
1964	Governor's Trophy	NART	330 P	**4/1 class**	Solo
1964	Nassau Thophy	NART	330 GTO	3/2 class	Solo
1965	Continental 2000 km Daytona	NART	330 P2	Ret	John Surtees
1965	Continental 2000 km Daytona	NART	275 P	Ret	Hansgen
1965	12 Hours of Sebring	NART	330 P	Ret	Graham Hill
1965	24 Hours of Le Mans	NART	365 P2	**7/1 class**	Nino Vacarella
1965	12 Hours of Reims	NART	365 P2	**1st**	Jean Guichet
1965	Double 500 Bridghampton	NART	250 GTO	**2/1 class**	Solo
1965	GP Canada Sport	NART	365 P2	**3rd**	Solo
1966	24 Hours of Daytona	NART	365 P2	4	Mario Andretti
1966	12 Hours of Sebring	NART	365 P2	Ret	Mario Andretti
1966	1000 km Nürburgring	NART	Dino 206 S	**3rd**	Richie Ginther
1966	24 Hours of Le Mans	NART	330 P3	Ret	Richie Ginther
1966	200 M Bridgehampton	NART	Dino 206 S	Ret	Solo
1966	200 M Laguna Seca	NART	Dino 206 S	18	Solo
1966	Governor's Trophy	NART	275 GTB/C	**7/1 class**	Solo
1966	Nassau Trophy	NART	Dino 206 S	**7/1 class**	Solo
1967	24 Hours of Daytona	NART	412 P	**3rd**	Jean Guichet
1967	12 Hours of Sebring	NART	206 S	Ret	Jean Guichet
1967	1000 km Monza	NART	412 P	Ret	Jean Guichet
1967	24 Hours of Le Mans	NART	412 P	Ret	Giancarlo Baghetti
1967	12 Hours of Reims	NART	Dino 206 S	Ret	Jean Guichet
1968	24 Hours of Daytona	NART	Dino 206 S	Ret	Kold
1968	Brands Hatch GP	NART	275 ML	5	Pierpoint
1969	12 Hours of Sebring	NART	330 P3	Ret	Parsons
1969	6 Hours of Brands Hatch	NART	312 P	4	Chris Amon
1969	1000 km Monza	NART	312 P	Ret	Schetty
1969	1000 km Spa	NART	312 P	**2nd**	David Piper
1969	1000 km Nürburgring	NART	312 P	5	Chris Amon
1969	24 Hours of Le Mans	NART	312 P	Ret	David Piper
1969	200 M Bridgehampton	NART	312 P	5	Solo
1970	200 M Mid Ohio	NART	512 S	11	Solo
1970	200 M Elkhart Lake	NART	512 P	7	Solo
1971	**200 miles of Norisring**	Private	512 M	Died	Solo

=== Pedro Rodríguez at Porsche ===
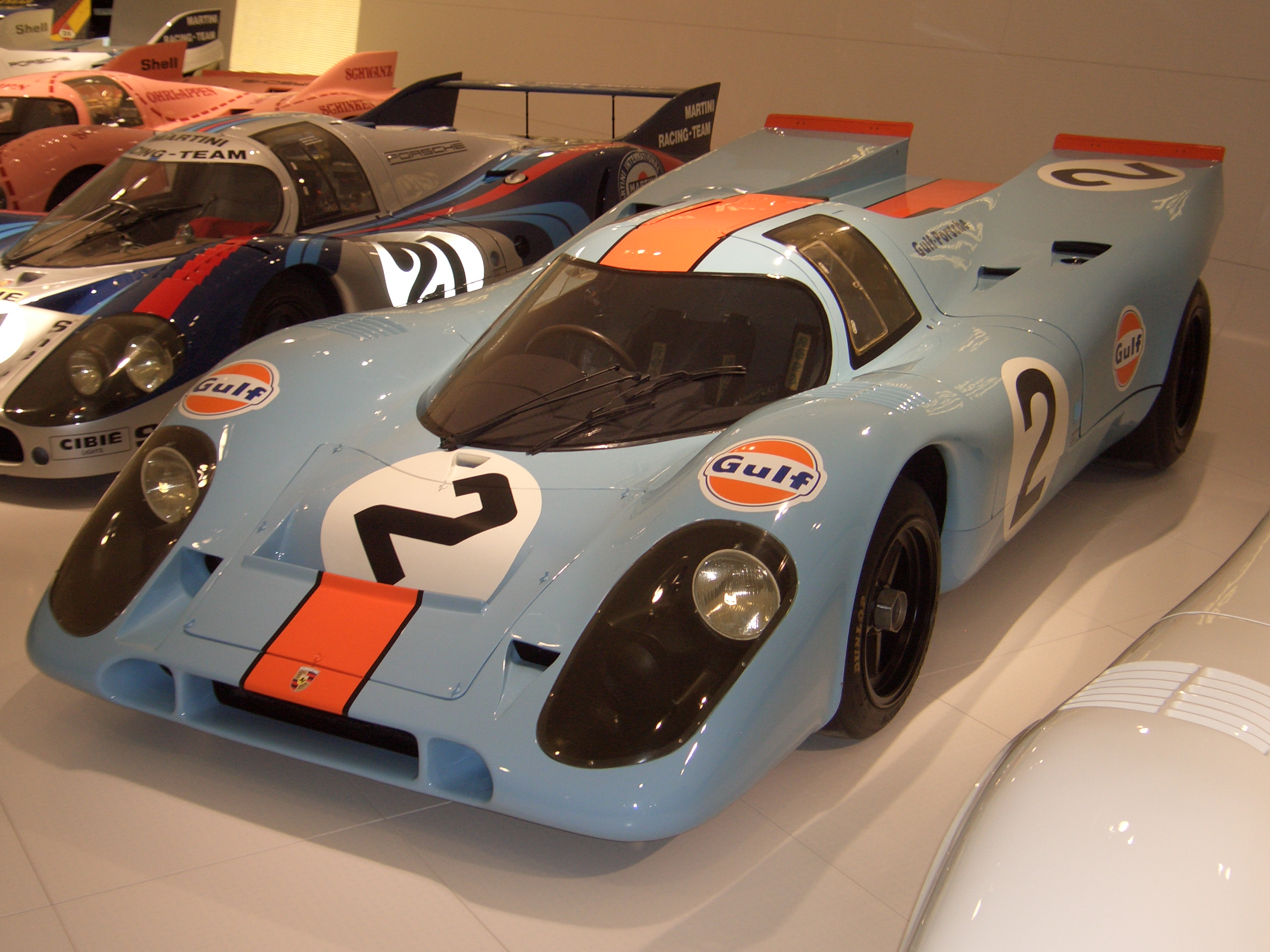
Pedro Rodríguez won eight races in 1970 and 1971 in a similar Porsche 917.

Year	Race	Team	Chassis	Position	Co-driver
1970	24 Hours of Daytona	John Wyer	917K	**1st**	Kinnunen/Redman
1970	12 Hours of Sebring	John Wyer	917K	4	Kinnunen/ Siffert
1970	1000km of Brands Hatch	John Wyer	917K	**1st**	Leo Kinnunen
1970	1000 km Monza	John Wyer	917K	**1st**	Leo Kinnunen
1970	Targa Florio	John Wyer	908-3	**2nd**	Leo Kinnunen
1970	1000 km Spa	John Wyer	917K	Ret	Leo Kinnunen
1970	1000 km Nürburgring	John Wyer	908-3	Ret	Leo Kinnunen
1970	24 Hours of Le Mans	John Wyer	917K	Ret	Leo Kinnunen
1970	6 Hours of Watkins Glen	John Wyer	917K	**1st**	Leo Kinnunen
1970	1000 km Zeltweg	John Wyer	917K	Ret	Leo Kinnunen
1971	1000 km of Buenos Aires	John Wyer	917K	Ret	Jackie Oliver
1971	24 Hours of Daytona	John Wyer	917K	**1st**	Jackie Oliver
1971	12 Hours of Sebring	John Wyer	917K	4	Jackie Oliver
1971	1000 km Brands Hatch	John Wyer	917K	Ret	Jackie Oliver
1971	1000 km Monza	John Wyer	917K	**1st**	Jackie Oliver
1971	1000 km Spa	John Wyer	917K	**1st**	Jackie Oliver
1971	Targa Florio	John Wyer	908-3	Ret	Herbert Müller
1971	1000 km Nürburgring	John Wyer	908-3	**2nd**	Oliver/Siffert
1971	24 Hours of Le Mans	John Wyer	917LH	18	Jackie Oliver
1971	1000 km Zeltweg	John Wyer	917K	**1st**	Richard Attwood

=== Pedro Rodríguez in the 24 Hours of Le Mans ===
Year	Team	Num.	Car	Cat.	Co-driver	Grid	Laps	Result
Year	Team	Num.	Engine	Cat.	Co-driver	Grid	Hours	Result
1958	(United States) North American Racing Team	25	Ferrari 500 TR58	S 2.0	(France) José Behra	33°	119	Retire (Cooling)
1958	(United States) North American Racing Team	25	Ferrari 2.0 L4	S 2.0	(France) José Behra	33°	12h	Retire (Cooling)
1959	(Italy) OSCA Automobili	51	OSCA Sport 750TN	S 750	(Mexico) Ricardo Rodríguez	11°	32	Retire (Water pump)
1959	(Italy) OSCA Automobili	51	OSCA 0.7L L4	S 750	(Mexico) Ricardo Rodríguez	11°	5h	Retire (Water pump)
1960	(Italy) Scuderia Ferrari SpA	12	Ferrari 250 TRI/60	S 3.0	(Italy) Ludovico Scarfiotti	47°	22	Retire (Fuel)
1960	(Italy) Scuderia Ferrari SpA	12	Ferrari 3.0L V12	S 3.0	(Italy) Ludovico Scarfiotti	47°	3h	Retire (Fuel)
1961	(United States) North American Racing Team	17	Ferrari 250 TRI/61	S 3.0	(Mexico) Ricardo Rodríguez	2°	305	Retire (Engine)
1961	(United States) North American Racing Team	17	Ferrari 3.0L V12	S 3.0	(Mexico) Ricardo Rodríguez	2°	23h	Retire (Engine)
1962	(Italy) SpA Ferrari SEFAC	28	Ferrari 246 SP	E 3.0	(Mexico) Ricardo Rodríguez	32°	174	Retire (Gear box)
1962	(Italy) SpA Ferrari SEFAC	28	Ferrari 2.4L V6	E 3.0	(Mexico) Ricardo Rodríguez	32°	13h	Retire (Gear box)
1963	(United States) North American Racing Team	10	Ferrari 330 TRI/LM	P +3.0	(United States) Roger Penske	**1°**	113	Retire (Accident)
1963	(United States) North American Racing Team	10	Ferrari 4.0L V12	P +3.0	(United States) Roger Penske	**1°**	9h	Retire (Accident)
1964	(United States) North American Racing Team	15	Ferrari 330 P	P 5.0	(United States) Skip Hudson	3°	58	Retire (Engine)
1964	(United States) North American Racing Team	15	Ferrari 4.0 L V12	P 5.0	(United States) Skip Hudson	3°	5h	Retire (Engine)
1965	(United States) North American Racing Team	18	Ferrari 365 P2/P1	P 5.0	(Italy) Nino Vaccarella	6°	320	7°
1965	(United States) North American Racing Team	18	Ferrari 4.4 L V12	P 5.0	(Italy) Nino Vaccarella	6°	24h	7°
1966	(United States) North American Racing Team	27	Ferrari 330 P3 Spyder	P 5.0	(United States) Richie Ginther	5°	151	Retire (Gear box)
1966	(United States) North American Racing Team	27	Ferrari 4.0 L V12	P 5.0	(United States) Richie Ginther	5°	10h	Retire (Gear box)
1967	(United States) North American Racing Team	25	Ferrari 330 P3	P 5.0	(Italy) Giancarlo Baghetti	8°	144	Retire (Pistons)
1967	(United States) North American Racing Team	25	Ferrari 4.0 L V12	P 5.0	(Italy) Giancarlo Baghetti	8°	11h	Retire (Pistons)
**1968**	(United Kingdom) **John Wyer Automotive Engineering**	**9**	**Ford GT40** **Mk I**	**S 5.0**	(Belgium) **Lucien Bianchi**	**4°**	**331**	**Winner**
**1968**	(United Kingdom) **John Wyer Automotive Engineering**	**9**	**Ford** **4.9 L** **V8**	**S 5.0**	(Belgium) **Lucien Bianchi**	**4°**	**24h**	**Winner**
1969	(Italy) SpA Ferrari SEFAC	18	Ferrari 312 P Coupé	P 3.0	(United Kingdom) David Piper	9°	223	Retire (Oil leak)
1969	(Italy) SpA Ferrari SEFAC	18	Ferrari 3.0 L V12	P 3.0	(United Kingdom) David Piper	9°	16h	Retire (Oil leak)
1970	(United Kingdom) John Wyer Automotive Engineering	21	Porsche 917K	S 5.0	(Finland) Leo Kinnunen	5°	22	Retire (Engine)
1970	(United Kingdom) John Wyer Automotive Engineering	21	Porsche 4.9 L Flat 12	S 5.0	(Finland) Leo Kinnunen	5°	4h	Retire (Engine)
1971	(United Kingdom) John Wyer Automotive Engineering	18	Porsche 917L	S 5.0	(United Kingdom) Jackie Oliver	**1°**	-	Retire (Oil leak)
1971	(United Kingdom) John Wyer Automotive Engineering	18	Porsche 4.9 L Flat 12	S 5.0	(United Kingdom) Jackie Oliver	**1°**	14h	Retire (Oil leak)

== Sources ==
- Jalife-Villalón, Carlos Eduardo. The Brothers Rodríguez. Phoenix: David Bull Publishing, 2009. (Translated and enlarged by the author from the 2006 Mexican edition)
- Kettlewell, Mike. "Rodriguez: The young lions of Mexico", in Ward, Ian, general editor. The World of Automobiles, Volume 16, pp. 1915–17. London: Orbis, 1974.

Sporting positions
Preceded by Dan Gurney; A. J. Foyt	Winner of the 24 Hours of Le Mans; 1968; With: Lucien Bianchi	Succeeded by Jacky Ickx; Jackie Oliver
