= Formula One drivers from Mexico =

List of Formula One drivers who competed as Mexican

- Drivers: 6
- Grands Prix: 426
- Entries: 492
- Starts: 470
- Best season finish: 2nd (2023)
- Wins: 8
- Podiums: 46
- Pole positions: 3
- Fastest laps: 14
- Points: 1732
- First entry: 1961 Italian Grand Prix
- First win: 1967 South African Grand Prix
- Latest win: 2023 Azerbaijan Grand Prix
- Latest entry: 2026 Las Vegas Grand Prix
- 2026 drivers: Sergio Pérez

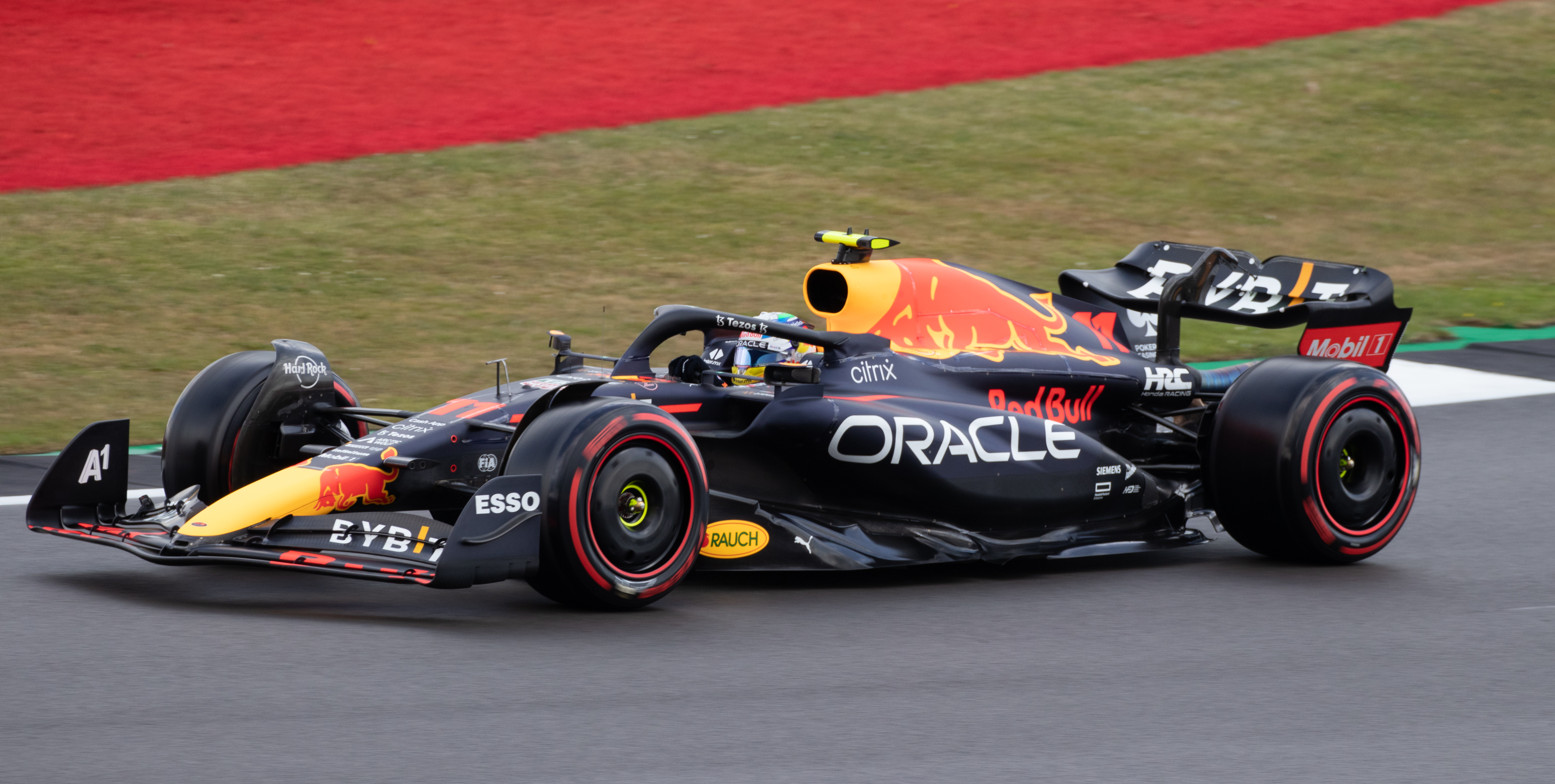
Pérez driving for Red Bull at the 2022 British Grand Prix

There have been six Formula One drivers from Mexico who have taken part in races since the championship began in 1950. Sergio Pérez is the most successful, having won six Grands Prix. Pérez took five of those wins from 2021 to 2024, when he drove for the Red Bull team, during this time he achieved his best Championship finish (2nd in 2023). In 2026, he is driving for Cadillac, where he is contracted to stay for 2027.

== Race winners and polesitters ==
Pedro Rodríguez and Sergio Pérez are the only Mexican drivers to have won an F1 race, with two wins for Rodríguez and six wins for Pérez.

Pérez is the only Mexican F1 driver to achieve a pole position. He took his first pole position at the 2022 Saudi Arabian Grand Prix, in his 219th Grand Prix meeting (a record for the most Grands Prix before a pole). He took his second pole position at the same track, one year later, at the 2023 Saudi Arabian Grand Prix. His last, to date, and most recent pole position was at the 2023 Miami Grand Prix.

== Current drivers ==
Sergio Pérez began his career in 2011 with Sauber before moving to McLaren in 2013 and then Force India in 2014. Pérez continued to race with Force India, including after the team became Racing Point. He was contracted to continue racing until 2022 at the Racing Point, but was pushed out of the team at the end of 2020 by the incoming Sebastian Vettel. He moved to Red Bull for 2021, and remained there until his departure in 2024. Pérez returned as a full-time driver in 2026 for Cadillac.

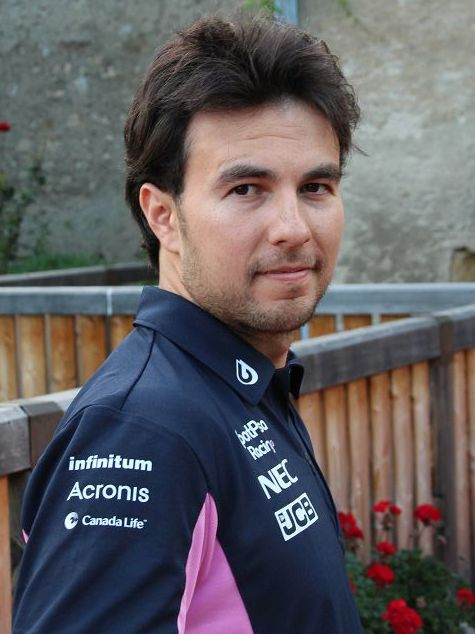
Sergio Pérez
2026 season position: 24th

== Former drivers ==
Brothers Pedro and Ricardo Rodríguez raced in the 1960s. Héctor Rebaque raced in the 1970s. Moisés Solana attended races in the United States and Mexico throughout the 1960s. Esteban Gutiérrez drove for Sauber in 2013 and 2014 and after a one-year gap in which he was a Ferrari test driver, came back to drive for Haas F1 Team in 2016.

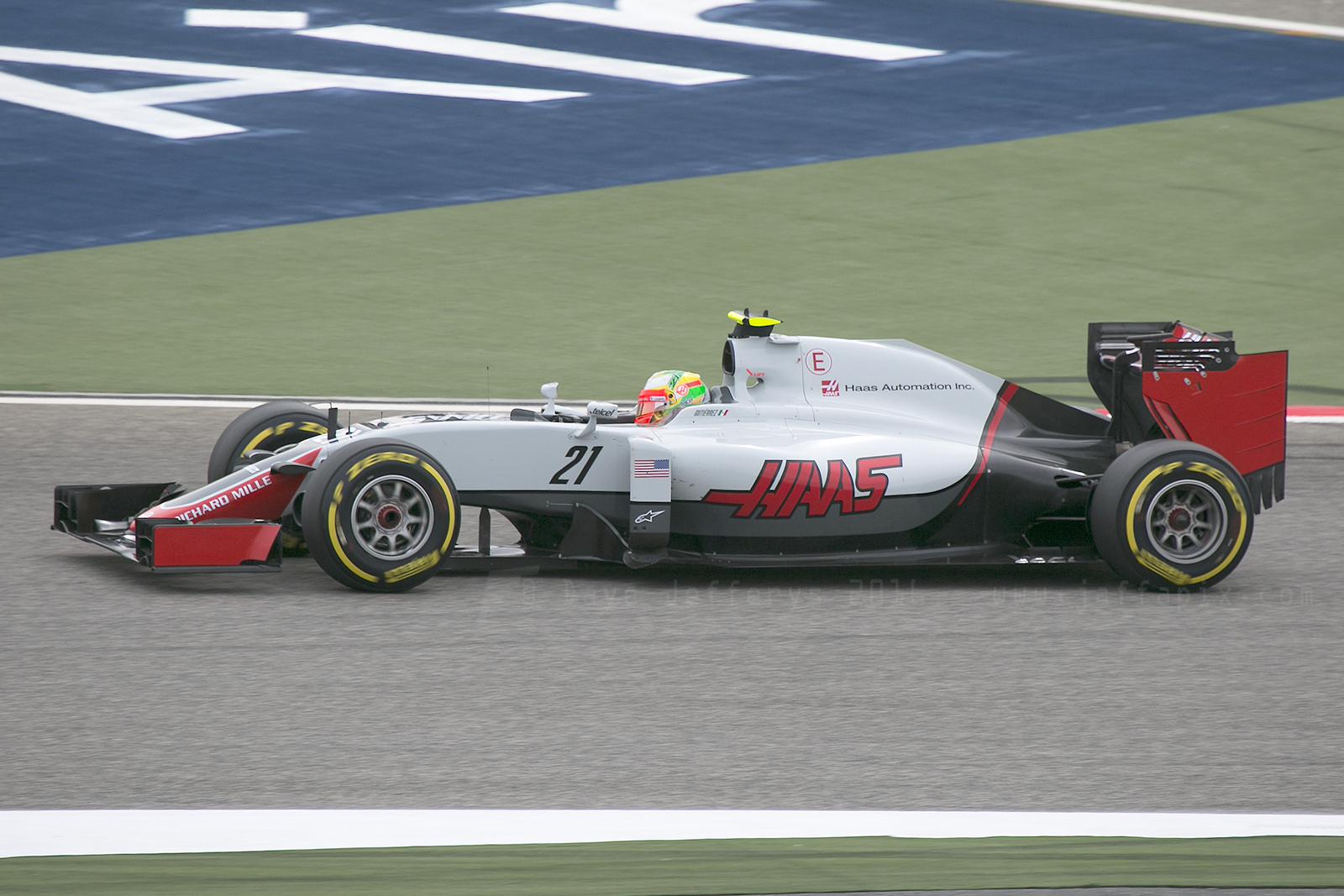
Gutiérrez driving for Haas at the 2016 Bahrain Grand Prix

== Summary ==
Driver	Active Years	Entries	Wins	Podiums	Pole positions	Fastest laps	Career points
Ricardo Rodríguez	1961–1962	6 (5 starts)	0	0	0	0	4
Pedro Rodríguez	1963–1971	55	2	7	0	1	71
Moisés Solana	1963–1968	8	0	0	0	0	0
Héctor Rebaque	1977–1981	58 (41 starts)	0	0	0	0	13
Sergio Pérez	2011–2024, 2026	306 (302 starts)	6	39	3	12	1638
Esteban Gutiérrez	2013–2014, 2016	59	0	0	0	1	6

== See also ==
- List of Formula One Grand Prix winners
- List of Formula One drivers
