= British racing green =

Colour designation originally applied to historic race cars

British Racing Green

Colour coordinates
- Hex triplet: #004225
- sRGB^{B} (r, g, b): (0, 66, 37)
- HSV (h, s, v): (154°, 100%, 26%)
- CIELCh_{uv} (L, C, h): (24, 26, 143°)
- Source: ColorHexa
- ISCC–NBS descriptor: Very dark yellowish green
- B: Normalized to [0–255] (byte)

British Racing Green (BRG) is a colour similar to Brunswick green, hunter green, forest green or moss green (RAL 6005). It takes its name from the green international motor racing colour of the United Kingdom. This originated with the 1903 Gordon Bennett Cup, held in Ireland (then still part of the UK), as motor-racing on public roads was illegal in Great Britain. As a mark of respect, the British cars were painted shamrock green.

There is no exact hue for BRG; the term is used to denote a spectrum of deep, rich greens. In motorsport, the term meant only the colour green in general; its application to a specific shade has developed outside the sport.

== Origins of the association ==
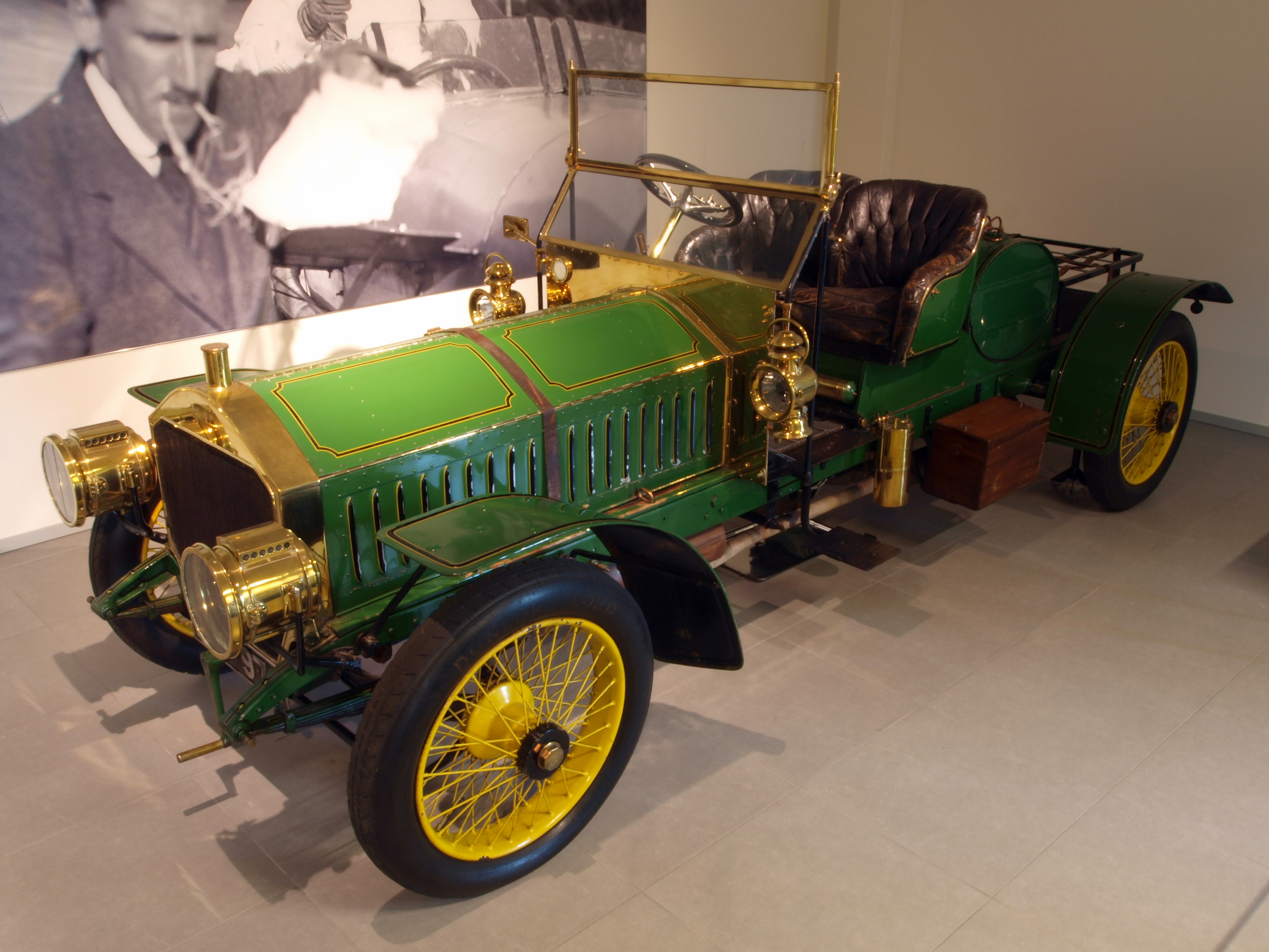
A 1907 Napier 60hp T21, one of the earliest and lighter examples of British racing green

In the days of the Gordon Bennett Cup, Count Eliot Zborowski, father of inter-war racing legend Louis Zborowski, suggested that each national entrant be allotted a different colour. Every component of a car had to be produced in the competing country, as well as the driver being of that nationality. The races were hosted in the country of the previous year's winner. When Britain first competed in the 1902 race, the national flag colours of red, white and blue were unavailable, because those had been taken for the 1900 race by the United States, Germany, and France respectively. Selwyn Edge competed in his green Napier. When he won, it was decided that the 1903 race would be held in Ireland, as motor racing on public roads was at the time illegal in Great Britain. As a mark of respect for their Irish hosts the English Napier cars were painted shamrock green.

In keeping with these Irish/Napier roots, many of the earliest greens used on British racing cars were of a lighter olive, moss or emerald green. Later, darker shades became more common, though there was a return to lighter greens by HWM and other teams in the 1950s. Initially the colour use only applied to the grandes épreuves, but was later codified in the Code Sportif International (CSI) of the Fédération Internationale de l'Automobile (FIA) for use in all international-level motor racing events.

== International rise to prominence ==
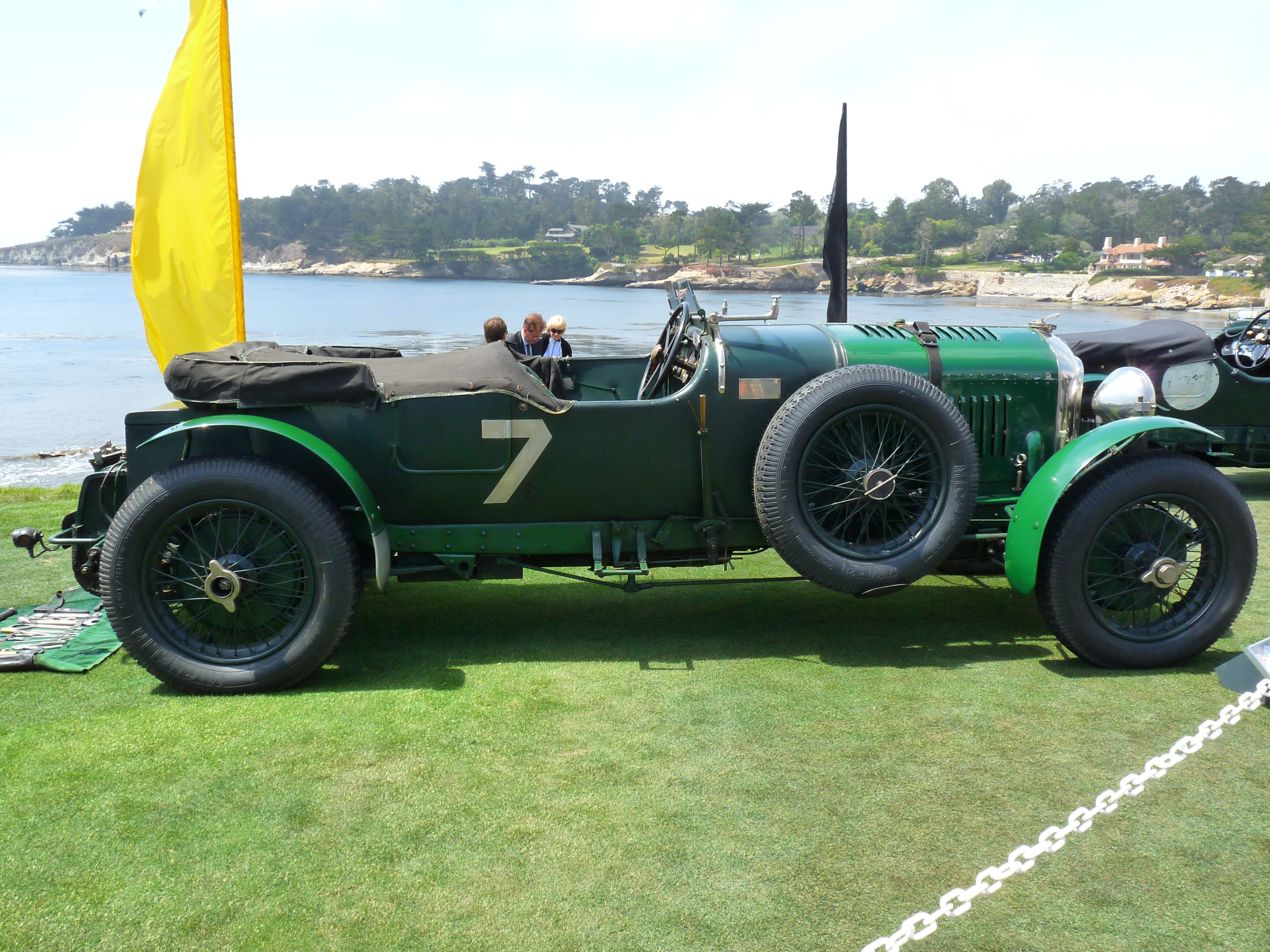
1928 Bentley 4½ Litre. The lighter colour is painted metalwork, the darker a fabric body

The foremost British participant in international motor Racing at the highest echelons both before and after World War I was Sunbeam (from 1920 part of STD Motors). Green liveried Sunbeam racing cars won the 1912 Coupe de l'Auto as well as being the first (and last for several decades) British team to win the European Grand Épreuves Grand Prix in both 1923 and 1924. The green Sunbeams driven by the likes of Henry Segrave and K.L Guinness were during prominent competitions.

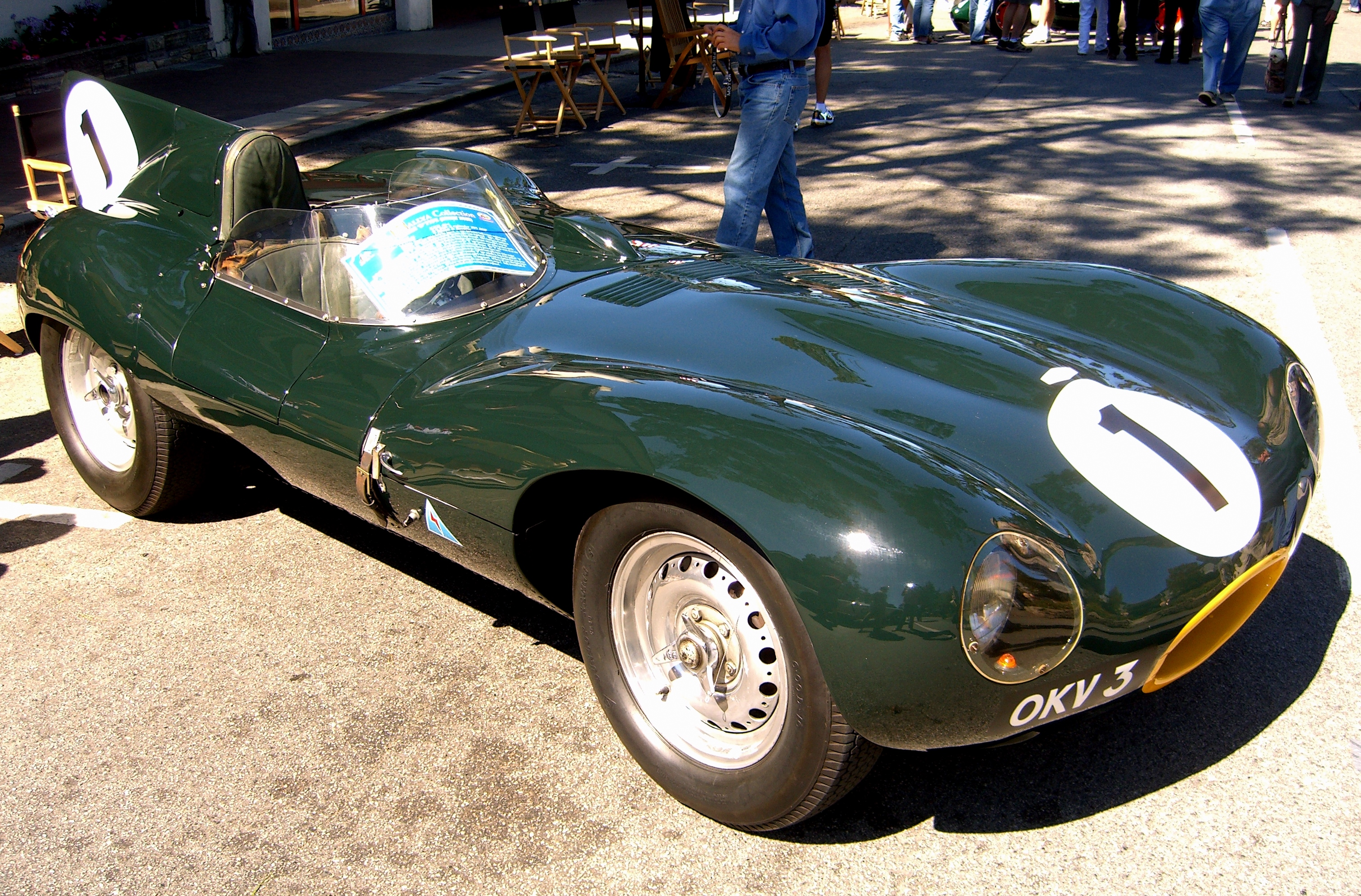
1954 Jaguar D-type in BRG

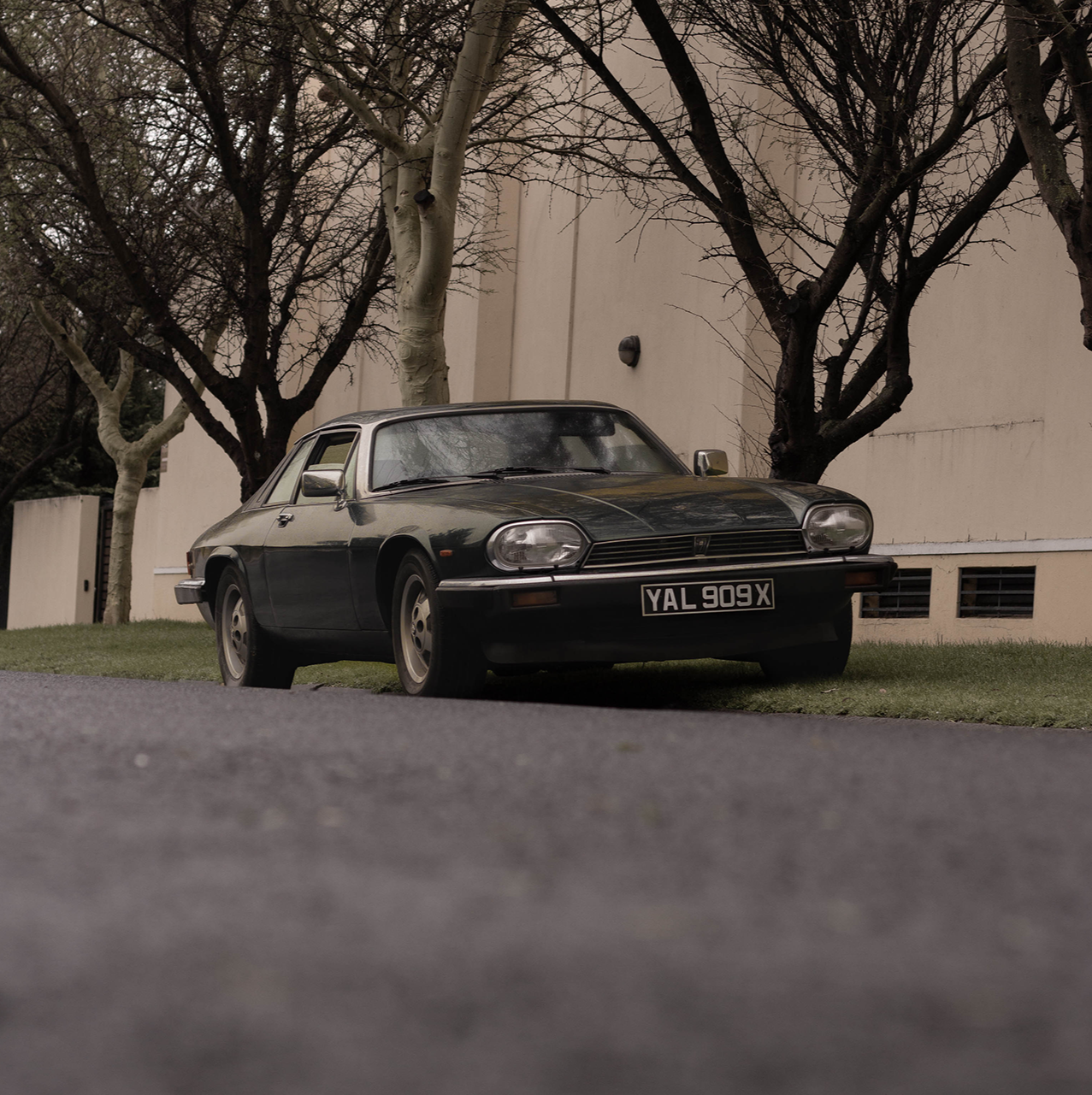
1982 Jaguar XJS, Sir Michael Edwardes, CEO of British Leyland

In the 1920s Bentley cars were very successful at the Le Mans 24-hour races, all sporting a mid- to dark-green. The first recorded use of the darkest green shades was on the Bugatti of Briton William Grover-Williams, driving in the very first Monaco Grand Prix in 1929. This colour has become known as British Racing Green.

In the 1950s and 1960s British teams such as Aston Martin, Vanwall, Cooper, Lotus, and BRM were successful in Formula One and sports car racing, all in different shades of green. The British Racing Partnership team used a very pale green. Scottish teams such as Ecurie Ecosse and Rob Walker Racing used a dark blue, which did not strictly conform to the CSI rules but was tolerated by officials. The Australian-owned but British-based and licensed Brabham team also used a shade of BRG, and this was augmented with a gold (later yellow) stripe, gold and green being the national sporting colours of Australia. Another British-based and licensed team, McLaren, made their debut at the 1966 Monaco Grand Prix with the McLaren M2B car painted white with a green stripe, to represent a fictional Yamura team in the John Frankenheimer´s film Grand Prix.

Since a country is represented in the motorsport through a team and not through a constructor, British privateer teams entering cars built by constructors from another country before the 1968 season painted cars in the British racing green. Stirling Moss drove three races during the 1954 season in a British racing green Maserati 250F because the Italian-built car was entered by the British privateer teams Equipe Moss and A. E. Moss respectively.

Under pressure from a number of teams, most famously the Team Lotus who wished to use the Gold Leaf livery on the Lotus 49 car, in the 1968 season the sponsorship regulations were relaxed in Formula One. Subsequently, Lotus made their debut in this new livery at the 1968 Spanish Grand Prix, becoming the first works team (second only to Team Gunston entering a private Brabham car at the 1968 South African Grand Prix) to paint their cars in the livery of their sponsors.

In the 1970 season the FIA formally gave Formula One an exemption from the national colours ruling and the previously common green colour soon disappeared, being replaced by various sponsor liveries. This exemption has since been extended to all race series, unless specific regulations require the adoption of national colours.

== Modern usage ==
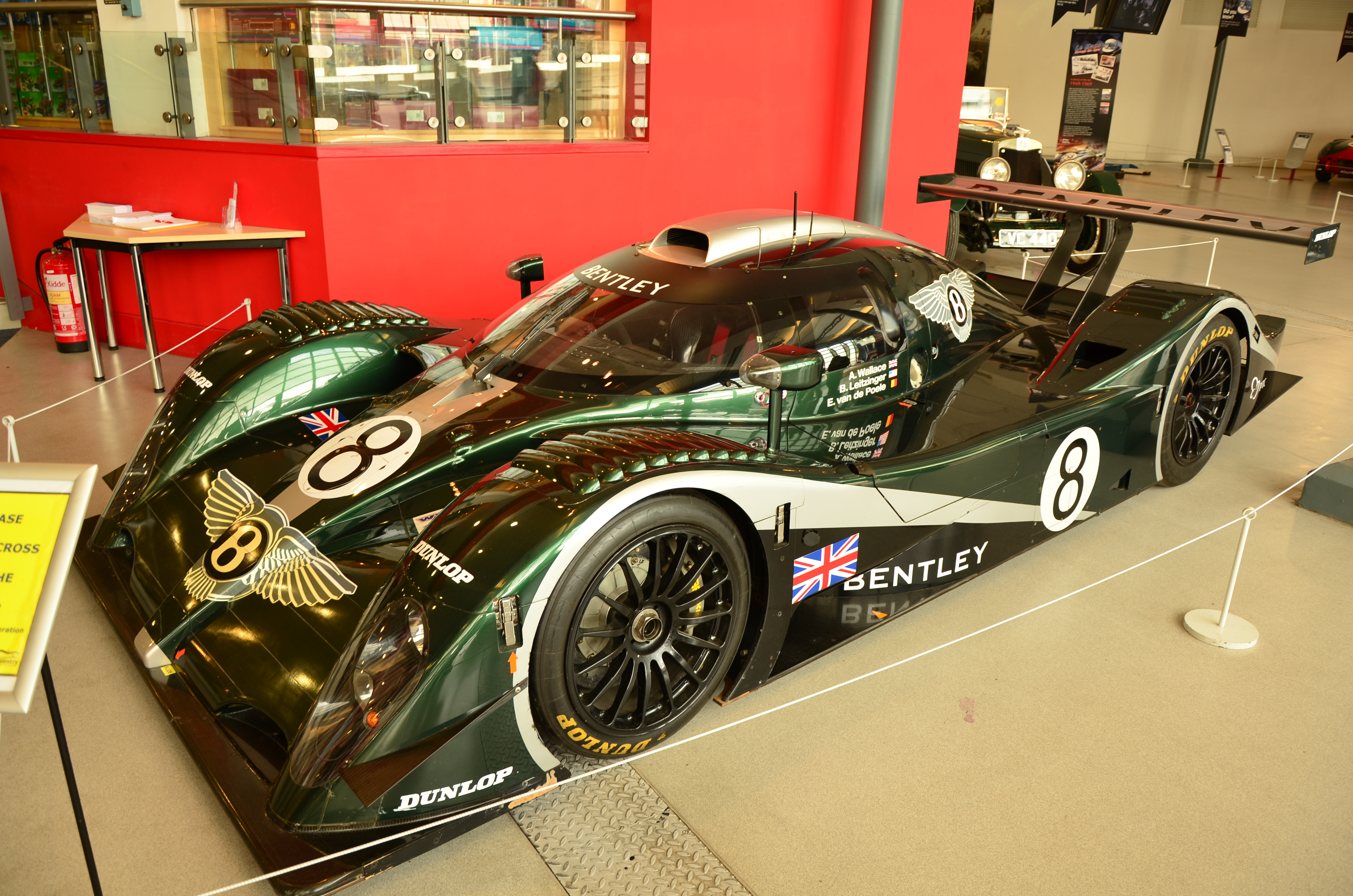
Bentley Speed 8, painted in a darker shade of BRG

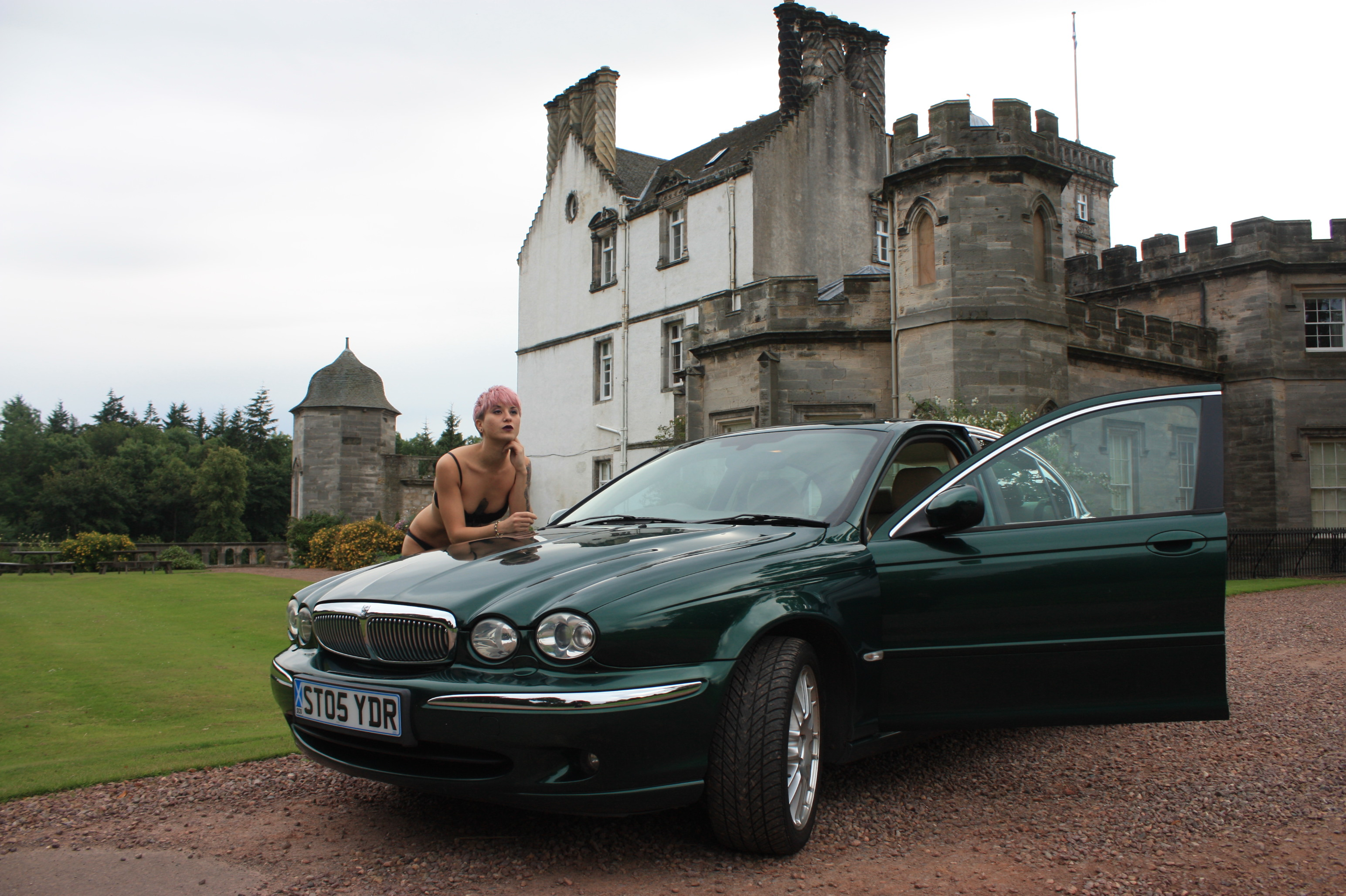
Jaguar X-Type in metallic British racing green

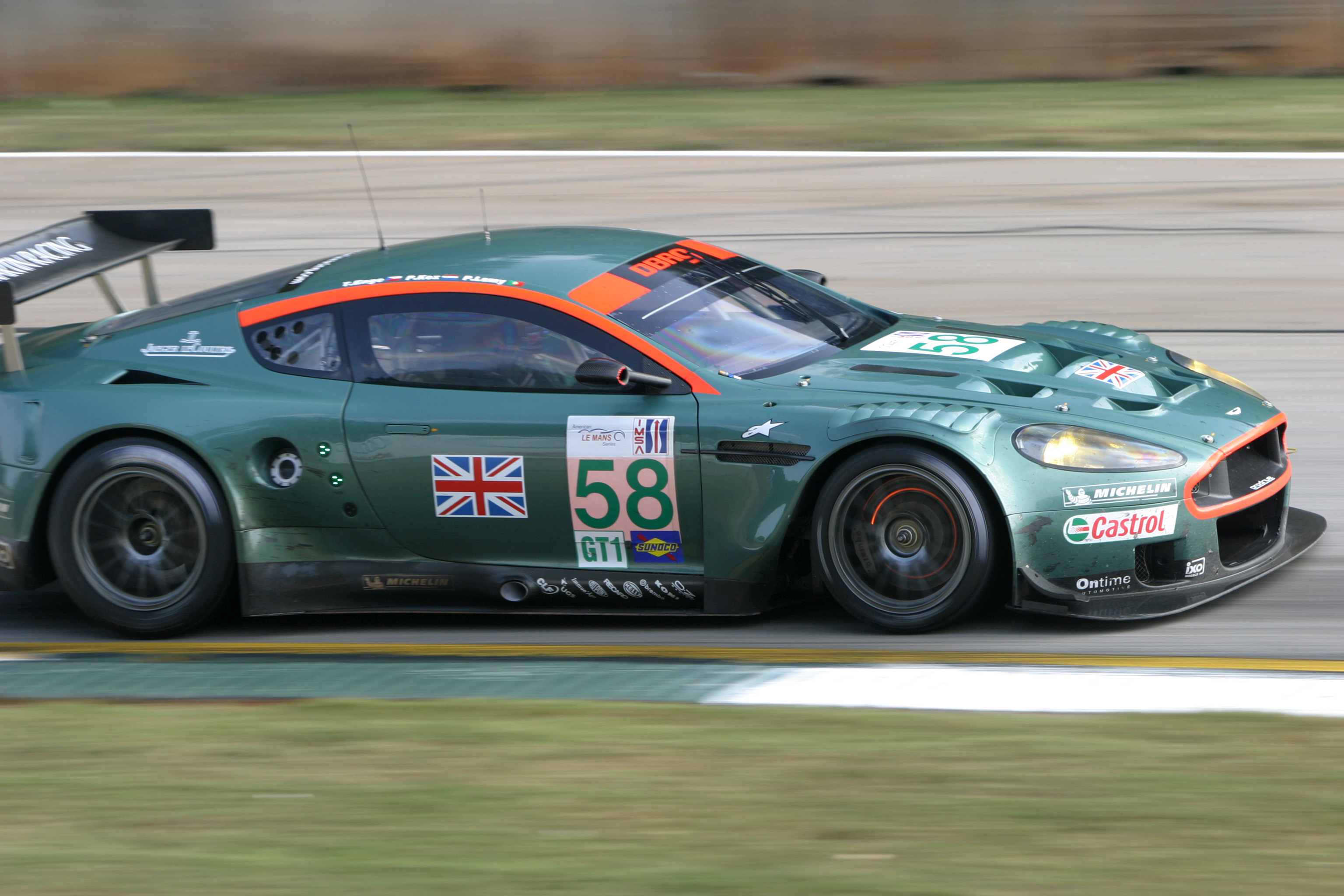
An Aston Martin DBR9, showing a modern metallic interpretation of a lighter shade of British racing green

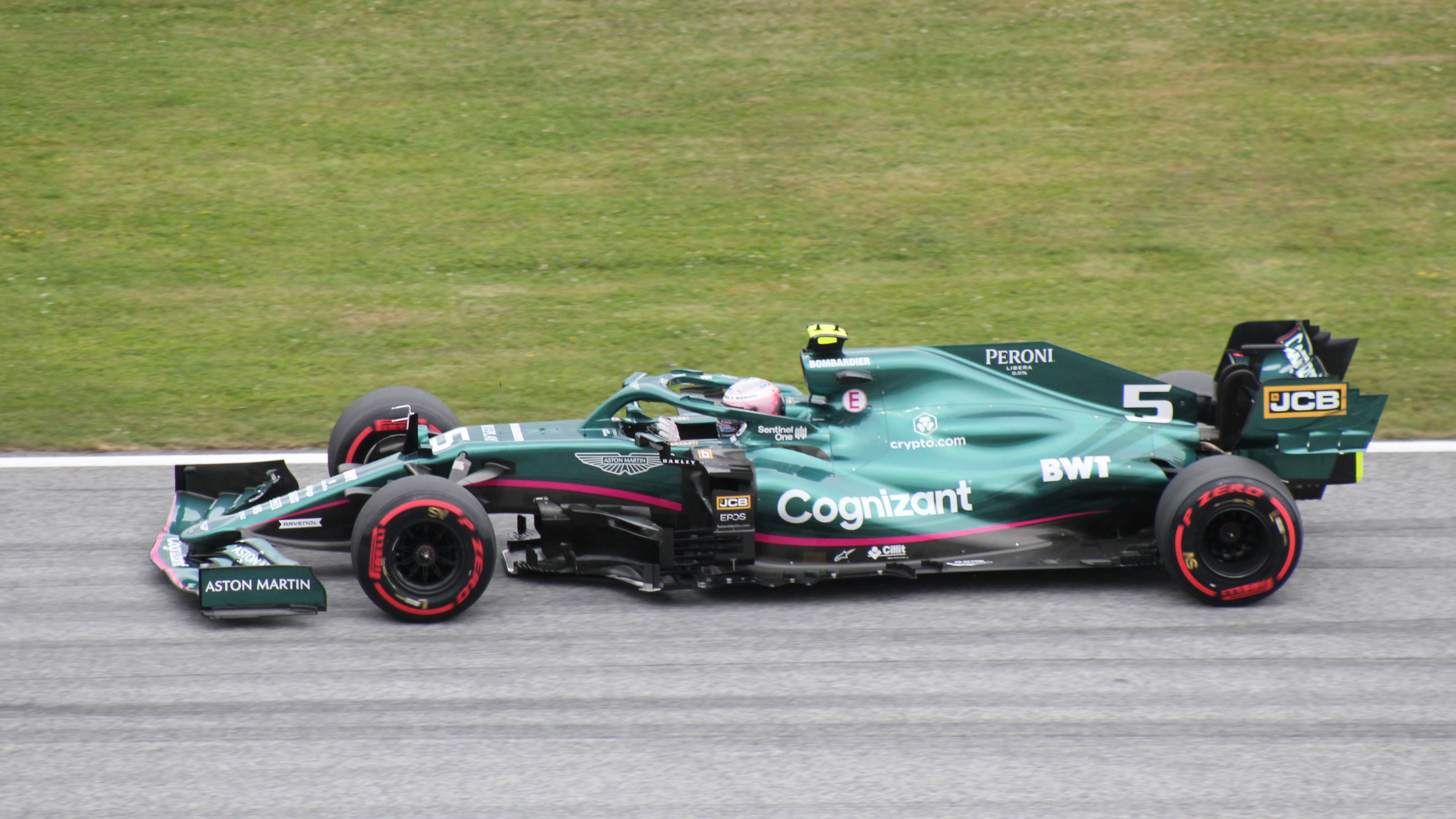
Sebastian Vettel driving the Aston Martin AMR21 during the 2021 Austrian Grand Prix

The history of the famous greens was revived in 2000 season by Jaguar Racing in Formula One, but after this team was sold to Red Bull by Ford in 2004, the new Red Bull Racing team used their own colours. Other traditionally British manufacturers have since followed. Bentley returned briefly to the Le Mans circuit in 2001, 2002 and 2003, winning with the Bentley Speed 8, painted in a very dark shade of BRG. In recent years Aston Martin has also returned to endurance racing, with their DBR9s painted in, a typically Aston, light BRG. Rocketsports Racing also used green for its Jaguar XK in the 24 Hours of Le Mans and American Le Mans Series and other.

In 2010 season, the Lotus name returned to Formula One after a gap of 16 years with the Lotus Racing team's Lotus T127 car liveried in dark green with yellow. Although registered in Malaysia, the new team is based in Britain and chose BRG with the aim of "striking an emotional chord with young and old alike and evoking memories of some of motor racing most iconic moments".

With the many successes of British racing teams through the years, British Racing Green became a popular paint choice for British sports and luxury cars. Originally a solid colour, British Racing Green is increasingly a metallic paint due to the limited range of solids offered by today's manufacturers.

Paying tribute to the small British roadsters of the 1960s that inspired the Mazda MX-5 (such as the Triumph Spitfire, Austin-Healey Sprite, MG MGB and the Lotus Elan), Mazda produced a limited-edition version of the model in 1991 and 2001 called the "British Racing Edition", which included green paint. Similarly, the modern BMW-owned Mini Hatchback marque, which is assembled at their Oxford, Birmingham and Swindon factories, includes a BRG colour option. Originally a somewhat murky dark olive, this was updated to a fresher shade of metallic green in the 2011 version.

In 2020, Lawrence Stroll, owner and founder of the Racing Point F1 Team, purchased a stake in Aston Martin and by next season Racing Point would be rebranded into AMR GP F1 team. For the 2021 season, the team used the iconic British racing green as their livery for the AMR21, as Aston Martin returned after being away from the sport as a constructor for 61 years. This livery is still in use as of 2026, being most recently used on the Aston Martin AMR26.

== Historic paint mixing formulas ==
Imperial Chemical Industries, Belco Car Finishes, Colour Mixing Book 1953, as used on Jowett Cars 1948-1953

- British Racing Green, Code 284-8120: Light Brunswick Green 71%, Middle Brunswick Green 19%, White 7%, Black 3%.
- Connaught Green, Code 284 - 97: Deep Brunswick Green 40%, Light Brunswick green 32%, Black 28%, Yellow Oxide Trace%.

== See also ==
- List of international auto racing colours
- National colours of the United Kingdom
