= National colours of the United Kingdom =

The roundel of the Royal Air Force incorporates the British national colours

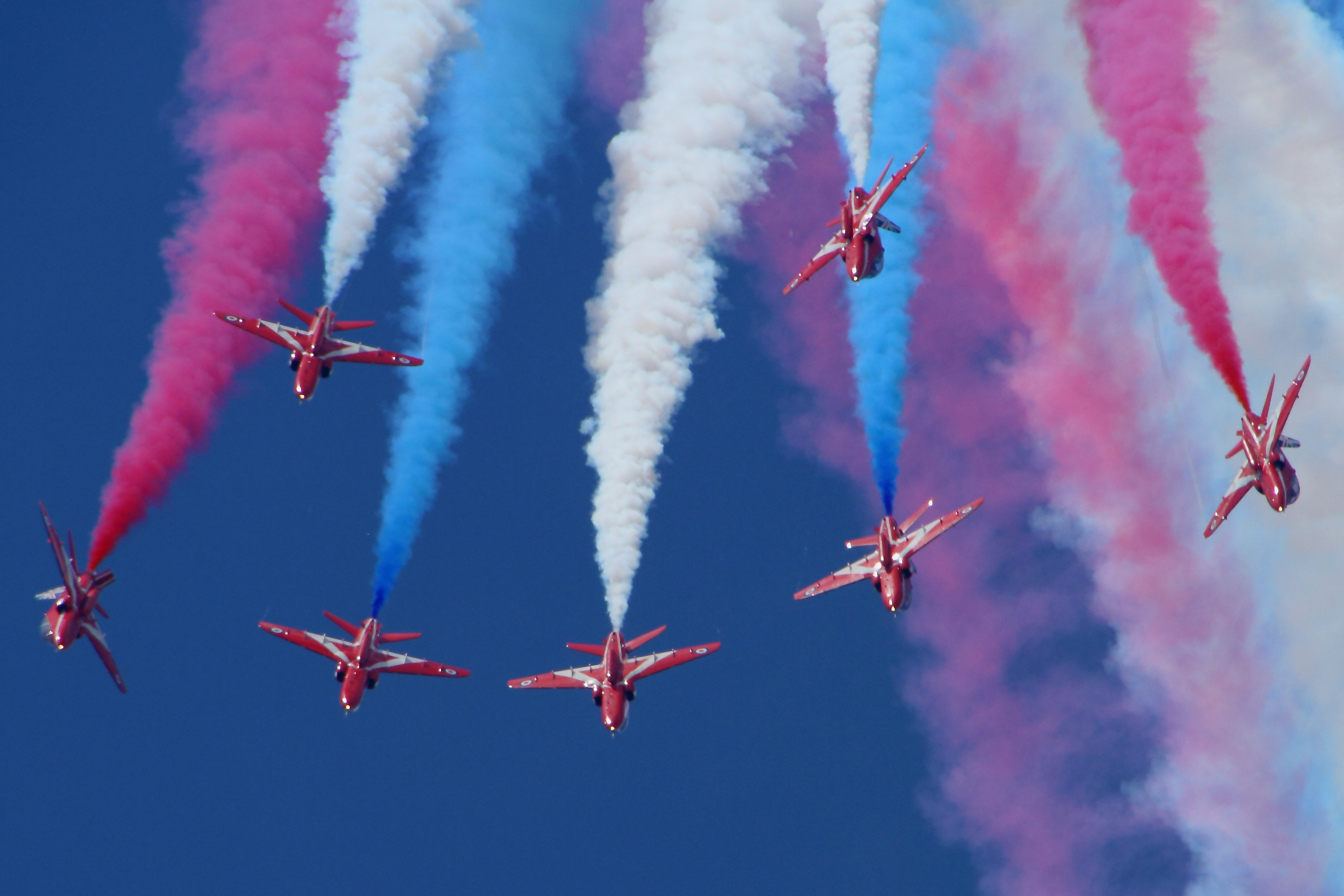
Red Arrows with red, white and blue smoke

The national colours of the United Kingdom are usually identified as the combination of red, white and blue in that order. These colours are the same as in the flag of the United Kingdom. The colours of the flag are in turn taken from the flags of England (white and red) and of Scotland (blue and white), which have been combined to form the union flag; to this was later added a red saltire for Ireland.

== History ==
In maps of the 19th and 20th centuries, the territories of the British Empire were usually coloured red or pink. Historically, the British Armed Forces fought in red, a traditional colour that remains in use in formal and ceremonial uniforms. Militarily, and in other contexts, the single chief colour associated with the UK is therefore red, such as in the famous British Army red coats.

== Usage ==
=== Sport ===
In many international team sports the different countries of the United Kingdom are represented by separate teams. In those where the United Kingdom competes as one team, either under its own name or that of Great Britain (such as in the Olympic Games), colours used for the team are red, white and blue, where the blue is often a very dark blue. The British and Irish Lions play in Red shirts, white shorts and blue socks with green trim.

In motor racing, the national colour of the United Kingdom is green; this is known as British racing green and its somewhat uncertain origin purports that it stems from the Gordon Bennett Cup of 1903. Britain was hosting the race in Ireland and adopted the shamrock green in honour; the colour has been retained ever since, and featured in several Commonwealth racing colours too.

=== Transport ===
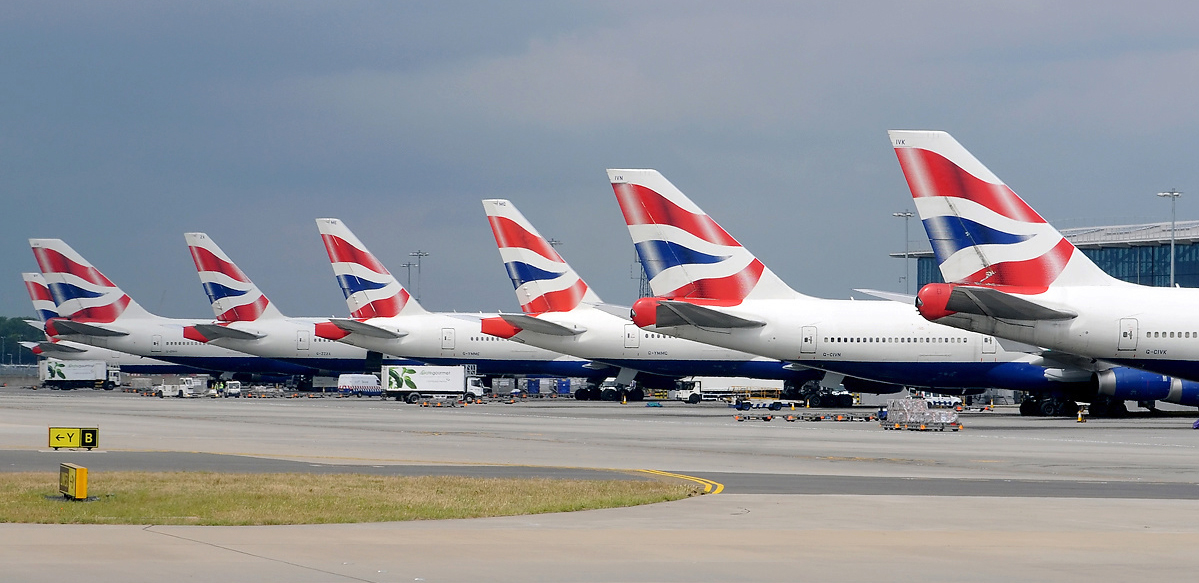
The colours on British airways parked at London Heathrow Airport

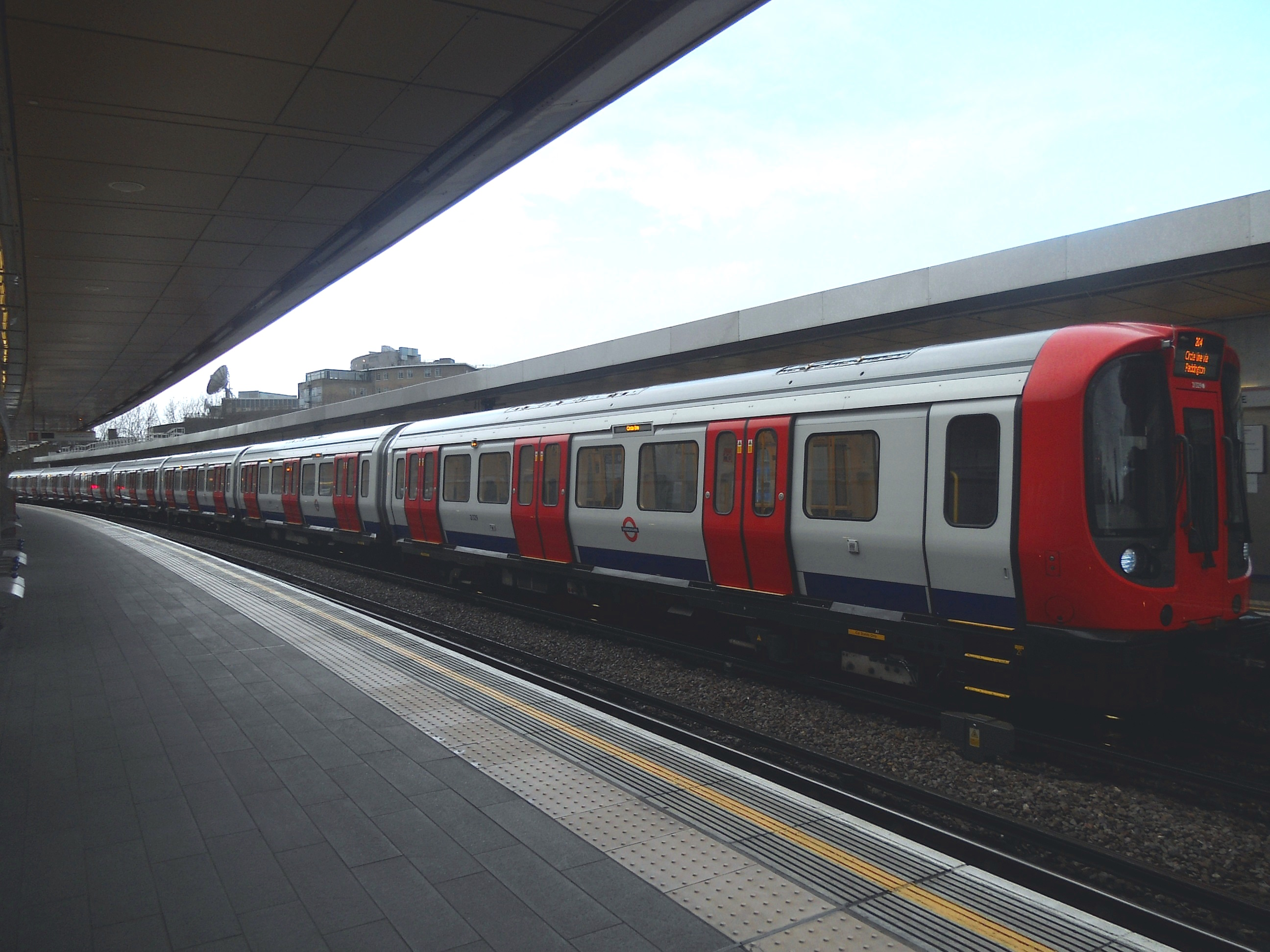
Red, white and blue tube train in London

Red, white and blue are also the colours of the London Underground, the rapid transit system of the United Kingdom's capital. Since the 1990s, the underground trains have been painted in red, white and blue.

=== Orders and decorations ===
British orders and medals whose ribbons are in the national colours include the Royal Victorian Order, the Royal Victorian Medal, the Queen's Gallantry Medal, and all the commemorative Coronation and Jubilee Medals since 1936.

=== At sea ===
At sea, 'national colours' refer to a distinctive flag used to demonstrate a vessel's country of origin. In 1867, an Order in Council defined that "the Red Ensign and Union Jack with a White Border continuing as at present the national colours for all British Ships. The white bordered Union Jack is now commonly known as the Pilot Jack.

== See also ==
- British ensigns
- Flags of the United Kingdom
