= Racing colors =

Racing colors or racing colours may refer to:

- Motor-racing colours, formerly used to indicate a driver or car's country of origin
- Horse-racing colours, worn by jockeys to indicate the horse's owner
