= McLaren M2B =

1966 Formula One racing car by McLaren

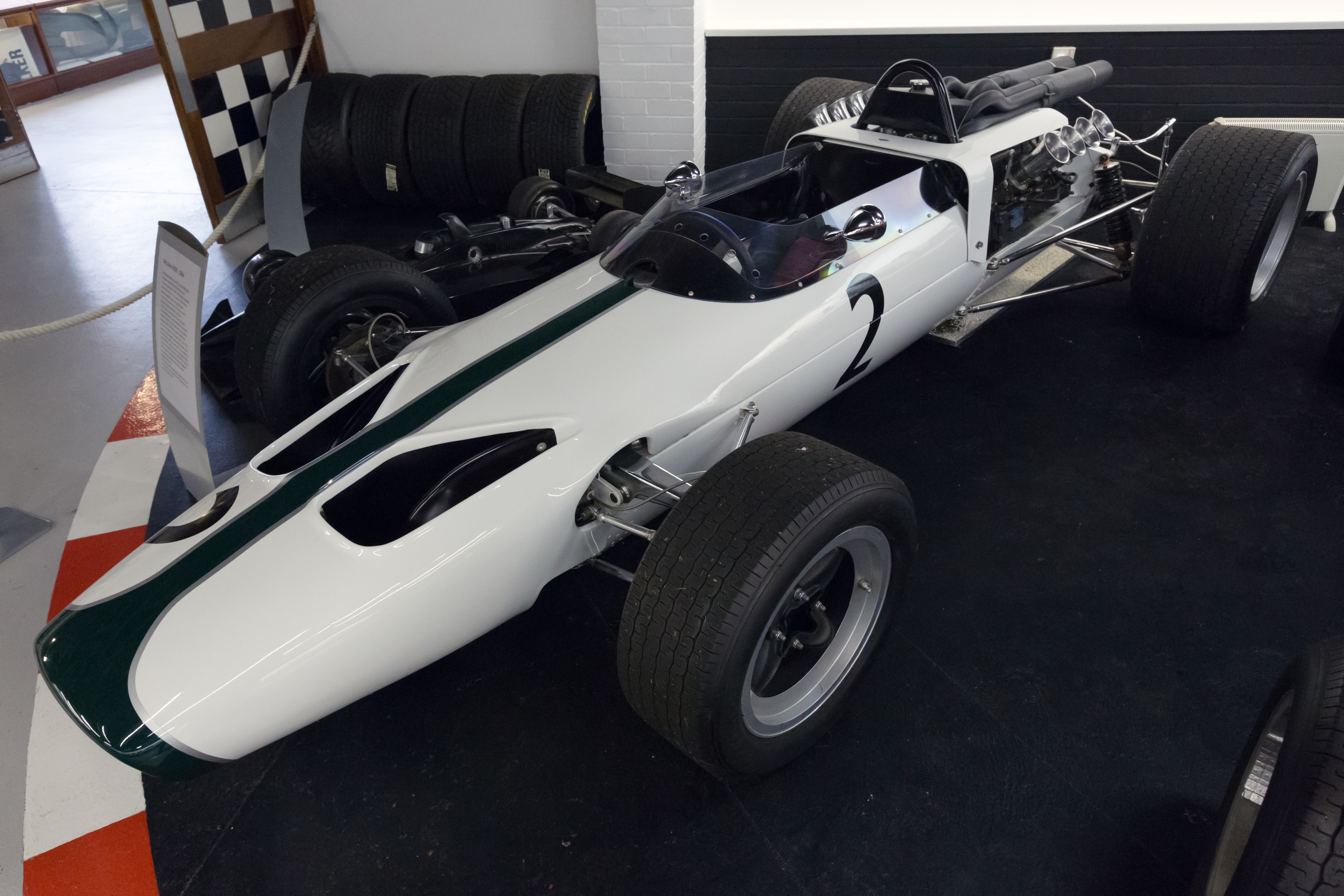
- The M2B on display at the Donington Grand Prix Collection
- Category: Formula One
- Constructor: Bruce McLaren Motor Racing
- Designer: Robin Herd
- Successor: M4B

Technical specifications
- Chassis: Mallite-aluminium alloy monocoque, with steel bulkheads
- Suspension (front): Upper radius arm and lower wishbone, with rocker-arm operated, inboard coilover spring/dampers
- Suspension (rear): Upper transverse link and radius arm with reversed lower wishbone. Outboard coilover spring/dampers
- Engine: Ford 406 3.0 litre V8, Naturally aspirated, mid-mounted Serenissima M166 3.0 litre V8, Naturally aspirated, mid-mounted Mid-engine, rear-wheel-drive
- Transmission: ZF 4- and 5-speed manual transaxle
- Power: 300–315 hp (224–235 kW) @ 9,600 rpm 221 lb⋅ft (300 N⋅m) torque
- Weight: 535 kg (1,179 lb)
- Tyres: Firestone

Competition history
- Notable entrants: Bruce McLaren Motor Racing
- Notable drivers: (New Zealand) Bruce McLaren
- Debut: 1966 Monaco Grand Prix
- Last event: 1966 Mexican Grand Prix
Races	Wins	Poles	F/Laps
6	0	0	0
- Constructors' Championships: 0
- Drivers' Championships: 0

The McLaren M2B was the McLaren team's first Formula One racing car, used during the 1966 season. It was conceived in 1965 and preceded by the M2A development car. Designed by Robin Herd, the innovative but problematic Mallite material was used in its construction. The car was powered by Ford and Serenissima engines but both lacked power and suffered from reliability issues.

Driven by team founder Bruce McLaren, the M2B had a short Grand Prix career, entering six races and starting only four. It scored the team's first point at the British Grand Prix and two more points at the United States Grand Prix.

== Background and development ==
Bruce McLaren Motor Racing was founded in 1963; Bruce McLaren was a factory driver for the Cooper motor racing team which competed in Formula One, the highest level of international single-seater competition. For two years the McLaren team had raced in the Tasman Series, a competition for single-seaters that ran during the Formula One world championship off-season, and in various sports car races. Bruce McLaren continued to race in Grands Prix (i.e. Formula One championship races) for Cooper, but by 1965 the team's performances were worsening and so he decided to build his own Formula One car to race the following year. Despite being a skilled engineer himself, McLaren enlisted Robin Herd to design the car. Herd was an aerospace engineer who had previously worked at the National Gas Turbine Establishment (NGTE) where he had been involved with the Concorde project. In September 1965 the M2A development car was completed. Powered by a 4.5 litre Oldsmobile V8 engine, it was used to test Herd's design ideas and Firestone's tyres. With McLaren still employed by Cooper, the McLaren team initially denied that they were building a Formula One competitor, claiming that the M2A was purely a tyre test bed.

At the factory in Colnbrook, construction started on at least two M2B chassis, whilst a third was possibly started but not completed. (Note: Nye (1988) and "The M2B" state, without qualification, that three chassis were started but only two completed whilst Taylor (2009) says that it "seems probable that just the two cars were built" but that the existence of a third chassis is "possible". Young (1995) makes no mention of a third car.) By December 1965 the M2A had completed over 2,000 miles (3,200 km) of testing and two race engines were ready to be installed in the M2B, Bruce McLaren testing the car at Goodwood Circuit. Also that month, the design team was joined by Herd's former NGTE colleague Gordon Coppuck; Coppuck later became chief designer at McLaren. In February 1966 further testing was carried out in California, United States in anticipation of the start of the world championship season in May.

== Design ==
The M2B was a mid-engined rear-wheel drive monocoque design, monocoques having been popularised by Lotus's 25 of 1962. Influenced by his aerospace experience, Herd built the chassis with Mallite, a material that had originally been designed for internal panelling in aircraft. Mallite is a composite of balsa wood bonded between two sheets of aluminium alloy that is much stiffer than ordinary aluminium alloy, a useful characteristic for a racing car. However, the material proved to be difficult to bend into the curved shapes needed and so, whilst the M2A prototype was made entirely of Mallite except for the steel bulkheads, on the M2B it was utilised only for the inner and upper skins, the remainder being aluminium alloy. Mallite was also complicated to repair after crash damage. Its use did mean though that the chassis was the stiffest then built for an open-cockpit car, with torsional rigidity of nearly 10,000 lb⋅ft (13,600 N⋅m) per degree. Glass-reinforced plastic bodywork covered the nose, cockpit and engine. Fuel was stored in rubber bag tanks situated within the moncoque.

Herd's knowledge of aerodynamics and Bruce McLaren's experience with Ford's sports car racing programme combined to spur the team into experimenting with aerodynamic bodywork. The M2A was fitted with a rear wing that produced downforce – downwards pressure on the car and tyres which allows faster cornering – and reduced lap times by three seconds at a test at Zandvoort circuit in November 1965, two and a half years before the Brabham and Ferrari teams eventually debuted wings in a Grand Prix. The team intended to use the wing on the M2B, but the engine problems that occurred prevented this.

The suspension was a conventional wishbone-based arrangement with inboard coilover springs and dampers at the front and outboard coilover springs and dampers at the rear. Braking was provided by Girling discs within 13 inches (330 mm) diameter magnesium alloy wheels. The wheelbase measured exactly 8 feet (2,400 mm), and front and rear track was 4 ft (1,200 mm) and 4 ft 10.75 in (1,492.2 mm), respectively.

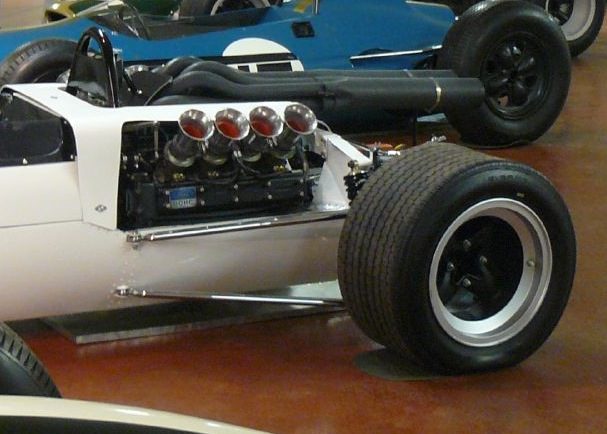
The Ford 406 V8 engine with reduced size compared to the Indy 500 winner proved to be unsuitable for Formula One

For 1966 the Formula One engine capacity limit was doubled to 3.0 litres from the 1.5 litres of the previous five seasons. No team had a suitable engine, not even the F1 teams that built their own engines. McLaren considered and discounted British Racing Motors (BRM) that intended to double their V8 into a H16, Maserati V12, enlarged Coventry Climax and Oldsmobile engines before opting for modifying the Ford Indy V8 engine. This DOHC engine had won the 1965 Indianapolis 500, the premier single-seater oval track race in the United States, with Team Lotus and Jim Clark.

Reduced by third parties in capacity from 4.2 litres to the 3.0 litre limit it was called Ford 406.

This choice by McLaren was partly motivated by the belief that it might bring financial support from Ford, although this never materialised as Ford in 1965 had decided to support the Cosworth DFV. In addition, with a turbocharged Offenhauser engine ending the three win streak of Ford at Indy in 1968, an even smaller 2.65 litre version of the Ford Indy V8 was made to allow turbocharging.

Ex BMW, Porsche and Daimler-Benz engineer Klaus von Rücker was initially appointed to carry out the conversion of the engine in England. However, progress was slow so the project was transferred to Tra-Co Engineering in California where extensive modifications were made to the internals under the oversight of McLaren's Gary Knutson. In its 4.2 litre form the Ford engine produced 470 bhp and McLaren expected the reduced capacity version to produce about 335 bhp. In fact, it produced 300 bhp in a narrow power band and was further handicapped by its large size and weight; combined with the gearbox it weighed nearly as much as rival team Brabham's entire car. In order to allow time to further develop the Ford, McLaren also used a Serenissima M166 3.0 litre V8 engine for some of the races. This engine produced about 260 bhp and required modifications to be made to the monocoque but was at least relatively light and compact. Four- and five-speed ZF transaxle gearboxes and a Borg & Beck clutch were employed.

The M2B was originally intended to be raced in a New Zealand's traditional racing colour scheme of green, black and silver designed by Michael Turner. However, short on money, the McLaren team made a financial deal with the makers of the film Grand Prix – a drama that included actual race footage – which involved the car being painted white with a green stripe (edged in silver) in order to represent the film's fictional Japanese "Yamura" team.

== Racing history ==
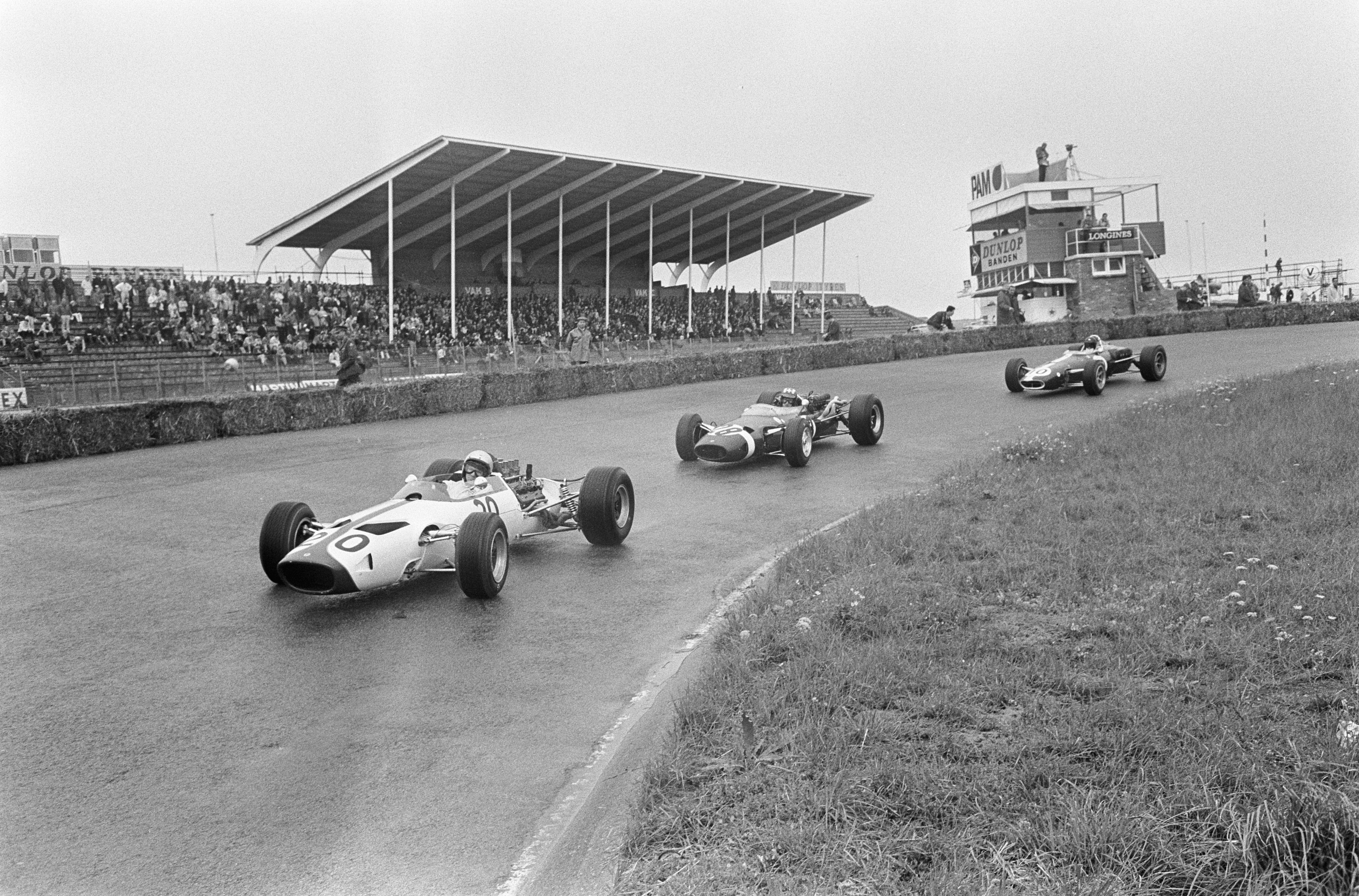
McLaren, driving a Serenissima-engined M2B, leads a train of three cars during practice for the 1966 Dutch Grand Prix

The Ford-powered M2B made its debut driven by McLaren at the world championship season-opening Monaco Grand Prix. There he qualified 10th on the grid and ran as high as sixth but retired after nine laps due to an oil leak. After Monaco McLaren decided "it looks as though we're going to have to make some fairly drastic moves in the engine room", and so for the next race in Belgium the Serenissima engine was used. The replacement unit did not provide an immediate solution though, terminally damaging its bearings in practice. With no spare, McLaren was unable to start the race. The team missed the next race in France, but at the British Grand Prix at Brands Hatch the M2B finished sixth to score McLaren's first championship point. Another non-start resulted when the Serenissima failed again before the Dutch Grand Prix, and the entries for the German and Italian Grands Prix were withdrawn in anticipation of the improved Ford engine being readied. Thus equipped at the United States Grand Prix, McLaren drove to fifth place and two more points. At final event in Mexico, the rear bodywork was cut away to help prevent overheating but the engine failed during the race. McLaren had intended for Chris Amon, who was already racing sports cars for the team, to race a second car but the engine problems prevented this.

=== World Championship results table ===
Year	Team	Engine	Tyres	Drivers	1	2	3	4	5	6	7	8	9	Points (Note: Points were awarded separately for each chassis and engine combination. McLaren-Ford were 9th with 2 points; McLaren-Serenissima were 11th with 1 point.)	WCC
1966	Bruce McLaren Motor Racing	Ford 406 3.0 V8	F		MON	BEL	FRA	GBR	NED	GER	ITA	USA	MEX	2	9th
1966	Bruce McLaren Motor Racing	Ford 406 3.0 V8	F	Chris Amon	DNA	DNA		DNA	DNA		WD			2	9th
1966	Bruce McLaren Motor Racing	Ford 406 3.0 V8	F	Bruce McLaren	Ret							5	Ret	2	9th
1966	Bruce McLaren Motor Racing	Serenissima M166 3.0 V8	F	Bruce McLaren		DNS	DNA	6	DNS					1	11th
Refs															

Key
Colour	Result	Colour	Result
Gold	Winner	White	Did not start (DNS)
Silver	2nd place	Light blue	Practiced only (PO)
Bronze	3rd place	Light blue	Friday test driver (TD) - 2003-2007 only
Green	Points finish	Blank	Did not practice (DNP)
Blue	Non points finish inc. non classified finish	Blank	Injured or ill (inj)
Purple	Did not finish (Ret)	Blank	Excluded (EX)
Red	Did not qualify (DNQ)	Blank	Did not arrive (DNA)
Black	Disqualified (DSQ)	Blank	Withdrew entry before the event (WD)

== Legacy ==
Despite the M2B's lack of success Herd said of the team, "Everyone was ten times more determined to do better the following year." On the design of the car he reflected that, "our emphasis tended to be more on the elegance of the chassis structure rather than on the design of a really quick racing car" and that, "we ... tended to go towards technical ingenuity and bullshit rather than racewinning engineering". Team member and later manager of the organisation Teddy Mayer said, "Our main problems were with the choice of the Ford engine." Bruce McLaren's personal secretary and author Eoin Young concurs. The winners of the 1966 Drivers' and Constructors' championships, Jack Brabham and his eponymous team, used a Repco-developed Repco-Brabham V8 engine based on Oldsmobile cylinder block. It produced approximately 290 bhp – less than the Ford – but its light weight and reliability rendered it effective. Despite having used the Oldsmobile in sports racing cars, the McLaren team discounted it. Afterwards, Mayer said, "We considered it, but the kind of modifications which Repco did were well beyond our resources, and I doubt very much if we could have done any more with it than we did with the Indy Ford."

McLaren's later cars abandoned Mallite in favour of conventional aluminium construction; the Ford and Serenissima engine also saw no further action. For 1967 BRM engines powered the M4B and M5A but it was not until the Cosworth DFV became available in 1968 that McLaren scored their first Formula One wins with the M7A. Herd stayed on designing all of these cars until he left for Cosworth in 1967. McLaren have since become one of the most successful teams in Formula One.

The M2A was sold on to be used by various private racers in the United Kingdom before being destroyed by fire in 1969. Sources suggest that three M2B chassis were similarly sold on; one is awaiting restoration in the United States and another is currently on display at the Donington Grand Prix Exhibition.

For the 2026 British Grand Prix, McLaren collaborated with sponsor Google Gemini to launch a one-off special livery for the MCL40 based on the M2B in homage to the team's beginnings. The team had previously celebrated its 1,000th Grand Prix milestone in the Monaco Grand Prix.
