= Mallite =

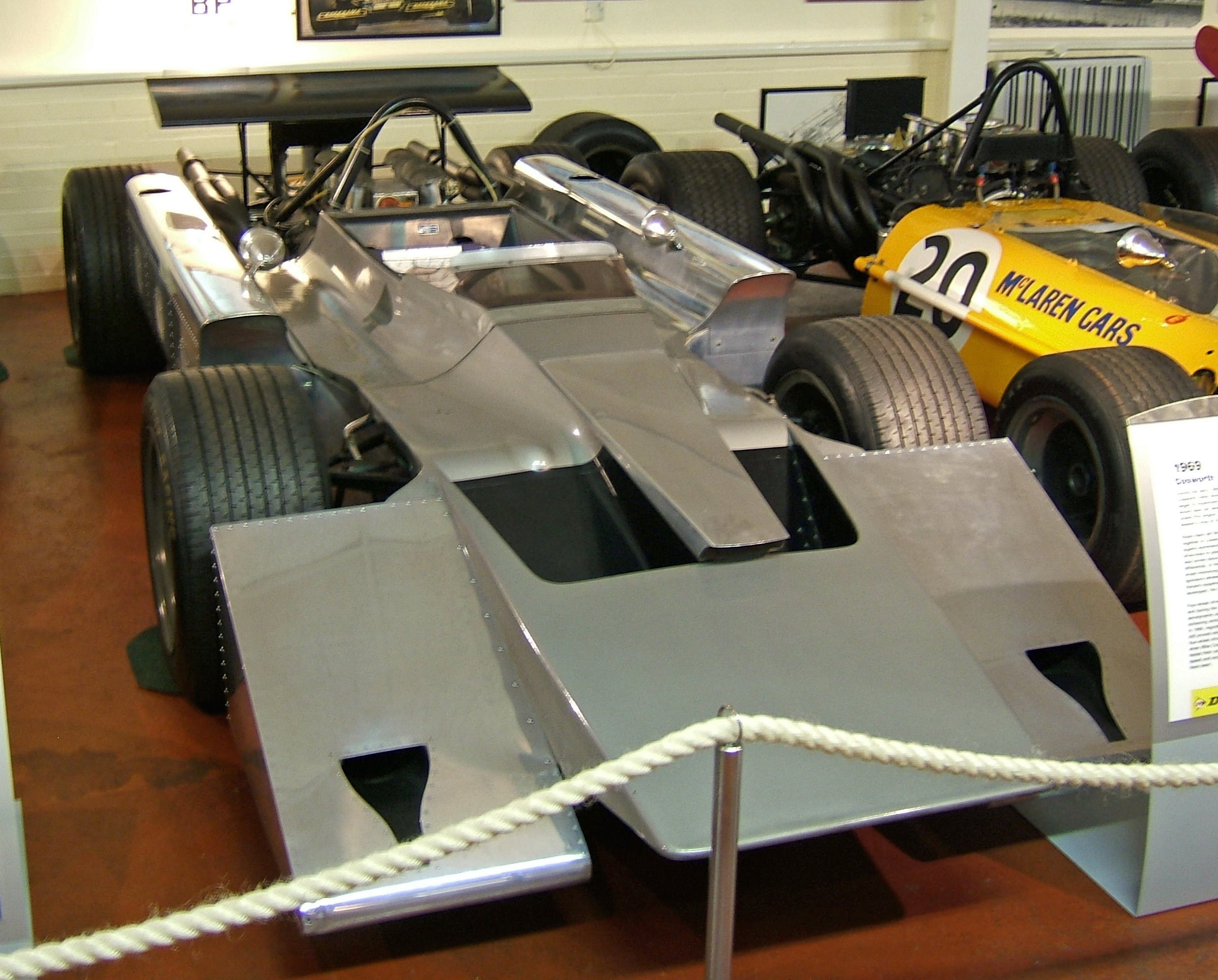
The Mallite-bodied, four-wheel drive, Cosworth Formula One car.

Mallite is a type of laminate composite material, formerly manufactured by the William Mallinson & Sons company. The material is formed of a core sheet of end grain balsa wood, faced by duralumin sheets. This construction endows the finished material with greater strength and rigidity than a light alloy sheet of equal mass. The material was originally developed in the late 1950s for use in the aerospace industry, primarily for use in flooring and internal partitioning in jet airliner construction. However, it found fame as one of the first engineered composite materials to be employed in the motorsport industry. Robin Herd, formerly a designer on the Concorde project, used his aerospace knowledge to design the first McLaren single-seater racing cars. The M2A prototype used Mallite extensively, throughout its construction. The final production model, the Formula One McLaren M2B of 1966, only used Mallite for its internal skins and lower bodywork; a lack of understanding of the material's properties had led the team to design the car with conventional curved bodywork, creating problems during the fabrication process as the inherently inflexible material would not readily conform to complex, compound curvatures. With greater understanding of Mallite's properties Herd later used the material to construct the unraced Cosworth four-wheel drive Formula One car of 1969, noted for its slab-sided, angular looks.
