= Robin Herd =

English engineer, designer, and businessman (1939–2019)

Robert Herd CBE
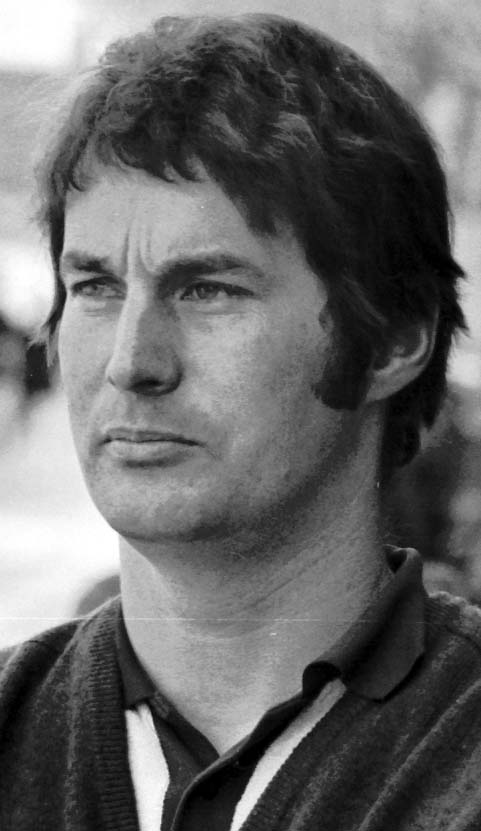
- Herd in 1971
- Born: Robert John Herd; 23 March 1939; Newton-le-Willows, Merseyside, England, United Kingdom
- Died: June 4, 2019 (aged 80); Abingdon-on-Thames, Oxfordshire
- Occupations: Engineer; automotive designer

Robert John "Robin" Herd CBE (23 March 1939 – 4 June 2019) was an English engineer, designer and businessman.

Herd studied at St Peter's College, Oxford, having turned down an offer to play cricket for Worcestershire at the age of 18. He initially entered Oxford with a scholarship to study mathematics, however he switched subjects and graduated with a double first in physics and engineering, before joining the Royal Aircraft Establishment in 1961 as a design engineer on the Concorde supersonic aircraft project, focussing on computational fluid dynamics. He worked on the Concorde project for four years and was eventually promoted to senior scientific officer at the age of 24.

He was recruited by McLaren in 1965, having been alerted to an engineering vacancy with the constructor by former school friend and racing driver Alan Rees, and worked on cars, such as the Mallite-bodied M2A test car for the Firestone tire company. The M2A subsequently evolved into the Formula One M2B car. Herd stayed with McLaren until 1968 — during which time he designed their M4B, M5A and M7 Formula One cars, as well as the successful M6A Can-Am car — before moving to Cosworth to design a four-wheel drive F1 car. He also carried out work for Frank Williams in late 1969, modifying Williams' Brabham BT26 to take a Ford Cosworth DFV to enter Piers Courage in Formula One. He co-founded March Engineering with Max Mosley, Alan Rees and Graham Coaker in 1969. The team completed 207 Formula One Grand Prix races between 1970 and 1992, winning three with four pole positions. In addition they enjoyed a great deal of success in Formula Two, and in the 1980s they made a successful foray into Indy car racing, with March cars winning the Indianapolis 500 for five successive years from 1983 to 1987.

From 1995 to 1998, he served as Chairman of Oxford United F.C., with the team winning promotion to Football League Division One during his first season at the helm.

Herd was appointed a Commander of the Most Excellent Order of the British Empire (CBE) in the 1986 New Year Honours, as managing director of March. He died from cancer in 2019, aged 80.
