= List of international auto racing colours =

From the beginning of organised motor sport events, in the early 1900s, until the late 1960s, before commercial sponsorship liveries came into common use, vehicles competing in Formula One, sports car racing, touring car racing and other international auto racing competitions customarily painted their cars in standardised racing colours that indicated the nation of origin of the car or driver. These were often quite different from the national colours used in other sports or in politics.

== History ==
=== 1900s ===
The colours have their origin in the national teams competing in the Gordon Bennett Cup, which was held annually in 1900–1905. Count Eliot Zborowski, father of inter-war racing legend Louis Zborowski, suggested that each national entrant be allotted a different colour. The first competition in 1900 assigned: Blue to France, Yellow to Belgium, White to Germany and Red to the United States. (Italy did not adopt its famous 'Racing Red' until a red Fiat won the Grand Prix race in 1907).

When Britain first competed in 1902, it had to choose a different colour from her national colours of red, white and blue, as these had already been allocated. Selwyn Edge's winning Napier of 1902 was painted olive green, and green was well-established as an appropriate colour for locomotives and machinery, in which Britain had led the world during the previous century. When Britain hosted the 1903 Gordon Bennett Cup the following year on a closed course at Athy in Ireland, the British adopted Shamrock green which later evolved into various shades of 'British racing green'.

=== 1920s–1960s ===
Colours were definitely established in the Interwar period of Grand Prix motor racing and listed by the AiACr (the forerunner of the FIA), when the Bleu de France Bugattis and the Rosso Corsa Alfa Romeos of Italy won many races, while the British racing green Bentleys dominated the Le Mans Grand Prix d'Endurance until 1930.

In the 1930s the Mercedes-Benz and Auto Union teams did not apply the traditional German white paint, and their bare sheets of metal gave rise to the term Silver Arrows. A myth developed in the 1930s that the German teams did not apply white paint owing to the need to be under the 750 kg maximum weight limit; however, the first "Silver Arrows" raced in 1932, before the weight limit was imposed in 1934. Modern monocoque aircraft fuselage construction was already using polished and unpainted aluminium panels at this period, and the wealthy motor-racing fraternity would also have been aware that in Heraldry, White and Silver are the same colour or 'tincture', described as 'Argent'; (similarly Yellow and Gold are both called 'Or').

Thailand's accepted racing colours of mid blue with a lower yellow band and/or yellow wheels, are said to have been derived from the evening dress worn by a young woman met in London in the early thirties by Prince Bira of Siam, who lived in Europe and was a well-known racer of the time. Bira adopted the scheme for his cars from 1934 until he retired in 1954, by which time he had represented his country in many areas of international motor sport.

Post-war colours were defined in terms of body, bonnet, chassis, numbers and their backgrounds (see diagrams below). When the chassis was no longer exposed, the chassis colour was shown in various ways, e.g. the parallel blue stripes of the Cunningham team and other US teams in the 1950s. Porsche in the 1950s and 1960s also retained the silver colouring, although other German teams in the 1960s (such as BMW) returned to white paint.

During this period, the colour was not determined by the country the car was made in nor by the nationality of the driver(s) but by the nationality of the team entering the vehicle, e.g. Stirling Moss drove three races during the 1954 season in a British racing green Maserati 250F because the Italian-built car was entered by the British privateer teams Equipe Moss and A.E.Moss respectively. However, this general rule was not strictly kept. Australian Jack Brabham and New Zealander Bruce McLaren, for instance, who both based and licensed their teams in Britain, used colour schemes on their early cars that were not based on national principles (namely the Brabham BT3, McLaren M2B, McLaren M4B and McLaren M5A cars), while the British Rob Walker privateer team entered cars in Scottish national colours (blue with a white stripe) instead of the British racing green.

=== Sponsorship era – from 1968 ===
In the spring of 1968, sponsorship liveries, which had already been used in the United States for some years, were also allowed in international racing. Team Gunston, a South African privateer team, was the first Formula One team to paint their cars in the livery of their sponsors when they entered a private Brabham for John Love, painted in the colours of Gunston cigarettes, in the 1968 South African Grand Prix. In the next race, the 1968 Spanish Grand Prix, Team Lotus became the first works team to follow this example, with Graham Hill's Lotus 49B entered in the red, gold and white colours of Imperial Tobacco's Gold Leaf brand. British Racing Green soon vanished from the cars of British teams.

The old colour scheme was abandoned by the FIA for most racing disciplines in the 1970s. The last official record of racing colours the FIA published was in 1977.

=== Contemporary usage ===
Traditional colours are still used by automakers and teams that want to emphasise their racing traditions, especially by Italian, British and German manufacturers.

The Rosso Corsa has been used uninterruptedly by Italian manufacturers Ferrari and Alfa Romeo.

Since the 1990s, other traditional colours have resurfaced, such as the British racing green F1 Jaguar Racing cars and Aston Martin sports cars, and the white F1 BMW Sauber. German manufacturers like Mercedes-Benz and Audi (Auto Union) used silver paint when they returned to international racing in the 1990s. Many concept cars follow the old colour schemes, and most amateur racers prefer them as well.

Often, sponsorship agreements respect traditional colours. For example, Ferrari has had major sponsors which also use red colours, like Marlboro and Santander. In contrast, when tobacco company West sponsored McLaren in the 1990s and 2000s, they did not use their colours, but the "Silver Arrows" from engine provider Mercedes. In a reversed situation, Subaru has continued using blue and yellow liveries well after their 555 sponsorship ended.

Some manufacturers prefer colours different from their national colours. For example, Citroën has traditionally used red, Renault and Opel have used yellow and black, and Volkswagen has used blue and white.

The EFDA Nations Cup, running 1990–1998, was a one make racing series with a total of at least 20 countries, predominantly European ones, being represented.

The annual A1 Grand Prix series of 2005–2009 featured national teams, driving identical cars with differing colour schemes. Initially, most schemes were based on the respective national flags; some teams with different traditional sporting colours have since switched, including A1 Team Australia and A1 Team India. The old national racing colours were not so popular among these teams.

Honda's range of street-legal Type-R vehicles are offered in Championship White (Honda colour code NH0) which is similar to the original white that adorned Honda's first F1 car (Honda RA272) driven by Richie Ginther that secured Honda's first ever F1 win in the 1965 Mexican Grand Prix.

== Historic colours ==
=== Major competitors ===
These have stuck as a pattern, and are common outside of international Grand Prix racing.

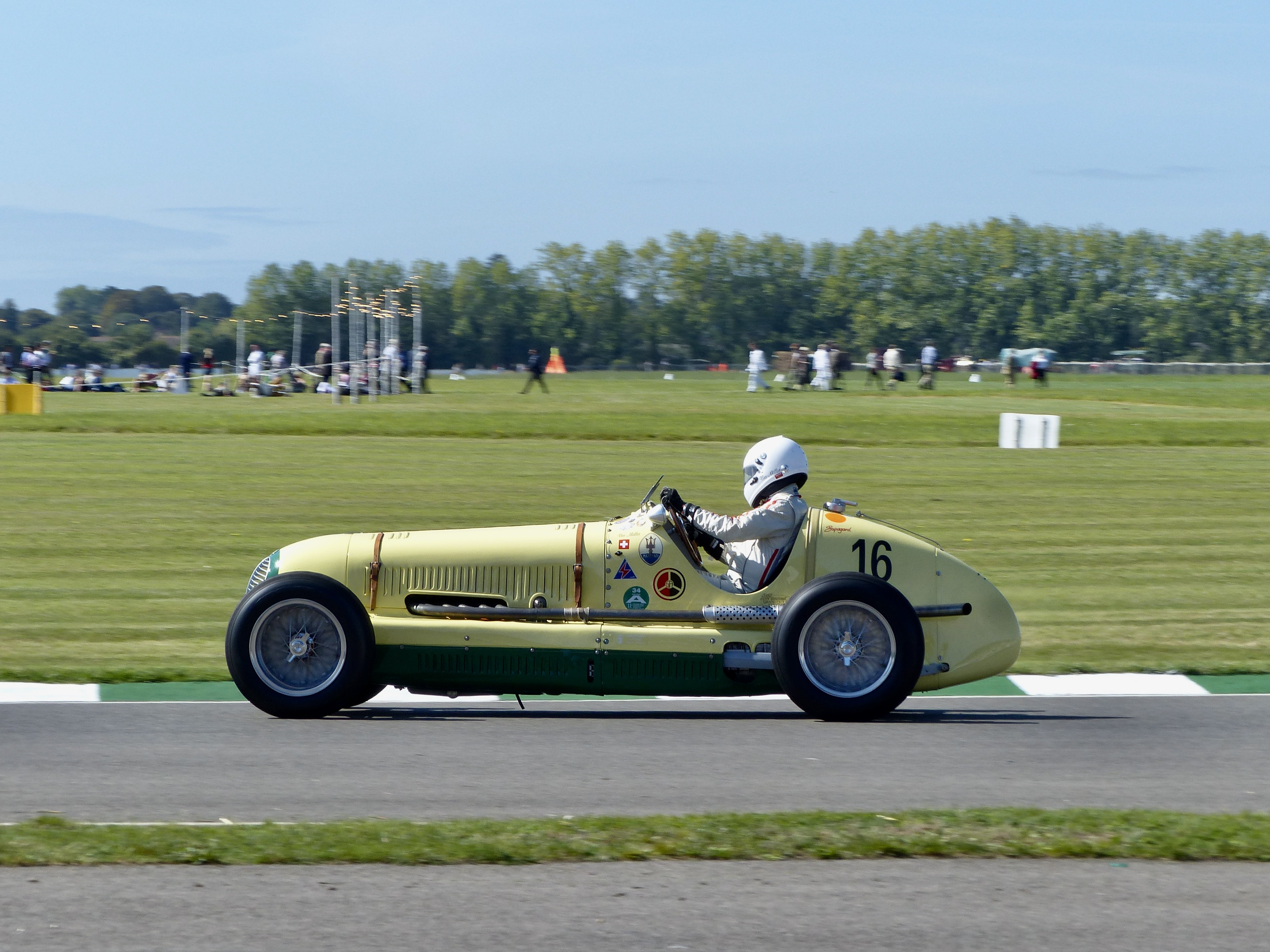
Brazilian Maserati 8CM, driven by Urs Müller, Goodwood Revival 2019

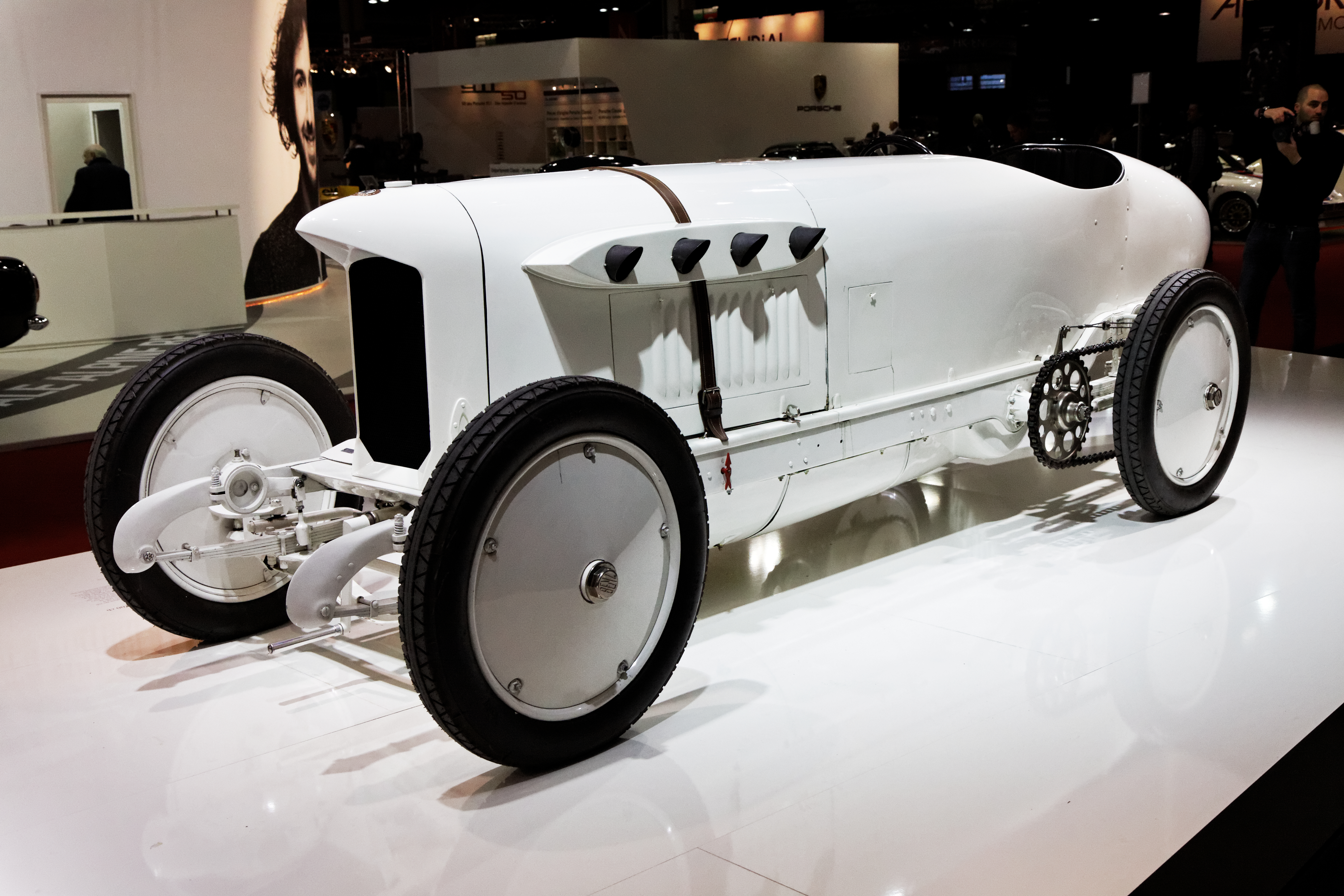
German Blitzen Benz (1909)

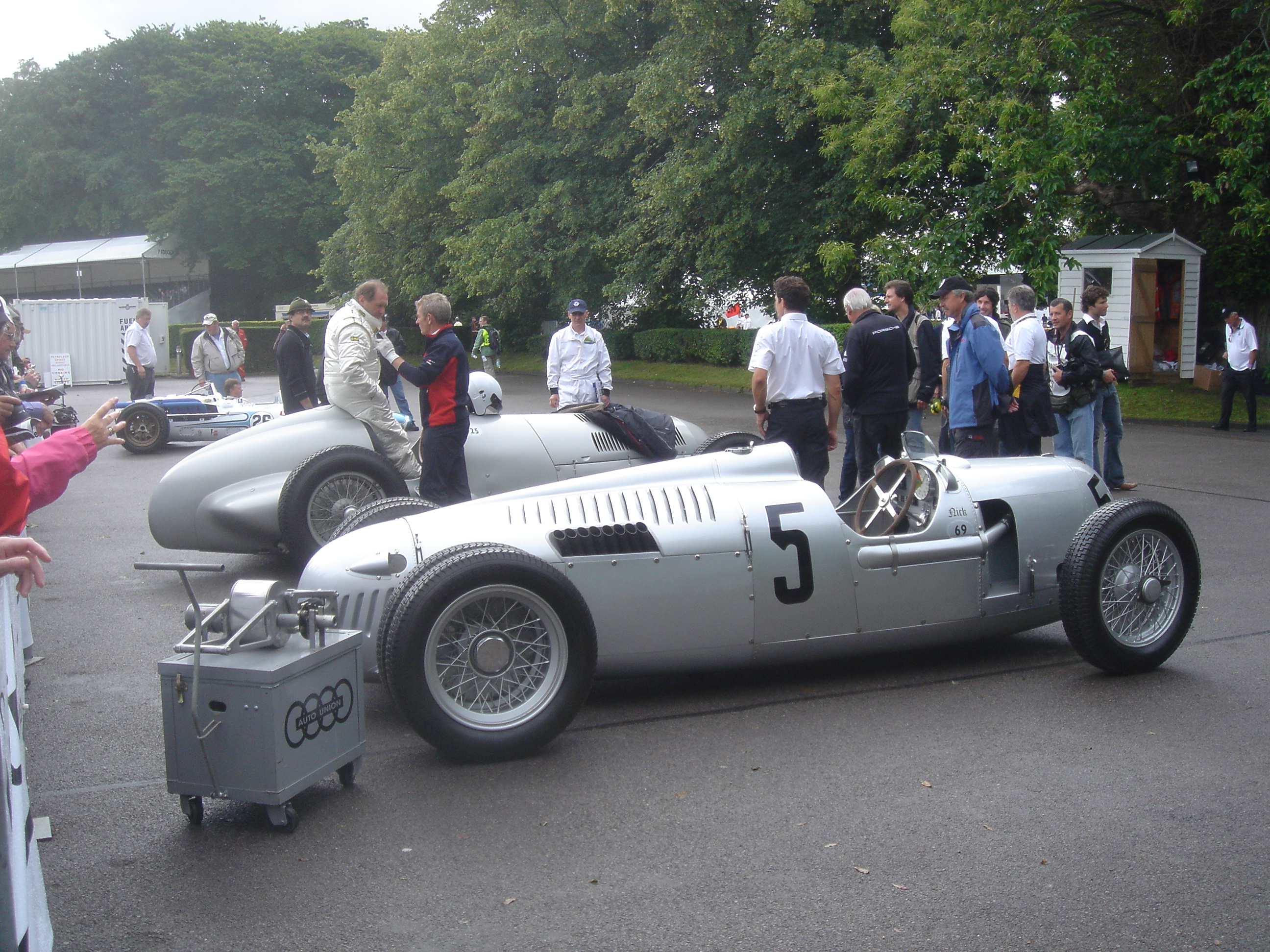
German Auto Union Type C (1936) and Mercedes-Benz W125 (1937), two examples of Silberpfeile (1930s)

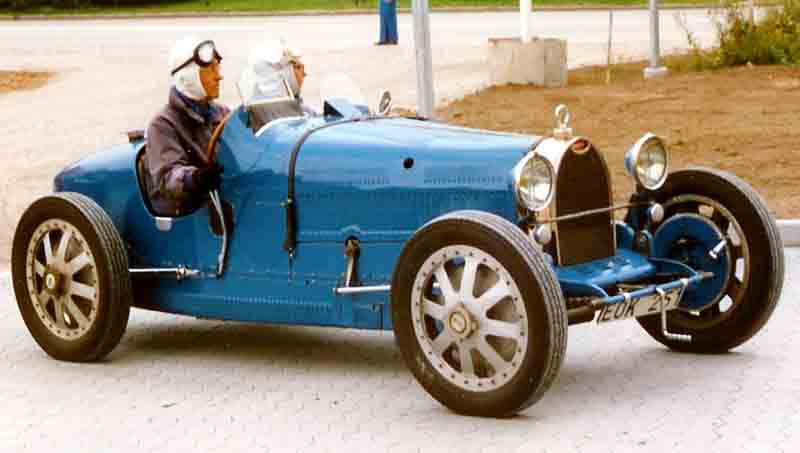
French Bugatti Type 35C (1926)

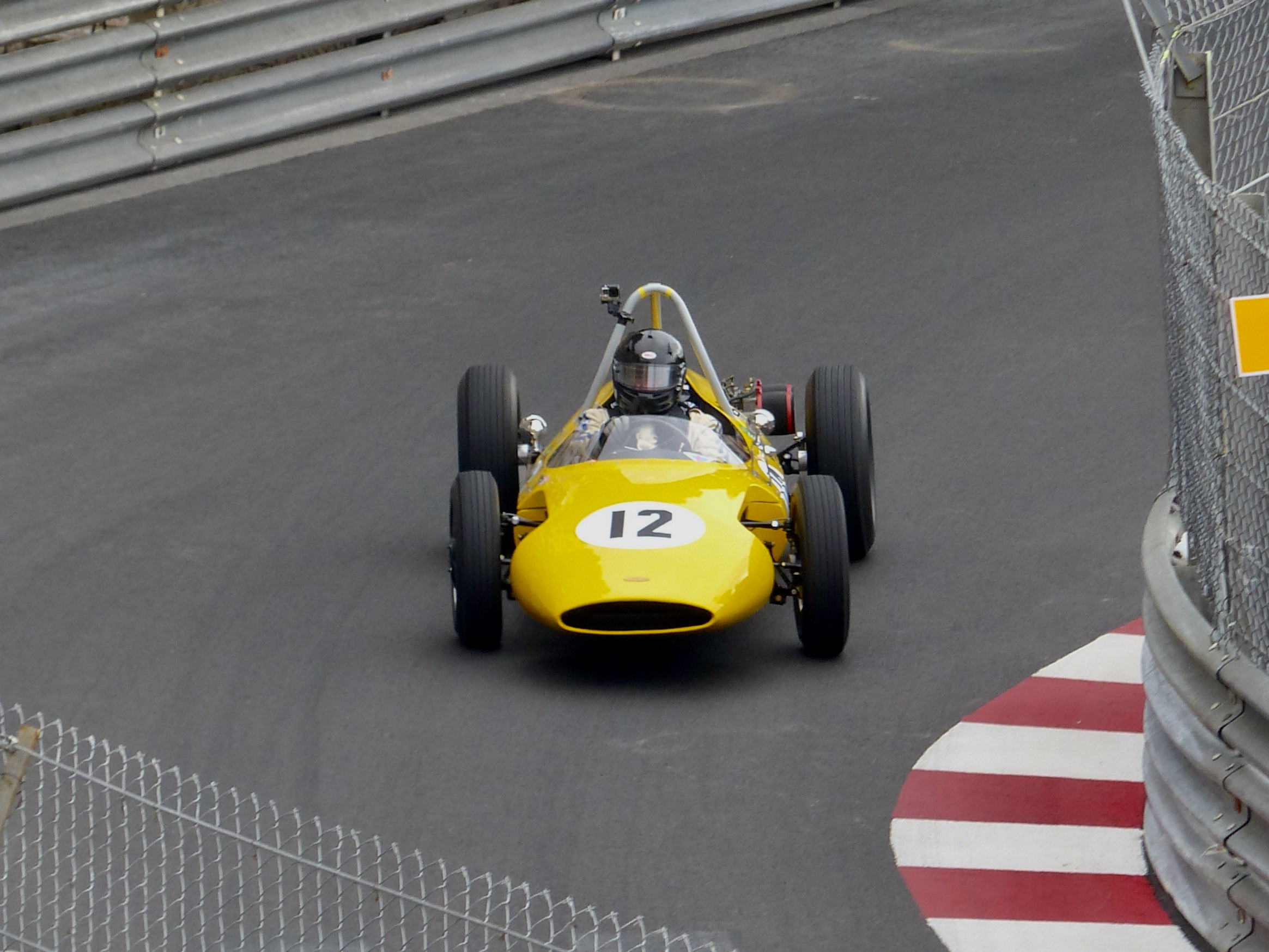
Belgian Emeryson, driven by Michael Kerry at the 2018 Historic Grand Prix of Monaco

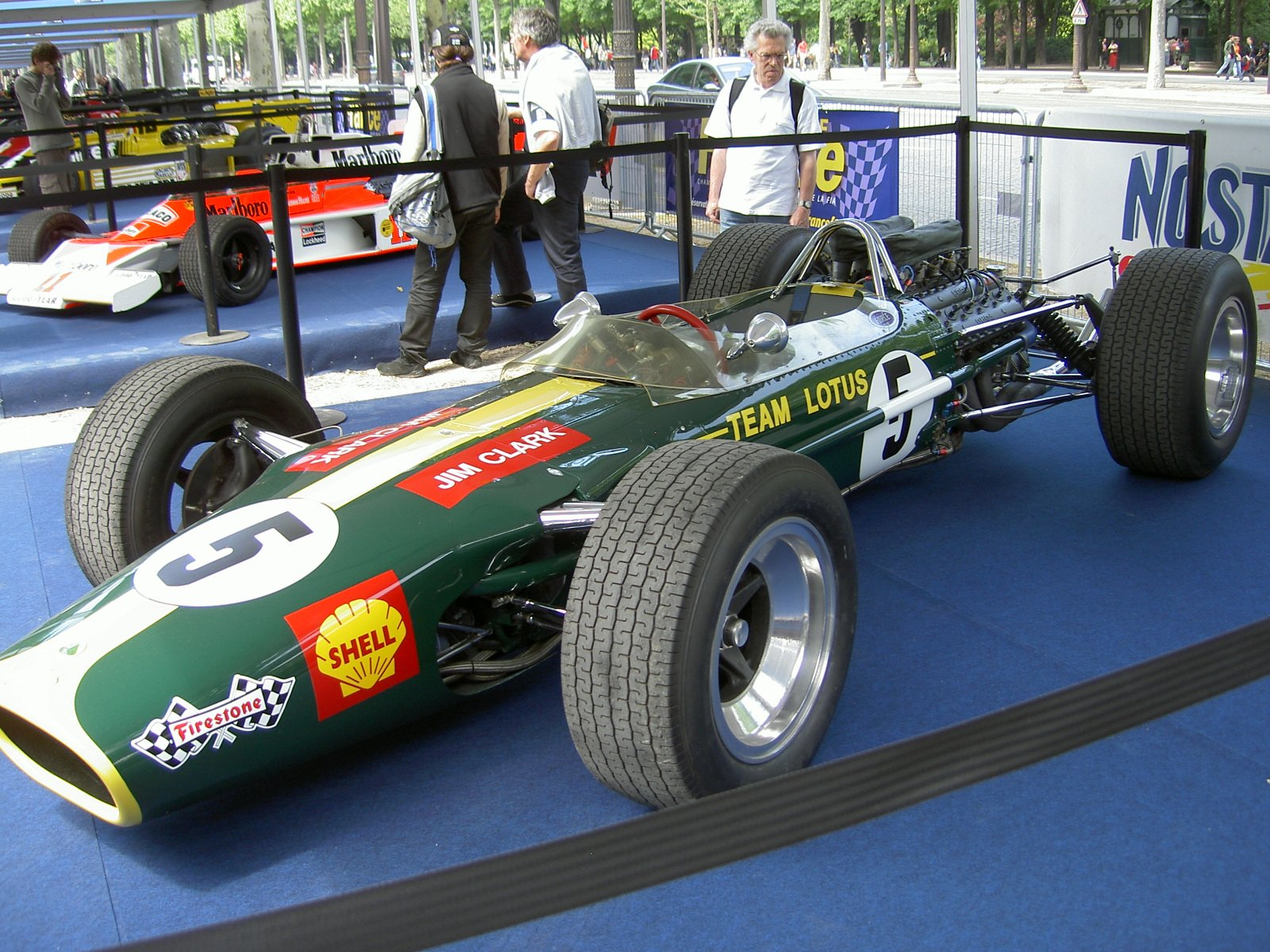
British Lotus 49 (early 1968)

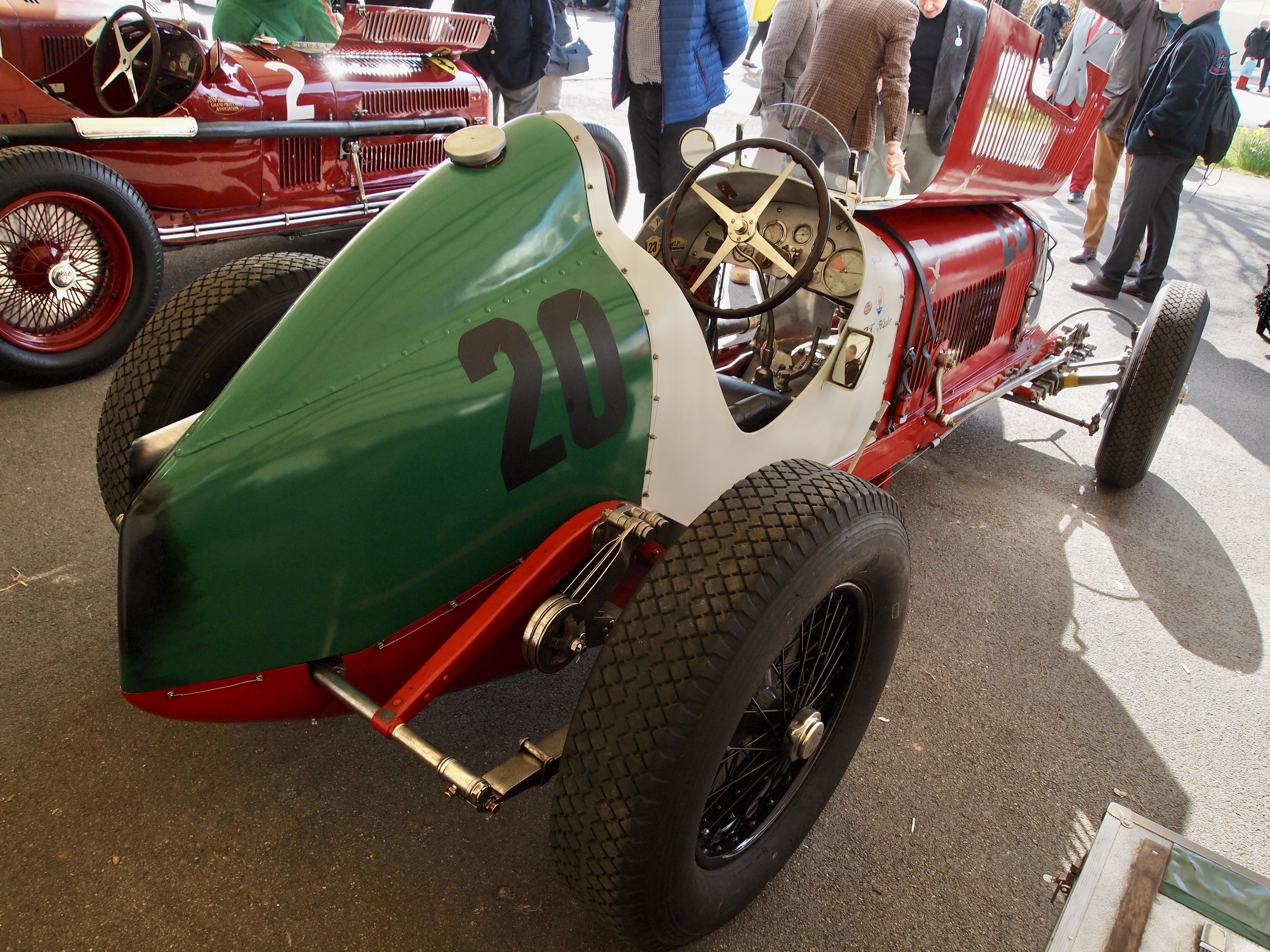
Hungarian Maserati 8CM (ex-László Hartmann), Goodwood Members' Meeting 2015

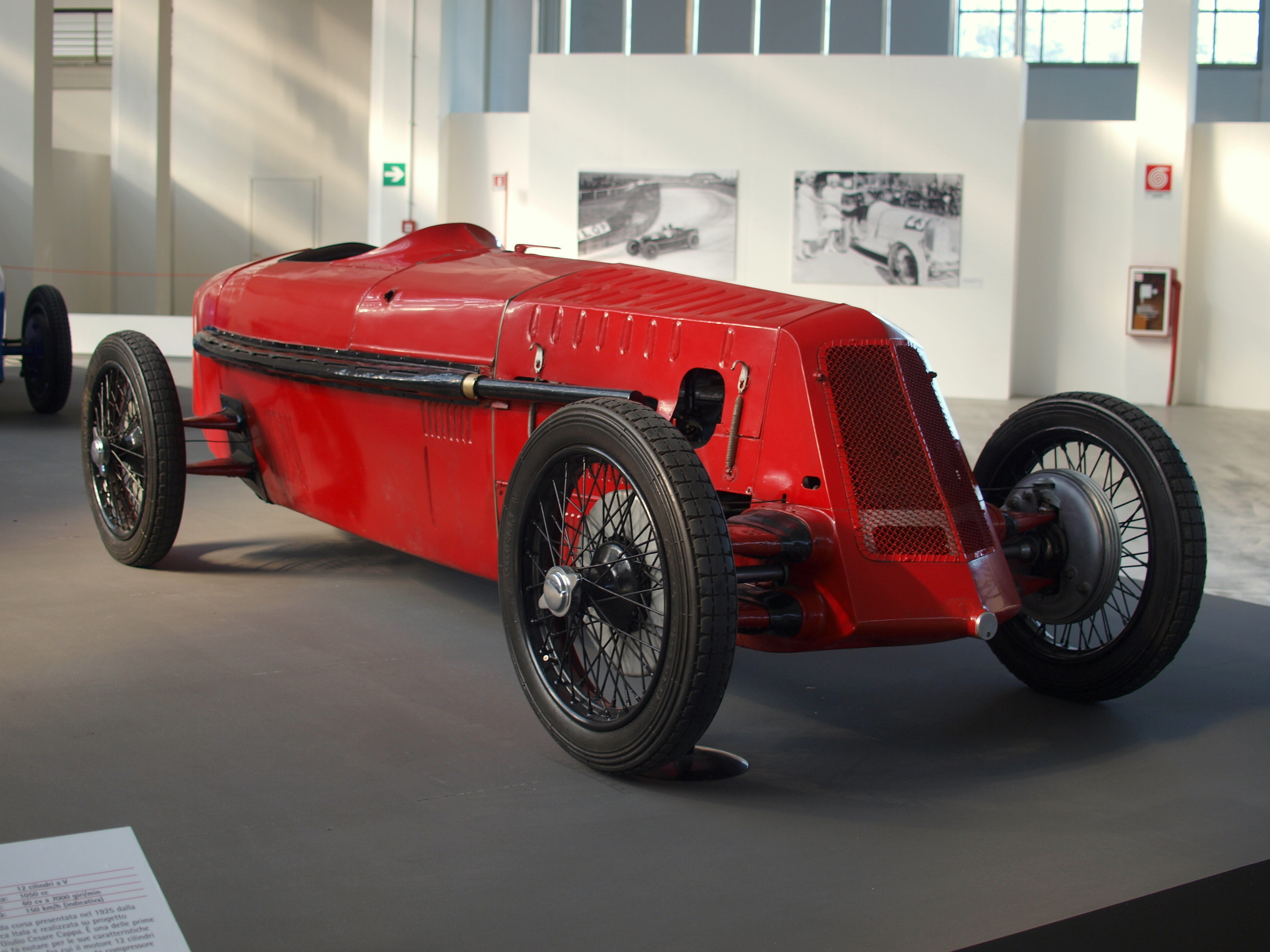
Italian Itala Tipo 11 (1925)

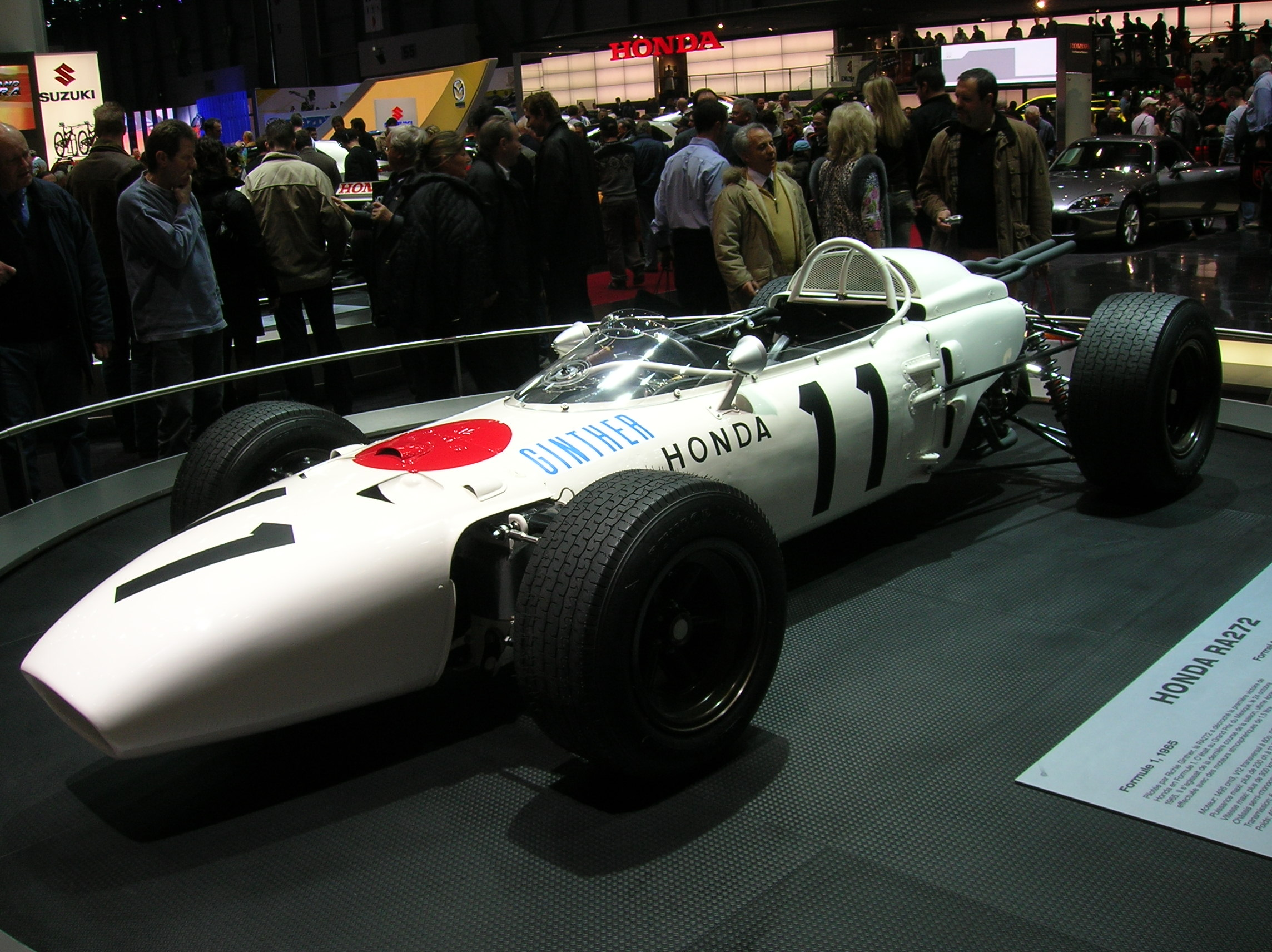
Japanese Honda RA272 (1965)

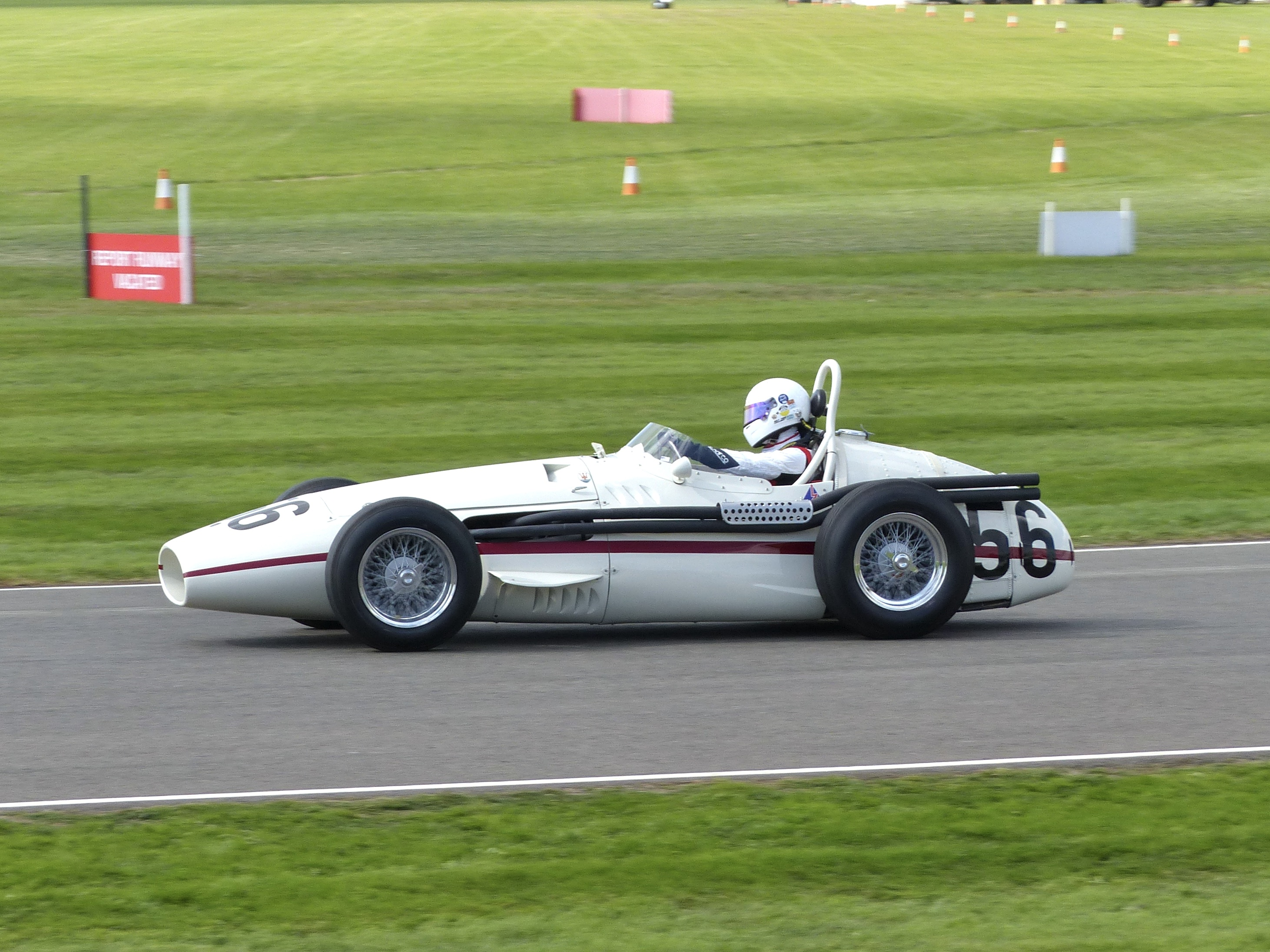
Monegasque Maserati 250F, driven by Niclas Halusa, Goodwood Revival 2019

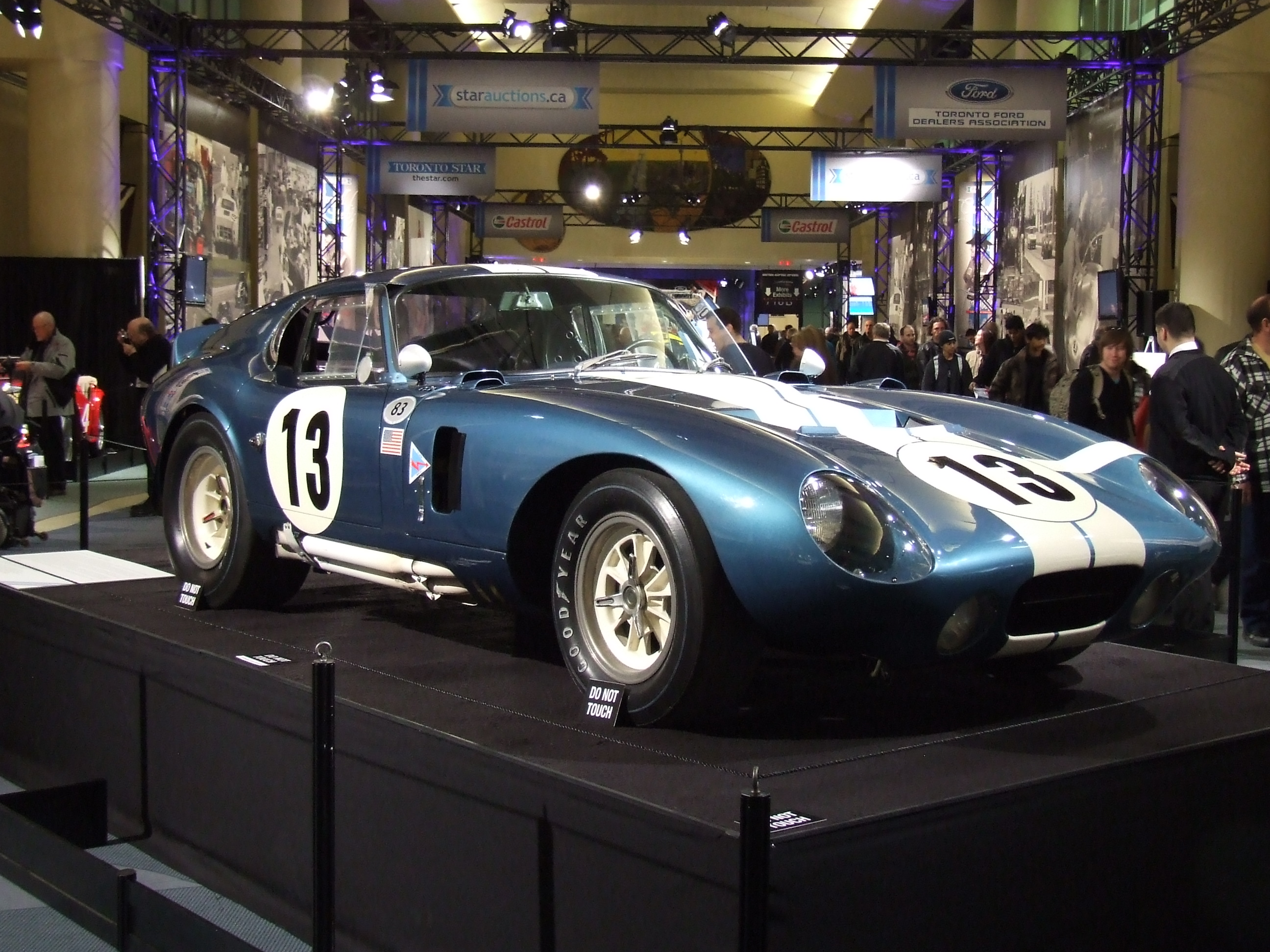
American Shelby Daytona (1964)

Code	Country	Body	Numbers	Marques/Teams
D	Germany	White	Red	Audi, Benz, BMW, Mercedes, Porsche
D	Germany	Silver or bare metal (Silver Arrows)	Red	Audi, Auto Union, Borgward, EMW, Mercedes-Benz, Porsche, Veritas
F	France	Blue (Bleu de France)	White	Alpine, Ballot, Bugatti, Delage, Delahaye, Gordini, Ligier, Matra, Panhard, Peugeot, Talbot
GB	United Kingdom	Green (British racing green)	White	Aston Martin, Bentley, Brabham, BRM, Cooper, Jaguar, Lotus, MG, Vanwall
I	Italy	Red (Rosso corsa)	White	Abarth, Alfa Romeo, Ferrari, Lancia, Maserati, O.S.C.A.
J	Japan	(White with red "sun")	Black	Honda, Nissan, Super Aguri, Toyota
USA	United States	White, Blue lengthwise stripes ("Cunningham racing stripes"), Blue underframe	Blue	Chaparral, Cunningham, Ford, Hendrick, NART, Shelby
USA	United States	Blue (Imperial blue), White lengthwise stripes, White underframe	White	AAR Eagle, Chevrolet, Ford, Hendrick, Scarab, Shelby

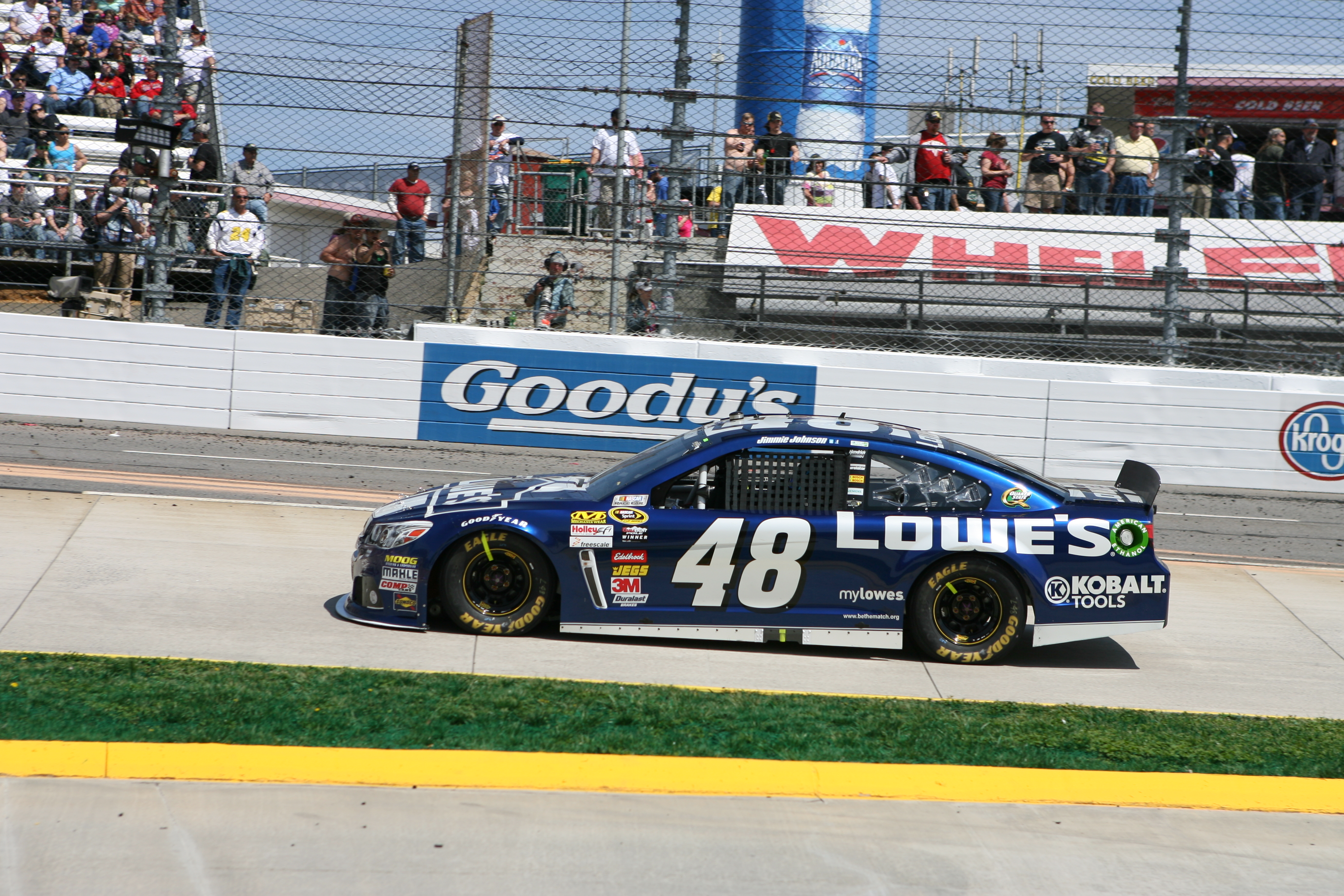
Hendrick Motorsports and Lowe's Home Improvement Warehouse sponsored Chevrolet SS in the 2013 NASCAR Sprint Cup Series, which uses a Briggs Cunningham-style United States national racing colours livery.

=== National list ===
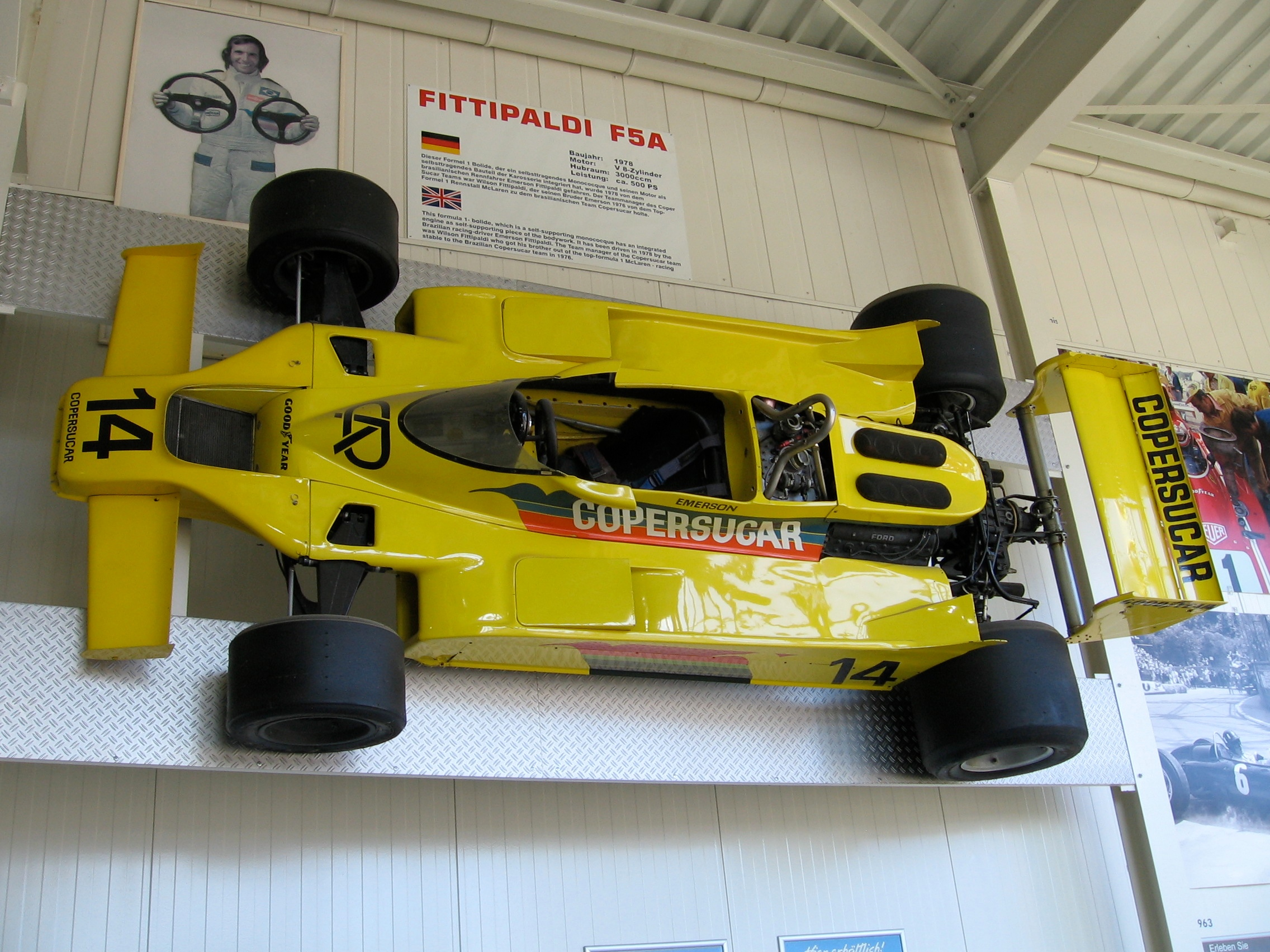
Brazilian Fittipaldi Automotive F5A (1977)

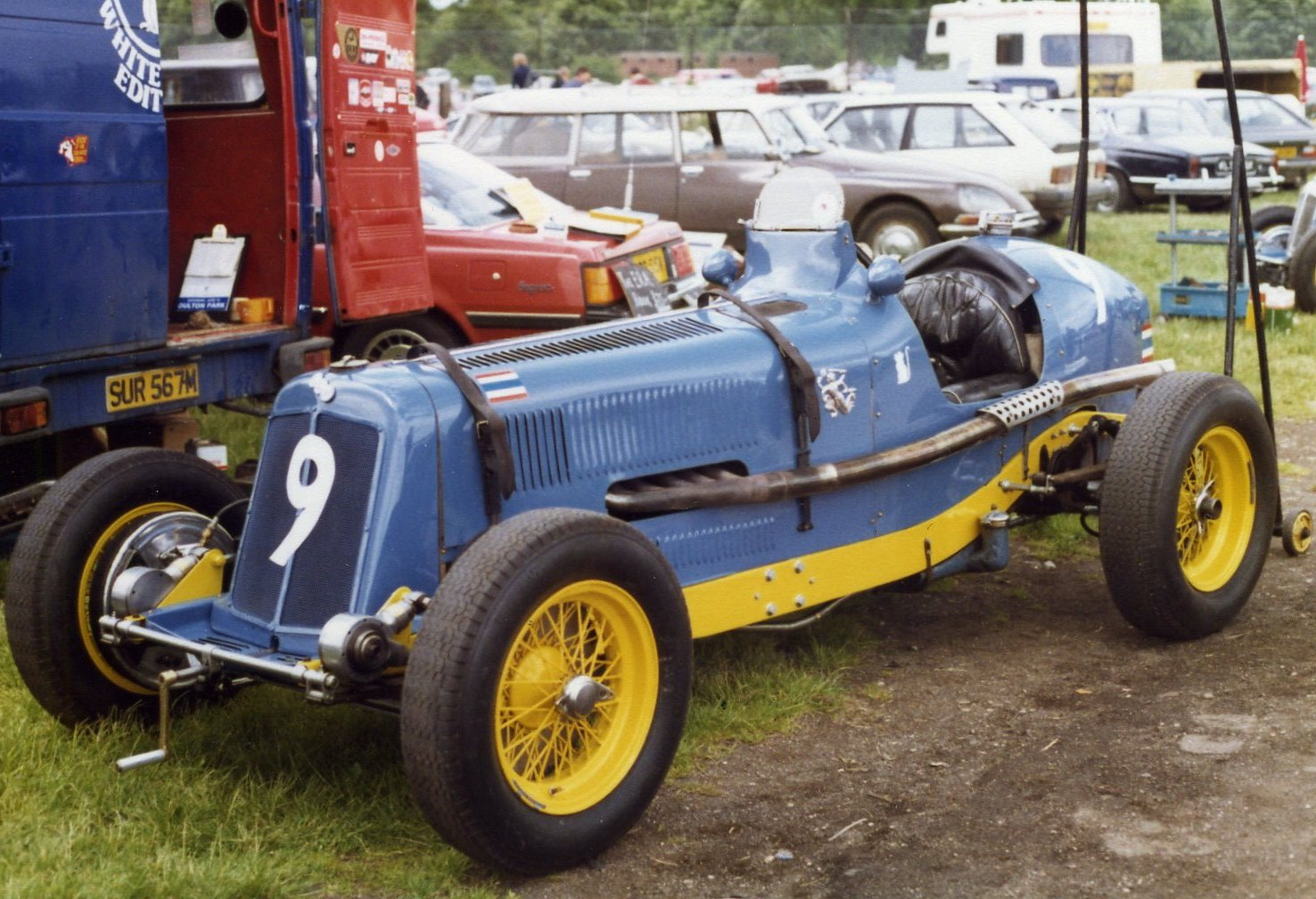
Siamese (later Thai) liveried ERA R12B Hanuman II (1939)

The following schemes have been adopted for various countries at various times:

Code	Country	Body	Bonnet	Other Colours	Numbers	Illustrated example
A	Austria	Blue			Black on white	
ARG	Argentina	Blue	Yellow	Chassis: Black	Red on White	
AUS	Australia	Green	Gold	Blue	Black	
B	Belgium	Yellow			Black	
BR	Brazil	Pale yellow		Chassis/Wheels: Green. Sometimes, Brazilian cars featured lengthwise green stripes	Black	
BUL	Bulgaria	Green	White		Red on white	
C	Cuba	Yellow	Black		Black on white	
CDN	Canada	Traditional colours are British racing green with two white parallel stripes (4 inches wide and 6 inches apart). After the Canadian flag was changed in 1965, red with wide lengthwise white stripes became popular.			Black	
CH	Switzerland	Red	White		Black	
CS	Czechoslovakia	White	Blue/white	Underframe: Red	Blue	
D	Germany	White		Bare metal (aluminium, "Silver Arrows")	Red	
DK	Denmark	Silver-grey		National flag as a lengthwise stripe on bonnet	Red on white	
E	Spain	Red	Yellow	Chassis/Springs: Red	Black on yellow or white on red	
EST	Estonia	White		Black stripe and blue underframe		
ET	Egypt	Pale violet			Red on white	
F	France	Blue			White	
FIN	Finland	White		Two blue stripes on bonnet shaping a Latin cross	Black on white	
GB	United Kingdom	Green		Scottish entrant Rob Walker used dark blue with a white noseband. Ecurie Ecosse also used dark blue. The Arrol Johnston team pre-World War 1 used navy tartan.	White	
GR	Greece	Pale Blue		Two white lengthwise stripes on bonnet	Black on white	
H	Hungary	Front: White; Rear: Green	Red		Black	
HJK	Jordan	Brown			Black on white	
IND	India	Blue		Orange and green stripes on the side and bonnet	Green on Orange	
I	Italy	Red			White	
IRL	Ireland	Green		Horizontal band of orange all around	White	
J	Japan	Ivory White		Red disk on bonnet	White on black	
L	Luxembourg	Tricolour lengthwise stripe (red/white/blue) from front to rear Originally: Pearl gray			Black on white	
LT	Lithuania	Chequered yellow and green			Red	
LV	Latvia	Black	White		Black on white	
MAS	Malaysia	Yellow		White	Black on white/Black	
MC	Monaco	White		Red lengthwise band around car	Black on white	
MEX	Mexico	Gold		Different designs in royal blue (Not strictly an X on the bonnet)	Black on white	
NL	Netherlands	Orange			White	
NZ	New Zealand	Green and silver		Black and silver		
P	Portugal	Red		Underframe: White	White	
PL	Poland	White		Underframe: Red	Red on white	
RCH	Chile	Red	Blue	Underframe: White	Blue/red or red on white	
RO	Romania	Navy blue		Underframe: Red	Yellow	
RP	Philippines	Red	Blue	Red		
RUS	Russia	Yellow			Black	
S	Sweden	Blue bottom, yellow top, three cross bands of blue on top of bonnet			White	
T	Thailand	Pale blue with yellow horizontal band around body and bonnet. Wheels: Pale yellow			White on blue	
U	Uruguay	Pale blue with large red band around the lower part of bonnet			White on black	
USA	United States	White with blue lengthwise stripes		Underframe: Blue	Blue on white	
YV	Venezuela	White with green stripes				
ZA	South Africa	Gold	Green		Black on yellow	

== See also ==
- Racing stripe on notes about USA racing colours.
