= McLaren M4B =

Formula One car

- Category: Formula One
- Constructor: Trojan (manufacturer); McLaren (constructor)
- Designer: Robin Herd
- Predecessor: M2B
- Successor: M5A

Technical specifications
- Chassis: Aluminium monocoque
- Suspension (front): Single top link with radius arms and lower wishbones, outboard coil spring/shock units and anti-roll bar
- Suspension (rear): Twin radius arms, reversed lower wishbones and single top links with outboard coil spring/shock units
- Engine: BRM 1998cc V8 naturally aspirated Mid-engined, longitudinally-mounted
- Transmission: 5-speed manual gearbox
- Power: 280 hp (206 kW)
- Weight: 960 lb (435.5 kg)
- Fuel: Shell
- Tyres: Goodyear

Competition history
- Notable entrants: Bruce McLaren Motor Racing
- Notable drivers: (New Zealand) Bruce McLaren
- Debut: 1967 Race of Champions (non-championship), 1967 Monaco Grand Prix (championship)
- Last event: 1967 BRDC International Trophy (non-championship); 1967 Dutch Grand Prix (championship)
Races	Wins	Poles	F/Laps
2 champ + 3 non-champ	0 (Best result 4th, Monaco)	0	0
- Constructors' Championships: 0 (Best result 10th, 1967)
- Drivers' Championships: 0

The McLaren M4B was a Formula One racing car constructed by Trojan for Bruce McLaren Motor Racing and raced five times by New Zealander Bruce McLaren at the start of 1967.

The M4B was based on the M4A Formula 2 car as a stopgap between the M2B and the M5A. Additional fuel tanks were added either side of the cockpit to allow the car to run a full Grand Prix distance, and the rear end of the car was cut away to accommodate a 2.0 litre BRM type 56-2 V8, an enlarged and updated version of the engine with which Graham Hill had won the World Championship in 1962.

The car made its debut in the 1967 Race of Champions at Brands Hatch, showing promise with fourth and sixth places in the heats before a missed gear by McLaren in the final race put him out with engine failure. In the Spring Trophy at Oulton Park McLaren managed fifth place in both heats and the race, and came fifth again in the International Trophy at Silverstone.

== 1967 Grand Prix season ==
The M4B's Grand Prix debut came at Monaco, where its short wheelbase made it surprisingly competitive. McLaren ran as high as third before a pit stop to replace a flat battery dropped him back to fourth at the finish - the first points scored by a McLaren chassis that season.

At the next event, the Dutch Grand Prix, Bruce McLaren finished 14th in qualifying. On the second lap of the race, McLaren crashed out, running the only M4B. The car was later repaired, but caught fire during a test at Goodwood and was written off.

== Formula One World Championship results ==
(key) (Results in bold indicate pole position; results in italics indicate fastest lap)

Year	Entrant	Engine(s)	Tyres	Drivers	1	2	3	4	5	6	7	8	9	10	11	Pts.	WCC
1967	Bruce McLaren Motor Racing	BRM V8	**G**		RSA	MON	NED	BEL	FRA	GBR	GER	CAN	ITA	USA	MEX	**3**	**10th**
1967	Bruce McLaren Motor Racing	BRM V8	**G**	Bruce McLaren		4	Ret									**3**	**10th**

== Non-Championship results ==
(key) (results in bold indicate pole position; results in italics indicate fastest lap)

Year	Entrants	Engines	Tyres	Drivers	1	2	3	4	5	6
1967	Bruce McLaren Motor Racing	BRM V8	**G**		ROC	SPC	INT	SYR	OUL	ESP
1967	Bruce McLaren Motor Racing	BRM V8	**G**	Bruce McLaren	Ret	5	5			
