= McLaren M5A =

Formula One racing car

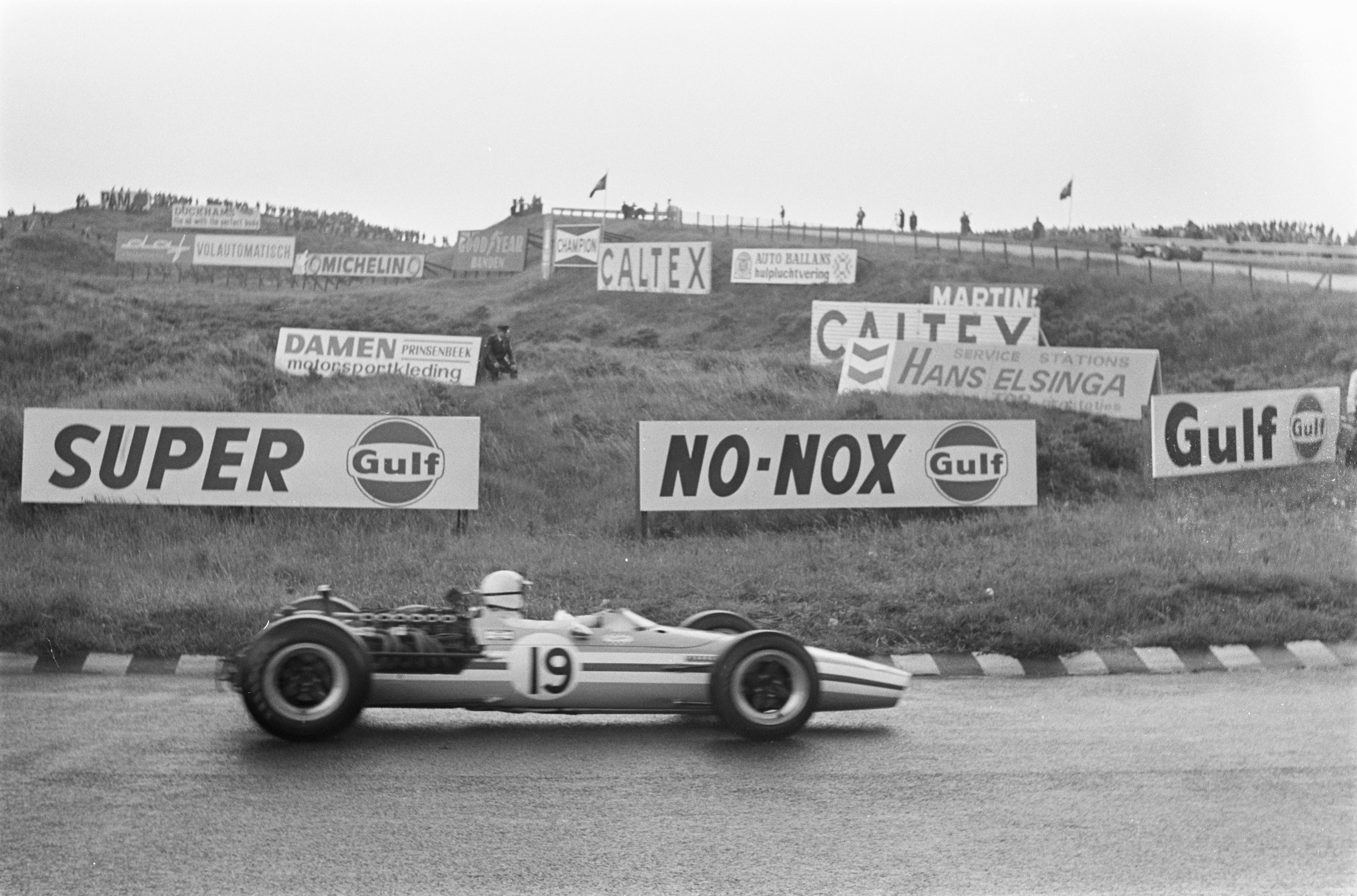
- Category: Formula One
- Constructor: Bruce McLaren Motor Racing
- Designer: Robin Herd
- Predecessor: M4B
- Successor: M7A

Technical specifications
- Chassis: Aluminium monocoque
- Suspension (front): Single top link with radius arm, lower wishbone, anti-roll bar and outboard coil spring/shock units
- Suspension (rear): upper and lower wishbone, anti-roll bar and outboard coil spring/shock units
- Engine: BRM 2998cc V12 naturally aspirated Mid-engine, longitudinally mounted
- Transmission: Hewland 5-speed manual
- Fuel: Shell
- Tyres: Goodyear

Competition history
- Notable entrants: Bruce McLaren Motor Racing
- Notable drivers: (New Zealand) Bruce McLaren (New Zealand) Denis Hulme (Sweden) Jo Bonnier
- Debut: 1967 Canadian Grand Prix
Races	Wins	Poles	F/Laps
11	0	0	0
- Constructors' Championships: 0
- Drivers' Championships: 0

The McLaren M5A was a racing car constructed by Bruce McLaren Motor Racing, and was McLaren's first purpose-built Formula One car. Like its M4B predecessor, only one car of this type was ever built. The car was the first to use the BRM type 101 3.0 litre V12 engine, which produced 365 bhp.

The M5A's first race was the rain-affected 1967 Canadian Grand Prix, and after an early spin McLaren worked his way up to fourth place, before a pit stop to change a flat battery caused by McLaren's decision not to use an alternator pushed him back down to seventh place at the end. At the next race in Italy McLaren qualified third, but broke two connecting rods while battling for fourth place and retired after 46 laps. The last two races of the season were no better, with McLaren retiring from both.

With McLaren missing the season-opening 1968 South African Grand Prix, reigning World Champion Denis Hulme took over the M5A, now painted orange rather than the original blood-red, and finished 2 laps adrift in fifth place.

== Joakim Bonnier Racing Team ==
Swedish privateer Jo Bonnier bought the M5A to replace his ageing Cooper T81, and used it to take part in 7 more Grands Prix in 1968, as well as that year's Race of Champions, International Trophy and International Gold Cup meetings. His best result came in Italy, with sixth place, but by now it was clear that the car was becoming both unreliable and slow, so Bonnier retired the car and hung it on the wall of his art gallery.

The car was later repainted in its original colours and demonstrated in various historic races around the world. Sir Jack Brabham crashed the car heavily after a coming together with Jackie Oliver at the 1999 Goodwood Revival Meeting and had to be cut free from the car. The car has since been restored back to original condition.

== Formula One World Championship results ==
(key) (Results in bold indicate pole position; results in italics indicate fastest lap)

Year	Entrant	Engine(s)	Tyres	Drivers	1	2	3	4	5	6	7	8	9	10	11	12	WDC	Points
1967	Bruce McLaren Motor Racing	BRM V12	**G**		RSA	MON	NED	BEL	FRA	GBR	GER	CAN	ITA	USA	MEX		10th	3^{1}
1967	Bruce McLaren Motor Racing	BRM V12	**G**	Bruce McLaren								7	Ret	Ret	Ret		10th	3^{1}
1968	Bruce McLaren Motor Racing	BRM V12	**G**		RSA	ESP	MON	BEL	NED	FRA	GBR	GER	ITA	CAN	USA	MEX	10th	3
1968	Bruce McLaren Motor Racing	BRM V12	**G**	Denny Hulme	5												10th	3
1968	Joakim Bonnier Racing Team	BRM V12	**G**	Joakim Bonnier			DNQ	Ret	8		Ret		6	Ret	NC	PO	10th	3

^1 This total includes points scored by the McLaren M4B used by McLaren earlier in the season.

== Non-Championship results ==
(key) (results in bold indicate pole position; results in italics indicate fastest lap)

Year	Entrants	Engines	Tyres	Drivers	1	2	3
1968	Joakim Bonnier Racing Team	BRM V12	**G**		ROC	INT	OUL
1968	Joakim Bonnier Racing Team	BRM V12	**G**	Joakim Bonnier	Ret	Ret	Ret
