= Honda RA302 =

Formula One racing car made by Honda

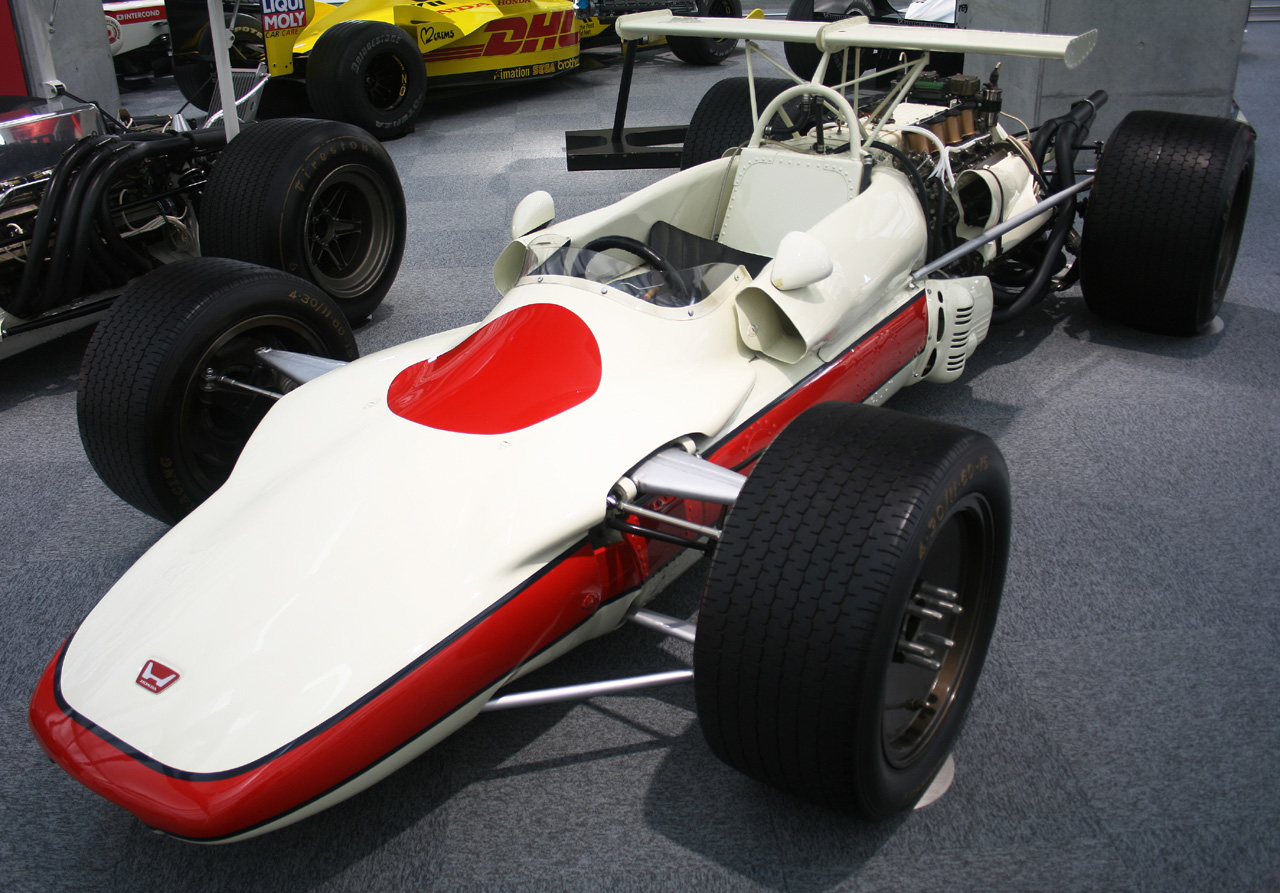
- Category: Formula One
- Constructor: Honda R&D
- Designers: Yoshio Nakamura, Shoichi Sano
- Predecessor: RA301
- Successor: RA106

Technical specifications
- Chassis: Magnesium-skinned monocoque
- Suspension (front): double-wishbone
- Suspension (rear): double-wishbone
- Engine: Honda RA302E, 2,987.5 cc (182.31 cu in) 120° V8 naturally aspirated Mid-engined, longitudinally mounted air cooled
- Transmission: Honda 5-speed manual
- Fuel: BP/Shell
- Tyres: Firestone

Competition history
- Notable entrants: Honda Racing France
- Notable drivers: (France) Jo Schlesser
- Debut: 1968 French Grand Prix, Rouen.
Races	Wins	Poles	F/Laps
1	0	0	0
- Constructors' Championships: 0
- Drivers' Championships: 0
- Unless otherwise stated, all data refer to Formula One World Championship Grands Prix only.

The Honda RA302 was a Formula One racing car produced by Honda Racing, and introduced by Honda Racing France during the 1968 Formula One season. The car was built based on an order by Soichiro Honda to develop an air-cooled Formula One engine. The magnesium-skinned car was entered in the Formula One race alongside the water-cooled, aluminium-bodied RA301 which had been developed by the existing Honda team and British Lola Cars.

It would only appear in one race, the 1968 French Grand Prix at Rouen-Les-Essarts, driven by Jo Schlesser. Schlesser was chosen to drive the RA302 because normal Honda driver John Surtees (who was the 1964 world champion and would finish second in that race) refused to drive it as he deemed it to be unsafe and labelled it as a "potential deathtrap". This was proven on lap three of the Grand Prix; Schlesser crashed at the Virage des Six Frères section of the circuit and the car came to rest sideways against a bank. The magnesium-bodied Honda and 58 laps worth of fuel ignited instantly, killing Schlesser and destroying the original RA302.

A second RA302 was built, with slight modifications, earmarked for Surtees to drive at the 1968 Italian Grand Prix, but he again refused to drive it. Honda decided to pull out of Grand Prix racing and did not return as a constructor until 2006 with the RA106. In 2012, the RA302 intended for Surtees at the Italian Grand Prix was on display at the Honda Collection Hall.

The magnesium-bodied RA302 of Jo Schlesser crashes and burns on lap 3 of the 1968 French Grand Prix. Schlesser was killed.

== Formula One World Championship results ==
(key) (results in bold indicate pole position; results in italics indicate fastest lap)

Year	Entrant	Engine	Tyres	Driver	1	2	3	4	5	6	7	8	9	10	11	12	Points	WCC
1968	Honda Racing	Honda V8	**F**		RSA	ESP	MON	BEL	NED	FRA	GBR	GER	ITA	CAN	USA	MEX	**14**	**6th**
1968	Honda Racing	Honda V8	**F**	Jo Schlesser						Ret							**14**	**6th**

- All 14 points scored by Honda RA301 entries.
