= 1968 French Grand Prix =

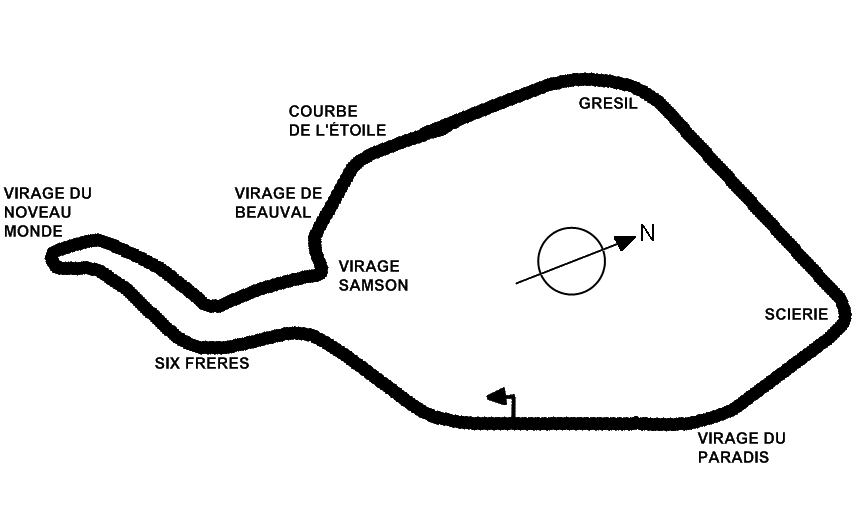
- The Rouen Les Essarts circuit in 1968

Race details
- Date: 7 July 1968
- Official name: LIV Grand Prix de France
- Location: Rouen-Les-Essarts, Grand-Couronne, France
- Course: Permanent racing facility
- Course length: 6.542 km (4.065 miles)
- Distance: 60 laps, 392.520 km (243.901 miles)
- Weather: Wet

Pole position
Driver	(Austria) Jochen Rindt	Brabham-Repco
- Time: 1:56.1

Fastest lap
Driver	(Mexico) Pedro Rodríguez	BRM
- Time: 2:11.5 on lap 19

Podium
First	(Belgium) Jacky Ickx	Ferrari
Second	(United Kingdom) John Surtees	Honda
Third	(United Kingdom) Jackie Stewart	Matra-Ford

The 1968 French Grand Prix was a Formula One motor race held at the Rouen-Les-Essarts Circuit on 7 July 1968. It was race 6 of 12 in both the 1968 World Championship of Drivers and the 1968 International Cup for Formula One Manufacturers. The 60-lap race was won by Ferrari driver Jacky Ickx after he started from third position. John Surtees finished second for the Honda team and Matra driver Jackie Stewart came in third.

The French driver Jo Schlesser had a fatal accident on the third lap of the race, when he lost control in the then-new Honda RA302 chassis which overturned and caught fire partially due to its magnesium content. He was chosen as driver when regular Honda F1 driver John Surtees refused to drive the new car, opting for the older RA301 chassis, on the grounds that the new car was unsafe. This race was a turning point in Formula One as the death of Schlesser prompted many safety precautions in later races.

This was also the last F1 race to take place at Rouen-Les Essarts.

== Classification ==
=== Qualifying ===
Pos	No	Driver	Constructor	Time	Gap
1	2	(Austria) Jochen Rindt	Brabham-Repco	1:56.1	—
2	28	(United Kingdom) Jackie Stewart	Matra-Ford	1:57.3	+1.2
3	26	(Belgium) Jacky Ickx	Ferrari	1:57.7	+1.6
4	8	(New Zealand) Denny Hulme	McLaren-Ford	1:57.7	+1.6
5	24	(New Zealand) Chris Amon	Ferrari	1:57.8	+1.7
6	10	(New Zealand) Bruce McLaren	McLaren-Ford	1:58.0	+1.9
7	16	(United Kingdom) John Surtees	Honda	1:58.2	+2.1
8	6	(France) Jean-Pierre Beltoise	Matra	1:58.9	+2.8
9	12	(United Kingdom) Graham Hill	Lotus-Ford	1:59.1	+3.0
10	20	(Mexico) Pedro Rodríguez	BRM	1:59.3	+3.2
11	14	(United Kingdom) Jackie Oliver	Lotus-Ford	2:00.2	+4.1
12	34	(Switzerland) Jo Siffert	Lotus-Ford	2:00.3	+4.2
13	22	(United Kingdom) Richard Attwood	BRM	2:00.8	+4.7
14	4	(Australia) Jack Brabham	Brabham-Repco	2:00.8	+4.7
15	36	(United Kingdom) Piers Courage	BRM	2:01.1	+5.0
16	32	(France) Johnny Servoz-Gavin	Cooper-BRM	2:01.2	+5.1
17	18	(France) Jo Schlesser	Honda	2:04.5	+8.4
18	30	(United Kingdom) Vic Elford	Cooper-BRM	2:05.5	+9.4

=== Race ===
Pos	No	Driver	Constructor	Laps	Time/Retired	Grid	Points
1	26	(Belgium) Jacky Ickx	Ferrari	60	2:25:40.9	3	9
2	16	(United Kingdom) John Surtees	Honda	60	+ 1:58.6	7	6
3	28	(United Kingdom) Jackie Stewart	Matra-Ford	59	+ 1 lap	2	4
4	30	(United Kingdom) Vic Elford	Cooper-BRM	58	+ 2 laps	17	3
5	8	(New Zealand) Denny Hulme	McLaren-Ford	58	+ 2 laps	4	2
6	36	(United Kingdom) Piers Courage	BRM	57	+ 3 laps	14	1
7	22	(United Kingdom) Richard Attwood	BRM	57	+ 3 laps	12	
8	10	(New Zealand) Bruce McLaren	McLaren-Ford	56	+ 4 laps	6	
9	6	(France) Jean-Pierre Beltoise	Matra	56	+ 4 laps	8	
10	24	(New Zealand) Chris Amon	Ferrari	55	+ 5 laps	5	
11	34	(Switzerland) Jo Siffert	Lotus-Ford	54	+ 6 laps	11	
NC	20	(Mexico) Pedro Rodríguez	BRM	53	+ 7 laps	10	
Ret	2	(Austria) Jochen Rindt	Brabham-Repco	45	Fuel leak	1	
Ret	4	(Australia) Jack Brabham	Brabham-Repco	15	Fuel pump	13	
Ret	12	(United Kingdom) Graham Hill	Lotus-Ford	14	Halfshaft	9	
Ret	32	(France) Johnny Servoz-Gavin	Cooper-BRM	14	Accident	15	
Ret	18	(France) Jo Schlesser	Honda	2	Fatal accident	16	
DNS	14	(United Kingdom) Jackie Oliver	Lotus-Ford		Accident in practice		

Jo Schlesser's Honda RA302 crashes at Virage des Six Frères, igniting the magnesium body and killing Schlesser.

== Notes ==
- This was the Formula One World Championship debut for British driver Vic Elford.
- This race saw the first pole position for Jochen Rindt and an Austrian driver, the first fastest lap for Pedro Rodríguez and a Mexican driver and the first Grand Prix win for Jacky Ickx and a Belgian driver.

== Championship standings after the race ==
Drivers' Championship standings

	Pos	Driver	Points
	1	(United Kingdom) Graham Hill	24
6	2	(Belgium) Jacky Ickx	16
1	3	(United Kingdom) Jackie Stewart	16
1	4	(New Zealand) Denny Hulme	12
1	5	(Mexico) Pedro Rodríguez	10

Constructors' Championship standings

	Pos	Constructor	Points
	1	(United Kingdom) Lotus-Ford	29
	2	(United Kingdom) McLaren-Ford	19
2	3	(Italy) Ferrari	19
	4	(France) Matra-Ford	19
2	5	(United Kingdom) BRM	17

- Note: Only the top five positions are included for both sets of standings.

Previous race: 1968 Dutch Grand Prix	FIA Formula One World Championship; 1968 season	Next race: 1968 British Grand Prix
Previous race: 1967 French Grand Prix	French Grand Prix	Next race: 1969 French Grand Prix
