= Honda in Formula One =

Formula One activities of Honda

Honda
- Full name: Honda Racing F1 Team (2006–2008); Honda R & D Company (1964–1968)
- Base: Tokyo, Japan (1964); Amsterdam, Netherlands (1965–1966); Slough, UK (1967–1968); Brackley, UK & Sakura, Japan (2006–2008); Milton Keynes, UK & Sakura, Japan (2015–current)
- Noted staff: Yoshio Nakamura; Nobuhiko Kawamoto; Yoshitoshi Sakurai; Osamu Goto; Takeo Kiuchi; Ross Brawn; Nick Fry; Toyoharu Tanabe; Masashi Yamamoto; Yasuaki Asaki; Tetsushi Kakuda
- Noted drivers: (United States) Ronnie Bucknum; (United States) Richie Ginther; (France) Jo Schlesser; (United Kingdom) John Surtees; (United Kingdom) Jenson Button; (Brazil) Rubens Barrichello
- Website: honda.racing/f1
- Previous name: British American Racing
- Next name: Brawn GP Formula One Team

Formula One World Championship career
- First entry: 1964 German Grand Prix
- Races entered: 88
- Engines: Honda
- Constructors' Championships: 0
- Drivers' Championships: 0
- Race victories: 3
- Podiums: 9
- Points: 154
- Pole positions: 2
- Fastest laps: 2
- Final entry: 2008 Brazilian Grand Prix

Honda as a Formula One engine manufacturer
Formula One World Championship career
- First entry: 1964 German Grand Prix
- Last entry: 2026 Las Vegas Grand Prix
- Races entered: 503 (501 starts)
- Chassis: Honda, Spirit, Williams, Lotus, McLaren, Tyrrell, BAR, Jordan, Super Aguri, Toro Rosso, Red Bull, AlphaTauri, Aston Martin
- Constructors' Championships: 6 (1986, 1987, 1988, 1989, 1990, 1991) (Note: The total tally does not include the 2022 and 2023 constructors' titles achieved by RBPT-badged Honda power units.)
- Drivers' Championships: 6 (1987, 1988, 1989, 1990, 1991, 2021) (Note: The total tally does not include the 2022, 2023, and 2024 drivers' titles achieved by RBPT-badged Honda power units.)
- Race victories: 89 (Note: The total tally does not include 4 wins achieved by Mugen-Honda, 17 wins by RBPT-badged Honda power units, and 38 wins by Honda RBPT.)
- Podiums: 223
- Points: 3414
- Pole positions: 90
- Fastest laps: 76

The Japanese automotive manufacturer Honda has participated in Formula One, as an engine manufacturer and team owner, for various periods since 1964. Since 2015, they have been active as engine manufacturers of the RA Series Hybrid power units which were in use for Red Bull Racing from 2019 till 2025 despite formal retreat of Honda after 2021. Since 2026, the Honda engines power Aston Martin.

== History ==
Honda's involvement in Formula One began as a full team and engine entry in the 1964 season, and in 1965 they achieved their first victory at the Mexican Grand Prix. After further success with John Surtees, Honda withdrew at the end of the 1968 season due to difficulties selling road cars in the United States and Honda driver Jo Schlesser's fatal accident.

Honda returned in 1983 as an engine manufacturer, which started a very successful period for the company. After winning races in 1984 and 1985, Honda won the Constructors' Championship every year between 1986 and 1991 with Williams and McLaren, and the Drivers' Championship every year from 1987 to 1991 with Nelson Piquet, Ayrton Senna and Alain Prost. Honda withdrew at the end of 1992 after having achieved their targets and suffering the burst of the Japanese asset price bubble.

Honda returned again in 2000, providing engines for British American Racing (BAR). BAR-Honda finished second in the Constructors' Championship in 2004, and by the end of 2005 Honda had bought out the BAR team, which was rebranded as Honda for 2006. After winning in 2006 with Jenson Button at the Hungarian Grand Prix, Honda announced in December 2008 that they would be exiting Formula One with immediate effect due to the 2008 financial crisis, following limited success across 2007 and 2008.

In 2015, Honda returned to the sport as a works power unit supplier to McLaren, providing their RA Series Hybrid engines to the team. The first iterations of the Honda power units proved to be uncompetitive, and McLaren and Honda split after three years. Toro Rosso agreed to use Honda engines for the 2018 season as a works outfit, and after Honda showed fast development with the engines, Red Bull Racing agreed to also take on Honda engines for the 2019 season. Honda achieved their first victory of the hybrid era at the 2019 Austrian Grand Prix, and numerous wins followed thereafter with both teams. The programme culminated in the 2021 season, when Honda-powered driver Max Verstappen won the World Championship. The company officially withdrew from the series after 2021 to focus its resources on carbon neutral technologies, although an arrangement was made for them to continue supplying the Red Bull teams until the end of 2025, with the Honda-built engines winning further titles in 2022, 2023 and 2024. (Note: To reflect Honda's official withdrawal, the power units were badged as RBPT in 2022 and as Honda RBPT between 2023 and 2025.) They will make a full-scale return in 2026 with Aston Martin as their works partner, enticed by the introduction of more sustainable regulations.

As an engine manufacturer, Honda has won six World Constructors' Championships, six World Drivers' Championships and over 80 Grands Prix, ranking fifth in Formula One history. In addition to their success as an engine manufacturer, their three Grand Prix wins as a team owner make them the only Japanese or Asian team to win in Formula One.

== First era (1964–1968) ==
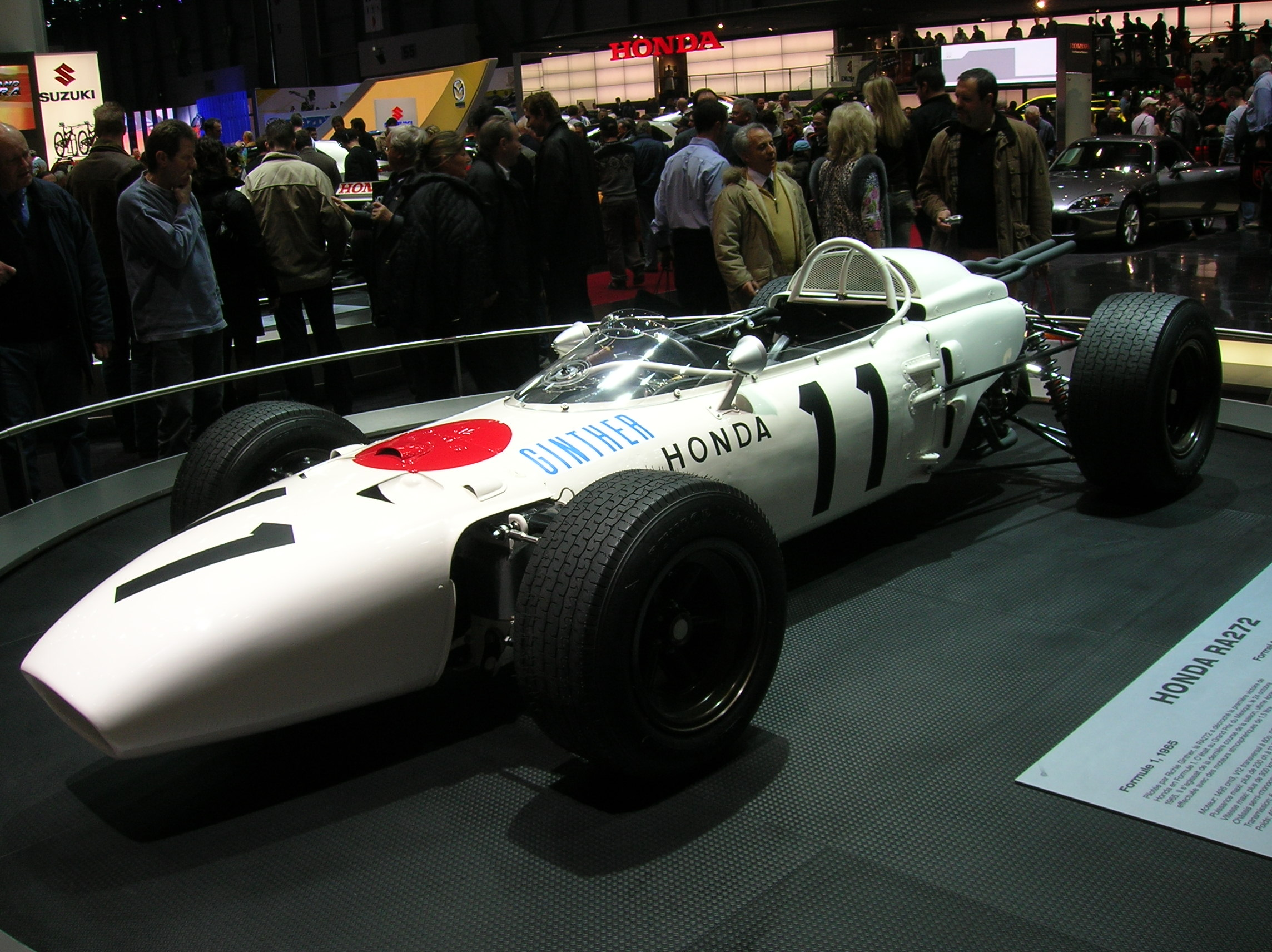
Restored 1965 Honda RA272, the first Japanese car to win in Formula One. The car is painted in the racing colours of Japan.

Honda entered Formula One Grand Prix racing in 1964 just four years after producing their first road car. They began development of the RA271 in 1962 and startled the European-dominated Formula One garages with their all-Japanese factory team (except for American drivers Ronnie Bucknum and Richie Ginther). For the RA271, Honda built their own engine and chassis, something only Ferrari and BRM – of the other teams still running in 1962 – had previously done.

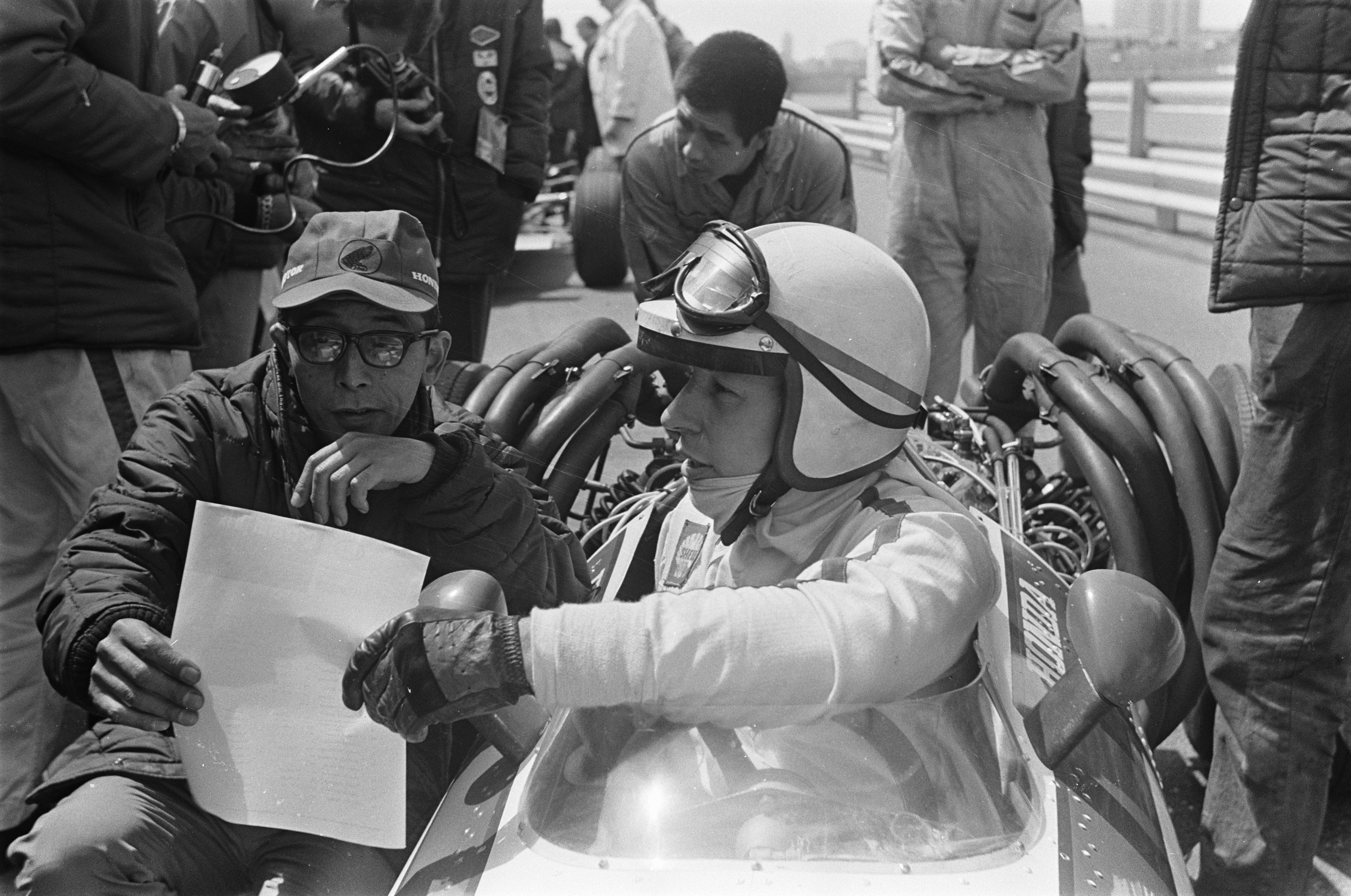
John Surtees and Yoshio Nakamura at the 1968 Dutch Grand Prix

In only their second year of competition, Honda reached the top step of the podium with Ginther's win in the RA272 at the 1965 Mexican Grand Prix. For the new 3.0 L rules from 1966, Honda introduced the Honda RA273. Although the RA273's engine was a well-designed, 360 hp (265 kW) V12, the car was let down by a relatively heavy and unwieldy in-house chassis. Honda returned to the winner's circle in 1967 with the new Honda RA300, driven by John Surtees. This won the 1967 Italian Grand Prix in only its first Formula One race. The RA300 chassis was partly designed by Lola in the UK, and this resulted in the car being nicknamed the Hondola by the motoring press. The team finished fourth in the constructors' championship, despite Surtees being their only driver during the season, while Surtees finished fourth in the drivers' championship.

The following year's Honda RA301 had many reliability problems, but finished on the podium twice and scored a pole position. The team's new Honda RA302 appeared in only a single race at Rouen-Les-Essarts, lasting only a few laps before its fiery crash resulted in the death of driver Jo Schlesser. The death and the want to focus on selling road cars in the United States prompted Honda to withdraw from Formula One at the end of the 1968 season.

== Second era (1983–1992) ==
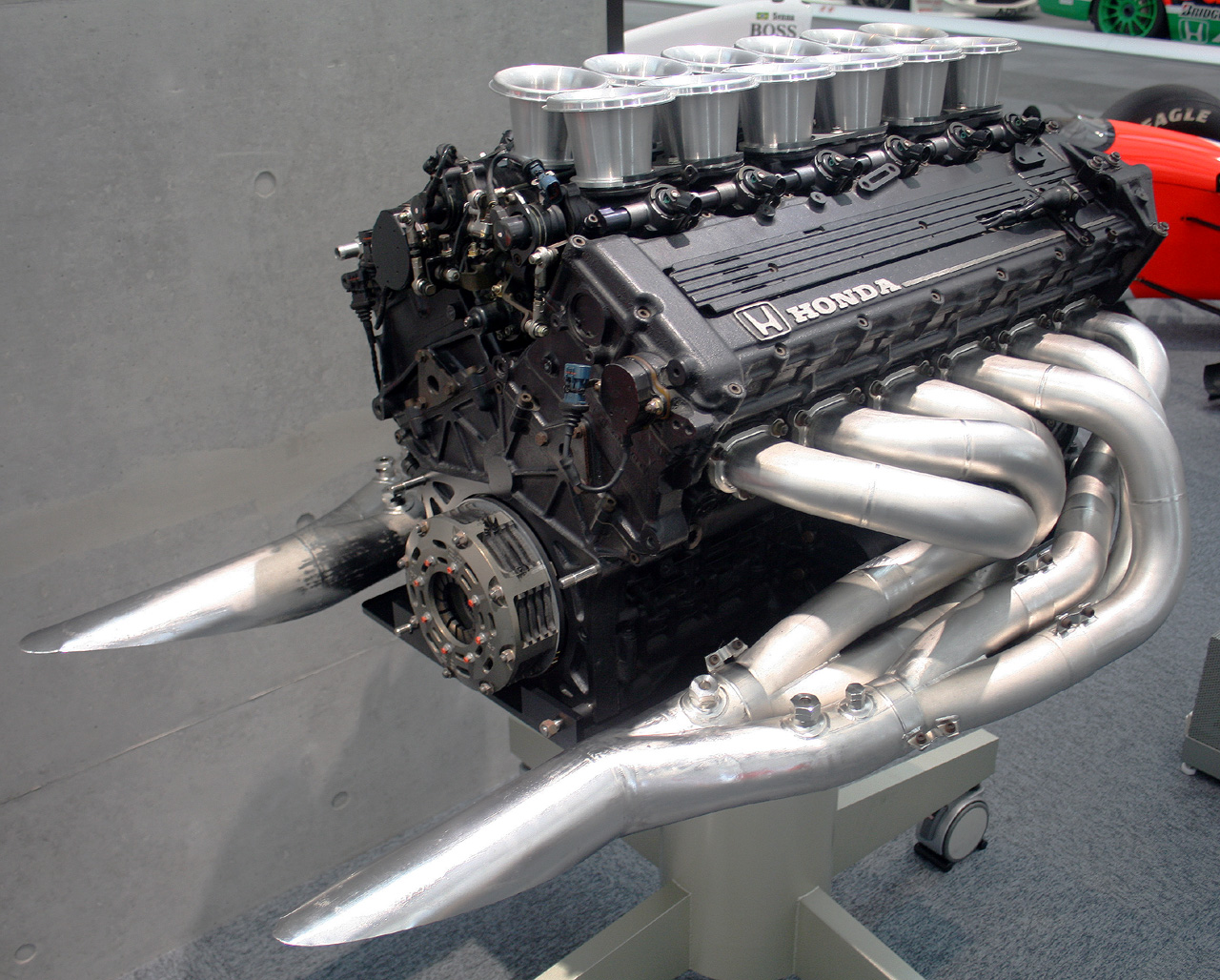
Honda RA121E V12 engine as supplied to McLaren for the 1991 season

Honda returned to Formula One in 1983 as an engine supplier for Spirit and stayed in the sport for a decade, at various times teaming with Williams (1983–87), Lotus (1987–88), McLaren (1988–92) and finally Tyrrell (1991). Though they often supplied their engines to more than one team per season, Honda did not always supply the same specification engines to different teams in the same season. For example, in 1987 as Williams had an existing contract, they were supplied with the latest 1.5-litre RA167E V6 engine, while Lotus were supplied with the 1986 RA166E engine which had to be adapted to a lower fuel limit and turbo boost restriction, thus limiting its effectiveness, though for the last year of the original turbo era in 1988, both Lotus and McLaren used the same specification RA168E. Also, in 1991, while McLaren had the latest RA121E V12, Tyrrell were only given the RA100E V10s that McLaren had used in 1990. McLaren had direct Honda factory support, with engines coming straight from the Japanese company's racing division in Japan; while Tyrrell had to make do with the previous RA100E model (renamed to RA101E) that were tuned by private Honda tuner Mugen; they had little to no direct factory support.

Both Lotus in 1987–88 and Tyrrell in 1991 obtained use of the Honda engines largely due to their agreeing to sign former Honda test driver Satoru Nakajima as one of their team drivers for those seasons.

As an engine supplier, Honda made its World Championship debut with Spirit's Swedish driver Stefan Johansson at the 1983 British Grand Prix at Silverstone. Johansson qualified in an encouraging 14th place (although some 4.5 seconds slower than pole), though he would retire after just 5 laps with fuel problems. Johansson had given the Honda its on track debut earlier in the year at the non-championship 1983 Race of Champions at Brands Hatch (the last non-championship race in F1 history) where despite unreliability, the 1.5-litre turbocharged V6 engine dubbed the RA163E had impressed with its speed. By the final race of the 1983 season in South Africa, Honda had begun its association with Williams where reigning (and outgoing) World Champion Keke Rosberg served notice that the Honda was on the pace by qualifying 6th, only 7/10s slower than the Ferrari of pole winner Patrick Tambay.

Rosberg would give Honda its first win as an engine supplier when he outlasted the field to win the 1984 Dallas Grand Prix and by the end of the 1985 season where Briton Nigel Mansell and Rosberg won the final 3 races of the season (Rosberg had already won that year's Detroit Grand Prix), it was clear that Honda had the engine to beat in Formula One.

At their peak (1986–91) Honda engines were considered the ticket to Grand Prix glory due to their power, reliability, sophistication and winning track record. Honda's commitment to F1 was such that Nigel Mansell, who drove Honda-powered Williams cars from 1985 to 1987 recalled in a 2011 interview that Honda were making and developing 4 to 6 totally different engines in a single season. Honda won six consecutive constructors' championships as an engine manufacturer (two with Williams between 1986 and 1987 and four with McLaren between 1988 and 1991), as well as five consecutive drivers' championships (one by Nelson Piquet in 1987, three by Ayrton Senna in 1988, 1990 and 1991, and one by Alain Prost in 1989), before dropping out of the sport again.

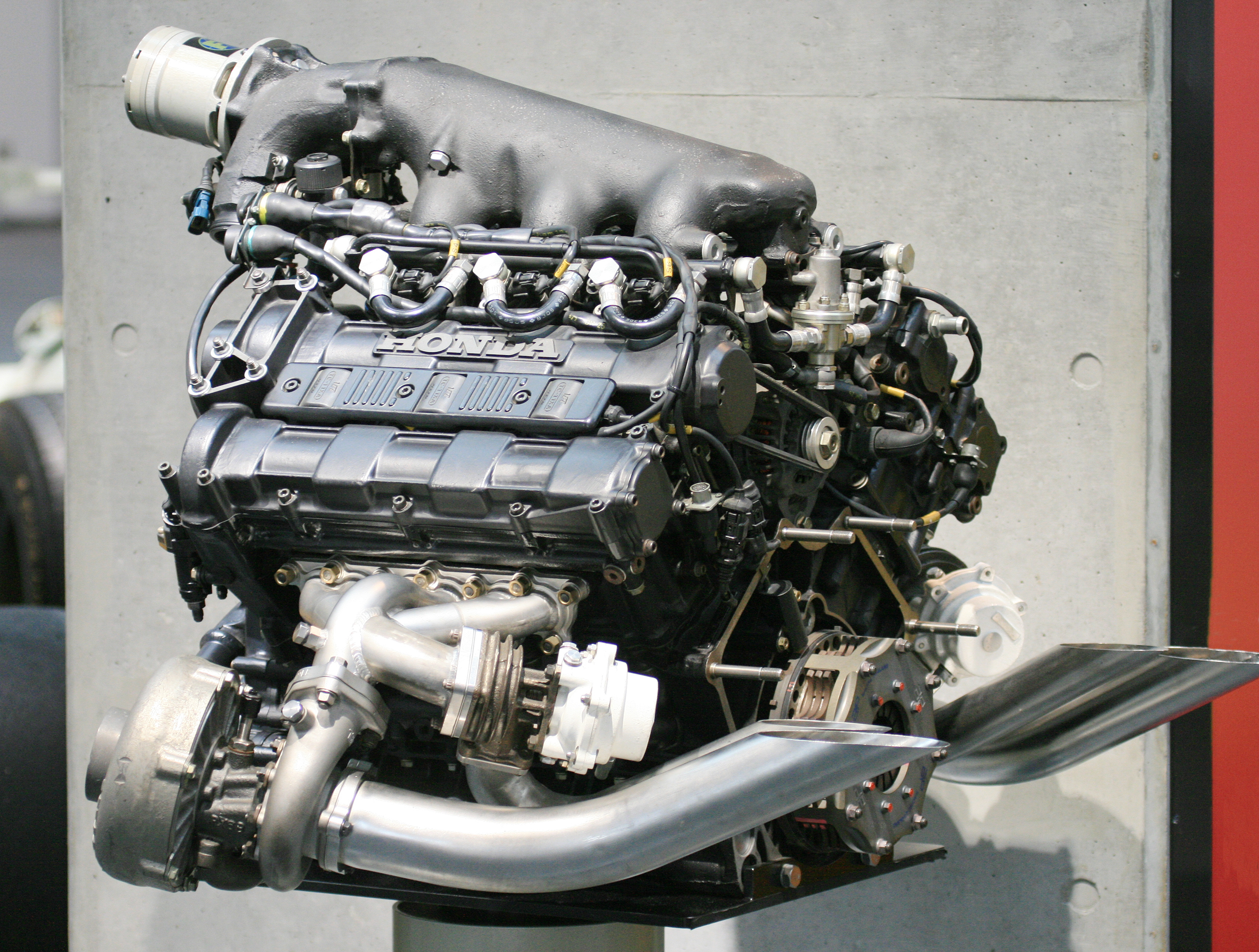
The all-conquering Honda RA168E V6 turbo used in the McLaren MP4/4 and Lotus 100T in 1988

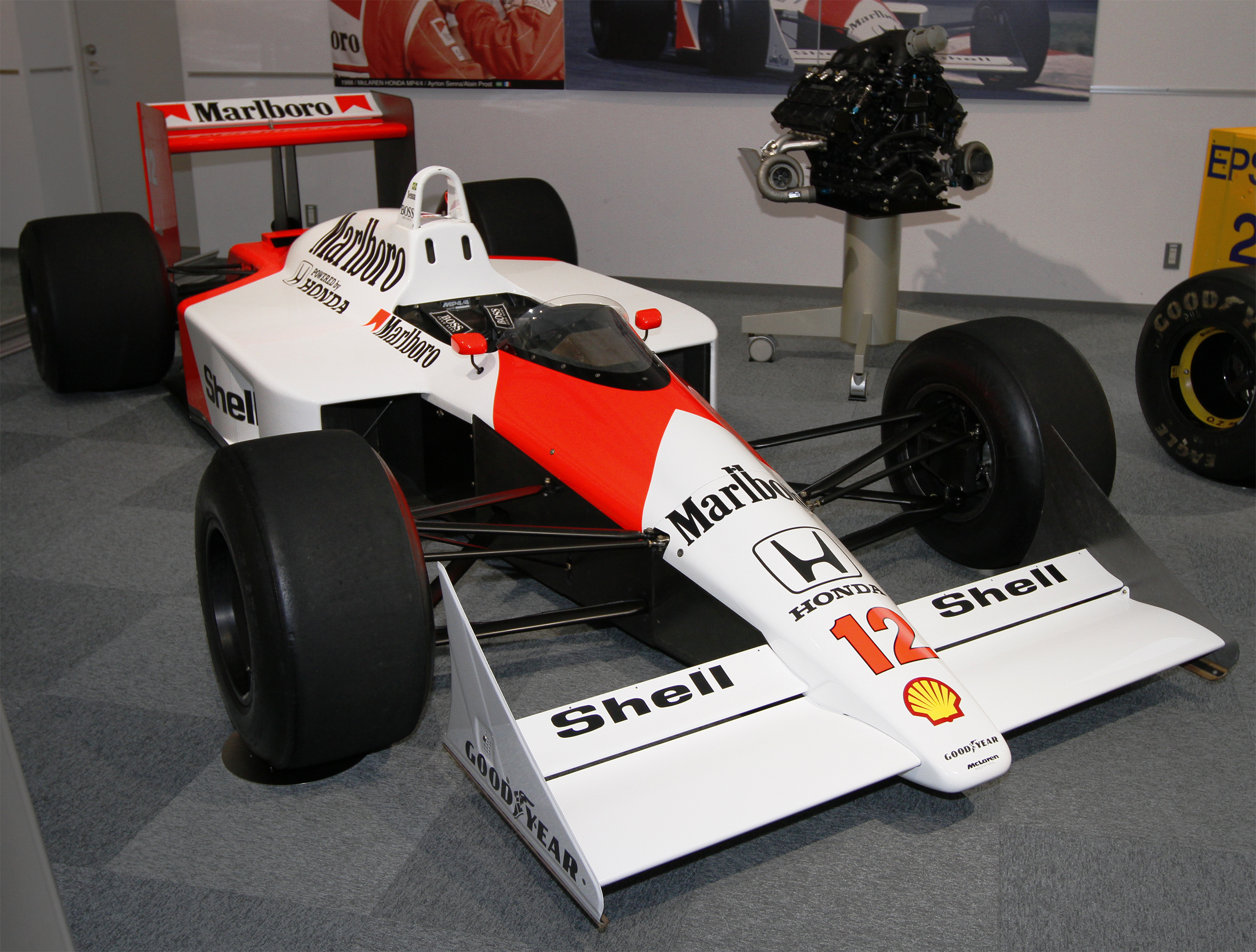
The 1988 McLaren-Honda MP4/4

Honda's supreme year in its days as an engine supplier came with McLaren in 1988. Mated to the Steve Nichols designed McLaren MP4/4 and with then dual World Champion Alain Prost and Brazilian Ayrton Senna as the drivers, the McLaren-Honda duo had an almost perfect season. Unlike most, Honda built an all new V6 turbo (the RA168E) for the year to cope with the reduced fuel limit (150 litres) and turbo boost limit (2.5 BAR, down from 4.0 BAR in 1987) and it paid massive dividends. McLaren-Honda claimed 15 pole positions in the 16 races, 13 of them for Senna, and also claimed 15 race wins, 8 from Senna (a new season record) and 7 from Prost which actually equaled the old record he jointly held with Jim Clark. McLaren-Honda scored a then record 199 points in the Constructors' Championship, a massive 134 points ahead of second placed Ferrari (whose driver Gerhard Berger was the only non-Honda-powered pole winner in Britain and the only non-Honda-powered winner in Italy), while Senna and Prost were the only drivers in contention for the Drivers' Championship ultimately won by Senna. Prost actually scored more points than Senna over the course of the season, largely thanks to 7-second-place finishes to go with his 7 wins, but under the rules of the time only the best 11 scores counted to the championship which saw the title go to the Brazilian.

Fittingly in the last race of Formula One's original turbo era, the 1988 Australian Grand Prix, Honda-powered drivers closed out the podium with Prost defeating Senna with the Lotus of Nelson Piquet finishing an easy 3rd.

For the new 3.5 L naturally aspirated regulations for 1989, Honda debuted the new RA109E V10 in the McLaren MP4/5 and were now exclusively supplying McLaren; Lotus were forced to use Judd engines. This engine proved as dominant as the V6 turbo before it, taking 10 wins and 15 pole positions during the season and powering Prost to the 1989 Drivers' Championship. For 1990, a further developed version of the V10 and the MP4/5B powered Senna to the 1990 Drivers' Championship. For 1991, Honda developed a brand new V12, the RA121E, with which Senna ultimately won his third World Championship. 1992 saw the Adrian Newey designed Williams FW14B chassis to be superior to any other car that season, and McLaren-Honda finished 2nd in the Constructors' Championship. Honda's final win of this era came when Gerhard Berger won the 1992 Australian Grand Prix, the final race of the season. The company had decided to pull out of Formula One after the 1992 season due to the burst of the Japanese asset price bubble that occurred that year.

Honda-powered cars had won 71 Grands Prix by the end of the 1992 season, 69 of them as an engine supplier between 1983 and 1992. Williams had 23 wins (75 races) and Lotus 2 wins (32 races) while McLaren gave the Japanese company 44 wins from 80 starts with the team.

== Interlude: Mugen and aborted 1999 project ==
From 1993 to 1998, Honda's only presence in Formula One was as an engine supplier through its closely related but independent partner, Mugen Motorsports, who supplied engines to Footwork, Lotus, Ligier, Prost and Jordan. Mugen-powered cars had won four Grands Prix by the end of the 1999 season. Although the engines were initially independently funded, the engines were serviced by Honda engineers, and by 1998 the engines themselves were effectively Honda works engines. In 1998, Honda was seriously considering entry in Formula One as a constructor, going as far as hiring Harvey Postlethwaite as technical director and designer and hiring engineer Kyle Petryshen from HRC to help with the design, implementation and management of the new engine in the new chassis. A test car, RA099, designed by Postlethwaite and built by Dallara, was made and tested during 1999, driven by Jos Verstappen. Although the engines were still Mugen-badged, the team impressed at test sessions, beating some more experienced and better financed teams, even if they were mostly in the midfield. At a test of this car, Postlethwaite suffered a fatal heart attack, the project was later shelved and Honda decided to recommit as a full works engine supplier to BAR, starting in 2000.

During this period, Honda engineers also developed several Formula One cars as a side, unofficial project, the Honda RC100/RC-F1 series, initially using V12 engines as used on the McLarens, before switching to Mugen-built V10 engine in the project's final evolution.

== Third era (2000–2008) ==
=== Return as a works engine manufacturer (2000–2005) ===
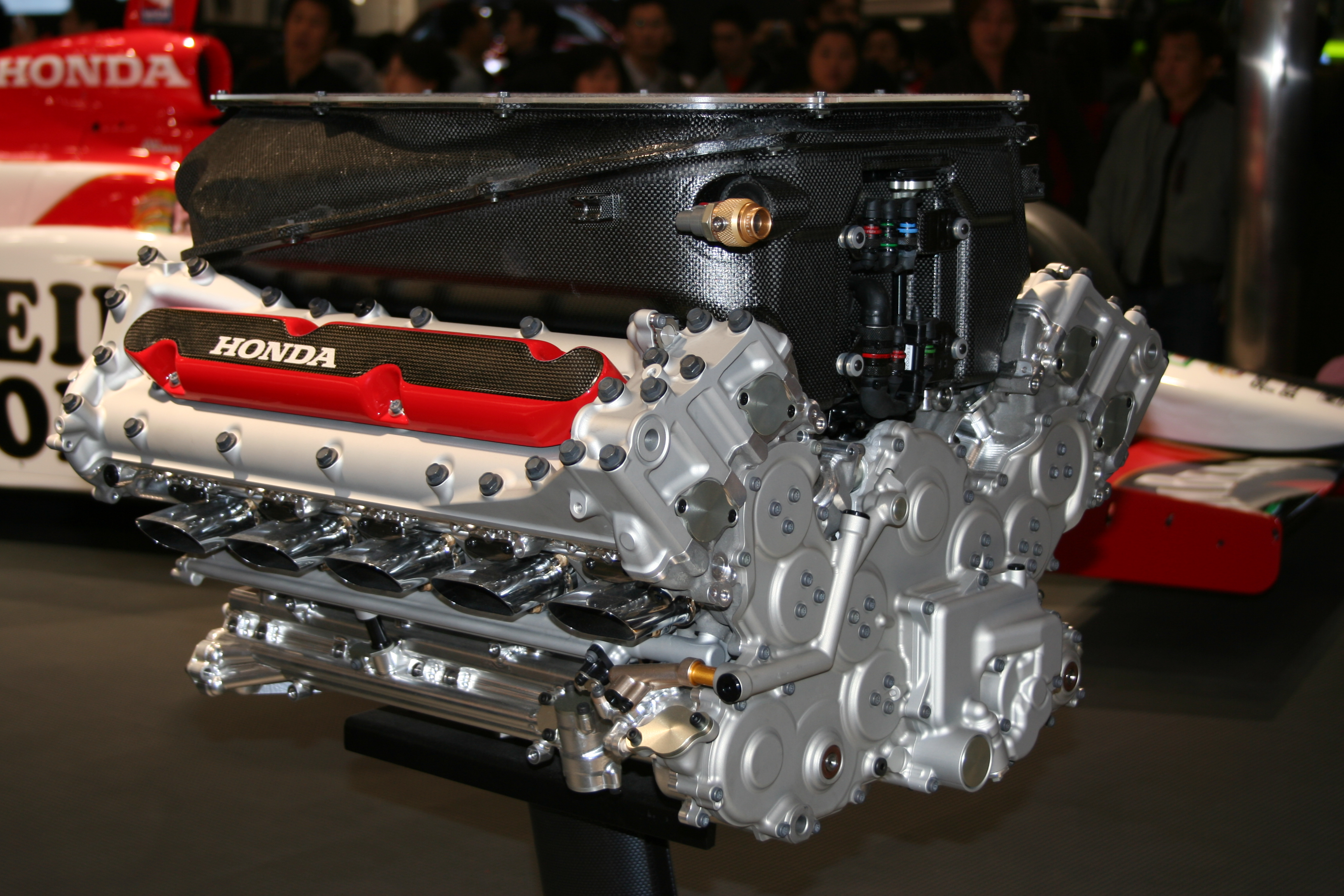
Honda RA005E Engine as supplied to BAR for 2005

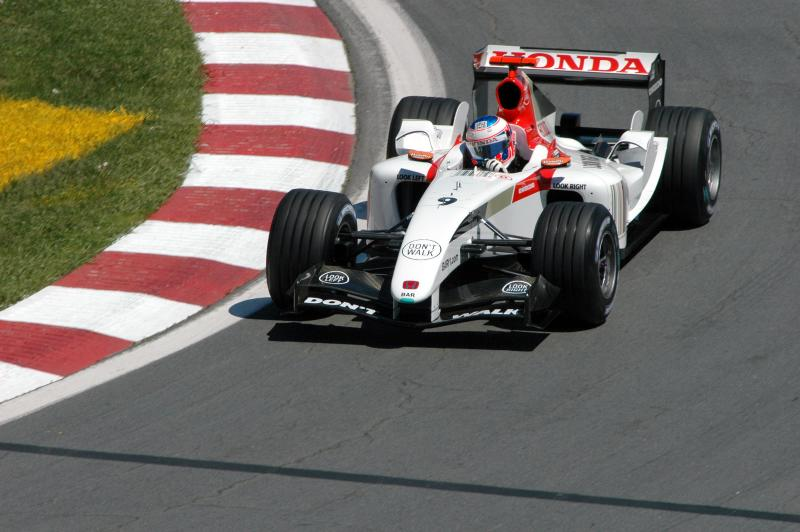
Jenson Button driving the 006 at the 2004 Canadian GP

Honda returned yet again in 2000, providing free engines and factory support for BAR. They also supplied free factory engines to Jordan Grand Prix for 2001 and 2002 seasons. This would lead to a battle for the right to use the Honda engines in the long term. In 2003, despite their better showing in the previous two seasons, Honda dropped the Jordan Grand Prix partnership in order to concentrate on the BAR partnership. In mid-November 2004 Honda was going to purchase 45% of the BAR team from British American Tobacco (BAT, the founder and owner of BAR) but had to be delayed to January 2005 due to issues with minor shareholders, following BAR's best season, when they were able to achieve second place in the 2004 Constructors' Championship, only behind the dominant World Champions Michael Schumacher and Ferrari.

=== Full team ownership (2006–2008) ===
The logo used by Honda from 2006 to 2008

In September 2005 Honda purchased the remaining 55% share of BAR to become the sole owner. BAT continued as title sponsor with the Lucky Strike brand in 2006, but withdrew from Formula 1 for 2007 due to prohibition of tobacco advertising. It was decided that the team, holding a Japanese racing licence, would race under the name Honda Racing F1 Team from 2006.

==== 2006 season ====
Honda's first season as a team since 1968 started fairly well, with Jenson Button finishing fourth at the season-opening Bahrain Grand Prix and scoring a podium at the second round in Malaysia. At the next race in Australia, Button scored a pole position. The results started to be inconsistent after that and the main reason for the lack of form was reliability, with the team dropping out of contention for race victories many times. Pit-stop problems also hampered the team early on, in one case effectively ruining Jenson Button's chances for a good result and possible podium at Imola. In light of this form, it was announced that Geoff Willis would be adopting a factory-based role to concentrate on aerodynamics. Following the appointment of Senior Technical Director Shuhei Nakamoto over Willis' head and Mariano Alperin-Bruvera as Chief Aerodynamicist Willis' position appeared difficult, and reports indicated that he left the team.

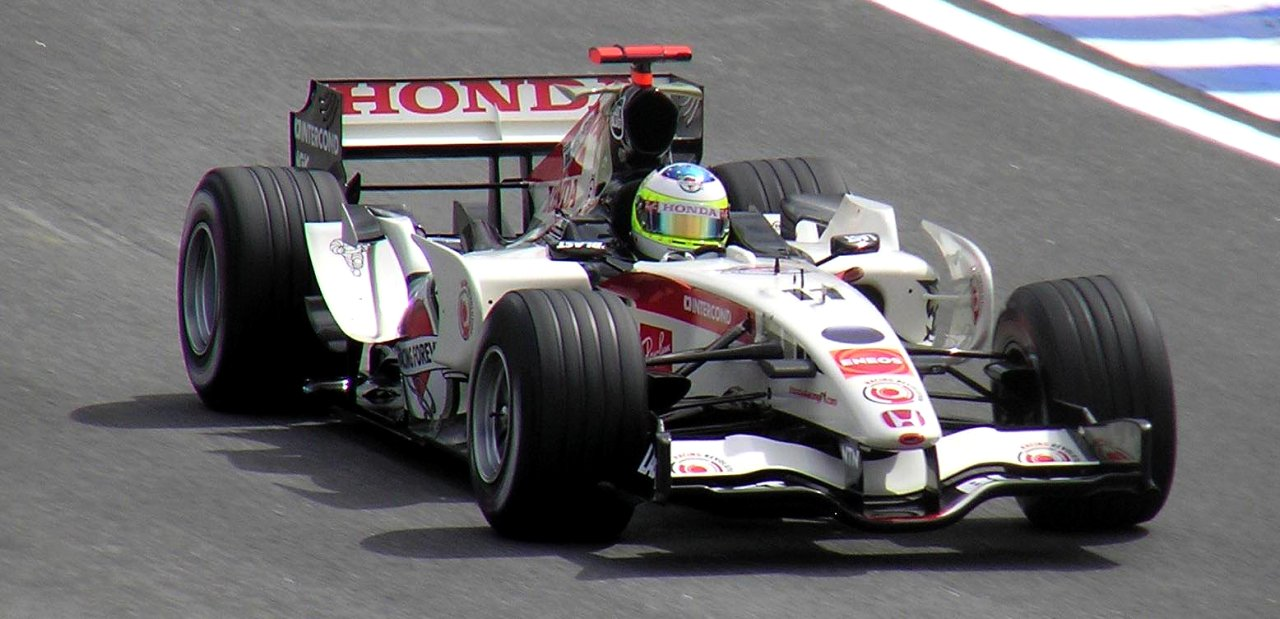
Rubens Barrichello driving for Honda at the 2006 Brazilian GP

At the Hungaroring, fortunes changed. Rubens Barrichello and Jenson Button qualified third and fourth, though Button had to drop ten places, following an engine change. In an incident-packed race, Button came from fourteenth on the grid to win his first race, with Barrichello finishing fourth. After this win, the team's performance went up noticeably, displaying consistency arguably better than championship leaders Ferrari and Renault. Since Hungary, Button scored more points than any other driver in the last six races of the season. Barrichello did not have the best season for the team, because he had to get used to the new brakes and traction control, after moving from a six-year stint at Ferrari, though he was a regular points scorer. Both drivers earned points finishes in almost all the remaining races, with the season ending on a high note with Button's 3rd-place finish in Brazil – less than a second behind 2nd place Fernando Alonso – after having to start from 14th on the grid. The team finished fourth in the constructors' championship with 86 points.

On 15 November 2006, it was announced that long-time BAR Honda and Honda test driver Anthony Davidson would be heading to Super Aguri F1 to race alongside Takuma Sato. He was replaced by ex-Red Bull Racing driver Christian Klien for the 2007 season.

==== 2007 season ====
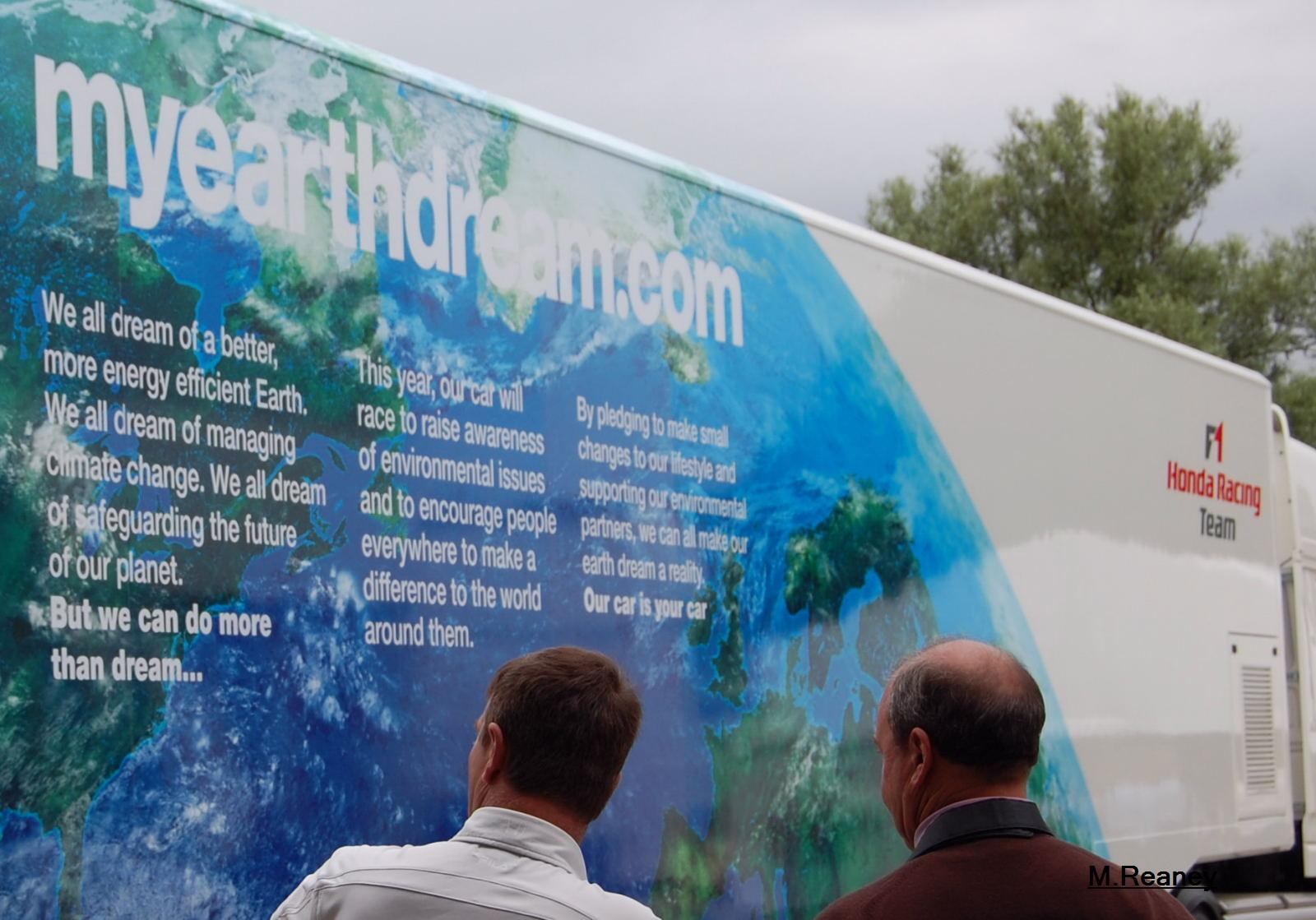
Earthdreams livery on Honda's trucks

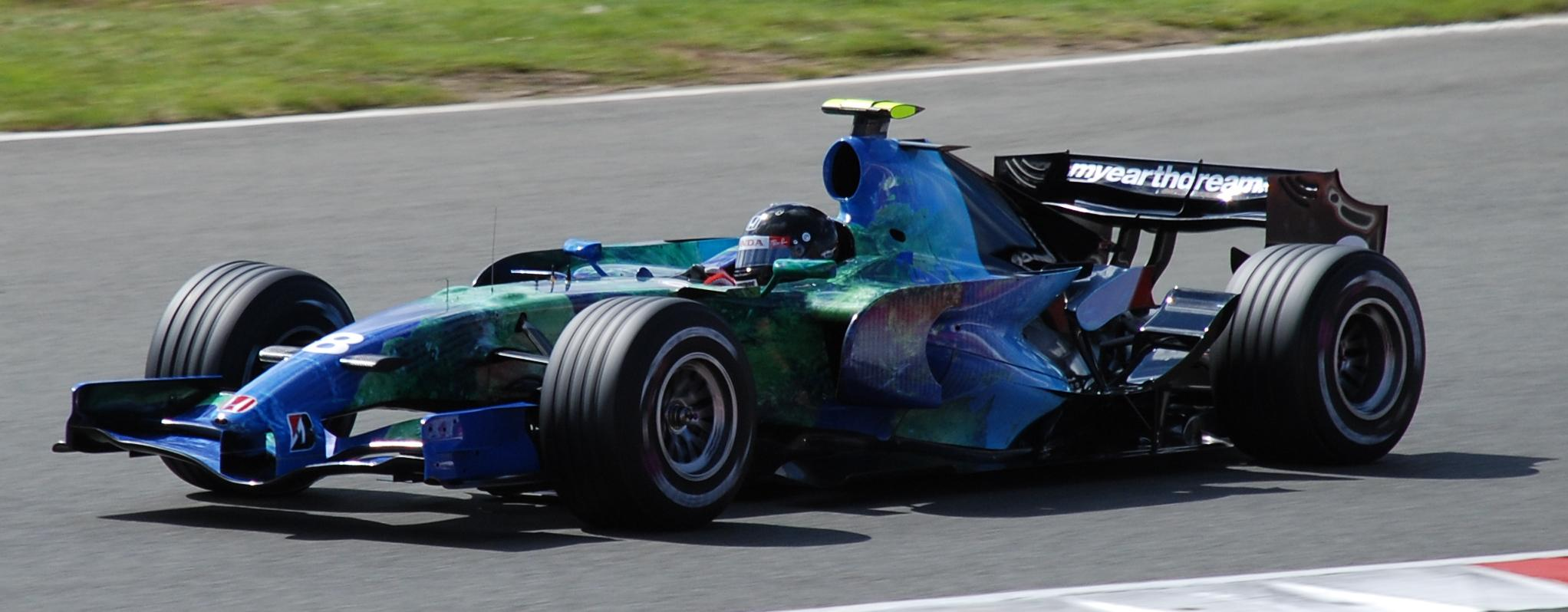
Rubens Barrichello driving the Honda RA107 at the 2007 British Grand Prix

With the ban on tobacco sponsorship in Formula One taking effect, 2007 also saw the end of British American Tobacco's sponsorship of Honda. A new livery was unveiled on 26 February 2007 on the RA107 car, depicting planet Earth against a black background of space. On the rear wing was the web address of environmental awareness website myearthdream.com, which was launched on 27 February 2007, immediately following the official launch of the 2007 car. Reactions to the new livery were mixed, although Honda won an environmental award for their "Earth Car" campaign at the end of the year.

The RA107 was the first Formula One car designed under former HRC motorcycle designer, Shuhei Nakamoto. The team's form in pre-season testing was patchy, and Jenson Button urged the squad to improve. The car's sheer lack of pace was evident at the season-opening Australian Grand Prix in Melbourne on 18 March, with Button and Barrichello qualifying 14th and 17th respectively (well behind the "satellite" Super Aguri team, whose car is effectively an update of the previous year's Honda, the RA106). Barrichello finished the race in 11th place, with Button in 15th after receiving a drive-through penalty for speeding in the pit lane. The team also failed to score points in the four subsequent races, their best finish being 10th in Spain and Monaco, scored both times by Rubens Barrichello. Honda finally scored a point in the French Grand Prix, courtesy of Button's eighth-place finish. The team eventually finished 8th in the constructors' championship, with a best result of 5th at the Chinese Grand Prix, courtesy of Button.

From July 2007, recognising the aerodynamic problems within the car, Honda began to recruit a new team from across the Formula 1 paddock. Chief aerodynamicist Loic Bigois and assistant Francois Martinet were signed from WilliamsF1; Jörg Zander and John Owen from BMW Sauber either later in 2007 or early in 2008.

==== 2008 season ====
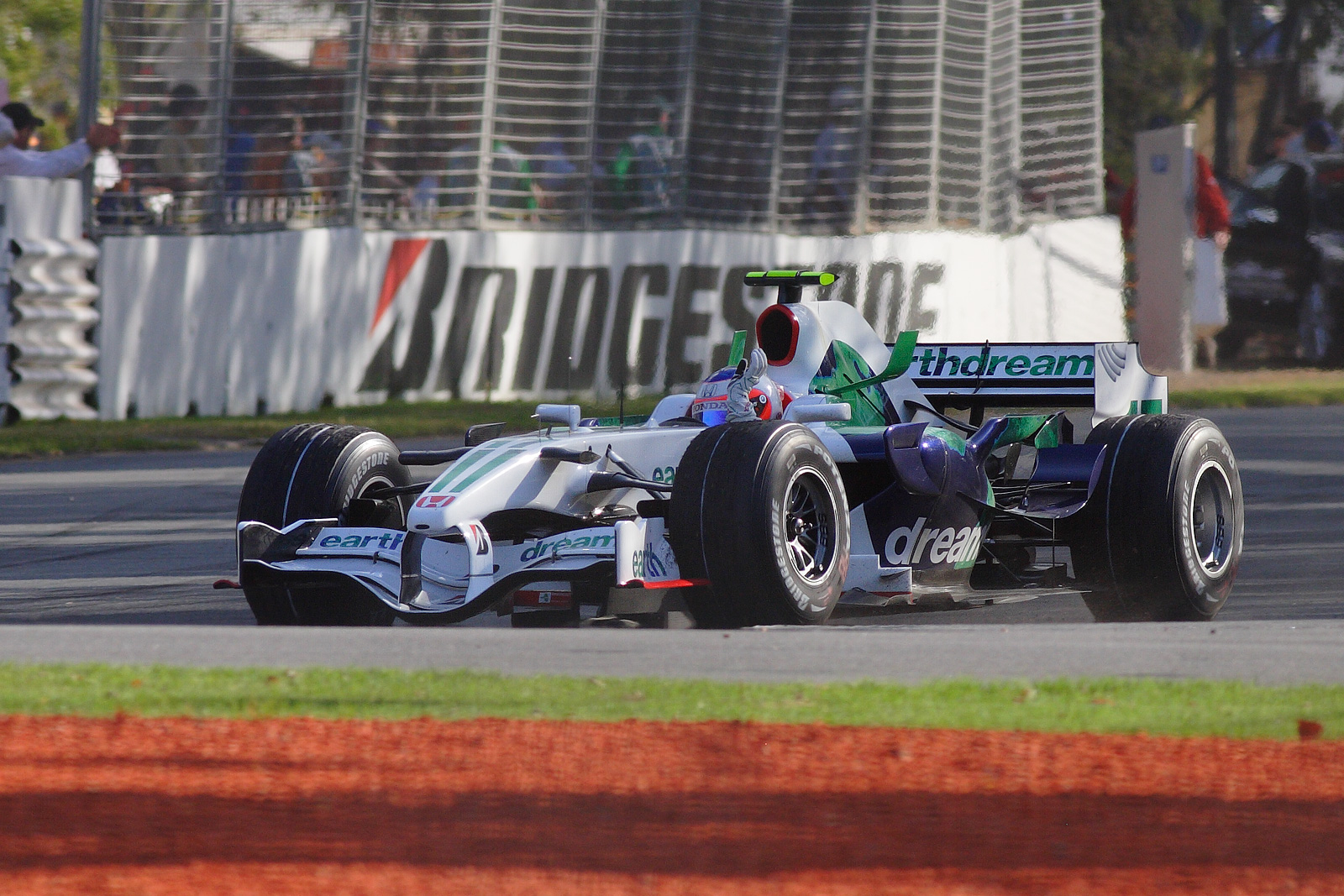
Rubens Barrichello driving the Honda RA108 at the 2008 Australian Grand Prix

On 19 July 2007, it was announced that Barrichello and Button would continue the factory effort as teammates into 2008. On 12 November 2007, autosport.com confirmed that former Ferrari technical director Ross Brawn was to join Honda as team principal. Nick Fry remained with the team as Chief Executive. On 10 January 2008, it was announced that Alexander Wurz had signed as test driver for the 2008 season. On 29 January 2008, Honda launched their 2008 race car. The "Earth Car" had a slightly different livery from its 2007 counterpart, with only part of the car containing the earth picture, and the rest with Honda's classic white paint. Button, Barrichello and Wurz were present at the launch.

Honda had another disappointing year, and by mid-season they had switched development to the 2009 season, where new regulations come into play. Despite this, Barrichello managed a podium in the wet British Grand Prix with an inspired choice to full wet weather tyres at the right moment.

==== Sale and formation of Brawn GP ====
Honda suddenly exited the sport at the end of the 2008 season, unwilling to continue the Brackley-based team's $300 million budget and staff of 700 during the 2008 financial crisis. The team continued to work on the Honda RA109 for the 2009 season while Honda attempted to sell the racing team. A number of potential owners were linked to the team, including Prodrive boss David Richards, Mexican businessman Carlos Slim, and the Virgin Group.

The team was eventually saved by a management buy-out led by team principal Ross Brawn and chief executive Nick Fry, and entered the 2009 season as Brawn GP. The team retained Jenson Button and Rubens Barrichello as drivers, with engines supplied by Mercedes. Honda stated it would continue to provide financial support during the team's first year, and the Virgin Group who were linked to purchasing the team, would sponsor the cars throughout the season. Brawn won the overall title in what was its only season before it was then bought out by Mercedes to become their works team from 2010 onwards.

== Fourth era (2015–2021) ==
=== Return as a power unit supplier to McLaren (2015–2017) ===
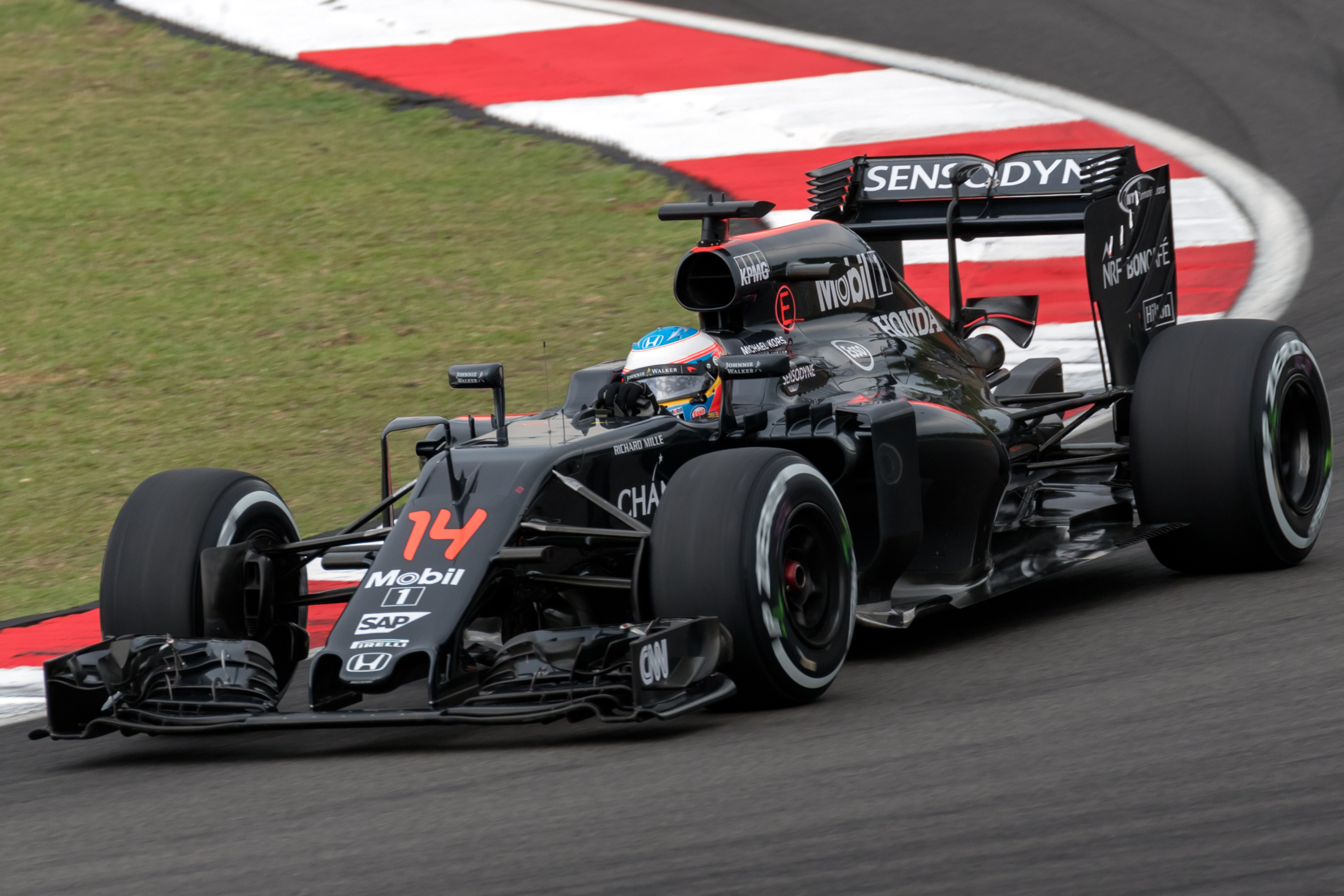
Fernando Alonso driving the McLaren-Honda MP4-31 in 2016

On 7 October 2010, AutoWeek reported that then-CEO Takanobu Ito initiated Honda's initial ambitions of Formula One return plan as a full-scale engine manufacturer competitor was eyed as a part of Honda's ambitions of the future Formula One all-new engine regulations which initially planned for 2013 but later postponed to 2014 season to foster the green image and eco-friendly philosophy. Later on 20 November 2011 Motorsport.com reported that Honda's further plan of Formula One return was revealed, with McLaren was hinted as their main partnership target but on 23 November 2011 Jonathan Neale denied the reports of future reunion plan. On 26 February 2013, GrandPrix.com reported that Honda claimed that the future Formula One engine project development work was started as a part of Honda's "Green Image" goals with former Ferrari head of engine department Gilles Simon signed as an engine consultant. Later on 16 May 2013 it was announced that Honda returned to Formula One as an engine supplier in 2015 for the second season of the V6 turbo-hybrid regulations, reviving their relationship with 1980s and 1990s partner McLaren that included free engines and also commercial, factory support and official second team vehicles. Honda's power unit was designed around McLaren's very tight chassis design and aerodynamic requirements, which they had dubbed their "size zero" philosophy. Over the 2015 season, the McLaren-Honda package proved to be significantly underpowered and unreliable, and the team finished ninth in the constructors' championship with fifth place in Hungary as their best result. Reasons for the lacklustre performance included Honda lacking experience and data with the new regulations, a token system limiting development, as well as fundamental issues with McLaren's "size zero" chassis concept. McLaren had also persuaded Honda to return a year earlier than initially planned.

For the 2016 season, Yusuke Hasegawa replaced Yasuhisa Arai as Honda's project leader. Honda had made significant improvements for the season, and after just the sixth race of the season, the Monaco Grand Prix, the team had scored 24 points, three points shy of the previous season's full total. The team scored points in 13 different races during the season and recorded fastest lap at the Italian Grand Prix, finishing in sixth place in the final constructors' standings with 76 points, a marked improvement from the year before. In September 2016, Hasegawa revealed that Honda had a separate team already working on next year's engine.

For the 2017 season, Honda redesigned the entire power unit, with the major change being the positioning of the turbo, compressor and MGU-H. This design split the turbo from the compressor and had them overhanging each side of the block with the MGU-H in the centre of the V all connected via a shaft. Honda confessed that the new design was "high risk" and it would take time to reach its potential, but will ultimately give higher performance. The season started with several reliability issues, and it took until the eighth round in Azerbaijan to score points. However, the team regularly finished in the points in the latter part of the season, scoring points in six of the last ten races, to finish ninth in the constructors' championship. The relationship between McLaren and Honda had soured, and in September 2017 the two announced that they would split at the end of 2017.

=== Partnership with Red Bull-owned teams (2018–2021) ===
==== 2018: Toro Rosso ====
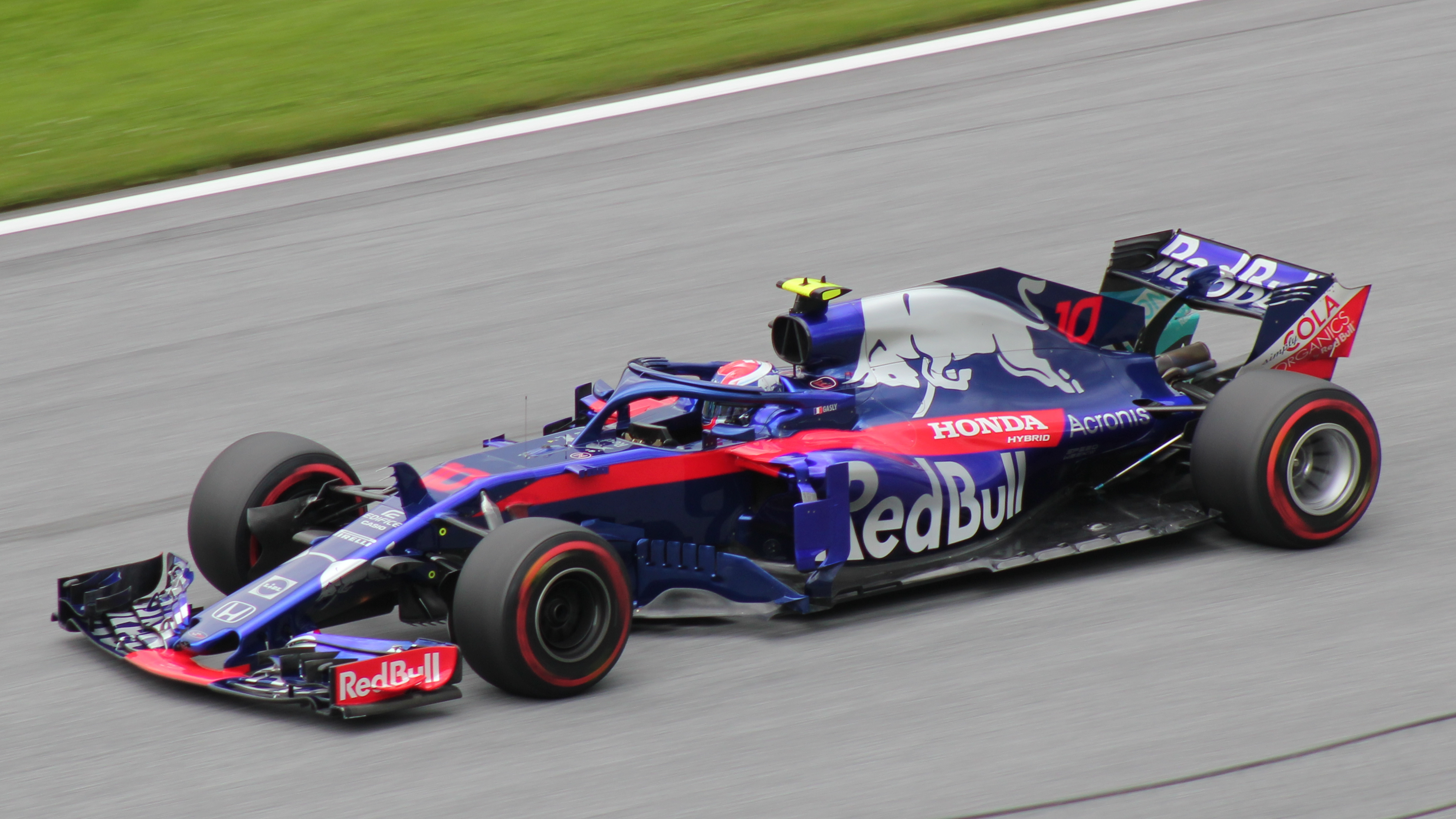
Pierre Gasly at the 2018 Austrian Grand Prix

In September 2017, it was announced that Honda would be the works engine partner to Toro Rosso for the 2018 season, with previous partner McLaren switching to customer Renault units. From 2018 onwards, Honda split the responsibilities of project leader in two, with Toyoharu Tanabe taking charge of trackside operations and Yasuaki Asaki leading development in Japan. In addition, Honda would also provide full trackside factory support, brand endorsements, free engines and official vehicles to Scuderia Toro Rosso. Honda's 2018 power unit, the RA618H, was a more mature variant of the architecture introduced in 2017, while Toro Rosso were more relaxed on the PU dimension requirements than McLaren. The power unit proved to be significantly more reliable compared to the previous year, with only three engine-related retirements throughout the season. In just the second race of the season in Bahrain, the team finished in fourth place with Pierre Gasly, Honda's best result since returning to the sport in 2015. At the seventh round in Canada, Honda debuted their upgraded Spec 2 unit, and after assessing the competitiveness of Honda compared to Renault, senior team Red Bull Racing announced they would switch to full-works Honda from 2019 onwards. Honda then focused the rest of the year on gaining experience for 2019, thus often changing engines despite receiving grid penalties. The introduction of the Spec 3 power unit brought notable performance improvements, yielding sixth and seventh places in qualifying for the Japanese Grand Prix. The team finished the season ninth in the constructors' standings with eight points finishes.

==== 2019: Red Bull and Toro Rosso ====
Honda entered the 2019 season powering both Red Bull Racing and Toro Rosso, meaning that they would be engine partner to multiple teams for the first time since 2008 and also for the third time since 2017 that two Red Bull-owned teams supplied by same engine manufacturer again but this time with Honda. Honda and Red Bull aimed to work closely together to allow for perfect synergy between chassis and power unit, which would provide a significant packaging advantage. 2019 was targeted as a building year for World Championship contention in future seasons.

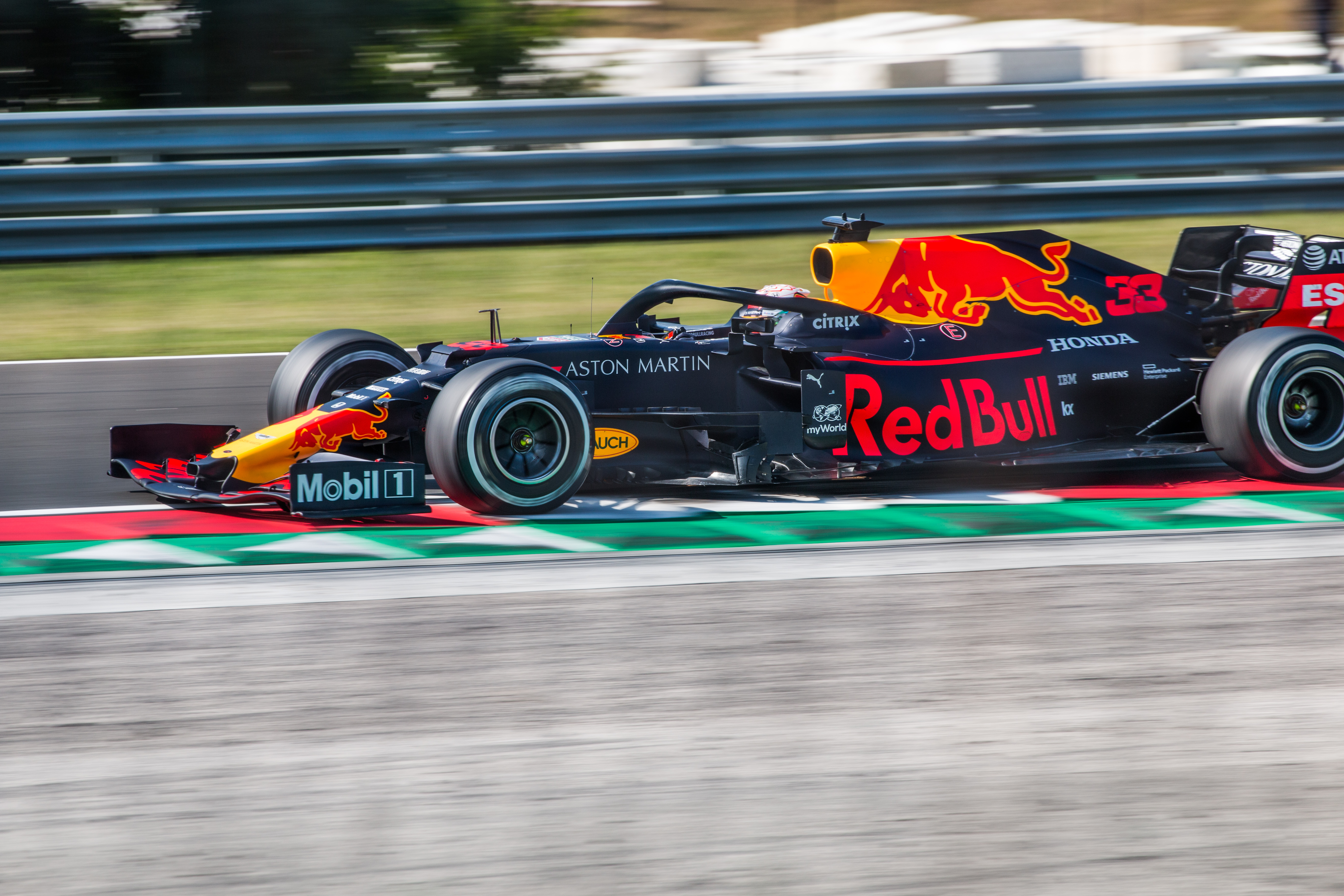
Max Verstappen scored his first pole position at the 2019 Hungarian Grand Prix.

At the season-opening Australian Grand Prix, Red Bull-Honda driver Max Verstappen took third place, Honda's first podium since returning to Formula One in 2015 and their first overall since 2008, as well as Red Bull's best season-opening result in the turbo-hybrid era. The following seven rounds saw Verstappen finish six times in the top-four, including a podium in Spain. Honda brought a reliability-enhancing Spec 2 upgrade for the fourth race in Azerbaijan, and just four races later in France they introduced a performance-increasing Spec 3 unit. At the following Austrian Grand Prix, Honda was able to optimise the level of engine cooling required, and Verstappen won the race to give Honda their first win in the V6 turbo-hybrid era, and their first win overall since Jenson Button won the 2006 Hungarian Grand Prix. Another win followed two races later in the wet German Grand Prix, where Verstappen won and Toro Rosso's Daniil Kvyat came third to make it a double podium for Honda. At the next race, the Hungarian Grand Prix, Verstappen took his first ever pole position and Honda's first since the 2006 Australian Grand Prix.

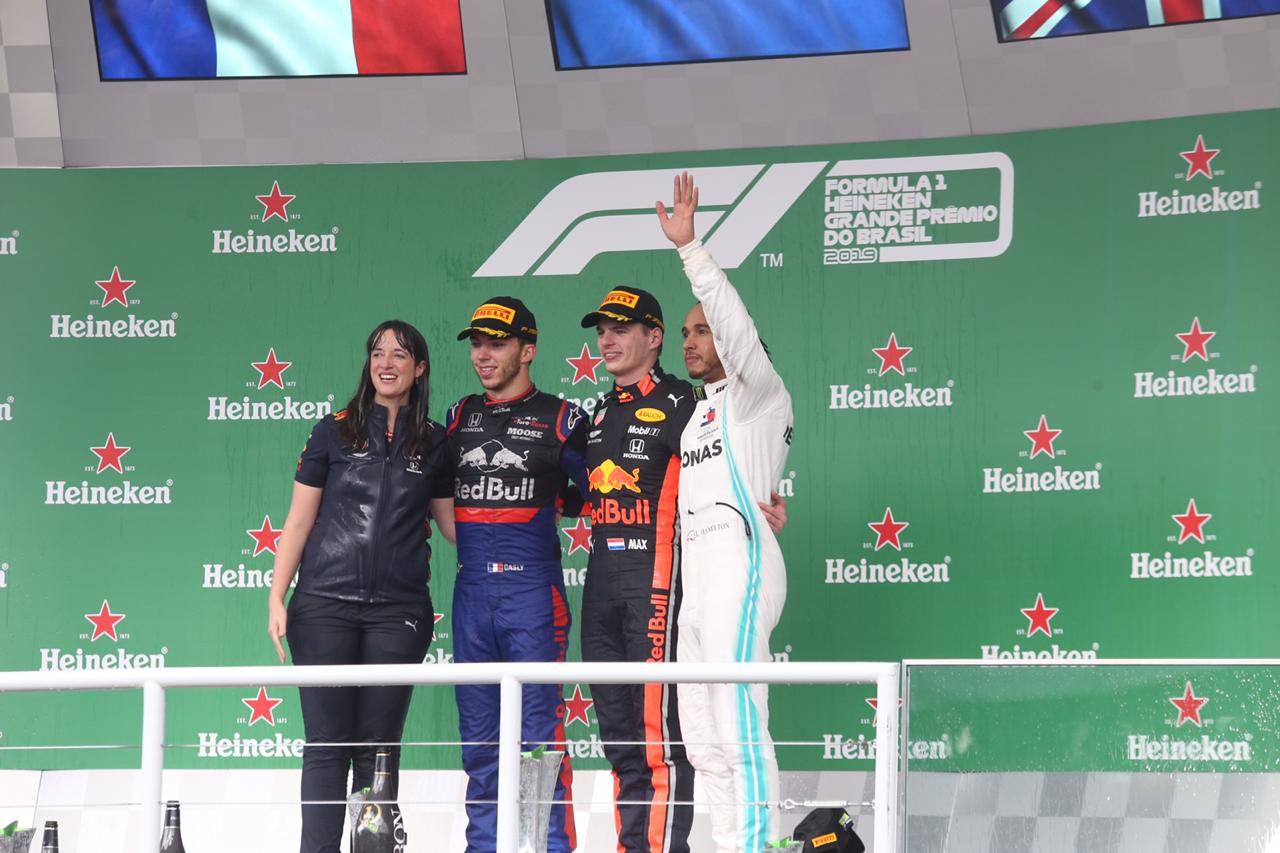
The 2019 Brazilian GP was Honda's first 1–2 finish since the 1991 Japanese GP.

At the thirteenth round in Belgium, Honda introduced its Spec 4 power unit, which proved to be another step up in performance. Grid penalties hampered their races in Belgium and Italy, but the following seven races saw Honda-powered drivers score five podiums, with Honda's performance being particularly strong at the high-altitude tracks of Mexico and Brazil due to a compact turbocharger design. In Brazil, Verstappen won from pole position, while Pierre Gasly in his Toro Rosso-Honda beat Lewis Hamilton's Mercedes for second place in a straight drag to the finish line, scoring Honda's first 1–2 finish since the 1991 Japanese Grand Prix. Verstappen finished the 2019 season third in the championship for the first time in his career. Red Bull finished third in the constructors' standings, while Toro Rosso had their most successful season with two podiums and sixth place in the constructors' championship. Honda finished the season with the fewest on track failures of all four manufacturers by a noticeable margin and no retirements caused by engine failures in the entire season.

==== 2020–2021: Red Bull and AlphaTauri ====
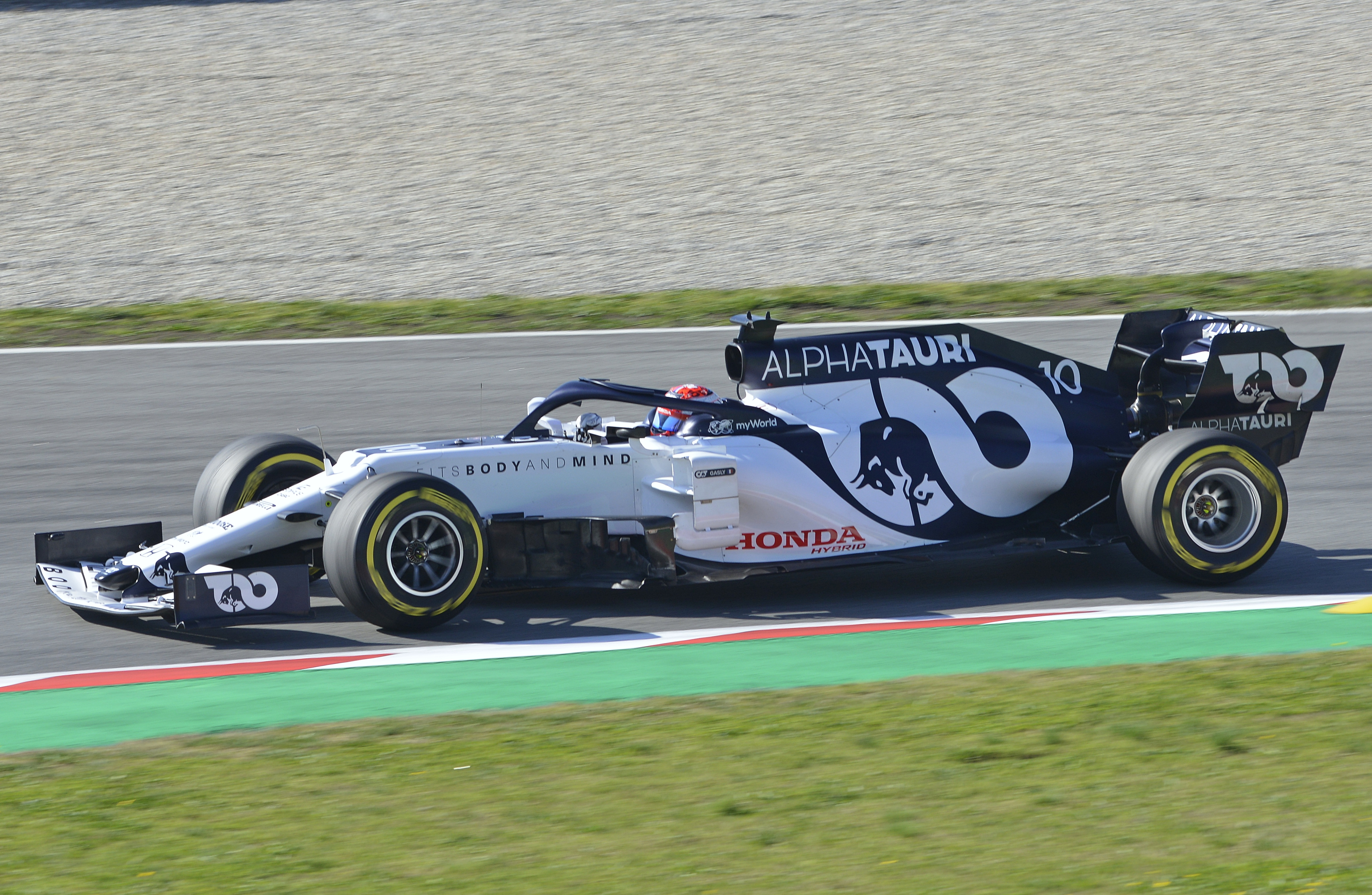
Pierre Gasly won the 2020 Italian Grand Prix with the Honda-powered AlphaTauri AT01.

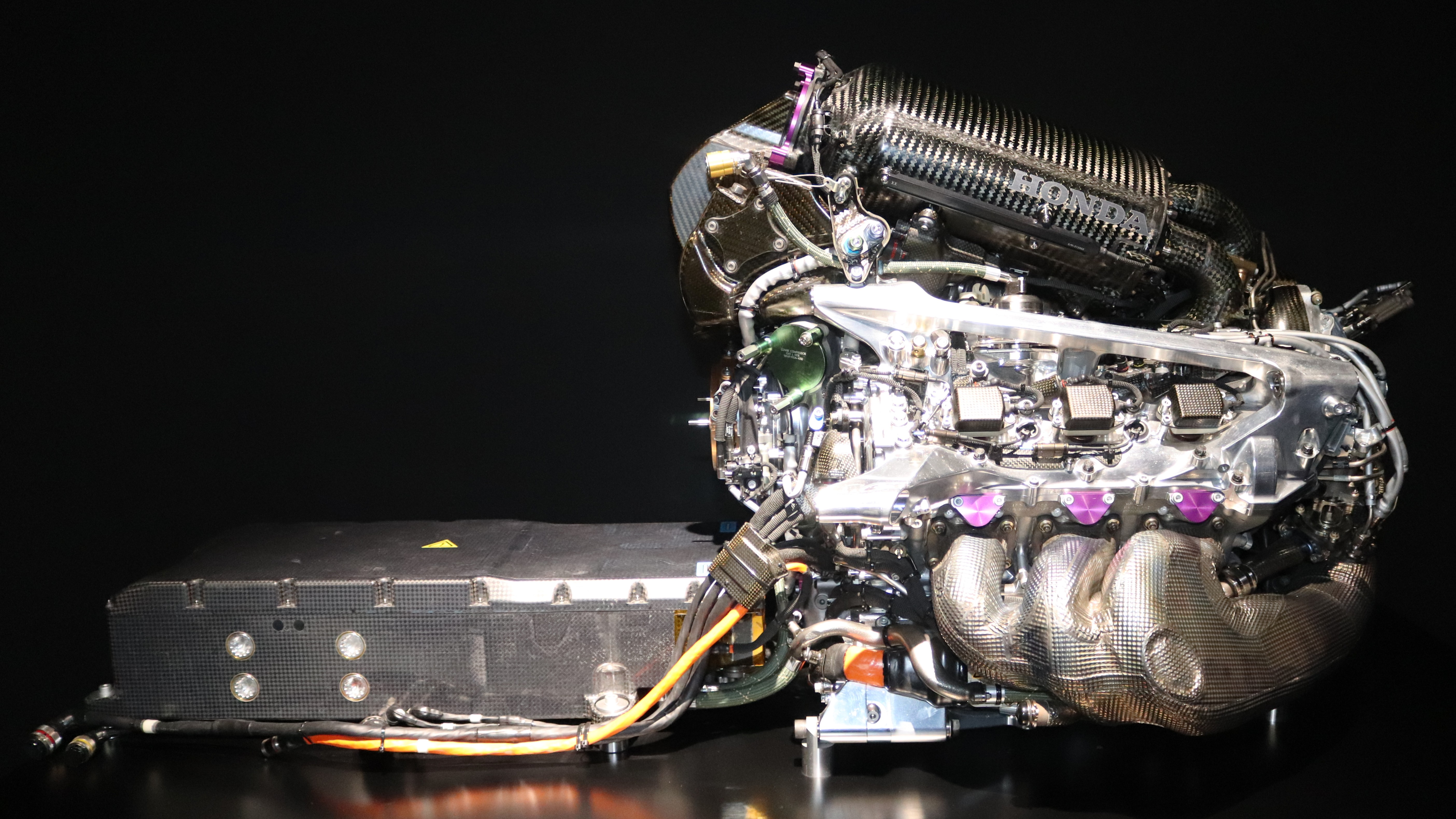
The Honda RA621H power unit that powered Max Verstappen to the 2021 World Championship

For 2020, the Honda-powered Toro Rosso team was rebranded as AlphaTauri to promote the AlphaTauri fashion brand. The season was impacted by the COVID-19 pandemic, with one effect being a prohibition of mid-season power unit upgrades to reduce costs. During the 2020 season, the Red Bull-Honda package proved to be markedly the second fastest, with rival manufacturer Ferrari falling down the order following investigation into the legality of their power unit, while deficits on both chassis and power unit left them behind Mercedes. From the second round of the season in Styria to the seventh round in Belgium, Verstappen scored five consecutive podiums, including a win at the 70th Anniversary Grand Prix at Silverstone. The eighth round, the Italian Grand Prix, saw AlphaTauri's Pierre Gasly achieve his first Formula One victory; he took the lead of the race following a red flag period and managed to retain it to the finish. This made Honda the first engine manufacturer to win with multiple different teams in the V6 turbo-hybrid era. The next race in Mugello yielded a maiden podium for Alex Albon of Red Bull, after which Verstappen scored three straight podiums, bringing Honda's consecutive podium streak up to 11. The last five races of the year brought a double podium for Red Bull in Bahrain and a win from pole position for Verstappen at the season finale in Abu Dhabi. Verstappen was again the leading Honda-powered driver in the championship in third, while Red Bull and AlphaTauri were second and seventh, respectively, in the constructors' standings. Honda was the only power unit manufacturer other than Mercedes to win races or pole positions during the season.

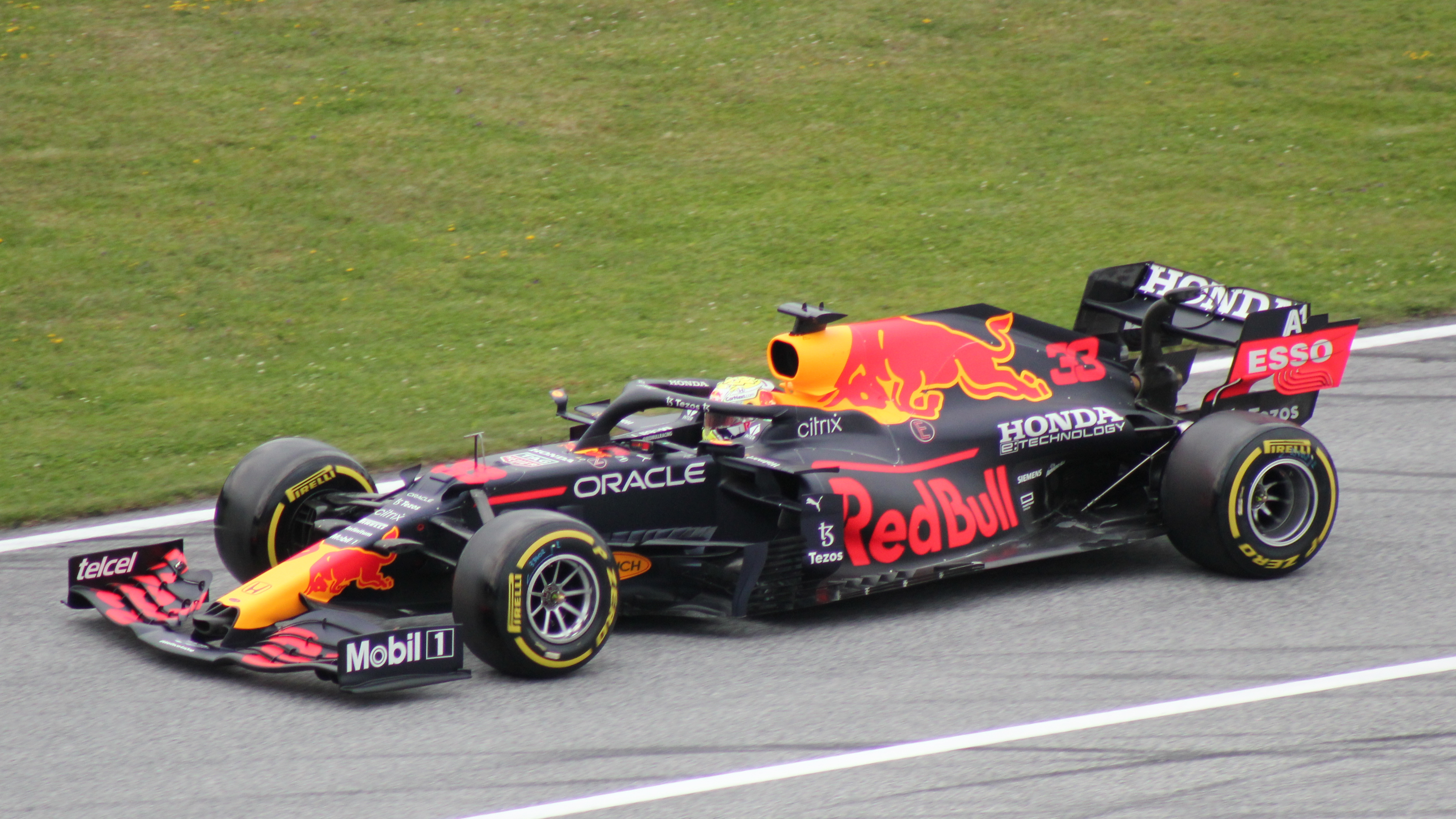
Verstappen won the 2021 title driving the Red Bull-Honda RB16B.

In October 2020, Honda announced they would withdraw from Formula One at the end of the 2021 season, citing their need to focus resources on next-generation road vehicle technologies to make necessary strides towards carbon neutrality. Honda was still committed to winning the championship in 2021, and as a result it brought forward an all-new power unit design that was previously planned for 2022. The RA621H, Honda's 2021 power unit, was significantly better performing, more reliable and more compact than the RA620H of 2020. It proved highly competitive against main rival Mercedes on power, often having superior energy recovery and deployment, while having stronger reliability and smaller dimensions. This paid dividends, as Verstappen took pole position at the season-opening Bahrain Grand Prix and finished a close second, before winning the following Emilia Romagna Grand Prix to establish himself as a title contender against Lewis Hamilton of Mercedes. He finished second in the next two races, before a win at the Monaco Grand Prix saw him take the lead of the championship. He was on course to win again in Azerbaijan until a late tyre blowout took him out, but as Hamilton failed to score following a mistake, Verstappen maintained the championship lead. Red Bull's other driver, Sergio Pérez, claimed the win as AlphaTauri's Gasly finished third to complete a double podium for Honda. Verstappen extended his lead by winning the following French, Styrian and Austrian Grands Prix – each of them from pole position – marking the first time Honda had won five consecutive races since 1988.

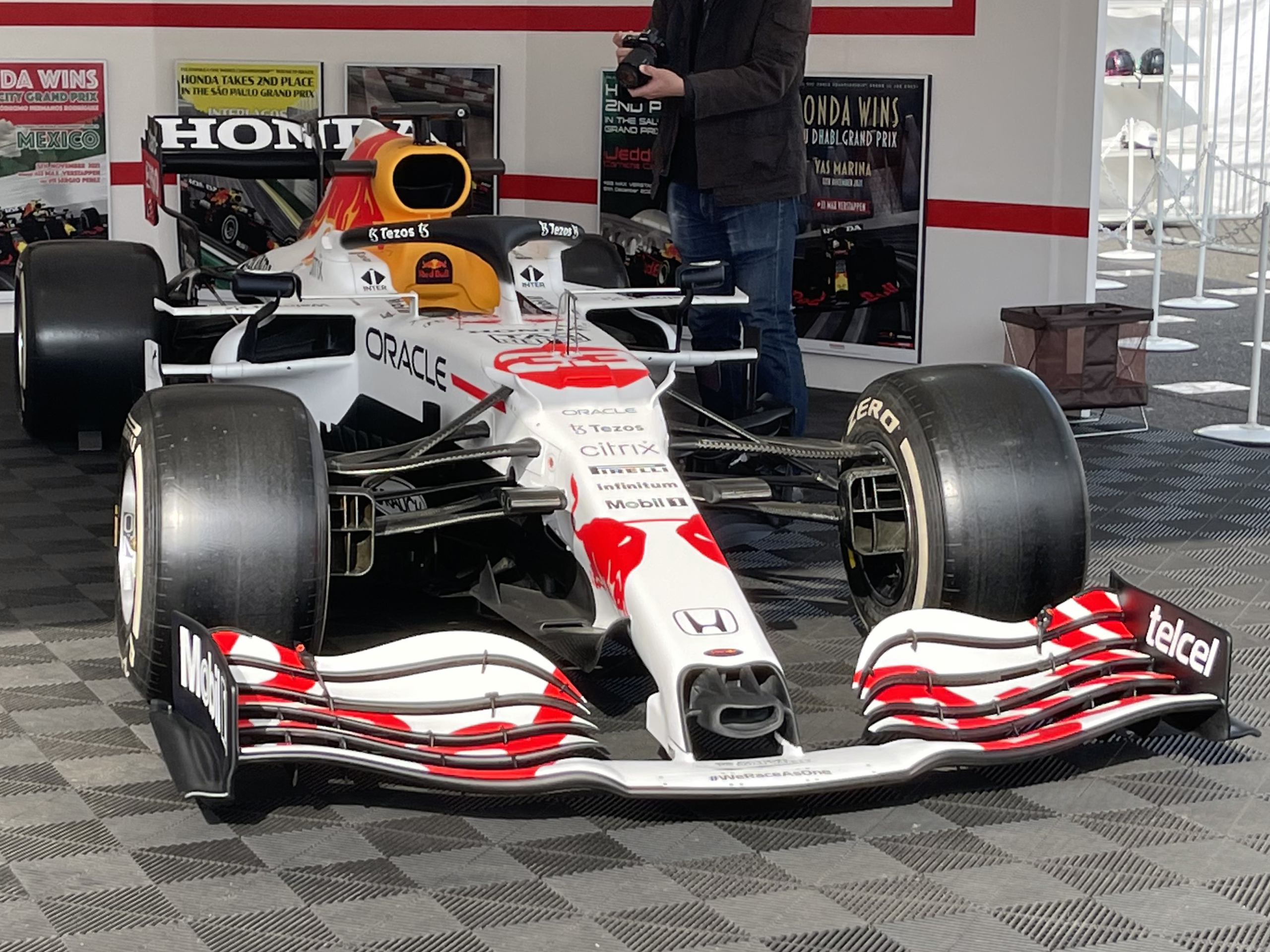
Both Verstappen and Pérez finished on the podium at the 2021 Turkish Grand Prix, where their cars featured a special Honda-themed livery.

Verstappen was involved in first-lap crashes at both the British and Hungarian Grands Prix, neither of which were deemed to be his fault by the stewards, and therefore he lost the championship lead to Hamilton. For the Belgian Grand Prix, Honda introduced a new energy store to further increase performance and reduce weight, having started the year with an old-spec unit. Verstappen subsequently regained the championship lead by winning the Belgian and Dutch Grands Prix, and slightly extended it after Italy, but briefly lost it again after finishing second in Russia. He retook the title lead by finishing second in Turkey as Hamilton suffered from an engine change penalty, while Pérez finished third to give Honda a double podium, with both Red Bulls running a special Honda-themed livery on the replacement for the cancelled Japanese Grand Prix. Verstappen won the following two races in the United States and Mexico, and after three second places in the next three races, he went into the season-ending Abu Dhabi Grand Prix tied on points for the lead with Hamilton. He took pole position for the race, but lost the lead to Hamilton at the start; however, a late restart following a safety car period enabled him to overtake Hamilton on the last lap for the race win and the World Championship. It was the first championship win for Honda in thirty years, with Verstappen becoming the first Honda-powered World Champion since Ayrton Senna in 1991. Meanwhile, AlphaTauri scored their biggest ever points haul, as Gasly took nine top-six finishes while rookie Honda junior Yuki Tsunoda finished seven times in the points with a best result of fourth, and the team finished sixth in the constructors' standings with Red Bull second. With Verstappen's title win, Honda became the first engine manufacturer to beat Mercedes to a World Championship in the turbo-hybrid era, and they also ended the season with the most wins.

== Interlude: Withdrawal and continued power unit supply to Red Bull (2022–2025) ==
Honda RBPT as a Formula One engine manufacturer
Formula One World Championship career
- First entry: 2023 Bahrain Grand Prix
- Last entry: 2025 Abu Dhabi Grand Prix
- Races entered: 70 (70 starts)
- Chassis: Red Bull Racing, AlphaTauri, Racing Bulls
- Constructors' Championships: 1 (2023)
- Drivers' Championships: 2 (2023, 2024)
- Race victories: 38
- Podiums: 62
- Points: 2063
- Pole positions: 30
- Fastest laps: 20

Following their decision to withdraw from Formula One at the end of 2021, Honda agreed to a deal with Red Bull to continue constructing, servicing, and supplying Red Bull Racing and Scuderia AlphaTauri with power units from its facility in Sakura. The deal was made possible by a power unit development freeze introduced for 2022, which allowed Honda to scale back its F1 operations and redirect its resources to other projects while still supporting Red Bull as Honda RBPT (Honda Red Bull Powertrains). Honda Racing Corporation (HRC) assumed responsibility for the programme, in a restructuring that also left it in control of Honda's other four-wheeled motorsports projects. The agreement initially only covered the 2022 season, after which the new Red Bull Powertrains company would assume responsibility for the manufacture and supply of the Honda-designed engines, but was later extended to the end of the 2025 season. Honda therefore retained all the rights to their power units, with Red Bull mostly just providing financial support for their operation.

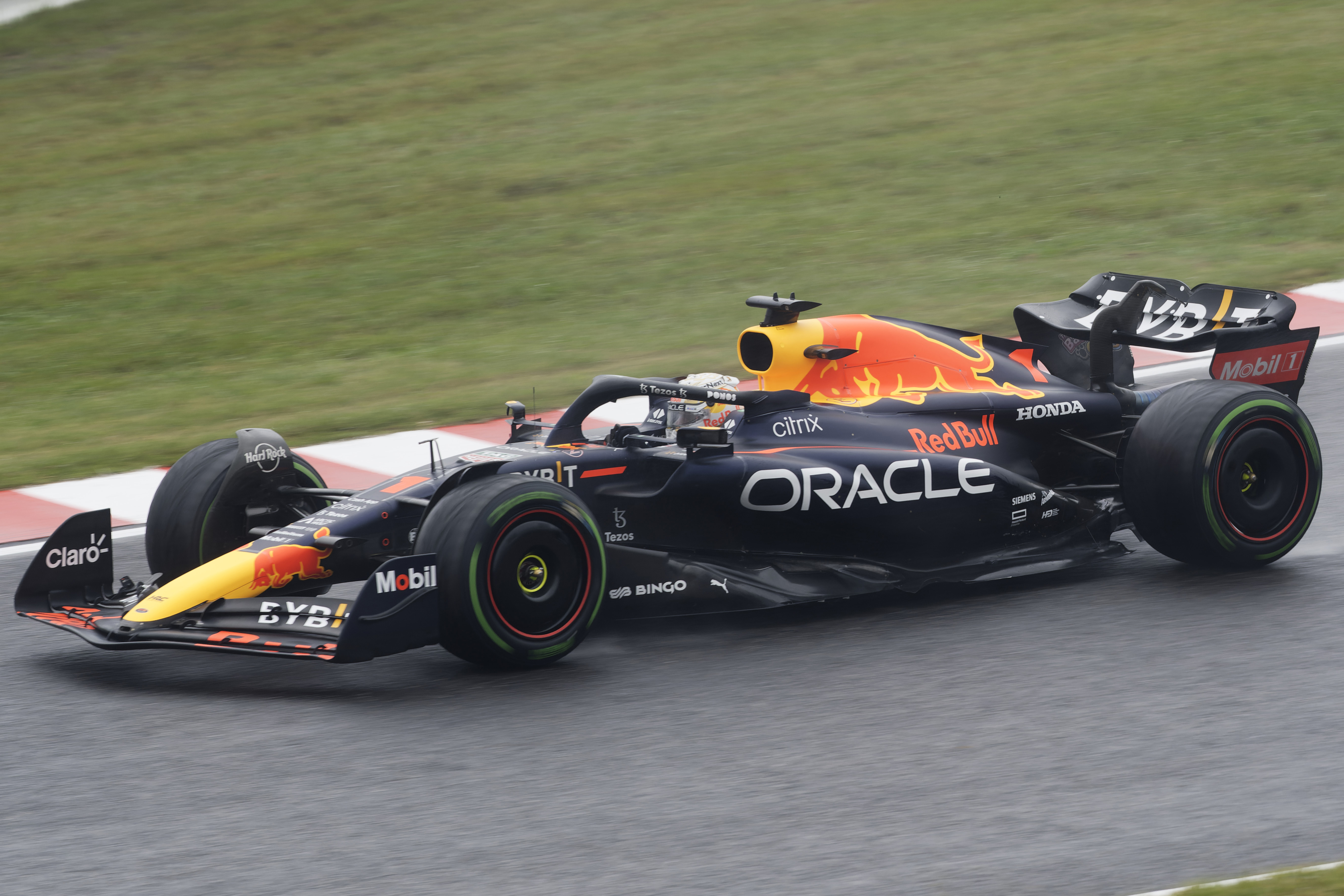
Verstappen secured the 2022 title with a win in Japan, where Honda branding returned to the cars using their power units.

During the 2022 season, the Honda-designed and built engines were badged as Red Bull Powertrains (RBPT) units, reflecting Honda's official withdrawal from Formula One. Honda's branding presence on the liveries and uniforms of the two teams was also reduced, and the Honda logos on the cars' liveries and drivers' suits were replaced by that of HRC. At the 2022 Japanese Grand Prix – a race for which Honda was the title sponsor – Honda and Red Bull announced a strengthening of their partnership, with Honda branding returning to both Red Bull Racing and AlphaTauri's liveries for the remainder of the season and beyond. Honda returned as a named power unit supplier for the 2023 season, supplying power units badged as Honda RBPT.

Honda's power unit design for the 2022–2025 period was strong in both performance and reliability. Multiple reports stated that it was, on average, around half a second faster per lap than the Renault power unit that Red Bull would otherwise have had to use. It contributed to Red Bull often having the best straight line performance in the field. In 2022, Verstappen scored a record 15 of Red Bull's 17 wins during the season and clinched his second consecutive title with a win in Honda's home race in Japan, while the team secured the constructors' title at the following United States Grand Prix. At the 2023 Hungarian Grand Prix, Red Bull won their 12th consecutive race to break McLaren's record set in the 1988 season. This meant that Honda broke its own record in the process as the 1988 McLaren MP4/4 was powered by Honda's RA168E.

Following a change in management since the decision was made to exit Formula One, Honda remained present in discussions regarding future Formula One regulations along with other manufacturers, and held discussions with various teams as to future possibilities for a partnership from the 2026 season onwards, when new power unit regulations would come into effect. The company did not renew its partnership with Red Bull, who had already committed to its own Red Bull Powertrains project, which would be backed by Ford from 2026. Honda subsequently announced it would make a full-scale return to F1 in 2026, partnering with Aston Martin.

== Fifth era (2026 onwards) ==
In December 2022, Honda, under its subsidiary Honda Racing Corporation (HRC), officially registered its interest with the FIA to be a power unit manufacturer when the new regulations will be introduced in 2026.

In May 2023, Honda confirmed its entry for 2026 and announced it would supply its hybrid power units to Aston Martin as a works team after eight years of partnership with Red Bull-owned teams. The increased role of the electric element of the power units, which will provide 50% of the total power output, and the introduction of 100% sustainable fuels played a key role in enticing the company to make a full-scale return for the new regulations. Honda previously collaborated with the Silverstone-based Formula One team in 2001 and 2002 when it was known as Jordan Grand Prix, and the team also ran Mugen-Honda engines between 1998 and 2000.

== Statistics ==
=== Formula One chassis results ===
- Winning percentage: 3.4%

(italics indicates non-works entries; bold indicates championships won)

Year	Name	Car	Engine	Tyres	No.	Drivers	Points	WCC
1964	(Japan) Honda R & D Company	RA271	RA271E 1.5 V12	**D**		(United States) Ronnie Bucknum	0	NC
1965	(Japan) Honda R & D Company	RA272	RA272E 1.5 V12	**G**		(United States) Ronnie Bucknum (United States) Richie Ginther	11	6th
1966	(Japan) Honda R & D Company	RA273	RA273E 3.0 V12	**G**		(United States) Ronnie Bucknum (United States) Richie Ginther	3	8th
1967	(Japan) Honda R & D Company	RA273; RA300	RA273E 3.0 V12	**F**		(United Kingdom) John Surtees	20	4th
1968	(Japan) Honda R & D Company	RA300; RA301; RA302	RA273E 3.0 V12; RA301E 3.0 V12; RA302E 3.0 V8	**F** **G**		(United Kingdom) David Hobbs (France) Jo Schlesser (United Kingdom) John Surtees	14	6th
1968	(Switzerland) Joakim Bonnier Racing Team	RA301	RA301E 3.0 V12	**G**		(Sweden) Joakim Bonnier	14	6th
1969 – 2005: Honda did not compete as a chassis constructor.
2006	(Japan) Lucky Strike Honda Racing F1 Team	RA106	RA806E 2.4 V8	**M**	11. 12.	(Brazil) Rubens Barrichello (United Kingdom) Jenson Button	86	4th
2007	(Japan) Honda Racing F1 Team	RA107	RA807E 2.4 V8	**B**	7. 8.	(United Kingdom) Jenson Button (Brazil) Rubens Barrichello	6	8th
2008	(Japan) Honda Racing F1 Team	RA108	RA808E 2.4 V8	**B**	16. 17.	(United Kingdom) Jenson Button (Brazil) Rubens Barrichello	14	9th

=== Formula One engine results ===
==== World Drivers' Championship wins ====
Driver	Season(s)	Total
(Brazil) Nelson Piquet	1987	1
(Brazil) Ayrton Senna	1988, 1990–1991	3
(France) Alain Prost	1989	1
(Netherlands) Max Verstappen	2021	1

Note: This table only includes engines/power units which were badged as "Honda":
* Max Verstappen won the 2022 Drivers' Championship with an RBPT-badged Honda power unit
* Max Verstappen won the 2023 and 2024 Drivers' Championship with a Honda RBPT power unit

==== World Constructors' Championship wins ====
Constructor	Season(s)	Total
(United Kingdom) Williams-Honda	1986–1987	2
(United Kingdom) McLaren-Honda	1988–1991	4

Note: This table only includes engines/power units which were badged as "Honda":
* Red Bull Racing-RBPT won the 2022 Constructors' Championship with a rebadged Honda power unit
* Red Bull Racing-Honda RBPT won the 2023 Constructors' Championship with a Honda RBPT power unit

==== Grand Prix results ====
Constructor	Season(s)	Total wins	First win	Last win	Pole positions	First pole	Last pole
(Japan) Honda	1964–1968, 2006–2008	3	1965 Mexican Grand Prix	2006 Hungarian Grand Prix	2	1968 Italian Grand Prix	2006 Australian Grand Prix
(United Kingdom) Spirit	1983	0	–	–	0	–	–
(United Kingdom) Williams	1983–1987	23	1984 Dallas Grand Prix	1987 Mexican Grand Prix	19	1985 French Grand Prix	1987 Mexican Grand Prix
(United Kingdom) Lotus	1987–1988	2	1987 Monaco Grand Prix	1987 Detroit Grand Prix	1	1987 San Marino Grand Prix	1987 San Marino Grand Prix
(United Kingdom) McLaren	1988–1992, 2015–2017	44	1988 Brazilian Grand Prix	1992 Australian Grand Prix	53	1988 Brazilian Grand Prix	1992 Canadian Grand Prix
(United Kingdom) Tyrrell	1991	0	–	–	0	–	–
(United Kingdom) BAR	2000–2005	0	–	–	2	2004 San Marino Grand Prix	2005 Canadian Grand Prix
(Republic of Ireland) Jordan	2001–2002	0	–	–	0	–	–
(Japan) Super Aguri	2006–2008	0	–	–	0	–	–
(Italy) Toro Rosso	2018–2019	0	–	–	0	–	–
(Austria) Red Bull	2019–2021	16	2019 Austrian Grand Prix	2021 Abu Dhabi Grand Prix	13	2019 Hungarian Grand Prix	2021 Abu Dhabi Grand Prix
(Italy) AlphaTauri	2020–2021	1	2020 Italian Grand Prix	2020 Italian Grand Prix	0	–	–
(United Kingdom) Aston Martin	2026–present	0	–	–	0	–	–
Total	1964–2026	89	1965 Mexican Grand Prix	2021 Abu Dhabi Grand Prix	90	1968 Italian Grand Prix	2021 Abu Dhabi Grand Prix

Note: This table only includes engines/power units which were badged as "Honda"; it does not include the 1992–2000 Mugen Honda engines, the 2022 RBPT power units (which were rebadged Hondas) or the 2023–2025 Honda RBPT power units.

== See also ==
- Honda in motorsport
- Mugen Motorsports
- Honda Grand Prix results

Achievements
Preceded by TAG	Formula One Constructors' Champion as an engine manufacturer 1986–1987–1988–1989–1990–1991	Succeeded by Renault
