= Honda RA301 =

Formula One racing automobile

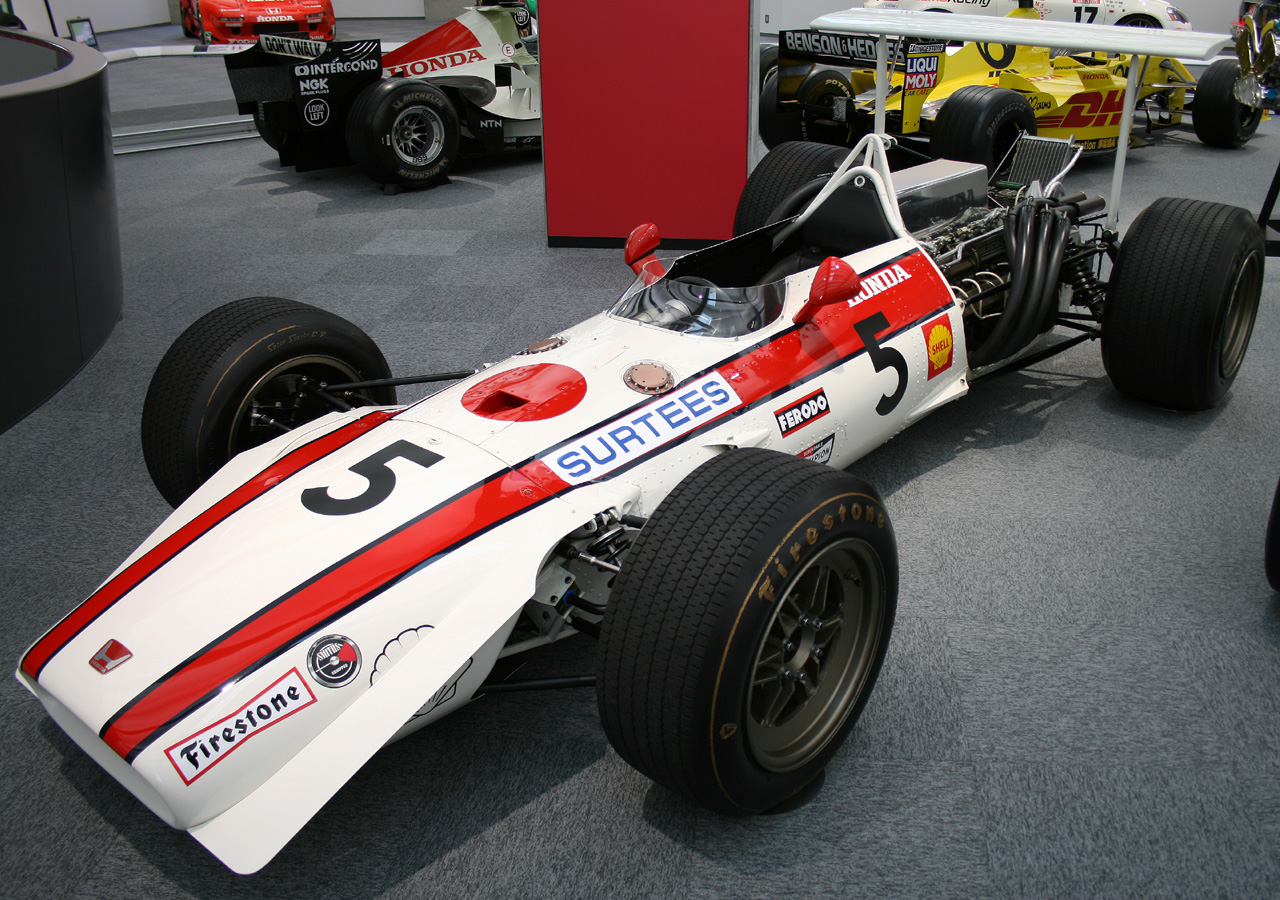
- John Surtees' 1968 Mexican Grand Prix-spec RA301 on display at the Honda Collection Hall in 2008
- Category: Formula One
- Constructor: Honda R&D
- Designers: Yoshio Nakamura (Honda), Shoichi Sano (Honda), Derrick White (Lola Cars)
- Predecessor: RA300
- Successor: RA302 - technical RA106 - chronological race order

Technical specifications
- Chassis: Aluminium monocoque
- Suspension (front): Double-wishbone
- Suspension (rear): Double-wishbone
- Axle track: Front: 56.7 in (144.0 cm); Rear: 55.1 in (140 cm)
- Wheelbase: 94.8 in (240.8 cm)
- Engine: Honda RA273E 2,991 cc (182.5 cu in) 90° V12 naturally aspirated mid-engined, longitudinally-mounted
- Transmission: Honda 5-speed manual
- Fuel: BP/Shell
- Tyres: Firestone

Competition history
- Notable entrants: Honda Racing
- Notable drivers: (United Kingdom) John Surtees
- Debut: 1968 Spanish Grand Prix
- Last event: 1968 Mexican Grand Prix
| Races | Wins | Podiums | Poles | F/Laps |
|---|---|---|---|---|
| 11 | 0 | 1 | 1 | 1 |
- Constructors' Championships: 0
- Drivers' Championships: 0
- Unless otherwise stated, all data refer to Formula One World Championship Grands Prix only.

The Honda RA301 was a Formula One racing car produced by Honda Racing for the 1968 Formula One season. It was introduced during the 1968 Spanish Grand Prix, the second round of the season. Like its predecessor (RA300), the car was co-developed by Lola Cars, and called "Lola T180" by Lola Cars.

== Overview ==
The car was an update of the previous season's RA300, using the same RA273E engine. As Honda was also focused on developing the air-cooled RA302, the RA301's development suffered and Surtees only managed a best of second place in the France. Poor reliability saw him managing to finish just two other races.

The car was planned to be replaced by the RA302 at the 1968 French Grand Prix, but Surtees refused to drive the new car because of safety concerns. After the death of Jo Schlesser at that race, Surtees again refused to drive the RA302 at the 1968 Italian Grand Prix, and the RA301 was used until the end of the season.

With Honda's withdrawal from Formula One at the end of the season, the RA301 was the last F1 car raced by Honda until the RA106 in 2006.

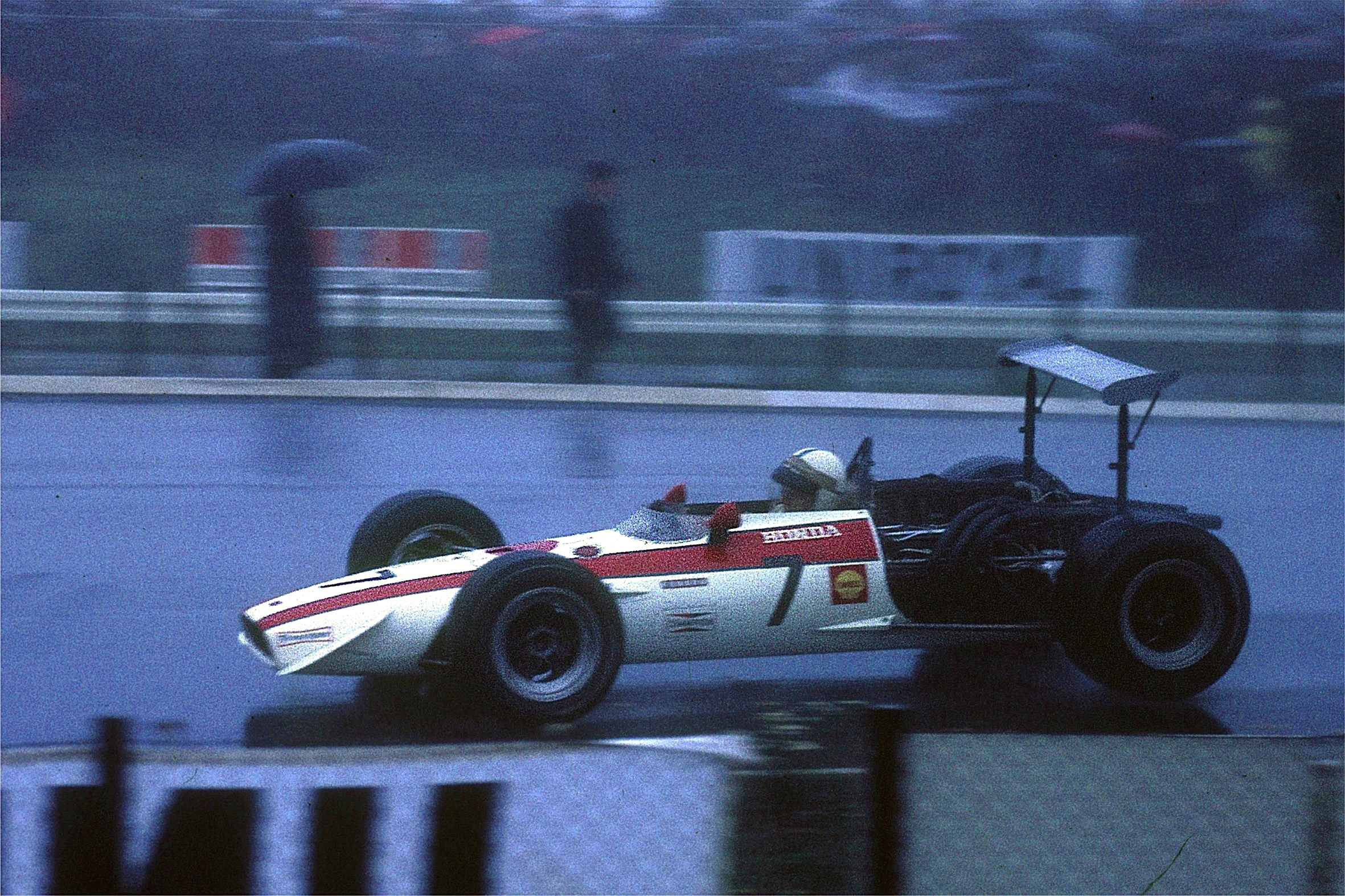
Surtees driving the RA301 at the 1968 German Grand Prix

== Complete Formula One World Championship results ==
(key) (results in bold indicate pole position; results in italics indicate fastest lap)

| Year | Entrant | Engine | Tyres | Drivers | 1 | 2 | 3 | 4 | 5 | 6 | 7 | 8 | 9 | 10 | 11 | 12 | Points | WCC |
|---|---|---|---|---|---|---|---|---|---|---|---|---|---|---|---|---|---|---|
| 1968 | Honda Racing | Honda 3.0 V12 | **F** | | RSA | ESP | MON | BEL | NED | FRA | GBR | GER | ITA | CAN | USA | MEX | **14** | **6th** |
| 1968 | Honda Racing | Honda 3.0 V12 | **F** | John Surtees | | Ret | Ret | Ret | Ret | 2 | 5 | Ret | **Ret** | Ret | 3 | Ret | **14** | **6th** |
| 1968 | Honda Racing | Honda 3.0 V12 | **F** | David Hobbs | | | | | | | | | Ret | | | | **14** | **6th** |
| 1968 | Joakim Bonnier Racing Team | Honda 3.0 V12 | **F** | Jo Bonnier | | | | | | | | | | | | 5 | **14** | **6th** |
