= 1968 Italian Grand Prix =

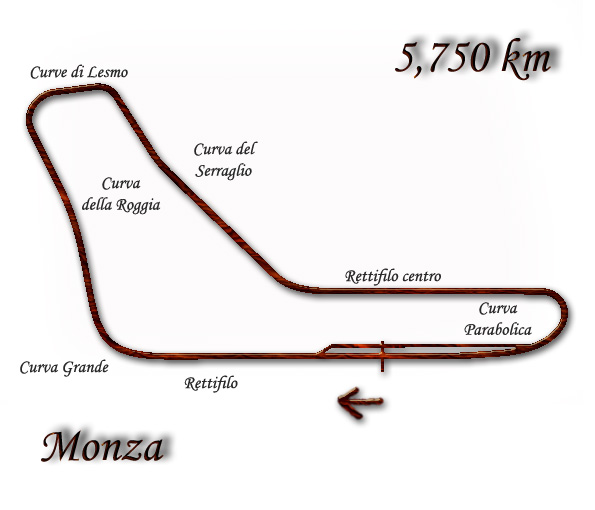

Race details
- Date: 8 September 1968
- Official name: XXXIX Gran Premio d'Italia
- Location: Autodromo Nazionale di Monza, Monza, Italy
- Course: Permanent racing facility
- Course length: 5.750 km (3.573 miles)
- Distance: 68 laps, 391.000 km (242.956 miles)
- Weather: Hot, Dry

Pole position
Driver	(United Kingdom) John Surtees	Honda
- Time: 1:26.07

Fastest lap
Driver	(United Kingdom) Jackie Oliver	Lotus-Ford
- Time: 1:26.5 on lap 7

Podium
First	(New Zealand) Denny Hulme	McLaren-Ford
Second	(France) Johnny Servoz-Gavin	Matra-Ford
Third	(Belgium) Jacky Ickx	Ferrari

The 1968 Italian Grand Prix was a Formula One motor race held at the Monza Autodrome on 8 September 1968. It was race 9 of 12 in both the 1968 World Championship of Drivers and the 1968 International Cup for Formula One Manufacturers. The 68-lap race was won by McLaren driver Denny Hulme after he started from seventh position. Johnny Servoz-Gavin finished second for the Matra team and Ferrari driver Jacky Ickx came in third.

There was a five-week break after the previous Grand Prix in Germany. During the break, the Oulton Park Gold Cup attracted some of the top names, with Jackie Stewart taking the victory, after his dominant victory at the Nürburgring.

== Report ==
=== Entry ===
24 F1 cars were entered for the event, the biggest field of the season. American Mario Andretti entered in a third Lotus, while his United States Auto Club (USAC) rival, Bobby Unser, replaced Richard Attwood at Owen Racing Organisation (BRM). Scuderia Ferrari ran a third car for rising English star, Derek Bell, while David Hobbs was fielded by Honda Racing.

=== Qualifying ===
The early qualifying session saw Andretti and Unser set the pace. Both drivers wanted to fly back to Indianapolis, Indiana for the Hoosier Hundred at the Indiana State Fairgrounds, a 100-lap race on the 1609 metre (one mile) dirt track for the USAC Championship the next day. They then intended to fly back to Milan and race in the Grand Prix. The event organisers announced that if the either driver returned to the US, they would be banned from competing in the Grand Prix, under an ACI ruling which forbade drivers to complete in another event within 24 hours of the start of the Grand Prix. Both drivers flew back to Indiana for the Hoosier Hundred and did return for the Italian Grand Prix, but were not allowed to take part in the race.

Qualifying resulted in John Surtees taking pole for the Honda Racing team, in their Honda RA301, at an average speed of 150.314 mph. He was joined on the front row by Bruce McLaren in his own McLaren M7A and Chris Amon in a Ferrari 312. The second row was occupied by the Ferrari of Jacky Ickx and the Lotus of Graham Hill. Jackie Stewart, Denny Hulme and Derek Bell shared the third row.

=== Race ===
The race was held over 68 laps of the Autodromo Nazionale di Monza, taking place in sunny conditions, with Surtees leading from the start. McLaren and Surtees fought for the lead, until the Ferrari of Chris Amon lost control on oil dropped by one of the Honda RA301s and his car flew over the barriers into the trees at one of the fast Lesmo corners. Surtees also hit the wall trying to avoid the Ferrari. This put Jo Siffert into second place, with Jackie Stewart third. The Scotsman moved into second and a slipstreaming battle developed for the lead between McLaren, Stewart, Siffert and Denny Hulme.

McLaren's M7A had to stop for more oil on lap 35 and retired. Stewart retired on lap 43 when his Cosworth engine failed. Hulme was by this stage already leading the race, and when Siffert went out with a rear suspension failure, nine laps from the end, Hulme was left to win. He won in a time of 1hr 40:14.8mins., averaging a speed of 146.284 mph. There had been a battle behind him, between Johnny Servoz-Gavin, Jacky Ickx and Jochen Rindt. The Ferrari of Ickx had emerged ahead, only to stop in the closing lap for more fuel. In the process, he dropped to third behind Servoz-Gavin, while Rindt had to retire with an engine failure. Piers Courage, Jean-Pierre Beltoise, and Jo Bonnier rounded out the top six, with no other finishers.

== Classification ==
=== Qualifying ===
Pos	No	Driver	Constructor	Time	Gap	Grid
1	14	(United Kingdom) John Surtees	Honda	1:26.07	—	1
2	2	(New Zealand) Bruce McLaren	McLaren-Ford	1:26.11	+0.04	2
3	9	(New Zealand) Chris Amon	Ferrari	1:26.21	+0.14	3
4	8	(Belgium) Jacky Ickx	Ferrari	1:26.41	+0.34	4
5	16	(United Kingdom) Graham Hill	Lotus-Ford	1:26.57	+0.50	5
6	4	(United Kingdom) Jackie Stewart	Matra-Ford	1:26.60	+0.53	6
7	1	(New Zealand) Denny Hulme	McLaren-Ford	1:26.61	+0.54	7
8	7	(United Kingdom) Derek Bell	Ferrari	1:26.90	+0.83	8
9	20	(Switzerland) Jo Siffert	Lotus-Ford	1:26.96	+0.89	9
10	18	(United States) Mario Andretti	Lotus-Ford	1:27.20	+1.13	DNS
11	11	(Austria) Jochen Rindt	Brabham-Repco	1:27.30	+1.23	10
12	19	(United Kingdom) Jackie Oliver	Lotus-Ford	1:27.40	+1.33	11
13	21	(United States) Dan Gurney	Eagle-Weslake	1:27.61	+1.54	12
14	5	(France) Johnny Servoz-Gavin	Matra-Ford	1:27.63	+1.56	13
15	15	(United Kingdom) David Hobbs	Honda	1:27.70	+1.63	14
16	26	(Mexico) Pedro Rodríguez	BRM	1:28.20	+2.13	15
17	10	(Australia) Jack Brabham	Brabham-Repco	1:28.80	+2.73	16
18	27	(United Kingdom) Piers Courage	BRM	1:29.10	+3.03	17
19	6	(France) Jean-Pierre Beltoise	Matra	1:29.30	+3.23	18
20	3	(Sweden) Jo Bonnier	McLaren-BRM	1:30.55	+4.48	19
21	25	(United States) Bobby Unser	BRM	1:30.56	+4.49	DNS
22	23	(United Kingdom) Vic Elford	Cooper-BRM	1:31.30	+5.23	20
DNQ	28	(Australia) Frank Gardner	BRM	1:31.40	+5.33	—
DNQ	12	(Switzerland) Silvio Moser	Brabham-Repco	1:33.70	+7.63	—

=== Race ===
Pos	No	Driver	Constructor	Laps	Time/Retired	Grid	Points
1	1	(New Zealand) Denny Hulme	McLaren-Ford	68	1:40:14.8	7	9
2	5	(France) Johnny Servoz-Gavin	Matra-Ford	68	+ 1:28.4	13	6
3	8	(Belgium) Jacky Ickx	Ferrari	68	+ 1:28.6	4	4
4	27	(United Kingdom) Piers Courage	BRM	67	+ 1 Lap	17	3
5	6	(France) Jean-Pierre Beltoise	Matra	66	+ 2 Laps	18	2
6	3	(Sweden) Jo Bonnier	McLaren-BRM	64	+ 4 Laps	19	1
Ret	20	(Switzerland) Jo Siffert	Lotus-Ford	58	Suspension	9	
Ret	10	(Australia) Jack Brabham	Brabham-Repco	56	Oil Pressure	16	
Ret	4	(United Kingdom) Jackie Stewart	Matra-Ford	42	Engine	6	
Ret	15	(United Kingdom) David Hobbs	Honda	42	Engine	14	
Ret	19	(United Kingdom) Jackie Oliver	Lotus-Ford	38	Transmission	11	
Ret	2	(New Zealand) Bruce McLaren	McLaren-Ford	34	Oil Leak	2	
Ret	11	(Austria) Jochen Rindt	Brabham-Repco	33	Engine	10	
Ret	26	(Mexico) Pedro Rodríguez	BRM	22	Engine	15	
Ret	21	(United States) Dan Gurney	Eagle-Weslake	19	Overheating	12	
Ret	16	(United Kingdom) Graham Hill	Lotus-Ford	10	Wheel	5	
Ret	14	(United Kingdom) John Surtees	Honda	8	Accident	1	
Ret	9	(New Zealand) Chris Amon	Ferrari	8	Accident	3	
Ret	7	(United Kingdom) Derek Bell	Ferrari	4	Fuel System	8	
Ret	23	(United Kingdom) Vic Elford	Cooper-BRM	2	Accident	20	
DNQ	28	(Australia) Frank Gardner	BRM				
DNQ	12	(Switzerland) Silvio Moser	Brabham-Repco				
DNS	18	(United States) Mario Andretti	Lotus-Ford		ACI 24 hour rule		
DNS	25	(United States) Bobby Unser	BRM		ACI 24 hour rule		
WD	22	(United Kingdom) Robin Widdows	Cooper-BRM				
WD	24	(Belgium) Lucien Bianchi	Cooper-Alfa Romeo				

== Notes ==
- This was the Formula One World Championship debut for British driver and future Le Mans winner Derek Bell.
- This was the first pole position for Honda and for a Japanese/Asian constructor and for a Honda-powered car and for a Japanese/Asian engine supplier.

== Championship standings after the race ==
Drivers' Championship standings

	Pos	Driver	Points
	1	(United Kingdom) Graham Hill	30
1	2	(Belgium) Jacky Ickx	27
1	3	(United Kingdom) Jackie Stewart	26
	4	(New Zealand) Denny Hulme	24
	5	(Mexico) Pedro Rodríguez	11

Constructors' Championship standings

Pos	Constructor	Points
1	(United Kingdom) Lotus-Ford	44
2	(France) Matra-Ford	35
3	(Italy) Ferrari	32
4	(United Kingdom) McLaren-Ford	31
5	(United Kingdom) BRM	21

- Note: Only the top five positions are included for both sets of standings.

Previous race: 1968 German Grand Prix	FIA Formula One World Championship; 1968 season	Next race: 1968 Canadian Grand Prix
Previous race: 1967 Italian Grand Prix	Italian Grand Prix	Next race: 1969 Italian Grand Prix
