= BRM P115 =

- Category: Formula One
- Constructor: British Racing Motors
- Designer: Tony Rudd
- Predecessor: BRM P83
- Successor: BRM P126

Technical specifications
- Chassis: Magnesium alloy monocoque
- Suspension (front): Double wishbone, with inboard spring/damper units
- Suspension (rear): Double wishbone, with outboard coilover spring/damper units
- Axle track: F: 59 in (1,499 mm) (adj.); R: 60 in (1,524 mm) (adj.)
- Wheelbase: 96 in (2,438 mm) (adjustable)
- Engine: BRM P75 2,996 cc (182.8 cu in) H16 naturally aspirated, mid-mounted
- Transmission: 6-speed manual
- Weight: 1,380 lb (626.0 kg)
- Fuel: Shell
- Tyres: Goodyear

Competition history
- Notable entrants: Owen Racing Organisation
- Notable drivers: (United Kingdom) Jackie Stewart (United Kingdom) Mike Spence
- Debut: 1967 German Grand Prix
Races	Wins	Poles	F/Laps
6	0	0	0
- Constructors' Championships: 0
- Drivers' Championships: 0
- Unless otherwise stated, all data refer to Formula One World Championship Grands Prix only.

The BRM P115 was a Formula 1 racing car built by British Racing Motors in 1967.

The car was designed by Technical Director Tony Rudd around BRM's complicated 3 litre H-16 engine, known as the P75, which had first raced in France in 1966 in a Lotus 43.

== Design ==
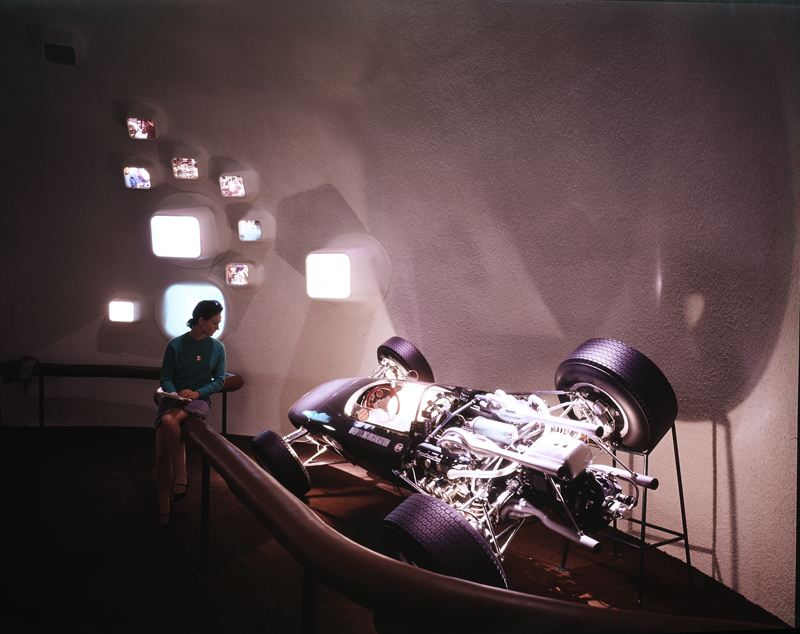
A BRM P109 similar to the P115 on display at Expo 67

The P115 was a significant refinement of the P83 it replaced, with the most obvious differences being a squarer appearance and the external cooling pipes seen on the P83 being moved within the chassis for better aerodynamics. Magnesium alloy was used to reduce weight over the Duralumin P83, but the car and engine combination was still horrendously overweight compared to its F1 contemporaries, weighing over 620 kg compared to cars like the Lotus 49 and Brabham BT24 which weighed not much more than 500 kg. Added to this the weight distribution was not only significantly rearward but also quite high up due to the higher of the engine's two crankshafts being so high up in the car, as well as the need to raise the engine slightly to accommodate the exhausts from the lower set of cylinders. All this led to less than ideal handling characteristics for the car.

Only one example was built and it was entered in the last 5 Grands Prix of 1967 in the hands of Jackie Stewart, with Mike Spence driving the car in the first race of 1968. The car failed to finish any of these races due to various engine and transmission failures.

== 1967 season ==
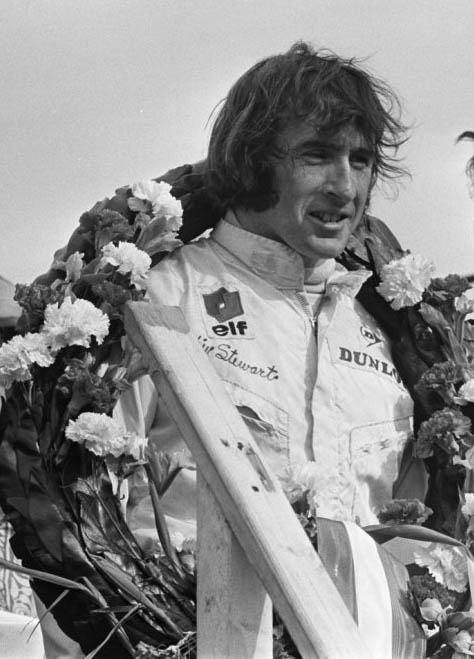
Jackie Stewart (shown in 1969) drove the P115 in 1967

The P115 first appeared at the Dutch Grand Prix (along with the new Brabham BT24 and Lotus 49) but was not raced until the German Grand Prix at the Nürburgring. Stewart tended to go well at the Nürburgring and managed to qualify the car on the front row with the third fastest time of 8:15.2. Having dropped to seventh after the start Stewart managed to work his way back to third by lap 5 when his race was terminated by the same differential failure that had affected Spence's P83 earlier in the race.

At the next race at Mosport Park Stewart qualified in 9th, and made a good start in wet conditions getting past Bruce McLaren and Jack Brabham who were immediately in front of him on the grid. Stewart performed exceptionally as the rain came down but slid off while battling for second place and while the car was undamaged, dirt had penetrated the throttle causing it to stick and forcing him to retire after 65 laps.

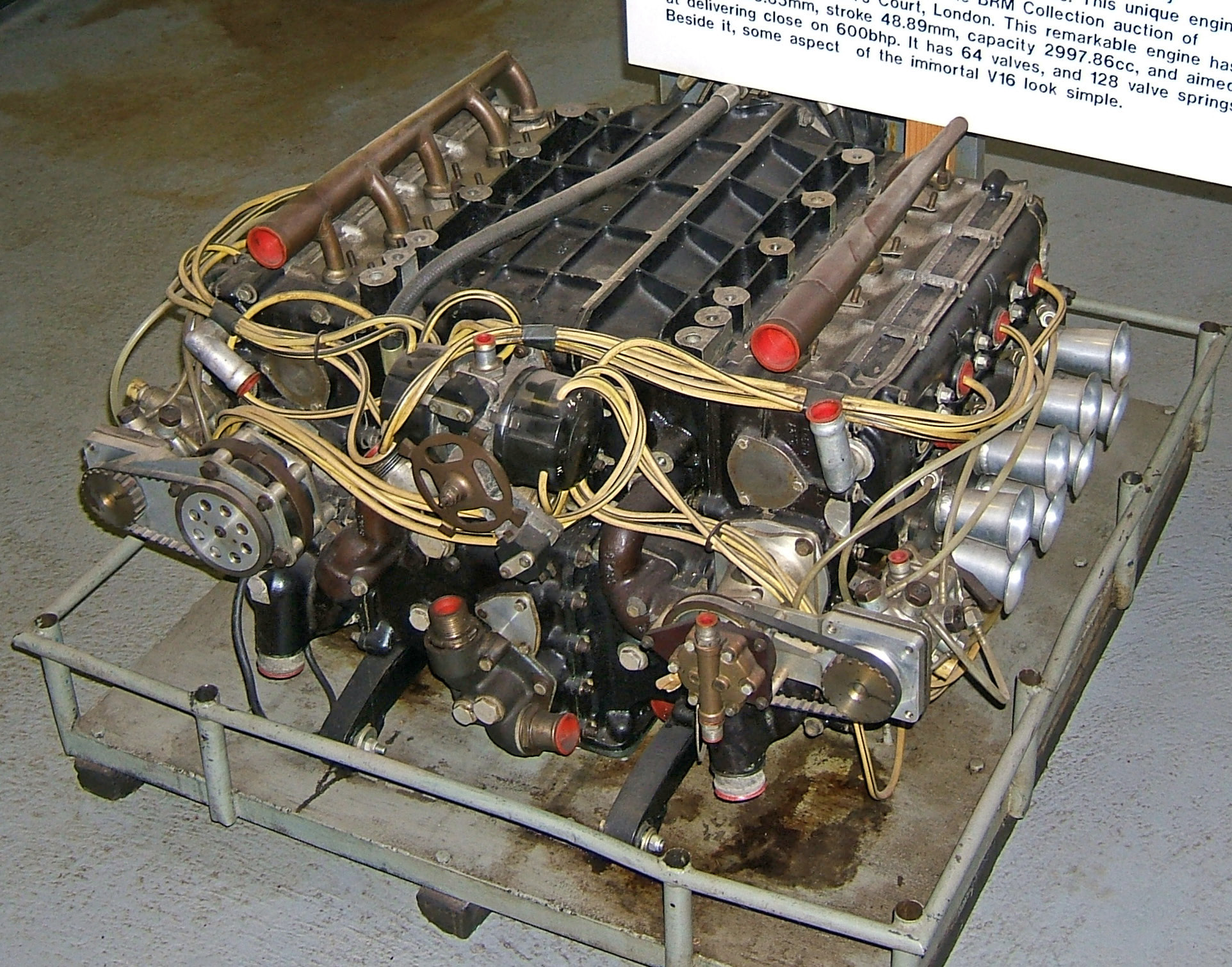
the BRM Type 75 H16 engine fitted in the P115

At Monza Stewart qualified on the third row just over a second behind pole-sitter Clark, but hit a guard rail on lap 7 while running fifth, resuming flat last after a pit stop to inspect the damage and circulating until an engine failure put him out after 45 laps.

For the United States Grand Prix at Watkins Glen Stewart managed tenth on the grid, alongside McLaren who was using his M5A with the BRM V12 engine that would replace the H16 for 1968. Stewart suffered from brake problems for most of the race before a belt driving his fuel injection broke on lap 72.

The Mexican Grand Prix would be Stewart's last for BRM, as after two years battling with the H16's many problems he decided to join Ken Tyrrell's new team for 1968. Stewart could only manage 12th on the grid, equalling his worst of the year, and made little progress before his engine failed on lap 24.

== 1968 season ==
For 1968 BRM decided to cut their losses with the H16 and built the BRM P126 around the 3 litre V12 that had originally been intended as a customer engine. For the first race of the year two P126s and the P115 were taken to Kyalami. Spence was entered in both types and went with the P115 after setting a faster time with it in practice than with the new car. Starting 13th Spence managed 8 laps before a problem in the fuel system put him out. The P115 was not entered in a Formula One race again, and it was also the last championship Grand Prix for Spence who was killed practising a Lotus 56 at the Indianapolis 500.

== Formula One World Championship results ==
Year	Entrant	Engine	Tyres	Drivers	1	2	3	4	5	6	7	8	9	10	11	12	Points	WCC
1967	Owen Racing Organisation	BRM 3.0 H16	G		RSA	MON	NED	BEL	FRA	GBR	GER	CAN	ITA	USA	MEX		17^{1}	6th^{1}
1967	Owen Racing Organisation	BRM 3.0 H16	G	Jackie Stewart							Ret	Ret	Ret	Ret	Ret		17^{1}	6th^{1}
1968	Owen Racing Organisation	BRM 3.0 H16	G		RSA	ESP	MON	BEL	NED	FRA	GBR	GER	ITA	CAN	USA	MEX	28^{2}	5th^{2}
1968	Owen Racing Organisation	BRM 3.0 H16	G	Mike Spence	Ret												28^{2}	5th^{2}

^1 All points scored by BRM P83 and BRM P261 cars
^2 All points scored by BRM P126 and BRM P133 cars

== Computer simulation ==
A driveable, detailed virtual recreation of the P115 was one of the original cars simulated in the PC-based F1-simulation Grand Prix Legends, and the only one with a 6-speed gearbox, and left hand gear change.
