= BRM P83 =

Formula One Car

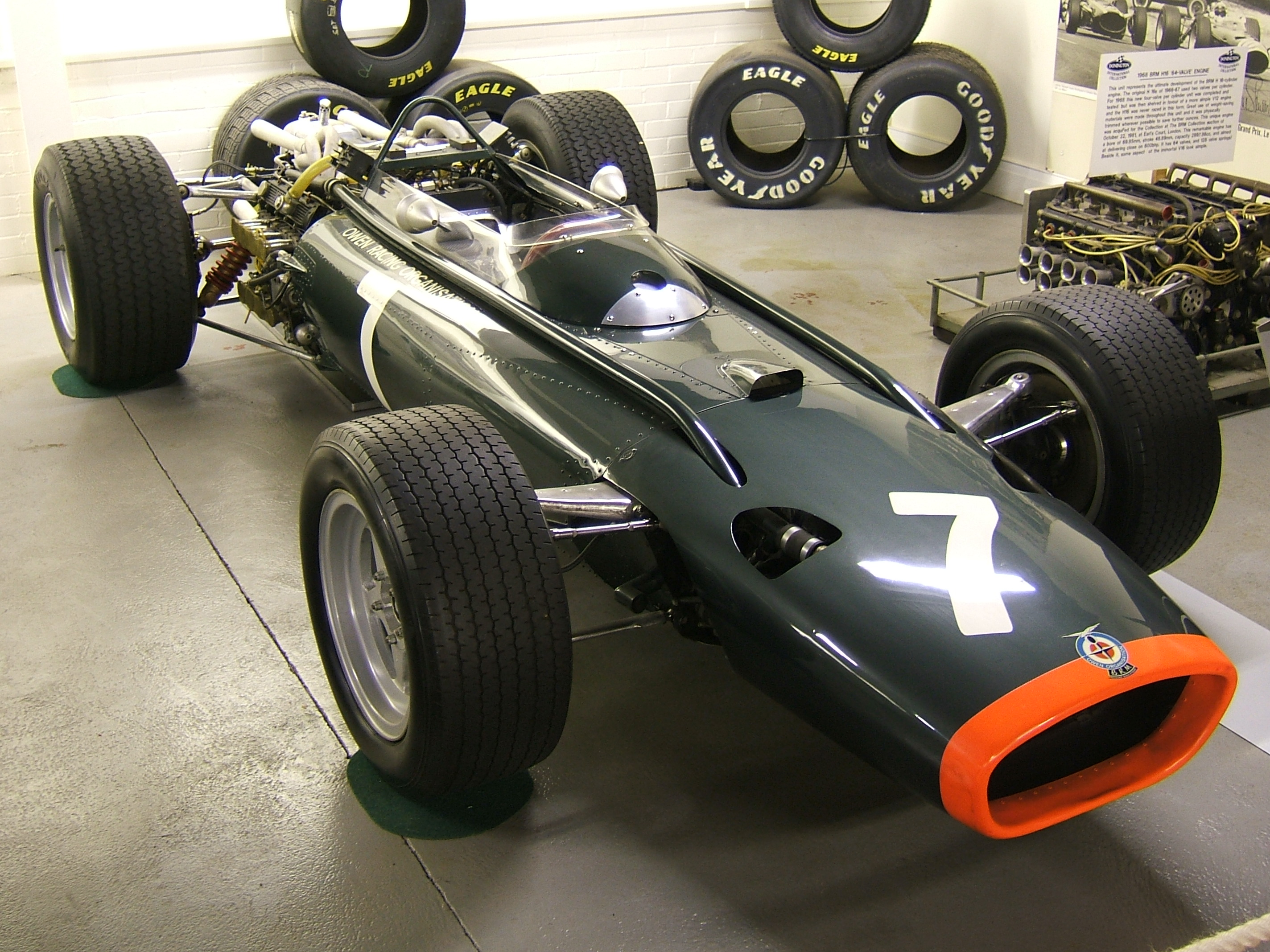
- BRM P83 on display at the Donington Grand Prix Collection
- Category: Formula One
- Constructor: British Racing Motors
- Designers: Tony Rudd; John Crosthwaite
- Predecessor: BRM P261 / BRM P67
- Successor: BRM P115

Technical specifications
- Chassis: Duralumin monocoque
- Suspension (front): Double wishbone, with inboard spring/damper units
- Suspension (rear): Double wishbone, with outboard coilover spring/damper units
- Axle track: F: 59 in (1,499 mm) (adj.); R: 60 in (1,524 mm) (adj.)
- Wheelbase: 96 in (2,438 mm) (adjustable)
- Engine: BRM P75 2,999 cc (183.0 cu in) H16 naturally aspirated, mid-mounted
- Transmission: 6-speed manual
- Weight: 1,480 lb (671 kg)
- Fuel: Shell
- Tyres: Dunlop, Goodyear

Competition history
- Notable entrants: Owen Racing Organisation; Reg Parnell Racing
- Notable drivers: (United Kingdom) Jackie Stewart (United Kingdom) Graham Hill (United Kingdom) Mike Spence (United Kingdom) Chris Irwin
- Debut: 1966 Italian Grand Prix
- Last event: 1967 Mexican Grand Prix
Races	Wins	Poles	F/Laps
14	0	0	0
- Constructors' Championships: 0
- Drivers' Championships: 0
- Unless otherwise stated, all data refer to Formula One World Championship Grands Prix only.

The BRM P83 was a Formula One racing car designed by Tony Rudd and Geoff Johnson and built by British Racing Motors for the new engine regulations of 1966. It used a highly unorthodox H16 engine which caused problems throughout the car's racing life, and despite the best efforts of Graham Hill and Jackie Stewart took BRM from championship contenders to also-rans, leading it to be regarded alongside the BRM Type 15 as another embarrassing failure for the British marque caused by overcomplicated engineering.

== Introduction ==
After winning the 1962 Drivers' and Constructors' championships BRM had finished second each year, coming close to the championship in 1964 and having a promising 1965 season with the excellent P261. In 1966 the Formula One regulations with regards to engines were changed from a maximum 1.5 litres normally aspirated to either 3 litres normally aspirated or 1.5 litres supercharged following complaints that the smaller engines used from 1961 to 1965 weren't powerful enough for the premier category of motorsport. As a result, many teams were left looking for a new engine supply while BRM, who built their own very successful V8 engines, had to decide on what manner of new engine to develop to meet the new formula.

== P75 H16 engine ==
BRM decided to hedge their bets by developing their existing 16 valve 1.5 litre V8 into a 32 valve 3 litre H16 (effectively two flat 8s one on top of the other and geared together) while also developing a new 48 valve 3 litre V12 in partnership with Harry Weslake and opt for whichever turned out to be the better powerplant. After much debate Sir Alfred Owen decided BRM would go with the H16 and Weslake bought out BRM's involvement in the V12 and produced the engine that went on to power the Eagle T1G. The H16's development was complicated by BRM's involvement in two further V12 designs and a 4.2 litre version of the H16 for Lotus to use at Indianapolis.

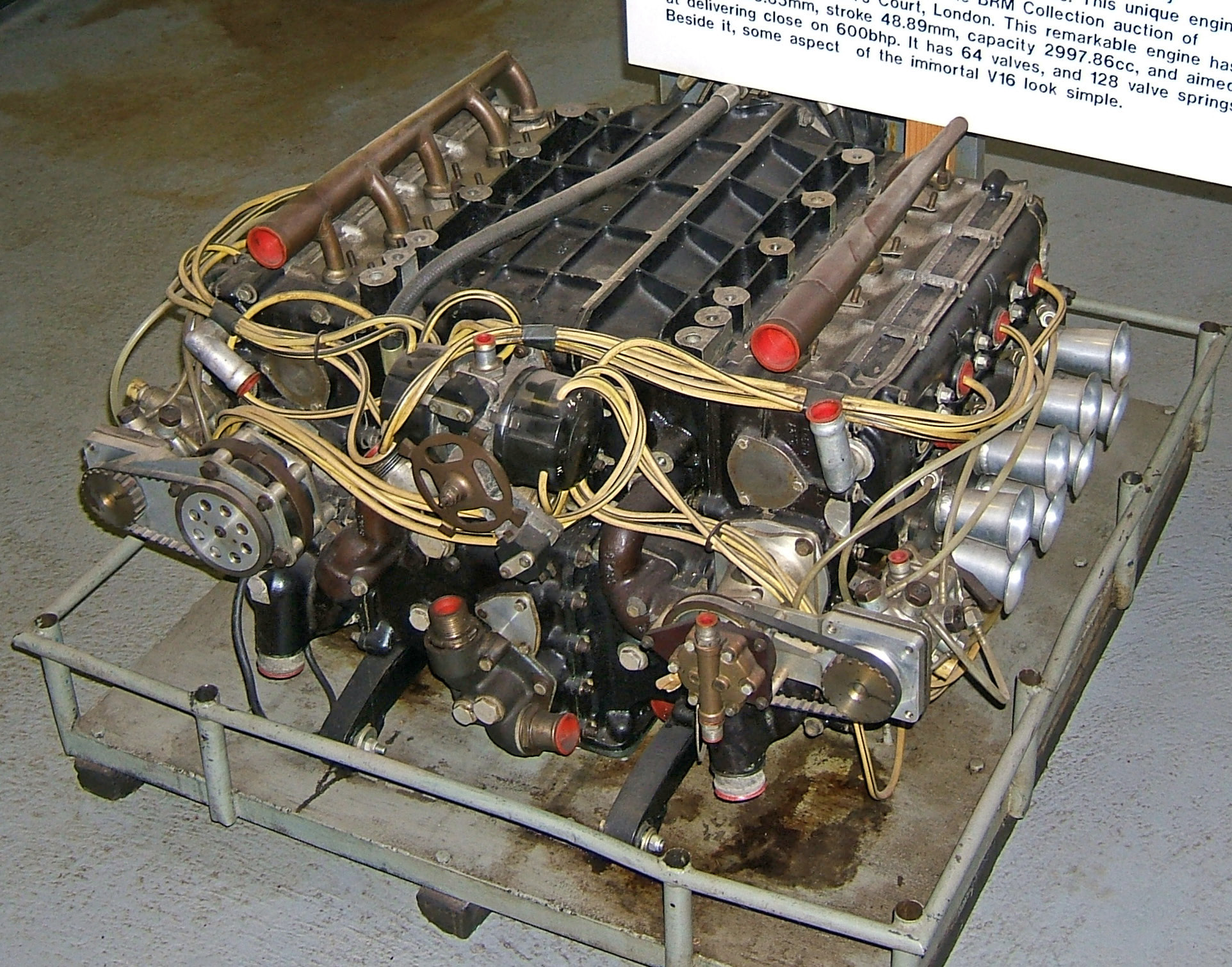
the BRM Type 75 H16 engine

Various crankshaft vibration problems dogged the engine from the start, and to compound matters quick-fix balancing weights attached to the crankshafts developed the unfortunate habit of detaching themselves and flying off within the engines causing several catastrophic engine failures. Each side of the engine had to have its own water radiator, fuel metering unit, distributor and water pump, with a common oil radiator. The sheer complexity of the engine led to a truly terrible record of unreliability; engine, transmission and related problems caused 27 of the powerplant's 30 retirements from 40 entries. Jackie Stewart said of the engine "it was unnecessarily large, used more fuel, carried more oil and needed more water - all of which added weight and diminished the vehicle's agility" The initial 32 valve engine produced 395 horsepower at 10,250 RPM, with a later 64 valve variant raising this to 420 hp at 10,500 RPM. While these constituted reasonable figures compared to the Ferrari, Honda and Weslake V12s and the Cosworth V8 of 1967, the H16 had an extremely narrow power band and was by some distance the heaviest engine on the grid, starting out weighing 555 lb when introduced in 1966 with the final lightweight version lowering this to 398 lb.

The engine was also used by Team Lotus in the Lotus 43 as a stopgap while the Cosworth DFV was developed.

== P83 chassis ==
Like contemporary designs such as the Lotus 33 and Cooper T81, the P83 chassis was a riveted monocoque made of Duralumin with integral fuel tanks running down the chassis on either side of the driver. Unlike these cars though, the engine was designed to be a stressed member of the chassis in the same configuration that the much more successful Cosworth DFV would later establish as the norm, and was mated to a 6-speed gearbox, with the gear lever unusually situated to the left of the driver. The front suspension was conventionally arranged, with unequal length double wishbones and inboard coil springs and dampers. The rear suspension consisted of twin radius arms, reversed lower wishbones, single top links and outboard springs and dampers, attached to the gearbox and engine. The size of the engine gave the car a centre of gravity that was not just rearward but higher than other cars, due to the height of the upper crankshaft above the ground and the need to have the entire engine raised slightly to make room for the lower set of exhausts which left the engine from underneath the car.

== 1966 championship season ==
The first outing for the P83 came at the first race of 1966 in Monaco, Stewart trying out the car in practise before driving a P261 to victory in the race. In Belgium both Hill and Stewart practised with the P83, both opting to use the P261 in the race, Stewart having his infamous crash at Masta which put him out of the next race in France. Two P83s were now available and around the fast Reims circuit Hill set a time which would have been good enough for fourth on the grid, but started eighth in the P261 instead after having gearbox problems.

The P83 was left behind for the next three races while work was done to try to cure the H16's various issues, but for the last three races both cars finally reached the start line, with a third P83 and a P261 taken as spares. At Monza the team had problems all weekend, with even the P261's engine failing at one stage, and in the race Hill's H16 blew on lap one while Stewart had to retire when a leaking fuel tank left him soaked in petrol.

Two cars were entered for the 1966 International Gold Cup at Oulton Park where Stewart qualified third with Hill fourth, but after a promising display with first Stewart and then Hill each leading the race ahead of eventual winner Brabham both cars retired with engine problems. The 1966 United States Grand Prix offered the largest prize of the year, and Hill and Stewart lined up fifth and sixth on the grid. Hill suffered gearbox problems early on in the race but managed to carry on, while with other cars retiring Stewart found himself in third place by lap 35, a fair way behind Clark's Lotus 43 with BRM H16 in second. Hill finally retired with a broken differential on lap 53, and a lap later Stewart also had to retire when a cylinder liner broke. On the following lap the leader Brabham broke a camshaft, allowing Clark to nurse his car home for an incredible first (and it turned out, only) F1 win for the BRM H16 engine.

Hill and Stewart lined up seventh and tenth for the final race of the year in Mexico, both cars leaking oil in practise caused by a leaking oil pressure relief valve that was easily fixed. In the race Hill's engine was misfiring from the start and lasted 18 laps, while Stewart moved up to third trailing smoke as another leak slowly drained all the oil from the engine, retiring after 26 laps. After being second and fifth in the Championship after six rounds in the P261, Hill and Stewart ended the season without adding to their points in fifth and seventh place.

== 1967 season ==
Graham Hill left BRM at the end of 1966 and was replaced by Mike Spence. For the first race in South Africa Stewart qualified ninth with Spence 13th, and the team started 1967 as 1966 had finished, Stewart's engine blowing after two laps and Spence retiring with an oil leak before half distance. Between South Africa and Monaco, BRM and most of the other leading teams took part in three non-championship races in Britain. Spence was BRM's only entry at Brands Hatch for the 1967 Race of Champions where he qualifying in eighth, finished 5th in Heat 1, 7th in Heat 2 and 7th again in the final race. Stewart was back with Spence for the Oulton Park Spring Cup with Stewart qualifying in pole position a full second ahead of Denny Hulme's Brabham, with Spence fifth. In the first heat Stewart encountered problems and finished six laps down in last place, but Spence managed his best result in the car in third place. In the second heat both cars finished with Stewart fourth and Spence sixth, with Spence sixth again in the final and Stewart crashing out. The last non-championship race for the car was the International Trophy at Silverstone, Stewart driving the P83 while Spence was in a P261. Stewart again qualified on pole position setting the same time as Mike Parkes's Ferrari, but retired with gearbox problems after 17 laps.

For Monaco. Stewart went back to the P261 while Spence persisted with the P83. He qualified twelfth on the sixteen-car grid and scored the P83's first points with sixth place in the race, although he was the last car to finish and fully 4 laps behind Denny Hulme's Brabham. At Zandvoort. Stewart and Spence lined up on the fifth row in eleventh and twelfth, more than 2.5 seconds behind the new Lotus Ford of Hill who took pole. Stewart ran as high as fifth before retiring with brake problems, while Spence drove steadily and finished three laps down in eighth place. For the Belgian Grand Prix the fast layout of Spa suited the H16 a little better and Stewart qualified in sixth with Spence eleventh. In the race oil spilled by Stewart's car led to Mike Parkes's career-ending accident at Blanchimont on lap one, but Stewart was running well and inherited the lead when Clark's leading Lotus suffered problems. Stewart himself was then overtaken by winner Dan Gurney after his car developed a gearbox problem, having to be driven single-handed while the other hand held the gear lever in place. Nevertheless, Stewart brought the car home in second more than half a minute ahead of Chris Amon, while Spence scored points again finishing a lap down in fifth place.

The French Grand Prix took place on the tight and twisty Le Mans Bugatti circuit, and Stewart again opted for the more nimble P261 while Spence took Stewart's 8303 chassis and Spence's 8302 chassis was entered by Reg Parnell Racing with Chris Irwin driving. Irwin out-qualified Stewart taking 9th place on the grid, while Spence was a second slower in twelfth. In the race Spence completed nine laps before a halfshaft broke, while Irwin was running fourth when an engine problem put him out, although he was still classified in fifth place. At Silverstone both of the works P83s suffered suspension failures in practice, and as a result Stewart took over the Reg Parnell P83 of Irwin, who in turn was given the P261 of Piers Courage, who had to sit out the race. For once Spence out-qualified Stewart with the two cars in 11th and 12th place but at the end of the second lap Spence's electrics caught fire and he lost ten minutes while the car was repaired. Stewart broke down after 20 laps with transmission problems and after 44 laps Spence retired from 13th with further electrical problems.

BRM built a new lightweight P115 chassis which arrived for the German Grand Prix, and Stewart would use this car for the rest of the season leaving Spence and Irwin in the heavier P83s. While Stewart put the new car on the front row Spence and Irwin were well back in eleventh and fifteenth out of the seventeen F1 runners, Spence becoming the first retirement after three out of fifteen laps with the same differential problems that would claim Stewart later in the race. Meanwhile, Irwin took advantage of the many retirements and finished the race two laps down in seventh place.

The three H16 BRMs of Stewart, Spence and Irwin were together on the grid in ninth, tenth and eleventh place for the Canadian Grand Prix, and at the start all three cars gained places, the weight of the engine perhaps providing added traction in the wet conditions. Irwin climbed as high as seventh before falling back and ultimately spinning off after 18 laps. Spence again got the car to the finish and after running in eighth for much of the race a spate of late problems for others lifted him to fifth place, three laps down but two places ahead of Bruce McLaren, who had impressed running second in a car powered by the BRM V12 that would replace the H16 for 1968. At Monza Spence and Irwin sandwiched three of the Cooper Maseratis in twelfth and sixteenth place on the grid. Fuel injection problems forced Irwin out after 16 laps while running tenth, Spence doing his usual job of hanging around and taking advantage of retirements to finish fifth again.

BRM skipped the Gold Cup and the teams crossed the Atlantic for the last two races of 1967. At Watkins Glen the two P83s started thirteenth and fourteenth and retired well short of half-distance on laps 35 and 41, both with engine problems. The Mexican Grand Prix would be the last race for the P83, with Spence qualifying twelfth and Irwin fifteenth. Irwin moved up to twelfth before his engine ran out of oil, while Spence, as so many times in 1967, managed to hang around until the end to claim fifth and two extra points. In the drivers' championship this moved Spence to within a point of ninth-placed Stewart, who had failed to finish a single race in the P115, while Chris Irwin's two points from France put him in joint-sixteenth place, BRM as a whole taking sixth in the Constructors' Championship. Like Graham Hill the year before, Stewart decided to leave BRM for 1968, joining Ken Tyrrell's new team, while Spence was killed at Indianapolis in May 1968 and Irwin's career was cut short by a sports car crash at the Nürburgring less than two weeks later.

== Formula One World Championship results ==
(key)

Year	Entrant	Engine/s	Tyres	Driver	1	2	3	4	5	6	7	8	9	10	11	Points	WCC
1966	Owen Racing Organisation	BRM H16	D		MON	BEL	FRA	GBR	NED	GER	ITA	USA	MEX			22^{1}	4th^{1}
1966	Owen Racing Organisation	BRM H16	D	Jackie Stewart	PO	PO					Ret	Ret	Ret			22^{1}	4th^{1}
1966	Owen Racing Organisation	BRM H16	D	Graham Hill		PO	PO				Ret	Ret	Ret			22^{1}	4th^{1}
1967	Owen Racing Organisation	BRM H16	G		RSA	MON	NED	BEL	FRA	GBR	GER	CAN	ITA	USA	MEX	17^{2}	6th^{2}
1967	Owen Racing Organisation	BRM H16	G	Jackie Stewart	Ret		Ret	2		Ret						17^{2}	6th^{2}
1967	Owen Racing Organisation	BRM H16	G	Mike Spence	Ret	6	8	5	Ret	Ret	Ret	5	5	Ret	5	17^{2}	6th^{2}
1967	Reg Parnell Racing	BRM H16	G	Chris Irwin					5	PO	9	Ret	Ret	Ret	Ret	17^{2}	6th^{2}

^1 All points scored by BRM P261 cars.
^2 Includes four points scored by BRM P261 cars.

== Formula One Non-championship results ==
(key)

Year	Entrant	Engine	Tyres	Drivers	1	2	3	4	5	6
1966	Owen Racing Organisation	BRM H16			RSA	SYR	INT	OUL		
1966	Owen Racing Organisation	BRM H16		Graham Hill				Ret		
1966	Owen Racing Organisation	BRM H16		Jackie Stewart				Ret		
1967	Owen Racing Organisation	BRM H16			ROC	SPC	INT	SYR	OUL	ESP
1967	Owen Racing Organisation	BRM H16		Jackie Stewart		Ret	Ret			
1967	Owen Racing Organisation	BRM H16		Mike Spence		6				
1967	Reg Parnell Racing	BRM H16		Mike Spence	7^{1}					

^1 Parnell Racing ran the works car for this race.

== After Formula One ==
Of the three chassis built, two were later modified for use in Formula 5000. The first chassis to be completed, 8301, was fitted with a Ford V8 taken from a GT40 and entered by Colin Crabbe in a 1969 F5000 race at Mallory Park although he did not start the race due to an engine failure. Terry Sanger raced the car in a further five F5000 races that year, finishing each time and picking up two sixth places. Chassis 8303 was fitted with a 3.5 litre Rover V8 and made a one-off appearance in the hands of Peter Gerrish at Hockenheim in 1971 but retired, again due to engine failure. A T83 driven by Bobbie Bell won the first three rounds of the 1973 BRDC Formula Libre championship fitted with a 5.7 litre Ford V8.
