= BRM P75 =

BRM P75 H-16
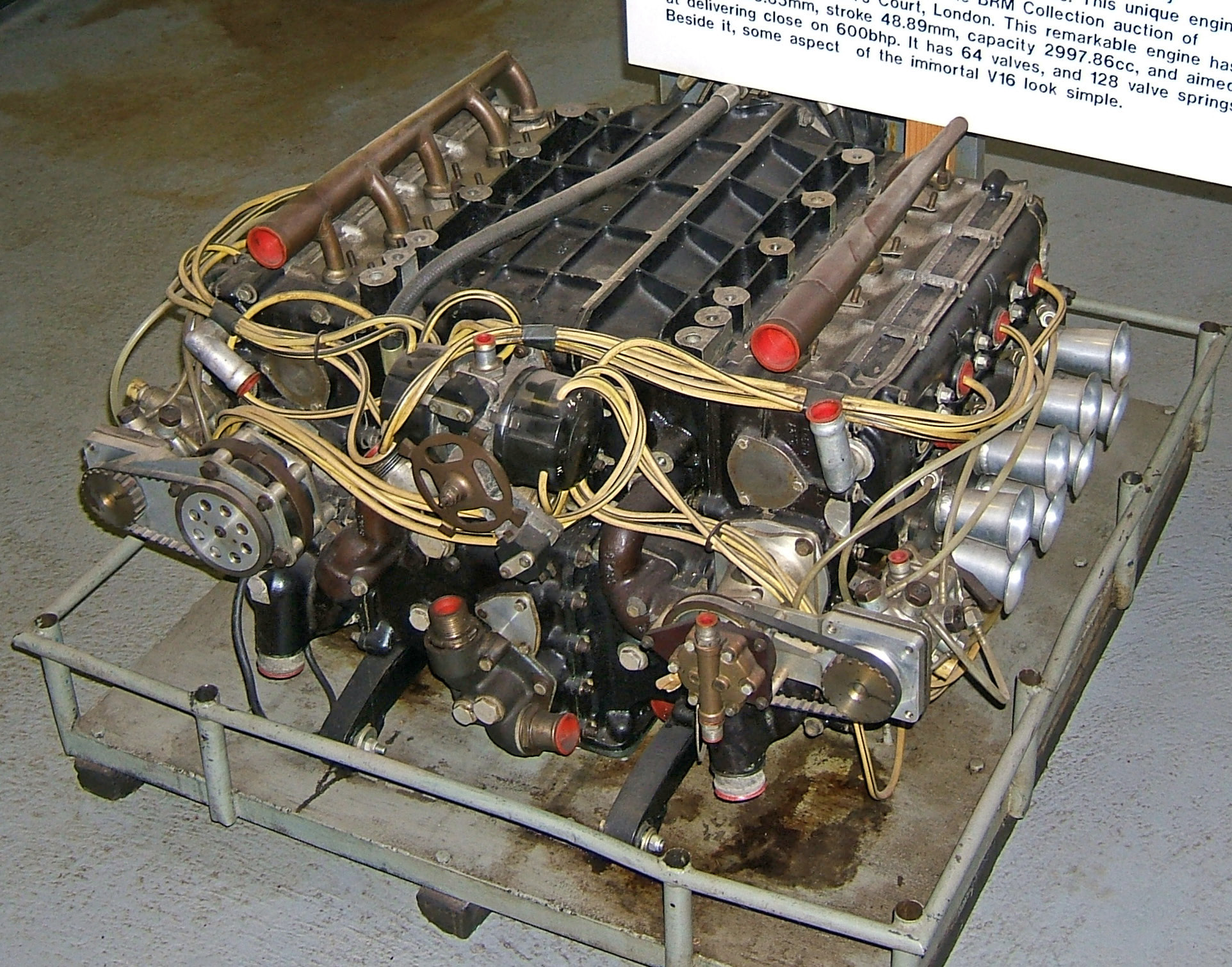

Overview
- Manufacturer: (United Kingdom) BRM
- Production: 1966-1968

Layout
- Configuration: 180° H16
- Displacement: 3.0 L (2,996 cc)
- Cylinder bore: 2.75 in (69.8 mm)
- Piston stroke: 1.93 in (48.9 mm)
- Valvetrain: 32-valve to 64-valve, DOHC, two-valves per cylinder to four-valves per cylinder

Combustion
- Turbocharger: N/A
- Fuel system: Fuel injection
- Fuel type: Gasoline
- Cooling system: Water-cooled

Output
- Power output: 390–440 bhp (291–328 kW; 395–446 PS)
- Torque output: 248–275 lb⋅ft (336–373 N⋅m)

Dimensions
- Dry weight: 400–555 lb (181–252 kg)

Chronology
- Predecessor: P56/P60
- Successor: P101

The BRM P75 was a 3-litre (183 cu. in.) H16 motor racing engine, developed by BRM. The engine was relatively competitive but highly unreliable, and was used in Formula One from 1966 to 1968.

== Background ==
=== Regulation changes ===
In 1965, the Fédération Internationale de l'Automobile, that administered Formula One racing, agreed to raise the series' maximum engine capacity from 1.5 litres (92 cu in) to 3.0 litres (183 cu in) from 1966. Up until that point, BRM was challenging at the top with Lotus, Cooper and Ferrari.

=== Development ===
BRM decided to hedge their bets by developing their existing 16 valve 1.5 litre V8 into a 32 valve 3 litre H16 (effectively two flat 8s, one on top of the other and geared together) while also developing a new 48 valve 3 litre V12 in partnership with Harry Weslake and opt for whichever turned out to be the better powerplant. After much debate, Sir Alfred Owen decided BRM would go with the H16 and Weslake bought out BRM's involvement in the V12 and produced the engine that went on to power the Eagle T1G. The H16's development was complicated by BRM's involvement in two further V12 designs and a 4.2 litre version of the H16 for Lotus to use at the 1966 Indianapolis 500.

=== Reliability ===
Various crankshaft vibration problems dogged the engine from the start, and to compound matters quick-fix balancing weights attached to the crankshafts developed the unfortunate habit of detaching themselves and flying off within the engines causing several catastrophic engine failures. Each side of the engine had to have its own water radiator, fuel metering unit, distributor and water pump, with a common oil radiator. The first sign of trouble with the H16 came when the new engine arrived at the Team Lotus factory in Hethel, Norfolk and it required four men to lift it from the BRM truck to get into the Lotus factory. The sheer complexity of the engine led to a truly terrible record of unreliability with engine, transmission and related problems caused 27 of the powerplant's 30 retirements from 40 races.

The initial 32 valve engine produced 390 brake horsepower (290 kW) at 10,250 RPM, with a later 64 valve variant raising this to 420 brake horsepower (310 kW) at 10,500 RPM. While these constituted reasonable figures compared to the Ferrari, Honda and Weslake V12s and the Cosworth V8 of 1967, the H16 had an extremely narrow power band and was by some distance the heaviest engine on the grid, starting out weighing 555 pounds (252 kg) when introduced in 1966 with the final lightweight version lowering this to 398 pounds (181 kg).

== Formula One World Championship results ==
(key) (Races in bold indicate pole position) (Races in italics indicate fastest lap)

Year	Entrant	Chassis	Tyre	Drivers	1	2	3	4	5	6	7	8	9	10	11	12	Points	WCC
1966	Owen Racing Organisation	BRM P83	D		MON	BEL	FRA	GBR	NED	GER	ITA	USA	MEX				22	4th
1966	Owen Racing Organisation	BRM P83	D	Jackie Stewart	PO	PO					Ret	Ret	Ret				22	4th
1966	Owen Racing Organisation	BRM P83	D	Graham Hill		PO	PO				Ret	Ret	Ret				22	4th
1966	Team Lotus	Lotus 43	F	Peter Arundell		DNS	Ret										13	5th
1966	Team Lotus	Lotus 43	F	Jim Clark							Ret	1	Ret				13	5th
1967	Owen Racing Organisation	BRM P83	G		RSA	MON	NED	BEL	FRA	GBR	GER	CAN	ITA	USA	MEX		17	6th
1967	Owen Racing Organisation	BRM P83	G	Mike Spence	Ret	6	8	5	Ret	Ret	Ret	5	5	Ret	5		17	6th
1967	Owen Racing Organisation	BRM P83	G	Jackie Stewart	Ret		Ret	2		Ret							17	6th
1967	Owen Racing Organisation	BRM P115	G	Jackie Stewart							Ret	Ret	Ret	Ret	Ret		17	6th
1967	Reg Parnell Racing	BRM P83	G	Chris Irwin					5	PO	9	Ret	Ret	Ret	Ret		17	6th
1967	Team Lotus	Lotus 43	F	Jim Clark	Ret												6	8th
1967	Team Lotus	Lotus 43	F	Graham Hill	Ret												6	8th
1968	Owen Racing Organisation	BRM P115	G		RSA	ESP	MON	BEL	NED	FRA	GBR	GER	ITA	CAN	USA	MEX	28	5th
1968	Owen Racing Organisation	BRM P115	G	Mike Spence	Ret												28	5th
