= Louis Stanley =

Formula One team owner, journalist, author and hotel manager

- Born: Louis Thomas Stanley; 6 January 1912; Wallasey, Cheshire, UK
- Died: 8 January 2004 (aged 92); Trumpington, Cambridgeshire, UK
- Occupations: Company director Journalist; Author
- Years active: c.1960–1977 (as team principal of BRM)
- Known for: Chair of BRM Formula One team

Louis Thomas Stanley (6 January 1912 – 8 January 2004) was the chair of the Formula One team BRM. He was married to Jean, the sister of Sir Alfred Owen. Owen was proprietor of the BRM team from the early 1950s to 1974.

== Biography ==
Stanley studied theology at Emmanuel College, Cambridge. He worked as a journalist for Queen magazine and was a manager at The Dorchester Hotel in London. He attended the 1959 Monaco Grand Prix with his wife, and as a result became interested in motor racing. Alfred Owen did not attend Sunday races for religious reasons and Stanley and his wife became his representatives at meetings. After the 1960 Dutch Grand Prix, in which a spectator, in a prohibited area, died after Dan Gurney crashed his BRM, Stanley re-organised the team, easing disquiet felt by the drivers. His subsequent promotion of Tony Rudd proved a positive move as BRM secured the Constructors' Championship in 1962, together with the World Drivers' Championship for Graham Hill. This however, was a high point in the team's existence and it could not compete with the Cosworth-powered cars of the later 1960s and 1970s. In the 1970s, the team competed as Stanley-BRM, after the Owen Organisation withdrew its support, but despite arranging innovative sponsorship deals with Marlboro and Yardley, Stanley could not arrest the team's decline.

Stanley was instrumental in establishing the Formula One mobile medical unit which for the first time provided good standard medical facilities at circuits. When Jackie Stewart was injured, driving for BRM, in 1966, both he and Stanley were unimpressed with the medical help available at the circuit. Stanley became a strong ally of Stewart in his campaign to improve safety and created the International Grand Prix Medical Service in 1967. Stanley himself funded the mobile medical unit, which was made available to GP circuits in Europe. After Jo Siffert was killed whilst driving for BRM at Brands Hatch in 1971, Stanley personally tested fireproof suits and oversaw the training of fire marshalls.

Stanley was honorary secretary and treasurer of the Grand Prix Drivers' Association in its original form and was also a prolific author.

== Personal life ==
Stanley was married twice; firstly, to Kate Furness (two sons) from whom he was divorced in 1949. In 1955 he married Jean Baber (née Owen) who had four children from her previous marriage. Jean Stanley died in June 2002.

Stanley died on 8 January 2004, aged 92, at Trumpington, Cambridgeshire following a stroke.
