= Lotus 43 =

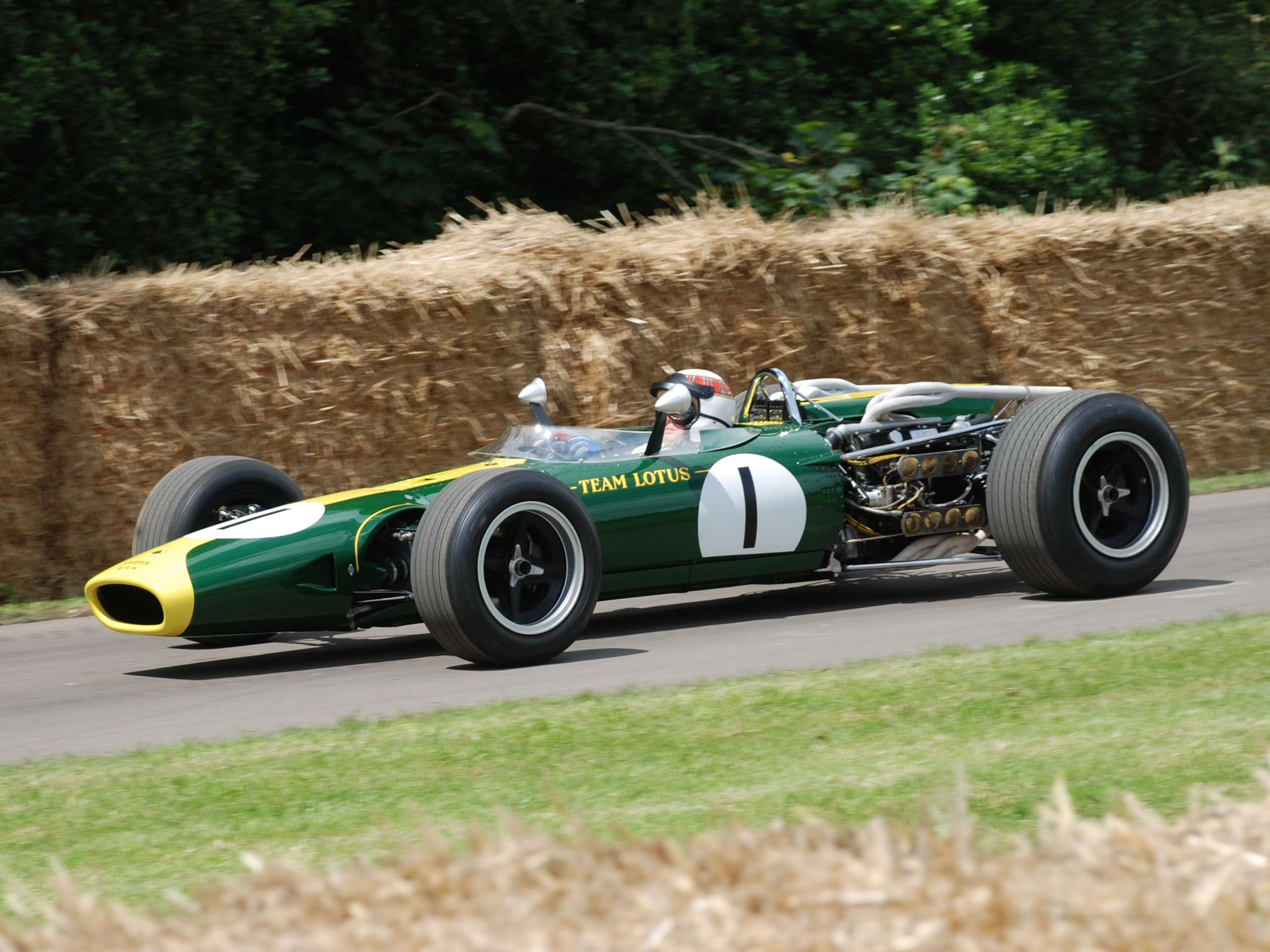
- Category: Formula One
- Constructor: Team Lotus
- Designers: Colin Chapman; Maurice Philippe
- Predecessor: Lotus 33
- Successor: Lotus 49

Technical specifications
- Chassis: Aluminium monocoque
- Suspension (front): top rocker arms, lower wishbones, inboard coil springs over dampers
- Suspension (rear): reverse lower wishbones, twin radius arms, coil springs over dampers, anti-roll bar
- Engine: BRM P75; 2,996 cc (183 cu in) H16 Naturally aspirated
- Transmission: BRM T82 6-speed manual
- Weight: 563 kg (1,241 lb)
- Fuel: Esso
- Tyres: Firestone

Competition history
- Notable entrants: Team Lotus
- Notable drivers: (United Kingdom) Peter Arundell (United Kingdom) Jim Clark (United Kingdom) Graham Hill
- Debut: 1966 Belgian Grand Prix
- Last event: 1967 South African Grand Prix
Races	Wins	Podiums	Poles	F/Laps
5	1	1	0	0
- Constructors' Championships: 0
- Drivers' Championships: 0

The Lotus 43 was a Formula One racing car designed by Colin Chapman and Maurice Philippe for the 1966 season. Hampered by its heavy and unreliable BRM engine, it won only one race, the 1966 United States Grand Prix.

== Concept ==
The Lotus 43 was partially based on the Lotus 38 Indycar, designed by Len Terry, due to Lotus's experience at Indy with larger engine capacity and tyre/suspension setup. The car was designed in this way in response to new F1 regulations which came into force in 1966, which increased the engine capacity to 3 litres. Along with newer, wider tyres better able to handle the power of the larger engines, the need for a more robust design was obvious.

Cosworth were developing a new engine for Lotus, the DFV, to be introduced for the 1967 Formula One season, and in the meantime Chapman made a deal for use of the BRM P75 H16 engine. The P75 on paper was technically advanced and powerful, and Chapman had hopes that it would power his cars to another successful season.

The first sign of trouble was when the H16 engine arrived at the Team Lotus factory in Hethel, Norfolk and it required four men to lift it from the truck. The engine proved to be overweight, unreliable and was unable to produce the promised power.

Engine problems aside, the 43 chassis was considered an excellent design and elements of it were used in its 1967 successor, the far more successful Lotus 49, including the use of the engine as a stressed structural member which bore weight and to which the rear suspension was attached.

== Racing history ==
=== 1966 ===
The car was supposed to debut at the 1966 Monaco Grand Prix, driven by Peter Arundell, but it was unavailable. Its first outing at the following Belgian Grand Prix ended during practice, when the engine gave out.

The 43 reappeared at the Italian Grand Prix but retired with gearbox failure. Clark then won the United States Grand Prix at Watkins Glen, the only race win for the P75 engine, using a spare engine loaned by the BRM team. However, gearbox failure again led to the 43's retirement from the final race of the season, the Mexican Grand Prix.

=== 1967 ===
In 1967 the 43 made its final appearance at the South African Grand Prix at the Kyalami circuit, where Clark and new team mate Graham Hill both retired their cars.

Only two cars were built and were later sold to Robert Lamplough and Jock Russell, who fitted them with 4.7 litre Ford V8 engines and competed in Formula 5000 events.

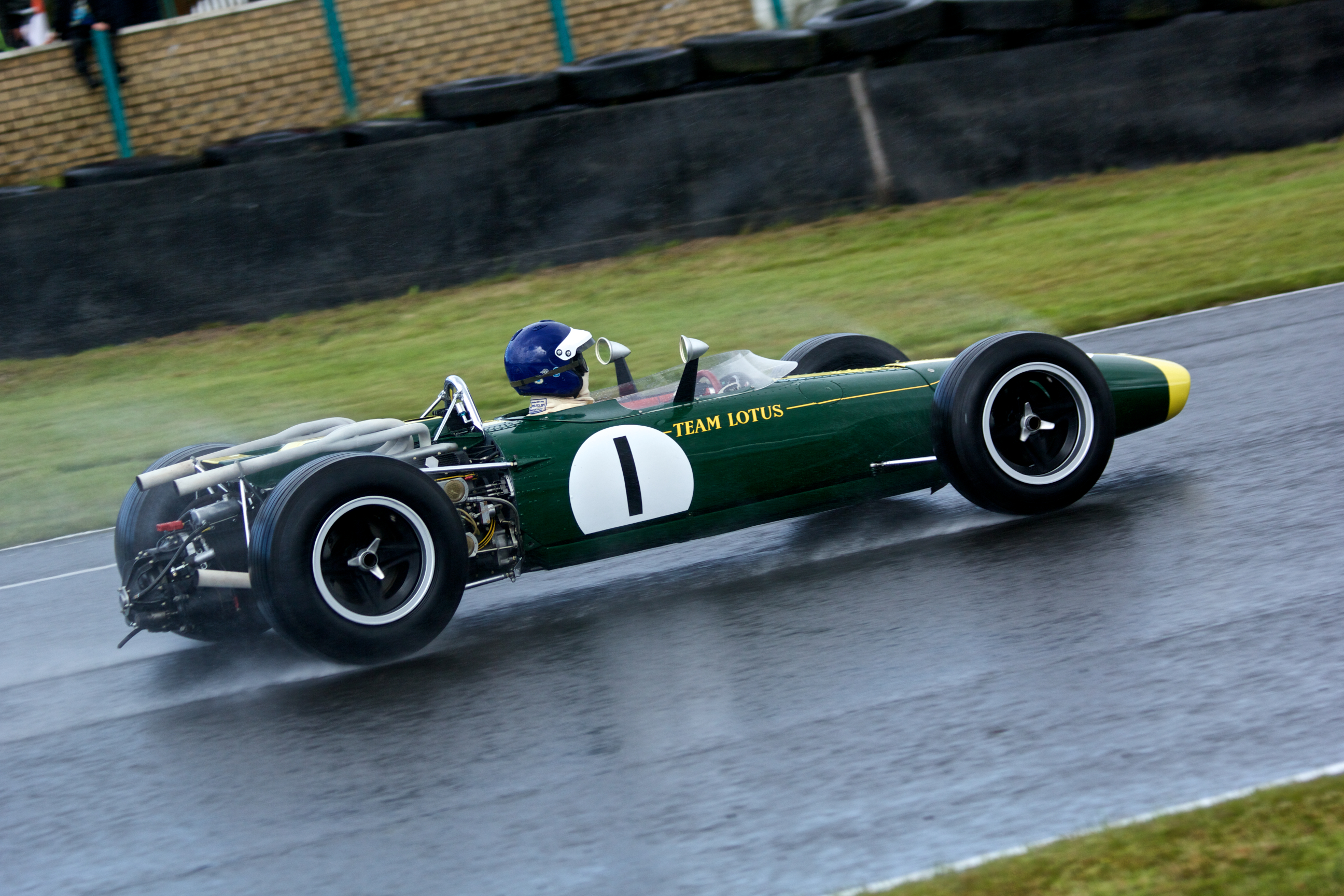
Lotus 43 at the BTCC Knockhill 2014

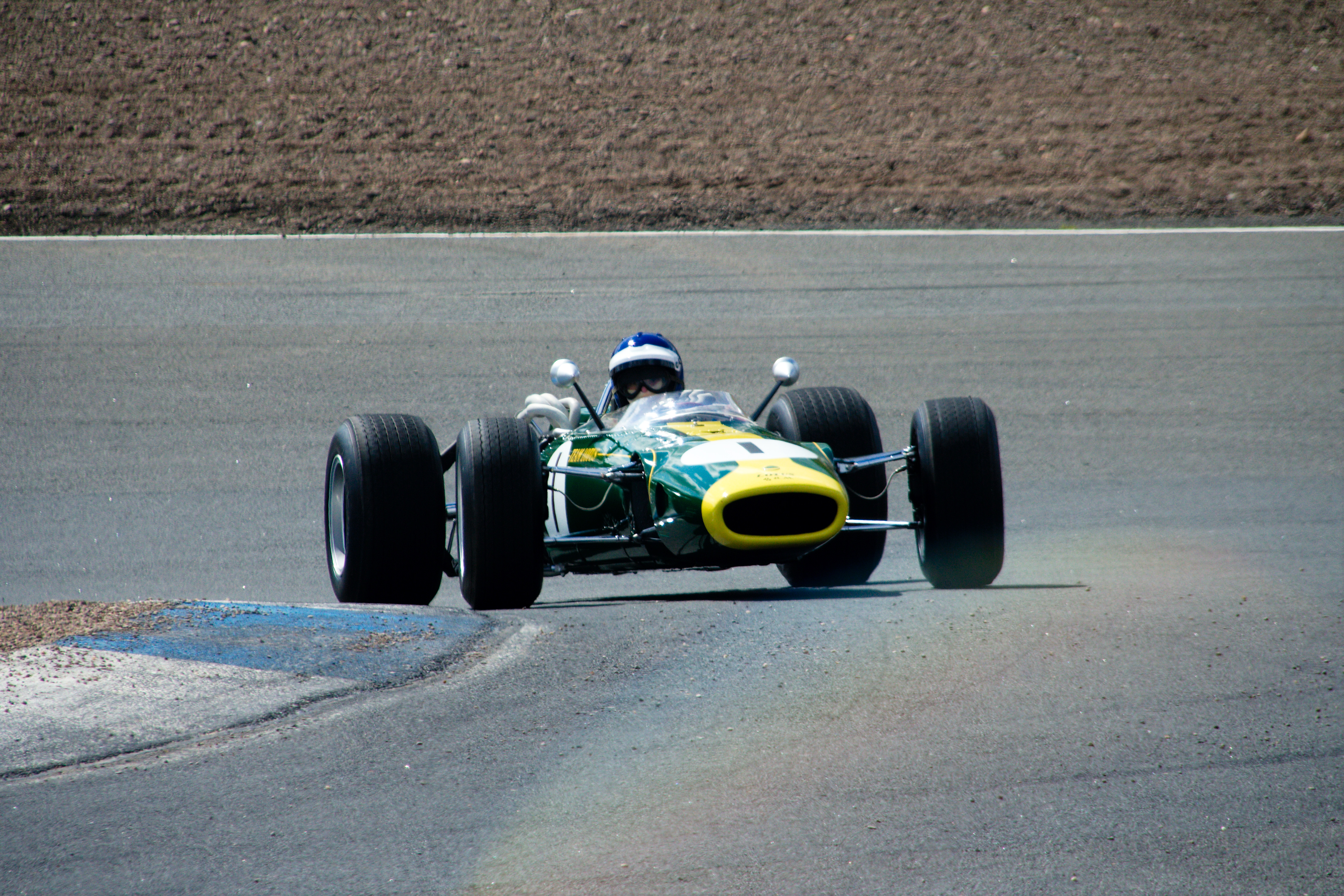
Lotus 43 being demonstrated in 2014

== Complete results ==
=== Formula One World Championship results ===
(key)

Year	Entrant	Engine	Tyres	Drivers	1	2	3	4	5	6	7	8	9	10	11	Points	WCC
1966	Team Lotus	BRM P75 3.0 H16	F		MON	BEL	FRA	GBR	NED	GER	ITA	USA	MEX			13^{1}	5th
1966	Team Lotus	BRM P75 3.0 H16	F	Peter Arundell		DNS	Ret									13^{1}	5th
1966	Team Lotus	BRM P75 3.0 H16	F	Jim Clark							Ret	1	Ret			13^{1}	5th
1967	Team Lotus	BRM P75 3.0 H16	F		RSA	MON	NED	BEL	FRA	GBR	GER	CAN	ITA	USA	MEX	6^{2}	8th
1967	Team Lotus	BRM P75 3.0 H16	F	Jim Clark	Ret											6^{2}	8th
1967	Team Lotus	BRM P75 3.0 H16	F	Graham Hill	Ret											6^{2}	8th

^1 Total points scored by all Lotus-BRM cars, including 4 points scored by drivers of Lotus 33 variants.
^2 Total points scored by all Lotus-BRM cars, including 6 points scored by drivers of Lotus 33 variants.

=== Non-championship Formula One results ===
(key)

Year	Entrant	Engine	Tyres	Drivers	1	2	3	4
1966	Team Lotus	BRM P75 3.0 H16	F		RSA	SYR	INT	OUL
1966	Team Lotus	BRM P75 3.0 H16	F	Jim Clark				DNS

== PC simulation ==
A driveable, detailed reconstruction of the Lotus 43 (with matching car physics) appeared in 2007 in the freely-available '66 Mod' for the PC-based racing simulation Grand Prix Legends.
