= Alfred Owen =

British business executive

Sir Alfred George Beech Owen
- Born: 8 April 1908
- Died: 29 October 1975 (aged 67)
- Education: Emmanuel College, Cambridge

Sir Alfred George Beech Owen (8 April 1908 – 29 October 1975) was the son of Alfred Ernest Owen (who in 1910 became the sole-proprietor of the British engineering company Rubery Owen & Co).

== Biography ==
Sir Alfred was educated at Emmanuel College, Cambridge, and after the death of his father in 1929 he became, jointly with his brother, managing director of the Rubery Owen Group.

Following his father's death, Owen left his studies at Cambridge to take over the Rubery Owen Company, the biggest private family business in Britain. Besides being chairman and joint managing director of Rubery Owen and Co. Ltd. he was also on the board of ninety-nine companies and chairman of over eighty.

He held thirty voluntary offices in social work, twenty in church work as well as being a lay reader in the Anglican Church for much of his life.

Sir Alfred was prominent in the local affairs of his hometown, The Royal Town of Sutton Coldfield, serving as a councillor (1937–1974), mayor (1951) and alderman. Between 1951 and 1952 he was the mayor of Sutton Coldfield and received his knighthood in 1961. In 1970 Alderman Sir Alfred Owen was made Freeman of the Borough of Sutton Coldfield, and was the last person to hold this honour.

Owen had a passion for racing cars and track events. He sponsored the Formula One BRM racing cars and received the Ferodo trophy as the man who had done the most for British racing in 1963. He was proprietor of the BRM motor racing team from the early-1950s to 1974, when it was passed to Louis Stanley, who had married his sister Jean.

His father had bought the New Hall Manor estate in Sutton Coldfield in 1923 which remained the Owen family home until Sir Alfred's death in 1975.

Sir Alfred died on 29 October 1975 aged 67, leaving New Hall empty. He is buried with his family in Sutton Coldfield Cemetery, next to Good Hope Hospital on Rectory Road. The Rubery Owen Group spent several years looking for a use for New Hall, including offering it to the National Trust, before it was eventually put up for sale.

== Legacy ==
A blue plaque appears at New Hall, now a hotel, in recognition of the occupation by Sir Alfred.
