= Tony Rudd =

British motor racing engineer (1923–2003)

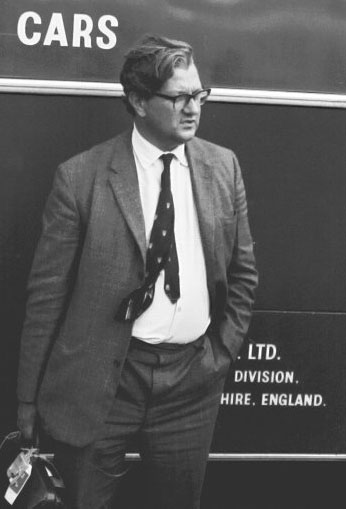
- Rudd at a Formula 1 race in 1967
- Born: 8 March 1923; Stony Stratford, United Kingdom
- Died: 22 August 2003 (aged 80)
- Children: 3
- Engineering career
- Employers: BRM (1951-1969); Lotus (1969-1989)

Anthony Cyril Rudd (8 March 1923 – 22 August 2003) was a British engineer involved in aero engine design and motor racing, with particular associations with BRM and Lotus.

== Early life and engineering apprenticeship ==
Rudd became involved with motor racing in the 1930s when he became an informal assistant to Prince Chula and Prince Bira's White Mouse Racing team. This inspired him to take up engineering as a career and family influence led him to take up an apprenticeship at Rolls-Royce in early 1939, where Rudd was to stay through the war years.

Rudd's engineering studies were accelerated by the outbreak of the Second World War during which he rotated through the various departments as normal, and at the two year mark the Selection Board put him in Motor Car Design, then run by the Chief Technical and Development Engineer, W.R. Harvey Bailey, the designer of the Falcon aero engine in WW1. After a short time there he was made assistant to George Hancock, with whom his job was to review all the failure reports and correlate and analyse to improve repair outcomes and extract information to rebut service criticisms. By the summer of 1944, Rudd was effectively running the Defects Investigation Department until it was merged with the Repair Technical Office - but there were few defects to investigate. From the latter half of 1944 Rudd was preparing to go with Tiger Force to the Northwest Pacific when the war ended.

After the end of the war, many staff from Rolls Royce Derby were moved to Hucknall to assist in Rolls-Royce's efforts in the civil air transport market - Rudd moved to the Merlin Programme but suggests strongly in his autobiography that he was distracted by the motor racing scene in which he was becoming enmeshed. Rumours abounded within Rolls-Royce about the difficulties BRM were having with the Rolls-Royce supplied supercharger installation, and there was talk of a RR engineer being 'posted' to BRM, a responsibility that was offered to Rudd.

== Career ==
=== Arrival at BRM ===
The much-delayed BRM V16 engine was fitted with Rolls-Royce superchargers and Rudd was seconded to BRM in 1951 to assist with their development, originally "for three or four months". He never returned to Rolls-Royce, becoming part of the BRM team for almost two decades. Rudd was involved in the development of the V16 and four-cylinder P25 cars and started to assume more prominence after the Rubery-Owen takeover of the team. Peter Berthon and Raymond Mays were eventually sidelined after the drivers threatened to strike and Rudd assumed full technical control of the team in 1960.

=== Successes at BRM ===
Rudd put in place proper engineering procedures within the team. Rudd drove a monocoque Killeen car at Folkingham and increased his interest in vehicle rigidity. His spaceframe and monocoque V8-engined designs took BRM to 1 constructors' and 1 drivers' World Championships. However, his H-16 engine for the new three litre formula (based on two of the successful 1.5 litre V8s on top of each other) proved to be heavy and overcomplicated. The team struggled with the complex design and gradually lost momentum in the late Sixties. Rudd claims that the H-16 would have been successful had the drawings been followed accurately - as it was the engine had heavier castings than planned and its power-to-weight ratio was unfavourable; it also had breathing difficulties and only started to improve when it fired as a sixteen-cylinder engine rather than two eights. While the H-16 was struggling, Rudd organised for Geoff Johnson to design a compact sports-car racing V-12 for customer sale, an engine that became the foundation of renewed success in the years after Rudd's departure from BRM. As a sideline to BRM's main development, Rudd and Peter Wright were also involved with the design of a ground effect car that never raced; driver John Surtees was adamant that it could not be made raceworthy. Rudd and Wright were later to be reunited at Lotus on work that did lead to successful ground-effect racing cars.

=== The move to Lotus ===
During a poor 1969 season and after management changes at BRM, Rudd left for Lotus Cars, gradually working up to the position of Engineering Director on the road-car side of the company - he was not directly involved in racing, which Colin Chapman looked after. Rudd's achievements included the development of Lotus' own four-cylinder engine as well as improving production quality of their cars. Rudd also developed Lotus as an engineering consultancy working on high-technology projects for the rest of the automotive industry, creating another profit centre within the business.

=== Ground effect and consultancy ===
Team Lotus were struggling in the mid-1970s and Rudd led the research effort that produced ground effect Lotus 78, which brought the team back to the forefront of Grand Prix success. Rudd went back to the road-car side of the company to research active suspension, turbocharging, and lead consultancy work for other manufacturers. After Chapman's death in 1982 Rudd took on an increasingly significant role in the business but advanced engineering remained his forté.

=== Final return to racing ===
After the conviction of Fred Bushell for financial irregularities related to DeLorean, the Chapman family (who retained ownership of Team Lotus) asked Rudd to step in to head the racing team. He returned to racing for a year in 1989 until the team was sold on, then retired to become a freelance consulting engineer.

== Retirement and writing ==
In retirement, Rudd remained active in the Society of Automotive Engineers, wrote a widely acclaimed autobiography It Was Fun: My Fifty Years of High Performance and collaborated with Doug Nye on a multi-volume history of BRM. Tony Rudd died in 2003 at the age of 80. He was married to Pamela and had three daughters.

== Bibliography ==
- BRM, Raymond Mays and Peter Roberts
- BRM: The Saga of British Racing Motors, Doug Nye with Tony Rudd, MRP - Volumes 1, 2 and 3 have appeared, covering the front-engined cars, spaceframe rear engined cars and monocoque V8 cars respectively; Volume 4 will cover the H16, V12s and Can-Ams.
- It Was Fun: My Fifty Years of High Performance, Tony Rudd, MRP.
- BRM V16, How Britain's auto makers built a Grand Prix car to beat the world, By Karl Ludvigsen, Published by Veloce
