= British Racing Motors =

Formula One team

(United Kingdom) BRM
- Full name: British Racing Motors
- Base: Bourne, Lincolnshire, England
- Founder(s): Raymond Mays; Peter Berthon
- Noted staff: Alfred Owen; Louis Stanley; Jean Stanley; Tony Rudd
- Noted drivers: (Sweden) Jo Bonnier (United Kingdom) Tony Brooks (United Kingdom) Ron Flockhart (United States) Dan Gurney (United Kingdom) Mike Hawthorn (United Kingdom) Graham Hill (Austria) Niki Lauda (United Kingdom) Reg Parnell (Switzerland) Clay Regazzoni (Mexico) Pedro Rodríguez (United States) Harry Schell (Switzerland) Jo Siffert (United Kingdom) Jackie Stewart (United Kingdom) John Surtees (France) Maurice Trintignant (France) Jean-Pierre Beltoise

Formula One World Championship career
- First entry: 1951 British Grand Prix
- Races entered: 197
- Engines: BRM, Climax
- Constructors' Championships: 1 (1962)
- Drivers' Championships: 1 (1962)
- Race victories: 17
- Pole positions: 11
- Fastest laps: 15
- Final entry: 1977 Italian Grand Prix

BRM as a Formula One engine manufacturer
Formula One World Championship career
- First entry: 1951 British Grand Prix
- Last entry: 1977 Italian Grand Prix
- Races entered: 200 (189 starts)
- Chassis: BRM, Lotus, Gilby, BRP, Scirocco, Brabham, Matra, McLaren, Cooper
- Constructors' Championships: 1 (1962)
- Drivers' Championships: 1 (1962)
- Race victories: 18
- Podiums: 65
- Points: 499
- Pole positions: 11
- Fastest laps: 14

British Racing Motors (BRM) was a British Formula One motor racing team. Founded in 1945 and based in the market town of Bourne in Lincolnshire, it participated from 1951 to 1977, competing in 197 grands prix and winning seventeen. BRM won the constructors' title in 1962 when its driver Graham Hill became world champion. In 1963, 1964, 1965 and 1971, BRM came second in the constructors' competition.

== History ==
BRM was founded just after the Second World War by Raymond Mays, who had built several hillclimb and road racing cars under the ERA brand before the war, and Peter Berthon, a long-time associate. Mays' pre-war successes (and access to pre-war Mercedes-Benz and Auto Union design documents) inspired him to build an all-British grand prix car for the post-war era as a national prestige project, with financial and industrial backing from the British motor industry and its suppliers channelled through a trust fund.

This proved to be an unwieldy way of organising and financing the project, and as some of the backers withdrew, disappointed with the team's slow progress and early results, it fell to one of the partners in the trust, Alfred Owen of the Rubery Owen group of companies. Owen, whose group primarily manufactured car parts, took over the team in its entirety. Between 1954 and 1970 the team entered its works F1 cars under the official name of the Owen Racing Organisation. Berthon and Mays continued to run the team on Rubery Owen's behalf into the 1960s, before it was handed over to Louis Stanley, the husband of Sir Alfred's sister Jean Owen.

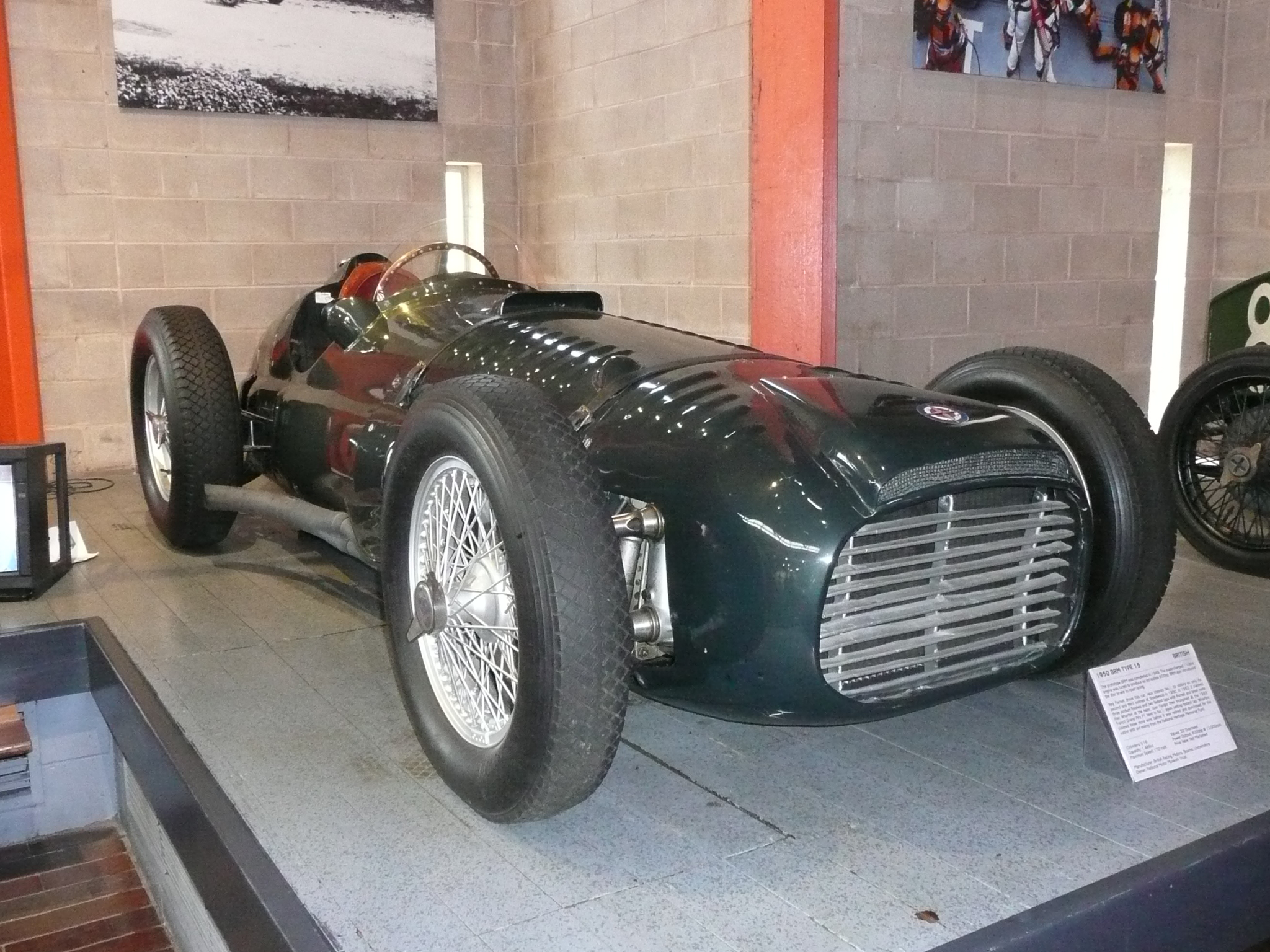
The V16-powered BRM Type 15

A factory was set up in Spalding Road, Bourne, Lincolnshire, behind Eastgate House, Mays' family home, in a building called 'The Maltings' (the adjacent former ERA works, vacated in 1939). Several people involved with ERA returned to the firm to work for BRM, including Harry Mundy and Eric Richter. The team also had access to a test facility at Folkingham aerodrome.

=== BRM V16 ===
The first post-war rules for the top level of motor racing allowed 1.5-litre supercharged or 4.5-litre normally aspirated engines. BRM's first engine design was an extremely ambitious 1.5-litre supercharged V16. Rolls-Royce was contracted to produce centrifugal superchargers, rather than the more commonly used Roots type. The design concept of the V16 had not been used extensively on automobiles before so that design problems were many and the engine did not fire for the first time until June 1949. It proved to be outstandingly powerful but its output was produced over a very limited range of engine speed, coming on suddenly if the throttle was applied carelessly, resulting in wheelspin as the narrow tyres proved unable to transfer the power to the road. This made the car very touchy to drive. Engineer Tony Rudd was seconded to BRM from Rolls-Royce to develop the supercharging system and remained involved with BRM for nearly twenty years.

The Type 15, which was the designation for the V16 car, won the first two races it actually started, the Formula Libre and Formula One events at Goodwood in September 1950, driven by Reg Parnell. However, it was never to be so successful again. The engine proved unreliable and difficult to develop, and the team were not up to the task of improving the situation. A string of failures caused much embarrassment, and the problems were still unsolved when the Commission Sportive Internationale announced in 1952 that for 1954, a new engine formula of 2.5 litres naturally aspirated or 750 cc supercharged would take effect.

Meanwhile, the organisers of all the grands prix counting for the world championship elected to run their races for Formula Two for the next two years, as Alfa Romeo had pulled out of racing and BRM were unable to present raceworthy cars, leaving no credible opposition to Ferrari other than outdated Lago-Talbots and the odd O.S.C.A. The V16s continued to race in minor Formula One races and in British Formula Libre events until the mid fifties, battles with Tony Vandervell's Thin Wall Special Ferrari 375 being a particular highlight of the British scene.

=== Crisis ===
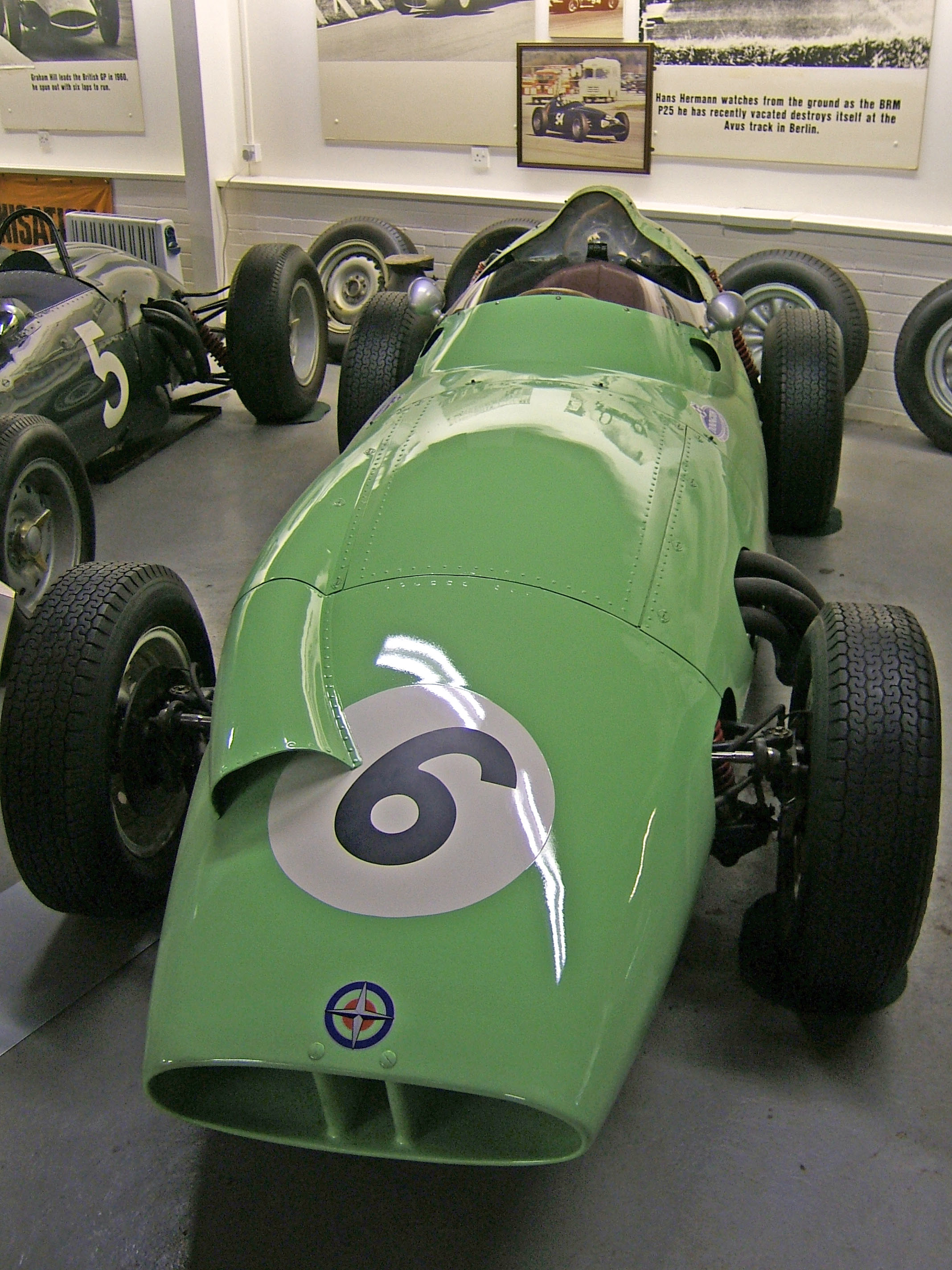
The British Racing Partnership BRM P25 with which Stirling Moss took second place in the 1959 British Grand Prix.

The Type 25 was BRM's next car. It used an extremely oversquare (4.05 x 2.95 in, 102.87 x 74.93 mm) 2.5 L atmospheric four-cylinder engine designed by Stewart Tresilian and (as became typical with BRM) it arrived late and took a lot of development; it was so late that the Owen Organisation started the 2.5 L formula with a Maserati 250F. The P25 was initially unsuccessful, not winning a race until a victory at the Dutch Grand Prix in 1959. Colin Chapman helped to improve the car in 1956. Stirling Moss believed that the BRM engine was superior to the Coventry-Climax unit used in his Cooper, and a P25 was briefly run in 1959 by the British Racing Partnership, for Moss (and also Hans Herrmann), and Rob Walker also backed the construction of a Cooper-BRM to gain access to the engine.

The P25 was becoming highly competitive just as the rear-engined Cooper started to become dominant; the P48 was a quick reaction to this, using major components from the P25 but in rear-engined format. The P48 was revised for the 1.5 L rules in 1961, but once again BRM's own engine was not ready and the cars had to run with a Coventry-Climax four-cylinder unit in adapted P48 chassis, achieving very little in terms of results.

The firm moved to a purpose-built workshop on an adjoining site in the spring of 1960, but when the 1.5-litre atmospheric Formula One regulation was introduced in 1961, Alfred Owen was threatening to pull the plug unless race victories were achieved very soon.

=== Champions ===
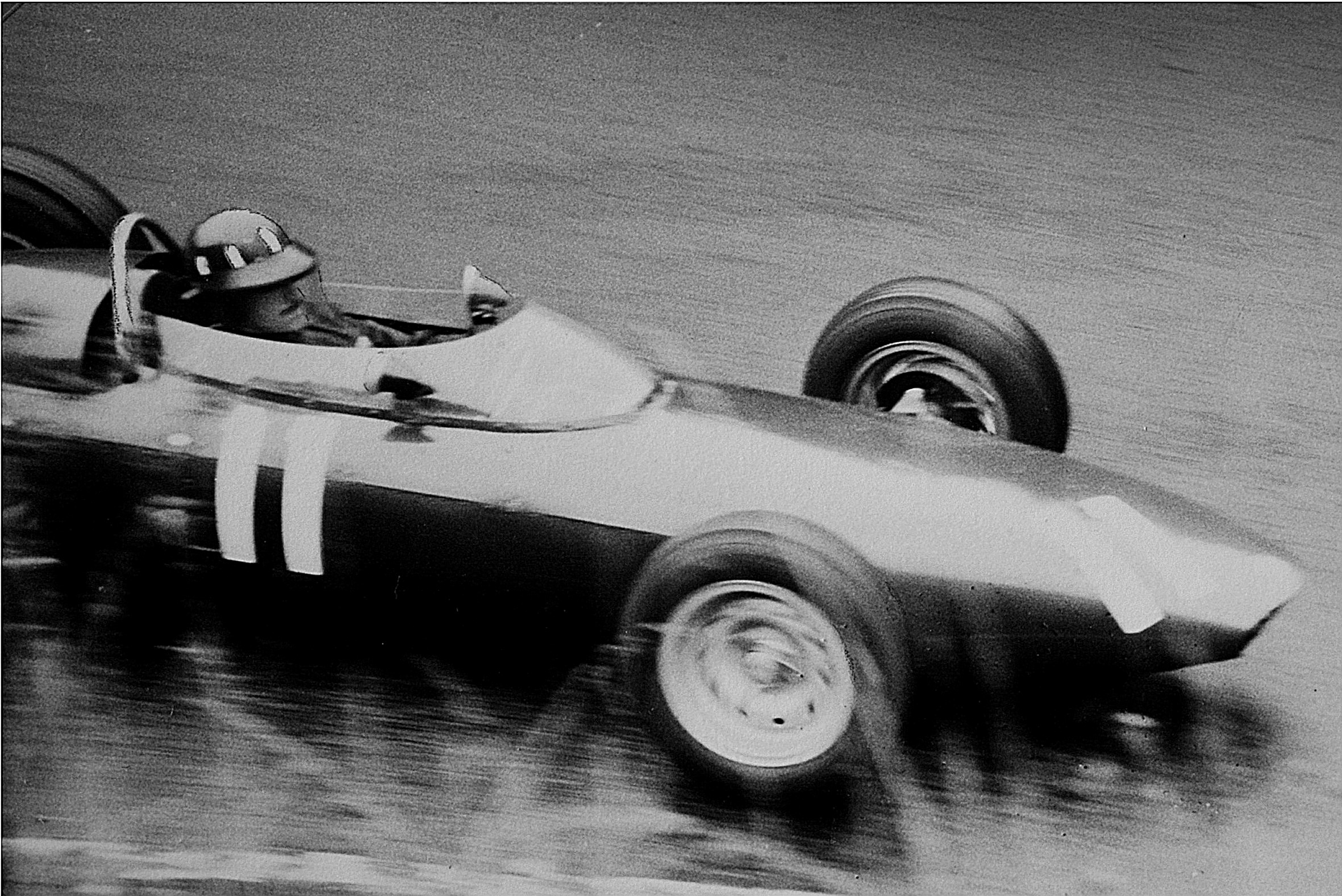
Graham Hill with BRM 1962 at the Nürburgring

By the end of the 1961 season BRM had managed to build an engine designed by Peter Berthon and Aubrey Woods (BRM P56 V8) (2.6975 x 2.0 in, 68.5 x 50.8 mm) which was on a par with the Dino V6 used by Ferrari and the Coventry Climax V8 used by other British teams. However, the real change was the promotion by Owen of an engineer who had been with the team since 1950 (originally on secondment from Rolls-Royce to look after the supercharging on the V16), Tony Rudd, to the position of chief development engineer. Rudd was the first professional engineer to exercise full technical control over the team, and basic engineering and reliability problems which had plagued the team for years began to vanish. He was given greater responsibility in 1960 after two of the drivers, Graham Hill and Dan Gurney, went on strike and told Alfred Owen they would not drive again, and in early 1962 full executive authority was given to Tony Rudd. Raymond Mays and Peter Berthon were sidelined. The team had designed their first mid-engined car for 1960, matching the other teams, and won the World Drivers' Championship with Graham Hill as driver, in 1962 with the P57. (During 1962, BRM also ran Lucas electronic ignition.) During 1965, 210 bhp (160 kW) at 11,000 rpm was the rated power. However at the high-speed 1965 Italian GP (Monza) an uprated version was raced with 220 bhp (160 kW) at 11,750 rpm for short bursts. A planned 4-valve-per-cylinder version in cooperation with Weslake Engineering never materialised.

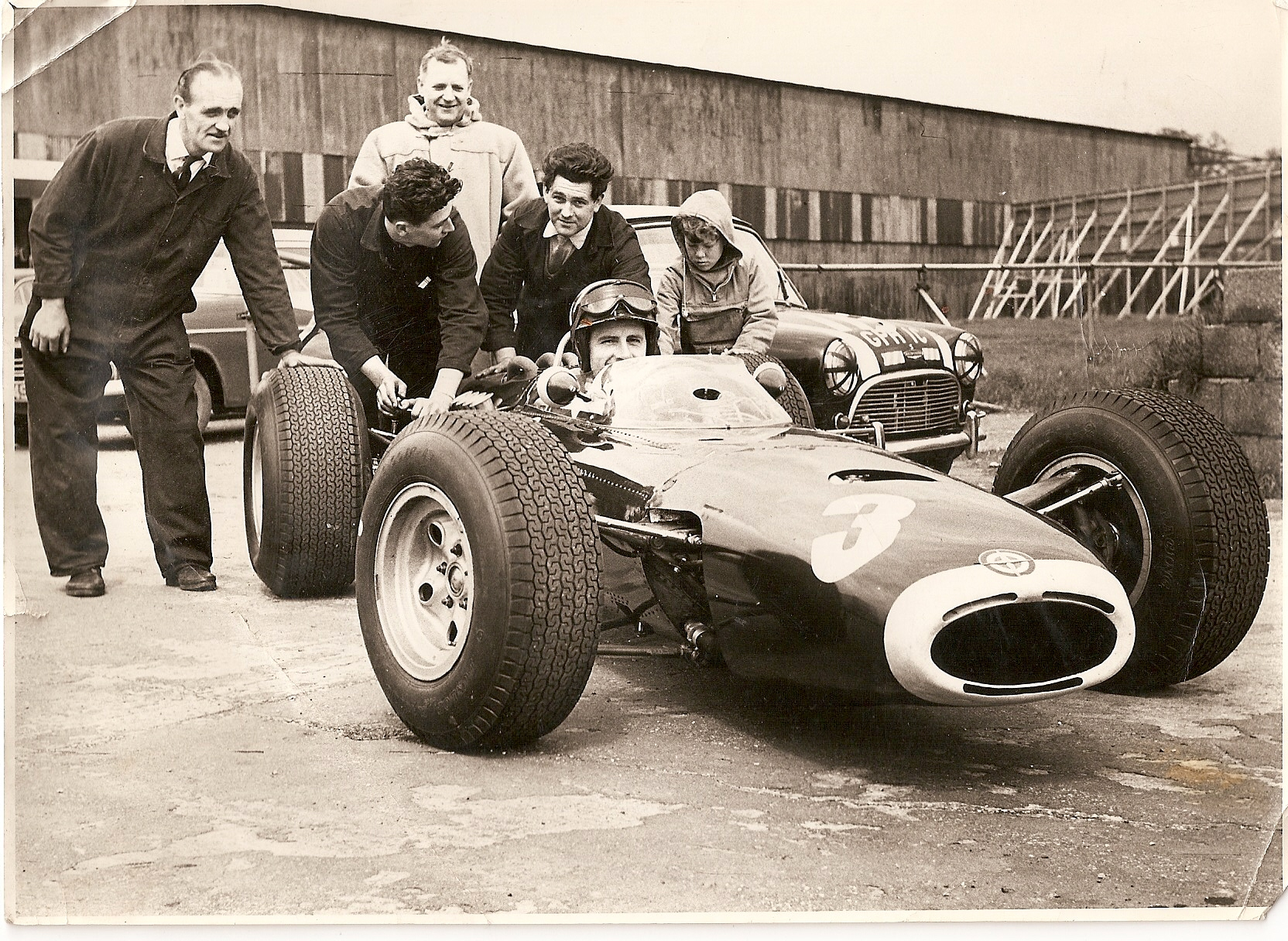
Graham Hill in BRM P261, testing at Silverstone in 1965. Chassis designer John Crosthwaite in duffel coat

1962 BRM P578 at Goodwood Festival of Speed 2010

As part of Owen's attempt to make BRM pay its way, the V8 engine was sold to privateers and appeared in a number of other chassis during the 1.5 L formula, particularly in private Lotus chassis and in smaller marques such as BRP.

A number of privateers acquired 1961 and 1962 BRMs during this period, including Maurice Trintignant and Scuderia Centro Sud; these cars continued to race for many years.

The monocoque BRM P261 V8 car was soon developed and these ran on through the 1.5-litre formula and performed useful service in the early races of the subsequent 3.0-litre formula. In 1965 Jackie Stewart was signed to partner Hill; he took his first grand prix win at Monza in his debut season, and won the first world championship race of the new three-litre formula with a car fitted with a Tasman two-litre V8; once again BRM were not ready for the start of a new formula and the old cars continued to be used, even on occasion after the H16 was ready.

=== BRM H16 ===
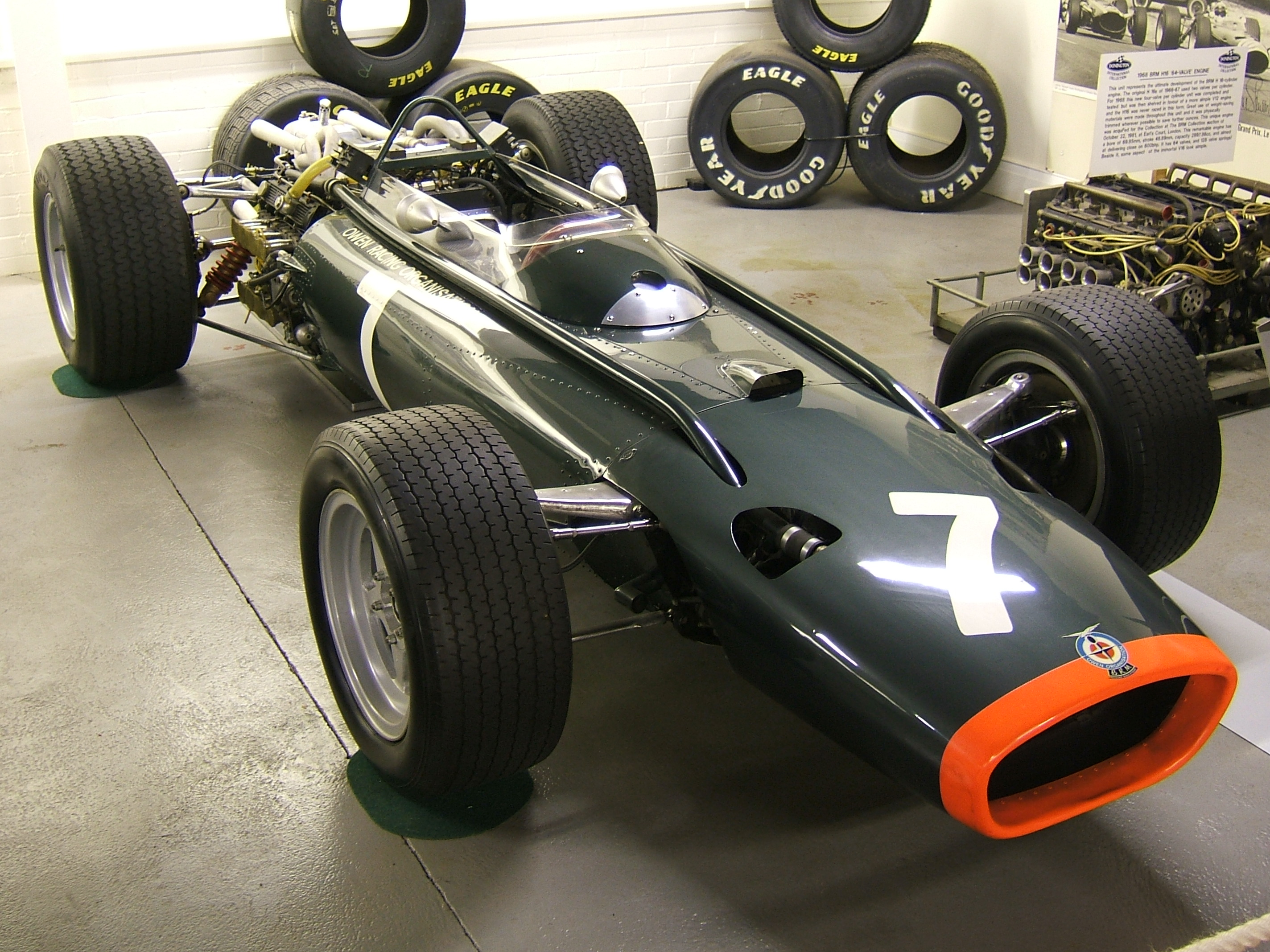
A BRM P83, the only BRM model which ran successfully with the BRM P75 H16 engine. Note position of inlet trumpets and cam covers on the side of the H16 engine.

For 1966, the engine regulations changed to permit three-litre atmospheric (or 1.5-litre supercharged) engines. BRM refused Peter Berthon and Aubrey Woods's proposal to build a V12, and instead built an ingenious but very complicated engine, designed by Tony Rudd and Geoff Johnson, the H16 (BRM P75), which essentially used two flat-eight engines (derived from their 1.5L V8) one above the other, with the crankshafts geared together.

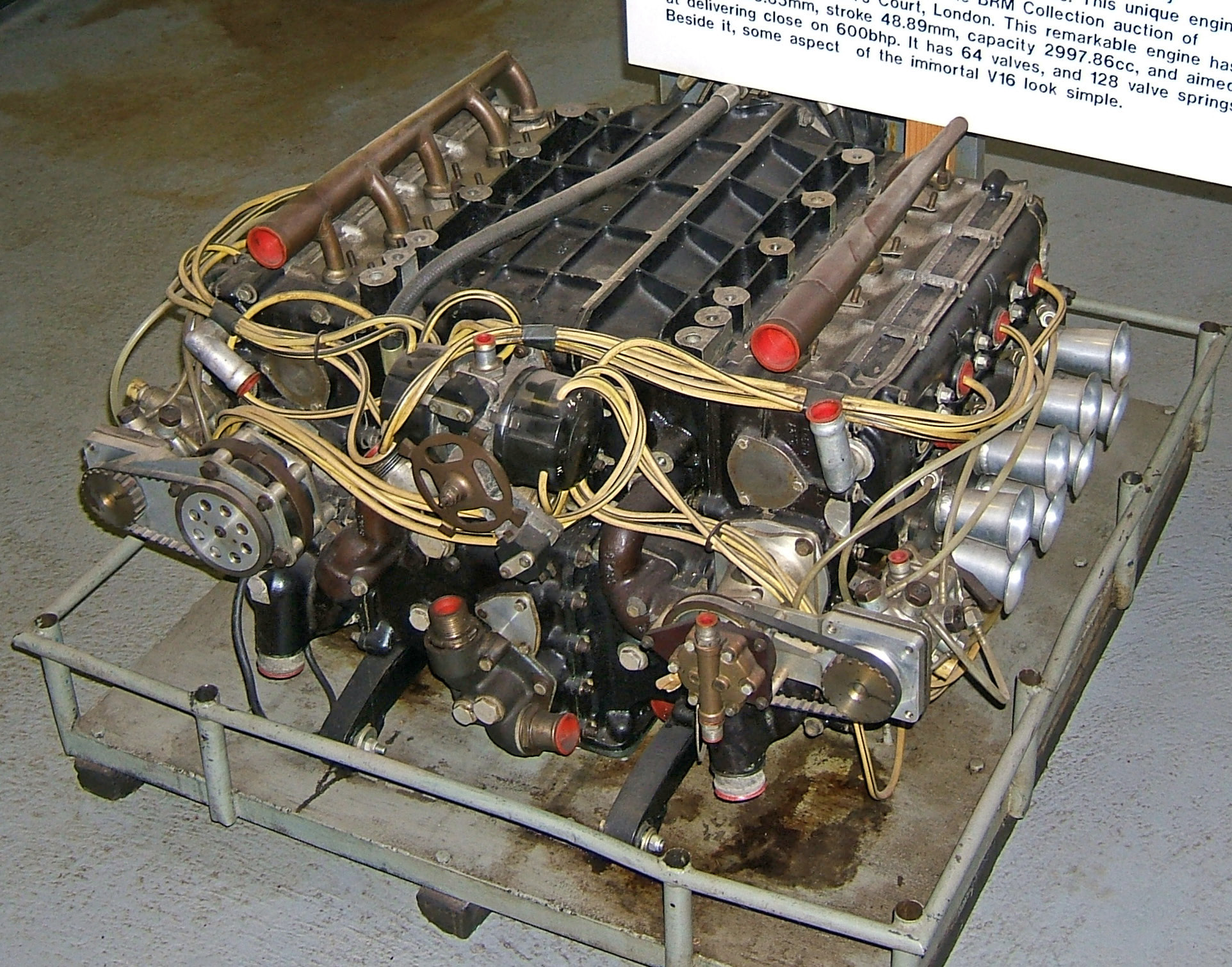
A BRM P75 H16 engine, the final, 1968, 64-valve incarnation of the design.

BRM found the H16 (2.75 x 1.925 in, 69.85 x 48.895 mm) attractive because it was initially planned to share design elements and components with the successful 1.5-litre V8. While the engine was powerful, it was also heavy and unreliable – Rudd claimed that his drawings were not followed accurately and many of the castings were much thicker and heavier than he had specified (when Lotus took delivery of their first H16 it took six men to carry it from the van to the workshop). At that time, BRM earned the nickname of "British Racing Misery". BRM, Lotus, and various privateers had been using enlarged versions of the BRM 1.5 V8 of up to 2.1 litres in 1966, as competitive three-litre engines were in short supply in the first year of the new regulations. Lotus also took up the H16 as an interim measure until the Cosworth DFV was ready, building the Lotus 43 to house it, and Jim Clark managed to win the US Grand Prix at Watkins Glen with this combination. It was the only victory for this engine in a world championship race. Lotus built the similar Lotus 42 designed for Indianapolis with a 4.2-litre version of the H16 (2.9375 x 2.36 in, 74.61 x 59.94 mm) but this was never raceworthy; the cars were raced with Ford V8s instead.

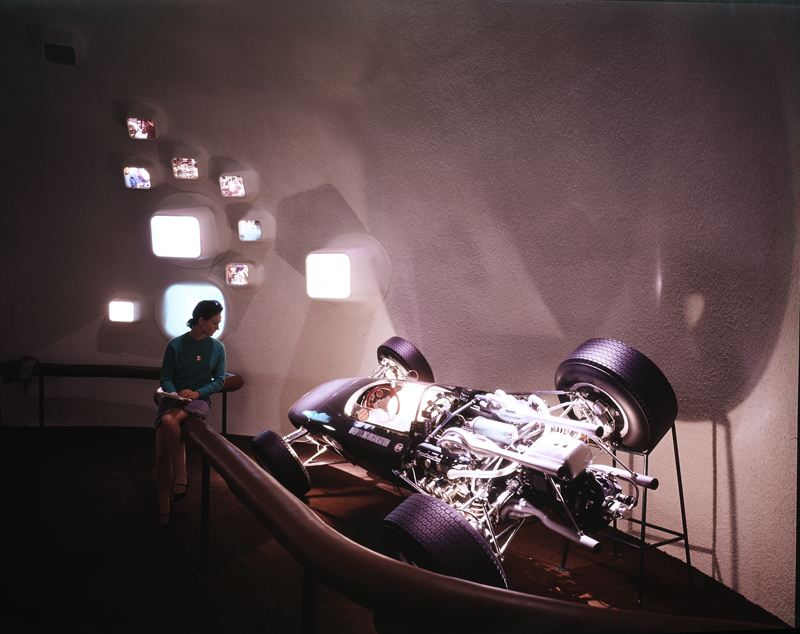
BRM P109 display car with H16 engine at Expo 67

The H16 engine was redesigned with a narrow-angle four-valve head and magnesium main castings to reduce weight and increase power, but was never raced (it was intended for the 1967 BRM P115) as BRM decided to use the V12 unit which was being sold to other F1 and sports car teams with encouraging results.

=== BRM V12 ===
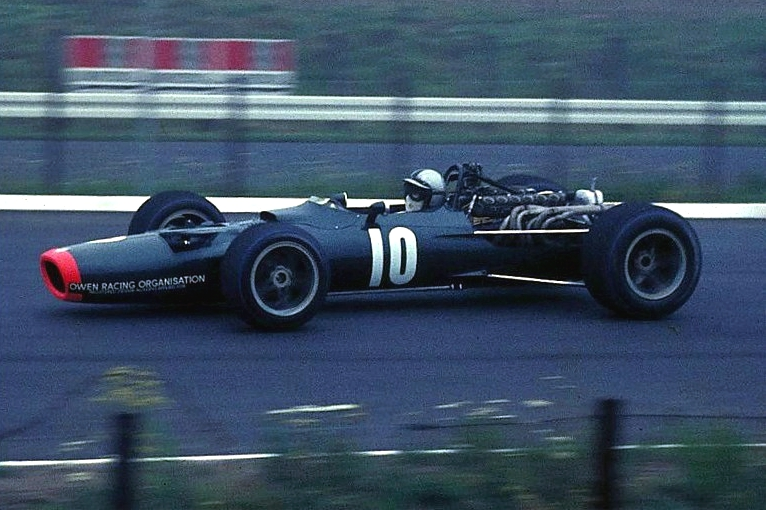
Pedro Rodríguez with BRM 1968

The H16 was replaced by a V12 (2.9375 x 2.25 in, 74.61 x 57.15 mm) designed by Geoff Johnson. It had been intended for sports car use, but was first used in F1 by the McLaren M5A. Back at the works, the early V12 years were lean ones. In 1967 the two-valve layout gave about 360 bhp (270 kW) at 9,000 rpm. In 1968 this had increased to 390 bhp (290 kW) at 9,750 rpm. Geoff Johnson updated the design by adding a four-valve head, based on the H16 485 bhp 4-valve layout; this improved the V12's power output to 452 bhp (337 kW) at 10,500 rpm and eventually to a claimed 465 bhp (347 kW) during 1969. In 1973, Louis Stanley claimed 490 bhp (370 kW) at 11,750 rpm. The design and building of the first V-12 chassis, the P126 was contracted to former Lotus and Eagle designer Len Terry's Transatlantic Automotive Consultants. The cars first appeared during the 1968 Tasman Championship, powered by 2.5 litre versions of the engine, temporary team driver Bruce McLaren winning the fourth round of the series at Teretonga but being generally unimpressed with the car. BRM themselves built further examples of the Terry design, which were designated P133 and 1968 team drivers Mike Spence and Pedro Rodríguez appeared competitive in early season non championship races at Brands Hatch and Silverstone, but then Spence was killed driving the Lotus 56 turbine during qualifying at Indianapolis. Spence's replacement, Richard Attwood, finished a good second to Graham Hill's Lotus at Monaco, but after this results went downhill and the season petered out ignominiously. For 1969 the four valve per cylinder engine was developed and a new slimline car, the P139 was built. John Surtees joined as the team's lead driver backed up by Jack Oliver. Rodríguez was shunted into the semi-works Parnell team. Surtees' time at BRM was not a happy one and, despite the fact that a ground effect "wing car" was designed, this was never constructed and the team's performances were lacklustre. Surtees left after a single season (1969), along with Tony Rudd who went to Lotus (initially on the road-car side), and Geoff Johnson who departed for Austin Morris.

The team regrouped with Tony Southgate as designer and Rodríguez brought back into the fold to partner Oliver, and gained its first V12 victory when Rodríguez won the 1970 Belgian Grand Prix in a P153, with further victories for Jo Siffert and Peter Gethin in 1971 in the P160. The team had reached one of its intermittent peaks of success. Both Siffert and Rodríguez were killed before the 1972 season and the team had to regroup completely again. Their last World Championship victory came when Jean-Pierre Beltoise drove a stunning race to win the rain-affected 1972 Monaco Grand Prix with the P160. He also won the non-championship 1972 World Championship Victory Race later in the year. The 1972 campaign was generally chaotic: having acquired major sponsorship (of Marlboro cigarettes, being the first team in the category to be sponsored by the brand), Louis Stanley originally planned to field up to six cars (three for established drivers, three for paying journeymen and young drivers) of varying designs including P153s, P160s and P180s and actually ran up to five for a mix of paying and paid drivers until it became obvious that it was completely overstretched and the team's sponsors insisted that the team should cut back to a more reasonable level and only three cars were run in 1973 for Beltoise, Lauda, and Regazzoni. At the end of the year, Marlboro would transfer its sponsorship to McLaren from 1974 (staying with the team until 1996).

=== Decline and fall ===
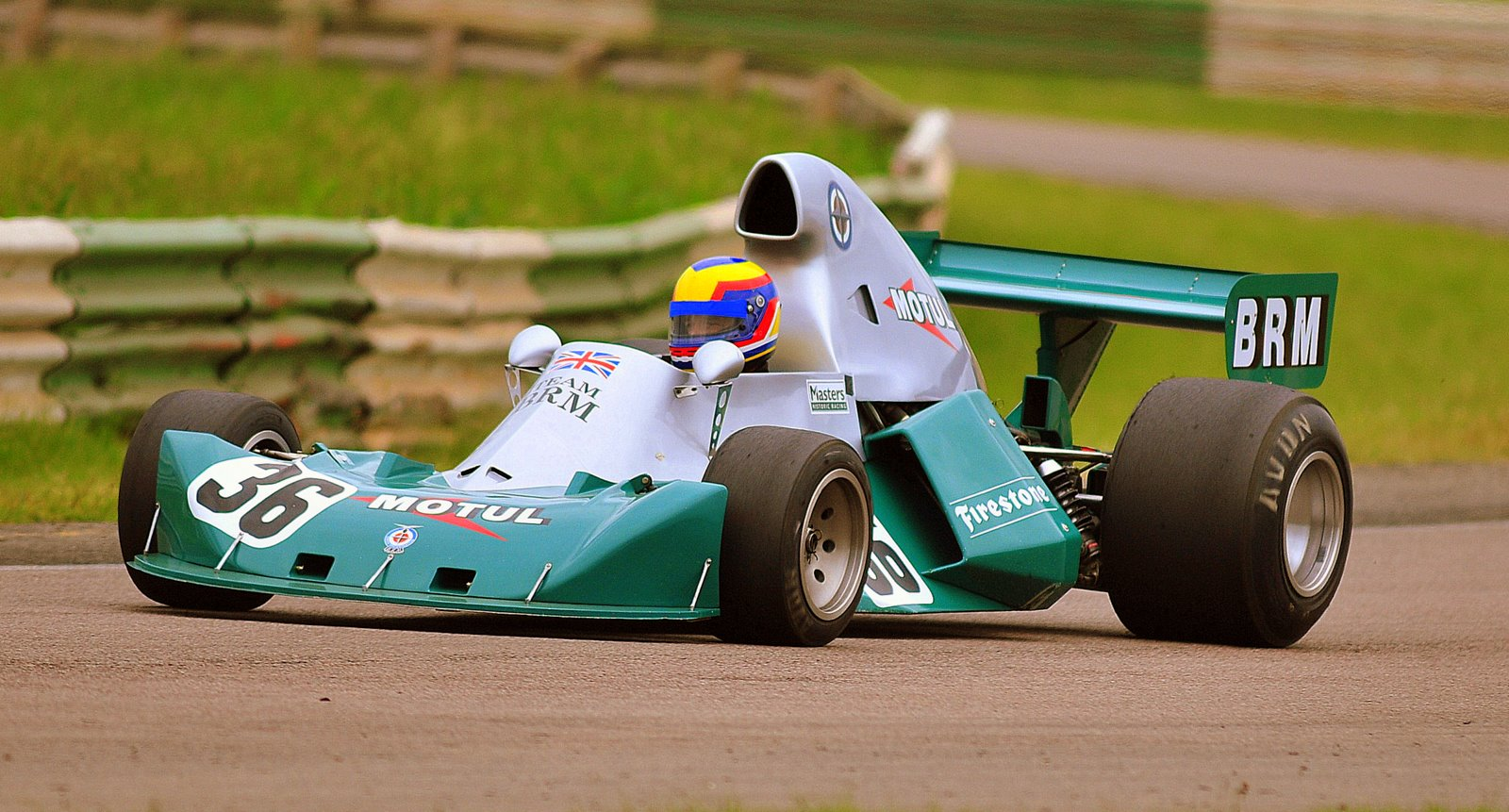
A BRM P201, being demonstrated in 2009.

The last notable performance was Beltoise's second-place finish in the 1974 South African Grand Prix with the Mike Pilbeam-designed P201, a car with a pyramidal monocoque, very different from the curvy "Coke-bottle" Southgate cars. The Owen Organisation ended its support of the team and it was run on a lower-key basis by Louis Stanley and some of the Bourne personnel as Stanley-BRM until 1977. Old P201s were initially used, with the team hoping for a revival with the bulky P207 – which failed entirely.

Cereal millionaire and amateur racer John Jordan purchased some of the team's assets when the team finally folded, and backed the building of a pair of P230 cars by CTG, with the aim of competing in the national-level Aurora AFX Formula One Championship. Teddy Pilette raced a P207 during 1978 with modest success, finishing fourth at Oulton Park and fifth at Brands Hatch. One chassis also apparently raced in the revived Can-Am series.

=== Side projects ===
The team became involved with Rover's gas-turbine project, with the Rover-BRM gas turbine car running at Le Mans in 1963 and 1965; it was damaged in testing and missed the 1964 race. BRM were also involved with Donald Campbell's gas-turbine Bluebird-Proteus CN7 project. In later years they also built an unsuccessful Can-Am car, and dabbled with larger versions of the H16 engine for the Indianapolis 500. As a part of the Owen Organisation, BRM also worked on tuned road-car engines for Ford, Chrysler and others. The BRM-tuned version of the 1557 cc Lotus-Ford Twin Cam engine was particularly popular as the Special Equipment option on the Lotus Elan. This improved version of the Lotus-Ford engine was used by Tony Rudd when he left BRM for Lotus to form the basis of the Lotus produced "Sprint" version of the engine used in the Elan Sprint, Elan Plus2S-130, Europa JPS and Caterham Seven.

BRM were contracted by Chrysler (UK) Competition Department to develop a sixteen-valve cylinder head for the Hillman Avenger engine. It proved unreliable, underpowered, and unable to compete with the Ford rally team's proven Cosworth BDB-powered RS1600 Escorts.

== BRM engine sales ==
The Owen Organisation expected BRM to turn a profit through sales of racing engines; the four-cylinder appeared briefly in a Cooper-BRM special for Stirling Moss but found no other customers. The V8 powered many 1.5-litre cars, including various private Lotuses and Brabhams as well as the BRP works team. Enlarged Tasman Series V8s of between 1.9 and 2.1 L were popular in 1966 as a stopgap before full three-litre engines were widely available. These units were also sold to Matra to power its early sports-prototypes.

A one-litre Formula Two engine was also made available, based on half of the F1 V8. This was not successful, in a formula dominated by Cosworth-Ford and eventually Honda engines.

Team Lotus used the ill-fated H16 engine, scoring its only win.

V12s were sold to other constructors of which the most notable were Cooper, John Wyer and McLaren. Matra entered into a contract with BRM to collaborate in the design of their own V12 engine, but when this became public knowledge the French constructor was forced to drop the involvement with BRM and restart development with a French partner, as its government funding was threatened, but there were still close resemblances between the finished Matra engine and the BRM.

== Sponsorship and colours ==
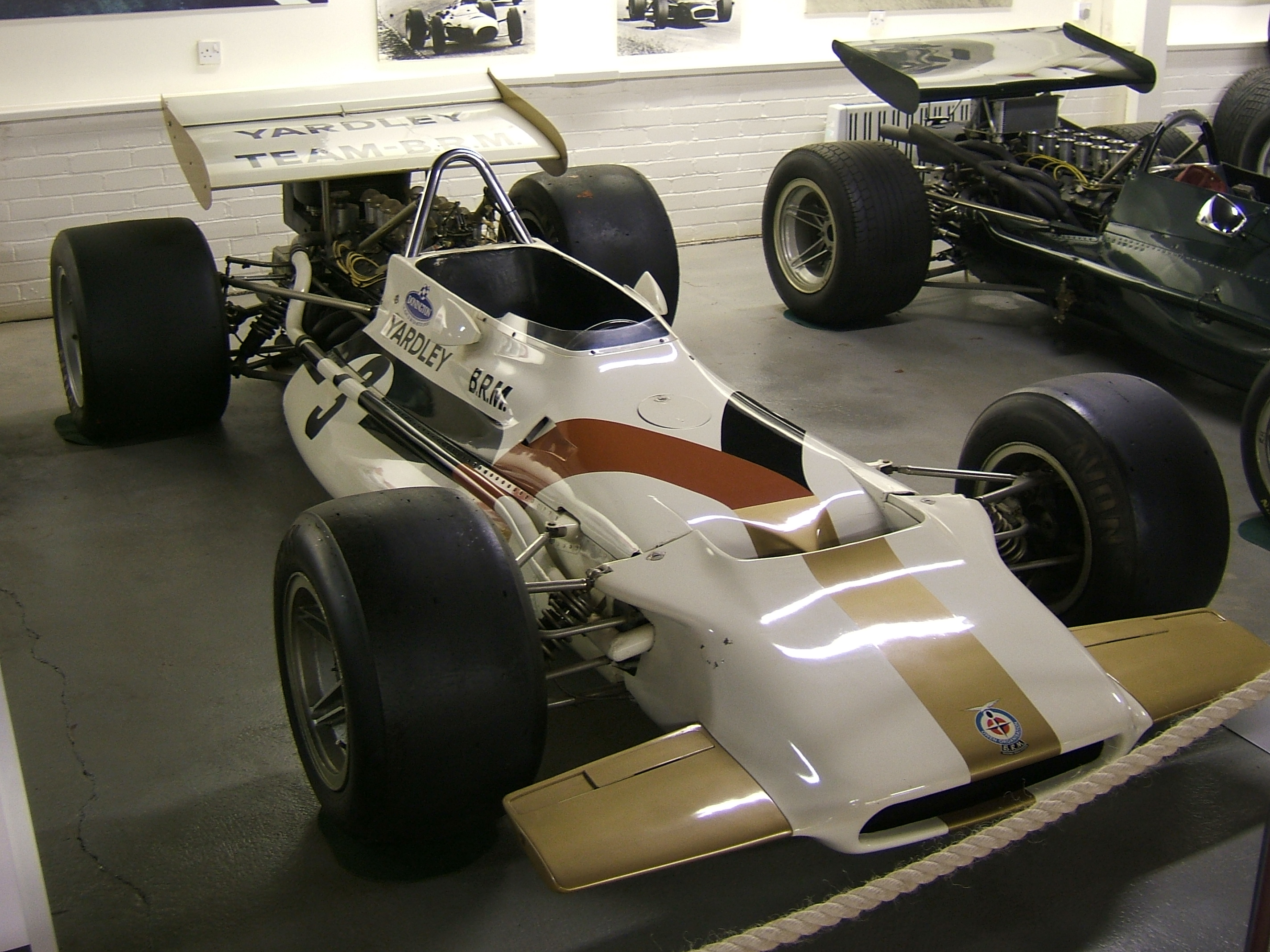
A BRM P153 in the 1970 season Yardley livery.

The first BRM cars entered by the BRM works team were a pale duck-egg green (any shade of green represented the British racing green, the national racing colour of Great Britain), but this was later replaced for aesthetic reasons by a very dark metallic shade of grey-green. During the team's Owen-owned years the cars bore simple "Owen Racing Organisation" signage. The BRP-entered BRM for Moss and Herrmann was a non-metallic duck-egg green. However, BRM cars entered by non-British privateer teams wore their respective national racing colours, e.g. the Italian Scuderia Centro Sud team ran their cars in Italian red and cars entered by Maurice Trintignant's privateer team were in French blue.

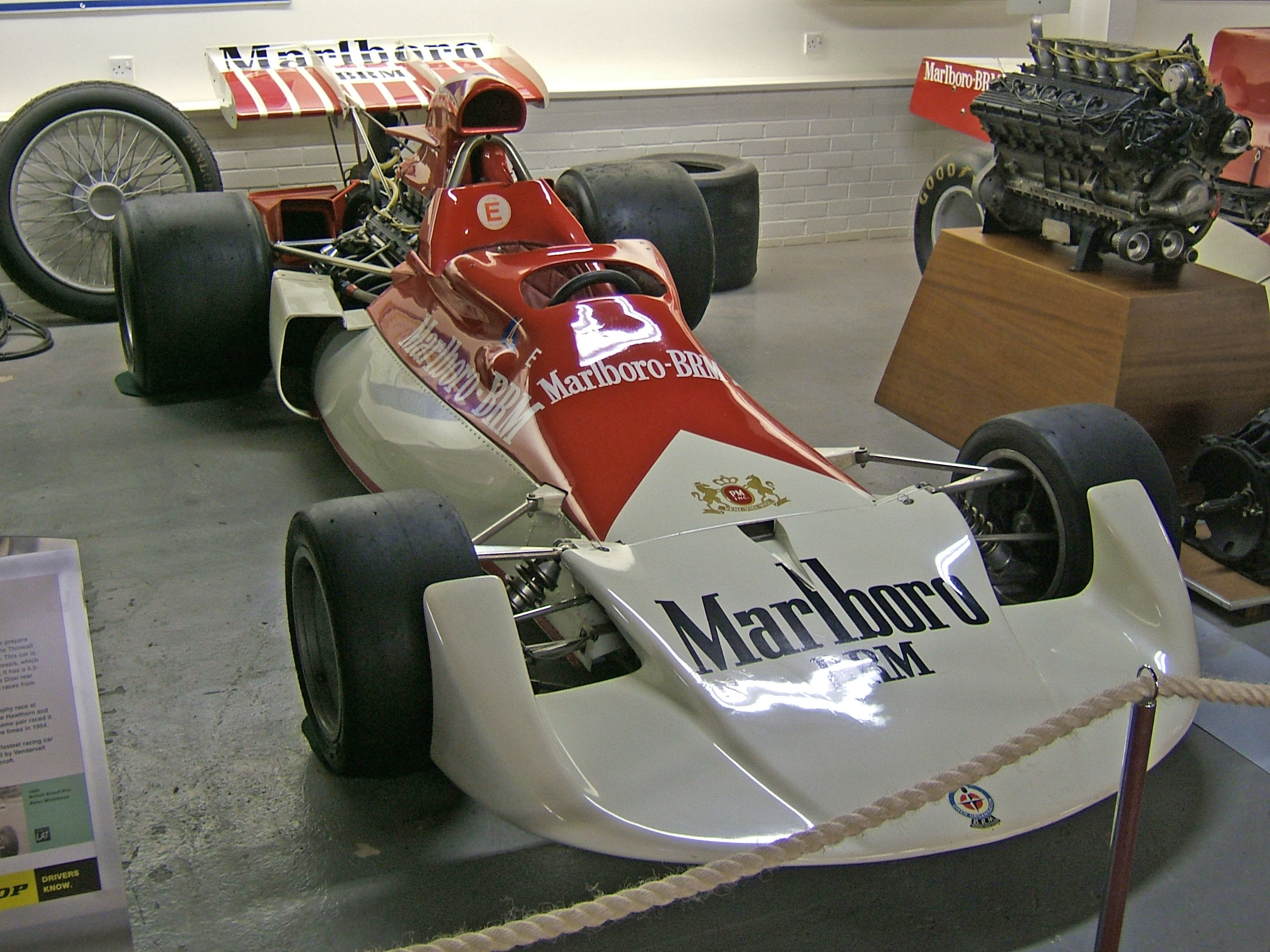
A BRM P180 in the 1972 season Marlboro livery.

At one point in the 1960s Alfred Owen's brother Ernest wanted the team to paint their cars orange with black trim, orange being the Owen Organisation's corporate colour, used for a band around the nose of the cars and for the mechanics' overalls; Rudd (who didn't like the idea of orange BRMs) pointed out that orange was the Dutch racing colour, when such things were still honoured; through most of the 1960s the cars ran with Owen orange bands round the nose.

The team acquired significant commercial sponsorship from Yardley for the 1970 season, running in white with black, gold and ochre stripes in a stylised "Y" wrapping around the car's bodywork, losing this deal to McLaren for the 1972 season and replacing it by Marlboro's familiar white and red (a flat shade, not dayglo) colours. The BRM team became the first F1 team sponsored by Marlboro and at the 1972 Monaco Grand Prix the team achieved their last win which was also the first win for a Marlboro-sponsored F1 car. Ironically this deal was also lost to McLaren for the 1974 season, to be replaced briefly by Motul in a pale green and silver colour scheme. As Stanley-BRM the cars initially ran in red, white and blue with no major sponsorship; for the team's swansong it was sponsored by Rotary Watches and ran in pale blue and white. The Jordan-BRM P230 was black and gold.

=== Later use of BRM name ===
BRM raced again as part of a project by John Mangoletsi for a Group C sports car known as the P351 with the backing of the Owen family to use the BRM name. Unfortunately the car was short lived and unsuccessful. In 1997 Keith Wiggins and Pacific Racing would resurrect the car as the BRM P301, using the BRM name only because it was technically a BRM built chassis but had no other connection to British Racing Motors. Heavily modified into an open cockpit sportscar, the car was equally unsuccessful.

A special edition Rover 200 was produced to commemorate the Rover-BRM gas-turbine car; this was finished in Brooklands Green (however not the very dark metallic gunmetal BRM shade) with an orange lower, front grille and silver details.

In October 2008, a press release announced that Bee Automobiles Ltd car BRM Bee Four ERV would compete in the British Speed Hill Climb championships:

"The 'BRM Bee Four ERV', code named the 'Watt 4', is an all-electric AWD (all-wheel-drive) vehicle capable of producing 700 hp or 520 kW. The ERV uses motor technology developed at Oxford University. The car is theoretically capable of reaching speeds of up to 250 mph. Participants in the project include Rubery Owen, Oxford University, Oxford Brookes and MIRA Ltd – Motor Industry Research Association. Paul Owen, Grandson of Sir Alfred and Managing Director of Rubery Owen's Environmental Technology Subsidiary Rozone Limited, commented: "Rubery Owen is very pleased to see the BRM name once again being used to drive forward an innovative development to take motorsport to new levels'"

As of 2011, the car had yet to leave the drawing board.

In 2012, Bobbie Neate, granddaughter of Alfred Ernest Owen (who created Rubery Owen) and daughter of Jean Stanley (née Owen) wrote of her memories of BRM racing in the 1950s and 60s in her book Conspiracy of Secrets.

== Formula One World Championship results ==
=== Grand Prix winners ===
The BRM team won seventeen Formula One Grands Prix as follows:

Date	Race	Venue	Driver	Chassis	Engine
31 May 1959	(Netherlands) Dutch Grand Prix	Zandvoort	(Sweden) Jo Bonnier	P25	2.5L I4
20 May 1962	(Netherlands) Dutch Grand Prix	Zandvoort	(United Kingdom) Graham Hill	P57	1.5L V8
5 August 1962	(Germany) German Grand Prix	Nürburgring	(United Kingdom) Graham Hill	P57	1.5L V8
16 September 1962	(Italy) Italian Grand Prix	Monza	(United Kingdom) Graham Hill	P57	1.5L V8
29 December 1962	(South Africa) South African Grand Prix	Prince George	(United Kingdom) Graham Hill	P57	1.5L V8
26 May 1963	Monaco Grand Prix	Monaco	(United Kingdom) Graham Hill	P57	1.5L V8
6 October 1963	United States Grand Prix	Watkins Glen	(United Kingdom) Graham Hill	P57	1.5L V8
10 May 1964	Monaco Grand Prix	Monaco	(United Kingdom) Graham Hill	P261	1.5L V8
4 October 1964	United States Grand Prix	Watkins Glen	(United Kingdom) Graham Hill	P261	1.5L V8
30 May 1965	Monaco Grand Prix	Monaco	(United Kingdom) Graham Hill	P261	1.5L V8
12 September 1965	(Italy) Italian Grand Prix	Monza	(United Kingdom) Jackie Stewart	P261	1.5L V8
3 October 1965	United States Grand Prix	Watkins Glen	(United Kingdom) Graham Hill	P261	1.5L V8
22 May 1966	Monaco Grand Prix	Monaco	(United Kingdom) Jackie Stewart	P261	1.9L V8
7 June 1970	(Belgium) Belgian Grand Prix	Spa	(Mexico) Pedro Rodríguez	P153	3.0L V12
15 August 1971	(Austria) Austrian Grand Prix	Österreichring	(Switzerland) Jo Siffert	P160	3.0L V12
5 September 1971	(Italy) Italian Grand Prix	Monza	(United Kingdom) Peter Gethin	P160	3.0L V12
14 May 1972	Monaco Grand Prix	Monaco	(France) Jean-Pierre Beltoise	P160B	3.0L V12

== Exhibition ==
There is a small exhibition about Raymond Mays, including his interest in BRM, together with the trophies won by BRM while it was owned by the Owen Organisation, at Bourne Civic Society's Heritage Centre.

== Computer simulation ==
A driveable, detailed virtual recreation of the BRM H16-powered P83/P115 and the BRM P261 was made available in the PC simulation Grand Prix Legends that is based on the 1967 Formula One season. An unlicensed recreation of the 1968 BRM P126 can be found in rFactor 2.

== Reawakening ==
In celebration of BRM's 70th anniversary, John Owen, the 81-year-old son of BRM's original owner, the renowned industrialist, Sir Alfred Owen, has commissioned the build of three authentic 'new' 1950s V16 race cars. BRM's technical partners, Hall and Hall, used the original 'engine number two' a V16 power unit dating back to the 1950s, to help engineers overcome the technical challenges presented by one of the most complex Formula 1 engines of its day – each with more than 36,000 precision-engineered parts.

The re-built engine itself was cautiously tested at Hall and Hall's dynamometer at RAF Folkingham, Lincolnshire, where the original BRM Formula 1 engineering team worked during the 1950s. This particular engine has not been run since one of the original BRM team drivers, José Froilán González, then 77 years old, accidentally over-revved it at BRM's 50th anniversary celebration at Silverstone in 1999. It was comprehensively 'lunched', according to Hall and Hall technicians and has remained in storage ever since.

The three 'new' P15 V16 BRMs have been made possible by the discovery of three unused chassis numbers which were originally allocated to the racing programme, but never built due to a change in the Formula 1 technical regulations at the time.

The first car commissioned by John Owen is expected to be delivered and presented in public in 2021.

Sporting positions
Preceded by Ferrari	Formula One Constructors' Champion; 1962	Succeeded by Lotus
