= 1967 Monaco Grand Prix =

Coordinates: 43°44′4.74″N 7°25′16.8″E

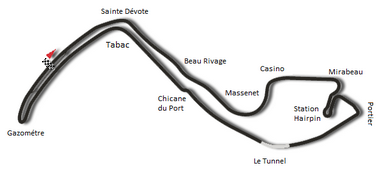

Race details
- Date: May 7, 1967
- Official name: XXV Grand Prix Automobile de Monaco
- Location: Circuit de Monaco, Monte Carlo, Monaco
- Course: Street Circuit
- Course length: 3.145 km (1.954 miles)
- Distance: 100 laps, 314.500 km (195.400 miles)

Pole position
Driver	(Australia) Jack Brabham	Brabham-Repco
- Time: 1:27.6

Fastest lap
Driver	(United Kingdom) Jim Clark	Lotus-Climax
- Time: 1:29.5

Podium
First	(New Zealand) Denny Hulme	Brabham-Repco
Second	(United Kingdom) Graham Hill	Lotus-BRM
Third	(New Zealand) Chris Amon	Ferrari

The 1967 Monaco Grand Prix was a Formula One motor race held at Monaco on May 7, 1967. It was race 2 of 11 in both the 1967 World Championship of Drivers and the 1967 International Cup for Formula One Manufacturers, albeit four months after Pedro Rodríguez's unexpected victory at Kyalami. The 100-lap race was won by Brabham driver Denny Hulme after he started from fourth position. Graham Hill finished second for the Lotus team and Ferrari driver Chris Amon came in third.

The race was overshadowed by the fatal accident suffered by Ferrari driver Lorenzo Bandini in the late stages of the race.

Between these races, the usual pre-season races had produced some unusual results, with Dan Gurney winning at Brands Hatch, in the Race of Champions in his Eagle-Weslake, and Mike Parkes taking the BRDC International Trophy for Ferrari.

The straight after the Gasworks hairpin was lengthened by moving the 'Start and Finish' closer to Ste-Devote.

== Report ==
=== Entry ===
A total of 17 Formula One cars were entered for the event. The field was bolstered by a pair of Formula Two Matras. The Monaco circuit with its tight layout, gave the 3-litre cars no advantage, thus many top teams entered their drivers in 2 or 2.5-litre cars. In fact the Formula Two Matras were powered by 1.6-litre Cosworth engines. Honda was back with John Surtees, with a V12 engine and the Anglo American Racers were at Monaco for the first time, with their Eagle-Weslake.

=== Qualifying ===
Jack Brabham took pole position for Brabham Racing Organisation, in their Brabham-Repco BT19, averaging a speed of 80.779 mph, around the 1.954 miles (3.145 km) course. Brabham was joined on the front row by Ferrari's Lorenzo Bandini. The next row featured Surtees in the Honda and Denny Hulme in the second Brabham. The third row was an all Scottish affair, with Jim Clark (Lotus-Climax) ahead of Jackie Stewart's BRM.

=== Race start through lap 81 ===
The opening few laps were eventful – Bandini going into the lead. Brabham's Repco engine blew up almost immediately, at Spélugues curve, and he spun in front of Bruce McLaren and Jo Siffert who collided taking avoiding action. Only Siffert damaged his car and had to pit for repairs. Brabham continued, but was losing oil from Mirabeau to the port, whilst Clark had to take to the escape road after slipping on Brabham's oil. (Brabham retired at Mirabeau with a blown engine as a result.)

On lap two Clark went off and dropped to the rear of the field, while Hulme and Stewart managed to pass Bandini into the lead after he too slipped on Brabham's oil. Hulme stayed in front until the sixth lap when Stewart swept past, until his crownwheel and pinion broke on lap 14. Hulme re-took the lead. The race settled down with Bandini second, McLaren third, after the departure of Surtees, with an engine failure. Clark's heroic battle from 14th up to fourth ended with broken shock absorber on lap 43. This promoted Chris Amon to fourth.

In the second half of the race, Bandini began to close in on Hulme. McLaren was holding Amon at bay until he was forced into the pits to change a battery. This dropped him behind Amon and Graham Hill. Piers Courage in the BRM had spun out on the hill just out of Sainte Devote by lap 65 and retired immediately after pulling off the track.

=== Lap 82 accident and finish ===
On lap 82 disaster struck. Bandini's chase ended in horror when he clipped the chicane and hit a hidden mooring head, with the car turning over and exploding into flames amongst the straw bales. Bandini was trapped in his car while it burned. The rescue operation was hopelessly inadequate, the intervention was very slow and precious minutes passed before the fire was extinguished and Bandini was rescued and rushed to hospital. The rescue was not helped by a helicopter carrying a television camera crew, as it hovered at low level, the downdraught from the rotor blades fanned what remained of the fire, which reignited with a new ferocity.

Meanwhile, Hulme continued to lead the race to the finish unchallenged. With just eight laps to go, Amon suffered a puncture and dropped to third, with second going to Hill. Three of the top four finishers (Hulme, Amon and McLaren) were New Zealand drivers - 30% of the total number of New Zealand drivers (10) who have started a Formula 1 World Championship Grand Prix.

=== Post-race ===
Bandini suffered horrendous burns and died of these injuries three days later - the tragedy overshadowing Hulme's first victory on one of the world's most difficult circuits. When the news broke, many of the star drivers were travelling to the United States to qualify for the Indianapolis 500. This was the last Monaco Grand Prix that was to run for 100 laps.

Following the sad events of this race, straw bales were banned from Grand Prix circuits. The development of fire-retardant fuel systems and flameproof clothing for drivers and marshals was accelerated, and never again would a TV camera crew be allowed to fly a helicopter low over a burning car.

== Classification ==
=== Qualifying ===
Pos	No	Driver	Constructor	Time	Gap
1	8	(Australia) Jack Brabham	Brabham-Repco	1:27.6	—
2	18	(Italy) Lorenzo Bandini	Ferrari	1:28.3	+0.7
3	7	(United Kingdom) John Surtees	Honda	1:28.4	+0.8
4	9	(New Zealand) Denny Hulme	Brabham-Repco	1:28.8	+1.2
5	12	(United Kingdom) Jim Clark	Lotus-Climax	1:28.8	+1.2
6	4	(United Kingdom) Jackie Stewart	BRM	1:29.0	+1.4
7	23	(United States) Dan Gurney	Eagle-Weslake	1:29.3	+1.7
8	14	(United Kingdom) Graham Hill	Lotus-BRM	1:29.9	+2.3
9	17	(Switzerland) Jo Siffert	Cooper-Maserati	1:30.0	+2.4
10	16	(New Zealand) Bruce McLaren	McLaren-BRM	1:30.0	+2.4
11	2	(France) Johnny Servoz-Gavin	Matra-Ford	1:30.4	+2.8
12	5	(United Kingdom) Mike Spence	BRM	1:30.6	+3.0
13	6	(United Kingdom) Piers Courage	BRM	1:30.6	+3.0
14	20	(New Zealand) Chris Amon	Ferrari	1:30.7	+3.1
15	10	(Austria) Jochen Rindt	Cooper-Maserati	1:30.8	+3.2
16	11	(Mexico) Pedro Rodríguez	Cooper-Maserati	1:32.4	+4.8
DNQ	15	(United Kingdom) Bob Anderson	Brabham-Climax	1:30.6	+3.0
DNQ	1	(France) Jean-Pierre Beltoise	Matra-Ford	1:31.0	+3.4
DNQ	22	(United States) Richie Ginther	Eagle-Weslake	1:31.1	+3.5

=== Race ===
Pos	No	Driver	Constructor	Laps	Time/Retired	Grid	Points
1	9	(New Zealand) Denny Hulme	Brabham-Repco	100	2:34:34.3	4	9
2	14	(United Kingdom) Graham Hill	Lotus-BRM	99	+ 1 Lap	8	6
3	20	(New Zealand) Chris Amon	Ferrari	98	+ 2 Laps	14	4
4	16	(New Zealand) Bruce McLaren	McLaren-BRM	97	+ 3 Laps	10	3
5	11	(Mexico) Pedro Rodríguez	Cooper-Maserati	96	+ 4 Laps	16	2
6	5	(United Kingdom) Mike Spence	BRM	96	+ 4 Laps	12	1
Ret	18	(Italy) Lorenzo Bandini	Ferrari	81	Fatal Accident	2	
Ret	6	(United Kingdom) Piers Courage	BRM	64	Spun Off	13	
Ret	12	(United Kingdom) Jim Clark	Lotus-Climax	42	Suspension	5	
Ret	7	(United Kingdom) John Surtees	Honda	32	Engine	3	
Ret	17	(Switzerland) Jo Siffert	Cooper-Maserati	31	Oil Pressure	9	
Ret	4	(United Kingdom) Jackie Stewart	BRM	14	Differential	6	
Ret	10	(Austria) Jochen Rindt	Cooper-Maserati	14	Gearbox	15	
Ret	23	(United States) Dan Gurney	Eagle-Weslake	4	Fuel Pump	7	
Ret	2	(France) Johnny Servoz-Gavin	Matra-Ford	4	Injection	11	
Ret	8	(Australia) Jack Brabham	Brabham-Repco	0	Engine	1	
DNQ	15	(United Kingdom) Bob Anderson	Brabham-Climax				
DNQ	1	(France) Jean-Pierre Beltoise	Matra-Ford				
DNQ	22	(United States) Richie Ginther	Eagle-Weslake				

== Notes ==
- This was the Formula One World Championship debut for French driver Johnny Servoz-Gavin.
- This race marked the 5th win and 10th podium finish for a Repco-powered car.

== Championship standings after the race ==
Drivers' Championship standings

	Pos	Driver	Points
3	1	(New Zealand) Denny Hulme	12
1	2	(Mexico) Pedro Rodríguez	11
6	3	(United Kingdom) Graham Hill	6
2	4	(Rhodesia) John Love	6
2	5	(United Kingdom) John Surtees	4

Constructors' Championship standings

	Pos	Constructor	Points
3	1	(United Kingdom) Brabham-Repco	12
1	2	(United Kingdom) Cooper-Maserati	11
3	3	(United Kingdom) Lotus-BRM	6
2	4	(United Kingdom) Cooper-Climax	6
2	5	(Japan) Honda	4

- Notes: Only the top five positions are included for both sets of standings.

Previous race: 1967 South African Grand Prix	FIA Formula One World Championship; 1967 season	Next race: 1967 Dutch Grand Prix
Previous race: 1966 Monaco Grand Prix	Monaco Grand Prix	Next race: 1968 Monaco Grand Prix
