= Prodrive (disambiguation) =

Prodrive may refer to:

- Prodrive, a motorsport and automotive engineering group based in Banbury, Oxfordshire, England
  - Prodrive F1, a proposed Formula One team run by Prodrive Ltd
  - Prodrive P2, a prototype two-seater sports car designed, engineered and built by Prodrive Ltd
- Tickford Racing, an Australian Supercar team formerly known as Prodrive Racing Australia
