= Formula One engines =

This article gives an outline of Formula One engines, also called Formula One power units since the hybrid era starting in 2014. Since its inception in 1947, Formula One has used a variety of engine regulations. Formulae limiting engine capacity had been used in Grand Prix racing on a regular basis since after World War I. The engine formulae are divided according to era.

== Characteristics ==
Formula One currently uses 1.6 litre four-stroke turbocharged 90 degree V6 double-overhead camshaft (DOHC) reciprocating engines. They were introduced in 2014 and have been developed over the subsequent seasons. Mostly from the 2023 season, specifications on Formula One engines, including the software used to control them and the maximum per-engine price to F1 teams of €15,000,000, were frozen until the end of 2025, when the completely new 2026 spec came into effect.

=== High revolutions ===
The history of F1 engines has always been a quest for more power, and the enormous power a Formula One engine produces is generated by operating at a very high rotational speed, reaching over 20,000 revolutions per minute (rpm) during the 2004–2005 seasons. This is because an engine, theoretically, produces double the power when operated twice as fast if combustion (thermal) efficiency and energy loss remain the same. High-revving engines won races no matter how much fuel they consumed and how much wasted heat they generated, as long as they produced more power than the competition. However, with the increasing cost of the exotic materials and production methods that enabled the high-speed operation and the realisation that such advancements in technology were unlikely to ever apply to production vehicles (because the resultant product is very inefficient), it was decided to limit the maximum rotational speed (rpm) to 19,000 in 2007. The maximum rpm was further limited to 18,000 in 2009 and to 15,000 for the 2014–2021 seasons.

Still, the high speed operation of F1 engines contrasts with road car engines of a similar size, which typically operate at less than 6,000 rpm.

=== Long conrods ===
The high-speed rotation created a vibration problem caused by secondary imbalance inherent in piston engines. Tony Rudd found in BRM 1.5L P56 V8 engine (11,000 rpm redline) of 1961–1962 that a long conrod, much longer than required, was key to reducing the secondary vibration, enabling a high revolution. Coventry Climax FWMV Mk.III, using a much longer conrod in the same cylinder block as Mk.II, proved this concept in 1963.

The ratio of stroke to center-to-center conrod length determines the level of secondary imbalance/vibration, which occurs because the average piston speed is higher in the upper half of crank rotation than in the lower half (with engine/cylinder positioned upright) because the piston position at 90° BTDC/ATDC is lower than the stroke mid-point due to conrod tilt angle.

Other teams gradually found the secret of the long conrod, but this concept was not used in mass-produced cars for a long time because it was deemed very inefficient in terms of weight and space utilisation for the lower rev range of production engines. High-revving motorcycle engines, and high-end sports car makers used the concept beginning in the 1980s. The 2.0 litre Volvo B5204 five-cylinder was one of the exceptions, where a long conrod was needed to accommodate its 'Modular' production concept, sharing the same cylinder block with the 2.3L B5234. In October 2005, Daihatsu used a long conrod to the extremely long-stroke 1.5L 3SZ-VE engine introduced with desaxe crankshaft, 4-valves, and variable valve timing.

=== Valve springs ===
Until the mid-1980s Formula One engines were limited to around 12,000 rpm due to the traditional metal springs used to close the valves. The speed required to close the valves at a higher rpm called for ever stiffer springs, which increased the power required to drive the camshaft to open the valves, to the point where the loss nearly offset the power gain through the increase in rpm. They were replaced by pneumatic valve springs introduced by Renault in 1986, which inherently have a rising rate (progressive rate) that allowed them to have an extremely high spring rate at larger valve strokes without much increasing the driving power requirements at smaller strokes, thus lowering the overall power loss. Since the 1990s, all Formula One engine manufacturers have used pneumatic valve springs with pressurised air.

=== Piston speed ===
In addition to the use of pneumatic valve springs, a Formula One engine's high rpm output has been made possible due to advances in metallurgy and design, allowing lighter pistons and connecting rods to withstand the accelerations necessary to attain such high speeds. Improved design also allows narrower connecting rod ends and so narrower main bearings. This permits higher rpm with less bearing-damaging heat build-up. For each stroke, the piston goes from a virtual stop to almost twice the mean speed (approximately 40 m/s), then back to zero. This occurs once for each of the four strokes in the cycle: one Intake (down), one Compression (up), one Power (ignition-down), one Exhaust (up). Maximum piston acceleration occurs at top dead center (TDC) and is in the region of 95,000 m/s^{2}, about 9,700 times standard gravity (9,700 G).

To lower the maximum piston/conrod acceleration, Formula One cars use short-stroke, multi-cylinder engines that result in lower average piston speed for a given displacement. The number of cylinders peaked at sixteen with the British Racing Motors V16, Coventry Climax FWMW, and BRM P75. It was limited to twelve in 1972, ten in 2000, eight in 2006 and six in 2014. These regulation changes made higher-speed designs more difficult and less efficient. To operate at high engine speeds under such limits, the stroke must be short to prevent catastrophic failure, usually from the connecting rod, which is under very large stresses. Having a short stroke means a relatively large bore is required to reach a given displacement. This results in less efficient combustion, due mostly to flame-front propagation having to travel the long distance (for a volume) of ever thinner disk (larger diameter with less height) -shaped combustion chamber deviating far away from the ideal sphere shape with the tip of spark plug at its center.

=== Efficiency ===
Due to the higher speed operation and the tighter restriction on the number of cylinders, efficiency of a naturally aspirated Formula One engine did not improve much since the 1967 Ford Cosworth DFV and the mean effective pressure stayed at around 14 bar (1.4 MPa) for a long time.

From the 2014 season, a new concept of limiting the maximum fuel flow rate was introduced, which limits the power if energy loss and air/fuel ratio are constant. While the bore and stroke figures are now fixed by the rules, this regulation promoted the competition to improve powertrain efficiency. Since fuel rate is limited, the rev limit became meaningless, so it was lifted in 2022. During the 2014–2025 turbo-hybrid era, F1 engines typically revved to about 13,000 rpm, while combustion efficiency rose to about 40 bar BMEP and beyond, using lean and rapid burn techniques enabling λ>1 (average air/fuel ratio much leaner than 14.7:1 by mass) and very high mechanical and effective compression ratios. Compression ratio is a primary determinant of internal-combustion engine efficiency. Current regulation limits mechanical compression ratio to 18:1, but effective compression ratio after turbocharging is not limited. Honda stated the 18:1 ratio was a target far beyond the imagination in 2014, but is "now starting to feel like a real limitation" in 2023. Intake runner-length tuning contributes to raising the effective compression ratio on production vehicles, but Honda says their F1 engines are using the same resonance effect instead to lower the peaks in intake manifold pressure, leaving the work to raise the pressure to the turbocharger. They say this improves anti-knocking properties, enabling a higher boost.

In addition, energy recovery systems from exhaust pressure (MGU-Heat) and engine-brake (MGU-Kinetic) are allowed to further improve efficiency. MGU-H is an electric motor/generator on the common shaft between the exhaust turbine and intake compressor of the turbocharger, while MGU-K is also an electric motor/generator driven by (or driving) crankshaft at a fixed ratio.

Together with improvements in fuel and these energy recovery systems, F1 engines increased power using the same amount of fuel in recent years. For example, Honda RA621H engine of 2021 season generated over 100 kW (130 bhp) more maximum power over RA615H of the 2015 season at the same 100 kg/h fuel flow rate.

With the hugely improved efficiency of the combustion, mechanicals, software and turbocharger, F1 engines are generating much less heat and noise compared to the levels in 2014. Stefano Domenicali said the 2026 regulation will impose intentionally louder exhaust sound to please the fans.

== History ==
Formula One engines have come through various regulations, manufacturers, and configurations. Throughout its history, Formula One has been the forefront for technological innovation in engine design. From the early naturally aspirated engines to the introduction of turbocharged units and hybrid powertrains, each era has pushed the boundaries of engineering. The shift towards hybrids and sustainable technologies reflects the sport's commitment to environmental responsibility and technological advancement. It is imperative to understand the distinction among the terms "Grand Prix", "World Championship" and "Formula One" to come to grips with the history.

Car racing in various forms began almost immediately after the invention of the automobile, and many of the first organised car racing events were held in Europe before 1900. In the case of the Pau – Tarbes – Bayonne – Pau (300km) road race held in 1900, there were no class divisions, and no prize on record was given to the winner, René de Knyff driving a Panhard et Levassor (2.1-litre, four-cylinder engine called the 'Phoenix' jointly developed with Gottlieb Daimler in Germany, about 20 hp), who became the commissioner of the CSI later. In 1901, the event was named "Semaine de Pau (Week in Pau)" held at Circuit de Pau-Ville (2.65km), and the prizes awarded to the winners were "Grand Prix de Pau (Grand Prize of Pau)" for the "650 kg or heavier" class, "Grand Prix du Palais d'Hiver (Grand Prize of the Winter Palace)" for "400 – 650 kg" class, and "Second Grand Prix du Palais d'Hiver" for the "under 400 kg" class. This event is significant not only because it called the prizes Grand Prix, but also because it was one of the very first automobile race events, including the fastest class of cars, held on a closed circuit.

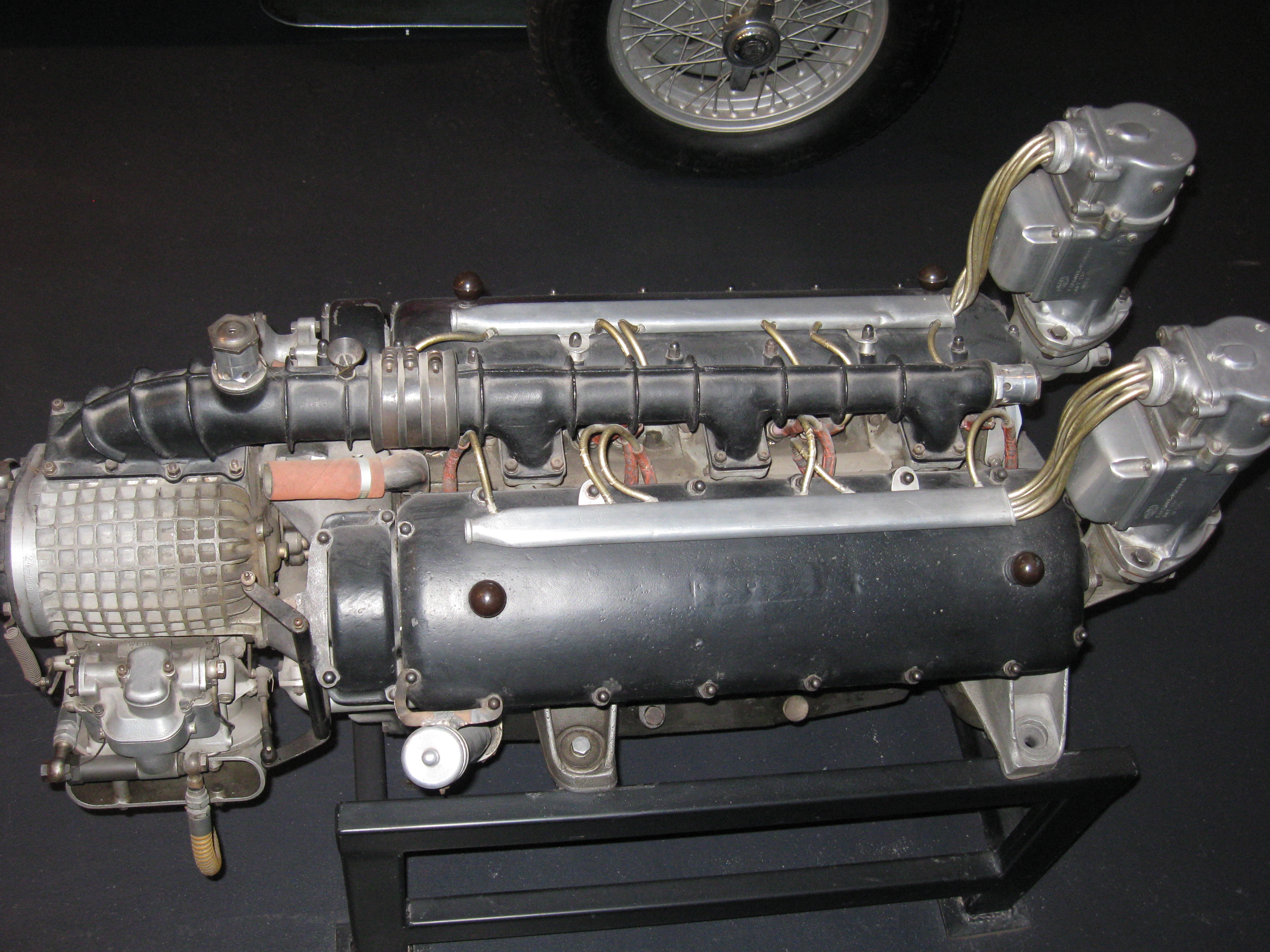
A 1.5-litre V12 supercharged engine from the Ferrari 125 of 1950

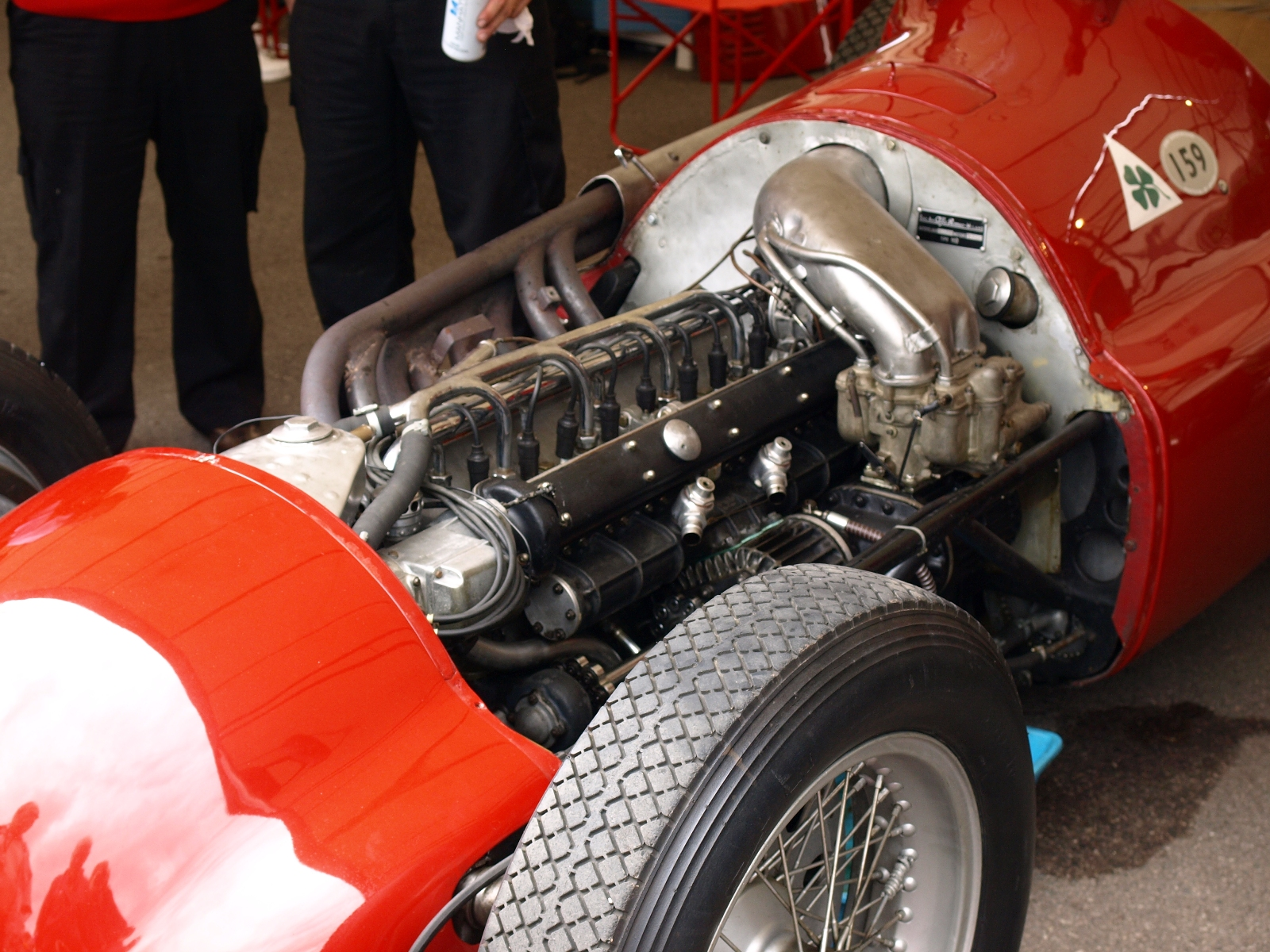
This Alfa Romeo 159 1.5L supercharged straight-8 engine of 1951 could produce up to 425 PS (313 kW).

It became obvious that the size of the engines (and whether they were supercharged) primarily determined how fast they could run, rather than the size and weight of the cars. After a period with series of fatal accidents and regulation changes, "under 1,500 cc with supercharger, or 4,500 cc without" was applied to the Grand Prix races for Voiture class in France, starting with the 1914 French Grand Prix. The Voiturette class was re-defined as "under 1,100 cc, no supercharger".

After World War I (1914–1918), countries outside of France started using the "Grand Prix" name for races with different regulations, and in 1922, Commission Sportive Internationale (CSI), an international race governing committee was established by Automobile Club of France on behalf of AIACR. This AIACR sanctioned the Automobile World Championship from 1925 to 1930, European Drivers' Championship from 1931 to 1939, and later became the Fédération Internationale de l'Automobile (FIA) in 1946.

Formula One was defined by the CSI as the first internationally unified regulation to govern a class of racing cars in 1946 to be effective 1947, reflecting the Voiture regulation of "under 1,500 cc with supercharger, or 4,500 cc without". After Formula One was more or less 'ratified' or accepted by other countries, Formula Two was defined in 1947 as "under 500 cc with supercharger, or 2,000 cc without".

In contrast to the pre-existed European Drivers' Championship, Formula One events were meant to be competition among the countries. Each car, or team, represented a country in this 'international' race, with the cars painted in the "national colours", like red for Italy, green for the UK, silver for Germany, and blue for France. The World Championship for Drivers was defined by the CSI in 1949 for 1950 and onwards to honour the drivers, instead of the countries they represented. The World Championship for Constructors started in 1958, created partly to resolve the then-common dispute between a winning driver and his team on the ownership of the Grand Prix trophy. These championships had a longer-term effect of downplaying the country representation.

Over the years, Formula One added more and more regulations, not only on engines but chassis, tyres, fuel, inspections, championship points, penalties, safety measures, cost control, licensing, distribution of profits, how the qualifying and races must be governed and run, etc., etc. Today, the regulations on Power Unit are a small part of what defines Formula One, which regulates even the number of Summer vacation days the constructor factories must observe.

=== 1947–1953 ===
This era combined pre-war 1.5L supercharged voiturette engine regulations, with 4.5 L atmospheric Grand Prix engines. The Indianapolis 500 (which was a round of the World Drivers' Championship from 1950 onwards) still used pre-war Grand Prix regulations, with 4.5 L atmospheric and 3.0 L supercharged engines. The power range was up to 425 hp (317 kW), though the BRM Type 15 of 1953 reportedly achieved 600 hp (447 kW) with a 1.5 L supercharged engine.

In 1952 and 1953, the World Drivers' Championship was run to Formula Two regulations, but the existing Formula One regulations remained in force and a number of Formula One races were still held in those years.

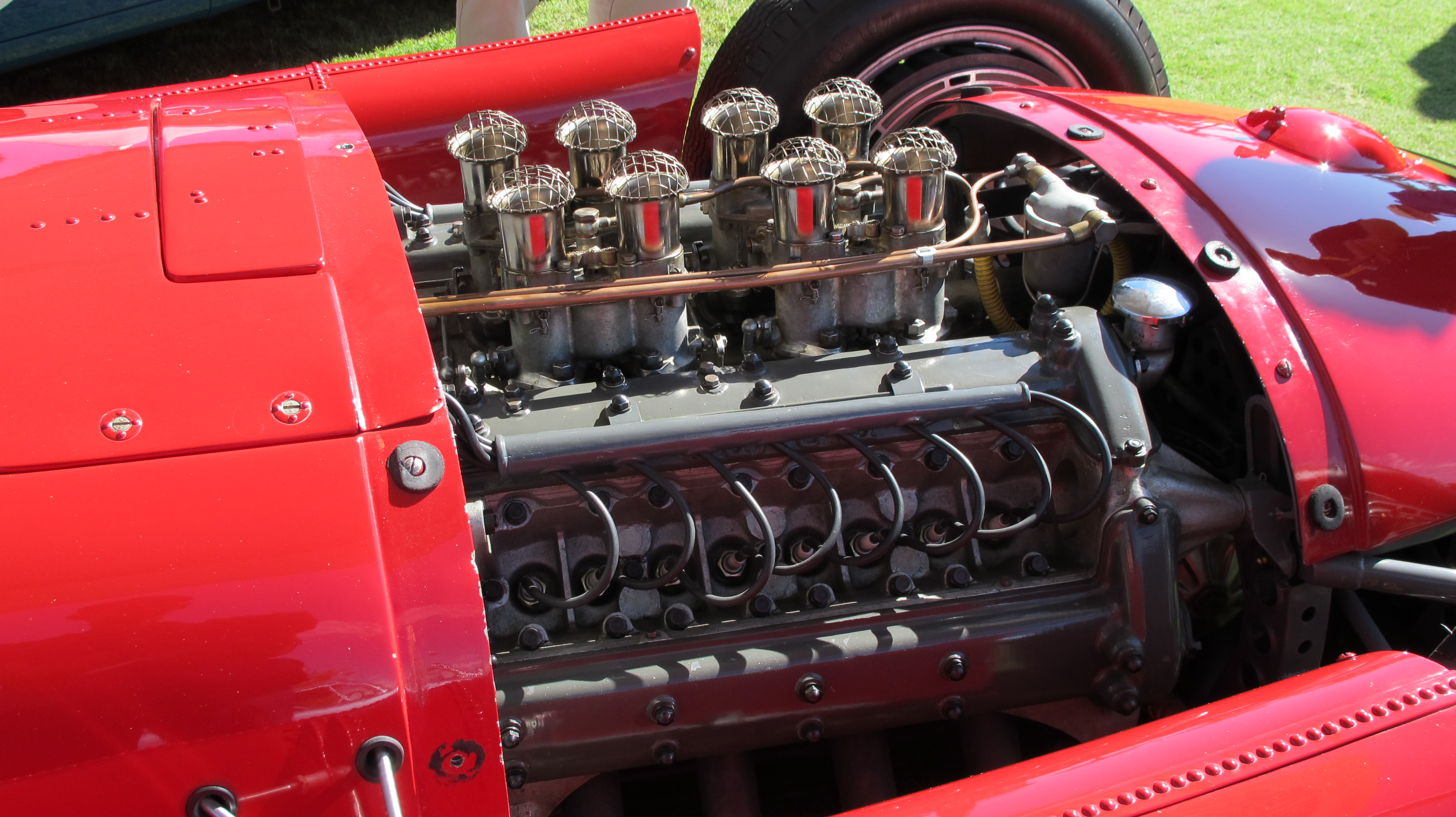
A 2.5L V8 in a Lancia-Ferrari D50 (1955–1956)

=== 1954–1960 ===
Naturally aspirated engine size was reduced to 2.5 L and supercharged cars were limited to 750 cc. No constructor built a supercharged engine for the World Championship. The Indianapolis 500 continued to use old pre-war regulations. The power range was up to 290 hp (216 kW).

=== 1961–1965 ===
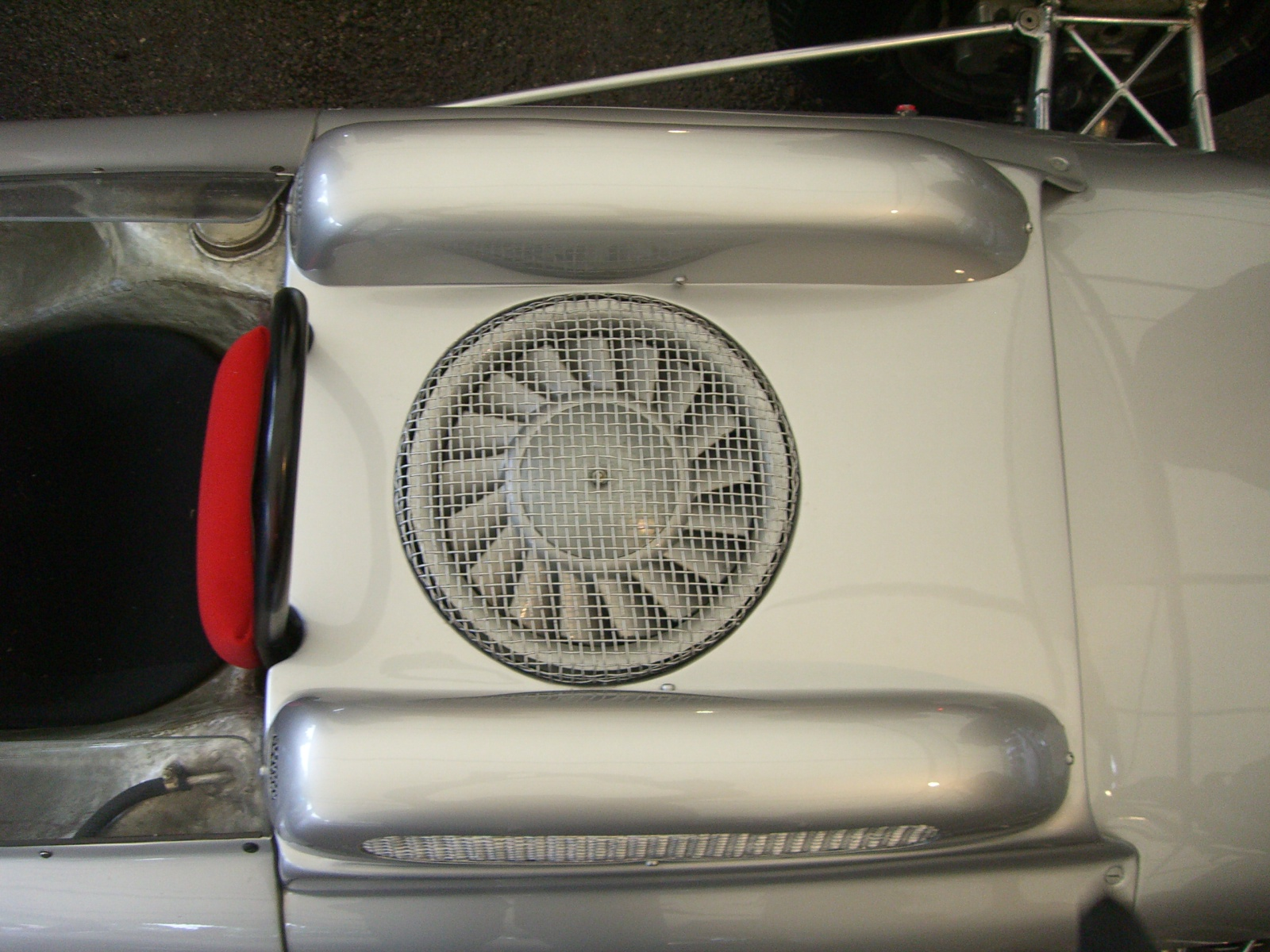
The Porsche 804 had a fan to cool the air-cooled flat-8 engine.

Introduced in 1961 amidst some criticism, the new reduced engine 1.5 L formula took control of F1 just as every team and manufacturer switched from front to mid-engined cars. Although these were initially underpowered, by 1965 average power had increased by nearly 50% and lap times were faster than in 1960. The old 2.5 L formula had been retained for International Formula racing, but this did not achieve much success until the introduction of the Tasman Series in Australia and New Zealand during the winter season, leaving the 1.5 L cars as the fastest single seaters in Europe during this time. The power range was between 150 hp (112 kW) and 225 hp (168 kW).

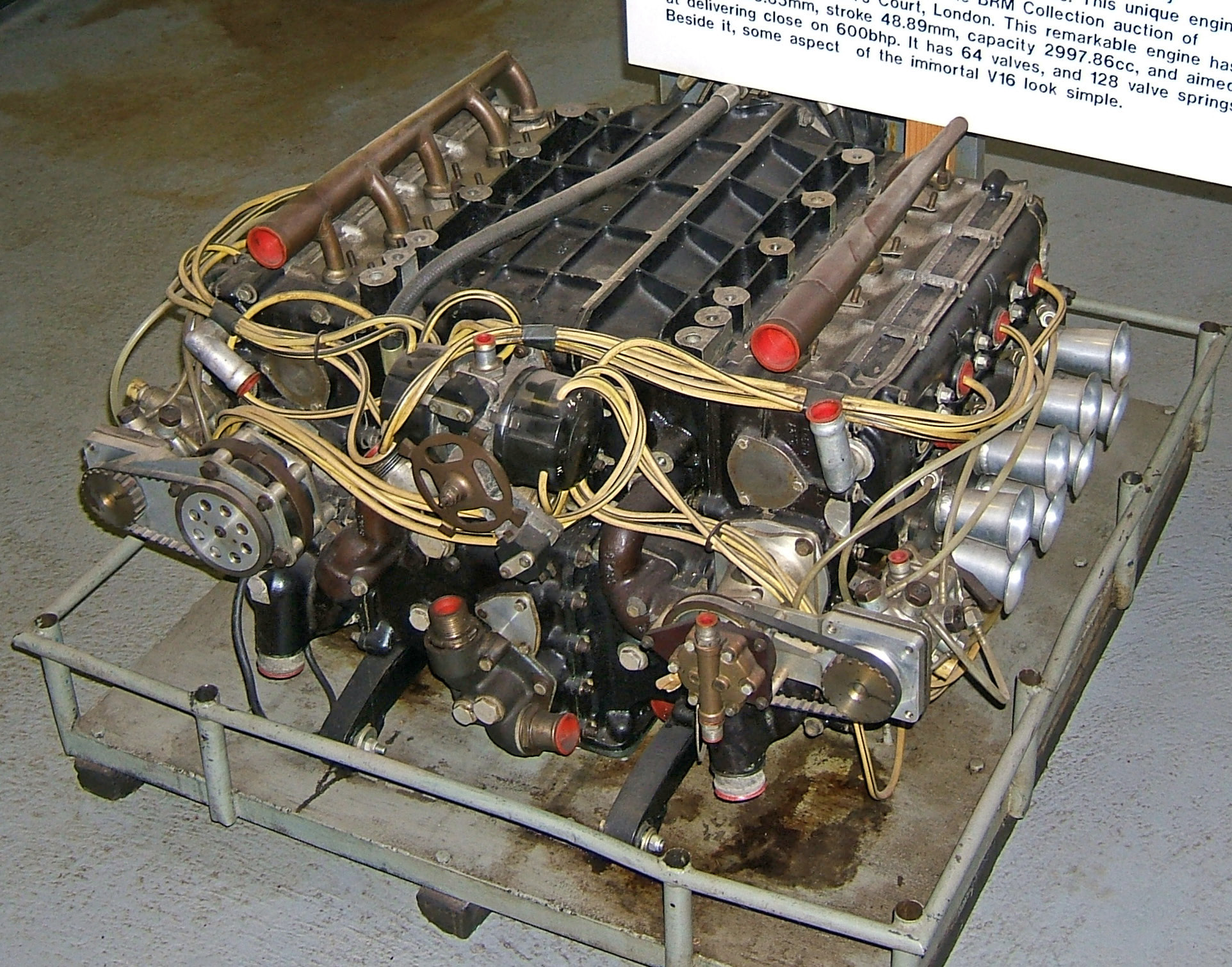
A 1968 British Racing Motors H16, 64-valve, Formula One engine

=== 1966–1985 ===
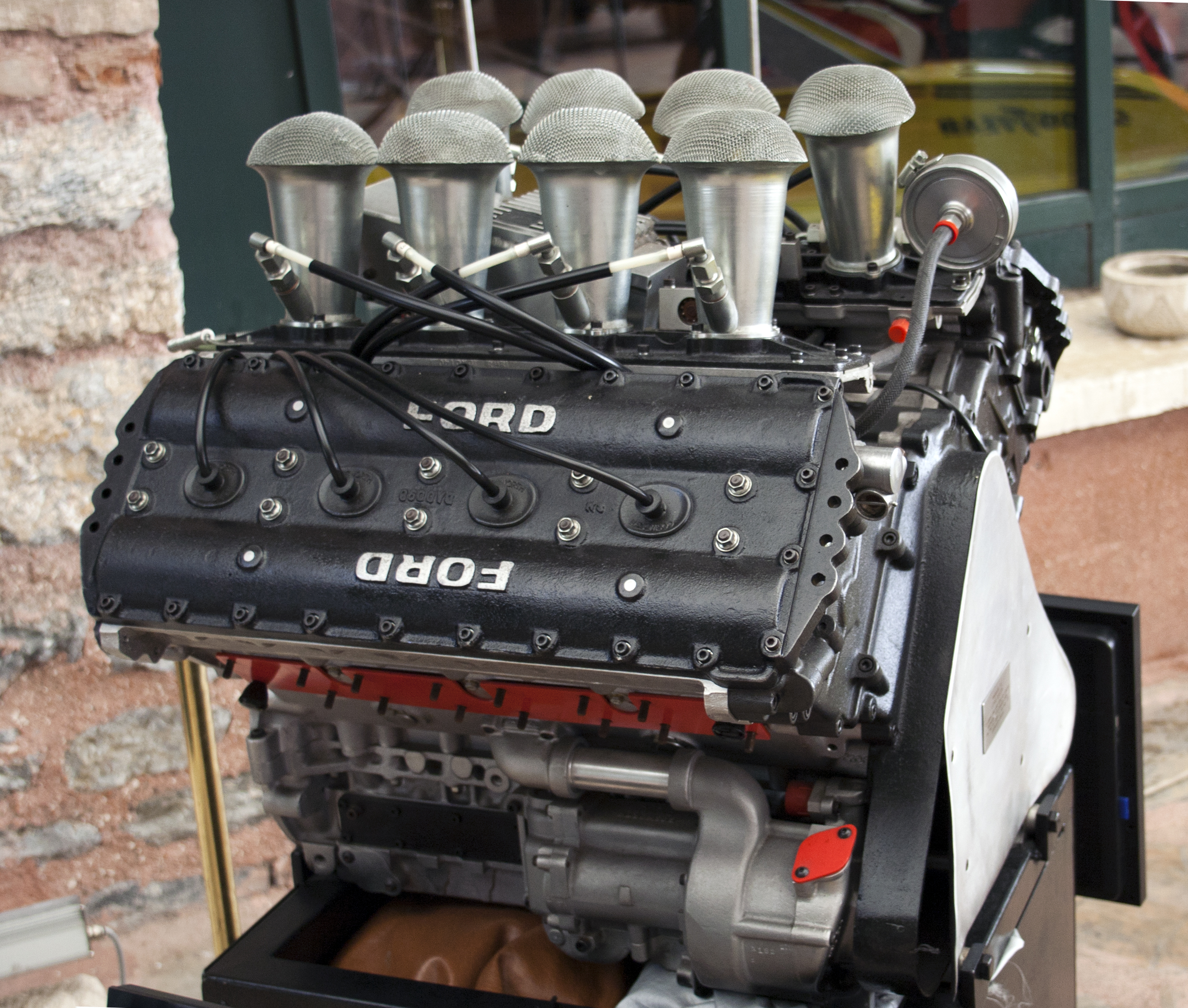
A Cosworth DFV 3-litre V8 Formula One engine

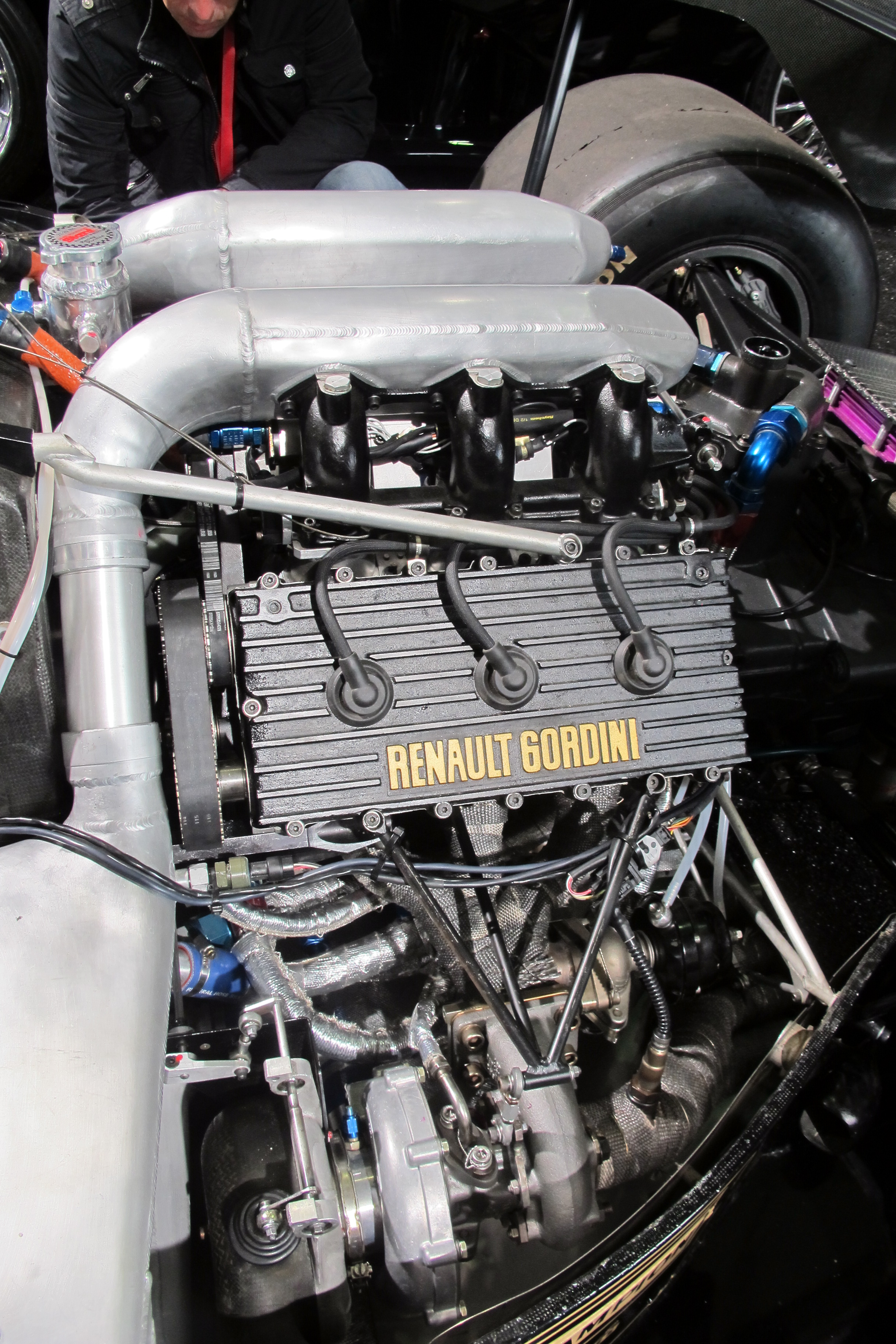
A Renault 1.5 litre turbo engine

In 1966, with sports cars capable of outrunning Formula One cars thanks to much larger and more powerful engines, the FIA increased engine capacity to 3.0 L atmospheric and 1.5 L compressed engines. Although a few manufacturers had been aiming for larger engines, the transition was not smooth and 1966 was a transitional year, with 2.0 L versions of the BRM and Coventry-Climax V8 engines being used by several entrants.

The Brabham team developed the 3.0L Repco-Brabham V8 based on the Oldsmobile F85 engine, while the BRM team developed the 3.0L BRM P75 H16 (two flat-8 engines geared together at the crankshafts) engine which raced in the BRM P83 Grand Prix car.

The appearance of the standard-produced Cosworth DFV 3.0L V8 in 1967, initially in the Lotus 49, made it possible for small manufacturers to join the series with a chassis designed in-house. The Cosworth DFV featured a revolutionary design where the engine formed the structure of the vehicle, as Colin Chapman explained: the engine was bolted directly to the monocoque, the gearbox was bolted directly to the engine, and rear suspension and rear wing if applicable were bolted directly to the gearbox. This design became the defacto standard design of a Grand Prix car and remains so to the present day.

Compression devices were allowed for the first time since 1960, but it was not until 1977 that a company actually had the finance and interest of building one, when Renault debuted their new Gordini V6 turbocharged engine at that year's British Grand Prix at Silverstone. This engine had a considerable power advantage over the naturally aspirated Cosworth DFV, Ferrari and Alfa Romeo engines.

By the start of the 1980s, Renault had proved that turbocharging was the way to go in order to stay competitive in Formula One, particularly at high-altitude circuits like Kyalami in South Africa and Interlagos in Brazil. Ferrari introduced their all-new V6 turbocharged engine in 1981, before Brabham owner Bernie Ecclestone managed to persuade BMW to manufacture straight-4 turbos for his team from 1982 onwards. In 1983, Alfa Romeo introduced a V8 turbo, and by the end of that year Honda and Porsche had introduced their own V6 turbos (the latter badged as TAG in deference to the company that provided the funding). Cosworth and the Italian Motori Moderni concern also manufactured V6 turbos during the 1980s, while Hart Racing Engines manufactured their own straight-4 turbo.

By mid-1985, every Formula One car was running with a turbocharged engine; the last to change was Tyrrell, who used the Cosworth DFY in both cars for the first six races, then entered four races with a DFY in one car and a Renault turbo in the other, before making the final switch to turbo in both cars for the last six races of the season. The power range from 1966 to 1986 was between 285 to 500 hp (210 to 370 kW), turbos 500 to 900 hp (370 to 670 kW) in race trim, and in qualifying, up to 1,400 hp (1,040 kW).

Following their experiences at Indianapolis, in the 1971 season Lotus entered three world championship Grands Prix with a Pratt & Whitney STN76 turbine fitted to the Lotus 56B chassis which also had four-wheel-drive, however this turbine car proved unsuccessful.

As part of the signing of the Formula One Concorde Agreement in 1981, the 1982 regulations permitted only four-stroke engines with a maximum of 12 cylinders with turbine, Wankel, Diesel, and two-stroke engines being prohibited from 1982.

=== 1986 ===
For the 1986 season, engines were limited by the FIA to a maximum of 1.5L with the permission of supercharging (turbocharging), i.e., the 3.0L naturally aspirated engines (which no teams were using by the end of the 1985 season anyway) were prohibited, in effect banning naturally aspirated engines for the 1986 season since a non-supercharged 1.5L engine would be uncompetitive.

In 1986, power figures were reaching unprecedented levels, with all engines reaching over 1,000 hp (750 kW) during qualifying with unrestricted turbo boost pressures. This was especially seen with the BMW straight-4 turbo, the M12/13, which produced around 1,400–1,500 hp (1,040–1,120 kW) at 5.5 bar of boost in qualifying trim, but was detuned to produce between 850–900 hp (630–670 kW) in race spec. However, these engines and gearboxes were very unreliable because of the engine's immense power, and would only last about four laps. For the race, the turbocharger's boost was restricted to ensure engine reliability; but the engines still produced 850–1,000 hp (630–750 kW) during the race.

The massively powerful BMW M12/13 inline-four found in the Brabham BT55 tilted almost horizontally, and in upright position under the Megatron brand in Arrows and Ligier, producing 900 bhp (670 kW) at 3.8 bar in race trim, and an incredible 1,400–1,500 bhp (1,040–1,120 kW) at 5.5 bar of boost in qualifying spec. Zakspeed was building its own turbo inline-four, Alfa Romeo was to power the Ligiers with an inline-four but the deal fell through after initial testing had been carried out. Alfa was still represented by its old 890T V8 used by Osella, and Minardi was powered by a Motori Moderni V6.

=== 1987–1988 ===
Naturally aspirated engines, now at up to 3.5L, were reintroduced for the 1987 season with a plan to retain the option for up to 1.5L supercharged engines for two seasons before their eventual ban in 1989. The 1987 technical regulations now specified that the only acceptable means of supercharging was via the use of one or more turbochargers.

The FIA regulations limited boost pressure, to 4 bar in qualifying in 1987 for 1.5 L turbosupercharged. Fuel tank sizes were further reduced in size to 150 litres for turbocharged cars to limit the amount of boost used in a race. These seasons were still dominated by turbocharged engines, the Honda RA167E V6 of Nelson Piquet winning the 1987 Formula One season in a Williams also winning the constructors championship, followed by the Honda RA168E V6 of Ayrton Senna winning the 1988 Formula One season in a McLaren who likewise won the constructors championship.

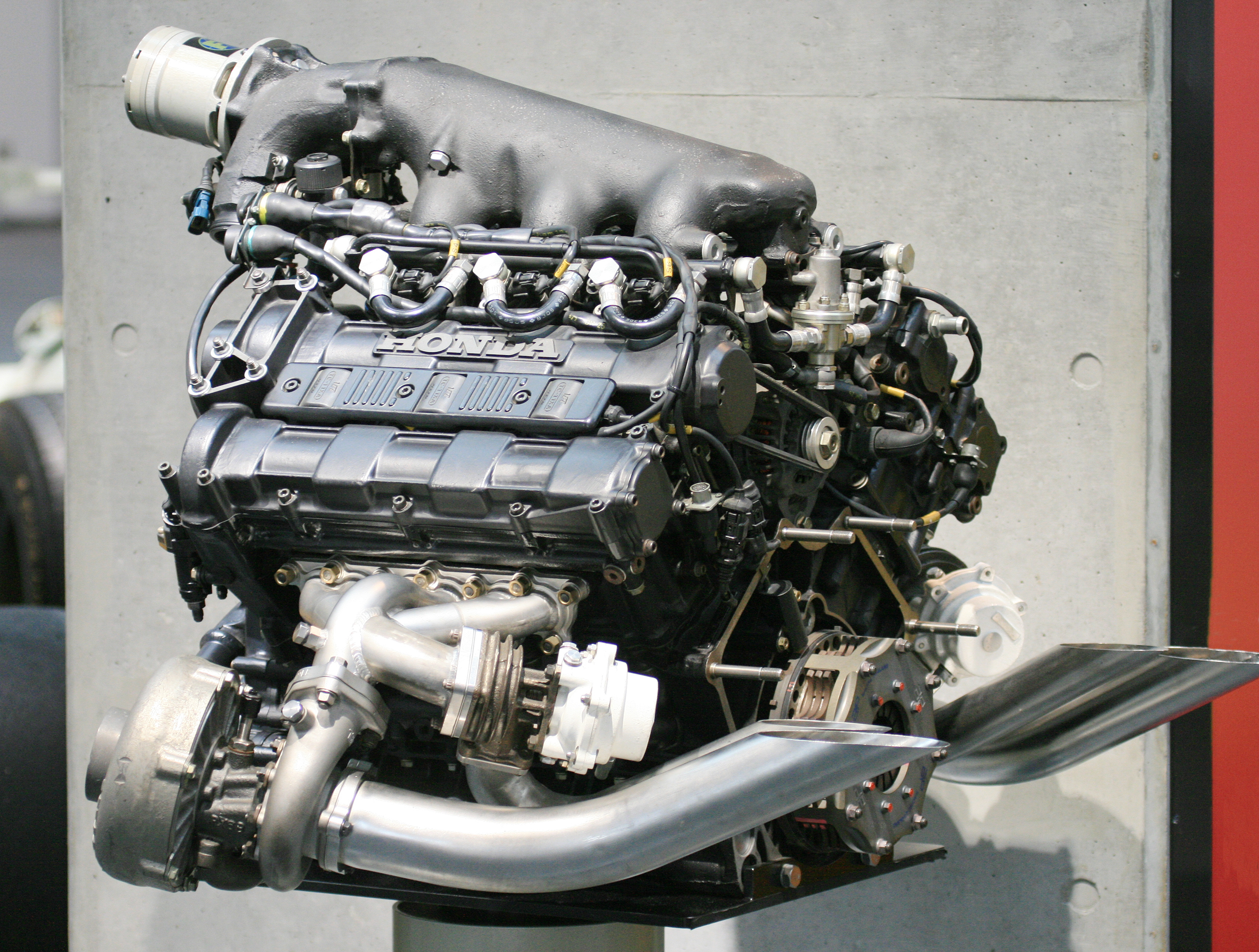
A 1988 Honda RA168E turbocharged V6 engine

The rest of the grid was powered by the Ford GBA V6 turbo in Benetton, with the only naturally aspirated engine, the DFV-derived Ford-Cosworth DFZ 3.5 L V8 outputting 575 hp (429 kW) in Tyrrell, Lola, AGS, March and Coloni. For the 1988 season, Benetton adopted the heavily revised 3.5L Ford DFR V8 while Williams, having lost their supply of Honda turbocharged engines, adopted a 3.5L Judd V8 for the 1988 season.

In 1988, six teams – McLaren, Ferrari, Lotus, Arrows, Osella and Zakspeed – continued with turbocharged engines, now limited to 2.5 bar. Honda's V6 turbo, the RA168E, which produced 685 hp (511 kW) at 12,300 rpm in qualifying, powered the McLaren MP4/4 with which Ayrton Senna and Alain Prost won fifteen of the sixteen races between them. The Italian Grand Prix was won by Gerhard Berger in the Ferrari F1/87/88C, powered by the team's own V6 turbo, the 033E, with about 720 hp (537 kW) at 12,000 rpm in qualifying and 620 hp (462 kW) at 12,000 rpm in races. The Honda turbo also powered Lotus's 100T, while Arrows continued with the Megatron-badged BMW turbo, Osella continued with the Alfa Romeo V8 (now badged as an Osella) and Zakspeed continued with their own straight-4 turbo. All the other teams used naturally aspirated 3.5 L V8 engines: Benetton used the Cosworth DFR, which produced 585 hp (436 kW) at 11,000 rpm; Williams, March and Ligier used the Judd CV, producing 600 hp (447 kW); and the rest of the grid used the previous year's 575 hp (429 kW) Cosworth DFZ.

=== 1989–1994 ===
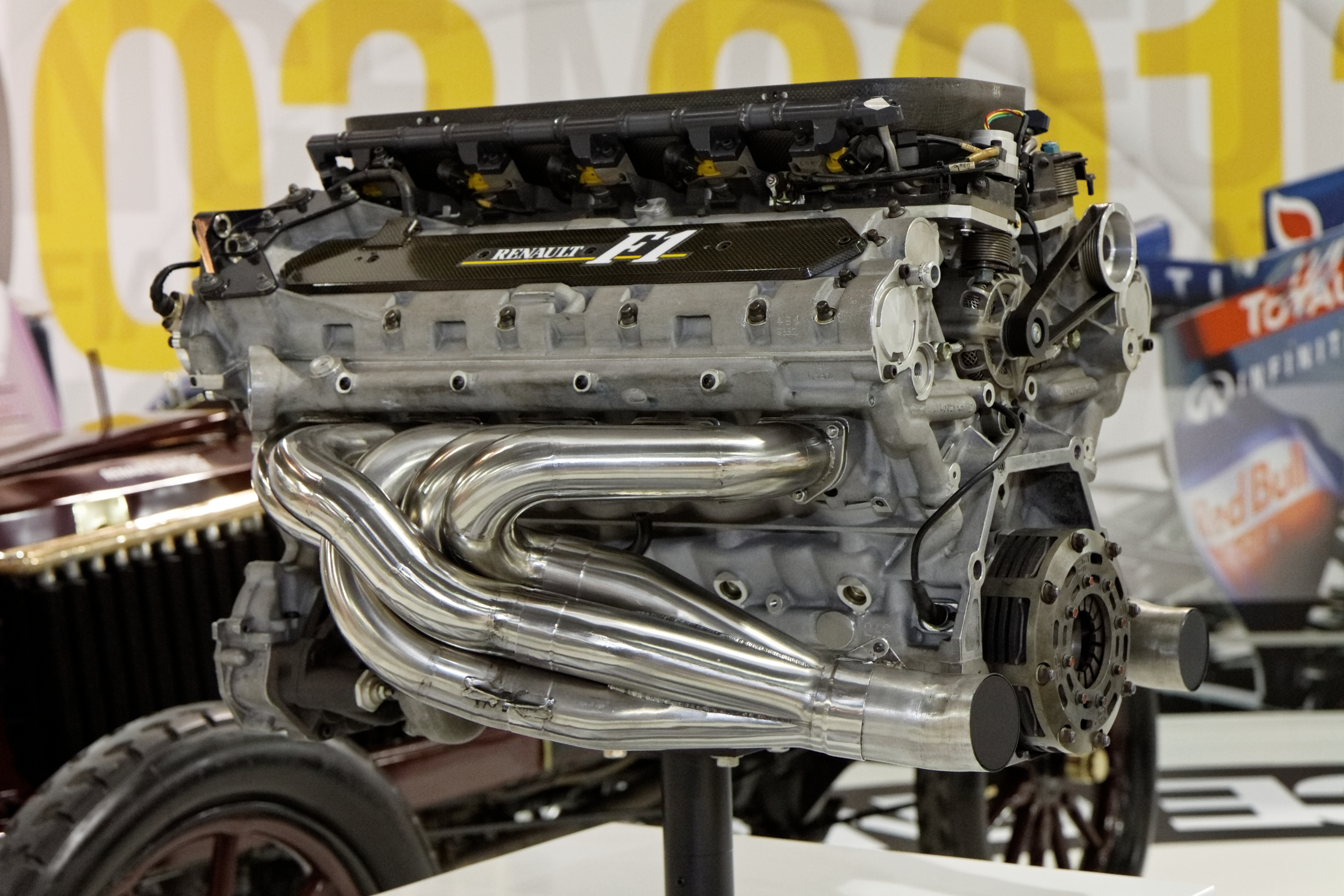
A 1990 Renault RS2 V10 engine

Turbochargers were banned from the 1989 Formula One season, leaving only a naturally aspirated 3.5 L formula. Honda was still dominant with their RA109E 72° V10 giving 685 hp (511 kW) @ 13,500 rpm on McLaren cars, enabling Prost to win the championship in front of his teammate Senna. Behind were the Renault RS1-powered Williams, a 67° V10 giving 650 hp (485 kW) @ 12,500 rpm and the Ferrari with its 035/5 65° V12 giving 660 hp (492 kW) at 13,000 rpm. Behind, the grid was powered mainly by Ford Cosworth DFR V8 giving 620 hp (462 kW) @ 10,750 rpm except for a few Judd CV V8 in Lotus, Brabham and EuroBrun cars, and two oddballs: the 620 hp (460 kW) Lamborghini 3512 80° V12 powering Lola, and the 560 hp (420 kW) Yamaha OX88 75° V8 in Zakspeed cars. Ford started to try its new design, the 75° V8 HBA1 with Benetton.

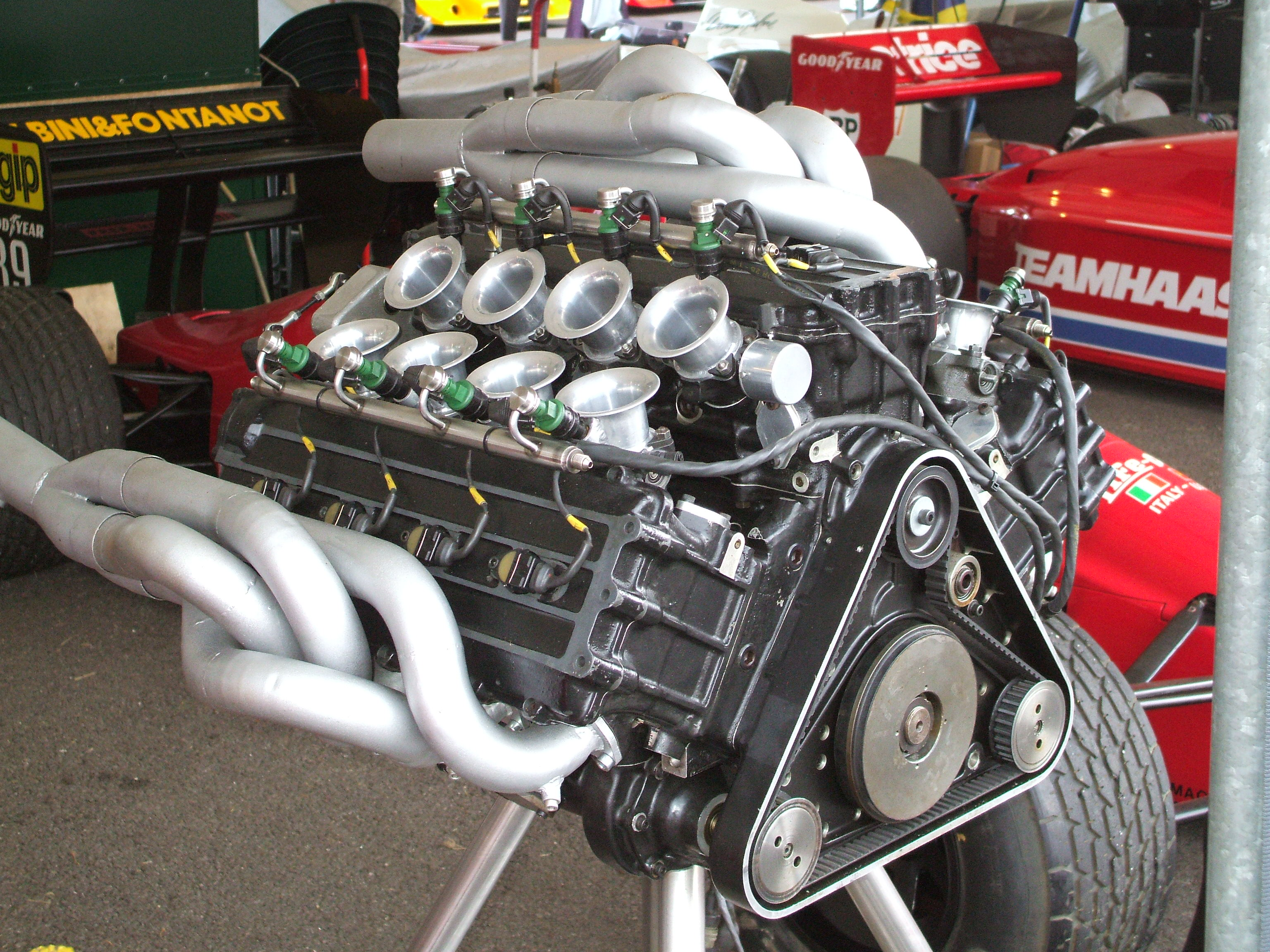
A 1990 W12 3.5 Formula One engine from the Life F1 car

The 1990 Formula One season was again dominated by Honda in McLarens with the 690 hp (515 kW) @ 13,500 rpm RA100E powering Ayrton Senna and Gerhard Berger ahead of the 680 hp (507 kW) @ 12,750 rpm Ferrari Tipo 036 of Alain Prost and Nigel Mansell. Behind them the Ford HBA4 for Benetton and Renault RS2 for Williams with 660 hp (492 kW) @ 12,800 rpm were leading the pack powered by Ford DFR and Judd CV engines. The exceptions were the Lamborghini 3512 in Lola and Lotus, and the new Judd EV 76° V8 giving 640 hp (477 kW) @ 12,500 rpm in Leyton House and Brabham cars. The two new contenders were the Life which built for themselves an F35 W12 with three four cylinders banks @ 60°, and Subaru giving Coloni a 1235 flat-12 from Motori Moderni

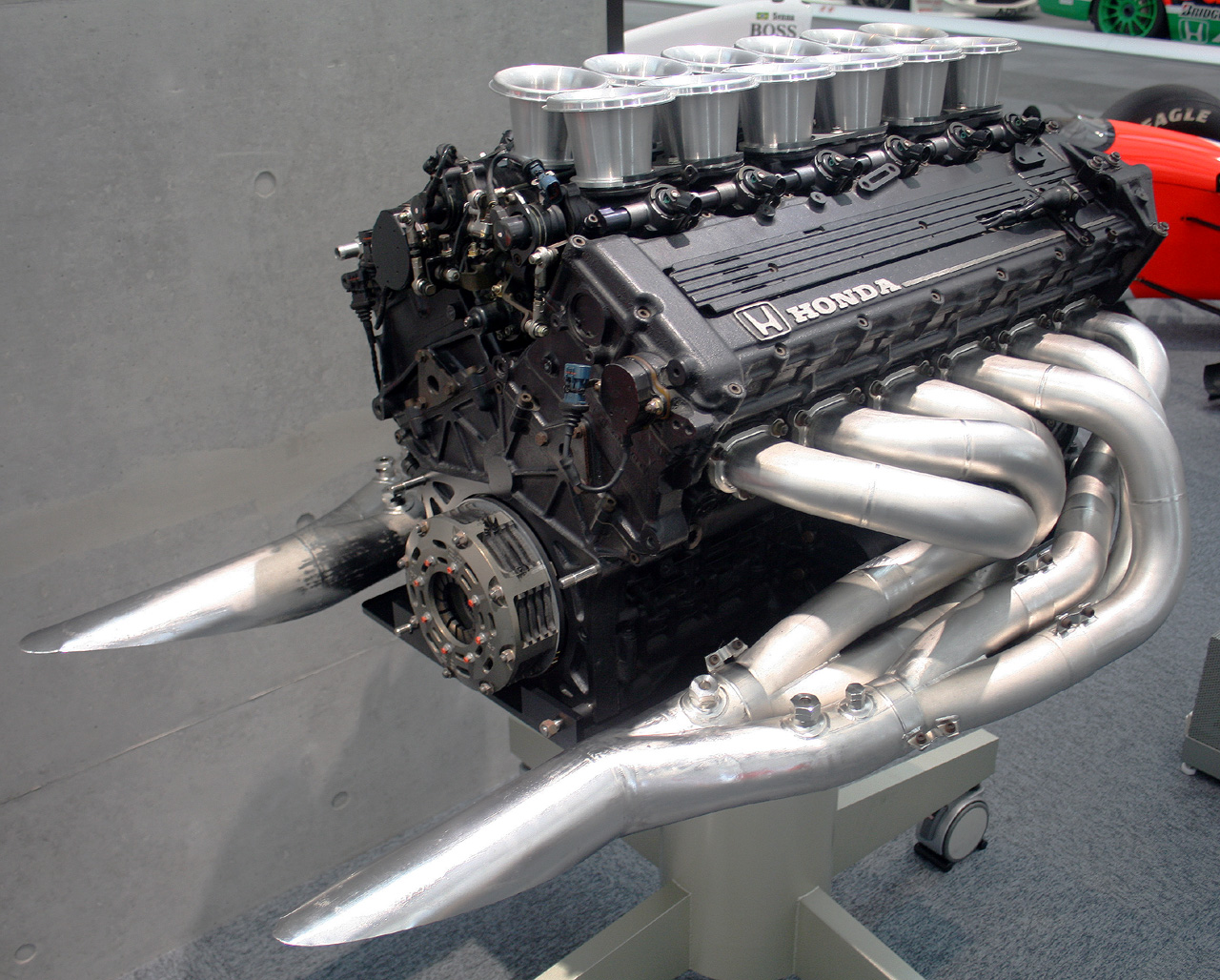
A 1991 Honda RA121E V12 engine

Honda was still leading the 1991 Formula One season in Senna's McLaren with the 725–780 hp (541–582 kW) @ 13,500–14,500 rpm 60° V12 RA121E, just ahead of the Renault RS3 powered Williams benefiting from 700–750 hp (520–560 kW) @ 12,500–13,000 rpm. Ferrari was behind with its Tipo 037, a new 65° V12 giving 710 hp (529 kW) @ 13,800 rpm also powering Minardi, just ahead the Ford HBA4/5/6 in Benetton and Jordan cars. Behind, Tyrrell was using the previous Honda RA109E, Judd introduced its new GV with Dallara leaving the previous EV to Lotus, Yamaha were giving its 660 hp (492 kW) OX99 70° V12 to Brabham, Lamborghini engines were used by Modena and Ligier. Ilmor introduced its LH10, a 680 hp (507 kW) @ 13,000 rpm V10 which eventually became the Mercedes with Leyton House and Porsche sourced a little successful 3512 V12 to Footwork Arrows; the rest of the field was Ford DFR powered.

In 1992, the Renault engines became dominant, even more so following the departure from the sport of Honda at the end of 1992. The 3.5 L Renault V10 engines powering the Williams F1 team produced a power output between 750–820 bhp (559–611 kW; 760–831 PS) @ 13,000–14,300 rpm toward the end of the 3.5 L naturally aspirated era, between 1992 and 1994. Renault-engined cars won the last three consecutive world constructors' championships of the 3.5 L formula era with Williams (1992–1994).

The Peugeot A4 V10, used by the McLaren Formula One team in 1994, initially developed 700 bhp (522 kW; 710 PS) @ 14,250 rpm. It was later further developed into the A6, which produced even more power, developing 760 bhp (567 kW; 771 PS) @ 14,500 rpm.

The EC Zetec-R V8, which powered the championship-winning Benetton team and Michael Schumacher in 1994, produced between 730–750 bhp (544–559 kW; 740–760 PS) @ 14,500 rpm.

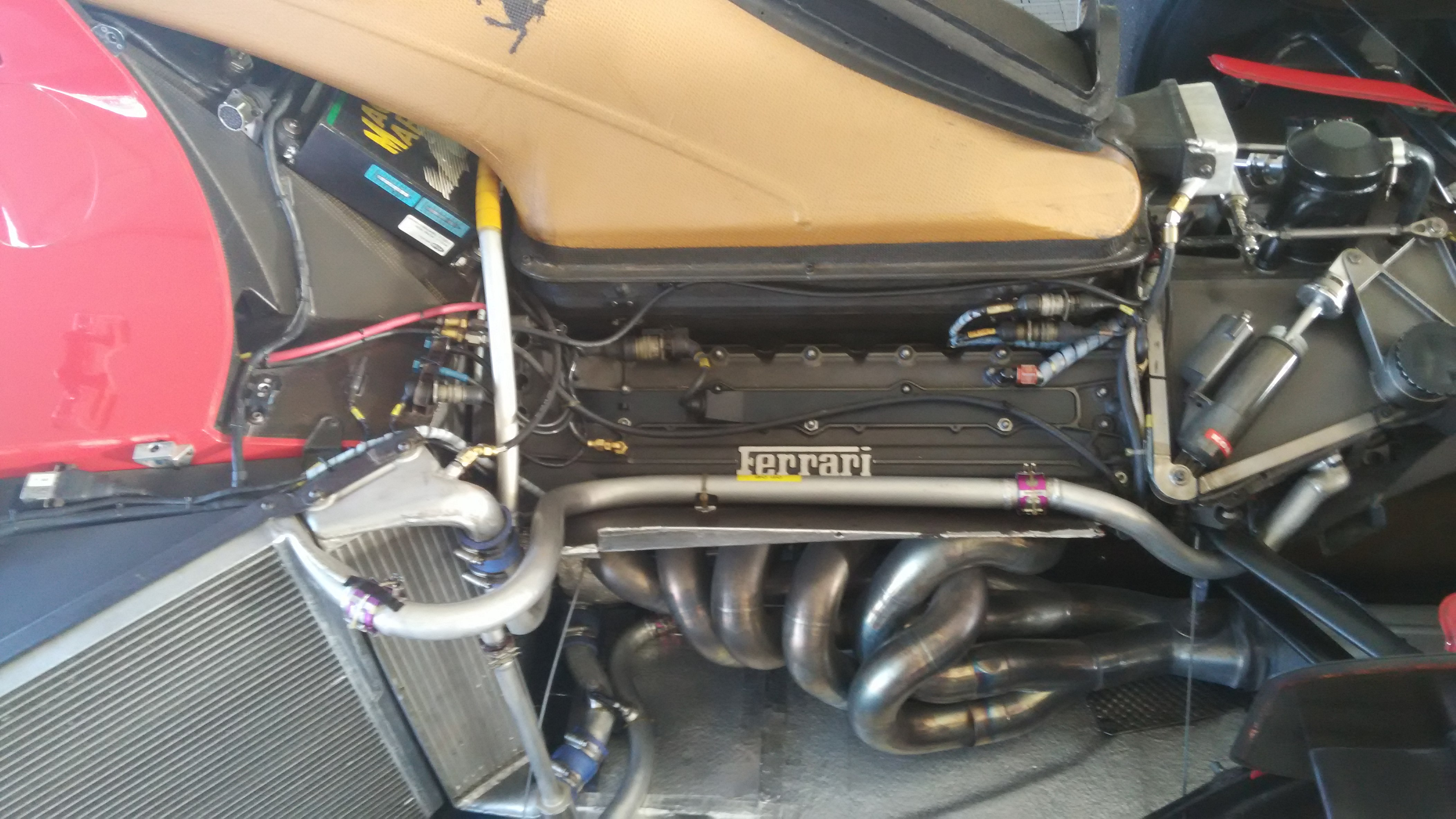
A 1994 Ferrari Tipo 043 3.5 V12 engine; the most powerful 3.5-litre engine in F1 history

By the end of the 1994 season, Ferrari's Tipo 043 V12 was putting out around 850 hp (634 kW) @ 15,800 rpm, which is to date the most powerful naturally aspirated V12 engine ever used in Formula One. This was also the most powerful engine of 3.5-litre engine regulation era, before a reduction in engine capacity to 3 litres in 1995.

=== 1995–2005 ===
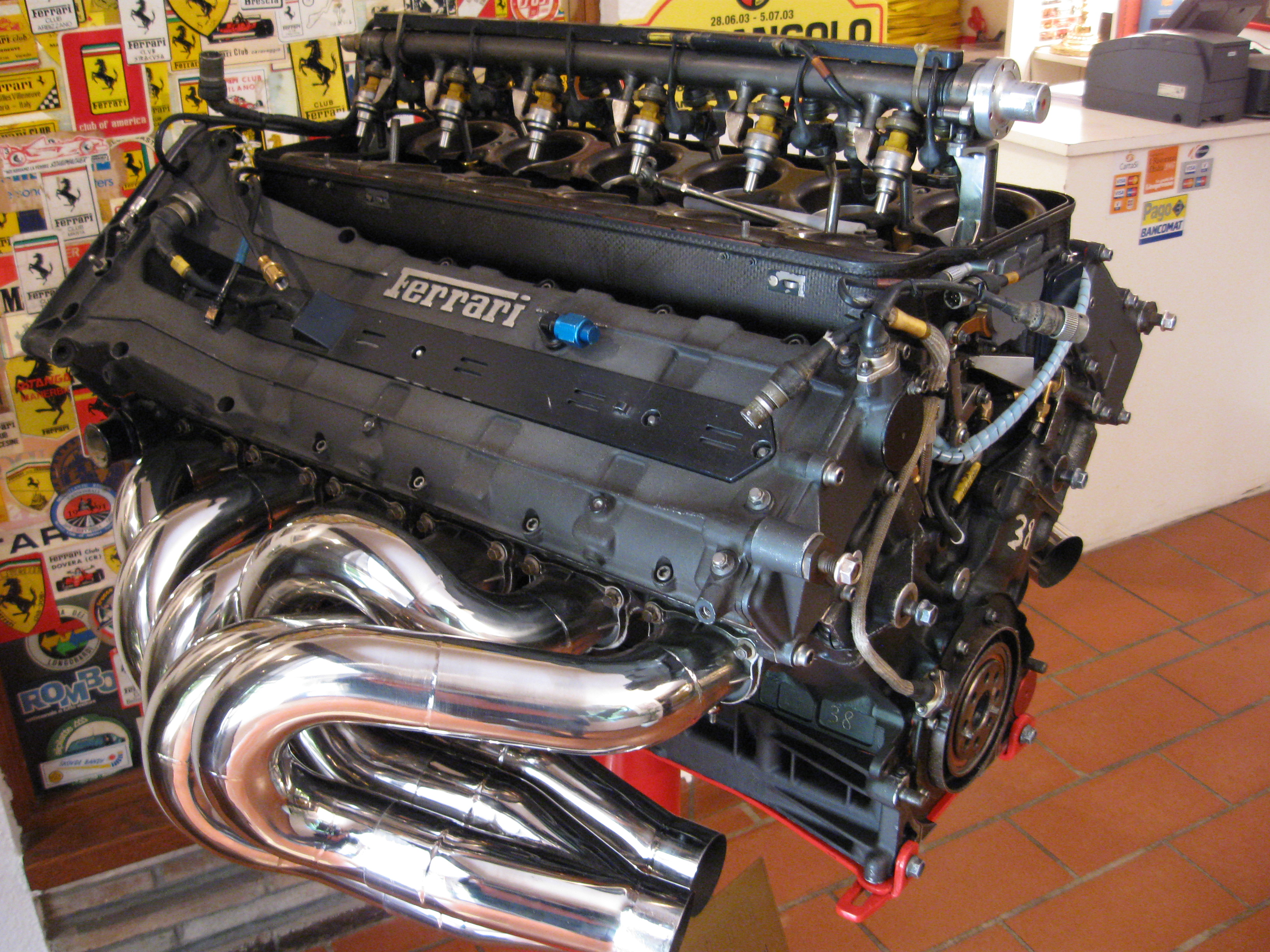
A Ferrari Tipo 044/1 3.0-litre V12 F1 engine (1995)

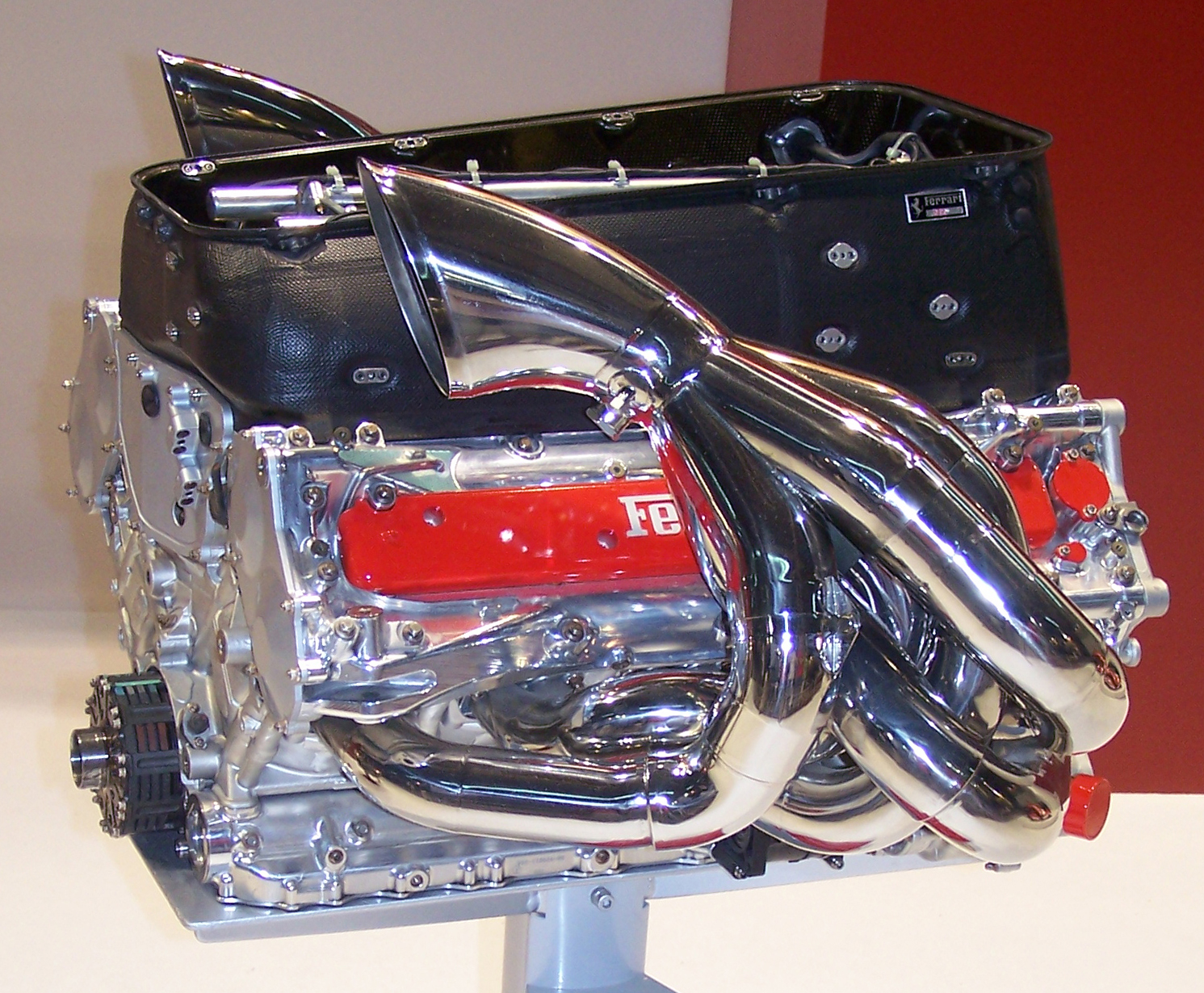
A 2004 Ferrari model 053 V10 engine of the Ferrari F2004

This era used a 3.0 L formula, with the power range varying (depending on engine tuning) between 600 hp (447 kW) and 1,000 hp (746 kW), between 13,000 rpm and 20,000 rpm, and from eight to twelve cylinders. Despite engine displacement being reduced from 3.5 L, power figures and RPMs still managed to climb. Renault was the initial dominant engine supplier from 1995 until 1997, winning the first three world championships with Williams and Benetton in this era. The championship-winning 1995 Benetton B195 produced a power output of 675 hp (503.3 kW) @ 15,200 rpm, and the 1996 championship-winning Williams FW18 produced 700 hp (522.0 kW) @ 16,000 rpm; both from a shared Renault RS8 3.0 L V10 engine. The 1997 championship-winning FW19 produced between 730–760 hp (544.4–566.7 kW) @ 16,000 rpm, from its Renault RS9B 3.0 L V10. Ferrari's last V12 engine, the Tipo 044/1, was used in 1995. The engine's design was largely influenced by major regulation changes imposed by the FIA after the dreadful events during the year before: the V12 engine was reduced from 3.5 to 3.0 litres. The 3.0-litre engine produced around 700 hp (522 kW) 17,000 rpm in race trim; but was reportedly capable of producing up to 760 hp (567 kW) in its highest state of tune for qualification mode. Between 1995 and 2000, cars using this 3.0 L engine formula, imposed by the FIA, produced a constant power range (depending on engine type and tuning), varying between 600 hp and 815 hp. Most Formula One cars during the 1997 season comfortably produced a consistent power output of between 665–760 hp (495.9–566.7 kW), depending on whether a V8 or V10 engine configuration was used. From 1998 to 2000 it was Mercedes' power that ruled, giving Mika Häkkinen two world championships. The 1999 McLaren MP4/14 produced between 785 and 810 hp @ 17,000 rpm. Ferrari gradually improved their engine. In 1996, they changed from their traditional V12 engine to a smaller and lighter V10 engine. They preferred reliability to power, losing out to Mercedes in terms of outright power initially. Ferrari's first V10 engine, in 1996, produced 715 hp (533 kW) @ 15,550 rpm, down on power from their most powerful 3.5 L V12 (in 1994), which produced over 830 hp (619 kW) @ 15,800 rpm, but up on power from their last 3.0 L V12 (in 1995), which produced 700 hp (522 kW) @ 17,000 rpm. At the 1998 Japanese GP, Ferrari's 047D engine spec was said to produce over 800 bhp (600 kW), and from 2000 onward, they were never short of power or reliability. To keep costs down, the 3.0 L V10 engine configuration was made fully mandatory for all teams in 2000 so that engine builders would not develop and experiment with other configurations. The V10 configuration had been the most popular since the banning of turbocharged engines in 1989, and no other configuration had been used since 1998.

BMW started supplying its engines to Williams from 2000. The engine was very reliable in the first season though slightly short of power compared to Ferrari and Mercedes units. The BMW E41-powered Williams FW22 produced around 810 hp @ 17,500 rpm, during the 2000 season. BMW went straight forward with its engine development. The P81, used during the 2001 season, was able to hit 17,810 rpm. Unfortunately, reliability was a large issue with several blowups during the season.

The BMW P82, the engine used by the BMW WilliamsF1 Team in 2002, had hit a peak speed of 19,050 rpm in its final evolutionary stage. It was also the first engine in the 3.0 litre V10-era to break through the 19,000 rpm wall, during the 2002 Italian Grand Prix's qualifying. BMW's P83 engine used in 2003 season managed an impressive 19,200 rpm and cleared the 900 bhp (670 kW) mark, at around 940 bhp, and weighs less than 200 lb (91 kg). Honda's RA003E V10 also cleared the 900 bhp (670 kW) mark at the 2003 Canadian Grand Prix.

In 2005, no more than 5 valves per cylinder were permitted. Also, the FIA introduced new regulations limiting each car to one engine per two Grand Prix weekends, putting the emphasis on increased reliability. In spite of this, power outputs continued to rise. Mercedes engines had about 930 bhp (690 kW) in this season. Cosworth, Mercedes, Renault, and Ferrari engines all produced around 900 bhp (670 kW) to 940 bhp (700 kW) @ 19,000 rpm. Honda had over 965 bhp (720 kW). The BMW engine made over 950 bhp (710 kW). Toyota engines had over 1,000 bhp (750 kW), according to Toyota Motorsport's executive Vice President, Yoshiaki Kinoshita. However, for reliability and longevity purposes, this power figure may have been detuned to around 960 bhp (720 kW) for races.

=== 2006–2013 ===
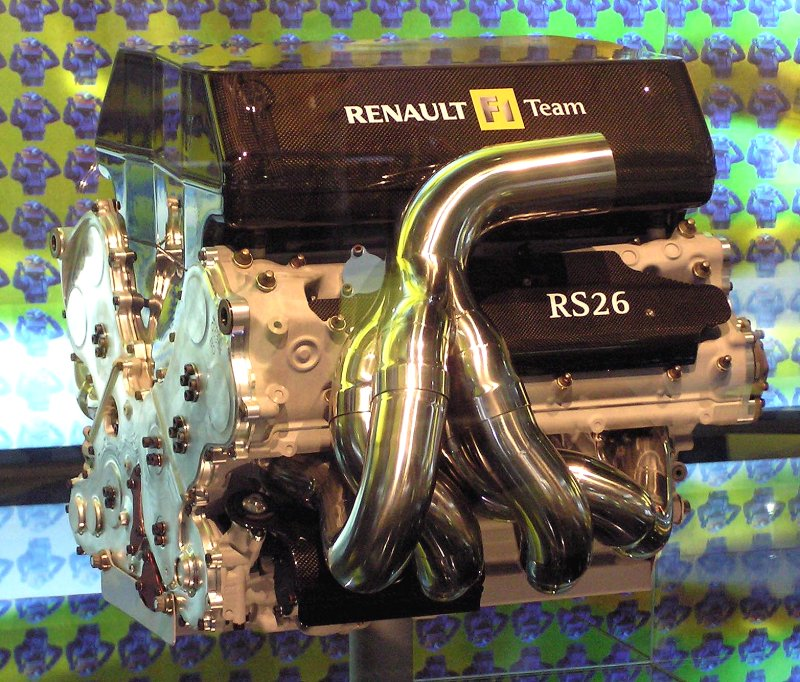
A Renault RS26 2.4 V8 engine (2006)

For 2006, the engines had to be 90° V8 of 2.4 litres maximum capacity with a circular bore of 98 mm (3.9 in) maximum, which implies a 39.75 mm (1.565 in) stroke at maximum bore. The engines must have two inlet and two exhaust valves per cylinder, be naturally aspirated and have a 95 kg (209 lb) minimum weight. The previous year's engines with a rev-limiter were permitted for 2006 and 2007 for teams who were unable to acquire a V8 engine, with Scuderia Toro Rosso using a Cosworth V10, after Red Bull's takeover of the former Minardi team did not include the new engines. The 2006 season saw the highest rev limits in the history of Formula One, at well over 20,000 rpm; before a 19,000 rpm mandatory rev limiter was implemented for all competitors in 2007. Cosworth was able to achieve just over 20,000 rpm with their V8, and Renault around 20,500 rpm. Honda did the same, albeit only on the dynamometer.

Pre-cooling air before it enters the cylinders, injection of any substance other than air and fuel into the cylinders, variable-geometry intake and exhaust systems, and variable valve timing were forbidden. Each cylinder could have only one fuel injector and a single plug spark ignition. Separate starting devices were used to start engines in the pits and on the grid. The crankcase and cylinder block had to be made of cast or wrought aluminium alloys. The crankshaft and camshafts had to be made from an iron alloy, pistons from an aluminium alloy, and valves from alloys based on iron, nickel, cobalt or titanium. These restrictions were in place to reduce development costs on the engines.

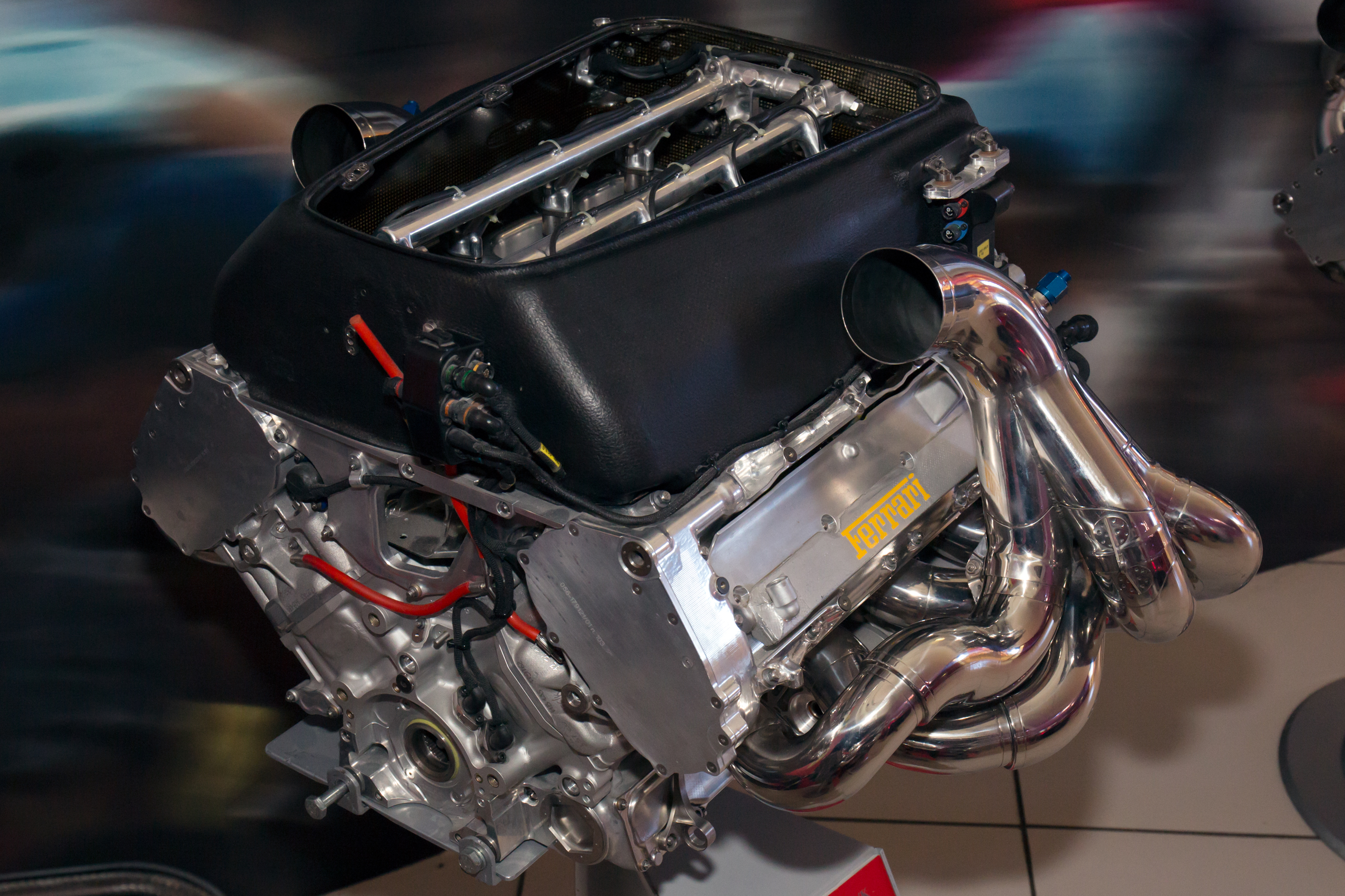
A Ferrari Tipo 056 2.4 L V8 engine

The reduction in capacity was designed to give a power reduction of around 20% from the three-litre engines, to reduce the increasing speeds of Formula One cars. Despite this, in many cases the performance of the car improved. In 2006 Toyota F1 announced an approximate 740 hp (552 kW) output at 18,000 rpm for its new RVX-06 engine, but real figures are of course difficult to obtain. Most cars from this period (2006–2008) produced a regular power output of approximately between 720 and 800 hp @ 19,000 rpm (over 20,000 rpm for the 2006 season).

The engine specification was frozen in 2007 to keep development costs down. The engines which were used in the 2006 Japanese Grand Prix were used for the 2007 and 2008 seasons and they were limited to 19,000 rpm. In 2009 the limit was reduced to 18,000 rpm with each driver allowed to use a maximum of 8 engines over the season. Any driver needing an additional engine is penalised 10 places on the starting grid for the first race the engine is used. This increases the importance of reliability, although the effect is only seen towards the end of the season. Certain design changes intended to improve engine reliability may be carried out with permission from the FIA. This has led to some engine manufacturers, notably Ferrari and Mercedes, exploiting this ability by making design changes which not only improve reliability but also boost engine power output as a side effect. As the Mercedes engine was proven to be the strongest, re-equalisations of engines were allowed by the FIA to allow other manufacturers to match the power.

2009 saw the exit of Honda from Formula One. The team was acquired by Ross Brawn, creating Brawn GP and the BGP 001. With the absence of the Honda engine, Brawn GP retrofitted the Mercedes engine to the BGP 001 chassis. The newly branded team won both the Constructors' Championship and the Drivers' Championship from better-known and better-established contenders Ferrari, McLaren-Mercedes, and Renault.

Cosworth, absent since the end of the 2006 season, returned in 2010. New teams Lotus Racing, HRT, and Virgin Racing, along with the established Williams, used this engine. The season also saw the withdrawal of the BMW and Toyota engines, as the car companies withdrew from Formula One due to the Great Recession.

In 2009, constructors were allowed to use kinetic energy recovery systems (KERS), also called regenerative brakes. Energy can either be stored as mechanical energy (as in a flywheel) or as electrical energy (as in a battery or supercapacitor), with a maximum power of 81 hp (60 kW; 82 PS) deployed by an electric motor, for a little over 6 seconds per lap. Four teams used it at some point in the season: Ferrari, Renault, BMW, and McLaren.

Although KERS was still legal in F1 in the 2010 season, all the teams agreed not to use it. KERS returned for the 2011 season, when only three teams elected not to use it. For the 2012 season, only Marussia and HRT raced without KERS, and in 2013 all teams on the grid had KERS. From 2010 to 2013 cars have a regular power of 700–800 hp, averaging around 750 hp @ 18,000 rpm.

=== 2014–2025 ===
The FIA announced a change from the 2.4-litre V8, introducing 1.6-litre V6 hybrid engines (more than one power source) for the 2014 season. The new regulations allow kinetic and heat energy recovery systems. Forced induction was now allowed – either turbochargers, which last appeared in 1988, or superchargers – with all constructors opting to use a turbocharger. Instead of limiting the boost level, the regulations introduced a fuel flow restriction at 100 kg of petrol per hour maximum. The engines sounded very different from the previous formula, due to the lower rev limit (15,000 rpm) and the turbocharger. The introduction of these systems in 2014 significantly altered race strategies and team budgets. Energy recovery and deployment strategies became critical factors in race outcomes. On top of that the complexity and cost of developing these hybrid systems led to substantial increases in team spending. This financial strain contributed to the FIA's decision to implement a cost cap starting in the 2021 season, aiming to ensure a more level playing field among teams.

The new formula for turbocharged engines have their efficiency improved through turbo-compounding by recovering energy from exhaust gases. The original proposal for four-cylinder turbocharged engines was not welcomed by the racing teams, in particular Ferrari. Adrian Newey stated during the 2011 European Grand Prix that the change to a V6 enables teams to carry the engine as a stressed member, whereas an inline-4 would have required a space frame. A compromise was reached, allowing V6 forced induction engines instead. The engines rarely exceed 12,000 rpm during qualifying and race, due to the new fuel flow restrictions.

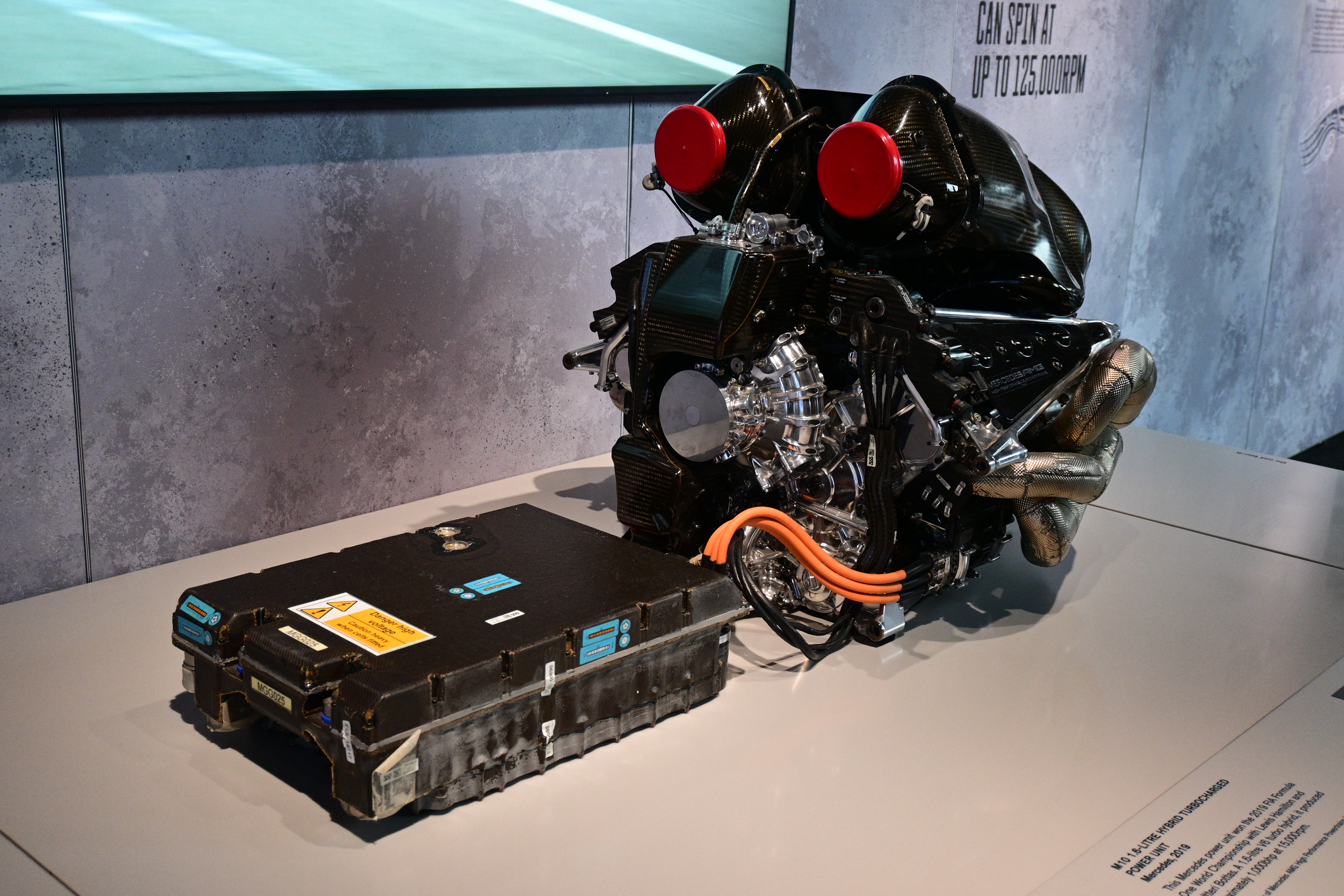
The M10 EQ Power+ that powered the Mercedes AMG F1 W10 EQ Power+ which took both championships in 2019

Energy recovery systems such as KERS had a boost of 160 hp (120 kW) and 2 megajoules per lap. KERS was renamed Motor Generator Unit–Kinetic (MGU-K). Heat energy recovery systems were also allowed, under the name Motor Generator Unit–Heat (MGU-H).

The 2015 season was an improvement on 2014, adding about 30–50 hp (20–40 kW) to most engines, the Mercedes engine being the most powerful with 870 hp (649 kW). In 2019, Renault's engine was claimed to have hit 1,000 hp in qualifying trim.

Of the previous manufacturers, only Mercedes, Ferrari and Renault produced engines to the new formula in 2014, whereas Cosworth stopped supplying engines. Honda returned as an engine manufacturer in 2015, with McLaren switching to Honda power after using the Mercedes engine in 2014.

In January 2018, the FIA issued a technical directive to prevent engine manufacturers from supplying customer teams with unequal engines, ensuring engine performance parity with works teams.

In 2019, Red Bull switched from using a Renault engine to Honda power. Honda supplied both Red Bull and AlphaTauri. Honda withdrew as a power unit supplier at the end of 2021, with Red Bull taking over the project and producing the engine in-house.

In 2017, the FIA began negotiations with existing constructors and potential new manufacturers over the next generation of engines with a projected introduction date of 2021 but delayed to 2022 due to the effects of the COVID-19 pandemic. The initial proposal was designed to simplify engine designs, cut costs, promote new entries and address criticisms directed at the 2014 generation of engines. It called for the 1.6 L V6 configuration to be retained, but abandoned the complex Motor Generator Unit–Heat (MGU-H) system. The Motor Generator Unit–Kinetic (MGU-K) would be more powerful, with a greater emphasis on driver deployment and a more flexible introduction to allow for tactical use. The proposal also called for the introduction of standardised components and design parameters to make components produced by all manufacturers compatible with one another in a system dubbed "plug in and play". A further proposal to allow four-wheel drive cars was also made, with the front axle driven by an MGU-K unit—as opposed to the traditional driveshaft—that functioned independently of the MGU-K providing power to the rear axle, mirroring the system developed by Porsche for the 919 Hybrid race car.

However, mostly due to no new engine supplier applying for F1 entry in 2021 and 2022, the abolishment of MGU-H, a more powerful MGU-K and a four-wheel drive system were all shelved with the possibility of their re-introduction for 2026. Instead, the teams and FIA agreed to a radical change in body/chassis aerodynamics to promote more battles on the course at closer distances to each other. They further agreed to an increase in alcohol content from 5.75% to 10% of fuel, and to implement a freeze on power unit design for 2022–2025, with the internal combustion engine (ICE), turbocharger and MGU-H being frozen on 1 March and the energy store, MGU-K and control electronics being frozen on 1 September during the 2022 season. Honda, the outgoing engine supplier in 2021, was keen to keep the MGU-H, and Red Bull, who took over the engine production project, backed that opinion. The 4WD system was planned to be based on Porsche 919 Hybrid system, but Porsche ended up not becoming an F1 engine supplier for 2021–2022.

=== 2026–2030 ===
New engine regulations were introduced for the 2026 season. These engine regulations retain the turbocharged 1.6 V6 internal combustion engine configuration used since 2014. The new power units produce over 1,000 bhp (750 kW), although with a greatly increased reliance on electrical energy, resulting in an approximately 50-50 split between combustion and electrical power. The costly and complex MGU-H (Motor Generator Unit – Heat) has been removed, while the MGU-K's (Motor Generator Unit – Kinetic) output has been increased to 470 bhp (350 kW) from 160 bhp (120 kW). The power output of the internal combustion part of the power unit has decreased to 540 bhp (400 kW) from 850 bhp (630 kW). In addition, fuel flow rates have been limited based on theoretical energy available from rule-specified unified composition, rather than mass of the various fuel from different sources. There is also intended to be further restrictions on components such as MGU-Ks and exhausts imposed from 2027. The power units are run on a fully sustainable fuel, developed by the FIA.

Audi became a new engine supplier in 2026 along with their team's entry to the F1 grid. Ford began a partnership with Red Bull Powertrains as Red Bull Ford Powertrains from 2026 after a 21-year absence from Formula One. Honda, under its subsidiary Honda Racing Corporation, has also entered as a manufacturer for 2026 according to the FIA after officially leaving the sport in 2021. Critics argued that the restart procedure contravened the sporting regulations. However, on 30 September 2024, owing to lack of strong results with its power unit during the V6 turbo-hybrid era since it began in 2014, Renault announced it would be ending its engine programme following the conclusion of the 2025 championship and would not be making engines for the new 2026 regulations, with the Alpine team switching to Mercedes power units from 2026. A 2025 FIA proposal to end the 2026 engine formula for 2028 and switch to sustainably fuelled naturally aspirated V10 engines was rejected by teams. On 23 April 2025, the FIA confirmed that General Motors through its Cadillac brand would become a power unit supplier from the 2029 season onwards. The Cadillac Formula One Team were already announced as joining the grid from the 2026 season onwards using customer Ferrari power units for an interim period whilst the Cadillac engine is developed.

==== 2027 ====
Criticisms about the 2026 regulations were raised with the FIA following observations that the engine has become over-reliant on energy management, with the cars losing speed on long straights due to "super clipping", and abnormal differences with their closing speeds while energy is deployed compared to harvesting it. After tweaks were made before the Miami Grand Prix, inclucing an increase to the "super clipping" limit from 340 bhp (250 kW) to 470 bhp (350 kW), the FIA decided the week after the race that Formula One would move away from the current 50-50 split between combustion and electrical power to a provisional 60/40 split, with the ICE's power increasing by 67 bhp (50 kW) through a fuel flow rate increase. Further tweaks are planned before the regulation changes are ratified.

=== Engine regulation progression by era ===
Years	Operating principle	Maximum displacement		Configuration	RPM limit	Fuel flow limit (Q_{max})	Fuel composition	
Years	Operating principle	Naturally aspirated	Forced induction	Configuration	RPM limit	Fuel flow limit (Q_{max})	Alcohol	Petrol
1947–1953 (Note: For 1952 and 1953, World Championship races were run to Formula Two rules (0.75 L with compressor, 2 L without), but Formula One regulations remained intact.)	Unspecified	4.5 L	1.5 L	Unrestricted	Unrestricted	Unrestricted	Unrestricted (Note: Various combination of petrol, alcohol, nitro-methane/benzine, and tetraethyl lead were used.)	
1954–1957	Unspecified	2.5 L	0.75 L	Unrestricted	Unrestricted	Unrestricted	Unrestricted	
1958–1960	Unspecified	2.5 L	0.75 L	Unrestricted	Unrestricted	Unrestricted	Prohibited	Avgas (Note: 108 (lean for landing) to 135 (rich for takeoff) octane aviation fuel.)
1961–1965	Unspecified	1.5 L (1.3 L min.)	Prohibited	Unrestricted	Unrestricted	Unrestricted	Prohibited	Pump Gas (Note: "commercial type generally distributed by road service stations, unless waiver granted by A.C.N.(of the hosting country)")
1966–1971	Piston, Rotary, and Turbine (Note: Piston engine Equivalency Ratio: Rotary: 1.4 times the swept volume of rotors. Turbine: Maximum exhaust area of the 1st stage compressor = 288.75/((3.10 × T) − 7.63) square cm T = 4.25 times per compressor for Radial compressors, 1.15 times per stage for Axial compressors.)	3.0 L	1.5 L	Unrestricted	Unrestricted	Unrestricted	Prohibited	Commercial (Note: Gasoline for Piston and Rotary: Commercially available petrol at stations across the country by an oil company designated by FIA for each nation. This regulation was mostly not enforced due to the differences among the hosting countries on national coverage and octane rating. Kerosene for Turbine: Commercially available kerosene for airlines.)
1972–1980	Piston, Rotary, and Turbine	3.0 L	1.5 L	Up to 12 cylinders	Unrestricted	Unrestricted	Prohibited	Commercial
1981–1985	4-stroke Piston	3.0 L	1.5 L	Up to 12 cylinders	Unrestricted	Unrestricted	Prohibited	Commercial
1986	4-stroke Piston	1.5 L	1.5 L	Up to 12 cylinders	Unrestricted	Unrestricted	Prohibited	Commercial
1987	4-stroke Piston	3.5 L	1.5 L, 4 bar	Up to 12 cylinders	Unrestricted	Unrestricted	Prohibited	Commercial
1988	4-stroke Piston	3.5 L	1.5 L, 2.5 bar	Up to 12 cylinders	Unrestricted	Unrestricted	Prohibited	Commercial
1989–1991	4-stroke Piston	3.5 L	Prohibited	Up to 12 cylinders	Unrestricted	Unrestricted	Prohibited	Commercial
1992–1994	4-stroke Piston	3.5 L	Prohibited	Up to 12 cylinders	Unrestricted	Unrestricted	Prohibited	Unleaded
1995–1999	4-stroke Piston	3.0 L	Prohibited	Up to 12 cylinders	Unrestricted	Unrestricted	Prohibited	Unleaded
2000–2005	4-stroke Piston	3.0 L	Prohibited	V10	Unrestricted	Unrestricted	Prohibited	Unleaded
2006 (Note: For 2006 and 2007, the FIA reserved the right to give special dispensations to teams without access to new specification engines to use 2005-spec engines with a rev-limiter. This dispensation was given to Scuderia Toro Rosso only in 2006.)	4-stroke Piston	2.4 L	Prohibited	90° V8	Unrestricted	Unrestricted	Prohibited	Unleaded
2007	4-stroke Piston	2.4 L	Prohibited	90° V8	19,000 rpm	Unrestricted	Prohibited	Unleaded
2008	4-stroke Piston	2.4 L	Prohibited	90° V8	19,000 rpm	Unrestricted	5.75% (Note: 5.75% bio-sourced alcohol content is required.)	Unleaded
2009–2013 (Note: Kinetic (braking) energy recovery system (KERS) allowed.)	4-stroke Piston	2.4 L	Prohibited	90° V8 + KERS	18,000 rpm	Unrestricted	5.75%	Unleaded
2014–2021 (Note: MGU (Motor Generator Unit)-Kinetic (engine-brake) and MGU-Heat (exhaust) energy recovery systems allowed.)	4-stroke Piston	1.6 L (no minimum) (Note: Naturally aspirated engines are not prohibited, but were not used by any team. Boost pressure is not limited, but fuel flow rate (which was not regulated up to 2013) is limited to 100 kg per hour (roughly equivalent to 3.5 bar at the maximum rpm).)		90° V6 + MGU-K + MGU-H	15,000 rpm (Note: Lower rpm fuel flow restriction on the next column reaches the maximum of 100 kg/hour at 10,500rpm. At this flow rate, further increasing rpm requires lower boost, or results in a thinner air/fuel ratio. Due to this, engine manufacturers normally set the maximum engine speed at around 12,000–13,000 rpm.)	(0.009 × rpm) + 5.5 up to 100 kg/h (Note: Maximum fuel flow rate (Q) is limited in relation to engine speed below 10,500rpm. On or above 10,500rpm, the maximum fuel flow rate of 100 kg/hour applies.)	5.75%	Unleaded
2022–2025	4-stroke Piston	1.6 L (1,590 cc minimum) (Note: Naturally aspirated engines are not prohibited. Boost pressure is not limited.)		90° V6 + MGU-K + MGU-H	Unrestricted	(0.009 × rpm) + 5.5 up to 100 kg/h	≥10% (Note: At least 10% ethanol content is required.)	Unleaded
2026–present	4-stroke Piston	1.6 L (1,590 cc minimum)		90° V6 + MGU-K	Unrestricted	(0.27 × rpm) + 165 up to 3,000 MJ/h (Note: Maximum fuel flow rate (Q) is limited in relation to engine speed below 10,500 rpm. On or above 10,500 rpm, the maximum fuel flow rate of 3000 MJ/h applies.)	100% synthetic hydrocarbon fuel	

=== 2014-2025 engine technical specifications ===
==== Combustion, construction, operation, power and fuel ====
- Manufacturers: Mercedes-Benz, Renault (including TAG Heuer rebadging until 2018), Ferrari and Red Bull Powertrains (Honda)
- Type: Hybrid-powered 4-stroke piston. '4-stroke' may imply Otto-cycle, but it is not required. Atkinson/Miller cycle allowed.
- Configuration: V6 hybrid turbocharged engine
- V-angle: 90° cylinder angle
- Displacement: 1.6 litres (98 cubic inches)
- Bore: 80 mm (3.150 in)
- Stroke: 53 mm (2.087 in)
- Compression ratio: Max. 18:1
- Valvetrain: DOHC, 24-valve (four valves per cylinder)
- Fuel: Minimum 87 (RON+MON)/2 unleaded petroleum + at least 10% "advanced sustainable" Ethanol. There are finer composition and property limitations, but improvements within the limits are allowed, provided a sample is submitted and approved by FIA. Honda, for example, requested and ExxonMobil agreed to provide special formulations with carbon-neutral components suited for lean/rapid-burn techniques.
- Fuel delivery: Petrol direct injection, port injection allowed.
- Maximum fuel injection pressure: 500 bar (7,252 psi)
- Number of fuel injectors: Max. 1 per cylinder. This is a severe limitation on stratified charge and sub-chamber ignition used for lean and rapid burn, as separate injectors cannot be used for sub- and main chambers to provide rich and lean gas. The number of injections per cycle is not limited.
- Fuel flow rate limit: (0.009 × rpm) + 5.5 up to 100 kg/h, with further limits under partial-throttle conditions.
- Fuel use limit: 110 kg / race
- Aspiration: Single-turbocharger with in-line electric motor/generator (MGU-H)
- Power output: About 850 + 161 hp (634 + 120 kW) @ 10,500 rpm and higher
- Torque: Approx. 600–815 N⋅m (443–601 lb⋅ft)
- Lubrication: Dry sump. Oil may not contain fuel octane boosting additives. Oil consumption is limited to Max. 0.30L / 100 km. Fluid level in oil tank is monitored by telemetry.
- Maximum revs: Unlimited (in practice, no engine goes much above 12,000 rpm as efficiency declines)
- Engine management: FIA Standard ECU. ECU (Electronic Control Unit) controls energy recovery and other chassis control / telemetry functions as well. Power unit control part of the ECU evolved from McLaren TAG-320B of 2019. Most parts of the program to operate the ECU were free to be improved as long as their copies (versions) submitted, registered, and approved by FIA (there were limitations on the number of versions in a season), but Power Unit control part of the program is frozen mostly from 2022 to 2025 seasons.
- Max. speed: Approximately 370 km/h (230 mph) (Monza, Baku and Mexico); 340 km/h (211 mph) normal tracks
- Mass: Minimum 150 kg (330.69 lb) complete
- Cooling: Single water pump
- Ignition: No more than 5 sparks per cycle
- Exhaust systems: Single exhaust with central exit

===== Forced induction =====
- Turbocharger mass: 8 kg (17.6 lb) depending on the turbine housing used
- Turbocharger rev limit: 125,000 rpm
- Pressure charging: Single-stage compressor and exhaust turbine, common-shaft with MGU-H
- Turbo boost pressure: Unlimited but typically 400–500 kPa (4.0–5.0 bar) absolute
- Wastegate: Maximum of two pop-off and two wastegate valves, electronic- or pneumatic-controlled. (Pop-off valves limit the intake pressure by recirculating the charge. Wastegate valves release excess pressure to the atmosphere.)

===== ERS systems =====
- MGU-K RPM: Max. 50,000 rpm, fixed driven/drive ratio by/to the crankshaft
- MGU-K power: Max. 120 kW (160 bhp)
- Energy recovered by MGU-K: Max. 2 MJ (0.56 kWh) / lap
- Energy received by MGU-K: Max. 4 MJ (1.1 kWh) / lap from Energy Store. A combination of high-voltage lithium-ion battery with a series of Super Capacitors acting as the buffer for high charge/discharge current. Max. voltage: 1000 V, weight limit: Minimum 20 kg. Maximum 25 kg. Unlimited from MGU-H. (Note: Due to these rules, the turbocharger is often used not to increase intake pressure (i.e., with pop-off valve open), but to drive MGU-H which provides electricity so that MGU-K output is pegged at 120kW for maximum acceleration regardless of the engine speed.)
- MGU-H RPM: Same as the turbocharger speed. Max. 125,000 rpm
- Energy recovered by MGU-H: Unlimited
- Energy released by MGU-H to drive the turbocharger or MGU-K: Unlimited.

== Records ==
Figures correct as of the 2026 São Paulo Grand Prix

Bold indicates engine manufacturers that have competed in Formula One in the 2026 season.

=== Most World Championship Grand Prix wins by engine manufacturer ===
Rank	Engine	Wins	First Win	Latest Win
1	**Mercedes** (built by Ilmor between 1994 and 2005)	253	1954 French Grand Prix	2026 São Paulo Grand Prix
2	**Ferrari**	251	1951 British Grand Prix	2026 British Grand Prix
3	Ford (built by Cosworth)	176	1967 Dutch Grand Prix	2003 Brazilian Grand Prix
4	Renault	169	1979 French Grand Prix	2021 Hungarian Grand Prix
5	**Honda**	89	1965 Mexican Grand Prix	2021 Abu Dhabi Grand Prix
6	Coventry Climax	40	1958 Argentine Grand Prix	1965 German Grand Prix
7	Honda RBPT	38	2023 Bahrain Grand Prix	2025 Abu Dhabi Grand Prix
8	TAG (built by Porsche)	25	1984 Brazilian Grand Prix	1987 Portuguese Grand Prix
9	BMW	20	1982 Canadian Grand Prix	2008 Canadian Grand Prix
10	BRM	18	1959 Dutch Grand Prix	1972 Monaco Grand Prix

=== Most consecutive wins ===
Rank	Manufacturer	Wins	Season(s)	Races	Engine(s)	Winning Constructor(s)
1	Ford	22	1972, 1973, 1974	1972 Austrian Grand Prix – 1974 South African Grand Prix	DFV	(United Kingdom) Lotus, (United Kingdom) Tyrrell, (United Kingdom) McLaren, (United Kingdom) Brabham
2	Ford	20	1968, 1969, 1970	1968 British Grand Prix – 1970 Monaco Grand Prix	DFV	(United Kingdom) Lotus, (France) Matra, (United Kingdom) McLaren, (United Kingdom) Brabham, (United Kingdom) March
3	Renault	16	1995, 1996	1995 French Grand Prix – 1996 San Marino Grand Prix	RS7, RS8	(United Kingdom) Benetton, (United Kingdom) Williams
4	Honda RBPT	14	2023	2023 Bahrain Grand Prix – 2023 Italian Grand Prix	RBPTH001	(Austria) Red Bull
5	**Honda**	11	1988	1988 Brazilian Grand Prix – 1988 Belgian Grand Prix	RA168E	(United Kingdom) McLaren
6	**Ferrari**	10	2002	2002 Canadian Grand Prix – 2002 Japanese Grand Prix	Tipo 051	(Italy) Ferrari
6	**Mercedes**	10	2015, 2016	2015 Japanese Grand Prix – 2016 Russian Grand Prix	PU106B Hybrid, PU106C Hybrid	(Germany) Mercedes
6	**Mercedes**	10	2016	2016 Monaco Grand Prix – 2016 Singapore Grand Prix	PU106C Hybrid	(Germany) Mercedes
6	**Mercedes**	10	2018, 2019	2018 Brazilian Grand Prix – 2019 French Grand Prix	M09 EQ Power+, M10 EQ Power+	(Germany) Mercedes
10	Ford	9	1980, 1981	1980 Dutch Grand Prix – 1981 Belgian Grand Prix	DFV	(United Kingdom) Brabham, (United Kingdom) Williams
10	Renault	9	2013	2013 Belgian Grand Prix – 2013 Brazilian Grand Prix	RS27-2013	(Austria) Red Bull
10	Red Bull Powertrains	9	2022	2022 French Grand Prix – 2022 Mexico City Grand Prix	RBPTH001	(Austria) Red Bull
10	Honda RBPT	9	2023, 2024	2023 Japanese Grand Prix – 2024 Saudi Arabian Grand Prix	RBPTH001, RBPTH002	(Austria) Red Bull

== See also ==
- List of Formula One engine manufacturers
