= Antilag system =

Method of reducing turbo lag on performance cars

In internal combustion engines with turbochargers, an anti-lag system (ALS) is a method of reducing turbo lag in racing or performance applications. It works by retarding ignition timing and adding extra fuel (and sometimes air) to balance an inherent loss in combustion efficiency with increased pressure at the turbine. The excess fuel/air mixture escapes through the exhaust valves and combusts in the hot exhaust manifold, spooling the turbocharger and creating higher usable pressure.

== Overview ==
ALSes were first used in the early days of turbocharging in Formula One in the 1980s until fuel restrictions made their use unsuitable. The technology later became common in rally cars because of increased turbo lag from the mandated restrictor plate at the intake. The restrictor results in a significant intake pressure drop; the pressure ratio for a given boost level is much higher, and the turbocharger must spin much faster to produce the same boost as it would unrestricted, significantly increasing turbo lag.

An ALS requires an air bypass, generally done in one of two ways. The first method is to use a throttle air bypass that circumvents the throttle and feeds air to the engine; this may be an external bypass valve or a solenoid that slightly opens the throttle 12–20 degrees. The second method is to use a bypass that feeds charge air (pressurized intake air between the turbo compressor and intake valves) directly to the exhaust manifold.

== Types ==
=== Throttle bypass ===
The throttle bypass or "throttle kick" system is combined with ignition timing retardation and slight fuel enrichment (mainly to provide cooling). Typically, ignition occurs at 35–45° ATDC (after top dead center). This late ignition causes very little expansion of the gas in the cylinder, so that the pressure and temperature are kept high when the exhaust valve opens. At the same time, the amount of torque delivered to the crankshaft is very small (just enough to keep the engine running). The higher exhaust pressure and temperature, combined with increased mass flow, are enough to keep the turbocharger spinning at high speed. When the throttle is opened up, ignition and fuel injection return to normal.

Since many engine components are exposed to extreme temperatures and high-pressure pulses during ALS operation, this kind of system places a large amount of stress on the engine, turbocharger, and exhaust manifold. In addition to temperature issues, uncontrolled turbo speeds can quickly destroy the turbocharger. In most applications, the ALS is automatically deactivated to prevent overheating when the coolant reaches a temperature of 110–115 °C.

=== Intake bypass ===
An ALS working with an intake bypass valve feeds air directly to the exhaust manifold, where it is mixed with partially combusted gasses from the engine, thus igniting them again and spooling up the turbo. Such a system can be made more refined than the throttle bypass system described above.

One of the earliest systems of this type was used by the Ferrari F1 team in the 1980s. Another well-known application of this type of anti-lag system was in the World Rally Championship versions of the 1995 Mitsubishi Lancer Evolution III and Toyota Celica GT-Four (ST205). The system was controlled by two pressure valves, operated by the ECU. Besides the racing version, the plumbing of the anti-lag system was also installed in the street-legal Celica GT-Four WRC homologation model, though the system itself was disabled, the piping and valves only present for homologation purposes. On later Japanese-market Mitsubishi Lancer Evolution models (IV through IX), the SAS (Secondary Air System) can be modified to provide anti-lag. The Prodrive P2 prototype uses a more modern, refined intake bypass system.

=== Antilag-adjacent systems ===
==== Turbocharger bypass ====
Sometimes referred to as a Dan Culkin valve or D-valve, this is a method by which a large one-way check valve is inserted just before the throttle body, enabling air to bypass the turbo, intercooler, and charge piping during periods of negative air pressure at the throttle body inlet. This results in a steady supply of air, allowing more fuel to combust and drive the turbine. The valve closes as soon as positive pressure is reached in the intercooler housing. This is less of a true anti-lag system than it is a quick spool system, and thus can be incorporated into other ALS systems.

When used with a mass air flow sensor (MAF), the check valve should draw air through the MAF to maintain proper air-fuel ratios. This is not necessary in a speed-density configuration.

==== Ignition retard and fuel dump ====
Many programmable engine control units (ECUs) also offer an "anti-lag" feature designed to spool turbos during launches or between shifts. As with the aforementioned turbo bypass, this is less of a true anti-lag system than it is a quick spool system (and can also be combined with other systems), though this more closely approximates a true ALS.

When a car is ready for launch and at its launch RPM, some ECUs (via a switch or additional throttle) can be programmed to retard the ignition by quite a few degrees and add significantly more fuel. The combustion event occurs as the engine is driving the air/fuel mixture out of the cylinder, closer to the turbine, causing it to spool up either at a lower RPM or make much more boost at the launch RPM than it would normally.

Some software can also engage this "anti-lag" feature via clutch input with full-throttle shifting, effectively making it work between shifts. Like other types of anti-lag, overuse of this type of anti-lag can cause damage to the turbine wheel, exhaust manifold, and more due to high pressure from the air/fuel mixture spontaneously combusting almost (or completely) outside of the combustion chamber. It may also result in afterfires.

This form of "anti-lag" tends to work well because it is only active at wide open throttle, during which more air can enter the engine. Consequently, it does not perform as well (or activate at all) at partial or closed throttle, unless combined with a secondary air system or bypass as described above.

==== MGU-H ====
Modern Formula One engines take the form of a turbocharged V6 engine with an additional hybrid system. Until 2026, this hybrid system consisted of two motor–generator units (MGUs): the "Motor Generator Unit – Kinetic" (MGU-K), and the "Motor Generator Unit – Heat" (MGU-H), with the MGU-H having since been banned in the 2026 power unit regulations. To almost entirely eliminate turbo lag, electrical energy stored in the car's onboard battery was partially deployed to the MGU-H, which spun the compressor. This allowed the turbo system to reach peak boost pressure almost immediately, effectively negating any turbo lag.

During normal race conditions, electric motor input was gradually reduced as engine RPM increased and the exhaust gasses were able to sustain the desired boost pressures. During qualifying laps and sometimes strategically throughout the race, energy could be deployed to the MGU-H on demand, even when the engine was running at high RPM. This allowed for the exhaust gasses to bypass the turbo via the wastegate. This was said to increase power by 5–10%, although at a cost to stored energy levels.

The MGU-H could also be used to generate electrical energy by allowing the electric motor that usually spun the turbine to be spun by the turbo system itself, a process known as "harvesting". This scenario existed when exhaust gasses were being routed through the turbo and the turbo system was operating in a conventional manner. Although harvesting came at a cost to overall power, it allowed for a net gain for reduction in overall lap times, as it was done in sections of the track that did not require peak power levels (for example, at the end of straights or between certain corners), or where calculations had ascertained that the loss in torque in those sections of the track was made up for in sections where the generated power could be deployed.

Harvesting was also used much more liberally as a form of electric-hybrid turbo-compounding. Because the gas left the engine still hot and under pressure, enthalpy would otherwise be lost, mostly through the wastegate, when the maximum boost was reached. The energy recovered was used both as a way to bypass the 4 MJ limit on the amount of deployable energy, as that applied only on the battery, and as a way to improve the overall efficiency of the engine. Given that for most of the race the hardest limit was the fuel flow, that increase in efficiency translated directly into a higher total power output. As a result, the MGU-H was run at some level of harvesting setting for most of the race. According to Mercedes' Andy Cowell, the MGU-H supplied around 60% of the electrical energy used by the MGU-K and contributed about 5% of the engine's thermal efficiency. Mercedes reported exceeding 50% thermal efficiency on the dynamometer in 2017, up from 44% in 2014.

== Sources ==
- "Bang-bang, or Anti-Lag System". Rallycars.com.
- "A look at anti-lag systems for turbocharged vehicles". Brewed Motorsports. 12 June 2012.
