= Prodrive P2 =

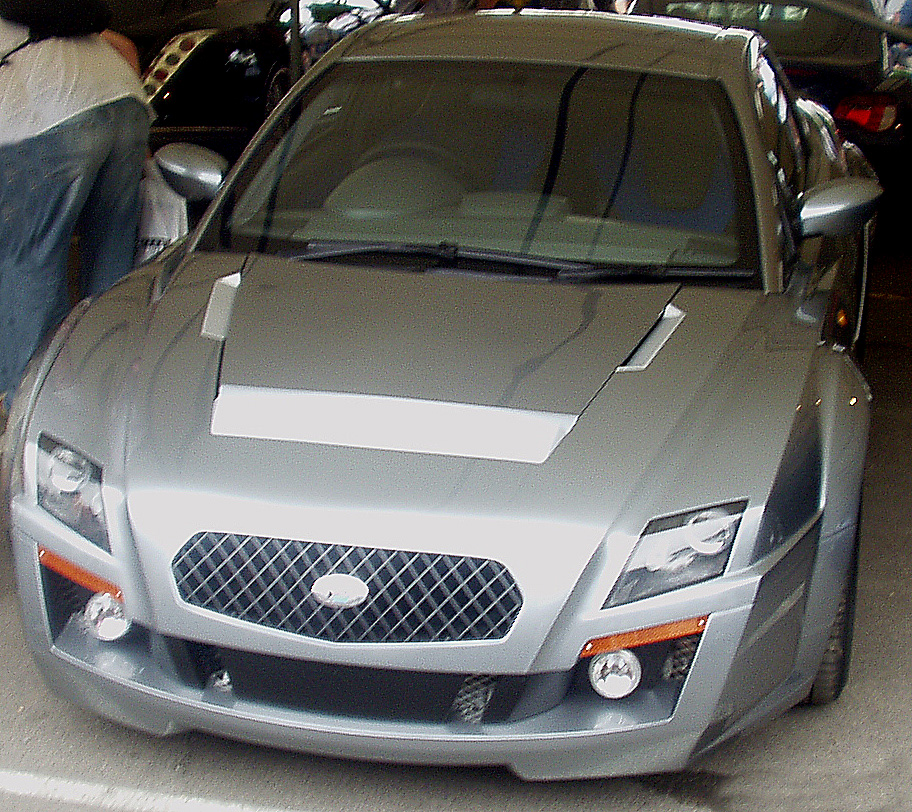

Overview
- Manufacturer: Prodrive; Subaru
- Production: 2006 (Concept)
- Designer: Peter Stevens

Body and chassis
- Class: Sports car
- Layout: Front engine four-wheel drive

Powertrain
- Engine: 2.0L 4-cylinder

Dimensions
- Kerb weight: 1,100 kg (2,425 lb)

The Prodrive P2 is a prototype two-seater sports car designed, engineered and built by Prodrive at its Banbury and Warwick sites. The car is based on the platform of the Subaru R1 kei car and has a modified Subaru Impreza WRX STi engine along with many Prodrive systems originally designed for their World Championship and Sports Car Racing programmes. The car's styling was done by Peter Stevens, who also designed the McLaren F1. The car includes rally-inspired anti-lag to prevent turbo lag, as well as an active center and rear differential that maximizes grip.

A fully working car was built, and was tested on the TV motoring programme Top Gear — it had 345 bhp (257 kW; 350 PS), obtained a 0-60 mph time of 3.8 seconds, a top speed of 174 miles per hour (280 km/h), and had a Power Lap of 1:24.3, beating such cars as the TVR Sagaris, Audi R8, BMW M5 and Aston Martin Vanquish. It also made Jeremy Clarkson appear to vomit after driving around a circle of cones extremely rapidly to demonstrate its computer-controlled differential system's anti-understeer capabilities.

The car's active rear differential automatically shifts torque to whichever of the rear wheels needs it most during manoeuvring, based on spin-slip sensor readings; this is a common rally-car technology rarely seen on road cars. Prodrive claimed that the car could have retailed for around £40,000, but also said there were no plans to put the car into production.
